= 2013 BWF World Junior Championships – Girls singles =

The Girls Singles tournament of the 2013 BWF World Junior Championships was held from October 29 until November 3. The winner of last edition was Nozomi Okuhara.

Akane Yamaguchi who lost in the final last year, made a redemption this year, after beating her compatriot Aya Ohori in the all-Japanese final 21-11, 21-13.

== Seeded ==
1. (Japan) Aya Ohori (final)
2. (Thailand) Busanan Ongbumrungpan (semi-final)
3. (Bulgaria) Stefani Stoeva (quarter-final)
4. (Japan) Akane Yamaguchi (champion)
5. (China) He Bingjiao (semi-final)
6. (South Korea) Kim Hyo-min (quarter-final)
7. (France) Delphine Lansac (second round)
8. (Indonesia) Hanna Ramadhini (quarter-final)
9. (China) Chen Yufei (fourth round)
10. (Thailand) Pornpawee Chochuwong (third round)
11. (South Korea) Kim Na-young (fourth round)
12. (South Korea) Lee Min-ji (fourth round)
13. (Singapore) Liang Xiaoyu (quarter-final)
14. (Croatia) Maja Pavlinic (third round)
15. (Slovakia) Martina Repiska (second round)
16. (India) Ruthvika Shivani Gadde (fourth round)

== Draw ==
=== Finals ===
Quarterfinals
1	(Japan) Aya Ohori	17	21	21
9/16	(Singapore) Liang Xiaoyu	21	16	14
3/4	(Bulgaria) Stefani Stoeva	21	13	21
5/8	(China) He Bingjiao	18	21	23
5/8	(South Korea) Kim Hyo-min	12	21	18
3/4	(Japan) Akane Yamaguchi	21	9	21
5/8	(Indonesia) Hanna Ramadini	10	8
2	(Thailand) Busanan Ongbumrungpan	21	21

Semifinals
1	(Japan) Aya Ohori	21	21
5/8	(China) He Bingjiao	16	17
3/4	(Japan) Akane Yamaguchi	21	21
2	(Thailand) Busanan Ongbumrungpan	11	19

Final
1	(Japan) Aya Ohori	11	13
3/4	(Japan) Akane Yamaguchi	21	21

=== Top Half ===
==== Section 1 ====
First round
(South Africa) D Botha	3	8
(Malaysia) K Selvaduray	21	21
(Denmark) J Finne-Ipsen	21	21
(Uzbekistan) V Mushtakova	11	11
(Macau) U TI	9	21	4
(Vietnam) Nguyen TL	21	17	21
(China) Qin JJ	21	21
(Australia) A Wu	17	8

Second round
1	(Japan) A Ohori	21	21
(Chinese Taipei) Sung S-y	10	9
(Malaysia) K Selvaduray	21	21
(Denmark) J Finne-Ipsen	8	9
9/16	(South Korea) Lee M-j	21	17	21
(Japan) C Hoshi	17	21	18
(Vietnam) Nguyen TL	16	13
(China) Qin JJ	21	21

Third round
1	(Japan) A Ohori	22	21
(Malaysia) K Selvaduray	20	17
9/16	(South Korea) Lee M-j	10	22	21
(China) Qin JJ	21	20	14

Fourth round
1	(Japan) A Ohori	21	21
9/16	(South Korea) Lee M-j	10	12

==== Section 2 ====
First round
(India) R Das	21	21
(Russia) E Kut	4	6
(Japan) A Sakuramoto	21	21
(Canada) K O'Donoghue	7	16
(Botswana) T Kabelo	8	9
(Czech Republic) M Lajdova	21	21
(Malaysia) Lee YY	21	21
(Uzbekistan) A Khurshudyan	3	3

Second round
5/8	(France) D Lansac	14	21	14
(Hong Kong) Ng WY	21	13	21
(India) R Das	21	21
(Japan) A Sakuramoto	5	11
9/16	(Singapore) Liang XY	21	21
(Bulgaria) M Ivanova	12	8
(Czech Republic) M Lajdova	3	12
(Malaysia) Lee YY	21	21

Third round
(Hong Kong) Ng WY	13	20
(India) R Das	21	22
9/16	(Singapore) Liang XY	21	21
(Malaysia) Lee YY	18	14

Fourth round
(India) R Das	13	8
9/16	(Singapore) Liang XY	21	21

==== Section 3 ====
First round
(Sri Lanka) M Fonseka	11	10
(Russia) K Averkina	21	21
(South Africa) J Van der Vyver	7	15
(Netherlands) A Chen	21	21
(Chinese Taipei) Cheng Y-c	17	21	21
(India) R Karthik	21	14	12
(Finland) A Paavola	8	15
(Indonesia) I Jayanti	21	21

Second round
3/4	(Bulgaria) S Stoeva	21	21
(United States) C Chow	15	10
(Russia) K Averkina	18	18
(Netherlands) A Chen	21	21
9/16	(Croatia) M Pavlinic	21	21
(Philippines) A Albo	8	12
(Chinese Taipei) Cheng Y-c	21	17	16
(Indonesia) I Jayanti	17	21	21

Third round
3/4	(Bulgaria) S Stoeva	21	21
(Netherlands) A Chen	9	15
9/16	(Croatia) M Pavlinic	21	17	14
(Indonesia) I Jayanti	18	21	21

Fourth round
3/4	(Bulgaria) S Stoeva	20	21	21
(Indonesia) I Jayanti	22	11	13

==== Section 4 ====
First round
(Armenia) L Poghosyan	8	7
(Indonesia) R Hartawan	21	21
(Spain) I Fernandez
(Singapore) N Tan	wo
(China) Wang XY	21	21
(Scotland) J MacPherson	4	15
(Uzbekistan) M Pakina	21	5	13
(Turkey) K Karatas	19	21	21

Second round
5/8	(China) He BJ	21	21
(Germany) L Heim	8	8
(Indonesia) R Hartawan	21	21
(Spain) I Fernandez	9	15
9/16	(Thailand) P Chochuwong	21	21
(Mexico) H Gaitan	13	11
(China) Wang XY	21	21
(Turkey) K Karatas	12	15

Third round
5/8	(China) He BJ	21	21
(Indonesia) R Hartawan	14	9
9/16	(Thailand) P Chochuwong	18	21	20
(China) Wang XY	21	16	22

Fourth round
5/8	(China) He BJ	12	21	21
(China) Wang XY	21	15	19

=== Bottom Half ===
==== Section 5 ====
First round
(Germany) Y Li	21	21
(Scotland) H MacPherson	9	12
(United States) C Yang	14	15
(South Korea) Jun J-i	21	21
(Croatia) D Sutara	10	21	13
(Indonesia) Fitriani	21	19	21
(Singapore) Yeo JM	21	21
(Spain) C Azurmendi	14	17
(Turkey) O Ozer	9	11
(Chinese Taipei) Yu C-h	21	21

Second round
(Germany) Y Li	16	13
(South Korea) Jun J-i	21	21
(Indonesia) Fitriani	14	21	18
9/16	(China) Chen YF	21	15	21
(Singapore) Yeo JM	21	13	14
(Chinese Taipei) Yu C-h	15	21	21
(Czech Republic) M Svetnickova	14	4
5/8	(South Korea) Kim H-m	21	21

Third round
(South Korea) Jun J-i	13	11
9/16	(China) Chen YF	21	21
(Chinese Taipei) Yu C-h	17	16
5/8	(South Korea) Kim H-m	21	21

Fourth round
9/16	(China) Chen YF	21	19	13
5/8	(South Korea) Kim H-m	14	21	21

==== Section 6 ====
First round
(Mexico) S Solis	21	21
(Armenia) L Minasyan	16	16
(Bulgaria) M Mitsova	21	21
(Botswana) G Mhlauli	9	1
(Thailand) S Katethong	21	21
(Finland) L Vainula	11	9
(Thailand) T Poopradubsil	21	20	21
(Hong Kong) Ng TY	15	22	15

Second round
(Mexico) S Solis	21	13	19
(Bulgaria) M Mitsova	12	21	21
(Germany) T Wurm	15	12
9/16	(India) R Gadde	21	21
(Thailand) S Katethong	21	15	19
(Thailand) T Poopradubsil	16	21	21
(Vietnam) Dinh TPH	19	16
3/4	(Japan) A Yamaguchi	21	21

Third round
(Bulgaria) M Mitsova	16	21	13
9/16	(India) R Gadde	21	18	21
(Thailand) T Poopradubsil	15	12
3/4	(Japan) A Yamaguchi	21	21

Fourth round
9/16	(India) R Gadde	10	15
3/4	(Japan) A Yamaguchi	21	21

==== Section 7 ====
First round
(Finland) V Lindberg	20	14
(Australia) J Lai	22	21
(Philippines) S Barredo	16	16
(Malaysia) Goh JW	21	21
(Sri Lanka) T Hendahewa	21	21
(Australia) V Ma	10	10
(Canada) R Honderich	21	21
(Czech Republic) D Sikalova	4	8

Second round
(Australia) J Lai	8	9
(Malaysia) Goh JW	21	21
(Canada) B Tam	9	13
9/16	(South Korea) Kim N-y	21	21
(Sri Lanka) T Hendahewa	21	13	22
(Canada) R Honderich	16	21	20
(South Africa) A Schoonees	4	6
5/8	(Indonesia) H Ramadini	21	21

Third round
(Malaysia) Goh JW	21	19	2^{r}
9/16	(South Korea) Kim N-y	17	21	5
(Sri Lanka) T Hendahewa	8	12
5/8	(Indonesia) H Ramadini	21	21

Fourth round
9/16	(South Korea) Kim N-y	21	18	12
5/8	(Indonesia) H Ramadini	17	21	21

==== Section 8 ====
First round
(Macau) Wong KI	14	12
(Russia) V Dergunova	21	21
(France) A Tran	10	11
(Denmark) M Blichfeldt	21	21
(Hong Kong) Tsang WC	21	21
(Spain) S Penalver	11	8
(Hong Kong) Wu YT	15	18
(Malaysia) Ho YM	21	21

Second round
(Russia) V Dergunova	17	18
(Denmark) M Blichfeldt	21	21
(France) M Batomene	17	21	21
9/16	(Slovakia) M Repiska	21	7	6
(Hong Kong) Tsang WC	13	19
(Malaysia) Ho YM	21	21
(United States) A Tang	2	10
2	(Thailand) B Ongbumrungpan	21	21

Third round
(Denmark) M Blichfeldt	21	21
(France) M Batomene	15	14
(Malaysia) Ho YM	6	14
2	(Thailand) B Ongbumrungpan	21	21

Fourth round
(Denmark) M Blichfeldt	14	5
2	(Thailand) B Ongbumrungpan	21	21
