= 2014 BWF World Junior Championships – Girls singles =

The Girls Singles tournament of the 2014 BWF World Junior Championships was held on April 13–18. The defending champion of the last edition is Akane Yamaguchi from Japan.

This year, Yamaguchi managed to defend her title after beating Chinese He Bingjiao 14-21, 21-18, 21-13 in the final. This also make the title won by Japanese 3 times in a row.

== Seeded ==
1. (Japan) Akane Yamaguchi (champion)
2. (Thailand) Busanan Ongbumrungpan (quarter-final)
3. (Thailand) Pornpawee Chochuwong (quarter-final)
4. (Japan) Aya Ohori (semi-final)
5. (Denmark) Mia Blichfeldt (fourth round)
6. (India) Ruthvika Shivani Gadde (third round)
7. (China) He Bingjiao (final)
8. (Singapore) Liang Xiaoyu (quarter-final)
9. (China) Chen Yufei (third round)
10. (Netherlands) Alida Chen (second round)
11. (Indonesia) Ruselli Hartawan (fourth round)
12. (Germany) Luise Heim (second round)
13. (Vietnam) Nguyen Thuy Linh (fourth round)
14. (Croatia) Maja Pavlinic (fourth round)
15. (Thailand) Thamolwan Poopradubsil (second round)
16. (China) Qin Jinjing (semi-final)

== Draw ==
=== Finals ===
Quarterfinals
1	(Japan) Akane Yamaguchi	21	16	21
5/8	(Singapore) Liang Xiaoyu	11	21	17
3/4	(Thailand) Pornpawee Chochuwong	15	21	18
9/16	(China) Qin Jinjing	21	10	21
(Japan) Natsuki Nidaira	22	18	10
3/4	(Japan) Aya Ohori	20	21	21
5/8	(China) He Bingjiao	21	21
2	(Thailand) Busanan Ongbumrungpan	11	14

Semifinals
1	(Japan) Akane Yamaguchi	19	21	21
9/16	(China) Qin Jinjing	21	13	14
3/4	(Japan) Aya Ohori	13	19
5/8	(China) He Bingjiao	21	21

Final
1	(Japan) Akane Yamaguchi	14	21	21
5/8	(China) He Bingjiao	21	18	13

=== Top Half ===
==== Section 1 ====
First round
(Egypt) N Mohamed	2	1
(China) Chen XX	21	21
(Spain) C Azurmendi	21	21
(Russia) A Davletova	10	12
(Zambia) M Chilambe	5	6
(Sri Lanka) I Warangana	21	21
(Canada) B Tam	21	21
(India) R Karthik	12	16

Second round
1	(Japan) A Yamaguchi	21	21
(Slovenia) K Beton	8	6
(China) Chen XX	21	21
(Spain) C Azurmendi	12	17
9/16	(Indonesia) R Hartawan	21	21
(Bulgaria) M Mitsova	9	12
(Sri Lanka) I Warangana	11	16
(Canada) B Tam	21	21

Third round
1	(Japan) A Yamaguchi	21	21
(China) Chen XX	19	19
9/16	(Indonesia) R Hartawan	19	21	21
(Canada) B Tam	21	15	18

Fourth round
1	(Japan) A Yamaguchi	21	19	21
9/16	(Indonesia) R Hartawan	12	21	14

==== Section 2 ====
First round
(France) L Courtois	21	17	20
(Australia) J Lai	17	21	22
(South Korea) Kim G-e	21	21
(United States) A Xu	16	9
(Indonesia) A Winata	21	21
(Uzbekistan) M Pakina	9	6
(Czech Republic) M Lajdova	21	21
(Philippines) M Sevilla	17	12
(Canada) J Chen	16	12
(South Korea) Park S-y	21	21

Second round
5/8	(Singapore) Liang XY	21	21
(Sri Lanka) K Waduthantri	4	6
(Australia) J Lai	11	16
(South Korea) Kim G-e	21	21
9/16	(Germany) L Heim	14	8
(Indonesia) A Winata	21	21
(Czech Republic) M Lajdova	12	17
(South Korea) Park S-y	21	21

Third round
5/8	(Singapore) Liang XY	18	21	23
(South Korea) Kim G-e	21	16	21
(Indonesia) A Winata	21	21
(South Korea) Park S-y	18	12

Fourth round
5/8	(Singapore) Liang XY	21	21
(Indonesia) A Winata	8	13

==== Section 3 ====
First round
(United States) K Xu	21	21
(South Africa) J Scholtz	7	7
(Botswana) T Banewang	6	6
(Slovenia) E Cizelj	21	21
(Iran) S Aghaei	16	14
(Hong Kong) Ng TY	21	21
(Russia) E Pyatina	21	21
(Mongolia) N Bayarsaikhan	5	8
(Macau) Kuan CL	13	11
(England) J Hopton	21	21

Second round
3/4	(Thailand) P Chochuwong	21	21
(Syria) M Al Jalad	4	4
(United States) K Xu	21	21
(Slovenia) E Cizelj	9	16
9/16	(Vietnam) Nguyen TL	21	21
(Hong Kong) Ng TY	16	9
(Russia) E Pyatina	21	21
(England) J Hopton	15	14

Third round
3/4	(Thailand) P Chochuwong	21	21
(United States) K Xu	13	15
9/16	(Vietnam) Nguyen TL	20	21	21
(Russia) E Pyatina	22	5	19

Fourth round
3/4	(Thailand) P Chochuwong	21	18	21
9/16	(Vietnam) Nguyen TL	17	21	10

==== Section 4 ====
First round
(South Africa) J van der Vyver	10	13
(Croatia) D Sutara	21	21
(Netherlands) I van der Aar	21	14	17
(Mexico) S Solis	16	21	21
(Malaysia) Ho YM	21	14	21
(Chinese Taipei) Lee C-h	17	21	11
(Thailand) A Sapniti	3	21	13
(Japan) R Kawashima	21	19	21
(Australia) J Tam	14	10
(Denmark) J Jakobsen	21	21

Second round
5/8	(Denmark) M Blichfeldt	21	21
(Armenia) K Margaryan	4	10
(Croatia) D Sutara	22	9	18
(Mexico) S Solis	20	21	21
9/16	(China) Qin JJ	21	21
(Malaysia) Ho YM	19	17
(Japan) R Kawashima
(Denmark) J Jakobsen	wo

Third round
5/8	(Denmark) M Blichfeldt	21	21
(Mexico) S Solis	9	18
9/16	(China) Qin JJ	21	21
(Japan) R Kawashima	16	14

Fourth round
5/8	(Denmark) M Blichfeldt	11	8
9/16	(China) Qin JJ	21	21

=== Bottom Half ===
==== Section 5 ====
First round
(France) Y Hoyaux	21	21
(Egypt) H Doha	7	6
(Canada) T Wang	21	21
(Slovenia) L Salehar	19	9
(Zambia) E Siamupangila	11	2
(Philippines) A Geverjuan	21	21
(Denmark) S Dahl	10^{r}
(Japan) N Nidaira	9
(Sri Lanka) T Hendahewa	8	21	21
(Australia) A Wu	21	9	16

Second round
(France) Y Hoyaux	21	21
(Canada) T Wang	19	15
(Philippines) A Geverjuan	7	9
9/16	(Croatia) M Pavlinic	21	21
(Japan) N Nidaira	21	21
(Sri Lanka) T Hendahewa	19	16
(Macau) Wong KI	9	6
5/8	(India) R Gadde	21	21

Third round
(France) Y Hoyaux	21	18	16
9/16	(Croatia) M Pavlinic	13	21	21
(Japan) N Nidaira	22	21
5/8	(India) R Gadde	20	19

Fourth round
9/16	(Croatia) M Pavlinic	15	7
(Japan) N Nidaira	21	21

==== Section 6 ====
First round
(Chinese Taipei) Chen S-y	20	15
(Germany) Y Li	22	21
(South Korea) Jang N-r	21	21
(Uzbekistan) A Khurshudyan	9	11
(Malaysia) Goh JW	21	21
(Mexico) H Gaitan	9	11
(Armenia) L Poghosyan	11	18
(Hong Kong) Chow KL	21	21
(Vietnam) Do TPM	21	21
(Germany) J Petrikowski	14	17

Second round
(Germany) Y Li	21	11	21
(South Korea) Jang N-r	16	21	15
(Malaysia) Goh JW	21	17	21
9/16	(Thailand) T Poopradubsil	14	21	14
(Hong Kong) Chow KL	21	21
(Vietnam) Do TPM	9	18
(Spain) S Penalver	3	7
3/4	(Japan) A Ohori	21	21

Third round
(Germany) Y Li	10	7
(Malaysia) Goh JW	21	21
(Hong Kong) Chow KL	8	6
3/4	(Japan) A Ohori	21	21

Fourth round
(Malaysia) Goh JW	13	11
3/4	(Japan) A Ohori	21	21

==== Section 7 ====
First round
(Indonesia) Fitriani	21	21
(United States) C Pan	12	18
(Singapore) Yeo JM	21	21
(Spain) I Fernandez	11	10
(Turkey) A Demirbag	12	12
(Chinese Taipei) Sung S-y	21	21
(England) I Banerjee	20	14^{r}
(Hong Kong) Fan KY	22	17
(England) L Powell	20	21	21
(Singapore) Tan AN	22	14	18

Second round
(Indonesia) Fitriani	22	21
(Singapore) Yeo JM	20	10
(Chinese Taipei) Sung S-y	21	13	7
9/16	(China) Chen YF	19	21	21
(Hong Kong) Fan KY	21	17	21
(England) L Powell	15	21	16
(France) D Delrue	4	4
5/8	(China) He BJ	21	21

Third round
(Indonesia) Fitriani	21	15	21
9/16	(China) Chen YF	18	21	11
(Hong Kong) Fan KY	13	6
5/8	(China) He BJ	21	21

Fourth round
(Indonesia) Fitriani	12	21	14
5/8	(China) He BJ	21	19	21

==== Section 8 ====
First round
(South Africa) A Schoonees	4	6
(Malaysia) Lee YY	21	21
(Czech Republic) M Svetnickova	16	12
(Philippines) A Albo	21	21
(Botswana) T Kabelo	4	15
(Malaysia) Tew JJ	21	21
(Russia) M Dmitrieva	19	21	21
(Bulgaria) M Delcheva	21	8	12

Second round
(Malaysia) Lee YY	21	21
(Philippines) A Albo	14	6
(South Korea) Yoon M-a	21	21
9/16	(Netherlands) A Chen	11	11
(Malaysia) Tew JJ	21	16	15
(Russia) M Dmitrieva	19	21	21
(Indonesia) G Mariska	12	14
2	(Thailand) B Ongbumrungpan	21	21

Third round
(Malaysia) Lee YY	21	21
(South Korea) Yoon M-a	11	12
(Russia) M Dmitrieva	8	5
2	(Thailand) B Ongbumrungpan	21	21

Fourth round
(Malaysia) Lee YY	8	18
2	(Thailand) B Ongbumrungpan	21	21
