= Ruselli Hartawan =

Indonesian badminton player (born 1997)

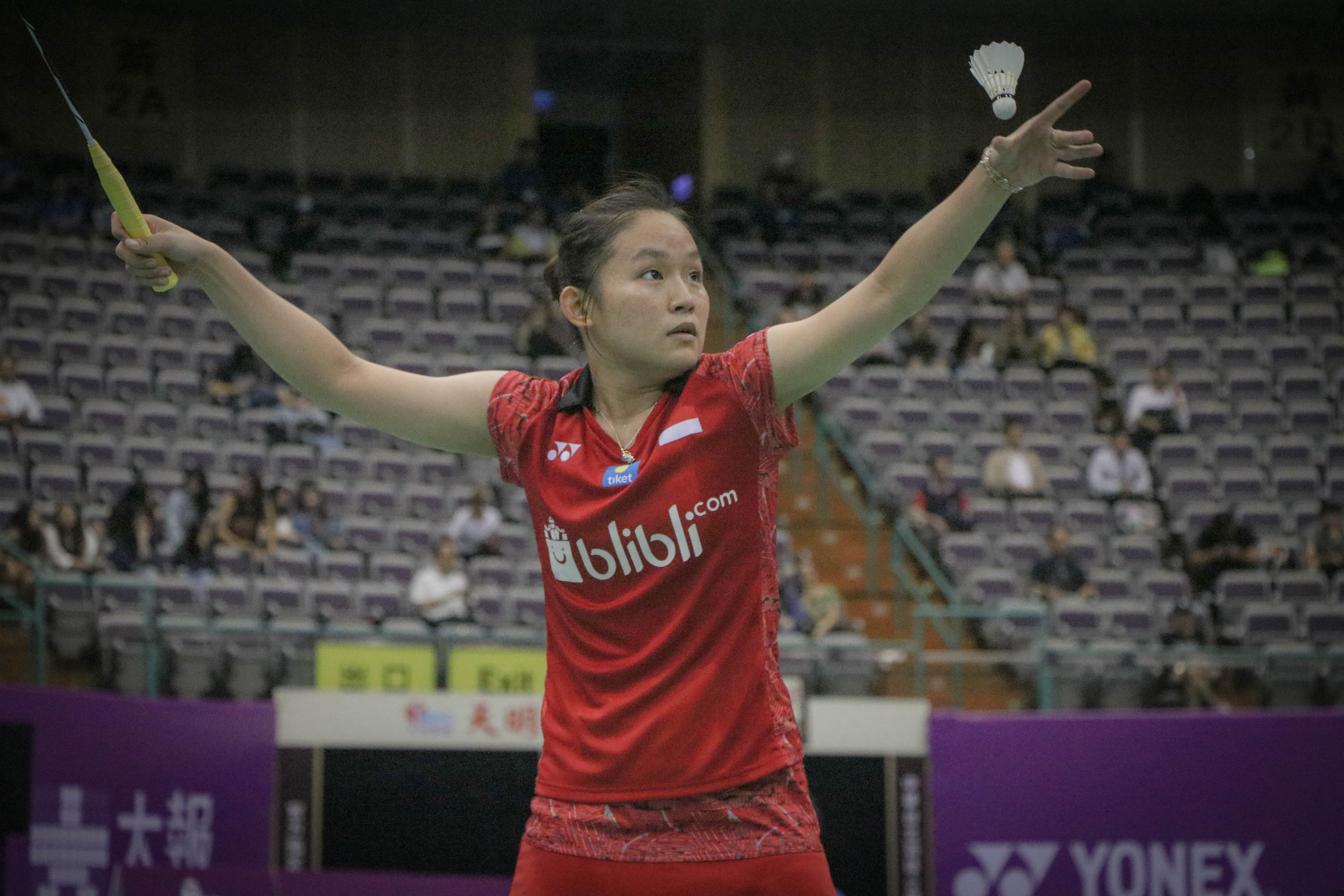

Personal information
- Born: 27 December 1997 (age 28) Jakarta, Indonesia
- Height: 1.60 m (5 ft 3 in)
- Weight: 57.5 kg (127 lb)

Sport
- Country: Indonesia
- Sport: Badminton
- Handedness: Right

Women's singles
- Highest ranking: 34 (19 November 2019)
- BWF profile
Medal record
Women's badminton
Representing Indonesia
Asian Games
Bronze medal – third place	2018 Jakarta–Palembang	Women's team
Asia Mixed Team Championships
Bronze medal – third place	2019 Hong Kong	Mixed team
Asia Team Championships
Bronze medal – third place	2018 Alor Setar	Women's team
SEA Games
Silver medal – second place	2019 Philippines	Women's singles
Silver medal – second place	2019 Philippines	Women's team
World Junior Championships
Silver medal – second place	2013 Bangkok	Mixed team
Silver medal – second place	2014 Alor Setar	Mixed team
Asian Junior Championships
Bronze medal – third place	2013 Kota Kinabalu	Mixed team
Bronze medal – third place	2015 Bangkok	Mixed team

Ruselli Hartawan (born 27 December 1997) is an Indonesian badminton player. She is the member of Jaya Raya Jakarta badminton club, and selected to join the national team in 2013. She competed in the girls' singles badminton at the 2014 Summer Youth Olympics in Nanjing, China, but she was stopped in the quarter-finals after being defeated by Akane Yamaguchi of Japan. In 2017, she won the women's singles title at the national championships in Pangkal Pinang.

== Awards and nominations ==
Award	Year	Category	Result	Ref.
Indonesian Sport Awards	2018	Favorite Women's Team Athlete with 2018 Asian Games women's badminton team	Won	

== Achievements ==
=== SEA Games ===
Women's singles
Year	Venue	Opponent	Score	Result
2019	Muntinlupa Sports Complex, Metro Manila, Philippines	(Malaysia) Kisona Selvaduray	22–20, 14–21, 13–21	Silver

=== BWF Grand Prix (1 runner-up) ===
The BWF Grand Prix had two levels, the Grand Prix and Grand Prix Gold. It was a series of badminton tournaments sanctioned by the Badminton World Federation (BWF) and played between 2007 and 2017.

Women's singles
Year	Tournament	Opponent	Score	Result	Ref.
2014	Indonesian Masters	(Indonesia) Adriyanti Firdasari	14–21, 14–21	(silver) Runner-up	

BWF Grand Prix Gold tournament
BWF Grand Prix tournament

=== BWF International Challenge/Series (2 titles, 3 runners-up) ===
Women's singles
Year	Tournament	Opponent	Score	Result
2014	Bahrain International	(India) P. C. Thulasi	21–18, 21–23, 15–21	(silver) Runner-up
2016	Smiling Fish International	(Indonesia) Dinar Dyah Ayustine	10–21, 14–21	(silver) Runner-up
2017	Singapore International	(Malaysia) Goh Jin Wei	21–13, 10–21, 21–19	(gold) Winner
2017	Malaysia International	(Chinese Taipei) Lin Ying-chun	21–14, 21–13	(gold) Winner
2018	Finnish Open	(Indonesia) Gregoria Mariska Tunjung	7–21, 13–21	(silver) Runner-up

BWF International Challenge tournament
BWF International Series tournament

=== BWF Junior International (2 titles) ===
Girls' doubles
Year	Tournament	Partner	Opponent	Score	Result	Ref.
2012	Australian Junior International	(Indonesia) Lya Ersalita	(Australia) Joy Lai (Australia) Jennifer Tam	21–13, 17–21, 21–14	(gold) Winner	

Mixed doubles
Year	Tournament	Partner	Opponent	Score	Result	Ref.
2012	Australian Junior International	(Indonesia) Hafiz Faizal	(Indonesia) Putra Eka Rhoma (Indonesia) Lya Ersalita	18–21, 21–16, 21–15	(gold) Winner	

BWF Junior International Grand Prix tournament
BWF Junior International Challenge tournament
BWF Junior International Series tournament
BWF Junior Future Series tournament

== Performance timeline ==
Performance timeline

Key

W	Won	F	Finalist	SF	Semi-finalist
QF	Quarter-finalist	#R	Rounds 4, 3, 2, 1	RR	Round-robin stage
Q#	Qualification round	A	Absent	w/d	Withdrew
G	Gold	S	Silver	B	Bronze
NH	Not held	N/A	Not applicable	DNQ	Did not qualify

=== National team ===
- Junior level

Team events	2012	2013	2014	2015
Asian Junior Championships	A	B	QF	B
World Junior Championships	4th	S	S	A

- Senior level

Team events	2018	2019	2020
SEA Games	NH	S	NH
Asia Team Championships	B	NH	QF
Asia Mixed Team Championships	NH	B	NH
Asian Games	B	NH	

=== Individual competitions ===
==== Women's singles ====
- Junior level

Events	2012	2013	2014	2015
Asian Junior Championships	1R	2R	2R	1R
World Junior Championships	1R	3R	4R	A
Youth Olympic Games	NH		QF	NH

- Senior level

Events	2019	2020	2021
SEA Games	S	NH	A
Asian Championships	1R	NH	
World Championships	DNQ	NH	w/d

Tournament	BWF Superseries / Grand Prix					BWF World Tour					Best	Ref
Tournament	2013	2014	2015	2016	2017	2018	2019	2020	2021	2022	Best	Ref
Syed Modi International	NH	A				SF	A	NH		A	SF ('18)	
Spain Masters	NH					A	2R	A	2R	NH	2R ('19, '21)	
German Open	A						2R	NH		A	2R ('19)	
Swiss Open	A							NH	1R	A	1R ('21)	
Orléans Masters	N/A					SF	A	NH	A	2R	SF ('18)	
Thailand Open	NH		1R	2R	2R	Q1	1R	1R	NH	2R	2R ('16, '17, '22)	
Thailand Open	NH		1R	2R	2R	Q1	1R	1R	NH	2R	2R ('16, '17, '22)	
Indonesia Masters	1R	F	1R	2R	NH	A	2R	1R	1R	1R	F ('14)	
Indonesia Open	A	Q2	1R	1R	Q1	A	1R	NH	1R	A	1R ('15, '16, '19, '21)	
Malaysia Masters	A		1R	1R	1R	A	1R	2R	NH	Q2	2R ('20)	
Singapore Open	A		1R	A		1R	2R	NH		A	2R ('19)	
Chinese Taipei Open	A		Q2	A		2R	2R	NH		A	2R ('18, '19)	
Akita Masters	NH					A	QF	NH			QF ('19)	
Vietnam Open	A	1R	2R	1R	A			NH		QF	QF ('22)	
Indonesia Masters Super 100	NH					QF	QF	NH		QF	QF ('18, '19, '22)	
Denmark Open	A								1R	A	1R ('21)	
Hylo Open	A								1R	A	1R ('21)	
Macau Open	A	Q1	1R	A	1R	A	QF	NH			QF ('19)	
Hong Kong Open	A					1R	QF	NH			QF ('19)	
Australian Open	A						1R	NH		A	1R ('19)	
New Zealand Open	A		1R	A		1R	2R	NH			2R ('19)	
Chinese Taipei Masters	NH		A	2R	NH						2R ('16)	
Dutch Open	A		1R	A				NH	NA		1R ('15)	
Hyderabad Open	NH					2R	A	NH			2R ('18)	
Thailand Masters	NH			2R	A	1R	2R	1R	NH		2R ('16, '19)	
Year-end ranking	183	119	88	64	83	51	37	35	45	88	34	
Tournament	2013	2014	2015	2016	2017	2018	2019	2020	2021	2022	Best	Ref

==== Women's doubles ====
Tournament	BWF World Tour					Best
Tournament	2018	2019	2020	2021	2022	Best
Orléans Masters	A		NH	A	1R	1R ('22)
Thailand Open	A			NH	1R	1R ('22)
Hyderabad Open	2R	A	NH			2R ('18)
Year-end ranking	448	NA			346	308

== Record against selected opponents ==
Record against World Superseries finalists, World Championships semifinalists, and Olympic quarterfinalists, as well as all Olympic opponents.

- (China) He Bingjiao 0–4
- (China) Li Xuerui 1–2
- (China) Sun Yu 0–1
- (China) Yao Xue 0–1
- (Indonesia) Lindaweni Fanetri 0–1
- (Japan) Akane Yamaguchi 0–3
- (Japan) Yui Hashimoto 0–1
- (United States) Zhang Beiwen 1–2
- (South Korea) Sung Ji-hyun 0–2
- (South Korea) An Se-young 1–2
