= 2016 Thailand Open Grand Prix Gold =

Tournament details
- Dates: 4 – 9 October 2016
- Level: Grand Prix Gold
- Total prize money: US$120,000
- Venue: Nimibutr Stadium
- Location: Bangkok, Thailand

Champions
- Men's singles: (Thailand) Tanongsak Saensomboonsuk
- Women's singles: (Japan) Aya Ohori
- Men's doubles: (Indonesia) Berry Angriawan (Indonesia) Rian Agung Saputro
- Women's doubles: (Thailand) Puttita Supajirakul (Thailand) Sapsiree Taerattanachai
- Mixed doubles: (Malaysia) Tan Kian Meng (Malaysia) Lai Pei Jing

The 2016 Thailand Open Grand Prix Gold will be the 14th grand prix's badminton tournament of the 2016 BWF Grand Prix Gold and Grand Prix. The tournament will be held at Nimibutr Stadium in Bangkok in Thailand 4–9 October 2016 and had a total purse of $120,000.

== Men's singles ==
=== Seeds ===
1. (Indonesia) Ihsan Maulana Mustofa (first round)
2. (Indonesia) Sony Dwi Kuncoro (final)
3. (Chinese Taipei) Hsu Jen-hao (quarterfinals)
4. (Thailand) Boonsak Ponsana (third round)
5. (Thailand) Tanongsak Saensomboonsuk (champion)
6. (Chinese Taipei) Wang Tzu-wei (third round)
7. (India) Sameer Verma (first round)
8. (Japan) Kenta Nishimoto (semifinals)
9. (Japan) Takuma Ueda (second round)
10. (Japan) Kazumasa Sakai (third round)
11. (Malaysia) Soo Teck Zhi (second round)
12. (Malaysia) Chong Wei Feng (third round)
13. (Chinese Taipei) Lin Yu-hsien (first round)
14. (Thailand) Khosit Phetpradab (second round)
15. (India) Harsheel Dani (second round)
16. (Malaysia) Soong Joo Ven (first round)

=== Finals ===
Quarterfinals
(Thailand) Suppanyu Avihingsanon	8	18
5	(Thailand) Tanongsak Saensomboonsuk	21	21
3	(Chinese Taipei) Hsu Jen-hao	16	11
8	(Japan) Kenta Nishimoto	21	21
(Hong Kong) Lee Cheuk Yiu	21	17	21
(Malaysia) Liew Daren	12	21	15
(Chinese Taipei) Hsueh Hsuan-yi	12	15
2	(Indonesia) Sony Dwi Kuncoro	21	21

Semifinals
5	(Thailand) Tanongsak Saensomboonsuk	21	21
8	(Japan) Kenta Nishimoto	19	16
(Hong Kong) Lee Cheuk Yiu	21	16	17
2	(Indonesia) Sony Dwi Kuncoro	19	21	21

Final
5	(Thailand) Tanongsak Saensomboonsuk	21	21
2	(Indonesia) Sony Dwi Kuncoro	15	16

=== Top half ===
==== Section 1 ====
First Round
1	(Indonesia) I M Mustofa	17	21	18
(Thailand) S Avihingsanon	21	17	21
Q5	(Indonesia) J A Manasye
Q4	(Thailand) N Nantatheero	w	/	o
10	(Japan) K Sakai	21	21
(India) S Jaiswal	17	12
(Thailand) M Narongrit	12	22
(Japan) K Naraoka	21	24

Second Round
(Thailand) S Avihingsanon	21	21
Q4	(Thailand) N Nantatheero	10	15
10	(Japan) K Sakai	18	21	21
(Japan) K Naraoka	21	18	4

Third Round
(Thailand) S Avihingsanon	21	21
10	(Japan) K Sakai	17	18

==== Section 2 ====
First Round
5	(Thailand) T Saensomboonsuk	21	21
(Indonesia) M B Pangisthu	16	14
Q6	(Indonesia) Z A Hidayat	7	4
(Japan) R Takeshita	21	21
14	(Thailand) K Phetpradab	21	21
(Chinese Taipei) Chu H-c	14	12
(India) C R Yadav	16	15
(Indonesia) P A Maulana	21	21

Second Round
5	(Thailand) T Saensomboonsuk	21	18	21
(Japan) R Takeshita	11	21	7
14	(Thailand) K Phetpradab	17	16
(Indonesia) P A Maulana	21	21

Third Round
5	(Thailand) T Saensomboonsuk	21	21
(Indonesia) P A Maulana	18	19

==== Section 3 ====
First Round
3	(Chinese Taipei) Hsu J-h	23	22
(Thailand) K Imnark	21	20
(Thailand) K Laotrakul	17	21	18
(Chinese Taipei) Liu W-c	21	18	21
12	(Malaysia) Chong W F	20	21	21
(Indonesia) H K Wibowo	22	18	13
(Thailand) N Singrueang	18	21	21
Q7	(Thailand) K Buarung	21	18	15

Second Round
3	(Chinese Taipei) Hsu J-h	21	22
(Chinese Taipei) Liu W-c	11	12
12	(Malaysia) Chong W F	21	21
(Thailand) N Singrueang	18	19

Third Round
3	(Chinese Taipei) Hsu J-h	21	21
12	(Malaysia) Chong W F	15	10

==== Section 4 ====
First Round
8	(Japan) K Nishimoto	21	21
Q2	(Thailand) C Mekmusik	8	7
(Indonesia) S H Rhustavito	21	21
(Hong Kong) Chan Y K	10	16
15	(India) H Dani	21	21
(Malaysia) M A Abdul Latif	18	14
(Thailand) S Tovannakasem	12	9
(Chinese Taipei) Yang C-c	21	21

Second Round
8	(Japan) K Nishimoto	21	21
(Indonesia) S H Rhustavito	13	8
15	(India) H Dani	12	27	15
(Chinese Taipei) Yang C-c	21	25	21

Third Round
8	(Japan) K Nishimoto	20	21	21
(Chinese Taipei) Yang C-c	22	14	16

=== Bottom half ===
==== Section 5 ====
First Round
(Hong Kong) Lee C Y	21	21
(Japan) Y Igarashi	17	17
(Chinese Taipei) Lu C-h	15	15
11	(Malaysia) Soo T Z	21	21
(Hong Kong) Lee C W	21	21
(Indonesia) N E Sulistyo	13	16
(Malaysia) Yeoh K E	0^{r}
6	(Chinese Taipei) Wang T-w	11

Second Round
(Hong Kong) Lee C Y	11	27	21
11	(Malaysia) Soo T Z	21	25	14
(Hong Kong) Lee C W	9	11
6	(Chinese Taipei) Wang T-w	21	21

Third Round
(Hong Kong) Lee C Y	17	21	21
6	(Chinese Taipei) Wang T-w	21	17	15

==== Section 6 ====
First Round
(Thailand) T Huansuriya	17	12
(Malaysia) Liew D	21	21
(Chinese Taipei) Shih K-c	21	21
16	(Malaysia) Soong J V	19	19
(Thailand) K Leelavechabutr	14	11
(Indonesia) W Y Prasetyo	21	21
(Indonesia) S Santoso
4	(Thailand) B Ponsana	w	/	o

Second Round
(Malaysia) Liew D	21	21
(Chinese Taipei) Shih K-c	14	15
(Indonesia) W Y Prasetyo	20	14
4	(Thailand) B Ponsana	22	21

Third Round
(Malaysia) Liew D	22	21	21
4	(Thailand) B Ponsana	24	12	17

==== Section 7 ====
First Round
Q8	(Thailand) K Wanaroon	11	15
(Chinese Taipei) Hsueh H-y	21	21
Q3	(Thailand) P Nipornram	8	5
9	(Japan) T Ueda	21	21
(Indonesia) E Sukamta	23	14	19
(Thailand) A Namkul	21	21	21
(Thailand) K Wangcharoen	14	21	21
7	(India) S Verma	21	19	17

Second Round
(Chinese Taipei) Hsueh H-y	23	24
9	(Japan) T Ueda	21	22
(Thailand) A Namkul	10	16
(Thailand) K Wangcharoen	21	21

Third Round
(Chinese Taipei) Hsueh H-y	21	21
(Thailand) K Wangcharoen	13	17

==== Section 8 ====
First Round
(Thailand) P Thongnuam	21	20	21
(Indonesia) F I Hadmadi	18	22	15
(Indonesia) F A Kholik	21	15	21
13	(Chinese Taipei) Lin Y-h	15	21	15
Q1	(Thailand) K Atthaviroj	12	15
(Indonesia) V A Saputra	21	21
(Thailand) P Jarasjindawong	6	10
2	(Indonesia) S D Kuncoro	21	21

Second Round
(Thailand) P Thongnuam	21	15	21
(Indonesia) F A Kholik	12	21	18
(Indonesia) V A Saputra	21	20	12
2	(Indonesia) S D Kuncoro	13	22	21

Third Round
(Thailand) P Thongnuam	22	13
2	(Indonesia) S D Kuncoro	24	21

== Women's singles ==
=== Seeds ===
1. (Thailand) Ratchanok Intanon (withdrew)
2. (Thailand) Porntip Buranaprasertsuk (second round)
3. (Thailand) Busanan Ongbamrungphan (final)
4. (Thailand) Nitchaon Jindapon (semifinals)
5. (Japan) Yui Hashimoto (second round)
6. (Malaysia) Tee Jing Yi (quarterfinals)
7. (Singapore) Liang Xiaoyu (quarterfinals)
8. (Japan) Kaori Imabeppu (first round)

=== Finals ===
Semifinals
(Japan) Aya Ohori	21	12	21
4	(Thailand) Nitchaon Jindapon	12	21	13
3	(Thailand) Busanan Ongbamrungphan	22	21
(Malaysia) Goh Jin Wei	20	13

Final
(Japan) Aya Ohori	25	21
3	(Thailand) Busanan Ongbamrungphan	23	8

=== Top half ===
==== Section 1 ====
First Round
PFQ	(Thailand) S Suwannakitborihan	8^{r}
(Singapore) Yeo J M	16
(Japan) A Ohori	21	21
(Chinese Taipei) Lee C-h	15	18
6	(Malaysia) Tee J Y	22	21
(Indonesia) R A Riodingin	20	8
(Thailand) P Chochuwong	21	21
(Singapore) Grace Chua H Z	8	8

Second Round
(Singapore) Yeo J M	18	9
(Japan) A Ohori	21	21
6	(Malaysia) Tee J Y	10	22	21
(Thailand) P Chochuwong	21	20	15

Quarterfinals
(Japan) A Ohori	21	21
6	(Malaysia) Tee J Y	13	6

==== Section 2 ====
First Round
4	(Thailand) N Jindapon	20	21	21
PFQ	(Japan) S Takahashi	22	19	11
(Chinese Taipei) Yu C-h	21	21	21
Q1	(Thailand) P Chamnaktan	11	23	13
8	(Japan) K Imabeppu	20	10
(Indonesia) D D Ayustine	22	21
(Thailand) S Katethong	23	14	15
(Indonesia) R Hartawan	21	21	21

Second Round
4	(Thailand) N Jindapon	21	19	21
(Chinese Taipei) Yu C-h	11	21	11
(Indonesia) D D Ayustine	21	21
(Indonesia) R Hartawan	13	10

Quarterfinals
4	(Thailand) N Jindapon	21	21
(Indonesia) D D Ayustine	12	15

=== Bottom half ===
==== Section 3 ====
First Round
Q2	(India) S K P Kudaravalli	17	21	15
(Indonesia) Y Y Susanto	21	16	21
(Indonesia) F Angguni	8	20
7	(Singapore) Liang XY	21	22
Q4	(Thailand) L Kanlaha	11	14
(Indonesia) Fitriani	21	21
(Chinese Taipei) Hu L-f	12	15
3	(Thailand) B Ongbamrungphan	21	21

Second Round
(Indonesia) Y Y Susanto	16	21	6
7	(Singapore) Liang XY	21	16	21
(Indonesia) Fitriani	11	11
3	(Thailand) B Ongbamrungphan	21	21

Quarterfinals
7	(Singapore) Liang XY	22	13	12
3	(Thailand) B Ongbamrungphan	20	21	21

==== Section 4 ====
First Round
(Malaysia) Ho Y M	16	21	21
(Chinese Taipei) Chiang M-h	21	19	18
Q3	(Thailand) N Aimsaard	12	10
5	(Japan) Y Hashimoto	21	21
(Malaysia) Goh J W	21	21
(Indonesia) H Ramadhini	15	10
(Indonesia) H Desi	17	18
2	(Thailand) P Buranaprasertsuk	21	21

Second Round
(Malaysia) Ho Y M	21	14	21
5	(Japan) Y Hashimoto	19	21	16
(Malaysia) Goh J W	21	16	21
2	(Thailand) P Buranaprasertsuk	16	21	17

Quarterfinals
(Malaysia) Ho Y M	17	13
(Malaysia) Goh J W	21	21

== Men's doubles ==
=== Seeds ===
1. (Malaysia) Koo Kien Keat / Tan Boon Heong (first round)
2. (Indonesia) Berry Angriawan / Rian Agung Saputro (champion)
3. (Thailand) Bodin Issara / Nipitphon Puangpuapech (quarterfinals)
4. (Chinese Taipei) Lee Jhe-huei / Lee Yang (quarterfinals)
5. (Indonesia) Hardianto / Kenas Adi Haryanto (second round)
6. (Malaysia) Hoon Thien How / Teo Kok Siang (quarterfinals)
7. (Hong Kong) Or Chin Chung / Tang Chun Man (quarterfinals)
8. (Indonesia) Hendra Aprida Gunawan / Markis Kido (second round)

=== Finals ===
Semifinals
(Japan) Takuto Inoue (Japan) Yuki Kaneko	21	24
(Indonesia) Fajar Alfian (Indonesia) Muhammad Rian Ardianto	19	22
(Malaysia) Lim Khim Wah (Malaysia) Ong Jian Guo	17	18
2	(Indonesia) Berry Angriawan (Indonesia) Rian Agung Saputro	21	21

Final
(Japan) Takuto Inoue (Japan) Yuki Kaneko	21	14	18
2	(Indonesia) Berry Angriawan (Indonesia) Rian Agung Saputro	17	21	21

=== Top half ===
==== Section 1 ====
First Round
1	(Malaysia) Koo K K (Malaysia) Tan B H	20	21	15
(Japan) T Inoue (Japan) Y Kaneko	22	19	21
(Thailand) S Anugritayawon (Thailand) P Vilailak	19	14
(Malaysia) Ong Y S (Malaysia) Teo E Y	21	21
7	(Hong Kong) Or C C (Hong Kong) Tang C M	21	19	21
(Malaysia) N M A Ayub (Malaysia) J Singh	19	21	18
(Chinese Taipei) Liao M-c (Chinese Taipei) Lu C-h	24	21
Q1	(Malaysia) M A Abdul Latif (Thailand) W Buranakuea	22	16

Second Round
(Japan) T Inoue (Japan) Y Kaneko	21	16	21
(Malaysia) Ong Y S (Malaysia) Teo E Y	17	21	19
7	(Hong Kong) Or C C (Hong Kong) Tang C M	21	21
(Chinese Taipei) Liao M-c (Chinese Taipei) Lu C-h	19	17

Quarterfinals
(Japan) T Inoue (Japan) Y Kaneko	21	21
7	(Hong Kong) Or C C (Hong Kong) Tang C M	18	14

==== Section 2 ====
First Round
4	(Chinese Taipei) Lee J-h (Chinese Taipei) Lee Y	21	21
Q4	(Thailand) V Tanupat (Thailand) W Uttamang	13	17
(Malaysia) Tan C T (Malaysia) Tan W G	19	17
(Thailand) W Ampunsuwan (Thailand) T Isriyanet	21	21
5	(Indonesia) Hardianto (Indonesia) K A Haryanto	22	21
(Thailand) D Puavaranukroh (Thailand) P Kuna-Anuvit	20	15
(Singapore) Terry Hee Y K (Singapore) Loh K H	16	21	17
(Indonesia) F Alfian (Indonesia) M R Ardianto	21	14	21

Second Round
4	(Chinese Taipei) Lee J-h (Chinese Taipei) Lee Y	21	21
(Thailand) W Ampunsuwan (Thailand) T Isriyanet	12	12
5	(Indonesia) Hardianto (Indonesia) K A Haryanto	14	21	16
(Indonesia) F Alfian (Indonesia) M R Ardianto	21	18	21

Quarterfinals
4	(Chinese Taipei) Lee J-h (Chinese Taipei) Lee Y	21	27	19
(Indonesia) F Alfian (Indonesia) M R Ardianto	13	29	21

=== Bottom half ===
==== Section 3 ====
First Round
(Chinese Taipei) Liao K-h (Chinese Taipei) Lu C-p	12	18
(Malaysia) Lim K W (Malaysia) Ong J G	21	21
(Thailand) S Jomkoh (Thailand) K Kedren	19	21	18
8	(Indonesia) H A Gunawan (Indonesia) M Kido	21	16	21
(Vietnam) Bao M (Vietnam) Duong B D	21	17	17
(Singapore) D B Chrisnanta (Singapore) H Wijaya	10	21	21
(Hong Kong) Ho W L (Hong Kong) Tam C H	16	17
3	(Thailand) B Issara (Thailand) N Puangpuapech	21	21

Second Round
(Malaysia) Lim K W (Malaysia) Ong J G	21	21
8	(Indonesia) H A Gunawan (Indonesia) M Kido	17	17
(Singapore) D B Chrisnanta (Singapore) H Wijaya	17	18
3	(Thailand) B Issara (Thailand) N Puangpuapech	21	21

Quarterfinals
(Malaysia) Lim K W (Malaysia) Ong J G	21	17	21
3	(Thailand) B Issara (Thailand) N Puangpuapech	15	21	14

==== Section 4 ====
First Round
Q2	(Chinese Taipei) Lu C-y (Chinese Taipei) Yang P-h	21	21
(Hong Kong) Chan T K (Hong Kong) Law C H	15	13
(Chinese Taipei) Chang K-c (Chinese Taipei) Liang J-w	10	19
6	(Malaysia) Hoon T H (Malaysia) Teo K S	21	21
Q3	(Malaysia) Lee J Y (Malaysia) Lim Z T	21	21
(Indonesia) D Juang (Indonesia) R A Sidarta	12	11
(Indonesia) L A Nughoro (Thailand) P Bowornwatanuwong	6	13
2	(Indonesia) B Angriawan (Indonesia) R A Saputro	21	21

Second Round
Q2	(Chinese Taipei) Lu C-y (Chinese Taipei) Yang P-h	21	21	10
6	(Malaysia) Hoon T H (Malaysia) Teo K S	23	17	21
Q3	(Malaysia) Lee J Y (Malaysia) Lim Z T	12	16
2	(Indonesia) B Angriawan (Indonesia) R A Saputro	21	21

Quarterfinals
6	(Malaysia) Hoon T H (Malaysia) Teo K S	16	17
2	(Indonesia) B Angriawan (Indonesia) R A Saputro	21	21

== Women's doubles ==
=== Seeds ===
1. (Thailand) Puttita Supajirakul / Sapsiree Taerattanachai (champion)
2. (Thailand) Jongkolphan Kititharakul / Rawinda Prajongjai (semifinals)
3. (Thailand) Chayanit Chaladchalam / Phataimas Muenwong (quarterfinals)
4. (Indonesia) Apriani Rahayu / Jauza Fadhila Sugiarto (withdrew)
5. (Japan) Mayu Matsumoto / Wakana Nagahara (final)
6. (Indonesia) Keshya Nurvita Hanadia / Devi Tika Permatasari (quarterfinals)
7. (Malaysia) Chow Mei Kuan / Lee Meng Yean (quarterfinals)
8. (Chinese Taipei) Chen Szu-yu / Wu Ti-jung (quarterfinals)

=== Finals ===
Semifinals
1	(Thailand) Puttita Supajirakul (Thailand) Sapsiree Taerattanachai	21	21
(Japan) Miki Kashihara (Japan) Miyuki Kato	14	13
5	(Japan) Mayu Matsumoto (Japan) Wakana Nagahara	21	21
2	(Thailand) Jongkolphan Kititharakul (Thailand) Rawinda Prajongjai	19	17

Final
1	(Thailand) Puttita Supajirakul (Thailand) Sapsiree Taerattanachai	21	21
5	(Japan) Mayu Matsumoto (Japan) Wakana Nagahara	12	17

=== Top half ===
==== Section 1 ====
First Round
1	(Thailand) P Supajirakul (Thailand) S Taerattanachai	21	21
Q2	(Indonesia) D F Alviani (Indonesia) I Ratnasari	4	10
(Thailand) N Chatupornkarnchana (Thailand) S Chumnibannakarn	11	16
(Chinese Taipei) Kuo Y-w (Chinese Taipei) Lin T-y	21	21
7	(Malaysia) Chow M K (Malaysia) Lee M Y	21	21
Q4	(Hong Kong) Ng N Y (Hong Kong) Yuen S Y	18	15
(Thailand) C Charoenwat (Thailand) T Kaweenuntavong	18	9
(Indonesia) R Amelia (Malaysia) Anna Cheong C Y	21	21

Second Round
1	(Thailand) P Supajirakul (Thailand) S Taerattanachai	21	21
(Chinese Taipei) Kuo Y-w (Chinese Taipei) Lin T-y	10	13
7	(Malaysia) Chow M K (Malaysia) Lee M Y	21	21
(Indonesia) R Amelia (Malaysia) Anna Cheong C Y	12	16

Quarterfinals
1	(Thailand) P Supajirakul (Thailand) S Taerattanachai	21	21
7	(Malaysia) Chow M K (Malaysia) Lee M Y	9	14

==== Section 2 ====
First Round
PFQ	(Chinese Taipei) Cheng C-y (Chinese Taipei) Chien H-y	18	19
(Japan) M Kashihara (Japan) M Kato	21	21
(Malaysia) Lee Z Q (India) P Sawant	21	21
(Thailand) S Paewsampran (Thailand) K Sudjaipraparat	13	19
8	(Chinese Taipei) Chen S-y (Chinese Taipei) Wu T-j	21	21
Q3	(Thailand) P Bonoi (Thailand) Y Yodchampu	13	7
Q1	(Thailand) M Bowonwitthanakul (Thailand) K Pongpuek	11	4
(Thailand) P Eksorakul (Thailand) N Saengchote	21	21

Second Round
(Japan) M Kashihara (Japan) M Kato	21	21
(Malaysia) Lee Z Q (India) P Sawant	10	13
8	(Chinese Taipei) Chen S-y (Chinese Taipei) Wu T-j	15	21	21
(Thailand) P Eksorakul (Thailand) N Saengchote	21	19	15

Quarterfinals
(Japan) M Kashihara (Japan) M Kato	21	21
8	(Chinese Taipei) Chen S-y (Chinese Taipei) Wu T-j	19	16

=== Bottom half ===
==== Section 3 ====
First Round
(Hong Kong) Ng T Y (Hong Kong) Yeung N T	21	21
(Thailand) S Kanchanasaka (Thailand) K Sukklad	15	15
(Thailand) P Chochuwong (Thailand) C Teachavorasinskun	20	15
5	(Japan) M Matsumoto (Japan) W Nagahara	22	21
(Thailand) R Iamratanamaetheekul (Thailand) S Mingchua	16	13
PFQ	(Chinese Taipei) Cheng Y-c (Chinese Taipei) Hu L-f	21	21
(Indonesia) N Herloardjo (Indonesia) R S Putri	4	4
3	(Thailand) C Chaladchalam (Thailand) P Muenwong	21	21

Second Round
(Hong Kong) Ng T Y (Hong Kong) Yeung N T	14	11
5	(Japan) M Matsumoto (Japan) W Nagahara	21	21
PFQ	(Chinese Taipei) Cheng Y-c (Chinese Taipei) Hu L-f	15	12
3	(Thailand) C Chaladchalam (Thailand) P Muenwong	21	21

Quarterfinals
5	(Japan) M Matsumoto (Japan) W Nagahara	15	21	21
3	(Thailand) C Chaladchalam (Thailand) P Muenwong	21	14	17

==== Section 4 ====
First Round
(Chinese Taipei) Chen H-h (Chinese Taipei) Huang M-c	19	21	22
(Thailand) R Laisuan (Thailand) A Sapniti	21	9	20
(Thailand) N Chatputtarin (Thailand) F Loog	18	17
6	(Indonesia) K N Hanadia (Indonesia) D T Permatasari	21	21
(Thailand) T Kiawcha-On (Thailand) T Wongya	17	16
(Indonesia) D Fitriani (Indonesia) N Melati	21	21
(Chinese Taipei) Chiang K-h (Chinese Taipei) Hung S-h	7	21	13
2	(Thailand) J Kititharakul (Thailand) R Prajongjai	21	14	21

Second Round
(Chinese Taipei) Chen H-h (Chinese Taipei) Huang M-c	12	22	17
6	(Indonesia) K N Hanadia (Indonesia) D T Permatasari	21	20	21
(Indonesia) D Fitriani (Indonesia) N Melati	14	13
2	(Thailand) J Kititharakul (Thailand) R Prajongjai	21	21

Quarterfinals
6	(Indonesia) K N Hanadia (Indonesia) D T Permatasari	18	10
2	(Thailand) J Kititharakul (Thailand) R Prajongjai	21	21

== Mixed doubles ==
=== Seeds ===
1. (Thailand) Bodin Issara / Savitree Amitrapai (first round)
2. (Thailand) Dechapol Puavaranukroh / Sapsiree Taerattanachai (semifinals)
3. (Malaysia) Tan Kian Meng / Lai Pei Jing (champion)
4. (Singapore) Terry Hee Yong Kai / Tan Wei Han (second round)
5. (Japan) Yuta Watanabe / Arisa Higashino (withdrew)
6. (Chinese Taipei) Liao Min-chun / Chen Hsiao-huan (quarterfinals)
7. (Indonesia) Alfian Eko Prasetya / Annisa Saufika (first round)
8. (Indonesia) Edi Subaktiar / Richi Puspita Dili (first round)

=== Finals ===
Semifinals
(Hong Kong) Tang Chun Man (Hong Kong) Tse Ying Suet	18	21	21
(Thailand) Supak Jomkoh (Thailand) Puttita Supajirakul	21	13	15
3	(Malaysia) Tan Kian Meng (Malaysia) Lai Pei Jing	22	21	21
2	(Thailand) Dechapol Puavaranukroh (Thailand) Sapsiree Taerattanachai	24	17	14

Final
(Hong Kong) Tang Chun Man (Hong Kong) Tse Ying Suet	16	20
3	(Malaysia) Tan Kian Meng (Malaysia) Lai Pei Jing	21	22

=== Top half ===
==== Section 1 ====
First Round
1	(Thailand) B Issara (Thailand) S Amitrapai	21	15	20
(Chinese Taipei) Tseng M-h (Chinese Taipei) Hu L-f	11	21	22
(Hong Kong) Tang C M (Hong Kong) Tse Y S	21	21
(Chinese Taipei) Liang J-w (Chinese Taipei) Peng L-t	10	14
7	(Indonesia) A E Prasetya (Indonesia) A Saufika	17	21	17
(Chinese Taipei) Chang K-c (Chinese Taipei) Chang H-t	21	14	21
PFQ	(Thailand) N Sattanako (Thailand) R Iamratanamaetheekul	15	10
(Malaysia) Y Khrishnan (India) P Sawant	21	21

Second Round
(Chinese Taipei) Tseng M-h (Chinese Taipei) Hu L-f	21	13	15
(Hong Kong) Tang C M (Hong Kong) Tse Y S	11	21	21
(Chinese Taipei) Chang K-c (Chinese Taipei) Chang H-t	21	21
(Malaysia) Y Khrishnan (India) P Sawant	19	13

Quarterfinals
(Hong Kong) Tang C M (Hong Kong) Tse Y S	21	21
(Chinese Taipei) Chang K-c (Chinese Taipei) Chang H-t	9	11

==== Section 2 ====
First Round
4	(Singapore) Terry Hee Y K (Singapore) Tan W H	13	26	21
(Indonesia) L A Nugroho (Indonesia) R Amelia	21	24	19
(Indonesia) D Juang (Indonesia) K N Hanadia	10	15
Q3	(Hong Kong) Tam C H (Hong Kong) Ng T Y	21	21
PFQ	(Chinese Taipei) Lu C-p (Chinese Taipei) Cheng C-y	21	17	21
(Chinese Taipei) Yang P-h (Chinese Taipei) Cheng Y-c	12	21	14
(Thailand) S Jomkoh (Thailand) P Supajirakul	21	17	21
(Chinese Taipei) Lee J-h (Chinese Taipei) Wu T-j	15	21	17

Second Round
4	(Singapore) Terry Hee Y K (Singapore) Tan W H	21	15	18
Q3	(Hong Kong) Tam C H (Hong Kong) Ng T Y	16	21	21
PFQ	(Chinese Taipei) Lu C-p (Chinese Taipei) Cheng C-y	10	21
(Thailand) S Jomkoh (Thailand) P Supajirakul	21	23

Quarterfinals
(Hong Kong) Tam C H (Hong Kong) Ng T Y	17	21	12
(Thailand) S Jomkoh (Thailand) P Supajirakul	21	15	21

=== Bottom half ===
==== Section 3 ====
First Round
Q1	(Thailand) W Buranakuea (Thailand) T Kleebyeeson	11	12
(Thailand) P Thongnuam (Thailand) N Saengchote	21	21
(Thailand) T Viriyangkura (Thailand) T Wongya	14	15
6	(Chinese Taipei) Liao M-c (Chinese Taipei) Chen H-h	21	21
Q4	(Thailand) P Nipornram (Thailand) R Laisuan	21	13
(Indonesia) R Widianto (Indonesia) G E Widjaja	23	21
(Indonesia) H Rumengan (Indonesia) R S Putri	9	7
3	(Malaysia) Tan K M (Malaysia) Lai P J	21	21

Second Round
(Thailand) P Thongnuam (Thailand) N Saengchote	10	19
6	(Chinese Taipei) Liao M-c (Chinese Taipei) Chen H-h	21	21
(Indonesia) R Widianto (Indonesia) G E Widjaja	19	18
3	(Malaysia) Tan K M (Malaysia) Lai P J	21	21

Quarterfinals
6	(Chinese Taipei) Liao M-c (Chinese Taipei) Chen H-h	15	21	11
3	(Malaysia) Tan K M (Malaysia) Lai P J	21	19	21

==== Section 4 ====
First Round
(Thailand) N Puangpuapech (Thailand) J Kititharakul	21	19	21
(Chinese Taipei) Lee Y (Chinese Taipei) Kuo Y-w	19	21	19
(Singapore) D B Chrisnanta (Singapore) P S D Citra	8	22	21
8	(Indonesia) E Subaktiar (Indonesia) R P Dili	21	20	18
(Indonesia) R A Nugroho (Indonesia) M Mahmudin	21	21
(Thailand) P Kuna-Anuvit (Thailand) K Sudjaipraparat	19	16
Q2	(Hong Kong) Mak H C (Hong Kong) Yueng N T	10	21	13
2	(Thailand) D Puavaranukroh (Thailand) S Taerattanachai	21	19	21

Second Round
(Thailand) N Puangpuapech (Thailand) J Kititharakul	21	21
(Singapore) D B Chrisnanta (Singapore) P S D Citra	14	11
(Indonesia) R A Nugroho (Indonesia) M Mahmudin	17	15
2	(Thailand) D Puavaranukroh (Thailand) S Taerattanachai	21	21

Quarterfinals
(Thailand) N Puangpuapech (Thailand) J Kititharakul	16	19
2	(Thailand) D Puavaranukroh (Thailand) S Taerattanachai	21	21

Preceded by 2016 Indonesian Masters Grand Prix Gold	BWF Grand Prix and Grand Prix Gold; 2016 BWF Season	Succeeded by 2016 Russia Open Grand Prix
