= Fitriani =

Indonesian badminton player (born 1998)

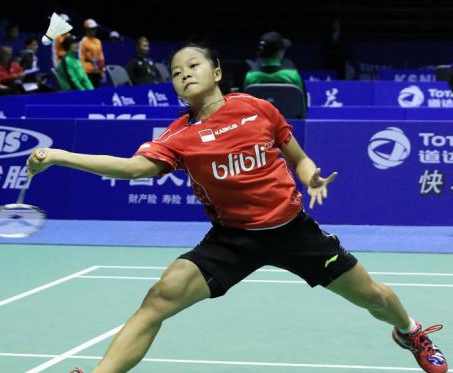
- Fitriani in 2016

Personal information
- Born: 27 December 1998 (age 27) Garut, West Java, Indonesia
- Height: 1.55 m (5 ft 1 in)
- Weight: 45 kg (99 lb)

Sport
- Country: Indonesia
- Sport: Badminton
- Handedness: Right
- Coached by: Minarti Timur

Women's singles
- Highest ranking: 20 (26 October 2017)
- BWF profile
Medal record
Women's badminton
Representing Indonesia
Sudirman Cup
Bronze medal – third place	2019 Nanning	Mixed team
Asian Games
Bronze medal – third place	2018 Jakarta–Palembang	Women's team
Asia Mixed Team Championships
Bronze medal – third place	2019 Hong Kong	Mixed team
Asia Team Championships
Bronze medal – third place	2018 Alor Setar	Women's team
Islamic Solidarity Games
Silver medal – second place	2013 Palembang	Women's team
Bronze medal – third place	2013 Palembang	Women's singles
SEA Games
Silver medal – second place	2019 Philippines	Women's team
Bronze medal – third place	2017 Kuala Lumpur	Women's team
World Junior Championships
Silver medal – second place	2013 Bangkok	Mixed team
Silver medal – second place	2014 Alor Setar	Mixed team
Asian Junior Championships
Bronze medal – third place	2013 Kota Kinabalu	Mixed team

Fitriani (born 27 December 1998) is an Indonesian badminton player specializing in women's singles and women's doubles discipline affiliated with Exist club. She won team silver at the 2019 SEA Games and bronze medals at the 2017 SEA Games and 2018 Asian Games. She was crowned as the women's singles champions at the 2023 Indonesian national championships.

== Awards and nominations ==
Award	Year	Category	Result	Ref.
Indonesian Sport Awards	2018	Favorite Women's Team Athlete with 2018 Asian Games women's badminton team	Won	

== Achievements ==
=== Islamic Solidarity Games ===
Women's singles
Year	Venue	Opponent	Score	Result	Ref.
2013	Dempo Sports Hall; Palembang, Indonesia	(Turkey) Neslihan Yiğit	13–21, 21–11, 18–21	Bronze	

=== BWF World Tour (1 title) ===
The BWF World Tour, which was announced on 19 March 2017 and implemented in 2018, is a series of elite badminton tournaments sanctioned by the Badminton World Federation (BWF). The BWF World Tour is divided into levels of World Tour Finals, Super 1000, Super 750, Super 500, Super 300 (part of the HSBC World Tour), and the BWF Tour Super 100.

Women's singles
Year	Tournament	Level	Opponent	Score	Result	Ref.
2019	Thailand Masters	Super 300	(Thailand) Busanan Ongbamrungphan	21–12, 21–14	(gold) Winner	

=== BWF Grand Prix (1 runner-up) ===
The BWF Grand Prix had two levels, the Grand Prix and Grand Prix Gold. It was a series of badminton tournaments sanctioned by the Badminton World Federation (BWF) and played between 2007 and 2017.

Women's singles
Year	Tournament	Opponent	Score	Result	Ref.
2015	Vietnam Open	(Japan) Saena Kawakami	24–26, 21–18, 10–21	(silver) Runner-up	

BWF Grand Prix Gold tournament
BWF Grand Prix tournament

=== BWF International Challenge/Series (4 titles, 1 runner-up) ===
Women's singles
Year	Tournament	Opponent	Score	Result	Ref.
2015	Indonesia International	(Indonesia) Aprilia Yuswandari	13–21, 21–13, 21–13	(gold) Winner	
2016	Orléans International	(Malaysia) Goh Jin Wei	21–15, 10–21, 7–21	(silver) Runner-up	
2016	Indonesia International	(Indonesia) Hanna Ramadini	21–19, 21–18	(gold) Winner	

Mixed doubles
Year	Tournament	Partner	Opponent	Score	Result	Ref.
2024	Bonn International	(Indonesia) Alden Lefilson Putra Mainaky	(Turkey) Emre Sonmez (Turkey) Yasemen Bektaş	21–13, 21–17	(gold) Winner	
2024	Lithuanian International	(Indonesia) Alden Lefilson Putra Mainaky	(Sweden) Martin Norrman (Sweden) Malena Norrman	21–18, 21–13	(gold) Winner	

BWF International Challenge tournament
BWF International Series tournament
BWF Future Series tournament

=== BWF Junior International (2 titles) ===
Girls' singles
Year	Tournament	Opponent	Score	Result	Ref.
2013	Indonesia Junior International	(Indonesia) Gregoria Mariska Tunjung	21–18, 21–16	(gold) Winner	
2014	Indonesia Junior International	(Indonesia) Gregoria Mariska Tunjung	21–17, 21–10	(gold) Winner	

BWF Junior International Grand Prix tournament
BWF Junior International Challenge tournament
BWF Junior International Series tournament
BWF Junior Future Series tournament

== Performance timeline ==
Key

W	Won	F	Finalist	SF	Semi-finalist
QF	Quarter-finalist	#R	Rounds 4, 3, 2, 1	RR	Round-robin stage
Q#	Qualification round	A	Absent	w/d	Withdrew
G	Gold	S	Silver	B	Bronze
NH	Not held	N/A	Not applicable	DNQ	Did not qualify

=== National team ===
- Junior level

Team events	2013	2014
Asian Junior Championships	B	QF
World Junior Championships	S	S

- Senior level

Team events	2016	2017	2018	2019
SEA Games	NH	B	NH	S
Asia Championships	QF	NH	B	NH
Asia Mixed Team Championships	NH	A	NH	B
Asian Games	NH		B	NH
Uber Cup	QF	NH	QF	NH
Sudirman Cup	NH	RR	NH	B

Team event	2013
Islamic Solidarity Games	S

=== Individual competitions ===
==== Junior level ====
- Girls' singles

Events	2013	2014
Asian Junior Championships	2R	1R
World Junior Championships	2R	4R

==== Senior level ====
===== Women's singles =====
Events	2016	2017	2018	2019	2020	2021
Asian Championships	1R	1R	A	1R	NH	
Asian Games	NH		R16	NH		
World Championships	NH	A	2R	2R	NH	A

Event	2013
Islamic Solidarity Games	B

Tournament	BWF Superseries / Grand Prix				BWF World Tour					Best
Tournament	2014	2015	2016	2017	2018	2019	2020	2021	2022	Best
India Open	A						NH		w/d	
Syed Modi International	A		1R	SF	A		NH		A	SF ('17)
Spain Masters	NH				A	2R	A		NH	2R ('19)
German Open	A				1R	2R	NH		A	2R ('19)
All England Open	A			1R	2R	1R	A			2R ('18)
Swiss Open	A			SF	A		NH	A		SF ('17)
Korea Open	A			1R	A	2R	NH		A	2R ('19)
Korea Masters	A	1R	A	1R	QF	A	NH		A	QF ('18)
Thailand Open	NH	2R	2R	A	1R	QF	A	NH	2R	QF ('19)
Indonesia Masters	2R	1R	1R	NH	2R	2R	1R	1R	A	2R ('14, '18, '19)
Indonesia Open	A		2R	2R	1R	1R	NH	1R	A	2R ('16, '17)
Malaysia Open	A				1R	1R	NH		1R	1R ('18, '19, '22)
Malaysia Masters	A		Q2	QF	1R	2R	1R	NH	2R	QF ('17)
Singapore Open	A			2R	A	1R	NH		A	2R ('17)
Chinese Taipei Open	A	2R	1R	A	QF	QF	NH		A	QF ('18, '19)
Japan Open	A			1R	A	1R	NH		A	1R ('17, '19)
Vietnam Open	A	F	QF	A			NH		A	F ('15)
Indonesia Masters Super 100	NA				QF	A	NH		2R	QF ('18)
Denmark Open	A					1R	A			1R ('19)
French Open	A				1R	2R	NH	A		2R ('19)
SaarLorLux Open	A				QF	A				QF ('18)
Macau Open	A	1R	2R	2R	A		NH			2R ('16, '17)
Australian Open	A					1R	NH		A	1R ('19)
New Zealand Open	A			SF	2R	2R	NH			SF ('17)
China Open	A					1R	NH			1R (2019)
Fuzhou China Open	A					1R	NH			1R ('19)
Chinese Taipei Masters	NA	1R	1R	NA						1R ('15, '16)
Thailand Masters	NA		A			W	1R	NH		W ('19)
Year-end ranking	231	78	40	24	33	28	33	42	115	20
Tournament	2014	2015	2016	2017	2018	2019	2020	2021	2022	Best

===== Women's doubles =====
- Senior level

Tournament	BWF World Tour		Best
Tournament	2021	2022	Best
India Open	NH	w/d	
Thailand Open	NH	1R	1R ('22)
Indonesia Masters	2R	A	2R ('21)
Indonesia Open	2R	A	2R ('21)
Indonesia Masters Super 100	NH	2R	2R ('22)
Year-end ranking	156	317	119
Tournament	2021	2022	Best

== Career overview ==
Singles	Played	Wins	Losses	Balance
Total	210	112	98	+14

Women's doubles	Played	Wins	Losses	Balance
Total	3	0	3	-3

== Record against selected opponents ==
Head to head (H2H) against World Superseries finalists, World Championships semifinalists, and Olympic quarterfinalists:

Women's singles

Player	M	W	L	Diff.
(China) Chen Yufei	8	2	6	–4
(China) He Bingjiao	4	0	4	–4
(India) P. V. Sindhu	5	0	5	–5
(India) Saina Nehwal	5	0	5	–5
(Japan) Akane Yamaguchi	2	1	1	0
(Japan) Minatsu Mitani	1	1	0	+1
(Japan) Nozomi Okuhara	2	0	2	–2
(Japan) Sayaka Sato	2	0	2	–2
(South Korea) Bae Yeon-ju	3	0	3	–3
(South Korea) Sung Ji-hyun	5	0	5	–5
(Thailand) Busanan Ongbamrungphan	4	3	1	+2
(Thailand) Ratchanok Intanon	6	0	6	–6
(Chinese Taipei) Tai Tzu-ying	1	0	1	–1

Women's doubles, with Yulia Yosephine Susanto

Player	M	W	L	Diff.
(Indonesia) Greysia Polii & Apriyani Rahayu	1	0	1	–1
