= 2013 Asian Junior Badminton Championships – Girls singles =

Tournament details
- Dates: 10 – 14 July 2013
- Edition: 16
- Venue: Likas Indoor Stadium
- Location: Kota Kinabalu, Malaysia

The Girls' Singles tournament of the 2013 Asian Junior Badminton Championships was held from July 10–14 in Kota Kinabalu, Malaysia. The defending champion of the last edition was P. V. Sindhu from India. Busanan Ongbumrungpan, Hana Ramadhini, and Aya Ohori were the top 3 seeded this year. Ohori emerged as the champion after defeat Ongbumrungpan of Thailand in the finals with the score 21–11, 16–21, 21–13. It was the first time ever for Japan to win the gold medal in the girls' singles event.

== Seeded ==
1. (Thailand) Busanan Ongbumrungpan (final)
2. (Indonesia) Hana Ramadhini (third round)
3. (Japan) Aya Ohori (champion)
4. (South Korea) Kim Hyo-min (quarter-final)
5. (Singapore) Liang Xiaoyu (quarter-final)
6. (India) Ruthvika Shivani (quarter-final)
7. (Thailand) Sarita Suwannakitborihan (third round)
8. (Thailand) Pornpawee Chochuwong (third round)

== Draw ==
=== Finals ===
Quarterfinals
1	(Thailand) Busanan Ongbumrungpan	21	21
6	(India) Ruthvika Shivani	8	16
4	(South Korea) Kim Hyo-min	18	14
(China) He Bingjiao	21	21
5	(Singapore) Liang Xiaoyu	7	8
3	(Japan) Aya Ohori	21	21
(South Korea) Lee Min-ji	14	10
(China) Qin Jinjing	21	21

Semifinals
1	(Thailand) Busanan Ongbumrungpan	21	21
(China) He Bingjiao	16	17
3	(Japan) Aya Ohori	21	21
(China) Qin Jinjing	14	12

Final
1	(Thailand) Busanan Ongbumrungpan	11	21	13
3	(Japan) Aya Ohori	21	16	21

=== Top Half ===
==== Section 1 ====
First Round
1	(Thailand) B Ongbumrungpan
BYE
(Japan) C Hoshi	21	21
(Hong Kong) Tsang WC	14	10
(Sri Lanka) Y Dayarathne	11	11
(Chinese Taipei) Hsu W-c	21	21
(Vietnam) Tran TLG	22	11
(South Korea) Kim N-y	24	21

Second Round
1	(Thailand) B Ongbumrungpan	21	21
(Japan) C Hoshi	15	19
(Chinese Taipei) Hsu W-c	12	17
(South Korea) Kim N-y	21	21

Third Round
1	(Thailand) B Ongbumrungpan	21	24
(South Korea) Kim N-y	14	22

==== Section 2 ====
First Round
6	(India) R Shivani	21	21
(Macau) Wong SM	9	14
(Singapore) Yeo JM	21	21
(Uzbekistan) M Pakina	10	14
(Malaysia) Lee ZY	18	21	15
(Indonesia) Fitriani	21	15	21
(China) Wang XY	21	21
(Nepal) S Pradhan	4	11

Second Round
6	(India) R Shivani	10	21	21
(Singapore) Yeo JM	21	14	12
(Indonesia) Fitriani	21	11	17
(China) Wang XY	16	21	21

Third Round
6	(India) R Shivani	18	21	21
(China) Wang XY	21	18	16

==== Section 3 ====
First Round
4	(South Korea) Kim H-m
BYE
(Iran) S Aghaei	21	21
(Hong Kong) Yeung SY	19	8
(Indonesia) R Hartawan	21	21
SUB	(India) R Mukherjee	7	15
(Macau) Ng WC	5	8
(Malaysia) K Selvaduray	21	21

Second Round
4	(South Korea) Kim H-m	21	21
(Iran) S Aghaei	8	14
(Indonesia) R Hartawan	19	13
(Malaysia) K Selvaduray	21	21

Third Round
4	(South Korea) Kim H-m	21	23
(Malaysia) K Selvaduray	11	21

==== Section 4 ====
First Round
8	(Thailand) P Chochuwong	21	20	21
(Chinese Taipei) Yu C-h	19	22	14
(Uzbekistan) A Khurshudyan	18	16
(Sri Lanka) M Fonseka	21	21
(China) He BJ	21	21
(Kazakhstan) A Kassenova	5	6
(Malaysia) Yap RC	21	21
(Singapore) G Chua	11	17

Second Round
8	(Thailand) P Chochuwong	21	21
(Sri Lanka) M Fonseka	10	7
(China) He BJ	21	21
(Malaysia) Yap RC	15	11

Third Round
8	(Thailand) P Chochuwong	10	21	14
(China) He BJ	21	19	21

=== Bottom Half ===
==== Section 5 ====
First Round
(Indonesia) I Jayanti	17	21	21
(Malaysia) S Kumares	21	10	14
(Macau) Kuan CL	6	6
(China) Chen YF	21	21
(Nepal) S Shrestha	14	15
(Sri Lanka) M Beruwalage	21	21
(South Korea) Jun J-i	18	12
5	(Singapore) Liang XY	21	21

Second Round
(Indonesia) I Jayanti	16	19
(China) Chen YF	21	21
(Sri Lanka) M Beruwalage	4	9
5	(Singapore) Liang XY	21	21

Third Round
(China) Chen YF	18	12
5	(Singapore) Liang XY	21	21

==== Section 6 ====
First Round
(India) R Karthik	21	11	21
(Thailand) A Sapniti	13	21	19
(Malaysia) Lee YY	17	23	21
(Vietnam) Nguyen TL	21	21	12
(Chinese Taipei) Lee C-h	13	21	21
(Hong Kong) Ng WY	21	10	11
BYE
3	(Japan) A Ohori

Second Round
(India) R Karthik	15	21	19
(Malaysia) Lee YY	21	18	21
(Chinese Taipei) Lee C-h	17	19
3	(Japan) A Ohori	21	21

Third Round
(Malaysia) Lee YY	9	9
3	(Japan) A Ohori	21	21

==== Section 7 ====
First Round
(Malaysia) Ho YM	19	17
(South Korea) Lee M-j	21	21
(Bhutan) P Thingh	7	3
(Iran) Y Beigi	21	21
(Sri Lanka) K Sirimannage	16	14
(India) S Pardeshi	21	21
(Macau) Wong KI	6	10
7	(Thailand) S Suwannakitborihan	21	21

Second Round
(South Korea) Lee M-j	21	21
(Iran) Y Beigi	8	8
(India) S Pardeshi	11	11
7	(Thailand) S Suwannakitborihan	21	21

Third Round
(South Korea) Lee M-j	12	21	21
7	(Thailand) S Suwannakitborihan	21	15	12

==== Section 8 ====
First Round
(Japan) A Sakuramoto	21	21
(Kazakhstan) N Ismailova	8	13
(Hong Kong) Ng TY	8	14
(China) Qin JJ	21	21
(Singapore) Tan AN	21	21
(Uzbekistan) V Mushtakova	10	4
BYE
2	(Indonesia) H Ramadini

Second Round
(Japan) A Sakuramoto	8	21	14
(China) Qin JJ	21	14	21
(Singapore) Tan AN	10	14
2	(Indonesia) H Ramadini	21	21

Third Round
(China) Qin JJ	18	21	21
2	(Indonesia) H Ramadini	21	13	18
