= Hanna Ramadini =

Indonesian badminton player (born 1995)

Personal information
- Born: 21 February 1995 (age 31) Tasikmalaya, West Java, Indonesia
- Height: 1.62 m (5 ft 4 in)
- Weight: 55 kg (121 lb)

Sport
- Country: Indonesia
- Sport: Badminton
- Handedness: Right

Women's singles
- Highest ranking: 32 (9 March 2017)
- BWF profile
Medal record
Women's badminton
Representing Indonesia
Sudirman Cup
Bronze medal – third place	2015 Dongguan	Mixed team
Asia Team Championships
Bronze medal – third place	2018 Alor Setar	Women's team
SEA Games
Silver medal – second place	2015 Singapore	Women's singles
Bronze medal – third place	2015 Singapore	Women's team
Bronze medal – third place	2017 Kuala Lumpur	Women's team
World Junior Championships
Silver medal – second place	2013 Bangkok	Mixed team
Asian Junior Championships
Bronze medal – third place	2013 Kota Kinabalu	Mixed team

Hanna Ramadini (born 21 February 1995) is an Indonesian badminton player affiliated with Mutiara Cardinal Bandung club. She married another badminton player, Arya Maulana Aldiartama.

== Achievements ==
=== SEA Games ===
Women's singles
Year	Venue	Opponent	Score	Result	Ref.
2015	Singapore Indoor Stadium, Singapore	(Thailand) Busanan Ongbamrungphan	17–21, 12–21	Silver	

=== BWF International Challenge/Series (2 titles, 2 runners-up) ===
Women's singles
Year	Tournament	Opponent	Score	Result	Ref.
2013	Vietnam International	(Thailand) Pornpawee Chochuwong	21–14, 21–19	(gold) Winner	
2013	Maldives International	(Canada) Michelle Li	8–21, 13–21	(silver) Runner-up	
2014	Swiss International	(Indonesia) Dinar Dyah Ayustine	11–9, 11–5, 7–11, 9–11, 11–6	(gold) Winner	
2016	Indonesia International	(Indonesia) Fitriani	19–21, 18–21	(silver) Runner-up	

BWF International Challenge tournament
BWF International Series tournament

=== BWF Junior International (1 title, 1 runner-up) ===
Girls' singles
Year	Tournament	Opponent	Score	Result	Ref.
2011	Singapore Youth International	(Indonesia) Melvira Oklamona	21–8, 21–16	(gold) Winner	
2012	Indonesia Junior International	(Indonesia) Setyana Mapasa	16–21, 21–19, 19–21	(silver) Runner-up	

BWF Junior International Grand Prix tournament
BWF Junior International Challenge tournament
BWF Junior International Series tournament
BWF Junior Future Series tournament

== Participation at Indonesian team ==
- 1 time at Uber Cup (2016)
- 1 time at Badminton Asia Team Championships (2016)
- 1 time at SEA Games (2015)

== Performance timeline ==
=== Indonesian team ===
- Junior level

Team events	2011	2012	2013
Asian Junior Championships	A	QF	Bronze
World Junior Championships	QF	4th	Silver

- Senior level

Team events	2014	2015	2016	2017	2018
SEA Games	NH	Bronze	NH	Bronze	NH
Asian Games	QF	NH			A
Asian Championships	NH		QF	NH	Bronze
Asia Mixed Team Championships	NH			QF	NH
Uber Cup	A	NH	QF	NH	A
Sudirman Cup	NH	Bronze	NH	A	NH

=== Individual competitions ===
- Junior level

Event	2012	2013
Asian Junior Championships	R3	R3

Event	2011	2012	2013
World Junior Championships	R2	QF	QF

- Senior level

Event	2015
SEA Games	Silver

Event	2016	2018
Asian Championships	R1	R1

Tournament	BWF World Tour	Best
Tournament	2018	Best
Malaysia Masters	R1	R2 (2015, 2016, 2017)
Indonesia Masters	R1	QF (2013, 2016)
Indonesia Masters Super 100	R1	R1 (2018)

Tournament	BWF Superseries					Best
Tournament	2013	2014	2015	2016	2017	Best
All England Open	A					
India Open	A		QF	A		QF (2015)
Malaysia Open	A					
Singapore Open	A		Q2	A		
Australian Open	GPG	A				
Indonesia Open	R1	Q2	Q1	R1		R1 (2013, 2016)
Japan Open	A					
Korea Open	A					
Denmark Open	A					
French Open	A					
China Open	A					
Hong Kong Open	A					
Tournament	BWF Grand Prix and Grand Prix Gold					Best
Tournament	2013	2014	2015	2016	2017	Best
Malaysia Masters	A		R2	R2	R2	R2 (2015, 2016, 2017)
Syed Modi International	—N/a	A		R2	SF	SF (2017)
Thailand Masters	—N/a	—N/a	—N/a	A		
German Open	A					
Swiss Open	A					
China Masters	SS	A				
New Zealand Open	A					
U.S. Open	A					
Canada Open	A					
Chinese Taipei Open	A	Q2	Q3	R2		R2
Russian Open	A					
Vietnam Open	A	R1	QF	R1		QF (2015)
Thailand Open	A	—N/a	R1	R1		R1 (2015, 2016)
Dutch Open	A	QF	A			QF (2014)
Chinese Taipei Masters	—N/a	—N/a	A	QF		QF (2016)
Macau Open	A	Q1	R1	A		R1 (2015)
Indonesian Masters	QF	A	R2	QF	—N/a	QF (2013, 2016)

== Record against selected opponents ==
Head to head (H2H) against World Superseries finalists, World Championships semifinalists, and Olympic quarterfinalists:

- (China) Sun Yu 0–3
- (India) Saina Nehwal 0–3
- (Japan) Akane Yamaguchi 0–2
- (Japan) Nozomi Okuhara 0–3
- (Japan) Sayaka Sato 1–1
- (Japan) Yui Hashimoto 0–1
- (South Korea) Bae Yeon-ju 0–1
- (South Korea) Sung Ji-hyun 0–4
- (Thailand) Ratchanok Intanon 0–1
- (United States) Beiwen Zhang 0–2
