= Busanan Ongbamrungphan =

Thai badminton player (born 1996)

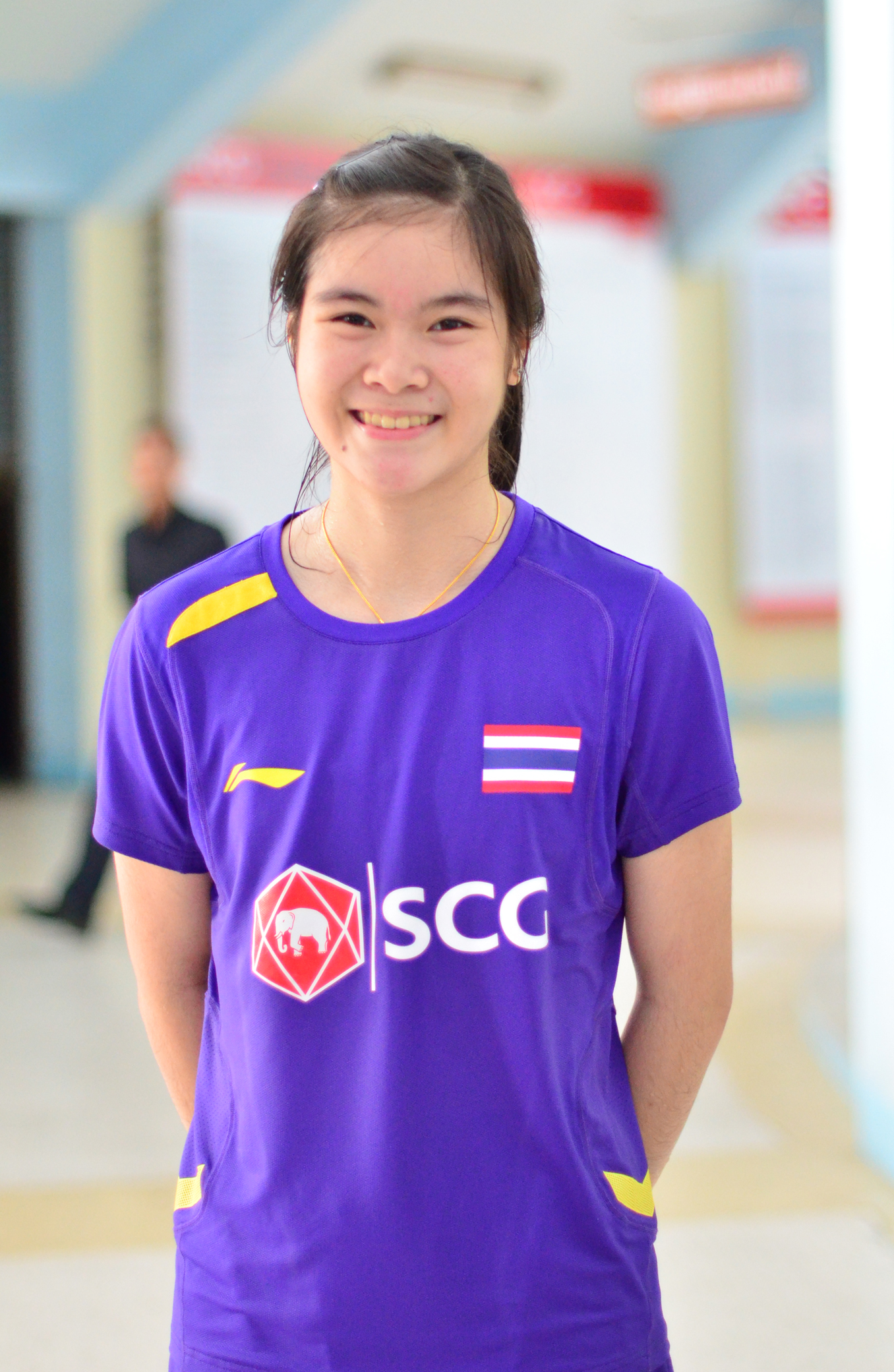
- Busanan in June 2013

Personal information
- Nickname: Cream
- Born: 22 March 1996 (age 30) Nonthaburi, Thailand
- Height: 1.68 m (5 ft 6 in)

Sport
- Country: Thailand
- Sport: Badminton
- Handedness: Right

Women's singles
- Highest ranking: 9 (14 January 2025)
- Current ranking: 31 (3 November 2026)
- BWF profile
Medal record
Women's badminton
Representing Thailand
Sudirman Cup
Bronze medal – third place	2017 Gold Coast	Mixed team
Bronze medal – third place	2019 Nanning	Mixed team
Uber Cup
Silver medal – second place	2018 Bangkok	Women's team
Bronze medal – third place	2020 Aarhus	Women's team
Bronze medal – third place	2022 Bangkok	Women's team
Asian Games
Bronze medal – third place	2018 Jakarta–Palembang	Women's team
Bronze medal – third place	2022 Hangzhou	Women's team
Asia Mixed Team Championships
Bronze medal – third place	2017 Ho Chi Minh	Mixed team
Bronze medal – third place	2023 Dubai	Mixed team
Bronze medal – third place	2025 Qingdao	Mixed team
Asia Team Championships
Silver medal – second place	2024 Selangor	Women's team
Bronze medal – third place	2016 Hyderabad	Women's team
Bronze medal – third place	2020 Manila	Women's team
SEA Games
Gold medal – first place	2015 Singapore	Women's singles
Gold medal – first place	2015 Singapore	Women's team
Gold medal – first place	2017 Kuala Lumpur	Women's team
Gold medal – first place	2019 Philippines	Women's team
Gold medal – first place	2025 Thailand	Women's team
Silver medal – second place	2013 Naypyidaw	Women's singles
Summer Universiade
Bronze medal – third place	2015 Gwangju	Mixed team
Youth Olympic Games
Bronze medal – third place	2014 Nanjing	Girls' singles
World Junior Championships
Bronze medal – third place	2013 Bangkok	Girls' singles
Bronze medal – third place	2014 Alor Setar	Mixed team
Asian Youth Games
Silver medal – second place	2013 Nanjing	Girls' singles
Asian Junior Championship
Silver medal – second place	2013 Kota Kinabalu	Girls' singles
Bronze medal – third place	2012 Gimcheon	Girls' singles
Bronze medal – third place	2014 Taipei	Girls' singles

Busanan Ongbamrungphan (Thai: บุศนันท์ อึ๊งบำรุงพันธ์; born 22 March 1996) is a Thai badminton player who specializes in singles. She was the women's singles gold medalists at the 2015 SEA Games, and also won the women's team title at the Games in 2015, 2017 and 2019. Busanan competed at the 2014 and 2018 Asian Games as well as the 2020 Summer Olympics.

== Achievements ==
=== SEA Games ===
Women's singles
Year	Venue	Opponent	Score	Result
2013	Wunna Theikdi Indoor Stadium, Naypyidaw, Myanmar	(Indonesia) Bellaetrix Manuputty	21–9, 13–21, 13–21	Silver
2015	Singapore Indoor Stadium, Singapore	(Indonesia) Hanna Ramadini	21–17, 21–12	Gold

=== Youth Olympic Games ===
Girls' singles
Year	Venue	Opponent	Score	Result
2014	Nanjing Sport Institute, Nanjing, China	(Chinese Taipei) Lee Chia-hsin	21–7, 21–12	Bronze

=== BWF World Junior Championships ===
Girls' singles
Year	Venue	Opponent	Score	Result
2013	Hua Mark Indoor Stadium, Bangkok, Thailand	(Japan) Akane Yamaguchi	11–21, 19–21	Bronze

=== Asian Youth Games ===
Girls' singles
Year	Venue	Opponent	Score	Result
2013	Nanjing Sport Institute, Nanjing, China	(China) Qin Jinjing	21–19, 17–21, 16–21	Silver

=== Asian Junior Championships ===
Girls' singles
Year	Venue	Opponent	Score	Result
2012	Gimcheon Indoor Stadium, Gimcheon, South Korea	(India) P. V. Sindhu	19–21, 16–21	Bronze
2013	Likas Indoor Stadium, Kota Kinabalu, Malaysia	(Japan) Aya Ohori	11–21, 21–16, 13–21	Silver
2014	Taipei Gymnasium, Taipei, Taiwan	(Japan) Akane Yamaguchi	21–16, 8–21, 14–21	Bronze

=== BWF World Tour (4 titles, 4 runners-up) ===
The BWF World Tour, which was announced on 19 March 2017 and implemented in 2018, is a series of elite badminton tournaments, sanctioned by Badminton World Federation (BWF). The BWF World Tour is divided into six levels, namely World Tour Finals, Super 1000, Super 750, Super 500, Super 300 (part of the BWF World Tour), and the BWF Tour Super 100.

Women's singles
Year	Tournament	Level	Opponent	Score	Result
2019	Thailand Masters	Super 300	(Indonesia) Fitriani	12–21, 14–21	(silver) Runner-up
2021	Orléans Masters	Super 100	(Denmark) Line Christophersen	16–21, 21–15, 21–19	(gold) Winner
2021	Hylo Open	Super 500	(Singapore) Yeo Jia Min	21–10, 21–14	(gold) Winner
2022	India Open	Super 500	(Thailand) Supanida Katethong	22–20, 19–21, 21–13	(gold) Winner
2022	Swiss Open	Super 300	(India) P. V. Sindhu	16–21, 8–21	(silver) Runner-up
2024	Canada Open	Super 500	(Denmark) Line Kjærsfeldt	21–18, 21–14	(gold) Winner
2024	Japan Open	Super 750	(Japan) Akane Yamaguchi	11–21, 10–21	(silver) Runner-up
2025	Arctic Open	Super 500	(Japan) Akane Yamaguchi	19–21, 16–21	(silver) Runner-up

=== BWF Grand Prix (4 titles, 6 runners-up) ===
The BWF Grand Prix had two levels, the Grand Prix and Grand Prix Gold. It was a series of badminton tournaments sanctioned by the Badminton World Federation (BWF) and played between 2007 and 2017.

Women's singles
Year	Tournament	Opponent	Score	Result
2012	Malaysia Grand Prix Gold	(Japan) Sayaka Takahashi	21–17, 22–20	(gold) Winner
2012	Macau Open	(China) Sun Yu	19–21, 8–21	(silver) Runner-up
2013	Thailand Open	(Thailand) Ratchanok Intanon	22–20, 19–21, 13–21	(silver) Runner-up
2013	Dutch Open	(Singapore) Gu Juan	21–12, 21–12	(gold) Winner
2015	Swiss Open	(China) Sun Yu	16–21, 12–21	(silver) Runner-up
2015	Bitburger Open	(Japan) Akane Yamaguchi	21–16, 14–21, 13–21	(silver) Runner-up
2016	Indonesian Masters	(Malaysia) Goh Jin Wei	21–15, 21–13	(gold) Winner
2016	Thailand Open	(Japan) Aya Ohori	23–25, 8–21	(silver) Runner-up
2017	Thailand Masters	(Japan) Aya Ohori	21–18, 21–16	(gold) Winner
2017	Thailand Open	(Thailand) Ratchanok Intanon	18–21, 21–12, 16–21	(silver) Runner-up

BWF Grand Prix Gold tournament
BWF Grand Prix tournament

== Performance timeline ==
Key

W	Won	F	Finalist	SF	Semi-finalist
QF	Quarter-finalist	#R	Rounds 4, 3, 2, 1	RR	Round-robin stage
Q#	Qualification round	A	Absent	w/d	Withdrew
G	Gold	S	Silver	B	Bronze
NH	Not held	N/A	Not applicable	DNQ	Did not qualify

=== National team ===
- Junior level

Team events	2012	2013	2014
Asian Junior Championships	QF	QF	QF
World Junior Championships	QF	QF	B

- Senior level

Team events	2014	2015	2016	2017	2018	2019	2020	2021	2022	2023	2024	2025	2026
SEA Games	NH	G	NH	G	NH	G	NH	A	NH	A	NH	G	NH
Asia Team Championships	NH		B	NH	QF	NH	B	NH	A	NH	S	NH	QF
Asia Mixed Team Championships	NH			B	NH	A	NH			B	NH	B	NH
Asian Games	QF	NH			B	NH			B	NH			
Uber Cup	QF	NH	QF	NH	S	NH	B	NH	B	NH	QF	NH	QF
Sudirman Cup	NH	GS	NH	B	NH	B	NH	QF	NH	A	NH	A	NH

=== Individual competitions ===
- Junior level

Events	2012	2013	2014
Asian Youth Games	NH	S	NH
Asian Junior Championships	B	S	B
World Junior Championships	QF	B	QF
Youth Olympic Games	NH		B

- Senior level

Events	2013	2014	2015	2016	2017	2018	2019	2020	2021	2022	2023	2024	2025	2026
SEA Games	S	NH	G	NH	QF	NH	A	NH	A	NH	A	NH	A	NH
Asian Championships	2R	A		1R	1R	2R	1R	NH		1R	A	2R	2R	2R
Asian Games	NH	A	NH			A	NH			QF	NH			
World Championships	2R	w/d	3R	NH	DNQ	2R	2R	NH	2R	QF	3R	NH	3R	1R
Olympic Games	NH			DNQ	NH			1R	NH			DNQ	NH	

Tournament	BWF Superseries / Grand Prix								BWF World Tour								Best
Tournament	2011	2012	2013	2014	2015	2016	2017	2018	2019	2020	2021	2022	2023	2024	2025	2026	Best
Malaysia Open	A		1R	1R	1R	1R	2R	A	2R	NH		2R	2R	2R	w/d	2R	2R ('17, '19, '22, '23, '24, '26)
India Open	A		2R	A		2R	1R	A	QF	NH		W	2R	QF	w/d	2R	W ('22)
Indonesia Masters	A					W	NH	1R	2R	2R	1R	QF	2R	2R	A	1R	W ('16)
Thailand Masters	NH					SF	W	w/d	F	2R	NH		w/d	SF	A		W ('17)
German Open	A		1R	QF	2R	2R	2R	A	2R	NH		1R	A			2R	QF ('14)
All England Open	A		1R	1R	2R	2R	1R	2R	1R	2R	QF	2R	2R	2R	1R	1R	QF ('21)
Swiss Open	A		2R	A	F	QF	A			NH	QF	F	A	1R	A	2R	F ('15, '22)
Orléans Masters	N/A							A		NH	W	A	w/d	A			W ('21)
Thailand Open	2R	2R	F	NH	2R	F	F	2R	1R	QF	NH	1R	A	2R	QF	2R	F ('13, '16, '17)
Thailand Open	2R	2R	F	NH	2R	F	F	2R	1R	1R	NH	1R	A	2R	QF	2R	F ('13, '16, '17)
Malaysia Masters	A	W	SF	A		QF	A	1R	2R	1R	NH	1R	QF	SF	w/d	1R	W ('12)
Singapore Open	A	2R	1R	A	1R	1R	1R	2R	2R	NH		1R	A	2R	1R	1R	2R ('12, '18, '19, '24)
Indonesia Open	A	1R	2R	QF	2R	A	2R	2R	2R	NH	2R	2R	A		1R	1R	QF ('14)
Australian Open	A			1R	2R	A			QF	NH		w/d	A		2R	A	QF ('19)
Macau Open	A	F	A	SF	A				QF	NH				QF	QF	QF	F ('12)
U.S. Open	A							QF	A	NH			w/d	QF	A		QF ('18, '24)
Canada Open	A									NH		A	1R	W	A		W ('24)
Japan Open	A	2R	1R	2R	1R	1R	1R	A	QF	NH		1R	A	F	1R	1R	F ('24)
China Open	A	2R	2R	1R	1R	A		2R	QF	NH			1R	2R	2R	2R	QF ('19)
Taipei Open	A		SF	A	1R	2R	A		w/d	NH		A	w/d	A			SF ('13)
Korea Masters	A						1R	2R	2R	NH		w/d	A				2R ('18, '19)
China Masters	A	QF	1R	A		QF	A	2R	QF	NH			1R	1R	1R		QF ('12, '16, '19)
Vietnam Open	Q1	SF	A		2R	A				NH		A					SF ('12)
Hong Kong Open	A	2R	A	1R	1R	1R	2R	1R	QF	NH			1R	QF	1R		QF ('19, '24)
Korea Open	A		1R	1R	2R	A	1R	A	1R	NH		QF	A	2R	A		QF ('22)
Arctic Open	NH	N/A								NH			2R	A	F		F ('25)
Denmark Open	A			2R	1R	2R	2R	2R	1R	A	2R	1R	2R	1R	2R		2R ('14, '16, '17, '18, '21, '23, '25)
French Open	A			1R	1R	QF	2R	1R	1R	NH	QF	QF	2R	2R	1R		QF ('16, '21, '22)
Hylo Open	A				F	SF	1R	A			W	2R	A				W ('21)
Japan Masters	NH												1R	1R	1R		1R ('23, '24, '25)
Syed Modi International	Q1	A	NH	A		QF	A			NH		A					QF ('16)
Superseries / World Tour Finals	DNQ								RR	DNQ	RR	RR	DNQ	RR	DNQ		RR ('19, '21, '22, '24)
Dutch Open	A		W	A						NH	NA						W ('13)
London Grand Prix	NH		SF	NH													SF ('13)
Mexico City Grand Prix	NH				3R	NH											3R ('15)
Spain Masters	NH							QF	A	SF	A	NH	w/d	A	NH		SF ('20)
Year-end ranking	190	17	17	22	19	13	17	29	15	12	12	11	19	11	19		9 (14 January 2025)
Tournament	2011	2012	2013	2014	2015	2016	2017	2018	2019	2020	2021	2022	2023	2024	2025	2026	Best

== Record against selected opponents ==
Record against Year-end Finals finalists, World Championships semi-finalists, and Olympic quarter-finalists.
Accurate as of 15 November 2024.

Players	Matches	Results		Difference
Players	Matches	Won	Lost	Difference
(Bulgaria) Petya Nedelcheva	2	1	1	0
(China) Chen Yufei	15	3	12	–9
(China) He Bingjiao	11	1	10	–9
(China) Li Xuerui	8	2	6	–4
(China) Wang Shixian	7	1	6	–5
(China) Wang Yihan	6	1	5	–4
(Chinese Taipei) Tai Tzu-ying	21	4	17	–13
(Denmark) Tine Baun	2	0	2	–2
(Germany) Juliane Schenk	1	0	1	–1
(Hong Kong) Yip Pui Yin	5	5	0	+5
(India) Saina Nehwal	9	6	3	+3

Players	Matches	Results		Difference
Players	Matches	Won	Lost	Difference
(India) Pusarla Venkata Sindhu	21	1	20	–19
(Indonesia) Lindaweni Fanetri	1	1	0	+1
(Indonesia) Gregoria Mariska Tunjung Cahyaningsih	10	3	7	–4
(Japan) Minatsu Mitani	4	2	2	0
(Japan) Aya Ohori	16	7	9	–2
(Japan) Nozomi Okuhara	9	2	7	–5
(Japan) Akane Yamaguchi	13	2	11	–9
(South Korea) An Se-young	7	0	7	–7
(South Korea) Bae Yeon-ju	5	3	2	+1
(South Korea) Sung Ji-hyun	10	2	8	–6
(Spain) Carolina Marín	8	0	8	–8
(Thailand) Porntip Buranaprasertsuk	3	1	2	–1
(Thailand) Ratchanok Intanon May	13	1	12	–11

== Personal life ==
She is interested in Lego as a hobby.
