= Badminton at the 2022 Asian Games – Women's singles =

Women's singles at the 2022 Asian Games
- Venue: Binjiang Gymnasium
- Dates: 2–7 October 2023

Medalists
gold medal	An Se-young	South Korea
silver medal	Chen Yufei	China
bronze medal	He Bingjiao	China
bronze medal	Aya Ohori	Japan

The badminton women's singles tournament at the 2022 Asian Games in Hangzhou took place from 2 to 7 October 2023 at Binjiang Gymnasium.

== Schedule ==
All times are China Standard Time (UTC+08:00)

Date	Time	Event
Monday, 2 October 2023	12:40	Round of 64
Tuesday, 3 October 2023	10:00	Round of 32
Wednesday, 4 October 2023	10:00	Round of 16
Thursday, 5 October 2023	9:00	Quarter-Finals
Friday, 6 October 2023	9:00	Semi-Finals
Saturday, 7 October 2023	20:20	Gold medal match

== Results ==
=== Seeds ===
1. An Se-young (KOR) (champion)
2. Chen Yufei (CHN) (final)
3. Tai Tzu-ying (TPE) (third round)
4. He Bingjiao (CHN) (semi-finals)
5. Gregoria Mariska Tunjung (INA) (quarter-finals)
6. Pornpawee Chochuwong (THA) (third round)
7. P. V. Sindhu (IND) (quarter-finals)
8. Busanan Ongbamrungphan (THA) (quarter-finals)

=== Finals ===
Semi-finals
1	An Se-young (KOR)	21	21
4	He Bingjiao (CHN)	10	13
Aya Ohori (JPN)	21	10	8
2	Chen Yufei (CHN)	18	21	21

Final
1	An Se-young (KOR)	21	17	21
2	Chen Yufei (CHN)	18	21	8

=== Top half ===
==== Section 1 ====
First round

Second round
1	An S-y (KOR)	21	21
Pui C W (MAC)	9	5
F N Abdul Razzaq (MDV)	20	21	21
Y Kermani (IRI)	22	13	17
8	B Ongbamrungphan (THA)	21	21
L Karupathevan (MAS)	13	10
M Shahzad (PAK)	7	10
Nguyễn T L (VIE)	21	21

Third round
1	An S-y (KOR)	21	21
F N Abdul Razzaq (MDV)	4	5
8	B Ongbamrungphan (THA)	21	21
Nguyễn T L (VIE)	19	17

Quarter-finals
1	An S-y (KOR)	21	21
8	B Ongbamrungphan (THA)	12	13

==== Section 2 ====
First round

Second round
4	He BJ (CHN)	21	17	21
N Nidaira (JPN)	17	21	14
R Maharjan (NEP)	21	21
G Myagmartseren (MGL)	4	7
7	P. V. Sindhu (IND)	21	21
Hsu W-c (TPE)	10	15
Liang K W (HKG)	11	10
P K Wardani (INA)	21	21

Third round
4	He BJ (CHN)	21	21
R Maharjan (NEP)	10	4
7	P. V. Sindhu (IND)	21	21
P K Wardani (INA)	16	16

Quarter-finals
4	He BJ (CHN)	21	21
7	P. V. Sindhu (IND)	16	12

=== Bottom half ===
==== Section 3 ====
First round
G Siddique (PAK)	10	4
Goh J W (MAS)	21	21

Second round
Goh J W (MAS)	21	21
Vũ T A T (VIE)	10	13
A Chaliha (IND)	17	16
5	G M Tunjung (INA)	21	21
H Lo (HKG)	13	14
A Ohori (JPN)	21	21
A Munkhtsetseg (MGL)	2	2
3	Tai T-y (TPE)	21	21

Third round
Goh J W (MAS)	6	12
5	G M Tunjung (INA)	21	21
A Ohori (JPN)	21	21
3	Tai T-y (TPE)	16	14

Quarter-finals
5	G M Tunjung (INA)	10	19
A Ohori (JPN)	21	21

==== Section 4 ====
First round

Second round
A N Abdul Razzaq (MDV)	1	2
Kim Ga-eun (KOR)	21	21
A Maya Rai (NEP)	10	4
6	P Chochuwong (THA)	21	21
K Smagulova (KAZ)	7	7
Yeo J M (SGP)	21	21
Z de Jesus (TLS)	1	1
2	Chen YF (CHN)	21	21

Third round
Kim Ga-eun (KOR)	21	21
6	P Chochuwong (THA)	13	9
Yeo J M (SGP)	21	7	9
2	Chen YF (CHN)	19	21	21

Quarter-finals
Kim Ga-eun (KOR)	17	21	15
2	Chen YF (CHN)	21	17	21
