= Badminton at the 2015 SEA Games – Women's singles =

Badminton – Women's singles at the 2015 SEA Games
- Venue: Singapore Indoor Stadium
- Dates: 13–16 June 2015
- Competitors: 12 from 6 nations

Medalists
gold medal	Busanan Ongbamrungphan	Thailand
silver medal	Hanna Ramadini	Indonesia
bronze medal	Goh Jin Wei	Malaysia
bronze medal	Vũ Thị Trang	Vietnam

The women's singles competition in badminton at the 2015 SEA Games is being held from 13 to 16 June 2015 at the Singapore Indoor Stadium in Kallang, Singapore.

== Schedule ==
All times are Singapore Standard Time (UTC+08:00)

Date	Time	Event
Saturday, 13 June 2015	14:30	Round of 16
Sunday, 14 June 2015	14:45	Quarter-final
Monday, 15 June 2015	14:50	Semi-final
Tuesday, 16 June 2015	09:50	Gold medal match

== Results ==
Source: Results Summary

Round of 16; 13 June 14:30
Lin Khaing Zar (MYA)	8	6
Tee Jing Yi (MAS)	21	21
Grace Chua (SIN)	11	19
Lindaweni Fanetri (INA)	21	21
Liang Xiaoyu (SIN)	21	21
Yee Le Le (MYA)	4	5
Nguyễn Thùy Linh (VIE)	20	15
Goh Jin Wei (MAS)	22	21

Quarterfinal; 14 June 14:45
Busanan Ongbamrungphan (THA)	21	21
Tee (MAS)	13	13
Vũ Thị Trang (VIE)	21	9	21
Fanetri (INA)	19	21	17
Liang (SIN)	15	21	14
Hanna Ramadini (INA)	21	11	21
Goh (MAS)	21	23
Nitchaon Jindapol (THA)	16	21

Semifinal; 15 June 14:50
Ongbamrungphan (THA)	21	21
Vũ (VIE)	11	17
Ramadini (INA)	16	21	21
Goh (MAS)	21	12	18

Gold medal match 16 June 09:50
Ongbamrungphan (THA)	21	21
Ramadini (INA)	17	12

== Final standing ==
Rank	Athlete
1st place, gold medalist(s)	Busanan Ongbamrungphan (THA)
2nd place, silver medalist(s)	Hanna Ramadini (INA)
3rd place, bronze medalist(s)	Goh Jin Wei (MAS)
3rd place, bronze medalist(s)	Vũ Thị Trang (VIE)
5-8	Lindaweni Fanetri (INA)
5-8	Liang Xiaoyu (SIN)
5-8	Nitchaon Jindapol (THA)
5-8	Tee Jing Yi (MAS)
9-12	Nguyễn Thùy Linh (VIE)
9-12	Grace Chua (SIN)
9-12	Lin Khaing Zar (MYA)
9-12	Yee Le Le (MYA)
