= Badminton at the 2019 SEA Games – Women's team =

Badminton – Women's team at the 2019 SEA Games
- Venue: Muntinlupa Sports Complex
- Dates: 1–3 December
- Nations: 7

Medalists
| gold medal | Thailand (THA) |
| silver medal | Indonesia (INA) |
| bronze medal | Malaysia (MAS) |
| bronze medal | Singapore (SGP) |

The badminton women's team tournament at the 2019 SEA Games in Manila will be held from 1 to 3 December at the Muntinlupa Sports Complex, Metro Manila, Philippines.

== Schedule ==
All times are Philippines Standard Time (UTC+08:00)

| Date | Time | Event |
|---|---|---|
| Sunday, 1 December | 09:00 | Quarter-finals |
| Monday, 2 December | 09:00 | Semi-finals |
| Tuesday, 3 December | 10:00 | Final |

== Results ==
Quarter-finals
Malaysia (MAS) | w/o
Cambodia (CAM)
Philippines (PHI) | 2
Singapore (SGP) | 3
Vietnam (VIE) | 1
Indonesia (INA) | 3

Semi-finals
Thailand (THA) | 3
Malaysia (MAS) | 0
Singapore (SGP) | 1
Indonesia (INA) | 3

Final
Thailand (THA) | 3
Indonesia (INA) | 1

=== Quarter-finals ===
| 1 December | Philippines (PHI) | 2–3 | Singapore (SGP) |

| Bianca Carlos | 2–1 | Yeo Jia Min | 11–21, 21-19, 21–14 |
| Alyssa Leonardo / Thea Pomar | 2–0 | Jin Yujia / Insyirah Khan | 21–16, 21–12 |
| Sarah Barredo | 0–2 | Jaslyn Hooi | 13–21, 15–21 |
| Geva De Vera / Chanelle Lunod | 0–2 | Shinta Mulia Sari / Crystal Wong | 10–21, 15–21 |
| Mikaela De Guzman | 0–2 | Grace Chua | 10–21, 11–21 |

| 1 December | Vietnam (VIE) | 1–3 | Indonesia (INA) |

| Nguyễn Thùy Linh | 0–2 | Gregoria Mariska Tunjung | 14–21, 20–22 |
| Vũ Thị Trang | 2–1 | Fitriani | 21–14, 14–21, 21–14 |
| Đinh Thị Phượng Hồng / Phạm Thị Khánh | 1–2 | Ni Ketut Mahadewi Istarani / Apriyani Rahayu | 8–21, 22–20, 10–21 |
| Trần Thị Phương Thúy | 0–2 | Ruselli Hartawan | 15–21, 10–21 |
| Phạm Như Thảo / Vũ Thị Trang | | Siti Fadia Silva Ramadhanti / Ribka Sugiarto | not played |

=== Semi-finals ===
| 2 December | Thailand (THA) | 3–0 | Malaysia (MAS) |

| Ratchanok Intanon | 2–0 | Soniia Cheah Su Ya | 21–17, 21–14 |
| Rawinda Prajongjai / Puttita Supajirakul | 2–0 | Chow Mei Kuan / Lee Meng Yean | 24–22, 21–18 |
| Busanan Ongbamrungphan | 2–1 | Kisona Selvaduray | 15–21, 21–11, 21–12 |
| Chayanit Chaladchalam / Phataimas Muenwong | | Vivian Hoo / Yap Cheng Wen | not played |
| Pornpawee Chochuwong | | Eoon Qi Xuan | not played |

| 2 December | Singapore (SGP) | 1–3 | Indonesia (INA) |

| Yeo Jia Min | 0–2 | Gregoria Mariska Tunjung | 15–21, 21–23 |
| Jin Yujia / Insyirah Khan | 0–2 | Ni Ketut Mahadewi Istarani / Apriyani Rahayu | 8–21, 8–21 |
| Jaslyn Hooi | 2–1 | Fitriani | 13–21, 21–16, 21–16 |
| Shinta Mulia Sari / Crystal Wong | 0–2 | Siti Fadia Silva Ramadhanti / Ribka Sugiarto | 15–21, 19–21 |
| Grace Chua | | Ruselli Hartawan | not played |

=== Final ===
| 3 December | Thailand (THA) | 3–1 | Indonesia (INA) |

| Ratchanok Intanon | 2–1 | Gregoria Mariska Tunjung | 21–13, 12–21, 21–14 |
| Rawinda Prajongjai / Puttita Supajirakul | 0–2 | Ni Ketut Mahadewi Istarani / Apriyani Rahayu | 17–21, 18–21 |
| Busanan Ongbamrungphan | 2–0 | Fitriani | 21–8, 21–10 |
| Chayanit Chaladchalam / Phataimas Muenwong | 2–0 | Siti Fadia Silva Ramadhanti / Ribka Sugiarto | 21–8, 21–17 |
| Pornpawee Chochuwong | | Ruselli Hartawan | not played |

== See also ==
- Men's team tournament
- Individual event
