= 2014 BWF World Junior Championships – Team event knockout stage =

This article lists the complete results of the knock out stage of the 2014 BWF World Junior Championships – Teams event in Alor Setar, Malaysia.

== Bracket ==
Quarterfinals
W1	South Korea	0
W2	Thailand	3
X1	Indonesia	3
X2	Hong Kong	0
Y1	Japan	3
Y2	Chinese Taipei	2
Z1	China	3
Z2	Malaysia	1

Semifinals
W2	Thailand	2
X1	Indonesia	3
Y1	Japan	2
Z1	China	3

Final
X1	Indonesia	0
Z1	China	3

== Result ==
=== Quarter-finals ===
==== South Korea vs Thailand ====
South Korea
0
Stadium Sultan Abdul Halim Court 2
9 April 2014

Thailand
3

			1	2	3
1	(South Korea) (Thailand)	Kim Jung-ho / Kim Hye-jeong; Dechapol Puavaranukroh / Puttita Supajirakul	21; 19	15; 21	23; 25
2	(South Korea) (Thailand)	Seo Seung-jae; Kantaphon Wangcharoen	18; 21	18; 21
3	(South Korea) (Thailand)	Yoon Min-ah; Busanan Ongbumrungpan	7; 21	14; 21
4	(South Korea) (Thailand)	Kim Jae-hwan / Kim Jung-ho; Kittinupong Ketlen / Dechapol Puavaranukroh				not played
5	(South Korea) (Thailand)	Kim Hye-jeong / Kong Hee-yong; Busanan Ongbumrungpan / Puttita Supajirakul				not played

==== Indonesia vs Hong Kong ====
Indonesia
3
Stadium Sultan Abdul Halim Court 4
9 April 2014

Hong Kong
0

			1	2	3
1	(Indonesia) (Hong Kong)	Jonatan Christie; Lee Cheuk Yiu	19; 21	21; 11	22; 20
2	(Indonesia) (Hong Kong)	Ruselli Hartawan; Ng Tsz Yau	21; 13	22; 20
3	(Indonesia) (Hong Kong)	Muhammad Rian Ardianto / Clinton Hendrik Kudamassa; Yonny Chung / Yeung Shing Choi	21; 23	21; 15	21; 15
4	(Indonesia) (Hong Kong)	Rosyita Eka Putri Sari / Apriani Rahayu; Wu Yi Ting / Yeung Nga Ting				not played
5	(Indonesia) (Hong Kong)	Reinard Dhanriano / Rosyita Eka Putri Sari; Yeung Shing Choi / Ng Tsz Yau				not played

==== Japan vs Chinese Taipei ====
Japan
3
Stadium Sultan Abdul Halim Court 6
9 April 2014

Chinese Taipei
2

			1	2	3
1	(Japan) (Chinese Taipei)	Yuta Watanabe / Arisa Higashino; Lee Chia-han / Chang Ching-hui	21; 15	22; 20
2	(Japan) (Chinese Taipei)	Kanta Tsuneyama; Lai Yu-hua	21; 15	12; 21	15; 21
3	(Japan) (Chinese Taipei)	Kenya Mitsuhashi / Yuta Watanabe; Po Li-wei / Yang Ming-tse	21; 15	17; 21	21; 18
4	(Japan) (Chinese Taipei)	Akane Yamaguchi; Lee Chia-hsin	15; 21	11; 21
5	(Japan) (Chinese Taipei)	Wakana Nagahara / Chiharu Shida; Chang Ching-hui / Chang Hsin-tien	16; 21	21; 16	21; 10

==== China vs Malaysia ====
China
3
Stadium Sultan Abdul Halim Court 8
9 April 2014

Malaysia
1

			1	2	3
1	(China) (Malaysia)	Huang Kaixiang / Chen Qingchen; Tan Jinn Hwa / Goh Yea Ching	21; 8	21; 17
2	(China) (Malaysia)	Lin Guipu; Cheam June Wei	23; 21	14; 21	21; 23
3	(China) (Malaysia)	Huang Kaixiang / Zheng Siwei; Goh Sze Fei / Tan Jinn Hwa	21; 8	21; 12
4	(China) (Malaysia)	He Bingjiao; Kisona Selvaduray	16; 12			retired
5	(China) (Malaysia)	Jia Yifan / Qin Jinjing; Goh Yea Ching / Peck Yen Wei				not played

=== Semi-final ===
==== Thailand vs Indonesia ====
Thailand
2
Stadium Sultan Abdul Halim Court 1
10 April 2014

Indonesia
3

			1	2	3
1	(Thailand) (Indonesia)	Dechapol Puavaranukroh / Puttita Supajirakul; Muhammad Rian Ardianto / Rosyita Eka Putri Sari	19; 21	19; 21
2	(Thailand) (Indonesia)	Kantaphon Wangcharoen; Anthony Ginting	13; 21	7; 21
3	(Thailand) (Indonesia)	Busanan Ongbumrungpan; Ruselli Hartawan	21; 16	21; 13
4	(Thailand) (Indonesia)	Kittinupong Ketlen / Dechapol Puavaranukroh; Muhammad Rian Ardianto / Clinton Hendrik Kudamassa	21; 18	21; 11
5	(Thailand) (Indonesia)	Busanan Ongbumrungpan / Puttita Supajirakul; Rosyita Eka Putri Sari / Apriani Rahayu	9; 21	13; 21

==== Japan vs China ====
Japan
2
Stadium Sultan Abdul Halim Court 2
10 April 2014

China
3

			1	2	3
1	(Japan) (China)	Yuta Watanabe / Arisa Higashino; Huang Kaixiang / Chen Qingchen	19; 21	18; 21
2	(Japan) (China)	Kanta Tsuneyama; Lin Guipu	21; 11	21; 15
3	(Japan) (China)	Kenya Mitsuhashi / Yuta Watanabe; Huang Kaixiang / Zheng Siwei	18; 21	21; 17	14; 21
4	(Japan) (China)	Akane Yamaguchi; Qin Jinjing	21; 14	21; 17
5	(Japan) (China)	Wakana Nagahara / Chiharu Shida; Chen Qingchen / Jia Yifan	7; 21	10; 21

=== Final ===
==== Indonesia vs China ====
Indonesia
0
Stadium Sultan Abdul Halim Court 1
11 April 2014

China
3

			1	2	3
1	(Indonesia) (China)	Muhammad Rian Ardianto / Rosyita Eka Putri Sari; Huang Kaixiang / Chen Qingchen	14; 21	21; 17	17; 21
2	(Indonesia) (China)	Jonatan Christie; Shi Yuqi	19; 21	20; 22
3	(Indonesia) (China)	Muhammad Rian Ardianto / Clinton Hendrik Kudamassa; Huang Kaixiang / Zheng Siwei	22; 20	12; 21	18; 21
4	(Indonesia) (China)	Ruselli Hartawan; He Bingjiao				not played
5	(Indonesia) (China)	Rosyita Eka Putri Sari / Apriani Rahayu; Chen Qingchen / Jia Yifan				not played
