= Aya Ohori =

Japanese badminton player

Aya Ōhori
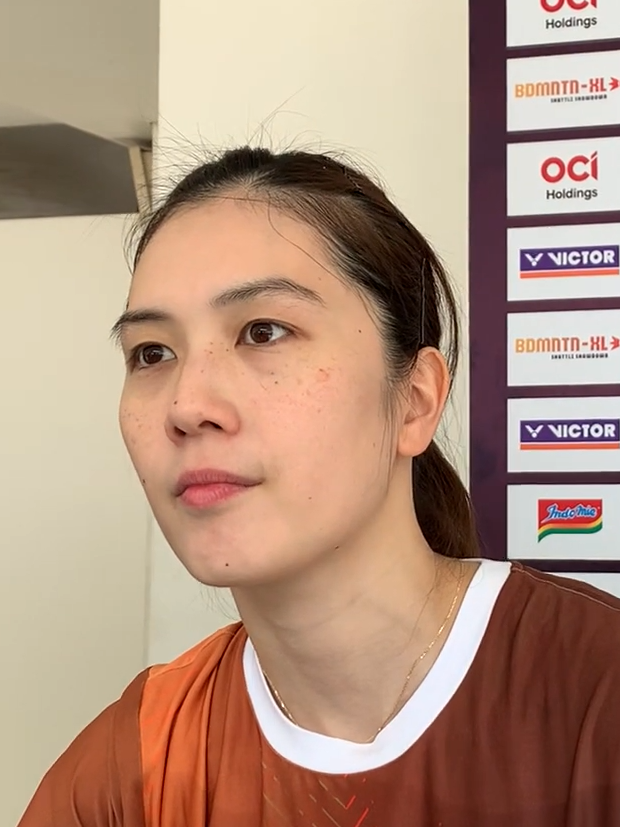
- Ohori in 2024

Personal information
- Native name: 大堀 彩
- Born: 2 October 1996 (age 30) Aizuwakamatsu, Japan
- Height: 1.69 m (5 ft 7 in)
- Weight: 59 kg (130 lb)
- Spouse: Ong Yew Sin (m. 2025)

Sport
- Country: Japan
- Sport: Badminton
- Handedness: Left
- Coached by: Hitoshi Ohori
- Retired: 15 December 2024

Women's singles
- Career record: 251 wins, 164 losses
- Highest ranking: 7 (17 December 2024)
- BWF profile
Medal record
Women's badminton
Representing Japan
Uber Cup
Silver medal – second place	2020 Aarhus	Women's team
Bronze medal – third place	2016 Kunshan	Women's team
Bronze medal – third place	2024 Chengdu	Women's team
Asian Games
Gold medal – first place	2018 Jakarta–Palembang	Women's team
Bronze medal – third place	2022 Hangzhou	Women's singles
Bronze medal – third place	2022 Hangzhou	Women's team
Asia Mixed Team Championships
Silver medal – second place	2019 Hong Kong	Mixed team
Asia Team Championships
Gold medal – first place	2018 Alor Setar	Women's team
Gold medal – first place	2020 Manila	Women's team
Bronze medal – third place	2024 Selangor	Women's team
East Asian Games
Bronze medal – third place	2013 Tianjin	Women's singles
Bronze medal – third place	2013 Tianjin	Women's team
World Junior Championships
Silver medal – second place	2012 Chiba	Mixed team
Silver medal – second place	2013 Bangkok	Girls' singles
Bronze medal – third place	2012 Chiba	Girls' singles
Bronze medal – third place	2014 Alor Setar	Girls' singles
Bronze medal – third place	2014 Alor Setar	Mixed team
Asian Junior Championships
Gold medal – first place	2012 Gimcheon	Mixed team
Gold medal – first place	2013 Kota Kinabalu	Girls' singles
Bronze medal – third place	2013 Kota Kinabalu	Mixed team
Bronze medal – third place	2014 Taipei	Mixed team

Aya Ohori (大堀 彩, Ōhori Aya; born 2 October 1996) is a former Japanese professional badminton player from Aizuwakamatsu, Fukushima Prefecture, Japan. She is affiliated with the Tonami Transportation badminton club. Ohori represented Japan at the 2024 Summer Olympics.

== Awards and nominations ==
Award	Year	Category	Result	Ref.
Minyu Prefectural Citizens' Awards	2025	Sports	Won	

== Personal life ==
Ohori and Malaysian doubles player, Ong Yew Sin, announced their engagement in March 2025 and were married later that June.

== Achievements ==
=== Asian Games ===
Women's singles
Year	Venue	Opponent	Score	Result
2022	Binjiang Gymnasium, Hangzhou, China	(China) Chen Yufei	21–18, 10–21, 8–21	Bronze

=== East Asian Games ===
Women's singles
Year	Venue	Opponent	Score	Result	Ref.
2013	Binhai New Area Dagang Gymnasium, Tianjin, China	(China) Han Li	16–21, 7–21	Bronze	

=== World Junior Championships ===
Girls' singles
Year	Venue	Opponent	Score	Result	Ref.
2012	Chiba Port Arena, Chiba, Japan	(Japan) Akane Yamaguchi	21–17, 10–21, 15–21	Bronze	
2013	Hua Mark Indoor Stadium, Bangkok, Thailand	(Japan) Akane Yamaguchi	11–21, 13–21	Silver	
2014	Stadium Sultan Abdul Halim, Alor Setar, Malaysia	(China) He Bingjiao	13–21, 19–21	Bronze	

=== Asian Junior Championships ===
Girls' singles
Year	Venue	Opponent	Score	Result
2013	Likas Indoor Stadium, Kota Kinabalu, Malaysia	(Thailand) Busanan Ongbamrungphan	21–11, 16–21, 21–13	Gold

=== BWF World Tour (2 titles) ===
The BWF World Tour, which was announced on 19 March 2017 and implemented in 2018, is a series of elite badminton tournaments sanctioned by the Badminton World Federation (BWF). The BWF World Tour is divided into levels of World Tour Finals, Super 1000, Super 750, Super 500, Super 300 (part of the HSBC World Tour), and the BWF Tour Super 100.

Women's singles
Year	Tournament	Level	Opponent	Score	Result	Ref.
2024	Thailand Masters	Super 300	(Thailand) Supanida Katethong	18–21, 21–17, 21–13	(gold) Winner	
2024	Australian Open	Super 500	(Indonesia) Ester Nurumi Tri Wardoyo	17–21, 21–19, 21–16	(gold) Winner	

=== BWF Grand Prix (5 titles, 3 runners-up) ===
The BWF Grand Prix had two levels, the Grand Prix and Grand Prix Gold. It was a series of badminton tournaments sanctioned by the Badminton World Federation (BWF) and played between 2007 and 2017.

Women's singles
Year	Tournament	Opponent	Score	Result	Ref.
2013	Russian Open	(Russia) Ksenia Polikarpova	21–5, 21–10	(gold) Winner	
2014	Russian Open	(Japan) Shizuka Uchida	21–19, 21–4	(gold) Winner	
2014	Vietnam Open	(Japan) Nozomi Okuhara	15–21, 11–21	(silver) Runner-up	
2016	New Zealand Open	(South Korea) Sung Ji-hyun	15–21, 17–21	(silver) Runner-up	
2016	Thailand Open	(Thailand) Busanan Ongbamrungphan	25–23, 21–8	(gold) Winner	
2017	Thailand Masters	(Thailand) Busanan Ongbamrungphan	18–21, 16–21	(silver) Runner-up	
2017	China Masters	(Japan) Saena Kawakami	21–9, 9–21, 21–18	(gold) Winner	
2017	U.S. Open	(Canada) Michelle Li	21–11, 21–19	(gold) Winner	

BWF Grand Prix Gold tournament
BWF Grand Prix tournament

=== BWF International Challenge/Series (1 title, 1 runner-up) ===
Women's singles
Year	Tournament	Opponent	Score	Result	Ref.
2015	Portugal International	(Japan) Sayaka Takahashi	13–21, 14–21	(silver) Runner-up	
2018	Yonex / K&D Graphics International	(Canada) Talia Ng	21–6, 21–7	(gold) Winner	

BWF International Challenge tournament
BWF International Series tournament

== Record against selected opponents ==
Record against year-end Finals finalists, World Championships semi-finalists, and Olympic quarter-finalists. Accurate as of 23 August 2026.

Player	M	W	L	Diff.
(China) Chen Yufei	14	0	14	–14
(China) Han Yue	8	1	7	–6
(China) He Bingjiao	9	1	8	–7
(China) Li Xuerui	1	0	1	–1
(China) Wang Shixian	1	0	1	–1
(China) Wang Zhiyi	9	4	5	–1
(China) Zhang Yiman	2	1	1	0
(Chinese Taipei) Tai Tzu-ying	12	2	10	–8
(Hong Kong) Yip Pui Yin	1	1	0	+1
(India) Saina Nehwal	2	2	0	+2
(India) P. V. Sindhu	14	1	13	–12
(Indonesia) Lindaweni Fanetri	1	1	0	+1

Player	M	W	L	Diff.
(Indonesia) Gregoria Mariska Tunjung	5	3	2	+1
(Indonesia) Putri Kusuma Wardani	3	1	2	–1
(Japan) Nozomi Okuhara	13	3	10	–7
(Japan) Akane Yamaguchi	7	0	7	–7
(South Korea) An Se-young	6	0	6	–6
(South Korea) Bae Yeon-ju	1	1	0	+1
(South Korea) Sung Ji-hyun	6	3	3	0
(Spain) Carolina Marín	3	1	2	–1
(Thailand) Porntip Buranaprasertsuk	3	1	2	–1
(Thailand) Pornpawee Chochuwong	6	1	5	–4
(Thailand) Ratchanok Intanon	8	4	4	0
