= Qin Jinjing =

Chinese-born Australian badminton player

Qin Jinjing 秦金晶
Personal information
- Born: 27 September 1996 (age 30) Shenzhen, Guangdong, China

Sport
- Country: Australia
- Sport: Badminton

Women's singles
- Career record: 49 wins, 18 losses
- Highest ranking: 170 (20 November 2014)
- Current ranking: 193 (17 March 2020)
- BWF profile
Medal record
Women's badminton
Representing China
World Junior Championships
Gold medal – first place	2012 Chiba	Mixed team
Gold medal – first place	2014 Alor Setar	Mixed team
Bronze medal – third place	2013 Bangkok	Mixed team
Bronze medal – third place	2014 Alor Setar	Girls' singles
Asian Youth Games
Gold medal – first place	2013 Nanjing	Girls' singles
Asian Junior Championships
Gold medal – first place	2013 Kota Kinabalu	Mixed team
Gold medal – first place	2014 Taipei	Mixed team
Bronze medal – third place	2013 Kota Kinabalu	Girls' singles

Qin Jinjing (Chinese: 秦金晶; pinyin: Qín jīnjīng; born 27 September 1996) is a former Chinese badminton player who later played for Australia.

== Career ==
Qin Jinjing began to play badminton from the first grade of elementary school, when she was 10 years old. Her biggest achievement was in the 2013 Asian Youth Games, where she won the gold medal in the girls' singles event by beating Thailand's Busanan Ongbamrungphan in the final. She also clinched the bronze medal in the 2013 Asian Junior Championships, and the 2014 World Junior Championships. In March 2018, Qin Jinjing played in the Australian National Championships and won the women's singles and mixed doubles championships.

== Achievements ==
=== BWF World Junior Championships ===
Girls' singles
Year	Venue	Opponent	Score	Result
2014	Stadium Sultan Abdul Halim, Alor Setar, Malaysia	(Japan) Akane Yamaguchi	21–19, 13–21, 14–21	Bronze

=== Asian Youth Games ===
Girls' singles
Year	Venue	Opponent	Score	Result
2013	Nanjing Sport Institute, Nanjing, China	(Thailand) Busanan Ongbamrungphan	19–21, 21–17, 21–16	Gold

=== Asian Junior Championships ===
Girls' singles
Year	Venue	Opponent	Score	Result
2013	Likas Indoor Stadium, Kota Kinabalu, Malaysia	(Japan) Aya Ohori	14–21, 12–21	Bronze

=== BWF International Challenge/Series (1 runner-up) ===
Women's singles
Year	Tournament	Opponent	Score	Result
2019	North Harbour International	(China) Qiu Ziying	3–11^{r}	(silver) Runner-up

BWF International Challenge tournament
BWF International Series tournament
BWF Future Series tournament

=== BWF Junior International (2 titles) ===
Girls' singles
Year	Tournament	Opponent	Score	Result
2014	Dutch Junior International	(China) Chen Mingchun	21–12, 21–16	(gold) Winner
2014	German Junior International	(China) Chen Yufei	21–10, 21–7	(gold) Winner

BWF Junior International Grand Prix tournament
BWF Junior International Challenge tournament
BWF Junior International Series tournament
BWF Junior Future Series tournament
