= 2018 Badminton Asia Team Championships =

Badminton championships

Tournament details
- Dates: 6–11 February
- Edition: 2
- Venue: Sultan Abdul Halim Stadium
- Location: Alor Setar, Malaysia

Champions
- Men's teams: Indonesia
- Women's teams: Japan

The 2018 Badminton Asia Team Championships was the second edition of Badminton Asia Team Championships, held at the Sultan Abdul Halim Stadium in Alor Setar, Malaysia, from 6 to 11 February 2018 and were organised by the Badminton Asia. This tournament also served as the Asian qualification for the 2018 Thomas & Uber Cup.

== Background ==
The 2018 Badminton Asia Team Championships officially crowned the best male and female national badminton teams in Asia and at the same time worked as the Asian qualification event towards the 2018 Thomas & Uber Cup finals. 28 teams, consisting of 15 men's teams and 13 women's teams entered the tournament.

=== Competition format ===
The competition begins with a group stage: all participating teams are divided into four groups of two or three teams each. Each team plays each other once, with the top two teams advancing to the knockout stage. A match is won by the team that first wins three games. The eight teams that qualify will be drawn and compete in a knockout format until the final.

Tie-breaker

Team ranking within a group is determined based on the following criteria: number of wins; match difference; game difference; and points difference. If two teams are tied after a criterion is applied, the winner of the match between the two teams will be ranked higher. A draw will be held to determine ranking if there are still teams tied after all criteria are applied.

=== Hosting ===
On 29 September 2017, Malaysia were chosen to host the Badminton Asia Team Championships in Alor Setar and will be using the Sultan Abdul Halim Stadium as the venue for the entire tournament.

== Schedule ==
Day, Date	Time	Phase
Tuesday, 6 February	09:00	Group Stage
Tuesday, 6 February	14:00	Group Stage
Tuesday, 6 February	19:00	Group Stage
Wednesday, 7 February	09:00	Group Stage
Wednesday, 7 February	14:00	Group Stage
Wednesday, 7 February	19:00	Group Stage
Thursday, 8 February	09:00	Group Stage
Thursday, 8 February	14:00	Group Stage
Thursday, 8 February	19:00	Group Stage
Friday, 9 February	08:30	Quarter-finals
Friday, 9 February	17:00	Quarter-finals
Saturday, 10 February	12:00	Semi-finals
Saturday, 10 February	18:00	Semi-finals
Sunday, 11 February	12:00	Finals
Sunday, 11 February	18:00	Finals
Note: All times are in Malaysia Standard Time (UTC+08:00)

== Teams ==
The tournament will feature 15 teams competing in the men's category and 13 teams in the women's category.

Nation	Men's	Women's	Nation	Men's	Women's
China	Yes	Yes	Myanmar	Yes	—N/a
Chinese Taipei	Yes	Yes	Nepal	Yes	—N/a
Hong Kong	Yes	Yes	Philippines	Yes	Yes
India	Yes	Yes	Singapore	Yes	Yes
Indonesia	Yes	Yes	South Korea	Yes	Yes
Japan	Yes	Yes	Thailand	Yes	Yes
Kazakhstan	Yes	—N/a	Vietnam	—N/a	Yes
Malaysia	Yes	Yes	Maldives	Yes	Yes

== Draw ==
=== Seedings ===
The seeding were as follows:

- Men's team
1. China
2. Indonesia
3. Chinese Taipei
4. Japan
5. India
6. South Korea
7. Malaysia
8. Hong Kong
- Women's team
1. Japan
2. China
3. South Korea
4. Thailand
5. Chinese Taipei
6. India
7. Indonesia
8. Malaysia

=== Drawn groups ===
The draw was held on 23 January 2018, at the tournament venue. The men's team group stage consisted of one group with three teams and three groups each with four teams. The women's team group stage consisted of three groups each with three teams and one group with four teams.

- Men's team

Group A	Group B	Group C	Group D
China (1); Hong Kong (8); Singapore	Japan (4); South Korea (6); Nepal; Kazakhstan	Chinese Taipei (3); Malaysia (7, H); Thailand; Myanmar	Indonesia (2); India (5); Philippines; Maldives

- Women's team

Group W	Group X	Group Y	Group Z
Japan (1); India (6); Hong Kong	South Korea (3); Chinese Taipei (5); Maldives	Thailand (4); Malaysia (8, H); Vietnam; Philippines	China (2); Indonesia (7); Singapore

== Medal summary ==
=== Medal table ===
* Host nation (Malaysia)

Rank	Nation	Gold	Silver	Bronze	Total
1	Indonesia	1	0	1	2
2	Japan	1	0	0	1
3	China	0	2	0	2
4	South Korea	0	0	2	2
5	Malaysia*	0	0	1	1
Totals (5 entries)		2	2	4	8

=== Medalists ===
Event	Gold	Silver	Bronze
Men's team	Indonesia; Mohammad Ahsan; Jonatan Christie; Marcus Fernaldi Gideon; Anthony Sinisuka Ginting; Firman Abdul Kholik; Ihsan Maulana Mustofa; Angga Pratama; Rian Agung Saputro; Hendra Setiawan; Kevin Sanjaya Sukamuljo	China; Chai Biao; Han Chengkai; He Jiting; Lu Guangzu; Qiao Bin; Shi Yuqi; Tan Qiang; Wang Zekang; Zhao Junpeng; Zhou Haodong	Malaysia; Goh Sze Fei; Goh V Shem; Nur Izzuddin; Lee Chong Wei; Lee Zii Jia; Ong Yew Sin; Soong Joo Ven; Tan Wee Kiong; Teo Ee Yi; Iskandar Zulkarnain Zainuddin
Men's team	Indonesia; Mohammad Ahsan; Jonatan Christie; Marcus Fernaldi Gideon; Anthony Sinisuka Ginting; Firman Abdul Kholik; Ihsan Maulana Mustofa; Angga Pratama; Rian Agung Saputro; Hendra Setiawan; Kevin Sanjaya Sukamuljo	China; Chai Biao; Han Chengkai; He Jiting; Lu Guangzu; Qiao Bin; Shi Yuqi; Tan Qiang; Wang Zekang; Zhao Junpeng; Zhou Haodong	South Korea; Choi Sol-gyu; Chung Eui-seok; Heo Kwang-hee; Jeon Hyeok-jin; Kang Min-hyuk; Kim Duk-young; Kim Won-ho; Lee Dong-keun; Seo Seung-jae; Son Wan-ho
Women's team	Japan; Yuki Fukushima; Sayaka Hirota; Misaki Matsutomo; Aya Ohori; Nozomi Okuhara; Sayaka Sato; Ayaka Takahashi; Shiho Tanaka; Akane Yamaguchi; Koharu Yonemoto	China; Cao Tongwei; Chen Xiaoxin; Chen Yufei; Dong Wenjing; Du Yue; Feng Xueying; Gao Fangjie; He Bingjiao; Li Yinhui; Zheng Yu	Indonesia; Anggia Shitta Awanda; Fitriani; Della Destiara Haris; Ruselli Hartawan; Ni Ketut Mahadewi Istarani; Greysia Polii; Rizki Amelia Pradipta; Apriyani Rahayu; Hanna Ramadini; Gregoria Mariska Tunjung
Women's team	Japan; Yuki Fukushima; Sayaka Hirota; Misaki Matsutomo; Aya Ohori; Nozomi Okuhara; Sayaka Sato; Ayaka Takahashi; Shiho Tanaka; Akane Yamaguchi; Koharu Yonemoto	China; Cao Tongwei; Chen Xiaoxin; Chen Yufei; Dong Wenjing; Du Yue; Feng Xueying; Gao Fangjie; He Bingjiao; Li Yinhui; Zheng Yu	South Korea; An Se-young; Baek Ha-na; Chang Ye-na; Jeon Joo-i; Kim Hye-rin; Lee Jang-mi; Lee So-hee; Lee Yu-rim; Shin Seung-chan; Sung Ji-hyun
