= Thailand Masters (badminton) =

Annual badminton tournament in Thailand

- Official website
- Founded: 2016; 10 years ago
- Editions: 9 (2026)
- Location: Bangkok (2026); Thailand
- Venue: Nimibutr Stadium (2026)
- Prize money: US$250,000 (2026)

Men's
- Draw: 32S / 32D
- Current champions: Zaki Ubaidillah (singles); Leo Rolly Carnando; Bagas Maulana (doubles)
- Most singles titles: 2 Tommy Sugiarto
- Most doubles titles: 2 Leo Rolly Carnando

Women's
- Draw: 32S / 32D
- Current champions: Devika Sihag (singles); Amallia Cahaya Pratiwi; Siti Fadia Silva Ramadhanti (doubles)
- Most singles titles: 1, all winners
- Most doubles titles: 2 Chen Qingchen; Jia Yifan; Benyapa Aimsaard; Nuntakarn Aimsaard; Siti Fadia Silva Ramadhanti

Mixed doubles
- Draw: 32
- Current champions: Adnan Maulana; Indah Cahya Sari Jamil
- Most titles (male): 2 Chan Peng Soon; Dechapol Puavaranukroh
- Most titles (female): 2 Goh Liu Ying

Super 300
- Canada Open; German Open; Korea Masters; Macau Open; New Zealand Open; Orléans Masters; Spain Masters; Swiss Open; Syed Modi International; Taipei Open; Thailand Masters; U.S. Open

Last completed
- 2026 Thailand Masters

The Thailand Masters is an international badminton tournament held starting from 2016. The tournament is launched to honor Princess Sirivannavari, who was a former badminton player. Currently, the level of the tournament is BWF World Tour Super 300, replacing the older structure of Grand Prix Gold. The first tournament was held in Bangkok and offered a total prize money of US$120,000, until 2018 it increased to US$150,000.

== Venues and host cities ==
- 2016–2018, 2023–present: Nimibutr Stadium, Bangkok
- 2019–2020: Indoor Stadium Huamark, Bangkok

== Past winners ==
Year	Men's singles	Women's singles	Men's doubles	Women's doubles	Mixed doubles	Ref
2016	(South Korea) Lee Hyun-il	(Thailand) Ratchanok Intanon	(Indonesia) Mohammad Ahsan (Indonesia) Hendra Setiawan	(China) Tian Qing (China) Zhao Yunlei	(China) Zheng Siwei (China) Chen Qingchen	
2017	(Indonesia) Tommy Sugiarto	(Thailand) Busanan Ongbamrungphan	(China) Huang Kaixiang (China) Wang Yilyu	(China) Chen Qingchen (China) Jia Yifan	(China) Zhang Nan (China) Li Yinhui	
2018	(Indonesia) Tommy Sugiarto	(Thailand) Nitchaon Jindapol	(Thailand) Tinn Isriyanet (Thailand) Kittisak Namdash	(Thailand) Jongkolphan Kititharakul (Thailand) Rawinda Prajongjai	(Malaysia) Chan Peng Soon (Malaysia) Goh Liu Ying	
2019	(Singapore) Loh Kean Yew	(Indonesia) Fitriani	(Malaysia) Goh V Shem (Malaysia) Tan Wee Kiong	(Thailand) Puttita Supajirakul (Thailand) Sapsiree Taerattanachai	(Malaysia) Chan Peng Soon (Malaysia) Goh Liu Ying	
2020	(Hong Kong) Ng Ka Long	(Japan) Akane Yamaguchi	(Malaysia) Ong Yew Sin (Malaysia) Teo Ee Yi	(China) Chen Qingchen (China) Jia Yifan	(England) Marcus Ellis (England) Lauren Smith	
2021	Cancelled (Note: This tournament, originally to be played from 12–17 January, was later cancelled due to the COVID-19 pandemic in Thailand.)					
2022	No competition					
2023	(Chinese Taipei) Lin Chun-yi	(China) Zhang Yiman	(Indonesia) Leo Rolly Carnando (Indonesia) Daniel Marthin	(Thailand) Benyapa Aimsaard (Thailand) Nuntakarn Aimsaard	(China) Feng Yanzhe (China) Huang Dongping	
2024	(Chinese Taipei) Chou Tien-chen	(Japan) Aya Ohori	(China) He Jiting (China) Ren Xiangyu	(Thailand) Benyapa Aimsaard (Thailand) Nuntakarn Aimsaard	(Thailand) Dechapol Puavaranukroh (Thailand) Sapsiree Taerattanachai	
2025	(Singapore) Jason Teh	(Thailand) Pornpawee Chochuwong	(South Korea) Jin Yong (South Korea) Seo Seung-jae	(Indonesia) Lanny Tria Mayasari (Indonesia) Siti Fadia Silva Ramadhanti	(Thailand) Dechapol Puavaranukroh (Thailand) Supissara Paewsampran	
2026	(Indonesia) Zaki Ubaidillah	(India) Devika Sihag	(Indonesia) Leo Rolly Carnando (Indonesia) Bagas Maulana	(Indonesia) Amallia Cahaya Pratiwi (Indonesia) Siti Fadia Silva Ramadhanti	(Indonesia) Adnan Maulana (Indonesia) Indah Cahya Sari Jamil	

== Performances by countries ==
As of the 2026 edition

Rank	Nation	MS	WS	MD	WD	XD	Total
1	Thailand		4	1	4	2	11
2	Indonesia	3	1	3	2	1	10
3	China		1	2	3	3	9
4	Malaysia			2		2	4
5	Chinese Taipei	2					2
5	Japan		2				2
5	Singapore	2					2
5	South Korea	1		1			2
9	England					1	1
9	Hong Kong	1					1
9	India		1				1
Total		9	9	9	9	9	45
