= Liang Xiaoyu =

- 梁小玉
- Occupation: Poet

Liang Xiaoyu (Chinese: 梁小玉; fl. late 16th century), also known by the courtesy name Yuji (玉姬) and the art name Langhuan nüshi (瑯環女史), was a Chinese late Ming Dynasty poet, playwright, writer, and courtesan. A prolific author of at least ten books, only a few of her poems survive.

Liang Xiaoyu was a native of Wulin (present-day Hangzhou). Repeatedly she began writing poetry at age seven. Her more traditional work was praised and examples survive in anthologies, but her poems about romantic feelings and "secret games" (sexual intercourse) were criticized as vulgar and do not survive. Her lost books include her collected poetry, The Langhuan Collection (Langhuan ji 瑯環集), Rhapsody on the Two Capitals (Liangdu fu), Description of the Countries of in the Classic of Mountains and Seas (Shanhai qunguo zhi), and A History of Women Past and Present (Gujin niishi 古今女史).

From a modern perspective, what is known of Liang Xiaoyu's work can be read as feminist. Her A History of Women divides women into eight categories: religious women (wai shi), national heroines (guo shi), recluses (yin shi), martyrs (lie shi), talented women (cai shi), literary women (yun shi), love stories (yan shi), and moral paradigms (jie shi). Unlike other commentators, her poem about Xi Shi, sent to seduce Fuchai of Wu, places the blame for the downfall of Wu not on Xi Shi, but the ruler of Wu. Liang Xiaoyu had a room in her home called Temple of the Three Queens of the Flowery Altar, where there was an altar to honor three historical courtesans: Xue Tao, Su Xiaoxiao, and Guan Panpan.

Liang Xiaoyu was also an early Chinese female playwright. Her lost play Reunion (Heyuan ji 合 元 记 ) tells the famous story of Huang Chonggu, who impersonated a man to become a successful civil servant. The trope of "female talent fulfilled through male disguise" was frequently taken up by Chinese female playwrights.

Luo Qilan is one of the historical women who appear in Qiu Jin's utopian novel Pebbles that Fill up the Sea (1907).
