= 2023 Japan Masters =

Badminton tournament in Japan

Tournament details
- Dates: 14–19 November
- Edition: 1st
- Level: Super 500
- Total prize money: US$420,000
- Venue: Kumamoto Prefectural Gymnasium
- Location: Kumamoto, Japan

Champions
- Men's singles: (Denmark) Viktor Axelsen
- Women's singles: (Indonesia) Gregoria Mariska Tunjung
- Men's doubles: (China) He Jiting (China) Ren Xiangyu
- Women's doubles: (China) Zhang Shuxian (China) Zheng Yu
- Mixed doubles: (China) Zheng Siwei (China) Huang Yaqiong

The 2023 Japan Masters (officially known as the Kumamoto Masters Japan 2023) was a badminton tournament that took place at Kumamoto Prefectural Gymnasium in Kumamoto, Japan, from 14 to 19 November 2023 and had a total prize of $420,000.

== Tournament ==
The 2023 Japan Masters was the thirty-second tournament of the 2023 BWF World Tour and was also the inaugural edition of Japan Masters championship. This tournament was organized by the Nippon Badminton Association with sanction from the BWF.

=== Venue ===
This tournament was held at Kumamoto Prefectural Gymnasium in Kumamoto, Japan.

=== Point distribution ===
Below is the point distribution table for each phase of the tournament based on the BWF points system for the BWF World Tour Super 500 event.

Winner	Runner-up	3/4	5/8	9/16	17/32	33/64	65/128
9,200	7,800	6,420	5,040	3,600	2,220	880	430

=== Prize pool ===
The total prize money is US$420,000 with the distribution of the prize money in accordance with BWF regulations.

Event	Winner	Finalist	Semi-finals	Quarter-finals	Last 16
Singles	$31,500	$15,960	$6,090	$2,520	$1,470
Doubles	$33,180	$15,960	$5,880	$3,045	$1,575

== Men's singles ==
=== Seeds ===
1. (Denmark) Viktor Axelsen (champion)
2. (Indonesia) Anthony Sinisuka Ginting (first round)
3. (Japan) Kodai Naraoka (second round)
4. (China) Shi Yuqi (final)
5. (Thailand) Kunlavut Vitidsarn (withdrew)
6. (Indonesia) Jonatan Christie (quarter-finals)
7. (India) Prannoy H. S. (second round)
8. (Singapore) Loh Kean Yew (first round)

=== Finals ===
Semi-finals
1	(Denmark) Viktor Axelsen	21	21
Q1	(Japan) Takuma Obayashi	7	13
4	(China) Shi Yuqi	21	21
(Chinese Taipei) Chou Tien-chen	15	16

Final
1	(Denmark) Viktor Axelsen	22	21
4	(China) Shi Yuqi	20	17

=== Top half ===
==== Section 1 ====
First round
1	(Denmark) V Axelsen	21	21
(Indonesia) C A Dwi Wardoyo	11	7
(Chinese Taipei) Wang T-w	12	11
(Malaysia) Ng T Y	21	21
6	(Indonesia) J Christie	21	21
Q4	(Chinese Taipei) Chi Y-j	14	9
PFQ	(Chinese Taipei) Su L-y	21	17	24
Q2	(South Korea) Jeon H-j	15	21	22

Second round
1	(Denmark) V Axelsen	20	21	21
(Malaysia) Ng T Y	22	11	18
6	(Indonesia) J Christie	19	21	22
PFQ	(Chinese Taipei) Su L-y	21	11	20

Quarter-finals
1	(Denmark) V Axelsen	15	21	21
6	(Indonesia) J Christie	21	18	9

==== Section 2 ====
First round
3	(Japan) K Naraoka	21	21
(India) L Sen	17	10
(Malaysia) Lee Z J	18	20
(Denmark) A Antonsen	21	22
PFQ	(Thailand) K Wangcharoen	18	8
Q1	(Japan) T Obayashi	21	21
(Chinese Taipei) Lin C-y	21	21
(India) P Rajawat	15	12

Second round
3	(Japan) K Naraoka	21	17
(Denmark) A Antonsen	23	21
Q1	(Japan) T Obayashi	21	16	21
(Chinese Taipei) Lin C-y	15	21	17

Quarter-finals
(Denmark) A Antonsen	12	21	12
Q1	(Japan) T Obayashi	21	10	21

=== Bottom half ===
==== Section 3 ====
First round
(Denmark) R Gemke	21	21
(Hong Kong) Ng K L	14	19
Q3	(Japan) K Momota	18	26	21
8	(Singapore) Loh K Y	21	24	19
PFQ	(Chinese Taipei) Lee C-h	21	10	9
(China) Lu GZ	11	21	21
(Japan) K Nishimoto	21	15	18
4	(China) Shi YQ	15	21	21

Second round
(Denmark) R Gemke	19	22	16
Q3	(Japan) K Momota	21	20	21
(China) Lu GZ	19	11
4	(China) Shi YQ	21	21

Quarter-finals
Q3	(Japan) K Momota	17	12
4	(China) Shi YQ	21	21

==== Section 4 ====
First round
(Chinese Taipei) Chou T-c	21	21
(Japan) K Tsuneyama	14	9
(Hong Kong) Lee C Y	20	21	17
7	(India) Prannoy H. S.	22	19	21
(Japan) K Watanabe	21	21
(Denmark) M Johannesen	16	14
(China) Weng HY	21	18	21
2	(Indonesia) A S Ginting	16	21	17

Second round
(Chinese Taipei) Chou T-c	19	21	21
7	(India) Prannoy H. S.	21	16	19
(Japan) K Watanabe	19	21	21
(China) Weng HY	21	9	19

Quarter-finals
(Chinese Taipei) Chou T-c	21	21
(Japan) K Watanabe	17	15

== Women's singles ==
=== Seeds ===
1. (South Korea) An Se-young (semi-finals)
2. (Japan) Akane Yamaguchi (withdrew)
3. (China) Chen Yufei (final)
4. (Chinese Taipei) Tai Tzu-ying (quarter-finals)
5. (Spain) Carolina Marín (quarter-finals)
6. (Indonesia) Gregoria Mariska Tunjung (champion)
7. (United States) Beiwen Zhang (semi-finals)
8. (India) P. V. Sindhu (withdrew)

=== Finals ===
Semi-finals
1	(South Korea) An Se-young	18	22	8
3	(China) Chen Yufei	21	20	21
7	(United States) Beiwen Zhang	12	13
6	(Indonesia) Gregoria Mariska Tunjung	21	21

Final
3	(China) Chen Yufei	12	12
6	(Indonesia) Gregoria Mariska Tunjung	21	21

=== Top half ===
==== Section 1 ====
First round
1	(South Korea) An S-y	22	21
(Chinese Taipei) Pai Y-p	20	13
(China) Gao FJ	w	/	o
Q1
PFQ	(Japan) A Takahashi	21	16	18
PFQ	(Chinese Taipei) Liang T-y	17	21	21
Q4	(Chinese Taipei) Lin S-y	4	7
(Thailand) S Katethong	21	21

Second round
1	(South Korea) An S-y	21	21
(China) Gao FJ	15	18
PFQ	(Chinese Taipei) Liang T-y	11	13
(Thailand) S Katethong	21	21

Quarter-finals
1	(South Korea) An S-y	21	21
(Thailand) S Katethong	17	9

==== Section 2 ====
First round
3	(China) Chen YF	21	21
PFQ	(Chinese Taipei) Huang Y-h	8	13
Q2	(Japan) T Miyazaki	21	21
(Japan) S Kawakami	13	17
5	(Spain) C Marín	21	21
(Chinese Taipei) Sung S-y	13	10
(Japan) A Ohori	21	21
(Chinese Taipei) Hsu W-c	13	19

Second round
3	(China) Chen YF	23	21
Q2	(Japan) T Miyazaki	21	12
5	(Spain) C Marín	15	21	21
(Japan) A Ohori	21	15	15

Quarter-finals
3	(China) Chen YF	21	21
5	(Spain) C Marín	12	9

=== Bottom half ===
==== Section 3 ====
First round
(Scotland) K Gilmour	22	21
(Germany) Y Li	20	16
Q3	(Chinese Taipei) Yu C-h	17	14
7	(United States) BW Zhang	21	21
PFQ	(Chinese Taipei) Lin H-t	18	21	18
(Thailand) L Chaiwan	21	18	21
PFQ	(Japan) M Suizu	8	13
4	(Chinese Taipei) Tai T-y	21	21

Second round
(Scotland) K Gilmour	13	14
7	(United States) BW Zhang	21	21
(Thailand) L Chaiwan	18	15
4	(Chinese Taipei) Tai T-y	21	21

Quarter-finals
7	(United States) BW Zhang	19	21	6
4	(Chinese Taipei) Tai T-y	21	19	0^{r}

==== Section 4 ====
First round
(South Korea) Kim G-e	11
(Indonesia) P K Wardani	5^{r}
(Japan) N Okuhara	19	19
6	(Indonesia) G M Tunjung	21	21
(Thailand) B Ongbamrungphan	17	20
(Singapore) Yeo J M	21	22
(Japan) N Nidaira	21	21
PFQ	(Chinese Taipei) Huang C-p	17	10

Second round
(South Korea) Kim G-e	21	12
6	(Indonesia) G M Tunjung	23	21
(Singapore) Yeo J M	21	21
(Japan) N Nidaira	13	16

Quarter-finals
6	(Indonesia) G M Tunjung	22	21
(Singapore) Yeo J M	20	19

== Men's doubles ==
=== Seeds ===
1. (India) Satwiksairaj Rankireddy / Chirag Shetty (first round)
2. (Indonesia) Fajar Alfian / Muhammad Rian Ardianto (withdrew)
3. (China) Liang Weikeng / Wang Chang (withdrew)
4. (Malaysia) Aaron Chia / Soh Wooi Yik (second round)
5. (South Korea) Kang Min-hyuk / Seo Seung-jae (second round)
6. (Japan) Takuro Hoki / Yugo Kobayashi (quarter-finals)
7. (China) Liu Yuchen / Ou Xuanyi (final)
8. (Malaysia) Ong Yew Sin / Teo Ee Yi (semi-finals)

=== Finals ===
Semi-finals
8	(Malaysia) Ong Yew Sin (Malaysia) Teo Ee Yi	21	20	17
7	(China) Liu Yuchen (China) Ou Xuanyi	16	22	21
(China) He Jiting (China) Ren Xiangyu	21	21
(China) Tan Qiang (China) Zhou Haodong	13	16

Final
7	(China) Liu Yuchen (China) Ou Xuanyi	14	21	15
(China) He Jiting (China) Ren Xiangyu	21	15	21

=== Top half ===
==== Section 1 ====
First round
1	(India) S Rankireddy (India) C Shetty	21	18	16
(Chinese Taipei) Lu C-y (Chinese Taipei) Yang P-ha	16	21	21
Q3	(Japan) K Kumagai (Japan) K Ogawa	21	17	17
(Chinese Taipei) Lee F-c (Chinese Taipei) Lee F-j	16	21	21
8	(Malaysia) Ong Y S (Malaysia) Teo E Y	21	21
(Malaysia) Man W C (Malaysia) Tee K W	16	7
Q4	(Thailand) P Kaosamaang (Thailand) W Thongsa-nga	21	21
(China) Chen BY (China) Liu Y	19	18

Second round
(Chinese Taipei) Lu C-y (Chinese Taipei) Yang P-ha	21	11	14
(Chinese Taipei) Lee F-c (Chinese Taipei) Lee F-j	12	21	21
8	(Malaysia) Ong Y S (Malaysia) Teo E Y	14	21	21
Q4	(Thailand) P Kaosamaang (Thailand) W Thongsa-nga	21	15	15

Quarter-finals
(Chinese Taipei) Lee F-c (Chinese Taipei) Lee F-j	19	16
8	(Malaysia) Ong Y S (Malaysia) Teo E Y	21	21

==== Section 2 ====
First round
4	(Malaysia) A Chia (Malaysia) Soh W Y	21	21
(Chinese Taipei) Lee Y (Chinese Taipei) Wang C-l	18	14
(Japan) A Koga (Japan) T Saito	21	21
(Indonesia) M S Fikri (Indonesia) B Maulana	18	16
7	(China) Liu YC (China) Ou XY	w	/	o
Q1
(Indonesia) P Kusumawardana (Indonesia) Y Rambitan	16	21	21
(England) B Lane (England) S Vendy	21	19	17

Second round
4	(Malaysia) A Chia (Malaysia) Soh W Y	18	16
(Japan) A Koga (Japan) T Saito	21	21
7	(China) Liu YC (China) Ou XY	21	21
(Indonesia) P Kusumawardana (Indonesia) Y Rambitan	19	13

Quarter-finals
(Japan) A Koga (Japan) T Saito	19	13
7	(China) Liu YC (China) Ou XY	21	21

=== Bottom half ===
==== Section 3 ====
First round
(Japan) K Mitsuhashi (Japan) H Okamura	21	21
(Indonesia) M Ahsan (Indonesia) H Setiawan	16	14
(Japan) K Matsui (Japan) Y Takeuchi	13	12
5	(South Korea) Kang M-h (South Korea) Seo S-j	21	21
Q2	(Indonesia) R Hidayat (Indonesia) K S Sukamuljo	21	21
(Malaysia) Goh S F (Malaysia) N Izzuddin	19	14
(China) He JT (China) Ren XY	21	21
PFQ	(Chinese Taipei) Chiu H-c (Chinese Taipei) Yang M-t	19	16

Second round
(Japan) K Mitsuhashi (Japan) H Okamura	21	21
5	(South Korea) Kang M-h (South Korea) Seo S-j	14	16
Q2	(Indonesia) R Hidayat (Indonesia) K S Sukamuljo	10	17
(China) He JT (China) Ren XY	21	21

Quarter-finals
(Japan) K Mitsuhashi (Japan) H Okamura	17	16
(China) He JT (China) Ren XY	21	21

==== Section 4 ====
First round
PFQ	(South Korea) Jin Y (South Korea) Na S-s	18	15
(Chinese Taipei) Lee J-h (Chinese Taipei) Yang P-hs	21	21
(Indonesia) L R Carnando (Indonesia) D Marthin	14	21	18
6	(Japan) T Hoki (Japan) Y Kobayashi	21	10	21
(Chinese Taipei) Chang K-c (Chinese Taipei) Po L-w	18	14
(China) Tan Q (China) Zhou HD	21	21
(Germany) M Lamsfuß (Germany) M Seidel	21	19	21
PFQ	(Japan) A Endo (Japan) Y Takei	17	21	7

Second round
(Chinese Taipei) Lee J-h (Chinese Taipei) Yang P-hs	15	21	19
6	(Japan) T Hoki (Japan) Y Kobayashi	21	17	21
(China) Tan Q (China) Zhou HD	11	21	21
(Germany) M Lamsfuß (Germany) M Seidel	21	12	14

Quarter-finals
6	(Japan) T Hoki (Japan) Y Kobayashi	15	21	17
(China) Tan Q (China) Zhou HD	21	17	21

== Women's doubles ==
=== Seeds ===
1. (China) Chen Qingchen / Jia Yifan (first round)
2. (South Korea) Baek Ha-na / Lee So-hee (withdrew)
3. (South Korea) Kim So-yeong / Kong Hee-yong (first round)
4. (Japan) Yuki Fukushima / Sayaka Hirota (first round)
5. (Japan) Nami Matsuyama / Chiharu Shida (first round)
6. (China) Zhang Shuxian / Zheng Yu (champions)
7. (Indonesia) Apriyani Rahayu / Siti Fadia Silva Ramadhanti (withdrew)
8. (Japan) Mayu Matsumoto / Wakana Nagahara (semi-finals)

=== Finals ===
Semi-finals
8	(Japan) Mayu Matsumoto (Japan) Wakana Nagahara	16	21
(China) Liu Shengshu (China) Tan Ning	21	23
(Japan) Rena Miyaura (Japan) Ayako Sakuramoto	12	15
6	(China) Zhang Shuxian (China) Zheng Yu	21	21

Final
(China) Liu Shengshu (China) Tan Ning	21	12	17
6	(China) Zhang Shuxian (China) Zheng Yu	12	21	21

=== Top half ===
==== Section 1 ====
First round
1	(China) Chen QC (China) Jia YF	11^{r}
(Germany) L Efler (Germany) I Lohau	8
(Thailand) J Kititharakul (Thailand) R Prajongjai	21	21
(Chinese Taipei) Hsu Y-c (Chinese Taipei) Lin W-c	11	7
8	(Japan) M Matsumoto (Japan) W Nagahara	21	21
PFQ	(Scotland) J MacPherson (Scotland) C Torrance	8	19
(Indonesia) F D Kusuma (Indonesia) A C Pratiwi	12	11
(Japan) R Iwanaga (Japan) K Nakanishi	21	21

Second round
(Germany) L Efler (Germany) I Lohau	12	20
(Thailand) J Kititharakul (Thailand) R Prajongjai	21	22
8	(Japan) M Matsumoto (Japan) W Nagahara	21	21
(Japan) R Iwanaga (Japan) K Nakanishi	11	13

Quarter-finals
(Thailand) J Kititharakul (Thailand) R Prajongjai	12	18
8	(Japan) M Matsumoto (Japan) W Nagahara	21	21

==== Section 2 ====
First round
4	(Japan) Y Fukushima (Japan) S Hirota	21	18	18
(China) Liu SS (China) Tan N	19	21	21
(South Korea) Jeong N-e (South Korea) Kim H-j	11	19
(China) Keng SL (China) Zhang C	21	21
5	(Japan) N Matsuyama (Japan) C Shida	21	20	12
(Thailand) B Aimsaard (Thailand) N Aimsaard	19	22	21
(China) Li WM (China) Liu XX	15	11
Q1	(Chinese Taipei) N G Chan (Chinese Taipei) Yang C-y	21	21

Second round
(China) Liu SS (China) Tan N	23	21
(China) Keng SL (China) Zhang C	21	14
(Thailand) B Aimsaard (Thailand) N Aimsaard	21	21
Q1	(Chinese Taipei) N G Chan (Chinese Taipei) Yang C-y	9	11

Quarter-finals
(China) Liu SS (China) Tan N	15	21	21
(Thailand) B Aimsaard (Thailand) N Aimsaard	21	16	18

=== Bottom half ===
==== Section 3 ====
First round
(South Korea) Lee Y-l (South Korea) Shin S-c	14	22	18
(Malaysia) P Tan (Malaysia) Thinaah M	21	20	21
(Japan) R Hirokami (Japan) Y Kato	21	22
PFQ	(United States) F Corbett (United States) A Lee	16	20
(Japan) R Miyaura (Japan) A Sakuramoto	21	21
(Malaysia) V Hoo (Malaysia) Lim C S	17	11
Q3	(Chinese Taipei) Sung S-y (Chinese Taipei) Yu C-h	7
3	(South Korea) Kim S-y (South Korea) Kong H-y	11^{r}

Second round
(Malaysia) P Tan (Malaysia) Thinaah M	21	21
(Japan) R Hirokami (Japan) Y Kato	17	16
(Japan) R Miyaura (Japan) A Sakuramoto	21	21
Q3	(Chinese Taipei) Sung S-y (Chinese Taipei) Yu C-h	13	11

Quarter-finals
(Malaysia) P Tan (Malaysia) Thinaah M	13	18
(Japan) R Miyaura (Japan) A Sakuramoto	21	21

==== Section 4 ====
First round
(Malaysia) A Cheong (Malaysia) Teoh M X	21	19	7^{r}
Q4	(Japan) S Hobara (Japan) Y Suizu	14	21	15
(China) Li YJ (China) Luo XM	18	13
6	(China) Zhang SX (China) Zheng Y	21	21
(Hong Kong) Yeung N T (Hong Kong) Yeung P L	21	18	19
(Chinese Taipei) Lee C-h (Chinese Taipei) Teng C-h	13	21	21
Q2	(Chinese Taipei) Cheng Y-p (Chinese Taipei) Sun W-p	17	16
PFQ	(Chinese Taipei) Chang C-h (Chinese Taipei) Yang C-t	21	21

Second round
Q4	(Japan) S Hobara (Japan) Y Suizu	17	10
6	(China) Zhang SX (China) Zheng Y	21	21
(Chinese Taipei) Lee C-h (Chinese Taipei) Teng C-h	21	21
PFQ	(Chinese Taipei) Chang C-h (Chinese Taipei) Yang C-t	13	10

Quarter-finals
6	(China) Zhang SX (China) Zheng Y	21	21
(Chinese Taipei) Lee C-h (Chinese Taipei) Teng C-h	9	14

== Mixed doubles ==
=== Seeds ===
1. (China) Zheng Siwei / Huang Yaqiong (champions)
2. (Japan) Yuta Watanabe / Arisa Higashino (semi-finals)
3. (China) Feng Yanzhe / Huang Dongping (final)
4. (South Korea) Seo Seung-jae / Chae Yoo-jung (semi-finals)
5. (China) Jiang Zhenbang / Wei Yaxin (quarter-finals)
6. (South Korea) Kim Won-ho / Jeong Na-eun (second round)
7. (France) Thom Gicquel / Delphine Delrue (withdrew)
8. (Malaysia) Chen Tang Jie / Toh Ee Wei (quarter-finals)

=== Finals ===
Semi-finals
1	(China) Zheng Siwei (China) Huang Yaqiong	20	23	21
4	(South Korea) Seo Seung-jae (South Korea) Chae Yoo-jung	22	21	13
3	(China) Feng Yanzhe (China) Huang Dongping	18	21	24
2	(Japan) Yuta Watanabe (Japan) Arisa Higashino	21	15	22

Final
1	(China) Zheng Siwei (China) Huang Yaqiong	25	21
3	(China) Feng Yanzhe (China) Huang Dongping	23	9

=== Top half ===
==== Section 1 ====
First round
1	(China) Zheng SW (China) Huang YQ	21	21	21
(Hong Kong) Tang C M (Hong Kong) Tse Y S	23	18	16
(Japan) H Midorikawa (Japan) N Saito	21	21
(Netherlands) R Tabeling (Netherlands) S Piek	11	17
8	(Malaysia) Chen T J (Malaysia) Toh E W	21	21
Q3	(Chinese Taipei) Wei C-w (Chinese Taipei) N G Chan	11	10
(Scotland) A Hall (Scotland) J MacPherson	11	11
(Malaysia) Goh S H (Malaysia) S J Lai	21	21

Second round
1	(China) Zheng SW (China) Huang YQ	21	21
(Japan) H Midorikawa (Japan) N Saito	6	17
8	(Malaysia) Chen T J (Malaysia) Toh E W	16	21	21
(Malaysia) Goh S H (Malaysia) S J Lai	21	13	13

Quarter-finals
1	(China) Zheng SW (China) Huang YQ	21	21
8	(Malaysia) Chen T J (Malaysia) Toh E W	14	14

==== Section 2 ====
First round
4	(South Korea) Seo S-j (South Korea) Chae Y-j	21	21
(Japan) Y Kaneko (Japan) M Matsutomo	15	17
(Indonesia) R Rivaldy (Indonesia) P H Mentari	21	22
(Chinese Taipei) Lee J-h (Chinese Taipei) Hsu Y-c	17	20
5	(China) Jiang ZB (China) Wei YX	21	21
(Indonesia) R N Kusharjanto (Indonesia) L A Kusumawati	12	13
Q4	(Japan) Y Eto (Japan) A Kamiyama	15	17
(Japan) H Nishi (Japan) A Sato	21	21

Second round
4	(South Korea) Seo S-j (South Korea) Chae Y-j	21	24
(Indonesia) R Rivaldy (Indonesia) P H Mentari	16	22
5	(China) Jiang ZB (China) Wei YX	21	21
(Japan) H Nishi (Japan) A Sato	13	18

Quarter-finals
4	(South Korea) Seo S-j (South Korea) Chae Y-j	21	21
5	(China) Jiang ZB (China) Wei YX	19	19

=== Bottom half ===
==== Section 3 ====
First round
(Japan) K Yamashita (Japan) N Shinoya	21	21
(Chinese Taipei) Yang P-h (Chinese Taipei) Hu L-f	15	18
(Chinese Taipei) Chang K-c (Chinese Taipei) Lee C-c	21	21
PFQ	(United States) P Smith (United States) A Lee	17	15
(Hong Kong) Lee C H (Hong Kong) Ng T Y	21	21
Q2	(Chinese Taipei) Lu C (Chinese Taipei) Cheng Y-p	13	18
Q1	(Chinese Taipei) Wu H-y (Chinese Taipei) Yang C-y	22	10
3	(China) Feng YZ (China) Huang DP	24	21

Second round
(Japan) K Yamashita (Japan) N Shinoya	21	21
(Chinese Taipei) Chang K-c (Chinese Taipei) Lee C-c	13	12
(Hong Kong) Lee C H (Hong Kong) Ng T Y	13	11
3	(China) Feng YZ (China) Huang DP	21	21

Quarter-finals
(Japan) K Yamashita (Japan) N Shinoya	21	18	7
3	(China) Feng YZ (China) Huang DP	14	21	21

==== Section 4 ====
First round
PFQ	(Chinese Taipei) Chen Z-r (Chinese Taipei) Yang C-t	22	13	15
(Malaysia) Tan K M (Malaysia) Lai P J	20	21	21
(Denmark) M Christiansen (Denmark) A Bøje	21	22	12
6	(South Korea) Kim W-h (South Korea) Jeong N-e	16	24	21
(Chinese Taipei) Ye H-w (Chinese Taipei) Lee C-h	21	22
PFQ	(Chinese Taipei) Chiu H-c (Chinese Taipei) Lin X-m	18	20
(Germany) M Lamsfuß (Germany) I Lohau	19	12
2	(Japan) Y Watanabe (Japan) A Higashino	21	21

Second round
(Malaysia) Tan K M (Malaysia) Lai P J	21	21
6	(South Korea) Kim W-h (South Korea) Jeong N-e	14	17
(Chinese Taipei) Ye H-w (Chinese Taipei) Lee C-h	20	20
2	(Japan) Y Watanabe (Japan) A Higashino	22	22

Quarter-finals
(Malaysia) Tan K M (Malaysia) Lai P J	15	16
2	(Japan) Y Watanabe (Japan) A Higashino	21	21

Preceded by 2023 Korea Masters	BWF World Tour; 2023 BWF season	Succeeded by 2023 China Masters
