= 2023 China Masters =

Badminton tournament in China

2025 China Masters
Tournament details
- Dates: 21–26 November
- Edition: 16th
- Level: Super 750
- Total prize money: US$1,150,000
- Venue: Shenzhen Bay Gymnasium
- Location: Shenzhen, China

Champions
- Men's singles: (Japan) Kodai Naraoka
- Women's singles: (China) Chen Yufei
- Men's doubles: (China) Liang Weikeng (China) Wang Chang
- Women's doubles: (Japan) Nami Matsuyama (Japan) Chiharu Shida
- Mixed doubles: (China) Zheng Siwei (China) Huang Yaqiong

The 2023 China Masters (officially known as the Li-Ning China Masters 2023 for sponsorship reasons) was a badminton tournament that took place at Shenzhen Bay Gymnasium in Shenzhen, China, from 21 to 26 November 2023 and had a total prize of $1,150,000.

== Tournament ==
The 2023 China Masters was the thirty-third tournament of the 2023 BWF World Tour and was also part of the China Masters championships, which have been held since 2005. This tournament was organized by the Chinese Badminton Association with sanction from the BWF.

=== Venue ===
This international tournament was held at Shenzhen Bay Gymnasium in Shenzhen, China.

=== Point distribution ===
Below is the point distribution table for each phase of the tournament based on the BWF points system for the BWF World Tour Super 750 event.

Winner	Runner-up	3/4	5/8	9/16	17/32
11,000	9,350	7,700	6,050	4,320	2,660

=== Prize pool ===
The total prize money is US$1,150,000 with the distribution of the prize money in accordance with BWF regulations.

Event	Winner	Finalist	Semi-finals	Quarter-finals	Last 16	Last 32
Singles	$80,500	$39,100	$16,100	$6,325	$3,450	$1,150
Doubles	$85,100	$40,250	$16,100	$7,187.5	$3,737.5	$1,150

== Men's singles ==
=== Seeds ===
1. (Denmark) Viktor Axelsen (withdrew)
2. (Indonesia) Anthony Sinisuka Ginting (second round)
3. (Japan) Kodai Naraoka (champion)
4. (Thailand) Kunlavut Vitidsarn (second round)
5. (China) Li Shifeng (first round)
6. (Indonesia) Jonatan Christie (withdrew)
7. (China) Shi Yuqi (second round)
8. (India) Prannoy H. S. (quarter-finals)

=== Finals ===
Semi-finals
(Japan) Kanta Tsuneyama	15	19
3	(Japan) Kodai Naraoka	21	21
(Japan) Kenta Nishimoto	21	21
(China) Zhao Junpeng	17	8

Final
3	(Japan) Kodai Naraoka	21	21
(Japan) Kenta Nishimoto	13	13

=== Top half ===
==== Section 1 ====
First round
PFR	(Chinese Taipei) Su L-y	13	10
(Chinese Taipei) Wang T-w	21	21
(Japan) K Watanabe	18	21	13
(Japan) K Tsuneyama	21	9	21
7	(China) Shi YQ	21	21
(India) L Sen	19	18
(Canada) B Yang	16	21	18
(France) C Popov	21	18	21

Second round
(Chinese Taipei) Wang T-w	14	19
(Japan) K Tsuneyama	21	21
7	(China) Shi YQ	15	19
(France) C Popov	21	21

Quarter-finals
(Japan) K Tsuneyama	21	21
(France) C Popov	18	19

==== Section 2 ====
First round
3	(Japan) K Naraoka	21	21
PFR	(Chinese Taipei) Lee C-h	19	11
(China) Weng HY	13	12
(Denmark) A Antonsen	21	21
8	(India) Prannoy H. S.	21	22
(Chinese Taipei) Chou T-c	18	20
(Denmark) M Johannesen	15	21	21
(Hong Kong) Lee C Y	21	17	19

Second round
3	(Japan) K Naraoka	21	12	21
(Denmark) A Antonsen	19	21	19
8	(India) Prannoy H. S.	21	21
(Denmark) M Johannesen	12	18

Quarter-finals
3	(Japan) K Naraoka	21	21
8	(India) Prannoy H. S.	9	14

=== Bottom half ===
==== Section 3 ====
First round
(Malaysia) Ng T Y	15	22	17
(Malaysia) Lee Z J	21	20	21
(China) Lu GZ	22	21
PFR	(Thailand) K Wangcharoen	20	16
(Japan) K Nishimoto	21	21
(India) P Rajawat	17	14
(India) S Kidambi	15	21	13
4	(Thailand) K Vitidsarn	21	14	21

Second round
(Malaysia) Lee Z J	21	21
(China) Lu GZ	10	12
(Japan) K Nishimoto	21	21	21
4	(Thailand) K Vitidsarn	15	23	10

Quarter-finals
(Malaysia) Lee Z J	11	12
(Japan) K Nishimoto	21	21

==== Section 4 ====
First round
(China) Zhao JP	21	21
(Indonesia) C A Dwi Wardoyo	10	8
(Denmark) R Gemke	21	21
5	(China) Li SF	18	17
(Chinese Taipei) Lin C-y	21	22
(France) T J Popov	11	20
(Singapore) Loh K Y	15	19
2	(Indonesia) A S Ginting	21	21

Second round
(China) Zhao JP	21	21
(Denmark) R Gemke	13	14
(Chinese Taipei) Lin C-y	21	21
2	(Indonesia) A S Ginting	18	17

Quarter-finals
(China) Zhao JP	18	21	21
(Chinese Taipei) Lin C-y	21	17	15

== Women's singles ==
=== Seeds ===
1. (South Korea) An Se-young (second round)
2. (Japan) Akane Yamaguchi (withdrew)
3. (China) Chen Yufei (champion)
4. (Chinese Taipei) Tai Tzu-ying (second round)
5. (Spain) Carolina Marín (first round)
6. (China) He Bingjiao (quarter-finals)
7. (Indonesia) Gregoria Mariska Tunjung (second round)
8. (China) Han Yue (final)

=== Finals ===
Semi-finals
(China) Wang Zhiyi	14	18
8	(China) Han Yue	21	21
3	(China) Chen Yufei	21	21
(South Korea) Kim Ga-eun	16	15

Final
8	(China) Han Yue	21	4	0^{r}
3	(China) Chen Yufei	18	21	0

=== Top half ===
==== Section 1 ====
First round
1	(South Korea) An S-y	21	21
(Thailand) L Chaiwan	16	11
(Chinese Taipei) Pai Y-p	13	11
(China) Wang ZY	21	21
7	(Indonesia) G M Tunjung	21	21
(Thailand) B Ongbamrungphan	16	10
(Chinese Taipei) Hsu W-c	13	22	14
(Japan) N Okuhara	21	20	21

Second round
1	(South Korea) An S-y	12	16
(China) Wang ZY	21	21
7	(Indonesia) G M Tunjung	12	21	16
(Japan) N Okuhara	21	15	21

Quarter-finals
(China) Wang ZY	21	11	21
(Japan) N Okuhara	13	21	8

==== Section 2 ====
First round
4	(Chinese Taipei) Tai T-y	21	21
(Thailand) S Katethong	17	13
(China) Zhang YM	21	21
(India) A Kashyap	12	14
8	(China) Han Y	21	21
(Spain) C Azurmendi	16	13
(Singapore) Yeo J M	21	11
(Belgium) L Tan	9	7^{r}

Second round
4	(Chinese Taipei) Tai T-y	21	19	8^{r}
(China) Zhang YM	18	21	11
8	(China) Han Y	21	16	21
(Singapore) Yeo J M	17	21	18

Quarter-finals
(China) Zhang YM	5	21	17
8	(China) Han Y	21	19	21

=== Bottom half ===
==== Section 3 ====
First round
(Myanmar) Thet Htar T	13	17
(Germany) Y Li	21	21
(Scotland) K Gilmour	18	13
6	(China) He BJ	21	21
PFR	(Estonia) K Kuuba	11	17
(Malaysia) Goh J W	21	21
(China) Gao FJ	14	13
3	(China) Chen YF	21	21

Second round
(Germany) Y Li
6	(China) He BJ	w	/	o
(Malaysia) Goh J W	9	16
3	(China) Chen YF	21	21

Quarter-finals
6	(China) He BJ	22	14	4^{r}
3	(China) Chen YF	20	21	5

==== Section 4 ====
First round
PFR	(Chinese Taipei) Yu C-h	14	14
(Denmark) L Kjærsfeldt	21	21
(Vietnam) Nguyễn T L	10	21	21
5	(Spain) C Marín	21	19	15
(South Korea) Kim G-e	25	21
(Chinese Taipei) Sung S-y	23	11
(Japan) A Ohori	21	21
PFR	(Chinese Taipei) Lin H-t	17	18

Second round
(Denmark) L Kjærsfeldt	20	12
(Vietnam) Nguyễn T L	22	21
(South Korea) Kim G-e	21	21
(Japan) A Ohori	10	18

Quarter-finals
(Vietnam) Nguyễn T L	19	10
(South Korea) Kim G-e	21	21

== Men's doubles ==
=== Seeds ===
1. (India) Satwiksairaj Rankireddy / Chirag Shetty (final)
2. (China) Liang Weikeng / Wang Chang (champions)
3. (Malaysia) Aaron Chia / Soh Wooi Yik (second round)
4. (Indonesia) Fajar Alfian / Muhammad Rian Ardianto (second round)
5. (South Korea) Kang Min-hyuk / Seo Seung-jae (first round)
6. (Denmark) Kim Astrup / Anders Skaarup Rasmussen (second round)
7. (Japan) Takuro Hoki / Yugo Kobayashi (withdrew)
8. (China) Liu Yuchen / Ou Xuanyi (quarter-finals)

=== Finals ===
Semi-finals
1	(India) Satwiksairaj Rankireddy (India) Chirag Shetty	21	22
(China) He Jiting (China) Ren Xiangyu	15	20
(China) Chen Boyang (China) Liu Yi	17	21	15
2	(China) Liang Weikeng (China) Wang Chang	21	14	21

Final
1	(India) Satwiksairaj Rankireddy (India) Chirag Shetty	19	21	19
2	(China) Liang Weikeng (China) Wang Chang	21	18	21

=== Top half ===
==== Section 1 ====
First round
1	(India) S Rankireddy (India) C Shetty	21	21
(England) B Lane (England) S Vendy	13	10
(Malaysia) Goh S F (Malaysia) N Izzuddin	23	22	19
(Japan) A Koga (Japan) T Saito	21	24	21
6	(Denmark) K Astrup (Denmark) A S Rasmussen	23	21	21
(Chinese Taipei) Chang K-c (Chinese Taipei) Po L-w	25	19	16
(France) L Corvée (France) R Labar	14	13
(Indonesia) L R Carnando (Indonesia) D Marthin	21	21

Second round
1	(India) S Rankireddy (India) C Shetty	21	21
(Japan) A Koga (Japan) T Saito	15	16
6	(Denmark) K Astrup (Denmark) A S Rasmussen	18	21	11
(Indonesia) L R Carnando (Indonesia) D Marthin	21	16	21

Quarter-finals
1	(India) S Rankireddy (India) C Shetty	21	21
(Indonesia) L R Carnando (Indonesia) D Marthin	16	14

==== Section 2 ====
First round
3	(Malaysia) A Chia (Malaysia) Soh W Y	21	21
(Malaysia) Ong Y S (Malaysia) Teo E Y	15	15
(China) Tan Q (China) Zhou HD	15	10
(China) He JT (China) Ren XY	21	21
8	(China) Liu YC (China) Ou XY	21	21
(Indonesia) M S Fikri (Indonesia) B Maulana	18	17
(Malaysia) Man W C (Malaysia) Tee K W	11	21	21
(South Korea) Jin Y (South Korea) Na S-s	21	15	17

Second round
3	(Malaysia) A Chia (Malaysia) Soh W Y	25	21	17
(China) He JT (China) Ren XY	27	18	21
8	(China) Liu YC (China) Ou XY	17	21	21
(Malaysia) Man W C (Malaysia) Tee K W	21	11	13

Quarter-finals
(China) He JT (China) Ren XY	21	21
8	(China) Liu YC (China) Ou XY	15	15

=== Bottom half ===
==== Section 3 ====
First round
(Denmark) R Kjær (Denmark) F Søgaard	21	21
(Chinese Taipei) Lu C-y (Chinese Taipei) Yang P-ha	13	18
(Indonesia) P Kusumawardana (Indonesia) Y Rambitan	w	/	o
7	(Japan) T Hoki (Japan) Y Kobayashi
(Chinese Taipei) Lee J-h (Chinese Taipei) Yang P-hs	16	15
(China) Chen BY (China) Liu Y	21	21
(Japan) K Matsui (Japan) Y Takeuchi	20	19
4	(Indonesia) F Alfian (Indonesia) M R Ardianto	22	21

Second round
(Denmark) R Kjær (Denmark) F Søgaard	18	16
(Indonesia) P Kusumawardana (Indonesia) Y Rambitan	21	21
(China) Chen BY (China) Liu Y	21	21
4	(Indonesia) F Alfian (Indonesia) M R Ardianto	11	16

Quarter-finals
(Indonesia) P Kusumawardana (Indonesia) Y Rambitan	19	19
(China) Chen BY (China) Liu Y	21	21

==== Section 4 ====
First round
(Germany) M Lamsfuß (Germany) M Seidel	21	21
(Chinese Taipei) Lee F-c (Chinese Taipei) Lee F-j	14	15
(Chinese Taipei) Lee Y (Chinese Taipei) Wang C-l	23	19	21
5	(South Korea) Kang M-h (South Korea) Seo S-j	21	21	17
PFR	(France) C Popov (France) T J Popov	11	19
(Indonesia) M Ahsan (Indonesia) H Setiawan	21	21
(Thailand) S Jomkoh (Thailand) K Kedren	16	16
2	(China) Liang WK (China) Wang C	21	21

Second round
(Germany) M Lamsfuß (Germany) M Seidel	14	15
(Chinese Taipei) Lee Y (Chinese Taipei) Wang C-l	21	21
(Indonesia) M Ahsan (Indonesia) H Setiawan	17	17
2	(China) Liang WK (China) Wang C	21	21

Quarter-finals
(Chinese Taipei) Lee Y (Chinese Taipei) Wang C-l	21	13	15
2	(China) Liang WK (China) Wang C	17	21	21

== Women's doubles ==
=== Seeds ===
1. (China) Chen Qingchen / Jia Yifan (semi-finals)
2. (South Korea) Baek Ha-na / Lee So-hee (quarter-finals)
3. (South Korea) Kim So-yeong / Kong Hee-yong (first round)
4. (Japan) Yuki Fukushima / Sayaka Hirota (final)
5. (Japan) Nami Matsuyama / Chiharu Shida (champions)
6. (Japan) Mayu Matsumoto / Wakana Nagahara (quarter-finals)
7. (China) Zhang Shuxian / Zheng Yu (quarter-finals)
8. (Indonesia) Apriyani Rahayu / Siti Fadia Silva Ramadhanti (second round)

=== Finals ===
Semi-finals
1	(China) Chen Qingchen (China) Jia Yifan	21	16	15
4	(Japan) Yuki Fukushima (Japan) Sayaka Hirota	14	21	21
(South Korea) Jeong Na-eun (South Korea) Kim Hye-jeong	13	20
5	(Japan) Nami Matsuyama (Japan) Chiharu Shida	21	22

Final
4	(Japan) Yuki Fukushima (Japan) Sayaka Hirota	18	11
5	(Japan) Nami Matsuyama (Japan) Chiharu Shida	21	21

=== Top half ===
==== Section 1 ====
First round
1	(China) Chen QC (China) Jia YF	21	21
(Chinese Taipei) Hsu Y-c (Chinese Taipei) Lin W-c	13	13
(South Korea) Lee Y-l (South Korea) Shin S-c	21	21
(Germany) L Efler (Germany) I Lohau	13	16
8	(Indonesia) A Rahayu (Indonesia) S F S Ramadhanti	w	/	o
(Indonesia) F D Kusuma (Indonesia) A C Pratiwi
(France) M Lambert (France) A Tran	12	21	21
(United States) F Corbett (United States) A Lee	21	15	19

Second round
1	(China) Chen QC (China) Jia YF	21	21
(South Korea) Lee Y-l (South Korea) Shin S-c	16	11
8	(Indonesia) A Rahayu (Indonesia) S F S Ramadhanti	9^{r}
(France) M Lambert (France) A Tran	16

Quarter-finals
1	(China) Chen QC (China) Jia YF	21	21
(France) M Lambert (France) A Tran	9	17

==== Section 2 ====
First round
4	(Japan) Y Fukushima (Japan) S Hirota	21	21
(China) Keng SL (China) Zhang C	15	7
(Japan) R Iwanaga (Japan) K Nakanishi	21	21
PFR	(Chinese Taipei) Sung S-y (Chinese Taipei) Yu C-h	9	11
7	(China) Zhang SX (China) Zheng Y	21	21
PFR	(India) R Panda (India) S Panda	15	9
(China) Li YJ (China) Luo XM	w	/	o
(Malaysia) A Cheong (Malaysia) Teoh M X

Second round
4	(Japan) Y Fukushima (Japan) S Hirota	21	21
(Japan) R Iwanaga (Japan) K Nakanishi	12	17
7	(China) Zhang SX (China) Zheng Y	21	21
(China) Li YJ (China) Luo XM	11	11

Quarter-finals
4	(Japan) Y Fukushima (Japan) S Hirota	24	21
7	(China) Zhang SX (China) Zheng Y	22	13

=== Bottom half ===
==== Section 3 ====
First round
(Thailand) B Aimsaard (Thailand) N Aimsaard	21	21
(Malaysia) V Hoo (Malaysia) Lim C S	16	12
(Chinese Taipei) Lee C-h (Chinese Taipei) Teng C-h	11	12
6	(Japan) M Matsumoto (Japan) W Nagahara	21	21
(South Korea) Jeong N-e (South Korea) Kim H-j	21	15	22
(Malaysia) P Tan (Malaysia) Thinaah M	11	21	20
(Japan) R Miyaura (Japan) A Sakuramoto	21	21
3	(South Korea) Kim S-y (South Korea) Kong H-y	12	17

Second round
(Thailand) B Aimsaard (Thailand) N Aimsaard	11	11
6	(Japan) M Matsumoto (Japan) W Nagahara	21	21
(South Korea) Jeong N-e (South Korea) Kim H-j	21	21
(Japan) R Miyaura (Japan) A Sakuramoto	17	13

Quarter-finals
6	(Japan) M Matsumoto (Japan) W Nagahara	21	17	17
(South Korea) Jeong N-e (South Korea) Kim H-j	15	21	21

==== Section 4 ====
First round
(Scotland) J MacPherson (Scotland) C Torrance	6	7
(China) Liu SS (China) Tan N	21	21
(Thailand) J Kititharakul (Thailand) R Prajongjai	15	10
5	(Japan) N Matsuyama (Japan) C Shida	21	21
(Chinese Taipei) Chang C-h (Chinese Taipei) Yang C-t	18	17
(China) Li WM (China) Liu XX	21	21
(Hong Kong) Yeung N T (Hong Kong) Yeung P L	10	12
2	(South Korea) Baek H-n (South Korea) Lee S-h	21	21

Second round
(China) Liu SS (China) Tan N	14	19
5	(Japan) N Matsuyama (Japan) C Shida	21	21
(China) Li WM (China) Liu XX	21	16
2	(South Korea) Baek H-n (South Korea) Lee S-h	23	21

Quarter-finals
5	(Japan) N Matsuyama (Japan) C Shida	21	21
2	(South Korea) Baek H-n (South Korea) Lee S-h	16	17

== Mixed doubles ==
=== Seeds ===
1. (China) Zheng Siwei / Huang Yaqiong (champions)
2. (Japan) Yuta Watanabe / Arisa Higashino (first round)
3. (China) Feng Yanzhe / Huang Dongping (semi-finals)
4. (South Korea) Seo Seung-jae / Chae Yoo-jung (final)
5. (Thailand) Dechapol Puavaranukroh / Sapsiree Taerattanachai (quarter-finals)
6. (China) Jiang Zhenbang / Wei Yaxin (quarter-finals)
7. (South Korea) Kim Won-ho / Jeong Na-eun (quarter-finals)
8. (France) Thom Gicquel / Delphine Delrue (withdrew)

=== Finals ===
Semi-finals
1	(China) Zheng Siwei (China) Huang Yaqiong	21	21
3	(China) Feng Yanzhe (China) Huang Dongping	16	13
4	(South Korea) Seo Seung-jae (South Korea) Chae Yoo-jung	21	21
(Hong Kong) Tang Chun Man (Hong Kong) Tse Ying Suet	17	13

Final
1	(China) Zheng Siwei (China) Huang Yaqiong	21	21
4	(South Korea) Seo Seung-jae (South Korea) Chae Yoo-jung	10	11

=== Top half ===
==== Section 1 ====
First round
1	(China) Zheng SW (China) Huang YQ	21	21
(Denmark) M Christiansen (Denmark) A Bøje	15	18
(Japan) H Midorikawa (Japan) N Saito	12	21	19
(Japan) K Yamashita (Japan) N Shinoya	21	18	21
6	(China) Jiang ZB (China) Wei YX	21	14	21
PFR	(Chinese Taipei) Lee J-h (Chinese Taipei) Hsu Y-c	12	21	9
(Malaysia) Chen T J (Malaysia) Toh E W	18	18
(Indonesia) R Rivaldy (Indonesia) P H Mentari	21	21

Second round
1	(China) Zheng SW (China) Huang YQ	21	21
(Japan) K Yamashita (Japan) N Shinoya	17	13
6	(China) Jiang ZB (China) Wei YX	21	21
(Indonesia) R Rivaldy (Indonesia) P H Mentari	15	15

Quarter-finals
1	(China) Zheng SW (China) Huang YQ	21	21
6	(China) Jiang ZB (China) Wei YX	12	6

==== Section 2 ====
First round
3	(China) Feng YZ (China) Huang DP	21	21
(Indonesia) R N Kusharjanto (Indonesia) L A Kusumawati	17	16
(Chinese Taipei) Yang P-h (Chinese Taipei) Hu L-f	21	21
(Scotland) A Hall (Scotland) J MacPherson	12	13
7	(South Korea) Kim W-h (South Korea) Jeong N-e	21	21
(England) M Ellis (England) L Smith	11	16
(Indonesia) D Ferdinansyah (Indonesia) G E Widjaja	13	21	21
(Thailand) S Jomkoh (Thailand) S Paewsampran	21	17	16

Second round
3	(China) Feng YZ (China) Huang DP	21	21
(Chinese Taipei) Yang P-h (Chinese Taipei) Hu L-f	10	7
7	(South Korea) Kim W-h (South Korea) Jeong N-e	21	21
(Indonesia) D Ferdinansyah (Indonesia) G E Widjaja	15	18

Quarter-finals
3	(China) Feng YZ (China) Huang DP	21	22
7	(South Korea) Kim W-h (South Korea) Jeong N-e	16	20

=== Bottom half ===
==== Section 3 ====
First round
(Indonesia) P Jordan (Indonesia) M D Oktavianti	11	13
(Japan) Y Kaneko (Japan) M Matsutomo	21	21
(China) Cheng X (China) Chen FH	21	21
PFR	(Algeria) K Mammeri (Algeria) T Mammeri	9	12
(Singapore) T Hee (Singapore) J Tan	21	23
(Malaysia) Tan K M (Malaysia) Lai P J	16	21
(Netherlands) R Tabeling (Netherlands) S Piek	19	15
4	(South Korea) Seo S-j (South Korea) Chae Y-j	21	21

Second round
(Japan) Y Kaneko (Japan) M Matsutomo	16	21	22
(China) Cheng X (China) Chen FH	21	18	24
(Singapore) T Hee (Singapore) J Tan	9	25	19
4	(South Korea) Seo S-j (South Korea) Chae Y-j	21	23	21

Quarter-finals
(China) Cheng X (China) Chen FH	21	18	17
4	(South Korea) Seo S-j (South Korea) Chae Y-j	16	21	21

==== Section 4 ====
First round
(Hong Kong) Lee C H (Hong Kong) Ng T Y	21	21
(Chinese Taipei) Chang K-c (Chinese Taipei) Lee C-c	18	14
(Germany) M Lamsfuß (Germany) I Lohau	17	13
5	(Thailand) D Puavaranukroh (Thailand) S Taerattanachai	21	21
(Hong Kong) Tang C M (Hong Kong) Tse Y S	21	22
(Malaysia) Goh S H (Malaysia) S J Lai	17	20
(Chinese Taipei) Ye H-w (Chinese Taipei) Lee C-h	21	21
2	(Japan) Y Watanabe (Japan) A Higashino	15	14

Second round
(Hong Kong) Lee C H (Hong Kong) Ng T Y	21	18	8
5	(Thailand) D Puavaranukroh (Thailand) S Taerattanachai	14	21	21
(Hong Kong) Tang C M (Hong Kong) Tse Y S	15	21	21
(Chinese Taipei) Ye H-w (Chinese Taipei) Lee C-h	21	11	13

Quarter-finals
5	(Thailand) D Puavaranukroh (Thailand) S Taerattanachai	12	12
(Hong Kong) Tang C M (Hong Kong) Tse Y S	21	21

Preceded by 2023 Japan Masters	BWF World Tour; 2023 BWF season	Succeeded by 2023 Syed Modi International
