= 2023 Malaysia Masters =

Badminton tournament in Malaysia

Tournament details
- Dates: 23–28 May
- Level: Super 500
- Total prize money: US$420,000
- Venue: Axiata Arena
- Location: Kuala Lumpur, Malaysia

Champions
- Men's singles: (India) Prannoy H. S.
- Women's singles: (Japan) Akane Yamaguchi
- Men's doubles: (South Korea) Kang Min-hyuk (South Korea) Seo Seung-jae
- Women's doubles: (South Korea) Baek Ha-na (South Korea) Lee So-hee
- Mixed doubles: (Thailand) Dechapol Puavaranukroh (Thailand) Sapsiree Taerattanachai

The 2023 Malaysia Masters (officially known as the Perodua Malaysia Masters 2023 presented by Daihatsu for sponsorship reasons) was a badminton tournament that took place at the Axiata Arena, Kuala Lumpur, Malaysia, from 23 to 28 May 2023 and had a total prize of US$420,000.

== Tournament ==
The 2023 Malaysia Masters was the eleventh tournament of the 2023 BWF World Tour and was part of the Malaysia Masters championships, which had been held since 2009. This tournament was organized by the Badminton Association of Malaysia with sanction from the BWF.

=== Venue ===
This international tournament was held at the Axiata Arena inside the KL Sports City in Kuala Lumpur, Malaysia.

=== Point distribution ===
Below is the point distribution table for each phase of the tournament based on the BWF points system for the BWF World Tour Super 500 event.

Winner	Runner-up	3/4	5/8	9/16	17/32	33/64	65/128
9,200	7,800	6,420	5,040	3,600	2,220	880	430

=== Prize pool ===
The total prize money was US$420,000 with the distribution of the prize money in accordance with BWF regulations.

Event	Winner	Finalist	Semi-finals	Quarter-finals	Last 16
Singles	$31,500	$15,960	$6,090	$2,520	$1,470
Doubles	$33,180	$15,960	$5,880	$3,045	$1,575

== Men's singles ==
=== Seeds ===
1. (Denmark) Viktor Axelsen (withdrew)
2. (Indonesia) Anthony Sinisuka Ginting (Second Round)
3. (Indonesia) Jonatan Christie (Second Round)
4. (Malaysia) Lee Zii Jia (Second Round)
5. (Japan) Kodai Naraoka (Quarter-finals)
6. (Chinese Taipei) Chou Tien-chen (First Round)
7. (Singapore) Loh Kean Yew (First Round)
8. (Thailand) Kunlavut Vitidsarn (Second Round)

=== Finals ===
Semi-finals
Q2	(Indonesia) Christian Adinata	17^{r}
(India) Prannoy H. S.	19
(Chinese Taipei) Lin Chun-yi	13	19
(China) Weng Hongyang	21	21

Final
(India) Prannoy H. S.	21	13	21
(China) Weng Hongyang	19	21	18

=== Top half ===
==== Section 1 ====
First round
PFQ	(Thailand) S Thammasin	22	10	9
PFQ	(Denmark) M Johannesen	20	21	21
PFQ	(Thailand) K Wangcharoen	16	17
Q2	(Indonesia) C Adinata	21	21
8	(Thailand) K Vitidsarn	21	21
(Japan) K Tsuneyama	16	19
(India) S Kidambi	21	21
(France) T J Popov	12	16

Second round
PFQ	(Denmark) M Johannesen	16	14
Q2	(Indonesia) C Adinata	21	21
8	(Thailand) K Vitidsarn	19	19
(India) S Kidambi	21	21

Quarter-finals
Q2	(Indonesia) C Adinata	16	21	21
(India) S Kidambi	21	16	11

==== Section 2 ====
First round
3	(Indonesia) J Christie	16	21	21
Q1	(Chinese Taipei) Chi Y-j	21	18	16
(Japan) K Nishimoto	17	21	21
(Malaysia) Ng T Y	21	16	13
6	(Chinese Taipei) Chou T-c	21	14	13
(India) Prannoy H. S.	16	21	21
(China) Li SF	21	21
(Hong Kong) Lee C Y	18	15

Second round
3	(Indonesia) J Christie	20	11
(Japan) K Nishimoto	22	21
(India) Prannoy H. S.	13	21	21
(China) Li SF	21	16	11

Quarter-finals
(Japan) K Nishimoto	23	21	13
(India) Prannoy H. S.	25	18	21

=== Bottom half ===
==== Section 3 ====
First round
(Denmark) R Gemke	16	28	21
Q3	(South Korea) Jeon H-j	21	26	11
Q4	(Chinese Taipei) Lee C-h	18	11
5	(Japan) K Naraoka	21	21
(Chinese Taipei) Lin C-y	13	21	21
(Indonesia) C A Dwi Wardoyo	21	16	8
(China) Lu GZ	12	19
4	(Malaysia) Lee Z J	21	21

Second round
(Denmark) R Gemke	14	15
5	(Japan) K Naraoka	21	21
(Chinese Taipei) Lin C-y	21	16	21
4	(Malaysia) Lee Z J	19	21	15

Quarter-finals
5	(Japan) K Naraoka	21	29	19
(Chinese Taipei) Lin C-y	17	30	21

==== Section 4 ====
First round
(Hong Kong) Ng K L	21	18	21
PFQ	(Republic of Ireland) N Nguyen	11	21	13
(India) L Sen	21	16	21
7	(Singapore) Loh K Y	10	21	9
(Japan) K Momota	21	21	16
(China) Weng HY	13	23	21
(Chinese Taipei) Wang T-w	14	16
2	(Indonesia) A S Ginting	21	21

Second round
(Hong Kong) Ng K L	21	21
(India) L Sen	14	19
(China) Weng HY	21	21
2	(Indonesia) A S Ginting	19	15

Quarter-finals
(Hong Kong) Ng K L	21	21	14
(China) Weng HY	23	14	21

== Women's singles ==
=== Seeds ===
1. (Japan) Akane Yamaguchi (Champion)
2. (China) Wang Zhiyi (Quarter-finals)
3. (Thailand) Ratchanok Intanon (First Round)
4. (China) Han Yue (Semi-finals)
5. (Thailand) Pornpawee Chochuwong (Second Round)
6. (India) P. V. Sindhu (Semi-finals)
7. (Indonesia) Gregoria Mariska Tunjung (final)
8. (Thailand) Busanan Ongbamrungphan (Quarter-finals)

=== Finals ===
Semi-finals
1	(Japan) Akane Yamaguchi	21	21
4	(China) Han Yue	10	17
6	(India) P. V. Sindhu	14	17
7	(Indonesia) Gregoria Mariska Tunjung	21	21

Final
1	(Japan) Akane Yamaguchi	21	21
7	(Indonesia) Gregoria Mariska Tunjung	17	7

=== Top half ===
==== Section 1 ====
First round
1	(Japan) A Yamaguchi	21	21
PFQ	(India) A Kashyap	17	12
(United States) I Wang	5	15
(Denmark) M Blichfeldt	21	21
5	(Thailand) P Chochuwong	22	21
(Chinese Taipei) Sung S-y	20	15
(Singapore) Yeo J M	19	21	9
(Canada) M Li	21	13	21

Second round
1	(Japan) A Yamaguchi	21	21
(Denmark) M Blichfeldt	18	17
5	(Thailand) P Chochuwong	15	13
(Canada) M Li	21	21

Quarter-finals
1	(Japan) A Yamaguchi	21	21
(Canada) M Li	11	14

==== Section 2 ====
First round
4	(China) Han Y	21	21
Q4	(India) A Chaliha	17	7
(Chinese Taipei) Hsu W-c	25	17	21
(Japan) S Kawakami	23	21	13
8	(Thailand) B Ongbamrungphan	21	21
Q3	(Myanmar) Thet Htar T	12	8
(Germany) Y Li	21	17	21
(Malaysia) Goh J W	17	21	15

Second round
4	(China) Han Y	21	21
(Chinese Taipei) Hsu W-c	16	18
8	(Thailand) B Ongbamrungphan	19	21	21
(Germany) Y Li	21	13	16

Quarter-finals
4	(China) Han Y	22	21
8	(Thailand) B Ongbamrungphan	20	9

=== Bottom half ===
==== Section 3 ====
First round
(Japan) A Ohori	w	/	o
(Thailand) L Chaiwan
(Denmark) L Christophersen	13	21	18
6	(India) P. V. Sindhu	21	17	21
(United States) B Zhang	15	13
(China) Zhang YM	21	21
(South Korea) Kim G-e	15	21	21
3	(Thailand) R Intanon	21	14	18

Second round
(Japan) A Ohori	16	11
6	(India) P. V. Sindhu	21	21
(China) Zhang YM	16	21	21
(South Korea) Kim G-e	21	15	18

Quarter-finals
6	(India) P. V. Sindhu	21	13	22
(China) Zhang YM	16	21	20

==== Section 4 ====
First round
Q2	(South Korea) Sim Y-j	21	21
PFQ	(Belgium) L Tan	14	7
(Chinese Taipei) Pai Y-p	19	12
7	(Indonesia) G M Tunjung	21	21
(Denmark) L Kjærsfeldt	10	21	21
PFQ	(Indonesia) P K Wardani	21	14	7
Q1	(India) M Bansod	11	13
2	(China) Wang ZY	21	21

Second round
Q2	(South Korea) Sim Y-j	15	19
7	(Indonesia) G M Tunjung	21	21
(Denmark) L Kjærsfeldt	18	20
2	(China) Wang ZY	21	22

Quarter-finals
7	(Indonesia) G M Tunjung	21	21
2	(China) Wang ZY	11	14

== Men's doubles ==
=== Seeds ===
1. (Indonesia) Fajar Alfian / Muhammad Rian Ardianto (First Round)
2. (Malaysia) Aaron Chia / Soh Wooi Yik (Quarter-finals)
3. (Indonesia) Mohammad Ahsan / Hendra Setiawan (Quarter-finals)
4. (Japan) Takuro Hoki / Yugo Kobayashi (Semi-finals)
5. (India) Satwiksairaj Rankireddy / Chirag Shetty (withdrew)
6. (Malaysia) Ong Yew Sin / Teo Ee Yi (Quarter-finals)
7. (Denmark) Kim Astrup / Anders Skaarup Rasmussen (First Round)
8. (Indonesia) Leo Rolly Carnando / Daniel Marthin (Semi-finals)

=== Finals ===
Semi-finals
(South Korea) Kang Min-hyuk (South Korea) Seo Seung-jae	21	12	21
4	(Japan) Takuro Hoki (Japan) Yugo Kobayashi	18	21	16
(Malaysia) Man Wei Chong (Malaysia) Tee Kai Wun	21	22
8	(Indonesia) Leo Rolly Carnando (Indonesia) Daniel Marthin	17	20

Final
(South Korea) Kang Min-hyuk (South Korea) Seo Seung-jae	21	22	21
(Malaysia) Man Wei Chong (Malaysia) Tee Kai Wun	15	24	19

=== Top half ===
==== Section 1 ====
First round
1	(Indonesia) F Alfian (Indonesia) M R Ardianto	16	19
(South Korea) Kang M-h (South Korea) Seo S-j	21	21
(Chinese Taipei) Su C-h (Chinese Taipei) Ye H-w	21	18	14
(Japan) A Koga (Japan) T Saito	18	21	21
6	(Malaysia) Ong Y S (Malaysia) Teo E Y	21	21
(China) Ren XY (China) Tan Q	16	18
(Netherlands) R Jille (Netherlands) T Van Der Lecq	17	15
(Chinese Taipei) Lu C-y (Chinese Taipei) Yang P-h	21	21

Second round
(South Korea) Kang M-h (South Korea) Seo S-j	21	21
(Japan) A Koga (Japan) T Saito	15	17
6	(Malaysia) Ong Y S (Malaysia) Teo E Y	15	21	21
(Chinese Taipei) Lu C-y (Chinese Taipei) Yang P-h	21	12	19

Quarter-finals
(South Korea) Kang M-h (South Korea) Seo S-j	15	21	21
6	(Malaysia) Ong Y S (Malaysia) Teo E Y	21	16	14

==== Section 2 ====
First round
4	(Japan) T Hoki (Japan) Y Kobayashi	21	21
(Thailand) S Jomkoh (Thailand) K Kedren	15	13
Q2	(Thailand) P Kaosamaang (Thailand) W Thongsa-nga	11	9
(Indonesia) M F Gideon (Indonesia) K S Sukamuljo	21	21
PFQ	(Chinese Taipei) Lee F-c (Chinese Taipei) Lee F-j	23	21
(England) B Lane (England) S Vendy	21	18
(Chinese Taipei) Chang K-c (Chinese Taipei) Po L-w	21	21
Q1	(Canada) A Dong (Canada) N Yakura	13	19

Second round
4	(Japan) T Hoki (Japan) Y Kobayashi	21	21
(Indonesia) M F Gideon (Indonesia) K S Sukamuljo	15	17
PFQ	(Chinese Taipei) Lee F-c (Chinese Taipei) Lee F-j	19	20
(Chinese Taipei) Chang K-c (Chinese Taipei) Po L-w	21	22

Quarter-finals
4	(Japan) T Hoki (Japan) Y Kobayashi	21	21
(Chinese Taipei) Chang K-c (Chinese Taipei) Po L-w	18	16

=== Bottom half ===
==== Section 3 ====
First round
(Scotland) A Dunn (Scotland) A Hall	21	21	21
Q4	(Malaysia) Tan K M (Malaysia) Tan W K	23	14	16
(Malaysia) Man W C (Malaysia) Tee K W	25	21
7	(Denmark) K Astrup (Denmark) A S Rasmussen	23	16
(Chinese Taipei) Lee J-h (Chinese Taipei) Yang P-h	16	21	21
(Japan) K Matsui (Japan) Y Takeuchi	21	11	17
Q3	(Chinese Taipei) Chiu H-c (Chinese Taipei) Yang M-t	18	14
3	(Indonesia) M Ahsan (Indonesia) H Setiawan	21	21

Second round
(Scotland) A Dunn (Scotland) A Hall	21	16	13
(Malaysia) Man W C (Malaysia) Tee K W	19	21	21
(Chinese Taipei) Lee J-h (Chinese Taipei) Yang P-h	17	14
3	(Indonesia) M Ahsan (Indonesia) H Setiawan	21	21

Quarter-finals
(Malaysia) Man W C (Malaysia) Tee K W	23	21
3	(Indonesia) M Ahsan (Indonesia) H Setiawan	21	17

==== Section 4 ====
First round
(China) He JT (China) Zhou HD	7
(Chinese Taipei) Lee Y (Chinese Taipei) Wang C-l	2^{r}
(Japan) A Endo (Japan) Y Takei	22	10
8	(Indonesia) L R Carnando (Indonesia) D Marthin	24	21
(France) C Popov (France) T J Popov	22	10
(South Korea) Choi S-g (South Korea) Kim W-h	24	21
(Indonesia) P Kusumawardana (Indonesia) Y Rambitan	18	21	21
2	(Malaysia) A Chia (Malaysia) Soh W Y	21	10	23

Second round
(China) He JT (China) Zhou HD	14	13
8	(Indonesia) L R Carnando (Indonesia) D Marthin	21	21
(South Korea) Choi S-g (South Korea) Kim W-h	19	14
2	(Malaysia) A Chia (Malaysia) Soh W Y	21	21

Quarter-finals
8	(Indonesia) L R Carnando (Indonesia) D Marthin	21	21
2	(Malaysia) A Chia (Malaysia) Soh W Y	18	19

== Women's doubles ==
=== Seeds ===
1. (Japan) Nami Matsuyama / Chiharu Shida (Quarter-finals)
2. (Indonesia) Apriyani Rahayu / Siti Fadia Silva Ramadhanti (Quarter-finals)
3. (South Korea) Kim So-yeong / Kong Hee-yong (Second Round)
4. (Japan) Yuki Fukushima / Sayaka Hirota (Quarter-finals)
5. (South Korea) Jeong Na-eun / Kim Hye-jeong (Semi-finals)
6. (Malaysia) Pearly Tan / Thinaah Muralitharan (Finals)
7. (Japan) Mayu Matsumoto / Wakana Nagahara (Semi-finals)
8. (Thailand) Jongkolphan Kititharakul / Rawinda Prajongjai (First Round)

=== Finals ===
Semi-finals
(South Korea) Baek Ha-na (South Korea) Lee So-hee	21	21
7	(Japan) Mayu Matsumoto (Japan) Wakana Nagahara	19	14
6	(Malaysia) Pearly Tan (Malaysia) Thinaah Muralitharan	21	23
5	(South Korea) Jeong Na-eun (South Korea) Kim Hye-jeong	19	21

Final
(South Korea) Baek Ha-na (South Korea) Lee So-hee	22	8	21
6	(Malaysia) Pearly Tan (Malaysia) Thinaah Muralitharan	20	21	17

=== Top half ===
==== Section 1 ====
First round
1	(Japan) N Matsuyama (Japan) C Shida	21	21
Q2	(Germany) S Küspert (Germany) E Moszczynski	19	12
(China) Li WM (China) Liu XX	21	21
Q1	(Chinese Taipei) Chang C-h (Chinese Taipei) Yang C-t	18	8
8	(Thailand) J Kititharakul (Thailand) R Prajongjai	10	21	18
(Japan) R Iwanaga (Japan) K Nakanishi	21	13	21
(South Korea) Baek H-n (South Korea) Lee S-h	21	21
(Indonesia) L T Mayasari (Indonesia) R Sugiarto	19	11

Second round
1	(Japan) N Matsuyama (Japan) C Shida	21	21
(China) Li WM (China) Liu XX	16	12
(Japan) R Iwanaga (Japan) K Nakanishi	14	6
(South Korea) Baek H-n (South Korea) Lee S-h	21	21

Quarter-finals
1	(Japan) N Matsuyama (Japan) C Shida	16	17
(South Korea) Baek H-n (South Korea) Lee S-h	21	21

==== Section 2 ====
First round
3	(South Korea) Kim S-y (South Korea) Kong H-y	21	21
(Netherlands) D Jille (Netherlands) C Seinen	11	10
(Chinese Taipei) Lee C-h (Chinese Taipei) Teng C-h	16	21	9
Q4	(Chinese Taipei) Hsu Y-c (Chinese Taipei) Lin W-c	21	16	21
7	(Japan) M Matsumoto (Japan) W Nagahara	21	21
Q3	(Indonesia) M T Puspita Sari (Indonesia) R A Rose	17	18
(Denmark) M Fruergaard (Denmark) S Thygesen	21	21
(Malaysia) V Hoo (Malaysia) Lim C S	13	18

Second round
3	(South Korea) Kim S-y (South Korea) Kong H-y	16	21	19
Q4	(Chinese Taipei) Hsu Y-c (Chinese Taipei) Lin W-c	21	15	21
7	(Japan) M Matsumoto (Japan) W Nagahara	21	21
(Denmark) M Fruergaard (Denmark) S Thygesen	12	10

Quarter-finals
Q4	(Chinese Taipei) Hsu Y-c (Chinese Taipei) Lin W-c	21	12	16
7	(Japan) M Matsumoto (Japan) W Nagahara	16	21	21

=== Bottom half ===
==== Section 3 ====
First round
(Japan) R Miyaura (Japan) A Sakuramoto	21	21
(England) C Birch (England) L Smith	12	8
(Bulgaria) G Stoeva (Bulgaria) S Stoeva	17	14
6	(Malaysia) P Tan (Malaysia) Thinaah M	21	21
(Indonesia) F D Kusuma (Indonesia) A C Pratiwi	16	14
(South Korea) Lee Y-l (South Korea) Shin S-c	21	21
(Thailand) B Aimsaard (Thailand) N Aimsaard	19	10
4	(Japan) Y Fukushima (Japan) S Hirota	21	21

Second round
(Japan) R Miyaura (Japan) A Sakuramoto	17	21	19
6	(Malaysia) P Tan (Malaysia) Thinaah M	21	18	21
(South Korea) Lee Y-l (South Korea) Shin S-c	16	9
4	(Japan) Y Fukushima (Japan) S Hirota	21	21

Quarter-finals
6	(Malaysia) P Tan (Malaysia) Thinaah M	13	21	21
4	(Japan) Y Fukushima (Japan) S Hirota	21	19	16

==== Section 4 ====
First round
(Japan) R Hirokami (Japan) Y Kato	21	17	21
(Singapore) Jin YJ (Singapore) C Wong	18	21	9
(China) Liu SS (China) Tan N	19	21	13
5	(South Korea) Jeong N-e (South Korea) Kim H-j	21	15	21
(Thailand) S Paewsampran (Thailand) P Supajirakul	21	21
(Canada) C Choi (Canada) J Wu	11	19
(Hong Kong) Yeung N T (Hong Kong) Yeung P L	16	19
2	(Indonesia) A Rahayu (Indonesia) S F S Ramadhanti	21	21

Second round
(Japan) R Hirokami (Japan) Y Kato	15	21	7
5	(South Korea) Jeong N-e (South Korea) Kim H-j	21	9	21
(Thailand) S Paewsampran (Thailand) P Supajirakul	14	14
2	(Indonesia) A Rahayu (Indonesia) S F S Ramadhanti	21	21

Quarter-finals
5	(South Korea) Jeong N-e (South Korea) Kim H-j	21	18	21
2	(Indonesia) A Rahayu (Indonesia) S F S Ramadhanti	15	21	16

== Mixed doubles ==
=== Seeds ===
1. (Japan) Yuta Watanabe / Arisa Higashino (withdrew)
2. (Thailand) Dechapol Puavaranukroh / Sapsiree Taerattanachai (Champions)
3. (South Korea) Seo Seung-jae / Chae Yu-jung (Semi-finals)
4. (China) Feng Yanzhe / Huang Dongping (Finals)
5. (Malaysia) Goh Soon Huat / Shevon Jemie Lai (First Round)
6. (Netherlands) Robin Tabeling / Selena Piek (Second Round)
7. (South Korea) Kim Won-ho / Jeong Na-eun (Second Round)
8. (Indonesia) Rehan Naufal Kusharjanto / Lisa Ayu Kusumawati (Second Round)

=== Finals ===
Semi-finals
(Thailand) Supak Jomkoh (Thailand) Supissara Paewsampran	12	8
4	(China) Feng Yanzhe (China) Huang Dongping	21	21
3	(South Korea) Seo Seung-jae (South Korea) Chae Yoo-jung	19	21	17
2	(Thailand) Dechapol Puavaranukroh (Thailand) Sapsiree Taerattanachai	21	13	21

Final
4	(China) Feng Yanzhe (China) Huang Dongping	21	13	18
2	(Thailand) Dechapol Puavaranukroh (Thailand) Sapsiree Taerattanachai	16	21	21

=== Top half ===
==== Section 1 ====
First round
PFQ	(Scotland) A Hall (Scotland) J MacPherson	24	21
(Indonesia) Z J Sumanti (Indonesia) H Julimarbela	22	19
(Denmark) M Thyrri (Denmark) A Magelund	21	19	17
(England) M Ellis (England) L Smith	19	21	21
8	(Indonesia) R N Kusharjanto (Indonesia) L A Kusumawati	15	21	21
Q3	(Denmark) M Mikkelsen (Denmark) R Søby Hansen	21	11	14
(Malaysia) Tan K M (Malaysia) Lai P J	20	20
(Thailand) S Jomkoh (Thailand) S Paewsampran	22	22

Second round
PFQ	(Scotland) A Hall (Scotland) J MacPherson	16	14
(England) M Ellis (England) L Smith	21	21
8	(Indonesia) R N Kusharjanto (Indonesia) L A Kusumawati	17	15
(Thailand) S Jomkoh (Thailand) S Paewsampran	21	21

Quarter-finals
(England) M Ellis (England) L Smith	21	19	1
(Thailand) S Jomkoh (Thailand) S Paewsampran	10	21	21

==== Section 2 ====
First round
4	(China) Feng YZ (China) Huang DP	21	14	21
Q4	(United States) V Chiu (United States) J Gai	10	21	9
(Chinese Taipei) Ye H-w (Chinese Taipei) Lee C-h	17	11
(Indonesia) D Ferdinansyah (Indonesia) G E Widjaja	21	21
7	(South Korea) Kim W-h (South Korea) Jeong N-e	21	21
Q2	(Malaysia) Chan P S (Malaysia) Cheah Y S	8	15
(Hong Kong) Lee C H (Hong Kong) Ng T Y	14	12
(Japan) K Yamashita (Japan) N Shinoya	21	21

Second round
4	(China) Feng YZ (China) Huang DP	23	21
(Indonesia) D Ferdinansyah (Indonesia) G E Widjaja	21	16
7	(South Korea) Kim W-h (South Korea) Jeong N-e	21	21	22
(Japan) K Yamashita (Japan) N Shinoya	17	23	24

Quarter-finals
4	(China) Feng YZ (China) Huang DP	22	11	21
(Japan) K Yamashita (Japan) N Shinoya	20	21	17

=== Bottom half ===
==== Section 3 ====
First round
(Malaysia) Chen T J (Malaysia) Toh E W	20	21	15
(Indonesia) R Rivaldy (Indonesia) P H Mentari	22	11	21
(Denmark) M Christiansen (Denmark) A Bøje	14	21	19
6	(Netherlands) R Tabeling (Netherlands) S Piek	21	18	21
(Chinese Taipei) Yang P-h (Chinese Taipei) Hu L-f	22	19	21
(Japan) H Midorikawa (Japan) N Saito	20	21	11
(England) G Mairs (England) J Moore	21	8
3	(South Korea) Seo S-j (South Korea) Chae Y-j	23	21

Second round
(Indonesia) R Rivaldy (Indonesia) P H Mentari	21	21
6	(Netherlands) R Tabeling (Netherlands) S Piek	18	19
(Chinese Taipei) Yang P-h (Chinese Taipei) Hu L-f	14	11
3	(South Korea) Seo S-j (South Korea) Chae Y-j	21	21

Quarter-finals
(Indonesia) R Rivaldy (Indonesia) P H Mentari	15	20
3	(South Korea) Seo S-j (South Korea) Chae Y-j	21	22

==== Section 4 ====
First round
Q1	(Chinese Taipei) Lee J-h (Chinese Taipei) Hsu Y-c	14	14
(China) Jiang ZB (China) Wei YX	21	21
(Indonesia) P Jordan (Indonesia) M D Oktavianti	21	18	21
5	(Malaysia) Goh S H (Malaysia) S J Lai	19	21	12
(Japan) Y Kaneko (Japan) M Matsutomo	21	21
(Singapore) T Hee (Singapore) J Tan	18	16
(Hong Kong) Tang C M (Hong Kong) Tse Y S	15	18
2	(Thailand) D Puavaranukroh (Thailand) S Taerattanachai	21	21

Second round
(China) Jiang ZB (China) Wei YX	16	21	21
(Indonesia) P Jordan (Indonesia) M D Oktavianti	21	13	14
(Japan) Y Kaneko (Japan) M Matsutomo	12	21	14
2	(Thailand) D Puavaranukroh (Thailand) S Taerattanachai	21	10	21

Quarter-finals
(China) Jiang ZB (China) Wei YX	8	17
2	(Thailand) D Puavaranukroh (Thailand) S Taerattanachai	21	21

Preceded by 2023 Orléans Masters	BWF World Tour; 2023 BWF season	Succeeded by 2023 Thailand Open
