= 2017 BWF World Junior Championships – Girls' singles =

The girls' singles event of the 2017 BWF World Junior Championships in badminton was held on 16–22 October. The defending champion was Chen Yufei from China.

== Seeds ==
1. (Thailand) Phittayaporn Chaiwan (quarterfinals)
2. (Singapore) Yeo Jia Min (fifth round)
3. (Indonesia) Gregoria Mariska Tunjung (champion)
4. (Malaysia) Goh Jin Wei (semifinals)
5. (China) Han Yue (final)
6. (China) Cai Yanyan (semifinals)
7. (Japan) Asuka Takahashi (fifth round)
8. (India) Aakarshi Kashyap (fourth round)

9. (Thailand) Chasinee Korepap (fifth round)
10. (Thailand) Chananchida Jucharoen (quarter-finals)
11. (Bulgaria) Maria Delcheva (third round)
12. (Hungary) Vivien Sandorhazi (fourth round)
13. (Chinese Taipei) Huang Yin-hsuan (fourth round)
14. (Hungary) Reka Madarasz (second round)
15. (Czech Republic) Tereza Svabikova (third round)
16. (Indonesia) Choirunnisa (fifth round)

Click on the seed number of a player to go to their draw section.

== Draw ==
=== Finals ===
Fifth round
1	(Thailand) Phittayaporn Chaiwan	21	21
(Malaysia) Eoon Qi Xuan	6	8
6	(China) Cai Yanyan	21	21
(India) Gayathri Gopichand	7	11
3	(Indonesia) Gregoria Mariska Tunjung	21	19	21
(China) Wang Zhiyi	18	21	12
(Vietnam) Vu Thi Anh Thu	13	9
(Indonesia) Aurum Oktavia Winata	21	21
10	(Thailand) Chananchida Jucharoen	21	21
7	(Japan) Asuka Takahashi	14	12
16	(Indonesia) Choirunnisa	15	19
4	(Malaysia) Goh Jin Wei	21	21
9	(Thailand) Chasinee Korepap	12	13
5	(China) Han Yue	21	21
(China) Zhou Meng	21	21
2	(Singapore) Yeo Jia Min	16	19

Quarterfinals
1	(Thailand) Phittayaporn Chaiwan	19	21	20
6	(China) Cai Yanyan	21	14	22
3	(Indonesia) Gregoria Mariska Tunjung	21	21
(Indonesia) Aurum Oktavia Winata	10	13
10	(Thailand) Chananchida Jucharoen	12	5
4	(Malaysia) Goh Jin Wei	21	21
5	(China) Han Yue	21	21
(China) Zhou Meng	13	10

Semifinals
6	(China) Cai Yanyan	20	21	18
3	(Indonesia) Gregoria Mariska Tunjung	22	13	21
4	(Malaysia) Goh Jin Wei	9	10
5	(China) Han Yue	21	21

Finals
3	(Indonesia) Gregoria Mariska Tunjung	21	13	24
5	(China) Han Yue	13	21	22

=== Top half ===
==== Section 1 ====
First round

Second round
1	(Thailand) P Chaiwan	21	21
(Netherlands) D Jille	14	12
(Brunei) S Lee	14	17
(Australia) S Lim	21	21
(South Korea) An S-y	21	21
(Scotland) R Sudgen	3	6
(Russia) A Semenova	22	15
(France) L Huet	24	21

Third round
1	(Thailand) P Chaiwan	21	21
(Australia) S Lim	9	10
(South Korea) An S-y	21	21
(France) L Huet	14	9

Fourth round
1	(Thailand) P Chaiwan	22	9	22
(South Korea) An S-y	20	21	20

==== Section 2 ====
First round

Second round
13	(Chinese Taipei) Huang Y-h	21	21
(Hungary) K Szotak	15	14
(Sweden) E Soderstrom	21	18	12
(Hong Kong) Yeung P L	12	21	21
(Armenia) G Mamayanjan	17	5
(Latvia) L Lencevica	21	21
(Georgia (country)) M Khachaturyan	6	2^{r}
(Malaysia) Eoon Q X	21	15

Third round
13	(Chinese Taipei) Huang Y-h	21	21
(Hong Kong) Yeung P L	16	13
(Latvia) L Lencevica	5	11
(Malaysia) Eoon Q X	21	21

Fourth round
13	(Chinese Taipei) Huang Y-h	22	18	12
(Malaysia) Eoon Q X	20	21	21

==== Section 3 ====
First round

Second round
6	(China) Cai YY	21	21
(Myanmar) T H Thuzar	9	14
(Japan) M Hayashi	21	26
(Singapore) N I Khan	13	24
(Hong Kong) Yeung S Y	21	21
(Sri Lanka) H N Ambalangodage	17	7
(Macau) Ao I K	6	14
(Philippines) S J Barredo	21	21

Third round
6	(China) Cai YY	21	15	21
(Japan) M Hayashi	19	21	14
(Hong Kong) Yeung S Y	15	23	7
(Philippines) S J Barredo	21	21	2^{r}

Fourth round
6	(China) Cai YY	21	21
(Hong Kong) Yeung S Y	13	9

==== Section 4 ====
First round
(India) G G Pullela	21	21
(Poland) W Dabczynska	8	12

Second round
15	(Czech Republic) T Svabikova	21	21
(Australia) L Lim	12	12
(Denmark) M Skodstrup	21	20	21
(Spain) S Penalver	18	22	13
(Brazil) J Lima	23	13
(United States) D Gupta	21	21	13
(South Africa) A Bestbier	4	11
(India) G G Pullela	21	21

Third round
15	(Czech Republic) T Svabikova	12	8
(Denmark) M Skodstrup	21	21
(Brazil) J Lima	21	18	11
(India) G G Pullela	15	21	21

Fourth round
(Denmark) M Skodstrup	21	18	17
(India) G G Pullela	19	21	21

==== Section 5 ====
First round

Second round
3	(Indonesia) G M Tunjung	21	21
(Norway) M Christensen	6	4
(Japan) H Mizui	21	21
(Finland) P Lindberg	10	10
(South Korea) Jeong M	21	21
(France) J Moinard	10	20
(Ghana) E Y Migbodzi	6	10
(Germany) A-K Spori	21	21

Third round
3	(Indonesia) G M Tunjung	21	21
(Japan) H Mizui	9	16
(South Korea) Jeong M	21	21
(Germany) A-K Spori	10	18

Fourth round
3	(Indonesia) G M Tunjung	21	21
(South Korea) Jeong M	9	5

==== Section 6 ====
First round
(Canada) T Ng	21	21
(Nepal) J Gurung	7	6

Second round
12	(Hungary) V Sandorhazi	21	25
(England) F Redfearn	18	23
(Japan) Y Suzuki	21	21
(Turkey) N Inci	13	9
(Nepal) T A Ratnayaka	21	21
(Pakistan) A Muneeb	11	12
(China) Wang ZY	21	21
(Canada) T Ng	14	17

Third round
12	(Hungary) V Sandorhazi	15	21	24
(Japan) Y Suzuki	21	15	22
(Nepal) T A Ratnayaka	10	12
(China) Wang ZY	21	21

Fourth round
12	(Hungary) V Sandorhazi	14	18
(China) Wang ZY	21	21

==== Section 7 ====
First round

Second round
8	(India) A Kashyap	21	21
(Egypt) H H Mohamed	9	4
(Czech Republic) L Krpatova	21	21
(Mongolia) G Baatarsuren	3	6
(Belgium) C Lassaux	14	12
(Vietnam) Vu T A T	21	21
(Portugal) C M. Martins	w	/	o
(Algeria) I Ziani

Third round
8	(India) A Kashyap	21	21
(Czech Republic) L Krpatova	13	4
(Vietnam) Vu T A T	21	21
(Portugal) C M. Martins	9	8

Fourth round
8	(India) A Kashyap	16	18
(Vietnam) Vu T A T	21	21

==== Section 8 ====
First round
(El Salvador) C Navas	6	5
(New Zealand) S Fu	21	21

Second round
11	(Bulgaria) M Delcheva	21	21
(Algeria) H Bouksani	6	14
(Germany) S S Kuspert	20	13
(Malaysia) Eng S J	22	21
(Singapore) J R Sito	10	10
(Indonesia) A O Winata	21	21
(Slovakia) K Vargova	21	16	16
(New Zealand) S Fu	16	21	21

Third round
11	(Bulgaria) M Delcheva	16	21	19
(Malaysia) Eng S J	21	19	21
(Indonesia) A O Winata	21	21
(New Zealand) S Fu	7	7

Fourth round
(Malaysia) Eng S J	12	6
(Indonesia) A O Winata	21	21

=== Bottom half ===
==== Section 9 ====
First round
(Mongolia) K Darkhanbaatar	5	10
(Macau) Zou Z L	21	21

Second round
(Macau) Zou Z L	21	21
(El Salvador) K Lara	6	5
(Nepal) R Maharjan	8	11
(England) A Holden	21	21
(Netherlands) M Linders	21	21
(Finland) H-L Lindberg	13	12
(Norway) E Waland	10	8
10	(Thailand) C Jucharoen	21	21

Third round
(Macau) Zou Z L	6	14
(England) A Holden	21	21
(Netherlands) M Linders	10	15
10	(Thailand) C Jucharoen	21	21

Fourth round
(England) A Holden	21	18	14
10	(Thailand) C Jucharoen	13	21	21

==== Section 10 ====
First round

Second round
(Georgia (country)) L Lanchava	9	7
(Brazil) J Viana	21	21
(Russia) A Pustinskaia	21	21
(Ghana) G A Atipaka	6	12
(Sweden) A Pillai	21	21
(Algeria) L Mazri	13	4
(Pakistan) L Masoud	8	5
7	(Japan) A Takahashi	21	21

Third round
(Brazil) J Viana	14	16
(Russia) A Pustinskaia	21	21
(Sweden) A Pillai	7	17
7	(Japan) A Takahashi	21	21

Fourth round
(Russia) A Pustinskaia	15	10
7	(Japan) A Takahashi	21	21

==== Section 11 ====
First round
(Spain) E Andreu	21	21
(Australia) M Chan	12	15

Second round
(Spain) E Andreu	17	19
(Malaysia) Lim M C	21	21
(South Korea) Park G-e	21	21
(Poland) A Goszczynska	3	8
(Switzerland) J Stadelmann	21	21
(Slovakia) M Tarcalova	10	10
(Belgium) J De Langhe	14	12
16	(Indonesia) Choirunnisa	21	21

Third round
(Malaysia) Lim M C	17	21	12
(South Korea) Park G-e	21	18	21
(Switzerland) J Stadelmann	16	12
16	(Indonesia) Choirunnisa	21	21

Fourth round
(South Korea) Park G-e	18	22	14
16	(Indonesia) Choirunnisa	21	20	21

==== Section 12 ====
First round

Second round
(United States) L Lam	21	21
(South Africa) J Scholtz	19	11
(Egypt) J Ashraf	11	12
(Canada) C Choi	21	21
(Macau) Chio W U	6	4
(Canada) K Ho-Shue	21	21
(South Africa) M de Beer	6	4
4	(Malaysia) Goh J W	21	21

Third round
(United States) L Lam	18	11
(Canada) C Choi	21	21
(Canada) K Ho-Shue	12	16
4	(Malaysia) Goh J W	21	21

Fourth round
(Canada) C Choi	14	13
4	(Malaysia) Goh J W	21	21

==== Section 13 ====
First round
(Vietnam) Tran T P T	21	21
(Turkey) B Unlu	15	11

Second round
(Vietnam) Tran T P T	13	21	19
(India) A Chaliha	21	14	21
(Sri Lanka) D Dias	15	11
(France) M Lambert	21	21
(Hong Kong) Leung Y Y	21	21
(Ghana) J Abitty	7	5
(England) P Reyes	13	11
9	(Thailand) C Korepap	21	21

Third round
(India) A Chaliha	21	19	21
(France) M Lambert	13	21	13
(Hong Kong) Leung Y Y	15	15
9	(Thailand) C Korepap	21	21

Fourth round
(India) A Chaliha	22	21	17
9	(Thailand) C Korepap	24	19	21

==== Section 14 ====
First round

Second round
(Norway) V Ellingsen	21	21
(Brazil) S Lima	17	17
(Denmark) L Christophersen	21	21
(Poland) W Adamek	17	12
(Indonesia) A D Widyaningrum	19	21	21
(India) P Barve	21	13	16
(New Zealand) E Smith	3	3
5	(China) Han Y	21	21

Third round
(Norway) V Ellingsen	11	13
(Denmark) L Christophersen	21	21
(Indonesia) A D Widyaningrum	11	13
5	(China) Han Y	21	21

Fourth round
(Denmark) L Christophersen	12	18
5	(China) Han Y	21	21

==== Section 15 ====
First round
(Armenia) M Stepanyan	9	6
(Chinese Taipei) Lin S-y	21	21

Second round
(Chinese Taipei) Lin S-y	21	21
(Czech Republic) K Zuzakova	6	13
(Nepal) S Mukhiya	9	10
(Latvia) U Berga	21	21
(Chinese Taipei) Yu C	19	21	21
(Germany) M Wilson	21	17	13
(China) Zhou M	24	21
14	(Hungary) R Madarasz	22	9

Third round
(Chinese Taipei) Lin S-y	21	21
(Latvia) U Berga	16	10
(Chinese Taipei) Yu C	8	15
(China) Zhou M	21	21

Fourth round
(Chinese Taipei) Lin S-y	21	13	19
(China) Zhou M	16	21	21

==== Section 16 ====
First round

Second round
(Bulgaria) H Popovska	21	21
(Scotland) L Middleton	14	18
(New Zealand) T Otene	9	6
(Thailand) N Aimsaard	21	21
(Russia) A Shapovalova	21	21
(Portugal) A F. Goncalves	10	8
(Chinese Taipei) Lin J-h	14	12
2	(Singapore) Yeo J M	21	21

Third round
(Bulgaria) H Popovska	9	11
(Thailand) N Aimsaard	21	21
(Russia) A Shapovalova	7	12
2	(Singapore) Yeo J M	21	21

Fourth round
(Thailand) N Aimsaard	7	19
2	(Singapore) Yeo J M	21	21
