= 2016 Badminton Asia Junior Championships – Girls' singles =

Tournament details
- Dates: 13 – 17 July 2016
- Edition: 19
- Venue: CPB Badminton and Sports Science Training Center
- Location: Bangkok, Thailand

The girls' singles tournament of the 2016 Badminton Asia Junior Championships was held from July 13–17 at the CPB Badminton and Sports Science Training Center, Bangkok. The defending champions of the last edition is He Bingjiao from China. Pornpawee Chochuwong, Goh Jin Wei and Chen Yufei were the top 3 seeded this year. Chen Yufei of China emerged as the champion after defeat Gregoria Mariska of Indonesia in the finals with the score 25–23, 21–14.

== Seeded ==
1. (Thailand) Pornpawee Chochuwong (quarter final)
2. (Malaysia) Goh Jin Wei (quarter final)
3. (China) Chen Yufei (champion)
4. (Indonesia) Gregoria Mariska (final)
5. (Japan) Natsuki Nidaira (quarter final)
6. (South Korea) Kim Ga-eun (semi final)
7. (China) Gao Fangjie (semi final)
8. (Thailand) Pattarasuda Chaiwan (quarter final)

== Draw ==
=== Finals ===
Quarterfinals
1	(Thailand) Pornpawee Chochuwong	9	1^{r}
7	(China) Gao Fangjie	21	7
4	(Indonesia) Gregoria Mariska	19	24	21
5	(Japan) Natsuki Nidaira	21	22	19
8	(Thailand) Pattarasuda Chaiwan	9	13
3	(China) Chen Yufei	21	21
6	(South Korea) Kim Ga-eun	21	17	21
2	(Malaysia) Goh Jin Wei	13	21	13

Semifinals
7	(China) Gao Fangjie	13	21	10
4	(Indonesia) Gregoria Mariska	21	13	21
3	(China) Chen Yufei
6	(South Korea) Kim Ga-eun	wo

Final
4	(Indonesia) Gregoria Mariska	23	14
3	(China) Chen Yufei	25	21

=== Top half ===
==== Section 1 ====
First round
1	(Thailand) P Chochuwong
BYE
(Japan) N Oie	21	21
(Chinese Taipei) Lai I-t	8	15
(Malaysia) T Muralitharan	21	21
(Hong Kong) Leung SL	17	12
(South Korea) Kim H-i
(India) S Pardeshi	wo

Second round
1	(Thailand) P Chochuwong	21	19	21
(Japan) N Oie	13	21	12
(Malaysia) T Muralitharan	20	20
(South Korea) Kim H-i	22	22

Third round
1	(Thailand) P Chochuwong	21	21
(South Korea) Kim H-i	13	17

==== Section 2 ====
First round
7	(China) Gao FJ
BYE
(Singapore) Yeo JM	21	21
(Indonesia) D Putri	10	19
(Vietnam) Tran TPT	18	22	21
(Thailand) N Chatputtarin	21	20	10
(Sri Lanka) D Dias	21	21
(Macau) Gong XX	10	10

Second round
7	(China) Gao FJ	21	21
(Singapore) Yeo JM	18	16
(Vietnam) Tran TPT	24	21
(Sri Lanka) D Dias	22	14

Third round
7	(China) Gao FJ	21	21
(Vietnam) Tran TPT	4	4

==== Section 3 ====
First round
4	(Indonesia) G Mariska
BYE
(China) Cai YY	21	21
(Singapore) B Lim	4	7
(Hong Kong) Yeung SY	14	18
(India) S Gautam	21	21
(Philippines) M Sevilla	wo
(South Korea) Baek H-n

Second round
4	(Indonesia) G Mariska	19	21	21
(China) Cai YY	21	19	16
(India) S Gautam	20	21	14
(South Korea) Baek H-n	22	13	21

Third round
4	(Indonesia) G Mariska	21	21
(South Korea) Baek H-n	11	13

==== Section 4 ====
First round
5	(Japan) N Nidaira	21	21
(Sri Lanka) I Kuruppu	7	10
(Mongolia) T Choinkhor	4	2
(Thailand) B Khamsaitong	21	21
(Chinese Taipei) Liang T-y	21	18	17
(Myanmar) Thet HT	16	21	21
(Malaysia) Eoon QX	21	21
(Kazakhstan) I Gordeyeva	2	5

Second round
5	(Japan) N Nidaira	21	21
(Thailand) B Khamsaitong	12	10
(Myanmar) Thet HT	21	21
(Malaysia) Eoon QX	13	12

Third round
5	(Japan) N Nidaira	21	21
(Myanmar) Thet HT	5	9

=== Bottom half ===
==== Section 5 ====
First round
(Singapore) J Sito	21	21
(Sri Lanka) H Ambalangodage	10	7
(India) V Gummadi	21	11	10
(Indonesia) A Winata	16	21	21
(Macau) Ng WC	3	9
(South Korea) Byun S-i	21	21
(Hong Kong) Yau MY	19	21	14
8	(Thailand) P Chaiwan	21	16	21

Second round
(Singapore) J Sito	15	10
(Indonesia) A Winata	21	21
(South Korea) Byun S-i	12	17
8	(Thailand) P Chaiwan	21	21

Third round
(Indonesia) A Winata	19	16
8	(Thailand) P Chaiwan	21	21

==== Section 6 ====
First round
(Chinese Taipei) Hu L-f	21	21
(Kazakhstan) Y Kharchenko	11	10
(Vietnam) Pham TK	11	5
(Japan) S Ebihara	21	21
(Mongolia) B Batnairamdal	3	3
(Malaysia) K Selvaduray	21	21
BYE
3	(China) Chen YF

Second round
(Chinese Taipei) Hu L-f	15	17
(Japan) S Ebihara	21	21
(Malaysia) K Selvaduray	8	14
3	(China) Chen YF	21	21

Third round
(Japan) S Ebihara	8	8
3	(China) Chen YF	21	21

==== Section 7 ====
First round
(Indonesia) G Moningka	16	20
(China) Li WM	21	22
(Japan) A Takahashi	21	21
(Singapore) N Khan	11	11
(Thailand) N Aimsaard	13	21	21
(India) R Mukherjee	21	11	13
BYE
6	(South Korea) Kim G-e

Second round
(China) Li WM	13	22	21
(Japan) A Takahashi	21	20	16
(Thailand) N Aimsaard	21	10	9
6	(South Korea) Kim G-e	16	21	21

Third round
(China) Li WM	18	14
6	(South Korea) Kim G-e	21	21

==== Section 8 ====
First round
(Macau) Ao IK	19	9
(Iran) S Abedkhojasteh	21	21
(Chinese Taipei) Lin J-r	7	13
(Thailand) C Jucharoen	21	21
(Sri Lanka) T Ratnayaka	10	7
(Hong Kong) Yeung PL	21	21
BYE
2	(Malaysia) Goh JW

Second round
(Iran) S Abedkhojasteh	8	7
(Thailand) C Jucharoen	21	21
(Hong Kong) Yeung PL	8	7
2	(Malaysia) Goh JW	21	21

Third round
(Thailand) C Jucharoen	11	10
2	(Malaysia) Goh JW	21	21
