= Gao Fangjie =

Chinese badminton player (born 1998)

Gao Fangjie 高昉洁
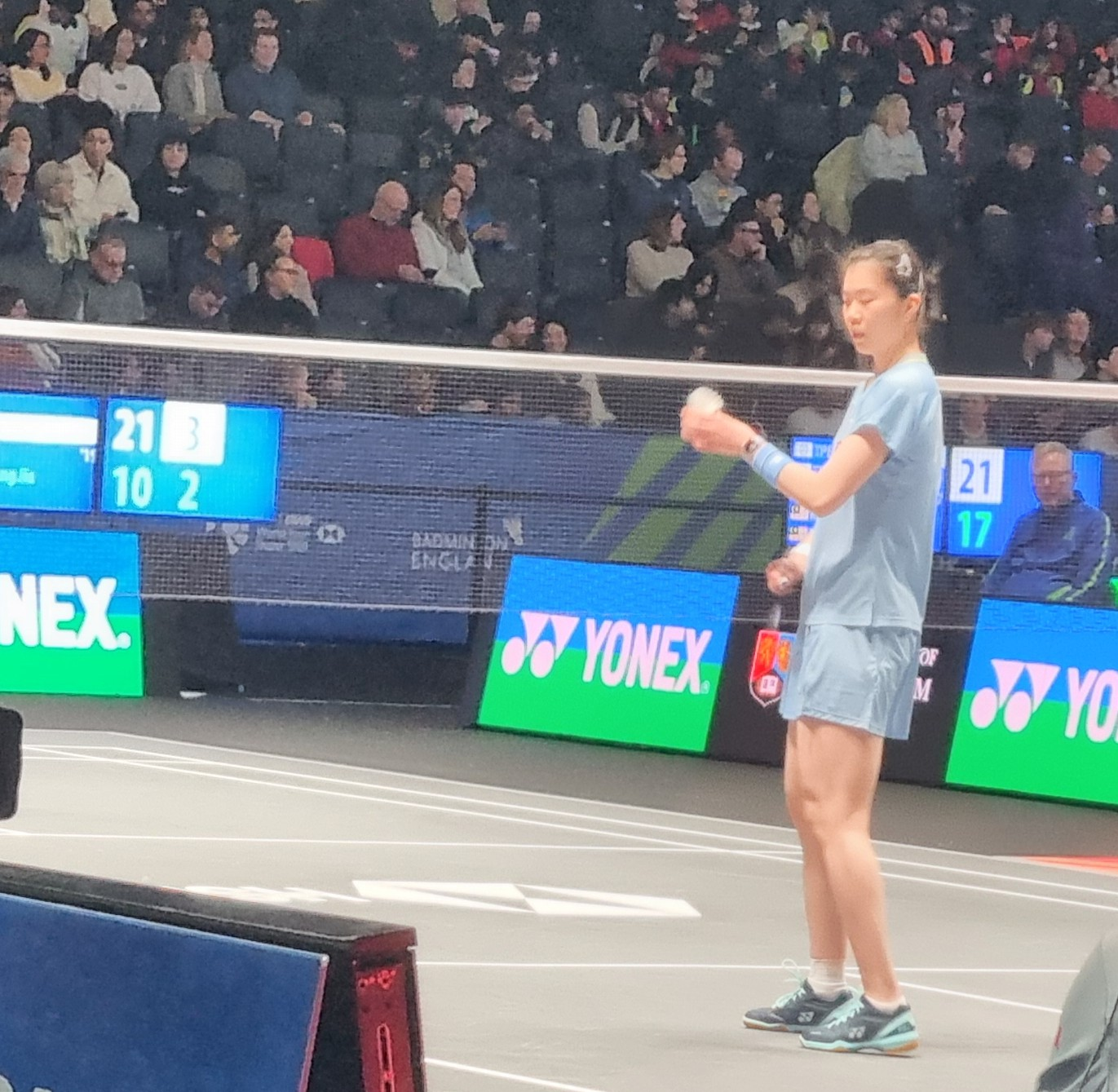

Personal information
- Born: 29 September 1998 (age 28) Nanjing, Jiangsu, China
- Height: 1.78 m (5 ft 10 in)

Sport
- Country: China
- Sport: Badminton
- Handedness: Right

Women's singles
- Highest ranking: 10 (27 January 2026)
- Current ranking: 12 (14 April 2026)
- BWF profile
Medal record
Women's badminton
Representing China
Uber Cup
Bronze medal – third place	2018 Bangkok	Women's team
Asian Games
Silver medal – second place	2018 Jakarta–Palembang	Women's team
Asian Championships
Bronze medal – third place	2025 Ningbo	Women's singles
Asia Mixed Team Championships
Gold medal – first place	2023 Dubai	Mixed team
Asia Team Championships
Silver medal – second place	2018 Alor Setar	Women's team
Silver medal – second place	2026 Qingdao	Women's team
World Junior Championships
Gold medal – first place	2015 Lima	Mixed team
Gold medal – first place	2016 Bilbao	Mixed team
Asia Junior Championships
Gold medal – first place	2016 Bangkok	Mixed team
Bronze medal – third place	2016 Bangkok	Girls' singles

Gao Fangjie (Chinese: 高昉洁; pinyin: Gāo Fǎngjié; Mandarin pronunciation: [káʊ fàŋ.tɕjě]; born 29 September 1998) is a Chinese badminton player. She was a bronze medalist in the 2025 Asian Championships. Born in Nanjing, she was part of the Chinese junior team to win the gold medals at the 2015, and 2016 World Junior; and also at the 2016 Asia Junior Championships. In 2016 Asia, she won the bronze medal in the girls' singles event. Gao was the runner-up in the senior tournament at the 2016 China International. In 2017, she reached the final round at the BWF Superseries Premier tournament at the China Open after competing from the qualification round, and beat the seeded players Nozomi Okuhara, P. V. Sindhu and Carolina Marín. In 2023, she helped the national team win the Asia Mixed Team Championships.

== Achievements ==
=== Asian Championships ===
Women's singles
Year	Venue	Opponent	Score	Result	Ref.
2025	Ningbo Olympic Sports Center Gymnasium; Ningbo, China	(China) Han Yue	14–21, 16–21	Bronze	

=== Asian Junior Championships ===
Girls' singles
Year	Venue	Opponent	Score	Result
2016	CPB Badminton Training Center; Bangkok, Thailand	(Indonesia) Gregoria Mariska Tunjung	13–21, 21–13, 10–21	Bronze

=== BWF World Tour (2 titles, 3 runners-up) ===
The BWF World Tour, which was announced on 19 March 2017 and implemented in 2018, is a series of elite badminton tournaments sanctioned by the Badminton World Federation (BWF). The BWF World Tour is divided into levels of World Tour Finals, Super 1000, Super 750, Super 500, Super 300 (part of the HSBC World Tour), and the BWF Tour Super 100.

Women's singles
Year	Tournament	Level	Opponent	Score	Result
2018	Singapore Open	Super 500	(Japan) Sayaka Takahashi	23–25, 14–21	(silver) Runner-up
2022	Indonesia Masters	Super 100	(Japan) Riko Gunji	21–10, 21–12	(gold) Winner
2023	U.S. Open	Super 300	(Thailand) Supanida Katethong	15–21, 16–21	(silver) Runner-up
2024	Macau Open	Super 300	(Chinese Taipei) Lin Hsiang-ti	21–23, 21–9, 21–11	(gold) Winner
2024	China Masters	Super 750	(South Korea) An Se-young	12–21, 8–21	(silver) Runner-up

=== BWF Superseries (1 runner-up) ===
The BWF Superseries, which was launched on 14 December 2006 and implemented in 2007, was a series of elite badminton tournaments, sanctioned by the Badminton World Federation (BWF). BWF Superseries levels were Superseries and Superseries Premier. A season of Superseries consisted of twelve tournaments around the world that had been introduced since 2011. Successful players were invited to the Superseries Finals, which were held at the end of each year.

Women's singles
Year	Tournament	Opponent	Score	Result
2017	China Open	(Japan) Akane Yamaguchi	13–21, 15–21	(silver) Runner-up

BWF Super Series Finals tournament
BWF Super Series Premier tournament
BWF Super Series tournament

=== BWF Grand Prix (1 title) ===
The BWF Grand Prix had two levels, the Grand Prix and Grand Prix Gold. It was a series of badminton tournaments sanctioned by the Badminton World Federation (BWF) and played between 2007 and 2017.

Women's singles
Year	Tournament	Opponent	Score	Result
2017	Korea Masters	(South Korea) Lee Jang-mi	21–19, 21–5	(gold) Winner

BWF Grand Prix Gold tournament
BWF Grand Prix tournament

=== BWF International Challenge/Series (2 titles, 1 runner-up) ===
Women's singles
Year	Tournament	Opponent	Score	Result
2016	China International	(China) Hui Xirui	11–21, 21–19, 17–21	(silver) Runner-up
2022 (II)	Indonesia International	(Japan) Riko Gunji	21–9, 21–11	(gold) Winner
2022	Malaysia International	(Chinese Taipei) Chiu Pin-chian	21–10, 21–16	(gold) Winner

BWF International Challenge tournament
BWF International Series tournament
