= Gregoria Mariska Tunjung =

Indonesian badminton player

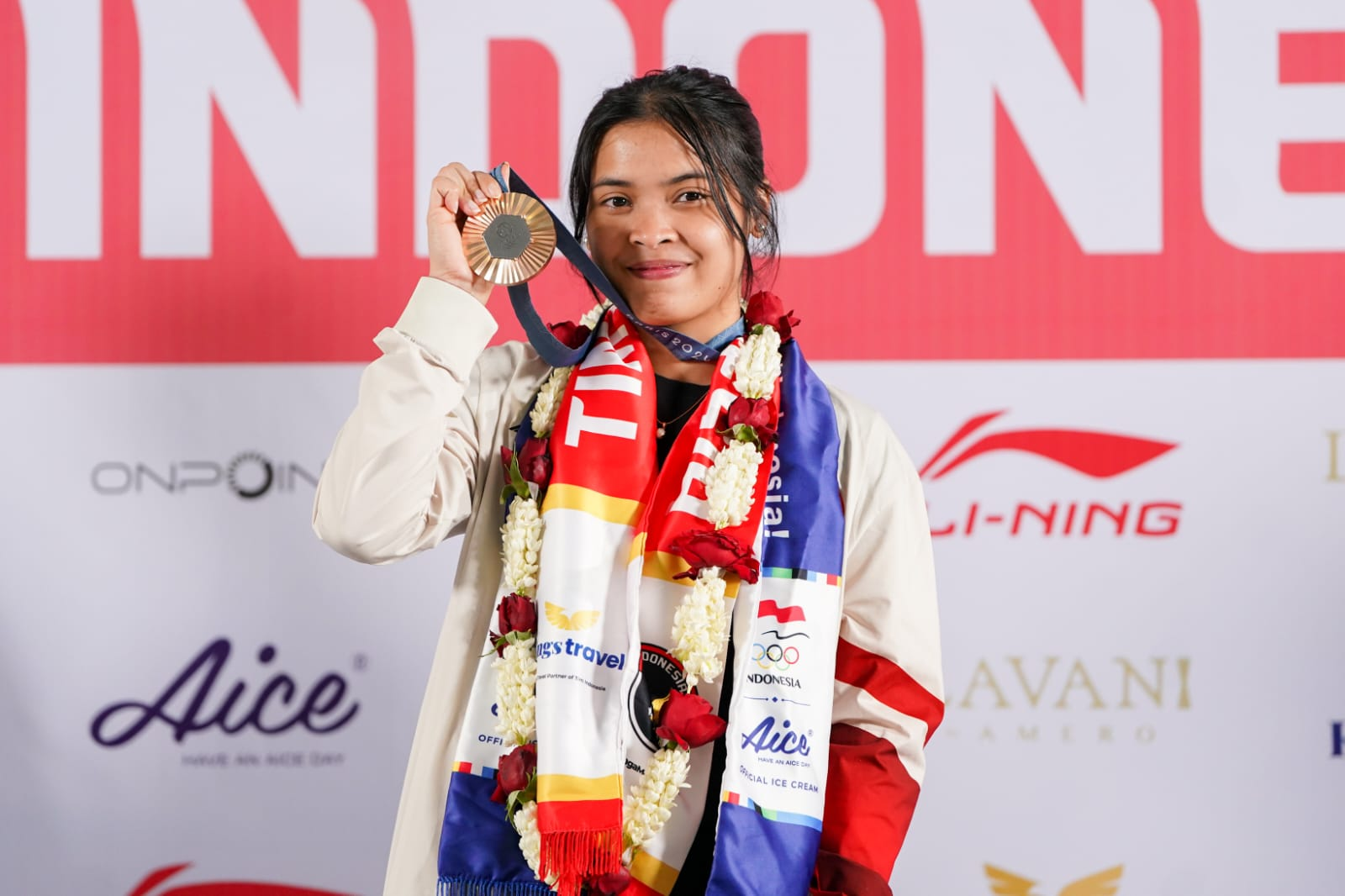
- Tunjung in 2024

Personal information
- Nickname: Jorji
- Born: Gregoria Mariska Tunjung Cahyaningsih; 11 August 1999 (age 27) Wonogiri, Central Java, Indonesia
- Years active: 2013–present
- Height: 1.64 m (5 ft 5 in)
- Weight: 57 kg (126 lb)
- Spouse: Mikha Angelo (m. 2025)

Sport
- Country: Indonesia
- Sport: Badminton
- Handedness: Right
- Coached by: Imam Tohari; Nunung Subandoro; Indra Wijaya; Herli Djaenudin

Women's singles
- Highest ranking: 5 (14 January 2025)
- Current ranking: 146 (5 September 2026)
- BWF profile
Medal record
Women's badminton
Representing Indonesia
Olympic Games
Bronze medal – third place	2024 Paris	Women's singles
Sudirman Cup
Bronze medal – third place	2019 Nanning	Mixed team
Uber Cup
Silver medal – second place	2024 Chengdu	Women's team
Asian Games
Bronze medal – third place	2018 Jakarta–Palembang	Women's team
Asia Team Championships
Gold medal – first place	2022 Selangor	Women's team
Bronze medal – third place	2018 Alor Setar	Women's team
SEA Games
Silver medal – second place	2019 Philippines	Women's team
Silver medal – second place	2021 Vietnam	Women's team
Silver medal – second place	2025 Thailand	Women's team
Bronze medal – third place	2015 Singapore	Women's team
Bronze medal – third place	2017 Kuala Lumpur	Women's singles
Bronze medal – third place	2017 Kuala Lumpur	Women's team
Bronze medal – third place	2021 Vietnam	Women's singles
World Junior Championships
Gold medal – first place	2017 Yogyakarta	Girls' singles
Silver medal – second place	2014 Alor Setar	Mixed team
Silver medal – second place	2015 Lima	Mixed team
Asian Junior Championships
Silver medal – second place	2016 Bangkok	Girls' singles
Silver medal – second place	2017 Jakarta	Mixed team
Bronze medal – third place	2015 Bangkok	Mixed team

Gregoria Mariska Tunjung Cahyaningsih (born 11 August 1999) is an Indonesian badminton player in women's singles and an Olympic medalist. She started her career at the badminton club PB Mutiara Cardinal in Bandung, West Java, and was called to the national team in 2013. She was the girls' singles champion at the 2017 World Junior Championships. Tunjung also captained the Indonesia women's team at the 2022 Asia Team Championships, where they emerged champions. Tunjung's best achievement is when she won the bronze medal at the 2024 Summer Olympics in Paris.

== Career ==
In 2014, Tunjung reached the final of the Malaysia International from qualifying round, beating among them the first seed Aprilia Yuswandari. Unfortunately, in the final round she was defeated by Chen Jiayuan in straight game. In 2015, at the age of 16, Tunjung became champion at the Singapore International, defeating home favorite Yeo Jia Min in the final. She later won the Indonesia International Challenge held in Surabaya.

In 2016, Tunjung won the silver medal in the girls' singles event at the Asian Junior Championships.

Tunjung opened the 2017 season by reaching the final of the BWF Grand Prix in the Syed Modi International. She finished as runner-up after her defeat to first seed and 2016 Olympic silver medalist P. V. Sindhu. She also finished runner-up to Kisona Selvaduray at the Indonesia International Series. In August, Tunjung obtained bronze medals at the individual and team events of the SEA Games. In October, Tunjung becomes the first Indonesian in 25 years to win the World Junior Championship girls' singles title.

Despite being a junior champion, Tunjung's senior career was quite tumultuous. In 2018, she won her only title that year at the Finnish Open, beating her compatriot Ruselli Hartawan in the final. She obtained a silver women's teams medal at the 2019 SEA Games, but did not win the individual event medals as she was stopped by Kisona Selvaduray in the quarter-finals.

Tunjung qualified for the Tokyo Olympics as the sole Indonesian representative in women's singles. Her Olympic debut ended in the round of 16 with a defeat against Ratchanok Intanon. She was part of the Indonesian team for the 2021 Sudirman Cup. Indonesia advanced to the knockout stage but lost at the quarterfinals against Malaysia. Later she competed at the postponed 2020 Uber Cup. Her results at the BWF World Tour tournaments were far from ideal, with second round exits at the European leg in Denmark, France, Germany, and home tournament Indonesia Masters, followed by a first round exit at the Indonesia Open.

Tunjung started 2022 on a higher note as the captain of the Indonesian women's team at the Asia Team Championships, winning all her matches from the group stage and contributing to their victory against South Korea in the final. However, her struggle in individual tournaments persisted, and her rank went down to 31 after her first round exit at the Indonesia Open. At the second half of 2022, Tunjung won bronze in the women's singles at the 2021 SEA Games, and obtained silver in the women's teams event. She then reached her first finals in the BWF World Tour event in the 2022 Australian Open. In the final, she lost to An Se-young in straight games. Thanks to her runner-up finish in Australia, Tunjung edged closer to qualify for the 2022 BWF World Tour Finals, and officially became the first ever Indonesian women singles player to qualify for the World Tour Finals after the withdrawal of P. V. Sindhu opened a spot for her promotion. She finished fourth in Group A standings with a victory against Chen Yufei and losses against An Se-young and Akane Yamaguchi.

=== 2023 ===
Tunjung kicked off the 2023 season with a poor performance, where she fell at the second round at the Malaysia Open against Hsu Wen-chi, despite an impressive victory against He Bingjiao at the first round. She also lost in the second round of the India Open, this time to Korean second seed An Se-young. She reached the quarterfinals of Indonesia Masters, where she lost against Han Yue. At the Asia Mixed Team Championships held in Dubai, Tunjung helped the national team made to the quarter-finals, but then Indonesia lost to South Korea 1–3.

Tunjung began showing visible progress with a quarter-finals finish at the All England Open in March, where she gave a tough fight to fourth seed and Olympic gold medalist Chen Yufei. This continued at the Swiss Open, where she finished in the semi-finals, losing to eventual champion Pornpawee Chochuwong.

Tunjung won her first ever BWF World Tour title at the Spain Masters by beating P. V. Sindhu in the final. This was also her first victory over Sindhu in eight matches. After this achievement, Tunjung's world rank rose to 10th, making her the first Indonesian women's singles player to enter the top 10 since Maria Kristin Yulianti in 2008.

In April, Tunjung advanced to the quarter-finals of the Asian Championships, but was eliminated by Chen Yufei in rubber games. Tunjung alongside the Indonesian team competed at the 2023 Sudirman Cup in Suzhou, China. She won two matches in the group stage, against Talia Ng of Canada and Yvonne Li of Germany. Indonesia progressed to the knockout stage but lost at the quarter-finals against China, where she again lost to Chen Yufei. In the following week, she again defeated Sindhu to reach her first ever Super 500 final in the Malaysia Masters, but lost to Akane Yamaguchi.

Tunjung suffered early exits in the Singapore, Indonesia, and the Korea Opens, before reaching the semi-finals in the Japan Open after defeating Yamaguchi. However, she had to concede defeat to He Bingjiao. Tunjung again faced Yamaguchi at the World Championships, but this time was defeated at the quarterfinals. She competed at the 2022 Asian Games but was unable to win any medal in both the team (lost to China) and individual events (lost to Aya Ohori).

In the European leg, Tunjung suffered two early exits at the Denmark Open and French Open, both against P.V. Sindhu. She bounced back at the Kumamoto Masters by defeating Chen Yufei in the finals, thus becoming the first ever Indonesian women's singles player to win a Super 500 or equivalent title since its inception in 2007. Afterwards, Tunjung exited the China Masters at the second round after losing to Nozomi Okuhara. Nevertheless, she secured her spot in the World Tour Finals as part of group A with An Se-young, Tai Tzu-ying, and Kim Ga-eun.

=== 2024–2025 ===
She was selected as a member of the Indonesian women's team at the Uber Cup in May, and made history by reaching the final at the Uber Cup since 2008. In the final Indonesia lost to China 0–3.

At the Paris 2024 Olympic Games, Spanish player Carolina Marin retired from her semi-final match against He Bingjiao from China due to a right knee injury. Consequently, the bronze medal match was canceled, and Tunjung was awarded the bronze medal automatically.

In 2025, she made her fifth appearance at the SEA Games, and helps the team won the silver medal.

== Awards and nominations ==
Award	Year	Category	Result	Ref.
BWF Awards	2017	Eddy Choong Most Promising Player of the Year	Nominated	
BWF Awards	2018	Eddy Choong Most Promising Player of the Year	Nominated	
BWF Awards	2024	Women's singles Player of the Year	Nominated	
Indonesian Sport Awards	2018	Favorite Women's Team Athlete with 2018 Asian Games women's badminton team	Won	
iNews Indonesia Awards	2023	Favorite Athlete	Nominated	
RCTI Indonesian Sports Entertainment Awards	2024	Most Popular Female Athlete	Nominated	
Santini JebreeetMedia Awards	2024	Favorite Female Athlete	Nominated	

== Achievements ==
=== Olympic Games ===
Women's singles
Year	Venue	Opponent	Score	Result	Ref.
2024	Porte de La Chapelle Arena, Paris, France	(Spain) Carolina Marín	Walkover	Bronze	

=== SEA Games ===
Women's singles
Year	Venue	Opponent	Score	Result	Ref.
2017	Axiata Arena, Kuala Lumpur, Malaysia	(Malaysia) Soniia Cheah Su Ya	20–22, 13–21	Bronze	
2021	Bac Giang Gymnasium, Bắc Giang, Vietnam	(Thailand) Phittayaporn Chaiwan	18–21, 15–21	Bronze	

=== BWF World Junior Championships ===
Girls' singles
Year	Venue	Opponent	Score	Result	Ref.
2017	GOR Among Rogo, Yogyakarta, Indonesia	(China) Han Yue	21–13, 13–21, 24–22	Gold	

=== Asian Junior Championships ===
Girls' singles
Year	Venue	Opponent	Score	Result	Ref.
2016	CPB Badminton Training Center, Bangkok, Thailand	(China) Chen Yufei	23–25, 14–21	Silver	

=== BWF World Tour (2 titles, 5 runners-up) ===
The BWF World Tour, which was announced on 19 March 2017 and implemented in 2018, is a series of elite badminton tournaments sanctioned by the Badminton World Federation (BWF). The BWF World Tour is divided into levels of World Tour Finals, Super 1000, Super 750, Super 500, Super 300, and the BWF Tour Super 100.

Women's singles
Year	Tournament	Level	Opponent	Score	Result	Ref.
2022	Australian Open	Super 300	(South Korea) An Se-young	17–21, 9–21	(silver) Runner-up	
2023	Spain Masters	Super 300	(India) P. V. Sindhu	21–8, 21–8	(gold) Winner	
2023	Malaysia Masters	Super 500	(Japan) Akane Yamaguchi	17–21, 7–21	(silver) Runner-up	
2023	Japan Masters	Super 500	(China) Chen Yufei	21–12, 21–12	(gold) Winner	
2024	Swiss Open	Super 300	(Spain) Carolina Marín	19–21, 21–13, 20–22	(silver) Runner-up	
2024	Japan Masters	Super 500	(Japan) Akane Yamaguchi	12–21, 12–21	(silver) Runner-up	
2025	Japan Masters	Super 500	(Thailand) Ratchanok Intanon	16–21, 20–22	(silver) Runner-up	

=== BWF Grand Prix (1 runner-up) ===
The BWF Grand Prix had two levels, the Grand Prix and Grand Prix Gold. It was a series of badminton tournaments sanctioned by the Badminton World Federation (BWF) and played between 2007 and 2017.

Women's singles
Year	Tournament	Opponent	Score	Result	Ref.
2017	Syed Modi International	(India) P. V. Sindhu	13–21, 14–21	(silver) Runner-up	

BWF Grand Prix Gold tournament
BWF Grand Prix tournament

=== BWF International Challenge/Series (3 titles, 2 runners-up) ===
Women's singles
Year	Tournament	Opponent	Score	Result	Ref.
2014	Malaysia International	(Singapore) Chen Jiayuan	8–21, 19–21	(silver) Runner-up	
2015	Singapore International	(Singapore) Yeo Jia Min	22–20, 21–15	(gold) Winner	
2015	Indonesia International	(Malaysia) Tee Jing Yi	21–15, 15–21, 21–7	(gold) Winner	
2017	Indonesia International	(Malaysia) Kisona Selvaduray	21–10, 16–21, 19–21	(silver) Runner-up	
2018	Finnish Open	(Indonesia) Ruselli Hartawan	21–7, 21–13	(gold) Winner	

BWF International Challenge tournament
BWF International Series tournament

=== BWF Junior International (2 titles, 2 runners-up) ===
Girls' singles
Year	Tournament	Opponent	Score	Result	Ref.
2013	Indonesia Junior International	(Indonesia) Fitriani	18–21, 16–21	(silver) Runner-up	
2014	Indonesia Junior International	(Indonesia) Fitriani	17–21, 10–21	(silver) Runner-up	
2015	Indonesia Junior International	(Thailand) Supanida Katethong	21–16, 19–21, 21–19	(gold) Winner	
2017	Banthongyord Junior International	(Thailand) Pattarasuda Chaiwan	21–11, 21–14	(gold) Winner	

BWF Junior International Grand Prix tournament
BWF Junior International Challenge tournament
BWF Junior International Series tournament
BWF Junior Future Series tournament

== Performance timeline ==
Key

W	Won	F	Finalist	SF	Semi-finalist
QF	Quarter-finalist	#R	Rounds 4, 3, 2, 1	RR	Round-robin stage
Q#	Qualification round	A	Absent	w/d	Withdrew
G	Gold	S	Silver	B	Bronze
NH	Not held	N/A	Not applicable	DNQ	Did not qualify

=== National team ===
- Junior level

Team events	2014	2015	2016	2017
Asian Junior Championships	QF	B	QF	S
World Junior Championships	S	S	5th	5th

- Senior level

Team events	2015	2016	2017	2018	2019	2020	2021	2022	2023	2024	2025	Ref
SEA Games	B	NH	B	NH	S	NH	S	NH	A	NH	S	
Asia Team Championships	NH	A	NH	B	NH	QF	NH	G	NH	A	NH	
Asia Mixed Team Championships	NH		QF	NH	A	NH			QF	NH	A	
Asian Games	NH			B	NH			QF	NH			
Uber Cup	NH	QF	NH	QF	NH	QF	NH	A	NH	S	NH	
Sudirman Cup	A	NH	RR	NH	B	NH	QF	NH	QF	NH	A	

=== Individual competitions ===
- Junior level

Events	2014	2015	2016	2017	Ref
Asian Junior Championships	3R	3R	S	w/d	
World Junior Championships	2R	4R	5R	G	

- Senior level

Events	2017	2018	2019	2020	2021	2022	2023	2024	2025	Ref
SEA Games	B	NH	QF	NH	B	NH	A	NH	A	
Asian Championships	A		2R	NH		1R	QF	QF	2R	
Asian Games	NH	2R	NH			QF	NH			
World Championships	A	2R	3R	NH	w/d	2R	QF	NH	3R	
Olympic Games	NH			2R	NH			B	NH	

Tournament	BWF Superseries / Grand Prix				BWF World Tour								Best	Ref
Tournament	2014	2015	2016	2017	2018	2019	2020	2021	2022	2023	2024	2025	Best	Ref
Malaysia Open	A				1R	1R	NH		2R	2R	QF	1R	QF ('24)	
India Open	A						NH		A	2R	2R	SF	SF ('25)	
Indonesia Masters	1R	1R	1R	NH	1R	2R	1R	1R	2R	QF	QF	QF	QF ('23, '24, '25)	
Thailand Masters	NH		A		QF	A	QF	NH		A			QF ('18, '20)	
German Open	A					1R	NH		A				1R ('19)	
Orléans Masters	N/A				QF	A	NH	w/d	w/d	w/d	A		QF ('18)	
All England Open	A					1R	2R	A	1R	QF	QF	QF	QF ('23, '24, '25)	
Swiss Open	A						NH	A		SF	F	A	F ('24)	
Chinese Taipei Open	A					QF	NH		A				QF ('19)	
Thailand Open	NH	2R	A	1R	SF	1R	1R	NH	A		QF	A	SF ('18)	
Thailand Open	NH	2R	A	1R	SF	1R	2R	NH	A		QF	A	SF ('18)	
Malaysia Masters	A	Q1	A	1R	A	1R	1R	NH	SF	F	A		F ('23)	
Singapore Open	A					1R	NH		QF	2R	SF	A	SF ('24)	
Indonesia Open	A	Q1	1R	2R	2R	2R	NH	2R	1R	1R	QF	A	QF ('24)	
Japan Open	A			Q1	2R	2R	NH		QF	SF	w/d	1R	SF ('23)	
China Open	A				QF	1R	NH			1R	1R	QF	QF ('18, '25)	
Macau Open	A			1R	A		NH				A		1R ('17)	
Hong Kong Open	A						NH			SF	2R	A	SF ('23)	
China Masters	A					2R	NH			2R	1R	w/d	2R ('19, '23)	
Korea Open	A			2R	A	QF	NH		A	2R	A		QF ('19)	
Arctic Open	N/A						NH			A	SF	A	SF ('24)	
Denmark Open	A				SF	1R	A	2R	1R	2R	SF	1R	SF ('18, '24)	
French Open	A				QF	1R	NH	2R	1R	1R	2R	1R	QF ('18)	
Hylo Open	A							2R	SF	A			SF ('22)	
Korea Masters	A			QF	1R	A	NH		A				QF ('17)	
Japan Masters	NH									W	F	F	W ('23)	
Australian Open	A					1R	NH		F	A		w/d	F ('22)	
Syed Modi International	A			F	A		NH		A				F ('17)	
Superseries / World Tour Finals	DNQ								RR	RR	RR	DNQ	RR ('22, '23, '24)	
Chinese Taipei Masters	NH	1R	A	NH									1R ('15)	
New Zealand Open	A				QF	QF	NH						QF ('18, '19)	
Spain Masters	NA				A				NH	W	A	NH	W ('23)	
Year-end ranking	200	99	125	43	15	24	21	26	15	7	6	14	5	
Tournament	2014	2015	2016	2017	2018	2019	2020	2021	2022	2023	2024	2025	Best	Ref

== Record against selected opponents ==
Record against year-end Finals finalists, World Championships semi-finalists, and Olympic quarter-finalists. Accurate as of 11 March 2025.

Players	Matches	Results		Difference
Players	Matches	Won	Lost	Difference
(China) Chen Yufei	14	3	11	–7 (Note: Tournament software did not included the women's team event of the 2022 Asian Games results for head-to-head.)
(China) Han Yue	7	3	4	–1
(China) He Bingjiao	6	2	4	–2
(China) Li Xuerui	1	0	1	–1
(China) Wang Zhiyi	7	3	4	–1
(China) Zhang Yiman	4	3	1	+2
(Chinese Taipei) Tai Tzu-ying	9	0	9	–9
(Hong Kong) Yip Pui Yin	1	0	1	–1
(India) Saina Nehwal	1	0	1	–1
(India) P. V. Sindhu	14	4	10	–6

Players	Matches	Results		Difference
Players	Matches	Won	Lost	Difference
(Indonesia) Lindaweni Fanetri	1	0	1	–1
(Japan) Aya Ohori	5	2	3	–1
(Japan) Nozomi Okuhara	8	3	5	–2
(Japan) Akane Yamaguchi	20	5	15	–10
(South Korea) An Se-young	10	0	10	–10
(South Korea) Sung Ji-hyun	5	1	4	–3
(Spain) Carolina Marín	4	2	2	0
(Thailand) Porntip Buranaprasertsuk	1	1	0	+1
(Thailand) Ratchanok Intanon	12	3	9	–6
