= Han Yue =

Chinese badminton player (born 1999)

Han Yue 韩悦
Personal information
- Born: 18 November 1999 (age 26) Zhangzhou, Fujian, China
- Years active: 2016–present
- Height: 1.68 m (5 ft 6 in)

Sport
- Country: China
- Sport: Badminton
- Handedness: Right
- Coached by: Luo Yigang

Women's singles
- Highest ranking: 3 (18 March 2025)
- Current ranking: 11 (27 October 2026)
- BWF profile
Medal record
Women's badminton
Representing China
Sudirman Cup
Gold medal – first place	2025 Xiamen	Mixed team
Uber Cup
Gold medal – first place	2020 Aarhus	Women's team
Gold medal – first place	2024 Chengdu	Women's team
Silver medal – second place	2022 Bangkok	Women's team
Silver medal – second place	2026 Horsens	Women's team
Asian Games
Gold medal – first place	2026 Aichi–Nagoya	Women's team
Silver medal – second place	2022 Hangzhou	Women's team
Asian Championships
Silver medal – second place	2025 Ningbo	Women's singles
Bronze medal – third place	2024 Ningbo	Women's singles
Asia Mixed Team Championships
Gold medal – first place	2019 Hong Kong	Mixed team
World University Games
Gold medal – first place	2021 Chengdu	Women's singles
Silver medal – second place	2021 Chengdu	Mixed team
World Junior Championships
Gold medal – first place	2017 Yogyakarta	Mixed team
Silver medal – second place	2017 Yogyakarta	Girls' singles
Asia Junior Championships
Gold medal – first place	2017 Jakarta	Girls' singles

Han Yue (Chinese: 韩悦; pinyin: Hán Yuè; Wade–Giles: Han Yue; born 18 November 1999) is a Chinese badminton player. She won the girls' singles title at the 2017 Asian Junior Championships, and the mixed team title at the World Junior Championships. Han was a part of the national team that won the 2019 Tong Yun Kai Cup. Her best achievements in an individual event were becoming the champion at the BWF World Tour Super 300 2018 Syed Modi International and the 2022 Hylo Open.

== Career ==
Han won the 2021 Summer World University Games gold medal in the women's singles by defeating Kim Ga-ram in two straight games.

Han started the 2025 season as quarter-finalists in the Malaysia and India Opens. At the All England Open, she reached the semi-finals, but had to lose to her teammate Wang Zhiyi in straight game. By reaching the finals at the Asian Championships, she upgraded the medals that she won last year. She was unable to accomplish the final match, finished with the silver medal.

== Achievements ==
=== Asian Championships ===
Women's singles
Year	Venue	Opponent	Score	Result	Ref.
2024	Ningbo Olympic Sports Center Gymnasium, Ningbo, China	(China) Chen Yufei	15–21, 16–21	Bronze	
2025	Ningbo Olympic Sports Center Gymnasium, Ningbo, China	(China) Chen Yufei	21–11, 14–21, 9–21	Silver	

=== World University Games ===
Women's singles
Year	Venue	Opponent	Score	Result	Ref.
2021	Shuangliu Sports Centre Gymnasium; Chengdu, China	(South Korea) Kim Ga-ram	21–9, 21–13	Gold	

=== BWF World Junior Championships ===
Girls' singles
Year	Venue	Opponent	Score	Result	Ref.
2017	GOR Among Rogo, Yogyakarta, Indonesia	(Indonesia) Gregoria Mariska Tunjung	13–21, 21–13, 22–24	Silver	

=== Asian Junior Championships ===
Girls' singles
Year	Venue	Opponent	Score	Result	Ref.
2017	Jaya Raya Sports Hall Training Center, Jakarta, Indonesia	(Thailand) Pattarasuda Chaiwan	21–15, 21–13	Gold	

=== BWF World Tour (5 titles, 12 runners-up) ===
The BWF World Tour, which was announced on 19 March 2017 and implemented in 2018, is a series of elite badminton tournaments sanctioned by the Badminton World Federation (BWF). The BWF World Tours are divided into levels of World Tour Finals, Super 1000, Super 750, Super 500, Super 300 (part of the HSBC World Tour), and the BWF Tour Super 100.

Women's singles
Year	Tournament	Level	Opponent	Score	Result	Ref.
2018	Vietnam Open	Super 100	(Singapore) Yeo Jia Min	19–21, 19–21	(silver) Runner-up	
2018	Macau Open	Super 300	(Canada) Michelle Li	25–23, 17–21, 15–21	(silver) Runner-up	
2018	Syed Modi International	Super 300	(India) Saina Nehwal	21–18, 21–8	(gold) Winner	
2018	Korea Masters	Super 300	(China) Li Xuerui	10–21, 16–21	(silver) Runner-up	
2019	Macau Open	Super 300	(Canada) Michelle Li	18–21, 8–21	(silver) Runner-up	
2022	Hylo Open	Super 300	(China) Zhang Yiman	21–18, 21–16	(gold) Winner	
2023	Thailand Masters	Super 300	(China) Zhang Yiman	21–15, 13–21, 18–21	(silver) Runner-up	
2023	Arctic Open	Super 500	(China) Wang Zhiyi	16–21, 22–20, 21–12	(gold) Winner	
2023	China Masters	Super 750	(China) Chen Yufei	21–18, 4–21, retired 0–0	(silver) Runner-up	
2024	Thailand Open	Super 500	(Thailand) Supanida Katethong	16–21, 23–25	(silver) Runner-up	
2024	Hong Kong Open	Super 500	(Indonesia) Putri Kusuma Wardani	21–18, 21–7	(gold) Winner	
2024	Arctic Open	Super 500	(Thailand) Ratchanok Intanon	21–10, 21–13	(gold) Winner	
2024	BWF World Tour Finals	World Tour Finals	(China) Wang Zhiyi	21–19, 19–21, 11–21	(silver) Runner-up	
2025	Malaysia Masters	Super 500	(China) Wang Zhiyi	21–13, 13–21, 18–21	(silver) Runner-up	
2025	China Open	Super 1000	(China) Wang Zhiyi	8–21, 13–21	(silver) Runner-up	
2025	Hong Kong Open	Super 500	(China) Wang Zhiyi	14–21, 22–24	(silver) Runner-up	
2025	China Masters	Super 750	(South Korea) An Se-young	11–21, 3–21	(silver) Runner-up	

== Record against selected opponents ==
Record against year-end finalists, World Championships semi-finalists, and Olympic quarter-finalists. Accurate as of 23 December 2025.

Players	Matches	Results		Difference
Players	Matches	Won	Lost	Difference
(China) Chen Yufei	11	1	10	–9
(China) He Bingjiao	8	0	8	–8
(China) Li Xuerui	2	1	1	0
(China) Wang Zhiyi	17	3	14	–11
(China) Zhang Yiman	11	6	5	+1
(Chinese Taipei) Tai Tzu-ying	3	0	3	–3
(India) Saina Nehwal	4	3	1	+2
(India) P. V. Sindhu	8	1	7	–6

Players	Matches	Results		Difference
Players	Matches	Won	Lost	Difference
(Indonesia) Gregoria Mariska Tunjung	10	6	4	+2
(Indonesia) Putri Kusuma Wardani	5	5	0	+5
(Japan) Aya Ohori	8	7	1	+6
(Japan) Nozomi Okuhara	4	1	3	–2
(Japan) Akane Yamaguchi	10	3	7	–4
(South Korea) An Se-young	11	2	9	–7
(Spain) Carolina Marín	5	1	4	–3
(Thailand) Ratchanok Intanon	9	2	7	–5
