= Asuka Takahashi =

Japanese badminton player (born 1999)

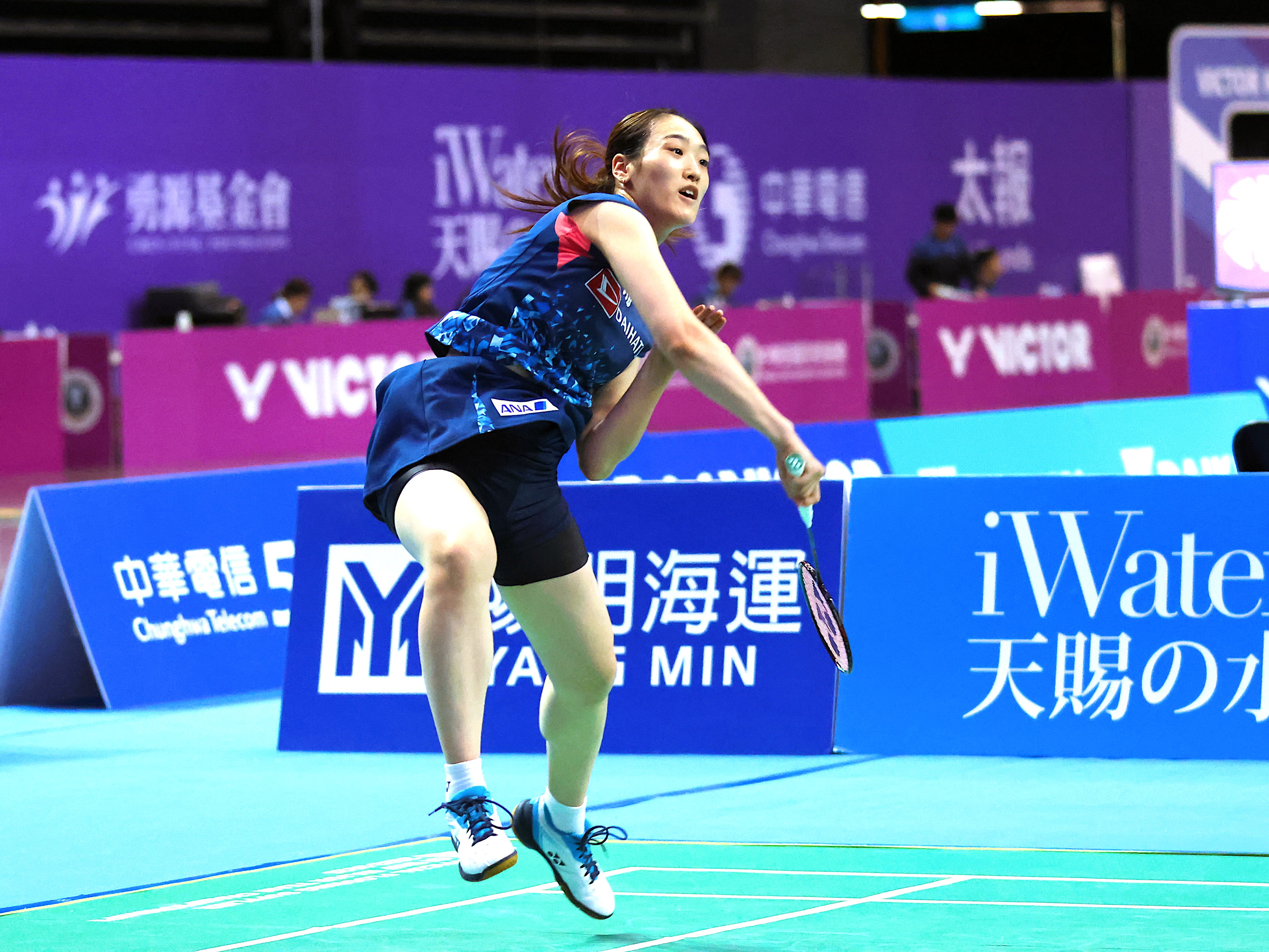
- Takahashi at the 2023 Kaohsiung Masters

Personal information
- Born: 13 November 1999 (age 26) Ashikaga, Tochigi, Japan
- Height: 1.65 m (5 ft 5 in)
- Weight: 60 kg (132 lb)

Sport
- Country: Japan
- Sport: Badminton
- Handedness: Right

Women's singles
- Highest ranking: 47 (19 April 2022)
- BWF profile
Medal record
Women's badminton
Representing Japan
Uber Cup
Silver medal – second place	2020 Aarhus	Women's team
World Junior Championships
Bronze medal – third place	2016 Bilbao	Mixed team
Bronze medal – third place	2017 Yogyakarta	Mixed team
Asian Junior Championships
Bronze medal – third place	2016 Bangkok	Mixed team

Asuka Takahashi (髙橋 明日香, Takahashi Asuka; born 13 November 1999) is a Japanese badminton player from Yonex team. She won her first international title at the Estonian International tournament in 2019.

== Achievements ==
=== BWF World Tour (1 runner-up) ===
The BWF World Tour, which was announced on 19 March 2017 and implemented in 2018, is a series of elite badminton tournaments sanctioned by the Badminton World Federation (BWF). The BWF World Tour is divided into levels of World Tour Finals, Super 1000, Super 750, Super 500, Super 300 (part of the HSBC World Tour), and the BWF Tour Super 100.

Women's singles
Year	Tournament	Level	Opponent	Score	Result	Ref.
2019	Vietnam Open	Super 100	(China) Zhang Yiman	18–21, 11–21	(silver) Runner-up	

=== BWF International Challenge/Series (3 titles, 5 runners-up) ===
Women's singles
Year	Tournament	Opponent	Score	Result	Ref.
2018	Vietnam International	(Indonesia) Dinar Dyah Ayustine	21–13, 16–21, 14–21	(silver) Runner-up	
2019	Estonian International	(Japan) Hirari Mizui	8–21, 21–17, 21–11	(gold) Winner	
2019	Swedish Open	(Japan) Mako Urushizaki	21–23, 19–21	(silver) Runner-up	
2019	Indonesia International	(Japan) Hirari Mizui	21–16, 21–15	(gold) Winner	
2019	Malaysia International	(China) Wang Zhiyi	21–12, 17–21, 16–21	(silver) Runner-up	
2023	Thailand International	(Vietnam) Nguyễn Thùy Linh	21–17, 21–17	(gold) Winner	
2023	Vietnam International	(Vietnam) Nguyễn Thùy Linh	7–21, 21–15, 12–21	(silver) Runner-up	
2024	Saipan International	(Japan) Riko Gunji	14–21, 21–14, 16–21	(silver) Runner-up	

BWF International Challenge tournament
BWF International Series tournament
