= Kim Ga-eun (badminton) =

South Korean badminton player (born 1998)

Personal information
- Born: 7 February 1998 (age 28) Ulsan, South Korea
- Years active: 2015–present
- Height: 1.72 m (5 ft 8 in)

Sport
- Country: South Korea
- Sport: Badminton
- Handedness: Right

Women's singles
- Career record: 194 wins, 123 losses
- Highest ranking: 12 (19 December 2023)
- Current ranking: 13 (13 October 2026)
- BWF profile
Medal record
Women's badminton
Representing South Korea
Sudirman Cup
Silver medal – second place	2023 Suzhou	Mixed team
Bronze medal – third place	2021 Vantaa	Mixed team
Uber Cup
Gold medal – first place	2022 Bangkok	Women's team
Gold medal – first place	2026 Horsens	Women's team
Bronze medal – third place	2020 Aarhus	Women's team
Asian Games
Gold medal – first place	2022 Hangzhou	Women's team
Bronze medal – third place	2026 Aichi–Nagoya	Women's team
Asia Mixed Team Championships
Silver medal – second place	2017 Ho Chi Minh	Mixed team
Silver medal – second place	2023 Dubai	Mixed team
Asia Team Championships
Gold medal – first place	2026 Qingdao	Women's team
Silver medal – second place	2020 Manila	Women's team
World Junior Championships
Bronze medal – third place	2016 Bilbao	Girls' singles
Bronze medal – third place	2016 Bilbao	Girls' doubles
Asian Junior Championships
Silver medal – second place	2014 Taipei	Mixed team
Silver medal – second place	2015 Bangkok	Mixed team
Silver medal – second place	2016 Bangkok	Mixed team
Bronze medal – third place	2016 Bangkok	Girls' singles

- Kim Ga-eun
- Hangul: 김가은
- Hanja: 金佳恩
- RR: Gim Gaeun
- MR: Kim Kaŭn

Kim Ga-eun (Korean: 김가은; born 7 February 1998) is a South Korean badminton player. She was part of Korea winning team in the 2022 Asian Games, as well at the 2022 and 2026 Uber Cup. Kim competed and at the Summer Youth Olympics in 2014, in Nanjing, China, and in 2016, Kim was selected to join the Korean national team. She also competed at the 2020 Tokyo Olympics and the 2024 Paris Olympics.

== Achievements ==
=== BWF World Junior Championships ===
Girls' singles
Year	Venue	Opponent	Score	Result
2016	Bilbao Arena; Bilbao, Spain	(China) Chen Yufei	12–21, 17–21	Bronze

Girls' doubles
Year	Venue	Partner	Opponent	Score	Result
2016	Bilbao Arena; Bilbao, Spain	(South Korea) Kim Hyang-im	(China) Du Yue (China) Xu Ya	15–21, 8–21	Bronze

=== Asian Junior Championships ===
Girls' singles
Year	Venue	Opponent	Score	Result
2016	CPB Badminton Training Center; Bangkok, Thailand	(China) Chen Yufei	Walkover	Bronze

=== BWF World Tour (5 titles, 3 runners-up) ===
The BWF World Tour, which was announced on 19 March 2017 and implemented in 2018, is a series of elite badminton tournaments sanctioned by the Badminton World Federation (BWF). The BWF World Tour is divided into levels of World Tour Finals, Super 1000, Super 750, Super 500, Super 300 (part of the HSBC World Tour), and the BWF Tour Super 100.

Women's singles
Year	Tournament	Level	Opponent	Score	Result
2018	Lingshui China Masters	Super 100	(China) Li Xuerui	21–16, 16–21, 18–21	(silver) Runner-up
2018	Hyderabad Open	Super 100	(Hong Kong) Joy Xuan Deng	21–9, 18–21, 21–17	(gold) Winner
2019	Lingshui China Masters	Super 100	(China) Zhang Yiman	22–20, 14–21, 21–17	(gold) Winner
2019	U.S. Open	Super 300	(China) Wang Zhiyi	18–21, 19–21	(silver) Runner-up
2023	Australian Open	Super 500	(United States) Beiwen Zhang	22–20, 16–21, 8–21	(silver) Runner-up
2023	Korea Masters	Super 300	(Japan) Tomoka Miyazaki	19–21, 21–17, 21–12	(gold) Winner
2024	Korea Open	Super 500	(China) Wang Zhiyi	Walkover	(gold) Winner
2026	Macau Open	Super 300	(South Korea) Park Ga-eun	21–16, 21–13	(gold) Winner

=== BWF International Challenge/Series (2 runners-up) ===
Women's singles
Year	Tournament	Opponent	Score	Result
2018	Norwegian International	(South Korea) Sim Yu-jin	8–21, 21–18, 16–21	(silver) Runner-up
2018	Irish Open	(South Korea) An Se-young	24–26, 17–21	(silver) Runner-up

BWF International Challenge tournament
BWF International Series tournament
BWF Future Series tournament
