= 2022 Thomas Cup qualification =

Tournament details
- Dates: 14–20 February 2022
- Venue: BA: Setia City Convention Centre; BCA: Lugogo Arena; BE: Lahti Energia Arena; BO: Badminton North Harbour Center; BPA: Mundo Imperial
- Location: BA: Selangor, Malaysia; BCA: Kampala, Uganda; BE: Lahti, Finland; BO: Auckland, New Zealand; BPA: Acapulco, Mexico

The 2022 Thomas Cup qualification process is a series of tournaments organised by the five BWF confederations to decide 14 of the 16 teams which will play in the 2022 Thomas Cup, with Thailand qualifying automatically as hosts, and Indonesia qualifying automatically as trophy holder.

== Qualification process ==
The number of teams participating in the final tournament is 16. The allocation of slots for each confederation is the same allocation from 2016 tournament; 4 from each Asia and Europe, and 1 from each Africa, Oceania and Pan Am. Two automatic qualifiers are the host and defending champion. The remaining quota will be filled by world team ranking.

=== Qualified teams ===
Country	Confederation	Qualified as	Qualified on	World Team Rankings	Final appearance
Thailand	Badminton Asia	Host country	29 November 2018	9th	15th
Indonesia	Badminton Asia	2020 Thomas Cup winners	17 October 2021	1st	29th
Algeria	Badminton Africa	2022 All Africa Team Championships winners	17 February 2022	28th	3rd
Malaysia	Badminton Asia	2022 Asia Team Championships winners	17 February 2022	6th	29th
South Korea	Badminton Asia	2022 Asia Team Championships semifinalists	18 February 2022	8th	20th
Singapore	Badminton Asia	2022 Asia Team Championships semifinalists	18 February 2022	17th	3rd
Canada	Badminton Pan Am	2022 Pan Am Male Cup winners	20 February 2022	14th	8th
Denmark	Badminton Europe	Best ranking (Europe)	22 February 2022	3rd	32nd
France	Badminton Europe	Best ranking (Europe)	22 February 2022	10th	5th
England	Badminton Europe	Best ranking (Europe)	22 February 2022	12th	15th
Germany	Badminton Europe	Best ranking (Europe)	22 February 2022	13th	11th
New Zealand	Badminton Oceania	Best ranking (Oceania)	22 February 2022	38th	8th
Japan	Badminton Asia	Best ranking (Asia)^{1}	22 February 2022	2nd	16th
Chinese Taipei	Badminton Asia	Best ranking (overall)	22 February 2022	4th	5th
India	Badminton Asia	Best ranking (overall)	22 February 2022	5th	13th
China	Badminton Asia	Best ranking (overall)	22 February 2022	7th	21st

- ^1 Since Indonesia, one of the semifinalists for Asian qualification tournament had already qualified as title holder, hence the spot is given to the best Asian team from World Team Ranking.

== Confederation qualification ==
=== Badminton Confederation of Africa ===
The qualification for the African teams was held from 14 to 17 February 2022, at the Lugogo Arena, in Kampala, Uganda. The winners of the African qualification will qualified for the Thomas Cup.

==== Teams in contention ====
Teams qualified for the Group stage

- Algeria
- Benin
- Cameroon
- Egypt
- Mauritius
- Réunion
- South Africa
- Uganda
- Zambia
- Zimbabwe

==== First round (group stage) ====
Advance to Knockout stage

Group A

Pos	Team	Pld	Pts
1	Mauritius	2	2
2	Zambia	2	1
3	Zimbabwe	2	0

Source: TS
Group B

Pos	Team	Pld	Pts
1	Algeria	3	3
2	Réunion	3	2
3	Uganda (H)	3	1
4	Benin	3	0

Source: TS
(H) Host
Group C

Pos	Team	Pld	Pts
1	Egypt	2	2
2	South Africa	2	1
3	Cameroon	2	0

Source: TS

==== Second round (knockout stage) ====
Quarter-finals
Egypt
Bye
16 February 14:00
South Africa	3
Zambia	1
16 February 14:00
Réunion	2
Mauritius	3
Algeria
Bye

Semi-finals
17 February 9:00
Egypt	3
South Africa	1
17 February 9:00
Mauritius	0
Algeria	3

Final
17 February 16:30
Egypt	0
Algeria	3

=== Badminton Asia ===
The qualification for the Asian teams was held from 15 to 20 February 2022, at the Setia City Convention Centre in Shah Alam, Selangor, Malaysia. The semifinalist of the Asian qualification will qualified for the Thomas Cup. Indonesia qualified automatically as trophy holder .

==== Teams in contention ====
Teams qualified for the Group stage

- Hong Kong
- India
- Indonesia
- Japan
- Kazakhstan
- South Korea
- Malaysia
- Singapore

==== First round (group stage) ====
Advance to Knockout stage

Group A

Pos	Team	Pld	Pts
1	Indonesia	3	3
2	South Korea	3	2
3	India	3	1
4	Hong Kong	3	0

Source: TS
Group B

Pos	Team	Pld	Pts
1	Malaysia (H)	3	3
2	Singapore	3	2
3	Japan	3	1
4	Kazakhstan	3	0

Source: TS
(H) Host

==== Second round (knockout stage) ====
Semi-finals
19 February 16:00
Indonesia (1)	3
Singapore	2
19 February 16:00
South Korea	0
Malaysia	3

Final
20 February 16:00
Indonesia (1)	0
Malaysia	3

=== Badminton Europe ===
The 2022 European Men’s & Women’s Team Championships were cancelled due to Covid-19. Therefore, the qualification for European teams are through World Ranking. The best four of the European men's team rankings will qualified for the Thomas Cup.

=== Badminton Oceania ===
The 2022 Oceania Badminton Team Championships were cancelled due to Covid-19. Therefore, the qualification for Oceania teams are through World Ranking. The best one of the Oceania team rankings will qualified for the Thomas Cup.

=== Badminton Pan Am ===
The qualification for the Pan Am teams was held from 17 to 20 February 2022, at the Mundo Imperial in Acapulco, Mexico. The winner of the Pan Am qualification will qualified for the Thomas Cup.

==== Teams in contention ====
Teams qualified for the Group stage

- Brazil
- Canada
- Guatemala
- Mexico
- Peru
- United States

==== First round (group stage) ====
Advance to First to fourth place

Group A

Pos	Team	Pld	Pts
1	Canada	2	2
2	United States	2	1
3	Guatemala	2	0

Source: TS
Group B

Pos	Team	Pld	Pts
1	Brazil	2	2
2	Mexico	2	1
3	Peru	2	0

Source: TS

==== Second round (knockout stage) ====
Semi-finals
19 February
Canada	3
Mexico	1
19 February
United States	0
Brazil	3

Final
20 February
Canada	3
Brazil	2
Third place
20 February
Mexico	3
United States	0

== World team rankings ==
=== Summary of qualification ===
Below is the chart of the BWF World Team Ranking calculated by adding World Ranking points of top three Men's Singles players and top two Men's Doubles pairs on 22 February 2022.

Rank	Conf.	Nation	Points	Continental results	Qualification status
1	BA	Indonesia	431,649	Runner-up	Qualified as trophy holder
2	BA	Japan	418,683	Group stage	Qualified by ranking (Asia)
3	BE	Denmark	406,365		Qualified by ranking (Europe)
4	BA	Chinese Taipei	332,690		Qualified by ranking (overall)
5	BA	India	312,538	Group stage	Qualified by ranking (overall)
6	BA	Malaysia	307,083	Winner	Qualified as the winner of BA
7	BA	China	302,790		Qualified by ranking (overall)
8	BA	South Korea	229,664	Semifinals	Qualified as BA semifinalists
9	BA	Thailand	223,912		Qualified as host country
10	BE	France	208,062		Qualified by ranking (Europe)
11	BA	Hong Kong	202,041	Group stage	
12	BE	England	181,180		Qualified by ranking (Europe)
13	BE	Germany	168,833		Qualified by ranking (Europe)
14	BPA	Canada	162,875	Winner	Qualified as the winner of BPA
15	BE	Netherlands	148,671		
16	BE	Russia	147,798		
17	BA	Singapore	131,984	Semifinals	Qualified as BA semifinalists
18	BPA	Guatemala	97,107	5th place	
19	BPA	United States	94,571	4th place	
20	BE	Spain	93,963		
21	BPA	Mexico	90,686	3rd place	
22	BE	Ireland	90,595		
23	BPA	Brazil	88,365	2nd place	
24	BE	Finland	83,553		
25	BCA	Egypt	79,337	Runner-up	
26	BE	Czech Republic	77,723		
27	BCA	Nigeria	75,066		
28	BCA	Algeria	74,030	Winner	Qualified as the winner of BCA
29	BE	Scotland	73,768		
30	BE	Ukraine	73,295		
31	BE	Sweden	65,990		
32	BE	Austria	65,795		
33	BA	Sri Lanka	63,091		
34	BE	Bulgaria	61,797		
35	BA	Vietnam	60,567		
36	BCA	Mauritius	59,190	Semifinals	
37	BE	Italy	57,355		
38	BO	New Zealand	56,461		Qualified by ranking (Oceania)
39	BE	Belgium	52,785		
40	BE	Poland	52,616		
41	BE	Israel	51,939		
42	BO	Australia	51,285		
43	BE	Switzerland	46,763		
44	BE	Norway	46,233		
45	BE	Azerbaijan	43,857		
46	BE	Turkey	43,193		
47	BCA	South Africa	42,397	Semifinals	
48	BE	Estonia	42,148		
49	BPA	Cuba	39,220		
50	BE	Croatia	37,923		
50+ participants
52	BCA	Uganda	31,712	Group stage	
53	BPA	Peru	30,540	6th Place	
60	BA	Kazakhstan	22,353	Group stage	
67	BCA	Zambia	19,283	Quarterfinals	
71	BCA	Benin	14,549	Group stage	
86	BCA	Cameroon	8,330	Group stage	
92	BCA	Zimbabwe	7,570	Group stage	
95	BCA	Réunion	6,686	Quarterfinals	
