= Aarhus Stadium =

Sports venue in Aarhus, Denmark

Aarhus Stadion Ceres Park
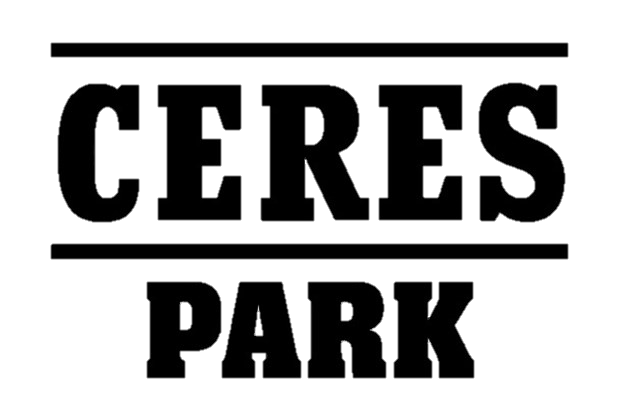
- Naming rights agreement since July 2015

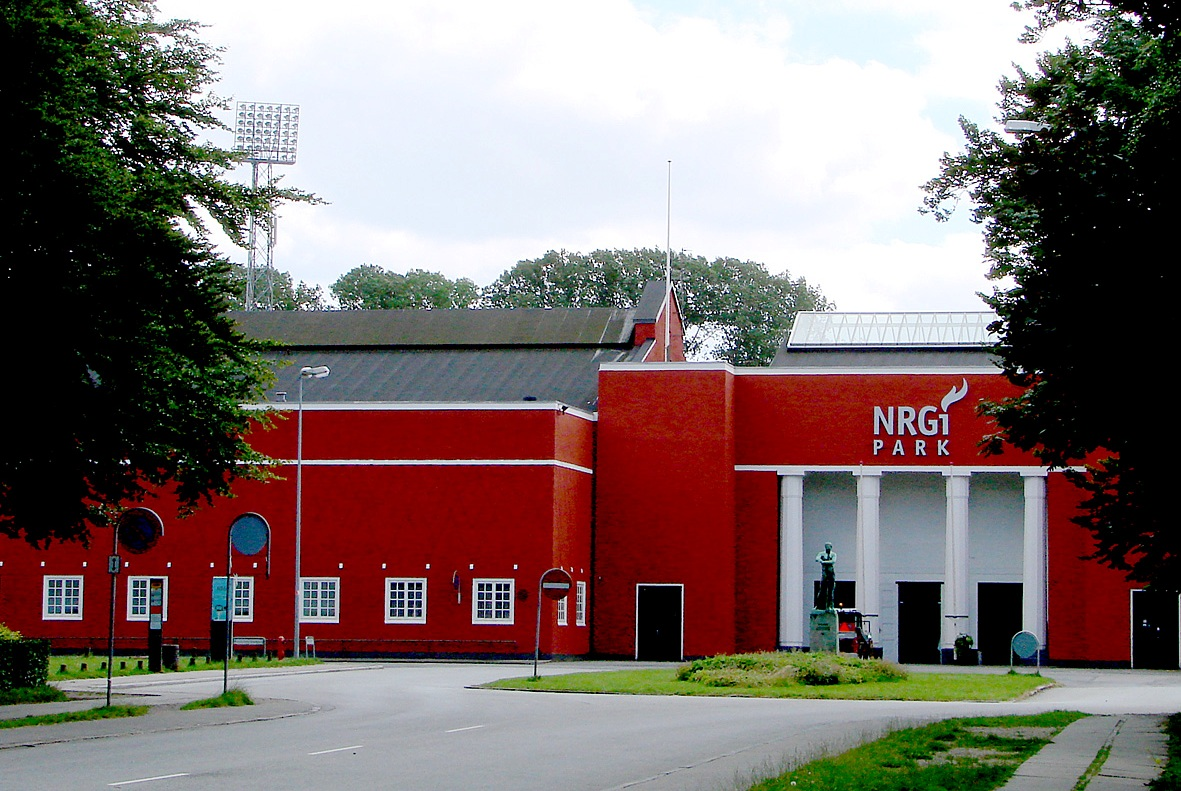
- View from the outside
- Interactive map of Aarhus Stadion; Ceres Park
- Former names: Aarhus Stadion (1920–present); Atletion (2003–2006); NRGi Park (2006–2015); Ceres Park (2015–present)
- Location: Stadion Allé 70; DK-8000 Aarhus C
- Coordinates: 56°07′55″N 10°11′48″E
- Owner: Ceres Park & Arena (AGF)
- Capacity: 19,433
- Surface: Mixto Hybrid grass by Nordisk Kunstgræs Import ApS

Construction
- Groundbreaking: 1916
- Built: 1918–1920
- Opened: 5 June 1920
- Renovated: 1948, 1993, 1998, 2004, 2025–2027
- Architect: Axel Høeg-Hansen (original)

Tenants
- AGF (1920–present); AGF Håndbold; Aarhus 1900; Team Århus Floorball; Denmark national football team (some matches)

Aarhus Stadium (Danish: Aarhus Stadion) known for sponsorship reasons as the Ceres Park is an association football stadium in Aarhus, Denmark which has been the home ground of Aarhus Gymnastikforening since the 1920s. With a current capacity of 19,433, it is the third largest football stadium of any football team in Denmark. It is part of the sports complex, known as Aarhus Sports Park (Danish: Aarhus Idrætspark), that is run by Ceres Park & Arena.

The venue was inaugurated in June 1920 as Aarhus Stadium with major renovations made in the 1990s and 2000s. In recent years, it has been known under several names due to sponsorship arrangements; Atletion (2003–2006), NRGi Park (2006–2015), and in July 2015 it was renamed Ceres Park, when the naming rights for AGF's football matches and events was acquired by Ceres Brewery, a subsidiary of Royal Unibrew. In FIFA and UEFA matches, it is known under its original name, Aarhus Stadium, due to sponsorship restrictions.

== History and development ==
=== Background and inauguration ===
Before the inauguration of Aarhus Sports Park (Danish: "Aarhus Idrætspark"), the city of Aarhus had for a long time lacked modern sports facilities for mainly athletics. In 1914, the idea of a common sports ground in the city began inspired by stadium constructions in Copenhagen and the rest of the Nordic countries. This, however, proved difficult, in regards to agreeing to location as well as economy and scope of construction, which is why the project was abandoned for some time.

When the director of Aarhus Oliefabrik A/S, Frederik Lausen, was elected chairman of Aarhus Gymnastikforening (AGF) in 1916, the project was resumed with new momentum. A location in the Marselisborg Forests in the area around Friheden was agreed upon, and the design was laid in the hands of engineer T. Engquist and architect Axel Høeg-Hansen. Now, a determined effort was made towards realising architectural and sporting plans in one master plan that also included the construction of Stadion Allé, a central street cutting through the borough of Frederiksbjerg and ending at the central piece of the sports park, Aarhus Stadium. The construction of the sports park was approved by the Aarhus City Council on 16 May 1918. The construction area was a gift from the city and during the construction of the indoor arena, today known as Ceres Arena, adjacent to the stadium, the wooden arch structure from Copenhagen's second Central Station, which had been constructed in the years 1863–64 and designed by architect Johan Daniel Herholdt, was reused in this new context. The arch had become available as a new central station was being constructed in Copenhagen. To finance the sports park, the municipality contributed DKK 280,000, while the remaining DKK 380,000 was collected from private investors. Frederik Lausen, the chairman of AGF, was responsible for a large part of this private financing. The stadium was inaugurated on 5 June 1920, the Danish Constitution Day, with the participation of King Christian X of Denmark and his spouse, Alexandrine of Mecklenburg-Schwerin. The first international match at the stadium was marked by pouring rain, as Denmark faced Finland on 27 September 1925.

=== Expansion and renovations ===
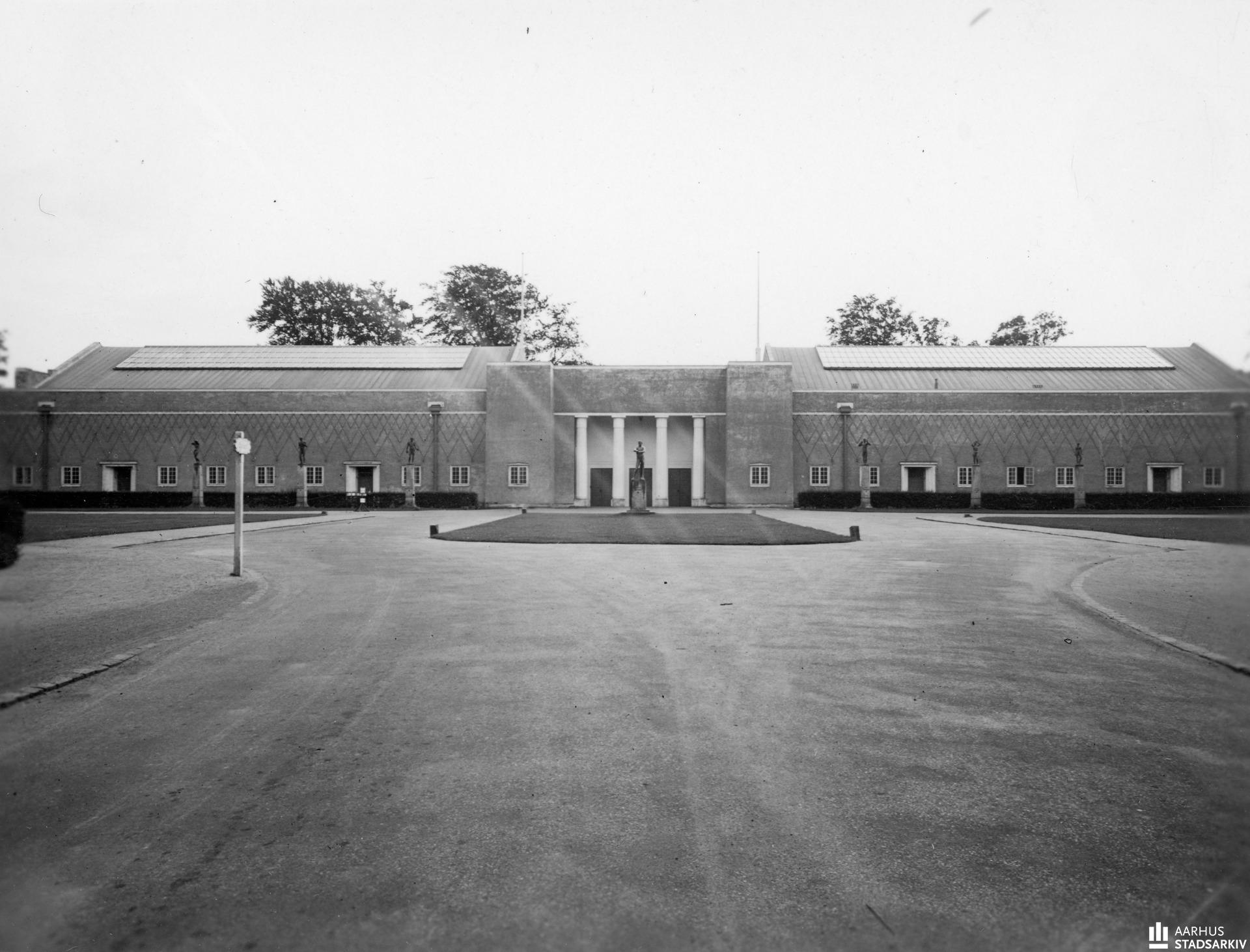
Aarhus Idrætspark. June 1920. Photo: Stadsingeniørens Kontor.

Since its inauguration in 1920, Aarhus Stadium has undergone several extensive renovations and expansions; all made in harmony with Høeg-Hansen's original red and white neoclassicist style. In 1971, a modern athletics facility was established, which was Northern Europe's first with polyurethane covering all tracks. In the following years, 1972–73, people began to politically consider the construction of a modern and more contemporary indoor arena for sporting events and music concerts. However, a long time passed between the decision-in-principle was reached in 1980 and the actual implementation of the plans. In the meantime, a new Team Danmark centre was built at the stadium in 1991. In 1997, the Copenhagen-based architectural firm BBP Arkitekterne was named the winner of the architectural competition which the municipality had announced with the objective of constructing a new indoor arena. An extensive rebuilding of the stadium was also included in the plans. Between 1993 and 2001, the construction of the arena, the completion of a new athletics facility and the stadium project itself took place.

With the extensive project reaching its conclusion, Aarhus Sports Park now possessed an arena with a glass-covered entrance and a spectator capacity of 5,000, as well as a new stadium grandstand divided into two decks with its entrances to the surrounding forest, a transparent canopy and seating capacities for 16,500 spectators – a capacity which was immediately expanded to 20,032 seats. This meant that Aarhus had the largest stadium outside the Capital Region. The project was budgeted at DKK 250 million, but this budget was later found to have been exceeded by DKK 48 million.

Since then, an expansion of the VIP facilities has decreased the total capacity to 19,433.

== Reconstruction ==
A new project initiated by Aarhus Municipality named Vision Kongelunden, which included plans of constructing a new stadium in Aarhus, received a potential donation of DKK 500 million by Salling Fonden and Lind Invest in December 2019.

On 13 December 2022, it was announced that globally acclaimed, London-based Zaha Hadid Architects had won the competition in a partnership with Sweco of Sweden in charge of construction and Copenhagen-based Tredje Natur of landscaping. The two runners-up projects had been led by Dorte Mandrup & Co., and Cobe (architectural firm).

On 8 December 2024, the last game on the old Ceres Park was played, with a 1–0 win against rivals Brøndby I.F. in the first quarter final of the Danish Cup. The demolition, which had been partly initiated in autumn 2024, advanced from there on, with AGF reassuming the last part of the season at their temporary home grounds, Vejlby Stadium, in the spring of 2025.

The new stadium was expected to reach its completion in 2026, but construction and budget issues delayed the process until early 2027. Previous to the project presentation in 2019, talks of a new stadium had been ongoing for years, as Aarhus Stadium had been criticised for being outdated and due to the stands' distance to the pitch.

== Matches ==
On 27 May 2006, the Denmark national football team played a friendly against Paraguay at Aarhus Stadium. This was the first national home match not played in Parken in Copenhagen since 1992.

In 2007, the stadium hosted two of Denmark's Euro 2008 qualifying matches against Liechtenstein and Spain after UEFA ordered the matches played away from Copenhagen following a fan attack in the previous match against Sweden.

In 2011, Aarhus Stadium hosted the final of the 2011 UEFA European Under-21 Football Championship. Three group stage matches were also played at the stadium.

In 2018, the stadium hosted Denmark's two group stage matches of the 2018–19 UEFA Nations League against Wales and Republic of Ireland.

== Concert venue and other uses ==
The park has hosted concerts by many famous artists, including Cliff Richard, Phil Collins, Elton John, AC/DC, Depeche Mode, The Eagles and George Michael, among others.

== Gallery ==
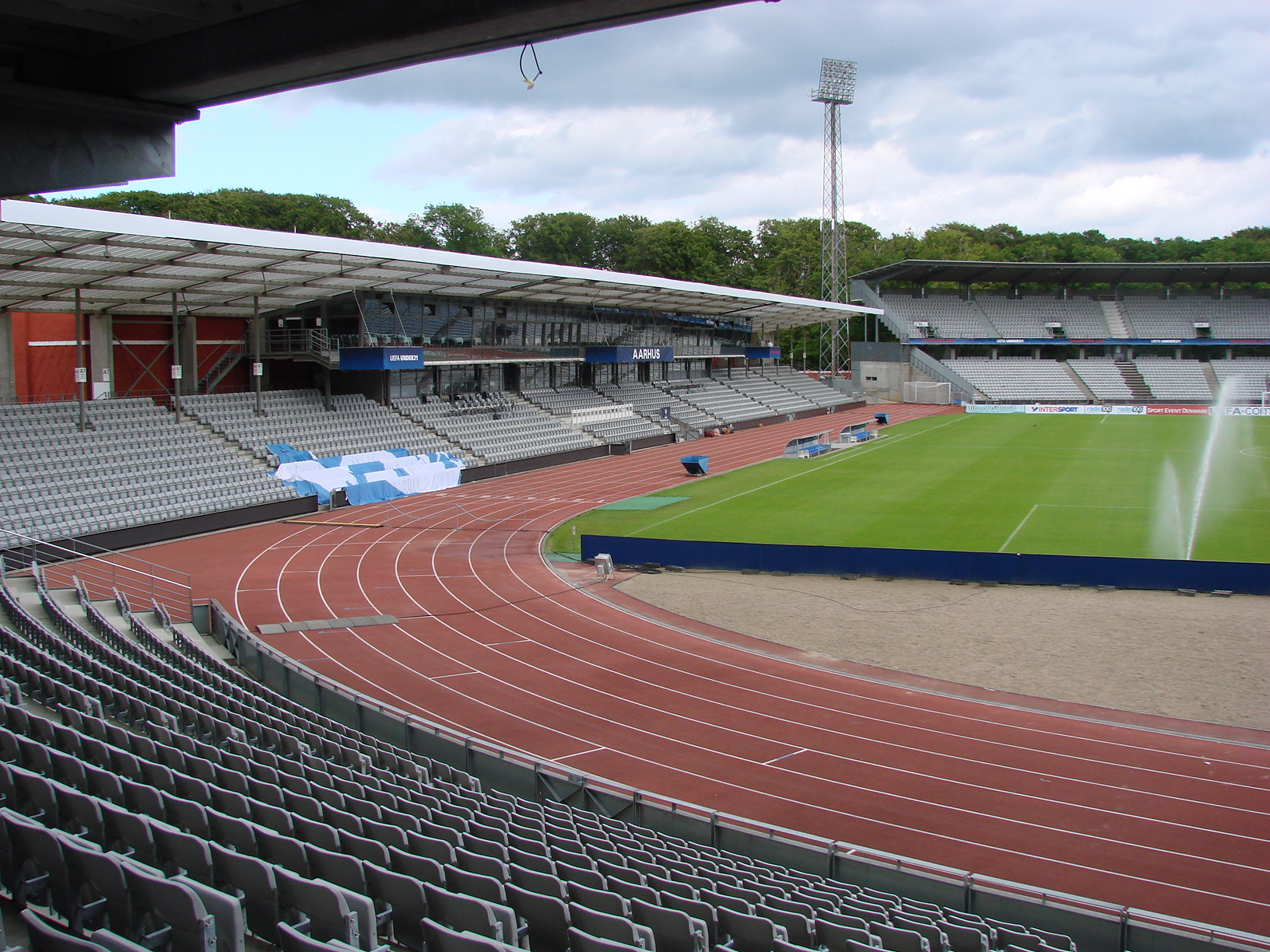
Ceres Park stadium (2001–2025)

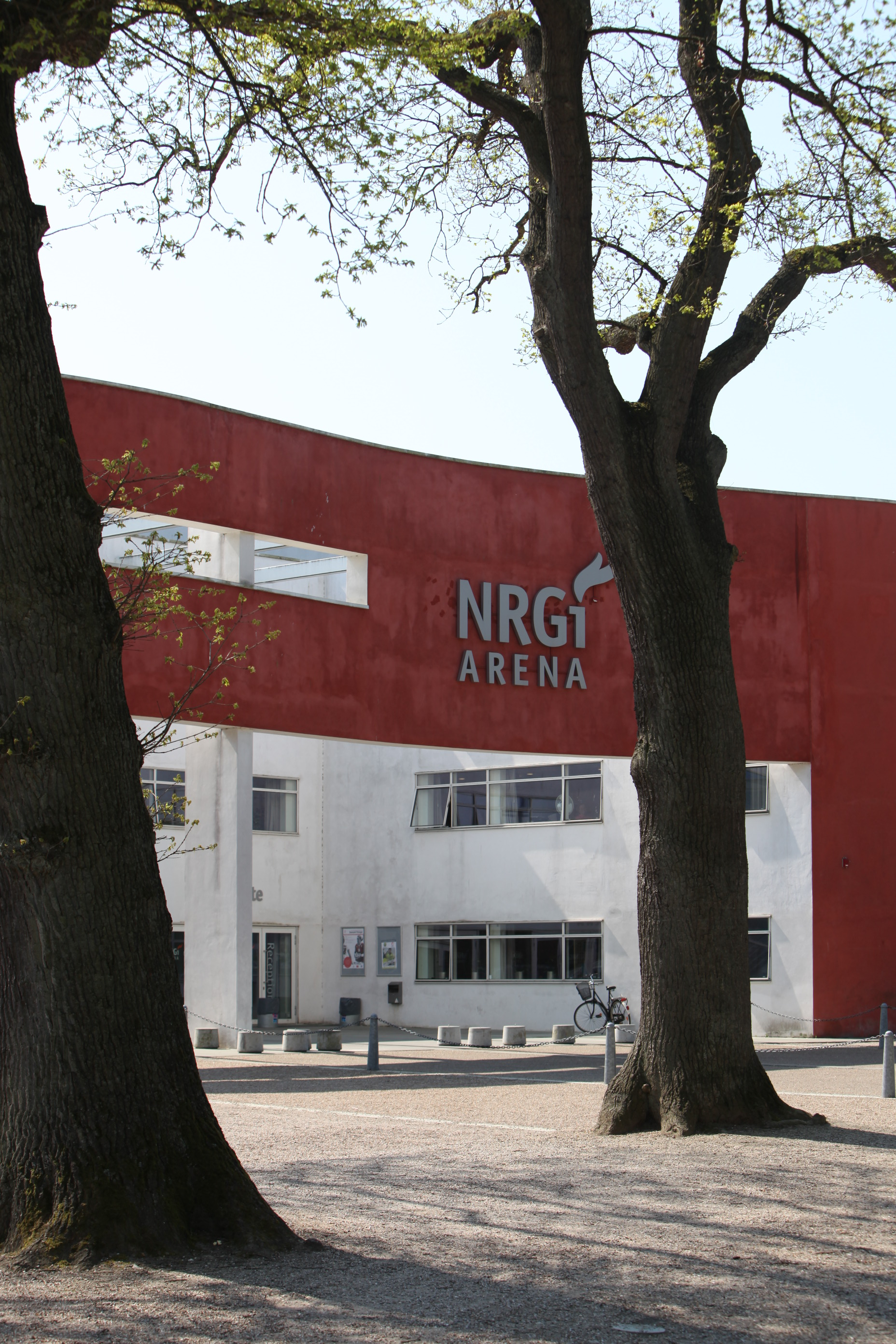
Ceres Arena

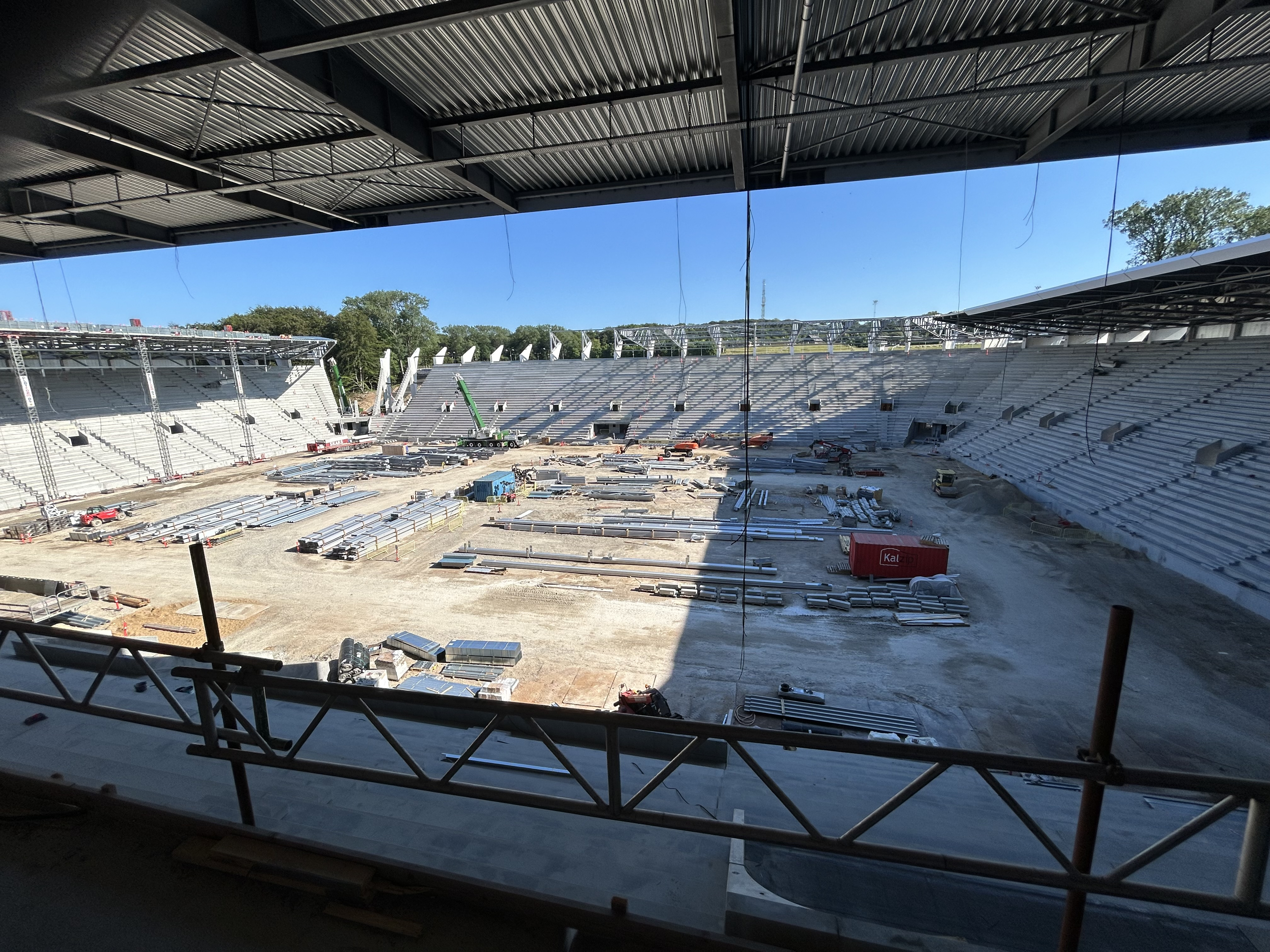
Construction of The New Stadium in Aarhus in June 2026

== See also ==
- Aarhus Sports Park
- Aarhus Gymnastikforening
