= 2020 Uber Cup group stage =

Badminton tournament

The 2020 Uber Cup group stage was held at the Ceres Arena in Aarhus, Denmark, from 9 to 13 October 2021.

The group stage was the first stage of the 2020 Uber Cup. The two highest-placing teams in each group advanced to the knockout stage.

== Draw ==
The original draw for the tournament was conducted on 3 August 2020, at 15:00 MST, at BWF Headquarters in Kuala Lumpur. BWF then decided to redraw the tournament after the postponement from 2020 to 2021 this time to be conducted on 18 August 2021, at 15:00 MST also at the BWF headquarters in Kuala Lumpur. The 16 teams were drawn to four groups of four and were allocated to three pots based on the World Team Rankings of 18 February 2021.

Pot 1	Pot 2	Pot 3
Japan; China; South Korea; Thailand	Indonesia; Chinese Taipei; India; Denmark	Malaysia; Canada; France; Germany Spain; Tahiti; Egypt; Scotland

=== Group composition ===
Group
Group A	Group B	Group C	Group D
Japan; Indonesia; Germany; France	Thailand; India; Spain; Scotland	Korea; Chinese Taipei; Tahiti; Egypt	China; Denmark (Host); Malaysia; Canada

== Group A ==
Pos	Team	Pld	W	L	GF	GA	GD	PF	PA	PD	Pts	Qualification
1	Japan	3	3	0	30	0	+30	631	341	+290	3	Advance to quarter-finals
2	Indonesia	3	2	1	18	14	+4	571	541	+30	2	Advance to quarter-finals
3	France	3	1	2	8	24	−16	458	613	−155	1	
4	Germany	3	0	3	7	25	−18	471	636	−165	0	

Source: Tournament Software
Rules for classification: Tiebreakers

=== Indonesia vs Germany ===
Indonesia
4
Ceres Arena Court 3
9 October 2021, 8:30 UTC+2

Germany
1

			1	2	3
1	(Indonesia) (Germany)	Gregoria Mariska Tunjung; Yvonne Li	21; 10	21; 14
2	(Indonesia) (Germany)	Greysia Polii / Apriyani Rahayu; Stine Küspert / Emma Moszczyński	21; 16	21; 17
3	(Indonesia) (Germany)	Putri Kusuma Wardani; Ann-Kathrin Spöri	21; 11	21; 17
4	(Indonesia) (Germany)	Siti Fadia Silva Ramadhanti / Ribka Sugiarto; Annabella Jäger / Leona Michalski	21; 9	21; 8
5	(Indonesia) (Germany)	Ester Nurumi Tri Wardoyo; Thuc Phuong Nguyen	18; 21	21; 17	14; 21

=== Japan vs France ===
Japan
5
Ceres Arena Court 1
9 October 2021, 13:30 UTC+2

France
0

			1	2	3
1	(Japan) (France)	Sayaka Takahashi; Marie Batomene	21; 13	21; 10
2	(Japan) (France)	Yuki Fukushima / Misaki Matsutomo; Delphine Delrue / Léa Palermo	6; 5			retired
3	(Japan) (France)	Aya Ohori; Léonice Huet	21; 15	21; 9
4	(Japan) (France)	Mayu Matsumoto / Nami Matsuyama; Margot Lambert / Anne Tran	21; 10	21; 9
5	(Japan) (France)	Asuka Takahashi; Anna Tatranova	21; 9	21; 4

=== Indonesia vs France ===
Indonesia
4
Ceres Arena Court 1
11 October 2021, 8:30 UTC+2

France
1

			1	2	3
1	(Indonesia) (France)	Gregoria Mariska Tunjung; Marie Batomene	21; 18	21; 13
2	(Indonesia) (France)	Putri Kusuma Wardani; Léonice Huet	21; 9	21; 8
3	(Indonesia) (France)	Apriyani Rahayu / Putri Syaikah; Margot Lambert / Anne Tran	21; 13	21; 10
4	(Indonesia) (France)	Nandini Putri Arumni; Yaëlle Hoyaux	12; 21	21; 16	17; 20	retired
5	(Indonesia) (France)	Siti Fadia Silva Ramadhanti / Ribka Sugiarto; Marie Batomene / Delphine Delrue	23; 21	22; 20

=== Japan vs Germany ===
Japan
5
Ceres Arena Court 2
11 October 2021, 13:30 UTC+2

Germany
0

			1	2	3
1	(Japan) (Germany)	Akane Yamaguchi; Yvonne Li	21; 17	22; 20
2	(Japan) (Germany)	Yuki Fukushima / Misaki Matsutomo; Linda Efler / Isabel Lohau	21; 13	21; 8
3	(Japan) (Germany)	Sayaka Takahashi; Ann-Kathrin Spöri	21; 9	21; 10
4	(Japan) (Germany)	Mayu Matsumoto / Nami Matsuyama; Stine Küspert / Emma Moszczyński	21; 15	21; 15
5	(Japan) (Germany)	Asuka Takahashi; Antonia Schaller	21; 6	21; 15

=== Japan vs Indonesia ===
Japan
5
Ceres Arena Court 2
12 October 2021, 13:30 UTC+2

Indonesia
0

			1	2	3
1	(Japan) (Indonesia)	Akane Yamaguchi; Gregoria Mariska Tunjung	21; 7	21; 16
2	(Japan) (Indonesia)	Mayu Matsumoto / Nami Matsuyama; Siti Fadia Silva Ramadhanti / Ribka Sugiarto	21; 14	21; 19
3	(Japan) (Indonesia)	Sayaka Takahashi; Putri Kusuma Wardani	21; 14	21; 19
4	(Japan) (Indonesia)	Yuki Fukushima / Arisa Higashino; Nita Violina Marwah / Putri Syaikah	21; 9	21; 10
5	(Japan) (Indonesia)	Aya Ohori; Ester Nurumi Tri Wardoyo	21; 14	21; 7

=== Germany vs France ===
Germany
2
Ceres Arena Court 3
12 October 2021, 13:30 UTC+2

France
3

			1	2	3
1	(Germany) (France)	Yvonne Li; Marie Batomene	21; 17	21; 11
2	(Germany) (France)	Ann-Kathrin Spöri; Léonice Huet	12; 21	17; 21
3	(Germany) (France)	Linda Efler / Isabel Lohau; Margot Lambert / Anne Tran	14; 21	21; 14	8; 21
4	(Germany) (France)	Antonia Schaller; Yaëlle Hoyaux	14; 21	12; 21
5	(Germany) (France)	Stine Küspert / Emma Moszczyński; Marie Batomene / Delphine Delrue	21; 16	21; 19

== Group B ==
Pos	Team	Pld	W	L	GF	GA	GD	PF	PA	PD	Pts	Qualification
1	Thailand	3	3	0	30	1	+29	648	374	+274	3	Advance to quarter-finals
2	India	3	2	1	16	17	−1	584	546	+38	2	Advance to quarter-finals
3	Spain	3	1	2	10	22	−12	457	606	−149	1	
4	Scotland	3	0	3	8	24	−16	445	608	−163	0	

Source: Tournament Software
Rules for classification: Tiebreakers

=== India vs Spain ===
India
3
Ceres Arena Court 1
10 October 2021, 8:30 UTC+2

Spain
2

			1	2	3
1	(India) (Spain)	Saina Nehwal; Clara Azurmendi	20; 22			retired
2	(India) (Spain)	Malvika Bansod; Beatriz Corrales	21; 13	21; 15
3	(India) (Spain)	Tanisha Crasto / Rutaparna Panda; Paula López / Lorena Uslé	21; 10	21; 8
4	(India) (Spain)	Aditi Bhatt; Ania Setién	21; 16	21; 14
5	(India) (Spain)	Ashwini Ponnappa / N. Sikki Reddy; Clara Azurmendi / Beatriz Corrales	18; 21	21; 14	17; 21

=== Thailand vs Scotland ===
Thailand
5
Ceres Arena Court 2
10 October 2021, 8:30 UTC+2

Scotland
0

			1	2	3
1	(Thailand) (Scotland)	Pornpawee Chochuwong; Kirsty Gilmour	21; 16	21; 10
2	(Thailand) (Scotland)	Jongkolphan Kititharakul / Rawinda Prajongjai; Julie MacPherson / Ciara Torrance	21; 13	21; 17
3	(Thailand) (Scotland)	Busanan Ongbamrungphan; Rachel Sugden	21; 8	21; 11
4	(Thailand) (Scotland)	Puttita Supajirakul / Sapsiree Taerattanachai; Rachel Andrew / Eleanor O'Donnell	21; 8	21; 10
5	(Thailand) (Scotland)	Phittayaporn Chaiwan; Lauren Middleton	21; 12	21; 3

=== Thailand vs Spain ===
Thailand
5
Ceres Arena Court 1
12 October 2021, 8:30 UTC+2

Spain
0

			1	2	3
1	(Thailand) (Spain)	Pornpawee Chochuwong; Clara Azurmendi	21; 9	21; 15
2	(Thailand) (Spain)	Busanan Ongbamrungphan; Lucía Rodríguez	21; 10	21; 13
3	(Thailand) (Spain)	Phittayaporn Chaiwan; Ania Setién	21; 8	21; 11
4	(Thailand) (Spain)	Puttita Supajirakul / Sapsiree Taerattanachai; Nerea Ivorra / Claudia Leal	21; 7	21; 4
5	(Thailand) (Spain)	Jongkolphan Kititharakul / Rawinda Prajongjai; Lucía Rodríguez / Ania Setién	21; 7	21; 9

=== India vs Scotland ===
India
4
Ceres Arena Court 3
12 October 2021, 8:30 UTC+2

Scotland
1

			1	2	3
1	(India) (Scotland)	Malvika Bansod; Kirsty Gilmour	13; 21	9; 21
2	(India) (Scotland)	Aditi Bhatt; Rachel Sugden	21; 14	21; 8
3	(India) (Scotland)	Tanisha Crasto / Rutaparna Panda; Julie MacPherson / Ciara Torrance	21; 11	21; 8
4	(India) (Scotland)	Tasnim Mir; Lauren Middleton	21; 15	21; 6
5	(India) (Scotland)	Treesa Jolly / Gayathri Gopichand; Kirsty Gilmour / Eleanor O'Donnell	21; 8	19; 21	21; 10

=== Thailand vs India ===
Thailand
5
Ceres Arena Court 2
13 October 2021, 8:30 UTC+2

India
0

			1	2	3
1	(Thailand) (India)	Pornpawee Chochuwong; Malvika Bansod	21; 15	21; 11
2	(Thailand) (India)	Jongkolphan Kititharakul / Rawinda Prajongjai; Ashwini Ponnappa / N. Sikki Reddy	21; 16	21; 12
3	(Thailand) (India)	Busanan Ongbamrungphan; Aditi Bhatt	21; 16	18; 21	21; 15
4	(Thailand) (India)	Puttita Supajirakul / Sapsiree Taerattanachai; Treesa Jolly / Gayathri Gopichand	21; 17	21; 16
5	(Thailand) (India)	Supanida Katethong; Tasnim Mir	21; 19	21; 15

=== Spain vs Scotland ===
Spain
3
Ceres Arena Court 2
13 October 2021, 13:30 UTC+2

Scotland
2

			1	2	3
1	(Spain) (Scotland)	Clara Azurmendi; Kirsty Gilmour	12; 21	7; 21
2	(Spain) (Scotland)	Beatriz Corrales; Rachel Sugden	19; 21	21; 12	21; 7
3	(Spain) (Scotland)	Lucía Rodríguez; Lauren Middleton	23; 21	21; 17
4	(Spain) (Scotland)	Clara Azurmendi / Beatriz Corrales; Julie MacPherson / Ciara Torrance	9; 21	14; 21
5	(Spain) (Scotland)	Lucía Rodríguez / Ania Setién; Rachel Andrew / Eleanor O'Donnell	21; 14	21; 18

== Group C ==
Pos	Team	Pld	W	L	GF	GA	GD	PF	PA	PD	Pts	Qualification
1	Korea	3	3	0	29	2	+27	649	247	+402	3	Advance to quarter-finals
2	Chinese Taipei	3	2	1	22	9	+13	570	370	+200	2	Advance to quarter-finals
3	Egypt	3	1	2	10	21	−11	379	560	−181	1	
4	Tahiti	3	0	3	1	30	−29	233	654	−421	0	

Source: Tournament Software
Rules for classification: Tiebreakers

=== Korea vs Tahiti ===
Korea
5
Ceres Arena Court 3
9 October 2021, 13:30 UTC+2

Tahiti
0

			1	2	3
1	(South Korea) (French Polynesia)	Kim Ga-eun; Maeva Gaillard	21; 3	21; 4
2	(South Korea) (French Polynesia)	Sim Yu-jin; Mélissa Mi You	21; 1	21; 2
3	(South Korea) (French Polynesia)	Jeon Ju-i; Chloé Segrestan	21; 6	21; 3
4	(South Korea) (French Polynesia)	Kim So-yeong / Kong Hee-yong; Maeva Gaillard / Jenica Lesourd				w/o
5	(South Korea) (French Polynesia)	Chae Yoo-jung / Shin Seung-chan; Heirautea Curet / Chloé Segrestan	21; 9	21; 8

=== Chinese Taipei vs Egypt ===
Chinese Taipei
5
Ceres Arena Court 3
10 October 2021, 8:30 UTC+2

Egypt
0

			1	2	3
1	(Chinese Taipei) (Egypt)	Pai Yu-po; Doha Hany	21; 7	21; 12
2	(Chinese Taipei) (Egypt)	Hung Yi-ting; Nour Ahmed Youssri	21; 5	21; 13
3	(Chinese Taipei) (Egypt)	Yu Chien-hui; Jana Ashraf	21; 4	21; 13
4	(Chinese Taipei) (Egypt)	Hsu Ya-ching / Hu Ling-fang; Rahma Mohamed Saad Eladawy / Hana Tarek	21; 6	21; 5
5	(Chinese Taipei) (Egypt)	Chang Ching-hui / Lee Chih-chen; Nour Ahmed Youssri / Jana Ashraf	21; 9	21; 10

=== Chinese Taipei vs Tahiti ===
Chinese Taipei
5
Ceres Arena Court 2
11 October 2021, 8:30 UTC+2

Tahiti
0

			1	2	3
1	(Chinese Taipei) (French Polynesia)	Pai Yu-po; Maeva Gaillard	21; 6	21; 6
2	(Chinese Taipei) (French Polynesia)	Hung Yi-ting; Mélissa Mi You	21; 4	21; 4
3	(Chinese Taipei) (French Polynesia)	Yu Chien-hui; Heirautea Curet	21; 5	21; 8
4	(Chinese Taipei) (French Polynesia)	Hsu Ya-ching / Hu Ling-fang; Maeva Gaillard / Mélissa Mi You	21; 5	21; 7
5	(Chinese Taipei) (French Polynesia)	Chang Ching-hui / Lee Chih-chen; Heirautea Curet / Chloé Segrestan	21; 8	21; 4

=== Korea vs Egypt ===
Korea
5
Ceres Arena Court 3
11 October 2021, 8:30 UTC+2

Egypt
0

			1	2	3
1	(South Korea) (Egypt)	Kim Ga-eun; Doha Hany	21; 8	21; 6
2	(South Korea) (Egypt)	Sim Yu-jin; Nour Ahmed Youssri	21; 9	21; 7
3	(South Korea) (Egypt)	Jeon Ju-i; Jana Ashraf	21; 3	21; 3
4	(South Korea) (Egypt)	Lee So-hee / Shin Seung-chan; Rahma Mohamed Saad Eladawy / Hana Tarek	21; 7	21; 8
5	(South Korea) (Egypt)	Kim So-yeong / Kong Hee-yong; Nour Ahmed Youssri / Jana Ashraf	21; 6	21; 4

=== Egypt vs Tahiti ===
Egypt
5
Ceres Arena Court 3
13 October 2021, 8:30 UTC+2

Tahiti
0

			1	2	3
1	(Egypt) (French Polynesia)	Doha Hany; Maeva Gaillard	21; 2	21; 8
2	(Egypt) (French Polynesia)	Nour Ahmed Youssri; Chloé Segrestan	21; 15	22; 24	21; 16
3	(Egypt) (French Polynesia)	Jana Ashraf; Heirautea Curet	21; 19	21; 10
4	(Egypt) (French Polynesia)	Nour Ahmed Youssri / Hana Tarek; Maeva Gaillard / Chloé Segrestan	23; 21	21; 13
5	(Egypt) (French Polynesia)	Doha Hany / Rahma Mohamed Saad Eladawy; Heirautea Curet / Mélissa Mi You	21; 5	21; 7

=== Korea vs Chinese Taipei ===
Korea
4
Ceres Arena Court 1
13 October 2021, 13:30 UTC+2

Chinese Taipei
1

			1	2	3
1	(South Korea) (Chinese Taipei)	An Se-young; Pai Yu-po	21; 8	21; 8
2	(South Korea) (Chinese Taipei)	Kim Ga-eun; Hung Yi-ting	21; 16	21; 6
3	(South Korea) (Chinese Taipei)	Sim Yu-jin; Yu Chien-hui	21; 17	21; 14
4	(South Korea) (Chinese Taipei)	Kim So-yeong / Kong Hee-yong; Chang Ching-hui / Lee Chih-chen	21; 8	21; 12
5	(South Korea) (Chinese Taipei)	Chae Yu-jung / Shin Seung-chan; Hsu Ya-ching / Yu Chien-hui	21; 17	19; 21	21; 23

== Group D ==
Pos	Team	Pld	W	L	GF	GA	GD	PF	PA	PD	Pts	Qualification
1	China	3	3	0	30	2	+28	663	395	+268	3	Advance to quarter-finals
2	Denmark (H)	3	2	1	20	15	+5	647	596	+51	2	Advance to quarter-finals
3	Canada	3	1	2	10	23	−13	477	621	−144	1	
4	Malaysia	3	0	3	7	27	−20	490	665	−175	0	

Source: Tournament Software
Rules for classification: Tiebreakers
(H) Host

=== China vs Canada ===
China
5
Ceres Arena Court 2
9 October 2021, 8:30 UTC+2

Canada
0

			1	2	3
1	(China) (Canada)	He Bingjiao; Michelle Li	21; 12			retired
2	(China) (Canada)	Li Wenmei / Zheng Yu; Rachel Honderich / Kristen Tsai	21; 10	21; 13
3	(China) (Canada)	Wang Zhiyi; Rachel Chan	21; 19	21; 13
4	(China) (Canada)	Liu Xuanxuan / Xia Yuting; Catherine Choi / Talia Ng	21; 6	21; 4
5	(China) (Canada)	Han Yue; Wen Yu Zhang	21; 12	21; 7

=== Denmark vs Malaysia ===
Denmark
4
Ceres Arena Court 2
9 October 2021, 13:30 UTC+2

Malaysia
1

			1	2	3
1	(Denmark) (Malaysia)	Mia Blichfeldt; Kisona Selvaduray	21; 11	21; 7
2	(Denmark) (Malaysia)	Maiken Fruergaard / Sara Thygesen; Lee Meng Yean / Thinaah Muralitharan	21; 19	10; 21	21; 13
3	(Denmark) (Malaysia)	Line Christophersen; Eoon Qi Xuan	21; 18	18; 21	15; 21
4	(Denmark) (Malaysia)	Amalie Magelund / Freja Ravn; Teoh Mei Xing / Yap Ling	21; 13	21; 19
5	(Denmark) (Malaysia)	Line Kjærsfeldt; Letshanaa Karupathevan	21; 18	21; 14

=== China vs Malaysia ===
China
5
Ceres Arena Court 2
10 October 2021, 13:30 UTC+2

Malaysia
0

			1	2	3
1	(China) (Malaysia)	Chen Yufei; Eoon Qi Xuan	21; 13	21; 11
2	(China) (Malaysia)	Liu Xuanxuan / Xia Yuting; Lee Meng Yean / Thinaah Muralitharan	21; 12	21; 17
3	(China) (Malaysia)	He Bingjiao; Siti Nurshuhaini	21; 8	21; 3
4	(China) (Malaysia)	Huang Dongping / Jia Yifan; Go Pei Kee / Teoh Mei Xing	21; 9	21; 12
5	(China) (Malaysia)	Wang Zhiyi; Letshanaa Karupathevan	21; 15	21; 11

=== Denmark vs Canada ===
Denmark
4
Ceres Arena Court 1
10 October 2021, 19:00 UTC+2

Canada
1

			1	2	3
1	(Denmark) (Canada)	Mia Blichfeldt; Talia Ng	21; 8	21; 7
2	(Denmark) (Canada)	Maiken Fruergaard / Sara Thygesen; Rachel Honderich / Kristen Tsai	22; 20	21; 16
3	(Denmark) (Canada)	Line Christophersen; Rachel Chan	21; 13	21; 16
4	(Denmark) (Canada)	Alexandra Bøje / Mette Poulsen; Catherine Choi / Crystal Lai	21; 10	21; 10
5	(Denmark) (Canada)	Line Kjærsfeldt; Wen Yu Zhang	21; 15	20; 22	17; 21

=== Malaysia vs Canada ===
Malaysia
1
Ceres Arena Court 3
11 October 2021, 19:00 UTC+2

Canada
4

			1	2	3
1	(Malaysia) (Canada)	Kisona Selvaduray; Talia Ng	9; 21	14; 21
2	(Malaysia) (Canada)	Teoh Mei Xing / Yap Ling; Rachel Honderich / Kristen Tsai	21; 13	10; 21	14; 21
3	(Malaysia) (Canada)	Eoon Qi Xuan; Rachel Chan	12; 21	13; 21
4	(Malaysia) (Canada)	Go Pei Kee / Thinaah Muralitharan; Catherine Choi / Crystal Lai	21; 12	21; 13
5	(Malaysia) (Canada)	Letshanaa Karupathevan; Wen Yu Zhang	21; 17	16; 21	12; 21

=== China vs Denmark ===
China
5
Ceres Arena Court 1
12 October 2021, 19:00 UTC+2

Denmark
0

			1	2	3
1	(China) (Denmark)	He Bingjiao; Line Christophersen	21; 23	21; 13	21; 15
2	(China) (Denmark)	Chen Qingchen / Jia Yifan; Amalie Magelund / Freja Ravn	21; 10	21; 14
3	(China) (Denmark)	Wang Zhiyi; Line Kjærsfeldt	12; 21	21; 15	21; 17
4	(China) (Denmark)	Huang Dongping / Li Wenmei; Alexandra Bøje / Mette Poulsen	21; 19	21; 15
5	(China) (Denmark)	Han Yue; Julie Dawall Jakobsen	21; 17	21; 9
