= 2020 Thomas Cup group stage =

Part of badminton tournament, Denmark

The 2020 Thomas Cup group stage was held at the Ceres Arena in Aarhus, Denmark, from 9 to 14 October 2021.

The group stage was the first stage of the 2020 Thomas Cup. The two highest-placing teams in each group advanced to the knockout stage.

== Draw ==
The original draw for the tournament was conducted on 3 August 2020, at 15:00 MST, at BWF Headquarters in Kuala Lumpur. BWF then decided to redraw the tournament after the postponement from 2020 to 2021 this time to be conducted on 18 August 2021, at 15:00 MST also at the BWF headquarters in Kuala Lumpur. The 16 teams were drawn to four groups of four and were allocated to three pots based on the World Team Rankings of 18 February 2021.

Pot 1	Pot 2	Pot 3
Indonesia; Japan; China; Denmark	Chinese Taipei; India; Malaysia; South Korea	Thailand; England; Germany; Canada France; Netherlands; Tahiti; Algeria

=== Group composition ===
Group
Group A	Group B	Group C	Group D
Indonesia; Chinese Taipei; Algeria; Thailand	Denmark (Host); South Korea; France; Germany	China; India; Netherlands; Tahiti	Japan; Malaysia; Canada; England

== Group A ==
Pos	Team	Pld	W	L	GF	GA	GD	PF	PA	PD	Pts	Qualification
1	Indonesia	3	3	0	25	11	+14	723	570	+153	3	Advance to quarter-finals
2	Thailand	3	2	1	22	12	+10	649	549	+100	2	Advance to quarter-finals
3	Chinese Taipei	3	1	2	20	14	+6	676	597	+79	1	
4	Algeria	3	0	3	0	30	−30	298	630	−332	0	

Source: Tournament Software
Rules for classification: Tiebreakers

=== Chinese Taipei vs Thailand ===
Chinese Taipei
2
Ceres Arena Court 1
9 October 2021, 8:30 UTC+2

Thailand
3

			1	2	3
1	(Chinese Taipei) (Thailand)	Chou Tien-chen; Kantaphon Wangcharoen	21; 18	22; 20
2	(Chinese Taipei) (Thailand)	Lee Yang / Wang Chi-lin; Supak Jomkoh / Tanupat Viriyangkura	21; 15	21; 12
3	(Chinese Taipei) (Thailand)	Wang Tzu-wei; Kunlavut Vitidsarn	22; 24	17; 21
4	(Chinese Taipei) (Thailand)	Lee Jhe-huei / Yang Po-hsuan; Kittinupong Kedren / Dechapol Puavaranukroh	18; 21	17; 21
5	(Chinese Taipei) (Thailand)	Chi Yu-jen; Suppanyu Avihingsanon	21; 11	23; 25	12; 21

=== Indonesia vs Algeria ===
Indonesia
5
Ceres Arena Court 3
9 October 2021, 19:00 UTC+2

Algeria
0

			1	2	3
1	(Indonesia) (Algeria)	Jonatan Christie; Youcef Sabri Medel	21; 8	21; 8
2	(Indonesia) (Algeria)	Shesar Hiren Rhustavito; Mohamed Abderrahime Belarbi	21; 6	21; 12
3	(Indonesia) (Algeria)	Chico Aura Dwi Wardoyo; Adel Hamek	21; 11	21; 6
4	(Indonesia) (Algeria)	Mohammad Ahsan / Hendra Setiawan; Koceila Mammeri / Youcef Sabri Medel	21; 9	21; 15
5	(Indonesia) (Algeria)	Leo Rolly Carnando / Daniel Marthin; Mohamed Abderrahime Belarbi / Adel Hamek	21; 3	21; 11

=== Indonesia vs Thailand ===
Indonesia
3
Ceres Arena Court 1
11 October 2021, 13:30 UTC+2

Thailand
2

			1	2	3
1	(Indonesia) (Thailand)	Anthony Sinisuka Ginting; Kantaphon Wangcharoen	21; 16	22; 24	23; 25
2	(Indonesia) (Thailand)	Marcus Fernaldi Gideon / Kevin Sanjaya Sukamuljo; Supak Jomkoh / Kittinupong Kedren	19; 21	21; 18	21; 13
3	(Indonesia) (Thailand)	Jonatan Christie; Kunlavut Vitidsarn	10; 21	14; 21
4	(Indonesia) (Thailand)	Fajar Alfian / Muhammad Rian Ardianto; Natthapat Trinkajee / Tanupat Viriyangkura	21; 9	21; 12
5	(Indonesia) (Thailand)	Shesar Hiren Rhustavito; Adulrach Namkul	23; 21	10; 21	21; 8

=== Chinese Taipei vs Algeria ===
Chinese Taipei
5
Ceres Arena Court 3
11 October 2021, 13:30 UTC+2

Algeria
0

			1	2	3
1	(Chinese Taipei) (Algeria)	Wang Tzu-wei; Youcef Sabri Medel	21; 17	21; 7
2	(Chinese Taipei) (Algeria)	Chi Yu-jen; Mohamed Abderrahime Belarbi	21; 12	21; 17
3	(Chinese Taipei) (Algeria)	Liao Jhuo-fu; Adel Hamek	21; 12	21; 19
4	(Chinese Taipei) (Algeria)	Lee Yang / Wang Chi-lin; Koceila Mammeri / Youcef Sabri Medel	21; 7	21; 11
5	(Chinese Taipei) (Algeria)	Lu Ching-yao / Yang Po-han; Mohamed Abderrahime Belarbi / Adel Hamek	21; 13	21; 7

=== Indonesia vs Chinese Taipei ===
Indonesia
3
Ceres Arena Court 1
13 October 2021, 8:30 UTC+2

Chinese Taipei
2

			1	2	3
1	(Indonesia) (Chinese Taipei)	Anthony Sinisuka Ginting; Chou Tien-chen	22; 20	21; 16
2	(Indonesia) (Chinese Taipei)	Fajar Alfian / Muhammad Rian Ardianto; Lee Yang / Wang Chi-lin	26; 28	21; 16	14; 21
3	(Indonesia) (Chinese Taipei)	Jonatan Christie; Wang Tzu-wei	21; 17	21; 13
4	(Indonesia) (Chinese Taipei)	Mohammad Ahsan / Daniel Marthin; Lu Ching-yao / Yang Po-han	20; 22	21; 17	21; 23
5	(Indonesia) (Chinese Taipei)	Shesar Hiren Rhustavito; Chi Yu-jen	16; 21	21; 18	21; 19

=== Thailand vs Algeria ===
Thailand
5
Ceres Arena Court 3
13 October 2021, 13:30 UTC+2

Algeria
0

			1	2	3
1	(Thailand) (Algeria)	Kantaphon Wangcharoen; Youcef Sabri Medel	21; 5	21; 11
2	(Thailand) (Algeria)	Kunlavut Vitidsarn; Mohamed Abderrahime Belarbi	21; 7	21; 10
3	(Thailand) (Algeria)	Adulrach Namkul; Adel Hamek	21; 8	21; 8
4	(Thailand) (Algeria)	Supak Jomkoh / Kittinupong Kedren; Koceila Mammeri / Youcef Sabri Medel	21; 11	21; 10
5	(Thailand) (Algeria)	Dechapol Puavaranukroh / Natthapat Trinkajee; Mohamed Abderrahime Belarbi / Adel Hamek	21; 9	21; 8

== Group B ==
Pos	Team	Pld	W	L	GF	GA	GD	PF	PA	PD	Pts	Qualification
1	Denmark (H)	3	3	0	24	9	+15	688	514	+174	3	Advance to quarter-finals
2	Korea	3	2	1	19	13	+6	587	532	+55	2	Advance to quarter-finals
3	Germany	3	1	2	13	20	−7	551	658	−107	1	
4	France	3	0	3	11	25	−14	574	696	−122	0	

Source: Tournament Software
Rules for classification: Tiebreakers
(H) Host

=== Korea vs Germany ===
Korea
4
Ceres Arena Court 1
9 October 2021, 19:00 UTC+2

Germany
1

			1	2	3
1	(South Korea) (Germany)	Heo Kwang-hee; Max Weißkirchen	21; 15	21; 13
2	(South Korea) (Germany)	Choi Sol-gyu / Seo Seung-jae; Jones Ralfy Jansen / Marvin Seidel	21; 13	21; 17
3	(South Korea) (Germany)	Kim Dong-hun; Fabian Roth	17; 21	21; 18	23; 25
4	(South Korea) (Germany)	Kang Min-hyuk / Kim Won-ho; Daniel Hess / Jan Colin Völker	21; 8	21; 13
5	(South Korea) (Germany)	Jeon Hyeok-jin; Matthias Kicklitz	21; 18	21; 7

=== Denmark vs France ===
Denmark
5
Ceres Arena Court 2
9 October 2021, 19:00 UTC+2

France
0

			1	2	3
1	(Denmark) (France)	Viktor Axelsen; Christo Popov	21; 13	20; 22	21; 8
2	(Denmark) (France)	Anders Antonsen; Arnaud Merklé	21; 11	21; 7
3	(Denmark) (France)	Mads Pieler Kolding / Frederik Søgaard; Fabien Delrue / William Villeger	19; 21	21; 14	21; 15
4	(Denmark) (France)	Rasmus Gemke; Alex Lanier	21; 15	16; 21	22; 20
5	(Denmark) (France)	Kim Astrup / Anders Skaarup Rasmussen; Christo Popov / Toma Junior Popov	21; 15	22; 20

=== Korea vs France ===
Korea
4
Ceres Arena Court 1
11 October 2021, 19:00 UTC+2

France
1

			1	2	3
1	(South Korea) (France)	Heo Kwang-hee; Toma Junior Popov	21; 13	13; 21	21; 14
2	(South Korea) (France)	Kim Dong-hun; Arnaud Merklé	12; 21	11; 21
3	(South Korea) (France)	Kang Min-hyuk / Kim Won-ho; Fabien Delrue / William Villeger	21; 8	21; 8
4	(South Korea) (France)	Jeon Hyeok-jin; Alex Lanier	21; 12	21; 9
5	(South Korea) (France)	Choi Sol-gyu / Seo Seung-jae; Christo Popov / Toma Junior Popov	21; 16	21; 13

=== Denmark vs Germany ===
Denmark
3
Ceres Arena Court 2
11 October 2021, 19:00 UTC+2

Germany
2

			1	2	3
1	(Denmark) (Germany)	Viktor Axelsen; Samuel Hsiao	21; 9	21; 8
2	(Denmark) (Germany)	Kim Astrup / Anders Skaarup Rasmussen; Mark Lamsfuß / Marvin Seidel	20; 22	24; 26
3	(Denmark) (Germany)	Rasmus Gemke; Fabian Roth	19; 21	24; 26
4	(Denmark) (Germany)	Mathias Christiansen / Frederik Søgaard; Daniel Hess / Jan Colin Völker	21; 12	21; 11
5	(Denmark) (Germany)	Hans-Kristian Vittinghus; Matthias Kicklitz	21; 15	21; 8

=== Denmark vs Korea ===
Denmark
4
Ceres Arena Court 1
13 October 2021, 19:00 UTC+2

Korea
1

			1	2	3
1	(Denmark) (South Korea)	Viktor Axelsen; Heo Kwang-hee	21; 12	21; 14
2	(Denmark) (South Korea)	Kim Astrup / Anders Skaarup Rasmussen; Jin Yong / Seo Seung-jae	21; 19	21; 8
3	(Denmark) (South Korea)	Anders Antonsen; Jeon Hyeok-jin	21; 15	21; 14
4	(Denmark) (South Korea)	Mathias Christiansen / Frederik Søgaard; Kang Min-hyuk / Kim Won-ho	19; 21	20; 22
5	(Denmark) (South Korea)	Rasmus Gemke; Cho Geon-yeop	21; 9	22; 20

=== Germany vs France ===
Germany
3
Ceres Arena Court 2
13 October 2021, 19:00 UTC+2

France
2

			1	2	3
1	(Germany) (France)	Max Weißkirchen; Toma Junior Popov	21; 13	21; 15
2	(Germany) (France)	Samuel Hsiao; Christo Popov	12; 21	17; 21
3	(Germany) (France)	Fabian Roth; Arnaud Merklé	21; 17	19; 21	14; 21
4	(Germany) (France)	Marvin Seidel / Jan Colin Völker; Fabien Delrue / William Villeger	22; 20	15; 21	21; 15
5	(Germany) (France)	Jones Ralfy Jansen / Mark Lamsfuß; Christo Popov / Toma Junior Popov	21; 18	21; 13

== Group C ==
Pos	Team	Pld	W	L	GF	GA	GD	PF	PA	PD	Pts	Qualification
1	China	3	3	0	28	3	+25	638	360	+278	3	Advance to quarter-finals
2	India	3	2	1	23	8	+15	617	397	+220	2	Advance to quarter-finals
3	Netherlands	3	1	2	8	22	−14	429	516	−87	1	
4	Tahiti	3	0	3	2	28	−26	216	627	−411	0	

Source: Tournament Software
Rules for classification: Tiebreakers

=== India vs Netherlands ===
India
5
Ceres Arena Court 1
10 October 2021, 19:00 UTC+2

Netherlands
0

			1	2	3
1	(India) (Netherlands)	Srikanth Kidambi; Joran Kweekel	21; 12	21; 14
2	(India) (Netherlands)	Satwiksairaj Rankireddy / Chirag Shetty; Ruben Jille / Ties van der Lecq	21; 19	21; 12
3	(India) (Netherlands)	B. Sai Praneeth; Robin Mesman	21; 4	21; 12
4	(India) (Netherlands)	Arjun M.R. / Dhruv Kapila; Andy Buijk / Brian Wassink	21; 12	21; 13
5	(India) (Netherlands)	Sameer Verma; Gijs Duijs	21; 6	21; 11

=== China vs Tahiti ===
China
5
Ceres Arena Court 3
10 October 2021, 19:00 UTC+2

Tahiti
0

			1	2	3
1	(China) (French Polynesia)	Lu Guangzu; Louis Beaubois	21; 4	21; 5
2	(China) (French Polynesia)	Li Shifeng; Rémi Rossi	21; 4	21; 10
3	(China) (French Polynesia)	Weng Hongyang; Glen Lefoll	21; 4	21; 4
4	(China) (French Polynesia)	He Jiting / Tan Qiang; Elias Maublanc / Heiva Yvonet	21; 8	21; 2
5	(China) (French Polynesia)	Di Zijian / Wang Chang; Glen Lefoll / Rémi Rossi	21; 3	21; 12

=== China vs Netherlands ===
China
5
Ceres Arena Court 1
12 October 2021, 13:30 UTC+2

Netherlands
0

			1	2	3
1	(China) (Netherlands)	Lu Guangzu; Joran Kweekel	21; 15	21; 19
2	(China) (Netherlands)	He Jiting / Zhou Haodong; Ruben Jille / Ties van der Lecq	21; 11	21; 7
3	(China) (Netherlands)	Li Shifeng; Robin Mesman	21; 7	21; 8
4	(China) (Netherlands)	Liu Cheng / Wang Yilyu; Andy Buijk / Brian Wassink	21; 14	21; 10
5	(China) (Netherlands)	Weng Hongyang; Gijs Duijs	21; 10	21; 6

=== India vs Tahiti ===
India
5
Ceres Arena Court 3
12 October 2021, 19:00 UTC+2

Tahiti
0

			1	2	3
1	(India) (French Polynesia)	B. Sai Praneeth; Louis Beaubois	21; 5	21; 6
2	(India) (French Polynesia)	Sameer Verma; Rémi Rossi	21; 12	21; 12
3	(India) (French Polynesia)	Kiran George; Elias Maublanc	21; 4	21; 2
4	(India) (French Polynesia)	Krishna Prasad Garaga / Vishnu Vardhan; Glen Lefoll / Rémi Rossi	21; 8	21; 7
5	(India) (French Polynesia)	Satwiksairaj Rankireddy / Chirag Shetty; Elias Maublanc / Heiva Yvonet	21; 5	21; 3

=== Netherlands vs Tahiti ===
Netherlands
4
Ceres Arena Court 3
13 October 2021, 19:00 UTC+2

Tahiti
1

			1	2	3
1	(Netherlands) (French Polynesia)	Joran Kweekel; Louis Beaubois	21; 6	21; 9
2	(Netherlands) (French Polynesia)	Robin Mesman; Rémi Rossi	16; 21	23; 25
3	(Netherlands) (French Polynesia)	Gijs Duijs; Heiva Yvonet	21; 3	21; 4
4	(Netherlands) (French Polynesia)	Andy Buijk / Brian Wassink; Glen Lefoll / Rémi Rossi	21; 10	21; 10
5	(Netherlands) (French Polynesia)	Ruben Jille / Ties van der Lecq; Elias Maublanc / Heiva Yvonet	21; 4	21; 4

=== China vs India ===
China
4
Ceres Arena Court 1
14 October 2021, 8:30 UTC+2

India
1

			1	2	3
1	(China) (India)	Shi Yuqi; Srikanth Kidambi	21; 12	21; 16
2	(China) (India)	He Jiting / Zhou Haodong; Satwiksairaj Rankireddy / Chirag Shetty	14; 21	14; 21
3	(China) (India)	Lu Guangzu; Sameer Verma	14; 21	21; 9	24; 22
4	(China) (India)	Liu Cheng / Wang Yilyu; Arjun M.R. / Dhruv Kapila	26; 24	21; 19
5	(China) (India)	Li Shifeng; Kiran George	21; 15	21; 17

== Group D ==
Pos	Team	Pld	W	L	GF	GA	GD	PF	PA	PD	Pts	Qualification
1	Japan	2	2	0	17	5	+12	443	310	+133	2	Advance to quarter-finals
2	Malaysia	2	1	1	13	8	+5	391	352	+39	1	Advance to quarter-finals
3	Canada	2	0	2	2	19	−17	258	430	−172	0	
4	England	0	0	0	0	0	0	0	0	0	0	Withdrew (Note: England withdrew from the tournament a few days before the competition began, after three of their four selected single players got injured. They were unable to field a competitive team due to those injuries on the top-ranked players.)

Source: Tournament Software
Rules for classification: Tiebreakers

=== Japan vs Canada ===
Japan
4
Ceres Arena Court 3
10 October 2021, 13:30 UTC+2

Canada
1

			1	2	3
1	(Japan) (Canada)	Kanta Tsuneyama; Brian Yang	18; 21	21; 19	13; 21
2	(Japan) (Canada)	Kenta Nishimoto; Jason Ho-Shue	21; 14	21; 6
3	(Japan) (Canada)	Takuro Hoki / Taichi Saito; Phillipe Charron / Maxima Tétreault	21; 9	21; 2
4	(Japan) (Canada)	Kodai Naraoka; B. R. Sankeerth	21; 8	21; 14
5	(Japan) (Canada)	Akira Koga / Yuta Watanabe; Jason Ho-shue / Nyl Yakura	21; 3	21; 12

=== Malaysia vs Canada ===
Malaysia
5
Ceres Arena Court 2
12 October 2021, 19:00 UTC+2

Canada
0

			1	2	3
1	(Malaysia) (Canada)	Lee Zii Jia; Brian Yang	21; 18	21; 13
2	(Malaysia) (Canada)	Cheam June Wei; Jason Ho-Shue	21; 14	21; 14
3	(Malaysia) (Canada)	Ng Tze Yong; B. R. Sankeerth	21; 7	21; 19
4	(Malaysia) (Canada)	Nur Izzuddin / Soh Wooi Yik; Phillipe Charron / Maxime Tétreault	21; 7	21; 10
5	(Malaysia) (Canada)	Aaron Chia / Goh Sze Fei; B. R. Sankeerth / Nyl Yakura	21; 14	21; 13

=== Japan vs Malaysia ===
Japan
4
Ceres Arena Court 2
14 October 2021, 8:30 UTC+2

Malaysia
1

			1	2	3
1	(Japan) (Malaysia)	Kento Momota; Lee Zii Jia	15; 21	21; 12	23; 21
2	(Japan) (Malaysia)	Takuro Hoki / Yugo Kobayashi; Aaron Chia / Soh Wooi Yik	21; 13	21; 13
3	(Japan) (Malaysia)	Kanta Tsuneyama; Cheam June Wei	22; 20	21; 13
4	(Japan) (Malaysia)	Akira Koga / Yuta Watanabe; Goh Sze Fei / Nur Izzuddin	21; 10	21; 16
5	(Japan) (Malaysia)	Kenta Nishimoto; Leong Jun Hao	19; 21	18; 21
