= Aarhus Sports Park =

Sports venue in Aarhus, Denmark

Coordinates: 56.1313°N 10.1949°E

Aarhus Sports Park (Danish: Aarhus Idrætspark) is a sports complex located in Aarhus, Denmark. The complex is named "Ceres Park & Arena" for sponsorship reasons, and contains various sports venues including the Aarhus Stadion and Ceres Arena. The complex is home to multiple sports teams from Aarhus, including Aarhus Gymnastikforening (AGF), Aarhus 1900, Aarhus Håndbold, Team Århus Floorball among others.

== Sports venues ==
- Aarhus Stadium, home ground for Aarhus Gymnastikforening (AGF), currently known as Ceres Park
- Ceres Arena, home to the handball team Aarhus Håndbold, floorball team Team Århus Floorball
- Aarhus Cyklebane (velodrome)
- Jutland Racecourse
- Aarhus 1900 Tennis
