= 2020 Thomas & Uber Cup =

Biennial international badminton championship

2020 Thomas & Uber Cup 2020 Thomas og Uber Cup

Tournament details
- Dates: 9–17 October 2021
- Edition: 31st (Thomas Cup); 28th (Uber Cup)
- Level: International
- Nations: 16 (Thomas Cup); 16 (Uber Cup)
- Venue: Ceres Arena
- Location: Aarhus, Denmark
- Official website: bwfthomasubercups.com

The 2020 Thomas & Uber Cup (officially known as the TotalEnergies BWF Thomas & Uber Cup Finals 2020 for sponsorship reasons) was the 31st edition of the Thomas Cup and the 28th edition of the Uber Cup, the biennial international badminton championship contested by the men and women's national teams of the member associations of Badminton World Federation (BWF). The tournament were played at Ceres Arena in Aarhus, Denmark. It is the first time that Denmark hosted the Thomas Cup and Uber Cup tournament and the first time this event was held in Europe since England 1982. It was due to be played on 15–23 August 2020, but on 29 April 2020 it was postponed to the 3–11 October due to the COVID-19 pandemic. On 15 September 2020 it was again postponed and on 21 December 2020 it was announced that it was postponed to 9–17 October 2021.

China was the defending men's champion team, and Japan was the defending women's champion team. Both were defeated in the final, by Indonesia and China respectively. Both Indonesia and China extended their record of 14 and 15 titles respectively.

Due to non-compliance with the new Anti-Doping rules by World Anti-Doping Agency (WADA), Indonesia (as Thomas Cup champions) and Thailand (as Uber Cup bronze medal) were not permitted to display their national flag at the Victory Ceremony. Instead, they replaced it with PBSI and BAT flag, respectively.

== Host selection ==
Aarhus was named as the host in November 2018 during BWF Council meeting in Kuala Lumpur, Malaysia, where BWF also decided the host for 18 major events, including Thomas and Uber Cup, Sudirman Cup, BWF World Championships, BWF World Junior Championships, and BWF World Senior Championships in 2019 through 2025.

== Qualification ==
=== Thomas Cup ===
Means of qualification	Date	Venue	Slot	Qualified teams
Host country	29 November 2018	Kuala Lumpur	1	Denmark
2018 Thomas Cup	20–27 May 2018	Bangkok	1	China
2020 All Africa Team Championships	10–13 February 2020	Cairo	1	Algeria
2020 Asia Team Championships	11–16 February 2020	Manila	4	India
2020 Asia Team Championships	11–16 February 2020	Manila	4	Indonesia
2020 Asia Team Championships	11–16 February 2020	Manila	4	Japan
2020 Asia Team Championships	11–16 February 2020	Manila	4	Malaysia
2020 European Team Championships	11–16 February 2020	Liévin	3-1	France
2020 European Team Championships	11–16 February 2020	Liévin	3-1	Netherlands
2020 European Team Championships	11–16 February 2020	Liévin	3-1	~~Russia~~^{B}
2020 Oceania Championships	13–15 February 2020	Ballarat	1	~~Australia~~^{C}
2020 Oceania Championships	13–15 February 2020	Ballarat	1	Tahiti
2020 Pan Am Championships	13–16 February 2020	Salvador	1	Canada
World Team Rankings	18 February 2020	Kuala Lumpur	3	Chinese Taipei
World Team Rankings	18 February 2020	Kuala Lumpur	3	South Korea
World Team Rankings	18 February 2020	Kuala Lumpur	3	Thailand
World Team Rankings for Europe	18 February 2020	Kuala Lumpur	1+1	England^{A}
World Team Rankings for Europe	18 February 2020	Kuala Lumpur	1+1	Germany^{B}
Total			16	

Note

- ^A Denmark qualified both as host and continental semi-finalists, therefore that quota was added to the world team rankings for Europe.
- ^B Russia withdrew and were replaced by Germany as the next highest ranked team from Europe.
- ^C Australia withdrew and were replaced by Tahiti as the next highest-ranked team from Oceania because New Zealand declined the offer.

=== Uber Cup ===
Means of qualification	Date	Venue	Slot	Qualified teams
Host country	29 November 2018	Kuala Lumpur	1	Denmark
2018 Uber Cup	20–27 May 2018	Bangkok	1	Japan
2020 All Africa Team Championships	10–13 February 2020	Cairo	1	Egypt
2020 Asia Team Championships	11–16 February 2020	Manila	3	Malaysia
2020 Asia Team Championships	11–16 February 2020	Manila	3	South Korea
2020 Asia Team Championships	11–16 February 2020	Manila	3	Thailand
2020 European Team Championships	11–16 February 2020	Liévin	3	France
2020 European Team Championships	11–16 February 2020	Liévin	3	Germany
2020 European Team Championships	11–16 February 2020	Liévin	3	Scotland
2020 Oceania Championships	13–15 February 2020	Ballarat	1	~~Australia~~^{4}
2020 Oceania Championships	13–15 February 2020	Ballarat	1	Tahiti
2020 Pan Am Championships	13–16 February 2020	Salvador	1	Canada
World Team Rankings	18 February 2020	Kuala Lumpur	3	Indonesia
World Team Rankings	18 February 2020	Kuala Lumpur	3	Chinese Taipei
World Team Rankings	18 February 2020	Kuala Lumpur	3	India
World Team Rankings for Asia	18 February 2020	Kuala Lumpur	1	China ^{1}
World Team Rankings for Europe	18 February 2020	Kuala Lumpur	1	~~Russia~~^{2} ^{3}
World Team Rankings for Europe	18 February 2020	Kuala Lumpur	1	Spain ^{3}
Total			16	

Note

- ^1 Japan qualified both as defending champions and continental semi-finalists, therefore that quota was added to the best world team rankings for Asia.
- ^2 Denmark qualified both as host and continental semi-finalists, therefore that quota was added to the best world team rankings for Europe.
- ^3 Russia withdrew and were replaced by Spain as the next highest ranked team from Europe because Turkey declined the offer.
- ^4 Australia withdrew and were replaced by Tahiti as the next highest ranked team from Oceania because New Zealand declined the offer.

== Draw ==
The original draw for the tournament was conducted on 3 August 2020, at 15:00 MST, at BWF Headquarters in Kuala Lumpur. BWF then decided to redraw the tournament after the postponement from 2020 to 2021 this time to be conducted on 18 August 2021, at 15:00 MST also at the BWF headquarters in Kuala Lumpur. The 16 men and 16 women teams will be drawn into four groups of four.

For the Thomas Cup draw, the teams were allocated to three pots based on the World Team Rankings of 18 February 2021. Pot 1 contained the top seed Indonesia (which were assigned to position A1), the second seed Japan (which were assigned to position D1) and the next two best teams, China and Denmark. Pot 2 contained the next best four teams, and Pot 3 was for the ninth to sixteenth seeds.

A similar procedure will be applied for the Uber Cup draw, where top seed Japan (which were assigned to position A1), the second seed China (which were assigned to position D1), South Korea and Thailand were in Pot 1.

Thomas Cup

Pot 1	Pot 2	Pot 3
Indonesia; Japan; China; Denmark	Chinese Taipei; India; Malaysia; South Korea	Thailand; England; Germany; Canada France; Netherlands; Tahiti; Algeria

Uber Cup

Pot 1	Pot 2	Pot 3
Japan; China; South Korea; Thailand	Indonesia; Chinese Taipei; India; Denmark	Malaysia; Canada; France; Germany Spain; Tahiti; Egypt; Scotland

== Tiebreakers ==
The rankings of teams in each group were determined per BWF Statutes Section 5.1, Article 16.3:

1. Number of matches won;
2. Match result between the teams in question;
3. Match difference in all group matches;
4. Game difference in all group matches;
5. Point difference in all group matches.

== Medal summary ==
=== Medalists ===
Event	Gold	Silver	Bronze
Thomas Cup	Indonesia; Anthony Sinisuka Ginting; Jonatan Christie; Shesar Hiren Rhustavito; Chico Aura Dwi Wardoyo; Marcus Fernaldi Gideon; Kevin Sanjaya Sukamuljo; Mohammad Ahsan; Hendra Setiawan; Fajar Alfian; Muhammad Rian Ardianto; Leo Rolly Carnando; Daniel Marthin	China; Shi Yuqi; Lu Guangzu; Li Shifeng; Weng Hongyang; Gu Junfeng; Tan Qiang; He Jiting; Liu Cheng; Wang Chang; Di Zijian; Wang Yilyu; Zhou Haodong	Denmark; Viktor Axelsen; Anders Antonsen; Rasmus Gemke; Hans-Kristian Vittinghus; Victor Svendsen; Kim Astrup; Anders Skaarup Rasmussen; Mathias Christiansen; Lasse Mølhede; Jeppe Bay; Mads Pieler Kolding; Frederik Søgaard
Thomas Cup	Indonesia; Anthony Sinisuka Ginting; Jonatan Christie; Shesar Hiren Rhustavito; Chico Aura Dwi Wardoyo; Marcus Fernaldi Gideon; Kevin Sanjaya Sukamuljo; Mohammad Ahsan; Hendra Setiawan; Fajar Alfian; Muhammad Rian Ardianto; Leo Rolly Carnando; Daniel Marthin	China; Shi Yuqi; Lu Guangzu; Li Shifeng; Weng Hongyang; Gu Junfeng; Tan Qiang; He Jiting; Liu Cheng; Wang Chang; Di Zijian; Wang Yilyu; Zhou Haodong	Japan; Kento Momota; Kanta Tsuneyama; Kenta Nishimoto; Koki Watanabe; Kodai Naraoka; Yuta Watanabe; Takuro Hoki; Yugo Kobayashi; Akira Koga; Taichi Saito; Yuki Kaneko
Uber Cup	China; Chen Yufei; He Bingjiao; Wang Zhiyi; Han Yue; Han Qianxi; Chen Qingchen; Jia Yifan; Zheng Yu; Li Wenmei; Liu Xuanxuan; Xia Yuting; Huang Dongping	Japan; Nozomi Okuhara; Akane Yamaguchi; Sayaka Takahashi; Aya Ohori; Asuka Takahashi; Yuki Fukushima; Mayu Matsumoto; Chiharu Shida; Nami Matsuyama; Misaki Matsutomo; Arisa Higashino	South Korea; An Se-young; Kim Ga-eun; Sim Yu-jin; Jeon Ju-i; Shin Seung-chan; Lee So-hee; Kim So-yeong; Kong Hee-yong; Chae Yoo-jung
Uber Cup	China; Chen Yufei; He Bingjiao; Wang Zhiyi; Han Yue; Han Qianxi; Chen Qingchen; Jia Yifan; Zheng Yu; Li Wenmei; Liu Xuanxuan; Xia Yuting; Huang Dongping	Japan; Nozomi Okuhara; Akane Yamaguchi; Sayaka Takahashi; Aya Ohori; Asuka Takahashi; Yuki Fukushima; Mayu Matsumoto; Chiharu Shida; Nami Matsuyama; Misaki Matsutomo; Arisa Higashino	Thailand; Ratchanok Intanon; Pornpawee Chochuwong; Busanan Ongbamrungphan; Phittayaporn Chaiwan; Supanida Katethong; Jongkolphan Kititharakul; Rawinda Prajongjai; Puttita Supajirakul; Sapsiree Taerattanachai; Benyapa Aimsaard; Nuntakarn Aimsaard

=== Medal table ===
* Host nation (Denmark)

Rank	Nation	Gold	Silver	Bronze	Total
1	China	1	1	0	2
2	Indonesia	1	0	0	1
3	Japan	0	1	1	2
4	Denmark*	0	0	1	1
4	South Korea	0	0	1	1
4	Thailand	0	0	1	1
Totals (6 entries)		2	2	4	8

== Thomas Cup ==
=== Group stage ===
==== Group A ====
Pos	Team	Pld	W	L	GF	GA	GD	PF	PA	PD	Pts	Qualification
1	Indonesia	3	3	0	25	11	+14	723	570	+153	3	Advance to quarter-finals
2	Thailand	3	2	1	22	12	+10	649	549	+100	2	Advance to quarter-finals
3	Chinese Taipei	3	1	2	20	14	+6	676	597	+79	1	
4	Algeria	3	0	3	0	30	−30	298	630	−332	0	

Source: Tournament Software
Rules for classification: Tiebreakers

9 October 2021
8:30 UTC+2

Chinese Taipei	2–3	Thailand
Report

Ceres Arena Court 1, Aarhus

9 October 2021
19:00 UTC+2

Indonesia	5–0	Algeria
Report

Ceres Arena Court 3, Aarhus

11 October 2021
13:30 UTC+2

Indonesia	3–2	Thailand
Report

Ceres Arena Court 1, Aarhus

11 October 2021
13:30 UTC+2

Chinese Taipei	5–0	Algeria
Report

Ceres Arena Court 3, Aarhus

13 October 2021
8:30 UTC+2

Indonesia	3–2	Chinese Taipei
Report

Ceres Arena Court 1, Aarhus

13 October 2021
13:30 UTC+2

Thailand	5–0	Algeria
Report

Ceres Arena Court 3, Aarhus

==== Group B ====
Pos	Team	Pld	W	L	GF	GA	GD	PF	PA	PD	Pts	Qualification
1	Denmark (H)	3	3	0	24	9	+15	688	514	+174	3	Advance to quarter-finals
2	Korea	3	2	1	19	13	+6	587	532	+55	2	Advance to quarter-finals
3	Germany	3	1	2	13	20	−7	551	658	−107	1	
4	France	3	0	3	11	25	−14	574	696	−122	0	

Source: Tournament Software
Rules for classification: Tiebreakers
(H) Host

9 October 2021
19:00 UTC+2

Korea	4–1	Germany
Report

Ceres Arena Court 1, Aarhus

9 October 2021
19:00 UTC+2

Denmark	5–0	France
Report

Ceres Arena Court 2, Aarhus

11 October 2021
19:00 UTC+2

Korea	4–1	France
Report

Ceres Arena Court 1, Aarhus

11 October 2021
19:00 UTC+2

Denmark	3–2	Germany
Report

Ceres Arena Court 2, Aarhus

13 October 2021
19:00 UTC+2

Denmark	4–1	Korea
Report

Ceres Arena Court 1, Aarhus

13 October 2021
19:00 UTC+2

Germany	3–2	France
Report

Ceres Arena Court 2, Aarhus

==== Group C ====
Pos	Team	Pld	W	L	GF	GA	GD	PF	PA	PD	Pts	Qualification
1	China	3	3	0	28	3	+25	638	360	+278	3	Advance to quarter-finals
2	India	3	2	1	23	8	+15	617	397	+220	2	Advance to quarter-finals
3	Netherlands	3	1	2	8	22	−14	429	516	−87	1	
4	Tahiti	3	0	3	2	28	−26	216	627	−411	0	

Source: Tournament Software
Rules for classification: Tiebreakers

10 October 2021
19:00 UTC+2

India	5–0	Netherlands
Report

Ceres Arena Court 1, Aarhus

10 October 2021
19:00 UTC+2

China	5–0	Tahiti
Report

Ceres Arena Court 3, Aarhus

12 October 2021
13:30 UTC+2

China	5–0	Netherlands
Report

Ceres Arena Court 1, Aarhus

12 October 2021
19:00 UTC+2

India	5–0	Tahiti
Report

Ceres Arena Court 3, Aarhus

13 October 2021
19:00 UTC+2

Netherlands	4–1	Tahiti
Report

Ceres Arena Court 3, Aarhus

14 October 2021
8:30 UTC+2

China	4–1	India
Report

Ceres Arena Court 1, Aarhus

==== Group D ====
Pos	Team	Pld	W	L	GF	GA	GD	PF	PA	PD	Pts	Qualification
1	Japan	2	2	0	17	5	+12	443	310	+133	2	Advance to quarter-finals
2	Malaysia	2	1	1	13	8	+5	391	352	+39	1	Advance to quarter-finals
3	Canada	2	0	2	2	19	−17	258	430	−172	0	
4	England	0	0	0	0	0	0	0	0	0	0	Withdrew (Note: England withdrew from the tournament a few days before the competition began, after three of their four selected single players got injured. They were unable to field a competitive team due to those injuries on the top-ranked players.)

Source: Tournament Software
Rules for classification: Tiebreakers
Notes:

10 October 2021
13:30 UTC+2

Japan	4–1	Canada
Report

Ceres Arena Court 3, Aarhus

10 October 2021
19:00 UTC+2

Malaysia	Cancelled	England
Report

Ceres Arena Court 2, Aarhus

12 October 2021
8:30 UTC+2

Japan	Cancelled	England
Report

Ceres Arena Court 2, Aarhus

12 October 2021
19:00 UTC+2

Malaysia	5–0	Canada
Report

Ceres Arena Court 2, Aarhus

14 October 2021
8:30 UTC+2

Japan	4–1	Malaysia
Report

Ceres Arena Court 2, Aarhus

14 October 2021
8:30 UTC+2

England	Cancelled	Canada
Report

Ceres Arena Court 3, Aarhus

=== Knockout stage ===
==== Bracket ====
The draw was conducted on 14 October 2021 after the last match of the group stage.

Quarter-finals
Indonesia	3
Malaysia	0
Denmark	3
India	1
Thailand	0
China	3
Korea	2
Japan	3

Semi-finals
Indonesia	3
Denmark	1
China	3
Japan	1

Final
Indonesia	3
China	0

==== Quarter-finals ====
15 October 2021
13:30 UTC+2

Indonesia	3–0	Malaysia
Report

Ceres Arena Court 2, Aarhus

15 October 2021
13:30 UTC+2

Denmark	3–1	India
Report

Ceres Arena Court 1, Aarhus

15 October 2021
8:30 UTC+2

Thailand	0–3	China
Report

Ceres Arena Court 2, Aarhus

15 October 2021
8:30 UTC+2

Korea	2–3	Japan
Report

Ceres Arena Court 1, Aarhus

==== Semi-finals ====
16 October 2021
13:00 UTC+2

Indonesia	3–1	Denmark
Report

Ceres Arena Court 1, Aarhus

16 October 2021
13:00 UTC+2

China	3–1	Japan
Report

Ceres Arena Court 2, Aarhus

==== Final ====
17 October 2021
13:00 UTC+2

Indonesia	3–0	China
Report

Ceres Arena Court 1, Aarhus

2020 Thomas Cup champions

Indonesia (Note: The flag of Indonesia was not officially allowed to be used due to non-compliance to WADA regulations. A white flag with the Badminton Association of Indonesia (PBSI) emblem was instead used for the victory ceremony.)
Fourteenth title

=== Final ranking ===
Pos	Team	Pld	W	L	Pts	MD	GD	PD	Final result
1st place, gold medalist(s)	Indonesia	6	6	0	6	+15	+24	+199	Champions
2nd place, silver medalist(s)	China	6	5	1	5	+15	+29	+290	Runners-up
3rd place, bronze medalist(s)	Denmark	5	4	1	4	+9	+18	+222	Eliminated in semi-finals
3rd place, bronze medalist(s)	Japan	4	3	1	3	+5	+11	+158	Eliminated in semi-finals
5	India	4	2	2	2	+5	+10	+172	Eliminated in quarter-finals
6	Thailand	4	2	2	2	+2	+5	+57	Eliminated in quarter-finals
7	Korea	4	2	2	2	+2	+4	+30	Eliminated in quarter-finals
8	Malaysia	3	1	2	1	−1	+1	+24	Eliminated in quarter-finals
9	Chinese Taipei	3	1	2	1	+3	+6	+79	Eliminated in group stage
10	Germany	3	1	2	1	−3	−7	−107	Eliminated in group stage
11	Netherlands	3	1	2	1	−7	−14	−87	Eliminated in group stage
12	Canada	2	0	2	0	−8	−17	−172	Eliminated in group stage
13	France	3	0	3	0	−9	−14	−122	Eliminated in group stage
14	Tahiti	3	0	3	0	−13	−26	−411	Eliminated in group stage
15	Algeria	3	0	3	0	−15	−30	−332	Eliminated in group stage
16	England	—N/a							Withdrew

== Uber Cup ==
=== Group stage ===
==== Group A ====
Pos	Team	Pld	W	L	GF	GA	GD	PF	PA	PD	Pts	Qualification
1	Japan	3	3	0	30	0	+30	631	341	+290	3	Advance to quarter-finals
2	Indonesia	3	2	1	18	14	+4	571	541	+30	2	Advance to quarter-finals
3	France	3	1	2	8	24	−16	458	613	−155	1	
4	Germany	3	0	3	7	25	−18	471	636	−165	0	

Source: Tournament Software
Rules for classification: Tiebreakers

9 October 2021
8:30 UTC+2

Indonesia	4–1	Germany
Report

Ceres Arena Court 3, Aarhus

9 October 2021
13:30 UTC+2

Japan	5–0	France
Report

Ceres Arena Court 1, Aarhus

11 October 2021
8:30 UTC+2

Indonesia	4–1	France
Report

Ceres Arena Court 1, Aarhus

11 October 2021
13:30 UTC+2

Japan	5–0	Germany
Report

Ceres Arena Court 2, Aarhus

12 October 2021
13:30 UTC+2

Japan	5–0	Indonesia
Report

Ceres Arena Court 2, Aarhus

12 October 2021
13:30 UTC+2

Germany	2–3	France
Report

Ceres Arena Court 3, Aarhus

==== Group B ====
Pos	Team	Pld	W	L	GF	GA	GD	PF	PA	PD	Pts	Qualification
1	Thailand	3	3	0	30	1	+29	648	374	+274	3	Advance to quarter-finals
2	India	3	2	1	16	17	−1	584	546	+38	2	Advance to quarter-finals
3	Spain	3	1	2	10	22	−12	457	606	−149	1	
4	Scotland	3	0	3	8	24	−16	445	608	−163	0	

Source: Tournament Software
Rules for classification: Tiebreakers

10 October 2021
8:30 UTC+2

India	3–2	Spain
Report

Ceres Arena Court 1, Aarhus

10 October 2021
8:30 UTC+2

Thailand	5–0	Scotland
Report

Ceres Arena Court 2, Aarhus

12 October 2021
8:30 UTC+2

Thailand	5–0	Spain
Report

Ceres Arena Court 1, Aarhus

12 October 2021
8:30 UTC+2

India	4–1	Scotland
Report

Ceres Arena Court 3, Aarhus

13 October 2021
8:30 UTC+2

Thailand	5–0	India
Report

Ceres Arena Court 2, Aarhus

13 October 2021
13:30 UTC+2

Spain	3–2	Scotland
Report

Ceres Arena Court 2, Aarhus

==== Group C ====
Pos	Team	Pld	W	L	GF	GA	GD	PF	PA	PD	Pts	Qualification
1	Korea	3	3	0	29	2	+27	649	247	+402	3	Advance to quarter-finals
2	Chinese Taipei	3	2	1	22	9	+13	570	370	+200	2	Advance to quarter-finals
3	Egypt	3	1	2	10	21	−11	379	560	−181	1	
4	Tahiti	3	0	3	1	30	−29	233	654	−421	0	

Source: Tournament Software
Rules for classification: Tiebreakers

9 October 2021
13:30 UTC+2

Korea	5–0	Tahiti
Report

Ceres Arena Court 3, Aarhus

10 October 2021
8:30 UTC+2

Chinese Taipei	5–0	Egypt
Report

Ceres Arena Court 3, Aarhus

11 October 2021
8:30 UTC+2

Chinese Taipei	5–0	Tahiti
Report

Ceres Arena Court 2, Aarhus

11 October 2021
8:30 UTC+2

Korea	5–0	Egypt
Report

Ceres Arena Court 3, Aarhus

13 October 2021
8:30 UTC+2

Egypt	5–0	Tahiti
Report

Ceres Arena Court 3, Aarhus

13 October 2021
13:30 UTC+2

Korea	4–1	Chinese Taipei
Report

Ceres Arena Court 1, Aarhus

==== Group D ====
Pos	Team	Pld	W	L	GF	GA	GD	PF	PA	PD	Pts	Qualification
1	China	3	3	0	30	2	+28	663	395	+268	3	Advance to quarter-finals
2	Denmark (H)	3	2	1	20	15	+5	647	596	+51	2	Advance to quarter-finals
3	Canada	3	1	2	10	23	−13	477	621	−144	1	
4	Malaysia	3	0	3	7	27	−20	490	665	−175	0	

Source: Tournament Software
Rules for classification: Tiebreakers
(H) Host

9 October 2021
8:30 UTC+2

China	5–0	Canada
Report

Ceres Arena Court 2, Aarhus

9 October 2021
13:30 UTC+2

Denmark	4–1	Malaysia
Report

Ceres Arena Court 2, Aarhus

10 October 2021
13:30 UTC+2

China	5–0	Malaysia
Report

Ceres Arena Court 2, Aarhus

10 October 2021
19:00 UTC+2

Denmark	4–1	Canada
Report

Ceres Arena Court 1, Aarhus

11 October 2021
19:00 UTC+2

Malaysia	1–4	Canada
Report

Ceres Arena Court 3, Aarhus

12 October 2021
19:00 UTC+2

China	5–0	Denmark
Report

Ceres Arena Court 1, Aarhus

=== Knockout stage ===
==== Bracket ====
The draw was conducted on 13 October 2021, after the last match of the group stage.

Quarter-finals
Japan	3
India	0
Korea	3
Denmark	0
Indonesia	2
Thailand	3
Chinese Taipei	0
China	3

Semi-finals
Japan	3
Korea	1
Thailand	0
China	3

Final
Japan	1
China	3

==== Quarter-finals ====
14 October 2021
13:30 UTC+2

Japan	3–0	India
Report

Ceres Arena Court 2, Aarhus

14 October 2021
13:30 UTC+2

Korea	3–0	Denmark
Report

Ceres Arena Court 1, Aarhus

14 October 2021
19:00 UTC+2

Indonesia	2–3	Thailand
Report

Ceres Arena Court 2, Aarhus

14 October 2021
19:00 UTC+2

Chinese Taipei	0–3	China
Report

Ceres Arena Court 1, Aarhus

==== Semi-finals ====
15 October 2021
19:00 UTC+2

Japan	3–1	Korea
Report

Ceres Arena Court 1, Aarhus

15 October 2021
19:00 UTC+2

Thailand	0–3	China
Report

Ceres Arena Court 2, Aarhus

==== Final ====
16 October 2021
19:00 UTC+2

Japan	1–3	China
Report

Ceres Arena Court 1, Aarhus

2020 Uber Cup champions

China
Fifteenth title

=== Final ranking ===
Pos	Team	Pld	W	L	Pts	MD	GD	PD	Final result
1st place, gold medalist(s)	China	6	6	0	6	+23	+42	+387	Champions
2nd place, silver medalist(s)	Japan	6	5	1	5	+18	+35	+345	Runners-up
3rd place, bronze medalist(s)	Korea	5	4	1	4	+14	+30	+439	Eliminated in semi-finals
3rd place, bronze medalist(s)	Thailand	5	4	1	4	+13	+26	+246	Eliminated in semi-finals
5	Chinese Taipei	4	2	2	2	+4	+8	+153	Eliminated in quarter-finals
6	Indonesia	4	2	2	2	0	+1	–10	Eliminated in quarter-finals
7	Denmark	4	2	2	2	−2	0	+11	Eliminated in quarter-finals
8	India	4	2	2	2	−4	−7	−18	Eliminated in quarter-finals
9	Egypt	3	1	2	1	−5	−11	−181	Eliminated in group stage
10	Spain	3	1	2	1	−5	−12	−149	Eliminated in group stage
11	Canada	3	1	2	1	−5	−13	−144	Eliminated in group stage
12	France	3	1	2	1	−7	−16	−155	Eliminated in group stage
13	Scotland	3	0	3	0	−9	−16	−163	Eliminated in group stage
14	Germany	3	0	3	0	−9	−18	−165	Eliminated in group stage
15	Malaysia	3	0	3	0	−11	−20	−175	Eliminated in group stage
16	Tahiti	3	0	3	0	−15	−29	−421	Eliminated in group stage
