= 2020 Uber Cup knockout stage =

The knockout stage for the 2020 Uber Cup in Aarhus, Denmark, began on 14 October 2021 with the quarter-finals and ended on 16 October with the final tie.

== Qualified teams ==
The top two placed teams from each of the eight groups qualified for this stage.

Group	Winners	Runners-up
A	Japan	Indonesia
B	Thailand	India
C	Korea	Chinese Taipei
D	China	Denmark

== Bracket ==
The draw was conducted on 13 October 2021, after the last match of the group stage.

Quarter-finals
Japan	3
India	0
Korea	3
Denmark	0
Indonesia	2
Thailand	3
Chinese Taipei	0
China	3

Semi-finals
Japan	3
Korea	1
Thailand	0
China	3

Final
Japan	1
China	3

== Quarter-finals ==
=== Quarter-final 1 ===
Japan
3
Ceres Arena Court 2
14 October 2021 13:30 UTC+2

India
0

			1	2	3
1	(Japan) (India)	Akane Yamaguchi; Malvika Bansod	21; 12	21; 17
2	(Japan) (India)	Yuki Fukushima / Mayu Matsumoto; Tanisha Crasto / Rutaparna Panda	21; 8	21; 10
3	(Japan) (India)	Sayaka Takahashi; Aditi Bhatt	21; 16	21; 7
4	(Japan) (India)	Misaki Matsutomo / Nami Matsuyama; Treesa Jolly / Gayathri Gopichand				not played
5	(Japan) (India)	Asuka Takahashi; Tasnim Mir				not played

=== Quarter-final 2 ===
Korea
3
Ceres Arena Court 1
14 October 2021 13:30 UTC+2

Denmark
0

			1	2	3
1	(South Korea) (Denmark)	An Se-young; Mia Blichfeldt	14; 21	21; 8	21; 8
2	(South Korea) (Denmark)	Lee So-hee / Shin Seung-chan; Maiken Fruergaard / Sara Thygesen	21; 17	21; 18
3	(South Korea) (Denmark)	Kim Ga-eun; Line Christophersen	21; 11	21; 17
4	(South Korea) (Denmark)	Kim So-yeong / Kong Hee-yong; Alexandra Bøje / Mette Poulsen				not played
5	(South Korea) (Denmark)	Sim Yu-jin; Line Kjærsfeldt				not played

=== Quarter-final 3 ===
Indonesia
2
Ceres Arena Court 2
14 October 2021 19:00 UTC+2

Thailand
3

			1	2	3
1	(Indonesia) (Thailand)	Gregoria Mariska Tunjung; Pornpawee Chochuwong	21; 14	10; 21	10; 21
2	(Indonesia) (Thailand)	Greysia Polii / Apriyani Rahayu; Jongkolphan Kititharakul / Rawinda Prajongjai	21; 17	17; 21	21; 19
3	(Indonesia) (Thailand)	Putri Kusuma Wardani; Busanan Ongbamrungphan	9; 21	21; 23
4	(Indonesia) (Thailand)	Siti Fadia Silva Ramadhanti / Ribka Sugiarto; Puttita Supajirakul / Sapsiree Taerattanachai	21; 19	15; 21	21; 15
5	(Indonesia) (Thailand)	Ester Nurumi Tri Wardoyo; Phittayaporn Chaiwan	23; 25	8; 21

=== Quarter-final 4 ===
Chinese Taipei
0
Ceres Arena Court 1
14 October 2021 19:00 UTC+2

China
3

			1	2	3
1	(Chinese Taipei) (China)	Pai Yu-po; Chen Yufei	16; 21	13; 21
2	(Chinese Taipei) (China)	Hsu Ya-ching / Hu Ling-fang; Chen Qingchen / Jia Yifan	10; 21	21; 18	14; 21
3	(Chinese Taipei) (China)	Hung Yi-ting; He Bingjiao	14; 21	9; 21
4	(Chinese Taipei) (China)	Chang Ching-hui / Lee Chih-chen; Huang Dongping / Li Wenmei				not played
5	(Chinese Taipei) (China)	Yu Chien-hui; Han Yue				not played

== Semi-finals ==
=== Semi-final 1 ===
Japan
3
Ceres Arena Court 1
15 October 2021 19:00 UTC+2

Korea
1

			1	2	3
1	(Japan) (South Korea)	Akane Yamaguchi; An Se-young	14; 21	7; 21
2	(Japan) (South Korea)	Yuki Fukushima / Mayu Matsumoto; Lee So-hee / Shin Seung-chan	19; 21	21; 16	21; 14
3	(Japan) (South Korea)	Sayaka Takahashi; Kim Ga-eun	18; 21	21; 18	21; 14
4	(Japan) (South Korea)	Misaki Matsutomo / Nami Matsuyama; Kim So-yeong / Kong Hee-yong	21; 17	21; 18
5	(Japan) (South Korea)	Asuka Takahashi; Sim Yu-jin				not played

=== Semi-final 2 ===
Thailand
0
Ceres Arena Court 2
15 October 2021 19:00 UTC+2

China
3

			1	2	3
1	(Thailand) (China)	Ratchanok Intanon; Chen Yufei	2; 5			retired
2	(Thailand) (China)	Rawinda Prajongjai / Puttita Supajirakul; Chen Qingchen / Jia Yifan	15; 21	10; 21
3	(Thailand) (China)	Pornpawee Chochuwong; He Bingjiao	15; 21	16; 21
4	(Thailand) (China)	Jongkolphan Kititharakul / Sapsiree Taerattanachai; Huang Dongping / Li Wenmei				not played
5	(Thailand) (China)	Busanan Ongbamrungphan; Han Yue				not played

== Final ==
Japan
1
Ceres Arena Court 1
16 October 2021 19:00 UTC+2

China
3

			1	2	3
1	(Japan) (China)	Akane Yamaguchi; Chen Yufei	21; 18	21; 10
2	(Japan) (China)	Yuki Fukushima / Mayu Matsumoto; Chen Qingchen / Jia Yifan	27; 29	21; 15	18; 21
3	(Japan) (China)	Sayaka Takahashi; He Bingjiao	9; 21	18; 21
4	(Japan) (China)	Misaki Matsutomo / Nami Matsuyama; Huang Dongping / Li Wenmei	22; 24	21; 23
5	(Japan) (China)	Aya Ohori; Han Yue				not played
