= 2020 Thomas Cup knockout stage =

Badminton tournament

The knockout stage for the 2020 Thomas Cup in Aarhus, Denmark began on 15 October 2021 with the quarter-finals and ended on 17 October with the final.

== Qualified teams ==
The top two placed teams from each of the four groups qualified for this stage.

Group	Winners	Runners-up
A	Indonesia	Thailand
B	Denmark	Korea
C	China	India
D	Japan	Malaysia

== Bracket ==
The draw was conducted on 14 October 2021 after the last match of the group stage.

Quarter-finals
Indonesia	3
Malaysia	0
Denmark	3
India	1
Thailand	0
China	3
Korea	2
Japan	3

Semi-finals
Indonesia	3
Denmark	1
China	3
Japan	1

Final
Indonesia	3
China	0

== Quarter-finals ==
=== Quarter-final 1 ===
Indonesia
3
Ceres Arena Court 2
15 October 2021 13:30 UTC+2

Malaysia
0

			1	2	3
1	(Indonesia) (Malaysia)	Anthony Sinisuka Ginting; Lee Zii Jia	21; 15	21; 17
2	(Indonesia) (Malaysia)	Marcus Fernaldi Gideon / Kevin Sanjaya Sukamuljo; Aaron Chia / Soh Wooi Yik	21; 17	16; 21	21; 15
3	(Indonesia) (Malaysia)	Jonatan Christie; Ng Tze Yong	14; 21	21; 19	21; 16
4	(Indonesia) (Malaysia)	Fajar Alfian / Muhammad Rian Ardianto; Goh Sze Fei / Nur Izzuddin				not played
5	(Indonesia) (Malaysia)	Shesar Hiren Rhustavito; Leong Jun Hao				not played

=== Quarter-final 2 ===
Denmark
3
Ceres Arena Court 1
15 October 2021 13:30 UTC+2

India
1

			1	2	3
1	(Denmark) (India)	Viktor Axelsen; Srikanth Kidambi	21; 12	21; 13
2	(Denmark) (India)	Kim Astrup / Anders Skaarup Rasmussen; Satwiksairaj Rankireddy / Chirag Shetty	15; 21	21; 17	18; 21
3	(Denmark) (India)	Anders Antonsen; B. Sai Praneeth	21; 8	21; 15
4	(Denmark) (India)	Mathias Christiansen / Frederik Søgaard; Arjun M.R. / Dhruv Kapila	21; 16	21; 9
5	(Denmark) (India)	Rasmus Gemke; Sameer Verma				not played

=== Quarter-final 3 ===
Thailand
0
Ceres Arena Court 2
15 October 2021 8:30 UTC+2

China
3

			1	2	3
1	(Thailand) (China)	Kantaphon Wangcharoen; Shi Yuqi	14; 21	17; 21
2	(Thailand) (China)	Supak Jomkoh / Kittinupong Kedren; He Jiting / Zhou Haodong	10; 21	18; 21
3	(Thailand) (China)	Kunlavut Vitidsarn; Li Shifeng	13; 21	21; 17	7; 21
4	(Thailand) (China)	Dechapol Puavaranukroh / Nanthakarn Yordphaisong; Liu Cheng / Wang Yilyu				not played
5	(Thailand) (China)	Adulrach Namkul; Weng Hongyang				not played

=== Quarter-final 4 ===
Korea
2
Ceres Arena Court 1
15 October 2021 8:30 UTC+2

Japan
3

			1	2	3
1	(South Korea) (Japan)	Heo Kwang-hee; Kento Momota	21; 19	21; 17
2	(South Korea) (Japan)	Choi Sol-gyu / Seo Seung-jae; Takuro Hoki / Yugo Kobayashi	21; 18	21; 13
3	(South Korea) (Japan)	Jeon Hyeok-jin; Kanta Tsuneyama	10; 21	16; 21
4	(South Korea) (Japan)	Kang Min-hyuk / Kim Won-ho; Akira Koga / Yuta Watanabe	15; 21	18; 21
5	(South Korea) (Japan)	Cho Geon-yeop; Kenta Nishimoto	15; 21	10; 21

== Semi-finals ==
=== Semi-final 1 ===
Indonesia
3
Ceres Arena Court 1
16 October 2021 13:00 UTC+2

Denmark
1

			1	2	3
1	(Indonesia) (Denmark)	Anthony Sinisuka Ginting; Viktor Axelsen	9; 21	15; 21
2	(Indonesia) (Denmark)	Marcus Fernaldi Gideon / Kevin Sanjaya Sukamuljo; Kim Astrup / Anders Skaarup Rasmussen	21; 13	10; 21	21; 15
3	(Indonesia) (Denmark)	Jonatan Christie; Anders Antonsen	25; 23	15; 21	21; 16
4	(Indonesia) (Denmark)	Fajar Alfian / Muhammad Rian Ardianto; Mathias Christiansen / Frederik Søgaard	21; 14	21; 14
5	(Indonesia) (Denmark)	Shesar Hiren Rhustavito; Hans-Kristian Vittinghus				not played

=== Semi-final 2 ===
China
3
Ceres Arena Court 2
16 October 2021 13:00 UTC+2

Japan
1

			1	2	3
1	(China) (Japan)	Shi Yuqi; Kento Momota	20; 22	5; 20		retired
2	(China) (Japan)	He Jiting / Zhou Haodong; Takuro Hoki / Yuta Watanabe	21; 17	7; 21	21; 16
3	(China) (Japan)	Li Shifeng; Kanta Tsuneyama	21; 17	21; 15
4	(China) (Japan)	Liu Cheng / Wang Yilyu; Akira Koga / Taichi Saito	21; 11	22; 20
5	(China) (Japan)	Weng Hongyang; Kenta Nishimoto				not played

== Final ==
Indonesia
3
Ceres Arena Court 1
17 October 2021 13:00 UTC+2

China
0

			1	2	3
1	(Indonesia) (China)	Anthony Sinisuka Ginting; Lu Guangzu	18; 21	21; 14	21; 16
2	(Indonesia) (China)	Fajar Alfian / Muhammad Rian Ardianto; He Jiting / Zhou Haodong	21; 12	21; 19
3	(Indonesia) (China)	Jonatan Christie; Li Shifeng	21; 14	18; 21	21; 14
4	(Indonesia) (China)	Daniel Marthin / Kevin Sanjaya Sukamuljo; Liu Cheng / Wang Yilyu				not played
5	(Indonesia) (China)	Shesar Hiren Rhustavito; Weng Hongyang				not played
