= 2022 Badminton Asia Team Championships – Men's team event =

Men's team at the 2022 Badminton Asia Team Championships
- Venue: Setia City Convention Centre
- Location: Shah Alam, Selangor, Malaysia
- Dates: 15–20 February 2022
- Nations: 8

Medalists
gold medal	Malaysia
silver medal	Indonesia
bronze medal	South Korea
bronze medal	Singapore

The men's team event at the 2022 Badminton Asia Team Championships took place from 15 to 20 February at the Setia City Convention Centre in Shah Alam, Selangor, Malaysia. Indonesia were the defending champions.

== Seeds ==
The seeds were announced on 25 January 2022 based on the BWF World Team Rankings.

1. Indonesia (final)
2. Japan (group stage)

== Group stage ==
The draw was held on 8 February 2022. The men's team group stages consist of 2 groups: A and B.

Group A	Group B
Indonesia (1); India; South Korea; Hong Kong	Japan (2); Malaysia; Singapore; Kazakhstan

All times are Malaysia Standard Time (UTC+08:00).

=== Group A ===
Pos	Team	Pld	W	L	MF	MA	MD	GF	GA	GD	PF	PA	PD	Pts	Qualification
1	Indonesia	3	3	0	10	5	+5	22	15	+7	706	657	+49	3	Knockout stage
2	South Korea	3	2	1	11	4	+7	25	9	+16	679	549	+130	2	Knockout stage
3	India	3	1	2	5	10	−5	14	22	−8	595	700	−105	1	
4	Hong Kong	3	0	3	4	11	−7	11	26	−15	643	717	−74	0	

Source: TS

==== Indonesia vs Hong Kong ====
Indonesia
4
Setia City Convention Centre, Court 1
15 February 2022, 16:00

Hong Kong
1

			1	2	3
1	(Indonesia) (Hong Kong)	Chico Aura Dwi Wardoyo; Lee Cheuk Yiu	21; 14	18; 21	21; 18
2	(Indonesia) (Hong Kong)	Pramudya Kusumawardana / Yeremia Rambitan; Law Cheuk Him / Lee Chun Hei	12; 21	21; 18	20; 22
3	(Indonesia) (Hong Kong)	Ikhsan Rumbay; Chan Yin Chak	16; 21	22; 20	21; 17
4	(Indonesia) (Hong Kong)	Leo Rolly Carnando / Daniel Marthin; Ho Wai Lun / Yeung Ming Nok	22; 20	21; 16
5	(Indonesia) (Hong Kong)	Christian Adinata; Jason Gunawan	21; 15	21; 14

==== India vs South Korea ====
India
0
Setia City Convention Centre, Court 2
15 February 2022, 16:00

South Korea
5

			1	2	3
1	(India) (South Korea)	Lakshya Sen; Jeon Hyeok-jin	11; 21	19; 21
2	(India) (South Korea)	Ravikrishna P. S. / Sankar Prasad Udayakumar; Kim Hwi-tae / Kim Jae-hwan	8; 21	10; 21
3	(India) (South Korea)	Kiran George; Kim Joo-wan	18; 21	14; 21
4	(India) (South Korea)	Manjit Singh Khwairakpam / Dingku Singh Konthoujam; Jin Yong / Na Sung-seung	7; 21	15; 21
5	(India) (South Korea)	Mithun Manjunath; Jeong Min-sun	16; 21	27; 25	14; 21

==== Indonesia vs South Korea ====
Indonesia
3
Setia City Convention Centre, Court 1
17 February 2022, 10:00

South Korea
2

			1	2	3
1	(Indonesia) (South Korea)	Chico Aura Dwi Wardoyo; Jeon Hyeok-jin	21; 18	15; 21	21; 19
2	(Indonesia) (South Korea)	Pramudya Kusumawardana / Yeremia Rambitan; Jin Yong / Na Sung-seung	10; 21	19; 21
3	(Indonesia) (South Korea)	Ikhsan Rumbay; Kim Joo-wan	18; 21	14; 21
4	(Indonesia) (South Korea)	Leo Rolly Carnando / Daniel Marthin; Noh Jin-seong / Yun Dae-il	21; 13	21; 13
5	(Indonesia) (South Korea)	Christian Adinata; Jeong Min-sun	21; 19	11; 21	21; 17

==== India vs Hong Kong ====
India
3
Setia City Convention Centre, Court 2
17 February 2022, 10:00

Hong Kong
2

			1	2	3
1	(India) (Hong Kong)	Lakshya Sen; Lee Cheuk Yiu	21; 19	21; 10
2	(India) (Hong Kong)	Manjit Singh Khwairakpam / Dingku Singh Konthoujam; Law Cheuk Him / Lee Chun Hei	22; 20	15; 21	18; 21
3	(India) (Hong Kong)	Kiran George; Chan Yin Chak	13; 21	21; 17	9; 21
4	(India) (Hong Kong)	Hariharan Amsakarunan / Ruban Kumar Rethinasabapathi; Chow Hin Long / Lui Chun Wai	21; 17	21; 16
5	(India) (Hong Kong)	Mithun Manjunath; Jason Gunawan	21; 14	17; 21	21; 11

==== Indonesia vs India ====
Indonesia
3
Setia City Convention Centre, Court 1
18 February 2022, 10:00

India
2

			1	2	3
1	(Indonesia) (India)	Chico Aura Dwi Wardoyo; Lakshya Sen	18; 21	25; 27
2	(Indonesia) (India)	Leo Rolly Carnando / Daniel Marthin; Manjit Singh Khwairakpam / Dingku Singh Konthoujam	21; 16	21; 10
3	(Indonesia) (India)	Ikhsan Rumbay; Kiran George	21; 13	17; 21	21; 10
4	(Indonesia) (India)	Muhammad Shohibul Fikri / Bagas Maulana; Hariharan Amsakarunan / Ruban Kumar Rethinasabapathi	21; 10	21; 10
5	(Indonesia) (India)	Yonathan Ramlie; Mithun Manjunath	12; 21	21; 15	17; 21

==== South Korea vs Hong Kong ====
South Korea
4
Setia City Convention Centre, Court 2
18 February 2022, 10:00

Hong Kong
1

			1	2	3
1	(South Korea) (Hong Kong)	Jeon Hyeok-jin; Ng Ka Long	21; 17	21; 18
2	(South Korea) (Hong Kong)	Kim Hwi-tae / Kim Jae-hwan; Ho Wai Lun / Yeung Ming Nok	21; 16	21; 12
3	(South Korea) (Hong Kong)	Kim Joo-wan; Chan Yin Chak	21; 19	13; 21	17; 21
4	(South Korea) (Hong Kong)	Jin Yong / Na Sung-seung; Chow Hin Long / Lui Chun Wai	21; 11	21; 9
5	(South Korea) (Hong Kong)	Jeong Min-sun; Jason Gunawan	21; 16	21; 17

=== Group B ===
Pos	Team	Pld	W	L	MF	MA	MD	GF	GA	GD	PF	PA	PD	Pts	Qualification
1	Malaysia (H)	3	3	0	13	2	+11	27	7	+20	688	483	+205	3	Knockout stage
2	Singapore	3	2	1	8	7	+1	18	16	+2	610	572	+38	2	Knockout stage
3	Japan	3	1	2	9	6	+3	22	14	+8	692	578	+114	1	
4	Kazakhstan	3	0	3	0	15	−15	0	30	−30	273	630	−357	0	

Source: TS
(H) Host

==== Malaysia vs Singapore ====
Malaysia
5
Setia City Convention Centre, Court 1
16 February 2022, 16:00

Singapore
0

			1	2	3
1	(Malaysia) (Singapore)	Lee Zii Jia; Loh Kean Yew	21; 6	21; 14
2	(Malaysia) (Singapore)	Aaron Chia / Soh Wooi Yik; Danny Bawa Chrisnanta / Wesley Koh	21; 14	21; 12
3	(Malaysia) (Singapore)	Ng Tze Yong; Jason Teh	17; 21	24; 22	21; 19
4	(Malaysia) (Singapore)	Goh Sze Fei / Nur Izzuddin; Terry Hee / Andy Kwek	21; 10	21; 13
5	(Malaysia) (Singapore)	Leong Jun Hao; Joel Koh	21; 17	22; 20

==== Japan vs Kazakhstan ====
Japan
5
Setia City Convention Centre, Court 2
16 February 2022, 16:00

Kazakhstan
0

			1	2	3
1	(Japan) (Kazakhstan)	Riku Hatano; Artur Niyazov	21; 14	21; 9
2	(Japan) (Kazakhstan)	Koo Takahashi; Khaitmurat Kulmatov	21; 12	21; 16
3	(Japan) (Kazakhstan)	Koshiro Moriguchi; Andrey Shalagin	21; 5	21; 4
4	(Japan) (Kazakhstan)	Shuntaro Mezaki / Haruya Nishida; Jangir Ibrayev / Ilya Lysenko	21; 9	21; 7
5	(Japan) (Kazakhstan)	Ayato Endo / Yuta Takei; Andrey Shalagin / Makhsut Tajibullayev	21; 11	21; 12

==== Japan vs Singapore ====
Japan
2
Setia City Convention Centre, Court 1
17 February 2022, 16:00

Singapore
3

			1	2	3
1	(Japan) (Singapore)	Riku Hatano; Loh Kean Yew	16; 21	15; 21
2	(Japan) (Singapore)	Ayato Endo / Yuta Takei; Wesley Koh / Andy Kwek	21; 12	19; 21	21; 15
3	(Japan) (Singapore)	Koo Takahashi; Jason Teh	15; 21	21; 13	18; 21
4	(Japan) (Singapore)	Shuntaro Mezaki / Haruya Nishida; Danny Bawa Chrisnanta / Terry Hee	18; 21	21; 18	19; 21
5	(Japan) (Singapore)	Koshiro Moriguchi; Joel Koh	21; 10	21; 17

==== Malaysia vs Kazakhstan ====
Malaysia
5
Setia City Convention Centre, Court 2
17 February 2022, 16:00

Kazakhstan
0

			1	2	3
1	(Malaysia) (Kazakhstan)	Aidil Sholeh; Artur Niyazov	21; 11	21; 12
2	(Malaysia) (Kazakhstan)	Lim Chong King; Khaitmurat Kulmatov	21; 11	21; 11
3	(Malaysia) (Kazakhstan)	Kok Jing Hong; Makhsut Tajibullayev	21; 8	21; 4
4	(Malaysia) (Kazakhstan)	Man Wei Chong / Tee Kai Wun; Jangir Ibrayev / Ilya Lysenko	21; 5	21; 5
5	(Malaysia) (Kazakhstan)	Goh Sze Fei / Nur Izzuddin; Andrey Shalagin / Makhsut Tajibullayev	21; 8	21; 4

==== Japan vs Malaysia ====
Japan
2
Setia City Convention Centre, Court 1
18 February 2022, 16:00

Malaysia
3

			1	2	3
1	(Japan) (Malaysia)	Riku Hatano; Lee Zii Jia	21; 15	6; 21	15; 21
2	(Japan) (Malaysia)	Ayato Endo / Yuta Takei; Aaron Chia / Soh Wooi Yik	23; 21	21; 16
3	(Japan) (Malaysia)	Koo Takahashi; Aidil Sholeh	19; 21	21; 16	21; 15
4	(Japan) (Malaysia)	Shuntaro Mezaki / Haruya Nishida; Goh Sze Fei / Nur Izzuddin	21; 17	17; 21	17; 21
5	(Japan) (Malaysia)	Koshiro Moriguchi; Leong Jun Hao	18; 21	16; 21

==== Singapore vs Kazakhstan ====
Singapore
5
Setia City Convention Centre, Court 2
18 February 2022, 16:00

Kazakhstan
0

			1	2	3
1	(Singapore) (Kazakhstan)	Loh Kean Yew; Artur Niyazov	21; 12	21; 17
2	(Singapore) (Kazakhstan)	Jason Teh; Khaitmurat Kulmatov	21; 12	21; 8
3	(Singapore) (Kazakhstan)	Lim Ming Hong; Makhsut Tajibullayev	21; 12	21; 14
4	(Singapore) (Kazakhstan)	Wesley Koh / Junsuke Kubo; Jangir Ibrayev / Ilya Lysenko	21; 3	21; 5
5	(Singapore) (Kazakhstan)	Danny Bawa Chrisnanta / Andy Kwek; Andrey Shalagin / Makhsut Tajibullayev	21; 7	21; 5

== Knockout stage ==
=== Bracket ===
Semi-finals
19 February 16:00
Indonesia (1)	3
Singapore	2
19 February 16:00
South Korea	0
Malaysia	3

Final
20 February 16:00
Indonesia (1)	0
Malaysia	3

=== Semi-finals ===
==== South Korea vs Malaysia ====
South Korea
0
Setia City Convention Centre, Court 1
19 February 2022, 16:00

Malaysia
3

			1	2	3
1	(South Korea) (Malaysia)	Jeon Hyeok-jin; Lee Zii Jia	21; 13	13; 21	15; 21
2	(South Korea) (Malaysia)	Kim Hwi-tae / Kim Jae-hwan; Aaron Chia / Soh Wooi Yik	14; 21	22; 20	19; 21
3	(South Korea) (Malaysia)	Kim Joo-wan; Ng Tze Yong	21; 19	16; 21	12; 21
4	(South Korea) (Malaysia)	Jin Yong / Na Sung-seung; Goh Sze Fei / Nur Izzuddin				not played
5	(South Korea) (Malaysia)	Jeong Min-sun; Leong Jun Hao				not played

==== Indonesia vs Singapore ====
Indonesia
3
Setia City Convention Centre, Court 2
19 February 2022, 16:00

Singapore
2

			1	2	3
1	(Indonesia) (Singapore)	Chico Aura Dwi Wardoyo; Loh Kean Yew	17; 21	19; 21
2	(Indonesia) (Singapore)	Leo Rolly Carnando / Daniel Marthin; Wesley Koh / Andy Kwek	21; 16	21; 12
3	(Indonesia) (Singapore)	Ikhsan Rumbay; Jason Teh	21; 18	8; 21	9; 21
4	(Indonesia) (Singapore)	Muhammad Shohibul Fikri / Bagas Maulana; Danny Bawa Chrisnanta / Terry Hee	15; 21	21; 11	21; 15
5	(Indonesia) (Singapore)	Christian Adinata; Joel Koh	21; 11	21; 14

=== Final ===
==== Indonesia vs Malaysia ====
Indonesia
0
Setia City Convention Centre, Court 1
20 February 2022, 16:00

Malaysia
3

			1	2	3
1	(Indonesia) (Malaysia)	Chico Aura Dwi Wardoyo; Lee Zii Jia	21; 14	12; 21	10; 21
2	(Indonesia) (Malaysia)	Leo Rolly Carnando / Daniel Marthin; Aaron Chia / Soh Wooi Yik	21; 17	13; 21	18; 21
3	(Indonesia) (Malaysia)	Ikhsan Rumbay; Ng Tze Yong	14; 21	15; 21
4	(Indonesia) (Malaysia)	Muhammad Shohibul Fikri / Bagas Maulana; Goh Sze Fei / Nur Izzuddin				not played
5	(Indonesia) (Malaysia)	Christian Adinata; Leong Jun Hao				not played

== Final ranking ==
Pos	Team	Pld	W	L	Pts	MD	GD	PD	Final result
1st place, gold medalist(s)	Malaysia	5	5	0	10	+17	+27	+263	Champions
2nd place, silver medalist(s)	Indonesia	5	5	1	10	+3	+5	+29	Runners-up
3rd place, bronze medalist(s)	South Korea	5	4	1	8	+4	+13	+105	Eliminated in semi-finals
3rd place, bronze medalist(s)	Singapore	5	4	1	8	0	0	+25	Eliminated in semi-finals
5	Japan	4	2	2	4	+3	+8	+114	Eliminated in group stage
6	India	4	2	2	4	−5	−8	−105	Eliminated in group stage
7	Hong Kong	4	2	2	4	−7	−15	−74	Eliminated in group stage
8	Kazakhstan	3	1	2	2	−15	−30	−357	Eliminated in group stage
