= Ceres Arena =

Sports venue in Aarhus, Denmark

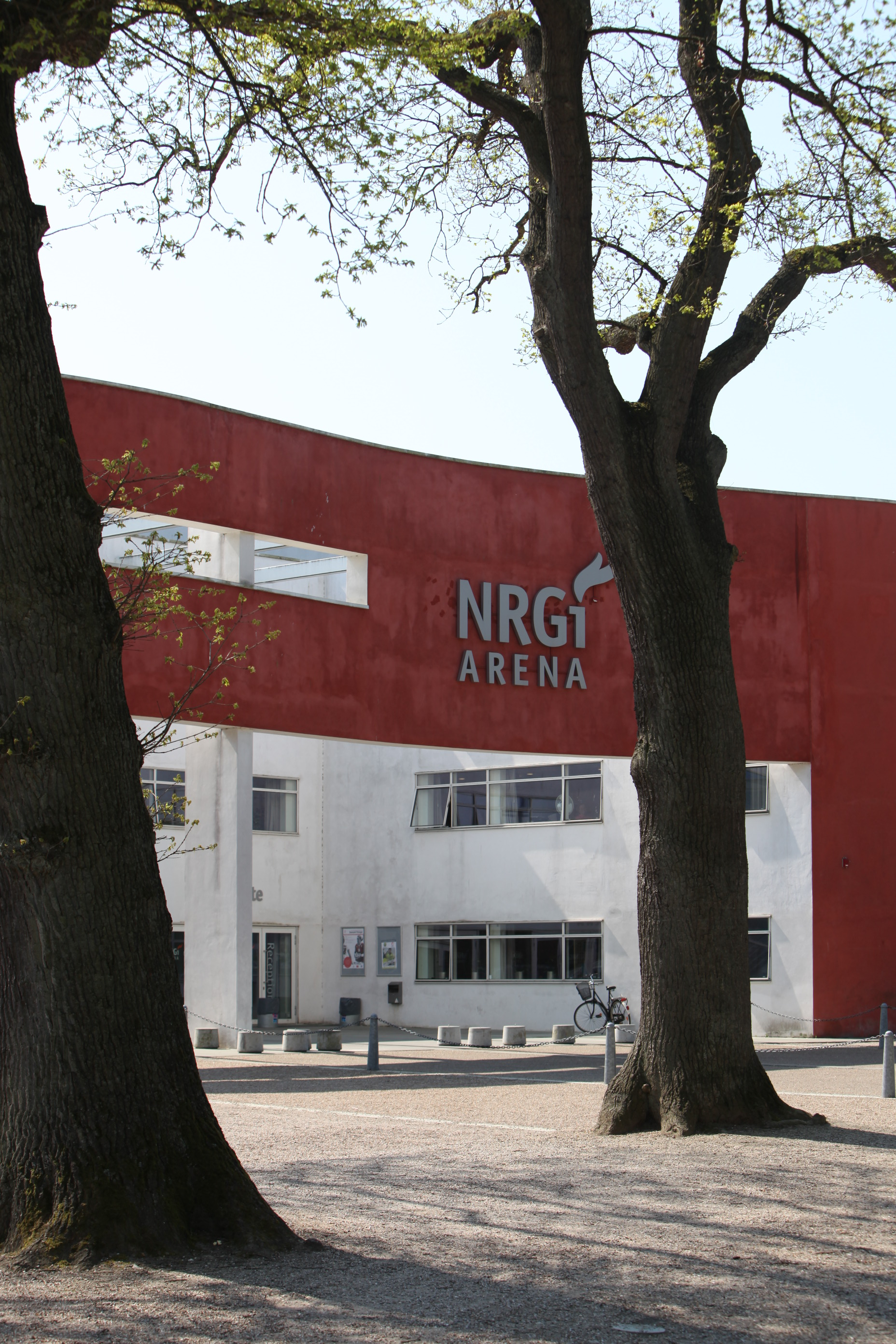
- Interactive map of Ceres Arena
- Former names: NRGi Arena
- Location: Aarhus, Denmark
- Coordinates: 56°07′55″N 10°11′37″E
- Owner: Ceres Park & Arena
- Capacity: 5,001 (4,394 seats)

Construction
- Opened: 2001

Tenants
- Aarhus United (2017 –present); Skanderborg Aarhus Håndbold (2021 –present); Aarhus Håndbold (2001–2021); Bakken Bears (till 2012, 2015–present)

Ceres Arena (formerly NRGi Arena) is an indoor arena mainly used for handball matches and public events in Aarhus, Denmark. The arena was opened in 2001 and has a capacity of 5,001 spectators (4,394 seats). It is part of the Aarhus Sports Park, which also includes Aarhus Stadium.

Ceres Arena is home to Danish Women's Handball League team Aarhus United and Danish Men's Handball League team Skanderborg Aarhus Håndbold. The arena functioned as the main venue in the 2002 European Women's Championships, hosting the final. The arena was also used for basketball, by Bakken Bears, but because of the high price for renting the arena, Bakken Bears moved back to there old home Vejlby-Risskov Hallen. Since, it has only played selected games in the arena, including some European appearances.

In non-sports, the 2004 Danish Song Contest was held in this arena. The Danish women national handball team also play some matches.

== Store Hal ==
Store Hal is Ceres Park & Arena's second indoor exhibition arena primarily used by Team Århus Floorball, and it seats approximately 1,500 spectators. The original name for the arena was Nye Stadionhal.

During the German occupation in World War II Store Hal suffered an unfortunate fate. The Germans seized all halls in Atletion for their own use, which in 1943 resulted in an act of sabotage from the Danish resistance movement. Store Hal burned down to the ground and was not rebuild until early 1954 where the current building was finished. It was designed by architect C. F. Møller in the same style as the old.

In 2006 Store Hal was renamed NRGi Store Hal, when local energy company NRGi, bought the naming rights for Atletion.

== See also ==
- List of indoor arenas in Denmark
- List of indoor arenas in Nordic countries
