= Team Århus Floorball =

Team Århus Floorball is a Danish floorball club playing in the Danish Floorball League for both men and women.

The club's male team has played in the highest league since 1995 and in 2010 the team won the Danish Floorball Championship as well as the Danish Cup.

The current general manager is Jens Ørhøj and the head coach is Urban Nilsson.

== Players ==
=== Current roster ===
Updated December 31, 2010.

No.	Nat	Player	Pos	S/G	Age	Acquired	Birthplace
1	(Denmark)	Casper Theilgaard	G	L	37	2003	Århus, Denmark
18	(Denmark)	Christoffer Pahle	C	L	39	2006	Skanderborg, Denmark
21	(Denmark)	Anders Kristensen	W	L	41	2004	Frederikshavn, Denmark
91	(Faroe Islands)	Ari Knoph	W	L	34	2010	Frederikshavn, Denmark
