= 2020 Badminton Asia Team Championships women's team squads =

This article lists the latest women's squads lists for badminton's 2020 Badminton Asia Team Championships. Ranking stated are based on world ranking date for 4 February 2020 as per tournament's prospectus.

== Group W ==
Group W consists of Japan, and Malaysia.

=== Japan ===
Name	DoB/Age	WS Rank	WD Rank
Akane Yamaguchi	6 June 1997 (aged 22)	3	-
Sayaka Takahashi	29 July 1992 (aged 27)	11	-
Aya Ohori	2 October 1996 (aged 23)	19	-
Riko Gunji	31 July 2002 (aged 17)	191	-
Mayu Matsumoto	7 August 1995 (aged 24)	-	2
Wakana Nagahara	9 January 1996 (aged 24)	-	2
Yuki Fukushima	6 May 1993 (aged 26)	-	3
Sayaka Hirota	1 August 1994 (aged 25)	-	3
Nami Matsuyama	28 June 1998 (aged 21)	-	11
Chiharu Shida	29 April 1997 (aged 22)	-	11

=== Malaysia ===
Name	DoB/Age	WS Rank	WD Rank
Soniia Cheah Su Ya	19 June 1993 (aged 26)	31	-
Goh Jin Wei	30 January 2000 (aged 20)	83	-
Kisona Selvaduray	1 October 1998 (aged 21)	106	-
Eoon Qi Xuan	2 November 2000 (aged 19)	160	-
Chow Mei Kuan	23 December 1994 (aged 25)	-	15
Lee Meng Yean	30 March 1994 (aged 25)	-	15
Vivian Hoo	19 March 1990 (aged 29)	-	28
Yap Cheng Wen	4 January 1995 (aged 25)	-	28
Pearly Tan	14 March 2000 (aged 19)	-	41
Thinaah Muralitharan	3 January 1998 (aged 22)	-	41

== Group X ==
Group X consists of Korea, and Kazakhstan.

=== Korea ===
Name	DoB/Age	WS Rank	WD Rank
An Se-young	5 February 2002 (aged 18)	9	-
Sung Ji-hyun	29 July 1991 (aged 28)	12	-
Kim Ga-eun	7 February 1998 (aged 22)	16	-
Sim Yu-jin	13 May 1999 (aged 20)	47	-
Lee So-hee	14 June 1994 (aged 25)	-	4
Shin Seung-chan	6 December 1994 (aged 25)	-	4
Kim So-yeong	9 July 1992 (aged 27)	-	5
Kong Hee-yong	11 December 1996 (aged 23)	-	5
Chang Ye-na	13 December 1989 (aged 30)	-	10
Kim Hye-rin	19 May 1995 (aged 24)	-	10

=== Kazakhstan ===
Name	DoB/Age	WS Rank	WD Rank
Aisha Zhumabek	7 June 2000 (aged 19)	361	637
Veronika Sorokina		516	-
Kamila Smagulova	14 June 1997 (aged 22)	562	637
Arina Sazonova	23 December 1988 (aged 31)	755	637
Oxsana Shtelle	30 April 1998 (aged 21)	755	637

== Group Y ==
Group Y consists of Thailand, Indonesia, and Philippines.

=== Thailand ===
Name	DoB/Age	WS Rank	WD Rank
Busanan Ongbamrungphan	22 March 1996 (aged 23)	15	-
Pornpawee Chochuwong	22 January 1998 (aged 22)	19	-
Nitchaon Jindapol	31 March 1991 (aged 28)	22	-
Phittayaporn Chaiwan	21 February 2001 (aged 18)	34	-
Supanida Katethong	26 October 1997 (aged 22)	48	-
Jongkolphan Kititharakul	1 March 1993 (aged 26)	-	12
Rawinda Prajongjai	29 June 1993 (aged 26)	-	12
Chayanit Chaladchalam	8 March 1991 (aged 28)	-	34
Phataimas Muenwong	5 July 1995 (aged 24)	-	34
Chasinee Korepap	28 April 2000 (aged 19)	-	51

=== Indonesia ===
Name	DoB/Age	WS Rank	WD Rank
Gregoria Mariska Tunjung	11 August 1999 (aged 20)	24	-
Ruselli Hartawan	27 December 1997 (aged 22)	37	-
Choirunnisa	31 August 1999 (aged 20)	77	-
Putri Kusuma Wardani	20 July 2002 (aged 17)	273	-
Greysia Polii	11 August 1987 (aged 32)	-	8
Apriyani Rahayu	29 April 1998 (aged 21)	-	8
Siti Fadia Silva Ramadhanti	16 November 2000 (aged 19)	-	37
Ribka Sugiarto	22 January 2000 (aged 20)	-	37
Ni Ketut Mahadewi Istarani	12 September 1994 (aged 25)	-	67
Tania Oktaviani Kusumah	13 October 1998 (aged 21)	-	67

=== Philippines ===
Name	DoB/Age	WS Rank	WD Rank
Nicole Albo	15 March 1999 (aged 20)	319	-
Bianca Carlos	22 September 1995 (aged 24)	N/A	-
Sarah Barredo	17 October 1999 (aged 20)	N/A	-
Alyssa Leonardo	15 September 1997 (aged 22)	-	262
Thea Pomar	25 January 1998 (aged 22)	-	262
Geva De Vera	10 December 1997 (aged 22)	-	638
Chanelle Lunod	5 December 1999 (aged 20)	-	638
Mikaela de Guzman	25 October 2001 (aged 18)	-	-

== Group Z ==
Group Z consists of Chinese Taipei, and Singapore.

=== Chinese Taipei ===
Name	DoB/Age	WS Rank	WD Rank
Pai Yu-po	18 April 1991 (aged 28)	40	85
Chiang Ying-li	8 October 1992 (aged 27)	87	-
Hung Yi-ting	4 May 1997 (aged 22)	136	275
Hsu Ya-ching	30 July 1991 (aged 28)	-	25
Hu Ling-fang	4 June 1998 (aged 21)	-	25
Cheng Chi-ya	26 December 1992 (aged 27)	-	36
Kuo Yu-wen	5 November 1991 (aged 28)	-	69
Lin Wan-ching	1 November 1995 (aged 24)	-	69
Liu Chiao-yun	12 August 1997 (aged 22)	-	96
Wang Yu-qiao	18 July 2000 (aged 19)	-	96

=== Singapore ===
Name	DoB/Age	WS Rank	WD Rank
Yeo Jia Min	1 February 1999 (aged 21)	25	-
Jaslyn Hooi	5 October 2000 (aged 19)	98	169
Grace Chua	1 March 1996 (aged 23)	117	311
Sito Jia Rong	23 June 2000 (aged 19)	302	-
Insyirah Khan	12 September 2001 (aged 18)	358	311
Jin Yujia	6 February 1997 (aged 23)	-	98
Crystal Wong	2 August 1999 (aged 20)	-	169
Ker'sara Koh	28 April 1998 (aged 21)	-	288
