= 2020 Badminton Asia Team Championships – Women's team event =

Women's team at the 2020 Badminton Asia Team Championships
- Venue: Rizal Memorial Coliseum
- Location: Manila, Philippines
- Dates: 11–16 February 2020
- Nations: 9

Medalists
gold medal	Japan
silver medal	South Korea
bronze medal	Thailand
bronze medal	Malaysia

The women's team event at the 2020 Badminton Asia Team Championships took place from 11 to 16 February at the Rizal Memorial Coliseum in Manila, Philippines. Japan were the defending champions.

== Seeds ==
The seeds were announced on 21 January 2020 based on the BWF World Team Rankings.

1. Japan (champions)
2. China (withdrew)
3. South Korea (final)
4. Thailand (semi-finals)
5. Indonesia (quarter-finals)
6. Chinese Taipei (quarter-finals)
7. India (withdrew)
8. Malaysia (semi-finals)

== Group stage ==
The draw was held on 29 January 2020. The women's team group stages consist of 4 groups: W, X, Y and Z.

Group W	Group X	Group Y	Group Z
Japan (1); Malaysia (8)	South Korea (3); Kazakhstan	Thailand (4); Indonesia (5); Philippines	Chinese Taipei (6); Singapore

== Group stage ==
All times are Philippines Standard Time (UTC+08:00).

=== Group W ===
Pos	Team	Pld	W	L	MF	MA	MD	GF	GA	GD	PF	PA	PD	Pts	Qualification
1	Japan	1	1	0	3	2	+1	7	5	+2	226	205	+21	1	Knockout stage
2	Malaysia	1	0	1	2	3	−1	5	7	−2	205	226	−21	0	Knockout stage

Source: TS

==== Japan vs Malaysia ====
Japan
3
Rizal Memorial Coliseum, Court 2
13 February 2020, 10:00

Malaysia
2

			1	2	3
1	(Japan) (Malaysia)	Akane Yamaguchi; Soniia Cheah Su Ya	16; 21	21; 13	18; 21
2	(Japan) (Malaysia)	Yuki Fukushima / Sayaka Hirota; Chow Mei Kuan / Lee Meng Yean	21; 11	21; 15
3	(Japan) (Malaysia)	Sayaka Takahashi; Goh Jin Wei	21; 18	21; 12
4	(Japan) (Malaysia)	Nami Matsuyama / Chiharu Shida; Pearly Tan / Thinaah Muralitharan	21; 15	18; 21	21; 16
5	(Japan) (Malaysia)	Aya Ohori; Kisona Selvaduray	14; 21	13; 21

=== Group X ===
Pos	Team	Pld	W	L	MF	MA	MD	GF	GA	GD	PF	PA	PD	Pts	Qualification
1	South Korea	1	1	0	5	0	+5	10	0	+10	210	47	+163	1	Knockout stage
2	Kazakhstan	1	0	1	0	5	−5	0	10	−10	47	210	−163	0	Knockout stage

Source: TS

==== South Korea vs Kazakhstan ====
South Korea
5
Rizal Memorial Coliseum, Court 2
11 February 2020, 16:00

Kazakhstan
0

			1	2	3
1	(South Korea) (Kazakhstan)	Sung Ji-hyun; Aisha Zhumabek	21; 4	21; 3
2	(South Korea) (Kazakhstan)	Kim Ga-eun; Kamila Smagulova	21; 5	21; 10
3	(South Korea) (Kazakhstan)	Sim Yu-jin; Oxsana Shtelle	21; 4	21; 3
4	(South Korea) (Kazakhstan)	Kim So-yeong / Kong Hee-yong; Kamila Smagulova / Aisha Zhumabek	21; 6	21; 2
5	(South Korea) (Kazakhstan)	Lee So-hee / Shin Seung-chan; Arina Sazonova / Oxsana Shtelle	21; 5	21; 5

=== Group Y ===
Pos	Team	Pld	W	L	MF	MA	MD	GF	GA	GD	PF	PA	PD	Pts	Qualification
1	Thailand	2	2	0	8	2	+6	16	6	+10	426	336	+90	2	Knockout stage
2	Indonesia	2	1	1	7	3	+4	16	7	+9	448	363	+85	1	Knockout stage
3	Philippines	2	0	2	0	10	−10	1	20	−19	264	439	−175	0	

Source: TS

==== Thailand vs Philippines ====
Thailand
5
Rizal Memorial Coliseum, Court 1
11 February 2020, 10:00

Philippines
0

			1	2	3
1	(Thailand) (Philippines)	Busanan Ongbamrungphan; Nicole Albo	21; 8	21; 10
2	(Thailand) (Philippines)	Pornpawee Chochuwong; Bianca Carlos	21; 15	21; 12
3	(Thailand) (Philippines)	Chasinee Korepap; Sarah Barredo	21; 14	21; 15
4	(Thailand) (Philippines)	Jongkolphan Kititharakul / Rawinda Prajongjai; Alyssa Leonardo / Thea Pomar	21; 12	21; 13
5	(Thailand) (Philippines)	Chasinee Korepap / Phataimas Muenwong; Geva de Vera / Chanelle Lunod	21; 10	21; 8

==== Indonesia vs Philippines ====
Indonesia
5
Rizal Memorial Coliseum, Court 1
12 February 2020, 10:00

Philippines
0

			1	2	3
1	(Indonesia) (Philippines)	Gregoria Mariska Tunjung; Nicole Albo	19; 21	21; 11	21; 9
2	(Indonesia) (Philippines)	Greysia Polii / Apriyani Rahayu; Alyssa Leonardo / Thea Pomar	21; 18	21; 12
3	(Indonesia) (Philippines)	Ruselli Hartawan; Bianca Carlos	21; 10	21; 18
4	(Indonesia) (Philippines)	Siti Fadia Silva Ramadhanti / Ribka Sugiarto; Geva de Vera / Chanelle Lunod	21; 7	21; 8
5	(Indonesia) (Philippines)	Putri Kusuma Wardani; Sarah Barredo	21; 19	21; 14

==== Thailand vs Indonesia ====
Thailand
3
Rizal Memorial Coliseum, Court 1
13 February 2020, 10:00

Indonesia
2

			1	2	3
1	(Thailand) (Indonesia)	Busanan Ongbamrungphan; Gregoria Mariska Tunjung	16; 21	12; 21
2	(Thailand) (Indonesia)	Jongkolphan Kititharakul / Rawinda Prajongjai; Ni Ketut Mahadewi Istarani / Apriyani Rahayu	21; 13	15; 21	21; 17
3	(Thailand) (Indonesia)	Pornpawee Chochuwong; Ruselli Hartawan	21; 19	18; 21	21; 16
4	(Thailand) (Indonesia)	Chayanit Chaladchalam / Phataimas Muenwong; Siti Fadia Silva Ramadhanti / Ribka Sugiarto	17; 21	12; 21
5	(Thailand) (Indonesia)	Phittayaporn Chaiwan; Choirunnisa	21; 18	21; 10

=== Group Z ===
Pos	Team	Pld	W	L	MF	MA	MD	GF	GA	GD	PF	PA	PD	Pts	Qualification
1	Chinese Taipei	1	1	0	3	2	+1	8	6	+2	260	247	+13	1	Knockout stage
2	Singapore	1	0	1	2	3	−1	6	8	−2	247	260	−13	0	Knockout stage

Source: TS

==== Chinese Taipei vs Singapore ====
Chinese Taipei
3
Rizal Memorial Coliseum, Court 4
13 February 2020, 10:00

Singapore
2

			1	2	3
1	(Chinese Taipei) (Singapore)	Pai Yu-po; Yeo Jia Min	21; 19	17; 21	21; 16
2	(Chinese Taipei) (Singapore)	Chiang Ying-li; Jaslyn Hooi	14; 21	21; 13	12; 21
3	(Chinese Taipei) (Singapore)	Hsu Ya-ching / Hu Ling-fang; Jin Yujia / Crystal Wong	21; 19	21; 15
4	(Chinese Taipei) (Singapore)	Hung Yi-ting; Grace Chua	16; 21	21; 18	16; 21
5	(Chinese Taipei) (Singapore)	Kuo Yu-wen / Lin Wan-ching; Jaslyn Hooi / Yeo Jia Min	21; 10	17; 21	21; 11

== Knockout stage ==
=== Bracket ===
Quarter-finals
14 February 10:00
Japan (1)	3
Indonesia (5)	0
14 February 10:10
Chinese Taipei (6)	1
Malaysia (8)	3
14 February 10:10
Kazakhstan	0
Thailand (4)	3
14 February 10:10
Singapore	0
South Korea (3)	3

Semi-finals
15 February 10:00
Japan (1)	3
Malaysia (8)	0
15 February 10:00
Thailand (4)	1
South Korea (3)	3

Final
16 February 10:00
Japan (1)	3
South Korea	0

=== Quarter-finals ===
==== Japan vs Indonesia ====
Japan
3
Rizal Memorial Coliseum, Court 1
14 February 2020, 10:00

Indonesia
0

			1	2	3
1	(Japan) (Indonesia)	Akane Yamaguchi; Gregoria Mariska Tunjung	21; 9	21; 15
2	(Japan) (Indonesia)	Yuki Fukushima / Sayaka Hirota; Greysia Polii / Apriyani Rahayu	21; 19	21; 15
3	(Japan) (Indonesia)	Sayaka Takahashi; Ruselli Hartawan	21; 13	21; 14
4	(Japan) (Indonesia)	Nami Matsuyama / Chiharu Shida; Siti Fadia Silva Ramadhanti / Ribka Sugiarto				not played
5	(Japan) (Indonesia)	Riko Gunji; Putri Kusuma Wardani				not played

==== Chinese Taipei vs Malaysia ====
Chinese Taipei
1
Rizal Memorial Coliseum, Court 2
14 February 2020, 10:10

Malaysia
3

			1	2	3
1	(Chinese Taipei) (Malaysia)	Pai Yu-po; Soniia Cheah Su Ya	14; 21	21; 17	20; 22
2	(Chinese Taipei) (Malaysia)	Hsu Ya-ching / Hu Ling-fang; Chow Mei Kuan / Lee Meng Yean	21; 14	21; 14
3	(Chinese Taipei) (Malaysia)	Chiang Ying-li; Goh Jin Wei	23; 21	8; 21	12; 21
4	(Chinese Taipei) (Malaysia)	Cheng Chi-ya / Liu Chiao-yun; Pearly Tan / Thinaah Muralitharan	21; 18	17; 21	18; 21
5	(Chinese Taipei) (Malaysia)	Hung Yi-ting; Kisona Selvaduray				not played

==== Kazakhstan vs Thailand ====
Kazakhstan
0
Rizal Memorial Coliseum, Court 3
14 February 2020, 10:10

Thailand
3

			1	2	3
1	(Kazakhstan) (Thailand)	Kamila Smagulova; Busanan Ongbamrungphan	3; 21	4; 21
2	(Kazakhstan) (Thailand)	Arina Sazonova; Pornpawee Chochuwong	1; 21	7; 21
3	(Kazakhstan) (Thailand)	Oxsana Shtelle; Phittayaporn Chaiwan	6; 21	5; 21
4	(Kazakhstan) (Thailand)	Arina Sazonova / Aisha Zhumabek; Chayanit Chaladchalam / Phataimas Muenwong				not played
5	(Kazakhstan) (Thailand)	Oxsana Shtelle / Kamila Smagulova; Jongkolphan Kititharakul / Rawinda Prajongjai				not played

==== Singapore vs South Korea ====
Singapore
0
Rizal Memorial Coliseum, Court 4
14 February 2020, 10:10

South Korea
3

			1	2	3
1	(Singapore) (South Korea)	Yeo Jia Min; An Se-young	21; 15	13; 21	16; 21
2	(Singapore) (South Korea)	Jaslyn Hooi; Sung Ji-hyun	15; 21	12; 21
3	(Singapore) (South Korea)	Grace Chua; Kim Ga-eun	10; 21	10; 21
4	(Singapore) (South Korea)	Jin Yujia / Crystal Wong; Lee So-hee / Shin Seung-chan				not played
5	(Singapore) (South Korea)	Grace Chua / Yeo Jia Min; Chang Ye-na / Kim Hye-rin				not played

=== Semi-finals ===
==== Japan vs Malaysia ====
Japan
3
Rizal Memorial Coliseum, Court 1
15 February 2020, 10:00

Malaysia
0

			1	2	3
1	(Japan) (Malaysia)	Akane Yamaguchi; Soniia Cheah Su Ya	21; 17	21; 18
2	(Japan) (Malaysia)	Yuki Fukushima / Sayaka Hirota; Lee Meng Yean / Yap Cheng Wen	21; 11	21; 4
3	(Japan) (Malaysia)	Sayaka Takahashi; Kisona Selvaduray	21; 13	21; 13
4	(Japan) (Malaysia)	Nami Matsuyama / Chiharu Shida; Pearly Tan / Thinaah Muralitharan				not played
5	(Japan) (Malaysia)	Riko Gunji; Eoon Qi Xuan				not played

==== Thailand vs South Korea ====
Thailand
1
Rizal Memorial Coliseum, Court 2
15 February 2020, 10:10

South Korea
3

			1	2	3
1	(Thailand) (South Korea)	Busanan Ongbamrungphan; An Se-young	22; 24	17; 21
2	(Thailand) (South Korea)	Jongkolphan Kititharakul / Rawinda Prajongjai; Lee So-hee / Shin Seung-chan	21; 12	19; 21	11; 21
3	(Thailand) (South Korea)	Pornpawee Chochuwong; Sung Ji-hyun	18; 21	21; 18	23; 21
4	(Thailand) (South Korea)	Chayanit Chaladchalam / Phataimas Muenwong; Kim So-yeong / Kong Hee-yong	20; 22	22; 20	13; 21
5	(Thailand) (South Korea)	Phittayaporn Chaiwan; Kim Ga-eun				not played

=== Final ===
==== Japan vs South Korea ====
Japan
3
Rizal Memorial Coliseum, Court 1
16 February 2020, 10:00

South Korea
0

			1	2	3
1	(Japan) (South Korea)	Akane Yamaguchi; An Se-young	21; 18	19; 21	23; 21
2	(Japan) (South Korea)	Yuki Fukushima / Sayaka Hirota; Lee So-hee / Shin Seung-chan	21; 16	21; 16
3	(Japan) (South Korea)	Sayaka Takahashi; Sung Ji-hyun	21; 16	21; 12
4	(Japan) (South Korea)	Nami Matsuyama / Chiharu Shida; Kim So-yeong / Kong Hee-yong				not played
5	(Japan) (South Korea)	Aya Ohori; Kim Ga-eun				not played

== Final ranking ==
Pos	Team	Pld	W	L	Pts	MD	GD	PD	Final result
1st place, gold medalist(s)	Japan	4	4	0	4	+10	+9	+139	Champions
2nd place, silver medalist(s)	South Korea	4	3	1	3	+7	+13	+195	Runners-up
3rd place, bronze medalist(s)	Thailand	4	3	1	3	+7	+13	+175	Eliminated in semi-finals
3rd place, bronze medalist(s)	Malaysia	3	1	2	1	−2	−7	−56	Eliminated in semi-finals
5	Indonesia	3	1	2	1	+1	+3	+44	Eliminated in quarter-finals
6	Chinese Taipei	3	1	1	1	−1	+1	−2	Eliminated in quarter-finals
7	Singapore	3	0	2	0	−4	−7	−57	Eliminated in quarter-finals
8	Kazakhstan	3	0	2	0	−8	−16	−263	Eliminated in quarter-finals
9	Philippines	2	0	2	0	−10	−19	−175	Eliminated in group stage
