= 2020 Uber Cup qualification =

Tournament details
- Dates: February 10, 2020 – February 16, 2020
- Venue: BA: Rizal Memorial Coliseum; BCA: Cairo Stadium Indoor Halls Complex; BE: Stade Couvert Régional; BO: Ken Kay Badminton Stadium; BPA: Centro Pan-Americano de Judô
- Location: BA: Manila, Philippines; BCA: Cairo, Egypt; BE: Liévin, France; BO: Ballarat, Australia; BPA: Salvador, Bahia, Brazil

The 2020 Uber Cup qualification process is a series of tournaments organised by the five BWF confederations to decide 14 of the 16 teams which will play in the 2020 Uber Cup, with Denmark qualifying automatically as hosts, and Japan qualifying automatically as trophy holder.

== Qualified teams ==
| Country | Confederation | Qualified as | Qualified on | World Team Rankings | Final appearance |
|---|---|---|---|---|---|
| Denmark | Badminton Europe | Host country | 29 November 2018 | 8th | 21st |
| Japan | Badminton Asia | 2018 Uber Cup winners | 27 May 2018 | 1st | 25th |
| Egypt | Badminton Africa | 2020 All Africa Team Championships winner | 12 February 2020 | 25th | Debut |
| Malaysia | Badminton Asia | 2020 Asia Team Championships semifinalists | 14 February 2020 | 9th | 13th |
| South Korea | Badminton Asia | 2020 Asia Team Championships semifinalists | 14 February 2020 | 3rd | 19th |
| Thailand | Badminton Asia | 2020 Asia Team Championships semifinalists | 14 February 2020 | 4th | 7th |
| France | Badminton Europe | 2020 European Team Championships semifinalists | 14 February 2020 | 13th | 2nd |
| Germany | Badminton Europe | 2020 European Team Championships semifinalists | 14 February 2020 | 15th | 10th |
| Scotland | Badminton Europe | 2020 European Team Championships semifinalists | 14 February 2020 | 29th | Debut |
| Tahiti | Badminton Oceania | 2020 Oceania Team Championships semifinalists^{4} | 18 February 2020 | 92nd | Debut |
| Canada | Badminton Pan Am | 2020 Pan Am Team Championships winner | 16 February 2020 | 10th | 12th |
| China | Badminton Asia | Best ranking (Asia)^{1} | 18 February 2020 | 2nd | 19th |
| Spain | Badminton Europe | Best ranking (Europe)^{3} | 18 February 2020 | 23rd | 2nd |
| Indonesia | Badminton Asia | Best ranking (overall) | 18 February 2020 | 5th | 25th |
| Chinese Taipei | Badminton Asia | Best ranking (overall) | 18 February 2020 | 6th | 7th |
| India | Badminton Asia | Best ranking (overall) | 18 February 2020 | 7th | 7th |
Withdrew
| Russia | Badminton Europe | Best ranking (Europe)^{2} | 18 February 2020 | 12th | —N/a |
| Australia | Badminton Oceania | 2020 Oceania Team Championships winners | 15 February 2020 | 21st | —N/a |

- ^1 Since Japan, one of the semifinalists for Asian qualification tournament had already qualified as title holder, hence the spot is given to the best Asian team from World Team Ranking
- ^2 Since Denmark, one of the semifinalists for European qualification tournament had already qualified as the host, hence the spot is given to the best European team from World Team Ranking
- ^3 Russia withdrew and replaced by Spain as the next highest ranked team
- ^4 Australia as winner of the BO 2020 championships withdrew and replaced by Tahiti as the next highest ranked team because New Zealand and New Caledonia as the next highest ranked team declined the offer

== Qualification process ==
The number of teams participating in the final tournament is 16. The allocation of slots for each confederation is the same allocation from 2016 tournament; 4 from each Asia and Europe, and 1 from each Africa, Oceania and Pan Am. Two automatic qualifiers are the host and defending champion. The remaining quota will be filled by World Team Ranking.

== Confederation qualification ==
=== Badminton Confederation of Africa ===
The qualification for the African teams was held from 10 to 13 February 2020, at the Cairo Stadium Indoor Halls Complex in Cairo, Egypt. The winners of the African qualification will qualified for the Uber Cup.

==== Teams in contention ====
Teams qualified for the Group stage

- Algeria
- Egypt
- Mauritius
- South Africa

==== Round-robin ====
| Pos | Team | Pld | W | L | MF | MA | MD | GF | GA | GD | PF | PA | PD | Pts | Qualification |
|---|---|---|---|---|---|---|---|---|---|---|---|---|---|---|---|
| 1 | Egypt | 3 | 3 | 0 | 10 | 5 | +5 | 20 | 11 | +9 | 638 | 539 | +99 | 3 | Uber Cup |
| 2 | Algeria | 3 | 2 | 1 | 10 | 5 | +5 | 20 | 11 | +9 | 563 | 522 | +41 | 2 | |
| 3 | Mauritius | 3 | 1 | 2 | 8 | 7 | +1 | 17 | 16 | +1 | 573 | 565 | +8 | 1 | |
| 4 | South Africa | 3 | 0 | 3 | 2 | 13 | −11 | 8 | 27 | −19 | 551 | 699 | −148 | 0 | |

Source: TS

=== Badminton Asia ===
The qualification for the Asian teams will held from 11 to 16 February 2020, at the Rizal Memorial Coliseum in Manila, Philippines. The semifinalist of the Asian qualification will qualified for the Uber Cup. Japan qualified automatically as trophy holder.

==== Teams in contention ====
Teams qualified for the Group stage

- Chinese Taipei
- Indonesia
- Japan (qualified)
- Kazakhstan
- Malaysia
- Philippines
- Singapore
- Thailand
- South Korea

==== First round (group stage) ====
Advance to Knockout stage

Group W
Group X

| Pos | Team | Pld | Pts |
|---|---|---|---|
| 1 | Japan | 1 | 1 |
| 2 | Malaysia | 1 | 0 |

Source: TS

| Pos | Team | Pld | Pts |
|---|---|---|---|
| 1 | South Korea | 1 | 1 |
| 2 | Kazakhstan | 1 | 0 |

Source: TS
Group Y
Group Z

| Pos | Team | Pld | Pts |
|---|---|---|---|
| 1 | Thailand | 2 | 2 |
| 2 | Indonesia | 2 | 1 |
| 3 | Philippines | 2 | 0 |

Source: TS

| Pos | Team | Pld | Pts |
|---|---|---|---|
| 1 | Chinese Taipei | 1 | 1 |
| 2 | Singapore | 1 | 0 |

Source: TS

==== Second round (knockout stage) ====
Quarter-finals
14 February 10:00
Japan (1) | 3
Indonesia (5) | 0
14 February 10:10
Chinese Taipei (6) | 1
Malaysia (8) | 3
14 February 10:10
Kazakhstan | 0
Thailand (4) | 3
14 February 10:10
Singapore | 0
South Korea (3) | 3

Semi-finals
15 February 10:00
Japan (1) | 3
Malaysia (8) | 0
15 February 10:00
Thailand (4) | 1
South Korea (3) | 3

Final
16 February 10:00
Japan (1) | 3
South Korea | 0

=== Badminton Europe ===
The qualification for the European teams will held from 11 to 16 February 2020, at the Stade Couvert Régional in Liévin, France. The semi-finalist of the European qualification will qualified for the Thomas Cup. Denmark qualified automatically as hosts.

==== Teams in contention ====
Teams qualified for the Group stage

- Belarus
- Belgium
- Bulgaria
- Czech Republic
- Denmark (qualified)
- England
- Estonia
- Finland
- France
- Germany
- Hungary
- Iceland
- Ireland
- Israel
- Latvia
- Lithuania
- Netherlands
- Norway
- Poland
- Portugal
- Russia
- Scotland
- Slovakia
- Slovenia
- Sweden
- Spain
- Turkey
- Ukraine
- Wales

==== First round (group stage) ====
Advance to Knockout stage

Group 1
Group 2
Group 3

| Pos | Team | Pld | Pts |
|---|---|---|---|
| 1 | Denmark | 3 | 3 |
| 2 | Estonia | 3 | 2 |
| 3 | Netherlands | 3 | 1 |
| 4 | Ireland | 3 | 0 |

Source: TS

| Pos | Team | Pld | Pts |
|---|---|---|---|
| 1 | Russia | 3 | 3 |
| 2 | Belgium | 3 | 2 |
| 3 | Lithuania | 3 | 1 |
| 4 | Iceland | 3 | 0 |

Source: TS

| Pos | Team | Pld | Pts |
|---|---|---|---|
| 1 | France (H) | 3 | 3 |
| 2 | England | 3 | 2 |
| 3 | Belarus | 3 | 1 |
| 4 | Israel | 3 | 0 |

Source: TS
(H) Host
Group 4
Group 5
Group 6

| Pos | Team | Pld | Pts |
|---|---|---|---|
| 1 | Germany | 3 | 3 |
| 2 | Slovakia | 3 | 2 |
| 3 | Latvia | 3 | 1 |
| 4 | Portugal | 3 | 0 |

Source: TS

| Pos | Team | Pld | Pts |
|---|---|---|---|
| 1 | Hungary | 3 | 3 |
| 2 | Bulgaria | 3 | 2 |
| 3 | Ukraine | 3 | 1 |
| 4 | Wales | 3 | 0 |

Source: TS

| Pos | Team | Pld | Pts |
|---|---|---|---|
| 1 | Turkey | 3 | 3 |
| 2 | Czech Republic | 3 | 2 |
| 3 | Slovenia | 3 | 1 |
| 4 | Finland | 3 | 0 |

Source: TS
Group 7

| Pos | Team | Pld | Pts |
|---|---|---|---|
| 1 | Sweden | 4 | 4 |
| 2 | Scotland | 4 | 3 |
| 3 | Poland | 4 | 1 |
| 4 | Spain | 4 | 1 |
| 5 | Norway | 4 | 1 |

Source: TS

Ranking of runners-up

Due to group 7 having different number of teams, the results against the fifth-placed teams are not considered for this ranking.

| Pos | Grp | Team | Pld | W | L | MF | MA | MD | GF | GA | GD | PF | PA | PD | Pts | Qualification |
|---|---|---|---|---|---|---|---|---|---|---|---|---|---|---|---|---|
| 1 | 7 | Scotland | 3 | 2 | 1 | 11 | 4 | +7 | 23 | 8 | +15 | 592 | 412 | +180 | 2 | Knockout stage |
| 2 | 3 | England | 3 | 2 | 1 | 10 | 5 | +5 | 21 | 13 | +8 | 638 | 543 | +95 | 2 | |
| 3 | 5 | Bulgaria | 3 | 2 | 1 | 9 | 6 | +3 | 21 | 14 | +7 | 651 | 559 | +92 | 2 | |
| 4 | 6 | Czech Republic | 3 | 2 | 1 | 9 | 6 | +3 | 19 | 12 | +7 | 562 | 543 | +19 | 2 | |
| 5 | 2 | Belgium | 3 | 2 | 1 | 9 | 6 | +3 | 20 | 14 | +6 | 637 | 537 | +100 | 2 | |
| 6 | 4 | Slovakia | 3 | 2 | 1 | 8 | 7 | +1 | 16 | 15 | +1 | 530 | 520 | +10 | 2 | |
| 7 | 1 | Estonia | 3 | 2 | 1 | 7 | 8 | −1 | 14 | 17 | −3 | 495 | 586 | −91 | 2 | |

==== Second round (knockout stage) ====
Quarter-finals
14 February 2020
Denmark | 3
Turkey | 0
14 February 2020
France | 3
Sweden | 1
14 February 2020
Hungary | 0
Germany | 3
14 February 2020
Scotland | 3
Russia | 0

Semi-finals
15 February 2020
Denmark | 3
France | 1
15 February 2020
Germany | 3
Scotland | 1

Final
16 February 2020
Denmark | 3
Germany | 1

=== Badminton Oceania ===
The qualification for the Oceanian teams will hold from 13 to 15 February 2020, at the Ken Kay Badminton Stadium in Ballarat, Australia. The winner of the Oceania qualification qualified for the Uber Cup.

==== Teams in contention ====
- Australia
- New Caledonia
- New Zealand
- Tahiti

==== Round-robin ====
| Pos | Team | Pld | W | L | MF | MA | MD | GF | GA | GD | PF | PA | PD | Pts | Qualification |
|---|---|---|---|---|---|---|---|---|---|---|---|---|---|---|---|
| 1 | Australia | 3 | 3 | 0 | 14 | 1 | +13 | 28 | 3 | +25 | 651 | 319 | +332 | 3 | Uber Cup |
| 2 | New Zealand | 3 | 2 | 1 | 11 | 4 | +7 | 23 | 8 | +15 | 625 | 400 | +225 | 2 | |
| 3 | New Caledonia | 3 | 1 | 2 | 5 | 10 | −5 | 10 | 21 | −11 | 377 | 592 | −215 | 1 | |
| 4 | Tahiti | 3 | 0 | 3 | 0 | 15 | −15 | 1 | 30 | −29 | 304 | 646 | −342 | 0 | |

Source: TS

=== Badminton Pan Am ===
The qualification for the Pan Am teams will hold from 13 to 16 February 2020, at the Centro Pan-Americano de Judô in Salvador, Bahia, Brazil. The winner of the Pan Am qualification will qualified for the Uber Cup.

==== Teams in contention ====
Teams qualified for the Group stage

- Brazil
- Canada
- Falkland Islands
- Guatemala
- Mexico
- Peru
- United States

==== First round (group stage) ====
Advance to Knockout stage

Group A

| Pos | Team | Pld | Pts |
|---|---|---|---|
| 1 | Canada | 2 | 2 |
| 2 | Mexico | 2 | 1 |
| 3 | Guatemala | 2 | 0 |

Source: TS
Group B

| Pos | Team | Pld | Pts |
|---|---|---|---|
| 1 | United States | 3 | 2 |
| 2 | Brazil | 3 | 2 |
| 3 | Peru | 3 | 2 |
| 4 | Falkland Islands | 3 | 0 |

Source: TS

==== Second round (knockout stage) ====
Semi-finals
15 February
Canada | 3
Brazil | 0
15 February
Mexico | 0
United States | 3

Final
16 February
Canada | 3
United States | 0
Third place
15 February
Brazil | 3
Mexico | 2

== World team rankings ==
=== Summary of qualification ===
Below is the chart of the BWF World Team Ranking calculated by adding World Ranking points of top three Women's Singles players and top two Women's Doubles pairs on 18 February 2020.

| Rank | Conf. | Nation | Points | Continental results | Qualification status |
|---|---|---|---|---|---|
| 1 | BA | Japan | 416,261 | Winner | Qualified as trophy holder |
| 2 | BA | China | 393,284 | | Qualified by ranking (Asia) |
| 3 | BA | South Korea | 328,374 | Runner-up | Qualified as BA semifinalists |
| 4 | BA | Thailand | 280,952 | Semifinals | Qualified as BA semifinalists |
| 5 | BA | Indonesia | 230,502 | Quarterfinals | Qualified by ranking (overall) |
| 6 | BA | Chinese Taipei | 227,037 | Quarterfinals | Qualified by ranking (overall) |
| 7 | BA | India | 207,820 | | Qualified by ranking (overall) |
| 8 | BE | Denmark | 194,994 | Winner | Qualified as host country |
| 9 | BA | Malaysia | 165,815 | Semifinals | Qualified as BA semifinalists |
| 10 | BPA | Canada | 157,851 | Winner | Qualified as the winner of BPA |
| 11 | BA | Hong Kong | 149,508 | | |
| 12 | BE | Russia | 140,678 | Quarterfinals | Qualified as BE semifinalists, Withdrew |
| 13 | BE | France | 137,316 | Semifinals | Qualified as BE semifinalists |
| 14 | BPA | United States | 131,429 | Runner-up | |
| 15 | BE | Germany | 118,358 | Runner-up | Qualified as BE semifinalists |
| 16 | BE | Turkey | 110,789 | Quarterfinals | |
| 17 | BE | Spain | 108,222 | Group stage | Qualified by ranking (Europe) |
| 18 | BE | Bulgaria | 105,505 | Group stage | |
| 19 | BE | England | 105,175 | Group stage | |
| 20 | BE | Netherlands | 99,479 | Group stage | |
| 21 | BO | Australia | 94,012 | Winner | Qualified as the winner of BO, Withdrew |
| 22 | BA | Singapore | 91,611 | Quarterfinals | |
| 23 | BPA | Brazil | 83,115 | 3rd place | |
| 24 | BE | Sweden | 77,742 | Quarterfinals | |
| 25 | BCA | Egypt | 75,698 | Winner | Qualified as the winner of BCA |
| 26 | BPA | Peru | 72,949 | 5th place | |
| 27 | BE | Switzerland | 68,397 | | |
| 28 | BE | Ukraine | 67,456 | Group stage | |
| 29 | BE | Scotland | 67,077 | Semifinals | Qualified as BE semifinalists |
| 30 | BA | Vietnam | 66,601 | | |
| 31 | BE | Hungary | 65,457 | Quarterfinals | |
| 32 | BE | Estonia | 57,371 | Group stage | |
| 33 | BPA | Guatemala | 56,809 | 6th place | |
| 34 | BE | Czech Republic | 51,793 | Group stage | |
| 35 | BCA | Nigeria | 50,663 | | |
| 36 | BPA | Mexico | 50,537 | 4th place | |
| 37 | BE | Belgium | 47,453 | Group stage | |
| 38 | BA | Iran | 40,470 | | |
| 39 | BCA | Mauritius | 34,758 | 3rd place | |
| 40 | BE | Finland | 31,062 | Group stage | |
| 41 | BE | Poland | 31,007 | Group stage | |
| 42 | BCA | Algeria | 30,863 | Runner-up | |
| 43 | BE | Belarus | 29,363 | Group stage | |
| 44 | BE | Israel | 29,351 | Group stage | |
| 45 | BA | Myanmar | 29,110 | | |
| 46 | BO | New Zealand | 28,493 | Runner-up | Qualified as runners up of BO, Declined the offer |
| 47 | BA | Maldives | 28,100 | | |
| 48 | BPA | Dominican Republic | 27,420 | | |
| 49 | BCA | South Africa | 26,060 | 4th place | |
| 50 | BE | Portugal | 25,675 | Group stage | |
50+ participants
| 53 | BE | Slovenia | 23,407 | Group stage | |
| 54 | BE | Ireland | 23,280 | Group stage | |
| 55 | BE | Slovakia | 23,207 | Group stage | |
| 58 | BE | Wales | 21,764 | Group stage | |
| 61 | BE | Norway | 17,658 | Group stage | |
| 62 | BE | Lithuania | 17,024 | Group stage | |
| 67 | BE | Latvia | 14,615 | Group stage | |
| 74 | BA | Philippines | 10,166 | Group stage | |
| 77 | BA | Kazakhstan | 9,093 | Quarterfinals | |
| 81 | BO | New Caledonia | 6,927 | 3rd place | Qualified as BO semifinalists, Declined the offer |
| 89 | BE | Iceland | 5,775 | Group stage | |
| 92 | BO | Tahiti | 4,863 | 4th place | Qualified as BO semifinalists |
| – | BPA | Falkland Islands | – | 7th place | |
