= 2015 BWF World Junior Championships – Girls singles =

2015 BWF World Junior Championships – Girls' Singles
Tournament details
- Dates: 10 November 2015 – 15 November 2015
- Edition: 17th
- Level: International
- Venue: National Sports Village
- Location: Lima

The Girls' Singles tournament of the 2015 BWF World Junior Championships is held on November 10–15. The defending champion of the last edition is Akane Yamaguchi from Japan.

== Seeded ==
1. (China) He Bingjiao (Quarterfinals)
2. (Japan) Saena Kawakami (4th round)
3. (Thailand) Supanida Katethong (2nd round)
4. (Malaysia) Goh Jin Wei (Champion)
5. (Thailand) Pornpawee Chochuwong (4th round)
6. (Indonesia) Gregoria Mariska Tunjung (4th round)
7. (India) Ruthvika Shivani Gadde (4th round)
8. (Denmark) Julie Dawall Jakobsen (Quarterfinals)
9. (Spain) Clara Azurmendi (4th round)
10. (Turkey) Aliye Demirbag (3rd round)
11. (Japan) Natsuki Nidaira (Semifinals)
12. (Turkey) Kader İnal (1st round)
13. (China) Chen Yufei (Quarterfinals)
14. (Denmark) Mia Blichfeldt (4th round)
15. (Australia) Joy Lai (3rd round)
16. (Peru) Daniela Macias (2nd round)

== Draw ==
=== Finals ===
Quarterfinals
1 | (China) He Bingjiao | 21 | 13 | 19
11 | (Japan) Natsuki Nidaira | 12 | 21 | 21
(Malaysia) Lee Ying Ying | 19 | 21 | 21
8 | (Denmark) Julie Dawall Jakobsen | 21 | 13 | 10
13 | (China) Chen Yufei | 19 | 20
4 | (Malaysia) Goh Jin Wei | 21 | 22
(China) Gao Fangjie | 16 | 18
(Japan) Moe Araki | 21 | 21

Semifinals
11 | (Japan) Natsuki Nidaira | 15 | 21 | 14
(Malaysia) Lee Ying Ying | 21 | 16 | 21
4 | (Malaysia) Goh Jin Wei | 21 | 21
(Japan) Moe Araki | 10 | 10

Final
(Malaysia) Lee Ying Ying | 15 | 16
4 | (Malaysia) Goh Jin Wei | 21 | 21

=== Top half ===
==== Section 1 ====
First round
(Cuba) A Artiz | 7 | 4
(Canada) Q Ouyang | 21 | 21
(Thailand) P Chaiwan | 21 | 21
(Slovenia) E Cizelj | 14 | 13
(South Africa) L Schoeman | 7 | 11
(Estonia) K Kuuba | 21 | 21
(Croatia) K Galenic | 21 | 21
(Chile) P Pontigo | 4 | 2
(Netherlands) D Jille | 21 | 21
(Guatemala) A J Paiz | 6 | 6
(South Korea) Lee Y-r | 21 | 21
(Malaysia) Ng Q X | 6 | 12

Second round
1 | (China) He BJ | 21 | 21
(Canada) Q Ouyang | 19 | 19
(Thailand) P Chaiwan | 21 | 21
(Estonia) K Kuuba | 10 | 13
15 | (Australia) J Lai | 21 | 21
(Croatia) K Galenic | 8 | 10
(Netherlands) D Jille | 10 | 13
(South Korea) Lee Y-r | 21 | 21

Third round
1 | (China) He BJ | 21 | 18 | 21
(Thailand) P Chaiwan | 14 | 21 | 8
15 | (Australia) J Lai | 11 | 21 | 9
(South Korea) Lee Y-r | 21 | 15 | 21

Fourth round
1 | (China) He BJ | 21 | 21
(South Korea) Lee Y-r | 15 | 17

==== Section 2 ====
First round
(Indonesia) D Y Indah Sari | 21 | 21
(Singapore) D Quek | 12 | 10
(Colombia) B Gil | 4 | 6
(Hong Kong) Yeung S Y | 21 | 21
(Dominican Republic) N A Jimenez | 4 | 8
(South Korea) Park G-e | 21 | 21
(Turkey) B Ceylan | 7 | 8
(Japan) S Saito | 21 | 21
(Germany) Y Li | 21 | 21
(South Africa) L Maharaj | 10 | 10
(Mexico) A P de la Torre | 21 | 21
(Venezuela) T Sánchez | 13 | 11

Second round
7 | (India) R S Gadde | 21 | 21
(Indonesia) D Y Indah Sari | 14 | 12
(Hong Kong) Yeung S Y | 11 | 14
(South Korea) Park G-e | 21 | 21
11 | (Japan) N Nidaira | 22 | 21 | 21
(Japan) S Saito | 24 | 12 | 14
(Germany) Y Li | 21 | 22
(Mexico) A P de la Torre | 15 | 20

Third round
7 | (India) R S Gadde | 21 | 21
(South Korea) Park G-e | 17 | 12
11 | (Japan) N Nidaira | 21 | 21
(Germany) Y Li | 10 | 11

Fourth round
7 | (India) R S Gadde | 21 | 11 | 10
11 | (Japan) N Nidaira | 13 | 21 | 21

==== Section 3 ====
First round
(Hungary) V Sandorhazi | 10 | 13
(Malaysia) Lee Y Y | 21 | 21
(France) Y Hoyaux | 21 | 21
(Slovenia) P Polanc | 13 | 10
(Sweden) E Karlsson | 21 | 21 | 21
(Macau) Gong X X | 14 | 23 | 9
(Chile) A Montero
(Singapore) Yeo J M | w | / | o
(Mexico) A I Valero | 21 | 21
(Costa Rica) A L Martinez | 8 | 2
(United States) V Chen | 21 | 21
(Italy) G Fiorito | 12 | 6

Second round
3 | (Thailand) S Katethong | 21 | 14 | 13
(Malaysia) Lee Y Y | 18 | 21 | 21
(France) Y Hoyaux | 15 | 21 | 21
(Sweden) E Karlsson | 21 | 18 | 12
9 | (Spain) C Azurmendi | 21 | 21
(Chile) A Montero | 4 | 1
(Mexico) A I Valero | 7 | 15
(United States) V Chen | 21 | 21

Third round
(Malaysia) Lee Y Y | 21 | 21
(France) Y Hoyaux | 13 | 9
9 | (Spain) C Azurmendi | 21 | 21
(United States) V Chen | 18 | 18

Fourth round
(Malaysia) Lee Y Y | 21 | 21
9 | (Spain) C Azurmendi | 16 | 11

==== Section 4 ====
First round
(Macau) Zou Z L | 9 | 5
(Malaysia) T Muralitharan | 21 | 21
(Canada) C Rowe | 15 | 21 | 21
(Peru) P La Torre | 21 | 18 | 13
(Australia) T Ho | 21 | 21
(Guyana) P Ramdhani | 8 | 3
12 | (Turkey) K İnal | 16 | 11
(South Korea) Baek H-n | 21 | 21
(China) Li Y | 21 | 21
(United States) J Hsu | 5 | 11
(New Zealand) C Zhang | 22 | 21
(Iceland) A K Jonsdottir | 20 | 19
(El Salvador) M Hernandez | 6 | 8
(Chinese Taipei) Sung S-y | 21 | 21

Second round
8 | (Denmark) J D Jakobsen | 21 | 21
(Malaysia) T Muralitharan | 18 | 18
(Canada) C Rowe | 15 | 9
(Australia) T Ho | 21 | 21
(South Korea) Baek H-n | 11 | 22 | 8
(China) Li Y | 21 | 20 | 21
(New Zealand) C Zhang | 9 | 14
(Chinese Taipei) Sung S-y | 21 | 21

Third round
8 | (Denmark) J D Jakobsen | 21 | 21
(Australia) T Ho | 15 | 17
(China) Li Y | 21 | 21
(Chinese Taipei) Sung S-y | 11 | 16

Fourth round
8 | (Denmark) J D Jakobsen | w | / | o
(China) Li Y

=== Bottom half ===
==== Section 5 ====
First round
(Iceland) A K Johannsdottir | 12 | 11
(Switzerland) R Stern | 21 | 21
(Sweden) J Magnusson | 21 | 11 | 8
(Thailand) C Jucharoen | 14 | 21 | 21
(Cuba) M Azcuy | 9 | 11
(Germany) A Schreiber | 21 | 21
(Chinese Taipei) Hsu W-c | 11 | 10
13 | (China) Chen YF | 21 | 21
(Australia) A Wu | 21 | 21
(New Zealand) S Fu | 14 | 8
(Costa Rica) L Villalobos | 21 | 25
(Guatemala) A Samayoa | 15 | 23
(El Salvador) F Centeno | 8 | 4
(India) V Gummadi | 21 | 21

Second round
(Switzerland) R Stern | 13 | 7
(Thailand) C Jucharoen | 21 | 21
(Germany) A Schreiber | 7 | 15
13 | (China) Chen YF | 21 | 21
(Australia) A Wu | 21 | 21
(Costa Rica) L Villalobos | 12 | 9
(India) V Gummadi | 16 | 17
5 | (Thailand) P Chochuwong | 21 | 21

Third round
(Thailand) C Jucharoen | 12 | 11
13 | (China) Chen YF | 21 | 21
(Australia) A Wu | 18 | 10
5 | (Thailand) P Chochuwong | 21 | 21

Fourth round
13 | (China) Chen YF | 21 | 21
5 | (Thailand) P Chochuwong | 14 | 18

==== Section 6 ====
First round
(New Zealand) D Yin | 21 | 21
(Mexico) M Soto | 9 | 13
(Indonesia) J F Sugiarto | 21 | 21
(Netherlands) M Baan | 10 | 12
(Chile) L Pontigo | 4 | 3
(Singapore) Ong R-n | 21 | 21
(France) M Lambert | 21 | 21
(Barbados) A Haywood | 10 | 9
(South Korea) Shim Y-r | 21 | 21
(Colombia) T Caicedo | 0 | 5
(Denmark) M Skødstrup | 21 | 21
(Venezuela) D M Ortiz | 6 | 11

Second round
(New Zealand) D Yin | 10 | 8
(Indonesia) J F Sugiarto | 21 | 21
(Singapore) Ong R-n | 12 | 17
14 | (Denmark) M Blichfeldt | 21 | 21
(France) M Lambert | 18 | 10
(South Korea) Shim Y-r | 21 | 21
(Denmark) M Skødstrup | 6 | 6
4 | (Malaysia) Goh J W | 21 | 21

Third round
(Indonesia) J F Sugiarto | 10 | 21 | 15
14 | (Denmark) M Blichfeldt | 21 | 15 | 21
(South Korea) Shim Y-r | 5 | 9
4 | (Malaysia) Goh J W | 21 | 21

Fourth round
14 | (Denmark) M Blichfeldt
4 | (Malaysia) Goh J W | w | / | o

==== Section 7 ====
First round
(China) Gao FJ | 21 | 21
(Hong Kong) Fan K Y | 13 | 8
(Slovenia) N Arih | 14 | 21 | 21
(Spain) S Penalver | 21 | 14 | 14
(Hungary) R Madarasz | 21 | 21
(Argentina) F Bernatene | 7 | 5
(South Africa) J Scholtz | 21 | 21
(Jamaica) E C Reynolds | 10 | 15
(Chinese Taipei) Lee C-h | 21 | 21
(Italy) M Punter | 6 | 5
(Sweden) E Svensson | 21 | 21
(Spain) E Murio | 9 | 13

Second round
(China) Gao FJ | 21 | 21
(Slovenia) N Arih | 15 | 11
(Hungary) R Madarasz | 21 | 18
10 | (Turkey) A Demirbag | 23 | 21
(South Africa) J Scholtz | 16 | 19
(Chinese Taipei) Lee C-h | 21 | 21
(Sweden) E Svensson | 8 | 5
6 | (Indonesia) G Mariska | 21 | 21

Third round
(China) Gao FJ | 21 | 21
10 | (Turkey) A Demirbag | 12 | 6
(Chinese Taipei) Lee C-h | 19 | 17
6 | (Indonesia) G Mariska | 21 | 21

Fourth round
(China) Gao FJ | 24 | 26
6 | (Indonesia) G Mariska | 22 | 24

==== Section 8 ====
First round
(Dominican Republic) B A Polanco | 22 | 10
(Peru) F Saponara | 24 | 21
(Japan) M Araki | 21 | 21
(Estonia) H Rüütel | 12 | 14
(India) S Pardeshi | 21 | 15 | 21
(Chinese Taipei) Lai I-t | 15 | 21 | 7
(Guatemala) M Paiz | 6 | 10
(England) Ngan M L | 21 | 21
(Germany) M Wilson | 21 | 20 | 21
(Italy) S Garino | 15 | 22 | 18
(United States) C Pan | 21 | 21
(Canada) K Cheng | 13 | 16

Second round
(Peru) F Saponara | 10 | 8
(Japan) M Araki | 21 | 21
(India) S Pardeshi | 21 | 21
16 | (Peru) D Macias | 12 | 14
(England) Ngan M L | 21 | 21
(Germany) M Wilson | 12 | 10
(United States) C Pan | 19 | 13
2 | (Japan) S Kawakami | 21 | 21

Third round
(Japan) M Araki | 21 | 21
(India) S Pardeshi | 10 | 11
(England) Ngan M L | 6 | 12
2 | (Japan) S Kawakami | 21 | 21

Fourth round
(Japan) M Araki | 21 | 12 | 21
2 | (Japan) S Kawakami | 15 | 21 | 19

== Bibliography ==
- Main Draw
