= Natsuki Nidaira =

Japanese badminton player

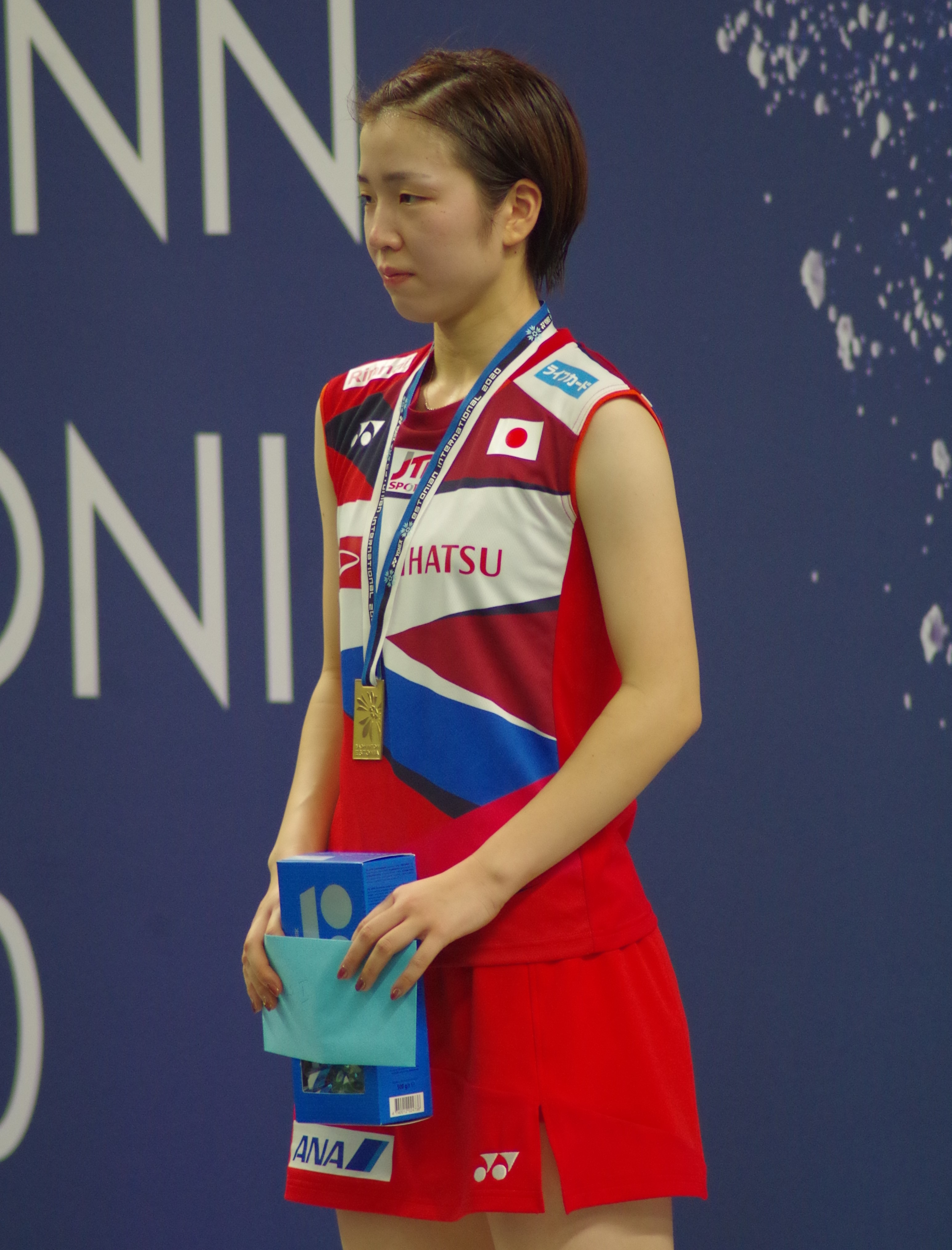
- Nidaira at the 2020 Estonian International

Personal information
- Born: 12 July 1998 (age 28) Mito, Ibaraki, Japan
- Height: 1.64 m (5 ft 5 in)
- Weight: 54 kg (119 lb)

Sport
- Country: Japan
- Sport: Badminton
- Handedness: Right
- Coached by: Shuji Matsuno

Women's singles
- Career record: 205 wins, 96 losses (68.11%)
- Highest ranking: 17 (3 June 2025)
- Current ranking: 36 (17 November 2026)
- BWF profile
Medal record
Women's badminton
Representing Japan
Asian Games
Bronze medal – third place	2022 Hangzhou	Women's team
Asia Team Championships
Bronze medal – third place	2022 Selangor	Women's team
Bronze medal – third place	2024 Selangor	Women's team
World Junior Championships
Bronze medal – third place	2014 Alor Setar	Mixed team
Bronze medal – third place	2015 Lima	Girls' singles
Bronze medal – third place	2016 Bilbao	Mixed team
Asian Junior Championships
Bronze medal – third place	2015 Bangkok	Mixed team
Bronze medal – third place	2016 Bangkok	Mixed team

Natsuki Nidaira (仁平 菜月, Nidaira Natsuki; born 12 July 1998) is a Japanese badminton player who competes in women's singles. She plays for the Yonex badminton team and achieved a career-high world ranking of No. 17. In junior career, Nidaira winning the girls' singles gold medal at the 2013 Asian Junior Championships and a bronze medal at the 2015 World Junior Championships.

She reached her first BWF World Tour final at the 2018 Swiss Open and won her maiden World Tour title at the 2024 U.S. Open (Super 300). She was also part of the Japanese squad that won bronze medals in the women's team events at the 2022 Asian Games and the Asia Team Championships in 2022 and 2024.

== Career ==
Nidaira came from the Mito, Ibaraki, and started playing badminton at aged five. Since the elementary school she has won several national championships, and in 2009, she joined the Japanese junior team. In 2013, she competed at the U-17 Asian Junior Championships, and won the girls' singles gold. After graduating from high school, she joined the Tonami Transportation team. Nidaira was part of the Japanese U-19 team, that won the mixed team bronze medal at the 2014, 2016 World Junior Championships, and in the girls' singles event in 2015. She also won the mixed team bronze at the 2015 and 2016 Asian Junior Championships.

Nidaira made a debut in the senior event in 2015, and at the 2016 Korea Masters, a Grand Prix Gold tournament, she finished in the semifinals round, lose to host player Lee Jang-mi in the straight games. In 2017 she finished as runner-up at the Smiling Fish International in Thailand, and won her first senior international title at the Yonex / K&D Graphics International in the United States.

Nidaira reached her first BWF World Tour final at the 2018 Swiss Open (Super 300), losing to compatriot Sayaka Takahashi. In 2024 she won her maiden World Tour title at the U.S. Open (Super 300), defeating Beiwen Zhang in three games. She attained a career-high world ranking of No. 17 on 3 June 2025.

== Achievements ==
=== World Junior Championships ===
Girls' singles
Year	Venue	Opponent	Score	Result	Ref.
2015	Centro de Alto Rendimiento de la Videna, Lima Peru	(Malaysia) Lee Ying Ying	15–21, 21–16, 14–21	Bronze	

=== BWF World Tour (1 title, 1 runner-up) ===
The BWF World Tour, which was announced on 19 March 2017 and implemented in 2018, is a series of elite badminton tournaments sanctioned by the Badminton World Federation (BWF). The BWF World Tour is divided into levels of World Tour Finals, Super 1000, Super 750, Super 500, Super 300 (part of the HSBC World Tour), and the BWF Tour Super 100.

Women's singles
Year	Tournament	Level	Opponent	Score	Result	Ref.
2018	Swiss Open	Super 300	(Japan) Sayaka Takahashi	12–21, 18–21	(silver) Runner-up	
2024	U.S. Open	Super 300	(United States) Beiwen Zhang	17–21, 21–18, 24–22	(gold) Winner	

=== BWF International Challenge/Series (6 titles, 4 runners-up) ===
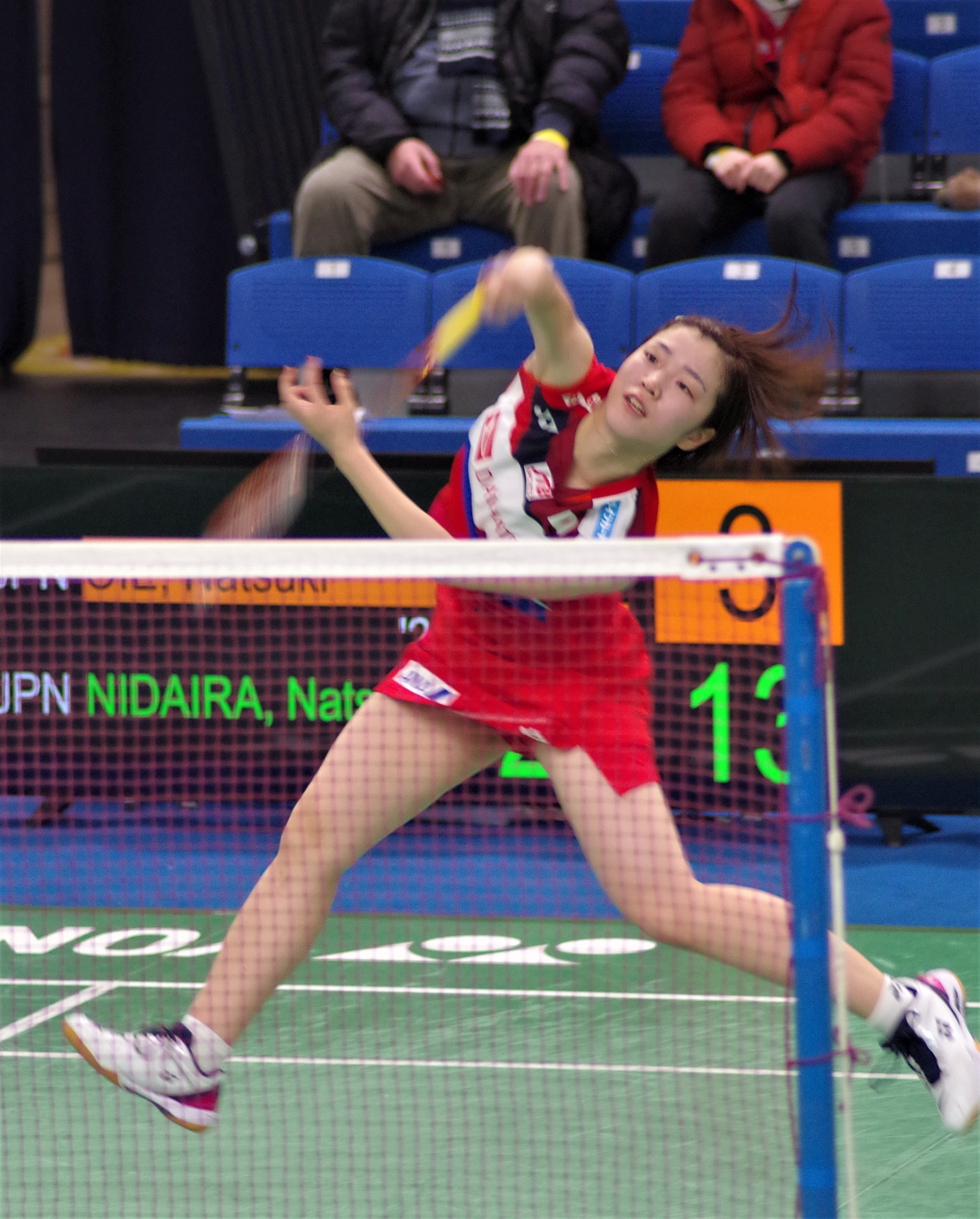
Nidaira at the 2020 Estonian International

Women's singles
Year	Tournament	Opponent	Score	Result	Ref.
2017	Smiling Fish International	(China) Hui Xirui	10–21, 21–15, 19–21	(silver) Runner-up	
2017	Yonex / K&D Graphics International	(Canada) Olivia Lei	21–12, 21–13	(gold) Winner	
2019	Silicon Valley International	(Japan) Mayu Sogo	21–13, 21–12	(gold) Winner	
2019	South Australia International	(Japan) Yukino Nakai	20–22, 21–12, 21–10	(gold) Winner	
2020	Estonian International	(Japan) Natsuki Oie	21–12, 21–5	(gold) Winner	
2020	Swedish Open	(Japan) Natsuki Oie	21–19, 21–8	(gold) Winner	
2022	Mexican International	(Japan) Riko Gunji	14–21, 21–19, 14–21	(silver) Runner-up	
2022	Norwegian International	(Japan) Riko Gunji	14–21, 21–18, 21–16	(gold) Winner	
2022	Irish Open	(Japan) Riko Gunji	13–21, 11–21	(silver) Runner-up	
2022	Canadian International	(Canada) Michelle Li	11–21, 17–21	(silver) Runner-up	

BWF International Challenge tournament
BWF International Series tournament

=== BWF Junior International (4 titles) ===
Girls' singles
Year	Tournament	Opponent	Score	Result	Ref.
2014	Korea Junior International	(Japan) Saena Kawakami	8–21, 21–15, 21–10	(gold) Winner	
2016	Dutch Junior	(South Korea) Kim Ga-eun	21–17, 21–19	(gold) Winner	
2016	German Junior	(Thailand) Pornpawee Chochuwong	21–15, 21–16	(gold) Winner	
2016	India Junior International	(India) Vrushali Gummadi	11–6, 12–10, 9–11, 11–8	(gold) Winner	

BWF Junior International Grand Prix tournament
BWF Junior International Series tournament
