= 2017 Badminton Asia Junior Championships – Girls' singles =

Tournament details
- Dates: 26–30 July 2017
- Edition: 20
- Venue: Jaya Raya Sports Hall Training Center
- Location: Jakarta, Indonesia

The girls' singles tournament of the 2017 Asian Junior Badminton Championships was held from 26 July to 30 July 2017. The defending champion of the last edition is Chen Yufei from China. Gregoria Mariska Tunjung, Yeo Jia Min and Pattarasuda Chaiwan were the top 3 seeds in the tournament. Han Yue of China, the 4th seed, emerged as the champion after she beat 3rd seed Pattarasuda Chaiwan of Thailand in the finals with a score of 21–15, 21–13.

== Seeded ==
1. (Indonesia) Gregoria Mariska Tunjung (withdrew)
2. (Singapore) Yeo Jia Min (semifinals)
3. (Thailand) Pattarasuda Chaiwan (Finals)
4. (China) Han Yue (champion)
5. (India) Aakarshi Kashyap (quarterfinals)
6. (Thailand) Chananchida Jucharoen (first round)
7. (Thailand) Chasinee Korepap (third round)
8. (Indonesia) Sri Fatmawati (third round)

== Draw ==
=== Finals ===
Quarterfinals
(Malaysia) Eoon Qi Xuan	14	21	21
(China) Wang Zhiyi	21	15	13
4	(China) Han Yue	21	21
5	(India) Aakarshi Kashyap	8	16
(China) Li Wenmei	16	19
3	(Thailand) Pattarasuda Chaiwan	21	21
(Indonesia) Choirunnisa	18	21	20
2	(Singapore) Yeo Jia Min	21	15	22

Semifinals
(Malaysia) Eoon Qi Xuan	11	17
4	(China) Han Yue	21	21
3	(Thailand) Pattarasuda Chaiwan	15	21	21
2	(Singapore) Yeo Jia Min	21	17	17

Final
4	(China) Han Yue	21	21
3	(Thailand) Pattarasuda Chaiwan	15	13

=== Top half ===
==== Section 1 ====
First round
(Uzbekistan) S Sodikova	10	10
(Sri Lanka) D Dias	21	21
(Chinese Taipei) Hung E-t	13	12
(Malaysia) Eoon Q X	21	21
(Singapore) N I Khan	13	12
(South Korea) Kim S-m	21	21
6	(Thailand) C Jucharoen	19	21	15
(Myanmar) Thet H T	21	12	21
(Mongolia) K Darkhanbaatar	11	14
(Nepal) R Maharjan	21	21
(Macau) Ao I K	12	11
(India) A Chaliha	21	21
(Hong Kong) Yeung S Y	21	18	16
(China) Wang ZY	17	21	21

Second round
1	(Indonesia) G M Tunjung	w	/	o
(Sri Lanka) D Dias
(Malaysia) Eoon Q X	21	21
(South Korea) Kim S-m	11	11
(Myanmar) Thet H T	21	21
(Nepal) R Maharjan	12	8
(India) A Chaliha	19	21	13
(China) Wang ZY	21	19	21

Third round
(Sri Lanka) D Dias	8	5
(Malaysia) Eoon Q X	21	21
(Myanmar) Thet H T	7	9
(China) Wang ZY	21	21

Quarter finals
(Malaysia) Eoon Q X	14	21	21
(China) Wang ZY	21	15	13

==== Section 2 ====
First round
(Iran) S Abedkhojasteh	17	18
(Indonesia) S Sandradewi	21	21
(Philippines) M A Sevilla	21	21
(Kazakhstan) I Gordeyeva	13	17
(Chinese Taipei) Huang Y-h	21	21
(Sri Lanka) H N Ambalangodage	9	10
5	(India) A Kashyap	21	21
(Hong Kong) Wong H C	4	12
(Myanmar) Oo T T	6	6
(South Korea) Park G-e	21	21
(Singapore) J R Sito	15	13
(Indonesia) E M A Swastika	21	21
(Malaysia) Lim M C	22	19	19
(Thailand) N Aimsaard	20	21	21

Second round
4	(China) Han Y	18	21	21
(Indonesia) S Sandradewi	21	7	7
(Philippines) M A Sevilla	15	8
(Chinese Taipei) Huang Y-h	21	21
5	(India) A Kashyap	21	21
(South Korea) Park G-e	17	15
(Indonesia) E M A Swastika	21	7	21
(Thailand) N Aimsaard	16	21	13

Third round
4	(China) Han Y	21	21
(Chinese Taipei) Huang Y-h	16	9
5	(India) A Kashyap	21	21
(Indonesia) E M A Swastika	15	15

Quarter Finals
4	(China) Han Y	21	21
5	(India) A Kashyap	8	16

=== Bottom half ===
==== Section 3 ====
First round
(Hong Kong) Leung Y Y	16	21	12
(China) Li WM	21	16	21
(Vietnam) Tran T P T	21	21
(Singapore) B Lim	13	11
(Philippines) S J Barredo	21	16	21
(India) P Joshi	17	21	15
(Sri Lanka) N Teshani	8	10
8	(Indonesia) S Fatmawati	21	21
(Mongolia) G Baatarsuren	5	5
(Malaysia) Eng S J	21	21
(Macau) Zou Z L	7	8
(Chinese Taipei) Lin S-y	21	21
(Kazakhstan) A Zhumabek	21	21
(Nepal) S Mukhiya	13	11
(South Korea) An S-y	22	18	12
3	(Thailand) P Chaiwan	20	21	21

Second round
(China) Li WM	21	21
(Vietnam) Tran T P T	6	8
(Philippines) S J Barredo	19	16
8	(Indonesia) S Fatmawati	21	21
(Malaysia) Eng S J	22	21	16
(Chinese Taipei) Lin S-y	20	23	21
(Kazakhstan) A Zhumabek	6	9
3	(Thailand) P Chaiwan	21	21

Third round
(China) Li WM	21	21
8	(Indonesia) S Fatmawati	11	17
(Chinese Taipei) Lin S-y	7	11
3	(Thailand) P Chaiwan	21	21

Quarter Finals
(China) Li WM	16	19
3	(Thailand) P Chaiwan	21	21

==== Section 4 ====
First round
(India) I Sharma	13	12
(Chinese Taipei) Hsieh Y-y	21	21
(Indonesia) Choirunnisa	21	21
(Sri Lanka) H C Wijayarathne	8	7
(Uzbekistan) S Shavkatova	5	3
(South Korea) Sim Y-j	21	21
(China) Wei YX	18	22
7	(Thailand) C Korepap	21	24
(Macau) Wong C W	8	3
(Indonesia) A O Winata	21	21
(Nepal) J Gurung	6	19
(Hong Kong) Wong C C	21	21
(Myanmar) Phyo L L	7	8
(Philippines) A M N Albo	21	21

Second round
(Chinese Taipei) Hsieh Y-y	10	18
(Indonesia) Choirunnisa	21	21
(South Korea) Sim Y-j	9	22	15
7	(Thailand) C Korepap	21	20	21
(Indonesia) A O Winata	21	21
(Hong Kong) Wong C C	9	18
(Philippines) A M N Albo	13	5
2	(Singapore) Yeo J M	21	21

Third round
(Indonesia) Choirunnisa	21	16	21
7	(Thailand) C Korepap	15	21	8
(Indonesia) A O Winata	11	9
2	(Singapore) Yeo J M	21	21

Quarter Finals
(Indonesia) Choirunnisa	18	21	20
2	(Singapore) Yeo J M	21	15	22
