= Lee Ying Ying =

Malaysian badminton player (born 1997)

Lee Ying Ying 李盈盈
Personal information
- Born: 25 October 1997 (age 29) Ipoh, Perak, Malaysia

Sport
- Country: Malaysia
- Sport: Badminton
- Handedness: Right

Women's singles
- Highest ranking: 36 (19 July 2018)
- BWF profile
Medal record
Women's badminton
Representing Malaysia
SEA Games
Silver medal – second place	2017 Kuala Lumpur	Women's team
Bronze medal – third place	2019 Philippines	Women's team
World Junior Championships
Silver medal – second place	2015 Lima	Girls' singles
Asian Junior Championships
Bronze medal – third place	2012 Gimcheon	Mixed team

Lee Ying Ying (李盈盈, born 25 October 1997) is a Malaysian badminton player. Lee started playing badminton at aged 8 in Ipoh. She made her debut in the international tournament in 2015, and at the same year she was selected to join the national team. She was the silver medalist at the 2015 World Junior Championships, and won her first senior international tournament at the 2016 Romanian International.

== Achievements ==
=== BWF World Junior Championships ===
Girls' singles
Year	Venue	Opponent	Score	Result
2015	Centro de Alto Rendimiento de la Videna, Lima, Peru	(Malaysia) Goh Jin Wei	15–21, 16–21	Silver

=== BWF International Challenge/Series ===
Women's singles
Year	Tournament	Opponent	Score	Result
2014	Smiling Fish International	(Japan) Rei Nagata	12–21, 21–18, 18–21	(silver) Runner up
2016	Romanian International	(Malaysia) Lim Yin Fun	17–21, 21–13, 21–9	(gold) Winner
2016	Singapore International	(Indonesia) Asty Dwi Widyaningrum	19–21, 12–21	(silver) Runner up
2016	Swiss International	(Switzerland) Sabrina Jaquet	21–16, 19–21, 15–21	(silver) Runner-up
2017	Polish Open	(Japan) Yui Hashimoto	21–13, 19–21, 10–21	(silver) Runner-up
2017	Orleans International	(Scotland) Kirsty Gilmour	20–22, 11–21	(silver) Runner-up
2017	Malaysia International	(Malaysia) Selvaduray Kisona	21–16, 15–21, 17–21	(silver) Runner-up
2018	Iran Fajr International	(Malaysia) Thinaah Muralitharan	8–11, 6–11, 11–9, 9–11	(silver) Runner-up
2018	Malaysia International	(China) Wang Zhiyi	10–21, 24–22, 14–21	(silver) Runner-up

BWF International Challenge tournament
BWF International Series tournament
BWF Future Series tournament
