= Yeo Jia Min =

Singaporean badminton player

Yeo Jia Min 楊佳敏
- Yeo at the 2022 Singapore Open

Personal information
- Born: 1 February 1999 (age 27) Singapore
- Height: 1.64 m (5 ft 5 in)
- Weight: 55 kg (121 lb)

Sport
- Country: Singapore
- Sport: Badminton
- Handedness: Right
- Coached by: Kim Ji-hyun

Women's singles
- Highest ranking: 11 (27 May 2025)
- Current ranking: 50 (3 November 2026)
- BWF profile
Medal record
Women's badminton
Representing Singapore
Commonwealth Games
Bronze medal – third place	2022 Birmingham	Women's singles
Bronze medal – third place	2022 Birmingham	Mixed team
SEA Games
Bronze medal – third place	2015 Singapore	Women's team
Bronze medal – third place	2017 Kuala Lumpur	Women's team
Bronze medal – third place	2019 Philippines	Women's team
Bronze medal – third place	2021 Vietnam	Women's team
Bronze medal – third place	2023 Cambodia	Women's team
Bronze medal – third place	2025 Thailand	Women's team
Asian Junior Championships
Bronze medal – third place	2017 Jakarta	Girls' singles

Yeo Jia Min (Chinese: 楊佳敏; pinyin: Yáng Jiāmǐn; born 1 February 1999) is a Singaporean badminton player. She is a former World Junior No.1 and the first Singaporean in either the junior or senior categories to made it to the top of the BWF's ranking system.

== Early life and education ==
Yeo was born in Singapore. Initially a permanent resident, she became a Singaporean citizen sometime in her childhood. Yeo would begin playing badminton when she was seven years old and had often played with her parents. She subsequently started formal training under the tutelage of former national player Tan Eng Han at the Assumption English School (AES) in Bukit Panjang at the West Region of Singapore.

At nine, she competed in the 2008 Cheers Age Group Badminton Championships and won the Under-11 championship title. At age 10, she won the Under-11 singles title at an international level when she represented Singapore at the 2009 Li-Ning Youth International.

In 2011, Yeo was selected for the national intermediate squad and three years later, promoted to the senior team. Initially choosing Nanyang Girls' High School in Bukit Timah over a scholarship offer from Singapore Sports School, she later transferred to the Singapore Sports School after six months due to scheduling issues between her studies and training.

== Career ==
=== 2012–2014: Junior and senior circuits tryout ===
In 2012, Yeo participated in four junior championships, the national U19 championships, the Badminton Asia Youth U17 & U15 Championships, the World Junior Mixed Team Championships and the World Junior Championships Eye-Level Cups. She won the national U19 championships. She played in both the singles and doubles disciplines, with her best showing at the Badminton Asia Youth Under-15 girls' singles championships where she reached the quarter-finals.

In 2013, at age 14, Yeo played in her first senior tournament at the Singapore Open where she lost in the women's singles qualifying round to her compatriot Liang Xiaoyu in two games. In the women's doubles event, she partnered with Elaine Chua Yi Ling and lost in the first round to the Korean pairing of Chang Ye-na and Kim So-yeong. Later that year, she contested in the Badminton Asia Youth U17 & U15 Championships and emerged triumphant in the Under-15 girls' singles event.

In 2014, she competed in various senior and junior tournaments in multiple disciplines. Her best result came in the girls' singles event at the German Junior Open, where she lost in the semi-finals to then China's Qin Jinjing in 33 minutes.

=== 2015–2017: First senior title and World Junior #1 ===
In 2015, Yeo once again reached the semi-finals of the girls' singles event at the German Junior Open, but she lost to Denmark's Mia Blichfeldt. In June, she participated in her first SEA Games and managed to win bronze in the women's team event. In August, she finished as runner-up to Indonesia's Gregoria Mariska Tunjung at the Singapore International Series. In October, Yeo clinched two titles at the Badminton Asia U17 & U15 Junior Championships in Kudus, Indonesia. She defeated the unseeded Indonesian Sri Fatmawati in the Under-17 girls' singles final. Then, she partnered compatriot Crystal Wong to beat Japan's Natsu Saito and Rumi Yoshida to clinch the U-17 girls' doubles title.

In 2016, Yeo won the first senior title of her career when she defeated Ayumi Mine of Japan in the Vietnam Open Grand Prix in two straight games. She followed up her success with another title, at the junior level, in the Junior Grand Prix held in Jakarta, Indonesia. There, she defeated Kim Ga-eun of Korea in two tightly contested games, 21–19, 21–19, to win the final in 35 minutes.

In 2017, Yeo continued her good form in the junior tournaments by winning the Dutch Junior Open held in March by beating Pattarasuda Chaiwan of Thailand in two games. The following week, she reached the final of the German Junior Open but lost to Hirari Mizui of Japan. In June, Yeo was ranked World Junior No.1 in the girls' singles event after she overtook Malaysia's Goh Jin Wei, making it the first time that a Singaporean badminton player, in either junior or senior categories, made it to the top of the BWF's ranking system. In July, Yeo won a bronze medal at the Asian Junior Championships after reaching the semi-finals stage. However, she was defeated by Chaiwan this time, in a marathon three-set match that lasted for 63 minutes. In August, she won her second women's team bronze at the SEA Games where Singapore reached the semi-finals of the women's team competition but lost to Thailand, the eventual winner, 0–3.

=== 2018–2020: Two World Tour titles ===
In April 2018, Yeo competed at her first Commonwealth Games held in Gold Coast, Queensland, Australia. In June, she participated in the Mongolia International Series and was knocked out at the semi-finals by Joy Xuan Deng of Hong Kong in two straight sets. The following week, Yeo reached the final of White Nights, an International Challenge tournament held in Gatchina, Russia. There she met Deng once again and lost to her in a thrilling three-set match in 51 minutes. In August, Yeo continued her good showing in Vietnam by winning her second Vietnam Open title in three years. She defeated China's Han Yue, 21–19, 21–19 in the final to seal the victory. This is also her first World Tour success after BWF rebranded the tournaments in 2018. In September, Yeo took part in the Hyderabad Open and reached the semi-finals but she lost to Deng again, her third defeat to the same opponent on the tour that year.

In 2019, Yeo played in the German Open in March and lost to Ratchanok Intanon of Thailand in the quarter-finals, 21-7, 21-12. She then played in her first All England Open and was eliminated in the first round by China's former Olympic champion, Li Xuerui in two close games. In August, she won her first title of the year by winning the Hyderabad Open. In the final, she defeated An Se-young of Korea in a three-set battle that lasted 73 minutes. In the same month at the BWF World Championships, Yeo become the first female shuttler from Singapore to reach the quarter-finals after she defeated Vietnam's Vũ Thị Trang in the third round, in a 72 minutes battle. Yeo, who also defeated World No. 1, Akane Yamaguchi in the second round of the tournament met the 2013 World Champion, Ratchanok Intanon in the quarter-finals again and lost to her in two straight games in 41 minutes. At the year-end SEA Games held in Manila, Philippines, she won her third women's team bronze after Singapore reached the semi-finals of the women's team competition but lost to Indonesia, 1–3.

Due to the COVID-19 pandemic, the 2020 badminton season was shortened and Yeo participated in only five tournaments. Her best result was at the Badminton Asia Team Championships where Singapore women's team reached the quarter-finals of the competition.

=== 2021: Olympian ===
Yeo began the season on the Thailand leg of the world tour at the Yonex Thailand Open and the Toyota Thailand Open where she lost in the first round to Ratchanok Intanon and second round to An Se-young respectively. In June, she qualified for her first ever Olympic Games after placing 17th in BWF’s road to Tokyo rankings. In July, Yeo competed at the delayed 2020 Tokyo Olympics. In her first group stage game, she defeated Haramara Gaitan of Mexico in two straight games but then lost to Kim Ga-eun of Korea in the next match, ending her Olympics conquest. On her failure to make it to the knockout round, Yeo cried and apologised to local media for her exit in the games.

After the Olympics, she played on the European leg of the world tour held in Denmark, France and Germany. In the Denmark Open, she was eliminated in the first round by China's He Bing Jiao. In the French Open, she reached the quarter-finals but lost to An Se-young. In the Hylo Open held in Germany, she managed to reach her first final of the year, but she was defeated by the fifth seed, Busanan Ongbamrungphan of Thailand, in two straight games. In November, Yeo participated in the Indonesia Masters and Indonesia Open held in Bali. She was knockout by her former junior rivals, Phittayaporn Chaiwan in the quarter-finals and Akane Yamaguchi in the second round respectively.

In December, Yeo became the first Singaporean to qualify and play in the season-ending BWF World Tour Finals. She made her debut by playing Akane Yamaguchi but lost 11–21, 14–21. She then had to retire in the next match against Busanan Ongbamrungphan when she was trailing 7–21, 9–15 due to a right knee injury. At the year end World Championships held in Huelva, Spain, Yeo, the 15th seed, was upset in the second round by the unseeded Kirsty Gilmour of Scotland.

=== 2022: Commonwealth Games bronze medalists ===
In January, Yeo withdrew from the India Open before she could play her quarter-finals match against Thailand's Supanida Katethong, initially reported as having a high fever. Upon her return to Singapore, she was found to be infected with the COVID-19 virus. In April, she returned to tour at the Korea Open and managed to see off South Korea's Sim Yu-jin in the first round before losing to her compatriot An Se-young in the second round. The following week, Yeo had a better showing at the Korea Masters where she reached the quarter-finals but lost to China's Wang Zhi Yi in straight sets. At the Badminton Asia Championships held in Manila, Philippines, she was eliminated in the second round after losing to Japan's Sayaka Takahashi in a three sets battle that lasted 49 minutes. In May, Yeo participated in the 31st SEA Games and clinched a joint-bronze in the women's team event. In the singles event, she reached the quarter-finals before losing to Thailand’s Phittayaporn Chaiwan. In June, she competed at the Indonesia Masters, Indonesia Open and Malaysia Open but were eliminated in the first round of all three by Supanida Katethong, Tai Tzu-ying and An Se-young respectively.

In July, at the Singapore Open, she reached the second round before bowing out against Thailand's Pornpawee Chochuwong in three sets. At the 22nd Commonwealth Games held in Birmingham, England, Yeo won a bronze medal as Singapore finished in third place at the mixed team event, having defeated England 3–0. A few days later, she won another bronze medal after defeating Scotland's Kirsty Gilmour, 21–14, 22–20 in the women's singles bronze medal match. In August, Yeo missed out the BWF World Championships after testing positive for Covid-19 again. However, she recovered in time to take part in the Japan Open where she would suffer another first round defeat at the hand of Supanida Katethong. In October, Yeo played in both the Denmark and French Open and did not perform well, losing in the first round to Japan's Aya Ohori and China's Chen Yu Fei respectively in straight sets. In November, at the Hylo Open, Yeo advanced past the first round after defeating Chinese Tapei's Pai Yu-po in three sets. She, however, could not overcome Spain's Carolina Marín in her next matchup, losing in straight sets, 14–21, 17–21. Yeo concluded her 2022 season with yet another first round defeat at the Australia Open, her seventh of the year on tour, after losing to Pai Yu Po.

=== 2023: SEA Games Team bronze and Polish Open title ===
Yeo started her new season with first round defeat to Pornpawee Chochuwong at the Malaysia and India Open respectively in straight games. At the Indonesia Masters, she faced another first round defeat, losing a closely contested rubber game against Line Christophersen of Denmark. In February, Yeo played only one match during the Badminton Asia Mixed Team Championships, where Singapore did not make it to the knockout stage. She competed in the opening round and suffered a defeat to Kim Ga-eun from South Korea. In March, Yeo made it to the main draw of the All England Open after the withdrawal of Indian shuttler Saina Nehwal. She however, lost to China's Han Yue in the first round. The following week, she claimed her first title since 2019 by winning the Polish Open. In the final, she defeated Neslihan Yiğit from Turkey. Yeo continued her good form at the Spain Masters and made it to the semi-finals, but lost to P. V. Sindhu in two closely contested games. At the Orléans Masters, she made it to the quarter-finals for the third tournament in a row but was outclassed by Carolina Marín.

At the Badminton Asia Championships, she faced early elimination in the initial rounds. In May, at the SEA Games, Yeo took part in only the team event and won all her matches to help Singapore to clinch a joint-bronze medal with the Philippines. However, her participation in the Sudirman Cup yielded mixed results, with Yeo losing two out of three matches, contributing to Singapore's inability to progress to the knockout stage. In the latter part of 2023, her performance appeared inconsistent, marked by sporadic success on the badminton circuit with quarter-finals appearances at the Thailand, Australia, and Kumamoto Masters.

=== 2024: Breakthrough Olympic Run ===
Yeo had an active and competitive 2024 BWF season, participating in numerous high-profile tournaments on the BWF World Tour. She started the season with a strong performance at the India Open, where she secured a semi-finals finish at the Super 750 event, marking one of her best results of the year. Throughout the season, she consistently reached the quarter-finals in several major tournaments, including the Malaysia Open, China Open, Korea Open, Denmark Open and China Masters.

One of her most significant achievements in 2024 was her performance at the Paris 2024 Olympics, where she advanced past the group stage and reached the round of 16. She secured victories against Dorsa Yavarivafa and Kate Ludik in the group stage before narrowly losing a three-game battle against Aya Ohori from Japan. This made her the first Singaporean women's singles player to reach the Olympic knockout rounds since Gu Juan in 2012.

Despite these successes, Yeo also faced challenges, experiencing early exits in tournaments such as the All England Open, Indonesia Masters, and Singapore Open, often being eliminated in the first or second round. She also represented Singapore in the Uber Cup and the Badminton Asia Team Championships, contributing to the national team’s campaign.

== Awards ==
Yeo received the 2020 Meritorious Award from the Singapore National Olympic Committee.

== Achievements ==
=== Commonwealth Games ===
Women's singles
Year	Venue	Opponent	Score	Result	Ref.
2022	National Exhibition Centre; Birmingham, England	(Scotland) Kirsty Gilmour	21–14, 22–20	Bronze	

=== Asian Junior Championships ===
Girls' singles
Year	Venue	Opponent	Score	Result	Ref.
2017	Jaya Raya Sports Hall Training Center; Jakarta, Indonesia	(Thailand) Pattarasuda Chaiwan	21–15, 17–21, 17–21	Bronze	

=== BWF World Tour (3 titles, 1 runner-up) ===
The BWF World Tour, which was announced on 19 March 2017 and implemented in 2018, is a series of elite badminton tournaments, sanctioned by Badminton World Federation (BWF). The BWF World Tour is divided into six levels, namely World Tour Finals, Super 1000, Super 750, Super 500, Super 300 (part of the BWF World Tour), and the BWF Tour Super 100.

Women's singles
Year	Tournament	Level	Opponent	Score	Result	Ref.
2018	Vietnam Open	Super 100	(China) Han Yue	21–19, 21–19	(gold) Winner	
2019	Hyderabad Open	Super 100	(South Korea) An Se-young	12–21, 21–17, 21–19	(gold) Winner	
2021	Hylo Open	Super 500	(Thailand) Busanan Ongbamrungphan	10–21, 14–21	(silver) Runner-up	
2025	German Open	Super 300	(Vietnam) Nguyễn Thùy Linh	21–16, 21–17	(gold) Winner	

=== BWF Grand Prix (1 title) ===
The BWF Grand Prix had two levels, the Grand Prix and Grand Prix Gold. It was a series of badminton tournaments sanctioned by the Badminton World Federation (BWF) and played between 2007 and 2017.

Women's singles
Year	Tournament	Opponent	Score	Result	Ref.
2016	Vietnam Open	(Japan) Ayumi Mine	21–14, 21–17	(gold) Winner	

BWF Grand Prix Gold tournament
BWF Grand Prix tournament

=== BWF International Challenge/Series (1 title, 2 runners-up) ===
Women's singles
Year	Tournament	Opponent	Score	Result	Ref.
2015	Singapore International	(Indonesia) Gregoria Mariska Tunjung	20–22, 15–21	(silver) Runner-up	
2018	White Nights	(Hong Kong) Joy Xuan Deng	7–21, 21–13, 17–21	(silver) Runner-up	
2023	Polish Open	(Turkey) Neslihan Yiğit	21–13, 21–11	(gold) Winner	

BWF International Challenge tournament
BWF International Series tournament
