= Eoon Qi Xuan =

Malaysian badminton player

Eoon Qi Xuan 温琦煊
Personal information
- Born: 2 November 2000 (age 26) Taiping, Perak, Malaysia

Sport
- Country: Malaysia
- Sport: Badminton
- Handedness: Right

Women's singles
- Highest ranking: 97 (1 November 2022)
- BWF profile
Medal record
Women's badminton
Representing Malaysia
Sudirman Cup
Bronze medal – third place	2021 Vantaa	Mixed team
Asia Team Championships
Bronze medal – third place	2020 Manila	Women's team
Bronze medal – third place	2022 Selangor	Women's team
SEA Games
Bronze medal – third place	2019 Philippines	Women's team
World Junior Championships
Silver medal – second place	2017 Yogyakarta	Mixed team
Asian Junior Championships
Bronze medal – third place	2017 Jakarta	Girls' singles
Bronze medal – third place	2017 Jakarta	Mixed team
Bronze medal – third place	2018 Jakarta	Mixed team

Eoon Qi Xuan (born 2 November 2000) is a Malaysian badminton player. She graduated from the Bukit Jalil Sports School and was promoted to the national senior squad in January 2019. She was the girls' singles bronze medalist at the 2017 Asian Junior Championships, and was part of the junior team that won the bronze medal in 2017, 2018 Asian and a silver at the 2017 World Junior Championships. She was the member of Malaysian national women's team who won the bronze medal at the 2019 SEA Games and 2020 Asia Team Championships. She was also part of the national mixed team that won bronze at the 2021 Sudirman Cup.

== Achievements ==
=== Asian Junior Championships ===
Girls' singles
Year	Venue	Opponent	Score	Result
2017	Jaya Raya Sports Hall Training Center; Jakarta, Indonesia	(China) Han Yue	11–21, 17–21	Bronze

=== BWF International Challenge/Series (1 runner-up) ===
Women's singles
Year	Tournament	Opponent	Score	Result
2019	Malaysia International	(Indonesia) Sri Fatmawati	19–21, 8–21	(silver) Runner-up

BWF International Challenge tournament
BWF International Series tournament
BWF Future Series tournament
