= Goh Jin Wei =

Malaysian badminton player

Goh Jin Wei 吴堇溦
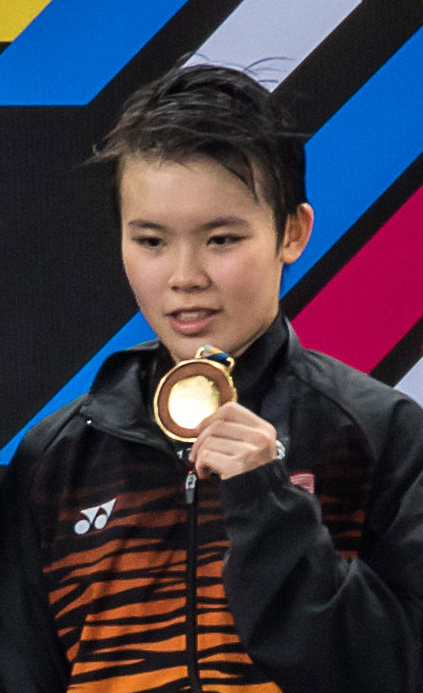
- Goh at the 2017 SEA Games

Personal information
- Born: 30 January 2000 (age 26) Bukit Mertajam, Penang, Malaysia
- Height: 1.58 m (5 ft 2 in)

Sport
- Country: Malaysia
- Sport: Badminton
- Handedness: Right
- Coached by: Nova Armada

Women's singles
- Highest ranking: 24 (9 August 2018)
- Current ranking: 52 (6 October 2026)
- BWF profile
Medal record
Women's badminton
Representing Malaysia
Sudirman Cup
Bronze medal – third place	2023 Suzhou	Mixed team
Commonwealth Games
Gold medal – first place	2022 Birmingham	Mixed team
Asia Team Championships
Bronze medal – third place	2020 Manila	Women's team
SEA Games
Gold medal – first place	2017 Kuala Lumpur	Women's singles
Silver medal – second place	2015 Singapore	Women's team
Silver medal – second place	2017 Kuala Lumpur	Women's team
Bronze medal – third place	2015 Singapore	Women's singles
Youth Olympic Games
Gold medal – first place	2018 Buenos Aires	Girls' singles
World Junior Championships
Gold medal – first place	2015 Lima	Girls' singles
Gold medal – first place	2018 Markham	Girls' singles
Silver medal – second place	2016 Bilbao	Mixed team
Silver medal – second place	2017 Yogyakarta	Mixed team
Bronze medal – third place	2017 Yogyakarta	Girls' singles
Asian Junior Championships
Bronze medal – third place	2015 Bangkok	Girls' singles
Bronze medal – third place	2017 Jakarta	Mixed team

Goh Jin Wei (simplified Chinese: 吴堇溦; traditional Chinese: 吳堇溦; pinyin: Wú Jǐnwēi, born 30 January 2000) is a Malaysian badminton player. A Youth Olympic champion, two-time world junior champion and SEA Games champion, she won the girls' singles gold medal at the 2018 Summer Youth Olympics and the 2015 and 2018 World Junior Championships. Her victory at the 2018 Youth Olympics in Buenos Aires made her Malaysia's first ever Youth Olympic gold medalist. She also became the first badminton player to win both the World Junior Championships and Youth Olympic Games singles titles.

Goh won her first World Junior Championships gold medal in 2015 by defeating compatriot Lee Ying Ying in the girls' singles final. She subsequently won a bronze medal at the 2017 BWF World Junior Championships before reclaiming the title in 2018 by defeating Denmark's Line Christophersen. At the 2018 Youth Olympics, she defeated China's Wang Zhiyi in the final to secure the historic gold medal. At senior level, she won the women's singles gold medal at the 2017 SEA Games, becoming the first Malaysian to win the event since Wong Mew Choo in 2003. She also won a women's singles bronze medal at the 2015 SEA Games and silver medals in the women's team events at the 2015 and 2017 SEA Games.

Following a series of health-related setbacks, Goh temporarily retired from professional badminton in 2021 before returning to international competition. She subsequently represented Malaysia in women's singles at the 2024 Summer Olympics in Paris. In 2026, she reached the final of the 2026 Thailand Masters and captured the women's singles title at the Singapore International Challenge, ending a prolonged senior international title drought.

== Early life ==
Goh Jin Wei was born in Bukit Mertajam, Penang into a Malaysian Chinese family, to Loh Bee Sim and Goh Boon Huat. Sister to Goh Jin Di. She first started playing badminton at the age of six as a hobby. Her father noticed her talent and let her train under the guidance of Teh Peng Huat, Lee Chong Wei's former coach. When she was 11, she won the Under-12 Grand Prix Finals and the Malaysian School Sports Council representing her primary school, SJKC Jit Sin ‘B’. She was drafted into the Malaysia national team at the age of 14.

== Career ==
=== Junior level ===
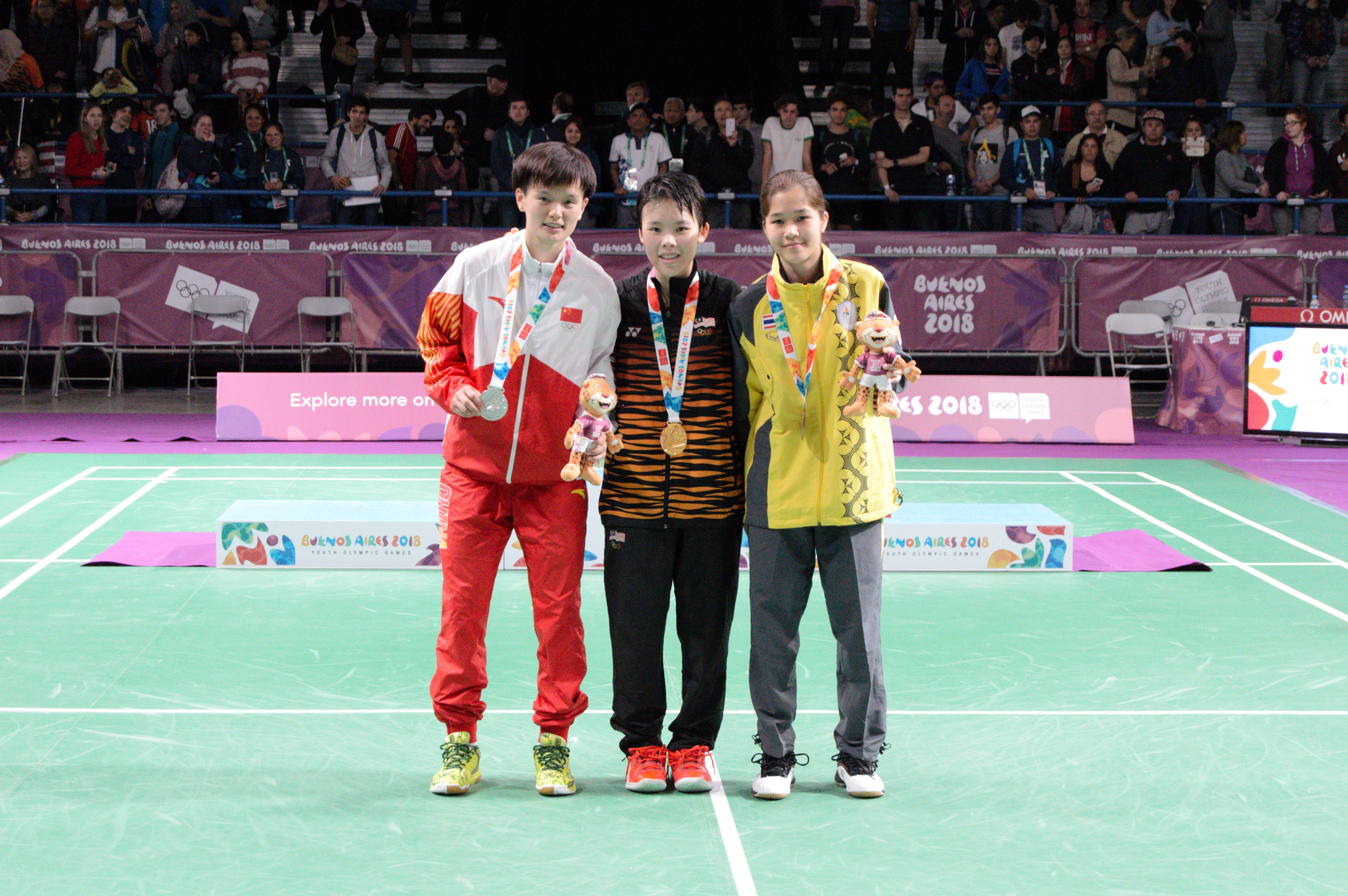
Goh with Wang Zhiyi and Phittayaporn Chaiwan at the 2018 Summer Youth Olympics

At the 2015 World Junior Championships, Goh won the girls singles' event by defeating compatriot Lee Ying Ying in the final. In 2017, she earned a bronze medal in the singles event after losing to Han Yue in the semifinals. Goh participated at the Youth Olympic Games in Buenos Aires where she defeated top seed, Phittayaporn Chaiwan in the semifinals. In the final, Goh defeated Wang Zhiyi to win Malaysia's first gold medal at the Youth Olympic Games. In doing so, Goh became the first ever shuttler to win both World Junior Championships and the Youth Olympic Games title. At the 2018 World Junior Championships, Goh reached the final where she defeated Line Christophersen to capture her second World Junior Championship title.

=== 2015–2020 ===
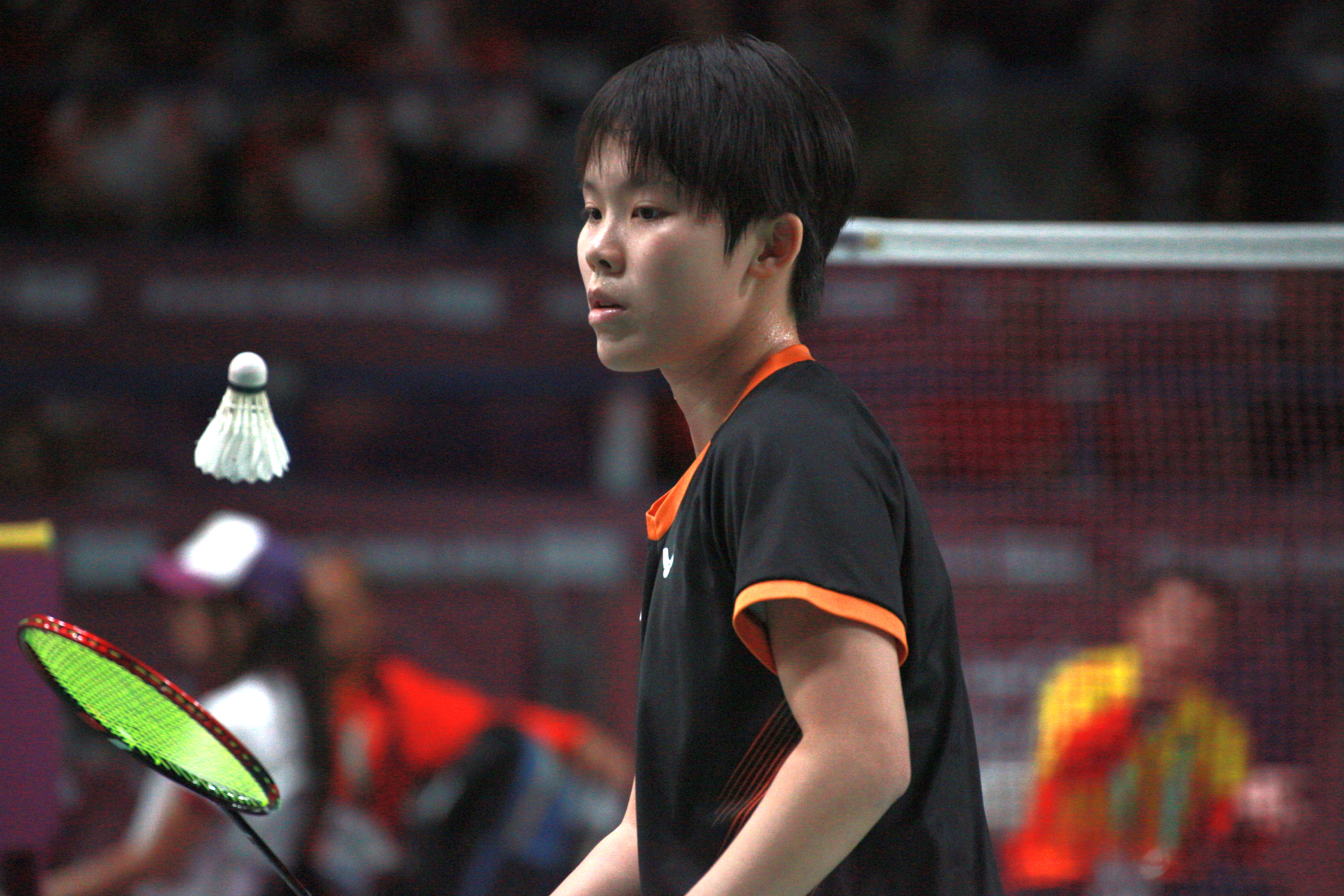
Goh at 2018 Summer Youth Olympics

In February 2015, Goh became the youngest-ever national winner at the age of 15 after defeating Lim Yin Fun in the final of the Kuala Lumpur Open. At the 2015 SEA Games, Goh won the bronze medal in women's singles event and a silver medal in women's team event. She won her first senior title, the Belgian International, at the age of 15 by defeating Kirsty Gilmour in the final. She won her second senior title at the Vietnam International.

In April 2016, she won the Orleans International. Goh was named in the Malaysian squad for the 2016 Uber Cup. She made her Super Series debut at the 2016 Australian Open where she defeated Michelle Li in the first round before losing to eventual champion, Saina Nehwal in the second round. In her first Grand Prix Gold tournament, Goh reached the final of the Indonesian Masters before losing to top seed, Busanan Ongbamrungphan. She then lost in the semifinals of the Thailand Open to the same opponent. In December 2016, she became national No. 1 shuttler for the first time in her career after surpassing Tee Jing Yi in BWF Ranking.

In January 2017, Goh competed at the Malaysian Masters where she lost to Lee Chia-hsin in the second round after playing with an injury. She made her return at the Malaysia Open in April and was defeated in the second round by Chen Yufei. In July 2017, she reached the final of the Chinese Taipei Open where she lost to Saena Kawakami. At the 2017 SEA Games in August, Goh won all her matches in the women's team event. The team made it to the finals where they lost to Thailand, taking home the silver medal. In the women's singles event, Goh defeated her compatriot and senior, Soniia Cheah in the final, becoming the first Malaysian to win the women's singles gold medal since Wong Mew Choo in 2003. In September 2017, Goh reached the final of the Singapore International, which she lost to Ruselli Hartawan.

In March 2018, she competed in her first All England Open but lost to Aya Ohori in the second round. In June 2018, she reached the quarterfinals of the Malaysia Open before losing to eventual winner, Tai Tzu-ying. In her World Championships debut, she lost to the reigning world champion, Nozomi Okuhara in the third round. At the Korea Masters in November, Goh lost in the semifinals to Li Xuerui.

In January 2019, Goh beat Akane Yamaguchi, Zhang Yiman and He Bingjiao to reached the semifinals of 2019 Malaysia Masters before losing to eventual winner, Ratchanok Intanon. At the 2019 German Open, Goh reached the semifinals where she lost to Akane Yamaguchi. Goh would later suffer from a stomach ailment and she played her last BWF tournament in 2019 at the Australian Open where she lost to Soniia Cheah in the first round. In October, she underwent surgery due to the ailment. She made her return at the 2020 Thailand Masters, losing to Akane Yamaguchi in the first round. Goh was included in the Malaysia's 2020 Badminton Asia Team Championships squad which would be her final BWF tournament in 2020.

=== 2021–present: Retirement and return to badminton ===
In March 2021, Goh reached the quarterfinals of Orléans Masters. In June, Goh competed at the Spanish International, reaching the final before losing to Kisona Selvaduray. In September 2021, Goh announced her retirement from professional badminton in a YouTube video, citing health reasons after her colectomy surgery back in 2019. However, Goh returned to professional badminton after signing a three-year contract with Kuala Lumpur Racquet Club as an independent player on 6 January 2022 while reiterating that she would not be able to give her full commitment as a player with the national team due to her health issues. She was due to appear in the 2022 Syed Modi International and 2022 Odisha Open after having registered for the tournaments, but was asked to withdraw by the Badminton Association of Malaysia (BAM). On 21 January 2022, BAM issued her a backdated two-year ban from participating in Badminton World Federation-sanctioned tournaments, starting from when she left the national team in September 2021. The ban was issued to her and Lee Zii Jia after the latter quit the national team on 19 January 2022. On 27 January 2022, after submitting her appeal to BAM, the ban was rescinded.

The 2022 Korea Open was Goh's first tournament after the rescinding of her ban where she was eliminated in the quarterfinals by Kim Ga-eun. In October 2022, she reached her first BWF World Tour final and finished as runner-up at the 2022 Vietnam Open Super 100 tournament.

Goh competed for Malaysia at the 2024 Summer Olympics in the women's singles event. She was drawn into Group H together with Kim Ga-eun from Korea who was the tournament's 12th seed, and Johanita Scholtz of South Africa. Goh won her first match against Johanita Scholtz in a straight game (23–21, 21–11). She then lost to Kim Ga-eun after a 65-minute rubber set battle 17–21, 22–20, 21–23 to finish second in Group H, ending her maiden Olympic campaign.

After the Paris Olympics and throughout 2025, Goh continued to be troubled by her poor health. She suffered many first-round exits from all international and World Tour competitions. causing her world ranking to slip behind other younger Malaysian female players, including Letshanaa Karupathevan and Wong Ling Ching. However, she persisted and managed to reach the final of 2026 Thailand Masters, beating both Letshanaa Karupathevan and Wong Ling Ching along the way, all in rubber-game victories. She became the first Malaysian women's singles player to reach the final of a World Tour 300 event. However, the accumulated toll proved too heavy in the title clash, with Goh losing the opening game 8–21 to India's Devika Sihag before retiring from the match due to fatigue while trailing 3–6 in the second.

== Achievements ==
=== SEA Games ===
Women's singles
Year	Venue	Opponent	Score	Result
2015	Singapore Indoor Stadium, Singapore	(Indonesia) Hanna Ramadini	21–16, 12–21,18–21	Bronze
2017	Axiata Arena, Kuala Lumpur, Malaysia	(Malaysia) Soniia Cheah	21–11, 21–10	Gold

=== Youth Olympic Games ===
Girls' singles
Year	Venue	Opponent	Score	Result
2018	Tecnópolis, Buenos Aires, Argentina	(China) Wang Zhiyi	16–21, 21–13, 21–19	Gold

=== World Junior Championships ===
Girls' singles
Year	Venue	Opponent	Score	Result
2015	Centro de Alto Rendimiento de la Videna, Lima, Peru	(Malaysia) Lee Ying Ying	21–15, 21–16	Gold
2017	GOR Among Rogo, Yogyakarta, Indonesia	(China) Han Yue	9–21, 10–21	Bronze
2018	Markham Pan Am Centre, Markham, Canada	(Denmark) Line Christophersen	21–13, 21–11	Gold

=== BWF World Tour (2 runners-up) ===
The BWF World Tour, which was announced on 19 March 2017 and implemented in 2018, is a series of elite badminton tournaments sanctioned by the Badminton World Federation (BWF). The BWF World Tour is divided into levels of World Tour Finals, Super 1000, Super 750, Super 500, Super 300, and the BWF Tour Super 100.

Women's singles
Year	Tournament	Level	Opponent	Score	Result
2022	Vietnam Open	Super 100	(Vietnam) Nguyễn Thùy Linh	15–21, 13–21	(silver) Runner-up
2026	Thailand Masters	Super 300	(India) Devika Sihag	8–21, 3–6 retired	(silver) Runner-up

=== BWF Grand Prix (2 runners-up) ===
The BWF Grand Prix had two levels, the Grand Prix and Grand Prix Gold. It was a series of badminton tournaments sanctioned by the Badminton World Federation (BWF) and played between 2007 and 2017.

Women's singles
Year	Tournament	Opponent	Score	Result
2016	Indonesian Masters	(Thailand) Busanan Ongbamrungphan	15–21, 13–21	(silver) Runner-up
2017	Chinese Taipei Open	(Japan) Saena Kawakami	17–21, 17–21	(silver) Runner-up

BWF Grand Prix Gold tournament

=== BWF International Challenge/Series (4 titles, 2 runners-up) ===
Women's singles
Year	Tournament	Opponent	Score	Result
2015	Belgian International	(Scotland) Kirsty Gilmour	21–15, 21–18	(gold) Winner
2015	Vietnam International Series	(Chinese Taipei) Chen Su-yu	21–9, 21–13	(gold) Winner
2016	Orleans International	(Indonesia) Fitriani	15–21, 21–10, 21–7	(gold) Winner
2017	Singapore International	(Indonesia) Ruselli Hartawan	13–21, 21–10, 19–21	(silver) Runner-up
2021	Spanish International	(Malaysia) Kisona Selvaduray	14–21, 19–21	(silver) Runner-up
2026	Singapore International	(Indonesia) Komang Ayu Cahya Dewi	21–11, 21–11	(gold) Winner

BWF International Challenge tournament
BWF International Series tournament

=== BWF Junior International (2 titles) ===
Girls' singles
Year	Tournament	Opponent	Score	Result
2015	German Junior International	(Denmark) Mia Blichfeldt	21–9, 21–16	(gold) Winner

Mixed doubles
Year	Tournament	Partner	Opponent	Score	Result
2015	Dutch Junior International	(Malaysia) Tan Jinn Hwa	(Malaysia) Goh Sze Fei (Malaysia) Lee Ying Ying	21–18, 18–21, 21–17	(gold) Winner

BWF Junior International Grand Prix tournament
BWF Junior International Challenge tournament
BWF Junior International Series tournament
BWF Junior Future Series tournament

== Awards and accolades ==
Year	Award	Category	Result	Ref(s)
2015	SAM-100PLUS Awards	Best Young Athlete	Won	
2018	National Sports Awards	OCM Special Awards	Won	
2018	The Malaysia Book of Records	First Malaysian to win gold medal in Youth Olympic Games in Individual sports	Won	
