= Lalinrat Chaiwan =

Thai badminton player

Lalinrat Chaiwan ลลินรัตน์ ไชยวรรณ
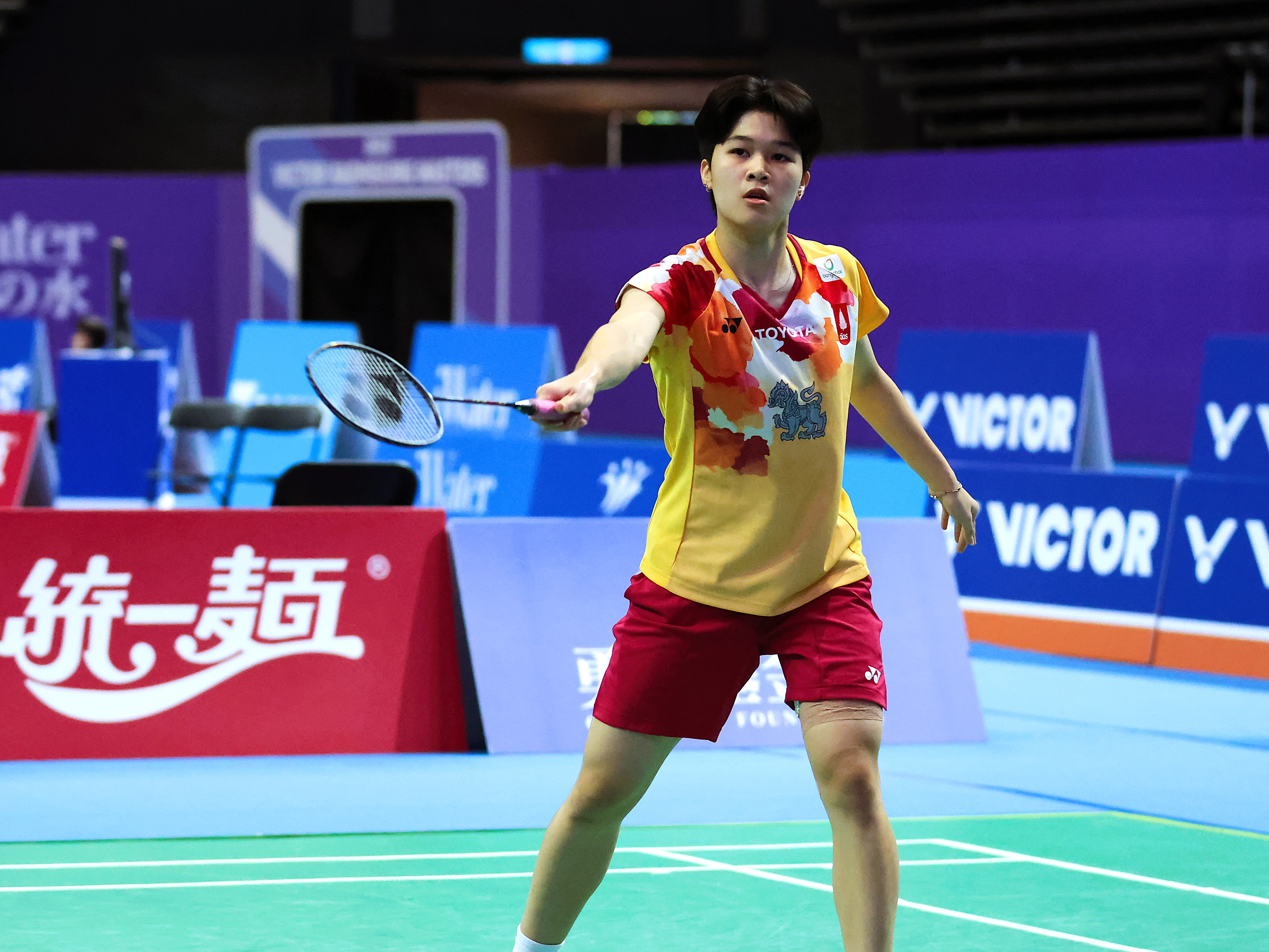
- Chaiwan at the 2023 Kaohsiung Masters

Personal information
- Born: Pattarasuda Chaiwan ภัทรสุดา ไชยวรรณ; 21 February 2001 (age 25) Lampang Province, Thailand
- Height: 1.64 m (5 ft 5 in)
- Weight: 52 kg (115 lb)

Sport
- Country: Thailand
- Sport: Badminton
- Handedness: Right

Women's singles
- Highest ranking: 16 (8 November 2022)
- Current ranking: 76 (27 January 2026)
- BWF profile
Medal record
Women's badminton
Representing Thailand
Uber Cup
Bronze medal – third place	2020 Aarhus	Women's team
Bronze medal – third place	2022 Bangkok	Women's team
Asia Mixed Team Championships
Bronze medal – third place	2023 Dubai	Mixed team
Asia Team Championships
Silver medal – second place	2024 Selangor	Women's team
Bronze medal – third place	2020 Manila	Women's team
SEA Games
Gold medal – first place	2017 Kuala Lumpur	Women's team
Gold medal – first place	2021 Vietnam	Women's team
Gold medal – first place	2023 Cambodia	Women's team
Silver medal – second place	2021 Vietnam	Women's singles
Silver medal – second place	2023 Cambodia	Women's singles
World University Games
Bronze medal – third place	2021 Chengdu	Mixed team
Youth Olympic Games
Bronze medal – third place	2018 Buenos Aires	Girls' singles
World Junior Championships
Bronze medal – third place	2016 Bilbao	Mixed team
Bronze medal – third place	2019 Kazan	Girls' singles
Bronze medal – third place	2019 Kazan	Mixed team
Asian Junior Championships
Gold medal – first place	2019 Suzhou	Mixed team
Silver medal – second place	2017 Jakarta	Girls' singles
Bronze medal – third place	2016 Bangkok	Mixed team

Lalinrat Chaiwan (Thai: ลลินรัตน์ ไชยวรรณ; born Pattarasuda Chaiwan (Thai: ภัทรสุดา ไชยวรรณ), 21 February 2001) is a Thai badminton player. She has shown her talent as a badminton player in the junior event tournament. She changed her first name to Phittayaporn (Thai: พิทยาภรณ์) after visiting a temple for prayers for a brighter career in badminton. She was crowned champion at the Grand Prix junior tournament in 2017 India and 2018 German, also occupied the girls' singles number 1 in the BWF World Junior Ranking.

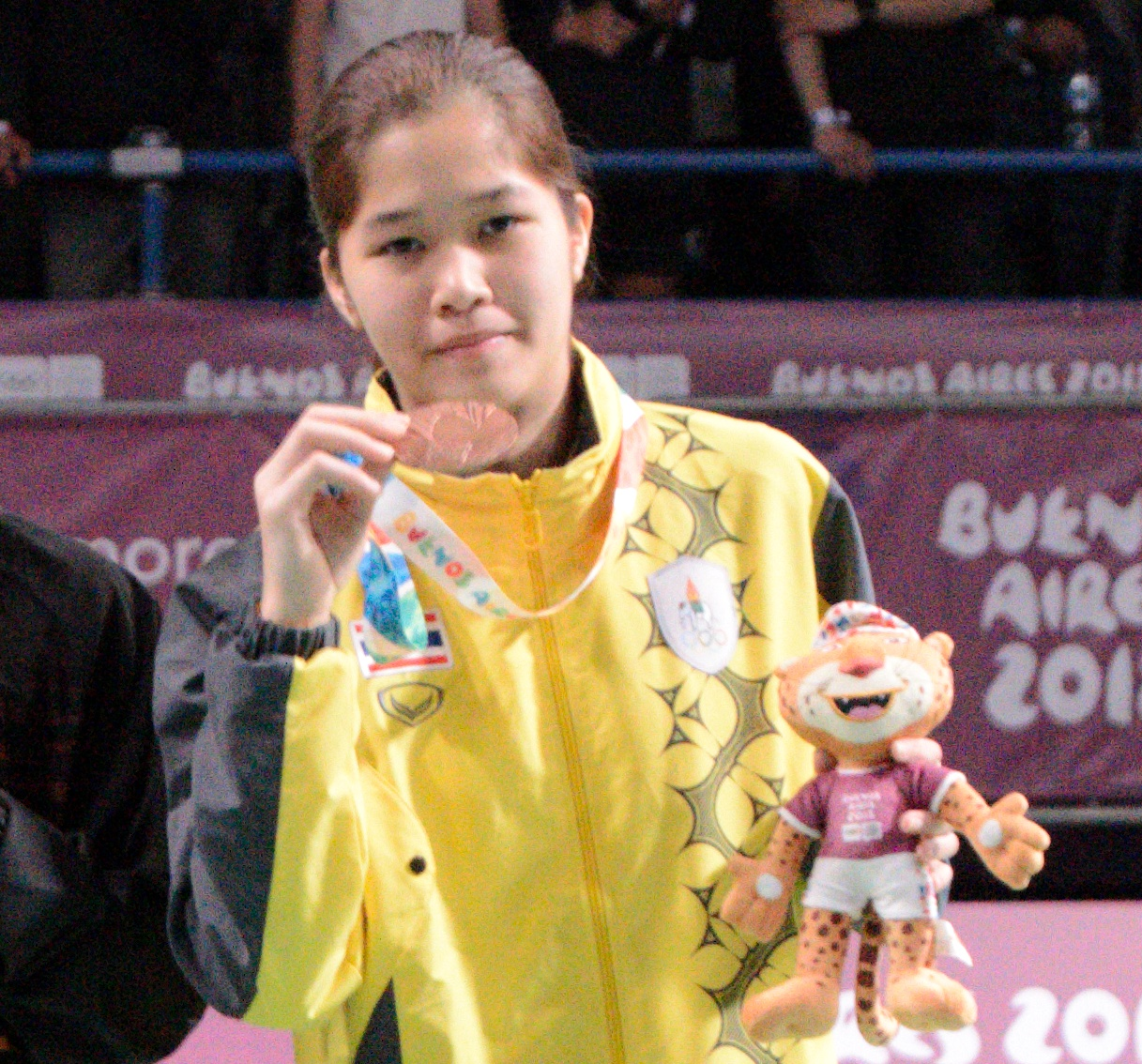
Chaiwan with her bronze medal of the 2018 Summer Youth Olympics

Born in Lampang Province, Chaiwan was the silver medalist at the 2017 Asian Junior Championships, where she was before won the Junior U–15 Championships in 2015, and U–17 in 2016. She was part of the national team that won the gold medal at the 2017 SEA Games in the women's team event. She represented her country at the 2018 Summer Youth Olympics in Buenos Aires, Argentina, won a bronze medal in the girls' singles event.

== Achievements ==
=== SEA Games ===
Women's singles
Year	Venue	Opponent	Score	Result
2021	Bac Giang Gymnasium; Bắc Giang, Vietnam	(Thailand) Pornpawee Chochuwong	14–21, 16–21	Silver
2023	Morodok Techo Badminton Hall; Phnom Penh, Cambodia	(Thailand) Supanida Katethong	12–21, 14–21	Silver

=== Youth Olympic Games ===
Girls' singles
Year	Venue	Opponent	Score	Result
2018	Tecnópolis; Buenos Aires, Argentina	(Singapore) Jaslyn Hooi	21–9, 21–13	Bronze

=== World Junior Championships ===
Girls' singles
Year	Venue	Opponent	Score	Result
2019	Kazan Gymnastics Center; Kazan, Russia	(Japan) Riko Gunji	16–21, 19–21	Bronze

=== Asian Junior Championships ===
Girls' singles
Year	Venue	Opponent	Score	Result
2017	Jaya Raya Sports Hall Training Center; Jakarta, Indonesia	(China) Han Yue	15–21, 13–21	Silver

=== BWF World Tour (1 title, 1 runner-up) ===
The BWF World Tour, which was announced on 19 March 2017 and implemented in 2018, is a series of elite badminton tournaments sanctioned by the Badminton World Federation (BWF). The BWF World Tours are divided into levels of World Tour Finals, Super 1000, Super 750, Super 500, Super 300 (part of the HSBC World Tour), and the BWF Tour Super 100.

Women's singles
Year	Tournament	Level	Opponent	Score	Result
2019	Syed Modi International	Super 300	(Spain) Carolina Marín	12–21, 16–21	(silver) Runner-up
2023	Guwahati Masters	Super 100	(Denmark) Line Christophersen	21–14, 17–21, 21–16	(gold) Winner

=== BWF International Challenge/Series (3 titles, 4 runners-up) ===
Women singles
Year	Tournament	Opponent	Score	Result
2018	Austrian International	(Denmark) Anna Thea Madsen	21–23, 17–21	(silver) Runner-up
2019	Lao International	(Japan) Natsuki Oie	20–22, 21–23	(silver) Runner-up
2019	Azerbaijan International	(Belgium) Lianne Tan	21–15, 21–16	(gold) Winner
2019	Spanish International	(Scotland) Kirsty Gilmour	21–12, 21–15	(gold) Winner
2024	Bangladesh International	(Ukraine) Polina Buhrova	19–21, 19–21	(silver) Runner-up
2024	Nepal International	(India) Ira Sharma	22–20, 21–12	(gold) Winner
2025	Sri Lanka International	(Thailand) Tidapron Kleebyeesun	21–13, 14–21, 14–21	(silver) Runner-up

BWF International Challenge tournament
BWF International Series tournament

=== BWF Junior International (8 titles, 4 runners-up) ===
Girls' singles
Year	Tournament	Opponent	Score	Result
2016	Granular Junior Open	(Malaysia) Ng Qi Xuan	21–18, 21–13	(gold) Winner
2017	Dutch Junior International	(Singapore) Yeo Jia Min	16–21, 15–21	(silver) Runner-up
2017	Banthongyord Junior International	(Indonesia) Gregoria Mariska Tunjung	11–21, 14–21	(silver) Runner-up
2017	Jaya Raya Junior International	(Singapore) Jaslyn Hooi	22–20, 21–12	(gold) Winner
2017	India Junior International	(Japan) Moto Hayashi	21–19, 21–12	(gold) Winner
2017	Singapore Youth International	(Singapore) Jaslyn Hooi	21–17, 21–7	(gold) Winner
2018	German Junior International	(China) Zhou Meng	22–20, 27–25	(gold) Winner
2018	Banthongyord Junior International	(China) Wang Zhiyi	19–21, 16–21	(silver) Runner-up
2019	Banthongyord Junior International	(China) Zhou Meng	23–21, 22–20	(gold) Winner

Girls' doubles
Year	Tournament	Partner	Opponent	Score	Result
2015	Russian Junior International	(Thailand) Supamart Mingchua	(Thailand) Ruethaichanok Laisuan (Thailand) Kilasu Ostermeyer	17–21, 14–21	(silver) Runner-up

Mixed doubles
Year	Tournament	Partner	Opponent	Score	Result
2018	Banthongyord Junior International	(Thailand) Kunlavut Vitidsarn	(Japan) Hiroki Midorikawa (Japan) Natsu Saito	23–21, 21–18	(gold) Winner
2019	Banthongyord Junior International	(Thailand) Kunlavut Vitidsarn	(China) Di Zijian (China) Li Yijing	21–11, 21–17	(gold) Winner

BWF Junior International Grand Prix tournament
BWF Junior International Challenge tournament
BWF Junior International Series tournament
BWF Junior Future Series tournament

== Record against selected opponents ==
Record against Year-end Finals finalists, World Championships semifinalists, and Olympic quarterfinalists. Accurate as of 28 November 2022.

Players	Matches	Results		Difference
Players	Matches	Won	Lost	Difference
(China) Chen Yufei	3	0	3	–3
(China) He Bingjiao	2	0	2	–2
(China) Zhang Yiman	2	1	1	0
(India) Saina Nehwal	2	1	1	0
(India) P. V. Sindhu	1	0	1	–1
(Japan) Nozomi Okuhara	3	1	2	–1

Players	Matches	Results		Difference
Players	Matches	Won	Lost	Difference
(Japan) Akane Yamaguchi	2	0	2	–2
(South Korea) An Se-young	7	2	5	–3
(South Korea) Sung Ji-hyun	1	1	0	+1
(Spain) Carolina Marín	2	0	2	–2
(Thailand) Porntip Buranaprasertsuk	1	1	0	+1
(Thailand) Ratchanok Intanon	3	2	1	+1
