= 2020 Badminton Asia Team Championships =

Badminton championships

Tournament details
- Dates: 11–16 February
- Edition: 3
- Venue: Rizal Memorial Coliseum
- Location: Manila, Philippines

Champions
- Men's teams: Indonesia
- Women's teams: Japan

The 2020 Badminton Asia Team Championships (also known as the 2020 Smart Badminton Asia Manila Team Championship due to sponsorship reasons) was the third edition of Badminton Asia Team Championships, staged at the Rizal Memorial Coliseum in Manila, Philippines, from 11 to 16 February 2020. This championships was organized by the Badminton Asia with Philippine Badminton Association as host organiser and sanctioned by the Badminton World Federation. This tournament served as the Asian qualifiers for the 2020 Thomas & Uber Cup in Denmark. Competitors could also accumulate points as part of qualification process for 2020 Summer Olympics badminton tournament in Tokyo. Indonesia and Japan were the defending champions on men's and women's category respectively. They both successfully defended their title.

== Background ==
The 2020 Badminton Asia Team Championships officially crowned the best male and female national badminton teams in Asia and at the same time served as the Asian qualification event towards the 2020 Thomas & Uber Cup finals. Twenty-four teams, consisting of 12 men's teams and 12 women's teams entered the tournament. China and Hong Kong withdrew from the tournament due to the Philippine government's ban on foreigners regardless of nationality from visiting the host country from China due to concerns over the COVID-19 pandemic.

=== Competition format ===
The competition begins with a group stage: all participating teams are divided into four groups of two or three teams each. Each team plays each other once, with the top two teams advancing to the knockout stage. A match is won by the team that first wins three games. The eight teams that qualify will be drawn and compete in a knockout format until the final.

Tie-breaker

Team ranking within a group is determined based on the following criteria: number of wins; match difference; game difference; and points difference. If two teams are tied after a criterion is applied, the winner of the match between the two teams will be ranked higher. A draw will be held to determine ranking if there are still teams tied after all criteria are applied.

=== Hosting ===
On 10 January 2020, Badminton Asia announced that the Philippines were set to host the Badminton Asia Team Championships in Manila and will be using the Rizal Memorial Coliseum as the venue for the entire tournament.

== Schedule ==
Day, Date	Time	Phase
Tuesday, 11 February	10:00	Group Stage
Tuesday, 11 February	16:00	Group Stage
Wednesday, 12 February	10:00	Group Stage
Wednesday, 12 February	16:00	Group Stage
Thursday, 13 February	10:00	Group Stage
Thursday, 13 February	16:00	Group Stage
Friday, 14 February	10:00	Quarter-finals
Friday, 14 February	16:00	Quarter-finals
Saturday, 15 February	10:00	Semi-finals
Saturday, 15 February	16:00	Semi-finals
Sunday, 26 February	10:00	Finals
Sunday, 26 February	16:00	Finals
Note: All times are in Philippines Standard Time (UTC+08:00)

== Teams ==
The tournament will feature 10 teams competing in the men's category and 9 teams in the women's category.

Nation	Men's	Women's	Nation	Men's	Women's
Chinese Taipei	Yes	Yes	Malaysia	Yes	Yes
India	Yes	—N/a	Philippines	Yes	Yes
Indonesia	Yes	Yes	Singapore	Yes	Yes
Japan	Yes	Yes	South Korea	Yes	Yes
Kazakhstan	Yes	Yes	Thailand	Yes	Yes

== Draw ==
=== Seedings ===
The seeding was based on team ranking on 21 January 2020.

- Men's team
1. Indonesia
2. Japan
3. China
4. Chinese Taipei
5. India
6. Malaysia
7. South Korea
8. Thailand
- Women's team
1. Japan
2. China
3. South Korea
4. Thailand
5. Indonesia
6. Chinese Taipei
7. India
8. Malaysia

=== Drawn groups ===
The draw was held on 29 January 2020, at the Century Park Hotel in Manila. Both men's and women's team group stage consist of four groups with three teams.

However, due to the withdrawal of China and Hong Kong, the men's tournament groups were re-drawn on 10 February 2020. No redrawing was made for the women's tournament despite the withdrawal of India.

- Men's team

Group A	Group B	Group C	Group D
Indonesia (1); South Korea (7)	India (5); Malaysia (6); Kazakhstan	Chinese Taipei (4); Singapore; Philippines	Japan (2); Thailand (8)

- Women's team

Group W	Group X	Group Y	Group Z
Japan (1); Malaysia (8)	South Korea (3); Kazakhstan	Thailand (4); Indonesia (5); Philippines	Chinese Taipei (6); Singapore

== Medal summary ==
=== Medal table ===
* Host nation (Philippines)

Rank	Nation	Gold	Silver	Bronze	Total
1	Japan	1	0	1	2
2	Indonesia	1	0	0	1
3	Malaysia	0	1	1	2
4	South Korea	0	1	0	1
5	India	0	0	1	1
5	Thailand	0	0	1	1
Totals (6 entries)		2	2	4	8

=== Medalists ===
Event	Gold	Silver	Bronze
Men's team	Indonesia; Mohammad Ahsan; Fajar Alfian; Muhammad Rian Ardianto; Jonatan Christie; Marcus Fernaldi Gideon; Anthony Sinisuka Ginting; Firman Abdul Kholik; Shesar Hiren Rhustavito; Hendra Setiawan; Kevin Sanjaya Sukamuljo	Malaysia; Cheam June Wei; Aaron Chia; Goh Sze Fei; Nur Izzuddin; Lee Zii Jia; Leong Jun Hao; Ng Tze Yong; Ong Yew Sin; Soh Wooi Yik; Teo Ee Yi	India; Arjun M.R. Subhankar Dey; Dhruv Kapila; Srikanth Kidambi; Prannoy Kumar; Satwiksairaj Rankireddy; B. Sai Praneeth; Lakshya Sen; Chirag Shetty
Men's team	Indonesia; Mohammad Ahsan; Fajar Alfian; Muhammad Rian Ardianto; Jonatan Christie; Marcus Fernaldi Gideon; Anthony Sinisuka Ginting; Firman Abdul Kholik; Shesar Hiren Rhustavito; Hendra Setiawan; Kevin Sanjaya Sukamuljo	Malaysia; Cheam June Wei; Aaron Chia; Goh Sze Fei; Nur Izzuddin; Lee Zii Jia; Leong Jun Hao; Ng Tze Yong; Ong Yew Sin; Soh Wooi Yik; Teo Ee Yi	Japan; Hiroyuki Endo; Takuro Hoki; Yugo Kobayashi; Akira Koga; Kodai Naraoka; Kenta Nishimoto; Taichi Saito; Kanta Tsuneyama; Koki Watanabe; Yuta Watanabe
Women's team	Japan; Yuki Fukushima; Akane Yamaguchi; Sayaka Takahashi; Mayu Matsumoto; Aya Ohori; Sayaka Hirota; Wakana Nagahara; Nami Matsuyama; Chiharu Shida; Riko Gunji	South Korea; An Se-young; Lee So-hee; Shin Seung-chan; Sung Ji-hyun; Kim So-yeong; Kong Hee-yong; Kim Ga-eun; Sim Yu-jin; Chang Ye-na; Kim Hye-rin	Malaysia; Soniia Cheah Su Ya; Chow Mei Kuan; Eoon Qi Xuan; Goh Jin Wei; Vivian Hoo Kah Mun; Kisona Selvaduray; Lee Meng Yean; Pearly Tan Koong Le; Thinaah Muralitharan; Yap Cheng Wen
Women's team	Japan; Yuki Fukushima; Akane Yamaguchi; Sayaka Takahashi; Mayu Matsumoto; Aya Ohori; Sayaka Hirota; Wakana Nagahara; Nami Matsuyama; Chiharu Shida; Riko Gunji	South Korea; An Se-young; Lee So-hee; Shin Seung-chan; Sung Ji-hyun; Kim So-yeong; Kong Hee-yong; Kim Ga-eun; Sim Yu-jin; Chang Ye-na; Kim Hye-rin	Thailand; Busanan Ongbamrungphan; Chasinee Korepap; Chayanit Chaladchalam; Jongkolphan Kititharakul; Nitchaon Jindapol; Phataimas Muenwong; Phittayaporn Chaiwan; Pornpawee Chochuwong; Rawinda Prajongjai; Supanida Katethong
