= 2012 Asian Junior Badminton Championships – Girls singles =

Tournament details
- Dates: 3 – 7 July 2012
- Edition: 15
- Venue: Gimcheon Indoor Stadium
- Location: Gimcheon, South Korea

The Girls' Singles tournament of the 2012 Asian Junior Badminton Championships was held from July 3–7 in Gimcheon, South Korea. The defending champion of the last edition was Sun Yu from China. The first seeded Pusarla Venkata Sindhu of India emerged as the champion after beat the second seeded Nozomi Okuhara of Japan in the finals with the score 18–21, 21–17, 22–20.

== Seeded ==
1. (India) Pusarla Venkata Sindhu (champion)
2. (Japan) Nozomi Okuhara (final)
3. (Thailand) Busanan Ongbumrungphan (semi-final)
4. (Vietnam) Le Thu Huyen (third round)
5. (South Korea) Park So-young (withdrew)
6. (China) Sun Yu (quarter-final)
7. (Thailand) Sarita Suwanakitborihan (second round)
8. (Malaysia) Lim Yin Fun (third round)

== Draw ==
=== Finals ===
Quarterfinals
1	(India) Pusarla Venkata Sindhu	22	21
6	(China) Sun Yu	20	19
3	(Thailand) Busanan Ongbumrungphan	17	21	21
(Chinese Taipei) Lin Ying-chun	21	12	15
(Singapore) Liang Xiaoyu	17	21	13
(Japan) Akane Yamaguchi	21	11	21
(South Korea) Kim Ye-ji	8	5
2	(Japan) Nozomi Okuhara	21	21

Semifinals
1	(India) Pusarla Venkata Sindhu	21	21
3	(Thailand) Busanan Ongbumrungphan	19	16
(Japan) Akane Yamaguchi	19	9
2	(Japan) Nozomi Okuhara	21	21

Final
1	(India) Pusarla Venkata Sindhu	18	21	22
2	(Japan) Nozomi Okuhara	21	17	20

=== Top Half ===
==== Section 1 ====
First round
(Iran) S Aghaei	15	7
(South Korea) Ryu Y-s	21	21
(Singapore) E Chua	11	6
(Indonesia) R Andriani	21	21
(Mongolia) U Khuderbold	3	1
(Chinese Taipei) Yu C-h	21	21

Second round
1	(India) P V Sindhu	21	21
(South Korea) Ryu Y-s	11	13
(Indonesia) R Andriani	14	21	21
(Chinese Taipei) Yu C-h	21	8	14

Third round
1	(India) P V Sindhu	21	21
(Indonesia) R Andriani	10	19

==== Section 2 ====
First round
(Malaysia) Lim C S	17	16
(South Korea) Lee M-j	21	21
(Thailand) M Phattanaphitoon	21	18	21
(Japan) A Ohori	18	21	16
(Sri Lanka) K I Sirimannage	11	21	21
(Vietnam) Le H T	21	19	17

Second round
6	(China) Sun Y	21	23	21
(South Korea) Lee M-j	16	25	18
(Thailand) M Phattanaphitoon	21	21
(Sri Lanka) K I Sirimannage	10	12

Third round
6	(China) Sun Y	21	21
(Thailand) M Phattanaphitoon	13	11

==== Section 3 ====
First round
(Indonesia) R Hartawan	18	23	15
(Malaysia) K Selvaduray	21	21	21
(Hong Kong) Ng W Y	20	19
(Japan) C Hoshi	22	21
(India) R S Gadde	16	19
(China) Fan MY	21	21

Second round
3	(Thailand) B Ongbumrungphan	21	21
(Malaysia) K Selvaduray	15	9
(Japan) C Hoshi	11	21	13
(China) Fan MY	21	17	21

Third round
3	(Thailand) B Ongbumrungphan	21	21
(China) Fan MY	15	12

==== Section 4 ====
First round
(Sri Lanka) S Illangakoon	21	21
(Nepal) S Shrestha	7	10
(Vietnam) Thai V N	21	21
(Singapore) F Seah	12	19
(Uzbekistan) V Mushtakova	8	5
(Chinese Taipei) Lin Y-c	21	21

Second round
5	(South Korea) Park S-y	w	/	o
(Sri Lanka) S Illangakoon
(Vietnam) Thai V N	20	9
(Chinese Taipei) Lin Y-c	22	21

Third round
(Sri Lanka) S Illangakoon	8	9
(Chinese Taipei) Lin Y-c	21	21

=== Bottom Half ===
==== Section 5 ====
First round
(South Korea) Kim H-m	21	21
(Iran) N Torfinezhad	8	8
(Malaysia) Lee Y Y	21	11	14
(Indonesia) S Mapasa	17	21	21
(Singapore) Liang XY	21	21
(Uzbekistan) A Khurshudyan	4	2

Second round
(South Korea) Kim H-m	15	24
(Indonesia) S Mapasa	21	26
(Singapore) Liang XY	21	21
7	(Thailand) S Suwanakitborihan	14	11

Third round
(Indonesia) S Mapasa	21	15	13
(Singapore) Liang XY	15	21	21

==== Section 6 ====
First round
(Sri Lanka) M Fonseka	1	5
(China) Shen YY	21	21
(Japan) A Yamaguchi	21	21
(Kazakhstan) N Ismailova	4	4
(India) R Das	13	21	21
(Hong Kong) Tsang W C	21	11	12

Second round
(China) Shen YY	9	21	17
(Japan) A Yamaguchi	21	15	21
(India) R Das	21	13	6
4	(Vietnam) Le T H	14	21	21

Third round
(Japan) A Yamaguchi	21	21
4	(Vietnam) Le T H	17	17

==== Section 7 ====
First round
(Vietnam) Dinh T P H	w	/	o
(Thailand) P Thawathanakul
(Singapore) Gao YM	10	16
(South Korea) Kim Y-j	21	21
(Mongolia) K Byambaa	w	/o
(Hong Kong) Cheung Y M

Second round
(Thailand) P Thawathanakul	17	21	16
(South Korea) Kim Y-j	21	15	21
(Hong Kong) Cheung Y M	15	21
8	(Malaysia) Lim Y F	21	23

Third round
(South Korea) Kim Y-j	21	21
8	(Malaysia) Lim Y F	16	14

==== Section 8 ====
First round
(Indonesia) H Ramadini	21	21
(India) R Pillai	9	9
(South Korea) Lee J-m	21	21
(Chinese Taipei) Sung S-y	12	18
(China) Chen SY	21	21
(Sri Lanka) O Kuruppu	7	16

Second round
(Indonesia) H Ramadini	16	21	21
(South Korea) Lee J-m	21	10	18
(China) Chen SY	2	9
2	(Japan) N Okuhara	21	21

Third round
(Indonesia) H Ramadini	9	15
2	(Japan) N Okuhara	21	21
