= Badminton at the 2026 Asian Games – Women's singles =

Women's singles at the 2026 Asian Games
- Venue: Ichinomiya City Municipal Gymnasium
- Dates: 25–29 September 2026
- Competitors: 34 from 21 nations

Medalists
gold medal	An Se-young	South Korea
silver medal	Akane Yamaguchi	Japan
bronze medal	Chen Yufei	China
bronze medal	Wang Zhiyi	China

The women's singles badminton tournament at the 2026 Asian Games will be held from 25 to 29 September 2026 at the Ichinomiya City Municipal Gymnasium in Ichinomiya, Japan. An Se-young of South Korea is the defending champion.

== Schedule ==
All times are Japanese Standard Time (UTC+09:00)

Date	Day	Time	Event
25 September	Friday	09:30	Round of 64
25 September	Friday	15:00	Round of 32
26 September	Saturday	09:30	Round of 32
26 September	Saturday	15:00	Round of 16
27 September	Sunday	09:30	Quarter-finals
28 September	Monday	09:30	Semifinals
29 September	Tuesday	11:00	Gold medal match

== Seeds ==
The top eight Asian players were seeded based on the BWF World Rankings published on 25 August 2026.

1. An Se-young (KOR) (champion)
2. Wang Zhiyi (CHN) (semi-finals)
3. Akane Yamaguchi (JPN) (final)
4. Chen Yufei (CHN) (semi-finals)
5. Ratchanok Intanon (THA) (quarter-finals)
6. Putri Kusuma Wardani (INA) (third round)
7. Tomoka Miyazaki (JPN) (third round)
8. Pornpawee Chochuwong (THA) (second round)

== Results ==
=== Elimination Round ===
==== Section 1 ====
Round of 64

Round of 32
1	An S-y (KOR)	21	21
K Smagulova (KAZ)	5	5
R Liyanage (SRI)	21	21
R Sherchan (NEP)	9	6
5	R Intanon (THA)	21	21
Kim J-h (PRK)	14	3
F N Abdul Razzaq (MDV)	9	13
Yeo J M (SGP)	21	21

Round of 16
1	An S-y (KOR)	21	21
R Liyanage (SRI)	9	10
5	R Intanon (THA)	21	21
Yeo J M (SGP)	12	16

Quarter-finals
1	An S-y (KOR)	21	21
5	R Intanon (THA)	8	9

==== Section 2 ====
Round of 64
Chiu P-c (TPE)	21	21
Letshanaa K (MAS)	13	13

Round of 32
4	Chen YF (CHN)	21	21
Liang K W (HKG)	11	15
Nguyễn T L (VIE)	21	21
T R Wiryawan (INA)	15	10
7	T Miyazaki (JPN)	21	21
S Kherlenbaatar (MGL)	5	5
Chiu P-c (TPE)	19	14
P. V. Sindhu (IND)	21	21

Round of 16
4	Chen YF (CHN)	21	22	21
Nguyễn T L (VIE)	10	24	12
7	T Miyazaki (JPN)	9	13
P. V. Sindhu (IND)	21	21

Quarter-finals
4	Chen YF (CHN)	11	21	21
P. V. Sindhu (IND)	21	18	10

==== Section 3 ====
Round of 64
U Hooda (IND)	21	21
Yu M-s (PRK)	9	10

Round of 32
U Hooda (IND)	21	20	21
Wong L C (MAS)	14	22	19
M Shahzad (PAK)	5	11
6	P K Wardani (INA)	21	21
A Zhumabek (KAZ)	9	9
Pui C W (MAC)	21	21
S Shooridehziabari (IRI)	5	9
3	A Yamaguchi (JPN)	21	21

Round of 16
U Hooda (IND)	21	21
6	P K Wardani (INA)	19	13
Pui C W (MAC)	12	12
3	A Yamaguchi (JPN)	21	21

Quarter-finals
U Hooda (IND)	16	21	17
3	A Yamaguchi (JPN)	21	14	21

==== Section 4 ====
Round of 64
E Tselmeg-od (MGL)	8	3
A N Abdul Razzaq (MDV)	21	21

Round of 32
A N Abdul Razzaq (MDV)	2	12
Lo S Y (HKG)	21	21
Lin H-t (TPE)	21	21
8	P Chochuwong (THA)	14	16
U Akter (BAN)	4	5
Kim G-e (KOR)	21	21
R Maharjan (NEP)	4	2
2	Wang ZY (CHN)	21	21

Round of 16
Lo S Y (HKG)	19	21	15
Lin H-t (TPE)	21	7	21
Kim G-e (KOR)	14	6^{r}
2	Wang ZY (CHN)	21	11

Quarter-finals
Lin H-t (TPE)	7	12
2	Wang ZY (CHN)	21	21

=== Finals ===
Semi-finals
1	An Se-young (KOR)	21	21
4	Chen Yufei (CHN)	5	12
3	Akane Yamaguchi (JPN)	21	22
2	Wang Zhiyi (CHN)	11	20

Gold medal match
1	An Se-young (KOR)	21	21
3	Akane Yamaguchi (JPN)	17	9
