= 2019 Indonesia Open (badminton) =

2019 badminton tournament in Jakarta

Tournament details
- Dates: 16–21 July
- Edition: 38th
- Level: Super 1000
- Total prize money: US$1,250,000
- Venue: Istora Gelora Bung Karno
- Location: Jakarta, Indonesia

Champions
- Men's singles: (Chinese Taipei) Chou Tien-chen
- Women's singles: (Japan) Akane Yamaguchi
- Men's doubles: (Indonesia) Marcus Fernaldi Gideon (Indonesia) Kevin Sanjaya Sukamuljo
- Women's doubles: (Japan) Yuki Fukushima (Japan) Sayaka Hirota
- Mixed doubles: (China) Zheng Siwei (China) Huang Yaqiong

The 2019 Indonesia Open (officially known as the BLIBLI Indonesia Open 2019 for sponsorship reasons) was a BWF World Tour 1000 event which took place at the Istora Gelora Bung Karno in Jakarta, Indonesia, from 16 to 21 July 2019. It had a total purse of $1,250,000.

== Tournament ==
The 2019 Indonesia Open was the fourteenth tournament of the 2019 BWF World Tour and also part of the Indonesia Open championships, which has been held since 1982. This tournament was organized by Badminton Association of Indonesia and sanctioned by the BWF.

=== Venue ===
This international tournament was held at the Istora Gelora Bung Karno in Jakarta, Indonesia.

=== Point distribution ===
Below is the point distribution table for each phase of the tournament based on the BWF points system for the BWF World Tour Super 1000 event.

Winner	Runner-up	3/4	5/8	9/16	17/32
12,000	10,200	8,400	6,600	4,800	3,000

=== Prize money ===
The total prize money for this year's tournament was US$1,250,000. Distribution of prize money was in accordance with BWF regulations.

Event	Winner	Finals	Semi-finals	Quarter-finals	Last 16	Last 32
Singles	$87,500	$42,500	$17,500	$6,875	$3,750	$1,250
Doubles	$92,500	$43,750	$17,500	$7,812.50	$4,062.50	$1,250

== Men's singles ==
=== Seeds ===
1. (Japan) Kento Momota (second round)
2. (China) Shi Yuqi (second round)
3. (Denmark) Viktor Axelsen (withdrew)
4. (Chinese Taipei) Chou Tien-chen (champion)
5. (China) Chen Long (second round)
6. (Indonesia) Jonatan Christie (quarter-finals)
7. (Indonesia) Anthony Sinisuka Ginting (second round)
8. (India) Srikanth Kidambi (second round)

=== Finals ===
Semi-finals
(Thailand) Kantaphon Wangcharoen	19	21	16
4	(Chinese Taipei) Chou Tien-chen	21	18	21
PFR	(Hong Kong) Wong Wing Ki	17	10
(Denmark) Anders Antonsen	21	21

Final
4	(Chinese Taipei) Chou Tien-chen	21	24	21
(Denmark) Anders Antonsen	18	26	15

=== Top half ===
==== Section 1 ====
First Round
1	(Japan) K Momota	22	21
(Malaysia) Liew D	20	14
(Netherlands) M Caljouw	12	13
(China) Huang YX	21	21
7	(Indonesia) A S Ginting	20	23	21
(China) Lu GZ	22	21	18
(Thailand) K Wangcharoen	21	19	21
(Japan) K Tsuneyama	19	21	17

Second Round
1	(Japan) K Momota	16	21	18
(China) Huang YX	21	11	21
7	(Indonesia) A S Ginting	20	21	19
(Thailand) K Wangcharoen	22	11	21

Quarter-finals
(China) Huang YX	10	17
(Thailand) K Wangcharoen	21	21

==== Section 2 ====
First Round
4	(Chinese Taipei) Chou T-c	21	21
(Thailand) S Avihingsanon	12	11
(China) Lin D	14	21	21
PFR	(Canada) J Ho-shue	21	16	16
6	(Indonesia) J Christie	21	24
(Denmark) R Gemke	17	22
(Chinese Taipei) Wang T-w	16	18
(Denmark) H-K Vittinghus	21	21

Second Round
4	(Chinese Taipei) Chou T-c	24	17	21
(China) Lin D	22	21	13
6	(Indonesia) J Christie	22	21
(Denmark) H-K Vittinghus	20	13

Quarter-finals
4	(Chinese Taipei) Chou T-c	16	21	21
6	(Indonesia) J Christie	21	18	14

=== Bottom half ===
==== Section 3 ====
First Round
(France) B Leverdez	13	9
(Hong Kong) Ng K L	21	21
(Japan) K Nishimoto	14	13
8	(India) S Kidambi	21	21
PFR	(Indonesia) Y F Mainaky	12	15
(Hong Kong) Lee C Y	21	21
(India) B. S Praneeth	15	21	10
PFR	(Hong Kong) Wong W K	21	13	21

Second Round
(Hong Kong) Ng K L	21	21
8	(India) S Kidambi	17	19
(Hong Kong) Lee C Y	21	10	7
PFR	(Hong Kong) Wong W K	15	21	21

Quarter-finals
(Hong Kong) Ng K L	16	13
PFR	(Hong Kong) Wong W K	21	21

==== Section 4 ====
First Round
(Thailand) K Phetpradab	14	13
(Malaysia) Lee Z J	21	21
(Indonesia) T Sugiarto	20	21	17
5	(China) Chen L	22	14	21
(Thailand) S Thammasin	16	15
(Denmark) A Antonsen	21	21
(India) Prannoy K	21	18	20
2	(China) Shi YQ	19	21	22

Second Round
(Malaysia) Lee Z J	21	19	22
5	(China) Chen L	16	21	20
(Denmark) A Antonsen	7
2	(China) Shi YQ	6^{r}

Quarter-finals
(Malaysia) Lee Z J	16	11
(Denmark) A Antonsen	21	21

== Women's singles ==
=== Seeds ===
1. (Chinese Taipei) Tai Tzu-ying (semi-finals)
2. (China) Chen Yufei (semi-finals)
3. (Japan) Nozomi Okuhara (quarter-finals)
4. (Japan) Akane Yamaguchi (champion)
5. (India) P. V. Sindhu (final)
6. (China) He Bingjiao (second round)
7. (Thailand) Ratchanok Intanon (quarter-finals)
8. (India) Saina Nehwal (withdrew)

=== Finals ===
Semi-finals
1	(Chinese Taipei) Tai Tzu-ying	9	15
4	(Japan) Akane Yamaguchi	21	21
5	(India) P. V. Sindhu	21	21
2	(China) Chen Yufei	19	10

Final
4	(Japan) Akane Yamaguchi	21	21
5	(India) P. V. Sindhu	15	16

=== Top half ===
==== Section 1 ====
First Round
1	(Chinese Taipei) Tai T-y	21	21
(Singapore) Yeo J M	12	18
(Russia) E Kosetskaya	15	16
(Thailand) B Ongbamrungphan	21	21
7	(Thailand) R Intanon	21	21
(Indonesia) R Hartawan	14	14
(Thailand) P Chochuwong	10	8
(Indonesia) G M Tunjung	21	21

Second Round
1	(Chinese Taipei) Tai T-y	21	21
(Thailand) B Ongbamrungphan	19	18
7	(Thailand) R Intanon	13	21	21
(Indonesia) G M Tunjung	21	19	15

Quarter-finals
1	(Chinese Taipei) Tai T-y	21	16	21
7	(Thailand) R Intanon	18	21	12

==== Section 2 ====
First Round
4	(Japan) A Yamaguchi	18	21	21
(China) Li XR	21	10	15
(Denmark) L Kjærsfeldt	21	12	8
(Hong Kong) Cheung N Y	18	21	21
PFR	(England) C Birch	6	15
(Thailand) N Jindapol	21	21
(Canada) M Li	21	14	21
(South Korea) Sung J-h	12	21	17

Second Round
4	(Japan) A Yamaguchi	21	21
(Hong Kong) Cheung N Y	19	15
(Thailand) N Jindapol	22	21
(Canada) M Li	20	13

Quarter-finals
4	(Japan) A Yamaguchi	21	21
(Thailand) N Jindapol	17	14

=== Bottom half ===
==== Section 3 ====
First Round
(Denmark) M Blichfeldt	19	21	21
(Hong Kong) Yip P Y	21	15	17
(Japan) A Ohori	21	15	15
5	(India) P. V. Sindhu	11	21	21
(Malaysia) S Cheah S Y	21	21
(China) Cai YY	8	17
(Hong Kong) Deng X	13	17
3	(Japan) N Okuhara	21	21

Second Round
(Denmark) M Blichfeldt	14	21	11
5	(India) P. V. Sindhu	21	17	21
(Malaysia) S Cheah S Y	7	16
3	(Japan) N Okuhara	21	21

Quarter-finals
5	(India) P. V. Sindhu	21	21
3	(Japan) N Okuhara	14	7

==== Section 4 ====
First Round
(United States) Zhang BW	11	21	21
(Indonesia) L A Mainaky	21	13	9
(China) Chen XX	13	21	17
6	(China) He BJ	21	13	21
(China) Han Y	18	16
(Japan) S Takahashi	21	21
(Indonesia) Fitriani	7	19
2	(China) Chen YF	21	21

Second Round
(United States) Zhang BW	21	15	21
6	(China) He BJ	15	21	18
(Japan) S Takahashi	21	17	12
2	(China) Chen YF	15	21	21

Quarter-finals
(United States) Zhang BW	14	21	16
2	(China) Chen YF	21	17	21

== Men's doubles ==
=== Seeds ===
1. (Indonesia) Marcus Fernaldi Gideon / Kevin Sanjaya Sukamuljo (champions)
2. (Japan) Takeshi Kamura / Keigo Sonoda (second round)
3. (China) Li Junhui / Liu Yuchen (semi-finals)
4. (Indonesia) Mohammad Ahsan / Hendra Setiawan (final)
5. (Japan) Hiroyuki Endo / Yuta Watanabe (quarter-finals)
6. (Indonesia) Fajar Alfian / Muhammad Rian Ardianto (quarter-finals)
7. (China) Han Chengkai / Zhou Haodong (second round)
8. (Denmark) Kim Astrup / Anders Skaarup Rasmussen (withdrew)

=== Finals ===
Semi-finals
1	(Indonesia) Marcus Fernaldi Gideon (Indonesia) Kevin Sanjaya Sukamuljo	21	21
3	(China) Li Junhui (China) Liu Yuchen	9	13
4	(Indonesia) Mohammad Ahsan (Indonesia) Hendra Setiawan	17	21	21
(Japan) Takuro Hoki (Japan) Yugo Kobayashi	21	19	17

Final
1	(Indonesia) Marcus Fernaldi Gideon (Indonesia) Kevin Sanjaya Sukamuljo	21	21
4	(Indonesia) Mohammad Ahsan (Indonesia) Hendra Setiawan	19	16

=== Top half ===
==== Section 1 ====
First Round
1	(Indonesia) M F Gideon (Indonesia) K S Sukamuljo	20	21	21
(Japan) T Inoue (Japan) Y Kaneko	22	16	14
(India) S Rankireddy (India) C Shetty	21	18	21
(Malaysia) Goh S F (Malaysia) N Izzuddin M R	19	21	19
PFR	(South Korea) Choi S-g (South Korea) Seo S-j	17	21	22
(Indonesia) B Angriawan (Indonesia) Hardianto	21	11	20
(Netherlands) J Maas (Netherlands) R Tabeling	17	18
(China) Ou XY (China) Zhang N	21	21

Second Round
1	(Indonesia) M F Gideon (Indonesia) K S Sukamuljo	21	21
(India) S Rankireddy (India) C Shetty	15	14
PFR	(South Korea) Choi S-g (South Korea) Seo S-j	18	18
(China) Ou XY (China) Zhang N	21	21

Quarter-finals
1	(Indonesia) M F Gideon (Indonesia) K S Sukamuljo	21	21
(China) Ou XY (China) Zhang N	12	16

==== Section 2 ====
First Round
3	(China) Li JH (China) Liu YC	19	21	21
(Malaysia) A Chia (Malaysia) Soh W Y	21	15	9
(Chinese Taipei) Lee Y (Chinese Taipei) Wang C-l	19	21	14
(Indonesia) R K Suwardi (Indonesia) A Pratama	21	14	21
7	(China) Han CK (China) Zhou HD	21	15	21
(Chinese Taipei) Lu C-y (Chinese Taipei) Yang P-h	16	21	17
(China) He JT (China) Tan Q	21	21
(China) Di ZJ (China) Wang C	14	18

Second Round
3	(China) Li JH (China) Liu YC	21	21
(Indonesia) R K Suwardi (Indonesia) A Pratama	10	13
7	(China) Han CK (China) Zhou HD	17	18
(China) He JT (China) Tan Q	21	21

Quarter-finals
3	(China) Li JH (China) Liu YC	21	21
(China) He JT (China) Tan Q	17	12

=== Bottom half ===
==== Section 3 ====
First Round
(Malaysia) Chooi K M (Malaysia) Low J S	15	18
(Indonesia) W Nayaka (Indonesia) A Yusuf	21	21
(Malaysia) Ong Y S (Malaysia) Teo E Y	21	15	16
5	(Japan) H Endo (Japan) Y Watanabe	17	21	21
(Germany) M Lamsfuß (Germany) M E Seidel	10	21	27
(Thailand) B Isara (Thailand) M Jongjit	21	13	25
(England) M Ellis (England) C Langridge	26	17
4	(Indonesia) M Ahsan (Indonesia) H Setiawan	28	21

Second Round
(Indonesia) W Nayaka (Indonesia) A Yusuf	17	21	17
5	(Japan) H Endo (Japan) Y Watanabe	21	16	21
(Germany) M Lamsfuß (Germany) M E Seidel	16	17
4	(Indonesia) M Ahsan (Indonesia) H Setiawan	21	21

Quarter-finals
5	(Japan) H Endo (Japan) Y Watanabe	15	21	20
4	(Indonesia) M Ahsan (Indonesia) H Setiawan	21	9	22

==== Section 4 ====
First Round
(Chinese Taipei) Liao M-c (Chinese Taipei) Su C-h	21	21
(India) M Attri (India) B. S Reddy	11	17
(China) Huang KX (China) Liu C	21	14	16
6	(Indonesia) F Alfian (Indonesia) M R Ardianto	18	21	21
(Japan) T Hoki (Japan) Y Kobayashi	21	21
(Canada) J Ho-shue (Canada) N Yakura	9	12
(Malaysia) Goh V S (Malaysia) Tan W K	21	19	14
2	(Japan) T Kamura (Japan) K Sonoda	17	21	21

Second Round
(Chinese Taipei) Liao M-c (Chinese Taipei) Su C-h	12	11
6	(Indonesia) F Alfian (Indonesia) M R Ardianto	21	21
(Japan) T Hoki (Japan) Y Kobayashi	21	21
2	(Japan) T Kamura (Japan) K Sonoda	14	15

Quarter-finals
6	(Indonesia) F Alfian (Indonesia) M R Ardianto	19	12
(Japan) T Hoki (Japan) Y Kobayashi	21	21

== Women's doubles ==
=== Seeds ===
1. (Japan) Mayu Matsumoto / Wakana Nagahara (quarter-finals)
2. (Japan) Yuki Fukushima / Sayaka Hirota (champions)
3. (Japan) Misaki Matsutomo / Ayaka Takahashi (final)
4. (China) Chen Qingchen / Jia Yifan (semi-finals)
5. (Indonesia) Greysia Polii / Apriyani Rahayu (second round)
6. (South Korea) Lee So-hee / Shin Seung-chan (semi-finals)
7. (Japan) Shiho Tanaka / Koharu Yonemoto (quarter-finals)
8. (China) Du Yue / Li Yinhui (quarter-finals)

=== Finals ===
Semi-finals
6	(South Korea) Lee So-hee (South Korea) Shin Seung-chan	21	14	15
3	(Japan) Misaki Matsutomo (Japan) Ayaka Takahashi	17	21	21
4	(China) Chen Qingchen (China) Jia Yifan	14	12
2	(Japan) Yuki Fukushima (Japan) Sayaka Hirota	21	21

Final
3	(Japan) Misaki Matsutomo (Japan) Ayaka Takahashi	16	18
2	(Japan) Yuki Fukushima (Japan) Sayaka Hirota	21	21

=== Top half ===
==== Section 1 ====
First Round
1	(Japan) M Matsumoto (Japan) W Nagahara	21	21
(Canada) R Honderich (Canada) K Tsai	12	18
(Australia) S Mapasa (Australia) G Somerville	15	20
(Indonesia) N Melati (Indonesia) T R Nuraidah	21	22
6	(South Korea) Lee S-h (South Korea) Shin S-c	21	21
(Denmark) M Fruergaard (Denmark) S Thygesen	18	12
(Malaysia) V Hoo K M (Malaysia) Yap C W	22	20	22
(India) A Ponnappa (India) N. S Reddy	20	22	20

Second Round
1	(Japan) M Matsumoto (Japan) W Nagahara	21	21
(Indonesia) N Melati (Indonesia) T R Nuraidah	12	17
6	(South Korea) Lee S-h (South Korea) Shin S-c	19	21	21
(Malaysia) V Hoo K M (Malaysia) Yap C W	21	12	10

Quarter-finals
1	(Japan) M Matsumoto (Japan) W Nagahara	13	11
6	(South Korea) Lee S-h (South Korea) Shin S-c	21	21

==== Section 2 ====
First Round
3	(Japan) M Matsutomo (Japan) A Takahashi	21	21
(Germany) L Efler (Germany) I Herttrich	17	8
(Malaysia) Chow M K (Malaysia) Lee M Y	21	21
(Indonesia) Y Barkah (Indonesia) J F Sugiarto	16	16
5	(Indonesia) G Polii (Indonesia) A Rahayu	21	21
(Japan) A Sakuramoto (Japan) Y Takahata	15	16
(Thailand) J Kititharakul (Thailand) R Prajongjai	18	19
(South Korea) Kim S-y (South Korea) Kong H-y	21	21

Second Round
3	(Japan) M Matsutomo (Japan) A Takahashi	21	21
(Malaysia) Chow M K (Malaysia) Lee M Y	13	12
5	(Indonesia) G Polii (Indonesia) A Rahayu	20	21	13
(South Korea) Kim S-y (South Korea) Kong H-y	22	18	21

Quarter-finals
3	(Japan) M Matsutomo (Japan) A Takahashi	21	21
(South Korea) Kim S-y (South Korea) Kong H-y	17	9

=== Bottom half ===
==== Section 3 ====
First Round
(Chinese Taipei) Chang C-h (Chinese Taipei) Yang C-t	7	11
(China) Dong WJ (China) Feng XY	21	21
(Russia) E Bolotova (Russia) A Davletova	13	14
8	(China) Du Y (China) Li YH	21	21
(Indonesia) D D Haris (Indonesia) R A Pradipta	14	21	21
(China) Li WM (China) Zheng Y	21	13	18
PFR	(Indonesia) M I Cindiani (Indonesia) V A Sukoco	16	9
4	(China) Chen QC (China) Jia YF	21	21

Second Round
(China) Dong WJ (China) Feng XY	11	21	14
8	(China) Du Y (China) Li YH	21	17	21
(Indonesia) D D Haris (Indonesia) R A Pradipta	15	14
4	(China) Chen QC (China) Jia YF	21	21

Quarter-finals
8	(China) Du Y (China) Li YH	17	14
4	(China) Chen QC (China) Jia YF	21	21

==== Section 4 ====
First Round
(Thailand) P Supajirakul (Thailand) S Taerattanachai	21	21
(England) C Birch (England) L Smith	17	19
(Chinese Taipei) Hsu Y-c (Chinese Taipei) Hu L-f	17	15
7	(Japan) S Tanaka (Japan) K Yonemoto	21	21
(Indonesia) A Imanuela (Indonesia) V Putri	21	14	7
(China) Liu XX (China) Xia YT	7	21	21
(Netherlands) S Piek (Netherlands) C Seinen	21	11	11
2	(Japan) Y Fukushima (Japan) S Hirota	13	21	21

Second Round
(Thailand) P Supajirakul (Thailand) S Taerattanachai	12	13
7	(Japan) S Tanaka (Japan) K Yonemoto	21	21
(China) Liu XX (China) Xia YT	12	14
2	(Japan) Y Fukushima (Japan) S Hirota	21	21

Quarter-finals
7	(Japan) S Tanaka (Japan) K Yonemoto	21	16	17
2	(Japan) Y Fukushima (Japan) S Hirota	12	21	21

== Mixed doubles ==
=== Seeds ===
1. (China) Zheng Siwei / Huang Yaqiong (champions)
2. (China) Wang Yilyu / Huang Dongping (final)
3. (Japan) Yuta Watanabe / Arisa Higashino (first round)
4. (Thailand) Dechapol Puavaranukroh / Sapsiree Taerattanachai (first round)
5. (Malaysia) Chan Peng Soon / Goh Liu Ying (semi-finals)
6. (Indonesia) Hafiz Faizal / Gloria Emanuelle Widjaja (second round)
7. (Indonesia) Praveen Jordan / Melati Daeva Oktavianti (first round)
8. (Hong Kong) Tang Chun Man / Tse Ying Suet (second round)

=== Finals ===
Semi-finals
1	(China) Zheng Siwei (China) Huang Yaqiong	21	21
(Malaysia) Tan Kian Meng (Malaysia) Lai Pei Jing	12	16
5	(Malaysia) Chan Peng Soon (Malaysia) Goh Liu Ying	13	20
2	(China) Wang Yilyu (China) Huang Dongping	21	22

Final
1	(China) Zheng Siwei (China) Huang Yaqiong	21	21
2	(China) Wang Yilyu (China) Huang Dongping	13	18

=== Top half ===
==== Section 1 ====
First Round
1	(China) Zheng SW (China) Huang YQ	21	21
(China) He JT (China) Du Y	19	8
(India) P Chopra (India) N. S Reddy	25	16	21
(Netherlands) R Tabeling (Netherlands) S Piek	23	21	19
7	(Indonesia) P Jordan (Indonesia) M D Oktavianti	20	14
(Germany) M Lamsfuß (Germany) I Herttrich	22	21
(Germany) M E Seidel (Germany) L Efler	8	10
(England) M Ellis (England) L Smith	21	21

Second Round
1	(China) Zheng SW (China) Huang YQ	21	21
(India) P Chopra (India) N. S Reddy	14	11
(Germany) M Lamsfuß (Germany) I Herttrich	18	18
(England) M Ellis (England) L Smith	21	21

Quarter-finals
1	(China) Zheng SW (China) Huang YQ	21	21
(England) M Ellis (England) L Smith	12	13

==== Section 2 ====
First Round
3	(Japan) Y Watanabe (Japan) A Higashino	6^{r}
(England) C Adcock (England) G Adcock	11
(Russia) R Alimov (Russia) A Davletova
(Republic of Ireland) S Magee (Republic of Ireland) C Magee	w	/	o
8	(Hong Kong) Tang C M (Hong Kong) Tse Y S	22	21
(Japan) T Hoki (Japan) W Nagahara	20	17
(China) Lu K (China) Chen L	21	13
(Malaysia) Tan K M (Malaysia) Lai P J	23	21

Second Round
(England) C Adcock (England) G Adcock	21	21
(Republic of Ireland) S Magee (Republic of Ireland) C Magee	17	16
8	(Hong Kong) Tang C M (Hong Kong) Tse Y S	15	14
(Malaysia) Tan K M (Malaysia) Lai P J	21	21

Quarter-finals
(England) C Adcock (England) G Adcock	15	21	15
(Malaysia) Tan K M (Malaysia) Lai P J	21	14	21

=== Bottom half ===
==== Section 3 ====
First Round
(South Korea) Seo S-j (South Korea) Chae Y-j	21	17	23
(Japan) Y Kaneko (Japan) M Matsutomo	12	21	21
(Indonesia) R Alexander (Indonesia) A Saufika	21	7	11
5	(Malaysia) Chan P S (Malaysia) Goh L Y	16	21	21
(Indonesia) T Ahmad (Indonesia) W O Kandow	21	21
(India) S Rankireddy (India) A Ponnappa	13	11
(Thailand) N Phuangphuapet (Thailand) S Amitrapai	13	21	21
4	(Thailand) D Puavaranukroh (Thailand) S Taerattanachai	21	19	19

Second Round
(South Korea) Seo S-j (South Korea) Chae Y-j	19	15
5	(Malaysia) Chan P S (Malaysia) Goh L Y	21	21
(Indonesia) T Ahmad (Indonesia) W O Kandow	21	21
(Thailand) N Phuangphuapet (Thailand) S Amitrapai	14	18

Quarter-finals
5	(Malaysia) Chan P S (Malaysia) Goh L Y	21	14	21
(Indonesia) T Ahmad (Indonesia) W O Kandow	11	21	14

==== Section 4 ====
First Round
(Malaysia) Goh S H (Malaysia) S J Lai	21	21
(Japan) K Gondo (Japan) A Kurihara	12	8
(Indonesia) R Rivaldy (Indonesia) P H Mentari	24	20	15
6	(Indonesia) H Faizal (Indonesia) G E Widjaja	22	22	21
(Indonesia) A E Prasetya (Indonesia) M G Islami	14	21	19
(China) Ou XY (China) Feng XY	21	7	21
(Chinese Taipei) Wang C-l (Chinese Taipei) Cheng C-y	4^{r}
2	(China) Wang YL (China) Huang DP	11

Second Round
(Malaysia) Goh S H (Malaysia) S J Lai	21	21
6	(Indonesia) H Faizal (Indonesia) G E Widjaja	15	18
(China) Ou XY (China) Feng XY	14	17
2	(China) Wang YL (China) Huang DP	21	21

Quarter-finals
(Malaysia) Goh S H (Malaysia) S J Lai	4	15
2	(China) Wang YL (China) Huang DP	21	21

Preceded by 2019 Russian Open	BWF World Tour; 2019 BWF season	Succeeded by 2019 Japan Open
