= 2014 Asian Junior Badminton Championships – Girls singles =

Tournament details
- Dates: 19 – 23 February 2014
- Edition: 17
- Venue: Taipei Gymnasium
- Location: Taipei, Taiwan

The Girls' Singles tournament of the 2014 Asian Junior Badminton Championships was held from February 19–23 in Taipei, Taiwan. The defending champions of the last edition was Aya Ohori from Japan. Ohori competed in this event as the first seeds, but she was beaten by the eventual silver medalist Chen Yufei from China in the third round. Akane Yamaguchi of Japan claim the title after beat Chen in the final with the score 21–10, 21–15. The second and fifth seeded Busanan Ongbumrungpan of Thailand and Liang Xiaoyu of Singapore finished in the semi-finals round, settle for the bronze medal.

== Seeded ==
1. (Japan) Aya Ohori (third round)
2. (Thailand) Busanan Ongbumrungpan (semi-final)
3. (China) He Bingjiao (quarter-final)
4. (Japan) Akane Yamaguchi (champion)
5. (Singapore) Liang Xiaoyu (semi-final)
6. (India) Ruthvika Shivani (third round)
7. (China) Qin Jinjing (quarter-final)
8. (Thailand) Pornpawee Chochuwong (third round)

== Draw ==
=== Finals ===
Quarterfinals
(China) Chen Yufei	21	21
(South Korea) Kim Ga-eun	18	17
3	(China) He Bingjiao	17	21	14
5	(Singapore) Liang Xiaoyu	21	11	21
7	(China) Qin Jinjing	16	21	18
4	(Japan) Akane Yamaguchi	21	17	21
(Malaysia) Kisona Selvaduray	5	10
2	(Thailand) Busanan Ongbumrungpan	21	21

Semifinals
(China) Chen Yufei	21	21
5	(Singapore) Liang Xiaoyu	10	14
4	(Japan) Akane Yamaguchi	16	21	21
2	(Thailand) Busanan Ongbumrungpan	21	8	14

Final
(China) Chen Yufei	10	15
4	(Japan) Akane Yamaguchi	21	21

=== Top Half ===
==== Section 1 ====
First Round
1	(Japan) A Ohori
BYE
(India) R Karthik	21	21
(Singapore) Tan AN	19	15
(China) Chen YF
BYE
(Malaysia) Ho YM	21	14	24
(South Korea) Kim H-i	18	21	22

Second Round
1	(Japan) A Ohori	21	21
(India) R Karthik	9	6
(China) Chen YF	21	21
(Malaysia) Ho YM	17	19

Third Round
1	(Japan) A Ohori	10	21	15
(China) Chen YF	21	13	21

==== Section 2 ====
First Round
8	(Thailand) P Chochuwong
BYE
(Philippines) A Geverjuan	11	7
(Chinese Taipei) Liang T-y	21	21
(South Korea) Kim G-e	21	21
(Kazakhstan) A Dzyuba	2	5
(Japan) N Nidaira	21	21
(Indonesia) Fitriani	17	7

Second Round
8	(Thailand) P Chochuwong	21	21
(Chinese Taipei) Liang T-y	13	9
(South Korea) Kim G-e	21	21
(Japan) N Nidaira	10	13

Third Round
8	(Thailand) P Chochuwong	21	16	17
(South Korea) Kim G-e	18	21	21

==== Section 3 ====
First Round
3	(China) He BJ
BYE
(Indonesia) V Rumate	10	10
(India) R Das	21	21
(Hong Kong) Yeung SY	21	21
(Macau) Gong XX	5	8
(Japan) R Kawashima	21	21
(Chinese Taipei) Li M-h	12	12

Second Round
3	(China) He BJ	21	21
(India) R Das	12	12
(Hong Kong) Yeung SY	10	9
(Japan) R Kawashima	21	21

Third Round
3	(China) He BJ	21	21
(Japan) R Kawashima	13	13

==== Section 4 ====
First Round
5	(Singapore) Liang XY
BYE
(Singapore) G Chua	11	19
(Malaysia) Goh JW	21	21
(Philippines) S Barredo	13	10
(Chinese Taipei) Lee C-h	21	21
(South Korea) Ki B-h	21	21
(Uzbekistan) A Khurshudyan	6	2

Second Round
5	(Singapore) Liang XY	21	21
(Malaysia) Goh JW	6	15
(Chinese Taipei) Lee C-h	21	21
(South Korea) Ki B-h	9	13

Third Round
5	(Singapore) Liang XY	26	21
(Chinese Taipei) Lee C-h	24	10

=== Bottom Half ===
==== Section 5 ====
First Round
(Chinese Taipei) Chen S-y	17	21	20
(Malaysia) Lee YY	21	14	22
(Hong Kong) Fan KY	19	25	15
(Chinese Taipei) Chang Y-c	21	23	21
(South Korea) Yoon M-a	11	21	15
(India) R Devasthale	21	18	21
BYE
7	(China) Qin JJ

Second Round
(Malaysia) Lee YY	21	21
(Chinese Taipei) Chang Y-c	16	14
(India) R Devasthale	7	8
7	(China) Qin JJ	21	21

Third Round
(Malaysia) Lee YY	8	6
7	(China) Qin JJ	21	21

==== Section 6 ====
First Round
(Hong Kong) Ng TY	21	21
(Uzbekistan) M Pakina	10	5
(Singapore) Yeo JM	16	19
(Thailand) T Poopradubsil	21	21
(Indonesia) R Hartawan	21	21
(Sri Lanka) N Hewage	1	7
BYE
4	(Japan) A Yamaguchi

Second Round
(Hong Kong) Ng TY	17	18
(Thailand) T Poopradubsil	21	21
(Indonesia) R Hartawan	14	21	14
4	(Japan) A Yamaguchi	21	17	21

Third Round
(Thailand) T Poopradubsil	14	8
4	(Japan) A Yamaguchi	21	21

==== Section 7 ====
First Round
(Malaysia) K Selvaduray	21	21
(Sri Lanka) K Waduthantri	8	7
(Philippines) M Sevilla	6	13
(China) Wang XY	21	21
(Sri Lanka) L Geeganage	23	21
(Macau) Wong KI	21	16
BYE
6	(India) R Shivani

Second Round
(Malaysia) K Selvaduray	21	20	21
(China) Wang XY	13	22	14
(Sri Lanka) L Geeganage	4	8
6	(India) R Shivani	21	21

Third Round
(Malaysia) K Selvaduray	21	22
6	(India) R Shivani	11	20

==== Section 8 ====
First Round
(Philippines) A Albo	21	15	14
(Indonesia) G Mariska	18	21	21
BYE
(Thailand) D Ruhakarn
(Chinese Taipei) Sung S-y	21	21
(Hong Kong) Wu YT	9	16
BYE
2	(Thailand) B Ongbumrungpan

Second Round
(Indonesia) G Mariska	21	21
(Thailand) D Ruhakarn	11	16
(Chinese Taipei) Sung S-y	11	9
2	(Thailand) B Ongbumrungpan	21	21

Third Round
(Indonesia) G Mariska	21	17	20
2	(Thailand) B Ongbumrungpan	19	21	22
