= Akane Yamaguchi =

Japanese badminton player (born 1997)

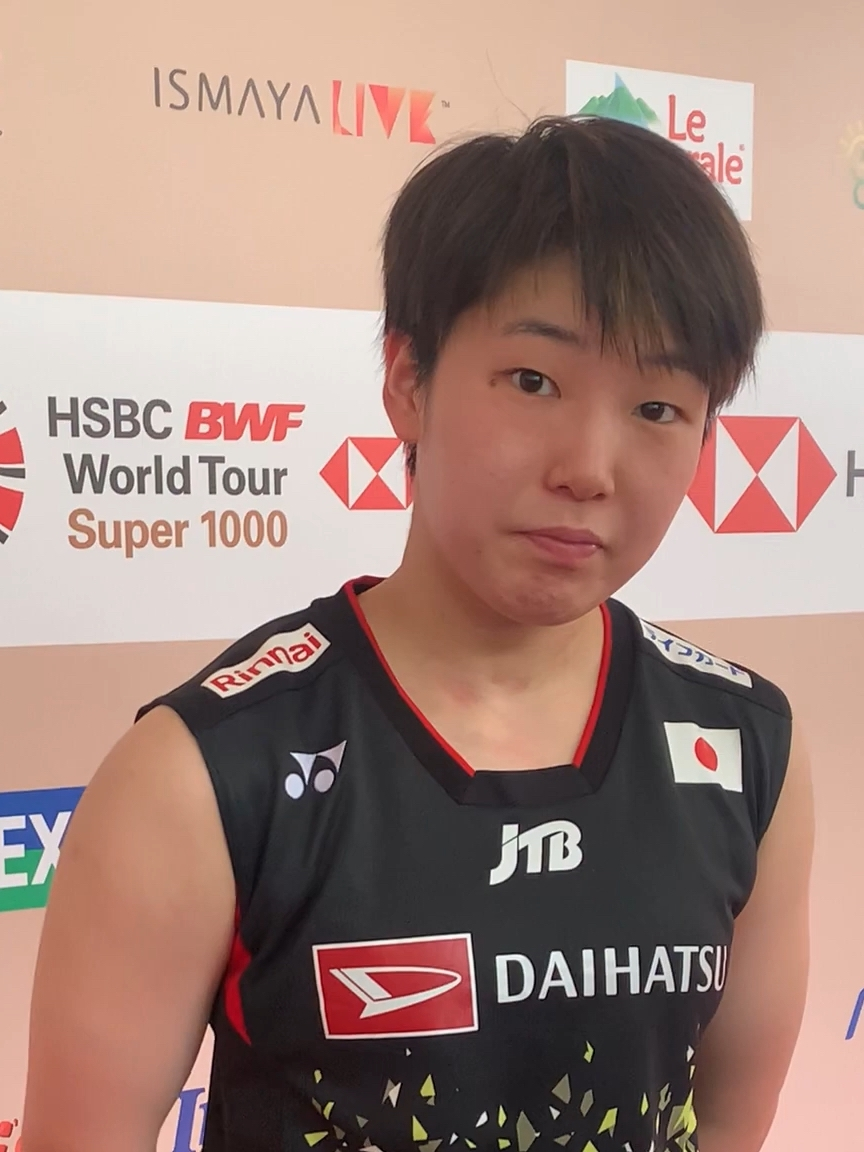
- Yamaguchi in 2023

Personal information
- Born: 6 June 1997 (age 29) Katsuyama, Fukui, Japan
- Years active: 2012–present
- Height: 1.56 m (5 ft 1 in)
- Weight: 55 kg (121 lb)

Sport
- Country: Japan
- Sport: Badminton
- Handedness: Right

Women's singles
- Career record: 564 wins, 178 losses
- Highest ranking: 1 (19 April 2018)
- Current ranking: 2 (27 October 2026)
- BWF profile
Medal record
Women's badminton
Representing Japan
World Championships
Gold medal – first place	2021 Huelva	Women's singles
Gold medal – first place	2022 Tokyo	Women's singles
Gold medal – first place	2025 Paris	Women's singles
Silver medal – second place	2026 New Delhi	Women's singles
Bronze medal – third place	2018 Nanjing	Women's singles
Bronze medal – third place	2023 Copenhagen	Women's singles
Sudirman Cup
Silver medal – second place	2015 Dongguan	Mixed team
Silver medal – second place	2019 Nanning	Mixed team
Silver medal – second place	2021 Vantaa	Mixed team
Bronze medal – third place	2017 Gold Coast	Mixed team
Bronze medal – third place	2023 Suzhou	Mixed team
Bronze medal – third place	2025 Xiamen	Mixed team
Uber Cup
Gold medal – first place	2018 Bangkok	Women's team
Silver medal – second place	2014 New Delhi	Women's team
Silver medal – second place	2020 Aarhus	Women's team
Bronze medal – third place	2016 Kunshan	Women's team
Bronze medal – third place	2022 Bangkok	Women's team
Bronze medal – third place	2024 Chengdu	Women's team
Bronze medal – third place	2026 Horsens	Women's team
Asian Games
Gold medal – first place	2018 Jakarta–Palembang	Women's team
Silver medal – second place	2026 Aichi–Nagoya	Women's singles
Silver medal – second place	2026 Aichi–Nagoya	Women's team
Bronze medal – third place	2014 Incheon	Women's team
Bronze medal – third place	2018 Jakarta–Palembang	Women's singles
Bronze medal – third place	2022 Hangzhou	Women's team
Asian Championships
Gold medal – first place	2019 Wuhan	Women's singles
Silver medal – second place	2017 Wuhan	Women's singles
Silver medal – second place	2022 Manila	Women's singles
Bronze medal – third place	2023 Dubai	Women's singles
Bronze medal – third place	2026 Ningbo	Women's singles
Asia Mixed Team Championships
Gold medal – first place	2017 Ho Chi Minh	Mixed team
Asia Team Championships
Gold medal – first place	2018 Alor Setar	Women's team
Gold medal – first place	2020 Manila	Women's team
East Asian Games
Bronze medal – third place	2013 Tianjin	Women's singles
Bronze medal – third place	2013 Tianjin	Women's team
Youth Olympic Games
Silver medal – second place	2014 Nanjing	Girls' singles
World Junior Championships
Gold medal – first place	2013 Bangkok	Girls' singles
Gold medal – first place	2014 Alor Setar	Girls' singles
Silver medal – second place	2012 Chiba	Girls' singles
Silver medal – second place	2012 Chiba	Mixed team
Bronze medal – third place	2014 Alor Setar	Mixed team
Asian Youth Games
Gold medal – first place	2013 Nanjing	Mixed doubles
Asian Junior Championships
Gold medal – first place	2012 Gimcheon	Mixed team
Gold medal – first place	2014 Taipei	Girls' singles
Bronze medal – third place	2012 Gimcheon	Girls' singles
Bronze medal – third place	2013 Kota Kinabalu	Mixed team
Bronze medal – third place	2014 Taipei	Mixed team

Akane Yamaguchi (山口茜, Yamaguchi Akane; born 6 June 1997) is a Japanese badminton player who competes in women's singles. A former world number one, she became the first Japanese singles player to reach the top ranking on 19 April 2018. Yamaguchi is a three-time World Champion, winning the title in 2021, 2022 and 2025. This makes her the first Japanese player in any discipline to win three world titles. She also won the silver medal at the 2026 Asian Games. Her other major individual tournament victories include the All England Open, the Asian Championships, and the season-ending BWF World Tour Finals.

At the junior level, she won back-to-back World Junior Championships in 2013 and 2014. While still a junior player, she also transitioned to the senior circuit and became the youngest player to win a BWF Super Series tournament at the 2013 Japan Open.

In team events, Yamaguchi was part of the squads that won gold at the 2018 Asian Games, the 2018 Uber Cup, the 2017 Asia Mixed Team Championships, and the 2018 and 2020 Asia Team Championships. Earlier in her career, she was named the BWF Most Promising Player of the Year in both 2013 and 2014, and she later received the BWF Female Player of the Year award in 2022.

== Early life and junior career ==
Akane Yamaguchi was born in Katsuyama, Fukui, Japan, on 6 June 1997. The youngest of three children, she was introduced to badminton by her two older brothers and first held a racquet at age three. She began playing competitively at five, coached by her father at the local Heisenji Sports Club. Yamaguchi has stated that losses to her brothers motivated her to improve her skills. Diagnosed with asthma as a child, she took swimming lessons until the sixth grade to improve her health and body balance, focusing on backstroke to counter the one-sided bias of badminton. During her childhood, Yamaguchi had limited awareness of Japan's or the world's top players, instead developing her skills by studying examples from local players and coaches.

While at Heisenji Elementary School, she was a five-time champion at the National Elementary School ABC Tournament and won the National Elementary School Championship singles title for four consecutive years. At age nine, she was selected for the junior national team. During her time at Katsuyama Minami Junior High, she won both All Japan Junior Championships Newcomers' Division in her first year, followed by the National Junior High School Tournament title in her third year. At age 14, she became the youngest player to compete at the All Japan Championships, though she lost in the first round. In December 2012, at age 15, she became the youngest player ever selected for Japanese national A team.

Despite receiving offers from schools with elite badminton programs, Yamaguchi chose to attend her local Katsuyama High School to play with childhood friends. From 2013 to 2015, she became the first player in the tournament's history to win three consecutive singles titles at the National High School Championships (Inter-High). In 2014, at 17 years and 6 months old, she became the fourth high school student to win the All Japan Championships and the second-youngest winner in the tournament's history, after Nozomi Okuhara. Following her graduation in 2016, she joined the Kumamoto Saishunkan badminton team.

== Career ==
=== 2012: International debut ===
Yamaguchi began her junior international career in 2012. At the Asian Junior Championships, she won a bronze medal in girls' singles and was part of the Japanese team that won the nation's first mixed team title. Later that year, she claimed a silver medal in girls' singles and the mixed team event at the World Junior Championships. She also made her senior international debut that year at the Osaka International, where she upset the first seed Bellaetrix Manuputty in the first round, before losing to Ayumi Mine in the next round.

=== 2013: First Super Series title and World Junior champion ===
In 2013, Yamaguchi won her first Super Series title at the Japan Open. Advancing from the qualifying round, her victory at the age of 16 years, 3 months, and 16 days made her the youngest player ever to win a Super Series event. This win also marked Japan's first title at the Japan Open in any discipline in 32 years and only the second-ever Super Series women's singles title won by a Japanese player. On the junior circuit, Yamaguchi won her first World Junior Championships title, defeating compatriot Aya Ohori in the final. Her other results that year included a gold medal in mixed doubles at the Asian Youth Games, a bronze medal in women's singles at the East Asian Games, and runner-up finishes at both the New Zealand Open and the Osaka International. For her performance throughout the season, Yamaguchi was named the BWF Most Promising Player of the Year.

=== 2014: Junior titles and senior breakthrough ===
In 2014, Yamaguchi successfully defended her World Junior Championships title, becoming the first Japanese player in the tournament's history to win consecutive titles across all disciplines. That same year, she won the Asian Junior Championships. She also contributed to Japan's mixed team bronze medals at both the World and Asian Junior Championships. At the Youth Olympic Games in Nanjing, she served as the flag-bearer for the Japanese team and earned a silver medal in girls' singles. On the senior circuit, she reached her first Super Series Premier final at the China Open, finishing as runner-up after victories over Wang Shixian and Sun Yu. Her performance qualified her for the season-ending BWF Super Series Finals, where she reached the semifinals. She was also a member of the Japanese team that won the silver medal at the Uber Cup. For the second consecutive year, she was named the BWF Most Promising Player of the Year.

=== 2015: First Grand Prix Gold title ===
In 2015, Yamaguchi won her first BWF Grand Prix Gold title at the Bitburger Open, where she defeated Busanan Ongbamrungphan in the final. She also finished as the runner-up at the Japan Open Super Series, losing the final to her compatriot Nozomi Okuhara. During the Indonesian Open, she defeated the reigning Olympic champion, Li Xuerui, in the second round. In team competition, she helped Japan win the silver medal at the Sudirman Cup, which marked the country's first-ever silver medal at the event.

=== 2016: Olympic debut and two Super Series titles ===
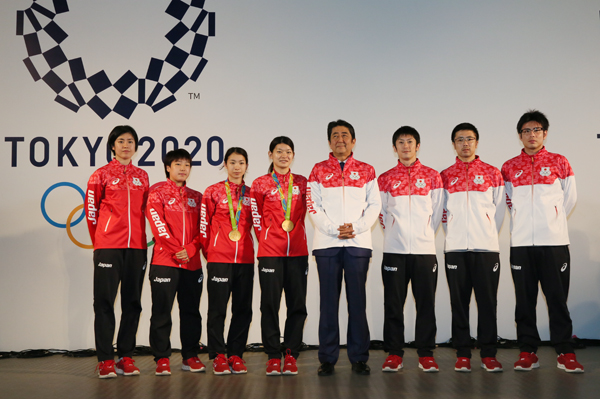
Yamaguchi attending a prime ministerial reception for the Japanese Olympic delegation following the 2016 Summer Olympics, August 2016.

Yamaguchi made her Olympic debut at the 2016 Rio Olympics, where she was eliminated in the quarterfinals by her compatriot Nozomi Okuhara. Following the Olympics, Yamaguchi won consecutive titles on the Super Series circuit. In September, she captured her second career Super Series title at the Korea Open, defeating Sung Ji-hyun in the final. The following month, she won the Denmark Open by defeating Tai Tzu-ying to claim her first Super Series Premier title. She concluded her season by qualifying for the year-end Dubai Super Series Finals, where she was eliminated in the round-robin stage. In team competition, she represented Japan at the Uber Cup in Kunshan, where the team finished with a bronze medal.

=== 2017: Season-ending title and Asian team gold ===
Yamaguchi won three titles in 2017: the German Open, the China Open, and the season-ending Dubai World Superseries Finals. She also finished as the runner-up at the Asian Championships, the Australian Open, the Denmark Open, and the French Open. At the World Championships, she entered as the top seed but was eliminated in the third round. In team competition, she was part of the squad that won Japan's first Asia Mixed Team Championships title. She concluded the season as the year's highest-earning player, collecting US$261,363 from 15 tournaments.

=== 2018: World No. 1 and Uber Cup champion ===
On 19 April 2018, at the age of 20 years, 317 days, Yamaguchi became the first Japanese singles player to reach the world No. 1 ranking. At major individual championships, she secured bronze medals at both the World Championships in Nanjing and the Asian Games in Jakarta, losing both semifinals to P. V. Sindhu. On the BWF World Tour, Yamaguchi won two titles and finished as a runner-up once. In March, she won the German Open by defeating Chen Yufei in the final. She followed this by reaching her first All England Open final, finishing as the runner-up to Tai Tzu-ying. In October, she captured the French Open title, defeating Tai. She concluded her season with a semifinal finish at the year-end BWF World Tour Finals.

In team competition, Yamaguchi won three gold medals with the Japanese national team. She was part of the squads that won the Asia Team Championships in Alor Setar and the Asian Games women's team event in Jakarta. She also contributed to Japan's gold medal at the Uber Cup in Bangkok, which marked the country's first title at the tournament in 37 years.

=== 2019: Asian Champion and return to World No. 1 ===
In 2019, Yamaguchi became the first Japanese player to win the women's singles title at the Asian Championships. On the World Tour, she secured three titles: the German Open, her first Super 1000 title at the Indonesia Open, and the Japan Open. Her consecutive victories in Indonesia and Japan propelled her back to the World No. 1 ranking on 30 July. She also finished as the runner-up at the Malaysia Open and earned a silver medal with the Japanese team at the Sudirman Cup. The latter half of the season was disrupted by injuries; a lower back injury sustained after the Japan Open limited her preparation for the World Championships, resulting in a second-round exit. She later suffered a right calf injury, forcing her withdrawal from the Korea Open, before ending the season with a semifinal finish at the BWF World Tour Finals.

=== 2020–2021: Olympic campaign and first World Championship title ===
In a 2020 season shortened by the COVID-19 pandemic, Yamaguchi's primary achievement was winning the Thailand Masters. In team competition, she was a member of the Japanese team that won the Asian Women's team championship.

The following year, in 2021, Yamaguchi competed as the fourth seed at the 2020 Tokyo Olympics, where she lost in the quarterfinals to P. V. Sindhu. On the BWF World Tour, she won two consecutive titles at the Denmark Open and the French Open, and finished as the runner-up at the Indonesia Masters. In team competitions, she was a member of the Japanese squad that earned silver medals at both the Sudirman Cup and the Uber Cup. Yamaguchi ended the year by capturing her first world title at the 2021 World Championships in Huelva, after defeating Tai Tzu-ying in the final. With this victory, she became the second Japanese women's singles player to win the World Championships after Nozomi Okuhara.

=== 2022: Second World Championship title and All England champion ===
Yamaguchi's 2022 season was highlighted by defending her world title and winning her first All England Open title. At major individual championships, she successfully defended her crown at the World Championships in Tokyo, defeating Chen Yufei. Her victory at the World Championships made her the first Japanese women's singles player to win consecutive world titles. Earlier in the season, she won a silver medal at the Asian Championships in Manila after losing to China's Wang Zhiyi. On the World Tour Yamaguchi won three titles. In March, she captured her maiden All England Open title by defeating An Se-young. In September, she won the Japan Open, once again defeating An in the final. She concluded the season by winning the year-end World Tour Finals in Bangkok, defeating Tai Tzu-ying. In team competition, she represented Japan at the Uber Cup in Bangkok, contributing to the squad's bronze medal finish. In recognition of her achievements, Yamaguchi was named the BWF Female Player of the Year.

=== 2023: Five World Tour titles and season-ending injury ===
In 2023, Yamaguchi won five World Tour titles: the Malaysia Open, German Open, Malaysia Masters, Canada Open, and Hong Kong Open. She also finished as runner-up at the India Open, Singapore Open, and China Open. Notably, five of her eight World Tour finals that season were played against An Se-young; Yamaguchi defeated An to win the Malaysia and German Opens, but lost to her in the finals of the India, Singapore, and China Opens. At major individual championships, Yamaguchi secured bronze medals at both the World Championships in Copenhagen and the Asian Championships in Dubai. In team events, she contributed to Japan's bronze medal finishes at the Sudirman Cup and the Asian Games. However, her season was curtailed by a right peroneal tendon injury sustained during the Asian Games in September, forcing her to retire from the match. This injury subsequently led to her withdrawal from the rest of her scheduled tournaments, including the season-ending World Tour Finals in Hangzhou.

=== 2024: Olympic run and two home titles ===
After a three-and-a-half-month recovery from a right foot injury sustained in late 2023, Yamaguchi began her 2024 season in January. She finished as the runner-up at consecutive tournaments, losing to An Se-young at the French Open and retiring against Carolina Marín in the All England Open final due to a right hip injury. This hip injury recurred at the Uber Cup in May, where she contributed to Japan's bronze medal. The injury continued to disrupt her Olympic preparations, leading to a withdrawal from the Indonesia Open in June and delaying her return to full-scale training until July, mere weeks before the Olympics.

At the 2024 Paris Olympics, she reached the quarterfinals before losing to the eventual gold medalist, An Se-young. Following the Olympics, Yamaguchi secured two titles on home soil, defeating Busanan Ongbamrungphan to win the Japan Open and Gregoria Mariska Tunjung to claim the Japan Masters. Her season concluded with another injury-forced retirement, this time due to a right calf injury, at the All Japan Championships in December.

=== 2025: Third World Championship title ===
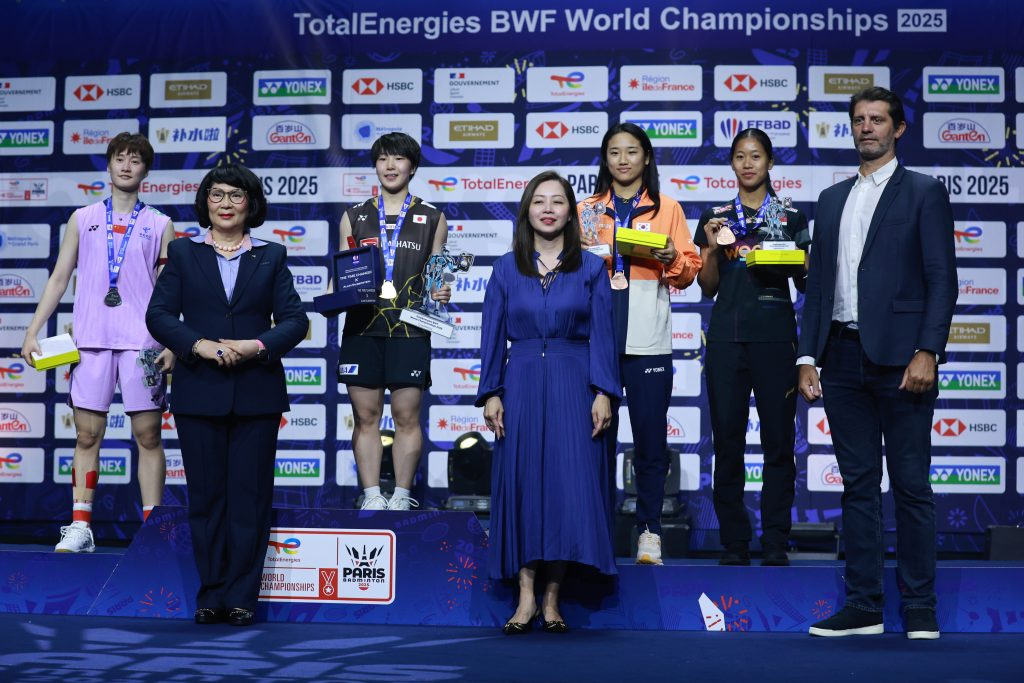
Yamaguchi on the podium after winning her third women's singles title at the 2025 World Championships.

Returning from a calf injury that concluded her 2024 season, Yamaguchi's 2025 campaign was highlighted by a historic victory at the World Championships in Paris. She secured her third women's singles world title by defeating Chen Yufei in the final (21–9, 21–13). This victory made her the first Japanese player in any discipline to win three world championships titles.

On the World Tour Yamaguchi captured two Super 500 titles. She won her first tour title of the year at the Korea Open by defeating An Se-young. She followed this by winning the Arctic Open with a straight-games victory over Busanan Ongbamrungphan. She displayed consistent form throughout the season, reaching the semifinals of six tournaments she entered. This run included the season-ending World Tour Finals, as well as three Super 1000 events: the All England Open, the Indonesia Open, and the China Open. In team events, she represented Japan at the Sudirman Cup in Xiamen, contributing to the squad's bronze medal finish.

=== 2026: Four World Tour titles and major silver medals ===
Yamaguchi began her 2026 season in January at the Malaysia Open, reaching the quarterfinals before retiring from her match against India's P. V. Sindhu due to a right knee injury. In March, despite limited practice time and the lingering effects of her knee injury, she advanced to the semifinals of the All England Open, losing to the eventual champion, Wang Zhiyi. The following month, Yamaguchi won a bronze medal at the Asian Championships in Ningbo after losing the semifinal to Wang. Later that month, she represented Japan at the Uber Cup in Horsens, contributing to the team's bronze medal finish.

Between May and July, Yamaguchi reached six consecutive tournament finals. She won her first title of the year at the Super 500 Thailand Open by defeating Chen Yufei. This victory was followed by consecutive runner-up finishes at the Singapore Open and the Indonesia Open, where she lost both finals to An Se-young. She then secured her second title of the season at the Super 500 Australian Open, defeating Pornpawee Chochuwong. After finishing as the runner-up to Sindhu at the Japan Open, Yamaguchi won the Super 1000 title at the China Open with another victory over Chen.

At the World Championships in New Delhi, Yamaguchi won the silver medal after losing the final to An Se-young. In September, she helped Japan earn a silver medal in the women's team event at the 2026 Asian Games in Aichi–Nagoya. In the individual women's singles event, she became the first Japanese women's singles player in 28 years to reach the final, following Kanako Yonekura in 1998. She ultimately won silver after losing to An in the final. She later added runner-up results at the Denmark Open and Korea Open, again losing both finals to An. One week later, her title drought in the second half of the year ended when she won the Japan Masters in straight games against Wang Zhiyi.

== Rivalries ==
=== An Se-young ===
Yamaguchi maintains a prominent rivalry with South Korea's An Se-young, with An leading their head-to-head record 25–15 across 40 encounters. Yamaguchi's victories over An in tournament finals include the 2020 Thailand Masters, 2021 Denmark Open, 2022 All England Open, 2022 Japan Open, 2023 Malaysia Open, 2023 German Open, and the 2025 Korea Open. Conversely, An has won several finals against Yamaguchi, capturing titles at the 2021 Indonesia Masters, 2023 India Open, 2023 Singapore Open, 2023 China Open, 2024 French Open, 2026 Singapore Open, and 2026 Indonesia Open. Their encounters at major championships include the quarterfinals of the 2024 Paris Olympics, where An defeated Yamaguchi en route to winning the gold medal. Yamaguchi has defeated An in two World Championships matches: in the 2021 quarterfinals and 2022 semifinals, en route to her world titles.

=== Chen Yufei ===
Yamaguchi has a long-standing rivalry with China's Chen Yufei, leading their head-to-head record 24–14 across 38 encounters. Their most significant matches include two World Championships finals, where Yamaguchi defeated Chen to secure the gold medal in both the 2022 Tokyo and 2025 Paris editions. Yamaguchi has also defeated Chen in the finals of the 2018 German Open, the 2026 Thailand Open, and the 2026 China Open. Conversely, Chen has secured several victories against Yamaguchi, including an upset win over the top-seeded Yamaguchi in the third round of the 2017 World Championships, as well as semifinal victories at the 2019 World Tour Finals and 2023 All England Open. They have also frequently represented Japan and China as top singles players in major team events; notably, Chen defeated Yamaguchi in the final of the 2019 Sudirman Cup to help China claim the title.

=== Nozomi Okuhara ===
Yamaguchi shares a domestic rivalry with compatriot Nozomi Okuhara, with Okuhara leading their head-to-head record 12–9 across 21 encounters. Their rivalry began in their junior careers, with Okuhara defeating Yamaguchi in the final of the 2012 World Junior Championships. In their senior careers, Okuhara achieved key victories, including the quarterfinal of the 2016 Rio Olympics and the finals of the 2015 Japan Open and 2017 Australian Open. Yamaguchi's significant wins include defeating Okuhara in the 2019 Japan Open final. Their matches have frequently determined the top position in Japanese women's singles.

=== Tai Tzu-ying ===
Yamaguchi has a closely contested rivalry with Chinese Taipei's Tai Tzu-ying, with Tai leading their head-to-head record 13–11 in 24 encounters. Yamaguchi's notable victories against Tai in finals include the 2021 World Championships, the 2022 World Tour Finals, the 2016 Denmark Open, and the 2018 French Open. Conversely, Tai has defeated Yamaguchi in the finals of the 2017 Asian Championships, the 2017 French Open, the 2018 All England Open, and the 2019 Malaysia Open.

== Playing style ==
Chinese player Sun Yu described Yamaguchi's style, noting that despite her small stature, she is diligent, swift, and adept at retrieving difficult shots that others typically cannot save. Sun Yu characterized her play as based on patience and consistent performance, observing that she makes few mistakes and capitalizes on opponents' rushed errors. Another Chinese player, Wang Shixian, concurred that Yamaguchi is quick and nimble, suggesting challengers must match her speed.

In 2014, Chinese team head coach Li Yongbo commented that Yamaguchi plays with patience and quality. Regarding her short stature and potential for further development, he stated that badminton talent is not limited by height restrictions, and her skill is sufficient to compensate for her height. He added that her future would depend on her performance in the coming year.

== Honours and awards ==
- BWF Awards: Eddy Choong Most Promising Player of the Year (2013).
- BWF Awards: Eddy Choong Most Promising Player of the Year (2014).
- Japanese Olympic Committee (JOC) Sports Award: Newcomer Award (2014).
- Yonex: Minoru Yoneyama Award (2014).
- Katsuyama City: Citizen's Honor Award (2018).
- Kumamoto Prefecture: Sports Special Achievement Award (2022).
- BWF Awards: Player of the Year (2022).
- Japanese Olympic Committee (JOC) Sports Award: Outstanding Award (2022).
- Yonex: Minoru Yoneyama Award (2023).
- Fukui Prefecture: Prefectural Honor Award (2025).

== Achievements ==
=== World Championships ===
Women's singles
Year	Venue	Opponent	Score	Result	Ref.
2018	Nanjing Youth Olympic Sports Park, Nanjing, China	(India) P. V. Sindhu	16–21, 22–24	Bronze	
2021	Palacio de los Deportes Carolina Marín, Huelva, Spain	(Chinese Taipei) Tai Tzu-ying	21–14, 21–11	Gold	
2022	Tokyo Metropolitan Gymnasium, Tokyo, Japan	(China) Chen Yufei	21–12, 10–21, 21–14	Gold	
2023	Royal Arena, Copenhagen, Denmark	(Spain) Carolina Marín	21–23, 13–21	Bronze	
2025	Adidas Arena, Paris, France	(China) Chen Yufei	21–9, 21–13	Gold	
2026	Indira Gandhi Arena, New Delhi, India	(South Korea) An Se-young	17–21, 14–21	Silver	

=== Asian Games ===
Women's singles
Year	Venue	Opponent	Score	Result	Ref.
2018	Istora Gelora Bung Karno, Jakarta, Indonesia	(India) P. V. Sindhu	17–21, 21–15, 10–21	Bronze	
2026	Ichinomiya City Municipal Gymnasium, Ichinomiya, Japan	(South Korea) An Se-young	17–21, 9–21	Silver	

=== Asian Championships ===
Women's singles
Year	Venue	Opponent	Score	Result	Ref.
2017	Wuhan Sports Center Gymnasium, Wuhan, China	(Chinese Taipei) Tai Tzu-ying	21–18, 11–21, 18–21	Silver	
2019	Wuhan Sports Center Gymnasium, Wuhan, China	(China) He Bingjiao	21–19, 21–9	Gold	
2022	Muntinlupa Sports Complex, Metro Manila, Philippines	(China) Wang Zhiyi	21–15, 13–21, 19–21	Silver	
2023	Sheikh Rashid Bin Hamdan Indoor Hall, Dubai, United Arab Emirates	(Chinese Taipei) Tai Tzu-ying	12–21, 21–16, 15–21	Bronze	
2026	Ningbo Olympic Sports Center Gymnasium, Ningbo, China	(China) Wang Zhiyi	21–14, 9–21, 13–21	Bronze	

=== East Asian Games ===
Women's singles
Year	Venue	Opponent	Score	Result	Ref.
2013	Binhai New Area Dagang Gymnasium, Tianjin, China	(China) Wang Shixian	21–19, 19–21, 16–21	Bronze	

=== Youth Olympic Games ===
Girls' singles
Year	Venue	Opponent	Score	Result	Ref.
2014	Nanjing Sport Institute, Nanjing, China	(China) He Bingjiao	24–22, 21–23, 17–21	Silver	

=== World Junior Championships ===
Girls' singles
Year	Venue	Opponent	Score	Result	Ref.
2012	Chiba Port Arena, Chiba, Japan	(Japan) Nozomi Okuhara	12–21, 9–21	Silver	
2013	Hua Mark Indoor Stadium, Bangkok, Thailand	(Japan) Aya Ohori	21–11, 21–13	Gold	
2014	Stadium Sultan Abdul Halim, Alor Setar, Malaysia	(China) He Bingjiao	14–21, 21–18, 21–13	Gold	

=== Asian Youth Games ===
Mixed doubles
Year	Venue	Partner	Opponent	Score	Result	Ref.
2013	Nanjing Sport Institute; Nanjing, China	(Japan) Minoru Koga	(Thailand) Dechapol Puavaranukroh (Thailand) Puttita Supajirakul	21–19, 19–21, 21–17	Gold	

=== Asian Junior Championships ===
Girls' singles
Year	Venue	Opponent	Score	Result	Ref.
2012	Gimcheon Indoor Stadium, Gimcheon, South Korea	(Japan) Nozomi Okuhara	19–21, 9–21	Bronze	
2014	Taipei Gymnasium, Taipei, Taiwan	(China) Chen Yufei	21–10，21–15	Gold	

=== BWF World Tour (24 titles, 13 runners-up) ===
The BWF World Tour, which was announced on 19 March 2017 and implemented in 2018, is a series of elite badminton tournaments sanctioned by the Badminton World Federation (BWF). The BWF World Tour is divided into levels of World Tour Finals, Super 1000, Super 750, Super 500, Super 300, and the BWF Tour Super 100.

Women's singles
Year	Tournament	Level	Opponent	Score	Result	Ref.
2018	German Open	Super 300	(China) Chen Yufei	21–19, 6–21, 21–12	(gold) Winner	
2018	All England Open	Super 1000	(Chinese Taipei) Tai Tzu-ying	20–22, 13–21	(silver) Runner-up	
2018	French Open	Super 750	(Chinese Taipei) Tai Tzu-ying	22–20, 17–21, 21–13	(gold) Winner	
2019	German Open	Super 300	(Thailand) Ratchanok Intanon	16–21, 21–14, 25–23	(gold) Winner	
2019	Malaysia Open	Super 750	(Chinese Taipei) Tai Tzu-ying	16–21, 19–21	(silver) Runner-up	
2019	Indonesia Open	Super 1000	(India) P. V. Sindhu	21–15, 21–16	(gold) Winner	
2019	Japan Open	Super 750	(Japan) Nozomi Okuhara	21–13, 21–15	(gold) Winner	
2020	Thailand Masters	Super 300	(South Korea) An Se-young	21–16, 22–20	(gold) Winner	
2021	Denmark Open	Super 1000	(South Korea) An Se-young	18–21, 25–23, 16–5 retired	(gold) Winner	
2021	French Open	Super 750	(Japan) Sayaka Takahashi	21–18, 21–12	(gold) Winner	
2021	Indonesia Masters	Super 750	(South Korea) An Se-young	17–21, 19–21	(silver) Runner-up	
2022	All England Open	Super 1000	(South Korea) An Se-young	21–15, 21–15	(gold) Winner	
2022	Japan Open	Super 750	(South Korea) An Se-young	21–9, 21–15	(gold) Winner	
2022	BWF World Tour Finals	World Tour Finals	(Chinese Taipei) Tai Tzu-ying	21–18, 22–20	(gold) Winner	
2023	Malaysia Open	Super 1000	(South Korea) An Se-young	12–21, 21–19, 21–11	(gold) Winner	
2023	India Open	Super 750	(South Korea) An Se-young	21–15, 16–21, 12–21	(silver) Runner-up	
2023	German Open	Super 300	(South Korea) An Se-young	21–11, 21–14	(gold) Winner	
2023	Malaysia Masters	Super 500	(Indonesia) Gregoria Mariska Tunjung	21–17, 21–7	(gold) Winner	
2023	Singapore Open	Super 750	(South Korea) An Se-young	16–21, 14–21	(silver) Runner-up	
2023	Canada Open	Super 500	(Thailand) Ratchanok Intanon	21–19, 21–16	(gold) Winner	
2023	China Open	Super 1000	(South Korea) An Se-young	10–21, 19–21	(silver) Runner-up	
2023	Hong Kong Open	Super 500	(China) Zhang Yiman	21–18, 21–15	(gold) Winner	
2024	French Open	Super 750	(South Korea) An Se-young	21–18, 13–21, 10–21	(silver) Runner-up	
2024	All England Open	Super 1000	(Spain) Carolina Marín	24–26, 1–11 retired	(silver) Runner-up	
2024	Japan Open	Super 750	(Thailand) Busanan Ongbamrungphan	21–12, 21–10	(gold) Winner	
2024	Japan Masters	Super 500	(Indonesia) Gregoria Mariska Tunjung	21–12, 21–12	(gold) Winner	
2025	Korea Open	Super 500	(South Korea) An Se-young	21–18, 21–13	(gold) Winner	
2025	Arctic Open	Super 500	(Thailand) Busanan Ongbamrungphan	21–19, 21–16	(gold) Winner	
2026	Thailand Open	Super 500	(China) Chen Yufei	21–14, 21–18	(gold) Winner	
2026	Singapore Open	Super 750	(South Korea) An Se-young	11–21, 21–17, 19–21	(silver) Runner-up	
2026	Indonesia Open	Super 1000	(South Korea) An Se-young	21–23, 12–21	(silver) Runner-up	
2026	Australian Open	Super 500	(Thailand) Pornpawee Chochuwong	22–20, 21–18	(gold) Winner	
2026	Japan Open	Super 750	(India) P. V. Sindhu	17–21, 17–21	(silver) Runner-up	
2026	China Open	Super 1000	(China) Chen Yufei	21–18, 21–16	(gold) Winner	
2026	Denmark Open	Super 750	(South Korea) An Se-young	23–21, 14–21, 18–21	(silver) Runner-up	
2026	Korea Open	Super 500	(South Korea) An Se-young	12–21, 21–15, 16–21	(silver) Runner-up	
2026	Japan Masters	Super 500	(China) Wang Zhiyi	21–14, 22–20	(gold) Winner	

=== BWF Superseries (5 titles, 5 runners-up) ===
The BWF Superseries, which was launched on 14 December 2006 and implemented in 2007, was a series of elite badminton tournaments, sanctioned by the BWF. BWF Superseries levels were Superseries and Superseries Premier. A season of Superseries consisted of twelve tournaments around the world that had been introduced since 2011. Successful players were invited to the Superseries Finals, which were held at the end of each year.

Women's singles
Year	Tournament	Opponent	Score	Result	Ref.
2013	Japan Open	(Japan) Shizuka Uchida	21–15, 21–19	(gold) Winner	
2014	China Open	(India) Saina Nehwal	12–21, 20–22	(silver) Runner-up	
2015	Japan Open	(Japan) Nozomi Okuhara	18–21, 12–21	(silver) Runner-up	
2016	Korea Open	(South Korea) Sung Ji-hyun	20–22, 21–15, 21–18	(gold) Winner	
2016	Denmark Open	(Chinese Taipei) Tai Tzu-ying	19–21, 21–14, 21–12	(gold) Winner	
2017	Australian Open	(Japan) Nozomi Okuhara	12–21, 23–21, 17–21	(silver) Runner-up	
2017	Denmark Open	(Thailand) Ratchanok Intanon	21–14, 15–21, 19–21	(silver) Runner-up	
2017	French Open	(Chinese Taipei) Tai Tzu-ying	4–21, 16–21	(silver) Runner-up	
2017	China Open	(China) Gao Fangjie	21–13, 21–15	(gold) Winner	
2017	Dubai World Superseries Finals	(India) P. V. Sindhu	15–21, 21–12, 21–19	(gold) Winner	

BWF Super Series Finals tournament
BWF Super Series Premier tournament
BWF Super Series tournament

=== BWF Grand Prix (2 titles, 1 runner-up) ===
The BWF Grand Prix had two levels, the Grand Prix and Grand Prix Gold. It was a series of badminton tournaments sanctioned by the BWF and played between 2007 and 2017.

Women's singles
Year	Tournament	Opponent	Score	Result	Ref.
2013	New Zealand Open	(China) Deng Xuan	17–21, 21–18, 20–22	(silver) Runner-up	
2015	Bitburger Open	(Thailand) Busanan Ongbamrungphan	16–21, 21–14, 21–13	(gold) Winner	
2017	German Open	(Spain) Carolina Marín	Walkover	(gold) Winner	

BWF Grand Prix Gold tournament
BWF Grand Prix tournament

=== BWF International Challenge/Series (1 runner-up) ===
Women's singles
Year	Tournament	Opponent	Score	Result	Ref.
2013	Osaka International	(Japan) Kaori Imabeppu	20–22, 16–21	(silver) Runner-up	

BWF International Challenge tournament

== Performance timeline ==
Key

W	Won	F	Finalist	SF	Semi-finalist
QF	Quarter-finalist	#R	Rounds 4, 3, 2, 1	RR	Round-robin stage
Q#	Qualification round	A	Absent	w/d	Withdrew
G	Gold	S	Silver	B	Bronze
NH	Not held	N/A	Not applicable	DNQ	Did not qualify

=== Overview ===
Singles	Played	Wins	Losses	Balance
Total	752	573	179	+394
2026	40	33	7	+26

Doubles	Played	Wins	Losses	Balance
Total	37	26	11	+15
2026	0	0	0	0

=== National team ===
==== Junior level ====
Team events	2012	2013	2014	Ref.
Asian Junior Championships	G	B	B	
World Junior Championships	S	4th	B	

==== Senior level ====
Team events	2013	2014	2015	2016	2017	2018	2019	2020	2021	2022	2023	2024	2025	2026	Ref.
East Asian Games	B	NH													
Asia Team Championships	NH			A	NH	G	NH	G	NH	A	NH	A	NH	A	
Asia Mixed Team Championships	NH				G	NH	A	NH			A	NH	A	NH	
Asian Games	NH	B	NH			G	NH			B	NH			S	
Uber Cup	NH	S	NH	B	NH	G	NH	S	NH	B	NH	B	NH	B	
Sudirman Cup	A	NH	S	NH	B	NH	S	NH	S	NH	B	NH	B	NH	

=== Individual competitions ===
==== Junior level ====
Girls' singles

Events	2012	2013	2014	Ref.
Asian Junior Championships	B	A	G	
Asian Youth Games	NH	R16	NH	
World Junior Championships	S	G	G	
Youth Olympic Games	NH		S	

Mixed doubles

Events	2012	2013	2014	Ref.
Asian Junior Championships	2R	A		
Asian Youth Games	NH	G	NH	
World Junior Championships	2R	A		
Youth Olympic Games	NH		RR	

==== Senior level ====
===== Women's singles =====
Events	2013	2014	2015	2016	2017	2018	2019	2020	2021	2022	2023	2024	2025	2026	Ref.
East Asian Games	B	NH													
Asian Championships	A		2R	2R	S	w/d	G	NH		S	B	QF	QF	B	
Asian Games	NH	2R	NH			B	NH			A	NH			S	
World Championships	A			NH	3R	B	2R	NH	G	G	B	NH	G	S	
Olympic Games	NH			QF	NH			QF	NH				QF	NH	

Tournament	BWF Superseries / Grand Prix						BWF World Tour									Best	Ref.
Tournament	2012	2013	2014	2015	2016	2017	2018	2019	2020	2021	2022	2023	2024	2025	2026	Best	Ref.
Malaysia Open	A		QF	2R	1R	QF	QF	F	NH		1R	W	QF	A	QF	W ('23)	
India Open	A				2R	SF	A		NH		A	F	2R	A	w/d	F ('23)	
Indonesia Masters	A					NH	A	2R	2R	F	A	w/d	w/d	A		F ('21)	
Thailand Masters	NH				A				W	NH		A				W ('20)	
German Open	A			1R	SF	W	W	W	NH		2R	W	A			W ('17, '18, '19, '23)	
All England Open	A			1R	2R	SF	F	SF	QF	QF	W	SF	F	SF	SF	W ('22)	
Swiss Open	A			SF	1R	A			NH	A						SF ('15)	
Thailand Open	A		NH	A			QF	w/d	w/d	NH	QF	A			W	W ('26)	
Thailand Open	A		NH	A			QF	w/d	w/d	NH	QF	A			W	W ('26)	
Malaysia Masters	A				1R	A	SF	1R	1R	NH	QF	W	A	SF	A	W ('23)	
Singapore Open	A			QF	SF	QF	A	SF	NH		A	F	QF	SF	F	F ('23, '26)	
Indonesia Open	A		1R	QF	2R	QF	QF	W	NH	QF	QF	QF	w/d	SF	F	W ('19)	
Australian Open	A		1R	2R	QF	F	A		NH		A		w/d	A	W	W ('26)	
Macau Open	A			SF	A				NH				A			SF ('15)	
U.S. Open	A			SF	A				NH			A				SF ('15)	
Canada Open	A								NH		A	W	A			W ('23)	
Japan Open	1R	W	1R	F	SF	QF	QF	W	NH		W	QF	W	SF	F	W ('13, '19, '22, '24)	
China Open	A		F	2R	QF	W	SF	1R	NH			F	SF	SF	W	W ('17, '26)	
Korea Masters	A							SF	NH		A					SF ('19)	
China Masters	A						2R	1R	NH			w/d	1R	SF	SF	SF ('25, '26)	
Arctic Open	N/A											A		W	A	W ('25)	
Denmark Open	A		2R	2R	W	F	2R	1R	w/d	W	QF	w/d	1R	SF	F	W ('16, '21)	
French Open	A		QF	1R	QF	F	W	SF	NH	W	SF	w/d	F	QF	2R	W ('18, '21)	
Hylo Open	A			W	A											W ('15)	
Korea Open	A		2R	SF	W	SF	SF	1R	NH		A	SF	1R	W	F	W ('16, '25)	
Japan Masters	NH											w/d	W	2R	W	W ('24, '26)	
Hong Kong Open	A		QF	2R	QF	QF	QF	SF	NH			W	A			W ('23)	
Superseries / World Tour Finals	DNQ		SF	DNQ	RR	W	SF	SF	DNQ	SF	W	w/d	RR	SF	Q	W ('17, '22)	
New Zealand Open	A	F	A					SF	NH							F ('13)	
Year-end ranking	242	87	12	10	7	2	5	3	3	2	1	3	3	3		1	
Tournament	2012	2013	2014	2015	2016	2017	2018	2019	2020	2021	2022	2023	2024	2025	2026	Best	Ref.

===== Women's doubles =====
Tournament	BWF Superseries / Grand Prix	Best
Tournament	2012	Best
Japan Open	2R	2R ('12)
Year-end ranking	127	114

== Record against other players ==
Yamaguchi's record against year-end finals finalists, world championships semi-finalists, and Olympic quarter-finalists. Accurate as of 15 November 2026.

Player	M	W	L	Diff.
(China) Chen Yufei	39	25	14	+11
(China) Han Yue	11	8	3	+5
(China) He Bingjiao	17	13	4	+9
(China) Li Xuerui	11	4	7	–3
(China) Wang Shixian	4	2	2	0
(China) Wang Yihan	3	1	2	–1
(China) Wang Zhiyi	21	11	10	+1
(China) Zhang Yiman	7	6	1	+5
(Chinese Taipei) Tai Tzu-ying	24	11	13	–2
(India) Saina Nehwal	13	11	2	+9
(India) P. V. Sindhu	31	15	16	–1
(Indonesia) Gregoria Mariska Tunjung	20	15	5	+10

Player	M	W	L	Diff.
(Indonesia) Putri Kusuma Wardani	8	8	0	+8
(Japan) Minatsu Mitani	2	2	0	+2
(Japan) Aya Ohori	7	7	0	+7
(Japan) Nozomi Okuhara	21	9	12	–3
(South Korea) An Se-young	40	15	25	–10
(South Korea) Bae Yeon-ju	6	4	2	+2
(South Korea) Sung Ji-hyun	10	5	5	0
(Spain) Carolina Marín	17	7	10	–3
(Thailand) Porntip Buranaprasertsuk	2	2	0	+2
(Thailand) Pornpawee Chochuwong	20	15	5	+10
(Thailand) Ratchanok Intanon	27	16	11	+5
