= Badminton at the 2018 Asian Games – Women's singles =

Women's singles at the 2018 Asian Games
- Venue: Istora Gelora Bung Karno
- Dates: 23–28 August
- Competitors: 31 from 17 nations

Medalists
gold medal	Tai Tzu-ying	Chinese Taipei
silver medal	P. V. Sindhu	India
bronze medal	Saina Nehwal	India
bronze medal	Akane Yamaguchi	Japan

The badminton women's singles tournament at the 2018 Asian Games in Jakarta took place from 23 to 28 August at Istora Gelora Bung Karno.

== Schedule ==
All times are Western Indonesia Time (UTC+07:00)

Date	Time	Event
Thursday, 23 August 2018	12:00	Round of 32
Friday, 24 August 2018	13:00	Round of 32
Saturday, 25 August 2018	13:00	Round of 16
Sunday, 26 August 2018	13:00	Quarterfinals
Monday, 27 August 2018	12:00	Semifinals
Tuesday, 28 August 2018	13:10	Gold medal match

== Results ==
=== Final ===
Gold medal match
1	Tai Tzu-ying (TPE)	21	21
3	P. V. Sindhu (IND)	13	16

=== Top half ===
Round of 32
Cheung Ngan Yi (HKG)	21	21
Rana Abu-Harbesh (KSA)	2	5
Nozomi Okuhara (JPN)	21	21
Aminath Shahurunaaz Moosa (MDV)	2	5
He Bingjiao (CHN)	21	21
Nguyễn Thùy Linh (VIE)	14	5
4	Ratchanok Intanon (THA)	21	21
Jessica Gurung (NEP)	7	4
Sung Ji-hyun (KOR)	21	21
Mahoor Shahzad (PAK)	9	10
Sorayya Aghaei (IRI)	7	9
Saina Nehwal (IND)	21	21
Thilini Hendahewa (SRI)	6	4
Fitriani (INA)	21	21

Round of 16
1	Tai Tzu-ying (TPE)	21	21
Cheung Ngan Yi (HKG)	9	14
Nozomi Okuhara (JPN)	21	21
He Bingjiao (CHN)	10	12
4	Ratchanok Intanon (THA)	21	24
Sung Ji-hyun (KOR)	15	22
Saina Nehwal (IND)	21	21
Fitriani (INA)	6	14

Quarterfinals
1	Tai Tzu-ying (TPE)	21	21
Nozomi Okuhara (JPN)	15	10
4	Ratchanok Intanon (THA)	18	16
Saina Nehwal (IND)	21	21

Semifinals
1	Tai Tzu-ying (TPE)	21	21
Saina Nehwal (IND)	17	14

=== Bottom half ===
Round of 32
Pai Yu-po (TPE)	15	20
Nitchaon Jindapol (THA)	21	22
Kavidi Sirimannage (SRI)	21	21
Shatha Al-Mutairi (KSA)	4	4
Ng Weng Chi (MAC)	4	7
Gregoria Mariska Tunjung (INA)	21	21
Vũ Thị Trang (VIE)	10	21	21
3	P. V. Sindhu (IND)	21	12	23
Sehra Akram (PAK)	7	2
Yip Pui Yin (HKG)	21	21
An Se-young (KOR)	15	8
Chen Yufei (CHN)	21	21
Nangsal Tamang (NEP)	21	21
Fathimath Nabaaha Abdul Razzaq (MDV)	19	15
Lidaa Saraj (AFG)	0	3
2	Akane Yamaguchi (JPN)	21	21

Round of 16
Nitchaon Jindapol (THA)	21	21
Kavidi Sirimannage (SRI)	4	14
Gregoria Mariska Tunjung (INA)	12	15
3	P. V. Sindhu (IND)	21	21
Yip Pui Yin (HKG)	20	17
Chen Yufei (CHN)	22	21
Nangsal Tamang (NEP)	7	12
2	Akane Yamaguchi (JPN)	21	21

Quarterfinals
Nitchaon Jindapol (THA)	11	21	14
3	P. V. Sindhu (IND)	21	16	21
Chen Yufei (CHN)	19	11
2	Akane Yamaguchi (JPN)	21	21

Semifinals
3	P. V. Sindhu (IND)	21	15	21
2	Akane Yamaguchi (JPN)	17	21	10
