= 2026 BWF World Championships – Women's singles =

Badminton championships

Women's singles at the 2026 BWF World Championships
- Venue: Indira Gandhi Arena
- Location: New Delhi, India
- Dates: 17–23 August
- Competitors: 64 from 38 nations

Medalists
| gold medal | An Se-young | South Korea |
| silver medal | Akane Yamaguchi | Japan |
| bronze medal | Wang Zhiyi | China |
| bronze medal | Pornpawee Chochuwong | Thailand |

The Women's singles tournament of the 2026 BWF World Championships took place from 17 to 23 August 2026 at the Indira Gandhi Arena in New Delhi.

== Seeds ==
The seeding list was based on the World Rankings of 31 July 2026.

1. (South Korea) An Se-young (champion)
2. (Japan) Akane Yamaguchi (final)
3. (China) Wang Zhiyi (semi-finals)
4. (China) Chen Yufei (third round)
5. (China) Han Yue (quarter-finals)
6. (Indonesia) Putri Kusuma Wardani (third round)
7. (Thailand) Ratchanok Intanon (second round)
8. (Japan) Tomoka Miyazaki (third round)
9. (India) P. V. Sindhu (third round)
10. (Thailand) Pornpawee Chochuwong (semi-finals)
11. (Japan) Nozomi Okuhara (quarter-finals)
12. (South Korea) Kim Ga-eun (third round)
13. (Canada) Michelle Li (quarter-finals)
14. (South Korea) Sim Yu-jin (third round)
15. (Denmark) Line Christophersen (quarter-finals)
16. (Denmark) Mia Blichfeldt (third round)

== Draw ==
The drawing ceremony was held on 5 August.

=== Finals ===
Semi-finals
1 | (South Korea) An Se-young | 24 | 21
3 | (China) Wang Zhiyi | 22 | 16
10 | (Thailand) Pornpawee Chochuwong | 12 | 17
2 | (Japan) Akane Yamaguchi | 21 | 21

Final
1 | (South Korea) An Se-young | 21 | 21
2 | (Japan) Akane Yamaguchi | 17 | 14

=== Top half ===
==== Section 1 ====
First round
1 | (South Korea) An S-y | 21 | 21
(Bulgaria) K Nalbantova | 14 | 13
(Indonesia) T R Wiryawan | 22 | 21
(Peru) I Castillo | 20 | 7
16 | (Denmark) M Blichfeldt | 21 | 21
(Azerbaijan) K F Azzahra | 18 | 4
PFR | (Thailand) B Ongbamrungphan | 22 | 11 | 9
(Thailand) S Katethong | 20 | 21 | 21
5 | (China) Han Y | 20 | 21 | 21
(Scotland) K Gilmour | 22 | 13 | 13
(Germany) Y Li | 21 | 21
(Hungary) Á Kőrösi | 12 | 7
12 | (South Korea) Kim G-e | 21 | 21
(Egypt) N A Youssri | 7 | 5
(Hungary) V Sándorházi | 21 | 21
(Switzerland) M Schnider | 5 | 14

Second round
1 | (South Korea) An S-y | 21 | 21
(Indonesia) T R Wiryawan | 15 | 11
16 | (Denmark) M Blichfeldt | 21 | 11 | 22
(Thailand) S Katethong | 19 | 21 | 20
5 | (China) Han Y | 21 | 21
(Germany) Y Li | 14 | 8
12 | (South Korea) Kim G-e | 24 | 21
(Hungary) V Sándorházi | 22 | 15

Third round
1 | (South Korea) An S-y | 21 | 21
16 | (Denmark) M Blichfeldt | 16 | 10
5 | (China) Han Y | 21 | 20 | 21
12 | (South Korea) Kim G-e | 19 | 22 | 14

Quarter-finals
1 | (South Korea) An S-y | 21 | 21
5 | (China) Han Y | 19 | 12

==== Section 2 ====
First round
3 | (China) Wang ZY | 21 | 21
(United States) B Zhang | 12 | 13
(Malaysia) Letshanaa K | 21 | 21
(Uganda) F M Rafi | 11 | 7
9 | (India) P. V. Sindhu | 21 | 21
(Republic of Ireland) S Noble | 7 | 11
(Bulgaria) S Stoeva | 7 | 19
(Canada) W Zhang | 21 | 21
6 | (Indonesia) P K Wardani | 21 | 21
(Philippines) M de Guzman | 12 | 6
(Italy) Y Hamza | 20 | 21 | 13
(Czech Republic) P Maixnerová | 22 | 16 | 21
15 | (Denmark) L Christophersen | 21 | 21
(Singapore) M Lee | 14 | 7
(Brazil) J V Vieira | 18 | 17
(Hong Kong) Liang K W | 21 | 21

Second round
3 | (China) Wang ZY | 21 | 21
(Malaysia) Letshanaa K | 16 | 9
9 | (India) P. V. Sindhu | 21 | 21
(Canada) W Zhang | 16 | 17
6 | (Indonesia) P K Wardani | 21 | 21
(Czech Republic) P Maixnerová | 9 | 12
15 | (Denmark) L Christophersen | 21 | 21
(Hong Kong) Liang K W | 12 | 15

Third round
3 | (China) Wang ZY | 21 | 15 | 21
9 | (India) P. V. Sindhu | 11 | 21 | 17
6 | (Indonesia) P K Wardani | 18 | 17
15 | (Denmark) L Christophersen | 21 | 21

Quarter-finals
3 | (China) Wang ZY | 21 | 21
15 | (Denmark) L Christophersen | 10 | 7

=== Bottom half ===
==== Section 3 ====
First round
(Chinese Taipei) Lin H-t | 21 | 21
(France) A Tatranova | 13 | 8
(Turkey) Ö Bayrak | 21 | 16 | 9
11 | (Japan) N Okuhara | 18 | 21 | 21
(United States) I Jaiswal | 21 | 21
(Mexico) S Solís | 10 | 5
(Turkey) N Arın | 14 | 10
7 | (Thailand) R Intanon | 21 | 21
(New Zealand) S Li | 18 | 21 | 21
(Switzerland) D Pelupessy | 21 | 12 | 13
(Sri Lanka) R Liyanage | 12 | 16
10 | (Thailand) P Chochuwong | 21 | 21
(United Arab Emirates) P Bharath | 13 | 22 | 14
(Ukraine) P Buhrova | 21 | 20 | 21
(Hong Kong) Lo S Y | 21 | 8 | 11
4 | (China) Chen YF | 18 | 21 | 21

Second round
(Chinese Taipei) Lin H-t | 11 | 16
11 | (Japan) N Okuhara | 21 | 21
(United States) I Jaiswal | 13 | 11
7 | (Thailand) R Intanon | 21 | 7^{r}
(New Zealand) S Li | 13 | 13
10 | (Thailand) P Chochuwong | 21 | 21
(Ukraine) P Buhrova | 18 | 12
4 | (China) Chen YF | 21 | 21

Third round
11 | (Japan) N Okuhara | 21 | 13 | 21
(United States) I Jaiswal | 11 | 21 | 12
10 | (Thailand) P Chochuwong | 15 | 25 | 21
4 | (China) Chen YF | 21 | 23 | 17

Quarter-finals
11 | (Japan) N Okuhara
10 | (Thailand) P Chochuwong | w | / | o

==== Section 4 ====
First round
(Myanmar) Thet Htar T | 20 | 16
(India) U Hooda | 22 | 21
(Chinese Taipei) Chiu P-c | 20 | 12
13 | (Canada) M Li | 22 | 21
(Germany) M Wilson | 12 | 21 | 17
(Ukraine) Y Kantemyr | 21 | 13 | 21
PFR | (Japan) R Gunji | 21 | 14 | 10
8 | (Japan) T Miyazaki | 15 | 21 | 21
(Vietnam) Vũ T T | 21 | 21
(Estonia) K Kuuba | 13 | 9
(Czech Republic) T Švábíková | 17 | 17
14 | (South Korea) Sim Y-j | 21 | 21
(Malaysia) Wong L C | 21 | 21
(Peru) N Miyahira | 10 | 12
(Vietnam) Nguyễn T L | 12 | 10
2 | (Japan) A Yamaguchi | 21 | 21

Second round
(India) U Hooda | 21 | 9 | 21
13 | (Canada) M Li | 11 | 21 | 23
(Ukraine) Y Kantemyr | 14 | 13
8 | (Japan) T Miyazaki | 21 | 21
(Vietnam) Vũ T T | 17 | 21 | 11
14 | (South Korea) Sim Y-j | 21 | 19 | 21
(Malaysia) Wong L C | 18 | 10
2 | (Japan) A Yamaguchi | 21 | 21

Third round
13 | (Canada) M Li | 17 | 21 | 21
8 | (Japan) T Miyazaki | 21 | 16 | 18
14 | (South Korea) Sim Y-j | 17 | 10
2 | (Japan) A Yamaguchi | 21 | 21

Quarter-finals
13 | (Canada) M Li | 17 | 10
2 | (Japan) A Yamaguchi | 21 | 21
