= Liang Xiaoyu (badminton) =

Chinese-born Singaporean badminton player (born 1996)

Liang Xiaoyu 梁晓宇
Personal information
- Born: 11 January 1996 (age 30) Nanjing, Jiangsu, China
- Height: 1.63 m (5 ft 4 in)

Sport
- Country: Singapore
- Sport: Badminton
- Handedness: Right

Women's singles
- Highest ranking: 23 (27 April 2017)
- BWF profile
Medal record
Women's badminton
Representing Singapore
Commonwealth Games
Bronze medal – third place	2014 Glasgow	Mixed team
SEA Games
Bronze medal – third place	2011 Jakarta–Palembang	Women's team
Bronze medal – third place	2015 Singapore	Women's team
Bronze medal – third place	2017 Kuala Lumpur	Women's team
Asian Junior championships
Bronze medal – third place	2014 Taipei	Girls' singles

Liang Xiaoyu (Chinese: 梁晓宇; born 11 January 1996) is a Chinese-born Singaporean former badminton player. She is a one-time Olympian and a former national champion.

== Early life ==
Liang was born on 11 January 1996, in Nanjing, Jiangsu, China. She started playing badminton at a very young age under the influence of her father, a badminton trainer. She began to receive professional badminton training at the age of 7, and later became the champion of the Jiangsu's province junior team. Liang migrated to Singapore with his parents at the age of 10 and became a Singapore citizen in 2011. She became a member of the Singapore national badminton team in May 2011.

== Career ==
Liang is a former national champion, having won the women's singles title at the 2012 edition.

Liang was part of the mixed team that won a bronze medal at the 2014 Commonwealth Games in Glasgow. She represented Singapore at the 2014 Nanjing Youth Olympic Games, where she finished joint 9th in the singles and mixed event. She also clinched a women’s team bronze at the 2011, 2015 and 2017 Southeast Asian Games. She competed at the 2016 Summer Olympics.

On 26 August 2020, Liang announced on her social media that she had decided to retire from competitive badminton. She wrote, "I chose to retire due to injury. Thank you to my relatives and friends who have always supported me. Let's continue to work hard in the future!".

== Awards ==
Liang received the 2017 Meritorious Award from the Singapore National Olympic Committee.

== Achievements ==
=== Asian Junior Championships ===
Girls' singles
Year	Venue	Opponent	Score	Result
2014	Taipei Gymnasium; Taipei, Taiwan	(China) Chen Yufei	10–21, 14–21	Bronze

=== BWF Grand Prix ===
The BWF Grand Prix had two levels, the Grand Prix and Grand Prix Gold. It was a series of badminton tournaments sanctioned by the Badminton World Federation (BWF) and played between 2007 and 2017.

Women's singles
Year	Tournament	Opponent	Score	Result
2015	Thailand Open	(South Korea) Sung Ji-hyun	11–21, 14–21	(silver) Runner-up

BWF Grand Prix Gold tournament
BWF Grand Prix tournament

=== BWF International Challenge/Series ===
Women's singles
Year	Tournament	Opponent	Score	Result
2012	Malaysia International	(Malaysia) Lyddia Cheah	17–21, 12–21	(silver) Runner-up
2015	Malaysia International	(Indonesia) Dinar Dyah Ayustine	21–11, 21–13	(gold) Winner

BWF International Challenge tournament
BWF International Series tournament
