= 2017 BWF World Championships – Women's singles =

Badminton championships

Women's singles at the BWF World Championships
- Venue: Emirates Arena
- Location: Glasgow, Scotland
- Dates: 21–27 August

Medalists
gold medal	Nozomi Okuhara	Japan
silver medal	P. V. Sindhu	India
bronze medal	Chen Yufei	China
bronze medal	Saina Nehwal	India

The women's singles tournament of the 2017 BWF World Championships (World Badminton Championships) took place from 21 to 27 August.

== Seeds ==
The seeding list is based on the World Rankings of Thursday 3 August 2017. The seeds are listed below:

1. (Japan) Akane Yamaguchi (third round)
2. (South Korea) Sung Ji-hyun (third round)
3. (Spain) Carolina Marín (quarterfinals)
4. (India) P. V. Sindhu (final)
5. (China) Sun Yu (quarterfinals)
6. (China) He Bingjiao (third round)
7. (Japan) Nozomi Okuhara (champion)
8. (Thailand) Ratchanok Intanon (quarterfinals)
9. (China) Chen Yufei (semifinals)
10. (Japan) Sayaka Sato (second round)
11. (Japan) Aya Ohori (third round)
12. (India) Saina Nehwal (semifinals)
13. (Hong Kong) Cheung Ngan Yi (third round)
14. (China) Chen Xiaoxin (third round)
15. (Spain) Beatriz Corrales (third round)
16. (Scotland) Kirsty Gilmour (quarterfinals)

Click on the seed number of a player to go to their draw section.

== Draw ==
=== Finals ===
Semifinals
9	(China) Chen Yufei	13	10
4	(India) P. V. Sindhu	21	21
7	(Japan) Nozomi Okuhara	12	21	21
12	(India) Saina Nehwal	21	17	10

Final
4	(India) P. V. Sindhu	19	22	20
7	(Japan) Nozomi Okuhara	21	20	22

=== Section 1 ===
First Round
(Denmark) L Kjaersfeldt	21	21
(Ukraine) M Ulitina	15	19
(Finland) N Vainio	13	11
(Chinese Taipei) Pai Y-p	21	21
(Australia) W Chen	19	11
(Malaysia) Yap R C	21	21
(Canada) M Li	16	21	21
(Bulgaria) L Zetchiri	21	17	16

Second Round
1	(Japan) A Yamaguchi	21	21
(Denmark) L Kjaersfeldt	6	13
9	(China) Chen YF	21	21
(Chinese Taipei) Pai Y-p	13	14
8	(Thailand) R Intanon	21	21
(Malaysia) Yap R C	12	7
14	(China) Chen XX	21	27
(Canada) M Li	13	25

Third Round
1	(Japan) A Yamaguchi	18	19
9	(China) Chen YF	21	21
8	(Thailand) R Intanon	21	21
14	(China) Chen XX	13	9

Quarterfinals
9	(China) Chen YF	14	21	21
8	(Thailand) R Intanon	21	16	12

=== Section 2 ===
First Round
(South Korea) Kim H-m	21	21
(Egypt) H Hosny	2	4
(France) D Lansac	19	16
(Russia) E Kosetskaya	21	21
(Indonesia) L A Mainaky	21	21
(Mauritius) K Foo Kune	11	16
(England) F M Chapman	21	13	9
(Germany) L Heim	17	21	21

Second Round
4	(India) P. V. Sindhu	21	21
(South Korea) Kim H-m	16	14
13	(Hong Kong) Cheung N Y	16	21	21
(Russia) E Kosetskaya	21	9	11
5	(China) Sun Y	21	21
(Indonesia) L A Mainaky	13	9
15	(Spain) B Corrales	21	21
(Germany) L Heim	16	19

Third Round
4	(India) P. V. Sindhu	19	23	21
13	(Hong Kong) Cheung N Y	21	21	17
5	(China) Sun Y	21	19	23
15	(Spain) B Corrales	11	21	21

Quarterfinals
4	(India) P. V. Sindhu	21	21
5	(China) Sun Y	14	9

=== Section 3 ===
First Round
(Bulgaria) M Mitsova	21	21
(Egypt) M El-Tanany	5	2
(Canada) R Honderich	21	21
(United States) I Wang	13	18
(Denmark) M Blichfeldt	21	21
(Germany) F Deprez	10	12
(Hong Kong) Yip P Y	21	21
(Russia) N Perminova	17	18

Second Round
(Bulgaria) M Mitsova	7	15
11	(Japan) A Ohori	21	21
(Canada) R Honderich	10	21	7
7	(Japan) N Okuhara	21	17	21
(Denmark) M Blichfeldt	21	14	21
10	(Japan) S Sato	14	21	18
(Hong Kong) Yip P Y	5	7
3	(Spain) C Marín	21	21

Third Round
11	(Japan) A Ohori	20	15
7	(Japan) N Okuhara	22	21
(Denmark) M Blichfeldt	7	11
3	(Spain) C Marín	21	21

Quarterfinals
7	(Japan) N Okuhara	21	14	21
3	(Spain) C Marín	18	21	15

=== Section 4 ===
First Round
(Finland) A Mikkelä	0^{r}
(India) R Das	2
(Chinese Taipei) Chen S-y	21	21
(Zambia) O Siamupangila	6	8
(Switzerland) S Jaquet	21	18	21
(Ukraine) N Voytsekh	14	21	10
(England) C Birch	21	10	19
(India) T Lad	17	21	21

Second Round
(India) R Das	16	13
16	(Scotland) K Gilmour	21	21
(Chinese Taipei) Chen S-y	8	14
6	(China) He BJ	21	21
(Switzerland) S Jaquet	11	12
12	(India) S Nehwal	21	21
(India) T Lad	9	19
2	(South Korea) Sung J-h	21	21

Third Round
16	(Scotland) K Gilmour	21	15	21
6	(China) He BJ	14	21	16
12	(India) S Nehwal	21	21
2	(South Korea) Sung J-h	19	15

Quarterfinals
16	(Scotland) K Gilmour	19	21	15
12	(India) S Nehwal	21	18	21
