= 2022 BWF World Championships =

2022 Badminton tournament in Japan

Tournament details
- Dates: 22–28 August
- Edition: 27th
- Level: International
- Competitors: 350 from 45 nations
- Venue: Tokyo Metropolitan Gymnasium
- Location: Tokyo, Japan
- Official website: bwfworldchampionships.bwfbadminton.com

The 2022 BWF World Championships (officially known as the TotalEnergies BWF World Championships 2022 for sponsorship reasons) was a badminton tournament which took place from 22 to 28 August 2022 at Tokyo Metropolitan Gymnasium in Tokyo, Japan.

== Host city selection ==
Tokyo was awarded the event in November 2018 during the announcement of 18 major badminton event hosts from 2019 to 2025.

== Medal summary ==
=== Medal table ===
* Host nation (Japan)

2022 BWF World Championships medal table
Rank	Nation	Gold	Silver	Bronze	Total
1	China	2	1	2	5
2	Japan*	1	1	1	3
3	Denmark	1	0	0	1
3	Malaysia	1	0	0	1
5	Indonesia	0	1	1	2
5	South Korea	0	1	1	2
5	Thailand	0	1	1	2
8	Chinese Taipei	0	0	2	2
9	Germany	0	0	1	1
9	India	0	0	1	1
Totals (10 entries)		5	5	10	20

=== Medalists ===
Events	Gold	Silver	Bronze
Men's singles	Viktor Axelsen; Denmark	Kunlavut Vitidsarn; Thailand	Chou Tien-chen; Chinese Taipei
Men's singles	Viktor Axelsen; Denmark	Kunlavut Vitidsarn; Thailand	Zhao Junpeng; China
Women's singles	Akane Yamaguchi; Japan	Chen Yufei; China	An Se-young; South Korea
Women's singles	Akane Yamaguchi; Japan	Chen Yufei; China	Tai Tzu-ying; Chinese Taipei
Men's doubles	Malaysia; Aaron Chia; Soh Wooi Yik	Indonesia; Mohammad Ahsan; Hendra Setiawan	Indonesia; Fajar Alfian; Muhammad Rian Ardianto
Men's doubles	Malaysia; Aaron Chia; Soh Wooi Yik	Indonesia; Mohammad Ahsan; Hendra Setiawan	India; Satwiksairaj Rankireddy; Chirag Shetty
Women's doubles	China; Chen Qingchen; Jia Yifan	South Korea; Kim So-yeong; Kong Hee-yong	Japan; Mayu Matsumoto; Wakana Nagahara
Women's doubles	China; Chen Qingchen; Jia Yifan	South Korea; Kim So-yeong; Kong Hee-yong	Thailand; Puttita Supajirakul; Sapsiree Taerattanachai
Mixed doubles	China; Zheng Siwei; Huang Yaqiong	Japan; Yuta Watanabe; Arisa Higashino	China; Wang Yilyu; Huang Dongping
Mixed doubles	China; Zheng Siwei; Huang Yaqiong	Japan; Yuta Watanabe; Arisa Higashino	Germany; Mark Lamsfuß; Isabel Lohau

== Players ==
=== Number of participants ===
Nation		MS	WS	MD	WD	XD	Total	Number of players
Africa	Egypt	1	1	1		1	4	3
Africa	Mauritius	1					1	1
Asia	China	3	4		4	3	14	20
Asia	Chinese Taipei	2	2	3	1	3	11	14
Asia	Hong Kong	3	2		1	2	8	11
Asia	India	4	2	4	4	2	16	26
Asia	Indonesia	4	2	4	2	3	15	24
Asia	Japan	4	3	4	3	4	18	29
Asia	Malaysia	3	2	4	4	3	16	27
Asia	Maldives				1		1	2
Asia	Myanmar		1				1	1
Asia	Singapore	2		1	1	1	5	7
Asia	South Korea	1	3	2	4	2	12	17
Asia	Sri Lanka	1		1			2	3
Asia	Thailand	3	4	1	3	2	13	17
Asia	Vietnam	1	2				3	3
Europe	Austria	1			1	1	3	4
Europe	Azerbaijan	1					1	1
Europe	Belgium	1	1				2	2
Europe	Bulgaria	1			1		2	3
Europe	Czech Republic	1		2		0.5	3.5	6
Europe	Denmark	4	3	2	1	2	12	17
Europe	England	1		1		1	3	5
Europe	Estonia		1		1		2	3
Europe	Finland	1				0.5	1.5	2
Europe	France	2	2	3	2	3	12	16
Europe	Germany	1	1	2	2	3	9	13
Europe	Ireland	1		1	1		3	5
Europe	Israel	1	1			1	3	3
Europe	Italy				1		1	2
Europe	Netherlands	1		1	1	2	5	7
Europe	Norway			1			1	2
Europe	Portugal	1					1	1
Europe	Scotland		1	2	1	2	6	7
Europe	Slovakia		1				1	1
Europe	Spain	2	1	1			4	5
Europe	Sweden	1			1		2	3
Europe	Ukraine	1	1	1	1		4	6
Oceania	New Zealand	1		1			2	3
Pan Am	Brazil	1		1	1	1	4	5
Pan Am	Canada	1	2		1		4	5
Pan Am	Guatemala	1		1		1	3	4
Pan Am	Mexico	2		1			3	3
Pan Am	Peru				1		1	2
Pan Am	United States	1	2		1	2	6	9
Total (45 NOCs)		62	45	46	46	46	245	350

=== Players participating in two events and more ===
Player	MS	WS	MD	WD	XD
(Austria) Katarina Hochmeir				check	check
(Brazil) Fabrício Farias			check		check
(Brazil) Jaqueline Lima				check	check
(China) Zhang Shuxian				check	check
(Chinese Taipei) Lee Jhe-huei			check		check
(Chinese Taipei) Lee Yang			check		check
(Chinese Taipei) Yang Ching-tun				check	check
(Chinese Taipei) Yang Po-hsuan			check		check
(Egypt) Adham Hatem Elgamal	check		check		check
(Egypt) Doha Hany		check			check
(France) Anne Tran				check	check
(France) Fabien Delrue			check		check
(France) Toma Junior Popov	check		check		
(France) William Villeger			check		check
(Germany) Mark Lamsfuß			check		check
(Germany) Isabel Lohau				check	check
(Germany) Linda Efler				check	check
(Guatemala) Jonathan Solís			check		check
(Israel) Misha Zilberman	check				check
(Mexico) Luis Montoya	check		check		
(Netherlands) Debora Jille				check	check
(Netherlands) Ties van der Lecq			check		check
(Scotland) Adam Hall			check		check
(Scotland) Alexander Dunn			check		check
(Scotland) Ciara Torrance				check	check
(Scotland) Julie MacPherson				check	check
(Singapore) Terry Hee			check		check
(South Korea) Choi Sol-gyu			check		check
(South Korea) Shin Seung-chan				check	check
(South Korea) Seo Seung-jae			check		check
(Thailand) Sapsiree Taerattanachai				check	check
(Thailand) Supak Jomkoh			check		check

== Performance by nation ==
Nation	First Round	Second Round	Third Round	Quarter-finals	Semi-finals	Final	Winner (s)
China	6	14	11	7	5	3	2
Denmark	8	8	3	1	1	1	1
Japan	9	16	10	5	3	2	1
Malaysia	9	13	7	3	1	1	1
South Korea	6	10	6	5	2	1	
Thailand	6	11	9	4	2	1	
Indonesia	10	11	7	4	2	1	
Chinese Taipei	9	8	4	2	2		
India	15	11	7	3	1		
Germany	7	5	2	1	1		
Singapore	5	4	4	1			
Hong Kong	6	7	3	1			
Canada	3	4	1	1			
Spain	3	2	1	1			
England	2	2	1	1			
France	11	5	1				
Scotland	6	4	1				
Netherlands	4	4	1				
United States	5	2	1				
Vietnam	3	2	1				
Bulgaria	1	1	1				
Czech Republic	3.5	2					
Guatemala	3	2					
Brazil	4	1					
Ireland	3	1					
Israel	3	1					
Sweden	2	1					
Mauritius	1	1					
Portugal	1	1					
Slovakia	1	1					
Egypt	4						
Ukraine	4						
Austria	3						
Mexico	3						
Belgium	2						
Estonia	2						
New Zealand	2						
Sri Lanka	2						
Finland	1.5						
Azerbaijan	1						
Italy	1						
Maldives	1						
Myanmar	1						
Norway	1						
Peru	1						
Withdrew	7	5					
Total	192	160	80	40	20	10	5

Some players/pairs started in the second round as a result of receiving a bye in the first round.
