= Chen Yufei =

Chinese badminton player (born 1998)

Chen Yufei 陈雨菲
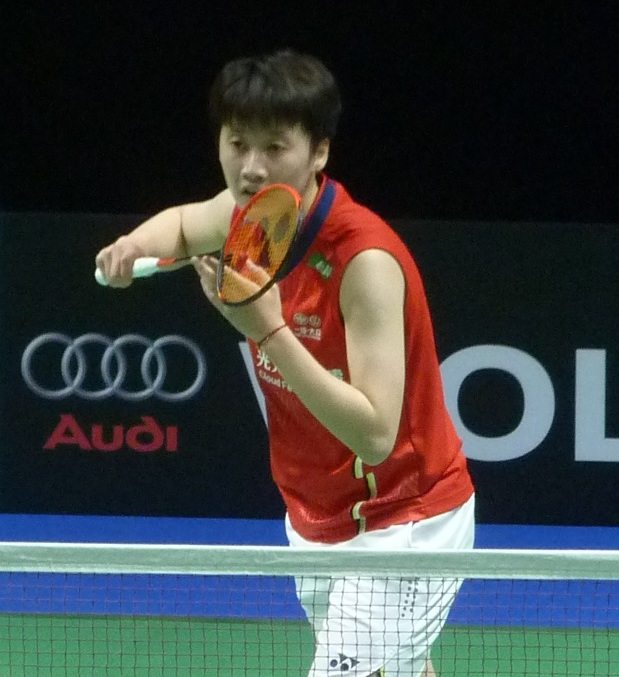
- Chen at the 2022 German Open

Personal information
- Born: 1 March 1998 (age 28) Hangzhou, Zhejiang, China
- Years active: 2013–present
- Height: 1.71 m (5 ft 7 in)

Sport
- Country: China
- Sport: Badminton
- Handedness: Right
- Coached by: Luo Yigang

Women's singles
- Career record: 400 wins, 115 losses
- Highest ranking: 1 (17 December 2019)
- Current ranking: 4 (6 October 2026)
- BWF profile
Medal record
Women's badminton
Representing China
Olympic Games
Gold medal – first place	2020 Tokyo	Women's singles
World Championships
Silver medal – second place	2022 Tokyo	Women's singles
Silver medal – second place	2025 Paris	Women's singles
Bronze medal – third place	2017 Glasgow	Women's singles
Bronze medal – third place	2019 Basel	Women's singles
Bronze medal – third place	2023 Copenhagen	Women's singles
Sudirman Cup
Gold medal – first place	2019 Nanning	Mixed team
Gold medal – first place	2021 Vantaa	Mixed team
Gold medal – first place	2023 Suzhou	Mixed team
Gold medal – first place	2025 Xiamen	Mixed team
Silver medal – second place	2017 Gold Coast	Mixed team
Uber Cup
Gold medal – first place	2020 Aarhus	Women's team
Gold medal – first place	2024 Chengdu	Women's team
Silver medal – second place	2022 Bangkok	Women's team
Silver medal – second place	2026 Horsens	Women's team
Bronze medal – third place	2018 Bangkok	Women's team
Asian Games
Gold medal – first place	2026 Aichi–Nagoya	Women's team
Silver medal – second place	2018 Jakarta–Palembang	Women's team
Silver medal – second place	2022 Hangzhou	Women's singles
Silver medal – second place	2022 Hangzhou	Women's team
Bronze medal – third place	2026 Aichi–Nagoya	Women's singles
Asian Championships
Gold medal – first place	2025 Ningbo	Women's singles
Silver medal – second place	2018 Wuhan	Women's singles
Silver medal – second place	2024 Ningbo	Women's singles
Bronze medal – third place	2019 Wuhan	Women's singles
Bronze medal – third place	2023 Dubai	Women's singles
Asia Mixed Team Championships
Silver medal – second place	2025 Qingdao	Mixed team
Bronze medal – third place	2017 Ho Chi Minh	Mixed team
Asia Team Championships
Gold medal – first place	2016 Hyderabad	Women's team
Silver medal – second place	2018 Alor Setar	Women's team
World Junior Championships
Gold medal – first place	2014 Alor Setar	Mixed team
Gold medal – first place	2015 Lima	Mixed team
Gold medal – first place	2016 Bilbao	Girls' singles
Gold medal – first place	2016 Bilbao	Mixed team
Bronze medal – third place	2013 Bangkok	Mixed team
Asian Youth Games
Bronze medal – third place	2013 Nanjing	Mixed doubles
Asian Junior Championships
Gold medal – first place	2013 Kota Kinabalu	Mixed team
Gold medal – first place	2014 Taipei	Mixed team
Gold medal – first place	2015 Bangkok	Mixed team
Gold medal – first place	2016 Bangkok	Girls' singles
Gold medal – first place	2016 Bangkok	Mixed team
Silver medal – second place	2014 Taipei	Girls' singles

Chen Yufei (Chinese: 陈雨菲; pinyin: Chén Yǔfēi; born 1 March 1998) is a Chinese badminton player. She was the gold medalist in the 2020 Summer Olympics, and also at the 2025 Asian Championships. In her junior career, she won the girls' singles titles at the 2016 Asian and the World Junior Championships. At the same year, Chen clinched her first senior title at the Macau Open. She won a bronze medal at the 2017 World Championships and was awarded as the Eddy Choong Most Promising Player of the Year in 2017. On 17 December 2019, she reached a career-high BWF World Ranking as world number 1, and finished the year as the year-end no.1. Other achievements include winning the World Tour Finals in 2019, silver medals at the 2022 and 2025 BWF World Championships, and also at the 2022 Asian Games.

== Career ==
=== 2014–2016 ===
Chen Yufei did started playing in international level from the year 2013, being aged only 15. In 2014, she won the silver medal in the Asian Junior Championships after being beaten by Akane Yamaguchi in the final. She finished runner-up in the German Junior International event after being beaten by Qin Jinjing in the final. In 2015, she reached the finals of the China International but lost to Nozomi Okuhara. Her first Grand Prix Gold final was at the 2015 Indonesia Masters, in which she reached the final after astounding several seeded players, but lost to her teammate He Bingjiao. In 2016, she won the major junior titles, including the Asian Junior Championships after beating Gregoria Mariska Tunjung in a summit clash, and the BWF World Junior Championships by beating Pornpawee Chochuwong in the final. She also won the 2016 Macau Open Grand Prix Gold in the end of the year by defeating Chen Xiaoxin.

=== 2017 ===
In 2017, Chen reached the final of the Swiss Open and had to settle for second best after losing to the same opponent whom she defeated in Macau Open final in 2016, Chen Xiaoxin. In the 2017 BWF World Championships, the 19-year-old Chen participated as the 9th seed in the tournament. After defeating Pai Yu-po, the lower ranked Chinese Taipei's player in the first round, she set her meeting with the top seeded Akane Yamaguchi. She bulldozed her way through with the 21–18, 21–19 victory and stunned the world. This was not over yet, in the quarter-final, she defeated another higher seeded player, the former world champion Ratchanok Intanon in 3 games and assured herself of first ever medal in this elite event. However, in the semi-final, she lost to P. V. Sindhu and had to satisfy herself with the bronze medal. With her strong performances, she got a ticket to contest in the year-ending Dubai World Superseries Finals. In the group stage, she lost to Tai Tzu-ying (1–2) but won against Sung Ji-hyun (2–0) & Ratchanok Intanon (2–1) which meant she could confirm her place in the semifinal. But again, in the semi-finals, she lost to P. V. Sindhu in straight games.

=== 2018 ===
She contested in the 2018 German Open final but lost to Akane Yamaguchi. She won the silver medal at the 2018 Badminton Asia Championships losing to Tai Tzu-ying in straight games. She fell to her 9th consecutive defeat against Tai Tzu-ying in the final of the Indonesia Open, in which she took the opening game but \wasn't sufficient to beat Tai and lost the next two. In the World Championships, she failed to cross the quarter-final after being downed by Akane Yamaguchi, a player Chen defeated last year in straight games. Akane Yamaguchi again proved difficult for Chen to crack, this time at the Asian games where she lost to her in quarter-finals. In her second Super 1000 final at the China Open, which is the highest level of World tour events in badminton, she lost to the reigning world champion, Carolina Marín, in straight games. At the 2018 Fuzhou China Open, a Super 750 event, she finally broke her jinx of losing in the finals after defeating Nozomi Okuhara tamely with 21–10, 21–16, and thus winning her first ever World tour title. She again qualified for taking part in the season-ending championships, this time renamed as the "World Tour Finals", which was held in her home country China. In the 1st match of the group stage against Ratchanok Intanon, she injured herself in the deciding game and lost the match. She wasn't recovered from that yet but she played the 2nd match against the Canadian Michelle Li & again lost. In the final group match, she twisted her ankle in the very early stage of 1st game which forced her to retire and her overall campaign ended.

=== 2019 ===
2019 proved the best ever year in Chen Yufei's career as she earned multiple titles and honour of becoming the most dominant player of 2019 in her category. Starting with the 2019 All England Open, she defeated Tai Tzu-ying in the final, a player she struggled to beat in her last 11 encounters. Chen finally broke that jinx and won her first super 1000 title. After that, she won the Swiss Open title following her win against Saena Kawakami in the final clash. She competed in the 2019 Badminton Asia Championships as a top seed after defending champion Tai withdrew from the tournament. She made her way to the semifinal and was discomfited by Akane Yamaguchi (1–2), thus claiming the bronze medal. In the 2019 Sudirman Cup, she helped her team to win the record-breaking 11th title, in which she scored a point by defeating Akane Yamaguchi, and eventually Japan was crushed in the final with 3–0 tally by China. Her best form wasn't dipped yet, as she claimed the next title in the Australian Open by totally outplaying Nozomi Okuhara in the final with a very one-sided scoreline 21–15, 21–3. She claimed the Thailand Open title victory by winning against Ratchanok Intanon.

With all her success in 1st half of the year, she was considered as China's best contender for gold in 2019 BWF World Championships in her category. She started well, winning against Pornpawee Chochuwong in round 1, Michelle Li in 2nd round in 3 games. In the quarter-final, she was tested severely by Danish Mia Blichfeldt who once appeared to create an upset by leading 15–12 against her in the decider, but Chen's persistence led her way to the victory and assured her of second medal in this Grade 1 event. In the semifinal her opponent was P. V. Sindhu who had outplayed her in the 2017 World Championships. Chen again proved low against Sindhu in World Championships and was defeated with a big margin 7–21, 14–21. Thus, she again settled for a bronze medal. Leaving her disappointments, she returned very strong and again won series of titles. She won the 2019 Fuzhou China Open again, by beating the same opponent from the last year, Nozomi Okuhara, but this time with tougher opposition. After beating Ratchanok Intanon in the final, she won her 6th World tour title by winning the Hong Kong open. Going into the 2019 BWF World Tour Finals as the best title winning contender, in the group stage, she downed all her opponents P. V. Sindhu (2–1), Akane Yamaguchi (2–0) and He Bingjiao (2–0) to reach the semifinal. She was drawn with Yamaguchi yet again and she displayed a very dominant performance to reach the final. In the final, she showed a great fighting spirit to beat Tai Tzu-ying after being a game down and won the title 12–21, 21–12, 21–17. With her emphatic 7 titles in the year, she became another player from China to become World no. 1 player, as the last time China had the World's top player in Women's singles was in 2015 (Li Xuerui).

=== 2020–2021 ===
Reaching the final yet again, this time at the 2020 Malaysia Masters, she maintained her unbeaten record at the finals since 2018 Fuzhou China Open, and outgunned Tai Tzu-ying for the title in straight games. She reached her second consecutive 2020 All England Open final and faced opposition from the same rival of last year, Tai Tzu-ying. This time she suffered defeat, and was dethroned from the World no. 1 position.

Chen competed at the 2020 Summer Olympics as the number one seed in the women's singles. In the final, she beat Tai Tzu-ying in an extremely intense match 21–18, 19–21, 21–18 to win the gold medal. In October, she helped the Chinese national team to retain the Sudirman Cup.

=== 2022 ===
Chen won the Indonesia Masters in June, defeating Ratchanok Intanon in the final in three games. However, she lost seven finals during this season, including a World Championship loss to Akane Yamaguchi during her career's first final in that event, and three losses to her compatriot He Bingjiao. However, due to her seven final appearances in the World Tour, she qualified for the World Tour Finals as the first seed. Although she suffered a surprise loss against Gregoria Mariska Tunjung, she beat Akane Yamaguchi after 5 straight losses and An Se-young to top the group. However, she could not replicate her group stage performance in the semi-finals, as she lost to Akane Yamaguchi in straight games.

=== 2023 ===
Chen reached the final of the All England Open but lost to An Se-young in a tight three-game battle. She suffered the same fate against An in Asian Championships in Dubai, losing in semifinals and bringing back another bronze. Later, she did flipped the script by helping the national team defend the Sudirman Cup title at home soil after delivering the final win against An Se-young in straight games. In June's Indonesia Open, she defeated another Olympic champion Carolina Marin in straight games to win her first title since last year's Indonesia Masters. She participated at the World Championships but could only settle for a bronze medal as she was defeated by An Se-young in straight games. After helping the national team to win a silver medal at the women's team event at the delayed 2022 Asian Games, she was defeated by An in the final of the singles event in three games, earning another silver medal. Two weeks later, she won the Denmark Open by defeating Marin again in straight games. Chen continued that great form for another week by snatching the French Open title against Tai Tzu-ying. In November, Chen lost the final of the inaugural edition of Japan Masters at the hands of Gregoria Mariska Tunjung in straight sets. The next week, she redeemed herself in China Masters against Han Yue where the final went to the rubber in which Han had to retire due to leg injury.

=== 2024 ===
Chen's first final in the season is in India Open where she lost against Tai Tzu-ying in straight sets. Chen also lost the second final of Asian Championships in her career to her junior compatriot, Wang Zhiyi this time around. In April, Chen helped China to regain the Uber Cup title after losing it back in 2022. Chen continued her losing streak for the world tour this year in Singapore Open in the hands of An Se-young but she ended the streak by winning the Indonesia Open, also against An. Going into Olympics, Chen coming in as the reigning champion and won all her matches in group stage. She got a bye in the next round but later fallen short to He Bingjiao in quarter finals, thus failed to defend her crown. After Chen's defeat in the quarter-finals of the 2024 Olympic Games, she made the decision to take a break from competitive badminton. During her time away, she spent 10 weeks in Australia studying English and regained her motivation.

=== 2025 ===
She made a comeback in the international stage at the 2025 Asia Mixed Team Championships and helps China team won the silver medal. Chen reached the final in the Orléans Masters and quarter-finals in the All England Open losing the match to An Se-young in both occasion. Chen won her first title of the year in the Swiss Open. She finally won the Asian Championships title beating Han Yue in the final.

Chen is a member of 2025 Sudirman Cup China team that manage to win it for the four times in a row since 2019. Chen continuing her uprising form since comeback by winning the 2025 Thailand Open against home favourite and number 1 seed, Pornpawee Chochuwong. Two weeks later, Chen prevailed in 2025 Singapore Open, over Wang Zhiyi in straight sets. In July, Chen got knocked out by An in the quarter-finals for two successive tournaments (Japan Open and China Open) but her luck changed the next week when she won 2025 Macau Open, nine years after she won it first time back in 2016.

In the 2025 BWF World Championships, Chen managed to surpass An in the semi finals in the grueling three games match. Unfortunately, she battled through injury for that win which causing herself to struggle in the final against Akane and ended up losing the match, repeating the feat in 2022.

=== 2026 ===
Chen opened the season with two semi-finals appearances in both the Malaysia and India Open. She continued for third straight weeks in January in which she won the Indonesia Masters against Pitchamon Opatniputh. She played at the Uber Cup in Horsens, winning the silver medal after her team was defeated by South Korea in the final. She then became a finalist in two consecutive tournaments in May, the Thailand Open and Malaysia Masters, losing to Yamaguchi and Intanon respectively in straight games.

== Achievements ==
=== Olympic Games ===
Women's singles
Year	Venue	Opponent	Score	Result	Ref.
2020	Musashino Forest Sport Plaza, Tokyo, Japan	(Chinese Taipei) Tai Tzu-ying	21–18, 19–21, 21–18	Gold	

=== World Championships ===
Women's singles
Year	Venue	Opponent	Score	Result	Ref.
2017	Emirates Arena, Glasgow, Scotland	(India) P. V. Sindhu	13–21, 10–21	Bronze	
2019	St. Jakobshalle, Basel, Switzerland	(India) P. V. Sindhu	7–21, 14–21	Bronze	
2022	Tokyo Metropolitan Gymnasium, Tokyo, Japan	(Japan) Akane Yamaguchi	12–21, 21–10, 14–21	Silver	
2023	Royal Arena, Copenhagen, Denmark	(South Korea) An Se-young	19–21, 15–21	Bronze	
2025	Adidas Arena, Paris, France	(Japan) Akane Yamaguchi	9–21, 13–21	Silver	

=== Asian Games ===
Women's singles
Year	Venue	Opponent	Score	Result	Ref.
2022	Binjiang Gymnasium, Hangzhou, China	(South Korea) An Se-young	18–21, 21–17, 8–21	Silver	
2026	Ichinomiya City Municipal Gymnasium, Ichinomiya, Japan	(South Korea) An Se-young	5–21, 12–21	Bronze	

=== Asian Championships ===
Women's singles
Year	Venue	Opponent	Score	Result	Ref.
2018	Wuhan Sports Center Gymnasium, Wuhan, China	(Chinese Taipei) Tai Tzu-ying	19–21, 20–22	Silver	
2019	Wuhan Sports Center Gymnasium, Wuhan, China	(Japan) Akane Yamaguchi	21–15, 16–21, 17–21	Bronze	
2023	Sheikh Rashid Bin Hamdan Indoor Hall, Dubai, United Arab Emirates	(South Korea) An Se-young	21–16, 11–21, 19–21	Bronze	
2024	Ningbo Olympic Sports Center Gymnasium, Ningbo, China	(China) Wang Zhiyi	19–21, 7–21	Silver	
2025	Ningbo Olympic Sports Center Gymnasium, Ningbo, China	(China) Han Yue	11–21, 21–14, 21–9	Gold	

=== World Junior Championships ===
Girls' singles
Year	Venue	Opponent	Score	Result	Ref.
2016	Bilbao Arena, Bilbao, Spain	(Thailand) Pornpawee Chochuwong	21–14, 21–17	Gold	

=== Asian Youth Games ===
Mixed doubles
Year	Venue	Partner	Opponent	Score	Result	Ref.
2013	Nanjing Sport Institute, Nanjing, China	(China) Shi Yuqi	(Chinese Taipei) Lai Yu-hua (Chinese Taipei) Lee Chia-hsin	21–16, 21–13	Bronze	

=== Asian Junior Championships ===
Girls' singles
Year	Venue	Opponent	Score	Result	Ref.
2014	Taipei Gymnasium, Taipei, China	(Japan) Akane Yamaguchi	10–21, 15–21	Silver	
2016	CPB Badminton Training Center, Bangkok, Thailand	(Indonesia) Gregoria Mariska Tunjung	25–23, 21–14	Gold	

=== BWF World Tour (20 titles, 18 runners-up) ===
The BWF World Tour, which was announced on 19 March 2017 and implemented in 2018, is a series of elite badminton tournaments sanctioned by the Badminton World Federation (BWF). The BWF World Tour is divided into levels of World Tour Finals, Super 1000, Super 750, Super 500, Super 300 (part of the BWF World Tour), and the BWF Tour Super 100.

Women's singles
Year	Tournament	Level	Opponent	Score	Result	Ref.
2018	German Open	Super 300	(Japan) Akane Yamaguchi	19–21, 21–6, 12–21	(silver) Runner-up	
2018	Indonesia Open	Super 1000	(Chinese Taipei) Tai Tzu-ying	23–21, 15–21, 9–21	(silver) Runner-up	
2018	China Open	Super 1000	(Spain) Carolina Marín	18–21, 13–21	(silver) Runner-up	
2018	Fuzhou China Open	Super 750	(Japan) Nozomi Okuhara	21–10, 21–16	(gold) Winner	
2019	All England Open	Super 1000	(Chinese Taipei) Tai Tzu-ying	21–17, 21–17	(gold) Winner	
2019	Swiss Open	Super 300	(Japan) Saena Kawakami	21–9, 21–16	(gold) Winner	
2019	Australian Open	Super 300	(Japan) Nozomi Okuhara	21–15, 21–3	(gold) Winner	
2019	Thailand Open	Super 500	(Thailand) Ratchanok Intanon	22–20, 21–18	(gold) Winner	
2019	Fuzhou China Open	Super 750	(Japan) Nozomi Okuhara	9–21, 21–12, 21–18	(gold) Winner	
2019	Hong Kong Open	Super 500	(Thailand) Ratchanok Intanon	21–18, 13–21, 21–13	(gold) Winner	
2019	BWF World Tour Finals	World Tour Finals	(Chinese Taipei) Tai Tzu-ying	12–21, 21–12, 21–17	(gold) Winner	
2020	Malaysia Masters	Super 500	(Chinese Taipei) Tai Tzu-ying	21–17, 21–10	(gold) Winner	
2020	All England Open	Super 1000	(Chinese Taipei) Tai Tzu-ying	19–21, 15–21	(silver) Runner-up	
2022	German Open	Super 300	(China) He Bingjiao	14–21, 25–27	(silver) Runner-up	
2022	Korea Masters	Super 300	(China) He Bingjiao	14–21, 21–14, 9–21	(silver) Runner-up	
2022	Thailand Open	Super 500	(Chinese Taipei) Tai Tzu-ying	15–21, 21–17, 12–21	(silver) Runner-up	
2022	Indonesia Masters	Super 500	(Thailand) Ratchanok Intanon	21–16, 18–21, 21–15	(gold) Winner	
2022	Malaysia Open	Super 750	(Thailand) Ratchanok Intanon	15–21, 21–13, 16–21	(silver) Runner-up	
2022	Malaysia Masters	Super 500	(South Korea) An Se-young	17–21, 5–21	(silver) Runner-up	
2022	Denmark Open	Super 750	(China) He Bingjiao	20–22, 21–12, 10–21	(silver) Runner-up	
2023	All England Open	Super 1000	(South Korea) An Se-young	17–21, 21–10, 19–21	(silver) Runner-up	
2023	Indonesia Open	Super 1000	(Spain) Carolina Marín	21–18, 21–19	(gold) Winner	
2023	Denmark Open	Super 750	(Spain) Carolina Marín	21–14, 21–19	(gold) Winner	
2023	French Open	Super 750	(Chinese Taipei) Tai Tzu-ying	21–17, 22–20	(gold) Winner	
2023	Japan Masters	Super 500	(Indonesia) Gregoria Mariska Tunjung	12–21, 12–21	(silver) Runner-up	
2023	China Masters	Super 750	(China) Han Yue	18–21, 21–4, 0–0 retired	(gold) Winner	
2024	India Open	Super 750	(Chinese Taipei) Tai Tzu-ying	16–21, 12–21	(silver) Runner-up	
2024	Singapore Open	Super 750	(South Korea) An Se-young	19–21, 21–16, 12–21	(silver) Runner-up	
2024	Indonesia Open	Super 1000	(South Korea) An Se-young	21–14, 14–21, 21–18	(gold) Winner	
2025	Orléans Masters	Super 300	(South Korea) An Se-young	14–21, 15–21	(silver) Runner-up	
2025	Swiss Open	Super 300	(Denmark) Line Kjærsfeldt	21–17, 21–17	(gold) Winner	
2025	Thailand Open	Super 500	(Thailand) Pornpawee Chochuwong	21–16, 21–12	(gold) Winner	
2025	Singapore Open	Super 750	(China) Wang Zhiyi	21–11, 21–11	(gold) Winner	
2025	Macau Open	Super 300	(Denmark) Line Christophersen	21–17, 21–17	(gold) Winner	
2026	Indonesia Masters	Super 500	(Thailand) Pitchamon Opatniputh	23–21, 21–13	(gold) Winner	
2026	Thailand Open	Super 500	(Japan) Akane Yamaguchi	14–21, 18–21	(silver) Runner-up	
2026	Malaysia Masters	Super 500	(Thailand) Ratchanok Intanon	17–21, 15–21	(silver) Runner-up	
2026	China Open	Super 1000	(Japan) Akane Yamaguchi	18–21, 16–21	(silver) Runner-up	

=== BWF Grand Prix (1 title, 2 runners-up) ===
The BWF Grand Prix had two levels, the Grand Prix and Grand Prix Gold. It was a series of badminton tournaments sanctioned by the Badminton World Federation (BWF) and played between 2007 and 2017.

Women's singles
Year	Tournament	Opponent	Score	Result	Ref.
2015	Indonesian Masters	(China) He Bingjiao	18–21, 9–21	(silver) Runner-up	
2016	Macau Open	(China) Chen Xiaoxin	21–13, 21–18	(gold) Winner	
2017	Swiss Open	(China) Chen Xiaoxin	19–21, 14–21	(silver) Runner-up	

BWF Grand Prix Gold tournament
BWF Grand Prix tournament

=== BWF International Challenge/Series (1 runner-up) ===
Women's singles
Year	Tournament	Opponent	Score	Result	Ref.
2015	China International	(Japan) Nozomi Okuhara	19–21, 16–21	(silver) Runner-up	

BWF International Challenge tournament
BWF International Series tournament

== Performance timeline ==
Key

W	Won	F	Finalist	SF	Semi-finalist
QF	Quarter-finalist	#R	Rounds 4, 3, 2, 1	RR	Round-robin stage
Q#	Qualification round	A	Absent	w/d	Withdrew
G	Gold	S	Silver	B	Bronze
NH	Not held	N/A	Not applicable	DNQ	Did not qualify

=== National team ===
- Junior level

Team events	2013	2014	2015	2016
Asian Junior Championships	G	G	G	G
World Junior Championships	B	G	G	G

- Senior level

Team events	2016	2017	2018	2019	2020	2021	2022	2023	2024	2025	2026	Ref
Asia Team Championships	G	NH	S	NH	A	NH	A	NH	A	NH		
Asia Mixed Team Championships	NH	B	NH	A	NH			A	NH	S	NH	
Asian Games	NH		S	NH			S	NH			G	
Uber Cup	A	NH	B	NH	G	NH	S	NH	G	NH	S	
Sudirman Cup	NH	S	NH	G	NH	G	NH	G	NH	G	NH	

=== Individual competitions ===
==== Junior level ====
- Girls' singles

Events	2013	2014	2015	2016	Ref
Asian Junior Championships	3R	S	3R	G	
Asian Youth Games	QF	NH			
World Junior Championships	4R	3R	QF	G	

- Mixed doubles

Events	2013	Ref
Asian Youth Games	B	

==== Senior level ====
- Women's singles

Events	2017	2018	2019	2020	2021	2022	2023	2024	2025	2026	Ref
Asian Championships	QF	S	B	NH		A	B	S	G	w/d	
Asian Games	NH	QF	NH			S	NH			B	
World Championships	B	QF	B	NH	A	S	B	NH	S	3R	
Olympic Games	NH			G	NH			QF	NH		

Tournament	BWF Superseries / Grand Prix				BWF World Tour									Best	Ref
Tournament	2014	2015	2016	2017	2018	2019	2020	2021	2022	2023	2024	2025	2026	Best	Ref
Malaysia Open	A			QF	1R	SF	NH		F	SF	SF	A	SF	F ('22)	
India Open	A						NH		A	QF	F	A	SF	F ('24)	
Indonesia Masters	A	F	2R	NH	1R	SF	1R	A	W	w/d	w/d	A	W	W ('22, '26)	
Thailand Masters	NH		A	SF	A			NH		A				SF ('17)	
German Open	A				F	A	NH		F	SF	A			F ('18, '22)	
All England Open	A			2R	SF	W	F	A	SF	F	QF	QF	SF	W ('19)	
Swiss Open	A			F	A	W	NH	A	w/d	A		W	A	W ('19, '25)	
Orléans Masters	A						NH	A				F	A	F ('25)	
Thailand Open	NH	2R	A			W	A	NH	F	w/d	A	W	F	W ('19, '25)	
Malaysia Masters	A		2R	A	QF	A	W	NH	F	A		w/d	F	W ('20)	
Singapore Open	A			2R	A		NH		w/d	SF	F	W	SF	W ('25)	
Indonesia Open	A			1R	F	SF	NH	A	SF	W	W	QF	SF	W ('23, '24)	
Australian Open	A			QF	A	W	NH		A					W ('19)	
Macau Open	1R	QF	W	A			NH				A	W	A	W ('16, '25)	
Japan Open	A		2R	SF	SF	SF	NH		SF	2R	A	QF	SF	SF ('17, '18, '19, '22, '26)	
China Open	A		2R	1R	F	SF	NH			SF	A	QF	F	F ('18, '26)	
Chinese Taipei Open	A		QF	A			NH		A					QF ('16)	
Korea Masters	A						NH		F	A				F ('22)	
China Masters	A	SF	SF	QF	W	W	NH			W	A	QF	w/d	W ('18, '19, '23)	
Denmark Open	A			SF	QF	SF	A	w/d	F	W	A	2R	A	W ('23)	
French Open	A			QF	SF	w/d	NH	A	2R	W	SF	SF	A	W ('23)	
Korea Open	A		QF	A		QF	NH		2R	SF	A			SF ('23)	
Japan Masters	NH									F	A		SF	F ('23)	
Hong Kong Open	A			QF	1R	W	NH			A			2R	W ('19)	
Superseries / Tour Finals	DNQ			SF	RR	W	DNQ		SF	SF	DNQ			W ('19)	
New Zealand Open	A	2R	QF	A			NH			N/A				QF ('16)	
Year-end ranking	491	50	18	8	4	1	2	3	3	2	4	4		1	
Tournament	2014	2015	2016	2017	2018	2019	2020	2021	2022	2023	2024	2025	2026	Best	Ref

== Record against selected opponents ==
Record against year-end Finals finalists, World Championships semi-finalists, and Olympic quarter-finalists. Accurate as of 2025 French Open.

Players	Matches	Results		Difference
Players	Matches	Won	Lost	Difference
(China) Han Yue	8	8	0	+8
(China) He Bingjiao	16	8	8	0
(China) Wang Shixian	1	0	1	–1
(China) Wang Zhiyi	10	9	1	+8
(China) Zhang Yiman	6	6	0	+6
(Chinese Taipei) Tai Tzu-ying	27	8	19	–11
(Hong Kong) Yip Pui Yin	2	2	0	+2
(India) Saina Nehwal	5	4	1	+3
(India) P. V. Sindhu	12	6	6	0
(Indonesia) Lindaweni Fanetri	1	0	1	–1
(Indonesia) Gregoria Mariska Tunjung	14	11	3	+8 (Note: Tournament software did not included the women's team event of the 2022 Asian Games results for head-to-head (Chen won against Tunjung 21–14, 21–12).)

Players	Matches	Results		Difference
Players	Matches	Won	Lost	Difference
(Indonesia) Putri Kusuma Wardani	3	3	0	+4
(Japan) Minatsu Mitani	1	0	1	–1
(Japan) Aya Ohori	14	14	0	+14 (Note: Tournament software did not included the women's team event of the 2022 Asian Games results for head-to-head (Chen won against Ohori 21–19, 12–21, 21–15).)
(Japan) Nozomi Okuhara	15	11	4	+7
(Japan) Akane Yamaguchi	36	14	22	–8
(South Korea) An Se-young	28	14	14	0 (Note: Tournament software did not included the women's team event of the 2022 Asian Games results for head-to-head (Chen lost to An 12–21, 13–21).)
(South Korea) Bae Yeon-ju	2	2	0	+2
(South Korea) Sung Ji-hyun	11	10	1	+9
(Spain) Carolina Marín	13	7	6	+1
(Thailand) Ratchanok Intanon	21	18	3	+15
