= 2025 BWF World Championships – Women's singles =

Badminton championships

Women's singles at the 2025 BWF World Championships
- Venue: Adidas Arena
- Location: Paris, France
- Dates: 26–31 August
- Competitors: 64 from 40 nations

Medalists
gold medal	Akane Yamaguchi	Japan
silver medal	Chen Yufei	China
bronze medal	An Se-young	South Korea
bronze medal	Putri Kusuma Wardani	Indonesia

The women's singles tournament of the 2025 BWF World Championships took place from 26 to 31 August 2025 at the Adidas Arena in Paris.

== Seeds ==
The seeding list was based on the World Rankings of 1 August 2025.

1. (South Korea) An Se-young (semi-finals)
2. (China) Wang Zhiyi (third round)
3. (China) Han Yue (quarter-finals)
4. (China) Chen Yufei (final)
5. (Japan) Akane Yamaguchi (champion)
6. (Thailand) Pornpawee Chochuwong (quarter-finals)
7. (Indonesia) Gregoria Mariska Tunjung (third round)
8. (Japan) Tomoka Miyazaki (third round)

9. (Indonesia) Putri Kusuma Wardani (semi-finals)
10. (Thailand) Ratchanok Intanon (first round)
11. (Thailand) Supanida Katethong (third round)
12. (South Korea) Sim Yu-jin (quarter-finals)
13. (Singapore) Yeo Jia Min (second round)
14. (China) Gao Fangjie (third round)
15. (India) P. V. Sindhu (quarter-finals)
16. (Canada) Michelle Li (third round)

Click on the seed number of a player to go to their draw section.

== Draw ==
The drawing ceremony was held on 10 August.

=== Finals ===
Semi-finals
1	(South Korea) An Se-young	15	17
4	(China) Chen Yufei	21	21
5	(Japan) Akane Yamaguchi	21	14	21
9	(Indonesia) Putri Kusuma Wardani	17	21	6

Final
4	(China) Chen Yufei	9	13
5	(Japan) Akane Yamaguchi	21	21

=== Top half ===
==== Section 1 ====
First round
1	(South Korea) An S-y	21	21
(Belgium) C Lassaux	5	8
(Peru) I Castillo	30	14	9
(Germany) Y Li	28	21	21
16	(Canada) M Li	21	21
(Japan) N Nidaira	15	14
(Turkey) Ö Bayrak	21	21
(Australia) T Ho	10	14
7	(Indonesia) G M Tunjung	21	21
(Czech Republic) P Maixnerová	10	9
(Switzerland) M Schnider	10	16
(Denmark) J D Jakobsen	21	21
12	(South Korea) Sim Y-j	21	21
(Canada) WY Zhang	19	14
(Sri Lanka) R Liyanage	19	21	11
(Republic of Ireland) R Darragh	21	11	3^{r}

Second round
1	(South Korea) An S-y	21	21
(Germany) Y Li	15	7
16	(Canada) M Li	21	17	21
(Turkey) Ö Bayrak	14	21	10
7	(Indonesia) G M Tunjung	21	21
(Denmark) J D Jakobsen	17	8
12	(South Korea) Sim Y-j	21	21
(Sri Lanka) R Liyanage	14	16

Third round
1	(South Korea) An S-y	21	21
16	(Canada) M Li	18	10
7	(Indonesia) G M Tunjung	15	18
12	(South Korea) Sim Y-j	21	21

Quarter-finals
1	(South Korea) An S-y	21	21
12	(South Korea) Sim Y-j	10	6

==== Section 2 ====
First round
4	(China) Chen YF	21	21
(France) A Tatranova	10	12
(Denmark) M Blichfeldt	21	21
(Chinese Taipei) Sung S-y	9	19
10	(Thailand) R Intanon	17	18
(Vietnam) Nguyễn T L	21	21
(Uganda) F M Rafi	12	5
(Scotland) K Gilmour	21	21
6	(Thailand) P Chochuwong	21	21
(Singapore) J Hooi	14	8
(Bulgaria) S Stoeva	19	21	20
(United States) I Jaiswal	21	15	22
13	(Singapore) Yeo J M	21	21
(Myanmar) Thet Htar T	7	10
(Thailand) B Ongbamrungphan	21	21
(Czech Republic) T Švábíková	12	8

Second round
4	(China) Chen YF	21	16	21
(Denmark) M Blichfeldt	13	21	10
(Vietnam) Nguyễn T L	21	23
(Scotland) K Gilmour	17	21
6	(Thailand) P Chochuwong	21	21
(United States) I Jaiswal	13	13
13	(Singapore) Yeo J M	17	20
(Thailand) B Ongbamrungphan	21	22

Third round
4	(China) Chen YF	21	21
(Vietnam) Nguyễn T L	10	9
6	(Thailand) P Chochuwong	21	21
(Thailand) B Ongbamrungphan	10	11

Quarter-finals
4	(China) Chen YF	22	21
6	(Thailand) P Chochuwong	20	14

=== Bottom half ===
==== Section 3 ====
First round
(Estonia) K Kuuba	10	19
(Denmark) L Kjærsfeldt	21	21
(Germany) M Wilson	13	8
11	(Thailand) S Katethong	21	21
(Ukraine) P Buhrova	12	10
(South Korea) Kim G-e	21	21
(Australia) K Q Teoh	7	2
5	(Japan) A Yamaguchi	21	21
(Ukraine) Y Kantemyr	20	8
(Vietnam) Vũ T T	22	21
(Malaysia) Goh J W	14	9
14	(China) Gao FJ	21	21
(United States) BW Zhang	21	21
(Italy) Y Hamza	10	13
(Chinese Taipei) Chiu P-c	10	16
3	(China) Han Y	21	21

Second round
(Denmark) L Kjærsfeldt	21	20	19
11	(Thailand) S Katethong	14	22	21
(South Korea) Kim G-e	19	19
5	(Japan) A Yamaguchi	21	21
(Vietnam) Vũ T T	17	18
14	(China) Gao FJ	21	21
(United States) BW Zhang	22	13
3	(China) Han Y	24	21

Third round
11	(Thailand) S Katethong	11	17
5	(Japan) A Yamaguchi	21	21
14	(China) Gao FJ	14	19
3	(China) Han Y	21	21

Quarter-finals
5	(Japan) A Yamaguchi	21	21
3	(China) Han Y	5	19

==== Section 4 ====
First round
(Brazil) J V Vieira	21	21
(Azerbaijan) K F Azzahra	16	14
(Hong Kong) Lo S Y	18	11
9	(Indonesia) P K Wardani	21	21
(Hungary) V Sándorházi	22	15	12
(Chinese Taipei) Hsu W-c	20	21	21
(Turkey) N Arın	21	12	14
8	(Japan) T Miyazaki	16	21	21
(Hong Kong) S S Mehta	18	8
(Malaysia) Letshanaa K	21	21
(Bulgaria) K Nalbantova	21	6
15	(India) P. V. Sindhu	23	21
(Spain) C Azurmendi	14	16
(Chinese Taipei) Lin H-t	21	21
(Hungary) Á Kőrösi	5	4
2	(China) Wang ZY	21	21

Second round
(Brazil) J V Vieira	15	11
9	(Indonesia) P K Wardani	21	21
(Chinese Taipei) Hsu W-c	10	21	10
8	(Japan) T Miyazaki	21	13	21
(Malaysia) Letshanaa K	19	15
15	(India) P. V. Sindhu	21	21
(Chinese Taipei) Lin H-t	18	7
2	(China) Wang ZY	21	21

Third round
9	(Indonesia) P K Wardani	21	21
8	(Japan) T Miyazaki	12	11
15	(India) P. V. Sindhu	21	21
2	(China) Wang ZY	19	15

Quarter-finals
9	(Indonesia) P K Wardani	21	13	21
15	(India) P. V. Sindhu	14	21	16

== Qualifiers' performances ==
The table below lists out all the qualifiers of this edition by 26 July 2025.

Qualifier	Date of birth	Appearance	Best Performance(s)		Note
Qualifier	Date of birth	Appearance	Edition(s)	Result	Note
Champion
(Japan) Akane Yamaguchi	6 June 1997 (aged 28)	6th	21, 22	G	=PB
Finalist
(China) Chen Yufei	1 March 1998 (aged 27)	5th	22	S	=PB
Semi-finalist
(South Korea) An Se-young	5 February 2002 (aged 23)	3rd	23	G	
(Indonesia) Putri Kusuma Wardani	20 July 2002 (aged 23)	3rd	23	2R	PB
Quarter-finalist
(South Korea) Sim Yu-jin	13 May 1999 (aged 26)	Debut			PB
(Thailand) Pornpawee Chochuwong	22 January 1998 (aged 27)	5th	21, 22, 23	3R	PB
(China) Han Yue	18 November 1999 (aged 25)	5th	21, 22	QF	=PB
(India) P. V. Sindhu	5 July 1995 (aged 30)	9th	19	G	
Third rounder
(Canada) Michelle Li	3 November 1991 (aged 33)	11th	22	QF	Most participated qualifier
(Indonesia) Gregoria Mariska Tunjung	11 August 1999 (aged 26)	5th	23	QF	
(Vietnam) Nguyễn Thùy Linh	20 November 1997 (aged 27)	6th	18	3R	=PB
(Thailand) Busanan Ongbamrungphan	22 March 1996 (aged 29)	8th	22	QF	
(Thailand) Supanida Katethong	26 October 1997 (aged 27)	Debut			PB
(China) Gao Fangjie	29 September 1998 (aged 26)	Debut			PB
(Japan) Tomoka Miyazaki	17 August 2006 (aged 19)	Debut			PB
(China) Wang Zhiyi	29 April 2000 (aged 25)	4th	23	QF	
Second rounder
(Germany) Yvonne Li	30 May 1998 (aged 27)	5th	21, 22, 23	2R	=PB
(Turkey) Özge Bayrak	14 February 1992 (aged 33)	2nd	15	2R	=PB
(Denmark) Julie Dawall Jakobsen	25 March 1998 (aged 27)	2nd	21	2R	=PB
(Sri Lanka) Ranithma Liyanage	22 March 2007 (aged 18)	Debut			Youngest qualifier, PB
(Denmark) Mia Blichfeldt	19 August 1997 (aged 28)	7th	19	QF	
(Scotland) Kirsty Gilmour	21 September 1993 (aged 31)	10th	17	QF	
(United States) Ishika Jaiswal	28 July 2003 (aged 22)	Debut			PB
(Singapore) Yeo Jia Min	1 February 1999 (aged 26)	4th	19	QF	
(Denmark) Line Kjærsfeldt	20 April 1994 (aged 31)	10th	14, 15, 17, 19, 21, 23	2R	=PB
(South Korea) Kim Ga-eun	7 February 1998 (aged 27)	5th	19, 21	3R	
(Vietnam) Vũ Thị Trang	19 May 1992 (aged 33)	7th	14, 19, 22	3R	
(United States) Beiwen Zhang	12 July 1990 (aged 35)	5th	18, 19, 22, 23	3R	Oldest participated qualifier
(Brazil) Juliana Viana Vieira	23 September 2004 (aged 20)	2nd	23	2R	Reigning Pan American champion, =PB
(Chinese Taipei) Hsu Wen-chi	28 September 1997 (aged 27)	2nd	23	2R	=PB
(Malaysia) Letshanaa Karupathevan	19 August 2003 (aged 22)	Debut			PB
(Chinese Taipei) Lin Hsiang-ti	20 November 1998 (aged 26)	Debut			PB
First rounder
(Belgium) Clara Lassaux	4 October 2001 (aged 23)	Debut			PB
(Peru) Inés Castillo	7 December 1999 (aged 25)	2nd	23	1R	=PB
(Japan) Natsuki Nidaira	12 July 1998 (aged 27)	Debut			PB
(Australia) Tiffany Ho	6 January 1998 (aged 27)	2rd	23	1R	=PB
(Czech Republic) Petra Maixnerová	6 September 2005 (aged 19)	Debut			PB
(Switzerland) Milena Schnider	11 October 2001 (aged 23)	Debut			PB
(Canada) Wenyu Zhang	29 August 2002 (aged 22)	3rd	22	2R	
(Republic of Ireland) Rachael Darragh	24 September 1997 (aged 27)	3rd	23	2R	
(France) Anna Tatranova	12 October 2003 (aged 21)	Debut			PB
(Chinese Taipei) Sung Shuo-yun	15 June 1997 (aged 28)	Debut			PB
(Thailand) Ratchanok Intanon	28 February 1995 (aged 30)	11th	13	G	Youngest winner record holder, and most participated qualifier
(Uganda) Fadilah Mohamed Rafi	6 April 2005 (aged 20)	Debut			PB
(Singapore) Jaslyn Hooi	5 October 2000 (aged 24)	Debut			PB
(Bulgaria) Stefani Stoeva	23 September 1995 (aged 29)	Debut			PB
(Myanmar) Thet Htar Thuzar	15 March 1999 (aged 26)	4th	23	3R	
(Czech Republic) Tereza Švábíková	14 May 2000 (aged 25)	Debut			PB
(Estonia) Kristin Kuuba	15 February 1997 (aged 28)	5th	19,21,22,23	1R	=PB
(Germany) Miranda Wilson	6 April 2000 (aged 25)	Debut			PB
(Ukraine) Polina Buhrova	30 January 2004 (aged 21)	2nd	23	1R	=PB
(Australia) Kai Qi Teoh	4 October 2003 (aged 21)	Debut			PB
(Ukraine) Yevheniia Kantemyr	4 July 2005 (aged 20)	Debut			PB
(Malaysia) Goh Jin Wei	30 January 2000 (aged 25)	3th	22	3R	
(Italy) Yasmine Hamza	16 September 2003 (aged 21)	Debut			PB
(Chinese Taipei) Chiu Pin-chian	15 May 1999 (aged 26)	Debut			PB
(Azerbaijan) Keisha Fatimah Azzahra	12 August 2003 (aged 22)	Debut			PB
(Hong Kong) Lo Sin Yan	25 February 2003 (aged 22)	Debut			PB
(Hungary) Vivien Sandorhazi	3 January 2001 (aged 24)	2rd	23	1R	=PB
(Turkey) Neslihan Arın	26 February 1994 (aged 31)	8th	11,21,23	2R	
(Hong Kong) Saloni Samirbhai Mehta	27 August 2002 (aged 22)	Debut			PB
(Bulgaria) Kaloyana Nalbantova	6 March 2006 (aged 19)	Debut			PB
(Spain) Clara Azurmendi	4 May 1998 (aged 27)	3rd	21,23	1R	=PB
(Hungary) Ágnes Kőrösi	4 May 1998 (aged 27)	Debut			PB
