= 2023 BWF World Championships – Women's singles =

Badminton championships

Women's singles at the 2023 BWF World Championships
- Venue: Royal Arena
- Location: Copenhagen, Denmark
- Dates: 21–27 August
- Competitors: 48 from 30 nations

Medalists
gold medal	An Se-young	South Korea
silver medal	Carolina Marín	Spain
bronze medal	Chen Yufei	China
bronze medal	Akane Yamaguchi	Japan

The women's singles tournament of the 2023 BWF World Championships took place from 21 to 27 August 2023 at the Royal Arena in Copenhagen.

Akane Yamaguchi was the two-time defending champion, but lost to Carolina Marin in the semi-finals.

== Seeds ==
The seeding list was based on the World Rankings of 1 August 2023.

1. (South Korea) An Se-young (champion)
2. (Japan) Akane Yamaguchi (semi-finals)
3. (China) Chen Yufei (semi-finals)
4. (Chinese Taipei) Tai Tzu-ying (quarter-finals)
5. (China) He Bingjiao (third round)
6. (Spain) Carolina Marín (final)
7. (Thailand) Ratchanok Intanon (third round)
8. (Indonesia) Gregoria Mariska Tunjung (quarter-finals)

9. (China) Han Yue (third round)
10. (China) Wang Zhiyi (quarter-finals)
11. (Thailand) Pornpawee Chochuwong (third round)
12. (United States) Beiwen Zhang (third round)
13. (Thailand) Busanan Ongbamrungphan (third round)
14. (Canada) Michelle Li (second round)
15. (Denmark) Mia Blichfeldt (third round)
16. (India) P. V. Sindhu (second round)

Click on the seed number of a player to go to their draw section.

== Draw ==
The drawing ceremony was held on 10 August 2023.

=== Finals ===
Semi-finals
1	(South Korea) An Se-young	21	21
3	(China) Chen Yufei	19	15
6	(Spain) Carolina Marín	23	21
2	(Japan) Akane Yamaguchi	21	13

Final
1	(South Korea) An Se-young	21	21
6	(Spain) Carolina Marín	12	10

=== Top half ===
==== Section 1 ====
First round
(Hungary) V Sándorházi	18	15
(Malaysia) Goh J W	21	21
(Scotland) K Gilmour	22	9	21
(Belgium) L Tan	20	21	12
(Chinese Taipei) Hsu W-c	21	23
(Spain) C Azurmendi	10	21
(Vietnam) Nguyễn T L	15	12
(Japan) N Okuhara	21	21

Second round
1	(South Korea) An S-y	21	21
(Malaysia) Goh J W	12	14
12	(United States) BW Zhang	21	21
(Scotland) K Gilmour	18	14
7	(Thailand) R Intanon	21	21
(Chinese Taipei) Hsu W-c	19	19
16	(India) P. V. Sindhu	14	14
(Japan) N Okuhara	21	21

Third round
1	(South Korea) An S-y	21	21
12	(United States) BW Zhang	19	13
7	(Thailand) R Intanon	19	16
(Japan) N Okuhara	21	21

Quarter-finals
1	(South Korea) An S-y	16	21	21
(Japan) N Okuhara	21	10	11

==== Section 2 ====
First round
(Malaysia) Kisona S	22	19	13
(Chinese Taipei) Pai Y-p	20	21	21
(Republic of Ireland) R Darragh	21	21
(Egypt) D Hany	11	14
(Ukraine) P Buhrova	7	21
(Indonesia) P K Wardani	21	23
(Germany) Y Li	21	21
(France) L Huet	13	12

Second round
3	(China) Chen YF	21	21
(Chinese Taipei) Pai Y-p	14	13
15	(Denmark) M Blichfeldt	21	21
(Republic of Ireland) R Darragh	14	17
5	(China) He BJ	18	21	21
(Indonesia) P K Wardani	21	19	17
10	(China) Wang ZY	21	21
(Germany) Y Li	18	11

Third round
3	(China) Chen YF	21	21
15	(Denmark) M Blichfeldt	12	13
5	(China) He BJ	21	7	14
10	(China) Wang ZY	13	21	21

Quarter-finals
3	(China) Chen YF	21	21
10	(China) Wang ZY	17	12

=== Bottom half ===
==== Section 3 ====
First round
(Myanmar) Thet Htar T	21	21
(Mexico) H Gaitán	13	19
(Switzerland) J Stadelmann	13	13
(United States) I Wang	21	21
(Brazil) J Vieira	21	19	21
(Singapore) K Insyirah	9	21	14
(Denmark) L Christophersen	21	21
(Peru) I Castillo	15	15

Second round
(Myanmar) Thet Htar T	4
14	(Canada) M Li	2^{r}
(United States) I Wang	10	6
6	(Spain) C Marín	21	21
(Brazil) J Vieira	22	14
11	(Thailand) P Chochuwong	24	21
(Denmark) L Christophersen	16	13
4	(Chinese Taipei) Tai T-y	21	21

Third round
(Myanmar) Thet Htar T	10	18
6	(Spain) C Marín	21	21
11	(Thailand) P Chochuwong	18	17
4	(Chinese Taipei) Tai T-y	21	21

Quarter-finals
6	(Spain) C Marín	21	21
4	(Chinese Taipei) Tai T-y	16	14

==== Section 4 ====
First round
(Canada) WY Zhang	10	9
(Denmark) L Kjærsfeldt	21	21
(Singapore) Yeo J M	w	/	o
(France) Qi XF
(Estonia) K Kuuba	21	14	16
(South Korea) Kim G-e	19	21	21
(Australia) T Ho	17	17
(Turkey) N Arın	21	21

Second round
(Denmark) L Kjærsfeldt	13	21	14
9	(China) Han Y	21	14	21
(Singapore) Yeo J M	10	24	14
8	(Indonesia) G M Tunjung	21	22	21
(South Korea) Kim G-e	21	18	16
13	(Thailand) B Ongbamrungphan	15	21	21
(Turkey) N Arın	7	11
2	(Japan) A Yamaguchi	21	21

Third round
9	(China) Han Y	21	19	11
8	(Indonesia) G M Tunjung	13	21	21
13	(Thailand) B Ongbamrungphan
2	(Japan) A Yamaguchi	w	/	o

Quarter-finals
8	(Indonesia) G M Tunjung	16	18
2	(Japan) A Yamaguchi	21	21

== Qualifiers' performances ==
The table below lists out all the qualifiers of this edition by 22 July 2023.

Qualifier	Date of birth	Appearance	Best Performance(s)		Note
Qualifier	Date of birth	Appearance	Edition(s)	Result	Note
Champion
(South Korea) An Se-young	5 February 2002 (aged 21)	3rd	22	B	PB
Finalist
(Spain) Carolina Marín	15 June 1993 (aged 30)	8th	14, 15, 18	G	Reigning European champion
Semi-finalist
(China) Chen Yufei	1 March 1998 (aged 25)	5th	22	S	Reigning Olympics champion
(Japan) Akane Yamaguchi	2 June 1997 (aged 26)	6th	21, 22	G	Reigning world champion
Quarter-finalist
(China) Wang Zhiyi	29 April 2000 (aged 23)	3rd	21, 22	3R	PB
(Chinese Taipei) Tai Tzu-ying	20 June 1994 (aged 29)	8th	21	S	Reigning Asian champion
(Indonesia) Gregoria Mariska Tunjung	11 August 1999 (aged 24)	4th	19	3R	PB
(Japan) Nozomi Okuhara	13 March 1995 (aged 28)	5th	17	G	
Third rounder
(China) Han Yue	18 November 1999 (aged 23)	4th	21, 22	QF	
(China) He Bingjiao	21 March 1997 (aged 26)	6th	18, 21	B	
(Denmark) Mia Blichfeldt	19 August 1997 (aged 26)	6th	19	QF	
(Myanmar) Thet Htar Thuzar	15 March 1999 (aged 24)	3rd	21, 22	1R	PB
(Thailand) Pornpawee Chochuwong	22 January 1998 (aged 25)	4th	21, 22	3R	=PB
(Thailand) Ratchanok Intanon	5 February 1995 (aged 28)	10th	13	G	Youngest winner record holder, and most participated qualifier
(Thailand) Busanan Ongbamrungphan	22 March 1996 (aged 27)	7th	22	QF	
(United States) Beiwen Zhang	12 July 1990 (aged 33)	4th	18, 19, 22	3R	Oldest participated qualifier, =PB
Second rounder
(Brazil) Juliana Viana Vieira	23 September 2004 (aged 18)	Debut			Youngest qualifier, PB
(Canada) Michelle Li	3 November 1991 (aged 31)	10th	22	QF	Reigning Pan America champion, and most participated qualifier
(Chinese Taipei) Hsu Wen-chi	28 September 1997 (aged 25)	Debut			PB
(Chinese Taipei) Pai Yu-po	18 April 1991 (aged 32)	7th	15	3R	
(Denmark) Line Christophersen	14 January 2000 (aged 23)	3rd	21	3R	
(Denmark) Line Kjærsfeldt	20 April 1994 (aged 29)	9th	14, 15, 17, 19, 21	2R	=PB
(Germany) Yvonne Li	30 May 1998 (aged 25)	4th	21, 22	2R	=PB
(India) P. V. Sindhu	5 July 1995 (aged 28)	8th	19	G	
(Indonesia) Putri Kusuma Wardani	20 July 2002 (aged 21)	2nd	22	1R	PB
(Malaysia) Goh Jin Wei	30 January 2000 (aged 23)	2nd	18	3R	
(Republic of Ireland) Rachael Darragh	24 September 1997 (aged 25)	Debut			PB
(Scotland) Kirsty Gilmour	21 September 1993 (aged 29)	9th	17	QF	
(Singapore) Yeo Jia Min	1 February 1999 (aged 24)	3rd	19	QF	
(South Korea) Kim Ga-eun	7 February 1998 (aged 25)	4th	19, 21	3R	
(Turkey) Neslihan Arın	26 February 1994 (aged 29)	5th	21	2R	=PB
(United States) Iris Wang	2 September 1994 (aged 28)	5th	15, 21, 22	2R	=PB
First rounder
(Australia) Tiffany Ho	6 January 1998 (aged 25)	Debut			PB
(Belgium) Lianne Tan	20 November 1990 (aged 32)	7th	09, 10, 11, 19, 21	2R	
(Canada) Wenyu Zhang	29 August 2002 (aged 20)	2nd	22	2R	
(Egypt) Doha Hany	10 September 1997 (aged 25)	2nd	22	1R	=PB
(Estonia) Kristin Kuuba	15 February 1997 (aged 26)	4th	19, 21, 22	1R	=PB
(France) Léonice Huet	21 May 2000 (aged 23)	2nd	22	2R	
(Hungary) Vivien Sándorházi	3 January 2001 (aged 22)	Debut			PB
(Malaysia) Kisona Selvaduray	1 October 1998 (aged 24)	2nd	22	1R	=PB
(Mexico) Haramara Gaitán	7 August 1996 (aged 27)	Debut			PB
(Peru) Inés Castillo	7 December 1999 (aged 23)	Debut			PB
(Singapore) Khan Insyirah	12 September 2001 (aged 21)	Debut			PB
(Spain) Clara Azurmendi	4 May 1998 (aged 25)	2nd	21	1R	=PB
(Switzerland) Jenjira Stadelmann	20 November 1999 (aged 23)	Debut			PB
(Ukraine) Polina Buhrova	30 January 2004 (aged 19)	Debut			PB
(Vietnam) Nguyễn Thùy Linh	20 November 1997 (aged 25)	5th	18	3R	
Withdrew
(France) Qi Xuefei	28 February 1992 (aged 31)	–	21, 22	1R	
