= 2026 All England Open =

Badminton tournament in England

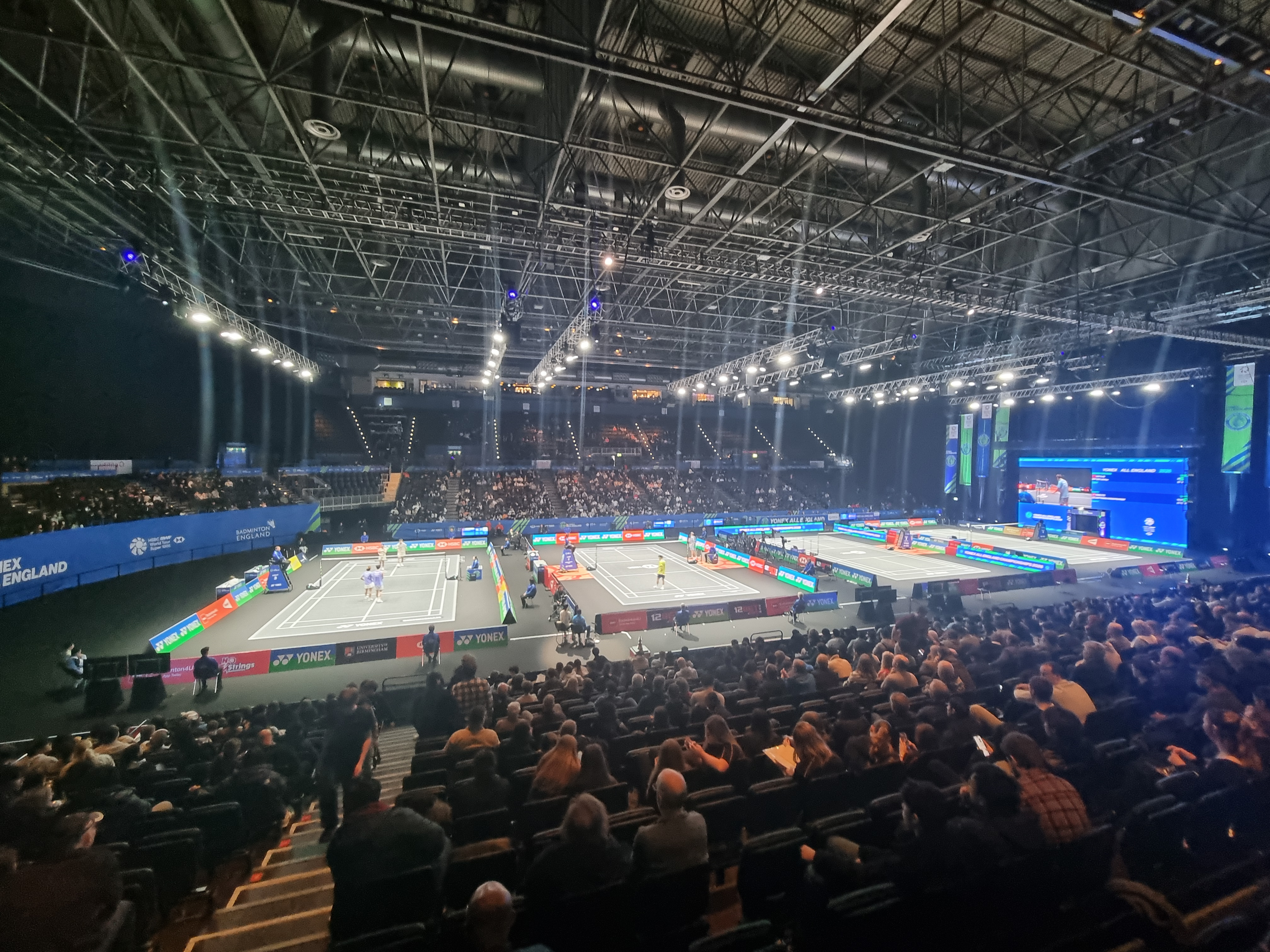

Tournament details
- Dates: 3–8 March
- Edition: 116th
- Level: Super 1000
- Total prize money: US$1,450,000
- Venue: Utilita Arena Birmingham
- Location: Birmingham, England

Champions
- Men's singles: (Chinese Taipei) Lin Chun-yi
- Women's singles: (China) Wang Zhiyi
- Men's doubles: (South Korea) Kim Won-ho (South Korea) Seo Seung-jae
- Women's doubles: (China) Liu Shengshu (China) Tan Ning
- Mixed doubles: (Chinese Taipei) Ye Hong-wei (Chinese Taipei) Nicole Gonzales Chan

The 2026 All England Open, officially known as the Yonex All England Open Badminton Championships 2026 for sponsorship reasons, was a badminton tournament that took place at the Utilita Arena Birmingham, Birmingham, England, from 3 to 8 March and had a total prize of US$1,450,000.

== Tournament ==
The 2026 All England Open is the sixth tournament of the 2026 BWF World Tour and is part of the All England Open championships, which have been held since 1899. This tournament is organized by the Badminton England with sanction from the BWF.

=== Venue ===
This tournament has been held at the Utilita Arena Birmingham in Birmingham, England.

=== Point distribution ===
Below is the point distribution table for each phase of the tournament based on the BWF points system for the BWF World Tour Super 1000 event.

Winner	Runner-up	3/4	5/8	9/16	17/32
12,000	10,200	8,400	6,600	4,800	3,000

=== Prize pool ===
The total prize money is US$1,450,000 with the distribution of the prize money in accordance with BWF regulations.

Event	Winner	Finalist	Semi-finals	Quarter-finals	Last 16	Last 32
Singles	$101,500	$49,300	$20,300	$7,975	$4,350	$1,450
Doubles	$107,300	$50,750	$20,300	$9,062.50	$4,712.50	$1,450

== Men's singles ==
=== Seeds ===
1. (China) Shi Yuqi (first round)
2. (Thailand) Kunlavut Vitidsarn (semi-finals)
3. (Denmark) Anders Antonsen (first round)
4. (Indonesia) Jonatan Christie (second round)
5. (France) Christo Popov (quarter-finals)
6. (China) Li Shifeng (quarter-finals)
7. (Chinese Taipei) Chou Tien-chen (second round)
8. (France) Alex Lanier (first round)

=== Finals ===
Semi-finals
(India) Lakshya Sen	21	18	21
(Canada) Victor Lai	16	21	15
(Chinese Taipei) Lin Chun-yi	21	18	21
2	(Thailand) Kunlavut Vitidsarn	14	21	16

Final
(India) Lakshya Sen	15	20
(Chinese Taipei) Lin Chun-yi	21	22

=== Top half ===
==== Section 1 ====
First round
1	(China) Shi YQ	21	21	17
(India) L Sen	23	19	21
(Hong Kong) Ng K L	21	21
(Canada) B Yang	14	9
6	(China) Li SF	21	21
(China) Wang ZX	12	16
(Republic of Ireland) N Nguyen	21	21
(Chinese Taipei) Lee C-h	17	8

Second round
(India) L Sen	21	21	21
(Hong Kong) Ng K L	19	23	10
6	(China) Li SF	17	21	21
(Republic of Ireland) N Nguyen	21	12	11

Quarter-finals
(India) L Sen	21	21
6	(China) Li SF	13	16

==== Section 2 ====
First round
3	(Denmark) A Antonsen	8	12
(Japan) K Watanabe	21	21
(Malaysia) Leong J H	21	13	21
(Japan) K Nishimoto	17	21	18
8	(France) A Lanier	12	23	21
(Canada) V Lai	21	21	23
(Hong Kong) Lee C Y	21	21
(China) Weng HY	19	17

Second round
(Japan) K Watanabe	21	21
(Malaysia) Leong J H	9	13
(Canada) V Lai	21	21
(Hong Kong) Lee C Y	12	18

Quarter-finals
(Japan) K Watanabe	21	17	15
(Canada) V Lai	18	21	21

=== Bottom half ===
==== Section 3 ====
First round
(Singapore) Loh K Y	14	21	24
(Japan) K Naraoka	21	19	22
(Denmark) R Gemke	14	16
5	(France) C Popov	21	21
(Chinese Taipei) Wang T-w	16	17
(Chinese Taipei) Lin C-y	21	21
(Singapore) J Teh	11	21	15
4	(Indonesia) J Christie	21	10	21

Second round
(Singapore) Loh K Y	12	17
5	(France) C Popov	21	21
(Chinese Taipei) Lin C-y	21	21
4	(Indonesia) J Christie	19	12

Quarter-finals
5	(France) C Popov	18	14
(Chinese Taipei) Lin C-y	21	21

==== Section 4 ====
First round
(India) A Shetty	21	9	17
(Indonesia) A Farhan	19	21	21
(Chinese Taipei) Chi Y-j	21	14	3^{r}
7	(Chinese Taipei) Chou T-c	17	21	11
(Japan) Y Tanaka	19	15
(France) T J Popov	21	21
(China) Lu GZ	15	10
2	(Thailand) K Vitidsarn	21	21

Second round
(Indonesia) A Farhan	21	21
7	(Chinese Taipei) Chou T-c	13	19
(France) T J Popov	21	9	13
2	(Thailand) K Vitidsarn	19	21	21

Quarter-finals
(Indonesia) A Farhan	17	12
2	(Thailand) K Vitidsarn	21	21

== Women's singles ==
=== Seeds ===
1. (South Korea) An Se-young (final)
2. (China) Wang Zhiyi (champion)
3. (China) Chen Yufei (semi-finals)
4. (Japan) Akane Yamaguchi (semi-finals)
5. (China) Han Yue (first round)
6. (Indonesia) Putri Kusuma Wardani (quarter-finals)
7. (Thailand) Ratchanok Intanon (first round)
8. (Thailand) Pornpawee Chochuwong (quarter-finals)

=== Finals ===
Semi-finals
1	(South Korea) An Se-young	20	21	21
3	(China) Chen Yufei	22	9	12
4	(Japan) Akane Yamaguchi	15	19
2	(China) Wang Zhiyi	21	21

Final
1	(South Korea) An Se-young	15	19
2	(China) Wang Zhiyi	21	21

=== Top half ===
==== Section 1 ====
First round
1	(South Korea) An S-y	21	21
(Turkey) N Arın	8	6
(Chinese Taipei) Lin H-t	21	21
(South Korea) Sim Y-j	16	13
6	(Indonesia) P K Wardani	11
(Denmark) M Blichfeldt	1^{r}
PFR	(Chinese Taipei) Huang Y-h	11	10
(South Korea) Kim G-e	21	21

Second round
1	(South Korea) An S-y	21	21
(Chinese Taipei) Lin H-t	15	11
6	(Indonesia) P K Wardani	25	21
(South Korea) Kim G-e	23	15

Quarter-finals
1	(South Korea) An S-y	21	21
6	(Indonesia) P K Wardani	11	14

==== Section 2 ====
First round
3	(China) Chen YF	21	21
(India) M Bansod	11	6
(Japan) N Nidaira	21	21
(Chinese Taipei) Sung S-y	13	15
8	(Thailand) P Chochuwong	21	21
(India) U Hooda	12	18
(Canada) M Li	21	23
(China) Gao FJ	10	21

Second round
3	(China) Chen YF	21	21
(Japan) N Nidaira	9	16
8	(Thailand) P Chochuwong	21	24
(Canada) M Li	16	22

Quarter-finals
3	(China) Chen YF	23	21
8	(Thailand) P Chochuwong	21	11

=== Bottom half ===
==== Section 3 ====
First round
(Vietnam) Nguyễn T L	15	11
(Denmark) L Christophersen	21	21
(Singapore) Yeo J M	12	11
7	(Thailand) R Intanon	21	6^{r}
(United States) BW Zhang	21	8	12
(Chinese Taipei) Chiu P-c	18	21	21
(Thailand) B Ongbamrungphan	13	11
4	(Japan) A Yamaguchi	21	21

Second round
(Denmark) L Christophersen	21	21
(Singapore) Yeo J M	18	11
(Chinese Taipei) Chiu P-c	19	17
4	(Japan) A Yamaguchi	21	21

Quarter-finals
(Denmark) L Christophersen	21	17	10
4	(Japan) A Yamaguchi	13	21	21

==== Section 4 ====
First round
(Japan) N Okuhara	21	15	14
(Japan) T Miyazaki	15	21	21
(Japan) R Gunji	20	21	21
5	(China) Han Y	22	17	18
(Thailand) S Katethong	21	21
PFR	(Chinese Taipei) Hsu W-c	12	14
(Japan) H Akechi	15	15
2	(China) Wang ZY	21	21

Second round
(Japan) T Miyazaki	18	21	24
(Japan) R Gunji	21	15	22
(Thailand) S Katethong	19	18
2	(China) Wang ZY	21	21

Quarter-finals
(Japan) T Miyazaki	13	21	16
2	(China) Wang ZY	21	8	21

== Men's doubles ==
=== Seeds ===
1. (South Korea) Kim Won-ho / Seo Seung-jae (champions)
2. (Malaysia) Aaron Chia / Soh Wooi Yik (final)
3. (China) Liang Weikeng / Wang Chang (quarter-finals)
4. (India) Satwiksairaj Rankireddy / Chirag Shetty (first round)
5. (Indonesia) Fajar Alfian / Muhammad Shohibul Fikri (second round)
6. (Malaysia) Man Wei Chong / Tee Kai Wun (quarter-finals)
7. (Indonesia) Sabar Karyaman Gutama / Muhammad Reza Pahlevi Isfahani (first round)
8. (Malaysia) Goh Sze Fei / Nur Izzuddin (second round)

=== Finals ===
Semi-finals
1	(South Korea) Kim Won-ho (South Korea) Seo Seung-jae	21	21
(Indonesia) Raymond Indra (Indonesia) Nikolaus Joaquin	19	13
(China) Chen Boyang (China) Liu Yi	11	19
2	(Malaysia) Aaron Chia (Malaysia) Soh Wooi Yik	21	21

Final
1	(South Korea) Kim Won-ho (South Korea) Seo Seung-jae	18	21	21
2	(Malaysia) Aaron Chia (Malaysia) Soh Wooi Yik	21	12	19

=== Top half ===
==== Section 1 ====
First round
1	(South Korea) Kim W-h (South Korea) Seo S-j	21	18
(England) B Lane (England) S Vendy	16	15^{r}
(Malaysia) Choong H J (Malaysia) M Haikal	13	17
(Denmark) K Astrup (Denmark) A S Rasmussen	21	21
7	(Indonesia) S K Gutama (Indonesia) M R Isfahani	12	12
(France) C Popov (France) T J Popov	21	21
(Japan) T Hoki (Japan) Y Kobayashi	21	21
(Chinese Taipei) Chen Z-r (Chinese Taipei) Lin Y-c	12	14

Second round
1	(South Korea) Kim W-h (South Korea) Seo S-j	21	21
(Denmark) K Astrup (Denmark) A S Rasmussen	14	16
(France) C Popov (France) T J Popov	21	15	21
(Japan) T Hoki (Japan) Y Kobayashi	10	21	19

Quarter-finals
1	(South Korea) Kim W-h (South Korea) Seo S-j	16	21	21
(France) C Popov (France) T J Popov	21	7	14

==== Section 2 ====
First round
3	(China) Liang WK (China) Wang C	21	21
(Japan) T Nomura (Japan) Y Shimogami	16	19
(Indonesia) L R Carnando (Indonesia) B Maulana	13	19
(Chinese Taipei) Lee J-h (Chinese Taipei) Yang P-hs	21	21
5	(Indonesia) F Alfian (Indonesia) M S Fikri	21	21
(Malaysia) Ong Y S (Malaysia) Teo E Y	9	17
(South Korea) Kang M-h (South Korea) Ki D-j	21	12	19
(Indonesia) R Indra (Indonesia) N Joaquin	17	21	21

Second round
3	(China) Liang WK (China) Wang C	21	14	21
(Chinese Taipei) Lee J-h (Chinese Taipei) Yang P-hs	17	21	11
5	(Indonesia) F Alfian (Indonesia) M S Fikri	21	14	16
(Indonesia) R Indra (Indonesia) N Joaquin	8	21	21

Quarter-finals
3	(China) Liang WK (China) Wang C	18	12
(Indonesia) R Indra (Indonesia) N Joaquin	21	21

=== Bottom half ===
==== Section 3 ====
First round
(Indonesia) M R Ardianto (Indonesia) R Hidayat	21	21
(Chinese Taipei) Liu K-h (Chinese Taipei) Yang P-ha	10	16
(Japan) K Kumagai (Japan) H Nishi	10	15
8	(Malaysia) Goh S F (Malaysia) N Izzuddin	21	21
(China) Chen BY (China) Liu Y	21	21
(Chinese Taipei) He Z-w (Chinese Taipei) Huang J-h	12	12
(Malaysia) Kang K X (Malaysia) A Tai	23	21
4	(India) S Rankireddy (India) C Shetty	21	12

Second round
(Indonesia) M R Ardianto (Indonesia) R Hidayat	23	21
8	(Malaysia) Goh S F (Malaysia) N Izzuddin	21	16
(China) Chen BY (China) Liu Y	21	21
(Malaysia) Kang K X (Malaysia) A Tai	19	17

Quarter-finals
(Indonesia) M R Ardianto (Indonesia) R Hidayat	16	10
(China) Chen BY (China) Liu Y	21	21

==== Section 4 ====
First round
(Malaysia) N M Azriyn A (Malaysia) Tan W K	18	14
(Chinese Taipei) Chiu H-c (Chinese Taipei) Wang C-l	21	21
(Chinese Taipei) Lee F-c (Chinese Taipei) Lee F-j	17	16
6	(Malaysia) Man W C (Malaysia) Tee K W	21	21
(Denmark) D Lundgaard (Denmark) M Vestergaard	19	21	18
(Malaysia) J Arif (Malaysia) Yap R K	21	18	21
(United States) Chen Z-y (United States) P Smith	17	17
2	(Malaysia) A Chia (Malaysia) Soh W Y	21	21

Second round
(Chinese Taipei) Chiu H-c (Chinese Taipei) Wang C-l	14	18
6	(Malaysia) Man W C (Malaysia) Tee K W	21	21
(Malaysia) J Arif (Malaysia) Yap R K	15	21	18
2	(Malaysia) A Chia (Malaysia) Soh W Y	21	18	21

Quarter-finals
6	(Malaysia) Man W C (Malaysia) Tee K W	16	22	14
2	(Malaysia) A Chia (Malaysia) Soh W Y	21	20	21

== Women's doubles ==
=== Seeds ===
1. (China) Liu Shengshu / Tan Ning (champions)
2. (Malaysia) Pearly Tan / Thinaah Muralitharan (semi-finals)
3. (China) Jia Yifan / Zhang Shuxian (semi-finals)
4. (South Korea) Baek Ha-na / Lee So-hee (final)
5. (Japan) Yuki Fukushima / Mayu Matsumoto (quarter-finals)
6. (Japan) Rin Iwanaga / Kie Nakanishi (second round)
7. (China) Li Yijing / Luo Xumin (first round)
8. (Chinese Taipei) Hsieh Pei-shan / Hung En-tzu (quarter-finals)

=== Finals ===
Semi-finals
1	(China) Liu Shengshu (China) Tan Ning	18	21	22
3	(China) Jia Yifan (China) Zhang Shuxian	21	17	20
4	(South Korea) Baek Ha-na (South Korea) Lee So-hee	21	21
2	(Malaysia) Pearly Tan (Malaysia) Thinaah Muralitharan	17	18

Final
1	(China) Liu Shengshu (China) Tan Ning	21	21
4	(South Korea) Baek Ha-na (South Korea) Lee So-hee	18	12

=== Top half ===
==== Section 1 ====
First round
1	(China) Liu SS (China) Tan N	21	21
(Chinese Taipei) Hu L-f (Chinese Taipei) Jheng Y-c	17	11
(Chinese Taipei) Chang C-h (Chinese Taipei) Yang C-t	21	18	18
(United States) F Corbett (United States) J Gai	17	21	21
8	(Chinese Taipei) Hsieh P-s (Chinese Taipei) Hung E-t	19	21	21
(Turkey) B Erçetin (Turkey) N İnci	21	16	18
(Japan) R Hirokami (Japan) S Hobara	19	21	21
(Chinese Taipei) Hsu Y-h (Chinese Taipei) Lin J-y	21	8	7

Second round
1	(China) Liu SS (China) Tan N	21	21
(United States) F Corbett (United States) J Gai	13	16
8	(Chinese Taipei) Hsieh P-s (Chinese Taipei) Hung E-t	21	21
(Japan) R Hirokami (Japan) S Hobara	19	12

Quarter-finals
1	(China) Liu SS (China) Tan N	21	21
8	(Chinese Taipei) Hsieh P-s (Chinese Taipei) Hung E-t	11	16

==== Section 2 ====
First round
3	(China) Jia YF (China) Zhang SX	21	21
(Indonesia) R A Rose (Indonesia) F Setianingrum	16	17
(Hong Kong) Lui L L (Hong Kong) Tsang H Y	18	9
(Japan) K Osawa (Japan) M Tanabe	21	21
7	(China) Li YJ (China) Luo XM	15	17
(Bulgaria) G Stoeva (Bulgaria) S Stoeva	21	21
(Japan) S Hirota (Japan) A Sakuramoto	21	15	21
(India) T Jolly (India) G Gopichand	15	21	18

Second round
3	(China) Jia YF (China) Zhang SX	21	22
(Japan) K Osawa (Japan) M Tanabe	7	20
(Bulgaria) G Stoeva (Bulgaria) S Stoeva	6	17
(Japan) S Hirota (Japan) A Sakuramoto	21	21

Quarter-finals
3	(China) Jia YF (China) Zhang SX	21	22
(Japan) S Hirota (Japan) A Sakuramoto	17	20

=== Bottom half ===
==== Section 3 ====
First round
(Indonesia) A C Pratiwi (Indonesia) S F Ramadhanti	21	22
(Chinese Taipei) Hsu Y-c (Chinese Taipei) Sung Y-h	16	20
(Malaysia) Ong X Y (Malaysia) C Ting	17	8
5	(Japan) Y Fukushima (Japan) M Matsumoto	21	21
(Hong Kong) Yeung N T (Hong Kong) Yeung P L	17	16
(France) M Lambert (France) C Pognante	21	21
(Japan) R Hiramoto (Japan) K Ishikawa	10	10
4	(South Korea) Baek H-n (South Korea) Lee S-h	21	21

Second round
(Indonesia) A C Pratiwi (Indonesia) S F Ramadhanti	15	16
5	(Japan) Y Fukushima (Japan) M Matsumoto	21	21
(France) M Lambert (France) C Pognante	8	7
4	(South Korea) Baek H-n (South Korea) Lee S-h	21	21

Quarter-finals
5	(Japan) Y Fukushima (Japan) M Matsumoto	18	7
4	(South Korea) Baek H-n (South Korea) Lee S-h	21	21

==== Section 4 ====
First round
(Indonesia) F D Kusuma (Indonesia) M T Puspita Sari	19	21	21
(Ukraine) P Buhrova (Ukraine) Y Kantemyr	21	15	19
(Chinese Taipei) Lin X-m (Chinese Taipei) Wang Y-q	23	7	13
6	(Japan) R Iwanaga (Japan) K Nakanishi	21	21	21
(South Korea) Lee S-j (South Korea) Lee Y-w	21	15	21
(United States) L Lam (United States) A Lee	19	21	17
(Japan) A Igarashi (Japan) C Shida	19	13
2	(Malaysia) P Tan (Malaysia) Thinaah M	21	21

Second round
(Indonesia) F D Kusuma (Indonesia) M T Puspita Sari	21	18	21
6	(Japan) R Iwanaga (Japan) K Nakanishi	11	21	17
(South Korea) Lee S-j (South Korea) Lee Y-w	14	14
2	(Malaysia) P Tan (Malaysia) Thinaah M	21	21

Quarter-finals
(Indonesia) F D Kusuma (Indonesia) M T Puspita Sari	9	18
2	(Malaysia) P Tan (Malaysia) Thinaah M	21	21

== Mixed doubles ==
=== Seeds ===
1. (China) Feng Yanzhe / Huang Dongping (second round)
2. (China) Jiang Zhenbang / Wei Yaxin (quarter-finals)
3. (Thailand) Dechapol Puavaranukroh / Supissara Paewsampran (withdrew)
4. (Malaysia) Chen Tang Jie / Toh Ee Wei (first round)
5. (France) Thom Gicquel / Delphine Delrue (final)
6. (China) Guo Xinwa / Chen Fanghui (semi-finals)
7. (Hong Kong) Tang Chun Man / Tse Ying Suet (semi-finals)
8. (Denmark) Mathias Christiansen / Alexandra Bøje (first round)

=== Finals ===
Semi-finals
7	(Hong Kong) Tang Chun Man (Hong Kong) Tse Ying Suet	21	15	13
(Chinese Taipei) Ye Hong-wei (Chinese Taipei) Nicole Gonzales Chan	16	21	21
6	(China) Guo Xinwa (China) Chen Fanghui	21	18	12
5	(France) Thom Gicquel (France) Delphine Delrue	11	21	21

Final
(Chinese Taipei) Ye Hong-wei (Chinese Taipei) Nicole Gonzales Chan	21	21
5	(France) Thom Gicquel (France) Delphine Delrue	19	18

=== Top half ===
==== Section 1 ====
First round
1	(China) Feng YZ (China) Huang DP	18	21	21
(Singapore) T Hee (Indonesia) G E Widjaja	21	18	19
(China) Cheng X (China) Zhang C	16	21	17
(Denmark) M Vestergaard (Denmark) C Busch	21	15	21
7	(Hong Kong) Tang C M (Hong Kong) Tse Y S	16	21	21
(Thailand) R Oupthong (Thailand) J Sudjaipraparat	21	15	11
(India) D Kapila (India) T Crasto	21	21
(Malaysia) Hoo P R (Malaysia) Cheng S Y	17	19

Second round
1	(China) Feng YZ (China) Huang DP	21	18	17
(Denmark) M Vestergaard (Denmark) C Busch	18	21	21
7	(Hong Kong) Tang C M (Hong Kong) Tse Y S	21	9
(India) D Kapila (India) T Crasto	19	8^{r}

Quarter-finals
(Denmark) M Vestergaard (Denmark) C Busch	18	21	15
7	(Hong Kong) Tang C M (Hong Kong) Tse Y S	21	19	21

==== Section 2 ====
First round
4	(Malaysia) Chen T J (Malaysia) Toh E W	21	12	23
(Denmark) R Espersen (Denmark) A C Kudsk	18	21	25
(Chinese Taipei) Ye H-w (Chinese Taipei) N G Chan	21	21
(Malaysia) J Wong (Malaysia) Lai P J	17	18
8	(Denmark) M Christiansen (Denmark) A Bøje	16	18
(Chinese Taipei) Yang P-hs (Chinese Taipei) Hu L-f	21	21
(Thailand) P Teeraratsakul (Thailand) S Taerattanachai	21	21
PFR	(Chinese Taipei) Wu G-x (Chinese Taipei) Lee C-h	18	12

Second round
(Denmark) R Espersen (Denmark) A C Kudsk	14	16
(Chinese Taipei) Ye H-w (Chinese Taipei) N G Chan	21	21
(Chinese Taipei) Yang P-hs (Chinese Taipei) Hu L-f	15	21	15
(Thailand) P Teeraratsakul (Thailand) S Taerattanachai	21	13	21

Quarter-finals
(Chinese Taipei) Ye H-w (Chinese Taipei) N G Chan	21	21
(Thailand) P Teeraratsakul (Thailand) S Taerattanachai	15	12

=== Bottom half ===
==== Section 3 ====
First round
(Indonesia) A Syahnawi (Indonesia) N V Marwah	21	21
(Germany) M Seidel (Germany) T P Nguyen	17	14
(China) Gao JX (China) Wu MY	22	13
SWM	(Indonesia) J Hidayatullah (Indonesia) F Pasaribu	24	21
(Denmark) J Toft (Denmark) A Magelund	19	21	9
(Scotland) A Dunn (Scotland) J MacPherson	21	14	21
(Malaysia) Wong T C (Malaysia) Lim C S	21	12	9
6	(China) Guo XW (China) Chen FH	17	21	21

Second round
(Indonesia) A Syahnawi (Indonesia) N V Marwah	22	21
SWM	(Indonesia) J Hidayatullah (Indonesia) F Pasaribu	20	18
(Scotland) A Dunn (Scotland) J MacPherson	19	19
6	(China) Guo XW (China) Chen FH	21	21

Quarter-finals
(Indonesia) A Syahnawi (Indonesia) N V Marwah	17	21	15
6	(China) Guo XW (China) Chen FH	21	18	21

==== Section 4 ====
First round
(Japan) Y Shimogami (Japan) S Hobara	21	19	21
(Chinese Taipei) Chen C-k (Chinese Taipei) Hsu Y-h	14	21	18
(India) R Kapoor (India) R Gadde	12	15
5	(France) T Gicquel (France) D Delrue	21	21
(Malaysia) Goh S H (Malaysia) S J Lai	21	21
WC	(England) C Hemming (England) E van Leeuwen	14	12
(United States) P Smith (United States) J Gai	10	21	12
2	(China) Jiang ZB (China) Wei YX	21	16	21

Second round
(Japan) Y Shimogami (Japan) S Hobara	18	11
5	(France) T Gicquel (France) D Delrue	21	21
(Malaysia) Goh S H (Malaysia) S J Lai	16	18
2	(China) Jiang ZB (China) Wei YX	21	21

Quarter-finals
5	(France) T Gicquel (France) D Delrue	21	21
2	(China) Jiang ZB (China) Wei YX	16	16

Preceded by 2026 German Open	BWF World Tour; 2026 BWF season	Succeeded by 2026 Swiss Open; 2026 Ruichang China Masters
