= 2023 Hong Kong Open (badminton) =

2023 badminton tournament

Tournament details
- Dates: 12–17 September
- Edition: 33th
- Level: Super 500
- Total prize money: US$420,000
- Venue: Hong Kong Coliseum
- Location: Kowloon, Hong Kong

Champions
- Men's singles: (Indonesia) Jonatan Christie
- Women's singles: (Japan) Akane Yamaguchi
- Men's doubles: (Denmark) Kim Astrup (Denmark) Anders Skaarup Rasmussen
- Women's doubles: (Indonesia) Apriyani Rahayu (Indonesia) Siti Fadia Silva Ramadhanti
- Mixed doubles: (China) Guo Xinwa (China) Wei Yaxin

The 2023 Hong Kong Open, officially the Victor Hong Kong Open 2023, was a badminton tournament which took place at the Hong Kong Coliseum in Hong Kong from 12 to 17 September 2023 and had a total prize of $420,000.

== Tournament ==
The 2023 Hong Kong Open was the twenty-second tournament of the 2023 BWF World Tour and also part of the Hong Kong Open championships, which have been held since 1982. This tournament was organized by Hong Kong Badminton Association and sanctioned by the BWF.

=== Venue ===
This international tournament was held at the Hong Kong Coliseum in Hong Kong.

=== Point distribution ===
Below is a table with the point distribution for each phase of the tournament based on the BWF points system for the BWF World Tour Super 500 event.

| Winner | Runner-up | 3/4 | 5/8 | 9/16 | 17/32 | 33/64 | 65/128 |
|---|---|---|---|---|---|---|---|
| 9,200 | 7,800 | 6,420 | 5,040 | 3,600 | 2,220 | 880 | 430 |

=== Prize money ===
The total prize money for this tournament is US$420,000. Distribution of prize money is in accordance with BWF regulations.

| Event | Winner | Finals | Semi-finals | Quarter-finals | Last 16 |
| Singles | $31,500 | $15,960 | $6,090 | $2,520 | $1,470 |
| Doubles | $33,180 | $15,960 | $5,880 | $3,045 | $1,575 |

== Men's singles ==
=== Seeds ===
1. (Denmark) Viktor Axelsen (First round)
2. (Indonesia) Anthony Sinisuka Ginting (Semi-finals)
3. (Thailand) Kunlavut Vitidsarn (Withdrew)
4. (Japan) Kodai Naraoka (Withdrew)
5. (Indonesia) Jonatan Christie (Champion)
6. (Singapore) Loh Kean Yew (First round)
7. (Chinese Taipei) Chou Tien-chen (First round)
8. (India) Lakshya Sen (Withdrew)

=== Finals ===
Semi-finals
5 | (Indonesia) Jonatan Christie | 21 | 21 | 21
(Malaysia) Ng Tze Yong | 19 | 23 | 13
(Japan) Kenta Nishimoto | 21 | 21
2 | (Indonesia) Anthony Sinisuka Ginting | 13 | 15

Final
5 | (Indonesia) Jonatan Christie | 12 | 22 | 21
(Japan) Kenta Nishimoto | 21 | 20 | 18

=== Top half ===
==== Section 1 ====
First round
1 | (Denmark) V Axelsen | 16 | 10
PFQ | (Chinese Taipei) Lee C-h | 21 | 21
(China) Zhao JP | 17 | 16
(Malaysia) Lee Z J | 21 | 21
5 | (Indonesia) J Christie | 16 | 21 | 21
(Hong Kong) Ng K L | 21 | 17 | 17
(China) Weng HY | 13 | 15
(Hong Kong) Lee C Y | 21 | 21

Second round
PFQ | (Chinese Taipei) Lee C-h | 19 | 21 | 22
(Malaysia) Lee Z J | 21 | 17 | 20
5 | (Indonesia) J Christie | 21 | 21
(Hong Kong) Lee C Y | 18 | 16

Quarter-finals
PFQ | (Chinese Taipei) Lee C-h | 19 | 18
5 | (Indonesia) J Christie | 21 | 21

==== Section 2 ====
First round
PFQ | (Thailand) K Wangcharoen | 11 | 14
(Denmark) M Johannesen | 21 | 21
(Indonesia) C A Dwi Wardoyo | 15 | 15
(Chinese Taipei) Wang T-w | 21 | 21
7 | (Chinese Taipei) Chou T-c | 15 | 19
(Malaysia) Ng T Y | 21 | 21
(Japan) K Tsuneyama | 21 | 21
(India) P Rajawat | 13 | 14

Second round
(Denmark) M Johannesen | 10 | 21 | 22
(Chinese Taipei) Wang T-w | 21 | 19 | 20
(Malaysia) Ng T Y | 21 | 21
(Japan) K Tsuneyama | 12 | 11

Quarter-finals
(Denmark) M Johannesen | 18 | 12
(Malaysia) Ng T Y | 21 | 21

=== Bottom half ===
==== Section 3 ====
First round
(Japan) K Nishimoto | 21 | 21
(China) Lu GZ | 12 | 15
(France) C Popov | 12 | 21 | 21
6 | (Singapore) Loh K Y | 21 | 17 | 13
(Denmark) R Gemke | 21 | 23
Q1 | (Finland) K Koljonen | 11 | 21
Q4 | (Hong Kong) J Gunawan | 21 | 27
PFQ | (Israel) M Zilberman | 15 | 25

Second round
(Japan) K Nishimoto | 13 | 21 | 21
(France) C Popov | 21 | 14 | 13
(Denmark) R Gemke | 21 | 15 | 21
Q4 | (Hong Kong) J Gunawan | 7 | 21 | 13

Quarter-finals
(Japan) K Nishimoto | 21 | 2
(Denmark) R Gemke | 16 | 8^{r}

==== Section 4 ====
First round
(Denmark) A Antonsen | 26 | 21
(France) T J Popov | 24 | 17
Q3 | (Chinese Taipei) Su L-y | w | / | o
8 | (India) L Sen
(Chinese Taipei) Lin C-y | 20 | 15
Q2 | (Malaysia) Leong J H | 22 | 21
(Canada) B Yang | 9 | 14
2 | (Indonesia) A S Ginting | 21 | 21

Second round
(Denmark) A Antonsen
Q3 | (Chinese Taipei) Su L-y | w | / | o
Q2 | (Malaysia) Leong J H | 14 | 11
2 | (Indonesia) A S Ginting | 21 | 21

Quarter-finals
Q3 | (Chinese Taipei) Su L-y | 12 | 16
2 | (Indonesia) A S Ginting | 21 | 21

== Women's singles ==
=== Seeds ===
1. (Japan) Akane Yamaguchi (Champion)
2. (Chinese Taipei) Tai Tzu-ying (First round)
3. (Spain) Carolina Marín (Quarter-finals)
4. (Thailand) Ratchanok Intanon (Second round)
5. (Indonesia) Gregoria Mariska Tunjung (Semi-finals)
6. (China) Han Yue (Quarter-finals)
7. (United States) Beiwen Zhang (Quarter-finals)
8. (China) Wang Zhiyi (Quarter-finals)

=== Finals ===
Semi-finals
1 | (Japan) Akane Yamaguchi | 21 | 23 | 21
5 | (Indonesia) Gregoria Mariska Tunjung | 17 | 25 | 18
(Malaysia) Goh Jin Wei | 14 | 11
(China) Zhang Yiman | 21 | 21

Final
1 | (Japan) Akane Yamaguchi | 21 | 21
(China) Zhang Yiman | 18 | 15

=== Top half ===
==== Section 1 ====
First round
1 | (Japan) A Yamaguchi | 21 | 21
(China) Gao FJ | 15 | 14
(Scotland) K Gilmour | 21 | 21
(Chinese Taipei) Pai Y-p | 14 | 8
7 | (United States) BW Zhang | 21 | 21
(Chinese Taipei) Sung S-y | 13 | 13
(Japan) N Nidaira | 14 | 19
(Japan) A Ohori | 21 | 21

Second round
1 | (Japan) A Yamaguchi | 7 | 21 | 26
(Scotland) K Gilmour | 21 | 16 | 24
7 | (United States) BW Zhang | 21 | 14 | 23
(Japan) A Ohori | 17 | 21 | 21

Quarter-finals
1 | (Japan) A Yamaguchi | 21 | 21
7 | (United States) BW Zhang | 13 | 15

==== Section 2 ====
First round
3 | (Spain) C Marín | 21 | 14 | 21
Q1 | (Chinese Taipei) Lin H-t | 9 | 21 | 14
(Germany) Y Li | 21 | 21
PFQ | (India) A Kashyap | 18 | 10
5 | (Indonesia) G M Tunjung | 21 | 18 | 21
(Thailand) B Ongbamrungphan | 17 | 21 | 17
(Singapore) Yeo J M | 21 | 21
Q4 | (Malaysia) Kisona S | 11 | 12

Second round
3 | (Spain) C Marín | 18 | 21 | 21
(Germany) Y Li | 21 | 14 | 11
5 | (Indonesia) G M Tunjung | 21 | 21
(Singapore) Yeo J M | 11 | 18

Quarter-finals
3 | (Spain) C Marín | 9 | 18
5 | (Indonesia) G M Tunjung | 21 | 21

=== Bottom half ===
==== Section 3 ====
First round
PFQ | (Japan) N Okuhara | 7 | 21
(Indonesia) P K Wardani | 21 | 23
(Japan) S Kawakami | 19 | 16
6 | (China) Han Y | 21 | 21
(Denmark) L Kjærsfeldt | 25 | 13 | 14
(Malaysia) Goh J W | 23 | 21 | 21
(Denmark) M Blichfeldt | 18 | 17
4 | (Thailand) R Intanon | 21 | 21

Second round
(Indonesia) P K Wardani | 12 | 21 | 19
6 | (China) Han Y | 21 | 18 | 21
(Malaysia) Goh J W | w | / | o
4 | (Thailand) R Intanon

Quarter-finals
6 | (China) Han Y | 21 | 17 | 18
(Malaysia) Goh J W | 12 | 21 | 21

==== Section 4 ====
First round
Q2 | (Thailand) L Chaiwan | 21 | 15 | 15
(Thailand) P Chochuwong | 17 | 21 | 21
(Thailand) S Katethong | 10 | 10
8 | (China) Wang ZY | 21 | 21
(China) Zhang YM | 21 | 21
Q3 | (India) M Bansod | 14 | 12
(Chinese Taipei) Hsu W-c | 21 | 11
2 | (Chinese Taipei) Tai T-y | 10 | 3^{r}

Second round
(Thailand) P Chochuwong | 18 | 4^{r}
8 | (China) Wang ZY | 21 | 11
(China) Zhang YM | 21 | 21
(Chinese Taipei) Hsu W-c | 14 | 13

Quarter-finals
8 | (China) Wang ZY | 17 | 17
(China) Zhang YM | 21 | 21

== Men's doubles ==
=== Seeds ===
1. (Indonesia) Fajar Alfian / Muhammad Rian Ardianto (Second round)
2. (Malaysia) Aaron Chia / Soh Wooi Yik (Withdrew)
3. (Japan) Takuro Hoki / Yugo Kobayashi (Withdrew)
4. (Malaysia) Ong Yew Sin / Teo Ee Yi (First round)
5. (Indonesia) Mohammad Ahsan / Hendra Setiawan (Semi-finals)
6. (Indonesia) Leo Rolly Carnando / Daniel Marthin (Final)
7. (Denmark) Kim Astrup / Anders Skaarup Rasmussen (Champions)
8. (Chinese Taipei) Lee Yang / Wang Chi-lin (Semi-finals)

=== Finals ===
Semi-finals
7 | (Denmark) Kim Astrup (Denmark) Anders Skaarup Rasmussen | 24 | 19 | 21
5 | (Indonesia) Mohammad Ahsan (Indonesia) Hendra Setiawan | 22 | 21 | 11
6 | (Indonesia) Leo Rolly Carnando (Indonesia) Daniel Marthin | 13 | 21 | 21
8 | (Chinese Taipei) Lee Yang (Chinese Taipei) Wang Chi-lin | 21 | 8 | 13

Final
7 | (Denmark) Kim Astrup (Denmark) Anders Skaarup Rasmussen | 21 | 22 | 21
6 | (Indonesia) Leo Rolly Carnando (Indonesia) Daniel Marthin | 10 | 24 | 19

=== Top half ===
==== Section 1 ====
First round
1 | (Indonesia) F Alfian (Indonesia) M R Ardianto | 21 | 21
(Chinese Taipei) Su C-h (Chinese Taipei) Ye H-w | 14 | 18
PFQ | (Malaysia) Low H Y (Malaysia) Ng E C | 21 | 16 | 12
(Chinese Taipei) Lee F-c (Chinese Taipei) Lee F-j | 18 | 21 | 21
7 | (Denmark) K Astrup (Denmark) A S Rasmussen | 21 | 21
(Denmark) R Kjær (Denmark) F Søgaard | 13 | 19
(Scotland) A Dunn (Scotland) A Hall | 25 | 21
(France) C Popov (France) T J Popov | 23 | 11

Second round
1 | (Indonesia) F Alfian (Indonesia) M R Ardianto | 16 | 19
(Chinese Taipei) Lee F-c (Chinese Taipei) Lee F-j | 21 | 21
7 | (Denmark) K Astrup (Denmark) A S Rasmussen | 21 | 21
(Scotland) A Dunn (Scotland) A Hall | 15 | 12

Quarter-finals
(Chinese Taipei) Lee F-c (Chinese Taipei) Lee F-j | 13 | 17
7 | (Denmark) K Astrup (Denmark) A S Rasmussen | 21 | 21

==== Section 2 ====
First round
4 | (Malaysia) Ong Y S (Malaysia) Teo E Y | 16 | 23
(Japan) K Matsui (Japan) Y Takeuchi | 21 | 25
(Indonesia) P Kusumawardana (Indonesia) Y Rambitan | 21 | 21
(Japan) A Endo (Japan) Y Takei | 11 | 16
5 | (Indonesia) M Ahsan (Indonesia) H Setiawan | 15 | 21 | 21
PFQ | (Malaysia) J Arif (Malaysia) Yap R K | 21 | 16 | 16
PFQ | (Philippines) C Bernardo (Philippines) A Morada | 23 | 18 | 12
(Chinese Taipei) Chiu H-c (Chinese Taipei) Yang M-t | 21 | 21 | 21

Second round
(Japan) K Matsui (Japan) Y Takeuchi | 21 | 21
(Indonesia) P Kusumawardana (Indonesia) Y Rambitan | 19 | 16
5 | (Indonesia) M Ahsan (Indonesia) H Setiawan | 21 | 21
(Chinese Taipei) Chiu H-c (Chinese Taipei) Yang M-t | 19 | 14

Quarter-finals
(Japan) K Matsui (Japan) Y Takeuchi | 20 | 16
5 | (Indonesia) M Ahsan (Indonesia) H Setiawan | 22 | 21

=== Bottom half ===
==== Section 3 ====
First round
(Indonesia) M S Fikri (Indonesia) B Maulana | 15 | 21 | 21
(Chinese Taipei) Lu C-y (Chinese Taipei) Yang P-ha | 21 | 11 | 12
(Chinese Taipei) Chang K-c (Chinese Taipei) Po L-w | 13 | 10
6 | (Indonesia) L R Carnando (Indonesia) D Marthin | 21 | 21
(Germany) M Lamsfuß (Germany) M Seidel | 23 | 21 | 21
Q4 | (Hong Kong) Chow H L (Hong Kong) Lui C W | 25 | 15 | 13
(China) Chen BY (China) Liu Y | 21 | 21
PFQ | (Republic of Ireland) J Magee (Republic of Ireland) P Reynolds | 15 | 9

Second round
(Indonesia) M S Fikri (Indonesia) B Maulana | 15 | 17
6 | (Indonesia) L R Carnando (Indonesia) D Marthin | 21 | 21
(Germany) M Lamsfuß (Germany) M Seidel | 21 | 17 | 21
(China) Chen BY (China) Liu Y | 16 | 21 | 18

Quarter-finals
6 | (Indonesia) L R Carnando (Indonesia) D Marthin | 18 | 21 | 21
(Germany) M Lamsfuß (Germany) M Seidel | 21 | 15 | 14

==== Section 4 ====
First round
(India) K P Garaga (India) V G Panjala | 14 | 19
Q3 | (South Korea) Ko S-h (South Korea) Shin B-c | 21 | 21
Q1 | (Malaysia) Chia W J (Malaysia) Liew X | 22 | 12 | 13
8 | (Chinese Taipei) Lee Y (Chinese Taipei) Wang C-l | 20 | 21 | 21
Q2 | (Hong Kong) Law C H (Hong Kong) Yeung S C | 21 | 11 | 15
(Chinese Taipei) Lee J-h (Chinese Taipei) Yang P-hs | 19 | 21 | 21
(Malaysia) Goh S F (Malaysia) N Izzuddin | w | / | o
2 | (Malaysia) A Chia (Malaysia) Soh W Y

Second round
Q3 | (South Korea) Ko S-h (South Korea) Shin B-c | 17 | 9
8 | (Chinese Taipei) Lee Y (Chinese Taipei) Wang C-l | 21 | 21
(Chinese Taipei) Lee J-h (Chinese Taipei) Yang P-hs | 13 | 15
(Malaysia) Goh S F (Malaysia) N Izzuddin | 21 | 21

Quarter-finals
8 | (Chinese Taipei) Lee Y (Chinese Taipei) Wang C-l | 21 | 21
(Malaysia) Goh S F (Malaysia) N Izzuddin | 19 | 18

== Women's doubles ==
=== Seeds ===
1. (Japan) Mayu Matsumoto / Wakana Nagahara (Quarter-finals)
2. (Japan) Yuki Fukushima / Sayaka Hirota (Second round)
3. (Japan) Nami Matsuyama / Chiharu Shida (Second round)
4. (Thailand) Jongkolphan Kititharakul / Rawinda Prajongjai (Quarter-finals)
5. (Thailand) Benyapa Aimsaard / Nuntakarn Aimsaard (Semi-finals)
6. (Malaysia) Pearly Tan / Thinaah Muralitharan (Final)
7. (Indonesia) Apriyani Rahayu / Siti Fadia Silva Ramadhanti (Champions)
8. (Japan) Rena Miyaura / Ayako Sakuramoto (Quarter-finals)

=== Finals ===
Semi-finals
5 | (Thailand) Benyapa Aimsaard (Thailand) Nuntakarn Aimsaard | 13 | 18
6 | (Malaysia) Pearly Tan (Malaysia) Thinaah Muralitharan | 21 | 21
(Denmark) Maiken Fruergaard (Denmark) Sara Thygesen | 16 | 21
7 | (Indonesia) Apriyani Rahayu (Indonesia) Siti Fadia Silva Ramadhanti | 21 | 23

Final
6 | (Malaysia) Pearly Tan (Malaysia) Thinaah Muralitharan | 21 | 22 | 9
7 | (Indonesia) Apriyani Rahayu (Indonesia) Siti Fadia Silva Ramadhanti | 14 | 24 | 21

=== Top half ===
==== Section 1 ====
First round
1 | (Japan) M Matsumoto (Japan) W Nagahara | 21 | 21
(Malaysia) V Hoo (Malaysia) Lim C S | 14 | 13
Q4 | (India) T Crasto (India) A Ponnappa | 21 | 21
(Chinese Taipei) Lee C-h (Chinese Taipei) Teng C-h | 19 | 19
5 | (Thailand) B Aimsaard (Thailand) N Aimsaard | 21 | 21
(Hong Kong) Yeung N T (Hong Kong) Yeung P L | 16 | 14
(Hong Kong) Lui L L (Hong Kong) Ng W Y | 22 | 18 | 22
(Chinese Taipei) Liu C-y (Chinese Taipei) Wang Y-q | 20 | 21 | 20

Second round
1 | (Japan) M Matsumoto (Japan) W Nagahara | 21 | 21
Q4 | (India) T Crasto (India) A Ponnappa | 18 | 7
5 | (Thailand) B Aimsaard (Thailand) N Aimsaard | 21 | 16 | 21
(Hong Kong) Lui L L (Hong Kong) Ng W Y | 12 | 21 | 13

Quarter-finals
1 | (Japan) M Matsumoto (Japan) W Nagahara | 21 | 23 | 14
5 | (Thailand) B Aimsaard (Thailand) N Aimsaard | 17 | 25 | 21

==== Section 2 ====
First round
4 | (Thailand) J Kititharakul (Thailand) R Prajongjai | 21 | 21
(Bulgaria) G Stoeva (Bulgaria) S Stoeva | 17 | 14
(Japan) R Iwanaga (Japan) K Nakanishi | 21 | 21
Q1 | (United States) P L Cao Hok (United States) L Lam | 7 | 13
6 | (Malaysia) P Tan (Malaysia) Thinaah M | 21 | 16 | 21
(Germany) L Efler (Germany) I Lohau | 10 | 21 | 14
(Malaysia) A Cheong (Malaysia) Teoh M X | 21 | 9 | 21
(Chinese Taipei) Chang C-h (Chinese Taipei) Yang C-t | 15 | 21 | 15

Second round
4 | (Thailand) J Kititharakul (Thailand) R Prajongjai | 21 | 14 | 23
(Japan) R Iwanaga (Japan) K Nakanishi | 14 | 21 | 21
6 | (Malaysia) P Tan (Malaysia) Thinaah M | 21 | 21
(Malaysia) A Cheong (Malaysia) Teoh M X | 7 | 10

Quarter-finals
4 | (Thailand) J Kititharakul (Thailand) R Prajongjai | 21 | 14 | 19
6 | (Malaysia) P Tan (Malaysia) Thinaah M | 15 | 21 | 21

=== Bottom half ===
==== Section 3 ====
First round
Q2 | (Chinese Taipei) Hu L-f (Chinese Taipei) Lin X-m | 16 | 21 | 15
(China) Keng SL (China) Zhang C | 21 | 14 | 21
(Japan) R Hirokami (Japan) Y Kato | 17 | 19
8 | (Japan) R Miyaura (Japan) A Sakuramoto | 21 | 21
(Denmark) M Fruergaard (Denmark) S Thygesen | 16 | 24 | 24
(China) Li YJ (China) Luo XM | 21 | 22 | 22
(China) Liu SS (China) Tan N | 21 | 15 | 14
3 | (Japan) N Matsuyama (Japan) C Shida | 10 | 21 | 21

Second round
(China) Keng SL (China) Zhang C | 7 | 14
8 | (Japan) R Miyaura (Japan) A Sakuramoto | 21 | 21
(Denmark) M Fruergaard (Denmark) S Thygesen | 22 | 21
3 | (Japan) N Matsuyama (Japan) C Shida | 20 | 16

Quarter-finals
8 | (Japan) R Miyaura (Japan) A Sakuramoto | 19 | 18
(Denmark) M Fruergaard (Denmark) S Thygesen | 21 | 21

==== Section 4 ====
First round
(India) T Jolly (India) G Gopichand | 21 | 16 | 21
(Netherlands) D Jille (Netherlands) C Seinen | 15 | 21 | 16
(Indonesia) F D Kusuma (Indonesia) A C Pratiwi | 19 | 19
7 | (Indonesia) A Rahayu (Indonesia) S F S Ramadhanti | 21 | 21
Q3 | (Hong Kong) Ng T Y (Hong Kong) Tsang H Y | 13 | 6
(China) Li WM (China) Liu XX | 21 | 21
(Chinese Taipei) Hsu Y-c (Chinese Taipei) Lin W-c | 14 | 11
2 | (Japan) Y Fukushima (Japan) S Hirota | 21 | 21

Second round
(India) T Jolly (India) G Gopichand | 8 | 14
7 | (Indonesia) A Rahayu (Indonesia) S F S Ramadhanti | 21 | 21
(China) Li WM (China) Liu XX | w | / | o
2 | (Japan) Y Fukushima (Japan) S Hirota

Quarter-finals
7 | (Indonesia) A Rahayu (Indonesia) S F S Ramadhanti | 21 | 21
(China) Li WM (China) Liu XX | 15 | 13

== Mixed doubles ==
=== Seeds ===
1. (Japan) Yuta Watanabe / Arisa Higashino (Withdrew)
2. (France) Thom Gicquel / Delphine Delrue (Quarter-finals)
3. (Netherlands) Robin Tabeling / Selena Piek (First round)
4. (Malaysia) Goh Soon Huat / Shevon Jemie Lai (Semi-finals)
5. (Denmark) Mathias Christiansen / Alexandra Bøje (First round)
6. (Indonesia) Rehan Naufal Kusharjanto / Lisa Ayu Kusumawati (Second round)
7. (Japan) Kyohei Yamashita / Naru Shinoya (First round)
8. (Chinese Taipei) Ye Hong-wei / Lee Chia-hsin (First round)

=== Finals ===
Semi-finals
(China) Guo Xinwa (China) Wei Yaxin | 21 | 21
(Japan) Hiroki Midorikawa (Japan) Natsu Saito | 19 | 18
4 | (Malaysia) Goh Soon Huat (Malaysia) Shevon Jemie Lai | 12 | 12
(Hong Kong) Tang Chun Man (Hong Kong) Tse Ying Suet | 21 | 21

Final
(China) Guo Xinwa (China) Wei Yaxin | 21 | 21
(Hong Kong) Tang Chun Man (Hong Kong) Tse Ying Suet | 13 | 19

=== Top half ===
==== Section 1 ====
First round
PFQ | (Malaysia) Chan P S (Malaysia) Cheah Y S | 15 | 5
(China) Guo XW (China) Wei YX | 21 | 21
Q2 | (India) B S Reddy (India) A Ponnappa | 16 | 21 | 18
(Malaysia) Chen T J (Malaysia) Toh E W | 21 | 16 | 21
8 | (Chinese Taipei) Ye H-w (Chinese Taipei) Lee C-h | 15 | 12
(China) Cheng X (China) Chen FH | 21 | 21
(Singapore) T Hee (Singapore) J Tan | 21 | 21
(India) R Kapoor (India) S Reddy | 19 | 10

Second round
(China) Guo XW (China) Wei YX | 21 | 12 | 21
(Malaysia) Chen T J (Malaysia) Toh E W | 18 | 21 | 19
(China) Cheng X (China) Chen FH | 13 | 15
(Singapore) T Hee (Singapore) J Tan | 21 | 21

Quarter-finals
(China) Guo XW (China) Wei YX | 21 | 22
(Singapore) T Hee (Singapore) J Tan | 12 | 20

==== Section 2 ====
First round
3 | (Netherlands) R Tabeling (Netherlands) S Piek | 24 | 12
(Germany) M Lamsfuß (Germany) I Lohau | 26 | 21
PFQ | (Indonesia) A Maulana (Indonesia) N V Marwah | 18 | 23 | 21
(Chinese Taipei) Chang K-c (Chinese Taipei) Lee C-c | 21 | 21 | 15
7 | (Japan) K Yamashita (Japan) N Shinoya | 15 | 17
(Malaysia) Tan K M (Malaysia) Lai P J | 21 | 21
(Japan) H Midorikawa (Japan) N Saito | 21 | 21
(Indonesia) P Jordan (Indonesia) M D Oktavianti | 12 | 16

Second round
(Germany) M Lamsfuß (Germany) I Lohau | 21 | 21
PFQ | (Indonesia) A Maulana (Indonesia) N V Marwah | 19 | 18
(Malaysia) Tan K M (Malaysia) Lai P J | 16 | 18
(Japan) H Midorikawa (Japan) N Saito | 21 | 21

Quarter-finals
(Germany) M Lamsfuß (Germany) I Lohau | 20 | 13
(Japan) H Midorikawa (Japan) N Saito | 22 | 21

=== Bottom half ===
==== Section 3 ====
First round
Q4 | (Chinese Taipei) Lee J-h (Chinese Taipei) Hsu Y-c | 13 | 19
(Indonesia) R Rivaldy (Indonesia) P H Mentari | 21 | 21
Q1 | (Chinese Taipei) Chiu H-c (Chinese Taipei) Lin X-m | 21 | 21 | 23
5 | (Denmark) M Christiansen (Denmark) A Bøje | 16 | 23 | 21
(Chinese Taipei) Yang P-hs (Chinese Taipei) Hu L-f | 21 | 21
(China) Jiang ZB (China) Li Q | 12 | 16
(Japan) Y Kaneko (Japan) M Matsutomo | 14 | 9
4 | (Malaysia) Goh S H (Malaysia) S J Lai | 21 | 21

Second round
(Indonesia) R Rivaldy (Indonesia) P H Mentari | 21 | 21
Q1 | (Chinese Taipei) Chiu H-c (Chinese Taipei) Lin X-m | 9 | 14
(Chinese Taipei) Yang P-hs (Chinese Taipei) Hu L-f | 12 | 9
4 | (Malaysia) Goh S H (Malaysia) S J Lai | 21 | 21

Quarter-finals
(Indonesia) R Rivaldy (Indonesia) P H Mentari | 10 | 18
4 | (Malaysia) Goh S H (Malaysia) S J Lai | 21 | 21

==== Section 4 ====
First round
(Hong Kong) Tang C M (Hong Kong) Tse Y S | 18 | 21 | 21
(Hong Kong) Lee C H (Hong Kong) Ng T Y | 21 | 13 | 16
(Malaysia) Hoo P R (Malaysia) Teoh M X | 12 | 13
6 | (Indonesia) R N Kusharjanto (Indonesia) L A Kusumawati | 21 | 21
Q3 | (Malaysia) Yap R K (Malaysia) V Siow | 19 | 21 | 23
(England) G Mairs (England) J Mairs | 21 | 16 | 25
(Indonesia) D Ferdinansyah (Indonesia) G E Widjaja | 18 | 20
2 | (France) T Gicquel (France) D Delrue | 21 | 22

Second round
(Hong Kong) Tang C M (Hong Kong) Tse Y S | 20 | 21 | 21
6 | (Indonesia) R N Kusharjanto (Indonesia) L A Kusumawati | 22 | 14 | 10
(England) G Mairs (England) J Mairs | 15 | 19
2 | (France) T Gicquel (France) D Delrue | 21 | 21

Quarter-finals
(Hong Kong) Tang C M (Hong Kong) Tse Y S | 19 | 21 | 21
2 | (France) T Gicquel (France) D Delrue | 21 | 9 | 11

| Preceded by 2023 China Open; 2023 Indonesia Masters Super 100 I | BWF World Tour; 2023 BWF season | Succeeded by 2023 Kaohsiung Masters |
