= Putri Kusuma Wardani =

Indonesian badminton player (born 2002)

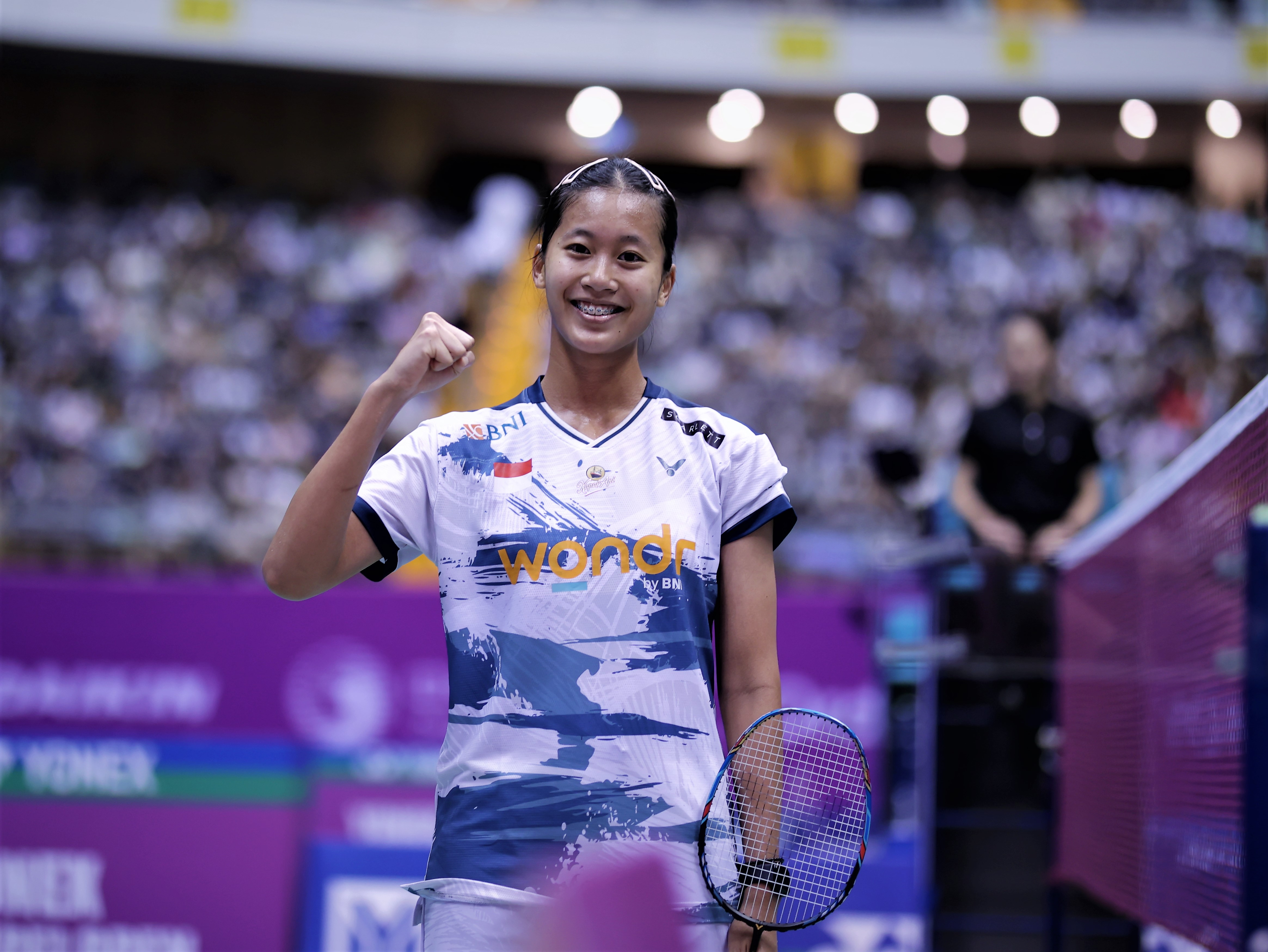
- Wardani at the 2024 Taipei Open

Personal information
- Nickname: Putri KW
- Born: 20 July 2002 (age 24) Tangerang, Banten, Indonesia
- Height: 1.72 m (5 ft 8 in)
- Weight: 56 kg (123 lb)

Sport
- Country: Indonesia
- Sport: Badminton
- Handedness: Right

Women's singles
- Highest ranking: 6 (23 December 2025)
- Current ranking: 9 (10 November 2026)
- BWF profile
Medal record
Women's badminton
Representing Indonesia
World Championships
Bronze medal – third place	2025 Paris	Women's singles
Sudirman Cup
Bronze medal – third place	2025 Xiamen	Mixed team
Uber Cup
Bronze medal – third place	2026 Horsens	Women's team
Asian Games
Bronze medal – third place	2026 Aichi–Nagoya	Women's team
Asia Mixed Team Championships
Gold medal – first place	2025 Qingdao	Mixed team
Asia Team Championships
Gold medal – first place	2022 Selangor	Women's team
Bronze medal – third place	2024 Selangor	Women's team
SEA Games
Silver medal – second place	2021 Vietnam	Women's team
Silver medal – second place	2025 Thailand	Women's team
Bronze medal – third place	2021 Vietnam	Women's singles
Bronze medal – third place	2025 Thailand	Women's singles
World Junior Championships
Gold medal – first place	2019 Kazan	Mixed team
Bronze medal – third place	2018 Markham	Mixed team
Asian Junior Championships
Silver medal – second place	2019 Suzhou	Mixed team
Bronze medal – third place	2018 Jakarta	Mixed team

Putri Kusuma Wardani (born 20 July 2002) is an Indonesian badminton player affiliated with Exist Jakarta club. She is the bronze medalist at 2025 BWF World Championships.

== Career ==
Trained in Exist Jakarta club, Wardani joined the Indonesia national training center in 2018. In the national tournament, she was part of the Exist team that won the 2018 Superliga Junior. She was selected to join national team squad to compete at the 2018 Asian and World Junior Championships, and secured bronze medals in both tournaments. At the age of 16, she reached the final of a senior tournament Bangladesh International Challenge but proved second best to Vietnamese player Nguyễn Thùy Linh.

In 2019, Wardani finished as finalist at the Junior Grand Prix tournament Jaya Raya Junior International. Later she won the Jakarta Junior International Series beating her compatriot Maharani Sekar Batari. In the team event, she helped the National team finish as runner-up in the Asian Junior and won the first Suhandinata Cup for Indonesia by defeating China in the mixed team final of the World Junior Championships.

In 2021, Wardani claimed her first Super 300 event title at the Spain Masters by defeating Line Christophersen of Denmark in the final at the age of 18. She then won the Czech Open and Bangladesh International.

In 2022, Wardani was featured on the Indonesian women's winning team at the Asia Team Championships. Wardani claimed her second World Tour title at the Orléans Masters by defeating Iris Wang in the final in a close rubber game. In May, she competed at the SEA Games, and won a silver medal in the women's team event and a bronze in the individual event. In her debut at the World Championships, she was immediately eliminated in the first round to Soniia Cheah.

=== 2023–2024: Korea Masters title ===
Entering the 2023 season, Wardani began to regularly participate in the BWF grade 2 events. In the nine BWF World Tours she participated in during the first semester of 2023, her best performance was reaching the quarter-finals in the Swiss Open, Orléans Masters and Taipei Open. The rest, she had to suffer defeat in the early rounds of the Indonesia Masters, Thailand Masters, Spain Masters, Malaysia Masters, Thailand Open and Indonesia Open. She also took part in her second Asian Championships, but had to lose in the first round. Apart from that, she was also a member of the Indonesian team that competed in the Asia Mixed Team Championships and Sudirman Cup, but the team had to fall in the quarter-finals in both events.

In the second semester of 2023, Wardani navigated a demanding period of her career characterized by a series of tough draws against the world's elite. Following her early-season efforts, the latter half of the year saw her frequently tested by top-tier opposition, resulting in several early-round exits. In July, she lost to An Se-young in the second round of the Korea Open. In August, she loss to Sim Yu-jin at the Australian Open, and showed remarkable tenacity in the second round of the World Championships, forcing He Bingjiao to a rubber. In September, she lost to Akane Yamaguchi and Han Yue at the China and Hong Kong Open respectively. At the Hangzhou Asian Games she lost to He Bingjiao in the team event, and eliminated by P. V. Sindhu in the third round of the individual women's singles. In October, she was soundly defeated by Chen Yufei in the Denmark Open, and then lost to Carolina Marín at the French Open.

Wardani experienced a remarkable resurgence that signaled her return to top-tier competitiveness in 2024. Early in the year, she played a key role in the Asia Team Championships, where her efforts helped the Indonesian squad reach the semi-finals to secure a bronze medal. This collective success paved the way for her individual breakthrough during the September Asian swing, where she reached back-to-back finals at the Taipei and the Hong Kong Open. These performances showcased a newfound tactical maturity and mental grit, especially as she took down several higher-ranked opponents. The ultimate validation of her hard work came in November at the Korea Masters, where she ended her title drought with a dominant performance to claim the title.

=== 2025: World Championships bronze ===
In 2025, Wardani significantly improving her performance from the previous year to reach a career-high world ranking of number 6. Her season was highlighted by a historic run at the World Championships in Paris, where she broke a ten-year medal drought for Indonesian women's singles by securing the bronze medal. Her season began with a triumphant start as she was part of the Indonesian squad to win the Asia Team Championships. She was selected to join the Indonesia squad at the Sudirman Cup, where the team finished in the semi-finals and won the bronze medal. Wardani reached her first final of the year at the Hylo Open in October where she lost to Mia Blichfeldt. Her next final also end in a lost which she was beaten by An Se-young in Australian Open. In December, she made her second appearance at the SEA Games, and snatched the silver medal in the team event and bronze in women's singles. She qualified to compete in the World Tour Finals in Hangzhou, finishing third in the group stage.

=== 2026 ===
Wardani started the season with quarter-finals appearances in the first two Super 1000 (Malaysia Open and All England Open). On the next week after the All England Open, Wardani reached the final of the Swiss Open, lost the final match against Supanida Katethong. She made her second appearance at the Asian Games in Aichi–Nagoya, and managed to win the bronze medal in the women's team event.

== Achievements ==
=== World Championships ===
Women's singles
Year	Venue	Opponent	Score	Result	Ref.
2025	Adidas Arena, Paris, France	(Japan) Akane Yamaguchi	17–21, 21–14, 6–21	Bronze	

=== SEA Games ===
Women's singles
Year	Venue	Opponent	Score	Result	Ref.
2021	Bac Giang Gymnasium, Bắc Giang, Vietnam	(Thailand) Pornpawee Chochuwong	16–21, 9–21	Bronze	
2025	Gymnasium 4, Thammasat University Rangsit Campus, Pathum Thani, Thailand	(Thailand) Supanida Katethong	18–21, 16–21	Bronze	

=== BWF World Tour (3 titles, 5 runners-up) ===
The BWF World Tour, which was announced on 19 March 2017 and implemented in 2018, is a series of elite badminton tournaments sanctioned by the Badminton World Federation (BWF). The BWF World Tour is divided into levels of World Tour Finals, Super 1000, Super 750, Super 500, Super 300 (part of the HSBC World Tour), and the BWF Tour Super 100.

Women's singles
Year	Tournament	Level	Opponent	Score	Result	Ref.
2021	Spain Masters	Super 300	(Denmark) Line Christophersen	21–15, 21–10	(gold) Winner	
2022	Orléans Masters	Super 100	(United States) Iris Wang	7–21, 21–19, 21–18	(gold) Winner	
2024	Taipei Open	Super 300	(South Korea) Sim Yu-jin	17–21, 13–21	(silver) Runner-up	
2024	Hong Kong Open	Super 500	(China) Han Yue	18–21, 7–21	(silver) Runner-up	
2024	Korea Masters	Super 300	(China) Han Qianxi	21–14, 21–14	(gold) Winner	
2025	Hylo Open	Super 500	(Denmark) Mia Blichfeldt	11–21, 21–7, 12–21	(silver) Runner-up	
2025	Australian Open	Super 500	(South Korea) An Se-young	16–21, 14–21	(silver) Runner-up	
2026	Swiss Open	Super 300	(Thailand) Supanida Katethong	11–21, 15–21	(silver) Runner-up	

=== BWF International Challenge/Series (2 titles, 1 runner-up) ===
Women's singles
Year	Tournament	Opponent	Score	Result	Ref.
2018	Bangladesh International	(Vietnam) Nguyễn Thùy Linh	18–21, 19–21	(silver) Runner-up	
2021	Czech Open	(Malaysia) Siti Nurshuhaini	21–16, 21–5	(gold) Winner	
2021	Bangladesh International	(Indonesia) Tasya Farahnailah	21–12, 21–8	(gold) Winner	

BWF International Challenge tournament
BWF International Series tournament
BWF Future Series tournament

=== BWF Junior International (1 title, 1 runner-up) ===
Girls' singles
Year	Tournament	Opponent	Score	Result	Ref.
2019	Jakarta Junior International	(Indonesia) Maharani Sekar Batari	21–19, 21–18	(gold) Winner	
2019	Jaya Raya Junior International	(China) Dai Wang	21–13, 11–21, 19–21	(silver) Runner-up	

BWF Junior International Grand Prix tournament
BWF Junior International Challenge tournament
BWF Junior International Series tournament
BWF Junior Future Series tournament

== Performance timeline ==
Key

W	Won	F	Finalist	SF	Semi-finalist
QF	Quarter-finalist	#R	Rounds 4, 3, 2, 1	RR	Round-robin stage
Q#	Qualification round	A	Absent	w/d	Withdrew
G	Gold	S	Silver	B	Bronze
NH	Not held	N/A	Not applicable	DNQ	Did not qualify

=== National team ===
- Junior level

Team events	2018	2019	Ref
Asian Junior Championships	B	S	
World Junior Championships	B	G	

- Senior level

Team events	2020	2021	2022	2023	2024	2025	2026	Ref
SEA Games	NH	S	NH	A	NH	S	NH	
Asia Team Championships	QF	NH	G	NH	B	NH	A	
Asia Mixed Team Championships	NH			QF	NH	G	NH	
Asian Games	NH		QF	NH			B	>
Uber Cup	QF	NH	A	NH	A	NH	B	
Sudirman Cup	NH	QF	NH	QF	NH	B	NH	

=== Individual competitions ===
- Junior level

Events	2018	2019
Asian Junior Championships	2R	QF
World Junior Championships	4R	QF

- Senior level

Events	2021	2022	2023	2024	2025	2026	Ref
SEA Games	B	NH	A	NH	B	NH	
Asian Championships	NH	2R	1R	1R	1R	2R	
Asian Games	NH	3R	NH			3R	
World Championships	DNQ	1R	2R	NH	B	3R	

Tournament	BWF World Tour									Best	Ref
Tournament	2018	2019	2020	2021	2022	2023	2024	2025	2026	Best	Ref
Malaysia Open	A		NH		1R	A	1R	QF	QF	QF ('25, '26)	
India Open	A		NH		A				QF	QF ('26)	
Indonesia Masters	A				1R	2R	2R	QF	2R	QF ('25)	
Thailand Masters	A			NH	NA	1R	A	SF	A	SF ('25)	
All England Open	A							2R	QF	QF ('26)	
Swiss Open	A		NH	A		QF	1R	SF	F	F ('26)	
Orléans Masters	A		NH	QF	W	QF	A			W ('22)	
Thailand Open	A			NH	A	1R	1R	1R	A	1R ('23, '24, '25)	
Malaysia Masters	A			NH	1R	1R	QF	QF	A	QF ('24, '25)	
Singapore Open	A		NH		1R	A			1R	1R ('22, '26)	
Indonesia Open	A		NH	A		2R	1R	QF	QF	QF ('25, '26)	
Australian Open	A		NH		2R	1R	QF	F	A	F ('25)	
Macau Open	A		NH				QF	A		QF ('24)	
Japan Open	A		NH		A			QF	SF	SF ('26)	
China Open	A		NH			1R	A	1R	QF	QF ('26)	
Taipei Open	A		NH		w/d	QF	F	A		F ('24)	
Korea Masters	A		NH		A	1R	W	A		W ('24)	
China Masters	A		NH			A		QF	w/d	QF ('25)	
Indonesia Masters Super 100	2R	A	NH		2R	A				2R ('18, '22)	
Vietnam Open	A		NH		w/d	A				—	
Arctic Open	N/A		NH			A	2R	A		2R ('24)	
Denmark Open	A					1R	SF	2R	QF	SF ('24)	
French Open	A		NH	A		2R	A	1R	QF	QF ('26)	
Hylo Open	A							F	A	F ('25)	
Korea Open	A		NH		A	2R	A	SF	A	SF ('25)	
Japan Masters	NH					1R	1R	A	1R	1R ('23, '24, '26)	
Hong Kong Open	A		NH			2R	F	A	QF	F ('24)	
World Tour Finals	DNQ							RR	DNQ	RR ('25)	
Spain Masters	A			W	NH	2R	2R	NH		W ('21)	
Year-end ranking	177	276	261	72	46	32	18	6		6	
Tournament	2018	2019	2020	2021	2022	2023	2024	2025	2026	Best	Ref

== Record against selected opponents ==
Record against Year-end Finals finalists, World Championships semi-finalists, and Olympic quarter-finalists. Accurate as of 23 December 2025.

Players	Matches	Results		Difference
Players	Matches	Won	Lost	Difference
(China) Chen Yufei	3	0	3	–3
(China) Han Yue	5	0	5	–5
(China) He Bingjiao	4	0	4	–4
(China) Wang Zhiyi	6	0	6	–6
(China) Zhang Yiman	1	0	1	–1
(Chinese Taipei) Tai Tzu-ying	2	2	0	+2
(India) P. V. Sindhu	6	3	3	0
(Indonesia) Gregoria Mariska Tunjung	2	1	1	0

Players	Matches	Results		Difference
Players	Matches	Won	Lost	Difference
(Japan) Aya Ohori	3	2	1	+1
(Japan) Nozomi Okuhara	2	1	1	0
(Japan) Akane Yamaguchi	7	0	7	–7
(South Korea) An Se-young	7	0	7	–7
(Spain) Carolina Marín	1	0	1	–1
(Thailand) Porntip Buranaprasertsuk	1	0	1	–1
(Thailand) Ratchanok Intanon	2	1	1	0
