= 2019 BWF World Championships – Women's singles =

Badminton tournament in Switzerland

Women's singles at the 2019 BWF World Championships
- Venue: St. Jakobshalle
- Location: Basel, Switzerland
- Dates: 19–25 August

Medalists
| gold medal | P. V. Sindhu | India |
| silver medal | Nozomi Okuhara | Japan |
| bronze medal | Ratchanok Intanon | Thailand |
| bronze medal | Chen Yufei | China |

The women's singles tournament of the 2019 BWF World Championships (World Badminton Championships) took place from 19 to 25 August. The Badminton World Federation has conducted a re-draw of the women's singles event on 9 August, because a player had mistakenly been included in the entry list.

== Seeds ==
The seeding list is based on the World Rankings from 30 July 2019.

1. (Japan) Akane Yamaguchi (second round)
2. (Chinese Taipei) Tai Tzu-ying (quarterfinals)
3. (Japan) Nozomi Okuhara (final)
4. (China) Chen Yufei (semifinals)
5. (India) P. V. Sindhu (champion)
6. (China) He Bingjiao (quarterfinals)
7. (Thailand) Ratchanok Intanon (semifinals)
8. (India) Saina Nehwal (third round)

9. (United States) Zhang Beiwen (third round)
10. (South Korea) Sung Ji-hyun (third round)
11. (Canada) Michelle Li (third round)
12. (Denmark) Mia Blichfeldt (quarterfinals)
13. (China) Han Yue (third round)
14. (Indonesia) Gregoria Mariska Tunjung (third round)
15. (Denmark) Line Kjærsfeldt (second round)
16. (China) Cai Yanyan (second round)

Click on the seed number of a player to go to their draw section.

== Draw ==
=== Finals ===
Semifinals
7 | (Thailand) Ratchanok Intanon | 21 | 18 | 15
3 | (Japan) Nozomi Okuhara | 17 | 21 | 21
4 | (China) Chen Yufei | 7 | 14
5 | (India) P. V. Sindhu | 21 | 21

Final
3 | (Japan) Nozomi Okuhara | 7 | 7
5 | (India) P. V. Sindhu | 21 | 21

=== Top half ===
==== Section 1 ====
First Round
(Singapore) Yeo J M | 21 | 21
(Turkey) A Demirbağ | 13 | 13
(Estonia) K Kuuba | 12 | 15
(Vietnam) Vũ T T | 21 | 21
(Thailand) N Jindapol | 21 | 21
(United States) C Pan | 9 | 14
(Thailand) B Ongbamrungphan | 21 | 21
(England) C Birch | 16 | 16

Second Round
1 | (Japan) A Yamaguchi | 14 | 18
(Singapore) Yeo J M | 21 | 21
15 | (Denmark) L Kjærsfeldt | 19 | 21 | 11
(Vietnam) Vũ T T | 21 | 13 | 21
7 | (Thailand) R Intanon | 22 | 21
(Thailand) N Jindapol | 20 | 14
14 | (Indonesia) G M Tunjung | 21 | 21
(Thailand) B Ongbamrungphan | 14 | 10

Third Round
(Singapore) Yeo J M | 21 | 14 | 21
(Vietnam) Vũ T T | 15 | 21 | 16
7 | (Thailand) R Intanon | 18 | 23 | 21
14 | (Indonesia) G M Tunjung | 21 | 21 | 10

Quarterfinals
(Singapore) Yeo J M | 17 | 11
7 | (Thailand) R Intanon | 21 | 21

==== Section 2 ====
First Round
(Russia) E Kosetskaya | 21 | 21
(Turkey) N Yiğit | 17 | 19
(Germany) F Deprez | 16 | 11
(South Korea) Kim H-m | 21 | 21
(Hong Kong) Cheung N Y | 11 | 9
(Japan) A Ohori | 21 | 21
(Japan) S Takahashi | 21 | 21
(Scotland) K Gilmour | 10 | 13

Second Round
3 | (Japan) N Okuhara | 21 | 21
(Russia) E Kosetskaya | 12 | 14
10 | (South Korea) Sung J-h | 21 | 21
(South Korea) Kim H-m | 9 | 8
6 | (China) He BJ | 21 | 18 | 21
(Japan) A Ohori | 15 | 21 | 12
13 | (China) Han Y | 23 | 21
(Japan) S Takahashi | 21 | 10

Third Round
3 | (Japan) N Okuhara | 21 | 21
10 | (South Korea) Sung J-h | 18 | 13
6 | (China) He BJ | 21 | 21
13 | (China) Han Y | 18 | 14

Quarterfinals
3 | (Japan) N Okuhara | 21 | 21
6 | (China) He BJ | 7 | 18

=== Bottom half ===
==== Section 3 ====
First Round
(Vietnam) Nguyễn T L | 22 | 20 | 13
(Belgium) L Tan | 20 | 22 | 21
(Switzerland) S Jaquet | 17 | 15
(Netherlands) S de Visch Eijbergen | 21 | 21
(Hong Kong) Yip P Y | 8 | 18
(Malaysia) S Cheah S Y | 21 | 21
(Thailand) P Chochuwong | 21 | 21
(Canada) R Honderich | 15 | 5

Second Round
(Belgium) L Tan | 8 | 16
12 | (Denmark) M Blichfeldt | 21 | 21
(Netherlands) S de Visch Eijbergen | 10 | 11
8 | (India) S Nehwal | 21 | 21
(Malaysia) S Cheah S Y | 19 | 4
11 | (Canada) M Li | 21 | 21
(Thailand) P Chochuwong | 14 | 19
4 | (China) Chen YF | 21 | 21

Third Round
12 | (Denmark) M Blichfeldt | 15 | 27 | 21
8 | (India) S Nehwal | 21 | 25 | 12
11 | (Canada) M Li | 18 | 21 | 17
4 | (China) Chen YF | 21 | 17 | 21

Quarterfinals
12 | (Denmark) M Blichfeldt | 17 | 21 | 15
4 | (China) Chen YF | 21 | 18 | 21

==== Section 4 ====
First Round
(Bulgaria) M Mitsova | 18 | 12
(Australia) Chen H-y | 21 | 21
(Chinese Taipei) Pai Y-p | 21 | 21
(Bulgaria) L Zetchiri | 18 | 17
(Israel) K Polikarpova | 18 | 14
(South Korea) Kim G-e | 21 | 21
(Germany) Y Li | 14 | 12
(Indonesia) Fitriani | 21 | 21

Second Round
(Australia) Chen H-y | 14 | 13
9 | (United States) Zhang BW | 21 | 21
(Chinese Taipei) Pai Y-p | 14 | 15
5 | (India) P. V. Sindhu | 21 | 21
(South Korea) Kim G-e | 21 | 16 | 21
16 | (China) Cai YY | 14 | 21 | 10
(Indonesia) Fitriani | 15 | 14
2 | (Chinese Taipei) Tai T-y | 21 | 21

Third Round
9 | (United States) Zhang BW | 14 | 6
5 | (India) P. V. Sindhu | 21 | 21
(South Korea) Kim G-e | 22 | 22
2 | (Chinese Taipei) Tai T-y | 24 | 24

Quarterfinals
5 | (India) P. V. Sindhu | 12 | 23 | 21
2 | (Chinese Taipei) Tai T-y | 21 | 21 | 19
