= 2021 BWF World Championships – Women's singles =

Badminton championships

Women's singles at the 2021 BWF World Championships
- Venue: Palacio de los Deportes Carolina Marín
- Location: Huelva, Spain
- Dates: 12–19 December

Medalists
gold medal	Akane Yamaguchi	Japan
silver medal	Tai Tzu-ying	Chinese Taipei
bronze medal	He Bingjiao	China
bronze medal	Zhang Yiman	China

The women's singles tournament of the 2021 BWF World Championships took place from 12 to 19 December 2021 at the Palacio de los Deportes Carolina Marín at Huelva.

P. V. Sindhu was the defending champion, but she lost to Tai Tzu-Ying in the quarterfinals. This also guaranteed Tai Tzu-Ying's first medal of world championships.

== Seeds ==
The seeding list is based on the World Rankings of 23 November 2021.

1. (Chinese Taipei) Tai Tzu-ying (final)
2. (Japan) Akane Yamaguchi (champion)
3. (Japan) Nozomi Okuhara (withdrew)
4. (Spain) Carolina Marín (withdrew)
5. (South Korea) An Se-young (quarter-finals)
6. (India) P. V. Sindhu (quarter-finals)
7. (Thailand) Ratchanok Intanon (quarter-finals)
8. (China) He Bingjiao (semi-finals)
9. (Thailand) Pornpawee Chochuwong (third round)
10. (Canada) Michelle Li (third round)
11. (Thailand) Busanan Ongbamrungphan (second round)
12. (Japan) Sayaka Takahashi (third round)
13. (Denmark) Mia Blichfeldt (third round)
14. (China) Wang Zhiyi (third round)
15. (Singapore) Yeo Jia Min (second round)
16. (South Korea) Kim Ga-eun (third round)

== Draw ==
=== Finals ===
Semi-finals
1	(Chinese Taipei) Tai Tzu-ying	21	13	21
8	(China) He Bingjiao	17	21	14
(China) Zhang Yiman	19	19
2	(Japan) Akane Yamaguchi	21	21

Final
1	(Chinese Taipei) Tai Tzu-ying	14	11
2	(Japan) Akane Yamaguchi	21	21

=== Top half ===
==== Section 1 ====
First Round
(Russia) E Kosetskaya	21	21
(Spain) C Azurmendi	11	11
(Japan) A Ohori	19	17
(Scotland) K Gilmour	21	21
(Slovakia) M Repiská	w	/	o
(Indonesia) R Hartawan
(Australia) Chen H-y	16	19
(Belgium) L Tan	21	21

Second Round
1	(Chinese Taipei) Tai T-y	21	21
(Russia) E Kosetskaya	10	14
15	(Singapore) Yeo J M	15	21	15
(Scotland) K Gilmour	21	8	21
6	(India) P. V. Sindhu	21	21
(Slovakia) M Repiská	7	9
9	(Thailand) P Chochuwong	21	21
(Belgium) L Tan	13	14

Third Round
1	(Chinese Taipei) Tai T-y	21	19	21
(Scotland) K Gilmour	10	21	11
6	(India) P. V. Sindhu	21	21
9	(Thailand) P Chochuwong	14	18

Quarter-finals
1	(Chinese Taipei) Tai T-y	21	21
6	(India) P. V. Sindhu	17	13

==== Section 2 ====
First Round
(Vietnam) Nguyễn T L	16	14
(China) Han Y	21	21
(Israel) K Polikarpova	13	12
(Denmark) J D Jakobsen	21	21
(France) M Batomene	17	21	21
(Russia) N Perminova	21	9	16
(Turkey) N Yiğit	21	21
(Malaysia) Kisona S	14	15

Second Round
4	(Spain) C Marín
(China) Han Y	w	/	o
10	(Canada) M Li	21	21
(Denmark) J D Jakobsen	19	18
8	(China) He BJ	21	21
(France) M Batomene	12	15
13	(Denmark) M Blichfeldt	17	21	22
(Turkey) N Yiğit	21	13	20

Third Round
(China) Han Y	21	21
10	(Canada) M Li	19	19
8	(China) He BJ	21	21
13	(Denmark) M Blichfeldt	13	10

Quarter-finals
(China) Han Y	16	18
8	(China) He BJ	21	21

=== Bottom half ===
==== Section 3 ====
First Round
(Indonesia) G M Tunjung
(Denmark) L Christophersen	w	/	o
(Estonia) K Kuuba	11	14
(Hong Kong) Yip P Y	21	21
(Turkey) A Demirbağ	10	9
(Thailand) P Chaiwan	21	21
(China) Zhang YM	21	21
(Hong Kong) Cheung N Y	10	13

Second Round
(Denmark) L Christophersen	3
11	(Thailand) B Ongbamrungphan	1^{r}
(Hong Kong) Yip P Y	8	12
7	(Thailand) R Intanon	21	21
(Thailand) P Chaiwan	18	22
16	(South Korea) Kim G-e	21	24
(China) Zhang YM	w	/	o
3	(Japan) N Okuhara

Third Round
(Denmark) L Christophersen	21	9
7	(Thailand) R Intanon	23	21
16	(South Korea) Kim G-e	16	19
(China) Zhang YM	21	21

Quarter-finals
7	(Thailand) R Intanon	21	13	15
(China) Zhang YM	13	21	21

==== Section 4 ====
First Round
(Vietnam) Vũ T T	14	20
(Germany) Y Li	21	22
(Netherlands) S de Visch Eijbergen	5	8
(United States) I Wang	21	21
(Myanmar) Thet Htar T	15	16
(Chinese Taipei) Pai Y-p	21	21
(Denmark) L Kjærsfeldt	12	21	21
(France) Qi XF	21	14	15

Second Round
(Germany) Y Li	7	17
14	(China) Wang ZY	21	21
(United States) I Wang	7	15
5	(South Korea) An S-y	21	21
(Chinese Taipei) Pai Y-p	13	14
12	(Japan) S Takahashi	21	21
(Denmark) L Kjærsfeldt	13	15
2	(Japan) A Yamaguchi	21	21

Third Round
14	(China) Wang ZY	21	20	19
5	(South Korea) An S-y	17	22	21
12	(Japan) S Takahashi	15	18
2	(Japan) A Yamaguchi	21	21

Quarter-finals
5	(South Korea) An S-y	7	21	10
2	(Japan) A Yamaguchi	21	11	21
