= 2022 BWF World Championships – Women's singles =

Badminton championships

Women's singles at the 2022 BWF World Championships
- Venue: Tokyo Metropolitan Gymnasium
- Location: Tokyo, Japan
- Dates: 22–28 August
- Competitors: 45 from 24 nations

Medalists
gold medal	Akane Yamaguchi	Japan
silver medal	Chen Yufei	China
bronze medal	An Se-young	South Korea
bronze medal	Tai Tzu-ying	Chinese Taipei

The women's singles tournament of the 2022 BWF World Championships took place from 22 to 28 August 2022 at the Tokyo Metropolitan Gymnasium in Tokyo.

Defending champion Akane Yamaguchi defeated Chen Yu Fei, 21-12, 10-21, 21-14 to retain her title.

== Seeds ==
The seeding list was based on the World Rankings of 9 August 2022.

1. (Japan) Akane Yamaguchi (champion)
2. (Chinese Taipei) Tai Tzu-ying (semi-finals)
3. (South Korea) An Se-young (semi-finals)
4. (China) Chen Yufei (final)
5. (Spain) Carolina Marín (quarter-finals)
6. (Japan) Nozomi Okuhara (withdrew)
7. (India) P. V. Sindhu (withdrew)
8. (Thailand) Ratchanok Intanon (third round)

9. (China) He Bingjiao (third round)
10. (Thailand) Pornpawee Chochuwong (third round)
11. (China) Wang Zhiyi (third round)
12. (Thailand) Busanan Ongbamrungphan (quarter-finals)
13. (Canada) Michelle Li (quarter-finals)
14. (Japan) Sayaka Takahashi (third round)
15. (Denmark) Mia Blichfeldt (second round)
16. (United States) Beiwen Zhang (third round)

Click on the seed number of a player to go to their draw section.

== Draw ==
=== Finals ===
Semi-finals
1	(Japan) Akane Yamaguchi	21	21
3	(South Korea) An Se-young	19	12
4	(China) Chen Yufei	15	21	21
2	(Chinese Taipei) Tai Tzu-ying	21	14	18

Final
1	(Japan) Akane Yamaguchi	21	10	21
4	(China) Chen Yufei	12	21	14

=== Top half ===
==== Section 1 ====
First Round
(Scotland) K Gilmour	22	7
(Indonesia) G M Tunjung	24	21
(South Korea) Kim G-e	21	21
(Denmark) L Kjærsfeldt	13	7
(Myanmar) Thet Htar T	7	21	19
(Canada) WY Zhang	21	11	21
(Israel) K Polikarpova	5	13
(United States) I Wang	21	21

Second Round
1	(Japan) A Yamaguchi	21	21
(Indonesia) G M Tunjung	12	15
14	(Japan) S Takahashi	9	21	21
(South Korea) Kim G-e	21	16	13
5	(Spain) C Marín	21	21
(Canada) WY Zhang	16	14
9	(China) He BJ	21	21
(United States) I Wang	13	7

Third Round
1	(Japan) A Yamaguchi	21	21
14	(Japan) S Takahashi	18	7
5	(Spain) C Marín	16	21	22
9	(China) He BJ	21	15	20

Quarter-finals
1	(Japan) A Yamaguchi	21	21
5	(Spain) C Marín	17	17

==== Section 2 ====
First Round
(Japan) A Ohori	21	19	11
(Vietnam) Nguyễn T L	10	21	21
(Estonia) K Kuuba	18	16
(France) L Huet	21	21
(China) Han Y	21	21
(France) Qi XF	14	15
(India) M Bansod	14	12
(Denmark) L Christophersen	21	21

Second Round
3	(South Korea) An S-y	21	21
(Vietnam) Nguyễn T L	18	10
16	(United States) BW Zhang	21	21
(France) L Huet	8	14
7	(India) P. V. Sindhu
(China) Han Y	w	/	o
11	(China) Wang ZY	21	21
(Denmark) L Christophersen	15	14

Third Round
3	(South Korea) An S-y	21	21
16	(United States) BW Zhang	12	10
(China) Han Y	21	21
11	(China) Wang ZY	11	13

Quarter-finals
3	(South Korea) An S-y	21	15	22
(China) Han Y	14	21	20

=== Bottom half ===
==== Section 3 ====
First Round
(Belgium) L Tan	14	20
(Hong Kong) Yip P Y	21	22
(Thailand) P Chaiwan	21	21
(Chinese Taipei) Pai Y-p	18	13
(Singapore) Yeo J M
(South Korea) Sim Y-j	w	/	o
(Malaysia) S Cheah S Y	21	21
(Indonesia) P K Wardani	19	18

Second Round
(Hong Kong) Yip P Y	19	13
13	(Canada) M Li	21	21
(Thailand) P Chaiwan	17	17
8	(Thailand) R Intanon	21	21
(South Korea) Sim Y-j	21	16	10
10	(Thailand) P Chochuwong	18	21	21
(Malaysia) S Cheah S Y	17	15
4	(China) Chen YF	21	21

Third Round
13	(Canada) M Li	25	16	21
8	(Thailand) R Intanon	23	21	13
10	(Thailand) P Chochuwong	17	21	10
4	(China) Chen YF	21	17	21

Quarter-finals
13	(Canada) M Li	18	17
4	(China) Chen YF	21	21

==== Section 4 ====
First Round
(Egypt) D Hany	10	10
(Germany) Y Li	21	21
(India) S Nehwal	21	21
(Hong Kong) Cheung N Y	19	9
(Vietnam) Vũ T T	21	21
(Malaysia) Kisona S	10	17
(Slovakia) M Repiská	21	12	21
(Ukraine) M Ulitina	16	21	17

Second Round
(Germany) Y Li	22	16	20
12	(Thailand) B Ongbamrungphan	20	21	22
(India) S Nehwal	w	/	o
6	(Japan) N Okuhara
(Vietnam) Vũ T T	21	16	21
15	(Denmark) M Blichfeldt	18	21	18
(Slovakia) M Repiská	9	12
2	(Chinese Taipei) Tai T-y	21	21

Third Round
12	(Thailand) B Ongbamrungphan	21	16	21
(India) S Nehwal	17	21	13
(Vietnam) Vũ T T	15	10
2	(Chinese Taipei) Tai T-y	21	21

Quarter-finals
12	(Thailand) B Ongbamrungphan	16	9
2	(Chinese Taipei) Tai T-y	21	21
