= Zhang Yiman =

Chinese badminton player (born 1997)

Zhang Yiman 张艺曼
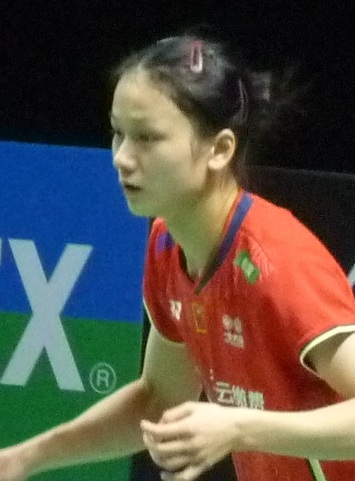
- Zhang at the 2022 German Open

Personal information
- Born: 15 January 1997 (age 29) Hengyang, Hunan, China

Sport
- Country: China
- Sport: Badminton
- Handedness: Right
- Coached by: Luo Yigang
- Retired: 18 December 2024

Women's singles
- Highest ranking: 13 (19 September 2023)
- BWF profile
Medal record
Women's badminton
Representing China
World Championships
Bronze medal – third place	2021 Huelva	Women's singles
Uber Cup
Silver medal – second place	2022 Bangkok	Women's team
World University Games
Silver medal – second place	2021 Chengdu	Mixed team
Bronze medal – third place	2021 Chengdu	Women's singles

Zhang Yiman (Chinese: 张艺曼; pinyin: Zhāng Yìmàn, born 15 January 1997) is a Chinese badminton player. She won her first World Tour title at the 2019 Vietnam Open. She also won a bronze medal at the 2021 World Championships in the women's singles category.

In December 2024, Zhang announced her retirement from the national team on social media.

== Career ==
=== Early career ===
In December 2014, Zhang was transferred from the Jiangxi Provincial badminton team to the Bayi badminton team, and in January 2015, she entered the national team. In November 2017, she reached the semi-finals in the Macau Open. She fought hard for three games and lost 22–20, 16–21, 11–21.

=== 2018–2019 ===
Zhang reached her first ever final in the BWF World Tour at the New Zealand Open, where she finished runner-up to Sayaka Takahashi. She also became a runner-up in the Lingshui China Masters and Belarus International. Shi finally managed to win her first ever World Tour title in the Vietnam Open.

=== 2021 ===
In 2021, Zhang participated in the 2021 BWF World Championships in the women's singles category. The unseeded Zhang defeated Hong Kong's Cheung Ngan Yi in the first round before receiving a walkover to the third round, where she defeated the sixteenth seed Kim Ga-eun of South Korea in straight games. Then in the quarter-finals, she shocked the seventh seed and former world champion Ratchanok Intanon in a hard-fought three-game match. This was the biggest win in her career. Although she lost to Japan's Akane Yamaguchi in straight games in the semi-final, she won a bronze medal, which was her first ever medal from a major tournament.

=== 2022 ===
Zhang reached the final at the 2022 Hylo Open, but lost to compatriot Han Yue in straight games.

=== 2023 ===
Zhang won her first BWF World Tour title at the 2023 Thailand Masters, beating compatriot Han Yue in three games. She also finished runner-up in the Hong Kong Open.

=== 2024–2025 ===
Zhang announced her retirement from the national team on social media in December 2024.

In 2025, Zhang ended a 26-month international title drought by winning the Ruichang China Masters.

== Achievements ==
=== BWF World Championships ===
Women's singles
Year	Venue	Opponent	Score	Result	Ref.
2021	Palacio de los Deportes Carolina Marín; Huelva, Spain	(Japan) Akane Yamaguchi	19–21, 19–21	Bronze	

=== World University Games ===
Women's singles
Year	Venue	Opponent	Score	Result	Ref.
2021	Shuangliu Sports Centre Gymnasium; Chengdu, China	(South Korea) Kim Ga-ram	13–21, 18–21	Bronze	

=== BWF World Tour (3 titles, 4 runners-up) ===
The BWF World Tour, which was announced on 19 March 2017 and implemented in 2018, is a series of elite badminton tournaments sanctioned by the Badminton World Federation (BWF). The BWF World Tour is divided into levels of World Tour Finals, Super 1000, Super 750, Super 500, Super 300, and the BWF Tour Super 100.

Women's singles
Year	Tournament	Level	Opponent	Score	Result	Ref.
2018	New Zealand Open	Super 300	(Japan) Sayaka Takahashi	13–21, 14–21	(silver) Runner-up	
2019	Lingshui China Masters	Super 100	(South Korea) Kim Ga-eun	20–22, 21–14, 17–21	(silver) Runner-up	
2019	Vietnam Open	Super 100	(Japan) Asuka Takahashi	21–18, 21–11	(gold) Winner	
2022	Hylo Open	Super 300	(China) Han Yue	18–21, 16–21	(silver) Runner-up	
2023	Thailand Masters	Super 300	(China) Han Yue	15–21, 21–13, 21–18	(gold) Winner	
2023	Hong Kong Open	Super 500	(Japan) Akane Yamaguchi	18–21, 15–21	(silver) Runner-up	
2025	Ruichang China Masters	Super 100	(China) Han Qianxi	21–13, 21–14	(gold) Winner	

=== BWF International Challenge/Series (1 runner-up) ===
Women's singles
Year	Tournament	Opponent	Score	Result	Ref.
2019	Belarus International	(China) Wang Zhiyi	21–18, 9–21, 8–21	(silver) Runner-up	

BWF International Challenge tournament
BWF International Series tournament

== Record against selected opponents ==
Record against Year-end Finals finalists, World Championships semi-finalists, and Olympic quarter-finalists. Accurate as of 6 November 2022.

Players	Matches	Results		Difference
Players	Matches	Won	Lost	Difference
(China) Chen Yufei	6	0	6	–6
(China) He Bingjiao	2	0	2	–2
(China) Li Xuerui	1	0	1	–1
(Chinese Taipei) Tai Tzu-ying	1	0	1	–1
(Hong Kong) Yip Pui Yin	1	1	0	+1
(India) Saina Nehwal	2	2	0	+2
(India) P. V. Sindhu	2	1	1	0

Players	Matches	Results		Difference
Players	Matches	Won	Lost	Difference
(Japan) Nozomi Okuhara	1	1	0	+1
(Japan) Akane Yamaguchi	1	0	1	–1
(South Korea) An Se-young	1	0	1	–1
(South Korea) Sung Ji-hyun	1	0	1	–1
(Spain) Carolina Marín	5	1	4	–3
(Thailand) Ratchanok Intanon	3	1	2	–1
