= Thet Htar Thuzar =

Burmese badminton player (born 1999)

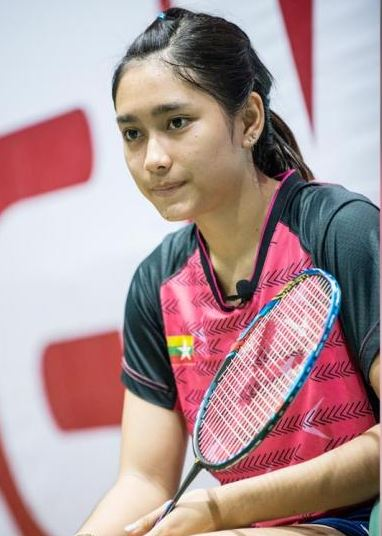

Personal information
- Born: Thet Htar Thuzar; 15 March 1999 (age 27) Yangon, Myanmar
- Height: 1.58 m (5 ft 2 in)
- Weight: 58 kg (128 lb)

Sport
- Country: Myanmar
- Sport: Badminton
- Handedness: Right

Women's singles
- Highest ranking: 40 (24 October 2023)
- BWF profile
Medal record
Women's badminton
Representing Myanmar
SEA Games
Silver medal – second place	2023 Cambodia	Mixed team

Thet Htar Thuzar (Burmese: သက်ထားသူဇာ; born 15 March 1999) is a Burmese badminton player. She participated at the 2013 SEA Games in her home country Myanmar. She won her first International title at the Egypt International 2018. As of 2019 she had reached eight finals, most of them in the African Badminton Circuit, winning six events (in Uganda, Kenya, Mauritius, Benin, Ivory Coast and again in Egypt).

== Early life ==
Thet Htar was born in 1999 in Yangon; to parents who are both badminton players which inspired her to make a career in badminton. She first picked up a badminton racket when she was seven years old. Thet Htar was briefly raised in Thailand, as her father was serving as a coach there. She juggled sports and studies in Thailand and won third prize in her first competition at the age of seven, and later she returned to Myanmar with her family in 2010. Shortly after her return to Myanmar, she was selected to represent the Yangon Region in the Regions and States Tournament and won the best player award. Then, she started competing in open tournaments and was enlisted in the National team.

She was only 11 when she made her international debut at the 2011 Southeast Asian Games. Before the 2020 Summer Olympics in Tokyo, she took part in the Asia Olympic Project, which was a year-end regional training programme held in Kuala Lumpur, Malaysia. She also participated for Myanmar at the 2013, 2017, 2019, and at the 2023 Games. For the 2025 edition in Thailand, she was chosen as the Burmese contingent flag bearer at the opening ceremony alongside sepak takraw coach, Aung Cho Myint.

== Career ==
Thet Htar Thuzar reached three semi-finals in 2019. At the India International Challenge losing a close contested match against Thai player Benyapa Aimsaard 20–22, 17–21, and the semi-finals at the Maldives International, where she lost after one hour and two minutes against Vũ Thị Trang of Vietnam 14–21, 21–15, 16–21. And also losing the semi-final at her home event, the Myanmar International to Indonesian Maharani Sekar Batari 15–21, 17–21. She participated at the 2019 Badminton Asia Championships in Wuhan, China. She lost the quarter-finals of the 2019 Bulgarian Open to eventual winner Neslihan Yiğit of Turkey in a 57 minutes marathon match 12–21, 21–19, 18–21.

=== Olympian ===
Thet Htar Thuzar qualified and participated at the 2020 Tokyo Olympics in July 2021. She lost both her Group M women's singles matches against 14th seed Gregoria Mariska Tunjung of Indonesia (11–21, 8–21) and Lianne Tan of Belgium (6–21, 8–21).

=== World Championship participation ===
After the Olympics she played her last match during the round of 128 of the 2021 BWF World Championships losing 15–21, 16–21 to Chinese Taipei player Pai Yu-po.

== Achievements ==
=== BWF International Challenge/Series (9 titles, 4 runners-up) ===
Women's singles
Year	Tournament	Opponent	Score	Result
2018	Egypt International	(Belarus) Alesia Zaitsava	Walkover	(gold) Winner
2018	Nepal International	(Thailand) Chananchida Jucharoen	18–21, 21–10, 17–21	(silver) Runner-up
2019	Uganda International	(Jordan) Domou Amro	21–14, 21–12	(gold) Winner
2019	Kenya International	(Jordan) Domou Amro	21–10, 21–10	(gold) Winner
2019	Mauritius International	(Finland) Airi Mikkelä	21–10, 21–19	(gold) Winner
2019	Benin International	(Peru) Daniela Macías	17–21, 21–18, 21–14	(gold) Winner
2019	Côte d'Ivoire International	(India) Sri Krishna Priya Kudaravalli	21–17, 21–13	(gold) Winner
2019	Hellas Open	(Malaysia) Kisona Selvaduray	14–21, 9–21	(silver) Runner-up
2019	Maldives Future Series	(India) Malvika Bansod	13–21, 11–21	(silver) Runner-up
2019	Egypt International	(Wales) Jordan Hart	21–6, 12–1 Retired	(gold) Winner
2020	Uganda International	(India) Aakarshi Kashyap	21–14, 16–21, 21–18	(gold) Winner
2026	Bonn International	(Chinese Taipei) Liao Jui-chi	9–21, 21–18, 10–21	(silver) Runner-up
2026	Zambia International	(United Arab Emirates) Nurani Ratu Azzahra	22–20, 21–7	(gold) Winner

BWF International Challenge tournament
BWF International Series tournament
BWF Future Series tournament
