= Nguyễn Thùy Linh =

Vietnamese badminton player (born 1997)

Personal information
- Born: 20 November 1997 (age 29) Phú Thọ, Vietnam
- Years active: 2015–present
- Height: 1.63 m (5 ft 4 in)
- Weight: 53 kg (117 lb)

Sport
- Country: Vietnam
- Sport: Badminton
- Handedness: Right

Women's singles
- Career record: 186 wins, 103 losses
- Highest ranking: 17 (16 September 2025)
- Current ranking: 29 (10 November 2026)
- BWF profile
Medal record
Women's badminton
Representing Vietnam
SEA Games
| Bronze medal – third place | 2021 Vietnam | Women's team |

Nguyễn Thùy Linh (born 20 November 1997) is a Vietnamese badminton player. She started her career by leaving her hometown in Phú Thọ Province, train at the Hanoi badminton club, and later joined Da Nang club. She represented her country at the 2015 SEA Games when she was 18 years old.

She also competed for Vietnam at the 2020 Summer Olympics and the 2024 Summer Olympics.

== Career ==
=== 2016 ===
She won her first international title at the 2016 Nepal International, and at the same year, she entered the top 100 in the women's singles world ranking.

=== 2022 ===
She won a bronze medal in the 2021 SEA Games mixed team event. She also competed in the 2022 BWF World Championships and made an upset when she won against Aya Ohori in the first round. She lost the second round to eventual bronze medalist An Se-young.

On September, she won the Belgian International tournament, defeating Hirari Mizui in the final.

== Achievements ==
=== BWF World Tour (3 titles, 6 runners-up) ===
The BWF World Tour, which was announced on 19 March 2017 and implemented in 2018, is a series of elite badminton tournaments sanctioned by the Badminton World Federation (BWF). The BWF World Tour is divided into levels of World Tour Finals, Super 1000, Super 750, Super 500, Super 300 (part of the HSBC World Tour), and the BWF Tour Super 100.

Women's singles
| Year | Tournament | Level | Opponent | Score | Result |
|---|---|---|---|---|---|
| 2022 | Vietnam Open | Super 100 | (Malaysia) Goh Jin Wei | 21–15, 21–13 | (gold) Winner |
| 2023 | Vietnam Open | Super 100 | (Japan) Akari Kurihara | 21–14, 11–21, 21–19 | (gold) Winner |
| 2024 | German Open | Super 300 | (Denmark) Mia Blichfeldt | 11–21, 9–21 | (silver) Runner-up |
| 2024 | Vietnam Open | Super 100 | (Japan) Kaoru Sugiyama | 21–15, 22–20 | (gold) Winner |
| 2025 | German Open | Super 300 | (Singapore) Yeo Jia Min | 16–21, 17–21 | (silver) Runner-up |
| 2025 | Canada Open | Super 300 | (Japan) Manami Suizu | 12–21, 14–21 | (silver) Runner-up |
| 2025 | Vietnam Open | Super 100 | (China) Cai Yanyan | 17–21, 21–23 | (silver) Runner-up |
| 2025 | Korea Masters | Super 300 | (Chinese Taipei) Chiu Pin-chian | 16–21, 15–21 | (silver) Runner-up |
| 2026 | Taipei Open | Super 300 | (India) Tanvi Sharma | 16–21, 16–21 | (silver) Runner-up |

=== BWF International Challenge/Series (9 titles, 6 runners-up) ===
Women's singles
| Year | Tournament | Opponent | Score | Result |
|---|---|---|---|---|
| 2016 | Bangladesh International | (Vietnam) Vũ Thị Trang | 18–21, 13–21 | (silver) Runner-up |
| 2016 | Nepal International | (Indonesia) Devi Yunita Indah Sari | 21–17, 21–16 | (gold) Winner |
| 2017 | Mongolia International | (South Korea) Han So-yeon | 21–18, 21–9 | (gold) Winner |
| 2017 | Lao International | (Thailand) Benyapa Aimsaard | 21–12, 16–21, 21–11 | (gold) Winner |
| 2017 | Italian International | (Denmark) Line Christophersen | 24–22, 16–21, 23–21 | (gold) Winner |
| 2018 | Bangladesh International | (Indonesia) Putri Kusuma Wardani | 21–18, 21–19 | (gold) Winner |
| 2019 | Hungarian International | (Turkey) Neslihan Yiğit | 16–21, 21–12, 18–21 | (silver) Runner-up |
| 2019 | Norwegian International | (Chinese Taipei) Sung Shuo-yun | 16–21, 18–21 | (silver) Runner-up |
| 2019 | Bangladesh International | (United States) Crystal Pan | 21–8, 21–16 | (gold) Winner |
| 2020 | Austrian Open | (Japan) Yukino Nakai | 13–21, 18–21 | (silver) Runner-up |
| 2022 | Belgian International | (Japan) Hirari Mizui | 21–19, 21–16 | (gold) Winner |
| 2022 | Bendigo International | (Chinese Taipei) Sung Shuo-yun | 19–21, 15–21 | (silver) Runner-up |
| 2022 | Vietnam International Series | (Vietnam) Vũ Thị Trang | 21–15, 21–9 | (gold) Winner |
| 2023 | Thailand International | (Japan) Asuka Takahashi | 17–21, 17–21 | (silver) Runner-up |
| 2023 | Vietnam International | (Japan) Asuka Takahashi | 21–7, 15–21, 21–12 | (gold) Winner |

BWF International Challenge tournament
BWF International Series tournament
BWF Future Series tournament
