= Pai Yu-po =

Taiwanese badminton player (born 1991)

Pai Yu-po 白馭珀
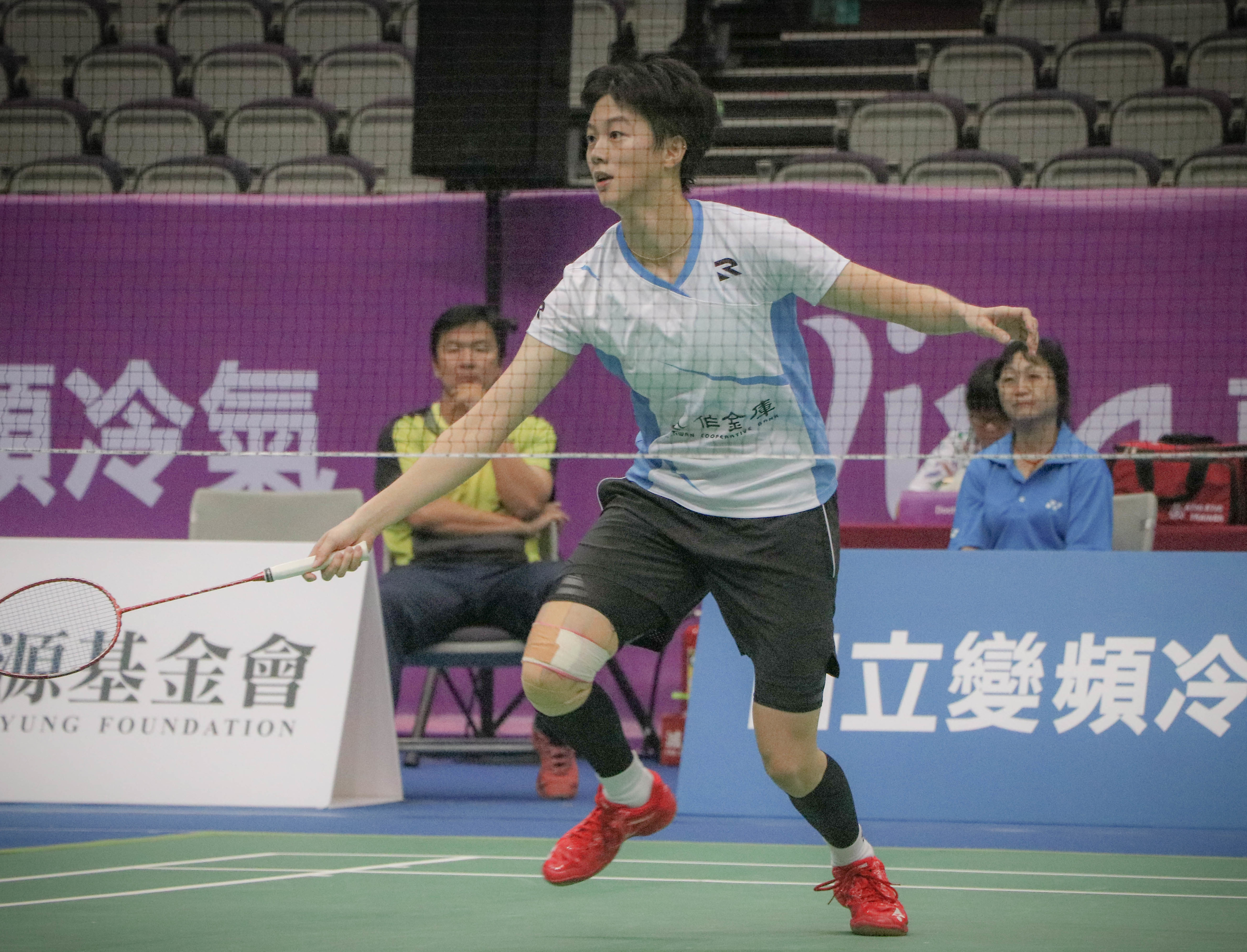

Personal information
- Born: 18 April 1991 (age 35) Taipei, Taiwan
- Height: 1.73 m (5 ft 8 in)
- Weight: 64 kg (141 lb)

Sport
- Country: Republic of China (Taiwan)
- Sport: Badminton
- Handedness: Right

Women's singles & doubles
- Highest ranking: 20 (WS, 5 April 2018); 32 (WD, 22 October 2015); 170 (XD, 8 December 2011)
- Current ranking: 58 (WS, 16 June 2026)
- BWF profile

Pai Yu-po (Chinese: 白馭珀; born 18 April 1991) is a Taiwanese badminton player. She started playing badminton at age 9, and debuted at the 2007 Vietnam International. She joined the Chinese Taipei national badminton team in 2014, and represented her country during the 2014 Incheon Asian Games.

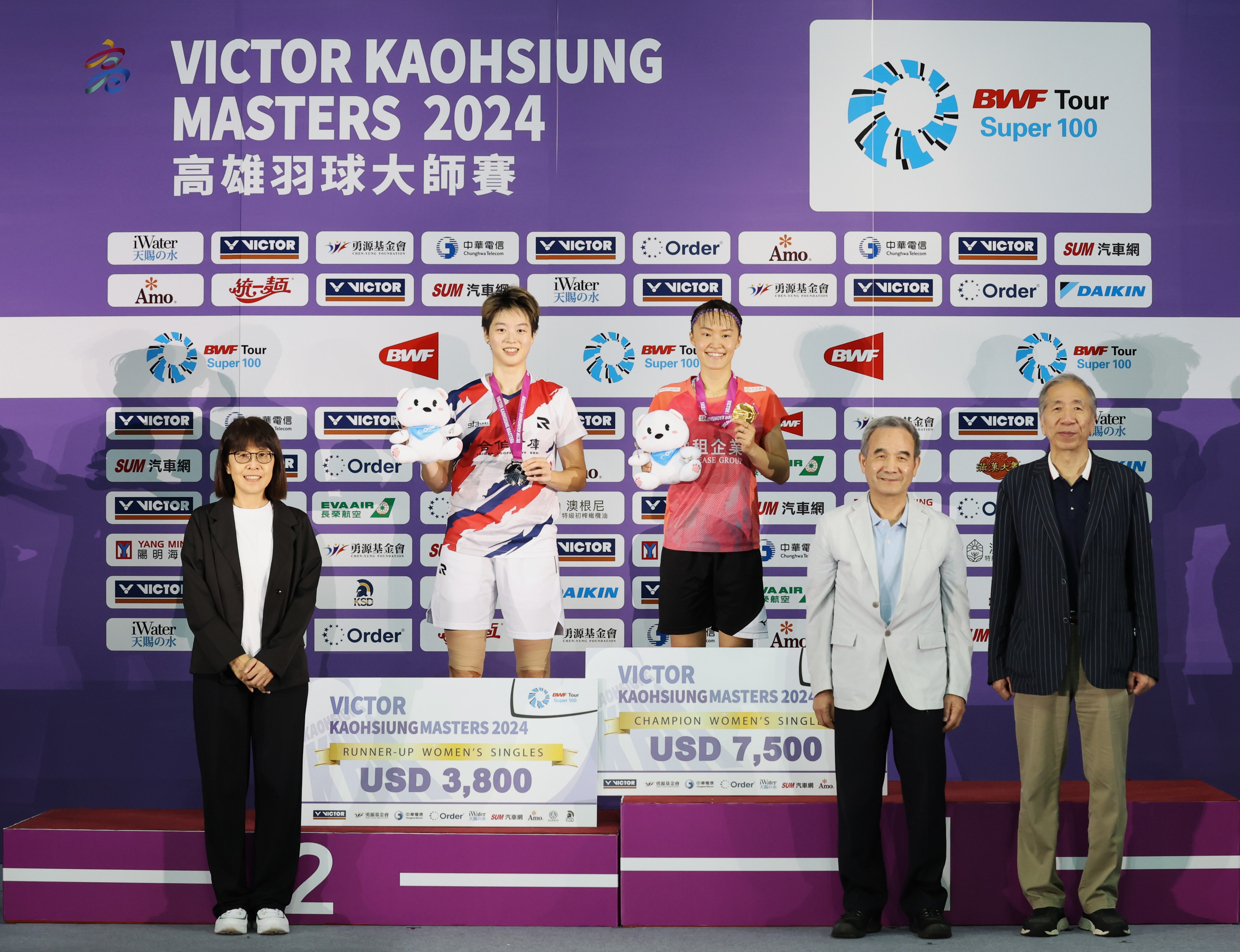
Pai in the women's singles podium after finished runner-up in the 2024 Kaohsiung Masters.

== Achievements ==
=== BWF World Tour (1 title, 1 runner-up) ===
The BWF World Tour, which was announced on 19 March 2017 and implemented in 2018, is a series of elite badminton tournaments sanctioned by the Badminton World Federation (BWF). The BWF World Tour is divided into levels of World Tour Finals, Super 1000, Super 750, Super 500, Super 300 (part of the HSBC World Tour), and the BWF Tour Super 100.

Women's singles
| Year | Tournament | Level | Opponent | Score | Result |
|---|---|---|---|---|---|
| 2019 | Russian Open | Super 100 | (Scotland) Kirsty Gilmour | 9–21, 21–19, 21–19 | (gold) Winner |
| 2024 | Kaohsiung Masters | Super 100 | (Chinese Taipei) Hsu Wen-chi | 20–22, 18–21 | (silver) Runner-up |

=== BWF Grand Prix ===
The BWF Grand Prix had two levels, the Grand Prix and Grand Prix Gold. It was a series of badminton tournaments sanctioned by the Badminton World Federation (BWF) and played between 2007 and 2017.

Women's singles
| Year | Tournament | Opponent | Score | Result |
|---|---|---|---|---|
| 2014 | Canada Open | (Canada) Michelle Li | 16–21, 21–23 | (silver) Runner-up |
| 2014 | Dutch Open | (United States) Beiwen Zhang | 9–11, 7–11, 8–11 | (silver) Runner-up |
| 2015 | U.S. Grand Prix | (Scotland) Kirsty Gilmour | 18–21, 21–15, 21–15 | (gold) Winner |
| 2017 | Macau Open | (China) Cai Yanyan | 15–21, 21–17, 16–21 | (silver) Runner-up |

BWF Grand Prix Gold tournament
BWF Grand Prix tournament

=== BWF International Challenge/Series ===
Women's singles
| Year | Tournament | Opponent | Score | Result |
|---|---|---|---|---|
| 2010 | Kaohsiung International | (Chinese Taipei) Chiang Pei-hsin | 21–19, 21–17 | (gold) Winner |
| 2013 | Malaysia International | (Chinese Taipei) Hsu Ya-ching | 6–21, 13–21 | (silver) Runner-up |
| 2015 | USA International | (United States) Beiwen Zhang | 14–21, 21–13, 19–21 | (silver) Runner-up |

Mixed doubles
| Year | Tournament | Partner | Opponent | Score | Result |
|---|---|---|---|---|---|
| 2013 | Polish International | (Chinese Taipei) Lu Ching-yao | (Chinese Taipei) Lin Chia-hsuan (Chinese Taipei) Hsu Ya-ching | 21–12, 16–21, 18–21 | (silver) Runner-up |

BWF International Challenge tournament
BWF International Series tournament
