= 2018 BWF World Championships – Women's singles =

Badminton championships

Women's singles at the BWF World Championships
- Venue: Nanjing Youth Olympic Sports Park Indoor Arena
- Location: Nanjing, China
- Dates: 30 July – 5 August

Medalists
| gold medal | Carolina Marín | Spain |
| silver medal | P. V. Sindhu | India |
| bronze medal | He Bingjiao | China |
| bronze medal | Akane Yamaguchi | Japan |

The women's singles tournament of the 2018 BWF World Championships (World Badminton Championships) took place from 30 July to 5 August.

== Seeds ==
The seeding list is based on the World Rankings from 12 July 2018.

1. (Chinese Taipei) Tai Tzu-ying (quarterfinals)
2. (Japan) Akane Yamaguchi (semifinals)
3. (India) P. V. Sindhu (final)
4. (Thailand) Ratchanok Intanon (third round)
5. (China) Chen Yufei (quarterfinals)
6. (China) He Bingjiao (semifinals)
7. (Spain) Carolina Marín (champion)
8. (Japan) Nozomi Okuhara (quarterfinals)

9. (South Korea) Sung Ji-hyun (third round)
10. (India) Saina Nehwal (quarterfinals)
11. (Thailand) Nitchaon Jindapol (third round)
12. (United States) Zhang Beiwen (third round)
13. (Canada) Michelle Li (second round)
14. (Japan) Aya Ohori (second round)
15. (Japan) Sayaka Sato (third round)
16. (Hong Kong) Cheung Ngan Yi (second round)

Click on the seed number of a player to go to their draw section.

== Draw ==
=== Finals ===
Semifinals
6 | (China) He Bingjiao | 21 | 16 | 13
7 | (Spain) Carolina Marín | 13 | 21 | 21
3 | (India) P. V. Sindhu | 21 | 24
2 | (Japan) Akane Yamaguchi | 16 | 22

Final
7 | (Spain) Carolina Marín | 21 | 21
3 | (India) P. V. Sindhu | 19 | 10

=== Top half ===
==== Section 1 ====
First round
(Mauritius) K Foo Kune | 13 | 17
(Australia) Chen H-y | 21 | 21
(Spain) B Corrales | 17 | 19
(England) C Birch | 21 | 21
(Thailand) P Chochuwong
(Hong Kong) Yip P Y | w | / | o
(Bulgaria) M Mitsova | 9 | 14
(Vietnam) Nguyễn T L | 21 | 21

Second round
1 | (Chinese Taipei) Tai T-y | 21 | 21
(Australia) Chen H-y | 10 | 16
12 | (United States) Zhang BW | 13 | 21 | 21
(England) C Birch | 21 | 18 | 15
6 | (China) He BJ | 21 | 21
(Hong Kong) Yip P Y | 11 | 17
13 | (Canada) M Li | 23 | 12 | 21
(Vietnam) Nguyễn T L | 21 | 21 | 23

Third round
1 | (Chinese Taipei) Tai T-y | 21 | 21
12 | (United States) Zhang BW | 19 | 14
6 | (China) He BJ | 21 | 21
(Vietnam) Nguyễn T L | 14 | 11

Quarterfinals
1 | (Chinese Taipei) Tai T-y | 18 | 21 | 13
6 | (China) He BJ | 21 | 7 | 21

==== Section 2 ====
First round
(Russia) N Perminova | 13 | 9
(Denmark) M Blichfeldt | 21 | 21
(Switzerland) S Jaquet
(Turkey) A Demirbağ | w | / | o
(Thailand) B Ongbamrungphan | 21 | 21
(United States) J Hsu | 10 | 11
(Malaysia) S Cheah S Y | 21 | 21
(Netherlands) G Mahulette | 13 | 12

Second round
4 | (Thailand) R Intanon | 16 | 22 | 21
(Denmark) M Blichfeldt | 21 | 20 | 10
10 | (India) S Nehwal | 21 | 21
(Turkey) A Demirbağ | 17 | 8
7 | (Spain) C Marín | 21 | 21
(Thailand) B Ongbamrungphan | 9 | 8
15 | (Japan) S Sato | 21 | 21
(Malaysia) S Cheah S Y | 15 | 11

Third round
4 | (Thailand) R Intanon | 16 | 19
10 | (India) S Nehwal | 21 | 21
7 | (Spain) C Marín | 21 | 21
15 | (Japan) S Sato | 7 | 13

Quarterfinals
10 | (India) S Nehwal | 6 | 11
7 | (Spain) C Marín | 21 | 21

=== Bottom half ===
==== Section 3 ====
First round
(Chinese Taipei) Pai Y-p | 8 | 15
(Malaysia) Goh J W | 21 | 21
(Slovakia) M Repiská | 12 | 18
(Canada) R Honderich | 21 | 21
(Vietnam) Vũ T T | 21 | 21
(Turkey) N Yiğit | 19 | 17
(Indonesia) Fitriani | 21 | 19 | 21
(Bulgaria) L Zetchiri | 10 | 21 | 13

Second round
(Malaysia) Goh J W | 21 | 22
14 | (Japan) A Ohori | 18 | 20
(Canada) R Honderich | 11 | 9
8 | (Japan) N Okuhara | 21 | 21
(Vietnam) Vũ T T | 10 | 11
9 | (South Korea) Sung J-h | 21 | 21
(Indonesia) Fitriani | 14 | 9
3 | (India) P. V. Sindhu | 21 | 21

Third round
(Malaysia) Goh J W | 21 | 13
8 | (Japan) N Okuhara | 23 | 21
9 | (South Korea) Sung J-h | 10 | 18
3 | (India) P. V. Sindhu | 21 | 21

Quarterfinals
8 | (Japan) N Okuhara | 17 | 19
3 | (India) P. V. Sindhu | 21 | 21

==== Section 4 ====
First round
(Denmark) L Kjærsfeldt | 10 | 21 | 13
(China) Chen XX | 21 | 17 | 21
(Scotland) K Gilmour | 18 | 21 | 14
(Indonesia) G M Tunjung | 21 | 18 | 21
(Netherlands) S de Visch Eijbergen | 21 | 21
(Ukraine) M Ulitina | 15 | 15
(Germany) F Deprez | 21 | 21
(Russia) E Kosetskaya | 19 | 16

Second round
(China) Chen XX | 21 | 21
16 | (Hong Kong) Cheung N Y | 19 | 14
(Indonesia) G M Tunjung | 17 | 20
5 | (China) Chen YF | 21 | 22
(Netherlands) S de Visch Eijbergen | 11 | 11
11 | (Thailand) N Jindapol | 21 | 21
(Germany) F Deprez | 17 | 10
2 | (Japan) A Yamaguchi | 21 | 21

Third round
(China) Chen XX | 11 | 21 | 12
5 | (China) Chen YF | 21 | 18 | 21
11 | (Thailand) N Jindapol | 12 | 12
2 | (Japan) A Yamaguchi | 21 | 21

Quarterfinals
5 | (China) Chen YF | 13 | 21 | 16
2 | (Japan) A Yamaguchi | 21 | 17 | 21
