= 2019 Fuzhou China Open =

2019 badminton tournament

Tournament details
- Dates: 5–10 November
- Level: Super 750
- Total prize money: US$700,000
- Venue: Haixia Olympic Sports Center
- Location: Fuzhou, Fujian, China

Champions
- Men's singles: (Japan) Kento Momota
- Women's singles: (China) Chen Yufei
- Men's doubles: (Indonesia) Marcus Fernaldi Gideon (Indonesia) Kevin Sanjaya Sukamuljo
- Women's doubles: (Japan) Yuki Fukushima (Japan) Sayaka Hirota
- Mixed doubles: (China) Wang Yilü (China) Huang Dongping

The 2019 Fuzhou China Open was a badminton tournament which took place at Haixia Olympics Sports Center in Fuzhou, Fujian, China, from 5 to 10 November 2019 and had a total prize of $700,000.

== Tournament ==
The 2019 Fuzhou China Open was the twenty-third tournament of the 2019 BWF World Tour and also part of the Fuzhou China Open championships, which has been held since 2005. This tournament was organized by Chinese Badminton Association and sanctioned by the BWF.

=== Venue ===
This international tournament was held at Haixia Olympic Sports Center in Fuzhou, Fujian, China.

=== Point distribution ===
Below is the point distribution table for each phase of the tournament based on the BWF points system for the BWF World Tour Super 750 event.

Winner	Runner-up	3/4	5/8	9/16	17/32
11,000	9,350	7,700	6,050	4,320	2,660

=== Prize money ===
The total prize money for this tournament was US$700,000. Distribution of prize money was in accordance with BWF regulations.

Event	Winner	Finals	Semi-finals	Quarter-finals	Last 16	Last 32
Singles	$49,000	$23,800	$9,800	$3,850	$2,100	$700
Doubles	$51,800	$24,500	$9,800	$4,375	$2,275	$700

== Men's singles ==
=== Seeds ===
1. (Japan) Kento Momota (champion)
2. (Chinese Taipei) Chou Tien-chen (final)
3. (China) Shi Yuqi (second round)
4. (Denmark) Anders Antonsen (semi-finals)
5. (China) Chen Long (second round)
6. (Indonesia) Jonatan Christie (quarter-finals)
7. (Denmark) Viktor Axelsen (quarter-finals)
8. (Indonesia) Anthony Sinisuka Ginting (first round)

=== Finals ===
Semi-finals
1	(Japan) Kento Momota	21	21
(Denmark) Rasmus Gemke	19	8
4	(Denmark) Anders Antonsen	10	12
2	(Chinese Taipei) Chou Tien-chen	21	21

Final
1	(Japan) Kento Momota	21	17	21
2	(Chinese Taipei) Chou Tien-chen	15	21	18

=== Top half ===
==== Section 1 ====
First Round
1	(Japan) K Momota	21	0
PFR	(Malaysia) Liew D	17	0^{r}
(Malaysia) Lee Z J	19	21	21
(Singapore) Loh K Y	21	18	12
7	(Denmark) V Axelsen	21	21
(Japan) K Tsuneyama	15	19
(India) Parupalli K	21	21
(Thailand) S Thammasin	14	13

Second Round
1	(Japan) K Momota	21	11
(Malaysia) Lee Z J	9	3^{r}
7	(Denmark) V Axelsen	21	21
(India) Parupalli K	13	19

Quarter-finals
1	(Japan) K Momota	21	12	21
7	(Denmark) V Axelsen	18	21	16

==== Section 2 ====
First Round
3	(China) Shi YQ	21	21
(South Korea) Son W-h	17	17
(Denmark) R Gemke	21	21
(India) Prannoy K	17	18
8	(Indonesia) A S Ginting	18	9
(Hong Kong) Ng K L	21	21
(Thailand) K Phetpradab	10	14
(Denmark) J Ø. Jørgensen	21	21

Second Round
3	(China) Shi YQ	10	0^{r}
(Denmark) R Gemke	21	0
(Hong Kong) Ng K L	21	21
(Denmark) J Ø. Jørgensen	17	15

Quarter-finals
(Denmark) R Gemke	13	21	22
(Hong Kong) Ng K L	21	14	20

=== Bottom half ===
==== Section 3 ====
First Round
(India) S Verma	18	18
(Hong Kong) Lee C Y	21	21
(Indonesia) S H Rhustavito	18	17
6	(Indonesia) J Christie	21	21
(Indonesia) T Sugiarto	21	12	10
(India) B. Sai Praneeth	15	21	21
(Thailand) K Wangcharoen	12	7
4	(Denmark) A Antonsen	21	21

Second Round
(Hong Kong) Lee C Y	8	21	14
6	(Indonesia) J Christie	21	12	21
(India) B. Sai Praneeth	20	22	16
4	(Denmark) A Antonsen	22	20	21

Quarter-finals
6	(Indonesia) J Christie	16	11
4	(Denmark) A Antonsen	21	21

==== Section 4 ====
First Round
(China) Lu GZ	21	21
(China) Huang YX	17	18
(China) Lin D	21	12	12
5	(China) Chen L	19	21	21
(Japan) K Nishimoto	14	21	21
(Denmark) H-K Vittinghus	21	13	11
(Chinese Taipei) Wang T-w	19	17
2	(Chinese Taipei) Chou T-c	21	21

Second Round
(China) Lu GZ	21	10	21
5	(China) Chen L	10	21	13
(Japan) K Nishimoto	16	19
2	(Chinese Taipei) Chou T-c	21	21

Quarter-finals
(China) Lu GZ	17	18
2	(Chinese Taipei) Chou T-c	21	21

== Women's singles ==
=== Seeds ===
1. (Chinese Taipei) Tai Tzu-ying (semi-finals)
2. (Japan) Akane Yamaguchi (first round)
3. (China) Chen Yufei (champion)
4. (Japan) Nozomi Okuhara (final)
5. (Thailand) Ratchanok Intanon (quarter-finals)
6. (India) P. V. Sindhu (first round)
7. (China) He Bingjiao (quarter-finals)
8. (India) Saina Nehwal (first round)

=== Finals ===
Semi-finals
1	(Chinese Taipei) Tai Tzu-ying	21	12	6^{r}
4	(Japan) Nozomi Okuhara	19	21	11
3	(China) Chen Yufei	20	21	21
(Canada) Michelle Li	22	8	17

Final
4	(Japan) Nozomi Okuhara	21	12	18
3	(China) Chen Yufei	9	21	21

=== Top half ===
==== Section 1 ====
First Round
1	(Chinese Taipei) Tai T-y	21	13
(Spain) C Marín	16	1^{r}
(United States) Zhang BW	20	21	17
(Indonesia) G M Tunjung	22	19	21
6	(India) P. V. Sindhu	13	21	19
PFR	(Chinese Taipei) Pai Y-p	21	18	21
(South Korea) Kim G-e	5	21	21
(Scotland) K Gilmour	21	12	17

Second Round
1	(Chinese Taipei) Tai T-y	21	21
(Indonesia) G M Tunjung	19	17
PFR	(Chinese Taipei) Pai Y-p	12	14
(South Korea) Kim G-e	21	21

Quarter-finals
1	(Chinese Taipei) Tai T-y	21	11	21
(South Korea) Kim G-e	15	21	13

==== Section 2 ====
First Round
4	(Japan) N Okuhara	21	21
(China) Chen XX	16	6
(Thailand) N Jindapol	21	21
(Indonesia) Fitriani	12	11
7	(China) He BJ	21	21
(Thailand) P Chochuwong	16	16
(Japan) S Takahashi	17	16
(South Korea) An S-y	21	21

Second Round
4	(Japan) N Okuhara	21	21
(Thailand) N Jindapol	10	11
7	(China) He BJ	21	21
(South Korea) An S-y	13	17

Quarter-finals
4	(Japan) N Okuhara	21	21
7	(China) He BJ	12	11

=== Bottom half ===
==== Section 3 ====
First Round
(Singapore) Yeo J M	15	22	12
(Denmark) M Blichfeldt	21	20	21
(South Korea) Sung J-h	15	14
5	(Thailand) R Intanon	21	21
(Japan) A Ohori	15	21	21
(China) Han Y	21	19	7
(Russia) E Kosetskaya	19	12
3	(China) Chen YF	21	21

Second Round
(Denmark) M Blichfeldt	8	21	7
5	(Thailand) R Intanon	21	16	21
(Japan) A Ohori	18	13
3	(China) Chen YF	21	21

Quarter-finals
5	(Thailand) R Intanon	15	13
3	(China) Chen YF	21	21

==== Section 4 ====
First Round
(Thailand) B Ongbamrungphan	21	21
(Denmark) L Kjærsfeldt	8	17
(China) Cai YY	21	21
8	(India) S Nehwal	9	12
(Canada) M Li	21	21
(Hong Kong) Cheung N Y	13	13
(Malaysia) S Cheah S Y	21	21
2	(Japan) A Yamaguchi	19	16

Second Round
(Thailand) B Ongbamrungphan	21	21
(China) Cai YY	11	15
(Canada) M Li	21	21
(Malaysia) S Cheah S Y	14	10

Quarter-finals
(Thailand) B Ongbamrungphan	16	21
(Canada) M Li	21	23

== Men's doubles ==
=== Seeds ===
1. (Indonesia) Marcus Fernaldi Gideon / Kevin Sanjaya Sukamuljo (champions)
2. (Indonesia) Mohammad Ahsan / Hendra Setiawan (quarter-finals)
3. (China) Li Junhui / Liu Yuchen (quarter-finals)
4. (Japan) Takeshi Kamura / Keigo Sonoda (final)
5. (Indonesia) Fajar Alfian / Muhammad Rian Ardianto (second round)
6. (Japan) Hiroyuki Endo / Yuta Watanabe (second round)
7. (China) Han Chengkai / Zhou Haodong (second round)
8. (Denmark) Kim Astrup / Anders Skaarup Rasmussen (first round)

=== Finals ===
Semi-finals
1	(Indonesia) Marcus Fernaldi Gideon (Indonesia) Kevin Sanjaya Sukamuljo	21	22
(India) Satwiksairaj Rankireddy (India) Chirag Shetty	16	20
4	(Japan) Takeshi Kamura (Japan) Keigo Sonoda	21	21
(Malaysia) Aaron Chia (Malaysia) Soh Wooi Yik	13	14

Final
1	(Indonesia) Marcus Fernaldi Gideon (Indonesia) Kevin Sanjaya Sukamuljo	21	21
4	(Japan) Takeshi Kamura (Japan) Keigo Sonoda	17	9

=== Top half ===
==== Section 1 ====
First Round
1	(Indonesia) M F Gideon (Indonesia) K S Sukamuljo	21	21
(Malaysia) Goh V S (Malaysia) Tan W K	15	16
(China) He JT (China) Tan Q	22	13	27
(Russia) V Ivanov (Russia) I Sozonov	20	21	25
7	(China) Han CK (China) Zhou HD	19	21	21
(Japan) T Hoki (Japan) Y Kobayashi	21	16	16
(Germany) M Lamsfuß (Germany) M E Seidel	21	25	21
(Chinese Taipei) Lee J-h (Chinese Taipei) Yang P-hs	19	27	15

Second Round
1	(Indonesia) M F Gideon (Indonesia) K S Sukamuljo	16	21	21
(China) He JT (China) Tan Q	21	11	16
7	(China) Han CK (China) Zhou HD	17	18
(Germany) M Lamsfuß (Germany) M E Seidel	21	21

Quarter-finals
1	(Indonesia) M F Gideon (Indonesia) K S Sukamuljo	21	21
(Germany) M Lamsfuß (Germany) M E Seidel	14	19

==== Section 2 ====
First Round
3	(China) Li JH (China) Liu YC	21	19	21
(South Korea) Choi S-g (South Korea) Seo S-j	19	21	15
(Chinese Taipei) Lu C-y (Chinese Taipei) Yang P-ha	21	21
(Malaysia) Ong Y S (Malaysia) Teo E Y	17	10
6	(Japan) H Endo (Japan) Y Watanabe	24	21
(Indonesia) W Nayaka (Indonesia) A Yusuf	22	13
PFR	(United States) P Chew (United States) R Chew	9	15
(India) S Rankireddy (India) C Shetty	21	21

Second Round
3	(China) Li JH (China) Liu YC	25	21
(Chinese Taipei) Lu C-y (Chinese Taipei) Yang P-ha	23	9
6	(Japan) H Endo (Japan) Y Watanabe	18	23	11
(India) S Rankireddy (India) C Shetty	21	21	21

Quarter-finals
3	(China) Li JH (China) Liu YC	19	15
(India) S Rankireddy (India) C Shetty	21	21

=== Bottom half ===
==== Section 3 ====
First Round
(England) M Ellis (England) C Langridge	21	21
(Netherlands) J Maas (Netherlands) R Tabeling	19	11
(China) Huang KX (China) Liu C	21	10	21
8	(Denmark) K Astrup (Denmark) A S Rasmussen	11	21	10
PFR	(China) Di ZJ (China) Wang C	18	12
(Malaysia) Goh S F (Malaysia) N Izzuddin M R	21	21
(Japan) T Inoue (Japan) Y Kaneko	21	18	14
4	(Japan) T Kamura (Japan) K Sonoda	12	21	21

Second Round
(England) M Ellis (England) C Langridge	21	21
(China) Huang KX (China) Liu C	19	19
(Malaysia) Goh S F (Malaysia) N Izzuddin M R	20	18
4	(Japan) T Kamura (Japan) K Sonoda	22	21

Quarter-finals
(England) M Ellis (England) C Langridge	10	13
4	(Japan) T Kamura (Japan) K Sonoda	21	21

==== Section 4 ====
First Round
(India) M Attri (India) B. S Reddy	21	19
(Malaysia) A Chia (Malaysia) Soh W Y	23	21
(Chinese Taipei) Liao M-c (Chinese Taipei) Su C-h	12	12
5	(Indonesia) F Alfian (Indonesia) M R Ardianto	21	21
(China) Ou XY (China) Zhang N	21	21
PFR	(Chinese Taipei) Lin C-y (Chinese Taipei) Yang M-t	11	15
(Chinese Taipei) Lee Y (Chinese Taipei) Wang C-l	25	24	17
2	(Indonesia) M Ahsan (Indonesia) H Setiawan	27	22	21

Second Round
(Malaysia) A Chia (Malaysia) Soh W Y	13	21	21
5	(Indonesia) F Alfian (Indonesia) M R Ardianto	21	18	16
(China) Ou XY (China) Zhang N	21	18	29
2	(Indonesia) M Ahsan (Indonesia) H Setiawan	11	21	30

Quarter-finals
(Malaysia) A Chia (Malaysia) Soh W Y	21	22
2	(Indonesia) M Ahsan (Indonesia) H Setiawan	13	20

== Women's doubles ==
=== Seeds ===
1. (Japan) Mayu Matsumoto / Wakana Nagahara (semi-finals)
2. (Japan) Yuki Fukushima / Sayaka Hirota (champions)
3. (China) Chen Qingchen / Jia Yifan (semi-finals)
4. (Japan) Misaki Matsutomo / Ayaka Takahashi (second round)
5. (South Korea) Lee So-hee / Shin Seung-chan (final)
6. (Indonesia) Greysia Polii / Apriyani Rahayu (first round)
7. (China) Du Yue / Li Yinhui (second round)
8. (South Korea) Kim So-yeong / Kong Hee-yong (quarter-finals)

=== Finals ===
Semi-finals
1	(Japan) Mayu Matsumoto (Japan) Wakana Nagahara	21	12	13
5	(South Korea) Lee So-hee (South Korea) Shin Seung-chan	12	21	21
3	(China) Chen Qingchen (China) Jia Yifan	21	15	20
2	(Japan) Yuki Fukushima (Japan) Sayaka Hirota	15	21	22

Final
5	(South Korea) Lee So-hee (South Korea) Shin Seung-chan	17	15
2	(Japan) Yuki Fukushima (Japan) Sayaka Hirota	21	21

=== Top half ===
==== Section 1 ====
First Round
1	(Japan) M Matsumoto (Japan) W Nagahara	21	21
(France) D Delrue (France) L Palermo	15	14
(Malaysia) V Hoo K M (Malaysia) Yap C W	15	9
(China) Dong WJ (China) Feng XY	21	21
7	(China) Du Y (China) Li YH	21	11
(Thailand) J Kititharakul (Thailand) R Prajongjai	12	4^{r}
(China) Li WM (China) Zheng Y	21	21
(India) A Ponnappa (India) N. S Reddy	9	8

Second Round
1	(Japan) M Matsumoto (Japan) W Nagahara	21	21
(China) Dong WJ (China) Feng XY	12	15
7	(China) Du Y (China) Li YH	21	23	18
(China) Li WM (China) Zheng Y	18	25	21

Quarter-finals
1	(Japan) M Matsumoto (Japan) W Nagahara	21	23	21
(China) Li WM (China) Zheng Y	14	25	15

==== Section 2 ====
First Round
4	(Japan) M Matsutomo (Japan) A Takahashi	21	21
(Indonesia) D D Haris (Indonesia) R A Pradipta	9	6
(Bulgaria) G Stoeva (Bulgaria) S Stoeva	21	21
(Australia) S Mapasa (Australia) G Somerville	10	14
5	(South Korea) Lee S-h (South Korea) Shin S-c	21	21
(Germany) L Efler (Germany) I Herttrich	7	10
(Thailand) P Supajirakul (Thailand) S Taerattanachai	21	21
(Chinese Taipei) Cheng C-y (Chinese Taipei) Lee C-c	5	14

Second Round
4	(Japan) M Matsutomo (Japan) A Takahashi	11	17
(Bulgaria) G Stoeva (Bulgaria) S Stoeva	21	21
5	(South Korea) Lee S-h (South Korea) Shin S-c	22	12	21
(Thailand) P Supajirakul (Thailand) S Taerattanachai	20	21	13

Quarter-finals
(Bulgaria) G Stoeva (Bulgaria) S Stoeva	14	16
5	(South Korea) Lee S-h (South Korea) Shin S-c	21	21

=== Bottom half ===
==== Section 3 ====
First Round
(South Korea) Baek H-n (South Korea) Jung K-e	21	21
(Canada) R Honderich (Canada) K Tsai	8	9
PFR	(Egypt) D Hany (Egypt) H Hosny El Said	2	4
8	(South Korea) Kim S-y (South Korea) Kong H-y	21	21
(South Korea) Chang Y-n (South Korea) Kim H-r	21	18	17
(China) Liu XX (China) Xia YT	13	21	21
(Netherlands) S Piek (Netherlands) C Seinen	12	16
3	(China) Chen QC (China) Jia YF	21	21

Second Round
(South Korea) Baek H-n (South Korea) Jung K-e	20	20
8	(South Korea) Kim S-y (South Korea) Kong H-y	22	22
(China) Liu XX (China) Xia YT	15	16
3	(China) Chen QC (China) Jia YF	21	21

Quarter-finals
8	(South Korea) Kim S-y (South Korea) Kong H-y	16	15
3	(China) Chen QC (China) Jia YF	21	21

==== Section 4 ====
First Round
(England) C Birch (England) L Smith	21	17	13
(Russia) E Bolotova (Russia) A Davletova	16	21	21
(Malaysia) Chow M K (Malaysia) Lee M Y	21	21
6	(Indonesia) G Polii (Indonesia) A Rahayu	19	16
(Chinese Taipei) Hsu Y-c (Chinese Taipei) Hu L-f	21	21
(Chinese Taipei) Chang C-h (Chinese Taipei) Yang C-t	13	11
(Japan) A Sakuramoto (Japan) Y Takahata	18	21	8
2	(Japan) Y Fukushima (Japan) S Hirota	21	10	21

Second Round
(Russia) E Bolotova (Russia) A Davletova	17	12
(Malaysia) Chow M K (Malaysia) Lee M Y	21	21
(Chinese Taipei) Hsu Y-c (Chinese Taipei) Hu L-f	12	10
2	(Japan) Y Fukushima (Japan) S Hirota	21	21

Quarter-finals
(Malaysia) Chow M K (Malaysia) Lee M Y	15	14
2	(Japan) Y Fukushima (Japan) S Hirota	21	21

== Mixed doubles ==
=== Seeds ===
1. (China) Zheng Siwei / Huang Yaqiong (final)
2. (China) Wang Yilü / Huang Dongping (champions)
3. (Thailand) Dechapol Puavaranukroh / Sapsiree Taerattanachai (quarter-finals)
4. (Japan) Yuta Watanabe / Arisa Higashino (semi-finals)
5. (South Korea) Seo Seung-jae / Chae Yoo-jung (quarter-finals)
6. (Malaysia) Chan Peng Soon / Goh Liu Ying (quarter-finals)
7. (Indonesia) Praveen Jordan / Melati Daeva Oktavianti (quarter-finals)
8. (England) Marcus Ellis / Lauren Smith (first round)

=== Finals ===
Semi-finals
1	(China) Zheng Siwei (China) Huang Yaqiong	21	21
(Malaysia) Goh Soon Huat (Malaysia) Shevon Jemie Lai	16	10
4	(Japan) Yuta Watanabe (Japan) Arisa Higashino	12	16
2	(China) Wang Yilü (China) Huang Dongping	21	21

Final
1	(China) Zheng Siwei (China) Huang Yaqiong	14	13
2	(China) Wang Yilü (China) Huang Dongping	21	21

=== Top half ===
==== Section 1 ====
First Round
1	(China) Zheng SW (China) Huang YQ	21	21
(Germany) M E Seidel (Germany) L Efler	16	13
(India) P Chopra (India) N. S Reddy	14	14
(Chinese Taipei) Wang C-l (Chinese Taipei) Cheng C-y	21	21
5	(South Korea) Seo S-j (South Korea) Chae Y-j	24	21
(China) Lu K (China) Chen L	22	18
(India) S Rankireddy (India) A Ponnappa	21	21
(Canada) J Hurlburt-Yu (Canada) J Wu	19	19

Second Round
1	(China) Zheng SW (China) Huang YQ	21	25
(Chinese Taipei) Wang C-l (Chinese Taipei) Cheng C-y	14	23
5	(South Korea) Seo S-j (South Korea) Chae Y-j	23	21
(India) S Rankireddy (India) A Ponnappa	21	16

Quarter-finals
1	(China) Zheng SW (China) Huang YQ	21	21
5	(South Korea) Seo S-j (South Korea) Chae Y-j	14	10

==== Section 2 ====
First Round
3	(Thailand) D Puavaranukroh (Thailand) S Taerattanachai	21	21
(Chinese Taipei) Lee J-h (Chinese Taipei) Hsu Y-c	9	15
(Malaysia) Tan K M (Malaysia) Lai P J	21	21
PFR	(Chinese Taipei) Lee Y (Chinese Taipei) Yang C-t	10	16
8	(England) M Ellis (England) L Smith	18	19
(Malaysia) Goh S H (Malaysia) S J Lai	21	21
(Japan) Y Kaneko (Japan) M Matsutomo	13	21	15
(Indonesia) R Rivaldy (Indonesia) P H Mentari	21	16	21

Second Round
3	(Thailand) D Puavaranukroh (Thailand) S Taerattanachai	21	21
(Malaysia) Tan K M (Malaysia) Lai P J	12	17
(Malaysia) Goh S H (Malaysia) S J Lai	23	21
(Indonesia) R Rivaldy (Indonesia) P H Mentari	21	13

Quarter-finals
3	(Thailand) D Puavaranukroh (Thailand) S Taerattanachai	13	18
(Malaysia) Goh S H (Malaysia) S J Lai	21	21

=== Bottom half ===
==== Section 3 ====
First Round
(Russia) R Alimov (Russia) A Davletova	11	17
(England) C Adcock (England) G Adcock	21	21
(Japan) T Hoki (Japan) W Nagahara	17	19
7	(Indonesia) P Jordan (Indonesia) M D Oktavianti	21	21
(Japan) K Gondo (Japan) A Kurihara	10	17
PFR	(China) Ren XY (China) Zhou CM	21	21
(Germany) M Lamsfuß (Germany) I Herttrich	13	9
4	(Japan) Y Watanabe (Japan) A Higashino	21	21

Second Round
(England) C Adcock (England) G Adcock	11	13
7	(Indonesia) P Jordan (Indonesia) M D Oktavianti	21	21
PFR	(China) Ren XY (China) Zhou CM	17	21	13
4	(Japan) Y Watanabe (Japan) A Higashino	21	16	21

Quarter-finals
7	(Indonesia) P Jordan (Indonesia) M D Oktavianti	15	18
4	(Japan) Y Watanabe (Japan) A Higashino	21	21

==== Section 4 ====
First Round
(Thailand) N Phuangphuapet (Thailand) S Amitrapai	17	11
(Netherlands) R Tabeling (Netherlands) S Piek	21	21
(France) T Gicquel (France) D Delrue	19	19
6	(Malaysia) Chan P S (Malaysia) Goh L Y	21	21
(Indonesia) H Faizal (Indonesia) G E Widjaja	18	14
(China) He JT (China) Du Y	21	21
(China) Ou XY (China) Feng XY	18	8
2	(China) Wang YL (China) Huang DP	21	21

Second Round
(Netherlands) R Tabeling (Netherlands) S Piek	18	13
6	(Malaysia) Chan P S (Malaysia) Goh L Y	21	21
(China) He JT (China) Du Y	11	12
2	(China) Wang YL (China) Huang DP	21	21

Quarter-finals
6	(Malaysia) Chan P S (Malaysia) Goh L Y	21	13	22
2	(China) Wang YL (China) Huang DP	18	21	24

Preceded by 2019 SaarLorLux Open	BWF World Tour; 2019 BWF season	Succeeded by 2019 Hong Kong Open
