= 2018 Hong Kong Open (badminton) =

2018 badminton tournament

Tournament details
- Dates: 13–18 November
- Level: Super 500
- Total prize money: US$400,000
- Venue: Hong Kong Coliseum
- Location: Hong Kong

Champions
- Men's singles: (South Korea) Son Wan-ho
- Women's singles: (Japan) Nozomi Okuhara
- Men's doubles: (Indonesia) Marcus Fernaldi Gideon (Indonesia) Kevin Sanjaya Sukamuljo
- Women's doubles: (Japan) Yuki Fukushima (Japan) Sayaka Hirota
- Mixed doubles: (Japan) Yuta Watanabe (Japan) Arisa Higashino

The 2018 Hong Kong Open (officially known as the Yonex-Sunrise Hong Kong Open 2018 for sponsorship reasons) was a badminton tournament which took place at the Hong Kong Coliseum in Hong Kong from 13 to 18 November 2018 and had a total prize of $400,000.

== Tournament ==
The 2018 Hong Kong Open was the twenty-fourth tournament of the 2018 BWF World Tour and also part of the Hong Kong Open championships, which had been held since 1982. This tournament was organized by Hong Kong Badminton Association and sanctioned by the BWF.

=== Venue ===
This international tournament was held at the Hong Kong Coliseum in Hong Kong.

=== Point distribution ===
Below is the point distribution table for each phase of the tournament based on the BWF points system for the BWF World Tour Super 500 event.

Winner	Runner-up	3/4	5/8	9/16	17/32	33/64	65/128
9,200	7,800	6,420	5,040	3,600	2,220	880	430

=== Prize money ===
The total prize money for this tournament was US$400,000. Distribution of prize money was in accordance with BWF regulations.

Event	Winner	Finals	Semi-finals	Quarter-finals	Last 16
Singles	$30,000	$15,200	$5,800	$2,400	$1,400
Doubles	$31,600	$15,200	$5,600	$2,900	$1,500

== Men's singles ==
=== Seeds ===
1. (Japan) Kento Momota (semi-finals)
2. (China) Shi Yuqi (first round)
3. (Chinese Taipei) Chou Tien-chen (first round)
4. (India) Srikanth Kidambi (quarter-finals)
5. (China) Chen Long (second round)
6. (South Korea) Son Wan-ho (champion)
7. (Indonesia) Anthony Sinisuka Ginting (second round)
8. (Japan) Kenta Nishimoto (final)

=== Finals ===
Semi-finals
1	(Japan) Kento Momota	21	16	19
6	(South Korea) Son Wan-ho	18	21	21
8	(Japan) Kenta Nishimoto	21	21
Q4	(Hong Kong) Lee Cheuk Yiu	18	12

Final
6	(South Korea) Son Wan-ho	14	21	21
8	(Japan) Kenta Nishimoto	21	17	13

=== Top half ===
==== Section 1 ====
First Round
1	(Japan) K Momota	21	12	21
(China) Lin D	19	21	15
(Japan) K Tsuneyama	6	21	21
(Indonesia) I M Mustofa	21	13	16
7	(Indonesia) A S Ginting	21	21
Q1	(India) Parupalli K	16	13
(Indonesia) J Christie	21	21
(Japan) K Sakai	16	13

Second Round
1	(Japan) K Momota	17	21	21
(Japan) K Tsuneyama	21	17	16
7	(Indonesia) A S Ginting	15	23
(Indonesia) J Christie	21	25

Quarter-finals
1	(Japan) K Momota	22	21	21
(Indonesia) J Christie	24	9	9

==== Section 2 ====
First Round
3	(Chinese Taipei) Chou T-c	21	21	20
(South Korea) Lee D-k	8	23	22
(Denmark) J Ø. Jørgensen	17	21	21
(Indonesia) T Sugiarto	21	19	10
6	(South Korea) Son W-h	21	21
Q3	(Thailand) T Saensomboonsuk	19	18
(Thailand) K Phetpradab	16	21	21
(India) B. Sai Praneeth	21	11	15

Second Round
(South Korea) Lee D-k	21	21
(Denmark) J Ø. Jørgensen	13	17
6	(South Korea) Son W-h	21	21
(Thailand) K Phetpradab	15	19

Quarter-finals
(South Korea) Lee D-k	16	14
6	(South Korea) Son W-h	21	21

=== Bottom half ===
==== Section 3 ====
First Round
(Hong Kong) Ng K L	15	16
(Thailand) K Wangcharoen	21	21
Q2	(France) L Corvée	18	21	17
8	(Japan) K Nishimoto	21	11	21
(India) Prannoy H. S.	21	13	21
(Denmark) A Antonsen	14	21	19
(Hong Kong) Wong W K	11	15
4	(India) S Kidambi	21	21

Second Round
(Thailand) K Wangcharoen	21	6	13
8	(Japan) K Nishimoto	16	21	21
(India) Prannoy H. S.	21	29	18
4	(India) S Kidambi	18	30	21

Quarter-finals
8	(Japan) K Nishimoto	21	21
4	(India) S Kidambi	17	13

==== Section 4 ====
First Round
(Thailand) S Avihingsanon	17	14
(India) S Verma	21	21
(Malaysia) Liew D	16	16
5	(China) Chen L	21	21
(Denmark) H-K Vittinghus	12	21	21
(China) Huang YX	21	15	16
Q4	(Hong Kong) Lee C Y	11
2	(China) Shi YQ	3^{r}

Second Round
(India) S Verma	w	/	o
5	(China) Chen L
(Denmark) H-K Vittinghus	12	21
Q4	(Hong Kong) Lee C Y	21	23

Quarter-finals
(India) S Verma	15	21	11
Q4	(Hong Kong) Lee C Y	21	19	21

== Women's singles ==
=== Seeds ===
1. (Chinese Taipei) Tai Tzu-ying (semi-finals)
2. (Japan) Akane Yamaguchi (quarter-finals)
3. (India) P. V. Sindhu (second round)
4. (China) Chen Yufei (first round)
5. (Spain) Carolina Marín (quarter-finals)
6. (Thailand) Ratchanok Intanon (final)
7. (Japan) Nozomi Okuhara (champion)
8. (China) He Bingjiao (quarter-finals)

=== Finals ===
Semi-finals
1	(Chinese Taipei) Tai Tzu-ying	12	1^{r}
7	(Japan) Nozomi Okuhara	21	3
(South Korea) Sung Ji-hyun	21	11	17
6	(Thailand) Ratchanok Intanon	10	21	21

Final
7	(Japan) Nozomi Okuhara	21	24
6	(Thailand) Ratchanok Intanon	19	22

=== Top half ===
==== Section 1 ====
First Round
1	(Chinese Taipei) Tai T-y	16	21	21
(Hong Kong) Yip P Y	21	8	14
(Hong Kong) Cheung N Y	18	21	21
Q3	(Indonesia) D D Ayustine	21	17	13
5	(Spain) C Marín	21	21
(Thailand) B Ongbamrungphan	10	18
(Chinese Taipei) Pai Y-p	11	14
(Canada) M Li	21	21

Second Round
1	(Chinese Taipei) Tai T-y	17	21	21
(Hong Kong) Cheung N Y	21	16	9
5	(Spain) C Marín	21	21
(Canada) M Li	14	8

Quarter-finals
1	(Chinese Taipei) Tai T-y	18	21	21
5	(Spain) C Marín	21	9	14

==== Section 2 ====
First Round
4	(China) Chen YF	21	10	20
(Thailand) P Chochuwong	14	21	22
(Russia) E Kosetskaya	21	19	15
(Denmark) M Blichfeldt	18	21	21
7	(Japan) N Okuhara	23	21
(Malaysia) S Cheah S Y	21	18
(Japan) S Kawakami	0^{r}
(China) Gao FJ	2

Second Round
(Thailand) P Chochuwong	17	21	21
(Denmark) M Blichfeldt	21	10	13
7	(Japan) N Okuhara	21	21
(China) Gao FJ	17	9

Quarter-finals
(Thailand) P Chochuwong	12	21	6
7	(Japan) N Okuhara	21	16	21

=== Bottom half ===
==== Section 3 ====
First Round
(Japan) S Takahashi	21	13	19
(China) Cai YY	17	21	21
Q2	(China) Li XR	21	8	12
8	(China) He BJ	11	21	21
(South Korea) Sung J-h	21	21
(Japan) A Ohori	10	12
(Thailand) N Jindapol	15	21	17
3	(India) P. V. Sindhu	21	13	21

Second Round
(China) Cai YY	16	18
8	(China) He BJ	21	21
(South Korea) Sung J-h	26	22
3	(India) P. V. Sindhu	24	20

Quarter-finals
8	(China) He BJ	13	11^{r}
(South Korea) Sung J-h	21	19

==== Section 4 ====
First Round
(China) Chen XX	21	21
Q1	(Indonesia) R Hartawan	18	16
(Japan) S Sato	22	13	15
6	(Thailand) R Intanon	20	21	21
Q4	(Hong Kong) Deng X	18	23	16
(China) Han Y	21	21	21
(India) S Nehwal	21	10	19
2	(Japan) A Yamaguchi	10	21	21

Second Round
(China) Chen XX	16	16
6	(Thailand) R Intanon	21	21
(China) Han Y	19	11
2	(Japan) A Yamaguchi	21	21

Quarter-finals
6	(Thailand) R Intanon	21	21
2	(Japan) A Yamaguchi	9	16

== Men's doubles ==
=== Seeds ===
1. (Indonesia) Marcus Fernaldi Gideon / Kevin Sanjaya Sukamuljo (champions)
2. (China) Li Junhui / Liu Yuchen (first round)
3. (China) Liu Cheng / Zhang Nan (first round)
4. (Japan) Takeshi Kamura / Keigo Sonoda (final)
5. (Chinese Taipei) Chen Hung-ling / Wang Chi-lin (first round)
6. (Denmark) Kim Astrup / Anders Skaarup Rasmussen (quarter-finals)
7. (Denmark) Mads Conrad-Petersen / Mads Pieler Kolding (first round)
8. (Indonesia) Fajar Alfian / Muhammad Rian Ardianto (semi-finals)

=== Finals ===
Semi-finals
1	(Indonesia) Marcus Fernaldi Gideon (Indonesia) Kevin Sanjaya Sukamuljo	21	18	21
(Indonesia) Mohammad Ahsan (Indonesia) Hendra Setiawan	14	21	9
4	(Japan) Takeshi Kamura (Japan) Keigo Sonoda	24	21
8	(Indonesia) Fajar Alfian (Indonesia) Muhammad Rian Ardianto	22	15

Final
1	(Indonesia) Marcus Fernaldi Gideon (Indonesia) Kevin Sanjaya Sukamuljo	21	21
4	(Japan) Takeshi Kamura (Japan) Keigo Sonoda	13	12

=== Top half ===
==== Section 1 ====
First Round
1	(Indonesia) M F Gideon (Indonesia) K S Sukamuljo	21	21
(Japan) H Endo (Japan) Y Watanabe	14	15
(Denmark) M Boe (Denmark) C Mogensen	21	23
(India) S Rankireddy (India) C Shetty	19	21
7	(Denmark) M Conrad-Petersen (Denmark) M P Kolding	12	11
Q3	(South Korea) Kim G-j (South Korea) Lee Y-d	21	21
(Thailand) K Kedren (Thailand) D Puavaranukroh	11	21	18
Q1	(South Korea) Chung E-s (South Korea) Kim D-y	21	16	21

Second Round
1	(Indonesia) M F Gideon (Indonesia) K S Sukamuljo	16	21	21
(Denmark) M Boe (Denmark) C Mogensen	21	19	9
Q3	(South Korea) Kim G-j (South Korea) Lee Y-d	21	21
Q1	(South Korea) Chung E-s (South Korea) Kim D-y	15	14

Quarter-finals
1	(Indonesia) M F Gideon (Indonesia) K S Sukamuljo	20	21	21
Q3	(South Korea) Kim G-j (South Korea) Lee Y-d	22	9	15

==== Section 2 ====
First Round
3	(China) Liu C (China) Zhang N	21	18	15
(Malaysia) Goh V S (Malaysia) Tan W K	11	21	21
(Indonesia) M Ahsan (Indonesia) H Setiawan	21	24
(South Korea) Kang M-h (South Korea) Kim W-h	17	22
6	(Denmark) K Astrup (Denmark) A S Rasmussen	28	21	21
(Chinese Taipei) Lu C-y (Chinese Taipei) Yang P-h	30	19	16
(China) Ou XY (China) Ren XY	14	21	21
(Indonesia) W Nayaka (Indonesia) A Yusuf	21	12	14

Second Round
(Malaysia) Goh V S (Malaysia) Tan W K	16	21	12
(Indonesia) M Ahsan (Indonesia) H Setiawan	21	12	21
6	(Denmark) K Astrup (Denmark) A S Rasmussen	21	21
(China) Ou XY (China) Ren XY	15	15

Quarter-finals
(Indonesia) M Ahsan (Indonesia) H Setiawan	21	21
6	(Denmark) K Astrup (Denmark) A S Rasmussen	19	14

=== Bottom half ===
==== Section 3 ====
First Round
(Malaysia) Ong Y S (Malaysia) Teo E Y	20	13
(Japan) T Hoki (Japan) Y Kobayashi	22	21
(China) He JT (China) Tan Q	21	22
5	(Chinese Taipei) Chen H-l (Chinese Taipei) Wang C-l	17	20
Q2	(Hong Kong) Chung Y (Hong Kong) Tam C H	13	21	17
(Japan) T Inoue (Japan) Y Kaneko	21	12	21
(Indonesia) B Angriawan (Indonesia) Hardianto	10	14
4	(Japan) T Kamura (Japan) K Sonoda	21	21

Second Round
(Japan) T Hoki (Japan) Y Kobayashi	20	15
(China) He JT (China) Tan Q	22	21
(Japan) T Inoue (Japan) Y Kaneko	19	19
4	(Japan) T Kamura (Japan) K Sonoda	21	21

Quarter-finals
(China) He JT (China) Tan Q	18	18
4	(Japan) T Kamura (Japan) K Sonoda	21	21

==== Section 4 ====
First Round
Q4	(Chinese Taipei) Chang K-c (Chinese Taipei) Lu C-p	22	19
(Chinese Taipei) Liao M-c (Chinese Taipei) Su C-h	24	21
(Russia) V Ivanov (Russia) I Sozonov	23	19
8	(Indonesia) F Alfian (Indonesia) M R Ardianto	25	21
(Thailand) B Isara (Thailand) M Jongjit	12	18
(India) M Attri (India) B. S Reddy	21	21
(Chinese Taipei) Lee J-h (Chinese Taipei) Lee Y	21	21
2	(China) Li JH (China) Liu YC	12	15

Second Round
(Chinese Taipei) Liao M-c (Chinese Taipei) Su C-h	12	13
8	(Indonesia) F Alfian (Indonesia) M R Ardianto	21	21
(India) M Attri (India) B. S Reddy	16	15
(Chinese Taipei) Lee J-h (Chinese Taipei) Lee Y	21	21

Quarter-finals
8	(Indonesia) F Alfian (Indonesia) M R Ardianto	21	25
(Chinese Taipei) Lee J-h (Chinese Taipei) Lee Y	17	23

== Women's doubles ==
=== Seeds ===
1. (Japan) Yuki Fukushima / Sayaka Hirota (champions)
2. (Japan) Misaki Matsutomo / Ayaka Takahashi (quarter-finals)
3. (China) Chen Qingchen / Jia Yifan (first round)
4. (Indonesia) Greysia Polii / Apriyani Rahayu (semi-finals)
5. (Japan) Mayu Matsumoto / Wakana Nagahara (first round)
6. (Japan) Shiho Tanaka / Koharu Yonemoto (semi-finals)
7. (South Korea) Lee So-hee / Shin Seung-chan (final)
8. (Thailand) Jongkolphan Kititharakul / Rawinda Prajongjai (second round)

=== Finals ===
Semi-finals
1	(Japan) Yuki Fukushima (Japan) Sayaka Hirota	20	21	21
4	(Indonesia) Greysia Polii (Indonesia) Apriyani Rahayu	22	9	12
7	(South Korea) Lee So-hee (South Korea) Shin Seung-chan	21	21
6	(Japan) Shiho Tanaka (Japan) Koharu Yonemoto	16	12

Final
1	(Japan) Yuki Fukushima (Japan) Sayaka Hirota	21	21
7	(South Korea) Lee So-hee (South Korea) Shin Seung-chan	18	17

=== Top half ===
==== Section 1 ====
First Round
1	(Japan) Y Fukushima (Japan) S Hirota	21	21
Q2	(Hong Kong) Lui L L (Hong Kong) Tsang H Y	10	9
(Chinese Taipei) Lin W-c (Chinese Taipei) Wu T-j	14	7
(China) Dong WJ (China) Feng XY	21	21
8	(Thailand) J Kititharakul (Thailand) R Prajongjai	21	21
(Macau) Gong X X (Macau) Ng W C	8	3
(Indonesia) D D Haris (Indonesia) R A Pradipta	19	21	21
(Hong Kong) Ng T Y (Hong Kong) Yuen S Y	21	17	17

Second Round
1	(Japan) Y Fukushima (Japan) S Hirota	21	16	21
(China) Dong WJ (China) Feng XY	17	21	14
8	(Thailand) J Kititharakul (Thailand) R Prajongjai	21	9	10
(Indonesia) D D Haris (Indonesia) R A Pradipta	19	21	21

Quarter-finals
1	(Japan) Y Fukushima (Japan) S Hirota	21	21
(Indonesia) D D Haris (Indonesia) R A Pradipta	15	19

==== Section 2 ====
First Round
4	(Indonesia) G Polii (Indonesia) A Rahayu	21	21
PFQ	(Hong Kong) Ng S Y (Hong Kong) Wu Y T	14	16
(South Korea) Baek H-n (South Korea) Kim H-r	21	21
Q4	(Hong Kong) Cheung Y M (Hong Kong) Tsang W C	9	6
5	(Japan) M Matsumoto (Japan) W Nagahara	26	19	18
(China) Du Y (China) Li YH	24	21	21
(United States) E Kan (United States) I Zhong	5	9
(Denmark) M Fruergaard (Denmark) S Thygesen	21	21

Second Round
4	(Indonesia) G Polii (Indonesia) A Rahayu	21	21
(South Korea) Baek H-n (South Korea) Kim H-r	15	18
(China) Du Y (China) Li YH	21	21
(Denmark) M Fruergaard (Denmark) S Thygesen	19	17

Quarter-finals
4	(Indonesia) G Polii (Indonesia) A Rahayu	23	21
(China) Du Y (China) Li YH	21	15

=== Bottom half ===
==== Section 3 ====
First Round
(Hong Kong) Ng W Y (Hong Kong) Yeung N T	13	17
(China) Li WM (China) Zheng Y	21	21
(Chinese Taipei) Hsu Y-c (Chinese Taipei) Hu L-f	21	18	15
7	(South Korea) Lee S-h (South Korea) Shin S-c	14	21	21
(Thailand) P Supajirakul (Thailand) S Taerattanachai	19	21	24
(Japan) N Fukuman (Japan) K Yonao	21	18	22
(France) É Lefel (France) A Tran	4
3	(China) Chen QC (China) Jia YF	1^{r}

Second Round
(China) Li WM (China) Zheng Y	15	16
7	(South Korea) Lee S-h (South Korea) Shin S-c	21	21
(Thailand) P Supajirakul (Thailand) S Taerattanachai	21	21
(France) É Lefel (France) A Tran	15	15

Quarter-finals
7	(South Korea) Lee S-h (South Korea) Shin S-c	13	21	21
(Thailand) P Supajirakul (Thailand) S Taerattanachai	21	17	18

==== Section 4 ====
First Round
Q1
(Thailand) C Chaladchalam (Thailand) P Muenwong	w	/	o
Q3	(South Korea) Kim H-j (South Korea) Kong H-y	15	21	19
6	(Japan) S Tanaka (Japan) K Yonemoto	21	17	21
(South Korea) Chang Y-n (South Korea) Jung K-e	21	21
(Chinese Taipei) Chang C-h (Chinese Taipei) Yang C-t	9	10
(India) A Ponnappa (India) N. S Reddy	21	10	8
2	(Japan) M Matsutomo (Japan) A Takahashi	18	21	21

Second Round
(Thailand) C Chaladchalam (Thailand) P Muenwong	13	21	21
6	(Japan) S Tanaka (Japan) K Yonemoto	21	16	23
(South Korea) Chang Y-n (South Korea) Jung K-e	14	22
2	(Japan) M Matsutomo (Japan) A Takahashi	21	24

Quarter-finals
6	(Japan) S Tanaka (Japan) K Yonemoto	21	21
2	(Japan) M Matsutomo (Japan) A Takahashi	17	18

== Mixed doubles ==
=== Seeds ===
1. (China) Zheng Siwei / Huang Yaqiong (withdrew)
2. (China) Wang Yilü / Huang Dongping (final)
3. (Hong Kong) Tang Chun Man / Tse Ying Suet (second round)
4. (Denmark) Mathias Christiansen / Christinna Pedersen (first round)
5. (China) Zhang Nan / Li Yinhui (first round)
6. (Malaysia) Chan Peng Soon / Goh Liu Ying (first round)
7. (Japan) Yuta Watanabe / Arisa Higashino (champions)
8. (Malaysia) Goh Soon Huat / Shevon Jemie Lai (second round)

=== Finals ===
Semi-finals
7	(Japan) Yuta Watanabe (Japan) Arisa Higashino	21	21
(Chinese Taipei) Lee Yang (Chinese Taipei) Hsu Ya-ching	11	10
(Thailand) Dechapol Puavaranukroh (Thailand) Sapsiree Taerattanachai	17	13
2	(China) Wang Yilü (China) Huang Dongping	21	21

Final
7	(Japan) Yuta Watanabe (Japan) Arisa Higashino	21	21
2	(China) Wang Yilü (China) Huang Dongping	18	14

=== Top half ===
==== Section 1 ====
First Round
PFQ	(Japan) Y Kaneko (Japan) M Matsutomo	19	21	19
(Japan) Y Kobayashi (Japan) K Yonemoto	21	11	21
Q1	(Japan) T Hoki (Japan) W Nagahara	21	21
(Denmark) J Fischer Nielsen (Denmark) A Bøje	19	14
7	(Japan) Y Watanabe (Japan) A Higashino	21	21
(Indonesia) T Ahmad (Indonesia) D D Haris	15	9
Q3	(Hong Kong) Mak H C (Hong Kong) Yeung N T	12	7
(China) He JT (China) Du Y	21	21

Second Round
(Japan) Y Kobayashi (Japan) K Yonemoto	12	21	14
Q1	(Japan) T Hoki (Japan) W Nagahara	21	16	21
7	(Japan) Y Watanabe (Japan) A Higashino	21	21
(China) He JT (China) Du Y	17	12

Quarter-finals
Q1	(Japan) T Hoki (Japan) W Nagahara	13	19
7	(Japan) Y Watanabe (Japan) A Higashino	21	21

==== Section 2 ====
First Round
4	(Denmark) M Christiansen (Denmark) C Pedersen	21	20
(Chinese Taipei) Lee Y (Chinese Taipei) Hsu Y-c	23	22
(Chinese Taipei) Wang C-l (Chinese Taipei) Lee C-h	16	21	14
(India) S Rankireddy (India) A Ponnappa	21	19	21
5	(China) Zhang N (China) Li YH	14	15
PFQ	(Indonesia) R Alexander (Indonesia) A Saufika	21	21
Q4	(China) Ou XY (China) Feng XY	20	23	17
(Thailand) N Phuangphuapet (Thailand) S Amitrapai	22	21	21

Second Round
(Chinese Taipei) Lee Y (Chinese Taipei) Hsu Y-c	21	21
(India) S Rankireddy (India) A Ponnappa	17	11
PFQ	(Indonesia) R Alexander (Indonesia) A Saufika	14	14
(Thailand) N Phuangphuapet (Thailand) S Amitrapai	21	21

Quarter-finals
(Chinese Taipei) Lee Y (Chinese Taipei) Hsu Y-c	21	21
(Thailand) N Phuangphuapet (Thailand) S Amitrapai	16	14

=== Bottom half ===
==== Section 3 ====
First Round
(China) Ren XY (China) Zhou CM	21	16
(Thailand) D Puavaranukroh (Thailand) S Taerattanachai	23	21
(England) C Adcock (England) G Adcock	21	21
6	(Malaysia) Chan P S (Malaysia) Goh L Y	19	16
(Indonesia) H Faizal (Indonesia) G E Widjaja	21	21
Q2	(Hong Kong) Chung Y (Hong Kong) Wu Y T	18	19
(Denmark) N Nøhr (Denmark) S Thygesen	9	10
3	(Hong Kong) Tang C M (Hong Kong) Tse Y S	21	21

Second Round
(Thailand) D Puavaranukroh (Thailand) S Taerattanachai	23	21
(England) C Adcock (England) G Adcock	21	12
(Indonesia) H Faizal (Indonesia) G E Widjaja	21	14	21
3	(Hong Kong) Tang C M (Hong Kong) Tse Y S	16	21	15

Quarter-finals
(Thailand) D Puavaranukroh (Thailand) S Taerattanachai	21	15	21
(Indonesia) H Faizal (Indonesia) G E Widjaja	12	21	13

==== Section 4 ====
First Round
(Hong Kong) Chang T C (Hong Kong) Ng W Y	21	15	15
(Indonesia) P Jordan (Indonesia) M D Oktavianti	18	21	21
(France) R Labar (France) A Mittelheisser	7	8
8	(Malaysia) Goh S H (Malaysia) S J Lai	21	21
(Malaysia) Tan K M (Malaysia) Lai P J	20	21	21
(Chinese Taipei) Chang K-c (Chinese Taipei) Cheng C-y	22	17	18
(Hong Kong) Lee C H (Hong Kong) Chau H W	16	21	15
2	(China) Wang YL (China) Huang DP	21	15	21

Second Round
(Indonesia) P Jordan (Indonesia) M D Oktavianti	21	21
8	(Malaysia) Goh S H (Malaysia) S J Lai	14	16
(Malaysia) Tan K M (Malaysia) Lai P J	11	21	6
2	(China) Wang YL (China) Huang DP	21	18	21

Quarter-finals
(Indonesia) P Jordan (Indonesia) M D Oktavianti	14	21	14
2	(China) Wang YL (China) Huang DP	21	14	21

Preceded by 2018 Fuzhou China Open	BWF World Tour; 2018 BWF season	Succeeded by 2018 Syed Modi International
