= 2019 Hong Kong Open (badminton) =

2019 badminton tournament

Tournament details
- Dates: 12–17 November
- Level: Super 500
- Total prize money: US$400,000
- Venue: Hong Kong Coliseum
- Location: Hong Kong

Champions
- Men's singles: (Hong Kong) Lee Cheuk Yiu
- Women's singles: (China) Chen Yufei
- Men's doubles: (South Korea) Choi Sol-gyu (South Korea) Seo Seung-jae
- Women's doubles: (China) Chen Qingchen (China) Jia Yifan
- Mixed doubles: (Japan) Yuta Watanabe (Japan) Arisa Higashino

The 2019 Hong Kong Open (officially known as the Yonex-Sunrise Hong Kong Open 2019 for sponsorship reasons) was a badminton tournament which took place at the Hong Kong Coliseum in Hong Kong from 12 to 17 November 2019 and had a total prize of $400,000.

== Tournament ==
The 2019 Hong Kong Open was the twenty-fourth tournament of the 2019 BWF World Tour and also part of the Hong Kong Open championships, which has been held since 1982. This tournament was organized by Hong Kong Badminton Association and sanctioned by the BWF.

=== Venue ===
This international tournament was held at the Hong Kong Coliseum in Hong Kong.

=== Point distribution ===
Below is the point distribution table for each phase of the tournament based on the BWF points system for the BWF World Tour Super 500 event.

Winner	Runner-up	3/4	5/8	9/16	17/32	33/64	65/128
9,200	7,800	6,420	5,040	3,600	2,220	880	430

=== Prize money ===
The total prize money for this tournament was US$400,000. Distribution of prize money was in accordance with BWF regulations.

Event	Winner	Finals	Semi-finals	Quarter-finals	Last 16
Singles	$30,000	$15,200	$5,800	$2,400	$1,400
Doubles	$31,600	$15,200	$5,600	$2,900	$1,500

== Men's singles ==
=== Seeds ===
1. (Japan) Kento Momota (first round)
2. (Chinese Taipei) Chou Tien-chen (quarter-finals)
3. (China) Shi Yuqi (second round)
4. (Denmark) Anders Antonsen (quarter-finals)
5. (China) Chen Long (quarter-finals)
6. (Indonesia) Jonatan Christie (semi-finals)
7. (Denmark) Viktor Axelsen (quarter-finals)
8. (Indonesia) Anthony Sinisuka Ginting (final)

=== Finals ===
Semi-finals
(India) Srikanth Kidambi	9	23
PFQ	(Hong Kong) Lee Cheuk Yiu	21	25
6	(Indonesia) Jonatan Christie	20	21	18
8	(Indonesia) Anthony Sinisuka Ginting	22	13	21

Final
PFQ	(Hong Kong) Lee Cheuk Yiu	16	21	22
8	(Indonesia) Anthony Sinisuka Ginting	21	10	20

=== Top half ===
==== Section 1 ====
First Round
1	(Japan) K Momota
(India) S Kidambi	w	/	o
Q4	(France) B Leverdez	11	15
Q3	(India) So Verma	21	21
5	(China) Chen L	21	21
(Indonesia) S H Rhustavito	18	18
(India) Sa Verma	11	21	8
(Chinese Taipei) Wang T-w	21	13	21

Second Round
(India) S Kidambi	21	15	21
Q3	(India) So Verma	11	21	19
5	(China) Chen L	18	21	21
(Chinese Taipei) Wang T-w	21	12	14

Quarter-finals
(India) S Kidambi	21	0
5	(China) Chen L	13	0^{r}

==== Section 2 ====
First Round
3	(China) Shi YQ	11	21	21
(India) B. Sai Praneeth	21	18	12
PFQ	(Hong Kong) Lee C Y	21	21
(Thailand) S Thammasin	14	16
7	(Denmark) V Axelsen	21	21
(South Korea) Son W-h	9	14
Q2	(Malaysia) Liew D	21	18	21
(Denmark) R Gemke	18	21	15

Second Round
3	(China) Shi YQ	9	24
PFQ	(Hong Kong) Lee C Y	21	26
7	(Denmark) V Axelsen	21	21
Q2	(Malaysia) Liew D	14	16

Quarter-finals
PFQ	(Hong Kong) Lee C Y	21	21
7	(Denmark) V Axelsen	14	19

=== Bottom half ===
==== Section 3 ====
First Round
(India) Prannoy K	21	21
(China) Huang YX	17	17
Q1	(Hong Kong) Wong W K	22	14	13
6	(Indonesia) J Christie	20	21	21
(Denmark) H-K Vittinghus	24	17	16
(China) Lin D	22	21	21
(China) Lu GZ	13	13
4	(Denmark) A Antonsen	21	21

Second Round
(India) Prannoy K	12	19
6	(Indonesia) J Christie	21	21
(China) Lin D	14	11
4	(Denmark) A Antonsen	21	21

Quarter-finals
6	(Indonesia) J Christie	21	21
4	(Denmark) A Antonsen	15	13

==== Section 4 ====
First Round
(Thailand) K Wangcharoen	20	21	7
(Denmark) J Ø. Jørgensen	22	14	21
(Hong Kong) Ng K L	16	21	11
8	(Indonesia) A S Ginting	21	17	21
(India) Parupalli K	21	16	21
(Japan) K Nishimoto	18	21	10
(Japan) K Tsuneyama	5	26	15
2	(Chinese Taipei) Chou T-c	21	24	21

Second Round
(Denmark) J Ø. Jørgensen	22	19	14
8	(Indonesia) A S Ginting	20	21	21
(India) Parupalli K	21	21	10
2	(Chinese Taipei) Chou T-c	12	23	21

Quarter-finals
8	(Indonesia) A S Ginting	8	21	21
2	(Chinese Taipei) Chou T-c	21	19	13

== Women's singles ==
=== Seeds ===
1. (Chinese Taipei) Tai Tzu-ying (withdrew)
2. (Japan) Akane Yamaguchi (semi-finals)
3. (China) Chen Yufei (champion)
4. (Japan) Nozomi Okuhara (quarter-finals)
5. (Thailand) Ratchanok Intanon (final)
6. (India) P. V. Sindhu (second round)
7. (China) He Bingjiao (quarter-finals)
8. (India) Saina Nehwal (first round)

=== Finals ===
Semi-finals
(United States) Zhang Beiwen	18	21	15
3	(China) Chen Yufei	21	14	21
5	(Thailand) Ratchanok Intanon	21	21	21
2	(Japan) Akane Yamaguchi	23	15	12

Final
3	(China) Chen Yufei	21	13	21
5	(Thailand) Ratchanok Intanon	18	21	13

=== Top half ===
==== Section 1 ====
First Round
PFQ	(Indonesia) R Hartawan	21	21
(China) Han Y	18	17
(South Korea) An S-y	21	21
Q2	(Hong Kong) Yip P Y	9	14
8	(India) S Nehwal	13	20
(China) Cai YY	21	22
(Canada) M Li	18	18
(United States) Zhang BW	21	21

Second Round
PFQ	(Indonesia) R Hartawan	21	21
(South Korea) An S-y	18	19
(China) Cai YY	8	17
(United States) Zhang BW	21	21

Quarter-finals
PFQ	(Indonesia) R Hartawan	17	17
(United States) Zhang BW	21	21

==== Section 2 ====
First Round
3	(China) Chen YF	21	21
(South Korea) Sung J-h	19	19
PFQ	(Turkey) N Yiğit	12	8
(Japan) S Takahashi	21	21
7	(China) He BJ	10	21	21
(Denmark) M Blichfeldt	21	15	16
(Denmark) L Kjærsfeldt	21	17	17
Q4	(Hong Kong) Cheung Y M	13	21	21

Second Round
3	(China) Chen YF	21	17	21
(Japan) S Takahashi	9	21	10
7	(China) He BJ	21	21
Q4	(Hong Kong) Cheung Y M	14	16

Quarter-finals
3	(China) Chen YF	16	21	21
7	(China) He BJ	21	9	15

=== Bottom half ===
==== Section 3 ====
First Round
(Russia) E Kosetskaya	15	21
(Thailand) N Jindapol	21	23
PFQ	(South Korea) Kim H-m	12	8
5	(Thailand) R Intanon	21	21
Q1	(United States) L Lam	15	14
(Thailand) P Chochuwong	21	21
(Hong Kong) Cheung N Y	12	0^{r}
4	(Japan) N Okuhara	21	11

Second Round
(Thailand) N Jindapol	17	10
5	(Thailand) R Intanon	21	21
(Thailand) P Chochuwong	16	10
4	(Japan) N Okuhara	21	21

Quarter-finals
5	(Thailand) R Intanon	21	21
4	(Japan) N Okuhara	14	19

==== Section 4 ====
First Round
(Thailand) B Ongbamrungphan	21	15	21
Q3	(Chinese Taipei) Pai Y-p	11	21	10
(South Korea) Kim G-e	15	16
6	(India) P. V. Sindhu	21	21
(Scotland) K Gilmour	16	17
(Japan) A Ohori	21	21
(Malaysia) S Cheah S Y	16	16
2	(Japan) A Yamaguchi	21	21

Second Round
(Thailand) B Ongbamrungphan	21	11	21
6	(India) P. V. Sindhu	18	21	16
(Japan) A Ohori	21	13
2	(Japan) A Yamaguchi	23	21

Quarter-finals
(Thailand) B Ongbamrungphan	21	17	15
2	(Japan) A Yamaguchi	9	21	21

== Men's doubles ==
=== Seeds ===
1. (Indonesia) Marcus Fernaldi Gideon / Kevin Sanjaya Sukamuljo (quarter-finals)
2. (Indonesia) Mohammad Ahsan / Hendra Setiawan (final)
3. (China) Li Junhui / Liu Yuchen (semi-finals)
4. (Japan) Takeshi Kamura / Keigo Sonoda (first round)
5. (Indonesia) Fajar Alfian / Muhammad Rian Ardianto (second round)
6. (Japan) Hiroyuki Endo / Yuta Watanabe (semi-finals)
7. (China) Han Chengkai / Zhou Haodong (first round)
8. (Denmark) Kim Astrup / Anders Skaarup Rasmussen (second round)

=== Finals ===
Semi-finals
6	(Japan) Hiroyuki Endo (Japan) Yuta Watanabe	17	19
(South Korea) Choi Sol-gyu (South Korea) Seo Seung-jae	21	21
3	(China) Li Junhui (China) Liu Yuchen	13	21	16
2	(Indonesia) Mohammad Ahsan (Indonesia) Hendra Setiawan	21	16	21

Final
(South Korea) Choi Sol-gyu (South Korea) Seo Seung-jae	13	21	21
2	(Indonesia) Mohammad Ahsan (Indonesia) Hendra Setiawan	21	12	13

=== Top half ===
==== Section 1 ====
First Round
1	(Indonesia) M F Gideon (Indonesia) K S Sukamuljo	21	21
(Chinese Taipei) Lu C-y (Chinese Taipei) Yang P-ha	18	17
(Chinese Taipei) Liao M-c (Chinese Taipei) Su C-h	17	16
PFQ	(China) Huang KX (China) Liu C	21	21
6	(Japan) H Endo (Japan) Y Watanabe	19	21	21
(China) He JT (China) Tan Q	21	19	10
Q2	(China) Ou XY (China) Zhang N	21	21
Q4	(Hong Kong) Chang T C (Hong Kong) Yeung M N	14	17

Second Round
1	(Indonesia) M F Gideon (Indonesia) K S Sukamuljo	19	21	21
PFQ	(China) Huang KX (China) Liu C	21	18	11
6	(Japan) H Endo (Japan) Y Watanabe	21	21
Q2	(China) Ou XY (China) Zhang N	18	8

Quarter-finals
1	(Indonesia) M F Gideon (Indonesia) K S Sukamuljo	21	14	20
6	(Japan) H Endo (Japan) Y Watanabe	16	21	22

==== Section 2 ====
First Round
4	(Japan) T Kamura (Japan) K Sonoda	19	18
(South Korea) Choi S-g (South Korea) Seo S-j	21	21
PFQ	(Chinese Taipei) Lee J-h (Chinese Taipei) Yang P-hs	21	21
(Netherlands) J Maas (Netherlands) R Tabeling	16	14
5	(Indonesia) F Alfian (Indonesia) M R Ardianto	23	21
(Chinese Taipei) Lee Y (Chinese Taipei) Wang C-l	21	14
(Malaysia) Ong Y S (Malaysia) Teo E Y	17	25	21
Q1	(South Korea) Kang M-h (South Korea) Kim J-h	21	23	16

Second Round
(South Korea) Choi S-g (South Korea) Seo S-j	24	21
PFQ	(Chinese Taipei) Lee J-h (Chinese Taipei) Yang P-hs	22	18
5	(Indonesia) F Alfian (Indonesia) M R Ardianto	19	14
(Malaysia) Ong Y S (Malaysia) Teo E Y	21	21

Quarter-finals
(South Korea) Choi S-g (South Korea) Seo S-j	21	21
(Malaysia) Ong Y S (Malaysia) Teo E Y	13	19

=== Bottom half ===
==== Section 3 ====
First Round
(Malaysia) A Chia (Malaysia) Soh W Y	21	21
PFQ	(Indonesia) R K Suwardi (Indonesia) A Pratama	13	14
(Germany) M Lamsfuß (Germany) M E Seidel	14	21	12
8	(Denmark) K Astrup (Denmark) A S Rasmussen	21	19	21
(India) S Rankireddy (India) C Shetty	21	16	17
(Japan) T Hoki (Japan) Y Kobayashi	17	21	21
(Japan) T Inoue (Japan) Y Kaneko	11	5
3	(China) Li JH (China) Liu YC	21	21

Second Round
(Malaysia) A Chia (Malaysia) Soh W Y	21	21
8	(Denmark) K Astrup (Denmark) A S Rasmussen	15	13
(Japan) T Hoki (Japan) Y Kobayashi
3	(China) Li JH (China) Liu YC	w	/	o

Quarter-finals
(Malaysia) A Chia (Malaysia) Soh W Y	17	21	21
3	(China) Li JH (China) Liu YC	21	19	23

==== Section 4 ====
First Round
(Malaysia) Goh V S (Malaysia) Tan W K	12	15
(Russia) V Ivanov (Russia) I Sozonov	21	21
(Denmark) M Boe (Denmark) M Conrad-Petersen	15	21	21
7	(China) Han CK (China) Zhou HD	21	17	16
(Indonesia) W Nayaka (Indonesia) A Yusuf	6	21	21
PFQ	(Japan) A Koga (Japan) T Saito	21	19	19
Q3	(Hong Kong) Lam W L (Hong Kong) Li K H	11	14
2	(Indonesia) M Ahsan (Indonesia) H Setiawan	21	21

Second Round
(Russia) V Ivanov (Russia) I Sozonov	21	17	12
(Denmark) M Boe (Denmark) M Conrad-Petersen	15	21	21
(Indonesia) W Nayaka (Indonesia) A Yusuf	17	18
2	(Indonesia) M Ahsan (Indonesia) H Setiawan	21	21

Quarter-finals
(Denmark) M Boe (Denmark) M Conrad-Petersen	11	11
2	(Indonesia) M Ahsan (Indonesia) H Setiawan	21	21

== Women's doubles ==
=== Seeds ===
1. (Japan) Mayu Matsumoto / Wakana Nagahara (semi-finals)
2. (Japan) Yuki Fukushima / Sayaka Hirota (second round)
3. (China) Chen Qingchen / Jia Yifan (champions)
4. (Japan) Misaki Matsutomo / Ayaka Takahashi (quarter-finals)
5. (South Korea) Lee So-hee / Shin Seung-chan (quarter-finals)
6. (Indonesia) Greysia Polii / Apriyani Rahayu (withdrew)
7. (China) Du Yue / Li Yinhui (quarter-finals)
8. (South Korea) Kim So-yeong / Kong Hee-yong (second round)

=== Finals ===
Semi-finals
1	(Japan) Mayu Matsumoto (Japan) Wakana Nagahara	18	14
(South Korea) Chang Ye-na (South Korea) Kim Hye-rin	21	21
3	(China) Chen Qingchen (China) Jia Yifan	21	23
(South Korea) Baek Ha-na (South Korea) Jung Kyung-eun	17	21

Final
(South Korea) Chang Ye-na (South Korea) Kim Hye-rin	11	21	15
3	(China) Chen Qingchen (China) Jia Yifan	21	13	21

=== Top half ===
==== Section 1 ====
First Round
1	(Japan) M Matsumoto (Japan) W Nagahara	11
(Thailand) J Kititharakul (Thailand) R Prajongjai	5^{r}
Q3	(Canada) C Choi (Canada) J Wu	10	15
(Thailand) P Supajirakul (Thailand) S Taerattanachai	21	21
7	(China) Du Y (China) Li YH	21	21
(Russia) E Bolotova (Russia) A Davletova	14	12
(Bulgaria) G Stoeva (Bulgaria) S Stoeva	21	21
Q1	(Hong Kong) Ng S Y (Hong Kong) Yau M Y	14	11

Second Round
1	(Japan) M Matsumoto (Japan) W Nagahara	21	21
(Thailand) P Supajirakul (Thailand) S Taerattanachai	14	19
7	(China) Du Y (China) Li YH	21	21
(Bulgaria) G Stoeva (Bulgaria) S Stoeva	16	11

Quarter-finals
1	(Japan) M Matsumoto (Japan) W Nagahara	21	21
7	(China) Du Y (China) Li YH	19	18

==== Section 2 ====
First Round
4	(Japan) M Matsutomo (Japan) A Takahashi	21	21
PFQ	(Chinese Taipei) Cheng C-y (Chinese Taipei) Lee C-c	14	14
(Netherlands) S Piek (Netherlands) C Seinen	21	19	21
PFQ	(Germany) L Efler (Germany) I Herttrich	12	21	12
PFQ	(Indonesia) S F S Ramadhanti (Indonesia) R Sugiarto	21	12	13
(South Korea) Chang Y-n (South Korea) Kim H-r	19	21	21
(Japan) A Sakuramoto (Japan) Y Takahata	21	21
(Indonesia) D D Haris (Indonesia) R A Pradipta	10	13

Second Round
4	(Japan) M Matsutomo (Japan) A Takahashi	21	21
(Netherlands) S Piek (Netherlands) C Seinen	11	8
(South Korea) Chang Y-n (South Korea) Kim H-r	21	21
(Japan) A Sakuramoto (Japan) Y Takahata	17	14

Quarter-finals
4	(Japan) M Matsutomo (Japan) A Takahashi	21	14	17
(South Korea) Chang Y-n (South Korea) Kim H-r	17	21	21

=== Bottom half ===
==== Section 3 ====
First Round
(Denmark) M Fruergaard (Denmark) S Thygesen	21	21
(India) A Ponnappa (India) N. S Reddy	13	12
(China) Li WM (China) Zheng Y	20	21	10
8	(South Korea) Kim S-y (South Korea) Kong H-y	22	15	21
(Chinese Taipei) Hsu Y-c (Chinese Taipei) Hu L-f	16	21	21
(Malaysia) V Hoo K M (Malaysia) Yap C W	21	15	17
Q4	(Hong Kong) Leung Y Y (Hong Kong) Wong C C	16	13
3	(China) Chen QC (China) Jia YF	21	21

Second Round
(Denmark) M Fruergaard (Denmark) S Thygesen	21	22
8	(South Korea) Kim S-y (South Korea) Kong H-y	13	20
(Chinese Taipei) Hsu Y-c (Chinese Taipei) Hu L-f	16	12
3	(China) Chen QC (China) Jia YF	21	21

Quarter-finals
(Denmark) M Fruergaard (Denmark) S Thygesen	20	18
3	(China) Chen QC (China) Jia YF	22	21

==== Section 4 ====
First Round
Q2	(Indonesia) N K M Istirani (Indonesia) T O Kusumah	21	21
(Chinese Taipei) Chang C-h (Chinese Taipei) Yang C-t	16	11
(Malaysia) Chow M K (Malaysia) Lee M Y	16	21	19
5	(South Korea) Lee S-h (South Korea) Shin S-c	21	18	21
(South Korea) Baek H-n (South Korea) Jung K-e	21	21
(China) Liu XX (China) Xia YT	14	11
PFQ	(Hong Kong) Ng T Y (Hong Kong) Yuen S Y	14	14
2	(Japan) Y Fukushima (Japan) S Hirota	21	21

Second Round
Q2	(Indonesia) N K M Istirani (Indonesia) T O Kusumah	13	15
5	(South Korea) Lee S-h (South Korea) Shin S-c	21	21
(South Korea) Baek H-n (South Korea) Jung K-e	21	21
2	(Japan) Y Fukushima (Japan) S Hirota	19	14

Quarter-finals
5	(South Korea) Lee S-h (South Korea) Shin S-c	17	7
(South Korea) Baek H-n (South Korea) Jung K-e	21	21

== Mixed doubles ==
=== Seeds ===
1. (China) Zheng Siwei / Huang Yaqiong (withdrew)
2. (China) Wang Yilü / Huang Dongping (second round)
3. (Thailand) Dechapol Puavaranukroh / Sapsiree Taerattanachai (quarter-finals)
4. (Japan) Yuta Watanabe / Arisa Higashino (champions)
5. (South Korea) Seo Seung-jae / Chae Yoo-jung (quarter-finals)
6. (Malaysia) Chan Peng Soon / Goh Liu Ying (second round)
7. (Indonesia) Praveen Jordan / Melati Daeva Oktavianti (second round)
8. (England) Marcus Ellis / Lauren Smith (withdrew)

=== Finals ===
Semi-finals
(Indonesia) Hafiz Faizal (Indonesia) Gloria Emanuelle Widjaja	16	14
4	(Japan) Yuta Watanabe (Japan) Arisa Higashino	21	21
(Malaysia) Goh Soon Huat (Malaysia) Shevon Jemie Lai	14	18
(China) He Jiting (China) Du Yue	21	21

Final
4	(Japan) Yuta Watanabe (Japan) Arisa Higashino	22	21
(China) He Jiting (China) Du Yue	20	16

=== Top half ===
==== Section 1 ====
First Round
PFQ	(Chinese Taipei) Wang C-l (Chinese Taipei) Cheng C-y	21	8	13
(Indonesia) H Faizal (Indonesia) G E Widjaja	17	21	21
(China) Lu K (China) Chen L	21	23	16
(England) C Adcock (England) G Adcock	17	25	21
7	(Indonesia) P Jordan (Indonesia) M D Oktavianti	15	21	21
Q3	(Chinese Taipei) Yang P-hs (Chinese Taipei) Hu L-f	21	18	13
Q1	(South Korea) Choi S-g (South Korea) Shin S-c	16	13
(Japan) Y Kaneko (Japan) M Matsutomo	21	21

Second Round
(Indonesia) H Faizal (Indonesia) G E Widjaja	21	18	21
(England) C Adcock (England) G Adcock	14	21	11
7	(Indonesia) P Jordan (Indonesia) M D Oktavianti	21	19	16
(Japan) Y Kaneko (Japan) M Matsutomo	13	21	21

Quarter-finals
(Indonesia) H Faizal (Indonesia) G E Widjaja	21	21
(Japan) Y Kaneko (Japan) M Matsutomo	13	14

==== Section 2 ====
First Round
4	(Japan) Y Watanabe (Japan) A Higashino	21	21
Q4	(Hong Kong) Yeung M N (Hong Kong) Ng T Y	9	9
(India) S Rankireddy (India) A Ponnappa	16	21	21
(Thailand) N Phuangphuapet (Thailand) S Amitrapai	21	19	17
5	(South Korea) Seo S-j (South Korea) Chae Y-j	9	21	21
(Germany) M Lamsfuß (Germany) I Herttrich	21	14	14
(Indonesia) T Ahmad (Indonesia) W O Kandow	20	18
(Japan) T Hoki (Japan) W Nagahara	22	21

Second Round
4	(Japan) Y Watanabe (Japan) A Higashino	21	21
(India) S Rankireddy (India) A Ponnappa	19	12
5	(South Korea) Seo S-j (South Korea) Chae Y-j	21	21
(Japan) T Hoki (Japan) W Nagahara	15	13

Quarter-finals
4	(Japan) Y Watanabe (Japan) A Higashino	21	21
5	(South Korea) Seo S-j (South Korea) Chae Y-j	18	19

=== Bottom half ===
==== Section 3 ====
First Round
(Malaysia) Goh S H (Malaysia) S J Lai	21	21
(Netherlands) R Tabeling (Netherlands) S Piek	17	8
PFQ	(Japan) K Gondo (Japan) A Kurihara	21	15	21
PFQ	(Canada) J Hurlburt-Yu (Canada) J Wu	19	21	19
(Malaysia) Tan K M (Malaysia) Lai P J	19	21	19
(Russia) R Alimov (Russia) A Davletova	21	17	21
(India) P Chopra (India) N. S Reddy	10	18
3	(Thailand) D Puavaranukroh (Thailand) S Taerattanachai	21	21

Second Round
(Malaysia) Goh S H (Malaysia) S J Lai	21	21
PFQ	(Japan) K Gondo (Japan) A Kurihara	14	8
(Russia) R Alimov (Russia) A Davletova	27	15	12
3	(Thailand) D Puavaranukroh (Thailand) S Taerattanachai	25	21	21

Quarter-finals
(Malaysia) Goh S H (Malaysia) S J Lai	16	23	21
3	(Thailand) D Puavaranukroh (Thailand) S Taerattanachai	21	21	12

==== Section 4 ====
First Round
(Hong Kong) Tang C M (Hong Kong) Tse Y S	21	21
(Chinese Taipei) Lee J-h (Chinese Taipei) Hsu Y-c	17	11
(Indonesia) R Rivaldy (Indonesia) P H Mentari	16	16
6	(Malaysia) Chan P S (Malaysia) Goh L Y	21	21
(China) He JT (China) Du Y	21	21
Q2	(Chinese Taipei) Lu C-y (Chinese Taipei) Lee C-h	18	10
(Germany) M E Seidel (Germany) L Efler	16	13
2	(China) Wang YL (China) Huang DP	21	21

Second Round
(Hong Kong) Tang C M (Hong Kong) Tse Y S	22	21
6	(Malaysia) Chan P S (Malaysia) Goh L Y	20	15
(China) He JT (China) Du Y	21	21
2	(China) Wang YL (China) Huang DP	18	12

Quarter-finals
(Hong Kong) Tang C M (Hong Kong) Tse Y S	17	17
(China) He JT (China) Du Y	21	21

Preceded by 2019 Fuzhou China Open	BWF World Tour; 2019 BWF season	Succeeded by 2019 Korea Masters
