= 2015 Badminton Asia Junior Championships – Girls' singles =

Tournament details
- Dates: 1 – 5 July 2015
- Edition: 18
- Venue: CPB Badminton and Sports Science Training Center
- Location: Bangkok, Thailand

The girls' singles tournament of the 2015 Badminton Asia Junior Championships was held from July 1 to 5. The defending champions of the last edition was Akane Yamaguchi from Japan. He Bingjiao, Gregoria Mariska and Saena Kawakami were the top 3 seeded this year. He Bingjiao of China emerged as the champion after defeat Pornpawee Chochuwong of Thailand in the finals with the score 21–16, 21–17.

== Seeded ==
1. (China) He Bingjiao (champion)
2. (Indonesia) Gregoria Mariska (3rd round)
3. (Japan) Saena Kawakami (quarter Finals)
4. (Indonesia) Ruselli Hartawan (1st round)
5. (Thailand) Supanida Katethong (3rd round)
6. (China) Chen Yufei (3rd round)
7. (Japan) Natsuki Nidaira (quarter Finals)
8. (Thailand) Pornpawee Chochuwong (final)

== Draw ==
=== Finals ===
Quarterfinals
1	(China) He Bingjiao	21	13	21
7	(Japan) Natsuki Nidaira	7	21	13
(Malaysia) Goh Jin Wei	21	14	21
(Japan) Shiori Saito	18	21	18
8	(Thailand) Pornpawee Chochuwong	23	21
3	(Japan) Saena Kawakami	21	12
(Malaysia) Thinaah Muralitharan	18	13
(Japan) Moe Araki	21	21

Semifinals
1	(China) He Bingjiao	17	21	21
(Malaysia) Goh Jin Wei	21	17	14
8	(Thailand) Pornpawee Chochuwong	21	14	21
(Japan) Moe Araki	13	21	15

Final
1	(China) He Bingjiao	21	21
8	(Thailand) Pornpawee Chochuwong	16	17

=== Top half ===
==== Section 1 ====
First round
1	(China) He BJ
BYE
(Malaysia) Ng QX	13	21	18
(Thailand) C Jucharoen	21	15	21
(South Korea) Shim Y-r	21	21
(Philippines) A Albo	15	14
(Macau) U HK	3	8
(Chinese Taipei) Chen S-y	21	21

Second round
1	(China) He BJ	21	21
(Thailand) C Jucharoen	12	8
(South Korea) Shim Y-r	16	16
(Chinese Taipei) Chen S-y	21	21

Third round
1	(China) He BJ	21	21
(Chinese Taipei) Chen S-y	13	13

==== Section 2 ====
First round
7	(Japan) N Nidaira	21	21
(Vietnam) Nguyen TL	19	17
(Hong Kong) Chow KL	15	17
(India) V Gummadi	21	21
(Turkmenistan) A Klychkova	2	0
(Thailand) K Khongdee	21	21
(Sri Lanka) D Dias	8	6
(Indonesia) M Saraswati	21	21

Second round
7	(Japan) N Nidaira	21	21
(India) V Gummadi	16	12
(Thailand) K Khongdee	21	21
(Indonesia) M Saraswati	14	15

Third round
7	(Japan) N Nidaira	21	21
(Thailand) K Khongdee	10	9

==== Section 3 ====
First round
4	(Indonesia) R Hartawan	14	20
(Malaysia) Goh JW	21	22
(Macau) Chan KL	21	21
(Mongolia) N Bayarsaikhan	5	8
(Nepal) S Shrestha	4	5
(South Korea) Byun S-i	21	21
(Hong Kong) Yeung SY	21	21
(Kazakhstan) D Fakhrutdinova	11	8

Second round
(Malaysia) Goh JW	21	21
(Macau) Chan KL	3	4
(South Korea) Byun S-i	21	21
(Hong Kong) Yeung SY	11	17

Third round
(Malaysia) Goh JW	21	21
(South Korea) Byun S-i	9	10

==== Section 4 ====
First round
5	(Thailand) S Katethong	23	23
(China) Ji ST	21	21
(Iran) P Kamrani	11	10
(Chinese Taipei) Hung Y-t	21	21
(Vietnam) Nguyen TPH	14	16
(Philippines) M Sevilla	21	21
(Japan) S Saito	21	21
(Sri Lanka) D Sankapale	3	6

Second round
5	(Thailand) S Katethong	21	19	21
(Chinese Taipei) Hung Y-t	14	21	16
(Philippines) M Sevilla	9	8
(Japan) S Saito	21	21

Third round
5	(Thailand) S Katethong	6	19
(Japan) S Saito	21	21

=== Bottom half ===
==== Section 5 ====
First round
(Malaysia) Lee YY	21	21
(Hong Kong) Fan KY	9	18
(South Korea) Kim G-e	21	21
(Sri Lanka) W De Silva	12	9
(Indonesia) J Sugiarto	18	16
(Chinese Taipei) Liang T-y	21	21
(Nepal) S Mukhiya	3	4
8	(Thailand) P Chochuwong	21	21

Second round
(Malaysia) Lee YY	21	21
(South Korea) Kim G-e	12	18
(Chinese Taipei) Liang T-y	10	13
8	(Thailand) P Chochuwong	21	21

Third round
(Malaysia) Lee YY	16	14
8	(Thailand) P Chochuwong	21	21

==== Section 6 ====
First round
(Kazakhstan) M Smagulova	5	6
(India) S Kudaravalli	21	21
(Macau) Gong XX	3	4
(China) Chen XX	21	21
(Singapore) Ong RN	20	19
(Philippines) S Barredo	21	21
(Mongolia) D Bulgamaa	1	4
3	(Japan) S Kawakami	21	21

Second round
(India) S Kudaravalli	10	7
(China) Chen XX	21	21
(Philippines) S Barredo	15	9
3	(Japan) S Kawakami	21	21

Third round
(China) Chen XX	11	17
3	(Japan) S Kawakami	21	21

==== Section 7 ====
First round
(Mongolia) O Janchiv	4	2
(Malaysia) T Muralitharan	21	21
(Sri Lanka) T Ratnayaka	21	21
(Turkmenistan) Y Sarkisyan	6	3
(India) S Pardeshi	21	16
(Thailand) T Poopradubsil	23	21
(Vietnam) Pham TK	4	6
6	(China) Chen YF	21	21

Second round
(Malaysia) T Muralitharan	21	21
(Sri Lanka) T Ratnayaka	10	9
(Thailand) T Poopradubsil	15	14
6	(China) Chen YF	21	21

Third round
(Malaysia) T Muralitharan	11
6	(China) Chen YF	8^{r}

==== Section 8 ====
First round
(South Korea) Jang N-r	14	18
(Japan) M Araki	21	21
(Chinese Taipei) Hsu W-c	21	21
(Macau) Ng WC	2	6
(Thailand) S Mingchua	21	21
(Hong Kong) Yau MY	19	18
BYE
2	(Indonesia) G Mariska

Second round
(Japan) M Araki	21	21
(Chinese Taipei) Hsu W-c	16	10
(Thailand) S Mingchua	15	14
2	(Indonesia) G Mariska	21	21

Third round
(Japan) M Araki	21	19	21
2	(Indonesia) G Mariska	14	21	10
