= He Bingjiao =

Chinese badminton player (born 1997)

He Bingjiao 何冰娇
Personal information
- Born: 21 March 1997 (age 29) Suzhou, Jiangsu, China
- Height: 1.69 m (5 ft 7 in)

Sport
- Country: China
- Sport: Badminton
- Handedness: Left
- Coached by: Luo Yigang
- Retired: 13 August 2024

Women's singles
- Career record: 336 wins, 125 losses
- Highest ranking: 5 (15 November 2022)
- BWF profile
Medal record
Women's badminton
Representing China
Olympic Games
Silver medal – second place	2024 Paris	Women's singles
World Championships
Bronze medal – third place	2018 Nanjing	Women's singles
Bronze medal – third place	2021 Huelva	Women's singles
Sudirman Cup
Gold medal – first place	2019 Nanning	Mixed team
Gold medal – first place	2021 Vantaa	Mixed team
Gold medal – first place	2023 Suzhou	Mixed team
Silver medal – second place	2017 Gold Coast	Mixed team
Uber Cup
Gold medal – first place	2020 Aarhus	Women's team
Gold medal – first place	2024 Chengdu	Women's team
Silver medal – second place	2022 Bangkok	Women's team
Bronze medal – third place	2018 Bangkok	Women's team
Asian Games
Silver medal – second place	2018 Jakarta–Palembang	Women's team
Silver medal – second place	2022 Hangzhou	Women's team
Bronze medal – third place	2022 Hangzhou	Women's singles
Asian Championships
Silver medal – second place	2019 Wuhan	Women's singles
Bronze medal – third place	2017 Wuhan	Women's singles
Bronze medal – third place	2024 Ningbo	Women's singles
Asia Mixed Team Championships
Bronze medal – third place	2017 Ho Chi Minh	Mixed team
Asia Team Championships
Gold medal – first place	2016 Hyderabad	Women's team
Silver medal – second place	2018 Alor Setar	Women's team
Youth Olympic Games
Gold medal – first place	2014 Nanjing	Girls' singles
World Junior Championships
Gold medal – first place	2014 Alor Setar	Mixed team
Gold medal – first place	2015 Lima	Mixed team
Silver medal – second place	2014 Alor Setar	Girls' singles
Bronze medal – third place	2013 Bangkok	Girls' singles
Bronze medal – third place	2013 Bangkok	Mixed team
Asian Junior Championships
Gold medal – first place	2013 Kota Kinabalu	Mixed team
Gold medal – first place	2014 Taipei	Mixed team
Gold medal – first place	2015 Bangkok	Girls' singles
Gold medal – first place	2015 Bangkok	Mixed team
Bronze medal – third place	2013 Kota Kinabalu	Girls' singles
Representing (International Olympic Committee) Mixed-NOCs
Youth Olympic Games
Bronze medal – third place	2014 Nanjing	Mixed doubles

He Bingjiao (Chinese: 何冰娇; pinyin: Hé Bīngjiāo; Mandarin pronunciation: [xɤ̌ píŋ.tɕjáʊ]; born 21 March 1997) is a Chinese badminton player. She won the silver medals at the 2024 Summer Olympics and 2019 Asian Championships. She also won the bronze medals at the 2018 and 2021 World Championships, 2017 and 2024 Asian Championships as well at the 2022 Asian Games. She was part of the Chinese winning team at the 2021 and 2023 Sudirman Cup, 2020 and 2024 Uber Cup, and also at the 2016 Asia Team Championships. In addition, she was the gold medalists in the 2014 Summer Youth Olympics.

== Career ==
=== Early career ===
She began to receive intensive badminton training at the Suzhou Junior Sports School, when she was 7 years old. Five years later, she was sent to Nanjing for studies tougher training. The junior already competed in the senior level, and made her senior international debut at the 2013 Vietnam Open. In 2014, she competed at the Summer Youth Olympics, winning a gold medal in the girls' singles and a bronze in the mixed doubles event.

=== 2013–2015 ===
He Bingjiao started playing at international tournaments in 2013 when she was 16 years of age. She reached the semi-finals of the Asian Junior Championships where she was defeated by the Thai Busanan Ongbamrungphan in straight games. She also reached the semi-finals of the World Junior Championships but was defeated by the Japanese Aya Ohori. She won the Vietnam Open by defeating the Indonesian Hera Desi in straight games by just 21 minutes.

At the 2014 World Junior Championships, she avenged her defeat to Aya Ohori in the World Junior Championships last year, beating her in straight games. However she had to settle for a silver medal after she lost to another Japanese Akane Yamaguchi in a tightly contested final match of 3 games 21–14, 18–21, 13–21. Her biggest victory came at the Youth Olympic Games, where she defeated Akane Yamaguchi in yet another difficult match and took revenge of her defeat in World Junior Championships final. She also had a good campaign at the Bitburger Open, where she defeated prominent opponents like Michelle Li and Beiwen Zhang, but finished as runner-up after her defeat against Sun Yu.

In 2015, she won her first title of the year at the China Masters, defeating Hui Xirui. She also got a final spot in the New Zealand Open, but was defeated by Japanese player Saena Kawakami. She suffered a shocking defeat in the quarter-finals of the World Junior Championships by Natsuki Nidaira of Japan. She claimed the Indonesian Masters title later that year, defeating Chen Yufei in straight games in the final. Her victories in the tournament included a biggest surprise against two-time World Championship bronze medalist P. V. Sindhu.

=== 2016 ===
She had one of the greatest tournaments of her career at the Swiss Open, where she defeated world's top players: Ratchanok Intanon, P. V. Sindhu, and Sun Yu to reach the finals. She defeated Wang Yihan in a one-sided final match, 21–16, 21–10, and took revenge of her defeat in the All England against her. She claimed her first Superseries title at the Japan Open, beating Sun Yu in the final. She won the French Open Superseries thereafter, defeating Beiwen Zhang in a very easy final 21–9, 21–9. She defended her title successfully at the Bitburger Open, beating Nitchaon Jindapol in the final. As a result of her outstanding performances, she was qualified for the season-ending Superseries Finals, where she had satisfactory results. Despite losing to Tai Tzu-ying and Sung Ji-hyun, she won against Ratchanok Intanon after Intanon left the match trailing 19–21, 11–10.

=== 2017 ===
She reached the semi-finals of the Asian Championships after a hard battle against Olympic silver medalist P. V. Sindhu in the quarter-finals. However, she lost in the semi-finals against Akane Yamaguchi in straight games, thus winning the bronze medal. She was also the part of the China's Sudirman Cup team that won the silver medal at that tournament after losing to South Korea in the final. At the World Championships in Glasgow, Scotland, she lost to home favorite Kirsty Gilmour in the third round in a thrilling match, 14–21, 21–15, 16–21. She failed to defend her title in Japan after losing to Carolina Marín in the final. She was qualified for the Dubai World Superseries Finals this time too, but lost all the group matches, losing to P. V. Sindhu, Akane Yamaguchi and Sayaka Sato. Therefore, she was denied a semi-final spot.

=== 2018 ===
She reached the final of the Malaysia Open for the first time, but failed to give good fight to Tai Tzu-ying even after she had three game points in the first game. She took her biggest revenge against Tai Tzu-ying in the World Championships, where she defeated her in the quarter-finals in 3 games 21–18, 7–21, 21–13. With this win, she broke Tai Tzu-ying's nearly seven months' unbeatable record which included 31 straight wins. She had to settle for a bronze medal after getting defeated by Carolina Marín in yet another three-game clash, 21–13, 16–21, 13–21.

She competed at the Asian Games, where she lost to Nozomi Okuhara in the round of 16. She had shown her great consistency after reaching the semi-finals of various other tournaments. Although she was qualified, she opted not to take part in the first ever edition of World Tour Finals in her home country China, citing some injury problems she got during her match against Sung Ji-hyun in the Hong Kong Open.

=== 2019 ===
At the India Open, she defeated the defending champion Beiwen Zhang in the quarter-finals and P. V. Sindhu for the fourth straight time in the next round. but lost in the final to Ratchanok Intanon in straight games. This was her first defeat against Intanon. She won a silver medal at the Asian Championships following her defeat against Akane Yamaguchi again. After early losses in Indonesia, Japan and Thailand, she finished as a quarter-finalist in the World Championships losing out to Nozomi Okuhara. She got a title victory in Korea Open in 3 years after her last in 2016. In the final, she defeated Ratchanok Intanon even when she was 4 match points down. She had an upsetting campaign at the World Tour Finals, where she was defeated by Akane Yamaguchi, Chen Yufei and P. V. Sindhu. She led against Sindhu in game one with a huge 18–9 lead, but failed to consolidate that lead, and eventually lost the match 19–21, 19–21.

=== 2020–2021 ===
He Bingjiao competed at the 2020 Summer Olympics as the number eight seed in the women's singles. She finished fourth after being defeated by Chen Yufei in the semi-finals and P. V. Sindhu in the bronze medal match. She was part of the China's winning team at the 2021 Sudirman Cup. She reached the semi-finals of the 2021 World Championships. However, she lost to Tai Tzu-ying in three games 17–21, 21–13, 14–21, so she settled for a bronze medal, her second ever medal at the World Championships.

=== 2022 ===
She started the 2022 season by winning the German Open and the Korea Masters, defeating compatriot Chen Yufei in both finals. Then in October, she claimed back-to-back Super 750 titles, winning the Denmark Open and the French Open. As a result of her good performance this season, she qualified for the World Tour Finals, where she topped the group by beating Tai Tzu-ying, Ratchanok Intanon and Busanan Ongbamrungphan to reach the semi-finals for the first time in her career. However, she was outpowered by Tai Tzu-ying in straight games. Despite this, she still reached a career-high ranking of No.5 at the end of the year.

=== 2024 ===
After clinching the women's singles silver medal at the 2024 Summer Olympics, she retired from international badminton on 13 August 2024. She was commended for her sportsmanship during the Olympics, notably during the semifinals whilst playing Carolina Marin, where her opponent injured herself during the second game at 10-5, where Marin was winning. She comforted Marin and gave her practice shots for the next two points before Marin retired. At the victory ceremony, she brought a Spanish flag pin to pay respect to her semi-final opponent.

== Achievements ==
=== Olympic Games ===
Women's singles
Year	Venue	Opponent	Score	Result
2024	Porte de La Chapelle Arena, Paris, France	(South Korea) An Se-young	13–21, 16–21	Silver

=== World Championships ===
Women's singles
Year	Venue	Opponent	Score	Result
2018	Nanjing Youth Olympic Sports Park, Nanjing, China	(Spain) Carolina Marín	21–13, 16–21, 13–21	Bronze
2021	Palacio de los Deportes Carolina Marín, Huelva, Spain	(Chinese Taipei) Tai Tzu-ying	17–21, 21–13, 14–21	Bronze

=== Asian Games ===
Women's singles
Year	Venue	Opponent	Score	Result
2022	Binjiang Gymnasium, Hangzhou, China	(South Korea) An Se-young	10–21, 13–21	Bronze

=== Asian Championships ===
Women's singles
Year	Venue	Opponent	Score	Result
2017	Wuhan Sports Center Gymnasium, Wuhan, China	(Japan) Akane Yamaguchi	15–21, 19–21	Bronze
2019	Wuhan Sports Center Gymnasium, Wuhan, China	(Japan) Akane Yamaguchi	19–21, 9–21	Silver
2024	Ningbo Olympic Sports Center Gymnasium, Ningbo, China	(China) Wang Zhiyi	19–21, 17–21	Bronze

=== Youth Olympic Games ===
Girls' singles
Year	Venue	Opponent	Score	Result
2014	Nanjing Sport Institute, Nanjing, China	(Japan) Akane Yamaguchi	22–24, 23–21, 21–17	Gold

Mixed doubles
Year	Venue	Partner	Opponent	Score	Result
2014	Nanjing Sport Institute; Nanjing, China	(Sri Lanka) Sachin Dias	(Thailand) Mek Narongrit (China) Qin Jinjing	21–16, 21–18	Bronze

=== World Junior Championships ===
Girls' singles
Year	Venue	Opponent	Score	Result
2013	Hua Mark Indoor Stadium, Bangkok, Thailand	(Japan) Aya Ohori	16–21, 17–21	Bronze
2014	Stadium Sultan Abdul Halim, Alor Setar, Malaysia	(Japan) Akane Yamaguchi	21–14, 18–21, 13–21	Silver

=== Asian Junior Championships ===
Girls' singles
Year	Venue	Opponent	Score	Result
2013	Likas Indoor Stadium, Kota Kinabalu, Malaysia	(Thailand) Busanan Ongbamrungphan	16–21, 17–21	Bronze
2015	CPB Badminton Training Center, Bangkok, Thailand	(Thailand) Pornpawee Chochuwong	21–16, 21–17	Gold

=== BWF World Tour (5 titles, 4 runners-up) ===
The BWF World Tour, which was announced on 19 March 2017 and implemented in 2018, is a series of elite badminton tournaments sanctioned by the Badminton World Federation (BWF). The BWF World Tour is divided into levels of World Tour Finals, Super 1000, Super 750, Super 500, Super 300 (part of the HSBC World Tour), and the BWF Tour Super 100.

Women's singles
Year	Tournament	Level	Opponent	Score	Result
2018	Malaysia Open	Super 750	(Chinese Taipei) Tai Tzu-ying	20–22, 11–21	(silver) Runner-up
2019	India Open	Super 500	(Thailand) Ratchanok Intanon	15–21, 14–21	(silver) Runner-up
2019	Korea Open	Super 500	(Thailand) Ratchanok Intanon	18–21, 24–22, 21–17	(gold) Winner
2022	German Open	Super 300	(China) Chen Yufei	21–14, 27–25	(gold) Winner
2022	Korea Masters	Super 300	(China) Chen Yufei	21–14, 14–21, 21–9	(gold) Winner
2022	Denmark Open	Super 750	(China) Chen Yufei	22–20, 12–21, 21–10	(gold) Winner
2022	French Open	Super 750	(Spain) Carolina Marín	16–21, 21–9, 22–20	(gold) Winner
2023	Thailand Open	Super 500	(South Korea) An Se-young	10–21, 19–21	(silver) Runner-up
2023	Japan Open	Super 750	(South Korea) An Se-young	15–21, 11–21	(silver) Runner-up

=== BWF Superseries (2 titles, 1 runner-up) ===
The BWF Superseries, which was launched on 14 December 2006 and implemented in 2007, was a series of elite badminton tournaments, sanctioned by the Badminton World Federation (BWF). BWF Superseries levels were Superseries and Superseries Premier. A season of Superseries consisted of twelve tournaments around the world that had been introduced since 2011. Successful players were invited to the Superseries Finals, which were held at the end of each year.

Women's singles
Year	Tournament	Opponent	Score	Result
2016	Japan Open	(China) Sun Yu	21–14, 7–21, 21–18	(gold) Winner
2016	French Open	(United States) Beiwen Zhang	21–9, 21–9	(gold) Winner
2017	Japan Open	(Spain) Carolina Marín	21–23, 12–21	(silver) Runner-up

BWF Super Series Finals tournament
BWF Super Series Premier tournament
BWF Super Series tournament

=== BWF Grand Prix (5 titles, 2 runners-up) ===
The BWF Grand Prix had two levels, the Grand Prix and Grand Prix Gold. It was a series of badminton tournaments sanctioned by the Badminton World Federation (BWF) and played between 2007 and 2017.

Women's singles
Year	Tournament	Opponent	Score	Result
2013	Vietnam Open	(Indonesia) Hera Desi	21–10, 21–6	(gold) Winner
2014	Bitburger Open	(China) Sun Yu	21–16, 15–21, 12–21	(silver) Runner-up
2015	China Masters	(China) Hui Xirui	21–13, 21–9	(gold) Winner
2015	New Zealand Open	(Japan) Saena Kawakami	16–21, 18–21	(silver) Runner-up
2015	Indonesian Masters	(China) Chen Yufei	21–18, 21–9	(gold) Winner
2016	Swiss Open	(China) Wang Yihan	21–16, 21–10	(gold) Winner
2016	Bitburger Open	(Thailand) Nitchaon Jindapol	21–11, 21–18	(gold) Winner

BWF Grand Prix Gold tournament
BWF Grand Prix tournament

== Performance timeline ==
Key

W	Won	F	Finalist	SF	Semi-finalist
QF	Quarter-finalist	#R	Rounds 4, 3, 2, 1	RR	Round-robin stage
Q#	Qualification round	A	Absent	w/d	Withdrew
G	Gold	S	Silver	B	Bronze
NH	Not held	N/A	Not applicable	DNQ	Did not qualify

=== National team ===
- Junior level

Team events	2013	2014	2015
World Junior Championships	B	G	G
Asian Junior Championships	G	G	G

- Senior level

Team events	2016	2017	2018	2019	2020	2021	2022	2023	2024
Uber Cup	A	NH	B	NH	G	NH	S	NH	G
Sudirman Cup	NH	S	NH	G	NH	G	NH	G	NH
Asian Games	NH		S	NH			S	NH	
Asian Team Championships	G	NH	S	NH	A	NH	A	NH	A
Asian Mixed Team Championships	NH	B	NH	A	NH			A	NH

=== Individual competitions ===
==== Junior level ====
- Girls' singles

Events	2013	2014	2015
Youth Olympic Games	NH	G	NH
World Junior Championships	B	S	QF
Asian Junior Championships	B	QF	G

- Mixed doubles

Events	2014
Youth Olympic Games	B

==== Senior level ====
- Women's singles

Tournaments	2017	2018	2019	2020	2021	2022	2023	2024
Olympic Games	NH			SF	NH			S
World Championships	3R	B	QF	NH	B	3R	3R	NH
Asian Games	NH	2R	NH			B	NH	
Asian Championships	B	QF	S	NH		QF	QF	B

Tournaments	2013	2014	2015	2016	2017	2018	2019	2020	2021	2022	2023	2024
Year-end Final	A			RR	RR	A	RR	A		SF	A	
All England Open	A			2R	2R	1R	QF	2R	A	QF	QF	QF
Denmark Open	A			1R	2R	SF	1R	A	SF	W	QF	
French Open	A			W	SF	SF	QF	NH	A	W	SF	QF
Indonesia Masters	A		W	A	NH	SF	SF	SF	A	SF	2R	SF
Indonesia Open	A			2R	1R	SF	2R	NH	A	SF	QF	QF
Malaysia Open	A			1R	1R	F	QF	NH		1R	1R	QF
China Open	2R	wd	A	QF	QF	QF	QF	NH			QF	
China Masters	A		W	QF	A	SF	QF	NH			QF	
Japan Open	A			W	F	A	2R	NH		2R	F	A
Malaysia Masters	A			2R	A	QF	QF	SF	NH	1R	A	
Singapore Open	A			SF	2R	A		NH		2R	QF	2R
Korea Open	A			2R	SF	A	W	NH		A	2R	A
Thailand Open	A	NH	QF	A			2R	A	NH	QF	F	A
Hong Kong Open	A				QF	QF	QF	NH			A	
India Open	A						F	NH		A	SF	QF
Korea Masters	SF	A					2R	NH		W	A	
German Open	A							NH		W	SF	A
Australian Open	A			2R	2R	A		NH		A		
Taipei Open	A	2R	A	SF	A			NH		A		
Hylo Open	A	F	A	W	A							
Macau Open	A	1R	SF	A				NH				A
New Zealand Open	A		F	A				NH				
Swiss Open	A			W	A			NH	A			
Syed Modi International	NH	A		2R	A			NH		A		
Vietnam Open	W	A						NH		A		
China International	NH	A	2R	A				NH			A	

== Record against selected opponents ==
Record against year-end Finals finalists, World Championships semi-finalists, and Olympic quarter-finalists. Accurate as of 22 December 2025.

Players	Matches	Results		Difference
Players	Matches	Won	Lost	Difference
(China) Chen Yufei	16	8	8	0
(China) Han Yue	8	8	0	+8
(China) Li Xuerui	5	3	2	+1
(China) Wang Shixian	3	0	3	–3
(China) Wang Yihan	2	1	1	0
(China) Wang Zhiyi	8	3	5	–2
(China) Zhang Yiman	5	5	0	+5
(Chinese Taipei) Tai Tzu-ying	21	4	17	–13
(Hong Kong) Yip Pui Yin	4	4	0	+4
(India) Saina Nehwal	3	1	2	–1
(India) P. V. Sindhu	21	12	9	+3
(Indonesia) Gregoria Mariska Tunjung	6	4	2	+2

Players	Matches	Results		Difference
Players	Matches	Won	Lost	Difference
(Indonesia) Putri Kusuma Wardani	4	4	0	+4
(Japan) Minatsu Mitani	3	1	2	–1
(Japan) Aya Ohori	9	8	1	+7
(Japan) Nozomi Okuhara	14	5	9	–4
(Japan) Akane Yamaguchi	17	4	13	–9
(South Korea) An Se-young	14	5	9	–4
(South Korea) Bae Yeon-ju	2	0	2	–2
(South Korea) Sung Ji-hyun	10	5	5	0
(Spain) Carolina Marín	10	3	7	–4
(Thailand) Porntip Buranaprasertsuk	2	2	0	+2
(Thailand) Ratchanok Intanon	7	6	1	+5
