= Nitchaon Jindapol =

Thai badminton player

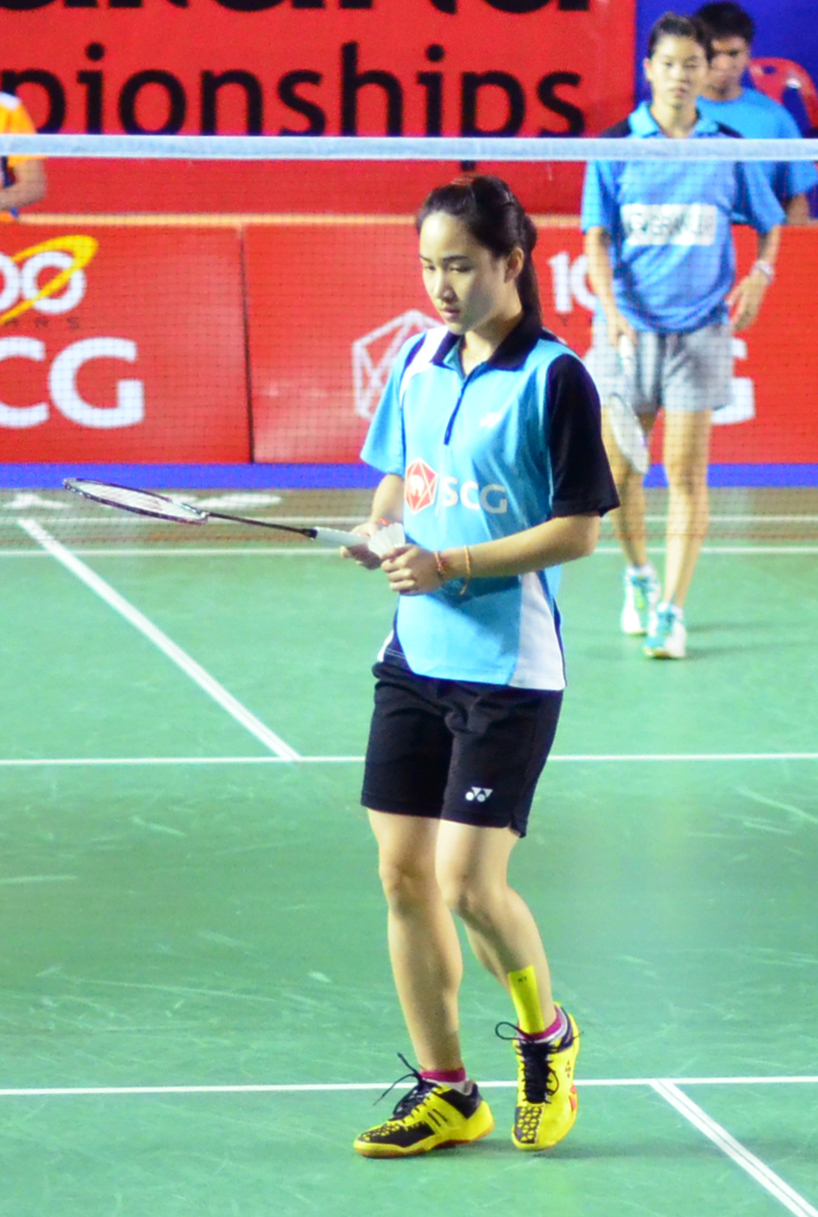

Personal information
- Nickname: Natt
- Born: Nitchaon Jindapol; 31 March 1991 (age 35) Phuket, Thailand
- Height: 1.63 m (5 ft 4 in)

Sport
- Country: Thailand
- Sport: Badminton

Women's singles
- Career record: 231 wins, 169 losses
- Highest ranking: 10 (19 April 2018)
- BWF profile
Medal record
Women's badminton
Representing Thailand
Sudirman Cup
Bronze medal – third place	2013 Kuala Lumpur	Mixed team
Bronze medal – third place	2017 Gold Coast	Mixed team
Uber Cup
Silver medal – second place	2018 Bangkok	Women's team
Bronze medal – third place	2012 Wuhan	Women's team
Asian Games
Silver medal – second place	2010 Guangzhou	Women's team
Bronze medal – third place	2018 Jakarta–Palembang	Women's team
Asia Mixed Team Championships
Bronze medal – third place	2017 Ho Chi Minh	Mixed team
Asia Team Championships
Bronze medal – third place	2020 Manila	Women's team
SEA Games
Gold medal – first place	2011 Jakarta–Palembang	Women's team
Gold medal – first place	2015 Singapore	Women's team
Gold medal – first place	2017 Kuala Lumpur	Women's team
Gold medal – first place	2019 Philippines	Women's team
Bronze medal – third place	2013 Naypyidaw	Women's singles
Bronze medal – third place	2019 Philippines	Women's singles
Summer Universiade
Bronze medal – third place	2011 Shenzhen	Mixed team
World Junior Championships
Bronze medal – third place	2009 Alor Setar	Mixed team

Nitchaon Jindapol (Thai: ณิชชาอร จินดาพล; born 31 March 1991) is a Thai badminton singles player. She was a member of the national women's team which finished as runners-up at the 2010 Asian Games. She graduated at the Sripatum University with a Bachelor of Business Administration.

== Achievements ==
=== SEA Games ===
Women's singles
Year	Venue	Opponent	Score	Result
2013	Wunna Theikdi Indoor Stadium; Naypyidaw, Myanmar	(Indonesia) Bellaetrix Manuputty	17–21, 22–20, 20–22	Bronze
2019	Muntinlupa Sports Complex, Metro Manila, Philippines	(Malaysia) Kisona Selvaduray	21–11, 25–27, 14–21	Bronze

=== BWF World Tour (1 title) ===
The BWF World Tour, which was announced on 19 March 2017 and implemented in 2018, is a series of elite badminton tournaments sanctioned by the Badminton World Federation (BWF). The BWF World Tours are divided into levels of World Tour Finals, Super 1000, Super 750, Super 500, Super 300, and the BWF Tour Super 100 (part of the BWF HSBC World Tour).

Women's singles
Year	Tournament	Level	Opponent	Score	Result
2018	Thailand Masters	Super 300	(Thailand) Pornpawee Chochuwong	21–11, 21–18	(gold) Winner

=== BWF Grand Prix (3 titles, 2 runners-up) ===
The BWF Grand Prix had two levels, the Grand Prix and Grand Prix Gold. It was a series of badminton tournaments sanctioned by the Badminton World Federation (BWF) and played between 2007 and 2017.

Women's singles
Year	Tournament	Opponent	Score	Result
2013	Australian Open	(Japan) Sayaka Takahashi	22–24, 10–21	(silver) Runner-up
2013	Canada Open	(Hong Kong) Yip Pui Yin	21–18, 21–16	(gold) Winner
2013	Bitburger Open	(Bulgaria) Linda Zechiri	21–13, 21–13	(gold) Winner
2016	Bitburger Open	(China) He Bingjiao	11–21, 18–21	(silver) Runner-up
2017	Bitburger Open	(United States) Beiwen Zhang	21–17, 15–21, 21–19	(gold) Winner

BWF Grand Prix Gold tournament
BWF Grand Prix tournament

=== BWF International Challenge/Series (4 titles) ===
Women's singles
Year	Tournament	Opponent	Score	Result
2010	Lao International	(Japan) Nozomi Okuhara	21–16, 21–17	(gold) Winner
2012	Vietnam International	(Japan) Ayumi Mine	17–21, 21–11, 21–19	(gold) Winner
2015	Swiss International	(Germany) Olga Konon	16–21, 21–16, 21–14	(gold) Winner
2015	Bahrain International Challenge	(India) Saili Rane	24–22, 21–10	(gold) Winner

BWF International Challenge tournament
BWF International Series tournament

== Career overview ==
Singles	Played	Wins	Losses	Balance
Total	400	231	169	+62
Current year (2021)	0	0	0	0

Doubles	Played	Wins	Losses	Balance
Total	19	9	10	-1
Current year (2021)	0	0	0	0

* Statistics were last updated on 18 February 2020.

=== Performance timeline ===
Key

W	Won	F	Finalist	SF	Semi-finalist
QF	Quarter-finalist	#R	Rounds 4, 3, 2, 1	RR	Round-robin stage
Q#	Qualification round	A	Absent	w/d	Withdrew
G	Gold	S	Silver	B	Bronze
NH	Not held	N/A	Not applicable	DNQ	Did not qualify

Events	2010	2011	2012	2013	2014	2015	2016	2017	2018	2019	2020	2021
SEA Games	NH	A	NH	B	NH	QF	NH	A	NH	B	NH	
Asian Championships	1R	1R	2R	2R	1R	2R	2R	QF	2R	1R	NH	
Asian Games	A	NH			2R	NH			QF	NH		
World Championships	A		NH	A	2R	A	NH	A	3R	2R	NH	A

Tournament	BWF Superseries / Grand Prix									BWF World Tour			Best
Tournament	2009	2010	2011	2012	2013	2014	2015	2016	2017	2018	2019	2020	Best
Malaysia Masters	A	1R	1R	A	2R	A				2R	1R	2R	2R (2013, 2018, 2020)
Indonesia Masters	NH	A	QF	A				SF	NH	2R	2R	1R	SF (2016)
Thailand Masters	NH							QF	SF	W	2R	A	W (2018)
German Open	A					SF	1R	1R	QF	SF	2R	NH	SF (2014, 2018)
All England Open	A				2R	1R	1R	1R	1R	2R	1R	1R	2R (2013, 2018)
Swiss Open	A						QF	1R	A			NH	QF (2015)
Singapore Open	A				1R	1R	1R	2R	1R	SF	1R	NH	SF (2018)
Australian Open	A			2R	F	2R	1R	A			SF	NH	F (2013)
U.S. Open	A				SF	1R	A					NH	SF (2013)
Canada Open	A				W	A						NH	W (2013)
Vietnam Open		QF	A	1R	A		2R	A				NH	QF (2010)
Chinese Taipei Open	A	1R	A				2R	SF	A		QF	NH	SF (2016)
Korea Open	A				QF	2R	A		2R	A	2R	NH	QF (2013)
China Open	A		Q2	1R	A			1R	A	2R	1R	NH	2R (2018)
Japan Open	A		Q1	2R	A	2R	w/d	1R	1R	A	QF	NH	QF (2019)
Denmark Open	A			2R	A			1R	2R	1R	1R	A	2R (2012, 2017)
French Open	A			2R	1R	A	2R	2R	1R	1R	1R	NH	2R (2012, 2015, 2016)
Macau Open	Q1	A	1R	A	1R	2R	A				2R	NH	2R (2014, 2019)
Bitburger Open	A				W	A		F	W	A			W (2013, 2017)
Fuzhou China Open	A				1R	A				1R	2R	NH	2R (2019)
Hong Kong Open	A			1R	1R	A	w/d	2R	1R	1R	2R	NH	2R (2016, 2019)
Indonesia Open	A				1R	SF	1R	A	SF	1R	QF	NH	SF (2014, 2017)
Syed Modi International	A	1R	A	QF	NH	A	SF	SF	A			NH	SF (2015, 2016)
Malaysia Open	A					QF	1R	1R	2R	2R	1R	NH	QF (2014)
Korea Masters	N/A	2R	A				w/d	A	SF	QF	1R	NH	SF (2017)
India Open	A		1R	2R	QF	2R	A	1R	A		1R	NH	QF (2013)
Thailand Open	SF	NH	Q2	1R	QF	NH	1R	SF	QF	1R	2R	w/d	SF (2009, 2016)
Thailand Open	SF	NH	Q2	1R	QF	NH	1R	SF	QF	1R	2R	w/d	SF (2009, 2016)
Dutch Open	A						QF	A				NH	QF (2015)
Mexico City Grand Prix	NH						2R	NH					2R (2015)
U.S. Grand Prix	NH					A	SF	N/A					SF (2015)

== Record against selected opponents ==
Record against year-end Finals finalists, World Championships semi finalists, and Olympic quarter finalists. Accurate as of 18 February 2020.

Player	Matches	Win	Lost	Diff.
(China) Chen Yufei	6	0	6	–6
(China) He Bingjiao	7	1	6	–5
(China) Li Xuerui	4	0	4	–4
(China) Wang Shixian	3	0	3	–3
(China) Wang Yihan	2	1	1	0
(Chinese Taipei) Cheng Shao-chieh	1	1	0	+1
(Chinese Taipei) Tai Tzu-ying	9	1	8	–7
(Denmark) Tine Baun	1	0	1	–1
(France) Pi Hongyan	1	0	1	–1
(Germany) Juliane Schenk	3	1	2	–1
(Hong Kong) Yip Pui Yin	5	3	2	+1
(India) Saina Nehwal	9	1	8	–7

Player	Matches	Win	Lost	Diff.
(India) P. V. Sindhu	7	2	5	–3
(Indonesia) Lindaweni Fanetri	5	3	2	+1
(Indonesia) Maria Kristin Yulianti	1	0	1	–1
(Japan) Minatsu Mitani	3	0	3	–3
(Japan) Nozomi Okuhara	8	1	7	–6
(Japan) Akane Yamaguchi	6	0	6	–6
(South Korea) Bae Yeon-ju	7	2	5	–3
(South Korea) Sung Ji-hyun	13	3	10	–7
(Spain) Carolina Marín	6	1	5	–4
(Thailand) Porntip Buranaprasertsuk	3	1	2	–1
(Thailand) Ratchanok Intanon	11	1	10	–9
