= Badminton at the 2013 SEA Games – Women's singles =

These are the results of the Women's singles competition in badminton at the 2013 SEA Games in Myanmar.

== Medal winners ==
(gold) Gold	(silver) Silver	(bronze) Bronze
(Indonesia) Bellaetrix Manuputty	(Thailand) Busanan Ongbamrungphan	(Thailand) Nitchaon Jindapol (Vietnam) Vũ Thị Trang

== Draw ==
First round
1	(Thailand) Nitchaon Jindapol
Bye
(Myanmar) Khine Zar Lin	20	11
(Vietnam) Lê Thu Huyền	22	21
(Indonesia) Bellaetrix Manuputty	21	21
(Singapore) Gu Juan	13	17
(Malaysia) Yang Li Lian	21	21
(Laos) Manivone Merngchalern	5	12
(Singapore) Chen Jiayuan	21	21
(Cambodia) Pechhoravy Ker	2	7
(Vietnam) Vũ Thị Trang	21	21
(Laos) Phetmany Keophiachanh	9	5
(Myanmar) Thet Htar Thuzar	13	6
(Indonesia) Aprilia Yuswandari	21	21
(Malaysia) Lim Chiew Sien	10	12
2	(Thailand) Busanan Ongbamrungphan	21	21

Quarterfinals
1	(Thailand) Nitchaon Jindapol	21	21
(Vietnam) Lê Thu Huyền	10	10
(Indonesia) Bellaetrix Manuputty	21	21
(Malaysia) Yang Li Lian	16	15
(Singapore) Chen Jiayuan	19	21	17
(Vietnam) Vũ Thị Trang	21	18	21
(Indonesia) Aprilia Yuswandari	11	18
2	(Thailand) Busanan Ongbamrungphan	21	21

Semifinals
1	(Thailand) Nitchaon Jindapol	17	22	20
(Indonesia) Bellaetrix Manuputty	21	20	22
(Vietnam) Vũ Thị Trang	11	18
2	(Thailand) Busanan Ongbamrungphan	21	21

Finals
(Indonesia) Bellaetrix Manuputty	9	21	21
2	(Thailand) Busanan Ongbamrungphan	21	13	13
