= Vũ Thị Trang =

Vietnamese badminton player (born 1992)

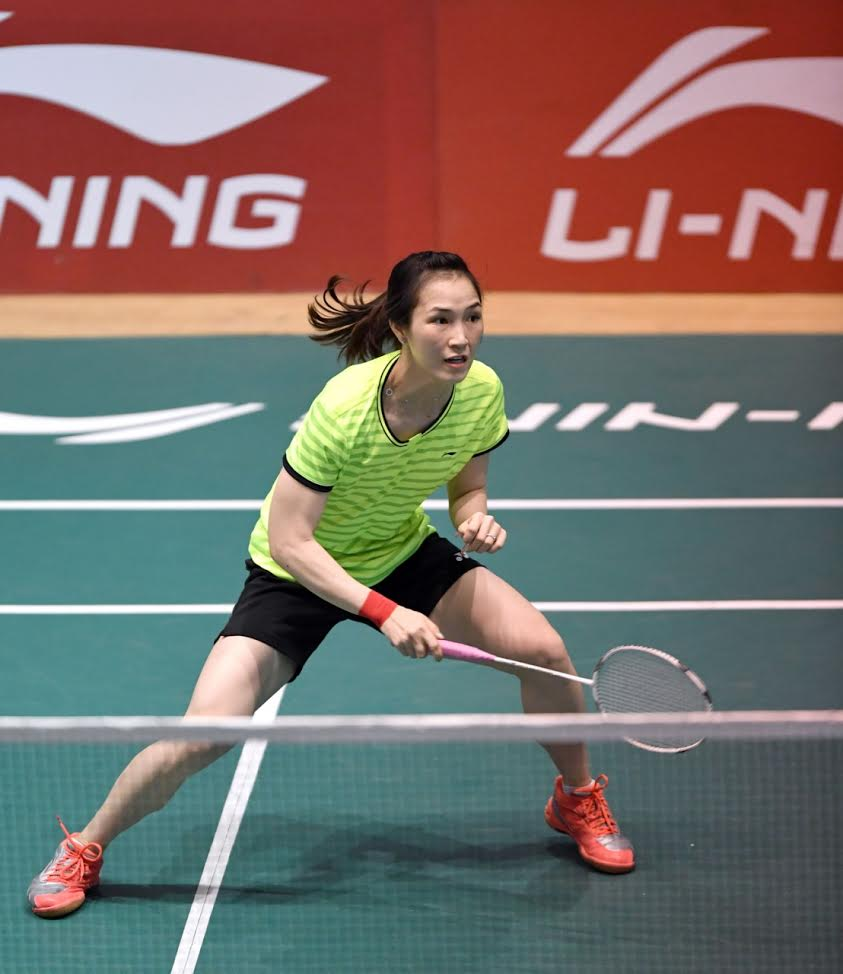

Personal information
- Born: 19 May 1992 (age 34) Lạng Giang, Bắc Giang, Vietnam
- Height: 1.65 m (5 ft 5 in)

Sport
- Country: Vietnam
- Sport: Badminton
- Handedness: Right

Women's singles & doubles
- Highest ranking: 34 (WS, 8 June 2017); 53 (WD with Nguyễn Thị Sen, 23 March 2017)
- Current ranking: 93 (WS, 10 November 2026)
- BWF profile
Medal record
Women's badminton
Representing Vietnam
SEA Games
Bronze medal – third place	2013 Naypyidaw	Women's singles
Bronze medal – third place	2015 Singapore	Women's singles
Bronze medal – third place	2021 Vietnam	Women's team
Bronze medal – third place	2025 Thailand	Women's doubles
Youth Olympic Games
Bronze medal – third place	2010 Singapore	Girls' singles

Vũ Thị Trang (born 19 May 1992) is a badminton player from Vietnam. She competed at the 2016 Summer Olympics in Rio de Janeiro, Brazil. She was a bronze medallist at the 2010 Youth Olympic Games in Singapore.

In 2016, Vũ married fellow Vietnam badminton Olympian Nguyễn Tiến Minh.

== Achievements ==
=== SEA Games ===
Women's singles
Year	Venue	Opponent	Score	Result
2013	Wunna Theikdi Indoor Stadium, Naypyidaw, Myanmar	(Thailand) Busanan Ongbamrungphan	11–21, 18–21	Bronze
2015	Singapore Indoor Stadium, Singapore	(Thailand) Busanan Ongbamrungphan	11–21, 17–21	Bronze

Women's doubles
Year	Venue	Partner	Opponent	Score	Result
2025	Gymnasium 4, Thammasat University Rangsit Campus; Pathum Thani, Thailand	(Vietnam) Bùi Bích Phương	(Indonesia) Febriana Dwipuji Kusuma (Indonesia) Meilysa Trias Puspita Sari	10–21, 9–21	Bronze

=== Youth Olympic Games ===
Girls' singles
Year	Venue	Opponent	Score	Result
2010	Singapore Indoor Stadium, Singapore	(United Kingdom) Sarah Milne	21–15, 22–20	Bronze

=== BWF Grand Prix (1 runner-up) ===
The BWF Grand Prix had two levels, the Grand Prix and Grand Prix Gold. It was a series of badminton tournaments sanctioned by the Badminton World Federation (BWF) and played between 2007 and 2017.

Women's singles
Year	Tournament	Opponent	Score	Result
2017	Vietnam Open	(Japan) Sayaka Takahashi	9–21, 14–21	(silver) Runner-up

BWF Grand Prix Gold tournament
BWF Grand Prix tournament

=== BWF International Challenge/Series (14 titles, 3 runners-up) ===
Women's singles
Year	Tournament	Opponent	Score	Result
2014	Vietnam International Series	(Thailand) Supamart Mingchua	21–23, 21–9, 21–8	(gold) Winner
2015	White Nights	(United States) Rong Schafer	21–14, 21–14	(gold) Winner
2016	Waikato International	(Australia) Wendy Chen Hsuan-yu	21–12, 21–15	(gold) Winner
2016	Vietnam International	(Japan) Saena Kawakami	19–21, 21–19, 21–13	(gold) Winner
2016	Bangladesh International	(Vietnam) Nguyễn Thùy Linh	21–18, 21–13	(gold) Winner
2017	Vietnam International	(Thailand) Pornpawee Chochuwong	16–21, 17–21	(silver) Runner-up
2019	Ghana International	(India) Mugdha Agrey	21–10, 21–6	(gold) Winner
2019	Maldives International	(United States) Iris Wang	15–21, 14–21	(silver) Runner-up
2019	Yonex / K&D Graphics International	(Canada) Brittney Tam	21–14, 20–22, 21–11	(gold) Winner
2022	Vietnam International Series	(Vietnam) Nguyễn Thùy Linh	15–21, 10–21	(silver) Runner-up
2025 (I)	Vietnam International Series	(Malaysia) Oo Shan Zi	15–7, 12–15, 17–15	(gold) Winner
2025 (II)	Vietnam International Series	(Thailand) Tonrug Saeheng	21–19, 18–21, 21–11	(gold) Winner
2026	Czech International	(United Arab Emirates) Nurani Ratu Azzahra	21–19, 15–21, 21–16	(gold) Winner
2026	Future Series Nouvelle-Aquitaine	(Bulgaria) Hristomira Popovska	21–6, 21–14	(gold) Winner

Women's doubles
Year	Tournament	Partner	Opponent	Score	Result
2014	Vietnam International Series	(Vietnam) Nguyễn Thị Sen	(Vietnam) Đặng Kim Ngân (Vietnam) Lê Thị Thanh Thủy	22–20, 21–15	(gold) Winner
2016	Vietnam International Series	(Vietnam) Nguyễn Thị Sen	(Malaysia) Lim Yin Loo (Malaysia) Yap Cheng Wen	21–18, 24–22	(gold) Winner
2016	Bangladesh International	(Vietnam) Nguyễn Thị Sen	(India) Meghana Jakkampudi (India) Poorvisha S Ram	21–6, 20–22, 21–11	(gold) Winner

BWF International Challenge tournament
BWF International Series tournament
BWF Future Series tournament
