= Chen Xiaoxin =

Chinese badminton player (born 1998)

Chen Xiaoxin 陈晓欣
Personal information
- Born: 24 April 1998 (age 28) Nanning, Guangxi, China
- Height: 1.70 m (5 ft 7 in)

Sport
- Country: China
- Sport: Badminton
- Handedness: Right

Women's singles
- Career record: 77 wins, 57 losses
- Highest ranking: 16 (30 November 2017)
- BWF profile
Medal record
Women's badminton
Representing China
Asia Team Championships
Silver medal – second place	2018 Alor Setar	Women's team
World Junior Championships
Gold medal – first place	2014 Alor Setar	Mixed team
Asia Junior Championships
Gold medal – first place	2015 Bangkok	Mixed team

Chen Xiaoxin (Chinese: 陈晓欣; born 24 April 1998) is a Chinese badminton player. Chen started playing badminton in 2006, and has won some junior international tournament includes the mixed team event at the 2014 World Junior Championships. She made her first senior international debut at the 2015 Indonesia Masters, and won her first senior title at the 2017 Swiss Open.

== Achievements ==
=== BWF World Tour (1 runner-up) ===
The BWF World Tour, which was announced on 19 March 2017 and implemented in 2018, is a series of elite badminton tournaments sanctioned by the Badminton World Federation (BWF). The BWF World Tour is divided into levels of World Tour Finals, Super 1000, Super 750, Super 500, Super 300 (part of the HSBC World Tour), and the BWF Tour Super 100.

Women's singles
Year	Tournament	Level	Opponent	Score	Result
2018	SaarLorLux Open	Super 100	(China) Cai Yanyan	19–21, 21–19, 17–21	(silver) Runner-up

=== BWF Grand Prix ===
The BWF Grand Prix had two levels, the Grand Prix and Grand Prix Gold. It was a series of badminton tournaments sanctioned by the Badminton World Federation (BWF) and played between 2007 and 2017.

Women's singles
Year	Tournament	Opponent	Score	Result
2016	Macau Open	(China) Chen Yufei	13–21, 18–21	(silver) Runner-up
2017	Swiss Open	(China) Chen Yufei	21–19, 21–14	(gold) Winner

BWF Grand Prix Gold tournament
BWF Grand Prix tournament
