= Pornpawee Chochuwong =

Thai badminton player

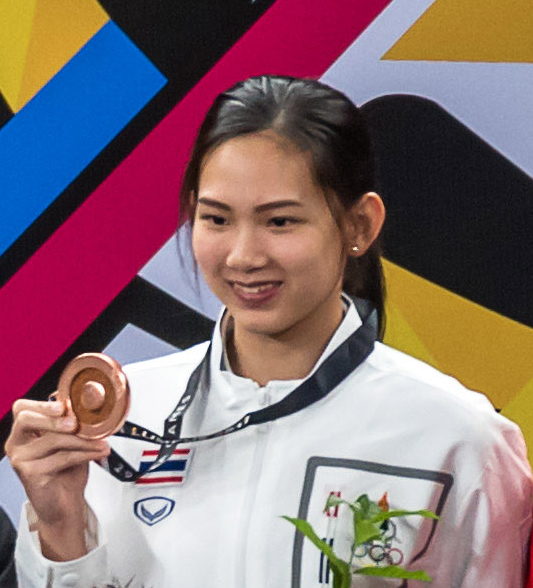
- Pornpawee at the 2017 SEA Games.

Personal information
- Born: 22 January 1998 (age 28) Rayong, Thailand
- Height: 1.70 m (5 ft 7 in)

Sport
- Country: Thailand
- Sport: Badminton
- Handedness: Right

Women's singles
- Highest ranking: 6 (4 February 2025)
- Current ranking: 8 (3 November 2026)
- BWF profile
Medal record
Women's badminton
Representing Thailand
World Championships
Bronze medal – third place	2026 New Delhi	Women's singles
Sudirman Cup
Bronze medal – third place	2017 Gold Coast	Mixed team
Bronze medal – third place	2019 Nanning	Mixed team
Uber Cup
Silver medal – second place	2018 Bangkok	Women's team
Bronze medal – third place	2020 Aarhus	Women's team
Bronze medal – third place	2022 Bangkok	Women's team
Asian Games
Bronze medal – third place	2018 Jakarta–Palembang	Women's team
Bronze medal – third place	2022 Hangzhou	Women's team
Asia Mixed Team Championships
Bronze medal – third place	2017 Ho Chi Minh	Mixed team
Bronze medal – third place	2025 Qingdao	Mixed team
Asia Team Championships
Bronze medal – third place	2016 Hyderabad	Women's team
Bronze medal – third place	2020 Manila	Women's team
SEA Games
Gold medal – first place	2017 Kuala Lumpur	Women's team
Gold medal – first place	2019 Philippines	Women's team
Gold medal – first place	2021 Vietnam	Women's team
Gold medal – first place	2021 Vietnam	Women's singles
Gold medal – first place	2025 Thailand	Women's team
Bronze medal – third place	2017 Kuala Lumpur	Women's singles
Bronze medal – third place	2019 Philippines	Women's singles
World Junior Championships
Silver medal – second place	2016 Bilbao	Girls' singles
Bronze medal – third place	2014 Alor Setar	Mixed team
Bronze medal – third place	2016 Bilbao	Mixed team
Asian Junior Championships
Silver medal – second place	2015 Bangkok	Girls' singles
Bronze medal – third place	2016 Bangkok	Mixed team

Pornpawee Chochuwong (Thai: พรปวีณ์ ช่อชูวงศ์; born 22 January 1998) is a Thai badminton player. She was the girls' singles silver medalist at the 2015 Asian and 2016 World Junior Championships. She was also part of the Thai winning teams at the 2017, 2019 and 2021 SEA Games. Pornpawee won her first World Tour title at the 2020 Spain Masters by beating the reigning Olympic champion Carolina Marín in the final.

== Career ==
=== 2021 ===
Pornpawee reached the finals of the All England Open, but lost to second seeded Nozomi Okuhara of Japan in straight games. She then made her Top 10 debut in the BWF World Rankings on 23 March 2021.

== Achievements ==
=== World Championships ===
Women's singles
Year	Venue	Opponent	Score	Result	Ref.
2026	Indira Gandhi Arena, New Delhi, India	(Japan) Akane Yamaguchi	12–21, 17–21	Bronze	

=== SEA Games ===
Women's singles
Year	Venue	Opponent	Score	Result
2017	Axiata Arena, Kuala Lumpur, Malaysia	(Malaysia) Goh Jin Wei	9–21, 21–10, 18–21	Bronze
2019	Muntinlupa Sports Complex, Metro Manila, Philippines	(Indonesia) Ruselli Hartawan	16–21, 21–10, 18–21	Bronze
2021	Bac Giang Gymnasium, Bắc Giang, Vietnam	(Thailand) Phittayaporn Chaiwan	21–14, 21–16	Gold

=== BWF World Junior Championships ===
Girls' singles
Year	Venue	Opponent	Score	Result
2016	Bilbao Arena, Bilbao, Spain	(China) Chen Yufei	14–21, 17–21	Silver

=== Asian Junior Championships ===
Girls' singles
Year	Venue	Opponent	Score	Result
2015	CPB Badminton Training Center, Bangkok, Thailand	(China) He Bingjiao	16–21, 17–21	Silver

=== BWF World Tour (3 titles, 7 runners-up) ===
The BWF World Tour, which was announced on 19 March 2017 and implemented in 2018, is a series of elite badminton tournaments sanctioned by the Badminton World Federation (BWF). The BWF World Tours are divided into levels of World Tour Finals, Super 1000, Super 750, Super 500, Super 300 (part of the HSBC World Tour), and the BWF Tour Super 100.

Women's singles
Year	Tournament	Level	Opponent	Score	Result
2018	Thailand Masters	Super 300	(Thailand) Nitchaon Jindapol	11–21, 18–21	(silver) Runner-up
2020	Spain Masters	Super 300	(Spain) Carolina Marín	11–21, 21–16, 21–18	(gold) Winner
2021	All England Open	Super 1000	(Japan) Nozomi Okuhara	12–21, 16–21	(silver) Runner-up
2022	Korea Open	Super 500	(South Korea) An Se-young	17–21, 18–21	(silver) Runner-up
2023	Swiss Open	Super 300	(Denmark) Mia Blichfeldt	21–16, 21–18	(gold) Winner
2025	India Open	Super 750	(South Korea) An Se-young	12–21, 9–21	(silver) Runner-up
2025	Thailand Masters	Super 300	(Indonesia) Komang Ayu Cahya Dewi	18–21, 21–16, 21–13	(gold) Winner
2025	Thailand Open	Super 500	(China) Chen Yufei	16–21, 12–21	(silver) Runner-up
2026	Australian Open	Super 500	(Japan) Akane Yamaguchi	20–22, 18–21	(silver) Runner-up
2026	Hong Kong Open	Super 500	(China) Wang Zhiyi	16–21, 11–21	(silver) Runner-up

=== BWF Grand Prix (1 runner-up) ===
The BWF Grand Prix had two levels, the BWF Grand Prix and Grand Prix Gold. It was a series of badminton tournaments sanctioned by the Badminton World Federation (BWF) which was held from 2007 to 2017.

Women's singles
Year	Tournament	Opponent	Score	Result
2017	Malaysia Masters	(India) Saina Nehwal	20–22, 20–22	(silver) Runner-up

BWF Grand Prix Gold tournament
BWF Grand Prix tournament

=== BWF International Challenge/Series (3 titles, 3 runners-up) ===
Women's singles
Year	Tournament	Opponent	Score	Result
2013	Vietnam International	(Indonesia) Hana Ramadhini	14–21, 19–21	(silver) Runner-up
2013	Singapore International	(Thailand) Rawinda Prajongjai	12–21, 14–21	(silver) Runner-up
2015	Kharkiv International	(Germany) Olga Konon	16–21, 10–21	(silver) Runner-up
2015	Sydney International	(Turkey) Özge Bayrak	21–11, 14–21, 21–19	(gold) Winner
2015	India International	(Malaysia) Tee Jing Yi	16–21, 21–11, 21–15	(gold) Winner
2017	Vietnam International	(Vietnam) Vũ Thị Trang	21–16, 21–17	(gold) Winner

BWF International Challenge tournament
BWF International Series tournament

== Record against selected opponents ==
Record against Year-end Finals finalists, World Championships semi-finalists, and Olympic quarter-finalists. Accurate as of 23 December 2025.

Players	Matches	Results		Difference
Players	Matches	Won	Lost	Difference
(China) Chen Yufei	16	1	15	–14
(China) Han Yue	13	4	9	–5
(China) He Bingjiao	17	2	15	–13
(China) Wang Yihan	1	0	1	–1
(China) Wang Zhiyi	6	1	5	–4
(China) Zhang Yiman	1	1	0	+1
(Chinese Taipei) Cheng Shao-chieh	1	1	0	+1
(Chinese Taipei) Tai Tzu-ying	6	2	4	–2
(Hong Kong) Yip Pui Yin	3	2	1	+1
(India) Saina Nehwal	6	1	5	–4
(India) P. V. Sindhu	12	5	7	–2
(Indonesia) Gregoria M Tunjung	8	4	4	0

Players	Matches	Results		Difference
Players	Matches	Won	Lost	Difference
(Indonesia) Putri Kusuma Wardani	10	8	2	+6
(Japan) Minatsu Mitani	1	0	1	–1
(Japan) Aya Ohori	6	5	1	+4
(Japan) Nozomi Okuhara	7	2	5	–3
(Japan) Akane Yamaguchi	17	5	12	–7
(South Korea) An Se-young	12	0	12	–12
(South Korea) Bae Yeon-ju	2	0	2	–2
(South Korea) Sung Ji-hyun	6	2	4	–2
(Spain) Carolina Marín	11	2	9	–7
(Thailand) Porntip Buranaprasertsuk	1	1	0	+1
(Thailand) Ratchanok Intanon	10	4	6	–2
