= 2011 BWF World Junior Championships – girls' singles =

2011 BWF World Junior Championships girls' singles
Tournament details
- Dates: 2 – 6 November 2011
- Edition: 13th
- Level: International
- Venue: Taoyuan Arena
- Location: Taoyuan City, Taiwan

The girls' singles event for the 2011 BWF World Junior Championships was held between 2 November and 6 November. Ratchanok Intanon's historic third title was first for any player across all five disciplines.

== Seeded ==
1. (Thailand) Ratchanok Intanon (champion)
2. (Spain) Carolina Marín (semifinals)
3. (Japan) Nozomi Okuhara (semifinals)
4. (India) P. V. Sindhu (third round)
5. (Indonesia) Elyzabeth Purwaningtyas (final)
6. (Russia) Romina Gabdullina (quarter-finals)
7. (Turkey) Neslihan Yiğit (fourth round)
8. (Malaysia) Soniia Cheah (quarter-finals)
9. (Hong Kong) Cheung Ngan Yi (fourth round)
10. (Vietnam) Lê Thu Huyền (third round)
11. (South Korea) Lee So-hee (third round)
12. (Singapore) Liang Xiaoyu (second round)
13. (Turkey) Cemre Fere (fourth round)
14. (Finland) Airi Mikkelä (third round)
15. (Denmark) Mette Poulsen (third round)
16. (Turkey) Ebru Tunalı (second round)

== Draw ==
=== Finals ===
Quarterfinals
1	(Thailand) Ratchanok Intanon	21	21
(Canada) Christin Tsai	10	15
3/4	(Japan) Nozomi Okuhara	21	24
5/8	(Malaysia) Soniia Cheah	19	22
5/8	(Indonesia) Elyzabeth Purwaningtyas	22	10	21
(Japan) Yuki Fukushima	20	21	19
5/8	(Russia) Romina Gabdullina	14	17
2	(Spain) Carolina Marín	21	21

Semifinals
1	(Thailand) Ratchanok Intanon	21	21
3/4	(Japan) Nozomi Okuhara	16	16
5/8	(Indonesia) Elyzabeth Purwaningtyas	23	17	21
2	(Spain) Carolina Marín	21	21	18

Final
1	(Thailand) Ratchanok Intanon	21	18	21
5/8	(Indonesia) Elyzabeth Purwaningtyas	6	21	13

=== Top half ===
==== Section 1 ====
First round
(United States) E Kan	9	6
(India) T Lad	21	21

Second round
1	(Thailand) R Intanon	21	24
(Japan) A Ohori	19	22
(Denmark) N Rhode	21	14	14
(Russia) E Kosetskaya	18	21	21
9/16	(Finland) A Mikkelä	21	21
(Egypt) R Osman	5	6
(Hong Kong) Tsang WC	9	15
(India) T Lad	21	21

Third round
1	(Thailand) R Intanon	21	21
(Russia) E Kosetskaya	9	2
9/16	(Finland) A Mikkelä	10	11
(India) T Lad	21	21

Fourth round
1	(Thailand) R Intanon	21	21
(India) T Lad	8	5

==== Section 2 ====
First round
(Australia) J Guan	9	15
(Malaysia) Lim YF	21	21
(Canada) C Tsai	21	21
(England) C Birch	9	12

Second round
5/8	(Turkey) N Yiğit	20	21	21
(South Korea) Kim H-M	22	16	17
(Indonesia) R Riodingin	21	21
(Malaysia) Lim YF	8	8
9/16	(Singapore) Liang X	20	14
(Chinese Taipei) Sung S-Y	22	21
(Germany) L Wich	5	10
(Canada) C Tsai	21	21

Third round
5/8	(Turkey) N Yiğit	21	19	21
(Indonesia) R Riodingin	19	21	12
(Chinese Taipei) Sung S-Y	8	16
(Canada) C Tsai	21	21

Fourth round
5/8	(Turkey) N Yiğit	13	12
(Canada) C Tsai	21	21

==== Section 3 ====
First round
(Sri Lanka) T Hendahewa	21	21
(Australia) V Mak	12	12
(Thailand) R Prajongjai	21	21
(Vietnam) Phạm NT	9	16

Second round
3/4	(Japan) N Okuhara	21	21
(Indonesia) H Ramadini	16	13
(India) G Ghate	21	21
(Sri Lanka) T Hendahewa	13	15
9/16	(South Korea) Lee S-H	21	21
(Singapore) F Seah	18	11
(Chinese Taipei) Tang W-Y	21	21
(Thailand) R Prajongjai	19	17

Third round
3/4	(Japan) N Okuhara	21	21
(India) G Ghate	10	18
9/16	(South Korea) Lee S-H	10	17
(Chinese Taipei) Tang W-Y	21	21

Fourth round
3/4	(Japan) N Okuhara	21	22	21
(Chinese Taipei) Tang W-Y	9	24	13

==== Section 4 ====
First round
(Netherlands) G Mahulette	21	21
(Egypt) N Ashraf	13	10
(Mexico) M Ugalde	21	21
(Macau) U T-I	18	11

Second round
5/8	(Malaysia) S Cheah	21	20	21
(Philippines) M Alcala	19	22	9
(United States) J Ye	6	10
(Netherlands) G Mahulette	21	21
9/16	(Hong Kong) Cheung NY	21	21
(France) L Palermo	15	8
(Denmark) S Jensen	21	21
(Mexico) M Ugalde	8	6

Third round
5/8	(Malaysia) S Cheah	21	21
(Netherlands) G Mahulette	13	9
9/16	(Hong Kong) Cheung NY	21	21
(Denmark) S Jensen	11	18

Fourth round
5/8	(Malaysia) S Cheah	21	15	24
9/16	(Hong Kong) Cheung NY	6	21	22

=== Bottom half ===
==== Section 5 ====
First round
(Egypt) T Aya	9	10
(Australia) W Chen	21	21
(Chinese Taipei) Lin Y-C	17	21	21
(Hong Kong) Cheung YM	21	13	10

Second round
(Australia) W Chen	19	21	21
(Sri Lanka) K Sirimannage	21	12	12
(Macau) Ieong P-S	10	5
9/16	(Turkey) C Fere	21	21
(Chinese Taipei) Lin Y-C	17	21	21
(Finland) S Pekkola	21	9	6
(Netherlands) K van der Valk	14	10
5/8	(Indonesia) E Purwaningtyas	21	21

Third round
(Australia) W Chen	21	21	21
9/16	(Turkey) C Fere	15	23	23
(Chinese Taipei) Lin Y-C	9	16
5/8	(Indonesia) E Purwaningtyas	21	21

Fourth round
9/16	(Turkey) C Fere	16	15
5/8	(Indonesia) E Purwaningtyas	21	21

==== Section 6 ====
First round
(Malaysia) Lim CS	11	16
(Thailand) B Ongbamrungphan	21	21
(Germany) R Hacks	21	21
(Czech Republic) J Žwaková	18	19

Second round
(Thailand) B Ongbumrungpan	21	21
(Canada) B So	6	7
(Russia) N Rogova	14	22	10
9/16	(Denmark) M Poulsen	21	20	21
(Germany) R Hacks	8	8
(Japan) Y Fukushima	21	21
(South Korea) Kim Y-J	16	15
3/4	(India) P Sindhu	21	21

Third round
(Thailand) B Ongbamrungphan	21	23
9/16	(Denmark) M Poulsen	15	21
(Japan) Y Fukushima	15	21	23
3/4	(India) P Sindhu	21	18	21

Fourth round
(Thailand) B Ongbamrungphan	21	16	13
(Japan) Y Fukushima	10	21	21

==== Section 7 ====
First round
(Denmark) A Madsen	21	21
(United States) L Tong	5	5
(Malaysia) Yang LL	21	21
(Canada) K Tung	7	14

Second round
(Denmark) A Madsen	12	21	21
(Thailand) M Phattanaphitoon	21	11	17
(France) D Lansac	17	13
9/16	(Vietnam) Lê TH	21	21
(Malaysia) Yang LL	21	23
(South Korea) Han S-Y	19	21
(Singapore) Tan WH	11	14
5/8	(Russia) R Gabdullina	21	21

Third round
(Denmark) A Madsen	21	14	22
9/16	(Vietnam) Lê TH	9	21	20
(Malaysia) Yang LL	21	19	19
5/8	(Russia) R Gabdullina	16	21	21

Fourth round
(Denmark) A Madsen	13	21	19
5/8	(Russia) R Gabdullina	21	14	21

==== Section 8 ====
First round
(Finland) J Nyström	9	15
(Japan) A Sakuramoto	21	21
(Philippines) J De Vera	6	14
(England) E Westwood	21	21

Second round
(Japan) A Sakuramoto	21	21
(Germany) A Dörr	15	19
(Indonesia) Y Y Susanto	20	21	21
9/16	(Turkey) E Tunalı	22	17	9
(England) E Westwood	13	12
(Chinese Taipei) Yu C-H	21	21
(Netherlands) S Eibergen	16	24	14
2	(Spain) C Marín	21	22	21

Third round
(Japan) A Sakuramoto	21	18	14
(Indonesia) Y Y Susanto	16	21	21
(Chinese Taipei) Yu C-H	14	17
2	(Spain) C Marín	21	21

Fourth round
(Indonesia) Y Y Susanto	13	21	8
2	(Spain) C Marín	21	18	21
