= European U17 Badminton Championships =

Badminton championships

The European U17 Badminton Championships is a tournament organized by the Badminton Europe (BE) and is held once every two years to crown the best junior badminton players in Europe. Originally known as Polonia Cup when it first started in 1990, with the current name adopted in 2005. The individual event was first held in 2009.

== Championships ==
There were two experimental tournaments (Polonia Cup) in Strasbourg (1987) and Cádiz (1989) which are considered as unofficial editions.

Year	Number	Host city	Host Country	Events
Polonia Cup (1990–2003)
1990	1	Cetniewo	Poland	1
1991	2	Kristiansand	Norway	1
1992	3	Barcelona	Spain	1
1993	4	Neerpelt	Belgium	1
1995	5	Cardiff	Wales	1
1997	6	Istanbul	Turkey	1
1999	7	Spala	Poland	1
2001	8	Neerpelt	Belgium	1
2003	9	Dublin	Ireland	1
European U17 Badminton Championships (from 2005)
2005	10	Brno	Czech Republic	1
2007	11	Istanbul	Turkey	1
2009	12	Medvode	Slovenia	6
2011	13	Caldas da Rainha	Portugal	6
2014	14	Ankara	Turkey	6
2016	15	Lubin	Poland	6
2017	16	Prague	Czech Republic	6
2019	17	Gniezno	Poland	6
2021	18	Podčetrtek	Slovenia	6
2023	19	Vilnius	Lithuania	6
2025	20	Arrecife	Spain	6

== List of medalists ==
=== Polonia Cup/Team event ===
Year	Gold	Silver	Bronze
1990	Soviet Union	Poland	West Germany
1991	Soviet Union	Poland	Norway
1992	Spain	Belgium	Switzerland
1993	Poland	Switzerland	Norway
1995	Russia	Poland	Wales
1997	Russia	Czech Republic	England
1999	Russia	Poland	Estonia
2001	Russia	Poland	Switzerland
2003	Russia	Poland	Belgium
2005	Denmark	Russia	Spain
2007	Denmark	Ukraine	France
2009	Denmark	Russia	Turkey
2009	Denmark	Russia	Ukraine
2011	Denmark	England	Turkey
2011	Denmark	England	Russia
2014	Denmark	England	Turkey
2014	Denmark	England	France
2016	Denmark	England	Turkey
2016	Denmark	England	France
2017	Denmark	Turkey	England
2017	Denmark	Turkey	Scotland
2019	Denmark	Serbia	Russia
2019	Denmark	Serbia	Ukraine
2021	Russia	France	Czech Republic
2021	Russia	France	Denmark
2023	Denmark	Turkey	Ukraine
2023	Denmark	Turkey	Czech Republic
2025	France	Denmark	Germany
2025	France	Denmark	England

=== Individual event ===
Year	Event	Gold	Silver	Bronze	
2009
2009	MS	(Denmark) Viktor Axelsen	(Denmark) Kim Bruun	(Russia) Anatoliy Yartsev	(Turkey) Emre Lale
2009	WS	(Spain) Carolina Marín	(Turkey) Neslihan Yiğit	(Turkey) Ebru Tunalı	(Denmark) Line Kjærsfeldt
2009	MD	(Denmark) Frederik Colberg (Denmark) Kasper Paulsen	(France) Lucas Corvee (France) Joris Grosjean	(Russia) Ivan Nikitin (Russia) Anatoliy Yartsev	(Denmark) Kasper Antonsen (Denmark) Mathias Mundbjerg
2009	WD	(Denmark) Celine Juel (Denmark) Mette Poulsen	(Turkey) Neslihan Kılıç (Turkey) Neslihan Yiğit	(Bulgaria) Gabriela Stoeva (Bulgaria) Stefani Stoeva	(Denmark) Amanda Madsen (Denmark) Josephine van Zaane
2009	XD	(Denmark) Frederik Colberg (Denmark) Mette Poulsen	(Denmark) Kasper Antonsen (Denmark) Amanda Madsen	(France) Joris Grosjean (France) Léa Palermo	(Wales) Oliver Gwilt (Wales) Georgia Hughes
2011
2011	MS	(England) Alex Lane	(Denmark) Rasmus Gemke	(Germany) Lars Schänzler	(Germany) Fabian Roth
2011	WS	(Bulgaria) Stefani Stoeva	(Denmark) Julie Finne-Ipsen	(Denmark) Anne Katrine Hansen	(France) Delphine Lansac
2011	MD	(Denmark) Viktor Svendsen (Denmark) Mads Sørensen	(Denmark) Patrick Bjerregaard (Denmark) Peter Correll	(France) Tanguy Citron (France) Jordan Corvée	(Sweden) Felix Burestedt (Sweden) Daniel Ojäaar
2011	WD	(Russia) Olga Morozova (Russia) Nataliy Rogova	(England) Jennifer Moore (England) Victoria Williams	(Belgium) Ine Lanckriet (Belgium) Flore Vandenhoucke	(Denmark) Julie Davidsen (Denmark) Maiken Sørensen
2011	XD	(Finland) Iikka Heino (Finland) Mathilda Lindholm	(Russia) Aleksandr Zinchenko (Russia) Olga Morozova	(Germany) Johannes Pistorius (Germany) Jennifer Karnott	(Germany) Marvin Seidel (Germany) Linda Efler
2014
2014	MS	(Denmark) Anders Antonsen	(France) Toma Junior Popov	(Austria) Wolfgang Gnedt	(England) David King
2014	WS	(Germany) Yvonne Li	(England) Ira Banerjee	(Spain) Clara Azurmendi	(Scotland) Julie MacPherson
2014	MD	(England) Matthew Clare (England) Ben Lane	(Russia) Rodion Alimov (Russia) Alexandr Kozyrev	(Germany) Bjarne Geiss (Germany) Daniel Seifert	(Denmark) Joel Eipe (Denmark) Jeppe Bay Madsen
2014	WD	(Croatia) Katarina Galenić (Croatia) Maja Pavlinić	(England) Ira Banerjee (England) Jessica Pugh	(Turkey) Kader İnal (Turkey) Fatma Nur Yavuz	(Denmark) Cecilie Finne-Ipsen (Denmark) Julie Dawall Jakobsen
2014	XD	(England) Ben Lane (England) Jessica Pugh	(Russia) Rodion Alimov (Russia) Alina Davletova	(Turkey) Melih Turgut (Turkey) Fatma Nur Yavuz	(Denmark) Ditlev Jæger Holm (Denmark) Cecilie Finne-Ipsen
2016
2016	MS	(Republic of Ireland) Nhat Nguyen	(England) Johnnie Torjussen	(France) Léo Rossi	(Scotland) Christopher Grimley
2016	WS	(Denmark) Line Christophersen	(Spain) Sara Peñalver	(Hungary) Réka Madarász	(Turkey) Busra Unlu
2016	MD	(Denmark) Paw Eriksen (Denmark) Mads Thøgersen	(France) Thom Gicquel (France) Léo Rossi	(Denmark) Daniel Lundgaard (Denmark) Mads Muurholm Petersen	(Republic of Ireland) Nhat Nguyen (Republic of Ireland) Paul Reynolds
2016	WD	(Denmark) Alexandra Bøje (Denmark) Amalie Magelund Krogh	(Turkey) Bengisu Erçetin (Turkey) Nazlıcan İnci	(Denmark) Sofie Nielsen (Denmark) Freja Ravn	(France) Vimala Hériau (France) Margot Lambert
2016	XD	(Denmark) Alexandra Bøje (Denmark) Paw Eriksen	(Russia) Anastasia Medvedeva (Russia) Mikhail Lavrikov	(Ukraine) Maryna Ilyinskaya (Ukraine) Danylo Bosniuk	(England) Fee Teng Liew (England) Steven Stallwood
2017
2017	MS	(Russia) Georgii Karpov	(Denmark) Magnus Johannesen	(Russia) Georgii Lebedev	(Spain) Tomás Toledano
2017	WS	(Denmark) Sophia Grundtvig	(Russia) Anastasiia Pustinskaia	(Turkey) Zehra Erdem	(Hungary) Vivien Sándorházi
2017	MD	(France) Kenji Lovang (France) Christo Popov	(England) David Hong (England) Ethan van Leeuwen	(Sweden) Jacob Ekman (Sweden) Joel Hansson	(England) Rory Easton (England) Harry Huang
2017	WD	(Turkey) Bengisu Erçetin (Turkey) Zehra Erdem	(Denmark) Christine Busch (Denmark) Amalie Schulz	(Germany) Emma Moszczynski (Germany) Jule Petrikowski	(Sweden) Edith Urell (Sweden) Cecilia Wang
2017	XD	(England) Rory Easton (England) Hope Warner	(Denmark) Sebastian Grønbjerg (Denmark) Clara Graversen	(Germany) Matthias Kicklitz (Germany) Emma Moszczynski	(Scotland) Adam Pringle (Scotland) Rachel Andrew
2019
2019	MS	(Denmark) Mads Møller	(France) Sacha Lévêque	(France) Alex Lanier	(England) Ethan Rose
2019	WS	(Russia) Mariia Golubeva	(Russia) Aleksandra Chushkina	(Denmark) Simona Pilgaard	(Poland) Joanna Podedworny
2019	MD	(Denmark) Christian Kjær (Denmark) Mads Møller	(Russia) Lev Barinov (Russia) Egor Borisov	(Russia) Daniil Dubovenko (Russia) Maksim Ogloblin	(Turkey) Hasan Günbaz (Turkey) Nurullah Saraç
2019	WD	(Russia) Anastasiia Boiarun (Russia) Alena Iakovleva	(England) Estelle van Leeuwen (England) Holly Williams	(Turkey) Yasemen Bektaş (Turkey) Cansu Erçetin	(Denmark) Simona Pilgaard (Denmark) Anna Ryberg
2019	XD	(Denmark) Christopher Vittoriani (Denmark) Mette Werge	(Russia) Lev Barinov (Russia) Anastasiia Boiarun	(Denmark) William Kryger Boe (Denmark) Emilia Nesic	(England) Cholan Kayan (England) Holly Williams
2021
2021	MS	(France) Alex Lanier	(Denmark) William Bøgebjerg	(Belgium) Charles Fouyn	(Sweden) Romeo Makboul
2021	WS	(Bulgaria) Kaloyana Nalbantova	(Poland) Joanna Podedworny	(Ukraine) Sofiia Lavrova	(Ukraine) Yevheniia Kantemyr
2021	MD	(France) Baptiste Labarthe (France) Alex Lanier	(Russia) Daniil Dubovenko (Russia) Gleb Stepakov	(Denmark) Jonathan Melgaard (Denmark) Mike Vestergaard	(Turkey) Anil Ulac Atan (Turkey) Mirac Kantar
2021	WD	(Russia) Daria Kharlompovich (Russia) Galina Lisochkina	(Russia) Maria Lezzhova (Russia) Galina Mezentseva	(Bulgaria) Kaloyana Nalbantova (Bulgaria) Tsetina Popivanova	(France) Molya Hoareau (France) Camille Pognante
2021	XD	(Denmark) Jonathan Melgaard (Denmark) Maria Højlund Tommerup	(Ukraine) Yevhenni Stolovoi (Ukraine) Yevheniia Kantemyr	(England) Oliver Butler (England) Chloe Dennis	(Serbia) Viktor Petrovic (Serbia) Andjela Vitman
2023
2023	MS	(Denmark) Salomon Thomasen	(Portugal) Tiago Berenguer	(Ukraine) Ivan Tsaregorotsev	(France) Arthur Chardain
2023	WS	(Ukraine) Anastasiia Alymova	(Germany) Katharina Nilges	(Wales) Saffron Morris	(Netherlands) Flora Wang
2023	MD	(France) Timéo Lacour (France) Arsène Serre	(Poland) Mikołaj Morawski (Poland) Krzysztof Podkowiński	(Denmark) Jens Andersson (Denmark) Jesper Christensen	(France) Ewan Goulin (France) Swann Hardi
2023	WD	(Ukraine) Raiia Almalalha (Ukraine) Anastasiia Alymova	(Denmark) Caroline Mouritsen (Denmark) Nicoline Tang	(Switzerland) Gaëlle Fux (Switzerland) Anic Metzger	(Republic of Ireland) Siofra Flynn (Republic of Ireland) Michelle Shochan
2023	XD	(France) Ewan Goulin (France) Agathe Cuevas	(Denmark) Jesper Christensen (Denmark) Caroline Mouritsen	(Romania) Luca-Ștefan Pandele (Romania) Denisa-Maria Muscalu	(Turkey) Gökay Göl (Turkey) Nisanur Çimen
2025
2025	MS	(France) Mady Sow	(France) Lenny Hubert	(Denmark) Maximilian Ørding Kauffmann	(France) Clément Massias
2025	WS	(England) Rajvi Parab	(Ukraine) Varvara Poperezhai	(Belgium) Léa Dauphinais	(Wales) Ishasriya Mekala
2025	MD	(France) Rayan Benaissa (France) Mady Sow	(Denmark) Maximilian Ørding Kauffmann (Denmark) Birk Norman	(England) Yixiang Hou (England) Jasper Wong	(England) George Clare (England) Sajan Senthuran
2025	WD	(France) Mélia Beulé (France) Manon Heitzmann	(England) Mia Fox (England) Rajvi Parab	(Turkey) Irmak Rana Yemişen (Turkey) Yağmur Tuana Yemişen	(Ukraine) Mariia Aleksandrova (Ukraine) Sofiia Nikolayeva
2025	XD	(France) Rayan Benaissa (France) Manon Heitzmann	(France) Lenny Hubert (France) Mélia Beulé	(Denmark) Elias Martin (Denmark) Rosa Rasmussen	(Denmark) Birk Norman (Denmark) Sophia Loudrup

== Medal count (1990 - 2025) ==
Rank	Nation	Gold	Silver	Bronze	Total
1	Denmark (DEN)	25	13	18	56
2	Russia (RUS)	12	12	6	30
3	France (FRA)	10	6	13	29
4	England (ENG)	5	10	11	26
5	Ukraine (UKR)	2	3	8	13
6	Spain (ESP)	2	1	3	6
7	Bulgaria (BUL)	2	0	2	4
8	Poland (POL)	1	8	1	10
9	Turkey (TUR)	1	5	15	21
10	Germany (GER)	1	1	9	11
11	Ireland (IRL)	1	0	2	3
12	Croatia (CRO)	1	0	0	1
12	Finland (FIN)	1	0	0	1
14	Belgium (BEL)	0	1	4	5
15	Switzerland (SUI)	0	1	3	4
16	Czech Republic (CZE)	0	1	1	2
16	Serbia (SRB)	0	1	1	2
18	Portugal (POR)	0	1	0	1
19	Scotland (SCO)	0	0	4	4
19	Sweden (SWE)	0	0	4	4
19	Wales (WAL)	0	0	4	4
22	Hungary (HUN)	0	0	2	2
22	Norway (NOR)	0	0	2	2
24	Austria (AUT)	0	0	1	1
24	Estonia (EST)	0	0	1	1
24	Netherlands (NED)	0	0	1	1
24	Romania (ROM)	0	0	1	1
Totals (27 entries)		64	64	117	245

* Russian medals included medals won by the USSR
* German medals included medals won by West Germany
