= 2021 European U17 Badminton Championships =

Tournament details
- Dates: 3–12 September 2021
- Location: Podčetrtek, Slovenia

The 2021 European U17 Badminton Championships took place in Podčetrtek, Slovenia between 3 and 12 September 2021. The championships was composed of two parts: the team championship, and the 5 disciplines of the individual championships. The event was organized by Badminton Europe with the Badminton Association of Slovenia as the host organiser.

== Medals ==
=== Medal summary ===
Team Championships

Event	Gold	Silver	Bronze
Mixed team	Russia; Daniil Dubovenko; Daria Kharlampovich; Maria Lezzhova; Galina Lisochkina; Galina Mezentseva; Georgii Petrov; Gleb Stepakov; Ilio Vesnovskiy	France; Herveline Crespel; Malya Hoareau; Matteo Justel; Baptiste Labarthe; Alex Lanier; Floriane Nurit; Camille Pognante	Czech Republic; Daniel Dvořák; Vojtěch Havlíček; Patrik Hrazíra; Kristina Kozempelová; Lucie Krulová; Petra Maixnerová; Jan Jan Rázl
Mixed team	Russia; Daniil Dubovenko; Daria Kharlampovich; Maria Lezzhova; Galina Lisochkina; Galina Mezentseva; Georgii Petrov; Gleb Stepakov; Ilio Vesnovskiy	France; Herveline Crespel; Malya Hoareau; Matteo Justel; Baptiste Labarthe; Alex Lanier; Floriane Nurit; Camille Pognante	Denmark; William Bøgebjerg; Kajsa van Dalm; Calvin Lundsgaard; Jonathan Melgaard; Sofie Røjkjær; Lærke Thomsen; Maria Højlund Tommerup; Mike Vestergaard

Individual events

Event	Gold	Silver	Bronze
Men's singles	Alex Lanier; France	William Bøgebjerg; Denmark	Charles Fouyn; Belgium
Men's singles	Alex Lanier; France	William Bøgebjerg; Denmark	Romeo Makboul; Sweden
Women's singles	Kaloyana Nalbantova; Bulgaria	Joanna Podedworny; Poland	Yevheniia Kantemyr; Ukraine
Women's singles	Kaloyana Nalbantova; Bulgaria	Joanna Podedworny; Poland	Sofiia Lavrova; Ukraine
Men's doubles	France; Baptiste Labarthe; Alex Lanier	Russia; Daniil Dubovenko; Gleb Stepakov	Denmark; Jonathan Melgaard; Mike Vestergaard
Men's doubles	France; Baptiste Labarthe; Alex Lanier	Russia; Daniil Dubovenko; Gleb Stepakov	Turkey; Anil Ulaç Atan; Miraç Kantar
Women's doubles	Russia; Daria Kharlampovich; Galina Lisochkina	Russia; Maria Lezzhova; Galina Mezentseva	Bulgaria; Kaloyana Nalbantova; Tsvetina Popivanova
Women's doubles	Russia; Daria Kharlampovich; Galina Lisochkina	Russia; Maria Lezzhova; Galina Mezentseva	France; Malya Hoareau; Camille Pognante
Mixed doubles	Denmark; Jonathan Melgaard; Maria Højlund Tommerup	Ukraine; Yevhenii Stolovoi; Yevheniia Kantemyr	England; Oliver Butler; Chloe Dennis
Mixed doubles	Denmark; Jonathan Melgaard; Maria Højlund Tommerup	Ukraine; Yevhenii Stolovoi; Yevheniia Kantemyr	Serbia; Viktor Petrovic; Andjela Vitman

=== Medal table ===
* Host nation (Slovenia)

Rank	Nation	Gold	Silver	Bronze	Total
1	Russia	2	2	0	4
2	France	2	1	1	4
3	Denmark	1	1	2	4
4	Bulgaria	1	0	1	2
5	Ukraine	0	1	2	3
6	Poland	0	1	0	1
7	Belgium	0	0	1	1
7	Czech Republic	0	0	1	1
7	England	0	0	1	1
7	Serbia	0	0	1	1
7	Sweden	0	0	1	1
7	Turkey	0	0	1	1
Totals (12 entries)		6	6	12	24
