= 2009 European U17 Badminton Championships =

The 2009 European U17 Badminton Championships were held in Medvode, Slovenia, between November 11 and November 15, 2009.

== Medalists ==
Event	Gold	Silver	Bronze
Men's singles	(Denmark) Viktor Axelsen	(Denmark) Kim Bruun	(Russia) Anatoliy Yartsev
Men's singles	(Denmark) Viktor Axelsen	(Denmark) Kim Bruun	(Turkey) Emre Lale
Women's singles	(Spain) Carolina Marín	(Turkey) Neslihan Yiğit	(Turkey) Ebru Tunalı
Women's singles	(Spain) Carolina Marín	(Turkey) Neslihan Yiğit	(Denmark) Line Kjærsfeldt
Men's doubles	(Denmark) Frederik Colberg and Kasper Paulsen	(France) Lucas Corvee and Joris Grosjean	(Russia) Ivan Nikitin and Anatoliy Yartsev
Men's doubles	(Denmark) Frederik Colberg and Kasper Paulsen	(France) Lucas Corvee and Joris Grosjean	(Denmark) Kasper Antonsen and Mathias Mundbjerg
Women's doubles	(Denmark) Celine Juel and Mette Poulsen	(Turkey) Neslihan Kılıç and Neslihan Yiğit	(Bulgaria) Gabriela Stoeva and Stefani Stoeva
Women's doubles	(Denmark) Celine Juel and Mette Poulsen	(Turkey) Neslihan Kılıç and Neslihan Yiğit	(Denmark) Amanda Madsen and Josephine Van Zaane
Mixed doubles	(Denmark) Frederik Colberg and Mette Poulsen	(Denmark) Kasper Antonsen and Amanda Madsen	(France) Joris Grosjean and Lea Palermo
Mixed doubles	(Denmark) Frederik Colberg and Mette Poulsen	(Denmark) Kasper Antonsen and Amanda Madsen	(Wales) Oliver Gwilt and Georgia Hughes
