= Nozomi Okuhara =

Japanese badminton player (born 1995)

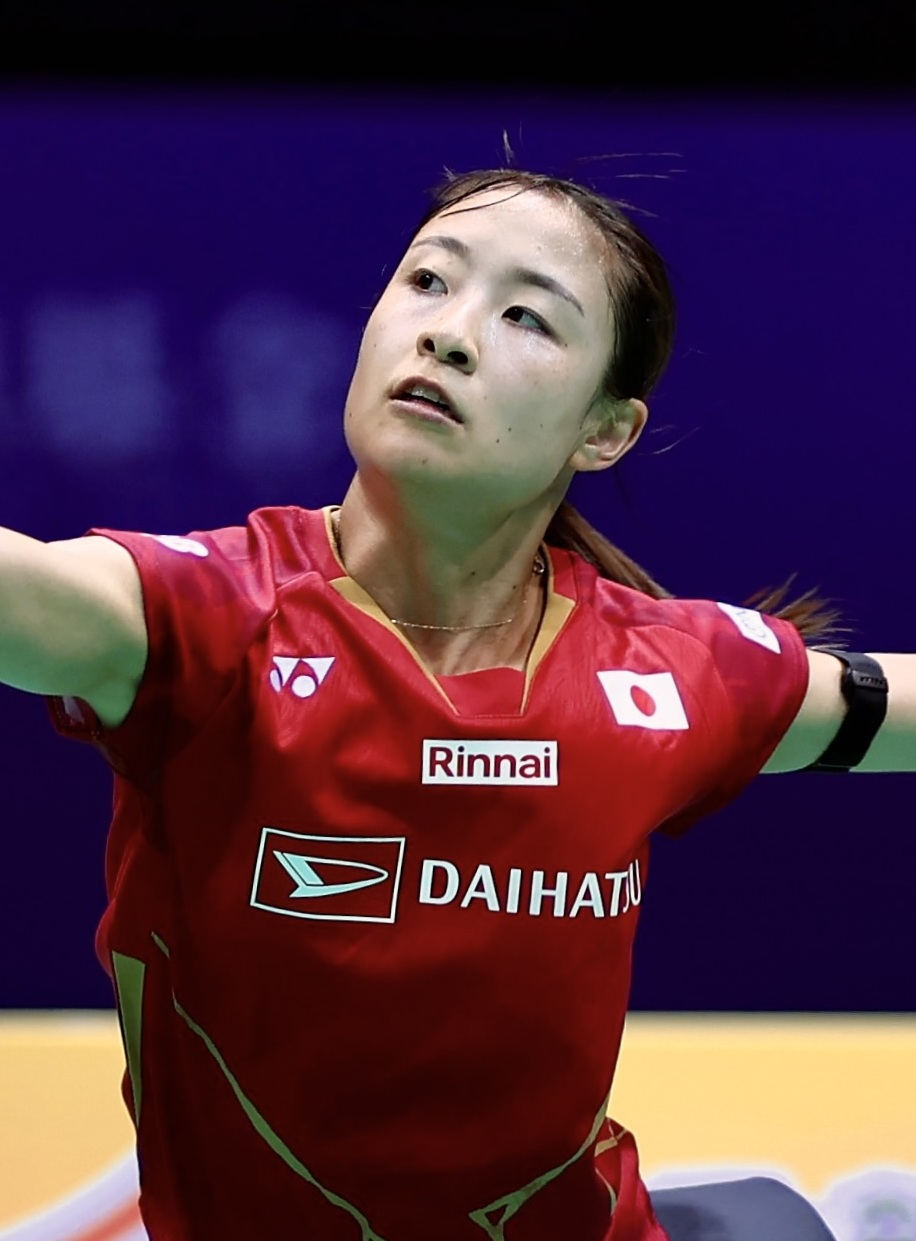
- Okuhara at the 2025 Kaohsiung Masters

Personal information
- Born: 13 March 1995 (age 31) Ōmachi, Nagano, Japan
- Height: 1.56 m (5 ft 1 in)
- Weight: 52 kg (115 lb)

Sport
- Country: Japan
- Sport: Badminton
- Handedness: Right

Women's singles
- Career record: 439 wins, 164 losses
- Highest ranking: 1 (29 October 2019)
- Current ranking: 10 (3 November 2026)
- BWF profile
Medal record
Women's badminton
Representing Japan
Olympic Games
Bronze medal – third place	2016 Rio de Janeiro	Women's singles
World Championships
Gold medal – first place	2017 Glasgow	Women's singles
Silver medal – second place	2019 Basel	Women's singles
Sudirman Cup
Silver medal – second place	2015 Dongguan	Mixed team
Silver medal – second place	2019 Nanning	Mixed team
Bronze medal – third place	2017 Gold Coast	Mixed team
Uber Cup
Gold medal – first place	2018 Bangkok	Women's team
Bronze medal – third place	2016 Kunshan	Women's team
Bronze medal – third place	2022 Bangkok	Women's team
Bronze medal – third place	2024 Chengdu	Women's team
Asian Games
Gold medal – first place	2018 Jakarta–Palembang	Women's team
Silver medal – second place	2026 Aichi–Nagoya	Women's team
Asia Team Championships
Gold medal – first place	2018 Alor Setar	Women's team
Silver medal – second place	2016 Hyderabad	Women's team
Bronze medal – third place	2024 Selangor	Women's team
World Junior Championships
Gold medal – first place	2012 Chiba	Girls' singles
Silver medal – second place	2012 Chiba	Mixed team
Bronze medal – third place	2011 Taipei	Girls' singles
Asian Junior Championships
Gold medal – first place	2012 Gimcheon	Mixed team
Silver medal – second place	2012 Gimcheon	Girls' singles

Nozomi Okuhara (奥原 希望, Okuhara Nozomi; born 13 March 1995) is a Japanese badminton player. A former World's number 1 in the BWF rankings for the women's singles, she is well known for her speed, agility and endurance. She won a bronze at the 2016 Summer Olympics, and gold medal at the 2017 World Championships.

== Career ==
Okuhara started playing badminton in 2002. Eight years later, in 2010, she joined the Japanese national team. The 2010 Osaka International Challenge became her international debut.

=== 2010–2012 ===
In 2010, Okuhara reached the final of Lao International which she lost to Nitchaon Jindapol. The 16-year-old Okuhara became the youngest women's singles champion ever at the Japanese National Championships in 2011. Additionally, she won the Austrian title by defeating her teammate Mayu Sekiya and a bronze medal at World Junior Championships.

Okuhara was a runner-up at the Asian Junior Championships, and helped her team in winning the mixed team title. She later clinched the gold medal at the World Junior Championships, having won bronze one year earlier at the 2011 BWF World Junior Championships. In July, she won her first Grand Prix title at the Canada Open.

=== 2013–2014 ===
Okuhara's progress was temporarily halted in 2013 when she suffered a knee injury during a quarterfinal match against Saina Nehwal at the Malaysia Open. The injury sidelined her from the international circuit for nearly a year. She returned to elite competition in November 2013 at the China Premier event. In 2014, Okuhara claimed titles at the New Zealand Open, the Vietnam Open and Korean Grand Prix. She reached her first Super Series final at the Hong Kong Open later that year; after defeating reigning World Champion Carolina Marín in the semifinals, she finished as the runner-up to Tai Tzu-ying.

=== 2015 ===
Okuhara won two Grand Prix Gold titles at Malaysia and United States. In both occasions, she got the better of her compatriots Sayaka Takahashi and Sayaka Sato respectively. She also won China International event. At the Malaysian Superseries event, she played the longest ever Women's singles match against Wang Shixian in quarterfinal which lasted for whopping 111 minutes. Okuhara lost that match and was cramping heavily at the end. Scorecard was 21–19, 15–21, 20–22 in favour of Shixian. She won her first Superseries title at Japan Open in the final defeating her colleague Akane Yamaguchi with score of 21–18, 21–12. At the World Championships in Jakarta seeded 9th, she failed to get past Thai Porntip Buranaprasertsuk in 1st round having lost to her twice before. Just like previous season, Okuhara again reached the final of Hong Kong Open. She lost a very difficult encounter to Carolina Marín there, a contest of 3 games with very tight scoreline. At the end of the 2015 BWF season, she won the Dubai World Superseries final. On her path through without dropping a single game, she defeated all of her opponents namely Saina Nehwal, Tai Tzu-ying and top seed Carolina Marín. She defeated Marín twice, first in the preliminary round and again in semifinals with very one-sided scores. In the final she beat Wang Yihan 22–20, 21–18.

=== 2016–2017 ===
In 2016, she won the prestigious All England Open on her Birthday after defeating Wang Shixian in the final with score 21–11, 16–21, 21–19, and thereby became the first Japanese women's singles player to lift this title in 39 years since Hiroe Yuki's triumph back in 1977. She was seeded 6th for Rio Olympic Games. She defeated Akane Yamaguchi in quarterfinal 11–21, 21–17, 21–10 and reached the semis. Her opponent for semifinal was No. 9 seed P. V. Sindhu. Okuhara had no answers to Indian's attacking play and she went down in 2-straight games 19–21, 10–21. In the bronze medal match she was given walkover against Li Xuerui of China as her opponent was injured. In the process, she became Japan's first ever Badminton Women's singles player to win an Olympic medal. In the China Superseries in November, she developed shoulder issues which forced her to withdraw from Hong Kong Open and her chance of defending the Dubai Superseries Finals title was thwarted.

In 2017, Okuhara claimed her first ever Australian Open title with a win over Akane Yamaguchi. Continuing her good form, she participated at the World Championships seeded 7th. After defeating Canada's Rachel Honderich and teammate Aya Ohori, she had an uphill task against Carolina Marín of Spain in the quarterfinals. She beat Marín, the two-time reigning Champion in a gruelling battle of an hour and 33 minutes. She also claimed hard-fought victory over Saina Nehwal in the semifinals, having lost the opening game. For the final, she faced opposition from P. V. Sindhu. She managed to edge a 21–19, 20–22, 22–20 victory over the Indian in one of the classics of Badminton history. Match stretched for 1:50 hours, making it the 2nd longest match in Women's singles badminton ever. Ironically enough, the longest one was also played by Okuhara; in 2015 against Shixian at the Malaysian Superseries, which she lost. With Okuhara's victory, she became the first ever Japanese to win the World title since 1977. After her triumph at the World stage, she also reached the final of Korean Open Premier Superseries, in which P. V. Sindhu managed to beat Okuhara. However afterwards she suffered knee injury and her performance dipped. She opted not to participate at the Dubai Superseries Finals, so as not to aggravate her knee problems.

=== 2018 ===
In May, Okuhara helped Japan to win the Uber Cup again after 37 years. Japan beat Thailand by 3–0 in the final and Okuhara didn't lose any of her matches. She went to World Championships in Nanjing as defending champion but lost to the player she beat in the 2017 final, P. V. Sindhu, in 2 straight games in the quarter-finals. She won her first ever World Tour Title, the Thailand Open Super 500 by defeating P. V. Sindhu 21–15 and 18. In addition, she reached five more finals and won 2 of them in Korea and Hong Kong, both Super 500 events. Her final finishes were in Japan Super 750 (lost to Carolina Marín) Fuzhou Super 750 events (lost to Chen Yufei) and World Tour Finals in Guangzhou to P. V. Sindhu.

=== 2019–20 ===
Okuhara reached the final of Singapore Open, but lost it to Tai Tzu-ying. Also, she reached the final of Australia Open & Japan Open but lost to Chen Yufei and Akane Yamaguchi respectively. In the World Championships, she was seeded 3rd. She defeated He Bingjiao and Ratchanok Intanon; reached the final of this tournament once more and set her encounter with P. V. Sindhu. In a repeat clash of 2017 World Championships final, she was defeated 7–21, 7–21 by the Indian player, henceforth settled for the silver medal. She succeeded in occupying the Ranking 1 of the world shifting Tai Tzu-ying on 29 October 2019. She also contested the Denmark Open final, which she lost to Tai Tzu-ying with 17–21, 14–21 scores. She was the runner-up in 6th straight tournament, after her defeat in the hands of Chen Yufei in Fuzhou China Open with the scores 21–9, 12–21, 18–21. She took part in World Tour Finals in Guangzhou where she had best of starts; defeating all her opponents of group stage. But in semi finals, she was beaten by Tai Tzu-ying whom she has beaten in group stage earlier. Okuhara won 2020 Denmark Open tournament after surpassing 3rd seed Carolina Marín in 2 games with scores 21–19, 21–17. This was the first time in 2 years that she won a World Tour title since her last at Hong Kong Open in 2018.

=== 2021–2022 ===
She won her second England Open title after her last in 2016 by beating Pornpawee Chochuwong from Thailand. She defeated her opponent in two games 21–12, 21–16. Okuhara qualified for another Olympics in Tokyo but she lost in quarter finals to He Bingjiao with scoreline of 21–13, 13–21, 14–21. In 2022, Okuhara did not win a single tournament in which her best finishes only in semifinals of Hylo Open where she lost to Zhang Yiman. After her withdrawal from 2021 BWF World Championships in second round the previous year, Okuhara missed the whole tournament again in 2022 due to injury.

=== 2023–2025 ===
In 2023, Okuhara claimed two World Tour titles late in the year at the Syed Modi International and the Odisha Masters. During the Odisha Masters, she experienced a severe logistical incident involving local transportation that delayed her arrival at the arena, prompting formal apologies from the Badminton Association of India. The following year, she reached the final of the 2024 Indonesia Masters, finishing as the runner-up to Wang Zhiyi.

In 2025, Her performance was poor in early season as she bounced out early in All England Open against Sindhu. As the season progress, she became more consistent and reached three quarterfinals in Canada Open, Macau Open and the first Indonesia Masters Super 100. In October, Okuhara had a great streak of winning 3 straight titles in S100 - Kaohsiung Masters, Malaysia Super 100 and the second Indonesia Masters Super 100.

=== 2026 ===
Okuhara started the first quarter of the season with two semifinals bout in Indonesia Masters and Swiss Open. In March, Okuhara won her first title of the season at the Orléans Masters, beating Pitchamon Opatniputh in the final. In April, Okuhara competed at the Asian Championships in Ningbo, China. She defeated Pornpawee Chochuwong in the second round before being eliminated in the quarter-finals by Sim Yu-jin.

In October, Okuhara reached the semifinals of the Denmark Open, where she lost to eventual champion An Se-young.

== Achievements ==
=== Olympic Games ===
Women's singles
Year	Venue	Opponent	Score	Result	Ref.
2016	Riocentro – Pavilion 4, Rio de Janeiro, Brazil	(China) Li Xuerui	Walkover	Bronze	

=== World Championships ===
Women's singles
Year	Venue	Opponent	Score	Result	Ref.
2017	Emirates Arena, Glasgow, Scotland	(India) P. V. Sindhu	21–19, 20–22, 22–20	Gold	
2019	St. Jakobshalle, Basel, Switzerland	(India) P. V. Sindhu	7–21, 7–21	Silver	

=== World Junior Championships ===
Girls' singles
Year	Venue	Opponent	Score	Result	Ref.
2011	Taoyuan Arena, Taoyuan, Taiwan	(Thailand) Ratchanok Intanon	16–21, 16–21	Bronze	
2012	Chiba Port Arena, Chiba, Japan	(Japan) Akane Yamaguchi	21–12, 21–9	Gold	

=== Asian Junior Championships ===
Girls' singles
Year	Venue	Opponent	Score	Result	Ref.
2012	Gimcheon Indoor Stadium, Gimcheon, South Korea	(India) P. V. Sindhu	21–18, 17–21, 20–22	Silver	

=== BWF World Tour (11 titles, 9 runners-up) ===
The BWF World Tour, which was announced on 19 March 2017 and implemented in 2018, is a series of elite badminton tournaments sanctioned by the Badminton World Federation (BWF). The BWF World Tours are divided into levels of World Tour Finals, Super 1000, Super 750, Super 500, Super 300 (part of the HSBC World Tour), and the BWF Tour Super 100.

Women's singles
Year	Tournament	Level	Opponent	Score	Result	Ref.
2018	Thailand Open	Super 500	(India) P. V. Sindhu	21–15, 21–18	(gold) Winner	
2018	Japan Open	Super 750	(Spain) Carolina Marín	19–21, 21–17, 11–21	(silver) Runner-up	
2018	Korea Open	Super 500	(United States) Beiwen Zhang	21–10, 17–21, 21–16	(gold) Winner	
2018	Fuzhou China Open	Super 750	(China) Chen Yufei	10–21, 16–21	(silver) Runner-up	
2018	Hong Kong Open	Super 500	(Thailand) Ratchanok Intanon	21–19, 24–22	(gold) Winner	
2018	BWF World Tour Finals	World Tour Finals	(India) P. V. Sindhu	19–21, 17–21	(silver) Runner-up	
2019	Singapore Open	Super 500	(Chinese Taipei) Tai Tzu-ying	19–21, 15–21	(silver) Runner-up	
2019	Australian Open	Super 300	(China) Chen Yufei	15–21, 3–21	(silver) Runner-up	
2019	Japan Open	Super 750	(Japan) Akane Yamaguchi	13–21, 15–21	(silver) Runner-up	
2019	Denmark Open	Super 750	(Chinese Taipei) Tai Tzu-ying	17–21, 14–21	(silver) Runner-up	
2019	Fuzhou China Open	Super 750	(China) Chen Yufei	21–9, 12–21, 18–21	(silver) Runner-up	
2020	Denmark Open	Super 750	(Spain) Carolina Marín	21–19, 21–17	(gold) Winner	
2021	All England Open	Super 1000	(Thailand) Pornpawee Chochuwong	21–12, 21–16	(gold) Winner	
2023	Syed Modi International	Super 300	(Denmark) Line Kjærsfeldt	21–19, 21–16	(gold) Winner	
2023	Odisha Masters	Super 100	(Hong Kong) Lo Sin Yan	21–7, 21–23, 22–20	(gold) Winner	
2024	Indonesia Masters	Super 500	(China) Wang Zhiyi	14–21, 13–21	(silver) Runner-up	
2025	Kaohsiung Masters	Super 100	(Japan) Hina Akechi	21–16, 21–17	(gold) Winner	
2025	Malaysia Super 100	Super 100	(Malaysia) Wong Ling Ching	21–18, 21–11	(gold) Winner	
2025 (II)	Indonesia Masters	Super 100	(India) Devika Sihag	21–11, 21–9	(gold) Winner	
2026	Orléans Masters	Super 300	(Thailand) Pitchamon Opatniputh	21–15, 21–15	(gold) Winner	

=== BWF Superseries (4 titles, 3 runners-up) ===
The BWF Superseries, which was launched on 14 December 2006 and implemented in 2007, was a series of elite badminton tournaments, sanctioned by the Badminton World Federation (BWF). BWF Superseries levels were Superseries and Superseries Premier. A season of Superseries consisted of twelve tournaments around the world that had been introduced since 2011. Successful players were invited to the Superseries Finals, which were held at the end of each year.

Women's singles
Year	Tournament	Opponent	Score	Result	Ref.
2014	Hong Kong Open	(Chinese Taipei) Tai Tzu-ying	19–21, 11–21	(silver) Runner-up	
2015	Japan Open	(Japan) Akane Yamaguchi	21–18, 21–12	(gold) Winner	
2015	Hong Kong Open	(Spain) Carolina Marín	17–21, 21–18, 20–22	(silver) Runner-up	
2015	Dubai World Superseries Finals	(China) Wang Yihan	22–20, 21–18	(gold) Winner	
2016	All England Open	(China) Wang Shixian	21–11, 16–21, 21–19	(gold) Winner	
2017	Australian Open	(Japan) Akane Yamaguchi	21–12, 21–23, 21–17	(gold) Winner	
2017	Korea Open	(India) P. V. Sindhu	20–22, 21–11, 18–21	(silver) Runner-up	

BWF Super Series Finals tournament
BWF Super Series Premier tournament
BWF Super Series tournament

=== BWF Grand Prix (6 titles) ===
The BWF Grand Prix had two levels, the BWF Grand Prix and Grand Prix Gold. It was a series of badminton tournaments sanctioned by the Badminton World Federation (BWF) which was held from 2007 to 2017.

Women's singles
Year	Tournament	Opponent	Score	Result	Ref.
2012	Canada Open	(Japan) Sayaka Takahashi	21–8, 21–16	(gold) Winner	
2014	New Zealand Open	(Japan) Kana Ito	21–15, 21–3	(gold) Winner	
2014	Vietnam Open	(Japan) Aya Ohori	21–15, 21–11	(gold) Winner	
2014	Korea Grand Prix	(Japan) Sayaka Sato	21–17, 21–13	(gold) Winner	
2015	Malaysia Masters	(Japan) Sayaka Takahashi	21–13, 21–17	(gold) Winner	
2015	U.S. Open	(Japan) Sayaka Sato	21–16, 21–14	(gold) Winner	

BWF Grand Prix Gold tournament
BWF Grand Prix tournament

=== BWF International Challenge/Series (2 titles, 1 runner-up) ===
Women's singles
Year	Tournament	Opponent	Score	Result	Ref.
2010	Lao International	(Thailand) Nitchaon Jindapol	16–21, 17–21	(silver) Runner-up	
2011	Austrian International	(Japan) Mayu Sekiya	21–6, 21–16	(gold) Winner	
2015	China International	(China) Chen Yufei	21–19, 21–16	(gold) Winner	

BWF International Challenge tournament

== Performance timeline ==
Key

W	Won	F	Finalist	SF	Semi-finalist
QF	Quarter-finalist	#R	Rounds 4, 3, 2, 1	RR	Round-robin stage
Q#	Qualification round	A	Absent	w/d	Withdrew
G	Gold	S	Silver	B	Bronze
NH	Not held	N/A	Not applicable	DNQ	Did not qualify

=== Career overview ===
Singles	Played	Wins	Losses	Balance
Total	603	439	164	+275
Current year (2026)	17	12	5	+7

Doubles	Played	Wins	Losses	Balance
Total	11	5	6	-1
Current year (2026)	0	0	0	0

=== National team ===
==== Junior level ====
Events	2011	2012
Asian Junior Championships	QF	G
World Junior Championships	5th	S

==== Senior level ====
Team events	2015	2016	2017	2018	2019	2020	2021	2022	2023	2024	2025	2026	Ref.
Asia Team Championships	NH	S	NH	G	NH	A	NH	A	NH	B	NH	A	
Asian Games	NH			G	NH			A	NH			S	
Uber Cup	NH	B	NH	G	NH	A	NH	B	NH	B	NH	A	
Sudirman Cup	S	NH	B	NH	S	NH	A	NH	A	NH	A	NH	

=== Individual competitions ===
==== Junior level ====
Girls' singles

Events	2011	2012
Asian Junior Championships	2R	S
World Junior Championships	B	G

Girls' doubles

Events	2011
Asian Junior Championships	2R
World Junior Championships	2R

==== Senior level ====
===== Women's singles =====
Events	2012	2013	2014	2015	2016	2017	2018	2019	2020	2021	2022	2023	2024	2025	2026	Ref
Asian Championships	1R	A		3R	QF	1R	1R	QF	NH		1R	A	1R	A	QF	
Asian Games	NH		A	NH			QF	NH			A	NH			DNQ	
World Championships	NH	DNQ		2R	NH	G	QF	S	NH	w/d	w/d	QF	NH	DNQ	QF	
Olympic Games	DNQ	NH			B	NH			QF	NH			DNQ	NH		

Tournament	BWF Superseries / Grand Prix								BWF World Tour									Best	Ref
Tournament	2010	2011	2012	2013	2014	2015	2016	2017	2018	2019	2020	2021	2022	2023	2024	2025	2026	Best	Ref
Malaysia Open	A			QF	A	QF	2R	SF	2R	SF	NH		QF	1R	A	1R	2R	SF ('17, '19)	
India Open	A					QF	w/d	QF	A		NH		A	1R	QF	1R	1R	QF ('15, '17, '24)	
Indonesia Masters	A	2R	2R	A				NH	QF	1R	2R	A		1R	F	2R	SF	F ('24)	
Thailand Masters	NH						A					NH		A	QF	A		QF ('24)	
German Open	A					SF	SF	A	SF	SF	NH		w/d	w/d	A			SF ('15, '16, '18, '19)	
All England Open	A					1R	W	1R	QF	SF	SF	W	QF	1R	1R	1R	1R	W ('16, '21)	
Swiss Open	A										NH	A		2R	SF	A	SF	SF ('24, '26)	
Orléans Masters	A										NH	A					W	W ('26)	
Thailand Open	A	1R	QF	A	NH	A			W	w/d	w/d	NH	2R	A				W ('18)	
Thailand Open	A	1R	QF	A	NH	A			W	w/d	w/d	NH	2R	A				W ('18)	
Baoji China Masters	NH														A	2R	A	2R ('25)	
Malaysia Masters	A		QF	A	SF	W	A		w/d	QF	QF	NH	QF	A		2R	A	W ('15)	
Singapore Open	A					QF	2R	1R	A	F	NH		A		QF	A	1R	F ('19)	
Indonesia Open	A					1R	QF	2R	2R	QF	NH	A	QF	1R	1R	1R	2R	QF ('16, '19, '22)	
Australian Open	A					1R	1R	W	A	F	NH		QF	A			SF	W ('17)	
Macau Open	A										NH				A	QF	A	QF ('25)	
U.S. Open	A					W	A				NH			A		1R	A	W ('15)	
Canada Open	A	SF	W	A							NH		A	w/d	SF	QF	A	W ('12)	
Japan Open	A	2R	2R	A		W	QF	SF	F	F	NH		w/d	1R	2R	A	QF	W ('15)	
China Open	A		1R	1R	A	QF	1R	1R	SF	1R	NH			A			w/d	SF ('18)	
Taipei Open	A				1R	QF	A				NH		A			2R	A	QF ('15)	
Korea Masters	1R	A			W	A					NH		A			2R	A	W ('14)	
China Masters	A		2R	A					F	F	NH			QF	A		QF	F ('18, '19)	
Vietnam Open	A		2R	A	W	A					NH		A					W ('14)	
Indonesia Masters Super 100	NH								A		NH		A	QF	A	QF	A	W ('25 I)	
Indonesia Masters Super 100	NH								A		NH		A	A		W	A	W ('25 I)	
Arctic Open	A	NH	A								NH			1R	A		SF	SF ('26)	
Denmark Open	A					2R	QF	w/d	QF	F	W	A	2R	1R	A		SF	W ('20)	
Malaysia Super 100	N/A													A		W	A	W ('25)	
French Open	A					QF	w/d	A	2R	2R	NH	A	2R	1R	1R	A	SF	SF ('26)	
Hylo Open	Q3	A				QF	A						SF	A				SF ('22)	
Korea Open	A					QF	w/d	F	W	QF	NH		A		w/d	A		W ('18)	
Japan Masters	NH													1R	A	SF	QF	SF ('25)	
Kaohsiung Masters	NH													2R	A	W	A	W ('25)	
Hong Kong Open	A		Q2		F	F	w/d	A	W	QF	NH			1R	w/d	A	w/d	W ('18)	
Syed Modi International	A		SF	NH	A						NH		A	W	A	2R	A	W ('23)	
Odisha Masters	NH											A		W	A			W ('23)	
Super Series / Tour Finals	DNQ					W	DNQ	w/d	F	SF	DNQ							W ('15)	
New Zealand Open	NH	A	NH	A	W	A					NH							W ('14)	
Russian Open	A				SF	A					NH							SF ('14)	
Year-end ranking	198	83	31	180	25	7	11	7	2	4	4	5	13	26	20	30		2	
Tournament	2010	2011	2012	2013	2014	2015	2016	2017	2018	2019	2020	2021	2022	2023	2024	2025	2026	Best	Ref

===== Mixed doubles =====
Tournament	BWF Superseries / Grand Prix	Best
Tournament	2011	Best
Japan Open	Q1	Q1 ('11)
Canada Open	2R	2R ('11)
Year-end ranking	273	261

== Record against selected opponents ==
Okuhara's record against players who have reached the final of the year-end championships, the semi-finals of the World Championships, or the quarter-finals of the Olympic Games. Accurate as of 21 August 2026.

Player	M	W	L	Diff.
(China) Chen Yufei	16	4	12	–8
(China) Han Yue	4	3	1	+2
(China) He Bingjiao	14	9	5	+4
(China) Li Xuerui	5	3	2	+1
(China) Wang Shixian	4	2	2	0
(China) Wang Yihan	6	3	3	0
(China) Wang Zhiyi	4	0	4	–4
(China) Zhang Yiman	2	1	1	0
(Chinese Taipei) Cheng Shao-chieh	1	0	1	–1
(Chinese Taipei) Tai Tzu-ying	15	6	9	–3
(France) Pi Hongyan	1	0	1	–1
(Hong Kong) Yip Pui Yin	6	5	1	+4
(India) Saina Nehwal	14	5	9	–4
(India) P. V. Sindhu	21	10	11	–1

Player	M	W	L	Diff.
(Indonesia) Lindaweni Fanetri	6	4	2	+2
(Indonesia) Gregoria Mariska Tunjung	8	5	3	+2
(Indonesia) Putri Kusuma Wardani	3	1	2	–1
(Japan) Minatsu Mitani	4	4	0	+4
(Japan) Aya Ohori	13	10	3	+7
(Japan) Akane Yamaguchi	21	12	9	+3
(South Korea) An Se-young	5	0	5	–5
(South Korea) Bae Yeon-ju	4	3	1	+2
(South Korea) Sung Ji-hyun	10	6	4	+2
(Spain) Carolina Marín	17	8	9	–1
(Thailand) Pornpawee Chochuwong	9	6	3	+3
(Thailand) Porntip Buranaprasertsuk	5	1	4	–3
(Thailand) Ratchanok Intanon	21	13	8	+5
