= Carolina Marín =

Spanish badminton player (born 1993)

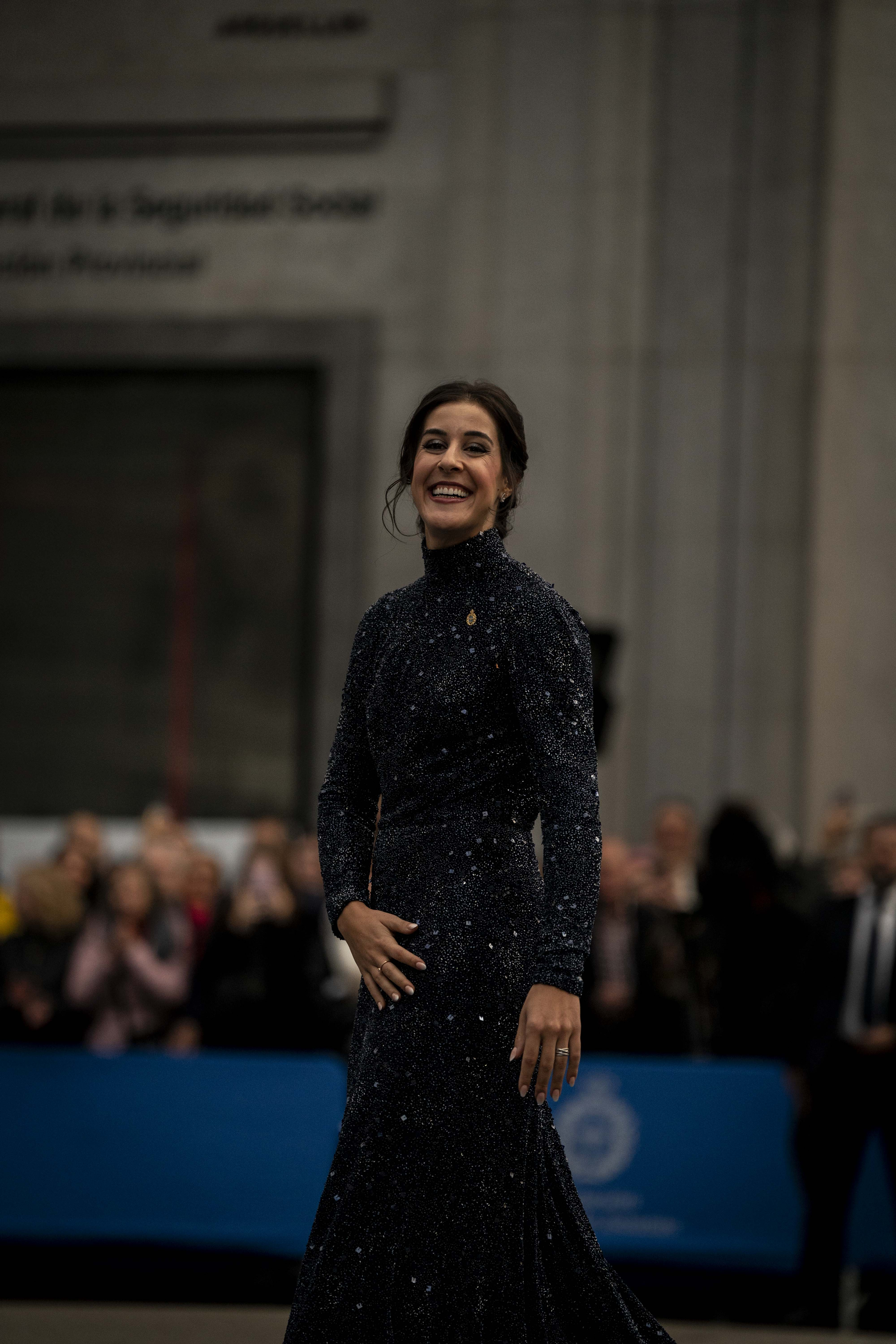
- Marín in 2024

Personal information
- Born: Carolina María Marín Martín; 15 June 1993 (age 33) Huelva, Andalusia, Spain
- Years active: 2009–2024
- Height: 1.72 m (5 ft 8 in)
- Weight: 65 kg (143 lb)

Sport
- Country: Spain
- Sport: Badminton
- Handedness: Left
- Coached by: Fernando Rivas
- Retired: 26 March 2026

Women's singles
- Career record: 515 wins, 144 losses
- Highest ranking: 1 (11 June 2015)
- BWF profile
Medal record
Women's badminton
Representing Spain
Olympic Games
Gold medal – first place	2016 Rio de Janeiro	Women's singles
World Championships
Gold medal – first place	2014 Copenhagen	Women's singles
Gold medal – first place	2015 Jakarta	Women's singles
Gold medal – first place	2018 Nanjing	Women's singles
Silver medal – second place	2023 Copenhagen	Women's singles
European Games
Gold medal – first place	2023 Kraków–Małopolska	Women's singles
European Championships
Gold medal – first place	2014 Kazan	Women's singles
Gold medal – first place	2016 La Roche-sur-Yon	Women's singles
Gold medal – first place	2017 Kolding	Women's singles
Gold medal – first place	2018 Huelva	Women's singles
Gold medal – first place	2021 Kyiv	Women's singles
Gold medal – first place	2022 Madrid	Women's singles
Gold medal – first place	2024 Saarbrücken	Women's singles
European Team Championships
Silver medal – second place	2024 Łódź	Women's team
Bronze medal – third place	2016 Kazan	Women's team
Bronze medal – third place	2018 Kazan	Women's team
World Junior Championships
Bronze medal – third place	2011 Taipei	Girls' singles
European Junior Championships
Gold medal – first place	2011 Vantaa	Girls' singles
Silver medal – second place	2009 Milan	Girls' singles

Carolina María Marín Martín (born 15 June 1993) is a former professional badminton player from Spain. She is an Olympic Champion, three-time World Champion, eight-time European Champion, and former World No. 1 in women's singles.

Marin won the Olympic gold medal in women's singles at the 2016 Rio Olympics, thereby becoming the first non-Asian female player to win a badminton gold medal at the Olympics. She won the World Championships in 2014, 2015, and 2018, and held the World No. 1 ranking for a record total of 66 weeks. Marín is the only player in history to win a gold medal in the singles’ discipline of all continental championships (individual events), having won every single European Championships title from 2014 to 2024, in addition to a European Games title in 2023.

Marín was appointed as the brand ambassador of football major LaLiga and Meliá Hotels International for its promotion in other countries. In 2024, Marín was awarded the Princess of Asturias Award for her contribution in Sports.

== Early life ==
Marín was a keen flamenco dancer in her childhood. After a friend introduced her to badminton, she fell in love with the sport and decided to stop dancing and play badminton wholeheartedly. At the age of eight, she started playing badminton at the IES La Orden in Huelva. She had to leave her hometown and her family at a very young age to travel all the way to Madrid for training at the National Centre.

== Career ==
=== 2009–2012: First international title, European Junior Champions and London Olympics ===
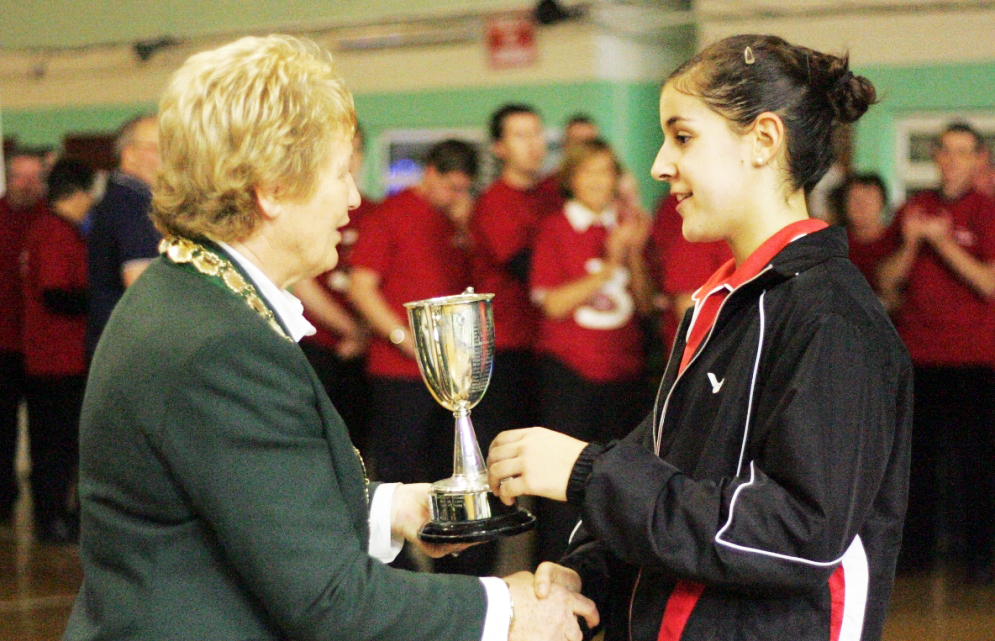
Marín won her first international title at 2009 Irish International in Dublin

In 2009, she became the first Spanish badminton player to win a silver medal first, at the European Junior Championships, and also in the same year, won the gold medal at the European U-17 Junior Championships. She won her first major title at the Irish International tournament coming through the qualification stage and beating the Dutch player Rachel Van Cutsen in the final in the rubber game.

In 2011, she alongside her teammate, Beatriz Corrales, made history for the Spanish badminton, after placing two representatives of Spain in the final at the continental European Junior Championships held in Vantaa, Finland, and Marín grabbed the gold medal. She also competed at the World Junior Championships in Taipei, reaching the semi-finals, but lost to Elisabeth Purwaningtyas of Indonesia and settled for the bronze medal.

Marín attended her first ever Olympic Games at the 2012 London Olympics where she lost in the first round to Li Xuerui.

=== 2013–2014: First Grand Prix title, European and World Champions ===
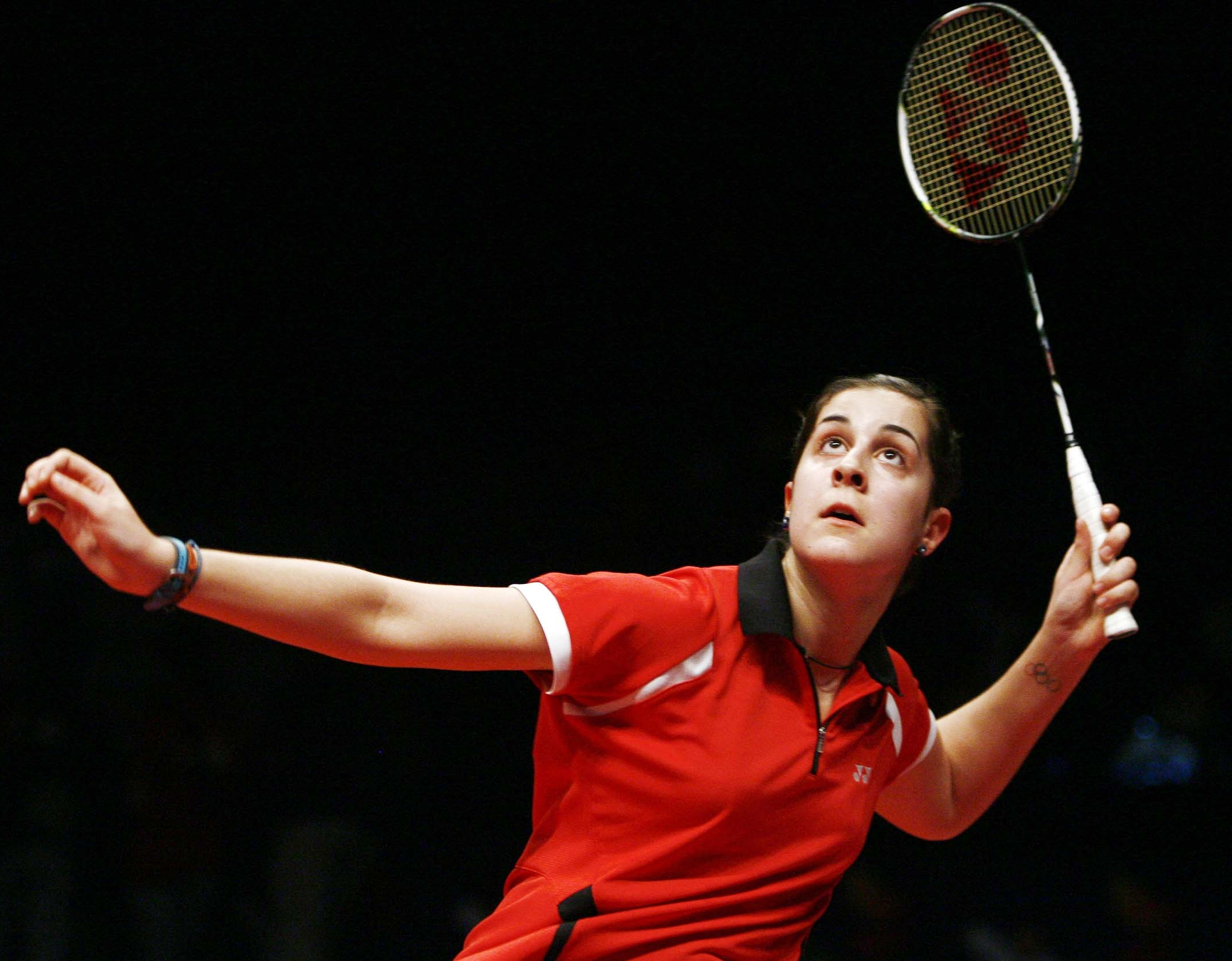
Marín at 2013 Axiata Cup Surabaya

In 2013, she became the first Spanish badminton player to win a Grand Prix Gold title after winning the London Grand Prix Gold. In August, Marín played for the Bangalore-based team Banga Beats in the inaugural edition of the Indian Badminton League (IBL). In April, she won her first European Championships title.

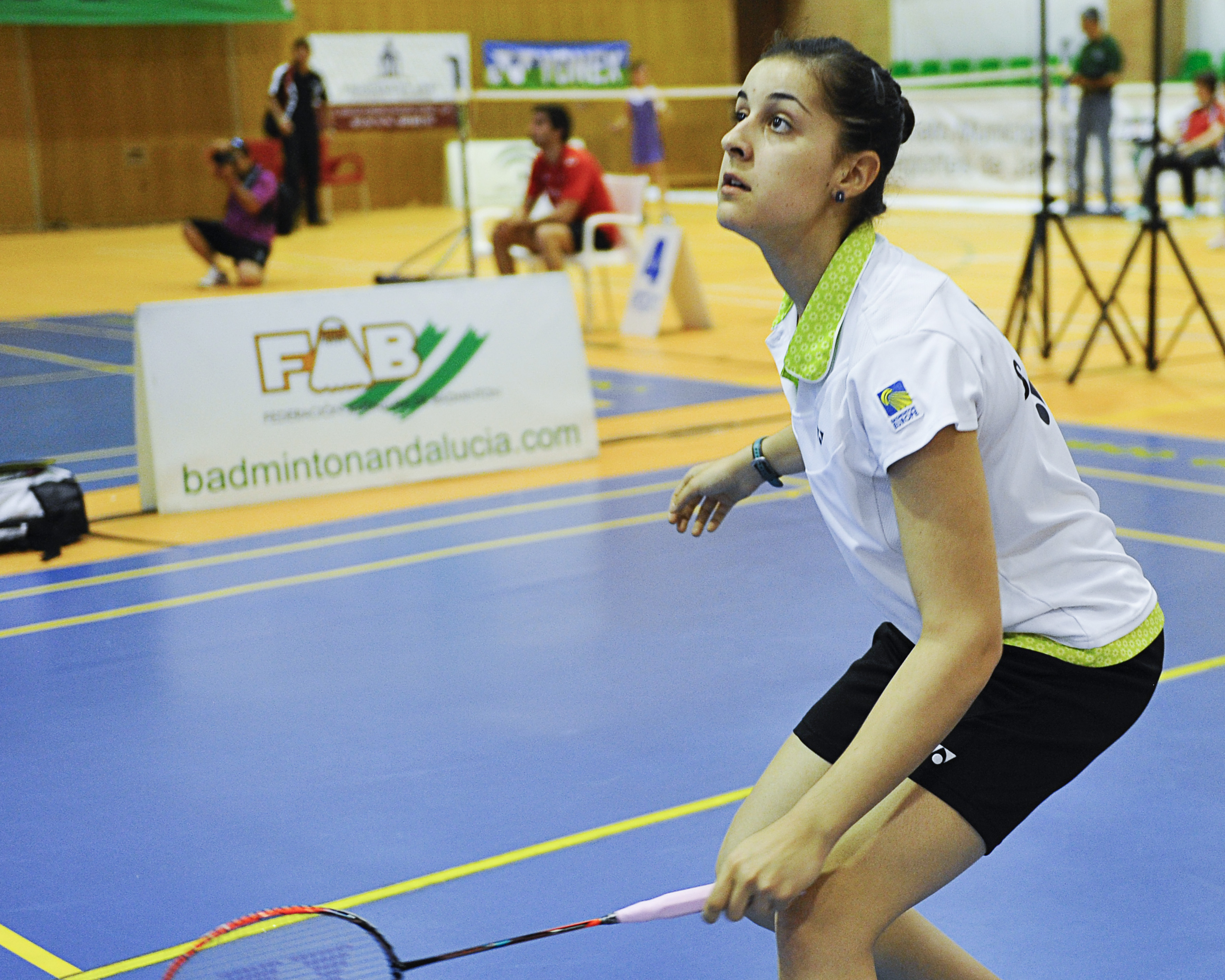
Marín at 2014 Spanish National Championships in Jaén

On 31 August 2014, she defeated Li Xuerui of China in the World Championships women's singles final and became the first Spaniard to win a World Championship title and the third European female player to achieve the gold medal, after Lene Køppen (1977) and Camilla Martin (1999). At the age of 21, she became the youngest European that won the World Championships ever.

=== 2015: Five Superseries title, second World Championships and World #1 ===
In 2015, she won the All England Open, her first Superseries Premier title in her first Superseries Premier final after defeating Saina Nehwal in the final with score 16–21, 21–14, 21–7. The title propelled her to rank number 4 in the world ranking and, for the first time, no. 1 in the Superseries standing. At India Open, she had the chance to unseat Li Xuerui as the new world no. 1, however, she narrowly lost to Thai prodigy Ratchanok Intanon in a close three games at the semi-finals stage. She rose to a career-high as world no. 2 in the world ranking on 2 April.

On 5 April, Marín won her second straight Superseries Premier title, beating Olympic champion Li Xuerui for the second consecutive time at the 2015 Malaysia Open with a score of 19–21, 21–19, 21–17. In August, she defended her title at the World Championship by beating Saina Nehwal of India in 21–16, 21–19. 2015 was the golden year for Marín, where in addition to defending the World Championships title, she also won other Superseries titles such as the Australian Open, French Open, and Hong Kong Open.

=== 2016: Olympics gold ===
In August, she represented her country at the Rio Olympics. She arrived at Rio as the number one seed and won a gold medal by beating India's P. V. Sindhu in the women's singles final with a score of 19–21, 21–12, 21–15. She made history by becoming the first non-Asian to win the Olympic badminton women's singles gold medal. An indoor arena in Huelva is named after her honour, with Marín herself attending the inauguration.

=== 2017–2018: Fourth European and Third World Championships title ===
In 2017, Marín won the Japan Open Superseries title after beating He Bingjiao of China in the final, winning a Superseries title after almost two years. At the Hong Kong Open, which took place in late November, Marín retired to Michelle Li, losing 21–19, 13–21, 8–11, due to a hip injury that she sustained during the match. Marín later announced on Twitter and Instagram that, due to her hip injury, she would not be participating in the season-ending Dubai World Superseries Finals.

On 29 April 2018, she won her fourth consecutive European Championships title in her home soil Huelva, Spain, by beating Evgeniya Kosetskaya with a score of 21–15, 21–7 in the final. On 5 August, she won the title in the World Championships by defeating P. V. Sindhu of India in straight games 21–19, 21–10, making her the first female player in history to win three World Championships titles. In September, she won World Tour titles at the Japan and China Open.

=== 2019–2020: ACL injury and comeback ===
Marín began her 2019 season with a runner-up effort at the Malaysia Masters, where she lost to Ratchanok Intanon in straight games. On 27 January, Marín suffered a ruptured anterior cruciate ligament (ACL) injury during the Indonesia Masters final against Saina Nehwal, when she was 10–3 ahead in the first games. Marín subsequently retired from the match and underwent ACL reconstruction surgery the same day as soon as she arrived back in Madrid. She had a four-month recovery, dedicating ten hours a day to physical and technical rehabilitation, with morning and afternoon physiotherapy sessions, and swimming pool work.

In September, after an eight-month break forced by the injury, Marín returned to competition at the 2019 Vietnam Open but suffered an opening-round defeat to Supanida Katethong. However, she rebounded and won the China Open on 22 September, defeating Tai Tzu-ying in the finals with a score of 14–21, 21–17, 21–18. This was Marín's first title of the season, which she followed with the semi-finals at the Denmark Open, where she was defeated in three tight games by Nozomi Okuhara. She reached the final of the French Open next week, where she was defeated by Korean youngster An Se-young in three games 21–16, 18–21, 5–21. Her achievements in the last three tournaments succeeded in bringing her back into the world top 10 of BWF women's singles ranking. She further won Syed Modi and Italian International tournaments later in the year.

Marín started the 2020 season at the Southeast Asian tour on a positive note; reaching the semi-finals of Malaysia Masters where she lost to Chen Yufei. A week later, she then reached the final of the Indonesia Masters, where she narrowly missed the title after getting defeated from Ratchanok Intanon in three games 19–21, 21–11, 18–21. She continued her good form and thereafter reached the semi-finals of Thailand Masters, which she lost to top seed Akane Yamaguchi in a close rubber game. In February, she reached the final of her home event Barcelona Spain Masters, where she lost in an upset to rising Thai star Pornpawee Chochuwong in the rubber games 21–11, 16–21, 18–21. In March, she competed as 8th seeds in the All England Open, but stopped by the eventual champion Tai Tzu-ying in the semi-finals.

In July, Marín's father died following an accident in February. She reached the final of the Denmark Open in October for the very first time but was defeated by Okuhara in straight games.

=== 2021–2022: Sixth European Championships title ===
Marín won the first title of the year, the Thailand Open Super 1000 event, by beating World no. 1 Tai Tzu-ying in two comfortable games. She didn't lose any game in the whole tournament. Continuing her scintillating form, she won the second edition of Thailand Open, the Toyota Thailand Open, also a super 1000 event by beating Tai yet again. In contesting her first-ever World Tour Finals final, she lost to same rival Tai in three games after failing to capitalize her lead in the final game. She won her first world tour title in Switzerland by beating reigning World champion P. V. Sindhu with a very dominating display, winning 21–12, 21–5. Marín planned to compete at the All England Open but pulled out of the competition due to an injury she suffered in the first round of the Swiss Open.

Marín made history as the first-ever player to claim five consecutive titles at the European Championships, defeating young Dane Line Christophersen in the final. She was expected to defend her title at the 2020 Tokyo Olympics but was forced to withdraw due to knee injury she suffered in June while training.

In 2022, 11 months after Marín second ACL injury, she won her sixth European Championships title. Her best result in the 2022 BWF World Tour was reaching the French Open final, but lost the match to He Bingjiao in a close rubber games.

=== 2023: Silver medals at World Championships and World Tour Finals, return to top 5 ===
Marín began 2023 at the Malaysia Open, the first Super 1000 event of the year, reaching the quarter-finals before losing to Chen Yufei in two close games. She repeated this result at the India Open, falling to Akane Yamaguchi in three games. At the Indonesia Masters, Marín reached her first final in nearly two years. She faced world number two An Se-young in a three-game match lasting 80 minutes, ultimately losing. In March, Marín reached the quarter-finals of All England Open Championship but withdrew due to injury, giving An Se-young a walkover. She returned home for the Spain Masters, reaching the semi-finals before being defeated by Gregoria Mariska Tunjung in three games. Marín claimed her first title in over two years at the Orléans Masters, a Super 300 event, after defeating Beiwen Zhang in a three-game final.

In June, Marín faced world number one An Se-young in the Thailand Open semi-finals, losing in straight games. The Singapore Open marked the first time in 2023 that she failed to reach a tournament quarter-finals as she lost to Supanida Katethong in the second round. However, She rebounded at the Indonesia Open, a Super 1000 event, defeating Goh Jin Wei, Yeo Jia Min, Tai Tzu-ying, and Ratchanok Intanon to reach the final. There, she lost again to Chen Yufei with an 18–21, 19–21 scoreline, mirroring their Malaysia Open match result. Marín capped off June by representing Spain at the European Games, winning her first gold medal in the tournament with a straight-game victory over Mia Blichfeldt.

Entering the World Championships taking place in Denmark as the sixth seed, Marín exceeded expectations as she defeated top-four players Tai Tzu-ying and Akane Yamaguchi en route to her fourth World Championship final. There, she lost in straight games to top-seeded An Se-young, earning a silver medal. In September, she reached the quarter-finals of both the China and Hong Kong Opens.

In October, Marín's strong year-to-date performance saw her return to the world number five ranking. She reached the final of the Denmark Open, with a notable quarter-finals win over Tai Tzu-ying, there she lost to Chen Yufei in straight games. This semi-finals was marked by her tension with P.V. Sindhu over shuttle post-rally returns and screams, resulting in yellow cards for both players; both players later publicly apologised and reconciled. At the French Open, Marín suffered an upset loss to Aya Ohori in the quarter-finals. Further results included reaching the quarter-finals of the Japan Masters and early upset in the China Masters to unseeded Nguyễn Thùy Linh. Marín's world tour ranking of number four qualified her for the $2.5-million-prized year-end World Tour Finals. She won all her round-robin matches without dropping a game, including a notable win over Chen Yufei. After defeating Chen again in a three-game, 104-minute semi-finals, Marín reached her first-ever World Tour Finals final. She finished as runner-up after losing to Tai Tzu-ying in three games. In 2023, she earned $257,335 in prize money, making her the year's fourteenth highest-earning badminton player.

=== 2024: All England title, seventh European Championships title, return to top 3 ===
Marín began 2024 by opting out of BWF tournaments in January and February, citing continued recovery from injuries. Her return to competition was at the European Women's Team Championships as part of the Spain's national team. Despite Marín's individual victories over Kirsty Gilmour and Line Kjærsfeldt in the semi-finals and finals, respectively, her team finished as runners-up in the tournament, which was by far the best result for Spain's national team. In March, Marín experienced an early exit at the French Open, losing to Beiwen Zhang in the opening round. However, she rebounded at the prestigious All England Open. En route to the final, she had notable victories over Wang Zhiyi, Chen Yufei, and Tai Tzu-ying. In her final match against Akane Yamaguchi, Marín secured a hard-fought victory in the first game (26–24) and was leading 11–1 in the second game when Yamaguchi retired due to injury, granting Marín her second All England title after a nine-year interval. In the following week, Marín extended her winning streak by clinching her second title of the year, the Swiss Open title, thus becoming the oldest women's singles player in 16 years to achieve this feat, following Zhang Ning's triumph in 2007. In the quest for her second Swiss Open title, she defeated Gregoria Mariska Tunjung in a hard-fought final, with a scoreline of 21–19, 13–21, 22–20.

In April, Marín successfully defended her European Championships title without dropping a game throughout the whole tournament. This achievement helped Marín become the only player in badminton history to win at least seven gold medals at a single discipline (women's singles) of any continental championship, as she has won the European Championships consecutively since 2014. With 9,200 points gained from winning the championship, Marín returned to world's no. 3 for the first time in over three years (since March 2021). In June, entering Indonesia Open as the third seed, Marín overpowered Zhang Yiman, Hsu Wen-chi, and Han Yue with straight wins before losing to Chen Yufei after three games in the semi-finals. Marín then decided to skip all the tournaments leading up to the Olympics in order to focus on the preparations of this paramount event.

Entering the Olympics as the fourth seed, Marín advanced effortlessly through the group stage with straight wins against unseeded players Jenjira Stadelmann and Rachael Darragh. In the round of 16, she defeated the ninth seed Beiwen Zhang in three games to advance to the quarter-finals, where she secured a straight-games victory over the eighth seed Aya Ohori. At 31, Marín became the second oldest women's singles player to reach an Olympic semi-final, where she faced the sixth seed He Bingjiao. Marín won the first game 21-14 and was leading 10–5 in the second game when she sustained a serious knee injury following a bad landing from an overhead smash, causing her to collapse. Despite the injury, she played on with a knee brace on and conceded two more points before retiring from the match due to limited mobility. Due to the injury, Marín was unable to compete in the bronze medal match against Gregoria Mariska Tunjung.

On 26 March 2026, Marín announced her retirement from badminton, at the age of 32.

== Achievements ==
=== Olympic Games ===
Women's singles
Year	Venue	Opponent	Score	Result	Ref.
2016	Riocentro – Pavilion 4 Rio de Janeiro, Brazil	(India) P. V. Sindhu	19–21, 21–12, 21–15	Gold	

=== World Championships ===
Women's singles
Year	Venue	Opponent	Score	Result	Ref.
2014	Ballerup Super Arena; Copenhagen, Denmark	(China) Li Xuerui	17–21, 21–17, 21–18	Gold	
2015	Istora Senayan; Jakarta, Indonesia	(India) Saina Nehwal	21–16, 21–19	Gold	
2018	Nanjing Youth Olympic Sports Park; Nanjing, China	(India) P. V. Sindhu	21–19, 21–10	Gold	
2023	Royal Arena; Copenhagen, Denmark	(South Korea) An Se-young	12–21, 10–21	Silver	

=== European Games ===
Women's singles
Year	Venue	Opponent	Score	Result	Ref.
2023	Arena Jaskółka; Tarnów, Poland	(Denmark) Mia Blichfeldt	21–15, 21–14	Gold	

=== European Championships ===
Women's singles
Year	Venue	Opponent	Score	Result	Ref.
2014	Gymnastics Center; Kazan, Russia	(Denmark) Anna Thea Madsen	21–9, 14–21, 21–8	Gold	
2016	Vendespace; La Roche-sur-Yon, France	(Scotland) Kirsty Gilmour	21–12, 21–18	Gold	
2017	Sydbank Arena; Kolding, Denmark	(Scotland) Kirsty Gilmour	21–14, 21–12	Gold	
2018	Palacio de los Deportes Carolina Marín; Huelva, Spain	(Russia) Evgeniya Kosetskaya	21–15, 21–7	Gold	
2021	Palace of Sports; Kyiv, Ukraine	(Denmark) Line Christophersen	21–13, 21–18	Gold	
2022	Polideportivo Municipal Gallur; Madrid, Spain	(Scotland) Kirsty Gilmour	21–10, 21–12	Gold	
2024	Saarlandhalle; Saarbrücken, Germany	(Scotland) Kirsty Gilmour	21–11, 21–18	Gold	

=== BWF World Junior Championships ===
Girls' singles
Year	Venue	Opponent	Score	Result	Ref.
2011	Taoyuan Arena; Taipei, Taiwan	(Indonesia) Elyzabeth Purwaningtyas	21–23, 21–17, 18–21	Bronze	

=== European Junior Championships ===
Girls' singles
Year	Venue	Opponent	Score	Result	Ref.
2009	Federal Technical Centre – Palabadminton; Milan, Italy	(Denmark) Anne Hald Jensen	21–18, 18–21, 19–21	Silver	
2011	Energia Areena; Vantaa, Finland	(Spain) Beatriz Corrales	21–14, 23–21	Gold	

=== BWF World Tour (10 titles, 12 runners-up) ===
The BWF World Tour, which was announced on 19 March 2017 and implemented in 2018, is a series of elite badminton tournaments sanctioned by the Badminton World Federation (BWF). The BWF World Tours are divided into levels of World Tour Finals, Super 1000, Super 750, Super 500, Super 300 (part of the HSBC World Tour), and the BWF Tour Super 100.

Women's singles
Year	Tournament	Level	Opponent	Score	Result	Ref.
2018	Japan Open	Super 750	(Japan) Nozomi Okuhara	21–19, 17–21, 21–11	(gold) Winner	
2018	China Open	Super 1000	(China) Chen Yufei	21–18, 21–13	(gold) Winner	
2019	Malaysia Masters	Super 500	(Thailand) Ratchanok Intanon	9–21, 20–22	(silver) Runner-up	
2019	Indonesia Masters	Super 500	(India) Saina Nehwal	10–4 retired	(silver) Runner-up	
2019	China Open	Super 1000	(Chinese Taipei) Tai Tzu-ying	14–21, 21–17, 21–18	(gold) Winner	
2019	French Open	Super 750	(South Korea) An Se-young	21–16, 18–21, 5–21	(silver) Runner-up	
2019	Syed Modi International	Super 300	(Thailand) Phittayaporn Chaiwan	21–12, 21–16	(gold) Winner	
2020	Indonesia Masters	Super 500	(Thailand) Ratchanok Intanon	19–21, 21–11, 18–21	(silver) Runner-up	
2020	Spain Masters	Super 300	(Thailand) Pornpawee Chochuwong	21–11, 16–21, 18–21	(silver) Runner-up	
2020	Denmark Open	Super 750	(Japan) Nozomi Okuhara	19–21, 17–21	(silver) Runner-up	
2020 (I)	Thailand Open	Super 1000	(Chinese Taipei) Tai Tzu-ying	21–9, 21–16	(gold) Winner	
2020 (II)	Thailand Open	Super 1000	(Chinese Taipei) Tai Tzu-ying	21–19, 21–17	(gold) Winner	
2020	BWF World Tour Finals	World Tour Finals	(Chinese Taipei) Tai Tzu-ying	21–14, 8–21, 19–21	(silver) Runner-up	
2021	Swiss Open	Super 300	(India) P. V. Sindhu	21–12, 21–5	(gold) Winner	
2022	French Open	Super 750	(China) He Bingjiao	21–16, 9–21, 20–22	(silver) Runner-up	
2023	Indonesia Masters	Super 500	(South Korea) An Se-young	21–18, 18–21, 13–21	(silver) Runner-up	
2023	Orléans Masters	Super 300	(United States) Beiwen Zhang	25–23, 9–21, 21–10	(gold) Winner	
2023	Indonesia Open	Super 1000	(China) Chen Yufei	18–21, 19–21	(silver) Runner-up	
2023	Denmark Open	Super 750	(China) Chen Yufei	14–21, 19–21	(silver) Runner-up	
2023	BWF World Tour Finals	World Tour Finals	(Chinese Taipei) Tai Tzu-ying	21–12, 14–21, 18–21	(silver) Runner-up	
2024	All England Open	Super 1000	(Japan) Akane Yamaguchi	26–24, 11–1 retired	(gold) Winner	
2024	Swiss Open	Super 300	(Indonesia) Gregoria Mariska Tunjung	21–19, 13–21, 22–20	(gold) Winner	

=== BWF Superseries (6 titles, 4 runners-up) ===
The BWF Superseries, which was launched on 14 December 2006 and implemented in 2007, was a series of elite badminton tournaments, sanctioned by the Badminton World Federation (BWF). BWF Superseries levels were Superseries and Superseries Premier. A season of Superseries consisted of twelve tournaments around the world that had been introduced since 2011. Successful players were invited to the Superseries Finals, which were held at the end of each year.

Women's singles
Year	Tournament	Opponent	Score	Result	Ref.
2014	Australian Open	(India) Saina Nehwal	18–21, 11–21	(silver) Runner-up	
2015	All England Open	(India) Saina Nehwal	16–21, 21–14, 21–7	(gold) Winner	
2015	Malaysia Open	(China) Li Xuerui	19–21, 21–19, 21–17	(gold) Winner	
2015	Australian Open	(China) Wang Shixian	22–20, 21–18	(gold) Winner	
2015	French Open	(China) Wang Shixian	21–18, 21–10	(gold) Winner	
2015	Hong Kong Open	(Japan) Nozomi Okuhara	21–17, 18–21, 22–20	(gold) Winner	
2017	India Open	(India) P. V. Sindhu	19–21, 16–21	(silver) Runner-up	
2017	Malaysia Open	(Chinese Taipei) Tai Tzu-ying	25–23, 20–22, 13–21	(silver) Runner-up	
2017	Singapore Open	(Chinese Taipei) Tai Tzu-ying	15–21, 15–21	(silver) Runner-up	
2017	Japan Open	(China) He Bingjiao	23–21, 21–12	(gold) Winner	

BWF Super Series Finals tournament
BWF Super Series Premier tournament
BWF Super Series tournament

=== BWF Grand Prix (2 titles, 3 runners-up) ===
The BWF Grand Prix had two levels, the Grand Prix and Grand Prix Gold. It was a series of badminton tournaments sanctioned by the Badminton World Federation (BWF) and played between 2007 and 2017.

Women's singles
Year	Tournament	Opponent	Score	Result	Ref.
2013	London Grand Prix Gold	(Scotland) Kirsty Gilmour	21–19, 21–9	(gold) Winner	
2013	Scottish Open	(Scotland) Kirsty Gilmour	21–14, 11–21, 21–13	(gold) Winner	
2015	Syed Modi International	(India) Saina Nehwal	21–19, 23–25, 16–21	(silver) Runner-up	
2015	German Open	(South Korea) Sung Ji-hyun	15–21, 21–14, 6–21	(silver) Runner-up	
2017	German Open	(Japan) Akane Yamaguchi	Walkover	(silver) Runner-up	

BWF Grand Prix Gold tournament
BWF Grand Prix tournament

=== BWF International Challenge/Series (9 titles, 5 runners-up) ===
Women's singles
Year	Tournament	Opponent	Score	Result	Ref.
2009	Cyprus International	(Slovenia) Špela Silvester	21–23, 21–23	(silver) Runner-up	
2009	Irish International	(Netherlands) Rachel van Cutsen	22–24, 21–14, 21–16	(gold) Winner	
2010	Uganda International	(Greece) Anne Hald Jensen	21–18, 19–21, 21–18	(gold) Winner	
2010	Cyprus International	(Russia) Olga Golovanova	21–12, 25–27, 21–14	(gold) Winner	
2010	Italian International	(Germany) Olga Konon	20–22, 14–21	(silver) Runner-up	
2011	Morocco International	(Germany) Juliane Schenk	21–17, 21–13	(gold) Winner	
2011	Spanish Open	(Germany) Olga Konon	21–13, 21–14	(gold) Winner	
2011	Irish International	(Chinese Taipei) Pai Hsiao-ma	21–12, 19–21, 7–21	(silver) Runner-up	
2013	Swedish Masters	(Switzerland) Nicole Schaller	21–6, 21–10	(gold) Winner	
2013	Finnish Open	(Spain) Beatriz Corrales	21–10, 21–15	(gold) Winner	
2013	Spanish Open	(Spain) Beatriz Corrales	19–21, 18–21	(silver) Runner-up	
2013	Italian International	(Switzerland) Sabrina Jaquet	21–15, 21–14	(gold) Winner	
2014	Spanish Open	(Scotland) Kirsty Gilmour	19–21, 18–21	(silver) Runner-up	
2019	Italian International	(India) Rituparna Das	21–19, 21–14	(gold) Winner	

BWF International Challenge tournament
BWF International Series tournament

== Performance timeline ==
Key

W	Won	F	Finalist	SF	Semi-finalist
QF	Quarter-finalist	#R	Rounds 4, 3, 2, 1	RR	Round-robin stage
Q#	Qualification round	A	Absent	w/d	Withdrew
G	Gold	S	Silver	B	Bronze
NH	Not held	N/A	Not applicable	DNQ	Did not qualify

=== National team ===
- Senior level

Team events	2009	2010	2011	2012	2013	2014	2015	2016	2017	2018	2019	2020	2021	2022	2023	2024	Ref
European Women's Team Championships	NH	RR	NH	RR	NH	QF	NH	B	NH	B	NH	RR	NH			S	
European Mixed Team Championships	RR	NH	RR	NH	RR	NH	w/d	NH	RR	NH	RR	NH	DNQ	NH	DNQ	NH	
Uber Cup	NH	DNQ	NH	DNQ	NH	DNQ	NH	RR	NH	w/d	NH	A	NH	RR	NH	w/d	
Sudirman Cup	A	NH	A	NH	A	NH	17th	NH	w/d	NH	A	NH	DNQ	NH	DNQ	NH	

=== Individual competitions ===
- Junior level

Event	2009	2010	2011	Ref
European U-17 Championships	G	NH	A	
European Junior Championships	S	NH	G	
World Junior Championships	A	QF	B	

- Senior level

Events	2011	2012	2013	2014	2015	2016	2017	2018	2019	2020	2021	2022	2023	2024	Ref
European Championships	NH	QF	NH	G	NH	G	G	G	Not Held		G	G	NH	G	
European Games	NH				A	NH			A	NH			G	NH	
World Championships	3R	NH	QF	G	G	NH	QF	G	inj	NH	w/d	QF	S	NH	
Olympic Games	NH	RR	NH			G	NH			inj	NH			4th	

Tournament	BWF Superseries / Grand Prix								BWF World Tour							Best	Ref
Tournament	2010	2011	2012	2013	2014	2015	2016	2017	2018	2019	2020	2021	2022	2023	2024	Best	Ref
Malaysia Open	A		1R	A	1R	W	QF	F	QF	A	Not Held		2R	QF	w/d	W ('15)	
India Open	A					SF	w/d	F	QF	A	Not Held		A	QF	w/d	F ('17)	
Indonesia Masters	A							NH	QF	F	F	A	w/d	F	w/d	F ('19, '20, '23)	
Thailand Masters	Not Held						A				SF	Not Held		w/d	A	SF ('20)	
German Open	A		2R	1R	SF	F	w/d	F	A		Not Held		w/d	A		F ('15, '17)	
French Open	A		1R	A	w/d	W	w/d	2R	w/d	F	NH	A	F	QF	1R	W ('15)	
All England Open	A		1R	1R	1R	W	SF	QF	QF	A	SF	A		QF	W	W ('15, '24)	
Orléans Masters	Not Held		A								NH	A		W	A	W ('23)	
Swiss Open	A	2R	A								NH	W	A		W	W ('21, '24)	
Spain Masters	Not Held								w/d	A	F	w/d	NH	SF	w/d	F ('20)	
Malaysia Masters	A								SF	F	SF	NH	w/d	A		F ('19)	
Thailand Open	NH	A	1R	A	NH	A					W	NH	A	SF	A	W ('20 I, '20 II)	
Thailand Open	NH	A	1R	A	NH	A					W	NH	A	SF	A	W ('20 I, '20 II)	
Singapore Open	A			2R	A		QF	F	A		Not Held		A	2R	QF	F ('17)	
Indonesia Open	A		2R	QF	2R	1R	SF	1R	1R	A	NH	A	2R	F	SF	F ('23)	
Chinese Taipei Open	1R	A									Not Held		A			1R ('10)	
Korea Open	A		1R	A	2R	A	w/d	w/d	A		Not Held		A			2R ('14)	
Japan Open	A				QF	QF	w/d	W	W	A	Not held		QF	A		W ('17, '18)	
Vietnam Open	A									1R	Not Held		A			1R ('19)	
Canada Open	A	2R	A	SF	A						Not Held		SF	A		SF ('13, '22)	
U.S. Open	A	2R	A	1R	A						Not Held			A		2R ('11)	
Denmark Open	A	1R	A			SF	SF	1R	1R	SF	F	A	2R	F	A	F ('20, '23)	
Hylo Open	A		SF	w/d	SF	w/d	A			w/d	SF	A	QF	w/d	A	SF ('12, '14, '20)	
Hong Kong Open	A	2R	A		SF	W	SF	2R	QF	A	Not Held			QF	A	W ('15)	
Australian Open	A				F	W	w/d	1R	A		Not Held		A			W ('15)	
China Open	A	1R	A		1R	QF	QF	SF	W	W	Not Held			QF	A	W ('18, '19)	
Japan Masters	NH													QF	A	QF ('23)	
China Masters	A								SF	1R	Not Held			1R	A	SF ('18)	
Syed Modi International	A			NH	A	F	A			W	Not Held		A			W ('19)	
Superseries / Tour Finals	DNQ					SF	RR	w/d	w/d	DNQ	F	DNQ		F	DNQ	F ('20, '23)	
London Grand Prix Gold	Not Held			W	Not Held											W ('13)	
Scottish Open	A			W	A					N/A	NH	N/A	NH	N/A		W ('13)	
Year-end ranking	80	26	34	15	8	1	2	4	6	10	6	6	9	5	10	1	
Tournament	2010	2011	2012	2013	2014	2015	2016	2017	2018	2019	2020	2021	2022	2023	2024	Best	Ref

== Career overview ==
The table below gives the overview of Carolina Marín's performance data in singles and doubles.

Singles	Played	Wins	Losses	Balance
Total	626	487	139	+348
Current year (2023)	70	55	15	+40

Doubles	Played	Wins	Losses	Balance
Total	27	16	11	+5
Current year (2023)	0	0	0	0

== Record against selected opponents ==
Record against year-end Finals finalists, World Championships semi-finalists, and Olympic quarter-finalists. Accurate as of 24 November 2024.

Players	Matches	Results		Difference
Players	Matches	Won	Lost	Difference
(Bulgaria) Petya Nedelcheva	1	1	0	+1
(China) Chen Yufei	13	6	7	–1
(China) Han Yue	5	4	1	+3
(China) He Bingjiao	10	7	3	+4
(China) Li Xuerui	6	3	3	0
(China) Wang Shixian	9	4	5	–1
(China) Wang Xin	2	0	2	–2
(China) Wang Yihan	7	3	4	–1
(China) Wang Zhiyi	3	2	1	+1
(China) Zhang Yiman	6	5	1	+4
(Chinese Taipei) Cheng Shao-chieh	2	1	1	0
(Chinese Taipei) Tai Tzu-ying	24	12	12	0
(Denmark) Tine Baun	3	1	2	–1
(France) Pi Hongyan	1	0	1	–1
(Germany) Juliane Schenk	2	2	0	+2

Players	Matches	Results		Difference
Players	Matches	Won	Lost	Difference
(Hong Kong) Yip Pui Yin	5	5	0	+5
(India) Saina Nehwal	13	7	6	+1
(India) P. V. Sindhu	17	12	5	+7
(Indonesia) Lindaweni Fanetri	4	2	2	0
(Indonesia) Gregoria Mariska Tunjung	4	2	2	0
(Japan) Minatsu Mitani	7	7	0	+7
(Japan) Aya Ohori	3	2	1	+1
(Japan) Nozomi Okuhara	17	9	8	+1
(Japan) Akane Yamaguchi	17	10	7	+3
(South Korea) An Se-young	10	4	6	–2
(South Korea) Bae Yeon-ju	1	1	0	+1
(South Korea) Sung Ji-hyun	9	8	1	+7
(Thailand) Porntip Buranaprasertsuk	3	2	1	+1
(Thailand) Ratchanok Intanon	13	6	7	–1

== Books ==
- with Fernando Rivas: Gana el partido de tu vida. Editorial Planeta, 2016
- #Puedo porque pienso que puedo. HarperCollins, 2020
