= Badminton at the 2016 Summer Olympics – Women's singles =

Women's singles at the Games of the XXXI Olympiad
- Venue: Riocentro – Pavilion 4
- Date: 11–19 August
- Competitors: 40 from 35 nations

Medalists
1st place, gold medalist(s)		Carolina Marín	Spain
2nd place, silver medalist(s)		P. V. Sindhu	India
3rd place, bronze medalist(s)		Nozomi Okuhara	Japan

The badminton women's singles tournament at the 2016 Summer Olympics took place from 11 to 20 August at Riocentro - Pavilion 4. The seeding was decided on 21 July 2016.

Spain's Carolina Marín defeated India's P. V. Sindhu in the final, 19–21, 21–12, 21–15, to win the gold medal in women's singles badminton at the 2016 Summer Olympics. This was the first medal of any colour for Spain in Olympic badminton, the first and only gold medal for a female non-Asian player. This was India's second consecutive medal in the event, after Saina Nehwal became the first Olympic badminton medalist from India in 2012. Nozomi Okuhara of Japan won the bronze medal after reigning gold medalist Li Xuerui from China was forced to withdraw due to a knee injury. This marked the first time that China failed to make to the podium in Olympics badminton since 1996.

== Competition format ==
The tournament started with a group phase round-robin followed by a knockout stage.

== Seeds ==
A total of 13 players were given seeds.

1. Carolina Marín (ESP) (gold medalist)
2. Wang Yihan (CHN) (quarter-finals)
3. Li Xuerui (CHN) (fourth place)
4. Ratchanok Intanon (THA) (round of 16)
5. Saina Nehwal (IND) (group stage)
6. Nozomi Okuhara (JPN) (bronze medalist)
7. Sung Ji-hyun (KOR) (quarter-finals)
8. Tai Tzu-ying (TPE) (round of 16)
9. P. V. Sindhu (IND) (silver medalist)
10. Akane Yamaguchi (JPN) (quarter-finals)
11. Kirsty Gilmour (GBR) (group stage)
12. Porntip Buranaprasertsuk (THA) (quarter-finals)
13. Bae Yeon-ju (KOR) (round of 16)

== Results ==
=== Group stage ===
==== Group A ====
Athlete	Pld	W	L	SW	SL	Pts
Carolina Marín (ESP)	2	2	0	4	0	2
Line Kjærsfeldt (DEN)	2	1	1	2	2	1
Nanna Vainio (FIN)	2	0	2	0	4	0

Athlete 1	Score	Athlete 2
11 August, 11:55
Carolina Marín (ESP)	21–6; 21–4	Nanna Vainio (FIN)
12 August, 15:30
Line Kjærsfeldt (DEN)	21–9; 21–8	Nanna Vainio (FIN)
13 August, 19:30
Carolina Marín (ESP)	21–16; 21–13	Line Kjærsfeldt (DEN)

==== Group C ====
Athlete	Pld	W	L	SW	SL	Pts
Sung Ji-hyun (KOR)	2	2	0	4	0	2
Liang Xiaoyu (SIN)	2	1	1	2	2	1
Delphine Lansac (FRA)	2	0	2	0	4	0

Athlete 1	Score	Athlete 2
12 August, 10:45
Sung Ji-hyun (KOR)	21–13; 21–14	Delphine Lansac (FRA)
13 August, 09:35
Liang Xiaoyu (SIN)	21–7; 21–15	Delphine Lansac (FRA)
14 August, 09:40
Sung Ji-hyun (KOR)	21–17; 21–11	Liang Xiaoyu (SIN)

==== Group D ====
Athlete	Pld	W	L	SW	SL	Pts
Linda Zechiri (BUL)	2	2	0	4	1	2
Kirsty Gilmour (GBR)	2	1	1	3	2	1
Sabrina Jaquet (SUI)	2	0	2	0	4	0

Athlete 1	Score	Athlete 2
11 August, 21:05
Kirsty Gilmour (GBR)	21–17; 21–15	Sabrina Jaquet (SUI)
13 August, 21:05
Linda Zechiri (BUL)	21–17; 21–15	Sabrina Jaquet (SUI)
14 August, 19:30
Kirsty Gilmour (GBR)	21–12; 17–21; 16–21	Linda Zechiri (BUL)

==== Group E ====
Athlete	Pld	W	L	SW	SL	Pts
Li Xuerui (CHN)	3	3	0	6	0	3
Iris Wang (USA)	3	2	1	4	4	2
Lianne Tan (BEL)	3	1	2	3	4	1
Telma Santos (POR)	3	0	3	1	6	0

Athlete 1	Score	Athlete 2
11 August, 19:55
Iris Wang (USA)	21–17; 20–22; 21–14	Lianne Tan (BEL)
11 August, 19:55
Li Xuerui (CHN)	21–12; 21–7	Telma Santos (POR)
12 August, 19:30
Iris Wang (USA)	18–21; 21–10; 21–12	Telma Santos (POR)
12 August, 20:30
Li Xuerui (CHN)	21–11; 21–11	Lianne Tan (BEL)
14 August, 15:55
Li Xuerui (CHN)	21–16; 21–12	Iris Wang (USA)
14 August, 19:55
Lianne Tan (BEL)	21–16; 21–18	Telma Santos (POR)

==== Group G ====
Athlete	Pld	W	L	SW	SL	Pts
Marija Ulitina (UKR)	2	2	0	4	0	2
Saina Nehwal (IND)	2	1	1	2	2	1
Lohaynny Vicente (BRA)	2	0	2	0	4	0

Athlete 1	Score	Athlete 2
11 August, 11:20
Saina Nehwal (IND)	21–17; 21–17	Lohaynny Vicente (BRA)
13 August, 11:55
Marija Ulitina (UKR)	21–13; 21–13	Lohaynny Vicente (BRA)
14 August, 08:55
Saina Nehwal (IND)	18–21; 19–21	Marija Ulitina (UKR)

==== Group H ====
Athlete	Pld	W	L	SW	SL	Pts
Porntip Buranaprasertsuk (THA)	2	2	0	4	0	2
Kate Foo Kune (MRI)	2	1	1	2	2	1
Wendy Chen Hsuan-yu (AUS)	2	0	2	0	4	0

Athlete 1	Score	Athlete 2
11 August, 20:30
Porntip Buranaprasertsuk (THA)	21–14; 21–15	Wendy Chen Hsuan-yu (AUS)
13 August, 19:55
Kate Foo Kune (MRI)	21–16; 21–19	Wendy Chen Hsuan-yu (AUS)
14 August, 21:05
Porntip Buranaprasertsuk (THA)	21–7; 21–18	Kate Foo Kune (MRI)

==== Group I ====
Athlete	Pld	W	L	SW	SL	Pts
Bae Yeon-ju (KOR)	2	2	0	4	0	2
Özge Bayrak (TUR)	2	1	1	2	2	1
Jeanine Cicognini (ITA)	2	0	2	0	4	0

Athlete 1	Score	Athlete 2
12 August, 19:55
Bae Yeon-ju (KOR)	21–11; 21–8	Jeanine Cicognini (ITA)
13 August, 15:30
Özge Bayrak (TUR)	21–14; 21–9	Jeanine Cicognini (ITA)
14 August, 16:40
Bae Yeon-ju (KOR)	21–11; 21–7	Özge Bayrak (TUR)

==== Group J ====
Athlete	Pld	W	L	SW	SL	Pts
Nozomi Okuhara (JPN)	2	2	0	4	0	2
Vũ Thị Trang (VIE)	2	1	1	2	2	1
Lindaweni Fanetri (INA)	2	0	2	0	4	0

Athlete 1	Score	Athlete 2
12 August, 08:00
Nozomi Okuhara (JPN)	21–10; 21–8	Vũ Thị Trang (VIE)
13 August, 11:20
Lindaweni Fanetri (INA)	12–21; 11–21	Vũ Thị Trang (VIE)
14 August, 10:05
Nozomi Okuhara (JPN)	21–12; 21–12	Lindaweni Fanetri (INA)

==== Group K ====
Athlete	Pld	W	L	SW	SL	Pts
Akane Yamaguchi (JPN)	2	2	0	4	1	2
Tee Jing Yi (MAS)	2	1	1	2	2	1
Kristína Gavnholt (CZE)	2	0	2	1	4	0

Athlete 1	Score	Athlete 2
12 August, 10:45
Akane Yamaguchi (JPN)	20–22; 21–12; 21–15	Kristína Gavnholt (CZE)
13 August, 08:25
Tee Jing Yi (MAS)	22–20; 21–15	Kristína Gavnholt (CZE)
14 August, 08:30
Akane Yamaguchi (JPN)	21–18; 21–5	Tee Jing Yi (MAS)

==== Group L ====
Athlete	Pld	W	L	SW	SL	Pts
Ratchanok Intanon (THA)	2	2	0	4	0	2
Kati Tolmoff (EST)	2	1	1	2	3	1
Yip Pui Yin (HKG)	2	0	2	1	4	0

Athlete 1	Score	Athlete 2
11 August, 08:25
Ratchanok Intanon (THA)	21–14; 21–13	Kati Tolmoff (EST)
12 August, 09:00
Yip Pui Yin (HKG)	21–5; 13–21; 19–21	Kati Tolmoff (EST)
14 August, 08:30
Ratchanok Intanon (THA)	21–18; 21–12	Yip Pui Yin (HKG)

==== Group M ====
Athlete	Pld	W	L	SW	SL	Pts
P. V. Sindhu (IND)	2	2	0	4	1	2
Michelle Li (CAN)	2	1	1	3	2	1
Laura Sárosi (HUN)	2	0	2	0	4	0

Athlete 1	Score	Athlete 2
11 August, 10:10
P. V. Sindhu (IND)	21–8; 21–9	Laura Sárosi (HUN)
13 August, 16:40
Michelle Li (CAN)	21–11; 21–8	Laura Sárosi (HUN)
14 August, 11:15
P. V. Sindhu (IND)	19–21; 21–15; 21–17	Michelle Li (CAN)

==== Group N ====
Athlete	Pld	W	L	SW	SL	Pts
Tai Tzu-ying (TPE)	2	2	0	4	0	2
Natalia Perminova (RUS)	2	1	1	2	2	1
Elisabeth Baldauf (AUT)	2	0	2	0	4	0

Athlete 1	Score	Athlete 2
11 August, 11:20
Tai Tzu-ying (TPE)	21–11; 21–9	Elisabeth Baldauf (AUT)
13 August, 19:30
Natalia Perminova (RUS)	21–17; 21–8	Elisabeth Baldauf (AUT)
14 August, 20:30
Tai Tzu-ying (TPE)	21–12; 21–9	Natalia Perminova (RUS)

==== Group P ====
Athlete	Pld	W	L	SW	SL	Pts
Wang Yihan (CHN)	2	2	0	4	0	2
Karin Schnaase (GER)	2	1	1	2	2	1
Chloe Magee (IRL)	2	0	2	0	4	0

Athlete 1	Score	Athlete 2
11 August, 09:00
Wang Yihan (CHN)	21–7; 21–12	Chloe Magee (IRL)
12 August, 21:05
Karin Schnaase (GER)	21–14; 21–19	Chloe Magee (IRL)
14 August, 15:30
Wang Yihan (CHN)	21–11; 21–16	Karin Schnaase (GER)

=== Knockout ===
Round of 16
Sung Ji-hyun (KOR)	21	21
Linda Zechiri (BUL)	15	12
Marija Ulitina (UKR)	14	16
Porntip Buranaprasertsuk (THA)	21	21
Bae Yeon-ju (KOR)	6	7
Nozomi Okuhara (JPN)	21	21
Akane Yamaguchi (JPN)	21	21
Ratchanok Intanon (THA)	19	16
P. V. Sindhu (IND)	21	21
Tai Tzu-ying (TPE)	13	15

Quarter-finals
Carolina Marín (ESP)	21	21
Sung Ji-hyun (KOR)	12	16
Li Xuerui (CHN)	21	21
Porntip Buranaprasertsuk (THA)	12	17
Nozomi Okuhara (JPN)	11	21	21
Akane Yamaguchi (JPN)	21	17	10
P. V. Sindhu (IND)	22	21
Wang Yihan (CHN)	20	19

Semi-finals
Carolina Marín (ESP)	21	21
Li Xuerui (CHN)	14	16
Nozomi Okuhara (JPN)	19	10
P. V. Sindhu (IND)	21	21

Gold medal match
Carolina Marín (ESP)	19	21	21
P. V. Sindhu (IND)	21	12	15
Bronze-medal match
Li Xuerui (CHN)
Nozomi Okuhara (JPN)	w/o^{1}

^{1} The match was scratched and Okuhara was awarded the bronze medal as Li was unable to compete due to suffering a torn anterior cruciate ligament (ACL) and lateral meniscus in the semi-final.
