= Delphine Lansac =

French badminton player (born 1995)

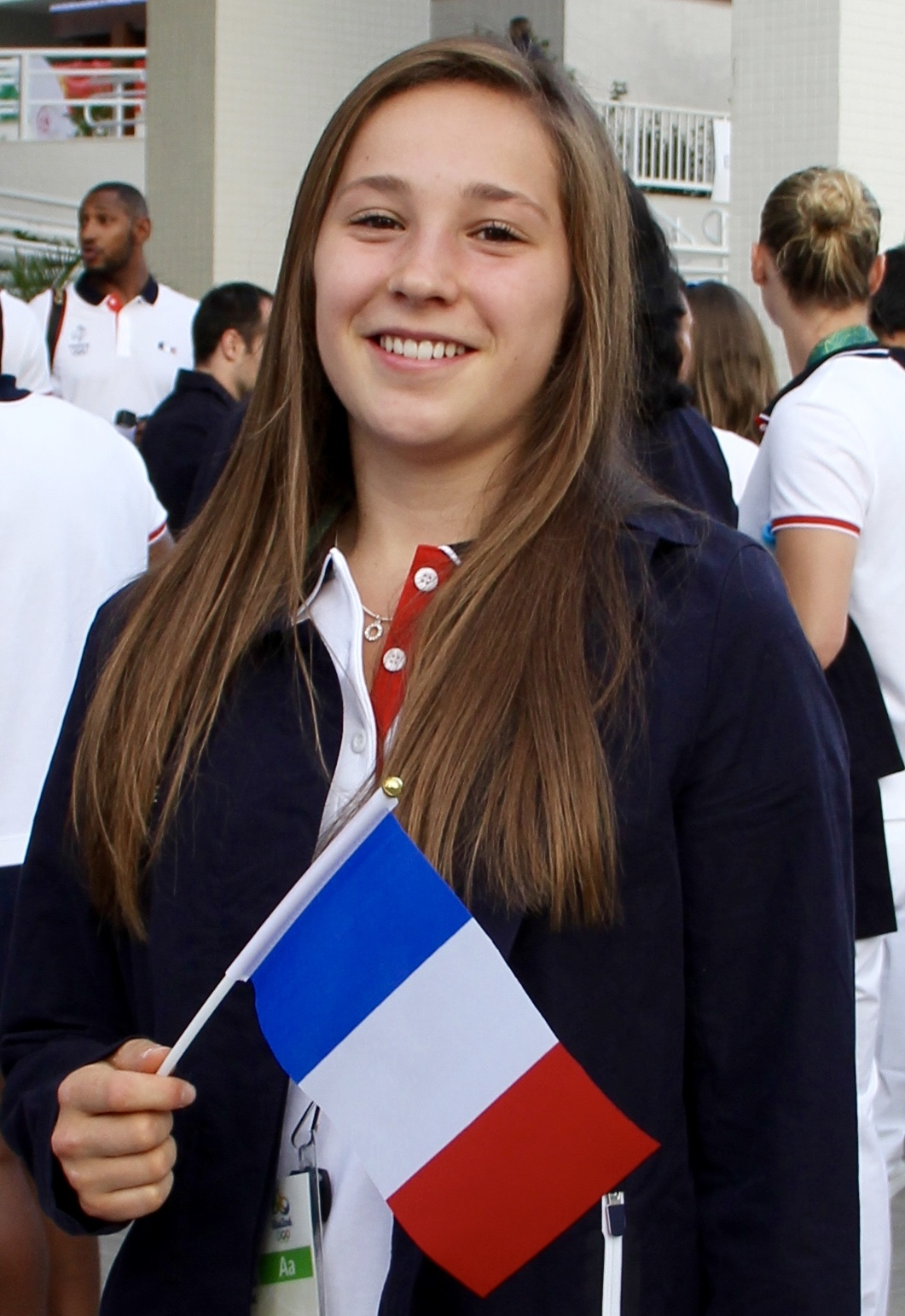

Personal information
- Born: 18 July 1995 (age 31) Lyon, France
- Height: 1.69 m (5 ft 7 in)

Sport
- Country: France
- Sport: Badminton

Women's singles & doubles
- Highest ranking: 49 (WS 14 April 2016); 36 (WD 15 October 2015)
- BWF profile
Medal record
Women's badminton
Representing France
European Junior Championships
Silver medal – second place	2013 Ankara	Mixed team
Bronze medal – third place	2013 Ankara	Girls' singles

Delphine Lansac (born 18 July 1995) is a French badminton player. She participated in the 2015 BWF World Championships in women's singles and women's doubles (with Émilie Lefel). In 2016, she competed at the Summer Olympic Games held in Rio de Janeiro, Brazil. In the group stage, she was defeated by Liang Xiaoyu 21-7-21-15, and by Sung Ji-hyun 21-13, 21-14.

== Achievements ==
=== European Junior Championships ===
Girls' singles
Year	Venue	Opponent	Score	Result
2013	ASKI Sport Hall, Ankara, Turkey	(Bulgaria) Stefani Stoeva	18–21, 8–21	Bronze

=== BWF International Challenge/Series ===
Women's singles
Year	Tournament	Opponent	Score	Result
2013	Irish Future Series	(Hungary) Laura Sárosi	21–16, 21–17	(gold) Winner
2014	Romanian International	(Hungary) Laura Sárosi	22–20, 21–14	(gold) Winner
2016	Polish Open	(Turkey) Neslihan Yiğit	21–19, 21–11	(gold) Winner
2017	Estonian International	(Russia) Ksenia Polikarpova	21–15, 21–14	(gold) Winner

Women's doubles
Year	Tournament	Partner	Opponent	Score	Result
2015	Finnish Open	(France) Émilie Lefel	(England) Heather Olver (England) Lauren Smith	13–21, 21–23	(silver) Runner-up
2015	Peru International	(France) Émilie Lefel	(Turkey) Özge Bayrak (Turkey) Neslihan Yiğit	14–21, 21–14, 21–13	(gold) Winner

BWF International Challenge tournament
BWF International Series tournament
BWF Future Series tournament
