= 2023 Sudirman Cup group stage =

Badminton championship in China

The 2023 Sudirman Cup group stage was held at the Suzhou Olympic Sports Centre in Suzhou, China, from 14 to 18 May 2023.

The group stage was the first stage of the 2023 Sudirman Cup. During the group stage, only the 2 highest-placing teams in all 4 groups advanced to the knockout stage.

== Draw ==
The draw for the tournament was conducted on 25 March 2023, at 15:00 CST, at Suzhou City in Suzhou, China. The 16 teams were drawn into four groups of four.

The teams were allocated to four pots based on the World Team Rankings of 21 February 2023. Pot 1 contained the top seed China (which were assigned to position A1), the second seed Japan (which were assigned to position D1) and the next two best teams, Indonesia and Malaysia. Pot 2 contained the next best four teams and Pot 3 contained the ninth to sixteenth seeds.

Pot 1	Pot 2	Pot 3	Pot 4
China; Japan; Indonesia; Malaysia	Thailand; South Korea; Denmark; Chinese Taipei	India; Singapore; Germany; France	Canada; England; Egypt; Australia

=== Group composition ===
Group
Group A	Group B	Group C	Group D
China (Host); Denmark; Singapore; Egypt	Indonesia; Thailand; Germany; Canada	Malaysia; Chinese Taipei; India; Australia	Japan; South Korea; France; England

== Group A ==
Pos	Team	Pld	W	L	MF	MA	MD	GF	GA	GD	PF	PA	PD	Pts	Qualification	People's Republic of China	Denmark	Singapore	Egypt
1	China (H)	3	3	0	15	0	+15	30	3	+27	686	397	+289	3	Advance to quarter-finals	—	5–0	5–0	5–0
2	Denmark	3	2	1	9	6	+3	20	13	+7	609	501	+108	2	Advance to quarter-finals		—	4–1	5–0
3	Singapore	3	1	2	6	9	−3	14	18	−4	548	536	+12	1				—	5–0
4	Egypt	3	0	3	0	15	−15	0	30	−30	221	630	−409	0					—

Source: TournamentSoftware.com
Rules for classification: Tiebreakers
(H) Host

=== Denmark vs Singapore ===
Denmark
4
Suzhou Olympic Sports Centre Court 2
14 May 2023, 17:00 UTC+8

Singapore
1

			1	2	3
1	(Denmark) (Singapore)	Mathias Christiansen / Alexandra Bøje; Terry Hee / Jessica Tan	21; 19	21; 18
2	(Denmark) (Singapore)	Viktor Axelsen; Loh Kean Yew	21; 23	21; 13	21; 16
3	(Denmark) (Singapore)	Mia Blichfeldt; Yeo Jia Min	21; 10	21; 15
4	(Denmark) (Singapore)	Kim Astrup / Anders Skaarup Rasmussen; Andy Kwek / Loh Kean Hean	21; 13	21; 5
5	(Denmark) (Singapore)	Maiken Fruergaard / Sara Thygesen; Jin Yujia / Crystal Wong	18; 21	18; 21

=== China vs Egypt ===
China
5
Suzhou Olympic Sports Centre Court 3
14 May 2023, 17:00 UTC+8

Egypt
0

			1	2	3
1	(China) (Egypt)	Feng Yanzhe / Huang Dongping; Ahmed Salah / Hana Tarek Zaher	21; 3	21; 8
2	(China) (Egypt)	Shi Yuqi; Adham Hatem Elgamal	21; 11	21; 13
3	(China) (Egypt)	Chen Yufei; Rahma Mohamed Saad Eladawy	21; 2	21; 3
4	(China) (Egypt)	Liu Yuchen / Ou Xuanyi; Kareem Ezzat / Mahmoud Montaser	21; 6	21; 7
5	(China) (Egypt)	Zhang Shuxian / Zheng Yu; Nour Ahmad Youssri / Doha Hany	21; 2	21; 4

=== China vs Singapore ===
China
5
Suzhou Olympic Sports Centre Court 1
16 May 2023, 17:00 UTC+8

Singapore
0

			1	2	3
1	(China) (Singapore)	Zheng Siwei / Huang Yaqiong; Terry Hee / Jessica Tan	22; 20	21; 19
2	(China) (Singapore)	Shi Yuqi; Jason Teh	21; 10	21; 17
3	(China) (Singapore)	He Bingjiao; Yeo Jia Min	22; 20	21; 15
4	(China) (Singapore)	Liang Weikeng / Wang Chang; Andy Kwek / Loh Kean Hean	19; 21	21; 13	21; 14
5	(China) (Singapore)	Chen Qingchen / Jia Yifan; Jin Yujia / Crystal Wong	21; 7	21; 8

=== Denmark vs Egypt ===
Denmark
5
Suzhou Olympic Sports Centre Court 2
16 May 2023, 17:00 UTC+8

Egypt
0

			1	2	3
1	(Denmark) (Egypt)	Rasmus Gemke; Adham Hatem Elgamal	21; 9	21; 5
2	(Denmark) (Egypt)	Line Christophersen; Nour Ahmed Youssri	21; 8	21; 10
3	(Denmark) (Egypt)	Kim Astrup / Lasse Mølhede; Kareem Ezzat / Mahmoud Montaser	21; 8	21; 11
4	(Denmark) (Egypt)	Maiken Fruergaard / Sara Thygesen; Rahma El Adawy / Hana Tarek Zaher	21; 1	21; 7
5	(Denmark) (Egypt)	Mathias Thyrri / Amalie Magelund; Adham Hatem Elgamal / Doha Hany	21; 17	21; 6

=== China vs Denmark ===
China
5
Suzhou Olympic Sports Centre Court 1
18 May 2023, 17:00 UTC+8

Denmark
0

			1	2	3
1	(China) (Denmark)	Zheng Siwei / Huang Yaqiong; Mathias Thyrri / Amalie Magelund	21; 9	21; 19
2	(China) (Denmark)	Li Shifeng; Rasmus Gemke	21; 15	16; 21	21; 15
3	(China) (Denmark)	Chen Yufei; Line Christophersen	21; 8	21; 11
4	(China) (Denmark)	Liu Yuchen / Ou Xuanyi; Kim Astrup / Anders Skaarup Rasmussen	21; 14	19; 21	21; 11
5	(China) (Denmark)	Chen Qingchen / Jia Yifan; Maiken Fruergaard / Sara Thygesen	21; 16	21; 14

=== Singapore vs Egypt ===
Singapore
5
Suzhou Olympic Sports Centre Court 2
18 May 2023, 17:00 UTC+8

Egypt
0

			1	2	3
1	(Singapore) (Egypt)	Terry Hee / Jessica Tan; Ahmed Salah / Hana Tarek Zaher	21; 7	21; 9
2	(Singapore) (Egypt)	Yeo Jia Min; Doha Hany	21; 4	21; 1
3	(Singapore) (Egypt)	Loh Kean Yew; Adham Hatem Elgamal	21; 8	21; 13
4	(Singapore) (Egypt)	Jin Yujia / Crystal Wong; Nour Ahmad Youssri / Rahma Mohamed Saad Eladawy	21; 10	21; 8
5	(Singapore) (Egypt)	Terry Hee / Loh Kean Hean; Adham Hatem Elgamal / Ahmed Salah	21; 7	21; 13

== Group B ==
Pos	Team	Pld	W	L	MF	MA	MD	GF	GA	GD	PF	PA	PD	Pts	Qualification	Thailand	Indonesia	Canada	Germany
1	Thailand	3	3	0	11	4	+7	24	11	+13	672	565	+107	3	Advance to quarter-finals	—		4–1	4–1
2	Indonesia	3	2	1	11	4	+7	25	9	+16	675	564	+111	2	Advance to quarter-finals	2–3	—	5–0	4–1
3	Canada	3	1	2	4	11	−7	9	23	−14	534	642	−108	1				—	
4	Germany	3	0	3	4	11	−7	9	24	−15	546	656	−110	0				2–3	—

Source: TournamentSoftware.com
Rules for classification: Tiebreakers

=== Indonesia vs Canada ===
Indonesia
5
Suzhou Olympic Sports Centre Court 1
15 May 2023, 10:00 UTC+8

Canada
0

			1	2	3
1	(Indonesia) (Canada)	Adnan Maulana / Nita Violina Marwah; Adam Dong / Josephine Wu	22; 20	21; 15
2	(Indonesia) (Canada)	Anthony Sinisuka Ginting; Brian Yang	21; 17	21; 16
3	(Indonesia) (Canada)	Gregoria Mariska Tunjung; Talia Ng	21; 14	21; 13
4	(Indonesia) (Canada)	Marcus Fernaldi Gideon / Kevin Sanjaya Sukamuljo; Kevin Lee / Ty Alexander Lindeman	21; 16	21; 18
5	(Indonesia) (Canada)	Lanny Tria Mayasari / Ribka Sugiarto; Catherine Choi / Michelle Li	21; 11	21; 8

=== Thailand vs Germany ===
Thailand
4
Suzhou Olympic Sports Centre Court 2
15 May 2023, 10:00 UTC+8

Germany
1

			1	2	3
1	(Thailand) (Germany)	Dechapol Puavaranukroh / Sapsiree Taerattanachai; Mark Lamsfuß / Isabel Lohau	21; 13	21; 18
2	(Thailand) (Germany)	Kunlavut Vitidsarn; Kai Schäfer	21; 10	21; 18
3	(Thailand) (Germany)	Pornpawee Chochuwong; Yvonne Li	21; 7	21; 12
4	(Thailand) (Germany)	Supak Jomkoh / Kittinupong Kedren; Mark Lamsfuß / Marvin Seidel	12; 21	21; 13	12; 21
5	(Thailand) (Germany)	Jongkolphan Kititharakul / Rawinda Prajongjai; Stine Küspert / Emma Moszczynski	21; 13	21; 12

=== Indonesia vs Germany ===
Indonesia
4
Suzhou Olympic Sports Centre Court 1
16 May 2023, 10:00 UTC+8

Germany
1

			1	2	3
1	(Indonesia) (Germany)	Rinov Rivaldy / Pitha Haningtyas Mentari; Jones Ralfy Jansen / Linda Efler	21; 19	21; 7
2	(Indonesia) (Germany)	Jonatan Christie; Fabian Roth	21; 18	21; 17
3	(Indonesia) (Germany)	Gregoria Mariska Tunjung; Yvonne Li	21; 8	21; 14
4	(Indonesia) (Germany)	Leo Rolly Carnando / Daniel Marthin; Mark Lamsfuß / Marvin Seidel	21; 18	17; 21	19; 21
5	(Indonesia) (Germany)	Apriyani Rahayu / Siti Fadia Silva Ramadhanti; Stine Küspert / Emma Moszczynski	21; 15	25; 23

=== Thailand vs Canada ===
Thailand
4
Suzhou Olympic Sports Centre Court 2
16 May 2023, 10:00 UTC+8

Canada
1

			1	2	3
1	(Thailand) (Canada)	Supak Jomkoh / Supissara Paewsampran; Ty Alexander Lindeman / Josephine Wu	21; 16	21; 12
2	(Thailand) (Canada)	Kantaphon Wangcharoen; Brian Yang	17; 21	20; 22
3	(Thailand) (Canada)	Ratchanok Intanon; Michelle Li	21; 14	18; 21	22; 20
4	(Thailand) (Canada)	Kittinupong Kedren / Dechapol Puavaranukroh; Adam Dong / Nyl Yakura	21; 19	21; 8
5	(Thailand) (Canada)	Benyapa Aimsaard / Nuntakarn Aimsaard; Catherine Choi / Josephine Wu	21; 5	21; 14

=== Indonesia vs Thailand ===
Indonesia
2
Suzhou Olympic Sports Centre Court 1
18 May 2023, 10:00 UTC+8

Thailand
3

			1	2	3
1	(Indonesia) (Thailand)	Dejan Ferdinansyah / Gloria Emanuelle Widjaja; Dechapol Puavaranukroh / Sapsiree Taerattanachai	17; 21	19; 21
2	(Indonesia) (Thailand)	Jonatan Christie; Kunlavut Vitidsarn	21; 12	12; 21	20; 22
3	(Indonesia) (Thailand)	Putri Kusuma Wardani; Pornpawee Chochuwong	21; 15	14; 21	17; 21
4	(Indonesia) (Thailand)	Fajar Alfian / Muhammad Rian Ardianto; Supak Jomkoh / Kittinupong Kedren	21; 11	21; 19
5	(Indonesia) (Thailand)	Apriyani Rahayu / Siti Fadia Silva Ramadhanti; Jongkolphan Kititharakul / Rawinda Prajongjai	21; 17	19; 21	21; 13

=== Germany vs Canada ===
Germany
2
Suzhou Olympic Sports Centre Court 2
18 May 2023, 10:00 UTC+8

Canada
3

			1	2	3
1	(Germany) (Canada)	Mark Lamsfuß / Isabel Lohau; Ty Alexander Lindeman / Josephine Wu	21; 16	21; 19
2	(Germany) (Canada)	Fabian Roth; Brian Yang	15; 21	20; 22
3	(Germany) (Canada)	Yvonne Li; Michelle Li	21; 23	16; 21
4	(Germany) (Canada)	Malik Bourakkadi / Jones Ralfy Jansen; Adam Dong / Nyl Yakura	21; 13	12; 21	15; 21
5	(Germany) (Canada)	Linda Efler / Isabel Lohau; Catherine Choi / Josephine Wu	24; 22	21; 15

== Group C ==
Pos	Team	Pld	W	L	MF	MA	MD	GF	GA	GD	PF	PA	PD	Pts	Qualification	Malaysia	Chinese Taipei for Olympic games	India	Australia
1	Malaysia	3	3	0	14	1	+13	28	5	+23	661	514	+147	3	Advance to quarter-finals	—	4–1	5–0	5–0
2	Chinese Taipei	3	2	1	10	5	+5	23	13	+10	702	597	+105	2	Advance to quarter-finals		—	4–1	5–0
3	India	3	1	2	5	10	−5	15	21	−6	643	667	−24	1				—	4–1
4	Australia	3	0	3	1	14	−13	2	29	−27	413	641	−228	0					—

Source: TournamentSoftware.com
Rules for classification: Tiebreakers

=== Chinese Taipei vs India ===
Chinese Taipei
4
Suzhou Olympic Sports Centre Court 1
14 May 2023, 10:00 UTC+8

India
1

			1	2	3
1	(Chinese Taipei) (India)	Yang Po-hsuan / Hu Ling-fang; Sai Pratheek K. / Tanisha Crasto	18; 21	26; 24	21; 6
2	(Chinese Taipei) (India)	Chou Tien-chen; Prannoy H. S.	21; 19	21; 15
3	(Chinese Taipei) (India)	Tai Tzu-ying; P. V. Sindhu	21; 14	18; 21	21; 17
4	(Chinese Taipei) (India)	Lee Yang / Ye Hong-wei; Satwiksairaj Rankireddy / Chirag Shetty	21; 13	17; 21	21; 18
5	(Chinese Taipei) (India)	Lee Chia-hsin / Teng Chun-hsun; Treesa Jolly / Gayatri Gopichand	21; 15	18; 21	13; 21

=== Malaysia vs Australia ===
Malaysia
5
Suzhou Olympic Sports Centre Court 3
14 May 2023, 10:00 UTC+8

Australia
0

			1	2	3
1	(Malaysia) (Australia)	Goh Soon Huat / Shevon Jemie Lai; Kenneth Choo / Gronya Somerville	21; 17	21; 14
2	(Malaysia) (Australia)	Lee Zii Jia; Ricky Tang	21; 3	21; 13
3	(Malaysia) (Australia)	Letshanaa Karupathevan; Tiffany Ho	21; 19	21; 12
4	(Malaysia) (Australia)	Aaron Chia / Soh Wooi Yik; Rayne Wang / Jack Yu	21; 7	21; 14
5	(Malaysia) (Australia)	Pearly Tan / Thinaah Muralitharan; Kaitlyn Ea / Gronya Somerville	21; 12	21; 13

=== Chinese Taipei vs Australia ===
Chinese Taipei
5
Suzhou Olympic Sports Centre Court 3
15 May 2023, 10:00 UTC+8

Australia
0

			1	2	3
1	(Chinese Taipei) (Australia)	Ye Hong-wei / Lee Chia-hsin; Rayne Wang / Angela Yu	21; 11	21; 13
2	(Chinese Taipei) (Australia)	Chou Tien-chen; Nathan Tang	21; 13	21; 14
3	(Chinese Taipei) (Australia)	Hsu Wen-chi; Sydney Go	21; 7	21; 18
4	(Chinese Taipei) (Australia)	Lee Yang / Wang Chi-lin; Kenneth Choo / Rayne Wang	21; 7	21; 13
5	(Chinese Taipei) (Australia)	Hsu Ya-ching / Lin Wan-ching; Kaitlyn Ea / Angela Yu	21; 15	21; 14

=== Malaysia vs India ===
Malaysia
5
Suzhou Olympic Sports Centre Court 1
15 May 2023, 17:00 UTC+8

India
0

			1	2	3
1	(Malaysia) (India)	Goh Soon Huat / Shevon Jemie Lai; Dhruv Kapila / Ashwini Ponnappa	21; 16	21; 17
2	(Malaysia) (India)	Lee Zii Jia; Srikanth Kidambi	21; 16	21; 11
3	(Malaysia) (India)	Goh Jin Wei; P. V. Sindhu	14; 21	21; 10	22; 20
4	(Malaysia) (India)	Aaron Chia / Soh Wooi Yik; Satwiksairaj Rankireddy / Chirag Shetty	21; 18	21; 19
5	(Malaysia) (India)	Pearly Tan / Thinaah Muralitharan; Treesa Jolly / Gayatri Gopichand	21; 15	21; 13

=== Malaysia vs Chinese Taipei ===
Malaysia
4
Suzhou Olympic Sports Centre Court 1
17 May 2023, 10:00 UTC+8

Chinese Taipei
1

			1	2	3
1	(Malaysia) (Chinese Taipei)	Chen Tang Jie / Toh Ee Wei; Ye Hong-wei / Lee Chia-hsin	17; 21	21; 19	21; 17
2	(Malaysia) (Chinese Taipei)	Lee Zii Jia; Chou Tien-chen	21; 14	23; 21
3	(Malaysia) (Chinese Taipei)	Goh Jin Wei; Tai Tzu-ying	8; 21	10; 21
4	(Malaysia) (Chinese Taipei)	Ong Yew Sin / Teo Ee Yi; Lu Ching-yao / Yang Po-han	21; 8	23; 21
5	(Malaysia) (Chinese Taipei)	Pearly Tan / Thinaah Muralitharan; Hsu Ya-ching / Teng Chun-hsun	21; 15	19; 21	21; 15

=== India vs Australia ===
India
4
Suzhou Olympic Sports Centre Court 2
17 May 2023, 10:00 UTC+8

Australia
1

			1	2	3
1	(India) (Australia)	Sai Pratheek K. / Tanisha Crasto; Kenneth Choo / Gronya Somerville	21; 17	14; 21	18; 21
2	(India) (Australia)	Prannoy H. S. Jack Yu	21; 8	21; 8
3	(India) (Australia)	Anupama Upadhyaya; Tiffany Ho	21; 16	21; 18
4	(India) (Australia)	Arjun M. R. / Dhruv Kapila; Ricky Tang / Rayne Wang	21; 11	21; 12
5	(India) (Australia)	Tanisha Crasto / Ashwini Ponnappa; Kaitlyn Ea / Angela Yu	21; 19	21; 13

== Group D ==
Pos	Team	Pld	W	L	MF	MA	MD	GF	GA	GD	PF	PA	PD	Pts	Qualification	South Korea	Japan	France	England
1	South Korea	3	3	0	13	2	+11	27	6	+21	656	483	+173	3	Advance to quarter-finals	—	5–0	4–1	4–1
2	Japan	3	2	1	9	6	+3	19	13	+6	593	522	+71	2	Advance to quarter-finals		—	4–1	5–0
3	France	3	1	2	7	8	−1	15	18	−3	570	625	−55	1				—	5–0
4	England	3	0	3	1	14	−13	5	29	−24	486	675	−189	0					—

Source: TournamentSoftware.com
Rules for classification: Tiebreakers

=== South Korea vs France ===
South Korea
4
Suzhou Olympic Sports Centre Court 2
14 May 2023, 10:00 UTC+8

France
1

			1	2	3
1	(South Korea) (France)	Kim Won-ho / Jeong Na-eun; Thom Gicquel / Delphine Delrue	21; 18	21; 17
2	(South Korea) (France)	Lee Yun-gyu; Christo Popov	8; 21	18; 21
3	(South Korea) (France)	An Se-young; Qi Xuefei	21; 7	21; 14
4	(South Korea) (France)	Kang Min-hyuk / Seo Seung-jae; Lucas Corvée / Ronan Labar	21; 16	18; 21	21; 19
5	(South Korea) (France)	Kim So-yeong / Kong Hee-yong; Margot Lambert / Anne Tran	21; 8	21; 16

=== Japan vs England ===
Japan
5
Suzhou Olympic Sports Centre Court 1
14 May 2023, 17:00 UTC+8

England
0

			1	2	3
1	(Japan) (England)	Kyohei Yamashita / Naru Shinoya; Marcus Ellis / Lauren Smith	22; 20	21; 7
2	(Japan) (England)	Kanta Tsuneyama; Nadeem Dalvi	21; 10	21; 7
3	(Japan) (England)	Saena Kawakami; Lisa Curtin	21; 4	21; 7
4	(Japan) (England)	Akira Koga / Taichi Saito; Ben Lane / Sean Vendy	21; 18	21; 15
5	(Japan) (England)	Mayu Matsumoto / Wakana Nagahara; Chloe Birch / Lauren Smith	21; 17	13; 21	21; 11

=== Japan vs France ===
Japan
4
Suzhou Olympic Sports Centre Court 2
15 May 2023, 17:00 UTC+8

France
1

			1	2	3
1	(Japan) (France)	Yuta Watanabe / Arisa Higashino; Thom Gicquel / Delphine Delrue	27; 29	16; 21
2	(Japan) (France)	Kodai Naraoka; Alex Lanier	21; 17	21; 15
3	(Japan) (France)	Akane Yamaguchi; Léonice Huet	21; 13	21; 8
4	(Japan) (France)	Takuro Hoki / Yugo Kobayashi; Christo Popov / Toma Junior Popov	21; 19	21; 11
5	(Japan) (France)	Nami Matsuyama / Chiharu Shida; Margot Lambert / Anne Tran	21; 10	21; 13

=== South Korea vs England ===
South Korea
4
Suzhou Olympic Sports Centre Court 3
15 May 2023, 17:00 UTC+8

England
1

			1	2	3
1	(South Korea) (England)	Kim Won-ho / Chae Yoo-jung; Marcus Ellis / Lauren Smith	21; 16	21; 7
2	(South Korea) (England)	Jeon Hyeok-jin; Cholan Kayan	21; 13	21; 6
3	(South Korea) (England)	Kim Ga-eun; Freya Redfearn	21; 7	21; 8
4	(South Korea) (England)	Choi Sol-gyu / Na Sung-seung; Ben Lane / Sean Vendy	22; 20	12; 21	13; 21
5	(South Korea) (England)	Jeong Na-eun / Kim Hye-jeong; Chloe Birch / Estelle van Leeuwen	21; 17	21; 11

=== Japan vs South Korea ===
Japan
0
Suzhou Olympic Sports Centre Court 1
17 May 2023, 17:00 UTC+8

South Korea
5

			1	2	3
1	(Japan) (South Korea)	Yuta Watanabe / Arisa Higashino; Kim Won-ho / Jeong Na-eun	21; 19	15; 21	5; 21
2	(Japan) (South Korea)	Kenta Nishimoto; Jeon Hyeok-jin	11; 21	19; 21
3	(Japan) (South Korea)	Akane Yamaguchi; An Se-young	11; 21	15; 21
4	(Japan) (South Korea)	Takuro Hoki / Yugo Kobayashi; Kang Min-hyuk / Seo Seung-jae	18; 21	12; 21
5	(Japan) (South Korea)	Yuki Fukushima / Sayaka Hirota; Baek Ha-na / Lee So-hee	13; 21	18; 21

=== France vs England ===
France
5
Suzhou Olympic Sports Centre Court 2
17 May 2023, 17:00 UTC+8

England
0

			1	2	3
1	(France) (England)	Thom Gicquel / Delphine Delrue; Marcus Ellis / Lauren Smith	22; 20	21; 19
2	(France) (England)	Toma Junior Popov; Cholan Kayan	21; 13	14; 21	21; 17
3	(France) (England)	Qi Xuefei; Freya Redfearn	21; 11	21; 11
4	(France) (England)	Lucas Corvée / Ronan Labar; Ben Lane / Sean Vendy	21; 19	21; 19
5	(France) (England)	Margot Lambert / Anne Tran; Chloe Birch / Lauren Smith	21; 13	11; 21	21; 18
