= 2023 Sudirman Cup knockout stage =

Badminton competition in China

The 2023 Sudirman Cup knockout stage was held at the Suzhou Olympic Sports Centre in Suzhou, China, from 19 to 21 May 2023.

The knockout stage was the second and final stage of the competition, following the group stage. It began with the quarter-finals (19 May), followed by the semi-finals (20 May), and the final (21 May). The two highest-finished teams in 4 groups (8 teams in total) qualified to the knockout stage.

== Qualified teams ==
Group	Winners	Runners-up
A	China	Denmark
B	Thailand	Indonesia
C	Malaysia	Chinese Taipei
D	South Korea	Japan

== Bracket ==
The draw was held on 18 May 2023, after the last group tie. The group runners-up were drawn against the group winners. Teams from the same group could not be drawn against each other.

Quarter-finals
China	3
Indonesia	0
Thailand	2
Japan	3
Denmark	1
Malaysia	3
Chinese Taipei	1
South Korea	3

Semi-finals
China	3
Japan	2
Malaysia	1
South Korea	3

Final
China	3
South Korea	0

== Quarter-finals ==
=== China vs Indonesia ===
China
3
Suzhou Olympic Sports Centre Court 1
19 May 2023, 17:00 UTC+8

Indonesia
0

			1	2	3
1	(China) (Indonesia)	Zheng Siwei / Huang Yaqiong; Rinov Rivaldy / Gloria Emanuelle Widjaja	13; 21	23; 21	21; 11
2	(China) (Indonesia)	Shi Yuqi; Anthony Sinisuka Ginting	22; 20	21; 14
3	(China) (Indonesia)	Chen Yufei; Gregoria Mariska Tunjung	22; 20	21; 12
4	(China) (Indonesia)	Liang Weikeng / Wang Chang; Fajar Alfian / Muhammad Rian Ardianto				not played
5	(China) (Indonesia)	Chen Qingchen / Jia Yifan; Apriyani Rahayu / Siti Fadia Silva Ramadhanti				not played

=== Thailand vs Japan ===
Thailand
2
Suzhou Olympic Sports Centre Court 2
19 May 2023, 10:00 UTC+8

Japan
3

			1	2	3
1	(Thailand) (Japan)	Dechapol Puavaranukroh / Sapsiree Taerattanachai; Kyohei Yamashita / Naru Shinoya	21; 19	21; 23	13; 21
2	(Thailand) (Japan)	Pornpawee Chochuwong; Akane Yamaguchi	19; 21	21; 17	21; 11
3	(Thailand) (Japan)	Kunlavut Vitidsarn; Kodai Naraoka	21; 12	21; 13
4	(Thailand) (Japan)	Jongkolphan Kititharakul / Rawinda Prajongjai; Nami Matsuyama / Chiharu Shida	17; 21	22; 20	18; 21
5	(Thailand) (Japan)	Kittinupong Kedren / Dechapol Puavaranukroh; Takuro Hoki / Yugo Kobayashi	21; 19	10; 21	18; 21

=== Denmark vs Malaysia ===
Denmark
1
Suzhou Olympic Sports Centre Court 2
19 May 2023, 17:00 UTC+8

Malaysia
3

			1	2	3
1	(Denmark) (Malaysia)	Mathias Christiansen / Alexandra Bøje; Chen Tang Jie / Toh Ee Wei	21; 15	14; 21	7; 21
2	(Denmark) (Malaysia)	Viktor Axelsen; Lee Zii Jia	4; 4			retired
3	(Denmark) (Malaysia)	Mia Blichfeldt; Goh Jin Wei	21; 14	15; 21	21; 19
4	(Denmark) (Malaysia)	Kim Astrup / Anders Skaarup Rasmussen; Aaron Chia / Soh Wooi Yik	17; 21	16; 21
5	(Denmark) (Malaysia)	Alexandra Bøje / Maiken Fruergaard; Pearly Tan / Thinaah Muralitharan				not played

=== Chinese Taipei vs South Korea ===
Chinese Taipei
1
Suzhou Olympic Sports Centre Court 1
19 May 2023, 10:00 UTC+8

South Korea
3

			1	2	3
1	(Chinese Taipei) (South Korea)	Yang Po-hsuan / Hu Ling-fang; Seo Seung-jae / Chae Yoo-jung	17; 21	19; 21
2	(Chinese Taipei) (South Korea)	Chou Tien-chen; Lee Yun-gyu	21; 17	21; 16
3	(Chinese Taipei) (South Korea)	Tai Tzu-ying; An Se-young	13; 21	20; 22
4	(Chinese Taipei) (South Korea)	Lee Yang / Ye Hong-wei; Kim Won-ho / Na Sung-seung	19; 21	3; 11		retired
5	(Chinese Taipei) (South Korea)	Hsu Ya-ching / Teng Chun-hsun; Baek Ha-na / Lee So-hee				not played

== Semi-finals ==
=== China vs Japan ===
China
3
Suzhou Olympic Sports Centre Court 1
20 May 2023, 17:00 UTC+8

Japan
2

			1	2	3
1	(China) (Japan)	Feng Yanzhe / Huang Dongping; Kyohei Yamashita / Naru Shinoya	24; 26	21; 18	22; 24
2	(China) (Japan)	Shi Yuqi; Kodai Naraoka	13; 21	21; 15	21; 17
3	(China) (Japan)	Chen Yufei; Akane Yamaguchi	14; 21	15; 21
4	(China) (Japan)	Liu Yuchen / Ou Xuanyi; Takuro Hoki / Yugo Kobayashi	17; 21	21; 19	22; 20
5	(China) (Japan)	Chen Qingchen / Jia Yifan; Yuki Fukushima / Sayaka Hirota	21; 11	21; 6

=== Malaysia vs South Korea ===
Malaysia
1
Suzhou Olympic Sports Centre Court 1
20 May 2023, 10:00 UTC+8

South Korea
3

			1	2	3
1	(Malaysia) (South Korea)	Chen Tang Jie / Toh Ee Wei; Seo Seung-jae / Chae Yoo-jung	21; 11	13; 21	7; 21
2	(Malaysia) (South Korea)	Lee Zii Jia; Jeon Hyeok-jin	21; 11	21; 9
3	(Malaysia) (South Korea)	Letshanaa Karupathevan; An Se-young	10; 21	13; 21
4	(Malaysia) (South Korea)	Aaron Chia / Soh Wooi Yik; Kim Won-ho / Na Sung-seung	12; 21	11; 21
5	(Malaysia) (South Korea)	Pearly Tan / Thinaah Muralitharan; Baek Ha-na / Lee So-hee				not played

== Final ==
=== China vs South Korea ===
China
3
Suzhou Olympic Sports Centre Court 1
21 May 2023, 14:00 UTC+8

South Korea
0

			1	2	3
1	(China) (South Korea)	Zheng Siwei / Huang Yaqiong; Seo Seung-jae / Chae Yoo-jung	18; 21	22; 20	21; 8
2	(China) (South Korea)	Shi Yuqi; Lee Yun-gyu	21; 13	21; 17
3	(China) (South Korea)	Chen Yufei; An Se-young	21; 16	22; 20
4	(China) (South Korea)	Liang Weikeng / Wang Chang; Kim Won-ho / Na Sung-seung				not played
5	(China) (South Korea)	Chen Qingchen / Jia Yifan; Baek Ha-na / Lee So-hee				not played
