= 2025 Indonesia Open =

2025 badminton tournament in Indonesia

Tournament details
- Dates: 3–8 June
- Edition: 43rd
- Level: Super 1000
- Total prize money: US$1,450,000
- Venue: Istora Gelora Bung Karno
- Location: Jakarta, Indonesia

Champions
- Men's singles: (Denmark) Anders Antonsen
- Women's singles: (South Korea) An Se-young
- Men's doubles: (South Korea) Kim Won-ho (South Korea) Seo Seung-jae
- Women's doubles: (China) Liu Shengshu (China) Tan Ning
- Mixed doubles: (France) Thom Gicquel (France) Delphine Delrue

The 2025 Indonesia Open (officially known as the Kapal Api Indonesia Open 2025 for sponsorship reasons) was a badminton tournament which took place at Istora Gelora Bung Karno in Jakarta from 3 to 8 June 2025 and had a total purse of $1,450,000.

== Tournament ==
The 2025 Indonesia Open tournament was the fourteenth tournament of the 2025 BWF World Tour and also part of Indonesia Open which had been held since 1982 and is organized by the Badminton Association of Indonesia and sanctioned by the BWF.

=== Venue ===
The tournament was held at the Istora Gelora Bung Karno inside the Gelora Bung Karno Sports Complex in Central Jakarta, Jakarta, Indonesia.

=== Point distribution ===
Below is the point distribution table for each phase of the tournament based on the BWF points system for the BWF World Tour Super 1000 event.

Winner	Runner-up	3/4	5/8	9/16	17/32
12,000	10,200	8,400	6,600	4,800	3,000

=== Prize money ===
The total prize money for this tournament is US$1,450,000. The distribution of the prize money was in accordance with BWF regulations.

Event	Winner	Finalist	Semi-finals	Quarter-finals	Last 16	Last 32
Singles	$101,500	$49,300	$20,300	$7,975	$4,350	$1,450
Doubles	$107,300	$50,750	$20,300	$9,062.50	$4,712.50	$1,450

== Men's singles ==
=== Seeds ===
1. (China) Shi Yuqi (semi-finals)
2. (Thailand) Kunlavut Vitidsarn (semi-finals)
3. (Denmark) Anders Antonsen (champion)
4. (China) Li Shifeng (quarter-finals)
5. (Indonesia) Jonatan Christie (second round)
6. (Chinese Taipei) Chou Tien-chen (final)
7. (Japan) Kodai Naraoka (first round)
8. (France) Alex Lanier (quarter-finals)

=== Finals ===
Semi-finals
1	(China) Shi Yuqi	21	18	19
3	(Denmark) Anders Antonsen	9	21	21
6	(Chinese Taipei) Chou Tien-chen	21	23
2	(Thailand) Kunlavut Vitidsarn	16	21

Final
3	(Denmark) Anders Antonsen	22	21
6	(Chinese Taipei) Chou Tien-chen	20	14

=== Top half ===
==== Section 1 ====
First round
1	(China) Shi YQ	21	20	21
(India) L Sen	11	22	15
(Hong Kong) Ng K L	15	22	20
(Japan) Y Tanaka	21	20	22
7	(Japan) K Naraoka	19	12
(Denmark) R Gemke	21	21
(China) Wang ZX	21	21
(Japan) K Nishimoto	15	10

Second round
1	(China) Shi YQ	21	21
(Japan) Y Tanaka	14	7
(Denmark) R Gemke	19	5
(China) Wang ZX	21	21

Quarter-finals
1	(China) Shi YQ	21	21
(China) Wang ZX	13	6

==== Section 2 ====
First round
3	(Denmark) A Antonsen	21	21
(Chinese Taipei) Chi Y-j	11	12
(India) Prannoy H. S.	17	18
(Indonesia) A Farhan	21	21
5	(Indonesia) J Christie	8	21	21
(Singapore) J Teh	21	11	12
(Hong Kong) Lee C Y	21	7	23
(Japan) K Watanabe	16	21	21

Second round
3	(Denmark) A Antonsen	21	18	21
(Indonesia) A Farhan	16	21	14
5	(Indonesia) J Christie	21	12	10
(Hong Kong) Lee C Y	12	21	21

Quarter-finals
3	(Denmark) A Antonsen	23	21
(Hong Kong) Lee C Y	21	9

=== Bottom half ===
==== Section 3 ====
First round
(France) T J Popov	19	13
(France) C Popov	21	21
(Chinese Taipei) Lin C-y	20	18
6	(Chinese Taipei) Chou T-c	22	21
PFR	(Indonesia) C A Dwi Wardoyo	13	12
(Malaysia) Leong J H	21	21
(Canada) B Yang	15	14
4	(China) Li SF	21	21

Second round
(France) C Popov	18	21	17
6	(Chinese Taipei) Chou T-c	21	9	21
(Malaysia) Leong J H	18	18
4	(China) Li SF	21	21

Quarter-finals
6	(Chinese Taipei) Chou T-c	14	21	21
4	(China) Li SF	21	13	17

==== Section 4 ====
First round
(Singapore) Loh K Y	22	21
(India) K George	20	9
(China) Weng HY	13^{r}
8	(France) A Lanier	21
(China) Lu GZ	20	26	13
(Chinese Taipei) Lee C-h	22	24	21
(Chinese Taipei) Wang T-w	14	12
2	(Thailand) K Vitidsarn	21	21

Second round
(Singapore) Loh K Y	21	14	8
8	(France) A Lanier	16	21	21
(Chinese Taipei) Lee C-h	10	17
2	(Thailand) K Vitidsarn	21	21

Quarter-finals
8	(France) A Lanier	12	16
2	(Thailand) K Vitidsarn	21	21

== Women's singles ==
=== Seeds ===
1. (South Korea) An Se-young (champion)
2. (China) Wang Zhiyi (final)
3. (Japan) Akane Yamaguchi (semi-finals)
4. (China) Han Yue (semi-finals)
5. (China) Chen Yufei (quarter-finals)
6. (Thailand) Pornpawee Chochuwong (quarter-finals)
7. (Japan) Tomoka Miyazaki (second round)
8. (Thailand) Supanida Katethong (second round)

=== Finals ===
Semi-finals
1	(South Korea) An Se-young	21	21
3	(Japan) Akane Yamaguchi	18	17
4	(China) Han Yue	12	13
2	(China) Wang Zhiyi	21	21

Final
1	(South Korea) An Se-young	13	21	21
2	(China) Wang Zhiyi	21	19	15

=== Top half ===
==== Section 1 ====
First round
1	(South Korea) An S-y	21	21
(Thailand) B Ongbamrungphan	14	11
(South Korea) Kim G-e	21	21
(India) A Upadhyaya	15	9
6	(Thailand) P Chochuwong	21	21
(Chinese Taipei) Chiu P-c	18	12
(India) P V Sindhu	22	21	21
(Japan) N Okuhara	20	23	15

Second round
1	(South Korea) An S-y	21	21
(South Korea) Kim G-e	7	11
6	(Thailand) P Chochuwong	20	21	21
(India) P V Sindhu	22	10	18

Quarter-finals
1	(South Korea) An S-y	21	21
6	(Thailand) P Chochuwong	11	10

==== Section 2 ====
First round
3	(Japan) A Yamaguchi	21	21
(Denmark) L H Kjærsfeldt	9	18
(Chinese Taipei) Sung S-y	21	21
(United States) BW Zhang	18	12
8	(Thailand) S Katethong	14	21	21
(India) R Ramraj	21	15	12
(Indonesia) P K Wardani	16	15
(India) M Bansod	21	16^{r}

Second round
3	(Japan) A Yamaguchi	21	21
(Chinese Taipei) Sung S-y	12	17
8	(Thailand) S Katethong	21	9	8
(Indonesia) P K Wardani	17	21	21

Quarter-finals
3	(Japan) A Yamaguchi	21	22
(Indonesia) P K Wardani	19	20

=== Bottom half ===
==== Section 3 ====
First round
(Vietnam) Nguyễn T L	21	20
(Japan) N Nidaira	23	22
(Thailand) P Choeikeewong	10	15
5	(China) Chen YF	21	21
(Chinese Taipei) Lin H-t	21	21
(Indonesia) K A C Dewi	19	10
(Singapore) Yeo J M	19	19
4	(China) Han Y	21	21

Second round
(Japan) N Nidaira	9	14
5	(China) Chen YF	21	21
(Chinese Taipei) Lin H-t	9	9
4	(China) Han Y	21	21

Quarter-finals
5	(China) Chen YF
4	(China) Han Y	w	/	o

==== Section 4 ====
First round
(China) Gao FJ	19	21	21
(Ukraine) P Buhrova	21	10	15
(Canada) M Li	21	14	23
7	(Japan) T Miyazaki	19	21	25
(Scotland) K Gilmour	22	21
(Malaysia) Goh J W	20	16
(Chinese Taipei) Hsu W-c	11	13
2	(China) Wang ZY	21	21

Second round
(China) Gao FJ	19	21	21
7	(Japan) T Miyazaki	21	19	10
(Scotland) K Gilmour	13	21	14
2	(China) Wang ZY	21	19	21

Quarter-finals
(China) Gao FJ	18	21
2	(China) Wang ZY	21	23

== Men's doubles ==
=== Seeds ===
1. (Malaysia) Goh Sze Fei / Nur Izzuddin (quarter-finals)
2. (Denmark) Kim Astrup / Anders Skaarup Rasmussen (second round)
3. (Malaysia) Aaron Chia / Soh Wooi Yik (first round)
4. (China) Liang Weikeng / Wang Chang (second round)
5. (South Korea) Kim Won-ho / Seo Seung-jae (champions)
6. (Indonesia) Fajar Alfian / Muhammad Rian Ardianto (semi-finals)
7. (Malaysia) Man Wei Chong / Tee Kai Wun (semi-finals)
8. (Indonesia) Sabar Karyaman Gutama / Muhammad Reza Pahlevi Isfahani (final)

=== Finals ===
Semi-finals
8	(Indonesia) Sabar Karyaman Gutama (Indonesia) Muhammad Reza Pahlevi Isfahani	21	12	21
7	(Malaysia) Man Wei Chong (Malaysia) Tee Kai Wun	18	21	18
6	(Indonesia) Fajar Alfian (Indonesia) Muhammad Rian Ardianto	18	21	21
5	(South Korea) Kim Won-ho (South Korea) Seo Seung-jae	21	19	23

Final
8	(Indonesia) Sabar Karyaman Gutama (Indonesia) Muhammad Reza Pahlevi Isfahani	21	19	12
5	(South Korea) Kim Won-ho (South Korea) Seo Seung-jae	18	21	21

=== Top half ===
==== Section 1 ====
First round
1	(Malaysia) Goh S F (Malaysia) N Izzuddin	17	21	21
(Chinese Taipei) Lee F-c (Chinese Taipei) Lee F-j	21	17	14
(Malaysia) N M Azriyn A (Malaysia) Tan W K	21	21
(China) Xie HN (China) Zeng WH	17	12
8	(Indonesia) S K Gutama (Indonesia) M R P Isfahani	21	21
(Chinese Taipei) Lee J-h (Chinese Taipei) Yang P-hs	13	18
(Thailand) K Kedren (Thailand) D Puavaranukroh	21	21	21
(France) C Popov (France) T J Popov	23	17	18

Second round
1	(Malaysia) Goh S F (Malaysia) N Izzuddin	21	16	21
(Malaysia) N M Azriyn A (Malaysia) Tan W K	14	21	14
8	(Indonesia) S K Gutama (Indonesia) M R P Isfahani	21	21
(Thailand) K Kedren (Thailand) D Puavaranukroh	13	9

Quarter-finals
1	(Malaysia) Goh S F (Malaysia) N Izzuddin	19	21	19
8	(Indonesia) S K Gutama (Indonesia) M R P Isfahani	21	9	21

==== Section 2 ====
First round
3	(Malaysia) A Chia (Malaysia) Soh W Y	13	21	18
(Denmark) R Kjær (Denmark) F Søgaard	21	19	21
(Indonesia) L R Carnando (Indonesia) B Maulana	21	18	14
(India) S Rankireddy (India) C Shetty	18	21	21
7	(Malaysia) Man W C (Malaysia) Tee K W	21	21
(United States) Chen Z-y (United States) P Smith	6	11
(France) E Adam (France) L Rossi
(Malaysia) J Arif (Malaysia) Yap R K	w	/	o

Second round
(Denmark) R Kjær (Denmark) F Søgaard	21	18	20
(India) S Rankireddy (India) C Shetty	16	21	22
7	(Malaysia) Man W C (Malaysia) Tee K W	14	21	21
(Malaysia) J Arif (Malaysia) Yap R K	21	11	15

Quarter-finals
(India) S Rankireddy (India) C Shetty	19	16
7	(Malaysia) Man W C (Malaysia) Tee K W	21	21

=== Bottom half ===
==== Section 3 ====
First round
(Japan) H Midorikawa (Japan) K Yamashita	17	20
(China) Chen BY (China) Liu Yi	21	22
(Denmark) D Lundgaard (Denmark) M Vestergaard	10	19
6	(Indonesia) F Alfian (Indonesia) M R Ardianto	21	21
(Chinese Taipei) Liu K-h (Chinese Taipei) Yang P-h	20	22
(China) Huang D (China) Liu Ya	22	24
(Malaysia) Ong Y S (Malaysia) Teo E Y	21	20
4	(China) Liang WK (China) Wang C	23	22

Second round
(China) Chen BY (China) Liu Yi	18	12
6	(Indonesia) F Alfian (Indonesia) M R Ardianto	21	21
(China) Huang D (China) Liu Ya	21	13	21
4	(China) Liang WK (China) Wang C	17	21	16

Quarter-finals
6	(Indonesia) F Alfian (Indonesia) M R Ardianto	21	23
(China) Huang D (China) Liu Ya	19	21

==== Section 4 ====
First round
(Japan) T Nomura (Japan) Y Shimogami	11	21	23
(Japan) K Mitsuhashi (Japan) H Okamura	21	17	21
(Chinese Taipei) Chen Z-r (Chinese Taipei) Lin Y-c	15	11
5	(South Korea) Kim W-h (South Korea) Seo S-j	21	21
(Malaysia) Choong H J (Malaysia) M Haikal	13	9
(Japan) T Hoki (Japan) Y Kobayashi	21	21
(Chinese Taipei) Chiu H-c (Chinese Taipei) Wang C-l	18	21	15
2	(Denmark) K Astrup (Denmark) A S Rasmussen	21	11	21

Second round
(Japan) T Nomura (Japan) Y Shimogami	21	11	19
5	(South Korea) Kim W-h (South Korea) Seo S-j	17	21	21
(Japan) T Hoki (Japan) Y Kobayashi	29	21
2	(Denmark) K Astrup (Denmark) A S Rasmussen	27	11

Quarter-finals
5	(South Korea) Kim W-h (South Korea) Seo S-j	21	21
(Japan) T Hoki (Japan) Y Kobayashi	19	9

== Women's doubles ==
=== Seeds ===
1. (China) Liu Shengshu / Tan Ning (champions)
2. (Japan) Nami Matsuyama / Chiharu Shida (withdrew)
3. (South Korea) Baek Ha-na / Lee So-hee (semi-finals)
4. (Malaysia) Pearly Tan / Thinaah Muralitharan (final)
5. (China) Li Yijing / Luo Xumin (semi-finals)
6. (Japan) Rin Iwanaga / Kie Nakanishi (quarter-finals)
7. (South Korea) Kim Hye-jeong / Kong Hee-yong (quarter-finals)
8. (Indonesia) Febriana Dwipuji Kusuma / Amallia Cahaya Pratiwi (quarter-finals)

=== Finals ===
Semi-finals
1	(China) Liu Shengshu (China) Tan Ning	21	21
3	(South Korea) Baek Ha-na (South Korea) Lee So-hee	19	18
5	(China) Li Yijing (China) Luo Xumin	21	17	11
4	(Malaysia) Pearly Tan (Malaysia) Thinaah Muralitharan	12	21	21

Final
1	(China) Liu Shengshu (China) Tan Ning	23	21	21
4	(Malaysia) Pearly Tan (Malaysia) Thinaah Muralitharan	25	12	19

=== Top half ===
==== Section 1 ====
First round
1	(China) Liu SS (China) Tan N	21	21
(Thailand) O Jongsathapornparn (Thailand) S Suwachai	12	17
(Indonesia) M T Puspitasari (Indonesia) R A Rose	14	21	15
(Chinese Taipei) Hsieh P-s (Chinese Taipei) Hung E-t	21	17	21
7	(South Korea) Kim H-j (South Korea) Kong H-y	21	15	21
(United States) L Lam (United States) A Lee	11	21	19
(Chinese Taipei) Hu L-f (Chinese Taipei) Jheng Y-c	16	21	5
(China) Jia YF (China) Zhang SX	21	9	21

Second round
1	(China) Liu SS (China) Tan N	21	22
(Chinese Taipei) Hsieh P-s (Chinese Taipei) Hung E-t	10	20
7	(South Korea) Kim H-j (South Korea) Kong H-y	24	21
(China) Jia YF (China) Zhang SX	22	18

Quarter-finals
1	(China) Liu SS (China) Tan N	21	21
7	(South Korea) Kim H-j (South Korea) Kong H-y	18	10

==== Section 2 ====
First round
3	(South Korea) Baek H-n (South Korea) Lee S-h	19	21	21
(Chinese Taipei) Hsu Y-h (Chinese Taipei) Lin J-h	21	18	10
(Indonesia) A Rahayu (Indonesia) F Setianingrum	21	24
(Chinese Taipei) Chang C-h (Chinese Taipei) Yang C-t	16	22
8	(Indonesia) F D Kusuma (Indonesia) A C Pratiwi	21	21
(Poland) P Hankiewicz (Poland) K Marczak	4	10
(Indonesia) S S Azzahra (Indonesia) A S Rahayu	21	21
(Scotland) J MacPherson (Scotland) C Torrance	16	14

Second round
3	(South Korea) Baek H-n (South Korea) Lee S-h	16	21	21
(Indonesia) A Rahayu (Indonesia) F Setianingrum	21	16	14
8	(Indonesia) F D Kusuma (Indonesia) A C Pratiwi	15	21	21
(Indonesia) S S Azzahra (Indonesia) A S Rahayu	21	12	9

Quarter-finals
3	(South Korea) Baek H-n (South Korea) Lee S-h	18	21	21
8	(Indonesia) F D Kusuma (Indonesia) A C Pratiwi	21	16	7

=== Bottom half ===
==== Section 3 ====
First round
PFR	(Australia) G Somerville (Australia) A Yu	14	23	12
(Japan) Y Fukushima (Japan) M Matsumoto	21	21	21
(Ukraine) P Buhrova (Ukraine) Y Kantemyr	14	20
SWM	(India) T Jolly (India) G G Pullela	21	22
(Hong Kong) Yeung N T (Hong Kong) Yeung P L	21	24
(Indonesia) A N T Munggaran (Indonesia) A Z D Ramadhani	11	22
(Chinese Taipei) Teng C-h (Chinese Taipei) Yang C-y	6	12
5	(China) Li YJ (China) Luo XM	21	21

Second round
(Japan) Y Fukushima (Japan) M Matsumoto	21	24
SWM	(India) T Jolly (India) G G Pullela	13	22
(Hong Kong) Yeung N T (Hong Kong) Yeung P L	7	16
5	(China) Li YJ (China) Luo XM	21	21

Quarter-finals
(Japan) Y Fukushima (Japan) M Matsumoto	9	19
5	(China) Li YJ (China) Luo XM	21	21

==== Section 4 ====
First round
(Indonesia) I S Meida (Indonesia) R K Nastine	21	14	17
(Malaysia) Ong X Y (Malaysia) C Ting	10	21	21
(Canada) J Dent (Canada) C Lai	15	9
6	(Japan) R Iwanaga (Japan) K Nakanishi	21	21
(Malaysia) Go P K (Malaysia) Teoh M X	21	16	19
(Indonesia) L T Mayasari (Indonesia) S F S Ramadhanti	19	21	21
(Chinese Taipei) Sung S-y (Chinese Taipei) Yu C-h	16	17
4	(Malaysia) P Tan (Malaysia) T Muralitharan	21	21

Second round
(Malaysia) Ong X Y (Malaysia) C Ting	15	16
6	(Japan) R Iwanaga (Japan) K Nakanishi	21	21
(Indonesia) L T Mayasari (Indonesia) S F S Ramadhanti	21	16	17
4	(Malaysia) P Tan (Malaysia) T Muralitharan	18	21	21

Quarter-finals
6	(Japan) R Iwanaga (Japan) K Nakanishi	6	18
4	(Malaysia) P Tan (Malaysia) T Muralitharan	21	21

== Mixed doubles ==
=== Seeds ===
1. (Hong Kong) Tang Chun Man / Tse Ying Suet (first round)
2. (Malaysia) Chen Tang Jie / Toh Ee Wei (semi-finals)
3. (Malaysia) Goh Soon Huat / Shevon Jemie Lai (quarter-finals)
4. (China) Guo Xinwa / Chen Fanghui (first round)
5. (Denmark) Jesper Toft / Amalie Magelund (quarter-finals)
6. (Thailand) Dechapol Puavaranukroh / Supissara Paewsampran (final)
7. (Japan) Hiroki Midorikawa / Natsu Saito (quarter-finals)
8. (Chinese Taipei) Yang Po-hsuan / Hu Ling-fang (first round)

=== Finals ===
Semi-finals
(France) Thom Gicquel (France) Delphine Delrue	17	21	21
(China) Cheng Xing (China) Zhang Chi	21	14	12
6	(Thailand) Dechapol Puavaranukroh (Thailand) Supissara Paewsampran	21	21	21
2	(Malaysia) Chen Tang Jie (Malaysia) Toh Ee Wei	23	15	11

Final
(France) Thom Gicquel (France) Delphine Delrue	21	21
6	(Thailand) Dechapol Puavaranukroh (Thailand) Supissara Paewsampran	16	18

=== Top half ===
==== Section 1 ====
First round
1	(Hong Kong) Tang C M (Hong Kong) Tse Y S	22	12
(Indonesia) A Maulana (Indonesia) I C S Jamil	24	21
(Indonesia) R Rivaldy (Indonesia) P H Mentari	21	17	19
(Singapore) T Hee (Singapore) Jin Y J	9	21	21
8	(Chinese Taipei) Yang P-hs (Chinese Taipei) Hu L-f	9	14
(Thailand) R Oupthong (Thailand) J Sudjaipraparat	21	21
(Indonesia) R N Kusharjanto (Indonesia) G E Widjaja	21	15	22
(France) T Gicquel (France) D Delrue	17	21	24

Second round
(Indonesia) A Maulana (Indonesia) I C S Jamil	21	21
(Singapore) T Hee (Singapore) Jin Y J	19	11
(Thailand) R Oupthong (Thailand) J Sudjaipraparat	19	18
(France) T Gicquel (France) D Delrue	21	21

Quarter-finals
(Indonesia) A Maulana (Indonesia) I C S Jamil	11	21
(France) T Gicquel (France) D Delrue	21	23

==== Section 2 ====
First round
4	(China) Guo XW (China) Chen FH	21	9	18
(China) Cheng X (China) Zhang C	17	21	21
(United States) P Smith (United States) J Gai	14	20
(China) Feng YZ (China) Wei YX	21	22
7	(Japan) H Midorikawa (Japan) N Saito	21	25
(Chinese Taipei) Chen C-k (Chinese Taipei) Hsu Y-h	16	23
(Malaysia) Wong T C (Malaysia) Lim C S	11	16
(Indonesia) J Hidayatullah (Indonesia) F Pasaribu	21	21

Second round
(China) Cheng X (China) Zhang C	21	21
(China) Feng YZ (China) Wei YX	18	15
7	(Japan) H Midorikawa (Japan) N Saito	23	14	22
(Indonesia) J Hidayatullah (Indonesia) F Pasaribu	21	21	20

Quarter-finals
(China) Cheng X (China) Zhang C	21	21
7	(Japan) H Midorikawa (Japan) N Saito	19	13

=== Bottom half ===
==== Section 3 ====
First round
(Chinese Taipei) Ye H-w (Chinese Taipei) N G Chan	21	16	17
(India) S Karunakaran (India) A Variyath	15	21	21
(Indonesia) D Ferdinansyah (Indonesia) S F S Ramadhanti	18	13
6	(Thailand) D Puavaranukroh (Thailand) S Paewsampran	21	21
(Chinese Taipei) Lu M-c (Chinese Taipei) Hung E-t	21	23	16
(Indonesia) A Syahnawi (Indonesia) N V Marwah	14	25	21
(Thailand) P Horbanluekit (Thailand) S Taerattanachai	12	16
3	(Malaysia) Goh S H (Malaysia) S J Lai	21	21

Second round
(India) S Karunakaran (India) A Variyath	7	12
6	(Thailand) D Puavaranukroh (Thailand) S Paewsampran	21	21
(Indonesia) A Syahnawi (Indonesia) N V Marwah	12	17
3	(Malaysia) Goh S H (Malaysia) S J Lai	21	21

Quarter-finals
6	(Thailand) D Puavaranukroh (Thailand) S Paewsampran	21	21
3	(Malaysia) Goh S H (Malaysia) S J Lai	16	12

==== Section 4 ====
First round
(India) R Kapoor (India) R Gadde	14	9
(Japan) Y Shimogami (Japan) S Hobara	21	21
(Scotland) A Dunn (Scotland) J MacPherson	15	17
5	(Denmark) J Toft (Denmark) A Magelund	21	21
(Denmark) M Vestergaard (Denmark) C Busch	21	21
(India) A Surya (India) A Pramuthesh	15	9
(India) D Kapila (India) T Crasto	11	21	14
2	(Malaysia) Chen T J (Malaysia) Toh E W	21	16	21

Second round
(Japan) Y Shimogami (Japan) S Hobara	20	23
5	(Denmark) J Toft (Denmark) A Magelund	22	25
(Denmark) M Vestergaard (Denmark) C Busch	9	12
2	(Malaysia) Chen T J (Malaysia) Toh E W	21	21

Quarter-finals
5	(Denmark) J Toft (Denmark) A Magelund	21	16	14
2	(Malaysia) Chen T J (Malaysia) Toh E W	17	21	21

Preceded by 2025 Singapore Open	BWF World Tour; 2025 BWF season	Succeeded by 2025 U.S. Open
