= 2026 BWF World Championships – Men's singles =

Badminton championships

Men's singles at the 2026 BWF World Championships
- Venue: Indira Gandhi Arena
- Location: New Delhi, India
- Dates: 17–23 August
- Competitors: 64 from 38 nations

Medalists
gold medal	Alex Lanier	France
silver medal	Kodai Naraoka	Japan
bronze medal	Chou Tien-chen	Chinese Taipei
bronze medal	Victor Lai	Canada

The Men's singles tournament of the 2026 BWF World Championships took place from 17 to 23 August 2026 at the Indira Gandhi Arena in New Delhi.

== Seeds ==
The seeding list was based on the World Rankings of 31 July 2026.

1. (China) Shi Yuqi (first round)
2. (Thailand) Kunlavut Vitidsarn (quarter-finals)
3. (Indonesia) Jonatan Christie (third round)
4. (Denmark) Anders Antonsen (quarter-finals)
5. (France) Christo Popov (first round)
6. (Chinese Taipei) Chou Tien-chen (semi-finals)
7. (Canada) Victor Lai (semi-finals)
8. (China) Li Shifeng (third round)
9. (France) Alex Lanier (champion)
10. (Japan) Kodai Naraoka (final)
11. (Indonesia) Alwi Farhan (quarter-finals)
12. (Chinese Taipei) Lin Chun-yi (second round)
13. (Singapore) Loh Kean Yew (third round)
14. (India) Lakshya Sen (second round)
15. (France) Toma Junior Popov (third round)
16. (China) Weng Hongyang (first round)

== Draw ==
The drawing ceremony was held on 5 August.

=== Finals ===
Semi-finals
6	(Chinese Taipei) Chou Tien-chen	21	11	10
10	(Japan) Kodai Naraoka	17	21	21
7	(Canada) Victor Lai	21	13	14
9	(France) Alex Lanier	16	21	21

Final
10	(Japan) Kodai Naraoka	11	11
9	(France) Alex Lanier	21	21

=== Top half ===
==== Section 1 ====
First round
1	(China) Shi YQ	14	21	19
(India) A Shetty	21	13	21
(Sri Lanka) D Abeywickrama	17	21	21
(Peru) A Viale	21	15	9
11	(Indonesia) A Farhan	21	21
(South Korea) Yoo T-b	17	12
(Finland) J Oldorff	19	21	23
(Vietnam) Lê Đ P	21	9	21
6	(Chinese Taipei) Chou T-c	21	21
(Philippines) C Villaflor	12	12
(Brazil) D Oliveira	21	14	12
(Italy) G Toti	19	21	21
16	(China) Weng HY	17	14
(Japan) Y Tanaka	21	21
(Azerbaijan) A R Dwicahyo	14	21	21
(Sweden) G Björkler	21	17	18

Second round
(India) A Shetty	21	21
(Sri Lanka) D Abeywickrama	8	10
11	(Indonesia) A Farhan	21	21
(Finland) J Oldorff	12	9
6	(Chinese Taipei) Chou T-c	21	21
(Italy) G Toti	12	11
(Japan) Y Tanaka	21	21
(Azerbaijan) A R Dwicahyo	18	14

Third round
(India) A Shetty	19	11
11	(Indonesia) A Farhan	21	21
6	(Chinese Taipei) Chou T-c	21	21
(Japan) Y Tanaka	14	9

Quarter-finals
11	(Indonesia) A Farhan	15	15
6	(Chinese Taipei) Chou T-c	21	21

==== Section 2 ====
First round
4	(Denmark) A Antonsen	21	21
(Azerbaijan) D D Pangestu	19	17
(Croatia) A Dinata	21	17	14
(Republic of Ireland) N Nguyen	19	21	21
15	(France) T J Popov	21	21
(Poland) D Kwinta	19	13
(Poland) M Szymanowski	10	17
(Myanmar) H Htut	21	21
8	(China) Li SF	21	21
(Kazakhstan) D Panarin	7	10
(Brazil) J Matias	19	15
(Malaysia) Leong J H	21	21
10	(Japan) K Naraoka	21	7	21
(Chinese Taipei) Chi Y-j	16	21	12
(El Salvador) U Canjura	10	8
(England) H Huang	21	21

Second round
4	(Denmark) A Antonsen	21	21	23
(Republic of Ireland) N Nguyen	23	19	21
15	(France) T J Popov	21	21
(Myanmar) H Htut	13	11
8	(China) Li SF	21	21
(Malaysia) Leong J H	19	19
10	(Japan) K Naraoka	21	21
(England) H Huang	16	14

Third round
4	(Denmark) A Antonsen	21	17	21
15	(France) T J Popov	17	21	14
8	(China) Li SF	21	21	11
10	(Japan) K Naraoka	13	23	21

Quarter-finals
4	(Denmark) A Antonsen	19	15
10	(Japan) K Naraoka	21	21

=== Bottom half ===
==== Section 3 ====
First round
(Hong Kong) Lee C Y	21	21
(Vietnam) Nguyễn H Đ	17	14
(Canada) B Yang	14	20
13	(Singapore) Loh K Y	21	22
(Guatemala) K Cordón	17	13
(United States) M S Alcala	21	21
(South Korea) Jeon H-j	12	17
7	(Canada) V Lai	21	21
(Denmark) R Gemke	21	21
(Belgium) J Carraggi	11	10
(Malaysia) J Hoh	18	8
12	(Chinese Taipei) Lin C-y	21	21
(Singapore) J Teh	21	21
(Italy) F Caponio	13	18
(Germany) M Kicklitz	15	14
3	(Indonesia) J Christie	21	21

Second round
(Hong Kong) Lee C Y	21	17	15
13	(Singapore) Loh K Y	15	21	21
(United States) M S Alcala	7	14
7	(Canada) V Lai	21	21
(Denmark) R Gemke	13	21	21
12	(Chinese Taipei) Lin C-y	21	17	11
(Singapore) J Teh	21	19	11
3	(Indonesia) J Christie	19	21	21

Third round
13	(Singapore) Loh K Y	20	18
7	(Canada) V Lai	22	21
(Denmark) R Gemke	11	21	21
3	(Indonesia) J Christie	21	13	18

Quarter-finals
7	(Canada) V Lai	21	21
(Denmark) R Gemke	19	18

==== Section 4 ====
First round
(Thailand) P Teeraratsakul	21	21
(Finland) K Koljonen	18	9
(Israel) M Zilberman	13	11
9	(France) A Lanier	21	21
(New Zealand) E Lau	13	15
(Hong Kong) Ng K L	21	21
(Japan) K Nishimoto	21	21
5	(France) C Popov	17	19
(Switzerland) T Künzi	4	15
(United States) G Tan	21	21
(Austria) C V Filimon	21	8	4
14	(India) L Sen	16	21	21
(Egypt) A H Elgamal	10	8
(Israel) D Dubovenko	21	21
(Sri Lanka) V Nettasinghe	11	6
2	(Thailand) K Vitidsarn	21	21

Second round
(Thailand) P Teeraratsakul	12	13
9	(France) A Lanier	21	21
(Hong Kong) Ng K L	17	21	21
(Japan) K Nishimoto	21	16	18
(United States) G Tan	19	21	21
14	(India) L Sen	21	19	17
(Israel) D Dubovenko	17	19
2	(Thailand) K Vitidsarn	21	21

Third round
9	(France) A Lanier	21	21
(Hong Kong) Ng K L	17	12
(United States) G Tan	10	10
2	(Thailand) K Vitidsarn	21	21

Quarter-finals
9	(France) A Lanier	19	21	21
2	(Thailand) K Vitidsarn	21	16	16
