= 2023 Sudirman Cup =

World mixed team badminton championships

Tournament details
- Dates: 14 – 21 May 2023
- Edition: 18th
- Level: International
- Nations: 16
- Venue: Suzhou Olympic Sports Centre
- Location: Suzhou, China

The 2023 Sudirman Cup (officially known as the TotalEnergies BWF Sudirman Cup Finals 2023 for sponsorship reasons) was the 18th edition of the Sudirman Cup, the biennial international badminton championship contested by the mixed national teams of the member associations of Badminton World Federation (BWF), since its inception in 1989. The tournament was played in Suzhou, China, between 14 and 21 May 2023. China were the defending champions. They successfully defended their title, lifting the trophy for a record-extending 13th time.

== Host city selection ==
New Delhi was awarded the hosting of the championship back in November 2018. In July 2021, it was announced that Suzhou, the original host for the 2021 edition, will host this edition instead and India accepted the offer to host 2026 BWF World Championships in exchange.

== Competition format ==
=== Qualification ===
Sixteen teams will participate in the final tournament in Suzhou, with the host and the defending champion will qualify automatically. Continental qualifying tournaments were held to determine the winner of allocated continental slots (4 from Asia and Europe, and 1 each from Africa, Oceania and Pan Am). The remaining slots were determined via team rankings. As China is both the host team and the defending champion, an extra slot from world ranking is opened.

Means of qualification	Date	Venue	Slot	Qualified teams
Host country	July 2021	—N/a	1	China
2021 Sudirman Cup	26 September – 3 October 2021	Vantaa	1	China
2023 All Africa Team Championships	13–16 February 2023	Benoni	1	Egypt
2023 European Mixed Team Badminton Championships	14–18 February 2023	Aire-sur-la-Lys	4	Denmark
2023 European Mixed Team Badminton Championships	14–18 February 2023	Aire-sur-la-Lys	4	France
2023 European Mixed Team Badminton Championships	14–18 February 2023	Aire-sur-la-Lys	4	England
2023 European Mixed Team Badminton Championships	14–18 February 2023	Aire-sur-la-Lys	4	Germany
2023 Asia Mixed Team Championships	14–19 February 2023	Dubai	3	South Korea
2023 Asia Mixed Team Championships	14–19 February 2023	Dubai	3	India
2023 Asia Mixed Team Championships	14–19 February 2023	Dubai	3	Thailand
2023 Oceania Mixed Team Badminton Championships	17–19 February 2023	Auckland	1	Australia
2023 Pan American Cup	16–19 February 2023	Guadalajara	1	Canada
World Team Rankings for Asia	21 February 2023	—N/a	1	Japan
World Team Rankings	21 February 2023	—N/a	4	Indonesia
World Team Rankings	21 February 2023	—N/a	4	Malaysia
World Team Rankings	21 February 2023	—N/a	4	Chinese Taipei
World Team Rankings	21 February 2023	—N/a	4	Singapore
Total			16	

=== Seeding ===
Teams	Seeds	Notes
China	1	Assigned to position A1
Japan	2	Assigned to position D1
Indonesia	3/4	
Malaysia	3/4	
Thailand	5/8	
South Korea	5/8	
Denmark	5/8	
Chinese Taipei	5/8	
India	9/12	
Singapore	9/12	
Germany	9/12	
France	9/12	
Canada	13/16	
England	13/16	
Egypt	13/16	
Australia	13/16	

== Draw ==
The draw for the tournament was conducted on 25 March 2023, at 15:00 CST, at Crowne Plaza Hotel in Suzhou, China. The 16 teams were drawn into four groups of four.

The teams were allocated to four pots based on the World Team Rankings of 21 February 2023. Pot 1 contained the top seed China (which were assigned to position A1), the second seed Japan (which were assigned to position D1) and the next two best teams, Indonesia and Malaysia. Pot 2 contained the next best four teams, Pot 3 contained the ninth to twelfth seeds, Pot 4 contained the thirteenth to sixteenth seeds.

Pot 1	Pot 2	Pot 3	Pot 4
China; Japan; Indonesia; Malaysia	Thailand; South Korea; Denmark; Chinese Taipei	India; Singapore; Germany; France	Canada; England; Egypt; Australia

== Tiebreakers ==
The rankings of teams in each group were determined as follows (regulations Chapter 5 Section 5.1. Article 16.3):

1. Points
2. Results between tied teams
3. Match difference
4. Game difference
5. Point difference

Teams that won 3 match first win the tie: 1 points for the winner, 0 points for the loser.

== Group stage ==
=== Group A ===
Pos	Team	Pld	W	L	GF	GA	GD	PF	PA	PD	Pts	Qualification
1	China (H)	3	3	0	30	3	+27	686	397	+289	3	Advance to quarter-finals
2	Denmark	3	2	1	20	13	+7	609	501	+108	2	Advance to quarter-finals
3	Singapore	3	1	2	14	18	−4	548	536	+12	1	
4	Egypt	3	0	3	0	30	−30	221	630	−409	0	

Source: TournamentSoftware.com
Rules for classification: Tiebreakers
(H) Host

14 May 2023
17:00

Denmark	4–1	Singapore
Report

Suzhou Olympic Sports Centre 2, Suzhou

14 May 2023
17:00

China	5–0	Egypt
Report

Suzhou Olympic Sports Centre 3, Suzhou

16 May 2023
17:00

China	5–0	Singapore
Report

Suzhou Olympic Sports Centre 1, Suzhou

16 May 2023
17:00

Denmark	5–0	Egypt
Report

Suzhou Olympic Sports Centre 2, Suzhou

18 May 2023
17:00

China	5–0	Denmark
Report

Suzhou Olympic Sports Centre 1, Suzhou

18 May 2023
17:00

Singapore	5–0	Egypt
Report

Suzhou Olympic Sports Centre 2, Suzhou

=== Group B ===
Pos	Team	Pld	W	L	GF	GA	GD	PF	PA	PD	Pts	Qualification
1	Thailand	3	3	0	24	11	+13	672	565	+107	3	Advance to quarter-finals
2	Indonesia	3	2	1	25	9	+16	675	564	+111	2	Advance to quarter-finals
3	Canada	3	1	2	9	23	−14	534	642	−108	1	
4	Germany	3	0	3	9	24	−15	546	656	−110	0	

Source: TournamentSoftware.com
Rules for classification: Tiebreakers

15 May 2023
10:00

Indonesia	5–0	Canada
Report

Suzhou Olympic Sports Centre 1, Suzhou

15 May 2023
10:00

Thailand	4–1	Germany
Report

Suzhou Olympic Sports Centre 2, Suzhou

16 May 2023
10:00

Indonesia	4–1	Germany
Report

Suzhou Olympic Sports Centre 1, Suzhou

16 May 2023
10:00

Thailand	4–1	Canada
Report

Suzhou Olympic Sports Centre 2, Suzhou

18 May 2023
10:00

Indonesia	2–3	Thailand
Report

Suzhou Olympic Sports Centre 1, Suzhou

18 May 2023
10:00

Germany	2–3	Canada
Report

Suzhou Olympic Sports Centre 2, Suzhou

=== Group C ===
Pos	Team	Pld	W	L	GF	GA	GD	PF	PA	PD	Pts	Qualification
1	Malaysia	3	3	0	28	5	+23	661	514	+147	3	Advance to quarter-finals
2	Chinese Taipei	3	2	1	23	13	+10	702	597	+105	2	Advance to quarter-finals
3	India	3	1	2	15	21	−6	643	667	−24	1	
4	Australia	3	0	3	2	29	−27	413	641	−228	0	

Source: TournamentSoftware.com
Rules for classification: Tiebreakers

14 May 2023
10:00

Chinese Taipei	4–1	India
Report

Suzhou Olympic Sports Centre 1, Suzhou

14 May 2023
10:00

Malaysia	5–0	Australia
Report

Suzhou Olympic Sports Centre 3, Suzhou

15 May 2023
10:00

Chinese Taipei	5–0	Australia
Report

Suzhou Olympic Sports Centre 3, Suzhou

15 May 2023
17:00

Malaysia	5–0	India
Report

Suzhou Olympic Sports Centre 1, Suzhou

17 May 2023
10:00

Malaysia	4–1	Chinese Taipei
Report

Suzhou Olympic Sports Centre 1, Suzhou

17 May 2023
10:00

India	4–1	Australia
Report

Suzhou Olympic Sports Centre 2, Suzhou

=== Group D ===
Pos	Team	Pld	W	L	GF	GA	GD	PF	PA	PD	Pts	Qualification
1	South Korea	3	3	0	27	6	+21	656	483	+173	3	Advance to quarter-finals
2	Japan	3	2	1	19	13	+6	593	522	+71	2	Advance to quarter-finals
3	France	3	1	2	15	18	−3	570	625	−55	1	
4	England	3	0	3	5	29	−24	486	675	−189	0	

Source: TournamentSoftware.com
Rules for classification: Tiebreakers

14 May 2023
10:00

South Korea	4–1	France
Report

Suzhou Olympic Sports Centre 2, Suzhou

14 May 2023
17:00

Japan	5–0	England
Report

Suzhou Olympic Sports Centre 1, Suzhou

15 May 2023
17:00

Japan	4–1	France
Report

Suzhou Olympic Sports Centre 2, Suzhou

15 May 2023
17:00

South Korea	4–1	England
Report

Suzhou Olympic Sports Centre 3, Suzhou

17 May 2023
17:00

Japan	0–5	South Korea
Report

Suzhou Olympic Sports Centre 1, Suzhou

17 May 2023
17:00

France	5–0	England
Report

Suzhou Olympic Sports Centre 2, Suzhou

== Knockout stage ==
=== Bracket ===
The draw was held on 18 May 2023, after the last group tie. The group runners-up were drawn against the group winners. Teams from the same group could not be drawn against each other.

Quarter-finals
China	3
Indonesia	0
Thailand	2
Japan	3
Denmark	1
Malaysia	3
Chinese Taipei	1
South Korea	3

Semi-finals
China	3
Japan	2
Malaysia	1
South Korea	3

Final
China	3
South Korea	0

=== Quarter-finals ===
19 May 2023
17:00

China	3–0	Indonesia
Report

Suzhou Olympic Sports Centre Court 1, Suzhou

19 May 2023
10:00

Thailand	2–3	Japan
Report

Suzhou Olympic Sports Centre Court 2, Suzhou

19 May 2023
17:00

Denmark	1–3	Malaysia
Report

Suzhou Olympic Sports Centre Court 2, Suzhou

19 May 2023
10:00

Chinese Taipei	1–3	South Korea
Report

Suzhou Olympic Sports Centre Court 1, Suzhou

=== Semi-finals ===
20 May 2023
17:00

China	3–2	Japan
Report

Suzhou Olympic Sports Centre Court 1, Suzhou

20 May 2023
10:00

Malaysia	1–3	South Korea
Report

Suzhou Olympic Sports Centre Court 1, Suzhou

=== Final ===
21 May 2023
14:00

China	3–0	South Korea
Report

Suzhou Olympic Sports Centre Court 1, Suzhou

2023 Sudirman Cup champions

China
13th title

== Final ranking ==
Pos	Team	Pld	W	L	Pts	MD	GD	PD	Final result
1st place, gold medalist(s)	China	6	6	0	6	+22	+38	+357	Champions
2nd place, silver medalist(s)	South Korea	6	5	1	5	+12	+23	+187	Runners-up
3rd place, bronze medalist(s)	Malaysia	5	4	1	4	+13	+22	+140	Eliminated in semi-finals
3rd place, bronze medalist(s)	Japan	5	3	2	3	+3	+5	+54	Eliminated in semi-finals
5	Thailand	4	3	1	3	+6	+13	+102	Eliminated in quarter-finals
6	Indonesia	4	2	2	2	+4	+11	+96	Eliminated in quarter-finals
7	Chinese Taipei	4	2	2	2	+3	+6	+88	Eliminated in quarter-finals
8	Denmark	4	2	2	2	+1	+2	+87	Eliminated in quarter-finals
9	France	3	1	2	1	−1	−3	−55	Eliminated in group stage
10	Singapore	3	1	2	1	−3	−4	+12	Eliminated in group stage
11	India	3	1	2	1	−5	−6	−24	Eliminated in group stage
12	Canada	3	1	2	1	−7	−14	−108	Eliminated in group stage
13	Germany	3	0	3	0	−7	−15	−110	Eliminated in group stage
14	England	3	0	3	0	−13	−24	−189	Eliminated in group stage
15	Australia	3	0	3	0	−13	−27	−228	Eliminated in group stage
16	Egypt	3	0	3	0	−15	−30	−409	Eliminated in group stage
