= 2022 European Junior Badminton Championships – Boys' singles =

Tournament details
- Dates: 22 – 27 August
- Competitors: 75 from 36 nations
- Venue: Athletic Hall Belgrade
- Location: Belgrade, Serbia

The boys' singles tournament of the 2022 European Junior Badminton Championships was held from 22 to 27 August. Christo Popov from France clinched this title in the last edition.

== Seeds ==
Seeds were announced on 5 August.

1. (France) Alex Lanier (champion, gold medalist)
2. (Estonia) Tauri Kilk (quarter-finals)
3. (France) Paul Tournefier (quarter-finals)
4. (France) Simon Baron-Vézilier (fourth round)
5. (Germany) Sanjeevi Vasudevan (quarter-finals)
6. (Italy) Luca Zhou (second round)
7. (Germany) Karim Krehemeier (third round)
8. (Belgium) Charles Fouyn (quarter-finals)

9. (Denmark) Christian Faust Kjær (semi-finals, bronze medalist)
10. (Italy) Alessandro Gozzini (fourth round)
11. (Switzerland) Nicolas Franconville (third round)
12. (Netherlands) Noah Haase (fourth round)
13. (Germany) Kenneth Neumann (third round)
14. (Hungary) Kristof Toth (third round)
15. (Spain) Ruben García (third round)
16. (Switzerland) Lorrain Joliat (fourth round)

== Draw ==
=== Finals ===
Quarter-finals
1 | (France) Alex Lanier | 21 | 21
8 | (Belgium) Charles Fouyn | 13 | 16
9 | (Denmark) Christian Faust Kjær | 21 | 21
5 | (Germany) Sanjeevi Vasudevan | 8 | 16
(Poland) Dominik Kwinta | 25 | 21
3 | (France) Paul Tournefier | 23 | 12
(Denmark) Jakob Houe | 21 | 21
2 | (Estonia) Tauri Kilk | 15 | 18

Semi-finals
1 | (France) Alex Lanier | 21 | 21
9 | (Denmark) Christian Faust Kjær | 10 | 10
(Poland) Dominik Kwinta | 24 | 10
(Denmark) Jakob Houe | 26 | 21

Final
1 | (France) Alex Lanier | 21 | 21
(Denmark) Jakob Houe | 18 | 12

=== Top half ===
==== Section 1 ====
First round
SUB | (Sweden) E Hylander | 21 | 22
(Norway) T Barth | 18 | 20

Second round
1 | (France) A Lanier | 21 | 21
(Serbia) V Petrović | 15 | 9
(Poland) M Gołaś | 13 | 21 | 17
(Turkey) M Kantar | 21 | 15 | 21
11 | (Switzerland) N Franconville | 21 | 21
(Croatia) I Zekan | 12 | 17
SUB | (Slovenia) K L Lenarčič | 11 | 9
SUB | (Sweden) E Hylander | 21 | 21

Third round
1 | (France) A Lanier | 21 | 21
(Turkey) M Kantar | 15 | 9
11 | (Switzerland) N Franconville | 15 | 19
SUB | (Sweden) E Hylander | 21 | 21

Fourth round
1 | (France) A Lanier | 21 | 21
SUB | (Sweden) E Hylander | 13 | 10

==== Section 2 ====
First round
(Slovakia) S Suchý | 12^{r}
(Republic of Ireland) V Pontanosa | 21

Second round
8 | (Belgium) C Fouyn | 19 | 21 | 21
(Spain) D Franco | 21 | 10 | 11
(Finland) N Nyqvist | 22 | 21
(Sweden) R Makboul | 20 | 18
10 | (Italy) A Gozzini | 21 | 18 | 21
(Hungary) Á Könczöl | 17 | 21 | 18
(Estonia) H Themas | 7 | 14
(Republic of Ireland) V Pontanosa | 21 | 21

Third round
8 | (Belgium) C Fouyn | 21 | 21
(Finland) N Nyqvist | 11 | 13
10 | (Italy) A Gozzini | 18 | 21 | 21
(Republic of Ireland) V Pontanosa | 21 | 7 | 13

Fourth round
8 | (Belgium) C Fouyn | 24 | 21
10 | (Italy) A Gozzini | 22 | 13

==== Section 3 ====
First round
(Czech Republic) D Kopřiva | 19 | 22 | 16
(Ukraine) O Titov | 21 | 20 | 21

Second round
4 | (France) S Baron-Vézilier | 21 | 21
(Greece) T Papadopoulos | 6 | 4
(Estonia) M Kirisma | 21 | 22
(Wales) H Leigh | 4 | 20
9 | (Denmark) C F Kjær | 21 | 21
(Scotland) A Meldrum | 9 | 8
(Serbia) U Mihajlović | 12 | 18
(Ukraine) O Titov | 21 | 21

Third round
4 | (France) S Baron-Vézilier | 21 | 21
(Estonia) M Kirisma | 7 | 8
9 | (Denmark) C F Kjær | 24 | 21
(Ukraine) O Titov | 22 | 14

Fourth round
4 | (France) S Baron-Vézilier | 17 | 18
9 | (Denmark) C F Kjær | 21 | 21

==== Section 4 ====
First round
(Lithuania) V Bagdanavičius | 21 | 21
(Portugal) S Batalha | 17 | 14
(Romania) D Pandele | 15 | 21 | 21
(Israel) A Shapira | 21 | 12 | 17

Second round
5 | (Germany) S Vasudevan | 17 | 21 | 21
(Austria) E Dantler | 21 | 14 | 16
(England) N Dalvi | 21 | 21
(Lithuania) V Bagdanavičius | 9 | 11
12 | (Netherlands) N Haase | 21 | 21
(Bulgaria) S Terziev | 16 | 17
(Latvia) T Sala | 10 | 6
(Romania) D Pandele | 21 | 21

Third round
5 | (Germany) S Vasudevan | 22 | 21
(England) N Dalvi | 20 | 11
12 | (Netherlands) N Haase | 21 | 21
(Romania) D Pandele | 8 | 12

Fourth round
5 | (Germany) S Vasudevan | 12 | 23 | 21
12 | (Netherlands) N Haase | 21 | 21 | 6

=== Bottom half ===
==== Section 5 ====
First round
(Poland) D Kwinta | 21 | 21
SUB | (Lithuania) D Pakšys | 3 | 2
(Spain) B Porto | 8 | 9
(Ukraine) M Vyshnevyi | 21 | 21

Second round
(Poland) D Kwinta | 21 | 21
(Netherlands) R van Dalm | 11 | 16
(Slovakia) R Pavlík | 17 | 15
15 | (Spain) R García | 21 | 21
(Ukraine) M Vyshnevyi | 21 | 21
(Latvia) E Meirans | 12 | 17
(Romania) L-S Pandele | 12 | 19
7 | (Germany) K Krehemeier | 21 | 21

Third round
(Poland) D Kwinta | 21 | 21
15 | (Spain) R García | 8 | 7
(Ukraine) M Vyshnevyi | 24 | 22
7 | (Germany) K Krehemeier | 22 | 18

Fourth round
(Poland) D Kwinta | 21 | 21 | 21
(Ukraine) M Vyshnevyi | 23 | 8 | 11

==== Section 6 ====
First round
(Bulgaria) Y Hristov | 13 | 14
(Cyprus) N Kokosis | 21 | 21

Second round
(Cyprus) N Kokosis | 15 | 21
(England) J B Lee | 21 | 23
(Sweden) E Ramstedt | 21 | 20 | 19
16 | (Switzerland) L Joliat | 15 | 22 | 21
(Norway) A Holmedal | 21 | 21
(Scotland) F Jack | 15 | 18
(Israel) I Schneidman | 19 | 21 | 7
3 | (France) P Tournefier | 21 | 19 | 21

Third round
(England) J B Lee | 18 | 10
16 | (Switzerland) L Joliat | 21 | 21
(Norway) A Holmedal | 21 | 8 | 11
(France) P Tournefier | 19 | 21 | 21

Fourth round
16 | (Switzerland) L Joliat | 14 | 20
3 | (France) P Tournefier | 21 | 22

==== Section 7 ====
First round
(Iceland) G I Helgason | 14 | 21 | 15
(Slovenia) Ž Podgoršek | 21 | 17 | 21
(Croatia) R Pipunić | 21 | 21
(Greece) M Sotiropoulos | 13 | 18

Second round
(Slovenia) Ž Podgoršek | 11 | 21 | 11
(Denmark) W Bøgebjerg | 21 | 16 | 21
(Turkey) F Saraç | 13 | 11
14 | (Hungary) K Toth | 21 | 21
(Croatia) R Pipunić | 23 | 16 | 15
(Luxembourg) J Pauquet | 21 | 21 | 21
(Denmark) J Houe | 21 | 21
6 | (Italy) L Zhou | 9 | 12

Third round
(Denmark) W Bøgebjerg | 19 | 21 | 22
14 | (Hungary) K Toth | 21 | 12 | 20
(Luxembourg) J Pauquet | 12 | 8
(Denmark) J Houe | 21 | 21

Fourth round
(Denmark) W Bøgebjerg | 12 | 21 | 13
(Denmark) J Houe | 21 | 6 | 21

==== Section 8 ====
First round
(Republic of Ireland) M Cheung | 21 | 21
(Belgium) B Rolin | 15 | 19

Second round
(Republic of Ireland) M Cheung | 15 | 21 | 21
(Austria) C Tomic
(Czech Republic) D Dvořák | 10 | 13
13 | (Germany) K Neumann | 21 | 21
(Serbia) A Jovičić | 13 | 21 | 15
(Finland) A Mäki | 21 | 14 | 21
(Portugal) T Berenguer | 6 | 8
2 | (Estonia) T Kilk | 21 | 21

Third round
(Republic of Ireland) M Cheung | 21 | 21
13 | (Germany) K Neumann | 19 | 19
(Finland) A Mäki | 15 | 19
2 | (Estonia) T Kilk | 21 | 21

Fourth round
(Republic of Ireland) M Cheung | 14 | 11
2 | (Estonia) T Kilk | 21 | 21
