= 2026 BWF World Championships =

2026 badminton tournament in India

Tournament details
- Dates: 17 – 23 August 2026
- Edition: 30th
- Level: International
- Venue: Indira Gandhi Arena
- Location: New Delhi, India
- Official website: Tournament link at bwfbadminton.com

The 2026 BWF World Championships is the 30th edition of the world badminton championships. It took place in New Delhi, India in 2026. India hosted the World Championships for the first time since 2009.

== Host selection ==
The host nation India was originally supposed to hold the Sudirman Cup in 2023, however due to all events in China getting cancelled in 2021, the Sudirman Cup was moved to Vantaa in Finland with the 2023 Sudirman Cup going to Suzhou, China. India thereby was selected as the hosts of the 2026 World Championships due to the transfer of the hosting rights of 2023 Sudirman Cup. New Delhi was announced to be the host city after the 2025 BWF World Championships at Paris.

== Competition schedule ==
The tournament lasts over 7 days.

#R	Preliminary rounds	QF	Quarter-finals	SF	Semi-finals	F	Finals

Date	17 Aug	18 Aug	19 Aug	20 Aug	21 Aug	22 Aug	23 Aug
Event	17 Aug	18 Aug	19 Aug	20 Aug	21 Aug	22 Aug	23 Aug
Men's singles	1R		2R	3R	QF	SF	F
Women's singles	1R		2R	3R	QF	SF	F
Men's doubles	1R	2R		3R	QF	SF	F
Women's doubles	1R	2R		3R	QF	SF	F
Mixed doubles		1R	2R	3R	QF	SF	F

== Point distribution ==
Below is the tables with the point distribution for each phase of the tournament based on the BWF points system for the World Championships event.

Winner	Runner-up	3/4	5/8	9/16	17/32	33/64
14,500	12,500	10,500	8,200	6,000	3,700	1,450

== Medal summary ==
=== Medal table ===
* Host nation (India)

2026 BWF World Championships medal table
Rank	Nation	Gold	Silver	Bronze	Total
1	South Korea	2	0	1	3
2	France	2	0	0	2
3	China	1	2	3	6
4	Japan	0	2	0	2
5	Malaysia	0	1	0	1
6	Chinese Taipei	0	0	2	2
7	Canada	0	0	1	1
7	India*	0	0	1	1
7	Indonesia	0	0	1	1
7	Thailand	0	0	1	1
Totals (10 entries)		5	5	10	20

=== Medalists ===
Events	Gold	Silver	Bronze
Men's singles	Alex Lanier; France	Kodai Naraoka; Japan	Chou Tien-chen; Chinese Taipei
Men's singles	Alex Lanier; France	Kodai Naraoka; Japan	Victor Lai; Canada
Women's singles	An Se-young; South Korea	Akane Yamaguchi; Japan	Wang Zhiyi; China
Women's singles	An Se-young; South Korea	Akane Yamaguchi; Japan	Pornpawee Chochuwong; Thailand
Men's doubles	China; Liang Weikeng; Wang Chang	Malaysia; Aaron Chia; Soh Wooi Yik	South Korea; Kim Won-ho; Seo Seung-jae
Men's doubles	China; Liang Weikeng; Wang Chang	Malaysia; Aaron Chia; Soh Wooi Yik	Chinese Taipei; Lee Jhe-huei; Yang Po-hsuan
Women's doubles	South Korea; Baek Ha-na; Lee So-hee	China; Liu Shengshu; Tan Ning	India; Treesa Jolly; Gayatri Gopichand
Women's doubles	South Korea; Baek Ha-na; Lee So-hee	China; Liu Shengshu; Tan Ning	China; Li Yijing; Luo Xumin
Mixed doubles	France; Thom Gicquel; Delphine Delrue	China; Feng Yanzhe; Huang Dongping	Indonesia; Amri Syahnawi; Nita Violina Marwah
Mixed doubles	France; Thom Gicquel; Delphine Delrue	China; Feng Yanzhe; Huang Dongping	China; Jiang Zhenbang; Wei Yaxin

France achieved its most successful World Championships in the tournament's history, winning two gold medals. Alex Lanier became the first French player to win a men's singles world title, while Thom Gicquel and Delphine Delrue won France's first mixed doubles world championship.

== Qualifiers ==
=== Number of participants ===
Nation		MS	WS	MD	WD	XD	Total	Number of players
Africa	Egypt	1	1		1		3	3
Africa	South Africa				1		1	2
Africa	Uganda		1				1	1
Asia	China	3	3	4	4	4	18	30
Asia	Chinese Taipei	3	2	3	4	3	15	24
Asia	Hong Kong	2	2	1	2	1	8	12
Asia	Indonesia	2	2	3	3	4	14	24
Asia	India	2	2	2	2	3	11	18
Asia	Japan	3	4	2	4	2	15	23
Asia	Kazakhstan	1					1	1
Asia	South Korea	2	3	2	1	1	9	13
Asia	Macau					1	1	2
Asia	Malaysia	2	2	4	2	2	12	20
Asia	Myanmar	1	1				2	2
Asia	Philippines	1	1	1			3	4
Asia	Singapore	2	1	2			5	7
Asia	Sri Lanka	2	1				3	3
Asia	Thailand	2	4	2	2	2	12	18
Asia	United Arab Emirates		1		1		2	3
Asia	Vietnam	2	2	1	1		6	8
Europe	Austria	1			1		2	3
Europe	Azerbaijan	2	1				3	3
Europe	Belgium	1					1	1
Europe	Bulgaria		2		1	1	4	4
Europe	Croatia	1					1	1
Europe	Czech Republic		2	2		1	5	6
Europe	Denmark	2	2	2	1	2	9	13
Europe	England	1		2		2	5	9
Europe	Estonia		1				1	1
Europe	Finland	2					2	2
Europe	France	3	1	2		2	8	10
Europe	Germany	1	2	2		2	7	10
Europe	Hungary		2				2	2
Europe	Ireland	1	1	1			3	4
Europe	Israel	2					2	2
Europe	Italy	2	1		1		4	5
Europe	Netherlands				1.5	2	3.5	6
Europe	Poland	2			1		3	4
Europe	Scotland		1	2	1	1	5	7
Europe	Serbia					1	1	2
Europe	Spain			1	2	1	4	7
Europe	Sweden	1		1	1	1	4	7
Europe	Switzerland	1	2	1	0.5	1	5.5	8
Europe	Turkey		2		2	1	5	7
Europe	Ukraine		2		1		3	2
Oceania	Australia				1		1	2
Oceania	New Zealand	1	1			1	3	3
Pan America	Brazil	2	1	1	1	2	7	7
Pan America	Canada	2	2	2	2	2	10	14
Pan America	El Salvador	1					1	1
Pan America	Guatemala	1					1	1
Pan America	Mexico		1				1	1
Pan America	Peru	1	2				3	3
Pan America	United States	2	2	1	2	2	9	10
Other	(Individual Neutral Athletes) Authorised Neutral Athletes			1			1	2
Total		64	64	48	48	48	272	382

=== Players participating in two events ===
Player	Gender	Singles	Doubles	Mixed
(Brazil) Davi Silva	Men		Yes	Yes
(Brazil) Fabricio Farias	Men		Yes	Yes
(Brazil) Jaqueline Lima	Women		Yes	Yes
(Brazil) Sâmia Lima	Women		Yes	Yes
(Bulgaria) Stefani Stoeva	Women	Yes	Yes	
(Bulgaria) Gabriela Stoeva	Women		Yes	Yes
(Canada) Jonathan Lai	Men		Yes	Yes
(Canada) Crystal Lai	Women		Yes	Yes
(Czech Republic) Ondřej Král	Men		Yes	Yes
(Czech Republic) Tereza Švábíková	Women	Yes		Yes
(Denmark) Mette Werge	Women		Yes	Yes
(Egypt) Nour Ahmed Youssri	Women	Yes	Yes	
(Spain) Lucía Rodríguez	Women		Yes	Yes
(France) Christo Popov	Men	Yes	Yes	
(France) Toma Junior Popov	Men	Yes	Yes	
(Germany) Simon Krax	Men		Yes	Yes
(Japan) Yuichi Shimogami	Men		Yes	Yes
(Japan) Sayaka Hobara	Women		Yes	Yes
(Netherlands) Meerte Loos	Women		Yes	Yes
(New Zealand) Shaunna Li	Women	Yes		Yes
(Scotland) Alexander Dunn	Men		Yes	Yes
(Scotland) Julie MacPherson	Women		Yes	Yes
(Thailand) Pakkapon Teeraratsakul	Men		Yes	Yes
(Chinese Taipei) Yang Po-hsuan	Men		Yes	Yes
(Turkey) Yasemen Bektaş	Women		Yes	Yes
(United Arab Emirates) Dhiren Ayyappan	Men		Yes	Yes
(United Arab Emirates) Taabia Khan	Women		Yes	Yes
(Ukraine) Yevheniia Kantemyr	Women	Yes	Yes	
(Ukraine) Polina Buhrova	Women	Yes	Yes	
(United States) Chen Zhi-yi	Men		Yes	Yes
(United States) Presley Smith	Men		Yes	Yes
(United States) Francesca Corbett	Women		Yes	Yes
(United States) Jennie Gai	Women		Yes	Yes

== Performance by nations ==
Nation	Quota	First round	Second round	Third round	Quarter- finals	Semi- finals	Finals	Champion
South Korea	9	6	6	6	3	3	2	2
France	8	7	4	3	2	2	2	2
China	18	9	16	13	11	6	3	1
Japan	15	10	14	10	3	2	2	
Malaysia	12	7	10	6	2	1	1	
Chinese Taipei	15	8	11	8	3	2		
Indonesia	14	8	14	8	5	1		
Thailand	12	10	10	4	3	1		
India	11	9	9	5	2	1		
Canada	10	10	4	2	2	1		
Denmark	9	6	8	7	3			
Hong Kong	8	7	7	2	1			
United States	9	7	7	3				
England	5	4	5	1				
Singapore	5	5	4	1				
Bulgaria	4	3	1	1				
Scotland	5	5	3					
Turkey	5	5	3					
Brazil	7	7	2					
Vietnam	6	6	2					
Czech Republic	5	5	2					
Ukraine	3	3	2					
Germany	7	7	1					
Switzerland	5.5	5.5	1					
Italy	4	4	1					
Spain	4	4	1					
Netherlands	3.5	3.5	1					
Azerbaijan	3	3	1					
Ireland	3	3	1					
New Zealand	3	3	1					
Poland	3	3	1					
Sri Lanka	3	3	1					
Finland	2	2	1					
Hungary	2	2	1					
Israel	2	2	1					
Myanmar	2	2	1					
Macau	1	1	1					
South Africa	1	1	1					
Sweden	4	4						
Egypt	3	3						
Peru	3	3						
Philippines	3	3						
Austria	2	2						
United Arab Emirates	2	2						
Australia	1	1						
Belgium	1	1						
Croatia	1	1						
El Salvador	1	1						
Estonia	1	1						
Guatemala	1	1						
Kazakhstan	1	1						
Mexico	1	1						
Serbia	1	1						
Uganda	1	1						
(Individual Neutral Athletes) Authorised Neutral Athletes	1	1						
Withdrew								
Total		224	160	80	40	20	10	5
