= Alex Lanier =

French badminton player (born 2005)

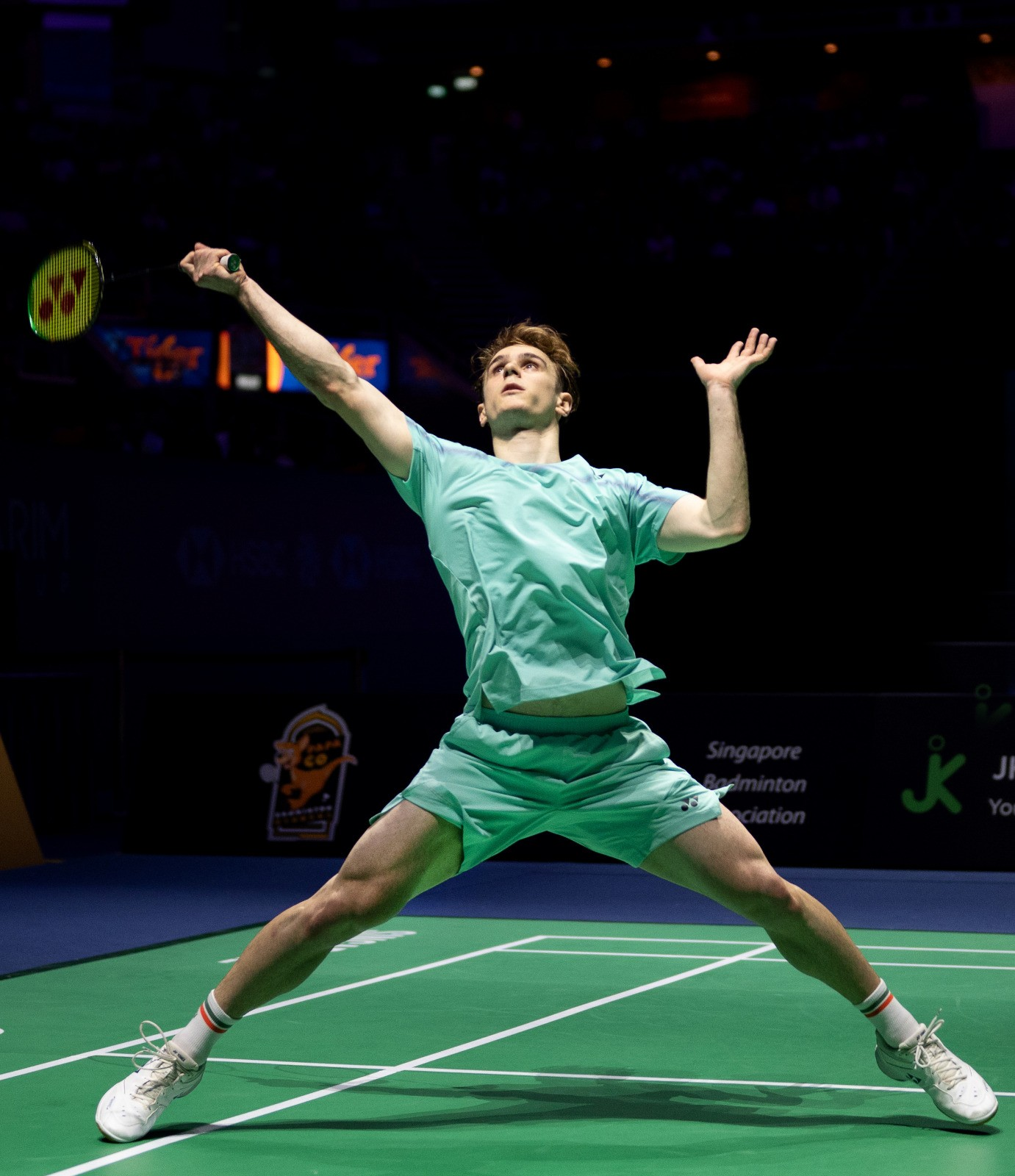
- Alex Lanier at the Singapore Open 2026

Personal information
- Born: 26 January 2005 (age 21) Caen, France
- Years active: 2020–present

Sport
- Country: France
- Sport: Badminton
- Handedness: Right
- Coached by: Kęstutis Navickas

Men's singles
- Career record: 212 wins, 69 losses
- Highest ranking: 4 (27 October 2026)
- Current ranking: 6 (10 November 2026)
- BWF profile
Medal record
Men's badminton
Representing France
World Championships
Gold medal – first place	2026 New Delhi	Men's singles
Thomas Cup
Silver medal – second place	2026 Horsens	Men's team
European Championships
Gold medal – first place	2025 Horsens	Men's singles
European Mixed Team Championships
Silver medal – second place	2023 Aire-sur-la-Lys	Mixed team
Silver medal – second place	2025 Baku	Mixed team
European Team Championships
Gold medal – first place	2026 Istanbul	Men's team
Silver medal – second place	2024 Łódź	Men's team
World Junior Championships
Bronze medal – third place	2023 Spokane	Boys' singles
European Junior Championships
Gold medal – first place	2022 Belgrade	Boys' singles
Silver medal – second place	2022 Belgrade	Mixed team

Alex Lanier (born 26 January 2005) is a French badminton player. A world champion, European champion and European junior champion, he won gold medals in the 2026 World Championships, the 2025 European Championships and the 2022 European Junior Championships. He is also a bronze medalist at the 2023 World Junior Championships. As a French badminton player in men's singles, he became the first ever world champion, European champion and BWF World Tour Super 750 tournament champion in history by also winning the 2024 Japan Open. He is also the second-youngest men's singles world champion in history at 21 years old after Icuk Sugiarto who achieved the same feat at the 1983 World Championships at 20.

== Career ==
Alex Lanier started playing badminton at the age of 3 and later joined the Dives-sur-Mer badminton club. In 2019, he left the Dives-sur-Mer, to join the club of Strasbourg, to compete in the French interclub division. In 2020, he joined INSEP at the age of only 15.

In June 2021, Lanier competed in the Lithuanian International tournament and won his first international title in the final by defeating Canada's player B. R. Sankeerth. Afterwards, he managed to advance to the final at the Latvia International, but lost to India's Meiraba Luwang Maisnam. He bounced back at the Italian International and won his second international title by defeating Czech player Jan Louda.

Lanier opened the 2022 season by winning the Estonian International. He then clinched the boys' singles title at the European Junior Championships. In October, he secured his first win on a World Tour event at the age of only 17, as he defeated Japanese Takuma Obayashi at the Canada Open.

Lanier started the 2023 season as a finalist in the Estonian International. He participated at the European Mixed Team Championships, where the team finished runner-up. He then went to win his first title of the year at the Polish Open. In October, he won a bronze medal at the World Junior Championships. At the end of the season, he reached the finals in the Irish Open, and semi-finals in the BWF World Tour, the Hylo Open and Syed Modi International.

Lanier won his first title in 2024 at the Luxembourg Open. In the next tournament, he finished as finalist in the Denmark Challenge and won the Nantes International. He played at the Canada Open, losing the final to Koki Watanabe. Lanier then won the Japan Open title at a young age 19 years old. He defeated seeded player en-route to the final. The 19-year-old did it in sensational fashion, taking down world number 1 Shi Yuqi in rubber games in the semi-finals. By winning the Japan Open, he became the first ever French player to win a BWF World Tour Super 750 event.

Despite an early losses at the Malaysia and India Opens in January, Lanier went on to win his maiden title in 2025 at the Orleans Masters. He then entered to top 10 men's singles at the BWF World ranking on 11 March 2025. In his debut at the All England Open, he managed to reach the semi-finals losing to Lee Chia-hao. He managed to win the 2025 European Championships title, becoming the first ever French men's singles player to win the title. He also finished runner-up in the Japan Open.

In 2026, Lanier and the French team captured the gold medal by breaking Denmark's long-standing dominance in the European Men's Team Championships. He then won the home soil title in the Orléans Masters defeating Toma Junior Popov in the final. He also made history with the French team, which reached the final of the Thomas Cup for the first time, and won the silver medal after being defeated by China. A month later, he won the Singapore Open against the home favourite, Loh Kean Yew in the final.

He became a world champion in the 2026 BWF World Championships, held in New Delhi, India, after beating Kodai Naraoka by 21–11 and 21–11. It was the first world title in men's single category for France. Two months later, he grabbed a Denmark Open title against another home favourite, Anders Antonsen in three games.

== Achievements ==
=== BWF World Championships ===
Men's singles
Year	Venue	Opponent	Score	Result	Ref.
2026	Indira Gandhi Arena; New Delhi, India	(Japan) Kodai Naraoka	21–11, 21–11	Gold	

=== European Championships ===
Men's singles
Year	Venue	Opponent	Score	Result	Ref.
2025	Forum; Horsens, Denmark	(France) Toma Junior Popov	21–17, 21–18	Gold	

=== BWF World Junior Championships ===
Boys' singles
Year	Venue	Opponent	Score	Result	Ref.
2023	The Podium; Spokane, United States	(China) Hu Zhe'an	20–22, 20–22	Bronze	

=== European Junior Championships ===
Boys' singles
Year	Venue	Opponent	Score	Result	Ref.
2022	Athletic Hall Belgrade; Belgrade, Serbia	(Denmark) Jakob Houe	21–18, 21–12	Gold	

=== BWF World Tour (6 titles, 2 runners-up) ===
The BWF World Tour, which was announced on 19 March 2017 and implemented in 2018, is a series of elite badminton tournaments sanctioned by the Badminton World Federation (BWF). The BWF World Tour is divided into levels of World Tour Finals, Super 1000, Super 750, Super 500, Super 300, and the BWF Tour Super 100.

Men's singles
Year	Tournament	Level	Opponent	Score	Result	Ref.
2022	Canada Open	Super 100	(Japan) Takuma Obayashi	21–12, 12–21, 21–13	(gold) Winner	
2024	Canada Open	Super 500	(Japan) Koki Watanabe	22–20, 17–21, 6–21	(silver) Runner-up	
2024	Japan Open	Super 750	(Chinese Taipei) Chou Tien-chen	21–17, 22–20	(gold) Winner	
2025	Orléans Masters	Super 300	(Chinese Taipei) Lin Chun-yi	21–13, 21–18	(gold) Winner	
2025	Japan Open	Super 750	(China) Shi Yuqi	17–21, 15–21	(silver) Runner-up	
2026	Orléans Masters	Super 300	(France) Toma Junior Popov	21–11, 21–13	(gold) Winner	
2026	Singapore Open	Super 750	(Singapore) Loh Kean Yew	17–21, 21–15, 21–14	(gold) Winner	
2026	Denmark Open	Super 750	(Denmark) Anders Antonsen	21–15, 13–21, 21–13	(gold) Winner	

=== BWF International Challenge / Series (6 titles, 4 runners-up) ===
Men's singles
Year	Tournament	Opponent	Score	Result	Ref.
2021	Lithuanian International	(Canada) B. R. Sankeerth	18–21, 23–21, 21–15	(gold) Winner	
2021	Latvia International	(India) Meiraba Maisnam	15–21, 21–12, 20–22	(silver) Runner-up	
2021	Italian International	(Czech Republic) Jan Louda	21–12, 18–21, 21–11	(gold) Winner	
2022	Estonian International	(Malaysia) Kok Jing Hong	22–20, 21–15	(gold) Winner	
2023	Estonian International	(Japan) Yushi Tanaka	13–21, 21–15, 12–21	(silver) Runner-up	
2023	Polish Open	(Finland) Kalle Koljonen	21–14, 21–15	(gold) Winner	
2023	Irish Open	(Republic of Ireland) Nhat Nguyen	13–21, 19–21	(silver) Runner-up	
2024	Luxembourg Open	(Singapore) Jason Teh	21–17, 21–15	(gold) Winner	
2024	Denmark Challenge	(Japan) Yushi Tanaka	21–15, 12–21, 11–21	(silver) Runner-up	
2024	Nantes International	(Spain) Pablo Abián	21–14, 21–13	(gold) Winner	

BWF International Challenge tournament
BWF International Series tournament
BWF Future Series tournament

== Performance timeline ==
Key

W	Won	F	Finalist	SF	Semi-finalist
QF	Quarter-finalist	#R	Rounds 4, 3, 2, 1	RR	Round-robin stage
Q#	Qualification round	A	Absent	w/d	Withdrew
G	Gold	S	Silver	B	Bronze
NH	Not held	N/A	Not applicable	DNQ	Did not qualify

=== Individual competitions ===
- Senior level

Events	2025	2026
World Championships	3R	G

Tournament	BWF World Tour					Best	Ref
Tournament	2022	2023	2024	2025	2026	Best	Ref
Malaysia Open	A			1R	QF	QF ('26)	
India Open	A			2R	1R	2R ('25)	
Indonesia Masters	A		Q2	A		Q2 ('24)	
German Open	A	1R	2R	A		2R ('24)	
All England Open	A			SF	1R	SF ('25)	
Swiss Open	A		2R	A		2R ('24)	
Orléans Masters	Q1	QF	QF	W	W	W ('25, '26)	
Malaysia Masters	A				2R	2R ('25)	
Singapore Open	A			1R	W	W ('25)	
Indonesia Open	A			QF	QF	QF ('25, '26)	
U.S. Open	NH	A	1R	A		1R ('24)	
Canada Open	W	A	F	A		W ('22)	
Japan Open	A		W	F	2R	W ('24)	
China Open	NH	A		1R	A	1R ('25)	
China Masters	NH	A	2R	QF	w/d	QF ('25)	
Arctic Open	A		QF	A		QF ('24)	
Denmark Open	A		SF	SF	W	W ('26)	
French Open	A			1R	SF	'SF ('26)	
Hylo Open	A	SF	w/d	SF	A	SF ('23, '25)	
Korea Open	A		1R	A		1R ('24)	
Japan Masters	N/A	A	1R	A		1R ('24)	
Hong Kong Open	A				Q	('26)	
Al Ain Masters	N/A	QF	NH	A		QF ('23)	
Syed Modi International	A	SF	A			QF ('23)	
Guwahati Masters	N/A	QF	A			QF ('23)	
Spain Masters	NH	Q2	A	NH		Q2 ('23)	
World Tour Finals	DNQ				Q	('26)	
Year-end ranking	65	44	18	8		4	
