= Kodai Naraoka =

Japanese badminton player (born 2001)

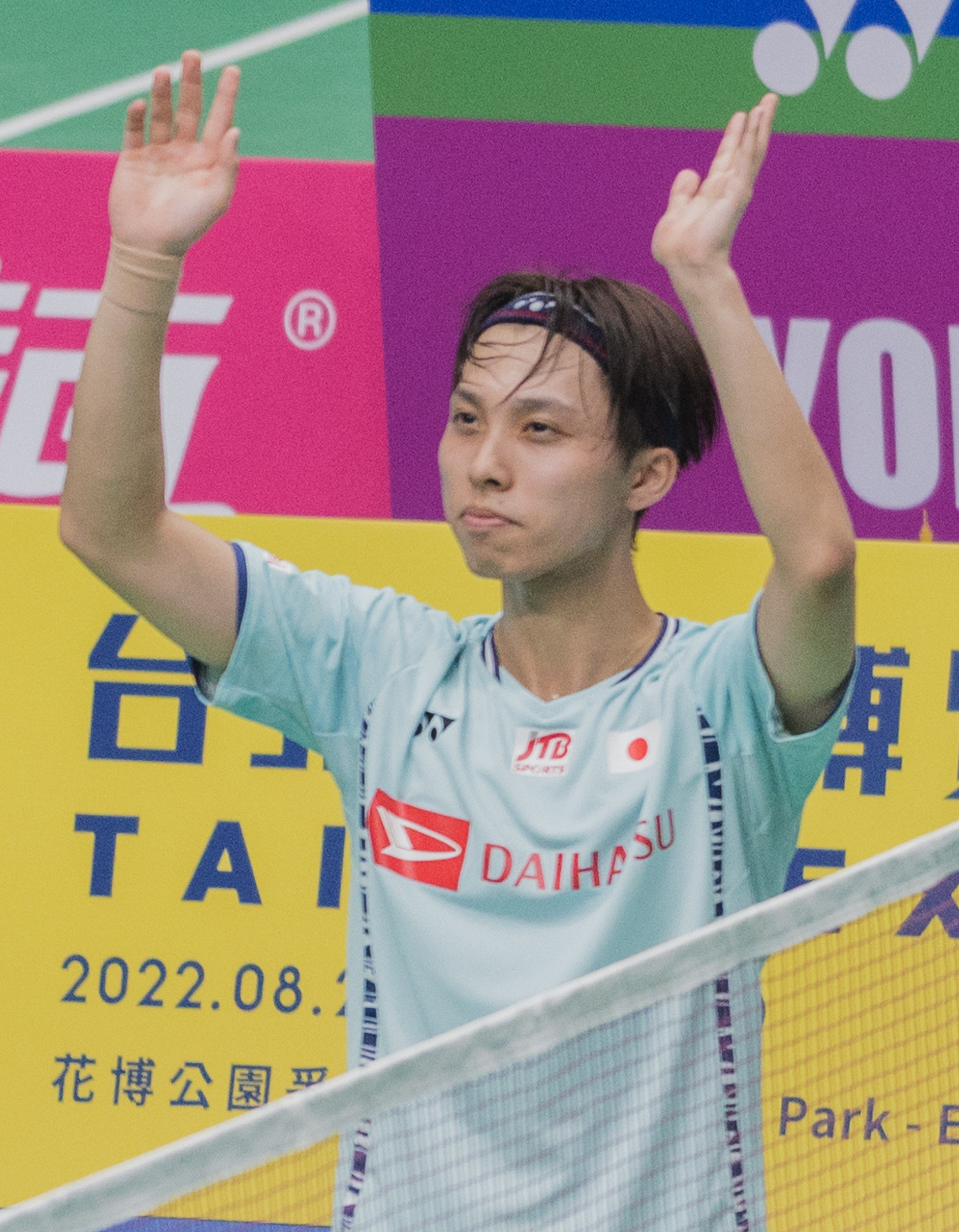
- Naraoka at the 2022 Taipei Open

Personal information
- Born: 30 June 2001 (age 25) Aomori, Japan
- Height: 1.73 m (5 ft 8 in)
- Weight: 69 kg (152 lb)

Sport
- Country: Japan
- Sport: Badminton
- Handedness: Right
- Coached by: Sho Sasaki; Naraoka Hiroshi

Men's singles
- Career record: 268 wins, 136 losses
- Highest ranking: 2 (12 December 2023)
- Current ranking: 9 (17 November 2026)
- BWF profile
Medal record
Men's badminton
Representing Japan
World Championships
Silver medal – second place	2023 Copenhagen	Men's singles
Silver medal – second place	2026 New Delhi	Men's singles
Sudirman Cup
Bronze medal – third place	2023 Suzhou	Mixed team
Bronze medal – third place	2025 Xiamen	Mixed team
Thomas Cup
Bronze medal – third place	2020 Aarhus	Men's team
Bronze medal – third place	2022 Bangkok	Men's team
Asian Games
Bronze medal – third place	2022 Hangzhou	Men's singles
Bronze medal – third place	2022 Hangzhou	Men's team
Asian Championships
Bronze medal – third place	2024 Ningbo	Men's singles
Asia Team Championships
Bronze medal – third place	2020 Manila	Men's team
Bronze medal – third place	2024 Selangor	Men's team
Youth Olympic Games
Bronze medal – third place	2018 Buenos Aires	Boys' singles
World Junior Championships
Silver medal – second place	2018 Markham	Boys' singles
Bronze medal – third place	2016 Bilbao	Mixed team
Bronze medal – third place	2017 Yogyakarta	Boys' singles
Bronze medal – third place	2017 Yogyakarta	Mixed team
Bronze medal – third place	2018 Markham	Mixed team
Asian Junior Championships
Bronze medal – third place	2017 Jakarta	Mixed team
Representing (International Olympic Committee) Mixed-NOCs
Youth Olympic Games
Bronze medal – third place	2018 Buenos Aires	Mixed team

Kodai Naraoka (奈良岡 功大, Naraoka Kōdai; born 30 June 2001) is a Japanese badminton player affiliated with NTT East. Born in Aomori, he started playing badminton at the age of 5 with the influence of his father. He won the silver medal at the 2023 and 2026 BWF World Championships.

In his junior career, Naraoka has won a silver at the World Junior Championships in 2018, where he previously claimed a bronze in 2017. He represented his country competed at the 2018 Summer Youth Olympics in Buenos Aires, Argentina, won the bronze medals in the boys' singles and mixed team event.

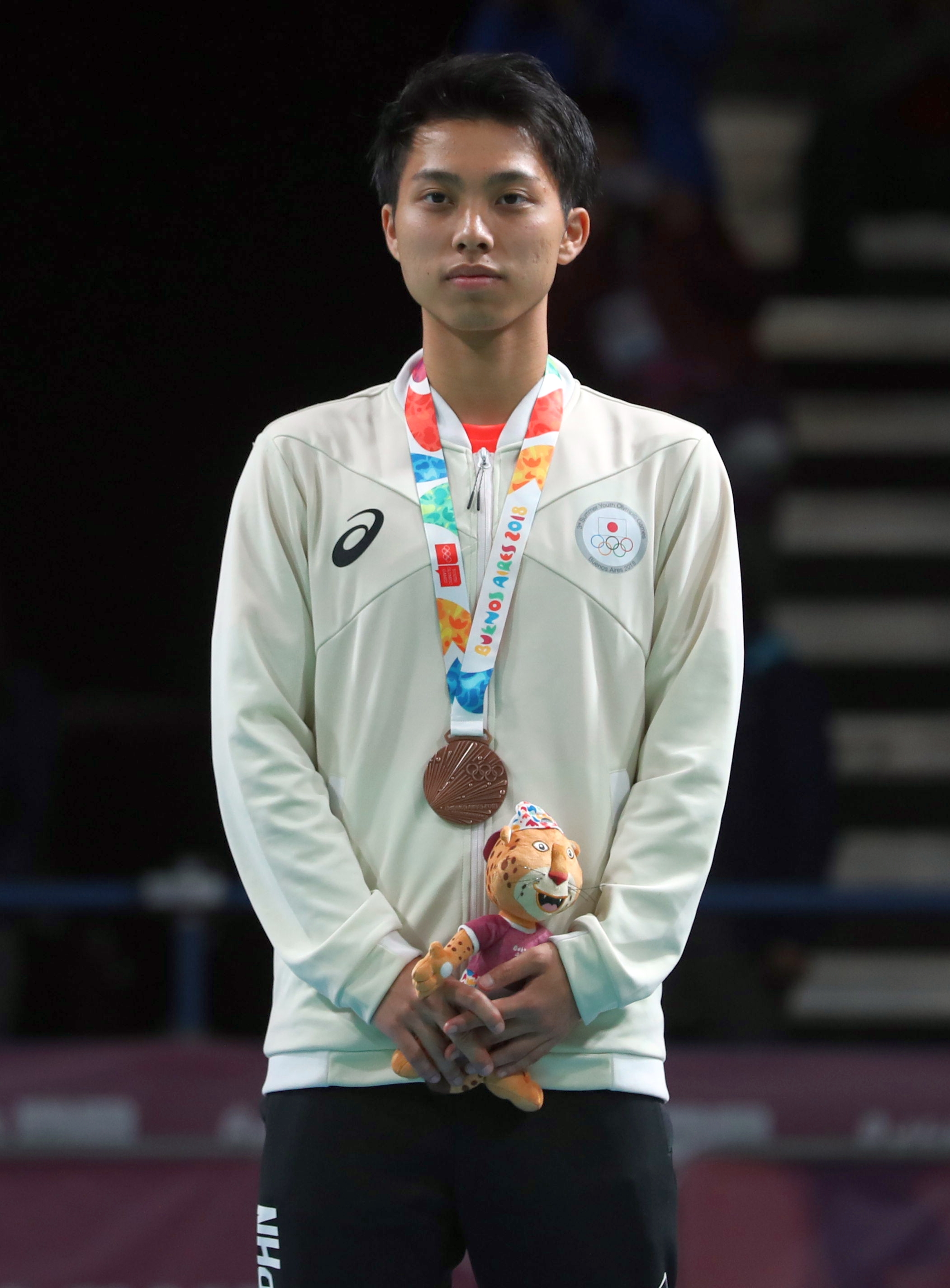
Naraoka with his 2018 Summer Youth Olympics boys' singles bronze medal

He competed for Japan at the 2024 Summer Olympics in the men's singles event.

== Awards and nominations ==
Award	Year	Category	Result	Ref.
BWF Awards	2022	Eddy Choong Most Promising Player of the Year	Won	

== Achievements ==
=== World Championships ===
Men's singles
Year	Venue	Opponent	Score	Result	Ref.
2023	Royal Arena; Copenhagen, Denmark	(Thailand) Kunlavut Vitidsarn	21–19, 18–21, 7–21	Silver	
2026	Indira Gandhi Arena; New Delhi, India	(France) Alex Lanier	11–21, 11–21	Silver	

=== Asian Games ===
Men's singles
Year	Venue	Opponent	Score	Result	Ref.
2022	Binjiang Gymnasium; Hangzhou, China	(China) Shi Yuqi	5–21, 15–21	Bronze	

=== Asian Championships ===
Men's singles
Year	Venue	Opponent	Score	Result	Ref.
2024	Ningbo Olympic Sports Center Gymnasium; Ningbo, China	(China) Li Shifeng	21–14, 15–21, 12–21	Bronze	

=== Youth Olympic Games ===
Boys' singles
Year	Venue	Opponent	Score	Result	Ref.
2018	Tecnópolis; Buenos Aires, Argentina	(France) Arnaud Merklé	21–17, 24–26, 22–20	Bronze	

=== World Junior Championships ===
Boys' singles
Year	Venue	Opponent	Score	Result	Ref.
2017	Among Rogo Sports Hall; Yogyakarta, Indonesia	(Malaysia) Leong Jun Hao	14–21, 20–22	Bronze	
2018	Markham Pan Am Centre; Markham, Canada	(Thailand) Kunlavut Vitidsarn	9–21, 11–21	Silver	

=== BWF World Tour (3 titles, 6 runners-up) ===
The BWF World Tour, which was announced on 19 March 2017 and implemented in 2018, is a series of elite badminton tournaments sanctioned by the Badminton World Federation (BWF). The BWF World Tour is divided into levels of World Tour Finals, Super 1000, Super 750, Super 500, Super 300, and the BWF Tour Super 100.

Men's singles
Year	Tournament	Level	Opponent	Score	Result	Ref.
2022	Korea Masters	Super 300	(South Korea) Jeon Hyeok-jin	17–21, 16–21	(silver) Runner-up	
2022	Singapore Open	Super 500	(Indonesia) Anthony Sinisuka Ginting	21–23, 17–21	(silver) Runner-up	
2022	Taipei Open	Super 300	(Chinese Taipei) Chou Tien-chen	21–14, 10–21, 6–21	(silver) Runner-up	
2022	Vietnam Open	Super 100	(China) Sun Feixiang	10–21, 21–14, 21–17	(gold) Winner	
2023	Malaysia Open	Super 1000	(Denmark) Viktor Axelsen	6–21, 15–21	(silver) Runner-up	
2023	China Masters	Super 750	(Japan) Kenta Nishimoto	21–13, 21–13	(gold) Winner	
2024	Australian Open	Super 500	(Malaysia) Lee Zii Jia	19–21, 21–11, 18–21	(silver) Runner-up	
2024	China Open	Super 1000	(China) Weng Hongyang	17–21, 12–21	(silver) Runner-up	
2025	Japan Masters	Super 500	(Japan) Kenta Nishimoto	21–11, 10–21, 21–15	(gold) Winner	

=== BWF International Challenge/Series (5 titles, 2 runners-up) ===
Men's singles
Year	Tournament	Opponent	Score	Result
2018	Osaka International	(Japan) Yu Igarashi	21–14, 11–21, 12–21	(silver) Runner-up
2018	Yonex / K&D Graphics International	(Japan) Koki Watanabe	14–21, 21–14, 15–21	(silver) Runner-up
2019	Lao International	(Japan) Minoru Koga	22–20, 22–20	(gold) Winner
2019	Jamaica International	(Guatemala) Kevin Cordón	21–17, 21–8	(gold) Winner
2019	Mongolia International	(Thailand) Kunlavut Vitidsarn	9–21, 21–17, 23–21	(gold) Winner
2019	Dubai International	(Japan) Yusuke Onodera	21–14, 21–17	(gold) Winner
2019	Yonex / K&D Graphics International	(Canada) Jason Ho-Shue	21–13, 21–14	(gold) Winner

BWF International Challenge tournament
BWF International Series tournament

=== BWF Junior International (1 runner-up) ===
Boys' singles
Year	Tournament	Opponent	Score	Result	Ref.
2015	Australian Junior International	(Japan) Kenya Mitsuhashi	20–22, 21–14, 16–21	(silver) Runner-up	

BWF Junior Future Series tournament

== Record against selected opponents ==
Record against year-end Finals finalists, World Championships semi-finalists, and Olympic quarter-finalists. Accurate as of 6 October 2026.

Player	Matches	Win	Lost	Diff.
(Canada) Victor Lai	1	0	1	–1
(China) Shi Yuqi	16	5	11	–6
(China) Zhao Junpeng	1	1	0	+1
(Chinese Taipei) Chou Tien-chen	9	3	6	–3
(Denmark) Anders Antonsen	10	5	5	0
(Denmark) Viktor Axelsen	7	1	6	–5
(France) Alex Lanier	2	1	1	0
(France) Christo Popov	8	3	5	–2
(Guatemala) Kevin Cordón	1	1	0	+1
(India) Srikanth Kidambi	4	4	0	+4

Player	Matches	Win	Lost	Diff.
(India) Prannoy H. S.	7	6	1	+5
(India) Lakshya Sen	9	6	3	+3
(Indonesia) Anthony Sinisuka Ginting	4	1	3	–2
(Indonesia) Sony Dwi Kuncoro	1	1	0	+1
(Malaysia) Lee Zii Jia	6	3	3	0
(Malaysia) Liew Daren	1	1	0	+1
(Singapore) Loh Kean Yew	8	0	8	–8
(Thailand) Kunlavut Vitidsarn	14	5	9	–4
(Thailand) Kantaphon Wangcharoen	3	3	0	+3
