= Chou Tien-chen =

Taiwanese badminton player (born 1990)

Chou Tien-chen 周天成
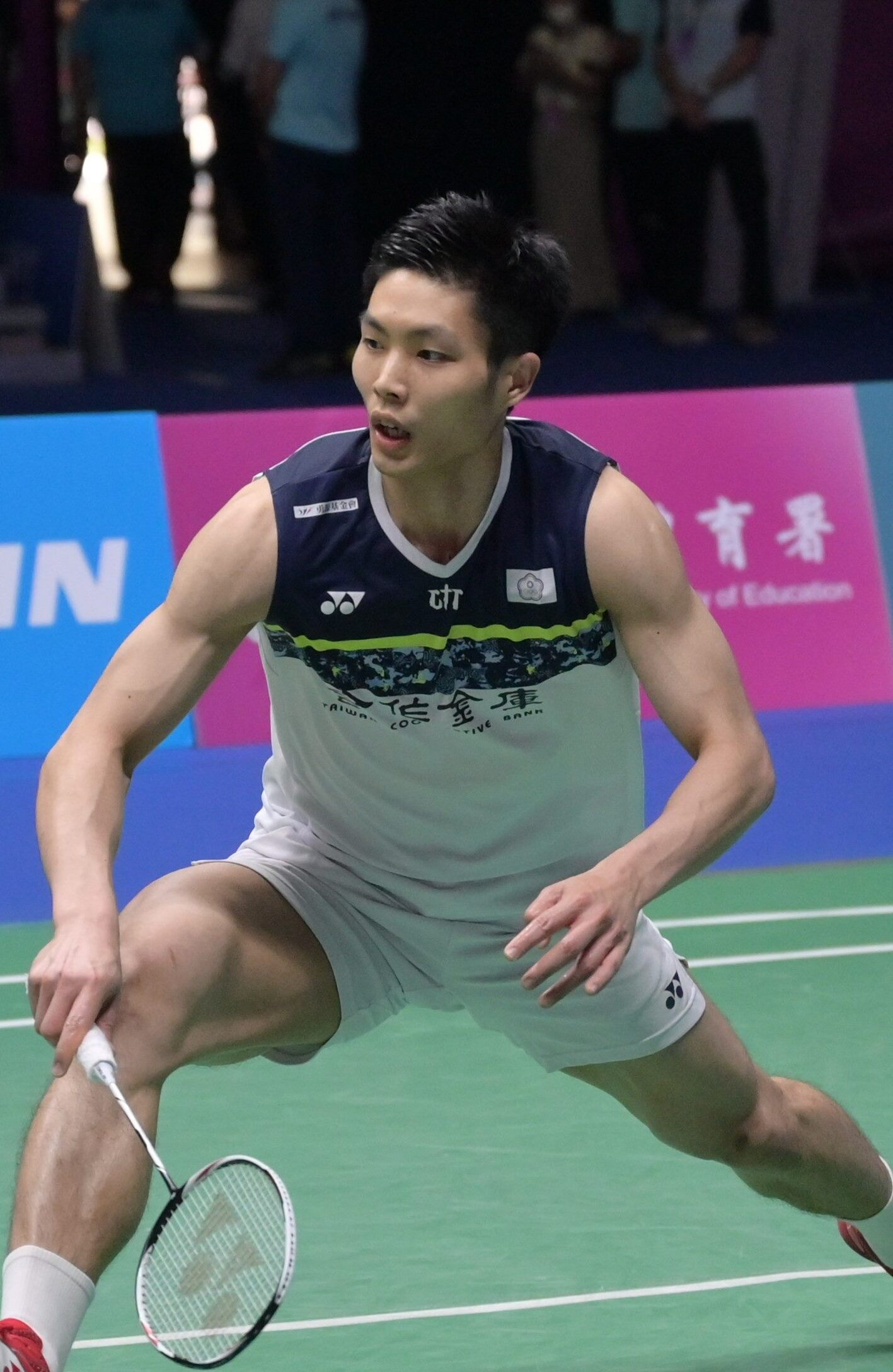
- Chou in 2022

Personal information
- Born: 8 January 1990 (age 36) Taipei, Taiwan
- Height: 1.80 m (5 ft 11 in)
- Weight: 78 kg (172 lb)

Sport
- Country: Taiwan
- Sport: Badminton
- Handedness: Right

Men's singles
- Career record: 543 wins, 303 losses
- Highest ranking: 2 (6 August 2019)
- Current ranking: 5 (10 November 2026)
- BWF profile
Medal record
Men's badminton
Representing Chinese Taipei
World Championships
Bronze medal – third place	2022 Tokyo	Men's singles
Bronze medal – third place	2026 New Delhi	Men's singles
Thomas Cup
Bronze medal – third place	2024 Chengdu	Men's team
Asian Games
Silver medal – second place	2018 Jakarta–Palembang	Men's singles
Bronze medal – third place	2014 Incheon	Men's team
Bronze medal – third place	2018 Jakarta–Palembang	Men's team
Asian Championships
Bronze medal – third place	2019 Wuhan	Men's singles
Bronze medal – third place	2026 Ningbo	Men's singles
East Asian Games
Bronze medal – third place	2013 Tianjin	Men's team
Summer Universiade
Bronze medal – third place	2011 Shenzhen	Mixed team
Bronze medal – third place	2013 Kazan	Men's doubles
Bronze medal – third place	2013 Kazan	Mixed team
Bronze medal – third place	2015 Gwangju	Men's singles
Asian Junior Championships
Bronze medal – third place	2008 Kuala Lumpur	Mixed doubles

Chou Tien-chen (Chinese: 周天成; pinyin: Zhōu Tiānchéng; born 8 January 1990) is a Taiwanese badminton player. He became the first local shuttler in 17 years to win the men's singles title of the Chinese Taipei Open in 2016 since Indonesian-born Fung Permadi won it in 1999. He won his first BWF Super Series title at the 2014 French Open, beating Wang Zhengming of China 10–21, 25–23, 21–19 in the finals. He is the record holder of three consecutive Hylo Open titles from 2012 till 2014.

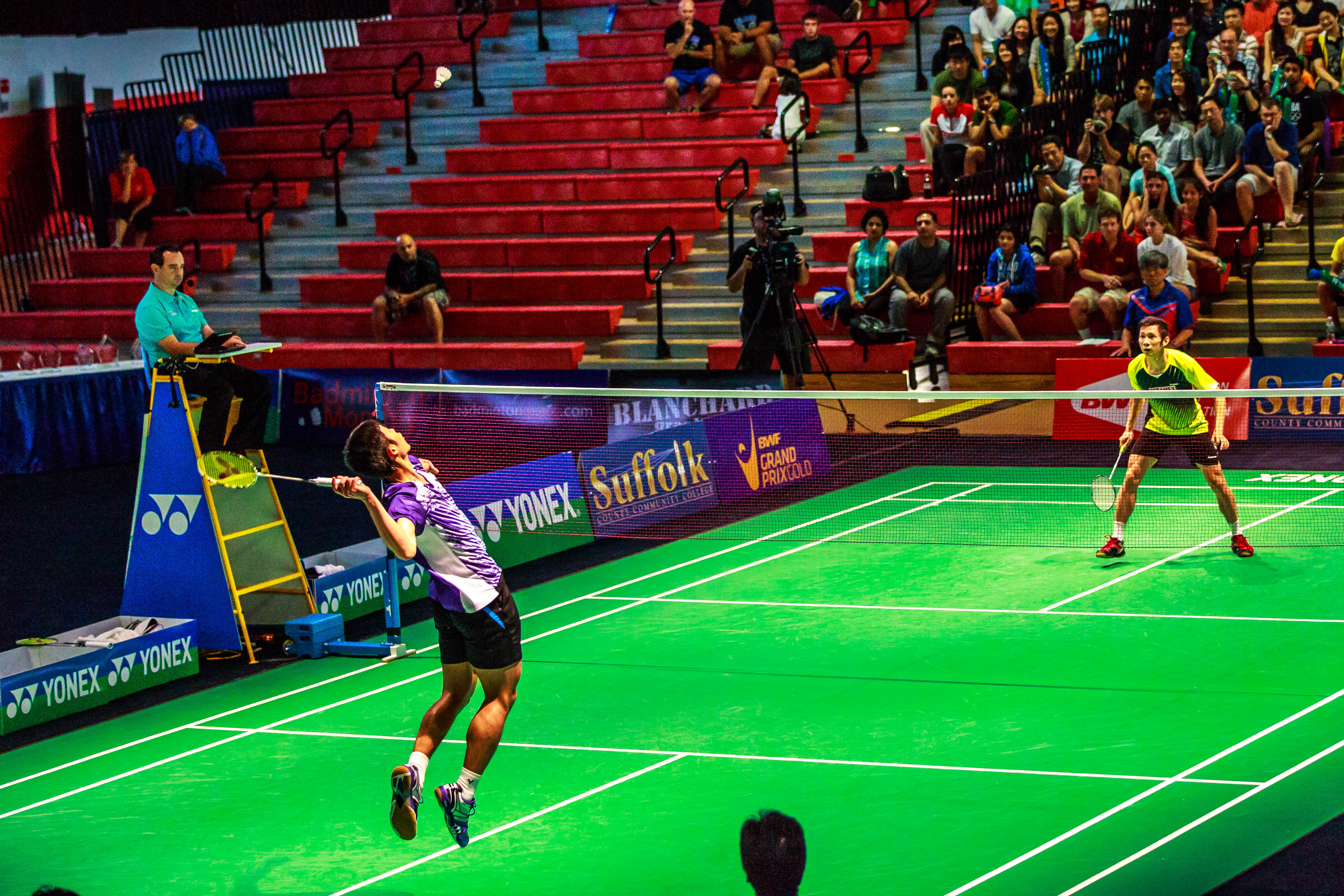
Chou against Nguyễn Tiến Minh in the final of 2014 U.S. Open

== Achievements ==
=== World Championships ===
Men's singles
Year	Venue	Opponent	Score	Result
2022	Tokyo Metropolitan Gymnasium; Tokyo, Japan	(Denmark) Viktor Axelsen	15–21, 17–21	Bronze
2026	Indira Gandhi Arena; New Delhi, India	(Japan) Kodai Naraoka	21–17, 11–21, 10–21	Bronze

=== Asian Games ===
Men's singles
Year	Venue	Opponent	Score	Result
2018	Istora Gelora Bung Karno; Jakarta, Indonesia	(Indonesia) Jonatan Christie	18–21, 22–20, 15–21	Silver

=== Asian Championships ===
Men's singles
Year	Venue	Opponent	Score	Result
2019	Wuhan Sports Center Gymnasium; Wuhan, China	(China) Shi Yuqi	20–22, 18–21	Bronze
2026	Ningbo Olympic Sports Center Gymnasium; Ningbo, China	(China) Shi Yuqi	9–21, 13–21	Bronze

=== World University Games ===
Men's singles
Year	Venue	Opponent	Score	Result
2013	Tennis Academy; Kazan, Russia	(China) Gao Huan	9–21, 9–21	Bronze
2015	Hwasun Hanium Culture Sports Center; Hwasun, South Korea	(South Korea) Jeon Hyeok-jin	19–21, 19–21	Bronze

=== Asian Junior Championships ===
Mixed doubles
Year	Venue	Partner	Opponent	Score	Result
2008	Stadium Juara; Kuala Lumpur, Malaysia	(Chinese Taipei) Chiang Kai-hsin	(China) Zhang Nan (China) Lu Lu	19–21, 19–21	Bronze

=== World Tour (12 titles, 15 runners-up) ===
The BWF World Tour, which was announced on 19 March 2017 and implemented in 2018, is a series of elite badminton tournaments sanctioned by the Badminton World Federation (BWF). The BWF World Tour is divided into levels of World Tour Finals, Super 1000, Super 750, Super 500, Super 300, and the BWF Tour Super 100.

Men's singles
Year	Tournament	Level	Opponent	Score	Result
2018	India Open	Super 500	(China) Shi Yuqi	18–21, 14–21	(silver) Runner-up
2018	German Open	Super 300	(Hong Kong) Ng Ka Long	21–19, 18–21, 21–18	(gold) Winner
2018	Singapore Open	Super 500	(Chinese Taipei) Hsu Jen-hao	21–13, 21–13	(gold) Winner
2018	Korea Open	Super 500	(Indonesia) Tommy Sugiarto	21–13, 21–16	(gold) Winner
2018	Denmark Open	Super 750	(Japan) Kento Momota	20–22, 21–16, 15–21	(silver) Runner-up
2018	Fuzhou China Open	Super 750	(Japan) Kento Momota	13–21, 21–11, 16–21	(silver) Runner-up
2019	Indonesia Open	Super 1000	(Denmark) Anders Antonsen	21–18, 24–26, 21–15	(gold) Winner
2019	Thailand Open	Super 500	(Hong Kong) Ng Ka Long	21–14, 11–21, 23–21	(gold) Winner
2019	Chinese Taipei Open	Super 300	(South Korea) Heo Kwang-hee	21–12, 21–13	(gold) Winner
2019	Korea Open	Super 500	(Japan) Kento Momota	19–21, 17–21	(silver) Runner-up
2019	Fuzhou China Open	Super 750	(Japan) Kento Momota	15–21, 21–17, 18–21	(silver) Runner-up
2020	All England Open	Super 1000	(Denmark) Viktor Axelsen	13–21, 14–21	(silver) Runner-up
2021	French Open	Super 750	(Japan) Kanta Tsuneyama	21–15, 8–21, 17–21	(silver) Runner-up
2022	Indonesia Masters	Super 500	(Denmark) Viktor Axelsen	10–21, 12–21	(silver) Runner-up
2022	Taipei Open	Super 300	(Japan) Kodai Naraoka	14–21, 21–10, 21–6	(gold) Winner
2022	Japan Open	Super 750	(Japan) Kenta Nishimoto	19–21, 23–21, 17–21	(silver) Runner-up
2022	Hylo Open	Super 300	(Indonesia) Anthony Sinisuka Ginting	21–18, 11–21, 22–24	(silver) Runner-up
2023	Swiss Open	Super 300	(Japan) Koki Watanabe	20–22, 21–18, 12–21	(silver) Runner-up
2023	Hylo Open	Super 300	(Hong Kong) Lee Cheuk Yiu	21–23, 21–17, 21–10	(gold) Winner
2024	Thailand Masters	Super 300	(Singapore) Loh Kean Yew	21–16, 6–21, 21–16	(gold) Winner
2024	Swiss Open	Super 300	(Chinese Taipei) Lin Chun-yi	21–7, 20–22, 21–23	(silver) Runner-up
2024	Japan Open	Super 750	(France) Alex Lanier	17–21, 20–22	(silver) Runner-up
2024	Arctic Open	Super 500	(Indonesia) Jonatan Christie	21–18, 21–17	(gold) Winner
2025	Taipei Open	Super 300	(Singapore) Loh Kean Yew	14–21, 21–15, 20–22	(silver) Runner-up
2025	Indonesia Open	Super 1000	(Denmark) Anders Antonsen	20–22, 14–21	(silver) Runner-up
2025	Arctic Open	Super 500	(Thailand) Kunlavut Vitidsarn	21–11, 13–21, 21–19	(gold) Winner
2026	China Open	Super 1000	(France) Toma Junior Popov	21–15, 7–21, 21–13	(gold) Winner

=== Superseries (1 title, 2 runners-up) ===
The BWF Superseries, which was launched on 14 December 2006 and implemented in 2007, was a series of elite badminton tournaments, sanctioned by the Badminton World Federation (BWF). BWF Superseries levels were Superseries and Superseries Premier. A season of Superseries consisted of twelve tournaments around the world that had been introduced since 2011. Successful players were invited to the Superseries Finals, which were held at the end of each year.

Men's singles
Year	Tournament	Opponent	Score	Result
2014	French Open	(China) Wang Zhengming	10–21, 25–23, 21–19	(gold) Winner
2015	French Open	(Malaysia) Lee Chong Wei	13–21, 18–21	(silver) Runner-up
2017	India Open	(Denmark) Viktor Axelsen	13–21, 10–21	(silver) Runner-up

BWF Super Series Finals tournament
BWF Super Series Premier tournament
BWF Super Series tournament

=== BWF Grand Prix (7 titles, 6 runners-up) ===
The BWF Grand Prix had two levels, the Grand Prix and Grand Prix Gold. It was a series of badminton tournaments sanctioned by the Badminton World Federation (BWF) and played between 2007 and 2017.

Men's singles
Year	Tournament	Opponent	Score	Result
2011	Dutch Open	(Chinese Taipei) Hsueh Hsuan-yi	21–18, 15–21, 16–21	(silver) Runner-up
2012	Canada Open	(Chinese Taipei) Lin Yu-hsien	15–21, 21–16, 21–9	(gold) Winner
2012	Chinese Taipei Open	(Vietnam) Nguyễn Tiến Minh	11–21, 17–21	(silver) Runner-up
2012	Bitburger Open	(Germany) Marc Zwiebler	21–19, 21–12	(gold) Winner
2013	Bitburger Open	(Germany) Marc Zwiebler	13–21, 21–18, 21–15	(gold) Winner
2014	U.S. Open	(Vietnam) Nguyễn Tiến Minh	19–21, 21–14, 19–21	(silver) Runner-up
2014	Bitburger Open	(Republic of Ireland) Scott Evans	21–17, 21–10	(gold) Winner
2015	Chinese Taipei Open	(China) Chen Long	21–15, 9–21, 6–21	(silver) Runner-up
2016	German Open	(China) Lin Dan	21–15, 17–21, 17–21	(silver) Runner-up
2016	Chinese Taipei Open	(China) Qiao Bin	21–18, 21–17	(gold) Winner
2016	Macau Open	(China) Zhao Junpeng	11–21, 19–21	(silver) Runner-up
2017	German Open	(Chinese Taipei) Wang Tzu-wei	21–16, 21–14	(gold) Winner
2017	Chinese Taipei Open	(Chinese Taipei) Wang Tzu-wei	18–21, 21–19, 21–15	(gold) Winner

BWF Grand Prix Gold tournament
BWF Grand Prix tournament

=== BWF International Challenge/Series (4 titles) ===
Men's singles
Year	Tournament	Opponent	Score	Result
2012	Iceland International	(South Korea) Ha Young-woong	21–19, 23–21	(gold) Winner
2012	Norwegian International	(Malaysia) Tan Chun Seang	21–17, 21–12	(gold) Winner
2012	Welsh International	(Malaysia) Kuan Beng Hong	21–15, 21–13	(gold) Winner

Mixed doubles
Year	Tournament	Partner	Opponent	Score	Result
2012	Iceland International	(Chinese Taipei) Chiang Mei-hui	(Iceland) Helgi Jóhannesson (Iceland) Elín Þóra Elíasdóttir	21–16, 21–9	(gold) Winner

BWF International Challenge tournament
BWF International Series tournament

== Record against selected opponents ==
Record against Year-end Finals finalists, World Championships semi-finalists, and Olympic quarter-finalists. Accurate as of 11 October 2025.

Player	Matches	Win	Lost	Diff.
(China) Bao Chunlai	1	0	1	–1
(China) Chen Long	10	0	10	–10
(China) Du Pengyu	4	1	3	–2
(China) Lin Dan	10	3	7	–4
(China) Shi Yuqi	13	4	9	–5
(China) Tian Houwei	4	4	0	+4
(China) Zhao Junpeng	5	3	2	+1
(Denmark) Viktor Axelsen	23	4	19	–15
(Denmark) Anders Antonsen	11	7	4	+3
(Denmark) Jan Ø. Jørgensen	12	6	6	0
(Denmark) Hans-Kristian Vittinghus	9	7	2	+5
(England) Rajiv Ouseph	3	1	2	–1
(Guatemala) Kevin Cordón	1	1	0	+1
(India) Parupalli Kashyap	7	5	2	+3
(India) Srikanth Kidambi	10	6	4	+2
(India) B. Sai Praneeth	5	5	0	+5
(India) Prannoy H. S.	13	7	6	+1
(India) Lakshya Sen	10	5	5	0

Player	Matches	Win	Lost	Diff.
(Indonesia) Anthony Sinisuka Ginting	15	6	9	–3
(Indonesia) Taufik Hidayat	3	1	2	–1
(Indonesia) Sony Dwi Kuncoro	4	4	0	+4
(Indonesia) Tommy Sugiarto	10	5	5	0
(Japan) Kento Momota	16	2	14	–12
(Japan) Kodai Naraoka	4	4	0	+4
(Japan) Sho Sasaki	4	3	1	+2
(Malaysia) Lee Chong Wei	7	0	7	–7
(Malaysia) Lee Zii Jia	11	5	6	–1
(Malaysia) Liew Daren	7	5	2	+3
(Singapore) Loh Kean Yew	9	5	4	+1
(South Korea) Heo Kwang-hee	3	2	1	+1
(South Korea) Lee Hyun-il	4	1	3	–2
(South Korea) Son Wan-ho	11	3	8	–5
(Thailand) Boonsak Ponsana	7	4	3	+1
(Thailand) Kunlavut Vitidsarn	7	5	2	+3
(Thailand) Kantaphon Wangcharoen	7	6	1	+5
(Vietnam) Nguyễn Tiến Minh	5	2	3	–1

== Personal life ==
After winning the 2024 Thailand Masters, Chou revealed that he had been diagnosed with early-stage colorectal cancer the previous year and underwent a colectomy.

Chou was baptized as a Christian in 2012.
