= 2023 BWF World Tour Finals =

2023 badminton tournament in Hangzhou, China

Tournament details
- Dates: 13–17 December
- Edition: 6th
- Level: World Tour Finals
- Total prize money: US$2,500,000
- Venue: Hangzhou Olympic Sports Expo Center
- Location: Xiacheng, Hangzhou, China

Champions
- Men's singles: (Denmark) Viktor Axelsen
- Women's singles: (Chinese Taipei) Tai Tzu-ying
- Men's doubles: (South Korea) Kang Min-hyuk (South Korea) Seo Seung-jae
- Women's doubles: (China) Chen Qingchen (China) Jia Yifan
- Mixed doubles: (China) Zheng Siwei (China) Huang Yaqiong

The 2023 BWF World Tour Finals (officially known as the HSBC BWF World Tour Finals 2023 for sponsorship reasons) was the final tournament of the 2023 BWF World Tour. It was held from 13 to 17 December 2023 in Hangzhou, China and had a total prize of $2,500,000.

== Tournament ==
The 2023 BWF World Tour was the sixth edition of the BWF World Tour Finals and was organized by the Chinese Badminton Association with sanction from the BWF.

=== Venue ===
This international tournament was held at the Hangzhou Olympic Sports Expo Center in Xiacheng, Hangzhou, China.

=== Point distribution ===
Below is the point distribution table for each phase of the tournament based on the BWF points system for the BWF World Tour Finals event.

Winner(s)	Runner(s)-up	Semi-finalists	3rd in group	4th in group
12,000	10,200	8,400	7,500	6,600

=== Prize money ===
The total prize money for this year's tournament is US$2,500,000. Distribution of prize money was in accordance with BWF regulations.

Achievement	Winner(s)	Runner(s)-up	Semi-finalist(s)	3rd in group	4th in group
Singles	$200,000	$100,000	$50,000	$27,500	$15,000
Doubles	$210,000	$100,000	$50,000	$32,500	$17,500

== Representatives ==
=== Eligible players ===
Below are the eligible players for World Tour Finals.

==== Men's singles ====
Seeds	Rank	NOCs	Players	Performances		
Seeds	Rank	NOCs	Players	Winner	Runner-up	Semifinalists
1	1	Japan (1)	Kodai Naraoka	1 Super 750: China Masters	1 Super 1000: Malaysia Open	4 Super 750: Singapore Open, Japan Open; Super 500: Canada Open, Korea Open
2	2	Indonesia (1)	Jonatan Christie	3 Super 750: French Open; Super 500: Indonesia Masters, Hong Kong Open	1 Super 750: Japan Open	2 Super 1000: China Open; Super 750: India Open
3/4	3	China (1)	Shi Yuqi		2 Super 1000: All England Open; Super 500: Japan Masters	5 Super 1000: China Open; Super 750: Denmark Open; Super 500: Indonesia Masters, Korea Open; Super 300: Thailand Masters
3/4	4	China (2)	Li Shifeng	2 Super 1000: All England Open; Super 300: U.S. Open	3 Super 750: French Open; Super 500: Canada Open; Super 300: German Open	2 Super 1000: Indonesia Open; Super 300: Thailand Masters
	5	Denmark (1)	Viktor Axelsen	5 Super 1000: Malaysia Open, Indonesia Open, China Open; Super 750: Japan Open; Super 500: Japan Masters	1 Super 750: India Open	1 Super 300: Swiss Open
	6	Indonesia (2)	Anthony Sinisuka Ginting	1 Super 750: Singapore Open	1 Super 1000: Indonesia Open	2 Super 750: India Open; Super 500: Hong Kong Open
	7	Denmark (2)	Anders Antonsen	1 Super 500: Korea Open	1 Super 500: Singapore Open	3 Super 1000: All England Open; Super 500: Arctic Open; Super 300: Spain Masters
	9	Thailand (1)	Kunlavut Vitidsarn	2 Super 750: India Open; Super 500: Thailand Open	1 Super 300: U.S. Open	2 Super 1000: Malaysia Open; Super 750: Singapore Open

==== Women's singles ====
Seeds	Rank	NOCs	Players	Performances		
Seeds	Rank	NOCs	Players	Winner	Runner-up	Semifinalists
1	1	South Korea (1)	An Se-young	8 Super 1000: All England Open, China Open; Super 750: India Open, Singapore Open, Japan Open; Super 500: Indonesia Masters, Thailand Open, Korea Open	2 Super 1000: Malaysia Open; Super 300: German Open	2 Super 1000: Indonesia Open; Super 500: Japan Masters
2	2	China (1)	Chen Yufei	4 Super 1000: Indonesia Open; Super 750: Denmark Open, French Open, China Masters	2 Super 1000: All England Open; Super 500: Japan Masters	5 Super 1000: Malaysia Open, China Open; Super 750: Singapore Open; Super 500: Korea Open; Super 300: German Open
3/4	4	Chinese Taipei (1)	Tai Tzu-ying	1 Super 300: Taipei Open	2 Super 750: French Open; Super 500: Korea Open	5 Super 1000: Malaysia Open, All England Open, China Open; Super 750: Singapore Open, Japan Open
3/4	5	Spain (1)	Carolina Marín	1 Super 300: Orléans Masters	3 Super 1000: Indonesia Open; Super 750: Denmark Open; Super 500: Indonesia Masters	2 Super 500: Thailand Open; Super 300: Spain Masters
	6	China (2)	Han Yue	1 Super 500: Arctic Open	2 Super 750: China Masters; Super 300: Thailand Masters	3 Super 750: Denmark Open; Super 500: Indonesia Masters, Malaysia Masters
	8	Indonesia (1)	Gregoria Mariska Tunjung	2 Super 500: Japan Masters; Super 300: Spain Masters	1 Super 500: Malaysia Masters	3 Super 750: Japan Open; Super 500: Hong Kong Open; Super 300: Swiss Open
	10	United States (1)	Beiwen Zhang	2 Super 500: Australian Open; Super 300: Hylo Open	2 Super 300: Orléans Masters, Taipei Open	2 Super 500: Canada Open; Super 300: Swiss Open
	11	South Korea (2)	Kim Ga-eun	1 Super 300: Korea Masters	1 Super 500: Australian Open	1 Super 750: China Masters

- Akane Yamaguchi, originally qualified for the Finals, withdrew due to an injury.

==== Men's doubles ====
Seeds	Rank	NOCs	Players	Performances		
Seeds	Rank	NOCs	Players	Winner	Runner-up	Semifinalists
1	1	China (1)	Liang Weikeng; Wang Chang	4 Super 1000: China Open; Super 750: India Open, China Masters; Super 500: Thailand Open	2 Super 1000: Malaysia Open; Super 750: Singapore Open	2 Super 1000: All England Open; Super 500: Korea Open
2	2	Indonesia (1)	Fajar Alfian; Muhammad Rian Ardianto	2 Super 1000: Malaysia Open, All England Open	1 Super 500: Korea Open	3 Super 750: India Open, Japan Open, Denmark Open
3/4	3	South Korea (1)	Kang Min-hyuk; Seo Seung-jae	2 Super 500: Malaysia Masters, Australian Open	1 Super 300: German Open	6 Super 1000: Malaysia Open, Indonesia Open, China Open; Super 750: India Open; Super 500: Korea Open; Super 300: Korea Masters
3/4	4	Malaysia (1)	Aaron Chia; Soh Wooi Yik	1 Super 750: Denmark Open	3 Super 1000: Indonesia Open, China Open; Super 750: India Open	1 Super 750: Singapore Open
	5	Japan (1)	Takuro Hoki; Yugo Kobayashi	1 Super 750: Singapore Openn	2 Super 750: Japan Open; Super 500: Australian Open	2 Super 1000: China Open; Super 500: Indonesia Masters
	6	Denmark (1)	Kim Astrup; Anders Skaarup Rasmussen	4 Super 750: French Open; Super 500: Canada Open, Hong Kong Open, Arctic Open		1 Super 750: Denmark Open
	7	China (2)	Liu Yuchen; Ou Xuanyi	1 Super 300: Hylo Open	1 Super 500: Japan Masters	3 Super 750: Japan Open, French Open; Super 500: Indonesia Masters
	8	Indonesia (2)	Muhammad Shohibul Fikri; Bagas Maulana		4 Super 750: Denmark Open, French Open; Super 500: Thailand Open; Super 300: Orléans Masters	1 Super 500: Thailand Masters

==== Women's doubles ====
Seeds	Rank	NOCs	Players	Performances		
Seeds	Rank	NOCs	Players	Winner	Runner-up	Semifinalists
1	1	China (1)	Chen Qingchen; Jia Yifan	5 Super 1000: Malaysia Open, China Open; Super 750: Singapore Open, Denmark Open; Super 500: Korea Open	2 Super 750: India Open, Japan Open	1 Super 750: China Masters
2	2	South Korea (1)	Baek Ha-na; Lee So-hee	3 Super 1000: Indonesia Open; Super 500: Malaysia Masters; Super 300: German Open	4 Super 1000: All England Open, China Open; Super 750: Singapore Open; Super 300: Thailand Masters	3 Super 500: Thailand Open; Super 300: Swiss Open, Spain Masters
3/4	3	Japan (1)	Mayu Matsumoto; Wakana Nagahara		1 Super 500: Canada Open	8 Super 1000: Indonesia Open; Super 750: Japan Open, Denmark Open, French Open; Super 500: Malaysia Masters, Korea Open, Arctic Open, Japan Masters
3/4	4	Japan (2)	Nami Matsuyama; Chiharu Shida	3 Super 750: India Open, China Masters; Super 500: Canada Open	2 Super 750: Denmark Open; Super 300: German Open	1 Super 1000: China Open
	5	China (2)	Liu Shengshu; Tan Ning	4 Super 750: French Open; Super 500: Arctic Open; Super 300: Spain Masters, U.S. Open	3 Super 500: Australian Open, Japan Masters; Super 300: Orléans Masters	1 Super 300: Hylo Open
	8	South Korea (2)	Kim So-yeong; Kong Hee-yong	3 Super 1000: All England Open; Super 750: Japan Open; Super 500: Australian Open	1 Super 500: Korea Open	1 Super 300: German Open
	9	Indonesia (1)	Apriyani Rahayu; Siti Fadia Silva Ramadhanti	1 Super 500: Hong Kong Open	1 Super 300: Hylo Open	3 Super 1000: Malaysia Open; Super 750: French Open; Super 300: Swiss Open
	11	Thailand (1)	Jongkolphan Kititharakul; Rawinda Prajongjai		2 Super 750: French Open; Super 500: Arctic Open	3 Super 500: Indonesia Masters, Thailand Open, Canada Open

==== Mixed doubles ====
Seeds	Rank	NOCs	Players	Performances		
Seeds	Rank	NOCs	Players	Winner	Runner-up	Semifinalists
1	1	China (1)	Feng Yanzhe; Huang Dongping	7 Super 750: Denmark Open; Super 500: Indonesia Masters, Korea Open, Australian Open, Arctic Open; Super 300: Thailand Masters, German Open	2 Super 500: Malaysia Masters, Japan Masters	3 Super 1000: Indonesia Open; Super 750: Japan Open, China Masters
2	2	China (2)	Zheng Siwei; Huang Yaqiong	5 Super 1000: Malaysia Open, All England Open, Indonesia Open; Super 750: China Masters; Super 500: Japan Masters	1 Super 750: Denmark Open	2 Super 750: India Open, Japan Open
3/4	3	South Korea (1)	Seo Seung-jae; Chae Yoo-jung	2 Super 1000: China Open; Super 300: Korea Masters	3 Super 1000: All England Open; Super 750: China Masters; Super 300: Thailand Masters	4 Super 750: Denmark Open; Super 500: Malaysia Masters, Australian Open, Japan Masters
3/4	4	Japan (1)	Yuta Watanabe; Arisa Higashino	2 Super 750: India Open, Japan Open	3 Super 1000: Malaysia Open, Indonesia Open; Super 750: Singapore Open	3 Super 750: French Open; Super 500: Korea Open, Japan Masters
	5	Thailand (1)	Dechapol Puavaranukroh; Sapsiree Taerattanachai	1 Super 500: Malaysia Masters	2 Super 750: Japan Open; Super 500: Thailand Open	2 Super 1000: Malaysia Open; Super 500: Korea Open
	7	South Korea (2)	Kim Won-ho; Jeong Na-eun	1 Super 500: Thailand Open	1 Super 300: German Open	5 Super 1000: All England Open; Super 750: India Open, Singapore Open, French Open; Super 300: Thailand Masters
	8	Hong Kong (1)	Tang Chun Man; Tse Ying Suet	1 Super 300: Hylo Open	2 Super 750: French Open; Super 500: Hong Kong Open	2 Super 1000: Indonesia Open; Super 750: China Masters
	9	Malaysia (1)	Chen Tang Jie; Toh Ee Wei	2 Super 300: Orléans Masters, Taipei Open		4 Super 1000: China Open; Super 750: Singapore Open; Super 500: Arctic Open; Super 300: Korea Masters

=== Representatives by nation ===
Top Nations
Rank	Nation	MS	WS	MD	WD	XD	Total	Players
1	China (H)	2	2	2	2	2	10	16
2	South Korea		2	1	2	2	7	12
3	Indonesia	2	1	2	1		6	9
4	Japan	1		1	2	1	5	9
5	Thailand	1			1	1	3	5
5	Denmark	2		1			3	4
7	Malaysia			1		1	2	4
8	Hong Kong					1	1	2
8	Chinese Taipei		1				1	1
8	Spain		1				1	1
8	United States		1				1	1
Total		8	8	8	8	8	40	64

== Performances by nation ==
Nation	Group stage	Semi-finals	Final	Winner(s)
China (H)	10	8	5	2
South Korea	7	4	2	1
Denmark	3	2	1	1
Chinese Taipei	1	1	1	1
Spain	1	1	1	
Indonesia	6	2		
Japan	5	2		
Thailand	3			
Malaysia	2			
Hong Kong	1			
United States	1			
Total	40	20	10	5

== Men's singles ==
=== Seeds ===
1. (Japan) Kodai Naraoka (group stage)
2. (Indonesia) Jonatan Christie (semi-finals)
3. (China) Shi Yuqi (final)
4. (China) Li Shifeng (group stage)

=== Group A ===
Rank	Players	Pld	W	L	GF	GA	GD	PF	PA	PD	Pts	Qualification
1	(China) Shi Yuqi	3	2	1	5	3	+2	149	146	+3	2	Advance to semi-finals
2	(Denmark) Viktor Axelsen	3	2	1	4	3	+1	138	109	+29	2	Advance to semi-finals
3	(Indonesia) Anthony Sinisuka Ginting	3	2	1	5	4	+1	146	152	–6	2	Eliminated
4	(Japan) Kodai Naraoka	3	0	3	2	6	−4	130	156	−26	0	Eliminated

Date	Player 1	Score	Player 2	Set 1	Set 2	Set 3
13 Dec	Kodai Naraoka (Japan)	1–2	(Indonesia) Anthony Sinisuka Ginting	21–10	10–21	18–21
13 Dec	Shi Yuqi (China)	2–0	(Denmark) Viktor Axelsen	21–19	21–19	
14 Dec	Shi Yuqi (China)	1–2	(Indonesia) Anthony Sinisuka Ginting	21–11	7–21	17–21
14 Dec	Kodai Naraoka (Japan)	0–2	(Denmark) Viktor Axelsen	17–21	9–21	
15 Dec	Kodai Naraoka (Japan)	1–2	(China) Shi Yuqi	21–18	21–23	13–21
15 Dec	Viktor Axelsen (Denmark)	2–1	(Indonesia) Anthony Sinisuka Ginting	16–21	21–7	21–13

=== Group B ===
Rank	Players	Pld	W	L	GF	GA	GD	PF	PA	PD	Pts	Qualification
1	(Denmark) Anders Antonsen	3	2	1	4	2	+2	118	99	+19	2	Advance to semi-finals
2	(Indonesia) Jonatan Christie	3	2	1	4	2	+2	115	102	+13	2	Advance to semi-finals
3	(China) Li Shifeng	3	2	1	4	2	+2	115	111	+4	2	Eliminated
4	(Thailand) Kunlavut Vitidsarn	3	0	3	0	6	−6	91	127	−36	0	Eliminated

Date	Player 1	Score	Player 2	Set 1	Set 2	Set 3
13 Dec	Li Shifeng (China)	0–2	(Denmark) Anders Antonsen	18–21	12–21	
13 Dec	Jonatan Christie (Indonesia)	2–0	(Thailand) Kunlavut Vitidsarn	21–18	21–8	
14 Dec	Li Shifeng (China)	2–0	(Thailand) Kunlavut Vitidsarn	21–18	22–20	
14 Dec	Jonatan Christie (Indonesia)	2–0	(Denmark) Anders Antonsen	21–16	21–18	
15 Dec	Anders Antonsen (Denmark)	2–0	(Thailand) Kunlavut Vitidsarn	21–16	21–11	
15 Dec	Jonatan Christie (Indonesia)	0–2	(China) Li Shifeng	13–21	18–21	

=== Finals ===
Semi-finals
A1	(China) Shi Yuqi	21	21
B2	(Indonesia) Jonatan Christie	16	15
A2	(Denmark) Viktor Axelsen	21	21
B1	(Denmark) Anders Antonsen	9	14

Final
A1	(China) Shi Yuqi	11	12
A2	(Denmark) Viktor Axelsen	21	21

== Women's singles ==
=== Seeds ===
1. (South Korea) An Se-young (semi-finals)
2. (China) Chen Yufei (semi-finals)
3. (Chinese Taipei) Tai Tzu-ying (champion)
4. (Spain) Carolina Marín (final)

=== Group A ===
Rank	Players	Pld	W	L	GF	GA	GD	PF	PA	PD	Pts	Qualification
1	(South Korea) An Se-young	3	2	1	4	2	+2	120	104	+16	2	Advance to semi-finals
2	(Chinese Taipei) Tai Tzu-ying	3	2	1	4	3	+1	137	126	+11	2	Advance to semi-finals
3	(Indonesia) Gregoria Mariska Tunjung	3	1	2	2	5	−3	127	137	−10	1	Eliminated
4	(South Korea) Kim Ga-eun	3	1	2	4	4	0	144	161	−17	1	Eliminated

Date	Player 1	Score	Player 2	Set 1	Set 2	Set 3
13 Dec	An Se-young (South Korea)	0–2	(South Korea) Kim Ga-eun	18–21	18–21	
13 Dec	Tai Tzu-ying (Chinese Taipei)	2–0	(Indonesia) Gregoria Mariska Tunjung	21–18	21–17	
14 Dec	An Se-young (South Korea)	2–0	(Indonesia) Gregoria Mariska Tunjung	21–14	21–16	
14 Dec	Tai Tzu-ying (Chinese Taipei)	2–1	(South Korea) Kim Ga-eun	21–15	21–23	21–11
15 Dec	An Se-young (South Korea)	2–0	(Chinese Taipei) Tai Tzu-ying	21–17	21–15	
15 Dec	Gregoria Mariska Tunjung (Indonesia)	2–1	(South Korea) Kim Ga-eun	21–14	20–22	21–17

=== Group B ===
Rank	Players	Pld	W	L	GF	GA	GD	PF	PA	PD	Pts	Qualification
1	(Spain) Carolina Marín	3	3	0	6	0	+6	133	96	+37	3	Advance to semi-finals
2	(China) Chen Yufei	3	2	1	4	3	+1	148	124	+24	2	Advance to semi-finals
3	(China) Han Yue	3	1	2	3	4	−1	113	139	−26	1	Eliminated
4	(United States) Beiwen Zhang	3	0	3	0	6	−6	92	127	−35	0	Eliminated

Date	Player 1	Score	Player 2	Set 1	Set 2	Set 3
13 Dec	Carolina Marín (Spain)	2–0	(United States) Beiwen Zhang	21–18	21–10	
13 Dec	Chen Yufei (China)	2–1	(China) Han Yue	21–17	19–21	21–9
14 Dec	Carolina Marín (Spain)	2–0	(China) Han Yue	21–11	21–12	
14 Dec	Chen Yufei (China)	2–0	(United States) Beiwen Zhang	21–13	21–15	
15 Dec	Han Yue (China)	2–0	(United States) Beiwen Zhang	22–20	21–16	
15 Dec	Chen Yufei (China)	0–2	(Spain) Carolina Marín	23–25	22–24	

=== Finals ===
Semi-finals
A1	(South Korea) An Se-young	21	15	20
A2	(Chinese Taipei) Tai Tzu-ying	19	21	22
B2	(China) Chen Yufei	17	21	13
B1	(Spain) Carolina Marín	21	19	21

Final
A2	(Chinese Taipei) Tai Tzu-ying	12	21	21
B1	(Spain) Carolina Marín	21	14	18

== Men's doubles ==
=== Seeds ===
1. (China) Liang Weikeng / Wang Chang (final)
2. (Indonesia) Fajar Alfian / Muhammad Rian Ardianto (semi-finals)
3. (South Korea) Kang Min-hyuk / Seo Seung-jae (champions)
4. (Malaysia) Aaron Chia / Soh Wooi Yik (group stage)

=== Group A ===
Rank	Players	Pld	W	L	GF	GA	GD	PF	PA	PD	Pts	Qualification
1	(China) Liu Yuchen (China) Ou Xuanyi	3	3	0	6	2	+4	162	143	+19	3	Advance to semi-finals
2	(China) Liang Weikeng (China) Wang Chang	3	2	1	5	3	+2	159	143	+16	2	Advance to semi-finals
3	(Japan) Takuro Hoki (Japan) Yugo Kobayashi	3	1	2	2	5	−3	123	141	−18	1	Eliminated
4	(Malaysia) Aaron Chia (Malaysia) Soh Wooi Yik	3	0	3	3	6	−3	161	178	−17	0	Eliminated

Date	Pair 1	Score	Pair 2	Set 1	Set 2	Set 3
13 Dec	Aaron Chia (Malaysia); Soh Wooi Yik (Malaysia)	1–2	(Japan) Takuro Hoki (Japan) Yugo Kobayashi	16–21	21–14	18–21
13 Dec	Liang Weikeng (China); Wang Chang (China)	1–2	(China) Liu Yuchen (China) Ou Xuanyi	18–21	21–16	16–21
14 Dec	Aaron Chia (Malaysia); Soh Wooi Yik (Malaysia)	1–2	(China) Liu Yuchen (China) Ou Xuanyi	21–19	18–21	20–22
14 Dec	Liang Weikeng (China); Wang Chang (China)	2–0	(Japan) Takuro Hoki (Japan) Yugo Kobayashi	23–21	21–17	
15 Dec	Liang Weikeng (China); Wang Chang (China)	2–1	(Malaysia) Aaron Chia (Malaysia) Soh Wooi Yik	18–21	21–14	21–12
15 Dec	Takuro Hoki (Japan); Yugo Kobayashi (Japan)	0–2	(China) Liu Yuchen (China) Ou Xuanyi	12–21	17–21	

=== Group B ===
Rank	Players	Pld	W	L	GF	GA	GD	PF	PA	PD	Pts	Qualification
1	(Indonesia) Fajar Alfian (Indonesia) Muhammad Rian Ardianto	3	2	1	5	2	+3	137	123	+14	2	Advance to semi-finals
2	(South Korea) Kang Min-hyuk (South Korea) Seo Seung-jae	3	2	1	5	3	+2	155	134	+21	2	Advance to semi-finals
3	(Denmark) Kim Astrup (Denmark) Anders Skaarup Rasmussen	3	2	1	4	3	+1	132	118	+14	2	Eliminated
4	(Indonesia) Muhammad Shohibul Fikri (Indonesia) Bagas Maulana	3	0	3	0	6	−6	77	126	−49	0	Eliminated

Date	Pair 1	Score	Pair 2	Set 1	Set 2	Set 3
13 Dec	Fajar Alfian (Indonesia); Muhammad Rian Ardianto (Indonesia)	2–0	(Indonesia) Muhammad Shohibul Fikri (Indonesia) Bagas Maulana	21–14	21–19	
13 Dec	Kang Min-hyuk (South Korea); Seo Seung-jae (South Korea)	1–2	(Denmark) Kim Astrup (Denmark) Anders Skaarup Rasmussen	10–21	21–15	22–24
14 Dec	Kang Min-hyuk (South Korea); Seo Seung-jae (South Korea)	2–0	(Indonesia) Muhammad Shohibul Fikri (Indonesia) Bagas Maulana	21–9	21–12	
14 Dec	Fajar Alfian (Indonesia); Muhammad Rian Ardianto (Indonesia)	2–0	(Denmark) Kim Astrup (Denmark) Anders Skaarup Rasmussen	21–12	21–18	
15 Dec	Fajar Alfian (Indonesia); Muhammad Rian Ardianto (Indonesia)	1–2	(South Korea) Kang Min-hyuk (South Korea) Seo Seung-jae	20–22	21–17	12–21
15 Dec	Kim Astrup (Denmark); Anders Skaarup Rasmussen (Denmark)	2–0	(Indonesia) Muhammad Shohibul Fikri (Indonesia) Bagas Maulana	21–17	21–6	

=== Finals ===
Semi-finals
A1	(China) Liu Yuchen (China) Ou Xuanyi	13	12
B2	(South Korea) Kang Min-hyuk (South Korea) Seo Seung-jae	21	21
A2	(China) Liang Weikeng (China) Wang Chang	22	12	21
B1	(Indonesia) Fajar Alfian (Indonesia) Muhammad Rian Ardianto	20	21	16

Final
B2	(South Korea) Kang Min-hyuk (South Korea) Seo Seung-jae	21	22
A2	(China) Liang Weikeng (China) Wang Chang	17	20

== Women's doubles ==
=== Seeds ===
1. (China) Chen Qingchen / Jia Yifan (champions)
2. (South Korea) Baek Ha-na / Lee So-hee (final)
3. (Japan) Mayu Matsumoto / Wakana Nagahara (withdraw)
4. (Japan) Nami Matsuyama / Chiharu Shida (semi-finals)

=== Group A ===
Rank	Players	Pld	W	L	GF	GA	GD	PF	PA	PD	Pts	Qualification
1	(China) Chen Qingchen (China) Jia Yifan	2	2	0	4	0	+4	84	55	+29	2	Advance to semi-finals
2	(China) Liu Shengshu (China) Tan Ning	2	1	1	2	2	0	73	63	+10	1	Advance to semi-finals
3	(Indonesia) Apriyani Rahayu (Indonesia) Siti Fadia Silva Ramadhanti	2	0	2	0	4	−4	45	84	−39	0	Eliminated
4	(Japan) Mayu Matsumoto (Japan) Wakana Nagahara (Z)	−	−	−	−	−	−	−	−	−	−	Withdraw

(Z) Withdrew after two matches.

Date	Pair 1	Score	Pair 2	Set 1	Set 2	Set 3
13 Dec	Chen Qingchen (China); Jia Yifan (China)	2–0	(China) Liu Shengshu (China) Tan Ning	21–14	21–17	
13 Dec	Mayu Matsumoto (Japan); Wakana Nagahara (Japan)	~~1–2~~ (voided)	(Indonesia) Apriyani Rahayu (Indonesia) Siti Fadia Silva Ramadhanti	~~21–11~~	~~16–21~~	~~18–21~~
14 Dec	Mayu Matsumoto (Japan); Wakana Nagahara (Japan)	~~1–1~~ (voided)	(China) Liu Shengshu (China) Tan Ning	~~21–19~~	~~11–21~~	~~0^{r}–0~~
14 Dec	Chen Qingchen (China); Jia Yifan (China)	2–0	(Indonesia) Apriyani Rahayu (Indonesia) Siti Fadia Silva Ramadhanti	21–10	21–14	
15 Dec	Liu Shengshu (China); Tan Ning (China)	2–0	(Indonesia) Apriyani Rahayu (Indonesia) Siti Fadia Silva Ramadhanti	21–13	21–8	
15 Dec	Chen Qingchen (China); Jia Yifan (China)	N/P	(Japan) Mayu Matsumoto (Japan) Wakana Nagahara	Cancelled		

=== Group B ===
Rank	Players	Pld	W	L	GF	GA	GD	PF	PA	PD	Pts	Qualification
1	(South Korea) Baek Ha-na (South Korea) Lee So-hee	3	3	0	6	1	+5	136	116	+20	3	Advance to semi-finals
2	(Japan) Nami Matsuyama (Japan) Chiharu Shida	3	2	1	5	2	+3	139	103	+36	2	Advance to semi-finals
3	(South Korea) Kim So-yeong (South Korea) Kong Hee-yong	3	1	2	2	4	−2	100	119	−19	1	Eliminated
4	(Thailand) Jongkolphan Kititharakul (Thailand) Rawinda Prajongjai	3	0	3	0	6	−6	89	126	−37	0	Eliminated

Date	Pair 1	Score	Pair 2	Set 1	Set 2	Set 3
13 Dec	Baek Ha-na (South Korea); Lee So-hee (South Korea)	2–0	(South Korea) Kim So-yeong (South Korea) Kong Hee-yong	21–11	22–20	
13 Dec	Nami Matsuyama (Japan); Chiharu Shida (Japan)	2–0	(Thailand) Jongkolphan Kititharakul (Thailand) Rawinda Prajongjai	21–15	21–10	
14 Dec	Baek Ha-na (South Korea); Lee So-hee (South Korea)	2–0	(Thailand) Jongkolphan Kititharakul (Thailand) Rawinda Prajongjai	21–15	21–15	
14 Dec	Nami Matsuyama (Japan); Chiharu Shida (Japan)	2–0	(South Korea) Kim So-yeong (South Korea) Kong Hee-yong	21–13	21–14	
15 Dec	Baek Ha-na (South Korea); Lee So-hee (South Korea)	2–1	(Japan) Nami Matsuyama (Japan) Chiharu Shida	21–18	9–21	21–16
15 Dec	Kim So-yeong (South Korea); Kong Hee-yong (South Korea)	2–0	(Thailand) Jongkolphan Kititharakul (Thailand) Rawinda Prajongjai	21–15	21–19	

=== Finals ===
Semi-finals
A1	(China) Chen Qingchen (China) Jia Yifan	21	21
A2	(China) Liu Shengshu (China) Tan Ning	12	15
B2	(Japan) Nami Matsuyama (Japan) Chiharu Shida	17	21	18
B1	(South Korea) Baek Ha-na (South Korea) Lee So-hee	21	18	21

Final
A1	(China) Chen Qingchen (China) Jia Yifan	21	21
B1	(South Korea) Baek Ha-na (South Korea) Lee So-hee	16	16

== Mixed doubles ==
=== Seeds ===
1. (China) Feng Yanzhe / Huang Dongping (final)
2. (China) Zheng Siwei / Huang Yaqiong (champions)
3. (South Korea) Seo Seung-jae / Chae Yoo-jung (semi-finals)
4. (Japan) Yuta Watanabe / Arisa Higashino (semi-finals)

=== Group A ===
Rank	Players	Pld	W	L	GF	GA	GD	PF	PA	PD	Pts	Qualification
1	(China) Feng Yanzhe (China) Huang Dongping	3	3	0	6	2	+4	157	128	+29	3	Advance to semi-finals
2	(Japan) Yuta Watanabe (Japan) Arisa Higashino	3	1	2	4	4	0	149	145	+4	1	Advance to semi-finals
3	(Thailand) Dechapol Puavaranukroh (Thailand) Sapsiree Taerattanachai	3	1	2	3	5	−2	141	149	−8	1	Eliminated
4	(Malaysia) Chen Tang Jie (Malaysia) Toh Ee Wei	3	1	2	3	5	−2	130	155	−25	1	Eliminated

Date	Pair 1	Score	Pair 2	Set 1	Set 2	Set 3
13 Dec	Yuta Watanabe (Japan); Arisa Higashino (Japan)	2–0	(Thailand) Dechapol Puavaranukroh (Thailand) Sapsiree Taerattanachai	21–16	21–14	
13 Dec	Feng Yanzhe (China); Huang Dongping (China)	2–0	(Malaysia) Chen Tang Jie (Malaysia) Toh Ee Wei	21–10	21–13	
14 Dec	Yuta Watanabe (Japan); Arisa Higashino (Japan)	1–2	(Malaysia) Chen Tang Jie (Malaysia) Toh Ee Wei	21–12	16–21	16–21
14 Dec	Feng Yanzhe (China); Huang Dongping (China)	2–1	(Thailand) Dechapol Puavaranukroh (Thailand) Sapsiree Taerattanachai	12–21	21–12	21–18
15 Dec	Dechapol Puavaranukroh (Thailand); Sapsiree Taerattanachai (Thailand)	2–1	(Malaysia) Chen Tang Jie (Malaysia) Toh Ee Wei	18–21	21–18	21–14
15 Dec	Feng Yanzhe (China); Huang Dongping (China)	2–1	(Japan) Yuta Watanabe (Japan) Arisa Higashino	21–16	19–21	21–17

=== Group B ===
Rank	Players	Pld	W	L	GF	GA	GD	PF	PA	PD	Pts	Qualification
1	(China) Zheng Siwei (China) Huang Yaqiong	3	3	0	6	1	+5	154	133	+21	3	Advance to semi-finals
2	(South Korea) Seo Seung-jae (South Korea) Chae Yoo-jung	3	2	1	4	3	+1	141	131	+10	2	Advance to semi-finals
3	(Hong Kong) Tang Chun Man (Hong Kong) Tse Ying Suet	3	1	2	3	5	−2	146	163	−17	1	Eliminated
4	(South Korea) Kim Won-ho (South Korea) Jeong Na-eun	3	0	3	2	6	−4	156	170	−14	0	Eliminated

Date	Pair 1	Score	Pair 2	Set 1	Set 2	Set 3
13 Dec	Zheng Siwei (China); Huang Yaqiong (China)	2–0	(Hong Kong) Tang Chun Man (Hong Kong) Tse Ying Suet	21–17	21–17	
13 Dec	Seo Seung-jae (South Korea); Chae Yoo-jung (South Korea)	2–0	(South Korea) Kim Won-ho (South Korea) Jeong Na-eun	23–21	21–12	
14 Dec	Zheng Siwei (China); Huang Yaqiong (China)	2–1	(South Korea) Kim Won-ho (South Korea) Jeong Na-eun	18–21	27–25	21–15
14 Dec	Seo Seung-jae (South Korea); Chae Yoo-jung (South Korea)	2–1	(Hong Kong) Tang Chun Man (Hong Kong) Tse Ying Suet	17–21	21–13	21–18
15 Dec	Zheng Siwei (China); Huang Yaqiong (China)	2–0	(South Korea) Seo Seung-jae (South Korea) Chae Yoo-jung	21–15	25–23	
15 Dec	Kim Won-ho (South Korea); Jeong Na-eun (South Korea)	1–2	(Hong Kong) Tang Chun Man (Hong Kong) Tse Ying Suet	23–25	21–14	18–21

=== Finals ===
Semi-finals
A1	(China) Feng Yanzhe (China) Huang Dongping	21	23
A2	(Japan) Yuta Watanabe (Japan) Arisa Higashino	19	21
B2	(South Korea) Seo Seung-jae (South Korea) Chae Yoo-jung	12	5
B1	(China) Zheng Siwei (China) Huang Yaqiong	21	21

Final
A1	(China) Feng Yanzhe (China) Huang Dongping	11	18
B1	(China) Zheng Siwei (China) Huang Yaqiong	21	21

Preceded by 2023 Guwahati Masters	BWF World Tour; 2023 BWF season	Succeeded by 2024 Malaysia Open
