= 2023 Malaysia Open (badminton) =

Badminton tournament in Malaysia

Tournament details
- Dates: 10–15 January
- Level: Super 1000
- Total prize money: US$1,250,000
- Venue: Axiata Arena
- Location: Kuala Lumpur, Malaysia

Champions
- Men's singles: (Denmark) Viktor Axelsen
- Women's singles: (Japan) Akane Yamaguchi
- Men's doubles: (Indonesia) Fajar Alfian (Indonesia) Muhammad Rian Ardianto
- Women's doubles: (China) Chen Qingchen (China) Jia Yifan
- Mixed doubles: (China) Zheng Siwei (China) Huang Yaqiong

The 2023 Malaysia Open (officially known as the Petronas Malaysia Open 2023 for sponsorship reasons) was a badminton tournament that took place at the Axiata Arena, Kuala Lumpur, Malaysia, from 10 to 15 January 2023 and had a total prize of US$1,250,000. This was the first Malaysia Open to hold a Super 1000 status.

== Tournament ==
The 2023 Malaysia Open was the first tournament of the 2023 BWF World Tour and was part of the Malaysia Open championships, which had been held since 1937. This tournament was organized by the Badminton Association of Malaysia with sanction from the BWF.

=== Venue ===
This tournament was held at the Axiata Arena inside the KL Sports City in Kuala Lumpur, Malaysia.

=== Point distribution ===
Below is the point distribution table for each phase of the tournament based on the BWF points system for the BWF World Tour Super 1000 event.

Winner	Runner-up	3/4	5/8	9/16	17/32
12,000	10,200	8,400	6,600	4,800	3,000

=== Prize pool ===
The total prize money was US$1,250,000 with the distribution of the prize money in accordance with BWF regulations.

Event	Winner	Finalist	Semi-finals	Quarter-finals	Last 16	Last 32
Singles	$87,500	$42,500	$17,500	$6,875	$3,750	$1,250
Doubles	$92,500	$43,750	$17,500	$7,812.50	$4,062.50	$1,250

== Men's singles ==
=== Seeds ===
1. (Denmark) Viktor Axelsen (champion)
2. (Malaysia) Lee Zii Jia (first round)
3. (Singapore) Loh Kean Yew (quarter-finals)
4. (Chinese Taipei) Chou Tien-chen (second round)
5. (Indonesia) Jonatan Christie (second round)
6. (Indonesia) Anthony Sinisuka Ginting (quarter-finals)
7. (India) Lakshya Sen (first round)
8. (Thailand) Kunlavut Vitidsarn (semi-finals)

=== Finals ===
Semi-finals
1	(Denmark) Viktor Axelsen	21	21
(Japan) Kanta Tsuneyama	7	15
8	(Thailand) Kunlavut Vitidsarn	17	21	17
(Japan) Kodai Naraoka	21	19	21

Final
1	(Denmark) Viktor Axelsen	21	21
(Japan) Kodai Naraoka	6	15

=== Top half ===
==== Section 1 ====
First round
1	(Denmark) V Axelsen	17	21	21
(Denmark) R Gemke	21	14	12
(France) T J Popov	15	21	17
PFR	(Malaysia) Liew D	21	14	21
5	(Indonesia) J Christie	21	21
(Chinese Taipei) Wang T-w	19	13
(Japan) K Nishimoto	21	21
(India) S Kidambi	19	14

Second round
1	(Denmark) V Axelsen	w	/	o
PFR	(Malaysia) Liew D
5	(Indonesia) J Christie	15	17
(Japan) K Nishimoto	21	21

Quarter-finals
1	(Denmark) V Axelsen	21	21
(Japan) K Nishimoto	6	12

==== Section 2 ====
First round
4	(Chinese Taipei) Chou T-c	21	24	21
(China) Shi YQ	23	22	18
(Japan) K Tsuneyama	3	21	23
(Hong Kong) Lee C Y	21	5	21
6	(Indonesia) A S Ginting	17	21	21
(Hong Kong) Ng K L	21	18	12
(Denmark) A Antonsen	8	22	21
(China) Weng HY	21	20	19

Second round
4	(Chinese Taipei) Chou T-c	21	19
(Japan) K Tsuneyama	23	21
6	(Indonesia) A S Ginting	21	17	21
(Denmark) A Antonsen	14	21	17

Quarter-finals
(Japan) K Tsuneyama	21	21
6	(Indonesia) A S Ginting	14	16

=== Bottom half ===
==== Section 3 ====
First round
(Canada) B Yang	16	21	13
(Thailand) K Wangcharoen	21	17	21
(Indonesia) S H Rhustavito	23	19	22
8	(Thailand) K Vitidsarn	21	21	24
(China) Lu GZ	17	16
(China) Zhao JP	21	21
(China) Li SF	19	21
3	(Singapore) Loh K Y	21	23

Second round
(Thailand) K Wangcharoen	14	17
8	(Thailand) K Vitidsarn	21	21
(China) Zhao JP	8	15
3	(Singapore) Loh K Y	21	21

Quarter-finals
8	(Thailand) K Vitidsarn	21	20	21
3	(Singapore) Loh K Y	11	22	14

==== Section 4 ====
First round
(Denmark) H-K Vittinghus	11	21	23
(Indonesia) C A Dwi Wardoyo	21	16	25
(India) Prannoy H. S.	22	21	21
7	(India) L Sen	24	12	18
(Malaysia) Ng T Y	21	21
(Republic of Ireland) N Nguyen	4	10
(Japan) K Naraoka	13	21	21
2	(Malaysia) Lee Z J	21	17	19

Second round
(Indonesia) C A Dwi Wardoyo	9	21	16
(India) Prannoy H. S.	21	15	21
(Malaysia) Ng T Y	21	19	15
(Japan) K Naraoka	15	21	21

Quarter-finals
(India) Prannoy H. S.	16	21	10
(Japan) K Naraoka	21	19	21

== Women's singles ==
=== Seeds ===
1. (Japan) Akane Yamaguchi (champion)
2. (South Korea) An Se-young (final)
3. (Chinese Taipei) Tai Tzu-ying (semi-finals)
4. (China) Chen Yufei (semi-finals)
5. (China) He Bingjiao (first round)
6. (India) P. V. Sindhu (first round)
7. (Thailand) Ratchanok Intanon (withdrew)
8. (China) Wang Zhiyi (quarter-finals)

=== Finals ===
Semi-finals
1	(Japan) Akane Yamaguchi	21	21
3	(Chinese Taipei) Tai Tzu-ying	18	16
4	(China) Chen Yufei	12	21	9
2	(South Korea) An Se-young	21	19	21

Final
1	(Japan) Akane Yamaguchi	12	21	21
2	(South Korea) An Se-young	21	19	11

=== Top half ===
==== Section 1 ====
First round
1	(Japan) A Yamaguchi	17	21	21
(Denmark) L Kjærsfeldt	21	13	15
(Thailand) B Ongbamrungphan	21	21
(Scotland) K Gilmour	17	8
PFR	(South Korea) Sim Y-j	9	21	14
(Japan) A Ohori	21	14	21
(Denmark) M Blichfeldt	21	21
(South Korea) Kim G-e	19	7

Second round
1	(Japan) A Yamaguchi	21	21
(Thailand) B Ongbamrungphan	15	15
(Japan) A Ohori	17	21	14
(Denmark) M Blichfeldt	21	19	21

Quarter-finals
1	(Japan) A Yamaguchi	21	21
(Denmark) M Blichfeldt	12	11

==== Section 2 ====
First round
3	(Chinese Taipei) Tai T-y	21	21
(Spain) C Azurmendi	10	10
(India) S Nehwal	12	21	12
(China) Han Y	21	17	21
5	(China) He BJ	11	17
(Indonesia) G M Tunjung	21	21
(India) A Kashyap	10	8
(Chinese Taipei) Hsu W-c	21	21

Second round
3	(Chinese Taipei) Tai T-y	21	21
(China) Han Y	10	13
(Indonesia) G M Tunjung	18	21	18
(Chinese Taipei) Hsu W-c	21	16	21

Quarter-finals
3	(Chinese Taipei) Tai T-y	21	21
(Chinese Taipei) Hsu W-c	6	8

=== Bottom half ===
==== Section 3 ====
First round
(Thailand) P Chochuwong	21	21
(Singapore) Yeo J M	15	16
(Spain) C Marín	21	10	21
6	(India) P. V. Sindhu	12	21	15
(Canada) M Li	21	21
(Denmark) L Christophersen	13	15
(Japan) N Okuhara	9	17
4	(China) Chen YF	21	21

Second round
(Thailand) P Chochuwong	14	17
(Spain) C Marín	21	21
(Canada) M Li	13	21	13
4	(China) Chen YF	21	10	21

Quarter-finals
(Spain) C Marín	18	19
4	(China) Chen YF	21	21

==== Section 4 ====
First round
(Chinese Taipei) Pai Y-p	21	24
(United States) BW Zhang	18	22
(China) Zhang YM	16	10
8	(China) Wang ZY	21	21
PFR	(Malaysia) Goh J W	21	21
(Germany) Y Li	11	18
(India) M Bansod	9	13
2	(South Korea) An S-y	21	21

Second round
(Chinese Taipei) Pai Y-p	13	10
8	(China) Wang ZY	21	21
PFR	(Malaysia) Goh J W	10	12
2	(South Korea) An S-y	21	21

Quarter-finals
8	(China) Wang ZY	17	21	19
2	(South Korea) An S-y	21	16	21

== Men's doubles ==
=== Seeds ===
1. (Japan) Takuro Hoki / Yugo Kobayashi (first round)
2. (Indonesia) Marcus Fernaldi Gideon / Kevin Sanjaya Sukamuljo (second round)
3. (Indonesia) Fajar Alfian / Muhammad Rian Ardianto (champions)
4. (Malaysia) Aaron Chia / Soh Wooi Yik (second round)
5. (Indonesia) Mohammad Ahsan / Hendra Setiawan (quarter-finals)
6. (Denmark) Kim Astrup / Anders Skaarup Rasmussen (quarter-finals)
7. (India) Satwiksairaj Rankireddy / Chirag Shetty (semi-finals)
8. (Malaysia) Ong Yew Sin / Teo Ee Yi (quarter-finals)

=== Finals ===
Semi-finals
(South Korea) Kang Min-hyuk (South Korea) Seo Seung-jae	18	17
3	(Indonesia) Fajar Alfian (Indonesia) Muhammad Rian Ardianto	21	21
7	(India) Satwiksairaj Rankireddy (India) Chirag Shetty	16	21	15
(China) Liang Weikeng (China) Wang Chang	21	11	21

Final
3	(Indonesia) Fajar Alfian (Indonesia) Muhammad Rian Ardianto	21	18	21
(China) Liang Weikeng (China) Wang Chang	18	21	13

=== Top half ===
==== Section 1 ====
First round
1	(Japan) T Hoki (Japan) Y Kobayashi	13	15
(Chinese Taipei) Lee Y (Chinese Taipei) Wang C-l	21	21
(South Korea) Kang M-h (South Korea) Seo S-j	21	21
PFR	(India) K P Garaga (India) V G Panjala	10	18
5	(Indonesia) M Ahsan (Indonesia) H Setiawan	19	21	21
(China) He JT (China) Zhou HD	21	8	13
(Indonesia) P Kusumawardana (Indonesia) Y Rambitan	21	21
(South Korea) Ko S-h (South Korea) Shin B-c	12	17

Second round
(Chinese Taipei) Lee Y (Chinese Taipei) Wang C-l	18	17
(South Korea) Kang M-h (South Korea) Seo S-j	21	21
5	(Indonesia) M Ahsan (Indonesia) H Setiawan	21	21
(Indonesia) P Kusumawardana (Indonesia) Y Rambitan	19	17

Quarter-finals
(South Korea) Kang M-h (South Korea) Seo S-j	21	19	21
5	(Indonesia) M Ahsan (Indonesia) H Setiawan	13	21	11

==== Section 2 ====
First round
3	(Indonesia) F Alfian (Indonesia) M R Ardianto	19	21	21
(France) C Popov (France) T J Popov	21	16	15
(Netherlands) R Jille (Netherlands) T van der Lecq	19	7
(Germany) M Lamsfuß (Germany) M Seidel	21	21
8	(Malaysia) Ong Y S (Malaysia) Teo E Y	21	20	21
(China) Ren XY (China) Tan Q	13	22	15
(Scotland) A Dunn (Scotland) A Hall	14	11
(Chinese Taipei) Lu C-y (Chinese Taipei) Yang P-ha	21	21

Second round
3	(Indonesia) F Alfian (Indonesia) M R Ardianto	8	21	21
(Germany) M Lamsfuß (Germany) M Seidel	21	19	16
8	(Malaysia) Ong Y S (Malaysia) Teo E Y	17	21	21
(Chinese Taipei) Lu C-y (Chinese Taipei) Yang P-ha	21	12	14

Quarter-finals
3	(Indonesia) F Alfian (Indonesia) M R Ardianto	14	21	21
8	(Malaysia) Ong Y S (Malaysia) Teo E Y	21	16	17

=== Bottom half ===
==== Section 3 ====
First round
(Thailand) S Jomkoh (Thailand) K Kedren	21	16	19
(Indonesia) M S Fikri (Indonesia) B Maulana	16	21	21
(South Korea) Choi S-g (South Korea) Kim W-h	16	13
7	(India) S Rankireddy (India) C Shetty	21	21
(China) Liu YC (China) Ou XY	21	24
(England) B Lane (England) S Vendy	19	22
(Chinese Taipei) Lee J-h (Chinese Taipei) Yang P-hs	21	15	16
4	(Malaysia) A Chia (Malaysia) Soh W Y	16	21	21

Second round
(Indonesia) M S Fikri (Indonesia) B Maulana	19	20
7	(India) S Rankireddy (India) C Shetty	21	22
(China) Liu YC (China) Ou XY	21	23
4	(Malaysia) A Chia (Malaysia) Soh W Y	10	21

Quarter-finals
7	(India) S Rankireddy (India) C Shetty	17	22	21
(China) Liu YC (China) Ou XY	21	20	9

==== Section 4 ====
First round
(Indonesia) L R Carnando (Indonesia) D Marthin	21	21
(Japan) A Koga (Japan) T Saito	14	18
(Japan) K Matsui (Japan) Y Takeuchi	13	10
6	(Denmark) K Astrup (Denmark) A S Rasmussen	21	21
(Malaysia) Goh S F (Malaysia) N Izzuddin	21	11	17
(China) Liang WK (China) Wang C	16	21	21
(Malaysia) Man W C (Malaysia) Tee K W	18	21
2	(Indonesia) M F Gideon (Indonesia) K S Sukamuljo	21	23

Second round
(Indonesia) L R Carnando (Indonesia) D Marthin	13	9
6	(Denmark) K Astrup (Denmark) A S Rasmussen	21	21
(China) Liang WK (China) Wang C	20	21	21
2	(Indonesia) M F Gideon (Indonesia) K S Sukamuljo	22	12	19

Quarter-finals
6	(Denmark) K Astrup (Denmark) A S Rasmussen	20	21
(China) Liang WK (China) Wang C	22	23

== Women's doubles ==
=== Seeds ===
1. (China) Chen Qingchen / Jia Yifan (champions)
2. (Japan) Nami Matsuyama / Chiharu Shida (withdrew)
3. (South Korea) Kim So-yeong / Kong Hee-yong (quarter-finals)
4. (South Korea) Lee So-hee / Shin Seung-chan (first round)
5. (South Korea) Jeong Na-eun / Kim Hye-jeong (second round)
6. (Thailand) Jongkolphan Kititharakul / Rawinda Prajongjai (first round)
7. (China) Zhang Shuxian / Zheng Yu (semi-finals)
8. (Malaysia) Pearly Tan / Thinaah Muralitharan (first round)

=== Finals ===
Semi-finals
1	(China) Chen Qingchen (China) Jia Yifan	21	2
(Indonesia) Apriyani Rahayu (Indonesia) Siti Fadia Silva Ramadhanti	9	0^{r}
7	(China) Zhang Shuxian (China) Zheng Yu	17	21
(South Korea) Baek Ha-na (South Korea) Lee Yu-lim	21	23

Final
1	(China) Chen Qingchen (China) Jia Yifan	21	21
(South Korea) Baek Ha-na (South Korea) Lee Yu-lim	16	10

=== Top half ===
==== Section 1 ====
First round
1	(China) Chen QC (China) Jia YF	21	21
(Netherlands) D Jille (Netherlands) C Seinen	11	14
(France) M Lambert (France) A Tran	16	15
(Indonesia) F D Kusuma (Indonesia) A C Pratiwi	21	21
8	(Malaysia) P Tan (Malaysia) Thinaah M	19	14
(Bulgaria) G Stoeva (Bulgaria) S Stoeva	21	21
(India) T Jolly (India) G Gopichand	21	21
(Hong Kong) Yeung N T (Hong Kong) Yeung P L	19	14

Second round
1	(China) Chen QC (China) Jia YF	21	21
(Indonesia) F D Kusuma (Indonesia) A C Pratiwi	7	9
(Bulgaria) G Stoeva (Bulgaria) S Stoeva	21	15	21
(India) T Jolly (India) G Gopichand	13	21	17

Quarter-finals
1	(China) Chen QC (China) Jia YF	21	21
(Bulgaria) G Stoeva (Bulgaria) S Stoeva	17	17

==== Section 2 ====
First round
3	(South Korea) Kim S-y (South Korea) Kong H-y	21	16	21
(Japan) R Iwanaga (Japan) K Nakanishi	15	21	15
(Germany) L Efler (Germany) I Lohau	16	15
(Thailand) B Aimsaard (Thailand) N Aimsaard	21	21
5	(South Korea) Jeong N-e (South Korea) Kim H-j	21	21
(England) C Birch (England) L Smith	16	11
(Indonesia) A Rahayu (Indonesia) S F S Ramadhanti	21	21
(Chinese Taipei) Lee C-h (Chinese Taipei) Teng C-h	16	15

Second round
3	(South Korea) Kim S-y (South Korea) Kong H-y	21	23
(Thailand) B Aimsaard (Thailand) N Aimsaard	17	21
5	(South Korea) Jeong N-e (South Korea) Kim H-j	16	21	15
(Indonesia) A Rahayu (Indonesia) S F S Ramadhanti	21	13	21

Quarter-finals
3	(South Korea) Kim S-y (South Korea) Kong H-y	20	15
(Indonesia) A Rahayu (Indonesia) S F S Ramadhanti	22	21

=== Bottom half ===
==== Section 3 ====
First round
PFR	(Malaysia) Go P K (Malaysia) Teoh M X	21	21
(Malaysia) V Hoo (Malaysia) Lim C S	13	13
(Japan) Y Fukushima (Japan) S Hirota	15	21	16
7	(China) Zhang SX (China) Zheng Y	21	19	21
(China) Li WM (China) Liu XX	21	21
PFR	(Hong Kong) Ng T Y (Hong Kong) Tsang H Y	7	11
(China) Du Y (China) Xia YT	21	22
4	(South Korea) Lee S-h (South Korea) Shin S-c	19	20

Second round
PFR	(Malaysia) Go P K (Malaysia) Teoh M X	10	7
7	(China) Zhang SX (China) Zheng Y	21	21
(China) Li WM (China) Liu XX	21	17	21
(China) Du Y (China) Xia YT	12	21	14

Quarter-finals
7	(China) Zhang SX (China) Zheng Y	21	21
(China) Li WM (China) Liu XX	19	19

==== Section 4 ====
First round
(United States) S Gurazada (United States) I Jaiswal	21	18	21
(Spain) C Azurmendi (Spain) B Corrales	17	21	16
(South Korea) Baek H-n (South Korea) Lee Y-l	21	17	21
6	(Thailand) J Kititharakul (Thailand) R Prajongjai	15	21	16
(India) A Bhat (India) S Gautam	10	12
(Thailand) S Paewsampran (Thailand) P Supajirakul	21	21
(Scotland) J MacPherson (Scotland) C Torrance	22	14	19
PFR	(Singapore) Jin YJ (Singapore) C Wong	20	21	21

Second round
(United States) S Gurazada (United States) I Jaiswal	2	6
(South Korea) Baek H-n (South Korea) Lee Y-l	21	21
(Thailand) S Paewsampran (Thailand) P Supajirakul	18	23
PFR	(Singapore) Jin YJ (Singapore) C Wong	21	25

Quarter-finals
(South Korea) Baek H-n (South Korea) Lee Y-l	21	21
PFR	(Singapore) Jin YJ (Singapore) C Wong	10	6

== Mixed doubles ==
=== Seeds ===
1. (China) Zheng Siwei / Huang Yaqiong (champions)
2. (Thailand) Dechapol Puavaranukroh / Sapsiree Taerattanachai (semi-finals)
3. (Japan) Yuta Watanabe / Arisa Higashino (final)
4. (China) Wang Yilyu / Huang Dongping (second round)
5. (Hong Kong) Tang Chun Man / Tse Ying Suet (second round)
6. (Malaysia) Tan Kian Meng / Lai Pei Jing (first round)
7. (South Korea) Seo Seung-jae / Chae Yoo-jung (quarter-finals)
8. (France) Thom Gicquel / Delphine Delrue (quarter-finals)

=== Finals ===
Semi-finals
1	(China) Zheng Siwei (China) Huang Yaqiong	21	21
(Indonesia) Dejan Ferdinansyah (Indonesia) Gloria Emanuelle Widjaja	16	18
3	(Japan) Yuta Watanabe (Japan) Arisa Higashino	21	21
2	(Thailand) Dechapol Puavaranukroh (Thailand) Sapsiree Taerattanachai	18	15

Final
1	(China) Zheng Siwei (China) Huang Yaqiong	21	21
3	(Japan) Yuta Watanabe (Japan) Arisa Higashino	19	11

=== Top half ===
==== Section 1 ====
First round
1	(China) Zheng SW (China) Huang YQ	21	21
(Chinese Taipei) Yang P-hs (Chinese Taipei) Hu L-f	8	14
(Malaysia) Goh S H (Malaysia) S J Lai	21	21
(Chinese Taipei) Chang K-c (Chinese Taipei) Lee C-c	15	13
8	(France) T Gicquel (France) D Delrue	21	21
(Indonesia) R Rivaldy (Indonesia) P H Mentari	18	18
(Malaysia) Hoo P R (Malaysia) Teoh M X	21	15	21
(Japan) K Yamashita (Japan) N Shinoya	11	21	19

Second round
1	(China) Zheng SW (China) Huang YQ	21	21
(Malaysia) Goh S H (Malaysia) S J Lai	16	10
8	(France) T Gicquel (France) D Delrue	21	13	21
(Malaysia) Hoo P R (Malaysia) Teoh M X	18	21	12

Quarter-finals
1	(China) Zheng SW (China) Huang YQ	21	21
8	(France) T Gicquel (France) D Delrue	15	6

==== Section 2 ====
First round
4	(China) Wang YL (China) Huang DP	21	23
(Germany) M Lamsfuß (Germany) I Lohau	17	21
(Denmark) M Christiansen (Denmark) A Bøje	20	19
(South Korea) Kim W-h (South Korea) Jeong N-e	22	21
5	(Hong Kong) Tang C M (Hong Kong) Tse Y S	21	19	21
(Scotland) A Hall (Scotland) J MacPherson	18	21	19
(Netherlands) R Tabeling (Netherlands) S Piek	16	14
(Indonesia) D Ferdinansyah (Indonesia) G E Widjaja	21	21

Second round
4	(China) Wang YL (China) Huang DP	21	20	21
(South Korea) Kim W-h (South Korea) Jeong N-e	12	22	23
5	(Hong Kong) Tang C M (Hong Kong) Tse Y S	17	16
(Indonesia) D Ferdinansyah (Indonesia) G E Widjaja	21	21

Quarter-finals
(South Korea) Kim W-h (South Korea) Jeong N-e	16	19
(Indonesia) D Ferdinansyah (Indonesia) G E Widjaja	21	21

=== Bottom half ===
==== Section 3 ====
First round
(Chinese Taipei) Lee J-h (Chinese Taipei) Hsu Y-c	19	21
(Chinese Taipei) Ye H-w (Chinese Taipei) Lee C-h	21	23
(Hong Kong) Lee C H (Hong Kong) Ng T Y	17	24
7	(South Korea) Seo S-j (South Korea) Chae Y-j	21	26
(Japan) Y Kaneko (Japan) M Matsutomo	21	21
(Indonesia) Z J Sumanti (Indonesia) H Julimarbela	17	18
PFR	(England) G Mairs (England) J Moore	9	16
3	(Japan) Y Watanabe (Japan) A Higashino	21	21

Second round
(Chinese Taipei) Ye H-w (Chinese Taipei) Lee C-h	13	15
7	(South Korea) Seo S-j (South Korea) Chae Y-j	21	21
(Japan) Y Kaneko (Japan) M Matsutomo	17	13
3	(Japan) Y Watanabe (Japan) A Higashino	21	21

Quarter-finals
7	(South Korea) Seo S-j (South Korea) Chae Y-j	17	17
3	(Japan) Y Watanabe (Japan) A Higashino	21	21

==== Section 4 ====
First round
(Indonesia) R N Kusharjanto (Indonesia) L A Kusumawati	18	21	21
(Malaysia) Chan P S (Malaysia) Goh L Y	21	15	7
(Malaysia) Chen T J (Malaysia) Toh E W	21	21
6	(Malaysia) Tan K M (Malaysia) Lai P J	15	10
(Germany) J R Jansen (Germany) L Efler	16	10
(Singapore) T Hee (Singapore) J Tan	21	21
(Thailand) S Jomkoh (Thailand) S Paewsampran	14	14
2	(Thailand) D Puavaranukroh (Thailand) S Taerattanachai	21	21

Second round
(Indonesia) R N Kusharjanto (Indonesia) L A Kusumawati	19	16
(Malaysia) Chen T J (Malaysia) Toh E W	21	21
(Singapore) T Hee (Singapore) J Tan	12	13
2	(Thailand) D Puavaranukroh (Thailand) S Taerattanachai	21	21

Quarter-finals
(Malaysia) Chen T J (Malaysia) Toh E W	19	9
2	(Thailand) D Puavaranukroh (Thailand) S Taerattanachai	21	21

Preceded by 2022 BWF World Tour Finals	BWF World Tour; 2023 BWF season	Succeeded by 2023 India Open
