= 2023 All England Open =

Badminton tournament in Birmingham

Tournament details
- Dates: 14–19 March
- Edition: 113th
- Level: Super 1000
- Total prize money: US$1,250,000
- Venue: Utilita Arena Birmingham
- Location: Birmingham, England

Champions
- Men's singles: (China) Li Shifeng
- Women's singles: (South Korea) An Se-young
- Men's doubles: (Indonesia) Fajar Alfian (Indonesia) Muhammad Rian Ardianto
- Women's doubles: (South Korea) Kim So-yeong (South Korea) Kong Hee-yong
- Mixed doubles: (China) Zheng Siwei (China) Huang Yaqiong

The 2023 All England Open (officially known as the Yonex All England Open Badminton Championships 2023 for sponsorship reasons) was a badminton tournament which took place at the Utilita Arena Birmingham in Birmingham, England, from 14 to 19 March 2023 and had a total prize pool of $1,250,000.

== Tournament ==
The 2023 All England Open was the sixth tournament of the 2023 BWF World Tour and was part of the All England Open championships, which has been held since 1899. The tournament was organized by the Badminton England and sanction from the Badminton World Federation.

=== Venue ===
This tournament was held at the Utilita Arena Birmingham in Birmingham, England.

=== Point distribution ===
Below is the point distribution table for each phase of the tournament based on the BWF points system for the BWF World Tour Super 1000 event.

Winner	Runner-up	3/4	5/8	9/16	17/32
12,000	10,200	8,400	6,600	4,800	3,000

=== Prize pool ===
The total prize money for this tournament was US$1,250,000. The distribution of the prize money was in accordance with BWF regulations.

Event	Winner	Finalist	Semi-finals	Quarter-finals	Last 16	Last 32
Singles	$87,500	$42,500	$17,500	$6,875	$3,750	$1,250
Doubles	$92,500	$43,750	$17,500	$7,812.50	$4,062.50	$1,250

== Men's singles ==
=== Seeds ===
1. (Denmark) Viktor Axelsen (second round)
2. (Indonesia) Jonatan Christie (first round)
3. (Indonesia) Anthony Sinisuka Ginting (quarter-finals)
4. (Malaysia) Lee Zii Jia (semi-finals)
5. (Chinese Taipei) Chou Tien-chen (first round)
6. (Thailand) Kunlavut Vitidsarn (second round)
7. (Japan) Kodai Naraoka (quarter-finals)
8. (Singapore) Loh Kean Yew (first round)

=== Finals ===
Semi-finals
(China) Li Shifeng	21	19	21
(Denmark) Anders Antonsen	11	21	18
4	(Malaysia) Lee Zii Jia	19	13
(China) Shi Yuqi	21	21

Final
(China) Li Shifeng	26	21
(China) Shi Yuqi	24	5

=== Top half ===
==== Section 1 ====
First round
1	(Denmark) V Axelsen	19	21	21
(Hong Kong) Lee C Y	21	15	11
(Indonesia) S H Rhustavito	9	12
(Malaysia) Ng T Y	21	21
8	(Singapore) Loh K Y	16	21	7
(China) Zhao JP	21	16	21
(China) Li SF	21	8
(Hong Kong) Ng K L	12	1^{r}

Second round
1	(Denmark) V Axelsen	15	21	21
(Malaysia) Ng T Y	21	9	23
(China) Zhao JP	9	17
(China) Li SF	21	21

Quarter-finals
(Malaysia) Ng T Y	11	11
(China) Li SF	21	21

==== Section 2 ====
First round
3	(Indonesia) A S Ginting	21	21
(Thailand) K Wangcharoen	17	19
(Chinese Taipei) Wang T-w	19	20
(India) Prannoy H. S.	21	22
5	(Chinese Taipei) Chou T-c	18	19
(India) L Sen	21	21
(Denmark) A Antonsen	21	21
(Denmark) R Gemke	16	18

Second round
3	(Indonesia) A S Ginting	22	15	21
(India) Prannoy H. S.	20	21	17
(India) L Sen	13	15
(Denmark) A Antonsen	21	21

Quarter-finals
3	(Indonesia) A S Ginting	14	21	17
(Denmark) A Antonsen	21	9	21

=== Bottom half ===
==== Section 3 ====
First round
(India) S Kidambi	19	21	21
(France) T J Popov	21	14	5
(China) Lu GZ	7^{r}
7	(Japan) K Naraoka	11
(Japan) K Nishimoto	21	21
(Canada) B Yang	16	14
(Thailand) S Thammasin	12	15
4	(Malaysia) Lee Z J	21	21

Second round
(India) S Kidambi	17	15
7	(Japan) K Naraoka	21	21
(Japan) K Nishimoto	15	10
4	(Malaysia) Lee Z J	21	21

Quarter-finals
7	(Japan) K Naraoka	9	21	13
4	(Malaysia) Lee Z J	21	10	21

==== Section 4 ====
First round
(Japan) K Tsuneyama	16	11
(China) Shi YQ	21	21
(Japan) K Momota	21	15
6	(Thailand) K Vitidsarn	23	21
(Indonesia) C A Dwi Wardoyo	21	21
(Malaysia) Liew D	9	16
(China) Weng HY	21	21
2	(Indonesia) J Christie	6	11

Second round
(China) Shi YQ	21	21
6	(Thailand) K Vitidsarn	12	13
(Indonesia) C A Dwi Wardoyo	11	21	13
(China) Weng HY	21	15	21

Quarter-finals
(China) Shi YQ	21	21
(China) Weng HY	9	16

== Women's singles ==
=== Seeds ===
1. (Japan) Akane Yamaguchi (semi-finals)
2. (South Korea) An Se-young (champion)
3. (Chinese Taipei) Tai Tzu-ying (semi-finals)
4. (China) Chen Yufei (final)
5. (China) He Bingjiao (quarter-finals)
6. (China) Wang Zhiyi (quarter-finals)
7. (Spain) Carolina Marín (quarter-finals)
8. (Thailand) Ratchanok Intanon (first round)

=== Finals ===
Semi-finals
1	(Japan) Akane Yamaguchi	17	8
4	(China) Chen Yufei	21	21
3	(Chinese Taipei) Tai Tzu-ying	21	19	22
2	(South Korea) An Se-young	17	21	24

Final
4	(China) Chen Yufei	17	21	19
2	(South Korea) An Se-young	21	10	21

=== Top half ===
==== Section 1 ====
First round
1	(Japan) A Yamaguchi	21	21
(Denmark) M Blichfeldt	9	10
(Germany) Y Li	12	22	13
(Malaysia) Goh J W	21	20	12^{r}
6	(China) Wang ZY	23	21
(Japan) S Kawakami	21	11
(China) Han Y	21	21
PFR	(Singapore) Yeo J M	10	7

Second round
1	(Japan) A Yamaguchi	21	21
(Germany) Y Li	13	17
6	(China) Wang ZY	21	21
(China) Han Y	14	16

Quarter-finals
1	(Japan) A Yamaguchi	21	21
6	(China) Wang ZY	19	12

==== Section 2 ====
First round
4	(China) Chen YF	22	21
(Canada) M Li	20	14
(Japan) N Okuhara	11	15
(Thailand) P Chochuwong	21	21
8	(Thailand) R Intanon	16	17
(Thailand) L Chaiwan	21	21
(Indonesia) G M Tunjung	15	21	22
(Denmark) L Kjærsfeldt	21	12	20

Second round
4	(China) Chen YF	21	24
(Thailand) P Chochuwong	18	22
(Thailand) L Chaiwan	11	19
(Indonesia) G M Tunjung	21	21

Quarter-finals
4	(China) Chen YF	24	23
(Indonesia) G M Tunjung	22	21

=== Bottom half ===
==== Section 3 ====
First round
(China) Zhang YM	21	21
(India) P. V. Sindhu	17	11
(United States) I Wang	21	17	6
5	(China) He BJ	17	21	21
(Thailand) B Ongbamrungphan	21	21
(Japan) A Ohori	15	15
(South Korea) Kim G-e	10	12
3	(Chinese Taipei) Tai T-y	21	21

Second round
(China) Zhang YM	22	21	12
5	(China) He BJ	24	18	21
(Thailand) B Ongbamrungphan	19	12
3	(Chinese Taipei) Tai T-y	21	21

Quarter-finals
5	(China) He BJ	12	11
3	(Chinese Taipei) Tai T-y	21	21

==== Section 4 ====
First round
(Thailand) S Katethong	17	14
(United States) BW Zhang	21	21
(Scotland) K Gilmour	19	17
7	(Spain) C Marín	21	21
(Chinese Taipei) Pai Y-p	17	21	21
(Denmark) L Christophersen	21	16	17
(Chinese Taipei) Hsu W-c	10	12
2	(South Korea) An S-y	21	21

Second round
(United States) BW Zhang	13	18
7	(Spain) C Marín	21	21
(Chinese Taipei) Pai Y-p	3	7
2	(South Korea) An S-y	21	21

Quarter-finals
7	(Spain) C Marín
2	(South Korea) An S-y	w	/	o

== Men's doubles ==
=== Seeds ===
1. (Indonesia) Fajar Alfian / Muhammad Rian Ardianto (champions)
2. (Malaysia) Aaron Chia / Soh Wooi Yik (first round)
3. (Indonesia) Mohammad Ahsan / Hendra Setiawan (final)
4. (Japan) Takuro Hoki / Yugo Kobayashi (quarter-finals)
5. (China) Liu Yuchen / Ou Xuanyi (quarter-finals)
6. (India) Satwiksairaj Rankireddy / Chirag Shetty (second round)
7. (Denmark) Kim Astrup / Anders Skaarup Rasmussen (second round)
8. (Malaysia) Ong Yew Sin / Teo Ee Yi (second round)

=== Finals ===
Semi-finals
1	(Indonesia) Fajar Alfian (Indonesia) Muhammad Rian Ardianto	21	21
(China) He Jiting (China) Zhou Haodong	19	17
3	(Indonesia) Mohammad Ahsan (Indonesia) Hendra Setiawan	21	19	29
(China) Liang Weikeng (China) Wang Chang	15	21	27

Final
1	(Indonesia) Fajar Alfian (Indonesia) Muhammad Rian Ardianto	21	21
3	(Indonesia) Mohammad Ahsan (Indonesia) Hendra Setiawan	17	14

=== Top half ===
==== Section 1 ====
First round
1	(Indonesia) F Alfian (Indonesia) M R Ardianto	20	21	21
(South Korea) Kang M-h (South Korea) Seo S-j	22	12	19
(Chinese Taipei) Lee J-h (Chinese Taipei) Yang P-hs	20	21	21
(France) C Popov (France) T J Popov	22	17	13
8	(Malaysia) Ong Y S (Malaysia) Teo E Y	12	21	21
(Chinese Taipei) Lee Y (Chinese Taipei) Wang C-l	21	16	18
(South Korea) Kim G-j (South Korea) Kim S-r	15	21	16
(Indonesia) M S Fikri (Indonesia) B Maulana	21	13	21

Second round
1	(Indonesia) F Alfian (Indonesia) M R Ardianto	22	21
(Chinese Taipei) Lee J-h (Chinese Taipei) Yang P-hs	20	15
8	(Malaysia) Ong Y S (Malaysia) Teo E Y	18	18
(Indonesia) M S Fikri (Indonesia) B Maulana	21	21

Quarter-finals
1	(Indonesia) F Alfian (Indonesia) M R Ardianto	21	21
(Indonesia) M S Fikri (Indonesia) B Maulana	18	13

==== Section 2 ====
First round
4	(Japan) T Hoki (Japan) Y Kobayashi	21	21
(Japan) K Matsui (Japan) Y Takeuchi	12	14
(Scotland) A Dunn (Scotland) A Hall	21	21
(South Korea) Choi S-g (South Korea) Kim W-h	15	14
7	(Denmark) K Astrup (Denmark) A S Rasmussen	18	21	21
(Germany) M Lamsfuß (Germany) M Seidel	21	14	17
(China) He JT (China) Zhou HD	21	21
(Chinese Taipei) Lu C-y (Chinese Taipei) Yang P-ha	10	12

Second round
4	(Japan) T Hoki (Japan) Y Kobayashi	21	21
(Scotland) A Dunn (Scotland) A Hall	17	17
7	(Denmark) K Astrup (Denmark) A S Rasmussen	15	10
(China) He JT (China) Zhou HD	21	21

Quarter-finals
4	(Japan) T Hoki (Japan) Y Kobayashi	21	18	15
(China) He JT (China) Zhou HD	17	21	21

=== Bottom half ===
==== Section 3 ====
First round
(India) Arjun M. R. (India) D Kapila	16	15
(China) Ren XY (China) Tan Q	21	21
(England) B Lane (England) S Vendy	18	21	16
5	(China) Liu YC (China) Ou XY	21	17	21
(Netherlands) R Jille (Netherlands) T van der Lecq	16	15
PFR	(France) L Corvée (France) R Labar	21	21
(Indonesia) P Kusumawardana (Indonesia) Y Rambitan	23	18
3	(Indonesia) M Ahsan (Indonesia) H Setiawan	25	21

Second round
(China) Ren XY (China) Tan Q	18	20
5	(China) Liu YC (China) Ou XY	21	22
PFR	(France) L Corvée (France) R Labar	14	13
3	(Indonesia) M Ahsan (Indonesia) H Setiawan	21	21

Quarter-finals
5	(China) Liu YC (China) Ou XY	21	19	19
3	(Indonesia) M Ahsan (Indonesia) H Setiawan	16	21	21

==== Section 4 ====
First round
(China) Liang WK (China) Wang C	21	21
(Thailand) S Jomkoh (Thailand) K Kedren	13	18
PFR	(India) K P Garaga (India) V G Panjala	13	13
6	(India) S Rankireddy (India) C Shetty	21	21
(Denmark) J Bay (Denmark) L Mølhede	18	23	24
(Japan) A Koga (Japan) T Saito	21	21	22
(Indonesia) L R Carnando (Indonesia) D Marthin	21	14	21
2	(Malaysia) A Chia (Malaysia) Soh W Y	18	21	13

Second round
(China) Liang WK (China) Wang C	10	21	21
6	(India) S Rankireddy (India) C Shetty	21	17	19
(Denmark) J Bay (Denmark) L Mølhede	15	16
(Indonesia) L R Carnando (Indonesia) D Marthin	21	21

Quarter-finals
(China) Liang WK (China) Wang C	13	21	21
(Indonesia) L R Carnando (Indonesia) D Marthin	21	19	18

== Women's doubles ==
=== Seeds ===
1. (China) Chen Qingchen / Jia Yifan (quarter-finals)
2. (Japan) Nami Matsuyama / Chiharu Shida (second round)
3. (China) Zhang Shuxian / Zheng Yu (semi-finals)
4. (South Korea) Jeong Na-eun / Kim Hye-jeong (first round)
5. (Malaysia) Pearly Tan / Thinaah Muralitharan (first round)
6. (South Korea) Kim So-yeong / Kong Hee-yong (champions)
7. (Thailand) Jongkolphan Kititharakul / Rawinda Prajongjai (first round)
8. (Indonesia) Apriyani Rahayu / Siti Fadia Silva Ramadhanti (quarter-finals)

=== Finals ===
Semi-finals
6	(South Korea) Kim So-yeong (South Korea) Kong Hee-yong	21	25
3	(China) Zhang Shuxian (China) Zheng Yu	14	23
(India) Treesa Jolly (India) Gayatri Gopichand	10	10
(South Korea) Baek Ha-na (South Korea) Lee So-hee	21	21

Final
6	(South Korea) Kim So-yeong (South Korea) Kong Hee-yong	21	21
(South Korea) Baek Ha-na (South Korea) Lee So-hee	5	12

=== Top half ===
==== Section 1 ====
First round
1	(China) Chen QC (China) Jia YF	21	21
(Japan) R Iwanaga (Japan) K Nakanishi	11	13
(Netherlands) D Jille (Netherlands) C Seinen	18	23	16
(Denmark) M Fruergaard (Denmark) S Thygesen	21	21	21
6	(South Korea) Kim S-y (South Korea) Kong H-y	21	21
(Germany) L Efler (Germany) I Lohau	11	3
(Chinese Taipei) Lee C-h (Chinese Taipei) Teng C-h	21	21
(Bulgaria) G Stoeva (Bulgaria) S Stoeva	19	16

Second round
1	(China) Chen QC (China) Jia YF	21	21
(Denmark) M Fruergaard (Denmark) S Thygesen	12	15
6	(South Korea) Kim S-y (South Korea) Kong H-y	21	21
(Chinese Taipei) Lee C-h (Chinese Taipei) Teng C-h	11	13

Quarter-finals
1	(China) Chen QC (China) Jia YF	21	20	22
6	(South Korea) Kim S-y (South Korea) Kong H-y	19	22	24

==== Section 2 ====
First round
3	(China) Zhang SX (China) Zheng Y	21	21
(Japan) R Hirokami (Japan) Y Kato	11	12
(France) M Lambert (France) A Tran	21	18	21
(Malaysia) V Hoo (Malaysia) Lim C S	19	21	15
5	(Malaysia) P Tan (Malaysia) Thinaah M	13	21	15
(Japan) M Matsumoto (Japan) W Nagahara	21	15	21
(United States) S Gurazada (United States) I Jaiswal	9	18
(England) C Birch (England) L Smith	21	21

Second round
3	(China) Zhang SX (China) Zheng Y	21	24
(France) M Lambert (France) A Tran	19	22
(Japan) M Matsumoto (Japan) W Nagahara	21	21
(England) C Birch (England) L Smith	9	10

Quarter-finals
3	(China) Zhang SX (China) Zheng Y	21	22
(Japan) M Matsumoto (Japan) W Nagahara	13	20

=== Bottom half ===
==== Section 3 ====
First round
(Scotland) J Macpherson (Scotland) C Torrance	10	3^{r}
(Japan) Y Fukushima (Japan) S Hirota	21	11
(India) T Jolly (India) G Gopichand	21	21
7	(Thailand) J Kititharakul (Thailand) R Prajongjai	18	14
(Hong Kong) Ng T Y (Hong Kong) Tsang H Y	13	14
(China) Li WM (China) Liu XX	21	21
(Hong Kong) Yeung N T (Hong Kong) Yeung P L	12	21	21
4	(South Korea) Jeong N-e (South Korea) Kim H-j	21	19	14

Second round
(Japan) Y Fukushima (Japan) S Hirota	14	22
(India) T Jolly (India) G Gopichand	21	24
(China) Li WM (China) Liu XX	21	24
(Hong Kong) Yeung N T (Hong Kong) Yeung P L	7	22

Quarter-finals
(India) T Jolly (India) G Gopichand	21	18	21
(China) Li WM (China) Liu XX	14	21	12

==== Section 4 ====
First round
(Thailand) S Paewsampran (Thailand) P Supajirakul	21	20	21
(Singapore) Jin YJ (Singapore) C Wong	14	22	12
PFR	(Brazil) J Lima (Brazil) S Lima	12	14
8	(Indonesia) A Rahayu (Indonesia) S F S Ramadhanti	21	21
(India) A Bhat (India) S Gautam	9	8
(South Korea) Baek H-n (South Korea) Lee S-h	21	21
(Canada) C Choi (Canada) J Wu	18	7
2	(Japan) N Matsuyama (Japan) C Shida	21	21

Second round
(Thailand) S Paewsampran (Thailand) P Supajirakul	16	19
8	(Indonesia) A Rahayu (Indonesia) S F S Ramadhanti	21	21
(South Korea) Baek H-n (South Korea) Lee S-h	18	21	21
2	(Japan) N Matsuyama (Japan) C Shida	21	19	9

Quarter-finals
8	(Indonesia) A Rahayu (Indonesia) S F S Ramadhanti	11	21	14
(South Korea) Baek H-n (South Korea) Lee S-h	21	14	21

== Mixed doubles ==
=== Seeds ===
1. (China) Zheng Siwei / Huang Yaqiong (champions)
2. (Japan) Yuta Watanabe / Arisa Higashino (second round)
3. (Thailand) Dechapol Puavaranukroh / Sapsiree Taerattanachai (quarter-finals)
4. (France) Thom Gicquel / Delphine Delrue (second round)
5. (China) Feng Yanzhe / Huang Dongping (first round)
6. (Malaysia) Tan Kian Meng / Lai Pei Jing (second round)
7. (Malaysia) Goh Soon Huat / Lai Shevon Jemie (first round)
8. (Germany) Mark Lamsfuß / Isabel Lohau (first round)

=== Finals ===
Semi-finals
1	(China) Zheng Siwei (China) Huang Yaqiong	21	13	21
(Indonesia) Rehan Naufal Kusharjanto (Indonesia) Lisa Ayu Kusumawati	17	21	13
(South Korea) Seo Seung-jae (South Korea) Chae Yoo-jung	21	28
(South Korea) Kim Won-ho (South Korea) Jeong Na-eun	14	26

Final
1	(China) Zheng Siwei (China) Huang Yaqiong	21	16	21
(South Korea) Seo Seung-jae (South Korea) Chae Yoo-jung	16	21	12

=== Top half ===
==== Section 1 ====
First round
1	(China) Zheng SW (China) Huang YQ	21	21
(Denmark) M Thyrri (Denmark) A Magelund	9	15
(Japan) H Midorikawa (Japan) N Saito	20	21	24
(Hong Kong) Lee C H (Hong Kong) Ng T Y	22	18	26
6	(Malaysia) Tan K M (Malaysia) Lai P J	21	21
(Indonesia) R Rivaldy (Indonesia) P H Mentari	19	18
(Malaysia) Chen T J (Malaysia) Toh E W	19	24	17
(Japan) Y Kaneko (Japan) M Matsutomo	21	22	21

Second round
1	(China) Zheng SW (China) Huang YQ	20	21	21
(Hong Kong) Lee C H (Hong Kong) Ng T Y	22	14	18
6	(Malaysia) Tan K M (Malaysia) Lai P J	12	21	19
(Japan) Y Kaneko (Japan) M Matsutomo	21	11	21

Quarter-finals
1	(China) Zheng SW (China) Huang YQ	21	21
(Japan) Y Kaneko (Japan) M Matsutomo	13	11

==== Section 2 ====
First round
4	(France) T Gicquel (France) D Delrue	21	21
(South Korea) Ko S-h (South Korea) Eom H-w	19	15
(Germany) J R Jansen (Germany) L Efler	19	16
(Indonesia) R N Kusharjanto (Indonesia) L A Kusumawati	21	21
5	(China) Feng YZ (China) Huang DP	15	16
(Chinese Taipei) Ye H-w (Chinese Taipei) Lee C-h	21	21
(Japan) K Yamashita (Japan) N Shinoya	21	21
(England) M Ellis (England) L Smith	16	17

Second round
4	(France) T Gicquel (France) D Delrue	12	17
(Indonesia) R N Kusharjanto (Indonesia) L A Kusumawati	21	21
(Chinese Taipei) Ye H-w (Chinese Taipei) Lee C-h	16	12
(Japan) K Yamashita (Japan) N Shinoya	21	21

Quarter-finals
(Indonesia) R N Kusharjanto (Indonesia) L A Kusumawati	21	15	21
(Japan) K Yamashita (Japan) N Shinoya	19	21	19

=== Bottom half ===
==== Section 3 ====
First round
(Singapore) T Hee (Singapore) J Tan	11	19
(Thailand) S Jomkoh (Thailand) S Paewsampran	21	21
(South Korea) Seo S-j (South Korea) Chae Y-j	21	21
7	(Malaysia) Goh S H (Malaysia) S J Lai	10	14
(Indonesia) P Jordan (Indonesia) M D Oktavianti	19	21	21
(Indonesia) D Ferdinansyah (Indonesia) G E Widjaja	21	17	18
(Denmark) M Christiansen (Denmark) A Bøje	12	20
3	(Thailand) D Puavaranukroh (Thailand) S Taerattanachai	21	22

Second round
(Thailand) S Jomkoh (Thailand) S Paewsampran	17	17
(South Korea) Seo S-j (South Korea) Chae Y-j	21	21
(Indonesia) P Jordan (Indonesia) M D Oktavianti	18	11
3	(Thailand) D Puavaranukroh (Thailand) S Taerattanachai	21	21

Quarter-finals
(South Korea) Seo S-j (South Korea) Chae Y-j	21	13	21
3	(Thailand) D Puavaranukroh (Thailand) S Taerattanachai	18	21	14

==== Section 4 ====
First round
(Scotland) A Hall (Scotland) J MacPherson	16	14
(Netherlands) R Tabeling (Netherlands) S Piek	21	21
PFR	(Indonesia) Z J Sumanti (Indonesia) H Julimarbela	21	21
8	(Germany) M Lamsfuß (Germany) I Lohau	17	18
(England) G Mairs (England) J Moore	21	9	19
(South Korea) Kim W-h (South Korea) Jeong N-e	15	21	21
(Hong Kong) Tang C M (Hong Kong) Tse Y S	17	17
2	(Japan) Y Watanabe (Japan) A Higashino	21	21

Second round
(Netherlands) R Tabeling (Netherlands) S Piek	21	21
PFR	(Indonesia) Z J Sumanti (Indonesia) H Julimarbela	18	10
(South Korea) Kim W-h (South Korea) Jeong N-e	23	13
2	(Japan) Y Watanabe (Japan) A Higashino	21	7^{r}

Quarter-finals
(Netherlands) R Tabeling (Netherlands) S Piek	14	15
(South Korea) Kim W-h (South Korea) Jeong N-e	21	21

Preceded by 2023 German Open	BWF World Tour; 2023 BWF season	Succeeded by 2023 Swiss Open
