= 2023 Indonesia Open =

Tournament details
- Dates: 13–18 June
- Level: Super 1000
- Total prize money: US$1,250,000
- Venue: Istora Gelora Bung Karno
- Location: Jakarta, Indonesia

Champions
- Men's singles: (Denmark) Viktor Axelsen
- Women's singles: (China) Chen Yufei
- Men's doubles: (India) Satwiksairaj Rankireddy (India) Chirag Shetty
- Women's doubles: (South Korea) Baek Ha-na (South Korea) Lee So-hee
- Mixed doubles: (China) Zheng Siwei (China) Huang Yaqiong

The 2023 Indonesia Open (officially known as the Kapal Api Group Indonesia Open 2023 for sponsorship reasons) was a badminton tournament which took place at the Istora Gelora Bung Karno in Jakarta, Indonesia, from 13 to 18 June 2023. It had a total prize of US$1,250,000.

== Tournament ==
The 2023 Indonesia Open tournament was included in the 2023 BWF World Tour. It was a part of the Indonesia Open which had been held since 1982 and was organized by the Badminton Association of Indonesia with sanction from BWF.

=== Venue ===
This international tournament took place at the Istora Gelora Bung Karno inside the Gelora Bung Karno Sports Complex in Central Jakarta, Jakarta, Indonesia.

=== Point distribution ===
Below is the point distribution table for each phase of the tournament based on the BWF points system for the BWF World Tour Super 1000 event.

Winner	Runner-up	3/4	5/8	9/16	17/32
12,000	10,200	8,400	6,600	4,800	3,000

=== Prize money ===
The total prize money for this tournament was US$1,200,000. The distribution of the prize money was in accordance with BWF regulations.

Event	Winner	Finalist	Semi-finals	Quarter-finals	Last 16	Last 32
Singles	$87,500	$42,500	$17,500	$6,875	$3,750	$1,250
Doubles	$92,500	$43,750	$17,500	$7,812.50	$4,062.50	$1,250

== Men's singles ==
=== Seeds ===
1. (Denmark) Viktor Axelsen (Champion)
2. (Indonesia) Anthony Sinisuka Ginting (Final)
3. (Japan) Kodai Naraoka (Quarter-finals)
4. (Singapore) Loh Kean Yew (Second round)
5. (Chinese Taipei) Chou Tien-chen (Quarter-finals)
6. (Indonesia) Jonatan Christie (Quarter-finals)
7. (India) Prannoy H. S. (Semi-finals)
8. (Malaysia) Lee Zii Jia (First round)

=== Finals ===
Semi-finals
1	(Denmark) Viktor Axelsen	21	21
7	(India) Prannoy H. S.	15	15
(China) Li Shifeng	17	15
2	(Indonesia) Anthony Sinisuka Ginting	21	21

Final
1	(Denmark) Viktor Axelsen	21	21
2	(Indonesia) Anthony Sinisuka Ginting	14	13

=== Top half ===
==== Section 1 ====
First round
1	(Denmark) V Axelsen	21	21
(China) Weng HY	12	8
(Thailand) K Wangcharoen	12	9
(Chinese Taipei) Wang T-w	21	21
5	(Chinese Taipei) Chou T-c	15	22	21
PFR	(France) C Popov	21	20	1
(Republic of Ireland) N Nguyen	18	20
(Canada) B Yang	21	22

Second round
1	(Denmark) V Axelsen	21	21
(Chinese Taipei) Wang T-w	8	13
5	(Chinese Taipei) Chou T-c	21	21
(Canada) B Yang	16	8

Quarter-finals
1	(Denmark) V Axelsen	21	21
5	(Chinese Taipei) Chou T-c	5	19

==== Section 2 ====
First round
3	(Japan) K Naraoka	14	21	21
(Denmark) A Antonsen	21	7	17
(China) Shi YQ	21	17	21
(Malaysia) Ng T Y	7	21	13
7	(India) Prannoy H. S.	21	21
(Japan) K Nishimoto	16	14
(Japan) K Momota	8	15
(Hong Kong) Ng K L	21	21

Second round
3	(Japan) K Naraoka	17	21	21
(China) Shi YQ	21	12	18
7	(India) Prannoy H. S.	21	21
(Hong Kong) Ng K L	18	16

Quarter-finals
3	(Japan) K Naraoka	18	16
7	(India) Prannoy H. S.	21	21

=== Bottom half ===
==== Section 3 ====
First round
(India) S Kidambi	21	21
(China) Lu GZ	13	19
(India) L Sen	21	21
8	(Malaysia) Lee Z J	17	13
(Hong Kong) Lee C Y	18	21	19
(China) Li SF	21	9	21
(Indonesia) C A D Wardoyo	15	21
4	(Singapore) Loh K Y	21	23

Second round
(India) S Kidambi	21	22
(India) L Sen	17	20
(China) Li SF	21	21
4	(Singapore) Loh K Y	19	14

Quarter-finals
(India) S Kidambi	14	21	12
(China) Li SF	21	14	21

==== Section 4 ====
First round
(France) T J Popov	21	21
(Chinese Taipei) Lin C-y	18	15
(Japan) K Tsuneyama	17	10
6	(Indonesia) J Christie	21	21
PFR	(India) P Rajawat	w	/	o
(Thailand) K Vitidsarn
(Denmark) H-K Vittinghus	8	10
2	(Indonesia) A S Ginting	21	21

Second round
(France) T J Popov	21	11	11
6	(Indonesia) J Christie	19	21	21
PFR	(India) P Rajawat	22	15	15
2	(Indonesia) A S Ginting	20	21	21

Quarter-finals
6	(Indonesia) J Christie	19	16
2	(Indonesia) A S Ginting	21	21

== Women's singles ==
=== Seeds ===
1. (Japan) Akane Yamaguchi (Quarter-finals)
2. (South Korea) An Se-young (Semi-finals)
3. (Chinese Taipei) Tai Tzu-ying (Quarter-finals)
4. (China) Chen Yufei (Champion)
5. (China) He Bingjiao (Quarter-finals)
6. (Spain) Carolina Marín (Final)
7. (China) Wang Zhiyi (Second round)
8. (Thailand) Ratchanok Intanon (Semi-finals)

=== Finals ===
Semi-finals
8	(Thailand) Ratchanok Intanon	12	11
6	(Spain) Carolina Marín	21	21
4	(China) Chen Yufei	21	21
2	(South Korea) An Se-young	8	17

Final
6	(Spain) Carolina Marín	18	19
4	(China) Chen Yufei	21	21

=== Top half ===
==== Section 1 ====
First round
1	(Japan) A Yamaguchi	6	21	22
(China) Zhang YM	21	7	20
(United States) I Wang	21	20	21
(Indonesia) P K Wardani	15	22	23
8	(Thailand) R Intanon	21	21
(Chinese Taipei) Hsu W-c	16	18
(Thailand) P Chochuwong	21	21
(Thailand) S Katethong	17	18

Second round
1	(Japan) A Yamaguchi	21	21
(Indonesia) P K Wardani	15	11
8	(Thailand) R Intanon	21	21
(Thailand) P Chochuwong	13	17

Quarter-finals
1	(Japan) A Yamaguchi	21	23	16
8	(Thailand) R Intanon	18	25	21

==== Section 2 ====
First round
3	(Chinese Taipei) Tai T-y	21	21
(China) Han Y	15	17
(India) P V Sindhu	21	21
(Indonesia) G M Tunjung	19	15
6	(Spain) C Marín	21	21
(Malaysia) Goh J W	11	11
(Japan) N Okuhara	6^{r}
(Singapore) Yeo J M	4

Second round
3	(Chinese Taipei) Tai T-y	21	21
(India) P V Sindhu	18	16
6	(Spain) C Marín	26	23
(Singapore) Yeo J M	24	21

Quarter-finals
3	(Chinese Taipei) Tai T-y	18	13
6	(Spain) C Marín	21	21

=== Bottom half ===
==== Section 3 ====
First round
(Canada) M Li	24	17	21
(South Korea) Kim G-e	22	21	23
PFR	(Myanmar) Thet Htar T	11	9
7	(China) Wang ZY	21	21
(Japan) S Kawakami	21	21
(Japan) A Ohori	15	7
(Japan) N Nidaira	17	11
4	(China) Chen YF	21	21

Second round
(South Korea) Kim G-e	21	22
7	(China) Wang ZY	19	20
(Japan) S Kawakami	13	19
4	(China) Chen YF	21	21

Quarter-finals
(South Korea) Kim G-e	11	19
4	(China) Chen YF	21	21

==== Section 4 ====
First round
(Germany) Y Li	21	21
PFR	(Spain) C Azurmendi	16	15
(Chinese Taipei) Pai Y-p	23	10	13
5	(China) He BJ	21	21	21
(United States) B Zhang	16	11
(Scotland) K Gilmour	21	21
(India) A Kashyap	10	4
2	(South Korea) An S-y	21	21

Second round
(Germany) Y Li	16	14
5	(China) He BJ	21	21
(Scotland) K Gilmour	11	9
2	(South Korea) An S-y	21	21

Quarter-finals
5	(China) He BJ	18	21	11
2	(South Korea) An S-y	21	19	21

== Men's doubles ==
=== Seeds ===
1. (Indonesia) Fajar Alfian / Muhammad Rian Ardianto (Quarter-finals)
2. (Malaysia) Aaron Chia / Soh Wooi Yik (Final)
3. (Japan) Takuro Hoki / Yugo Kobayashi (Second round)
4. (Indonesia) Mohammad Ahsan / Hendra Setiawan (Second round)
5. (China) Liu Yuchen / Ou Xuanyi (Second round)
6. (China) Liang Weikeng / Wang Chang (Quarter-finals)
7. (India) Satwiksairaj Rankireddy / Chirag Shetty (Champions)
8. (Malaysia) Teo Ee Yi / Ong Yew Sin (Second round)

=== Finals ===
Semi-finals
7	(India) Satwiksairaj Rankireddy (India) Chirag Shetty	17	21	21
(South Korea) Kang Min-hyuk (South Korea) Seo Seung-jae	21	19	18
(Indonesia) Pramudya Kusumawardana (Indonesia) Yeremia Rambitan	21	21	13
2	(Malaysia) Aaron Chia (Malaysia) Soh Wooi Yik	12	23	21

Final
7	(India) Satwiksairaj Rankireddy (India) Chirag Shetty	21	21
2	(Malaysia) Aaron Chia (Malaysia) Soh Wooi Yik	17	18

=== Top half ===
==== Section 1 ====
First round
1	(Indonesia) F Alfian (Indonesia) M R Ardianto	21	21
(Denmark) J Bay (Denmark) L Mølhede	15	11
(China) Ren XY (China) Tan Q	21	21
(Chinese Taipei) Lee J-h (Chinese Taipei) Yang P-hs	15	16
7	(India) S Rankireddy (India) C Shetty	21	11
PFR	(France) C Popov (France) T J Popov	12	7^{r}
(France) L Corvée (France) R Labar	12	23	9
(China) He JT (China) Zhou HD	21	21	21

Second round
1	(Indonesia) F Alfian (Indonesia) M R Ardianto	21	21
(China) Ren XY (China) Tan Q	14	17
7	(India) S Rankireddy (India) C Shetty	21	21
(China) He JT (China) Zhou HD	17	15

Quarter-finals
1	(Indonesia) F Alfian (Indonesia) M R Ardianto	13	13
7	(India) S Rankireddy (India) C Shetty	21	21

==== Section 2 ====
First round
3	(Japan) T Hoki (Japan) Y Kobayashi	21	21
(Scotland) A Dunn (Scotland) A Hall	19	16
(South Korea) Kang M-h (South Korea) Seo S-j	15	21	21
(Chinese Taipei) Lu C-y (Chinese Taipei) Yang P-ha	21	11	12
8	(Malaysia) Ong Y S (Malaysia) Teo E Y	12	21	22
(India) Arjun M. R. (India) D Kapila	21	6	20
(Japan) A Endo (Japan) Y Takei	21	21	12
(Indonesia) L R Carnando (Indonesia) D Marthin	23	8	21

Second round
3	(Japan) T Hoki (Japan) Y Kobayashi	18	14
(South Korea) Kang M-h (South Korea) Seo S-j	21	21
8	(Malaysia) Ong Y S (Malaysia) Teo E Y	20	17
(Indonesia) L R Carnando (Indonesia) D Marthin	22	21

Quarter-finals
(South Korea) Kang M-h (South Korea) Seo S-j	21	21
(Indonesia) L R Carnando (Indonesia) D Marthin	14	10

=== Bottom half ===
==== Section 3 ====
First round
(Malaysia) Man W C (Malaysia) Tee K W	21	15	19
(Japan) K Matsui (Japan) Y Takeuchi	19	21	21
PFR	(Canada) K Lee (Canada) T A Lindeman	13	13
6	(China) Liang WK (China) Wang C	21	21
(Indonesia) P Kusumawardana (Indonesia) Y Rambitan	21	13	21
(England) B Lane (England) S Vendy	15	21	14
(Thailand) S Jomkoh (Thailand) K Kedren	16	17
4	(Indonesia) M Ahsan (Indonesia) H Setiawan	21	21

Second round
(Japan) K Matsui (Japan) Y Takeuchi	9	16
6	(China) Liang WK (China) Wang C	21	21
(Indonesia) P Kusumawardana (Indonesia) Y Rambitan	18	21	23
4	(Indonesia) M Ahsan (Indonesia) H Setiawan	21	19	21

Quarter-finals
6	(China) Liang WK (China) Wang C	21	17	19
(Indonesia) P Kusumawardana (Indonesia) Y Rambitan	16	21	21

==== Section 4 ====
First round
(Japan) A Koga (Japan) T Saito	21	17	21
(Chinese Taipei) Lee Y (Chinese Taipei) Wang C-l	18	21	12
(Denmark) K Astrup (Denmark) A S Rasmussen	21	19	15
5	(China) Liu YC (China) Ou XY	16	21	21
(Chinese Taipei) Su C-h (Chinese Taipei) Ye H-w	18	4^{r}
(South Korea) Choi S-g (South Korea) Kim W-h	21	11
(Indonesia) M S Fikri (Indonesia) B Maulana	16	12
2	(Malaysia) A Chia (Malaysia) Soh W Y	21	21

Second round
(Japan) A Koga (Japan) T Saito	18	24	21
5	(China) Liu YC (China) Ou XY	21	22	16
(South Korea) Choi S-g (South Korea) Kim W-h	19	16
2	(Malaysia) A Chia (Malaysia) Soh W Y	21	21

Quarter-finals
(Japan) A Koga (Japan) T Saito	10	15
2	(Malaysia) A Chia (Malaysia) Soh W Y	21	21

== Women's doubles ==
=== Seeds ===
1. (China) Chen Qingchen / Jia Yifan (Quarter-finals)
2. (Japan) Nami Matsuyama / Chiharu Shida (First round)
3. (China) Zhang Shuxian / Zheng Yu (Quarter-finals)
4. (Indonesia) Apriyani Rahayu / Siti Fadia Silva Ramadhanti (Quarter-finals)
5. (South Korea) Baek Ha-na / Lee So-hee (Champions)
6. (South Korea) Jeong Na-eun / Kim Hye-jeong (Semi-finals)
7. (Japan) Yuki Fukushima / Sayaka Hirota (Final)
8. (South Korea) Kim So-yeong / Kong Hee-yong (First round)

=== Finals ===
Semi-finals
5	(South Korea) Baek Ha-na (South Korea) Lee So-hee	21	21
6	(South Korea) Jeong Na-eun (South Korea) Kim Hye-jeong	13	10
7	(Japan) Yuki Fukushima (Japan) Sayaka Hirota	21	12	21
(Japan) Mayu Matsumoto (Japan) Wakana Nagahara	16	21	13

Final
5	(South Korea) Baek Ha-na (South Korea) Lee So-hee	22	21
7	(Japan) Yuki Fukushima (Japan) Sayaka Hirota	20	10

=== Top half ===
==== Section 1 ====
First round
1	(China) Chen QC (China) Jia YF	21	21
(China) Li WM (China) Liu XX	17	16
(Indonesia) L T Mayasari (Indonesia) R Sugiarto	15	18
(Indonesia) F D Kusuma (Indonesia) A C Pratiwi	21	21
5	(South Korea) Baek H-n (South Korea) Lee S-h	21	21
(Japan) R Hirokami (Japan) Y Kato	16	12
(Japan) R Iwanaga (Japan) K Nakanishi	20	21	21
(India) G Gopichand (India) T Jolly	22	12	16

Second round
1	(China) Chen QC (China) Jia YF	21	21
(Indonesia) F D Kusuma (Indonesia) A C Pratiwi	11	12
5	(South Korea) Baek H-n (South Korea) Lee S-h	21	17	21
(Japan) R Iwanaga (Japan) K Nakanishi	15	21	10

Quarter-finals
1	(China) Chen QC (China) Jia YF	18	12
5	(South Korea) Baek H-n (South Korea) Lee S-h	21	21

==== Section 2 ====
First round
3	(China) Zhang SX (China) Zheng Y	21	21
(France) M Lambert (France) A Tran	14	18
PFR	(Indonesia) M T Puspita Sari (Indonesia) R A Rose	21	23
(Malaysia) V Hoo (Malaysia) Lim C S	18	21
6	(South Korea) Jeong N-e (South Korea) Kim H-j	21	21
(United States) S Gurazada (United States) I Jaiswal	15	7
(Hong Kong) Yeung N T (Hong Kong) Yeung P L	21	21
(Scotland) J MacPherson (Scotland) C Torrance	16	17

Second round
3	(China) Zhang SX (China) Zheng Y	21	21
PFR	(Indonesia) M T Puspita Sari (Indonesia) R A Rose	18	8
6	(South Korea) Jeong N-e (South Korea) Kim H-j	23	21
(Hong Kong) Yeung N T (Hong Kong) Yeung P L	21	11

Quarter-finals
3	(China) Zhang SX (China) Zheng Y	19	21	18
6	(South Korea) Jeong N-e (South Korea) Kim H-j	21	12	21

=== Bottom half ===
==== Section 3 ====
First round
(Netherlands) D Jille (Netherlands) C Seinen	14	19
(Chinese Taipei) Lee C-h (Chinese Taipei) Teng C-h	21	21
(England) C Birch (England) L Smith	11	17
7	(Japan) Y Fukushima (Japan) S Hirota	21	21
PFR	(Indonesia) R A Fatasya (Indonesia) K Larissa	17	12
(Canada) C Choi (Canada) J Wu	21	21
(Germany) L Efler (Germany) I Lohau	24	15
4	(Indonesia) A Rahayu (Indonesia) S F S Ramadhanti	26	21

Second round
(Chinese Taipei) Lee C-h (Chinese Taipei) Teng C-h	21	17	8
7	(Japan) Y Fukushima (Japan) S Hirota	15	21	21
(Canada) C Choi (Canada) J Wu	13	10
4	(Indonesia) A Rahayu (Indonesia) S F S Ramadhanti	21	21

Quarter-finals
7	(Japan) Y Fukushima (Japan) S Hirota	21	21
4	(Indonesia) A Rahayu (Indonesia) S F S Ramadhanti	13	13

==== Section 4 ====
First round
(Thailand) B Aimsaard (Thailand) N Aimsaard	21	21
(United States) A Xu (United States) K Xu	11	15
(Japan) M Matsumoto (Japan) W Nagahara	21	21
8	(South Korea) Kim S-y (South Korea) Kong H-y	17	16
(Singapore) Jin YJ (Singapore) C Wong	9	8
(Thailand) J Kititharakul (Thailand) R Prajongjai	21	21
(Japan) R Miyaura (Japan) A Sakuramoto	21	19	21
2	(Japan) N Matsuyama (Japan) C Shida	16	21	17

Second round
(Thailand) B Aimsaard (Thailand) N Aimsaard	21	9	12
(Japan) M Matsumoto (Japan) W Nagahara	9	21	21
(Thailand) J Kititharakul (Thailand) R Prajongjai	21	16	18
(Japan) R Miyaura (Japan) A Sakuramoto	13	21	21

Quarter-finals
(Japan) M Matsumoto (Japan) W Nagahara	21	21
(Japan) R Miyaura (Japan) A Sakuramoto	16	12

== Mixed doubles ==
=== Seeds ===
1. (China) Zheng Siwei / Huang Yaqiong (Champions)
2. (Japan) Yuta Watanabe / Arisa Higashino (Final)
3. (Thailand) Dechapol Puavaranukroh / Sapsiree Taerattanachai (Quarter-finals)
4. (South Korea) Seo Seung-jae / Chae Yoo-jung (Second round)
5. (France) Thom Gicquel / Delphine Delrue (First round)
6. (China) Feng Yanzhe / Huang Dongping (Semi-finals)
7. (Malaysia) Goh Soon Huat / Shevon Jamie Lai (First round)
8. (South Korea) Kim Won-ho / Jeong Na-eun (First round)

=== Finals ===
Semi-finals
1	(China) Zheng Siwei (China) Huang Yaqiong	21	21
6	(China) Feng Yanzhe (China) Huang Dongping	19	10
(Hong Kong) Tang Chun Man (Hong Kong) Tse Ying Suet	20	21	16
2	(Japan) Yuta Watanabe (Japan) Arisa Higashino	22	11	21

Final
1	(China) Zheng Siwei (China) Huang Yaqiong	21	21
2	(Japan) Yuta Watanabe (Japan) Arisa Higashino	14	11

=== Top half ===
==== Section 1 ====
First round
1	(China) Zheng SW (China) Huang YQ	21	21
PFR	(Indonesia) A Maulana (Indonesia) N V Marwah	15	9
(Japan) H Midorikawa (Japan) N Saito	21	15	21
(Malaysia) Chen T J (Malaysia) Toh E W	17	21	17
7	(Malaysia) Goh S H (Malaysia) S J Lai	21	24	17
(Indonesia) R N Kusharjanto (Indonesia) L A Kusumawati	13	26	21
(England) M Ellis (England) L Smith	19	12
(Denmark) M Thyrri (Denmark) A Magelund	21	21

Second round
1	(China) Zheng SW (China) Huang YQ	21	21
(Japan) H Midorikawa (Japan) N Saito	14	17
(Indonesia) R N Kusharjanto (Indonesia) L A Kusumawati	14	16
(Denmark) M Thyrri (Denmark) A Magelund	21	21

Quarter-finals
1	(China) Zheng SW (China) Huang YQ	21	21
(Denmark) M Thyrri (Denmark) A Magelund	14	10

==== Section 2 ====
First round
3	(Thailand) D Puavaranukroh (Thailand) S Taerattanachai	21	21
(Indonesia) Z J Sumanti (Indonesia) H Julimarbela	17	9
(Japan) Y Kaneko (Japan) M Matsutomo	18	21	16
(China) Jiang ZB (China) Wei YX	21	19	21
6	(China) Feng YZ (China) Huang DP	21	21
(Singapore) T Hee (Singapore) J Tan	15	10
(Denmark) M Christiansen (Denmark) A Bøje	21	20	21
(Chinese Taipei) Yang P-hs (Chinese Taipei) Hu L-f	17	22	9

Second round
3	(Thailand) D Puavaranukroh (Thailand) S Taerattanachai	21	21
(China) Jiang ZB (China) Wei YX	17	19
6	(China) Feng YZ (China) Huang DP	21	21
(Denmark) M Christiansen (Denmark) A Bøje	9	19

Quarter-finals
3	(Thailand) D Puavaranukroh (Thailand) S Taerattanachai	21	13	12
6	(China) Feng YZ (China) Huang DP	13	21	21

=== Bottom half ===
==== Section 3 ====
First round
(Malaysia) Chan P S (Malaysia) Cheah Y S	16	9
(Indonesia) P Jordan (Indonesia) M D Oktavianti	21	21
(Hong Kong) Tang C M (Hong Kong) Tse Y S	21	14	21
8	(South Korea) Kim W-h (South Korea) Jeong N-e	8	21	10
(Japan) K Yamashita (Japan) N Shinoya	24	12	19
(Netherlands) R Tabeling (Netherlands) S Piek	22	21	21
(Indonesia) D Ferdinansyah (Indonesia) G E Widjaja	15	17
4	(South Korea) Seo S-j (South Korea) Chae Y-j	21	21

Second round
(Indonesia) P Jordan (Indonesia) M D Oktavianti	17	14
(Hong Kong) Tang C M (Hong Kong) Tse Y S	21	21
(Netherlands) R Tabeling (Netherlands) S Piek	21	21
4	(South Korea) Seo S-j (South Korea) Chae Y-j	17	17

Quarter-finals
(Hong Kong) Tang C M (Hong Kong) Tse Y S	21	23	21
(Netherlands) R Tabeling (Netherlands) S Piek	15	25	18

==== Section 4 ====
First round
(Malaysia) Tan K M (Malaysia) Lai P J	21	21
(England) G Mairs (England) J Moore	14	13
(Indonesia) R Rivaldy (Indonesia) P H Mentari	21	21
5	(France) T Gicquel (France) D Delrue	14	15
(Hong Kong) Lee C H (Hong Kong) Ng T Y	18	21	23
(Chinese Taipei) Ye H-w (Chinese Taipei) Lee C-h	21	19	21
(Thailand) S Jomkoh (Thailand) S Paewsampran	21	13	7
2	(Japan) Y Watanabe (Japan) A Higashino	12	21	21

Second round
(Malaysia) Tan K M (Malaysia) Lai P J	17	16
(Indonesia) R Rivaldy (Indonesia) P H Mentari	21	21
(Hong Kong) Lee C H (Hong Kong) Ng T Y	21	13	13
2	(Japan) Y Watanabe (Japan) A Higashino	16	21	21

Quarter-finals
(Indonesia) R Rivaldy (Indonesia) P H Mentari	11	18
2	(Japan) Y Watanabe (Japan) A Higashino	21	21

Preceded by 2023 Singapore Open	BWF World Tour; 2023 BWF season	Succeeded by 2023 Taipei Open
