= Xiacheng District =

Xiacheng 下城区
- District
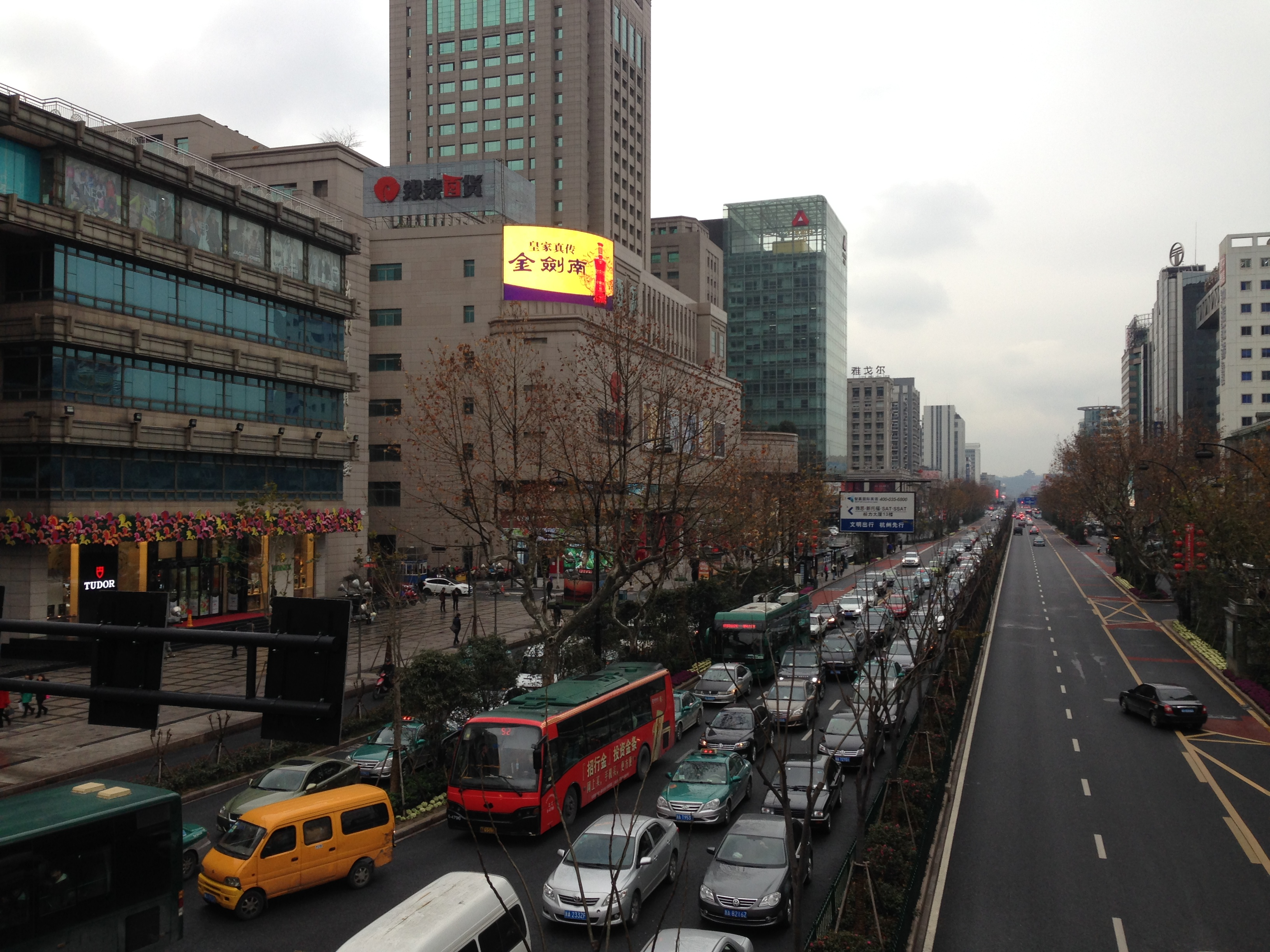
- Downtown Hangzhou in Xiacheng

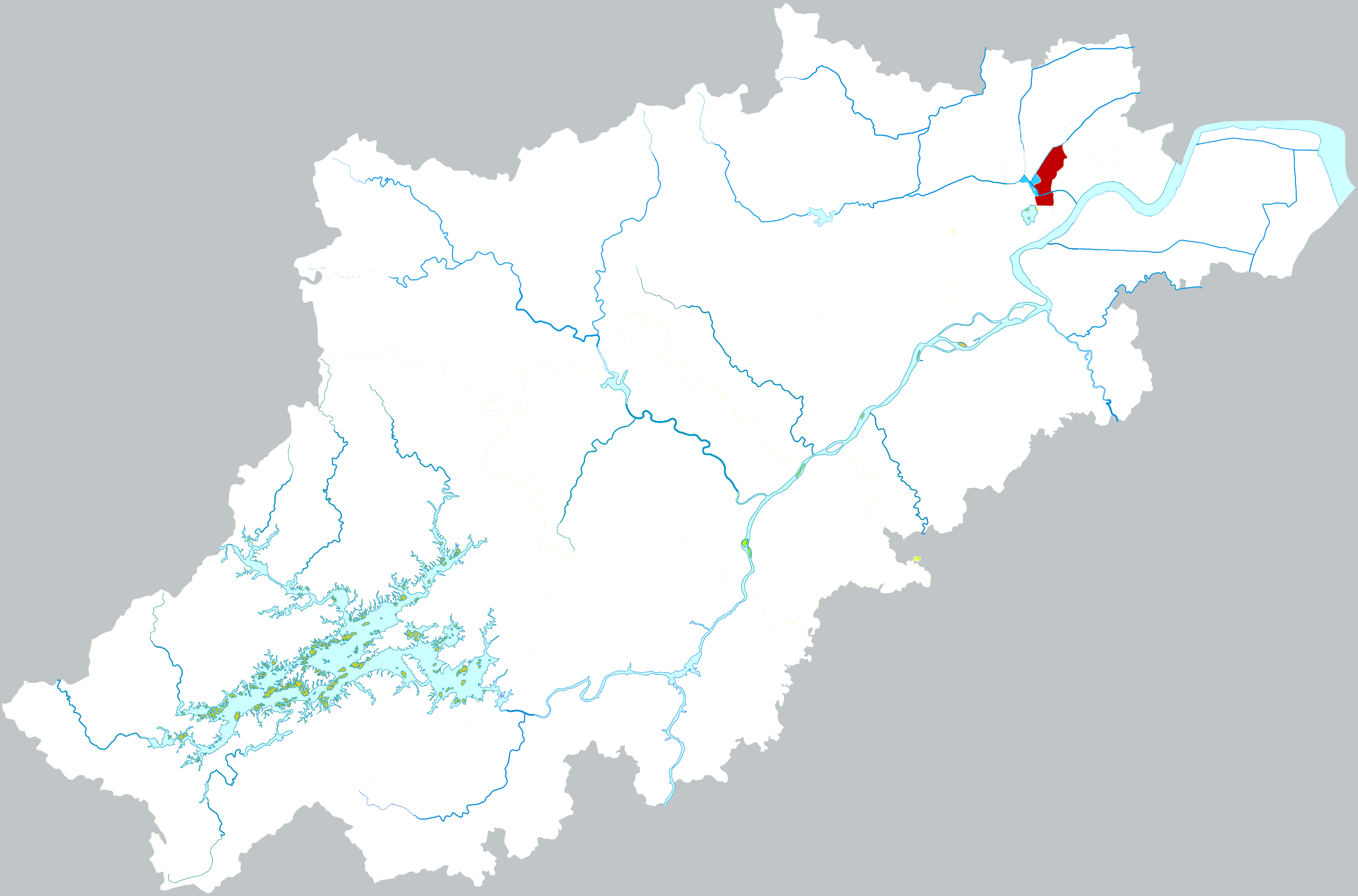
- Location of Xiacheng District within Hangzhou

- Location in Zhejiang
- Coordinates: 30°16′56″N 120°10′52″E
- Country: People's Republic of China
- Province: Zhejiang
- Sub-provincial city: Hangzhou

Area
  - Total: 29.33 km^{2} (11.32 sq mi)

Population
  - Total: 403,700
  - Density: 13,760/km^{2} (35,650/sq mi)
- Time zone: UTC+8 (China Standard)
- Website: www.hzxc.gov.cn

Xiacheng District
- Simplified Chinese: 下城区
- Traditional Chinese: 下城區
Transcriptions
Standard Mandarin
- Hanyu Pinyin: Xiàchéng Qū

Xiacheng District was one of the former urban districts of the prefecture-level city of Hangzhou, the capital of Zhejiang Province, East China, it is located in the core urban area of Hangzhou.

It has an area of 31 km^{2} (12 sq mi), and a population of 330,000. Its postal code is 310006.

The district government is located on 200 Qingchun Rd.

On April 9, 2021, the Xiacheng District was merged to Gongshu District.

== Administrative divisions ==
Subdistricts:

- Wulin Subdistrict (武林街道), Tianshui Subdistrict (天水街道), Chaohui Subdistrict (朝晖街道), Chaoming Subdistrict (潮鸣街道), Changqing Subdistrict (长庆街道), Shiqiao Subdistrict (石桥街道), Dongxin Subdistrict (东新街道), Wenhui Subdistrict (文晖街道)
