= 2023 India Open =

2023 badminton tournament in New Delhi

Tournament details
- Dates: 17–22 January
- Level: Super 750
- Total prize money: US$850,000
- Venue: K. D. Jadhav Indoor Hall
- Location: New Delhi, India

Champions
- Men's singles: (Thailand) Kunlavut Vitidsarn
- Women's singles: (South Korea) An Se-young
- Men's doubles: (China) Liang Weikeng (China) Wang Chang
- Women's doubles: (Japan) Nami Matsuyama (Japan) Chiharu Shida
- Mixed doubles: (Japan) Yuta Watanabe (Japan) Arisa Higashino

The 2023 India Open, officially known as the Yonex-Sunrise India Open 2023 for sponsorship reasons, was a badminton tournament that took place at the K. D. Jadhav Indoor Hall in New Delhi, India, from 17 to 22 January 2023. It had a total prize pool of US$850,000. This was the first India Open to have a Super 750 status.

== Tournament ==
The 2023 India Open was the second tournament of the 2023 BWF World Tour and was also part of the India Open championships, which had been held since 2008. The tournament was organized by the Badminton Association of India with sanction from the Badminton World Federation.

=== Venue ===
This international tournament was held at the K. D. Jadhav Indoor Hall in New Delhi, India.

=== Point distribution ===
Below is the point distribution table for each phase of the tournament based on the BWF points system for the BWF World Tour Super 750 event.

Winner	Runner-up	3/4	5/8	9/16	17/32
11,000	9,350	7,700	6,050	4,320	2,660

=== Prize money ===
The total prize money for this tournament was US$850,000 with the distribution of the prize money in accordance by BWF regulations.

Event	Winner	Finalist	Semi-finals	Quarter-finals	Last 16	Last 32
Singles	$59,500	$28,900	$11,900	$4,675	$2,550	$850
Doubles	$62,900	$29,750	$11,900	$5,312.50	$2762.50	$850

== Men's singles ==
=== Seeds ===
1. (Denmark) Viktor Axelsen (final)
2. (Malaysia) Lee Zii Jia (second round)
3. (Singapore) Loh Kean Yew (quarter-finals)
4. (Indonesia) Jonatan Christie (semi-finals)
5. (Chinese Taipei) Chou Tien-chen (quarter-finals)
6. (Indonesia) Anthony Sinisuka Ginting (semi-finals)
7. (India) Lakshya Sen (second round)
8. (Thailand) Kunlavut Vitidsarn (champion)

=== Finals ===
Semi-finals
1	(Denmark) Viktor Axelsen	21	21
4	(Indonesia) Jonatan Christie	6	12
8	(Thailand) Kunlavut Vitidsarn	27	21
6	(Indonesia) Anthony Sinisuka Ginting	25	15

Final
1	(Denmark) Viktor Axelsen	20	21	12
8	(Thailand) Kunlavut Vitidsarn	22	10	21

=== Top half ===
==== Section 1 ====
First round
1	(Denmark) V Axelsen	21	21
(India) S Kidambi	14	19
(Indonesia) C A Dwi Wardoyo	22	16	15
(China) Shi YQ	20	21	21
7	(India) L Sen	21	21
(India) Prannoy H. S.	14	15
(Japan) K Momota	15	11
(Denmark) R Gemke	21	21

Second round
1	(Denmark) V Axelsen	21	16	21
(China) Shi YQ	16	21	9
7	(India) L Sen	21	15	18
(Denmark) R Gemke	16	21	21

Quarter-finals
1	(Denmark) V Axelsen	16
(Denmark) R Gemke	8^{r}

==== Section 2 ====
First round
4	(Indonesia) J Christie	21	21
(Canada) B Yang	14	9
(China) Zhao JP	21	21
(China) Weng HY	19	12
5	(Chinese Taipei) Chou T-c	22	14	21
(Hong Kong) Lee C Y	20	21	11
(Chinese Taipei) Wang T-w	21	21
(Republic of Ireland) N Nguyen	18	17

Second round
4	(Indonesia) J Christie	21	15	21
(China) Zhao JP	19	21	12
5	(Chinese Taipei) Chou T-c	18	21	21
(Chinese Taipei) Wang T-w	21	17	10

Quarter-finals
4	(Indonesia) J Christie	21	13	22
5	(Chinese Taipei) Chou T-c	15	21	20

=== Bottom half ===
==== Section 3 ====
First round
(Denmark) A Antonsen	18	21	21
(France) T J Popov	21	19	13
(Hong Kong) Ng K L	13	13
8	(Thailand) K Vitidsarn	21	21
(Denmark) H-K Vittinghus	11
PFR	(Malaysia) Liew D	9^{r}
(Japan) K Naraoka	21	9	7
3	(Singapore) Loh K Y	18	21	21

Second round
(Denmark) A Antonsen	21	12	17
8	(Thailand) K Vitidsarn	11	21	21
(Denmark) H-K Vittinghus	18	17
3	(Singapore) Loh K Y	21	21

Quarter-finals
8	(Thailand) K Vitidsarn	21	21
3	(Singapore) Loh K Y	12	17

==== Section 4 ====
First round
(Thailand) K Wangcharoen	25	11	22
(Japan) K Nishimoto	23	21	20
(China) Lu GZ	21	19	19
6	(Indonesia) A S Ginting	19	21	21
(Malaysia) Ng T Y	19	14
(China) Li SF	21	21
(Indonesia) S H Rhustavito	22	19	12
2	(Malaysia) Lee Z J	20	21	21

Second round
(Thailand) K Wangcharoen	18	10
6	(Indonesia) A S Ginting	21	21
(China) Li SF	21	14	21
2	(Malaysia) Lee Z J	11	21	18

Quarter-finals
6	(Indonesia) A S Ginting	21	17	21
(China) Li SF	11	21	18

== Women's singles ==
=== Seeds ===
1. (Japan) Akane Yamaguchi (final)
2. (South Korea) An Se-young (champion)
3. (China) Chen Yufei (quarter-finals)
4. (China) He Bingjiao (semi-finals)
5. (India) P. V. Sindhu (first round)
6. (Thailand) Ratchanok Intanon (second round)
7. (China) Wang Zhiyi (second round)
8. (Thailand) Pornpawee Chochuwong (quarter-finals)

=== Finals ===
Semi-finals
1	(Japan) Akane Yamaguchi	21	21
(Thailand) Supanida Katethong	17	16
4	(China) He Bingjiao	21	16	16
2	(South Korea) An Se-young	11	21	21

Final
1	(Japan) Akane Yamaguchi	21	16	12
2	(South Korea) An Se-young	15	21	21

=== Top half ===
==== Section 1 ====
First round
1	(Japan) A Yamaguchi	21	21
(Spain) C Azurmendi	7	11
(Chinese Taipei) Pai Y-p	10	16
(China) Han Y	21	21
6	(Thailand) R Intanon	21	21
(Malaysia) Goh J W	13	11
(Japan) N Okuhara	13	18
(Spain) C Marín	21	21

Second round
1	(Japan) A Yamaguchi	21	21
(China) Han Y	14	17
6	(Thailand) R Intanon	16	16
(Spain) C Marín	21	21

Quarter-finals
1	(Japan) A Yamaguchi	21	14	21
(Spain) C Marín	17	21	9

==== Section 2 ====
First round
3	(China) Chen YF	21	22
(Canada) M Li	19	20
(Denmark) M Blichfeldt	17	21	19
(India) S Nehwal	21	12	21
5	(India) P. V. Sindhu	14	20
(Thailand) S Katethong	21	22
(Scotland) K Gilmour	21	21
(Germany) Y Li	17	14

Second round
3	(China) Chen YF	21	21
(India) S Nehwal	9	12
(Thailand) S Katethong	21	21
(Scotland) K Gilmour	17	14

Quarter-finals
3	(China) Chen YF
(Thailand) S Katethong	w	/	o

=== Bottom half ===
==== Section 3 ====
First round
(United States) BW Zhang	21	21
(India) A Kashyap	15	12
(China) Zhang YM	12	21	17
7	(China) Wang ZY	21	19	21
(South Korea) Kim G-e	21	21
(Japan) A Ohori	17	13
(Denmark) L Kjærsfeldt	16	15
4	(China) He BJ	21	21

Second round
(United States) BW Zhang	21	11
7	(China) Wang ZY	17	3^{r}
(South Korea) Kim G-e	18	15
4	(China) He BJ	21	21

Quarter-finals
(United States) BW Zhang	13	19
4	(China) He BJ	21	21

==== Section 4 ====
First round
(Thailand) B Ongbamrungphan	21	21
(India) M Bansod	17	12
(Singapore) Yeo J M	15	8
8	(Thailand) P Chochuwong	21	21
(Indonesia) G M Tunjung	21	21
(Denmark) L Christophersen	17	19
(Chinese Taipei) Hsu W-c	17	9
2	(South Korea) An S-y	21	21

Second round
(Thailand) B Ongbamrungphan	9	21	17
8	(Thailand) P Chochuwong	21	15	21
(Indonesia) G M Tunjung	16	18
2	(South Korea) An S-y	21	21

Quarter-finals
8	(Thailand) P Chochuwong	14	14
2	(South Korea) An S-y	21	21

== Men's doubles ==
=== Seeds ===
1. (Japan) Takuro Hoki / Yugo Kobayashi (first round)
2. (Indonesia) Fajar Alfian / Muhammad Rian Ardianto (semi-finals)
3. (Malaysia) Aaron Chia / Soh Wooi Yik (final)
4. (Indonesia) Mohammad Ahsan / Hendra Setiawan (first round)
5. (India) Satwiksairaj Rankireddy / Chirag Shetty (second round)
6. (Denmark) Kim Astrup / Anders Skaarup Rasmussen (second round)
7. (Malaysia) Ong Yew Sin / Teo Ee Yi (quarter-finals)
8. (Indonesia) Marcus Fernaldi Gideon / Kevin Sanjaya Sukamuljo (quarter-finals)

=== Finals ===
Semi-finals
(South Korea) Kang Min-hyuk (South Korea) Seo Seung-jae	18	19
(China) Liang Weikeng (China) Wang Chang	21	21
3	(Malaysia) Aaron Chia (Malaysia) Soh Wooi Yik	11	21	21
2	(Indonesia) Fajar Alfian (Indonesia) Muhammad Rian Ardianto	21	15	16

Final
(China) Liang Weikeng (China) Wang Chang	14	21	21
3	(Malaysia) Aaron Chia (Malaysia) Soh Wooi Yik	21	19	18

=== Top half ===
==== Section 1 ====
First round
1	(Japan) T Hoki (Japan) Y Kobayashi	13	18
(South Korea) Kang M-h (South Korea) Seo S-j	21	21
(Chinese Taipei) Lu C-y (Chinese Taipei) Yang P-ha	19	21	23
(Scotland) A Dunn (Scotland) A Hall	21	12	21
5	(India) S Rankireddy (India) C Shetty	21	21
PFR	(Scotland) C Grimley (Scotland) M Grimley	13	15
(China) Liu YC (China) Ou XY	21	21
(England) B Lane (England) S Vendy	19	13

Second round
(South Korea) Kang M-h (South Korea) Seo S-j	21	21
(Chinese Taipei) Lu C-y (Chinese Taipei) Yang P-ha	16	12
5	(India) S Rankireddy (India) C Shetty
(China) Liu YC (China) Ou XY	w	/	o

Quarter-finals
(South Korea) Kang M-h (South Korea) Seo S-j	21	21
(China) Liu YC (China) Ou XY	17	17

==== Section 2 ====
First round
4	(Indonesia) M Ahsan (Indonesia) H Setiawan	14	21	21
(China) Liang WK (China) Wang C	21	18	23
(Netherlands) R Jille (Netherlands) T van der Lecq	11	25	9
(India) K P Garaga (India) V G Panjala	21	23	21
8	(Indonesia) M F Gideon (Indonesia) K S Sukamuljo	15	21	21
(Indonesia) L R Carnando (Indonesia) D Marthin	21	17	10
(China) Ren XY (China) Tan Q	21	21
(Malaysia) Goh S F (Malaysia) N Izzuddin	19	17

Second round
(China) Liang WK (China) Wang C	21	21
(India) K P Garaga (India) V G Panjala	14	10
8	(Indonesia) M F Gideon (Indonesia) K S Sukamuljo	16	21	23
(China) Ren XY (China) Tan Q	21	18	21

Quarter-finals
(China) Liang WK (China) Wang C	21	21
8	(Indonesia) M F Gideon (Indonesia) K S Sukamuljo	12	18

=== Bottom half ===
==== Section 3 ====
First round
(France) C Popov (France) T J Popov	27	14
(Thailand) S Jomkoh (Thailand) K Kedren	29	21
(Japan) A Koga (Japan) T Saito	15	15
7	(Malaysia) Ong Y S (Malaysia) Teo E Y	21	21
(Chinese Taipei) Lee J-h (Chinese Taipei) Yang P-hs	21	21
(Japan) K Matsui (Japan) Y Takeuchi	14	13
(Malaysia) Man W C (Malaysia) Tee K W	21	10
3	(Malaysia) A Chia (Malaysia) Soh W Y	23	21

Second round
(Thailand) S Jomkoh (Thailand) K Kedren	16	21	19
7	(Malaysia) Ong Y S (Malaysia) Teo E Y	21	13	21
(Chinese Taipei) Lee J-h (Chinese Taipei) Yang P-hs	21	19	19
3	(Malaysia) A Chia (Malaysia) Soh W Y	15	21	21

Quarter-finals
7	(Malaysia) Ong Y S (Malaysia) Teo E Y	17	11
3	(Malaysia) A Chia (Malaysia) Soh W Y	21	21

==== Section 4 ====
First round
(Germany) M Lamsfuß (Germany) M Seidel	21	21
(South Korea) Ko S-h (South Korea) Shin B-c	13	18
PFR	(France) L Corvée (France) R Labar	10	11
6	(Denmark) K Astrup (Denmark) A S Rasmussen	21	21
(China) He JT (China) Zhou HD	17	16
(Indonesia) M S Fikri (Indonesia) B Maulana	21	21
(South Korea) Choi S-g (South Korea) Kim W-h	17	16
2	(Indonesia) F Alfian (Indonesia) M R Ardianto	21	21

Second round
(Germany) M Lamsfuß (Germany) M Seidel	16	21	21
6	(Denmark) K Astrup (Denmark) A S Rasmussen	21	17	18
(Indonesia) M S Fikri (Indonesia) B Maulana	17	18
2	(Indonesia) F Alfian (Indonesia) M R Ardianto	21	21

Quarter-finals
(Germany) M Lamsfuß (Germany) M Seidel	13	13
2	(Indonesia) F Alfian (Indonesia) M R Ardianto	21	21

== Women's doubles ==
=== Seeds ===
1. (China) Chen Qingchen / Jia Yifan (final)
2. (Japan) Nami Matsuyama / Chiharu Shida (champions)
3. (South Korea) Kim So-yeong / Kong Hee-yong (second round)
4. (South Korea) Jeong Na-eun / Kim Hye-jeong (semi-finals)
5. (Thailand) Jongkolphan Kititharakul / Rawinda Prajongjai (second round)
6. (China) Zhang Shuxian / Zheng Yu (quarter-finals)
7. (South Korea) Lee So-hee / Shin Seung-chan (second round)
8. (Malaysia) Pearly Tan / Thinaah Muralitharan (semi-finals)

=== Finals ===
Semi-finals
1	(China) Chen Qingchen (China) Jia Yifan	21	21
4	(South Korea) Jeong Na-eun (South Korea) Kim Hye-jeong	15	12
8	(Malaysia) Pearly Tan (Malaysia) Thinaah Muralitharan	14	16
2	(Japan) Nami Matsuyama (Japan) Chiharu Shida	21	21

Final
1	(China) Chen Qingchen (China) Jia Yifan
2	(Japan) Nami Matsuyama (Japan) Chiharu Shida	w	/	o

=== Top half ===
==== Section 1 ====
First round
1	(China) Chen QC (China) Jia YF	16	21	21
(Thailand) P Supajirakul (Thailand) S Paewsampran	21	14	16
(Germany) L Efler (Germany) I Lohau	21	21
PFR	(India) S Mishra (India) N. S Reddy	17	19
6	(China) Zhang SX (China) Zheng Y	21	21
PFR	(India) H Manazhiyil (India) A Roy	4	2
(France) M Lambert (France) A Tran	20	21	18
(India) T Jolly (India) G Gopichand	22	17	21

Second round
1	(China) Chen QC (China) Jia YF	21	21
(Germany) L Efler (Germany) I Lohau	8	17
6	(China) Zhang SX (China) Zheng Y	21	21
(India) T Jolly (India) G Gopichand	9	16

Quarter-finals
1	(China) Chen QC (China) Jia YF	21	14	23
6	(China) Zhang SX (China) Zheng Y	12	21	21

==== Section 2 ====
First round
4	(South Korea) Jeong N-e (South Korea) Kim H-j	21	21
PFR	(Hong Kong) Ng T Y (Hong Kong) Tsang H Y	14	9
(China) Li WM (China) Liu XX	21	21
(Malaysia) V Hoo (Malaysia) Lim C S	16	9
5	(Thailand) J Kititharakul (Thailand) R Prajongjai	18	21	21
(Netherlands) D Jille (Netherlands) C Seinen	21	17	16
(Bulgaria) G Stoeva (Bulgaria) S Stoeva	21	21
(England) C Birch (England) L Smith	16	10

Second round
4	(South Korea) Jeong N-e (South Korea) Kim H-j	21	21
(China) Li WM (China) Liu XX	10	15
5	(Thailand) J Kititharakul (Thailand) R Prajongjai	17	15
(Bulgaria) G Stoeva (Bulgaria) S Stoeva	21	21

Quarter-finals
4	(South Korea) Jeong N-e (South Korea) Kim H-j	21	21
(Bulgaria) G Stoeva (Bulgaria) S Stoeva	14	8

=== Bottom half ===
==== Section 3 ====
First round
(Chinese Taipei) Lee C-h (Chinese Taipei) Teng C-h	21	21
(Hong Kong) Yeung N T (Hong Kong) Yeung P L	17	16
(India) A Bhat (India) S Gautam	8	11
8	(Malaysia) P Tan (Malaysia) Thinaah M	21	21
(Japan) R Iwanaga (Japan) K Nakanishi	21	21
(Scotland) J MacPherson (Scotland) C Torrance	11	9
(United States) S Gurazada (United States) I Jaiswal	9	10
3	(South Korea) Kim S-y (South Korea) Kong H-y	21	21

Second round
(Chinese Taipei) Lee C-h (Chinese Taipei) Teng C-h	14	21	6
8	(Malaysia) P Tan (Malaysia) Thinaah M	21	16	21
(Japan) R Iwanaga (Japan) K Nakanishi	21	21
3	(South Korea) Kim S-y (South Korea) Kong H-y	18	19

Quarter-finals
8	(Malaysia) P Tan (Malaysia) Thinaah M	21	21
(Japan) R Iwanaga (Japan) K Nakanishi	13	13

==== Section 4 ====
First round
(Thailand) B Aimsaard (Thailand) N Aimsaard	16	21	21
(Singapore) Jin YJ (Singapore) C Wong	21	17	14
(China) Du Y (China) Xia YT	21	15	16
7	(South Korea) Lee S-h (South Korea) Shin S-c	19	21	21
(Spain) C Azurmendi (Spain) B Corrales	9	15
(Japan) Y Fukushima (Japan) S Hirota	21	21
(South Korea) Baek H-n (South Korea) Lee Y-l	16	17
2	(Japan) N Matsuyama (Japan) C Shida	21	21

Second round
(Thailand) B Aimsaard (Thailand) N Aimsaard	21	21
7	(South Korea) Lee S-h (South Korea) Shin S-c	18	19
(Japan) Y Fukushima (Japan) S Hirota	7	13
2	(Japan) N Matsuyama (Japan) C Shida	21	21

Quarter-finals
(Thailand) B Aimsaard (Thailand) N Aimsaard	16	13
2	(Japan) N Matsuyama (Japan) C Shida	21	21

== Mixed doubles ==
=== Seeds ===
1. (China) Zheng Siwei / Huang Yaqiong (semi-finals)
2. (Thailand) Dechapol Puavaranukroh / Sapsiree Taerattanachai (second round)
3. (Japan) Yuta Watanabe / Arisa Higashino (champions)
4. (China) Wang Yilyu / Huang Dongping (final)
5. (South Korea) Seo Seung-jae / Chae Yoo-jung (quarter-finals)
6. (Malaysia) Tan Kian Meng / Lai Pei Jing (first round)
7. (Hong Kong) Tang Chun Man / Tse Ying Suet (second round)
8. (France) Thom Gicquel / Delphine Delrue (quarter-finals)

=== Finals ===
Semi-finals
1	(China) Zheng Siwei (China) Huang Yaqiong	18	21	14
3	(Japan) Yuta Watanabe (Japan) Arisa Higashino	21	18	21
4	(China) Wang Yilyu (China) Huang Dongping	21	12	21
(South Korea) Kim Won-ho (South Korea) Jeong Na-eun	15	21	19

Final
3	(Japan) Yuta Watanabe (Japan) Arisa Higashino	w	/	o
4	(China) Wang Yilyu (China) Huang Dongping

=== Top half ===
==== Section 1 ====
First round
1	(China) Zheng SW (China) Huang YQ	21	21
(Malaysia) Goh S H (Malaysia) S J Lai	11	7
(Chinese Taipei) Yang P-hs (Chinese Taipei) Hu L-f	14	21	18
(Indonesia) R N Kusharjanto (Indonesia) L A Kusumawati	21	17	21
8	(France) T Gicquel (France) D Delrue	15	21	21
(Hong Kong) Lee C H (Hong Kong) Ng T Y	21	13	18
(Germany) J R Jansen (Germany) L Efler	12	17
(Chinese Taipei) Chang K-c (Chinese Taipei) Lee C-c	21	21

Second round
1	(China) Zheng SW (China) Huang YQ	21	21
(Indonesia) R N Kusharjanto (Indonesia) L A Kusumawati	16	9
8	(France) T Gicquel (France) D Delrue	21	19	21
(Chinese Taipei) Chang K-c (Chinese Taipei) Lee C-c	19	21	17

Quarter-finals
1	(China) Zheng SW (China) Huang YQ	14	21	21
8	(France) T Gicquel (France) D Delrue	21	15	12

==== Section 2 ====
First round
3	(Japan) Y Watanabe (Japan) A Higashino	23	21
(Singapore) T Hee (Singapore) J Tan	21	17
(Japan) Y Kaneko (Japan) M Matsutomo	21	21
(Japan) H Midorikawa (Japan) N Saito	17	7
5	(South Korea) Seo S-j (South Korea) Chae Y-j	21	21
(Thailand) S Jomkoh (Thailand) S Paewsampran	18	13
(India) I Bhatnagar (India) T Crasto	11	12
(Netherlands) R Tabeling (Netherlands) S Piek	21	21

Second round
3	(Japan) Y Watanabe (Japan) A Higashino	21	21
(Japan) Y Kaneko (Japan) M Matsutomo	15	16
5	(South Korea) Seo S-j (South Korea) Chae Y-j	21	21
(Netherlands) R Tabeling (Netherlands) S Piek	16	18

Quarter-finals
3	(Japan) Y Watanabe (Japan) A Higashino	21	21
5	(South Korea) Seo S-j (South Korea) Chae Y-j	15	18

=== Bottom half ===
==== Section 3 ====
First round
(Indonesia) Z J Sumanti (Indonesia) H Julimarbela	10	17
(Denmark) M Christiansen (Denmark) A Bøje	21	21
(Denmark) M Mikkelsen (Denmark) R Søby Hansen	11	13
7	(Hong Kong) Tang C M (Hong Kong) Tse Y S	21	21
(Malaysia) Chen T J (Malaysia) Toh E W	21	12	21
(Malaysia) Hoo P R (Malaysia) Teoh M X	17	21	19
(Indonesia) R Rivaldy (Indonesia) P H Mentari	13	13
4	(China) Wang YL (China) Huang DP	21	21

Second round
(Denmark) M Christiansen (Denmark) A Bøje	21	21
7	(Hong Kong) Tang C M (Hong Kong) Tse Y S	16	18
(Malaysia) Chen T J (Malaysia) Toh E W	21	12
4	(China) Wang YL (China) Huang DP	23	21

Quarter-finals
(Denmark) M Christiansen (Denmark) A Bøje	16	22	12
4	(China) Wang YL (China) Huang DP	21	20	21

==== Section 4 ====
First round
(Germany) M Lamsfuß (Germany) I Lohau	7	15
(Japan) K Yamashita (Japan) N Shinoya	21	21
(Indonesia) D Ferdinansyah (Indonesia) G E Widjaja	21	15	21
6	(Malaysia) Tan K M (Malaysia) Lai P J	11	21	19
(Scotland) A Hall (Scotland) J MacPherson	11	14
(South Korea) Kim W-h (South Korea) Jeong N-e	21	21
(Chinese Taipei) Ye H-w (Chinese Taipei) Lee C-h	12	24
2	(Thailand) D Puavaranukroh (Thailand) S Taerattanachai	21	26

Second round
(Japan) K Yamashita (Japan) N Shinoya	21	21
(Indonesia) D Ferdinansyah (Indonesia) G E Widjaja	14	10
(South Korea) Kim W-h (South Korea) Jeong N-e	14	21	21
2	(Thailand) D Puavaranukroh (Thailand) S Taerattanachai	21	19	17

Quarter-finals
(Japan) K Yamashita (Japan) N Shinoya	19	15
(South Korea) Kim W-h (South Korea) Jeong N-e	21	21

== Controversies ==
=== Food hygiene issues ===
Due to unhygienic food provided by the athletes' hotel, Chinese badminton players Chen Yufei and Wang Zhiyi got gastroenteritis and were forced to pull out from the tournament. Later on, Chinese women's doubles finalist Chen Qingchen and Jia Yifan and mixed doubles finalist Wang Yilyu and Huang Dongping both withdrew from the finals and must hand the titles to Japanese pairs due to similar issues.

Preceded by 2023 Malaysia Open	BWF World Tour; 2023 BWF season	Succeeded by 2023 Indonesia Masters
