= Loh Kean Yew =

Singaporean badminton player

Loh Kean Yew 骆建佑
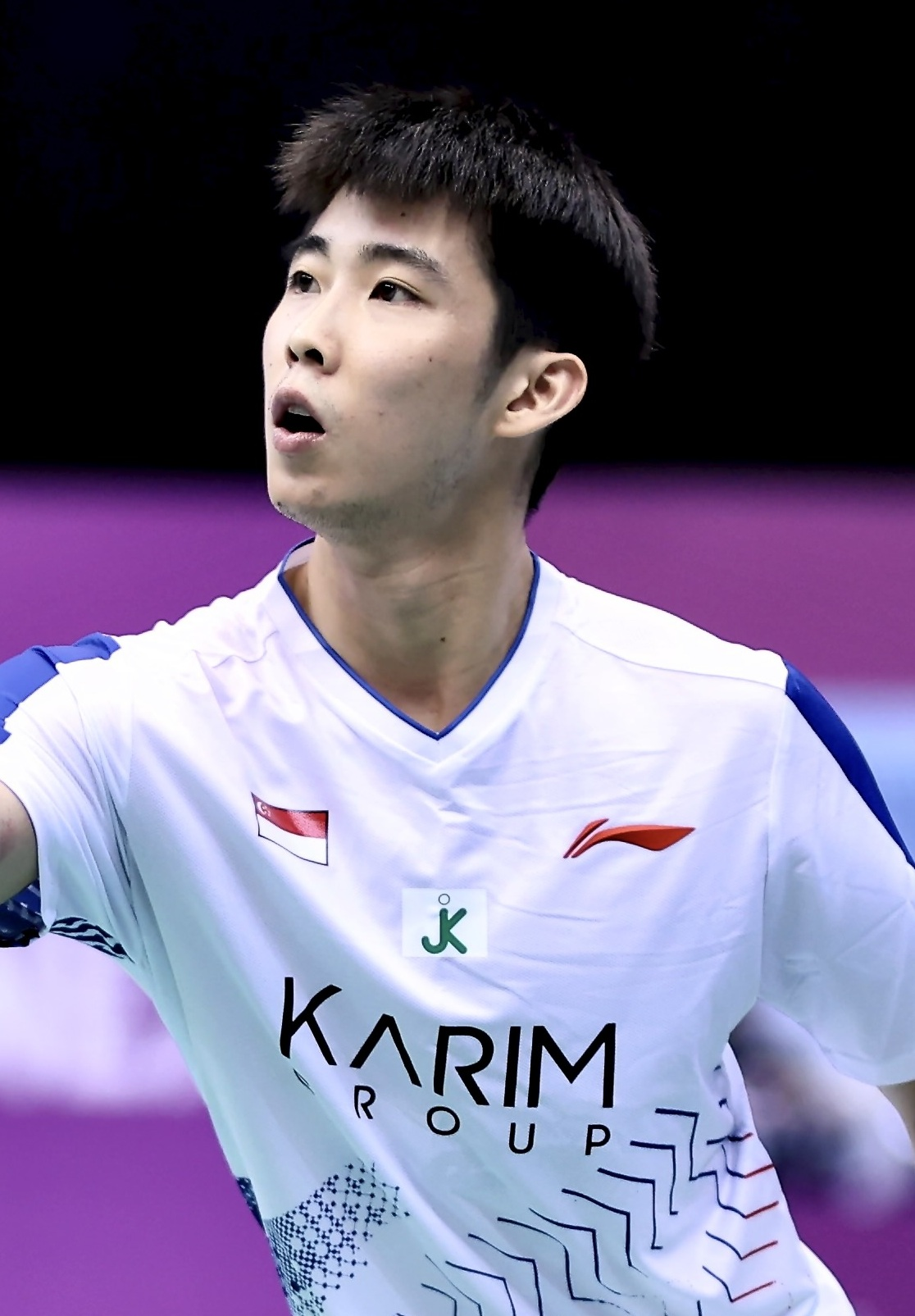
- Loh at the 2025 Taipei Open

Personal information
- Born: 26 June 1997 (age 29) Penang, Malaysia
- Height: 1.75 m (5 ft 9 in)
- Weight: 67 kg (148 lb)

Sport
- Country: Singapore
- Sport: Badminton
- Handedness: Right
- Coached by: Kelvin Ho

Men's singles
- Career record: 278 wins, 166 losses
- Highest ranking: 3 (8 November 2022)
- Current ranking: 12 (17 November 2026)
- BWF profile
Medal record
Men's badminton
Representing Singapore
World Championships
Gold medal – first place	2021 Huelva	Men's singles
Asian Games
Silver medal – second place	2026 Aichi–Nagoya	Men's singles
Commonwealth Games
Bronze medal – third place	2022 Birmingham	Mixed team
Asian Championships
Silver medal – second place	2023 Dubai	Men's singles
Bronze medal – third place	2025 Ningbo	Men's singles
Asia Team Championships
Bronze medal – third place	2022 Selangor	Men's team
SEA Games
Silver medal – second place	2019 Philippines	Men's singles
Silver medal – second place	2021 Vietnam	Men's singles
Bronze medal – third place	2015 Singapore	Men's singles
Bronze medal – third place	2015 Singapore	Men's team
Bronze medal – third place	2017 Kuala Lumpur	Men's team
Bronze medal – third place	2019 Philippines	Men's team
Bronze medal – third place	2021 Vietnam	Men's team
Bronze medal – third place	2023 Cambodia	Men's team
Bronze medal – third place	2025 Thailand	Men's team

Loh Kean Yew (Note: simplified Chinese: 骆建佑; traditional Chinese: 駱建佑; pinyin: Luò Jiànyòu; Pe̍h-ōe-jī: Lo̍h Kiàn-iú) (born 26 June 1997) is a Singaporean badminton player. He is the former men's singles world champion, winning the title at the 2021 BWF World Championships, becoming the first Singaporean to achieve this feat. He is known for his agility, footwork and powerful smashes.

Loh's success as a child in Penang state team saw him receive a scholarship from the Singapore Sports School. He made his international debut for Singapore at the 2015 SEA Games, becoming a Singaporean citizen that same year. He went on to represent Singapore in several international competitions, including the 2020 Tokyo Olympics.

== Early life and education ==
Loh Kean Yew was born on 26 June 1997 in Penang, Malaysia, as the youngest son of four brothers, to his parents Loh Pin Keat and Grace Gan. His mother described him as "very cheeky" when he was young and able to talk his way out of trouble. Loh's elder brother, Kean Hean, is also a member of the Singapore national badminton team.

According to Loh, he began playing badminton at the age of four, at the gate of his house, along with his brothers and his neighbour. He stopped playing the sport at age seven after being looked down on by his seniors, in contrast to media reports which stated that he had been "bullied" as a child. However, he resumed playing badminton at age nine. Within six months, he progressed to join the Penang state team. Loh briefly trained with the Penang Badminton Association (PBA) until the age of 12, at their badminton academy in Ayer Itam. According to the president of the PBA, Loh and his third brother Loh Kean Hean were attending training nine times a week at the prompting of their mother, and they were trained by two Chinese coaches, Li Mu and Chao Yue. Loh won the 2009 National Junior Grand Prix Finals by defeating Malaysia's Lee Zii Jia in the under-12 final.

In 2007, Loh visited Singapore for the first time, as his brother Kean Hean attended a trial at the Singapore Sports School, with Loh being there to help his brother warm up. Kean Hean moved to Singapore in 2009, joining Montfort Secondary School. Meanwhile, Loh visited Singapore again in 2009 for his trial with the Singapore Sports School, where he performed well enough to be offered a place in the Singapore Sports School's Badminton Academy. Loh was also offered a place in Malaysia's Bukit Jalil Sports School but he rejected it for Singapore.

Loh moved to Singapore at the age of 13 to attend the Singapore Sports School's four-year programme from 2010 to 2013, on a scholarship offered by the school. Loh joined the national youth team's training programme, where he was coached by Liu Qingdong, head coach of the youth team, from 2010 to 2015. With Loh's parents remaining in their family home in George Town, they relied on support in Singapore to look after Loh, stemming from sources such as Loh's maternal uncle, an ex-classmate of Loh's father, as well as the family of Kean Hean's doubles partner Terry Hee. Loh said that his initial reaction was anger, but he had no choice because his mother "already bought the tickets". He suffered from homesickness for a period but got better when he called his mother and cried to her, letting out the unhappiness. Loh credited his peers for not judging his accent and allowing him to fit in with them. He also credited the school staff for taking care of him. He had badminton training twice a day at the Singapore Sports School.

After graduating from the Singapore Sports School, Loh continued his education at Republic Polytechnic (RP), studying Sports and Leisure Management. In 2015, Loh officially became a Singaporean citizen. Also that year, after Loh had turned 18, he informed his mother that he would drop out of schooling to become a professional sportsman, as Loh wanted to focus on badminton full-time. His mother said that the family was "shocked", and recounted telling Loh: "I sent him to Singapore to study, but now he wants to give that up to play badminton?" However, the family ultimately "trusted" and "supported" Loh because he was "mature", "disciplined and knew what he wanted to do", said his mother. As such, Loh dropped out of Republic Polytechnic after one year of study.

== Career ==
=== 2012–2013: Senior circuits exposure ===
2012 marked the start of Loh's professional career. At age 15, Loh played in his first senior tournament at the 2012 Chinese Taipei Open in October. He participated in two events, the men's singles and the mixed doubles.

In 2013, he participated in eight more tournaments throughout the year, either in the men's singles discipline, doubles, or both. His best showing was in the singles events where he reached the second round of both the Malaysia Masters and Indonesia Masters.

=== 2014–2020: First World Tour success and Four International titles ===
In 2014, Loh won that year's Singapore International Series tournament, with International Series events being the fourth tier of Badminton World Federation events at the time.

At the age of 17, Loh (world no. 139) represented Singapore at the 2015 SEA Games in the men's singles event and won a bronze after being defeated by Mohamad Arif Abdul Latif in the semi-final. He was also in the men's team in 2015, 2017, and 2019, where he won bronzes in all three editions. He also won the Singapore and Malaysia International tournaments in 2017.

Loh served his National Service (NS) for the Singapore Armed Forces (SAF) from 2016 to 2018, eventually earning the rank of corporal first class (CFC). During his service, he continued to train and play badminton for the Singapore Armed Forces Sports Association (SAFSA), as well as representing his country at various major events such as the 2017 SEA Games and the 2018 Commonwealth Games. In 2017, he stated that his goal is to eventually win an Olympic gold medal for Singapore in badminton. In 2018, he received the best sportsman award from SAFSA.

At the 2018 Commonwealth Games in Gold Coast, Loh lost to Lee Chong Wei in the quarter-finals in the men's singles event, and lost 3–0 in the bronze medal playoff to England in the Mixed team event. Loh lost to Rajiv Ouseph in the second match, losing 22–20, 15–21, 23–25 in three games. Thereafter, he won his fourth International Series/Challenge title, the 2018 Mongolia International tournament. That same year, Loh briefly joined the Langhøj Badminton Club in Denmark for 3 months.

During the Thailand Masters in 2019, as a qualifier, Loh won against China's Zhou Zeqi, Zhao Junpeng, and Chinese Taipei's Wang Tzu-wei before advancing to the semifinals. He took the semifinals against Brice Leverdez in an eventual 2–1 win. He played against China's Lin Dan in the final and won with a score of 21–19, 21–18.

At Loh's first World Championships, he lost to Chinese Taipei's Chou Tien-chen in the round of 16, losing 13–21, 21–18, 17–21 in three games.

Loh won the men's singles silver medal in the 2019 SEA Games, losing in the final match against Lee Zii Jia of Malaysia. Loh also won his first National Championships title that year, defeating compatriot Lee Wei Hong in the final.

=== 2021: Rise to World Champion ===
Loh qualified for the 2020 Summer Olympics after placing 18th in the Race to Tokyo men's singles rankings. He was the flag bearer for Singapore during the Parade of Nations. In July 2021, Loh was eliminated from the Olympics in the group stage; he won a match against Aram Mahmoud in straight games, and lost to Jonatan Christie, the seventh seed, in a closely-contested rubber game.

From August 2021, Loh attended a one-month training camp in Dubai arranged by Denmark's Olympic badminton champion Viktor Axelsen, joining Axelsen and fellow players Toby Penty from England, Brian Yang from Canada, Felix Burestedt from Sweden, Lakshya Sen from India, as well as teenagers Axel Parkhoi and Marcus Viscovich from Denmark. There were 12 training sessions per week, with a training style similar to interval training with 90-second drills, said Loh. Loh followed this with three weeks of training with France's national badminton squad at INSEP near Paris.

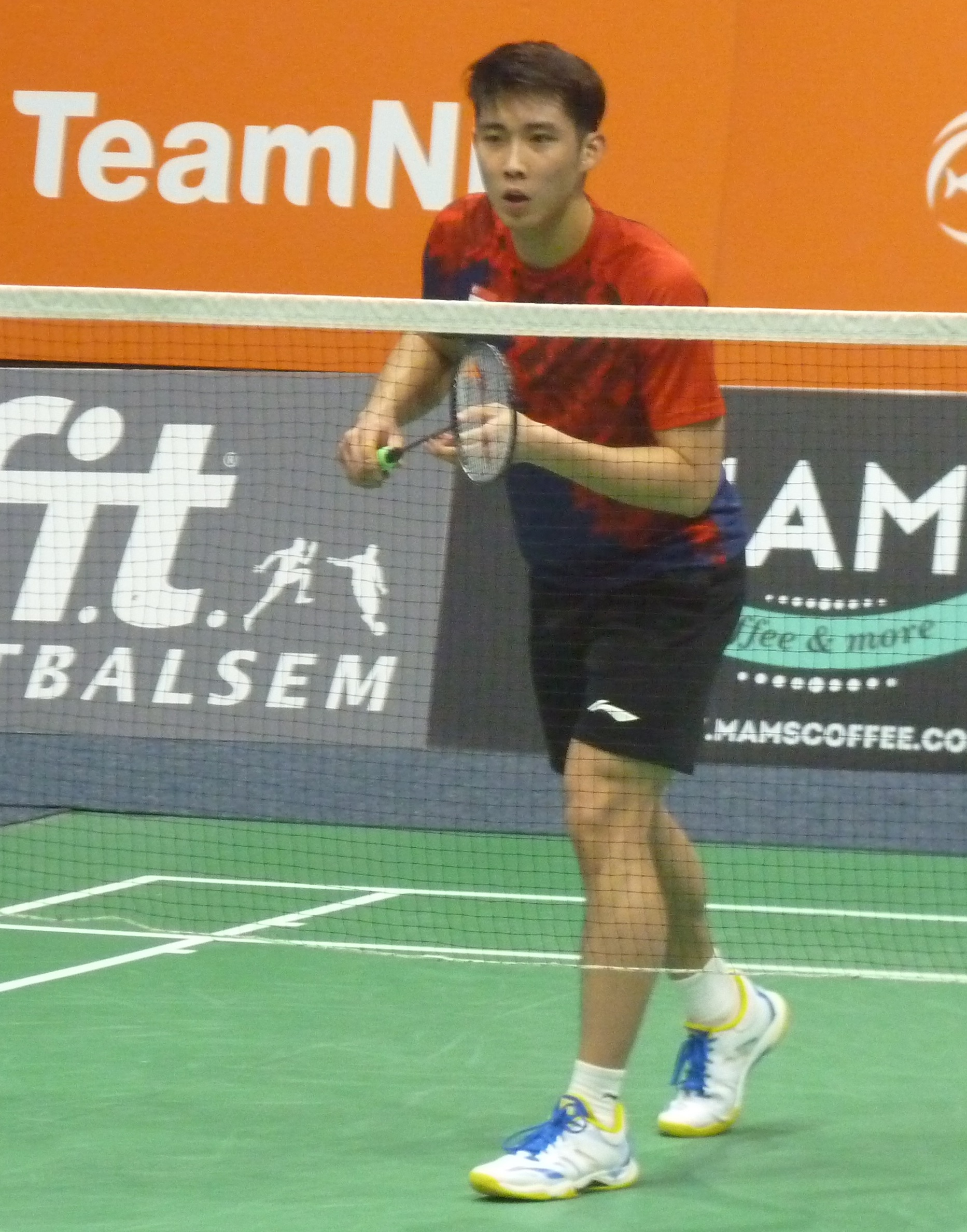
Loh Kean Yew at the 2021 Dutch Open

In mid-October 2021, Loh (world no. 41) took part in the Dutch Open as the second seed. Loh won the tournament by prevailing in the finals 21–12, 21–16 over top seed Lakshya Sen (world no. 25), Loh's former training partner. It was Loh's first tournament victory since 2019; the win netted him S$1,900.

In early November 2021, Loh (world no. 39) won the 2021 Hylo Open in Saarbrücken, Germany, which was the first time he won a Super 500 event (the fourth-highest tier of the BWF World Tour). The unseeded Loh defeated top seed Chou Tien-chen (world no. 4), in the first round 21–18, 21–13. After dispatching France's Toma Junior Popov (world no. 35) and Denmark's Rasmus Gemke (world no. 13), Loh then defeated Lakshya Sen in the semi-finals 21–18, 21–12. In the finals, Loh again defeated Lee Zii Jia (world no. 8), this time with a score of 19–21, 21–13, 17–12 when Lee retired due to injury. Loh won S$32,400 in prize money as a result.

In mid-November 2021, Loh (world no. 30) took part in the 2021 Indonesia Masters, where he defeated Wang Tzu-wei (world no. 11), in the first round, but lost in the next round to Wang's compatriot Chou Tien-chen 10–21, 12–21. In late November 2021, Loh participated in the 2021 Indonesia Open, a Super 1000 tournament. In the round of 16, Loh defeated the defending 2-time world champion Kento Momota (world no. 1), from Japan, with a score of 21–7, 17–21, 21–19. Subsequent wins over Danish players Hans-Kristian Vittinghus (world no. 21) and Rasmus Gemke sent Loh into the finals, where Loh lost to Viktor Axelsen 13–21, 21–9, 13–21. His run was the best performance by a Singaporean male shuttler since Ronald Susilo's singles win at the 2004 Japan Open, a Super 750 tournament. However, the loss meant that Loh failed to qualify for the 2021 BWF World Tour Finals.

==== 2021 BWF World Championships ====
In the 2021 BWF World Championships men's singles tournament in Huelva, Spain, the unseeded Loh (world no. 22) beat reigning Olympic champion and second seed Viktor Axelsen (world no. 1) in the first round with a score of 14–21, 21–9, 21–6 on 14 December. This was Loh's first victory over his former training partner. In the second and third rounds, Loh breezed past Austria's Luka Wraber (world no. 93) 21–4, 21–8, and Thailand's Kantaphon Wangcharoen (world no. 20), the sixteenth seed, 21–4, 21–7. In the quarter-finals, Loh defeated India's Prannoy H. S. (world no. 32) 21–14, 21–12, his first victory against Prannoy after two previous losses. Thus, Loh qualified for the semi-finals and guaranteed a medal at the World Championships, a feat never achieved before by any Singaporean. While playing against Prannoy, Loh sprained his right ankle.

In the semi-finals on 18 December, Loh defeated the third seed, Denmark's Anders Antonsen (world no. 3) 23–21, 21–14 to qualify for the finals. After the semi-final match, Loh's right ankle injury had deteriorated to the point that he could not walk and required a wheelchair. Loh later said that his physiotherapist (Ho Jiaying) worked on his foot from 10:30 pm to 1:30 am to ensure that he could walk again. In the finals, Loh further made Singaporean history by winning the 2021 BWF World Championships, defeating the twelfth seed, India's Srikanth Kidambi (world no. 14) in a 43-minute match with a score of 21–15, 22–20. After the win, Loh credited people from the Singapore Badminton Association, Sport Singapore, Singapore Sport Institute, and "many others" for help and support during his journey. His return to Singapore's Changi Airport was greeted with a water salute at the tarmac, similar to Joseph Schooling after he had won a gold medal at the 2016 Summer Olympics in swimming.

=== 2022: Commonwealth and Badminton Asia Team Bronzes ===
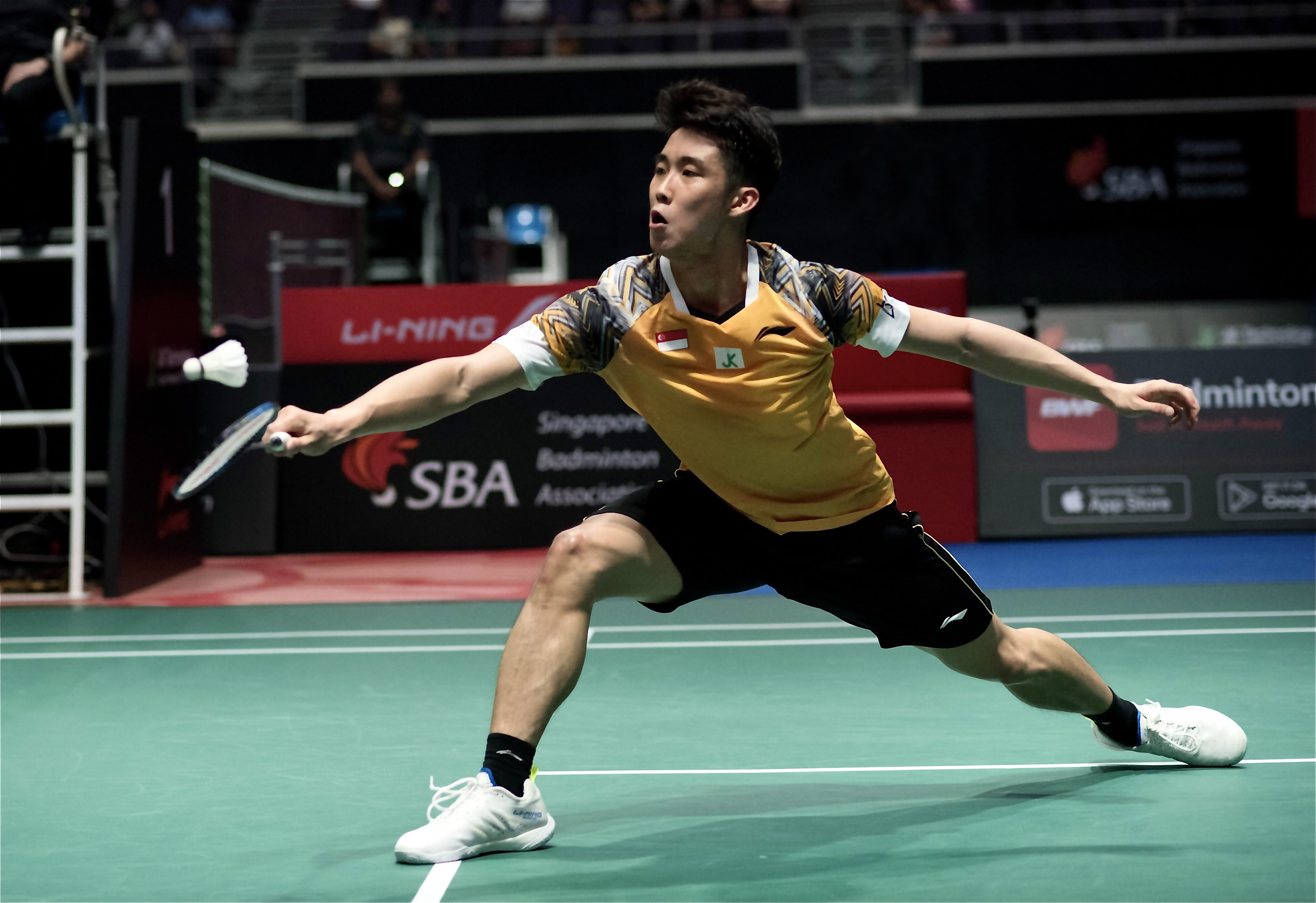
Loh at the 2022 Singapore Open

Loh started the season with a defeat in the final of the India Open to Lakshya Sen in straight games, with a score of 22–24, 17–21. In February, he won a historic bronze with the Singapore men's team at the Badminton Asia Team Championships, the first in the nation's history. In the process, he booked a spot in the Thomas Cup to be held in May. Loh then fell in the first rounds of the German and All England Open, where he lost to Brian Yang and Anders Antonsen respectively, both in 3 games. He later tested positive for COVID-19 while in England, and subsequently withdrew from the Swiss Open, Korea Open, and the Korea Masters, the latter two of which he chose to withdraw since he did not get a chance to train in March due to COVID-19. In his first Thomas Cup appearance, Loh played well, winning all his matches as the first singles, beating Indonesia's Anthony Sinisuka Ginting (21–13, 21–14), South Korea's Heo Kwang-hee (21–14, 21–12) and Thailand's Khosit Phetpradab (21–15, 21–18) in straight sets to earn the points for Singapore in every series. However, it turned out to be futile as Singapore went on to lose in all three series thus missing out on a place in the knockout round.

At the 2021 SEA Games in Vietnam, Loh entered the men's team event, playing the first singles for Singapore. Singapore then ended up losing 2–3 to Malaysia in the semifinals despite having a 2–0 lead, thus clinching a bronze. Later in the men's singles event, Loh was the number 1 seed. He ended up losing in the final to the number 2 seed and world number 18 Kunlavut Vitidsarn in straight sets, 13–21, 13–21. He, therefore, had to settle for the silver medal again. After the match, Loh stated that his form was "second-best" on that day and that he "could have done better".

At the 2022 Indonesia Masters, Loh, the 8th seed, won against Toma Jr Popov, Chico Aura Dwi Wardoyo, and Lu Guangzu to reach the semi-finals of the tournament, meeting the 3rd seed and world number 4 Chou Tien-chen. Loh lost the match in a closely-contested rubber set match, 16–21, 21–8, 19–21 in an hour and ten minutes, losing 2 crucial points at 19-all, ending his run at the tournament. Loh then rose back to his then career-best ranking of 9th place the next week, overtaking India's Lakshya Sen.

In early August, Loh was part of the Singaporean team who played at the Mixed Team event at the Commonwealth Games. In the group stage, Loh played against Mauritius' Julien Paul, winning in two straight games, 21–10, 21–12. Loh was rested against Barbados and went on to beat England's Toby Penty, beating him in two straight sets, 21–12, 21–12, contributing to Singapore's 4–1 win over England. Singapore topped Group B, earning the 4th seeded position. In the quarterfinals, Singapore won 3–0 against Scotland. Loh played against Callum Smith, winning 21–8, 21–5 in straight sets. Singapore met second seeds India in the semi-final. Loh lost to Lakshya Sen in the tie decider, losing 18–21, 15–21. Singapore lost 0–3 overall. In the bronze medal playoff, Singapore was playing against England. Despite beating Penty convincingly in the Group tie 4 days earlier, Loh struggled against the 54th-ranked Englishman, winning the 3-set match, 23–25, 21–11, 25–23, taking 5 match points to secure the point for Singapore. Singapore eventually won 3–0 and won the Mixed team bronze medal.

In late August, Loh, the 8th seed, crashed out at the quarterfinal stage at the World Championships held in Tokyo, losing 12–21, 21–17, 8–21 to three-time World Junior champion and 16th seed Kunlavut Vitidsarn in an hour and five minutes, failing to defend his world title from the previous world championships in Huelva.

In the first week of October, Loh rose to his then career-rank high of 5, replacing Kento Momota, who fell 2 spots after an update of ranking points. This made Loh the first men's singles player from Singapore to reach the top 5, the closest player prior to this achievement being Ronald Susilo who achieved a career high of 6th in 2004. In mid-October, at the Denmark Open, Loh defeated number 1 seed and training partner Viktor Axelsen in the quarterfinals, winning 21–17, 21–10 in 30 minutes, ending Axelsen's 39 match-winning streak he held since the All England Open. However, Loh lost in the semi-finals to Malaysia's Lee Zii Jia in straight games the next day, losing 18–21, 15–21 in 39 minutes.

In early November, Loh participated in the Hylo Open as the number 4 seed. After defeating Shi Yuqi and Shesar Hiren Rhustavito in the first and second round, Loh crashed out to 5th seed and eventual winner Anthony Sinisuka Ginting in the quarterfinals, losing in straight games, 13–21, 14–21. After the tournament concluded, Loh rose 2 spots to his new career-high ranking of 3rd, replacing Anders Antonsen who fell to 5th after an update of ranking points.

Loh managed to gain enough ranking points to qualify for the 2022 BWF World Tour Finals held in Bangkok next month, becoming the first male player from Singapore to ever qualify for the season-ending final.

In December, at the final tournament of the year, the World Tour Finals, Loh was drawn into Group B with Chou Tien-chen, Anthony Sinisuka Ginting, and Jonatan Christie. In his first group stage encounter with Chou Tien-chen, Loh defeated him in straight games, 21–15, 21–17. In his second encounter with Jonatan Christie, Loh lost in three games, 21–16, 20–22, 10–21, failing to convert his 2 match points in the second set. In his final group encounter with Anthony Sinisuka Ginting, Loh lost in straight games, 12–21, 21–23. Loh placed 3rd in the group and did not progress to the semi-finals knockout stage.

=== 2023: Asia Championships silver, Korea Open Finalist ===
Loh had a mixed 2023 BWF season, showing flashes of brilliance but also struggling with consistency in major tournaments. His best performance came at the Asia Championships, where Loh made it to his first final since the 2021 SEA Games. In the final, he lost to Anthony Sinisuka Ginting in straight games. At the Korea Open, he finished runner-up to Anders Antonsen, marking his second finals appearance of the season. He also reached the semi-finals at the French Open and made quarter-final runs at the Denmark Open, China Open and India Open.

At the 2023 BWF World Championships, Loh reached the round of 16, a respectable finish, though short of his 2021 title-winning performance. His campaign at the Asian Games was less successful, with an early exit in both the individual and team events. Additionally, he represented Singapore at the Sudirman Cup and Badminton Asia Mixed Team Championships, contributing to the national squad’s efforts.

However, Loh faced several early-round exits throughout the season, bowing out in the first round at major events such as the All England Open, Japan Open and China Masters. His struggles with consistency were evident, as he was unable to string together deep runs across multiple tournaments.

=== 2024: Ending the title drought, Olympic Quarter-Finalist ===
Since winning the World Championship in 2021, Loh endured a prolonged title drought, despite reaching five tournament finals. His breakthrough finally came in March, when he clinched the Madrid Spain Masters title, ending an 833-day wait for victory. He also secured a runner-up finish at the Thailand Masters, adding another podium to his season. Additionally, his quarter-final appearances at the French Open, Singapore Open, Denmark Open, and Indonesia Masters highlighted his competitive form throughout the year.

At the Badminton Asia Championships 2024, Loh crashed out in the first round, failing to repeat his 2023 run where he reached the final. His loss to Japan’s 12th-ranked Kenta Nishimoto also came just 10 days after his 2024 Spain Masters win.

At the Paris 2024 Olympics, Loh impresses, advancing to the quarter-finals after a series of strong performances. Loh breezed through the group stage, easing past the Czech Republic's Jan Louda, El Salvador's Uriel Canjura and China's world number 6 Li Shifeng all in straight games to book a spot in the quarterfinals. This made him the first Singaporean men's singles player to reach the quarterfinals at an Olympics since Ronald Susilo in 2004. Loh unfortunately lost the quarterfinal to the eventual Olympic gold medalist and world number 2, Viktor Axelsen. He was outclassed in straight sets, 21–9, 21–17 in just 49 minutes.

Despite these strong showings, Loh struggled with consistency throughout the season, suffering multiple first-round exits, including early departures at the Malaysia Open, China Masters, Hong Kong Open, and Japan Open.

=== First title of 2025 ===
Loh's performance improved in 2025. He reached the final of the German Open in March, but lost to two-time Olympic champion Viktor Axelsen. At the Badminton Asia Championships 2025, despite eliminated the top seed Shi Yu Qi earlier, Loh fell to Thailand's Kunlavut Vitidsarn, taking home bronze in men's singles. At the 2025 Taipei Open, Loh won his first title in 14 months by defeating home favourite and top seed, Chou Tien-chen in the final.

=== 2026: Historic Asian Games Silver and Singapore Open Super 750 Finalist ===
Loh began his 2026 season on the BWF World Tour with a semi-final run at the India Open Super 750, where he was defeated by Jonatan Christie. At the Indonesia Masters Super 500, he reached the semi-final but fell to Panitchaphon Teeraratsakul in straight games.

In May, Loh produced a standout performance on home soil at the Singapore Open Super 750. Overcoming a tough draw, he defeated Kidambi Srikanth, H.S. Prannoy, Chi Yu-jen, and Koki Watanabe to become the first local men's singles player to reach the final of the tournament in over six decades. In the championship match on 31 May, he faced French prodigy Alex Lanier. Loh claimed the opening set but eventually succumbed 21–17, 15–21, 14–21, finishing as the runner-up.

At the 2026 BWF World Championships held in August, Loh reached the round of 16 before falling to Victor Lai.

In late September, Loh represented Singapore at the 2026 Asian Games held in Aichi-Nagoya, Japan. In the men's singles event, he staged a remarkable run by defeating world No. 1 Jonatan Christie in the quarter-finals to assure Singapore of its first-ever Asian Games men's singles medal. He defeated Yoo Tae-bin in the semi-final to become the first Singaporean to reach an Asian Games badminton final. On 29 September, Loh faced 2023 world champion and olympic silver medalist Kunlavut Vitidsarn in the gold medal match at the Ichinomiya City Municipal Gymnasium. He was defeated 12–21, 16–21, earning a historic silver medal—Singapore's highest-ever finish in Asian Games badminton men's singles.

== Personal life ==
Loh's initials, LKY, has been noted by Singaporeans as being identical to Lee Kuan Yew, Singapore's first prime minister and its founding father. Loh himself responded to this observation, stating while laughing during an interview, that "My name not I choose one. I think it's just a coincidence. Just nice [sic]!"

In 2022, Loh proposed to his girlfriend at Marina Bay Sands in Singapore and they registered their marriage in 2023. They have one child, a son who was born in July 2024.

== Awards and nominations ==
Loh was nominated for the following lists and awards :

- Received the 2020 Meritorious Award from the Singapore National Olympic Committee (SNOC)
- Won The Straits Times' Athlete of the Year 2021
- Included in the Forbes 30 under 30 Asia 2022 list in the Entertainment and Sports category
- Won the SNOC Sportsman of the Year 2021
- Nominated for BWF Male Player of the Year Award for 2021/2022 season

== Achievements ==
=== BWF World Championships ===
Men's singles
Year	Venue	Opponent	Score	Result	Ref.
2021	Palacio de los Deportes Carolina Marín; Huelva, Spain	(India) Srikanth Kidambi	21–15, 22–20	Gold	

=== Asian Games ===
Men's singles
Year	Venue	Opponent	Score	Result	Ref.
2026	Ichinomiya City Municipal Gymnasium; Ichinomiya, Japan	(Thailand) Kunlavut Vitidsarn	12–21, 16–21	Silver	

=== Asian Championships ===
Men's singles
Year	Venue	Opponent	Score	Result	Ref.
2023	Sheikh Rashid Bin Hamdan Indoor Hall; Dubai, United Arab Emirates	(Indonesia) Anthony Sinisuka Ginting	12–21, 8–21	Silver	
2025	Ningbo Olympic Sports Center Gymnasium; Ningbo, China	(Thailand) Kunlavut Vitidsarn	21–23, 10–21	Bronze	

=== SEA Games ===
Men's singles
Year	Venue	Opponent	Score	Result	Ref.
2015	Singapore Indoor Stadium; Singapore	(Malaysia) Mohamad Arif Abdul Latif	20–22, 15–21	Bronze	
2019	Muntinlupa Sports Complex; Metro Manila, Philippines	(Malaysia) Lee Zii Jia	18–21, 18–21	Silver	
2021	Bac Giang Gymnasium; Bắc Giang, Vietnam	(Thailand) Kunlavut Vitidsarn	13–21, 13–21	Silver	

=== BWF World Tour (4 titles, 8 runners-up) ===
The BWF World Tour, which was announced on 19 March 2017 and implemented in 2018, is a series of elite badminton tournaments sanctioned by the Badminton World Federation (BWF). The BWF World Tour is divided into levels of World Tour Finals, Super 1000, Super 750, Super 500, Super 300, and the BWF Tour Super 100.

Men's singles
Year	Tournament	Level	Opponent	Score	Result	Ref.
2019	Thailand Masters	Super 300	(China) Lin Dan	21–19, 21–18	(gold) Winner	
2019	Russian Open	Super 100	(Indonesia) Shesar Hiren Rhustavito	17–21, 19–21	(silver) Runner-up	
2019	Hyderabad Open	Super 100	(India) Sourabh Verma	13–21, 21–14, 16–21	(silver) Runner-up	
2021	Hylo Open	Super 500	(Malaysia) Lee Zii Jia	19–21, 21–13, 17–12^{r}	(gold) Winner	
2021	Indonesia Open	Super 1000	(Denmark) Viktor Axelsen	13–21, 21–9, 13–21	(silver) Runner-up	
2022	India Open	Super 500	(India) Lakshya Sen	22–24, 17–21	(silver) Runner-up	
2023	Korea Open	Super 500	(Denmark) Anders Antonsen	21–11, 11–21, 19–21	(silver) Runner-up	
2024	Thailand Masters	Super 300	(Chinese Taipei) Chou Tien-chen	16–21, 21–6, 16–21	(silver) Runner-up	
2024	Spain Masters	Super 300	(France) Toma Junior Popov	21–11, 15–21, 22–20	(gold) Winner	
2025	German Open	Super 300	(Denmark) Viktor Axelsen	19–21, 18–21	(silver) Runner-up	
2025	Taipei Open	Super 300	(Chinese Taipei) Chou Tien-chen	21–14, 15–21, 22–20	(gold) Winner	
2026	Singapore Open	Super 750	(France) Alex Lanier	21–17, 15–21, 14–21	(silver) Runner-up	

=== BWF International Challenge/Series (5 titles, 2 runners-up) ===
Men's singles
Year	Tournament	Opponent	Score	Result	Ref.
2014	Singapore International	(Thailand) Kantaphon Wangcharoen	19–21, 21–14, 11–1 retired	(gold) Winner	
2017	Malaysia International	(Malaysia) Cheam June Wei	21–19, 21–14	(gold) Winner	
2017	Singapore International	(Singapore) Ryan Ng	21–15, 21–15	(gold) Winner	
2018	Mongolia International	(Indonesia) Andre Marteen	15–21, 21–9, 24–22	(gold) Winner	
2018	South Australia International	(Japan) Yu Igarashi	19–21, 24–22, 11–21	(silver) Runner-up	
2019	Swedish Open	(Japan) Minoru Koga	11–21, 15–21	(silver) Runner-up	
2021	Dutch Open	(India) Lakshya Sen	21–12, 21–16	(gold) Winner	

BWF International Challenge tournament
BWF International Series tournament

== Performance timeline ==
Key

W	Won	F	Finalist	SF	Semi-finalist
QF	Quarter-finalist	#R	Rounds 4, 3, 2, 1	RR	Round-robin stage
Q#	Qualification round	A	Absent	w/d	Withdrew
G	Gold	S	Silver	B	Bronze
NH	Not held	N/A	Not applicable	DNQ	Did not qualify

=== National team ===
- Junior level

Team events	2015	Ref
Asian Junior Championships	RR	
World Junior Championships	11th	

- Senior level

Team events	2015	2016	2017	2018	2019	2020	2021	2022	2023	2024	2025	2026	Ref
SEA Games	B	NH	B	NH	B	NH	B	NH	B	NH	B	NH	
Asia Team Championships	NH	RR	NH	RR	NH	RR	NH	B	NH	RR	NH	RR	
Asian Games	NH			DNQ	NH			1R	NH			DNQ	
Commonwealth Games	NH			4th	NH			B	NH				
Thomas Cup	NH	DNQ	NH	DNQ	NH	DNQ	NH	13th	NH	DNQ	NH	DNQ	
Sudirman Cup	16th	NH	14th	NH	17th	NH	DNQ	NH	10th	NH	DNQ	NH	

=== Individual competitions ===
==== Junior level ====
===== Boys' doubles =====
Event	2015	Ref
Asian Junior Championships	3R	

===== Boys' singles =====
Event	2015	Ref
Asian Junior Championships	3R	
World Junior Championships	QF	

==== Senior level ====
Events	2015	2016	2017	2018	2019	2020	2021	2022	2023	2024	2025	2026	Ref
SEA Games	B	NH	QF	NH	S	NH	S	NH	A	NH	QF	NH	
Asian Championships	A	1R	A		1R	NH		QF	S	1R	B	QF	
Asian Games	NH			A	NH			2R	NH			S	
Commonwealth Games	NH			QF	NH			QF	NH				
World Championships	DNQ	NH	DNQ		3R	NH	G	QF	3R	NH	QF	3R	
Olympic Games	NH	DNQ	NH			RR	NH			QF	NH		

Tournament	BWF Superseries / Grand Prix						BWF World Tour									Best	Ref
Tournament	2012	2013	2014	2015	2016	2017	2018	2019	2020	2021	2022	2023	2024	2025	2026	Best	Ref
Malaysia Open	A								NH		1R	QF	1R	1R	1R	QF ('23)	
India Open	A								NH		F	QF	A	QF	SF	F ('22)	
Indonesia Masters	A	2R	2R	2R	A	NH	A		2R	2R	SF	2R	QF	1R	SF	SF ('22, '26)	
Thailand Masters	NH				1R	A		W	A	NH		A	F	A	w/d	W ('19)	
German Open	A							Q1	NH		1R	2R	A	F	A	F ('25)	
All England Open	A										1R	1R	2R	QF	2R	QF ('25)	
Swiss Open	A												1R	A	1R	1R ('24, '26)	
Orléans Masters	NA						A		NH	A				1R	A	1R ('25)	
Thailand Open	A	Q2	NH	A					1R	NH	A		1R	SF	1R	SF ('25)	
Thailand Open	A	Q2	NH	A					1R	NH	A		1R	SF	1R	SF ('25)	
Malaysia Masters	A	2R	A	1R	A				2R	NH	A	1R	1R	A		2R ('13, '20)	
Singapore Open	A	Q1	Q2	Q1 (MD)	Q1	A	2R	Q1	NH		SF	2R	QF	QF	F	F ('26)	
Indonesia Open	A								NH	F	QF	2R	1R	2R	1R	F ('21)	
Australian Open	A							2R	NH		QF	1R	2R	w/d	w/d	QF ('22)	
Japan Open	A								NH		2R	1R	1R	A	1R	2R ('22)	
China Open	A								NH			QF	2R	A	2R	QF ('23)	
Taipei Open	2R	1R	A	1R	A	1R	A	2R	NH		A			W	A	W ('25)	
China Masters	A				1R	A		1R	NH			1R	1R	1R	2R	2R ('26)	
Vietnam Open	A		2R	A	3R	A			NH		A					3R ('16)	
Denmark Open	A									1R	SF	QF	QF	1R	A	SF ('22)	
French Open	A									2R	QF	SF	QF	1R	A	SF ('23)	
Hylo Open	A						2R	A		W	QF	A		2R	A	W ('21)	
Korea Open	A								NH		w/d	F	A	QF	A	F ('23)	
Japan Masters	NH											1R	1R	QF	A	QF ('25)	
Hong Kong Open	A								NH			1R	1R	QF	QF	QF ('25, '26)	
Superseries / World Tour Finals	DNQ										RR	DNQ				RR ('22)	
Chinese Taipei Masters	NH			QF	A	NH										QF ('15)	
New Zealand Open	NH	A						1R	NH							1R ('19)	
Spain Masters	NH						A	QF	1R	A	NH	A	W	NH		W ('24)	
Year-end ranking	367	257	178	146	164	232	125	29	38	15	3	10	13	10		3	
Tournament	2012	2013	2014	2015	2016	2017	2018	2019	2020	2021	2022	2023	2024	2025	2026	Best	Ref

== Record against selected opponents ==
Record against Year-end Finals finalists, World Championships semi-finalists, and Olympic quarter-finalists. Accurate as of 6 October 2026.

Player	Matches	Win	Lost	Diff.
(Canada) Victor Lai	2	0	2	–2
(China) Lin Dan	1	1	0	+1
(China) Shi Yuqi	8	4	4	0
(China) Zhao Junpeng	6	4	2	+2
(Chinese Taipei) Chou Tien-chen	11	5	6	–1
(Denmark) Viktor Axelsen	13	2	11	–9
(Denmark) Anders Antonsen	8	4	4	0
(Denmark) Hans-Kristian Vittinghus	2	2	0	+2
(Denmark) Jan Ø. Jørgensen	1	1	0	+1
(England) Rajiv Ouseph	2	0	2	–2
(France) Alex Lanier	4	1	3	–2
(France) Christo Popov	8	3	5	–2
(Guatemala) Kevin Cordón	1	1	0	+1
(India) Srikanth Kidambi	6	4	2	+2
(India) Lakshya Sen	12	5	7	–2

Player	Matches	Win	Lost	Diff.
(India) Parupalli Kashyap	3	3	0	+3
(India) Prannoy H. S.	8	4	4	0
(Indonesia) Anthony Sinisuka Ginting	9	3	6	–3
(Indonesia) Sony Dwi Kuncoro	3	1	2	–1
(Indonesia) Tommy Sugiarto	2	1	1	0
(Japan) Kento Momota	3	1	2	–1
(Japan) Kodai Naraoka	8	8	0	+8
(Malaysia) Lee Chong Wei	1	0	1	–1
(Malaysia) Lee Zii Jia	8	2	6	–4
(South Korea) Lee Hyun-il	2	0	2	–2
(South Korea) Heo Kwang-hee	3	3	0	+3
(Thailand) Kunlavut Vitidsarn	11	2	9	–7
(Thailand) Kantaphon Wangcharoen	3	3	0	+3
(Vietnam) Nguyễn Tiến Minh	3	2	1	+1

== See also ==
- List of Singapore world champions in sports
- Sport in Singapore

== Notes ==
Olympic Games
Preceded by Derek Wong	Flagbearer for Singapore; With Yu Mengyu; Tokyo 2020	Succeeded by Ryan Lo; Shanti Pereira
