= Chong Wei Feng =

Malaysian badminton player (born 1987)

Chong Wei Feng 张崴烽
Personal information
- Born: 26 May 1987 (age 39) Sungai Petani, Kedah, Malaysia
- Height: 1.70 m (5 ft 7 in)

Sport
- Country: Malaysia
- Sport: Badminton
- Handedness: Left

Men's singles
- Highest ranking: 12 (5 September 2013)
Medal record
Men's badminton
Representing Malaysia
Thomas Cup
Silver medal – second place	2014 New Delhi	Men's team
Bronze medal – third place	2016 Kunshan	Men's team
Commonwealth Games
Gold medal – first place	2014 Glasgow	Mixed team
Asian Games
Bronze medal – third place	2014 Incheon	Men's team
Asian Championships
Bronze medal – third place	2013 Taipei	Men's singles
Southeast Asian Games
Gold medal – first place	2015 Singapore	Men's singles
Silver medal – second place	2011 Jakarta–Palembang	Men's team
Bronze medal – third place	2015 Singapore	Men's team
Asian Junior Championships
Bronze medal – third place	2004 Hwacheon	Boys' team
Bronze medal – third place	2005 Jakarta	Boys' team

Chong Wei Feng
- Traditional Chinese: 張維峰
- Simplified Chinese: 张维峰
Transcriptions
Standard Mandarin
- Hanyu Pinyin: Zhāng Wéifēng

Chong Wei Feng (born 26 May 1987) is a Malaysian retired badminton player. He was drafted into the national team in 2004. His best achievement is reaching the semi-finals of the 2012 and 2013 China Open, where he was defeated by Chen Long on both occasions.

== Background ==
Chong was born on 26 May 1987 in Sungai Petani, Kedah. Chong started playing badminton at the age of nine, where he went to a private coaching centre. Chong was drafted into the national team through Badminton Association of Malaysia annual selections in 2004. On 29 March 2016, Chong announced his resignation from BAM effective 1 May 2016.

== Achievements ==
=== Asian Championships ===
Men's singles
Year	Venue	Opponent	Score	Result
2013	Taipei Arena; Taipei, Taiwan	(China) Chen Long	17–21, 15–21	Bronze

=== Southeast Asian Games ===
Men's singles
Year	Venue	Opponent	Score	Result
2015	Singapore Indoor Stadium, Singapore	(Malaysia) Mohamad Arif Abdul Latif	21–8, 21–9	Gold

=== BWF Grand Prix ===
The BWF Grand Prix had two levels, the Grand Prix and Grand Prix Gold. It was a series of badminton tournaments sanctioned by the Badminton World Federation (BWF) and played between 2007 and 2017.

Men's singles
Year	Tournament	Opponent	Score	Result
2009	Vietnam Open	(Vietnam) Nguyễn Tiến Minh	7–21, 21–19, 14–21	(silver) Runner-up
2016	Vietnam Open	(Hong Kong) Wong Wing Ki	12–21, 21–14, 13–21	(silver) Runner-up

BWF Grand Prix Gold tournament
BWF Grand Prix tournament

=== BWF International Challenge/Series ===
Men's singles
Year	Tournament	Opponent	Score	Result
2007	India International Challenge	(India) Chetan Anand	21–18, 20–22, 21–15	(gold) Winner
2008	Vietnam International	(Vietnam) Nguyễn Tiến Minh	17–21, 21–10, 24–26	(silver) Runner-up
2008	Malaysia International	(Malaysia) Kuan Beng Hong	7–21, 15–21	(silver) Runner-up
2009	Malaysia International	(Malaysia) Chan Kwong Beng	21–17, 21–14	(gold) Winner

BWF International Challenge tournament
BWF International Series tournament
