= 2021 BWF World Tour =

Tournament details
- Dates: 2 March – 5 December
- Edition: 4th

The 2021 BWF World Tour (officially known as 2021 HSBC BWF World Tour for sponsorship reasons) was the fourth season of the BWF World Tour of badminton, a circuit of 27 tournaments which led up to the World Tour Finals tournament. The 28 tournaments were divided into five levels: Level 1 is the said World Tour Finals, Level 2 called Super 1000 (four tournaments), Level 3 called Super 750 (five tournaments), Level 4 called Super 500 (seven tournaments) and Level 5 called Super 300 (11 tournaments). Each of these tournaments offered different ranking points and prize money. The highest points and prize pool were offered at the Super 1000 level (including the World Tour Finals).

One other category of tournament, the BWF Tour Super 100 (level 6), also offered BWF World Tour ranking points. Although this level was not part of the BWF World Tour, it was an important part of the pathway and entry point for players into the BWF World Tour tournaments. When the eight Level 6 grade tournaments of the BWF Tour Super 100 were included, the complete tour consists of 36 tournaments.

== Results ==
Below is the schedule released by the Badminton World Federation:

=== Key ===
World Tour Finals
Super 1000
Super 750
Super 500
Super 300
Super 100

=== Winners ===
Tour	Report	Men's singles	Women's singles	Men's doubles	Women's doubles	Mixed doubles
World Tour Finals
(Indonesia) BWF World Tour Finals	Report	(Denmark) Viktor Axelsen	(South Korea) An Se-young	(Japan) Takuro Hoki (Japan) Yugo Kobayashi	(South Korea) Kim So-yeong (South Korea) Kong Hee-yong	(Thailand) Dechapol Puavaranukroh (Thailand) Sapsiree Taerattanachai
Super 1000
All England Open	Report	(Malaysia) Lee Zii Jia	(Japan) Nozomi Okuhara	(Japan) Hiroyuki Endo (Japan) Yuta Watanabe	(Japan) Mayu Matsumoto (Japan) Wakana Nagahara	(Japan) Yuta Watanabe (Japan) Arisa Higashino
China Open	Report	Cancelled				
Denmark Open	Report	(Denmark) Viktor Axelsen	(Japan) Akane Yamaguchi	(Japan) Takuro Hoki (Japan) Yugo Kobayashi	(China) Huang Dongping (China) Zheng Yu	(Japan) Yuta Watanabe (Japan) Arisa Higashino
Indonesia Open	Report	(Denmark) Viktor Axelsen	(South Korea) An Se-young	(Indonesia) Marcus Fernaldi Gideon (Indonesia) Kevin Sanjaya Sukamuljo	(Japan) Nami Matsuyama (Japan) Chiharu Shida	(Thailand) Dechapol Puavaranukroh (Thailand) Sapsiree Taerattanachai
Super 750
Malaysia Open	Report	Cancelled				
Japan Open	Report	Cancelled				
(France) French Open	Report	(Japan) Kanta Tsuneyama	(Japan) Akane Yamaguchi	(South Korea) Ko Sung-hyun (South Korea) Shin Baek-cheol	(South Korea) Lee So-hee (South Korea) Shin Seung-chan	(Japan) Yuta Watanabe (Japan) Arisa Higashino
Fuzhou China Open	Report	Cancelled				
Indonesia Masters	Report	(Japan) Kento Momota	(South Korea) An Se-young	(Japan) Takuro Hoki (Japan) Yugo Kobayashi	(Japan) Nami Matsuyama (Japan) Chiharu Shida	(Thailand) Dechapol Puavaranukroh (Thailand) Sapsiree Taerattanachai
Super 500
Malaysia Masters	Report	Cancelled				
India Open	Report	Cancelled				
Singapore Open	Report	Cancelled				
Thailand Open	Report	Cancelled				
(South Korea) Korea Open	Report	Cancelled				
(Germany) Hylo Open	Report	(Singapore) Loh Kean Yew	(Thailand) Busanan Ongbamrungphan	(Indonesia) Marcus Fernaldi Gideon (Indonesia) Kevin Sanjaya Sukamuljo	(Japan) Chisato Hoshi (Japan) Aoi Matsuda	(Thailand) Dechapol Puavaranukroh (Thailand) Sapsiree Taerattanachai
Hong Kong Open	Report	Cancelled				
Super 300
Thailand Masters	Report	Cancelled				
(Switzerland) Swiss Open	Report	(Denmark) Viktor Axelsen	(Spain) Carolina Marín	(Denmark) Kim Astrup (Denmark) Anders Skaarup Rasmussen	(Malaysia) Pearly Tan (Malaysia) Thinaah Muralitharan	(France) Thom Gicquel (France) Delphine Delrue
(Germany) German Open	Report	Cancelled				
New Zealand Open	Report	Cancelled				
(Australia) Australian Open	Report	Cancelled				
Spain Masters	Report	(France) Toma Junior Popov	(Indonesia) Putri Kusuma Wardani	(Indonesia) Pramudya Kusumawardana (Indonesia) Yeremia Rambitan	(Indonesia) Yulfira Barkah (Indonesia) Febby Valencia Dwijayanti Gani	(Indonesia) Rinov Rivaldy (Indonesia) Pitha Haningtyas Mentari
(South Korea) Korea Masters	Report	Cancelled				
(United States) U.S. Open	Report	Cancelled				
(Chinese Taipei) Taipei Open	Report	Cancelled				
(India) Syed Modi International	Report	Cancelled				
Macau Open	Report	Cancelled				
Super 100
(France) Orléans Masters	Report	(France) Toma Junior Popov	(Thailand) Busanan Ongbamrungphan	(England) Ben Lane (England) Sean Vendy	(Thailand) Jongkolphan Kititharakul (Thailand) Rawinda Prajongjai	(Denmark) Mathias Christiansen (Denmark) Alexandra Bøje
Lingshui China Masters	Report	Cancelled				
Canada Open	Report	Cancelled				
(Russia) Russian Open	Report	Cancelled				
(Japan) Akita Masters	Report	Cancelled				
(India) Hyderabad Open	Report	Cancelled				
Vietnam Open	Report	Cancelled				
Indonesia Masters Super 100	Report	Cancelled				

== Finals ==
This is the complete schedule of events on the 2021 calendar, with the champions and runners-up documented.

=== January ===
Date	Tournament	Champions	Runners-up
12–17 January	Thailand Masters (Draw) (cancelled) (Note: Thailand Masters was cancelled because Thailand hosted the Asian leg of the 2020 season in the same month.): Host: Bangkok, Thailand; Venue: Indoor Stadium Huamark; Level: Super 300; Prize: $170,000; Format: 32MS/32WS/32MD/32WD/32XD		
12–17 January	Thailand Masters (Draw) (cancelled): Host: Bangkok, Thailand; Venue: Indoor Stadium Huamark; Level: Super 300; Prize: $170,000; Format: 32MS/32WS/32MD/32WD/32XD	Score:	
12–17 January	Thailand Masters (Draw) (cancelled): Host: Bangkok, Thailand; Venue: Indoor Stadium Huamark; Level: Super 300; Prize: $170,000; Format: 32MS/32WS/32MD/32WD/32XD	Score:	
12–17 January	Thailand Masters (Draw) (cancelled): Host: Bangkok, Thailand; Venue: Indoor Stadium Huamark; Level: Super 300; Prize: $170,000; Format: 32MS/32WS/32MD/32WD/32XD	Score:	
12–17 January	Thailand Masters (Draw) (cancelled): Host: Bangkok, Thailand; Venue: Indoor Stadium Huamark; Level: Super 300; Prize: $170,000; Format: 32MS/32WS/32MD/32WD/32XD	Score:	
12–17 January	Thailand Masters (Draw) (cancelled): Host: Bangkok, Thailand; Venue: Indoor Stadium Huamark; Level: Super 300; Prize: $170,000; Format: 32MS/32WS/32MD/32WD/32XD	Score:	

=== February ===
No World Tour tournaments were held in February.

=== March ===
Date	Tournament	Champions	Runners-up
2–7 March	(Switzerland) Swiss Open (Draw): Host: Basel, Switzerland; Venue: St. Jakobshalle; Level: Super 300; Prize: $140,000; Format: 32MS/32WS/32MD/32WD/32XD	(Denmark) Viktor Axelsen	(Thailand) Kunlavut Vitidsarn
2–7 March	(Switzerland) Swiss Open (Draw): Host: Basel, Switzerland; Venue: St. Jakobshalle; Level: Super 300; Prize: $140,000; Format: 32MS/32WS/32MD/32WD/32XD	Score: 21–16, 21–6	
2–7 March	(Switzerland) Swiss Open (Draw): Host: Basel, Switzerland; Venue: St. Jakobshalle; Level: Super 300; Prize: $140,000; Format: 32MS/32WS/32MD/32WD/32XD	(Spain) Carolina Marín	(India) P. V. Sindhu
2–7 March	(Switzerland) Swiss Open (Draw): Host: Basel, Switzerland; Venue: St. Jakobshalle; Level: Super 300; Prize: $140,000; Format: 32MS/32WS/32MD/32WD/32XD	Score: 21–12, 21–5	
2–7 March	(Switzerland) Swiss Open (Draw): Host: Basel, Switzerland; Venue: St. Jakobshalle; Level: Super 300; Prize: $140,000; Format: 32MS/32WS/32MD/32WD/32XD	(Denmark) Kim Astrup (Denmark) Anders Skaarup Rasmussen	(Germany) Mark Lamsfuß (Germany) Marvin Emil Seidel
2–7 March	(Switzerland) Swiss Open (Draw): Host: Basel, Switzerland; Venue: St. Jakobshalle; Level: Super 300; Prize: $140,000; Format: 32MS/32WS/32MD/32WD/32XD	Score: 21–16, 21–11	
2–7 March	(Switzerland) Swiss Open (Draw): Host: Basel, Switzerland; Venue: St. Jakobshalle; Level: Super 300; Prize: $140,000; Format: 32MS/32WS/32MD/32WD/32XD	(Malaysia) Pearly Tan (Malaysia) Thinaah Muralitharan	(Bulgaria) Gabriela Stoeva (Bulgaria) Stefani Stoeva
2–7 March	(Switzerland) Swiss Open (Draw): Host: Basel, Switzerland; Venue: St. Jakobshalle; Level: Super 300; Prize: $140,000; Format: 32MS/32WS/32MD/32WD/32XD	Score: 21–19, 21–12	
2–7 March	(Switzerland) Swiss Open (Draw): Host: Basel, Switzerland; Venue: St. Jakobshalle; Level: Super 300; Prize: $140,000; Format: 32MS/32WS/32MD/32WD/32XD	(France) Thom Gicquel (France) Delphine Delrue	(Denmark) Mathias Christiansen (Denmark) Alexandra Bøje
2–7 March	(Switzerland) Swiss Open (Draw): Host: Basel, Switzerland; Venue: St. Jakobshalle; Level: Super 300; Prize: $140,000; Format: 32MS/32WS/32MD/32WD/32XD	Score: 21–19, 21–19	
9–14 March	(Germany) German Open (Draw) (cancelled) (Note: This tournament, originally to be played on said dates, was later cancelled due to the COVID-19 pandemic in Germany.): Host: Mülheim, Germany; Venue: Innogy Sporthalle; Level: Super 300; Prize: $140,000; Format: 32MS/32WS/32MD/32WD/32XD		
9–14 March	(Germany) German Open (Draw) (cancelled): Host: Mülheim, Germany; Venue: Innogy Sporthalle; Level: Super 300; Prize: $140,000; Format: 32MS/32WS/32MD/32WD/32XD	Score:	
9–14 March	(Germany) German Open (Draw) (cancelled): Host: Mülheim, Germany; Venue: Innogy Sporthalle; Level: Super 300; Prize: $140,000; Format: 32MS/32WS/32MD/32WD/32XD	Score:	
9–14 March	(Germany) German Open (Draw) (cancelled): Host: Mülheim, Germany; Venue: Innogy Sporthalle; Level: Super 300; Prize: $140,000; Format: 32MS/32WS/32MD/32WD/32XD	Score:	
9–14 March	(Germany) German Open (Draw) (cancelled): Host: Mülheim, Germany; Venue: Innogy Sporthalle; Level: Super 300; Prize: $140,000; Format: 32MS/32WS/32MD/32WD/32XD	Score:	
9–14 March	(Germany) German Open (Draw) (cancelled): Host: Mülheim, Germany; Venue: Innogy Sporthalle; Level: Super 300; Prize: $140,000; Format: 32MS/32WS/32MD/32WD/32XD	Score:	
17–21 March	All England Open (Draw): Host: Birmingham, England; Venue: Utilita Arena Birmingham; Level: Super 1000; Prize: $850,000; Format: 32MS/32WS/32MD/32WD/32XD	(Malaysia) Lee Zii Jia	(Denmark) Viktor Axelsen
17–21 March	All England Open (Draw): Host: Birmingham, England; Venue: Utilita Arena Birmingham; Level: Super 1000; Prize: $850,000; Format: 32MS/32WS/32MD/32WD/32XD	Score: 30–29, 20–22, 21–9	
17–21 March	All England Open (Draw): Host: Birmingham, England; Venue: Utilita Arena Birmingham; Level: Super 1000; Prize: $850,000; Format: 32MS/32WS/32MD/32WD/32XD	(Japan) Nozomi Okuhara	(Thailand) Pornpawee Chochuwong
17–21 March	All England Open (Draw): Host: Birmingham, England; Venue: Utilita Arena Birmingham; Level: Super 1000; Prize: $850,000; Format: 32MS/32WS/32MD/32WD/32XD	Score: 21–12, 21–16	
17–21 March	All England Open (Draw): Host: Birmingham, England; Venue: Utilita Arena Birmingham; Level: Super 1000; Prize: $850,000; Format: 32MS/32WS/32MD/32WD/32XD	(Japan) Hiroyuki Endo (Japan) Yuta Watanabe	(Japan) Takeshi Kamura (Japan) Keigo Sonoda
17–21 March	All England Open (Draw): Host: Birmingham, England; Venue: Utilita Arena Birmingham; Level: Super 1000; Prize: $850,000; Format: 32MS/32WS/32MD/32WD/32XD	Score: 21–15, 17–21, 21–11	
17–21 March	All England Open (Draw): Host: Birmingham, England; Venue: Utilita Arena Birmingham; Level: Super 1000; Prize: $850,000; Format: 32MS/32WS/32MD/32WD/32XD	(Japan) Mayu Matsumoto (Japan) Wakana Nagahara	(Japan) Yuki Fukushima (Japan) Sayaka Hirota
17–21 March	All England Open (Draw): Host: Birmingham, England; Venue: Utilita Arena Birmingham; Level: Super 1000; Prize: $850,000; Format: 32MS/32WS/32MD/32WD/32XD	Score: 21–18, 21–16	
17–21 March	All England Open (Draw): Host: Birmingham, England; Venue: Utilita Arena Birmingham; Level: Super 1000; Prize: $850,000; Format: 32MS/32WS/32MD/32WD/32XD	(Japan) Yuta Watanabe (Japan) Arisa Higashino	(Japan) Yuki Kaneko (Japan) Misaki Matsutomo
17–21 March	All England Open (Draw): Host: Birmingham, England; Venue: Utilita Arena Birmingham; Level: Super 1000; Prize: $850,000; Format: 32MS/32WS/32MD/32WD/32XD	Score: 21–14, 21–13	
23–28 March	(France) Orléans Masters (Draw): Host: Orléans, France; Venue: Palais des Sports; Level: Super 100; Prize: $90,000; Format: 64MS/32WS/32MD/32WD/32XD	(France) Toma Junior Popov	(Denmark) Mads Christophersen
23–28 March	(France) Orléans Masters (Draw): Host: Orléans, France; Venue: Palais des Sports; Level: Super 100; Prize: $90,000; Format: 64MS/32WS/32MD/32WD/32XD	Score: 23–21, 21–13	
23–28 March	(France) Orléans Masters (Draw): Host: Orléans, France; Venue: Palais des Sports; Level: Super 100; Prize: $90,000; Format: 64MS/32WS/32MD/32WD/32XD	(Thailand) Busanan Ongbamrungphan	(Denmark) Line Christophersen
23–28 March	(France) Orléans Masters (Draw): Host: Orléans, France; Venue: Palais des Sports; Level: Super 100; Prize: $90,000; Format: 64MS/32WS/32MD/32WD/32XD	Score: 16–21, 21–15, 21–19	
23–28 March	(France) Orléans Masters (Draw): Host: Orléans, France; Venue: Palais des Sports; Level: Super 100; Prize: $90,000; Format: 64MS/32WS/32MD/32WD/32XD	(England) Ben Lane (England) Sean Vendy	(India) Krishna Prasad Garaga (India) Vishnu Vardhan Goud Panjala
23–28 March	(France) Orléans Masters (Draw): Host: Orléans, France; Venue: Palais des Sports; Level: Super 100; Prize: $90,000; Format: 64MS/32WS/32MD/32WD/32XD	Score: 19–21, 21–14, 21–19	
23–28 March	(France) Orléans Masters (Draw): Host: Orléans, France; Venue: Palais des Sports; Level: Super 100; Prize: $90,000; Format: 64MS/32WS/32MD/32WD/32XD	(Thailand) Jongkolphan Kititharakul (Thailand) Rawinda Prajongjai	(Bulgaria) Gabriela Stoeva (Bulgaria) Stefani Stoeva
23–28 March	(France) Orléans Masters (Draw): Host: Orléans, France; Venue: Palais des Sports; Level: Super 100; Prize: $90,000; Format: 64MS/32WS/32MD/32WD/32XD	Score: 21–16, 21–16	
23–28 March	(France) Orléans Masters (Draw): Host: Orléans, France; Venue: Palais des Sports; Level: Super 100; Prize: $90,000; Format: 64MS/32WS/32MD/32WD/32XD	(Denmark) Mathias Christiansen (Denmark) Alexandra Bøje	(Denmark) Niclas Nøhr (Denmark) Amalie Magelund
23–28 March	(France) Orléans Masters (Draw): Host: Orléans, France; Venue: Palais des Sports; Level: Super 100; Prize: $90,000; Format: 64MS/32WS/32MD/32WD/32XD	Score: 21–13, 21–17	
23–28 March	Lingshui China Masters (Draw) (cancelled) (Note: Tournament cancelled due to the COVID-19 pandemic in mainland China.): Host: Lingshui, China; Venue: Agile Stadium of Lingshui Culture and Sports Square; Level: Super 100; Prize: $90,000; Format: 48MS/32WS/32MD/32WD/32XD		
23–28 March	Lingshui China Masters (Draw) (cancelled): Host: Lingshui, China; Venue: Agile Stadium of Lingshui Culture and Sports Square; Level: Super 100; Prize: $90,000; Format: 48MS/32WS/32MD/32WD/32XD	Score:	
23–28 March	Lingshui China Masters (Draw) (cancelled): Host: Lingshui, China; Venue: Agile Stadium of Lingshui Culture and Sports Square; Level: Super 100; Prize: $90,000; Format: 48MS/32WS/32MD/32WD/32XD	Score:	
23–28 March	Lingshui China Masters (Draw) (cancelled): Host: Lingshui, China; Venue: Agile Stadium of Lingshui Culture and Sports Square; Level: Super 100; Prize: $90,000; Format: 48MS/32WS/32MD/32WD/32XD	Score:	
23–28 March	Lingshui China Masters (Draw) (cancelled): Host: Lingshui, China; Venue: Agile Stadium of Lingshui Culture and Sports Square; Level: Super 100; Prize: $90,000; Format: 48MS/32WS/32MD/32WD/32XD	Score:	
23–28 March	Lingshui China Masters (Draw) (cancelled): Host: Lingshui, China; Venue: Agile Stadium of Lingshui Culture and Sports Square; Level: Super 100; Prize: $90,000; Format: 48MS/32WS/32MD/32WD/32XD	Score:	

=== April ===
Date	Tournament	Champions	Runners-up
6–11 April	Malaysia Masters (Draw) (cancelled): Host: Kuala Lumpur, Malaysia; Venue: Axiata Arena; Level: Super 500; Prize: $400,000; Format: 32MS/32WS/32MD/32WD/32XD		
6–11 April	Malaysia Masters (Draw) (cancelled): Host: Kuala Lumpur, Malaysia; Venue: Axiata Arena; Level: Super 500; Prize: $400,000; Format: 32MS/32WS/32MD/32WD/32XD	Score:	
6–11 April	Malaysia Masters (Draw) (cancelled): Host: Kuala Lumpur, Malaysia; Venue: Axiata Arena; Level: Super 500; Prize: $400,000; Format: 32MS/32WS/32MD/32WD/32XD	Score:	
6–11 April	Malaysia Masters (Draw) (cancelled): Host: Kuala Lumpur, Malaysia; Venue: Axiata Arena; Level: Super 500; Prize: $400,000; Format: 32MS/32WS/32MD/32WD/32XD	Score:	
6–11 April	Malaysia Masters (Draw) (cancelled): Host: Kuala Lumpur, Malaysia; Venue: Axiata Arena; Level: Super 500; Prize: $400,000; Format: 32MS/32WS/32MD/32WD/32XD	Score:	
6–11 April	Malaysia Masters (Draw) (cancelled): Host: Kuala Lumpur, Malaysia; Venue: Axiata Arena; Level: Super 500; Prize: $400,000; Format: 32MS/32WS/32MD/32WD/32XD	Score:	

=== May ===
Date	Tournament	Champions	Runners-up
4–9 May	New Zealand Open (Draw) (cancelled) (Note: This tournament was cancelled due to the COVID-19 pandemic on 28 June 2021.): Host: Auckland, New Zealand; Venue: Eventfinda Stadium; Level: Super 300; Prize: $200,000; Format: 32MS/32WS/32MD/32WD/32XD		
4–9 May	New Zealand Open (Draw) (cancelled): Host: Auckland, New Zealand; Venue: Eventfinda Stadium; Level: Super 300; Prize: $200,000; Format: 32MS/32WS/32MD/32WD/32XD	Score:	
4–9 May	New Zealand Open (Draw) (cancelled): Host: Auckland, New Zealand; Venue: Eventfinda Stadium; Level: Super 300; Prize: $200,000; Format: 32MS/32WS/32MD/32WD/32XD	Score:	
4–9 May	New Zealand Open (Draw) (cancelled): Host: Auckland, New Zealand; Venue: Eventfinda Stadium; Level: Super 300; Prize: $200,000; Format: 32MS/32WS/32MD/32WD/32XD	Score:	
4–9 May	New Zealand Open (Draw) (cancelled): Host: Auckland, New Zealand; Venue: Eventfinda Stadium; Level: Super 300; Prize: $200,000; Format: 32MS/32WS/32MD/32WD/32XD	Score:	
4–9 May	New Zealand Open (Draw) (cancelled): Host: Auckland, New Zealand; Venue: Eventfinda Stadium; Level: Super 300; Prize: $200,000; Format: 32MS/32WS/32MD/32WD/32XD	Score:	
11–16 May	India Open (Draw) (cancelled): Host: New Delhi, India; Venue: K. D. Jadhav Indoor Stadium; Level: Super 500; Prize: $400,000; Format: 32MS/32WS/32MD/32WD/32XD		
11–16 May	India Open (Draw) (cancelled): Host: New Delhi, India; Venue: K. D. Jadhav Indoor Stadium; Level: Super 500; Prize: $400,000; Format: 32MS/32WS/32MD/32WD/32XD	Score:	
11–16 May	India Open (Draw) (cancelled): Host: New Delhi, India; Venue: K. D. Jadhav Indoor Stadium; Level: Super 500; Prize: $400,000; Format: 32MS/32WS/32MD/32WD/32XD	Score:	
11–16 May	India Open (Draw) (cancelled): Host: New Delhi, India; Venue: K. D. Jadhav Indoor Stadium; Level: Super 500; Prize: $400,000; Format: 32MS/32WS/32MD/32WD/32XD	Score:	
11–16 May	India Open (Draw) (cancelled): Host: New Delhi, India; Venue: K. D. Jadhav Indoor Stadium; Level: Super 500; Prize: $400,000; Format: 32MS/32WS/32MD/32WD/32XD	Score:	
11–16 May	India Open (Draw) (cancelled): Host: New Delhi, India; Venue: K. D. Jadhav Indoor Stadium; Level: Super 500; Prize: $400,000; Format: 32MS/32WS/32MD/32WD/32XD	Score:	
11–16 May	(Australia) Australian Open (Draw) (cancelled): Host: Sydney, Australia; Venue: Sydney Olympic Park; Level: Super 300; Prize: $170,000; Format: 32MS/32WS/32MD/32WD/32XD		
11–16 May	(Australia) Australian Open (Draw) (cancelled): Host: Sydney, Australia; Venue: Sydney Olympic Park; Level: Super 300; Prize: $170,000; Format: 32MS/32WS/32MD/32WD/32XD	Score:	
11–16 May	(Australia) Australian Open (Draw) (cancelled): Host: Sydney, Australia; Venue: Sydney Olympic Park; Level: Super 300; Prize: $170,000; Format: 32MS/32WS/32MD/32WD/32XD	Score:	
11–16 May	(Australia) Australian Open (Draw) (cancelled): Host: Sydney, Australia; Venue: Sydney Olympic Park; Level: Super 300; Prize: $170,000; Format: 32MS/32WS/32MD/32WD/32XD	Score:	
11–16 May	(Australia) Australian Open (Draw) (cancelled): Host: Sydney, Australia; Venue: Sydney Olympic Park; Level: Super 300; Prize: $170,000; Format: 32MS/32WS/32MD/32WD/32XD	Score:	
11–16 May	(Australia) Australian Open (Draw) (cancelled): Host: Sydney, Australia; Venue: Sydney Olympic Park; Level: Super 300; Prize: $170,000; Format: 32MS/32WS/32MD/32WD/32XD	Score:	
18–23 May	Spain Masters (Draw): Host: Huelva, Spain; Venue: Palacio de Deportes Carolina Marín; Level: Super 300; Prize: $140,000; Format: 32MS/32WS/32MD/32WD/32XD	(France) Toma Junior Popov	(Indonesia) Chico Aura Dwi Wardoyo
18–23 May	Spain Masters (Draw): Host: Huelva, Spain; Venue: Palacio de Deportes Carolina Marín; Level: Super 300; Prize: $140,000; Format: 32MS/32WS/32MD/32WD/32XD	Score: 21–15, 21–17	
18–23 May	Spain Masters (Draw): Host: Huelva, Spain; Venue: Palacio de Deportes Carolina Marín; Level: Super 300; Prize: $140,000; Format: 32MS/32WS/32MD/32WD/32XD	(Indonesia) Putri Kusuma Wardani	(Denmark) Line Christophersen
18–23 May	Spain Masters (Draw): Host: Huelva, Spain; Venue: Palacio de Deportes Carolina Marín; Level: Super 300; Prize: $140,000; Format: 32MS/32WS/32MD/32WD/32XD	Score: 21–15, 21–10	
18–23 May	Spain Masters (Draw): Host: Huelva, Spain; Venue: Palacio de Deportes Carolina Marín; Level: Super 300; Prize: $140,000; Format: 32MS/32WS/32MD/32WD/32XD	(Indonesia) Pramudya Kusumawardana (Indonesia) Yeremia Rambitan	(Indonesia) Sabar Karyaman Gutama (Indonesia) Muhammad Reza Pahlevi Isfahani
18–23 May	Spain Masters (Draw): Host: Huelva, Spain; Venue: Palacio de Deportes Carolina Marín; Level: Super 300; Prize: $140,000; Format: 32MS/32WS/32MD/32WD/32XD	Score: 21–15, 18–21, 21–14	
18–23 May	Spain Masters (Draw): Host: Huelva, Spain; Venue: Palacio de Deportes Carolina Marín; Level: Super 300; Prize: $140,000; Format: 32MS/32WS/32MD/32WD/32XD	(Indonesia) Yulfira Barkah (Indonesia) Febby Valencia Dwijayanti Gani	(Denmark) Amalie Magelund (Denmark) Freja Ravn
18–23 May	Spain Masters (Draw): Host: Huelva, Spain; Venue: Palacio de Deportes Carolina Marín; Level: Super 300; Prize: $140,000; Format: 32MS/32WS/32MD/32WD/32XD	Score: 21–16, 21–14	
18–23 May	Spain Masters (Draw): Host: Huelva, Spain; Venue: Palacio de Deportes Carolina Marín; Level: Super 300; Prize: $140,000; Format: 32MS/32WS/32MD/32WD/32XD	(Indonesia) Rinov Rivaldy (Indonesia) Pitha Haningtyas Mentari	(Denmark) Niclas Nøhr (Denmark) Amalie Magelund
18–23 May	Spain Masters (Draw): Host: Huelva, Spain; Venue: Palacio de Deportes Carolina Marín; Level: Super 300; Prize: $140,000; Format: 32MS/32WS/32MD/32WD/32XD	Score: 21–18, 21–15	
25–30 May	Malaysia Open (Draw) (cancelled) (Note: This tournament was cancelled due to the COVID-19 pandemic on 28 October 2021.): Host: Kuala Lumpur, Malaysia; Venue: Axiata Arena; Level: Super 750; Prize: $750,000; Format: 32MS/32WS/32MD/32WD/32XD		
25–30 May	Malaysia Open (Draw) (cancelled): Host: Kuala Lumpur, Malaysia; Venue: Axiata Arena; Level: Super 750; Prize: $750,000; Format: 32MS/32WS/32MD/32WD/32XD	Score:	
25–30 May	Malaysia Open (Draw) (cancelled): Host: Kuala Lumpur, Malaysia; Venue: Axiata Arena; Level: Super 750; Prize: $750,000; Format: 32MS/32WS/32MD/32WD/32XD	Score:	
25–30 May	Malaysia Open (Draw) (cancelled): Host: Kuala Lumpur, Malaysia; Venue: Axiata Arena; Level: Super 750; Prize: $750,000; Format: 32MS/32WS/32MD/32WD/32XD	Score:	
25–30 May	Malaysia Open (Draw) (cancelled): Host: Kuala Lumpur, Malaysia; Venue: Axiata Arena; Level: Super 750; Prize: $750,000; Format: 32MS/32WS/32MD/32WD/32XD	Score:	
25–30 May	Malaysia Open (Draw) (cancelled): Host: Kuala Lumpur, Malaysia; Venue: Axiata Arena; Level: Super 750; Prize: $750,000; Format: 32MS/32WS/32MD/32WD/32XD	Score:	

=== June ===
Date	Tournament	Champions	Runners-up
1–6 June	Singapore Open (Draw) (cancelled) (Note: This tournament was cancelled due to the COVID-19 pandemic in Singapore on 12 May 2021.): Host: Singapore; Venue: Singapore Indoor Stadium; Level: Super 500; Prize: $320,000; Format: 32MS/32WS/32MD/32WD/32XD		
1–6 June	Singapore Open (Draw) (cancelled): Host: Singapore; Venue: Singapore Indoor Stadium; Level: Super 500; Prize: $320,000; Format: 32MS/32WS/32MD/32WD/32XD	Score:	
1–6 June	Singapore Open (Draw) (cancelled): Host: Singapore; Venue: Singapore Indoor Stadium; Level: Super 500; Prize: $320,000; Format: 32MS/32WS/32MD/32WD/32XD	Score:	
1–6 June	Singapore Open (Draw) (cancelled): Host: Singapore; Venue: Singapore Indoor Stadium; Level: Super 500; Prize: $320,000; Format: 32MS/32WS/32MD/32WD/32XD	Score:	
1–6 June	Singapore Open (Draw) (cancelled): Host: Singapore; Venue: Singapore Indoor Stadium; Level: Super 500; Prize: $320,000; Format: 32MS/32WS/32MD/32WD/32XD	Score:	
1–6 June	Singapore Open (Draw) (cancelled): Host: Singapore; Venue: Singapore Indoor Stadium; Level: Super 500; Prize: $320,000; Format: 32MS/32WS/32MD/32WD/32XD	Score:	
1–6 June	(South Korea) Korea Masters (Draw) (cancelled) (Note: Tournament cancelled due to the COVID-19 pandemic on 11 August 2021.): Host: TBD, South Korea; Venue: TBD; Level: Super 300; Prize: $200,000; Format: 32MS/32WS/32MD/32WD/32XD		
1–6 June	(South Korea) Korea Masters (Draw) (cancelled): Host: TBD, South Korea; Venue: TBD; Level: Super 300; Prize: $200,000; Format: 32MS/32WS/32MD/32WD/32XD	Score:	
1–6 June	(South Korea) Korea Masters (Draw) (cancelled): Host: TBD, South Korea; Venue: TBD; Level: Super 300; Prize: $200,000; Format: 32MS/32WS/32MD/32WD/32XD	Score:	
1–6 June	(South Korea) Korea Masters (Draw) (cancelled): Host: TBD, South Korea; Venue: TBD; Level: Super 300; Prize: $200,000; Format: 32MS/32WS/32MD/32WD/32XD	Score:	
1–6 June	(South Korea) Korea Masters (Draw) (cancelled): Host: TBD, South Korea; Venue: TBD; Level: Super 300; Prize: $200,000; Format: 32MS/32WS/32MD/32WD/32XD	Score:	
1–6 June	(South Korea) Korea Masters (Draw) (cancelled): Host: TBD, South Korea; Venue: TBD; Level: Super 300; Prize: $200,000; Format: 32MS/32WS/32MD/32WD/32XD	Score:	
15–20 June	Thailand Open (Draw) (cancelled) (Note: Tournament cancelled due to the COVID-19 pandemic.): Host: Bangkok, Thailand; Venue: Indoor Stadium Huamark; Level: Super 500; Prize: $400,000; Format: 32MS/32WS/32MD/32WD/32XD		
15–20 June	Thailand Open (Draw) (cancelled): Host: Bangkok, Thailand; Venue: Indoor Stadium Huamark; Level: Super 500; Prize: $400,000; Format: 32MS/32WS/32MD/32WD/32XD	Score:	
15–20 June	Thailand Open (Draw) (cancelled): Host: Bangkok, Thailand; Venue: Indoor Stadium Huamark; Level: Super 500; Prize: $400,000; Format: 32MS/32WS/32MD/32WD/32XD	Score:	
15–20 June	Thailand Open (Draw) (cancelled): Host: Bangkok, Thailand; Venue: Indoor Stadium Huamark; Level: Super 500; Prize: $400,000; Format: 32MS/32WS/32MD/32WD/32XD	Score:	
15–20 June	Thailand Open (Draw) (cancelled): Host: Bangkok, Thailand; Venue: Indoor Stadium Huamark; Level: Super 500; Prize: $400,000; Format: 32MS/32WS/32MD/32WD/32XD	Score:	
15–20 June	Thailand Open (Draw) (cancelled): Host: Bangkok, Thailand; Venue: Indoor Stadium Huamark; Level: Super 500; Prize: $400,000; Format: 32MS/32WS/32MD/32WD/32XD	Score:	
29 June – 4 July	Canada Open (Draw) (cancelled) (Note: Tournament cancelled due to the COVID-19 pandemic on 12 March 2021.): Host: Calgary, Canada; Venue: WinSport; Level: Super 100; Prize: $90,000; Format: 48MS/32WS/32MD/32WD/32XD		
29 June – 4 July	Canada Open (Draw) (cancelled): Host: Calgary, Canada; Venue: WinSport; Level: Super 100; Prize: $90,000; Format: 48MS/32WS/32MD/32WD/32XD	Score:	
29 June – 4 July	Canada Open (Draw) (cancelled): Host: Calgary, Canada; Venue: WinSport; Level: Super 100; Prize: $90,000; Format: 48MS/32WS/32MD/32WD/32XD	Score:	
29 June – 4 July	Canada Open (Draw) (cancelled): Host: Calgary, Canada; Venue: WinSport; Level: Super 100; Prize: $90,000; Format: 48MS/32WS/32MD/32WD/32XD	Score:	
29 June – 4 July	Canada Open (Draw) (cancelled): Host: Calgary, Canada; Venue: WinSport; Level: Super 100; Prize: $90,000; Format: 48MS/32WS/32MD/32WD/32XD	Score:	
29 June – 4 July	Canada Open (Draw) (cancelled): Host: Calgary, Canada; Venue: WinSport; Level: Super 100; Prize: $90,000; Format: 48MS/32WS/32MD/32WD/32XD	Score:	

=== July ===
Date	Tournament	Champions	Runners-up
6–11 July	(United States) U.S. Open (Draw) (cancelled): Host: Fullerton, California, United States; Venue: TBD; Level: Super 300; Prize: $170,000; Format: 32MS/32WS/32MD/32WD/32XD		
6–11 July	(United States) U.S. Open (Draw) (cancelled): Host: Fullerton, California, United States; Venue: TBD; Level: Super 300; Prize: $170,000; Format: 32MS/32WS/32MD/32WD/32XD	Score:	
6–11 July	(United States) U.S. Open (Draw) (cancelled): Host: Fullerton, California, United States; Venue: TBD; Level: Super 300; Prize: $170,000; Format: 32MS/32WS/32MD/32WD/32XD	Score:	
6–11 July	(United States) U.S. Open (Draw) (cancelled): Host: Fullerton, California, United States; Venue: TBD; Level: Super 300; Prize: $170,000; Format: 32MS/32WS/32MD/32WD/32XD	Score:	
6–11 July	(United States) U.S. Open (Draw) (cancelled): Host: Fullerton, California, United States; Venue: TBD; Level: Super 300; Prize: $170,000; Format: 32MS/32WS/32MD/32WD/32XD	Score:	
6–11 July	(United States) U.S. Open (Draw) (cancelled): Host: Fullerton, California, United States; Venue: TBD; Level: Super 300; Prize: $170,000; Format: 32MS/32WS/32MD/32WD/32XD	Score:	
20–25 July	(Russia) Russian Open (Draw) (cancelled) (Note: This tournament, originally to be played on said dates, was later cancelled due to the COVID-19 pandemic in Russia.): Host: Vladivostok, Russia; Venue: TBD; Level: Super 100; Prize: $90,000; Format: 48MS/32WS/32MD/32WD/32XD		
20–25 July	(Russia) Russian Open (Draw) (cancelled): Host: Vladivostok, Russia; Venue: TBD; Level: Super 100; Prize: $90,000; Format: 48MS/32WS/32MD/32WD/32XD	Score:	
20–25 July	(Russia) Russian Open (Draw) (cancelled): Host: Vladivostok, Russia; Venue: TBD; Level: Super 100; Prize: $90,000; Format: 48MS/32WS/32MD/32WD/32XD	Score:	
20–25 July	(Russia) Russian Open (Draw) (cancelled): Host: Vladivostok, Russia; Venue: TBD; Level: Super 100; Prize: $90,000; Format: 48MS/32WS/32MD/32WD/32XD	Score:	
20–25 July	(Russia) Russian Open (Draw) (cancelled): Host: Vladivostok, Russia; Venue: TBD; Level: Super 100; Prize: $90,000; Format: 48MS/32WS/32MD/32WD/32XD	Score:	
20–25 July	(Russia) Russian Open (Draw) (cancelled): Host: Vladivostok, Russia; Venue: TBD; Level: Super 100; Prize: $90,000; Format: 48MS/32WS/32MD/32WD/32XD	Score:	

=== August ===
Date	Tournament	Champions	Runners-up
17–22 August	(Japan) Akita Masters (Draw) (cancelled) (Note: Tournament cancelled due to the COVID-19 pandemic in Japan on 12 July 2021.): Host: Akita, Akita Prefecture, Japan; Venue: CNA Arena Akita; Level: Super 100; Prize: $90,000; Format: 48MS/32WS/32MD/32WD/32XD		
17–22 August	(Japan) Akita Masters (Draw) (cancelled): Host: Akita, Akita Prefecture, Japan; Venue: CNA Arena Akita; Level: Super 100; Prize: $90,000; Format: 48MS/32WS/32MD/32WD/32XD	Score:	
17–22 August	(Japan) Akita Masters (Draw) (cancelled): Host: Akita, Akita Prefecture, Japan; Venue: CNA Arena Akita; Level: Super 100; Prize: $90,000; Format: 48MS/32WS/32MD/32WD/32XD	Score:	
17–22 August	(Japan) Akita Masters (Draw) (cancelled): Host: Akita, Akita Prefecture, Japan; Venue: CNA Arena Akita; Level: Super 100; Prize: $90,000; Format: 48MS/32WS/32MD/32WD/32XD	Score:	
17–22 August	(Japan) Akita Masters (Draw) (cancelled): Host: Akita, Akita Prefecture, Japan; Venue: CNA Arena Akita; Level: Super 100; Prize: $90,000; Format: 48MS/32WS/32MD/32WD/32XD	Score:	
17–22 August	(Japan) Akita Masters (Draw) (cancelled): Host: Akita, Akita Prefecture, Japan; Venue: CNA Arena Akita; Level: Super 100; Prize: $90,000; Format: 48MS/32WS/32MD/32WD/32XD	Score:	
24–29 August	(India) Hyderabad Open (Draw) (cancelled) (Note: This tournament cancelled due to the COVID-19 pandemic in India on 28 June 2021.): Host: Hyderabad, India; Venue: TBD; Level: Super 100; Prize: $90,000; Format: 48MS/32WS/32MD/32WD/32XD		
24–29 August	(India) Hyderabad Open (Draw) (cancelled): Host: Hyderabad, India; Venue: TBD; Level: Super 100; Prize: $90,000; Format: 48MS/32WS/32MD/32WD/32XD	Score:	
24–29 August	(India) Hyderabad Open (Draw) (cancelled): Host: Hyderabad, India; Venue: TBD; Level: Super 100; Prize: $90,000; Format: 48MS/32WS/32MD/32WD/32XD	Score:	
24–29 August	(India) Hyderabad Open (Draw) (cancelled): Host: Hyderabad, India; Venue: TBD; Level: Super 100; Prize: $90,000; Format: 48MS/32WS/32MD/32WD/32XD	Score:	
24–29 August	(India) Hyderabad Open (Draw) (cancelled): Host: Hyderabad, India; Venue: TBD; Level: Super 100; Prize: $90,000; Format: 48MS/32WS/32MD/32WD/32XD	Score:	
24–29 August	(India) Hyderabad Open (Draw) (cancelled): Host: Hyderabad, India; Venue: TBD; Level: Super 100; Prize: $90,000; Format: 48MS/32WS/32MD/32WD/32XD	Score:	
31 August – 5 September	(South Korea) Korea Open (Draw) (cancelled): Host: Yeosu, South Korea; Venue: Jinnam Indoor Stadium; Level: Super 500; Prize: $320,000; Format: 32MS/32WS/32MD/32WD/32XD		
31 August – 5 September	(South Korea) Korea Open (Draw) (cancelled): Host: Yeosu, South Korea; Venue: Jinnam Indoor Stadium; Level: Super 500; Prize: $320,000; Format: 32MS/32WS/32MD/32WD/32XD	Score:	
31 August – 5 September	(South Korea) Korea Open (Draw) (cancelled): Host: Yeosu, South Korea; Venue: Jinnam Indoor Stadium; Level: Super 500; Prize: $320,000; Format: 32MS/32WS/32MD/32WD/32XD	Score:	
31 August – 5 September	(South Korea) Korea Open (Draw) (cancelled): Host: Yeosu, South Korea; Venue: Jinnam Indoor Stadium; Level: Super 500; Prize: $320,000; Format: 32MS/32WS/32MD/32WD/32XD	Score:	
31 August – 5 September	(South Korea) Korea Open (Draw) (cancelled): Host: Yeosu, South Korea; Venue: Jinnam Indoor Stadium; Level: Super 500; Prize: $320,000; Format: 32MS/32WS/32MD/32WD/32XD	Score:	
31 August – 5 September	(South Korea) Korea Open (Draw) (cancelled): Host: Yeosu, South Korea; Venue: Jinnam Indoor Stadium; Level: Super 500; Prize: $320,000; Format: 32MS/32WS/32MD/32WD/32XD	Score:	

=== September ===
Date	Tournament	Champions	Runners-up
7–12 September	(Chinese Taipei) Taipei Open (Draw) (cancelled) (Note: Tournament cancelled due to the COVID-19 pandemic in Taiwan on 15 August 2021.): Host: Taipei, Taiwan; Venue: Taipei Arena; Level: Super 300; Prize: $500,000; Format: 32MS/32WS/32MD/32WD/32XD		
7–12 September	(Chinese Taipei) Taipei Open (Draw) (cancelled): Host: Taipei, Taiwan; Venue: Taipei Arena; Level: Super 300; Prize: $500,000; Format: 32MS/32WS/32MD/32WD/32XD	Score:	
7–12 September	(Chinese Taipei) Taipei Open (Draw) (cancelled): Host: Taipei, Taiwan; Venue: Taipei Arena; Level: Super 300; Prize: $500,000; Format: 32MS/32WS/32MD/32WD/32XD	Score:	
7–12 September	(Chinese Taipei) Taipei Open (Draw) (cancelled): Host: Taipei, Taiwan; Venue: Taipei Arena; Level: Super 300; Prize: $500,000; Format: 32MS/32WS/32MD/32WD/32XD	Score:	
7–12 September	(Chinese Taipei) Taipei Open (Draw) (cancelled): Host: Taipei, Taiwan; Venue: Taipei Arena; Level: Super 300; Prize: $500,000; Format: 32MS/32WS/32MD/32WD/32XD	Score:	
7–12 September	(Chinese Taipei) Taipei Open (Draw) (cancelled): Host: Taipei, Taiwan; Venue: Taipei Arena; Level: Super 300; Prize: $500,000; Format: 32MS/32WS/32MD/32WD/32XD	Score:	
14–19 September	Vietnam Open (Draw) (cancelled): Host: Ho Chi Minh City, Vietnam; Venue: TBD; Level: Super 100; Prize: $90,000; Format: 48MS/32WS/32MD/32WD/32XD		
14–19 September	Vietnam Open (Draw) (cancelled): Host: Ho Chi Minh City, Vietnam; Venue: TBD; Level: Super 100; Prize: $90,000; Format: 48MS/32WS/32MD/32WD/32XD	Score:	
14–19 September	Vietnam Open (Draw) (cancelled): Host: Ho Chi Minh City, Vietnam; Venue: TBD; Level: Super 100; Prize: $90,000; Format: 48MS/32WS/32MD/32WD/32XD	Score:	
14–19 September	Vietnam Open (Draw) (cancelled): Host: Ho Chi Minh City, Vietnam; Venue: TBD; Level: Super 100; Prize: $90,000; Format: 48MS/32WS/32MD/32WD/32XD	Score:	
14–19 September	Vietnam Open (Draw) (cancelled): Host: Ho Chi Minh City, Vietnam; Venue: TBD; Level: Super 100; Prize: $90,000; Format: 48MS/32WS/32MD/32WD/32XD	Score:	
14–19 September	Vietnam Open (Draw) (cancelled): Host: Ho Chi Minh City, Vietnam; Venue: TBD; Level: Super 100; Prize: $90,000; Format: 48MS/32WS/32MD/32WD/32XD	Score:	
21–26 September	China Open (Draw) (cancelled): Host: Changzhou, China; Venue: Olympic Sports Center Xincheng Gymnasium; Level: Super 1000; Prize: $1,100,000; Format: 32MS/32WS/32MD/32WD/32XD		
21–26 September	China Open (Draw) (cancelled): Host: Changzhou, China; Venue: Olympic Sports Center Xincheng Gymnasium; Level: Super 1000; Prize: $1,100,000; Format: 32MS/32WS/32MD/32WD/32XD	Score:	
21–26 September	China Open (Draw) (cancelled): Host: Changzhou, China; Venue: Olympic Sports Center Xincheng Gymnasium; Level: Super 1000; Prize: $1,100,000; Format: 32MS/32WS/32MD/32WD/32XD	Score:	
21–26 September	China Open (Draw) (cancelled): Host: Changzhou, China; Venue: Olympic Sports Center Xincheng Gymnasium; Level: Super 1000; Prize: $1,100,000; Format: 32MS/32WS/32MD/32WD/32XD	Score:	
21–26 September	China Open (Draw) (cancelled): Host: Changzhou, China; Venue: Olympic Sports Center Xincheng Gymnasium; Level: Super 1000; Prize: $1,100,000; Format: 32MS/32WS/32MD/32WD/32XD	Score:	
21–26 September	China Open (Draw) (cancelled): Host: Changzhou, China; Venue: Olympic Sports Center Xincheng Gymnasium; Level: Super 1000; Prize: $1,100,000; Format: 32MS/32WS/32MD/32WD/32XD	Score:	
28 September – 3 October	Japan Open (Draw) (cancelled): Host: Tokyo, Japan; Venue: Tokyo Metropolitan Gymnasium; Level: Super 750; Prize: $750,000; Format: 32MS/32WS/32MD/32WD/32XD		
28 September – 3 October	Japan Open (Draw) (cancelled): Host: Tokyo, Japan; Venue: Tokyo Metropolitan Gymnasium; Level: Super 750; Prize: $750,000; Format: 32MS/32WS/32MD/32WD/32XD	Score:	
28 September – 3 October	Japan Open (Draw) (cancelled): Host: Tokyo, Japan; Venue: Tokyo Metropolitan Gymnasium; Level: Super 750; Prize: $750,000; Format: 32MS/32WS/32MD/32WD/32XD	Score:	
28 September – 3 October	Japan Open (Draw) (cancelled): Host: Tokyo, Japan; Venue: Tokyo Metropolitan Gymnasium; Level: Super 750; Prize: $750,000; Format: 32MS/32WS/32MD/32WD/32XD	Score:	
28 September – 3 October	Japan Open (Draw) (cancelled): Host: Tokyo, Japan; Venue: Tokyo Metropolitan Gymnasium; Level: Super 750; Prize: $750,000; Format: 32MS/32WS/32MD/32WD/32XD	Score:	
28 September – 3 October	Japan Open (Draw) (cancelled): Host: Tokyo, Japan; Venue: Tokyo Metropolitan Gymnasium; Level: Super 750; Prize: $750,000; Format: 32MS/32WS/32MD/32WD/32XD	Score:	

=== October ===
Date	Tournament	Champions	Runners-up
5–10 October	Indonesia Masters Super 100 (Draw) (cancelled) (Note: This tournament, originally to be played on said dates, was later cancelled due to the COVID-19 pandemic in Indonesia.): Host: TBD, Indonesia; Venue: TBD; Level: Super 100; Prize: $90,000; Format: 48MS/32WS/32MD/32WD/32XD		
5–10 October	Indonesia Masters Super 100 (Draw) (cancelled): Host: TBD, Indonesia; Venue: TBD; Level: Super 100; Prize: $90,000; Format: 48MS/32WS/32MD/32WD/32XD	Score:	
5–10 October	Indonesia Masters Super 100 (Draw) (cancelled): Host: TBD, Indonesia; Venue: TBD; Level: Super 100; Prize: $90,000; Format: 48MS/32WS/32MD/32WD/32XD	Score:	
5–10 October	Indonesia Masters Super 100 (Draw) (cancelled): Host: TBD, Indonesia; Venue: TBD; Level: Super 100; Prize: $90,000; Format: 48MS/32WS/32MD/32WD/32XD	Score:	
5–10 October	Indonesia Masters Super 100 (Draw) (cancelled): Host: TBD, Indonesia; Venue: TBD; Level: Super 100; Prize: $90,000; Format: 48MS/32WS/32MD/32WD/32XD	Score:	
5–10 October	Indonesia Masters Super 100 (Draw) (cancelled): Host: TBD, Indonesia; Venue: TBD; Level: Super 100; Prize: $90,000; Format: 48MS/32WS/32MD/32WD/32XD	Score:	
12–17 October	(India) Syed Modi International (Draw) (cancelled) (Note: Syed Modi India International 2021 Cancelled.): Host: Lucknow, India; Venue: TBD; Level: Super 300; Prize: $170,000; Format: 32MS/32WS/32MD/32WD/32XD		
12–17 October	(India) Syed Modi International (Draw) (cancelled): Host: Lucknow, India; Venue: TBD; Level: Super 300; Prize: $170,000; Format: 32MS/32WS/32MD/32WD/32XD	Score:	
12–17 October	(India) Syed Modi International (Draw) (cancelled): Host: Lucknow, India; Venue: TBD; Level: Super 300; Prize: $170,000; Format: 32MS/32WS/32MD/32WD/32XD	Score:	
12–17 October	(India) Syed Modi International (Draw) (cancelled): Host: Lucknow, India; Venue: TBD; Level: Super 300; Prize: $170,000; Format: 32MS/32WS/32MD/32WD/32XD	Score:	
12–17 October	(India) Syed Modi International (Draw) (cancelled): Host: Lucknow, India; Venue: TBD; Level: Super 300; Prize: $170,000; Format: 32MS/32WS/32MD/32WD/32XD	Score:	
12–17 October	(India) Syed Modi International (Draw) (cancelled): Host: Lucknow, India; Venue: TBD; Level: Super 300; Prize: $170,000; Format: 32MS/32WS/32MD/32WD/32XD	Score:	
19–24 October	Denmark Open (Draw): Host: Odense, Denmark; Venue: Odense Sports Park; Level: Super 1000; Prize: $850,000; Format: 32MS/32WS/32MD/32WD/32XD	(Denmark) Viktor Axelsen	(Japan) Kento Momota
19–24 October	Denmark Open (Draw): Host: Odense, Denmark; Venue: Odense Sports Park; Level: Super 1000; Prize: $850,000; Format: 32MS/32WS/32MD/32WD/32XD	Score: 20–22, 21–18, 21–12	
19–24 October	Denmark Open (Draw): Host: Odense, Denmark; Venue: Odense Sports Park; Level: Super 1000; Prize: $850,000; Format: 32MS/32WS/32MD/32WD/32XD	(Japan) Akane Yamaguchi	(South Korea) An Se-young
19–24 October	Denmark Open (Draw): Host: Odense, Denmark; Venue: Odense Sports Park; Level: Super 1000; Prize: $850,000; Format: 32MS/32WS/32MD/32WD/32XD	Score: 18–21, 25–23, 16–5 retired	
19–24 October	Denmark Open (Draw): Host: Odense, Denmark; Venue: Odense Sports Park; Level: Super 1000; Prize: $850,000; Format: 32MS/32WS/32MD/32WD/32XD	(Japan) Takuro Hoki (Japan) Yugo Kobayashi	(Denmark) Kim Astrup (Denmark) Anders Skaarup Rasmussen
19–24 October	Denmark Open (Draw): Host: Odense, Denmark; Venue: Odense Sports Park; Level: Super 1000; Prize: $850,000; Format: 32MS/32WS/32MD/32WD/32XD	Score: 21–18, 21–12	
19–24 October	Denmark Open (Draw): Host: Odense, Denmark; Venue: Odense Sports Park; Level: Super 1000; Prize: $850,000; Format: 32MS/32WS/32MD/32WD/32XD	(China) Huang Dongping (China) Zheng Yu	(South Korea) Lee So-hee (South Korea) Shin Seung-chan
19–24 October	Denmark Open (Draw): Host: Odense, Denmark; Venue: Odense Sports Park; Level: Super 1000; Prize: $850,000; Format: 32MS/32WS/32MD/32WD/32XD	Score: 21–15, 21–17	
19–24 October	Denmark Open (Draw): Host: Odense, Denmark; Venue: Odense Sports Park; Level: Super 1000; Prize: $850,000; Format: 32MS/32WS/32MD/32WD/32XD	(Japan) Yuta Watanabe (Japan) Arisa Higashino	(Thailand) Dechapol Puavaranukroh (Thailand) Sapsiree Taerattanachai
19–24 October	Denmark Open (Draw): Host: Odense, Denmark; Venue: Odense Sports Park; Level: Super 1000; Prize: $850,000; Format: 32MS/32WS/32MD/32WD/32XD	Score: 21–18, 21–9	
26–31 October	(France) French Open (Draw): Host: Paris, France; Venue: Stade Pierre de Coubertin; Level: Super 750; Prize: $600,000; Format: 32MS/32WS/32MD/32WD/32XD	(Japan) Kanta Tsuneyama	(Chinese Taipei) Chou Tien-chen
26–31 October	(France) French Open (Draw): Host: Paris, France; Venue: Stade Pierre de Coubertin; Level: Super 750; Prize: $600,000; Format: 32MS/32WS/32MD/32WD/32XD	Score: 15–21, 21–8, 21–17	
26–31 October	(France) French Open (Draw): Host: Paris, France; Venue: Stade Pierre de Coubertin; Level: Super 750; Prize: $600,000; Format: 32MS/32WS/32MD/32WD/32XD	(Japan) Akane Yamaguchi	(Japan) Sayaka Takahashi
26–31 October	(France) French Open (Draw): Host: Paris, France; Venue: Stade Pierre de Coubertin; Level: Super 750; Prize: $600,000; Format: 32MS/32WS/32MD/32WD/32XD	Score: 21–18, 21–12	
26–31 October	(France) French Open (Draw): Host: Paris, France; Venue: Stade Pierre de Coubertin; Level: Super 750; Prize: $600,000; Format: 32MS/32WS/32MD/32WD/32XD	(South Korea) Ko Sung-hyun (South Korea) Shin Baek-cheol	(Indonesia) Marcus Fernaldi Gideon (Indonesia) Kevin Sanjaya Sukamuljo
26–31 October	(France) French Open (Draw): Host: Paris, France; Venue: Stade Pierre de Coubertin; Level: Super 750; Prize: $600,000; Format: 32MS/32WS/32MD/32WD/32XD	Score: 21–17, 22–20	
26–31 October	(France) French Open (Draw): Host: Paris, France; Venue: Stade Pierre de Coubertin; Level: Super 750; Prize: $600,000; Format: 32MS/32WS/32MD/32WD/32XD	(South Korea) Lee So-hee (South Korea) Shin Seung-chan	(South Korea) Kim So-yeong (South Korea) Kong Hee-yong
26–31 October	(France) French Open (Draw): Host: Paris, France; Venue: Stade Pierre de Coubertin; Level: Super 750; Prize: $600,000; Format: 32MS/32WS/32MD/32WD/32XD	Score: 21–17, 21–12	
26–31 October	(France) French Open (Draw): Host: Paris, France; Venue: Stade Pierre de Coubertin; Level: Super 750; Prize: $600,000; Format: 32MS/32WS/32MD/32WD/32XD	(Japan) Yuta Watanabe (Japan) Arisa Higashino	(Denmark) Mathias Christiansen (Denmark) Alexandra Bøje
26–31 October	(France) French Open (Draw): Host: Paris, France; Venue: Stade Pierre de Coubertin; Level: Super 750; Prize: $600,000; Format: 32MS/32WS/32MD/32WD/32XD	Score: 21–8, 21–17	

=== November ===
Date	Tournament	Champions	Runners-up
2–7 November	(Germany) Hylo Open (Draw): Host: Saarbrücken, Germany; Venue: Saarlandhalle; Level: Super 500; Prize: $400,000; Format: 32MS/32WS/32MD/32WD/32XD	(Singapore) Loh Kean Yew	(Malaysia) Lee Zii Jia
2–7 November	(Germany) Hylo Open (Draw): Host: Saarbrücken, Germany; Venue: Saarlandhalle; Level: Super 500; Prize: $400,000; Format: 32MS/32WS/32MD/32WD/32XD	Score: 19–21, 21–13, 17–12 retired	
2–7 November	(Germany) Hylo Open (Draw): Host: Saarbrücken, Germany; Venue: Saarlandhalle; Level: Super 500; Prize: $400,000; Format: 32MS/32WS/32MD/32WD/32XD	(Thailand) Busanan Ongbamrungphan	(Singapore) Yeo Jia Min
2–7 November	(Germany) Hylo Open (Draw): Host: Saarbrücken, Germany; Venue: Saarlandhalle; Level: Super 500; Prize: $400,000; Format: 32MS/32WS/32MD/32WD/32XD	Score: 21–10, 21–14	
2–7 November	(Germany) Hylo Open (Draw): Host: Saarbrücken, Germany; Venue: Saarlandhalle; Level: Super 500; Prize: $400,000; Format: 32MS/32WS/32MD/32WD/32XD	(Indonesia) Marcus Fernaldi Gideon (Indonesia) Kevin Sanjaya Sukamuljo	(Indonesia) Leo Rolly Carnando (Indonesia) Daniel Marthin
2–7 November	(Germany) Hylo Open (Draw): Host: Saarbrücken, Germany; Venue: Saarlandhalle; Level: Super 500; Prize: $400,000; Format: 32MS/32WS/32MD/32WD/32XD	Score: 21–14, 21–19	
2–7 November	(Germany) Hylo Open (Draw): Host: Saarbrücken, Germany; Venue: Saarlandhalle; Level: Super 500; Prize: $400,000; Format: 32MS/32WS/32MD/32WD/32XD	(Japan) Chisato Hoshi (Japan) Aoi Matsuda	(Japan) Rin Iwanaga (Japan) Kie Nakanishi
2–7 November	(Germany) Hylo Open (Draw): Host: Saarbrücken, Germany; Venue: Saarlandhalle; Level: Super 500; Prize: $400,000; Format: 32MS/32WS/32MD/32WD/32XD	Score: 22–20, 21–18	
2–7 November	(Germany) Hylo Open (Draw): Host: Saarbrücken, Germany; Venue: Saarlandhalle; Level: Super 500; Prize: $400,000; Format: 32MS/32WS/32MD/32WD/32XD	(Thailand) Dechapol Puavaranukroh (Thailand) Sapsiree Taerattanachai	(Indonesia) Praveen Jordan (Indonesia) Melati Daeva Oktavianti
2–7 November	(Germany) Hylo Open (Draw): Host: Saarbrücken, Germany; Venue: Saarlandhalle; Level: Super 500; Prize: $400,000; Format: 32MS/32WS/32MD/32WD/32XD	Score: 22–20, 21–14	
2–7 November	Macau Open (Draw) (cancelled): Host: Macau; Venue: TBD; Level: Super 300; Prize: $170,000; Format: 32MS/32WS/32MD/32WD/32XD		
2–7 November	Macau Open (Draw) (cancelled): Host: Macau; Venue: TBD; Level: Super 300; Prize: $170,000; Format: 32MS/32WS/32MD/32WD/32XD	Score:	
2–7 November	Macau Open (Draw) (cancelled): Host: Macau; Venue: TBD; Level: Super 300; Prize: $170,000; Format: 32MS/32WS/32MD/32WD/32XD	Score:	
2–7 November	Macau Open (Draw) (cancelled): Host: Macau; Venue: TBD; Level: Super 300; Prize: $170,000; Format: 32MS/32WS/32MD/32WD/32XD	Score:	
2–7 November	Macau Open (Draw) (cancelled): Host: Macau; Venue: TBD; Level: Super 300; Prize: $170,000; Format: 32MS/32WS/32MD/32WD/32XD	Score:	
2–7 November	Macau Open (Draw) (cancelled): Host: Macau; Venue: TBD; Level: Super 300; Prize: $170,000; Format: 32MS/32WS/32MD/32WD/32XD	Score:	
9–14 November	Fuzhou China Open (Draw) (cancelled): Host: Fuzhou, China; Venue: Haixia Olympic Sports Center; Level: Super 750; Prize: $750,000; Format: 32MS/32WS/32MD/32WD/32XD		
9–14 November	Fuzhou China Open (Draw) (cancelled): Host: Fuzhou, China; Venue: Haixia Olympic Sports Center; Level: Super 750; Prize: $750,000; Format: 32MS/32WS/32MD/32WD/32XD	Score:	
9–14 November	Fuzhou China Open (Draw) (cancelled): Host: Fuzhou, China; Venue: Haixia Olympic Sports Center; Level: Super 750; Prize: $750,000; Format: 32MS/32WS/32MD/32WD/32XD	Score:	
9–14 November	Fuzhou China Open (Draw) (cancelled): Host: Fuzhou, China; Venue: Haixia Olympic Sports Center; Level: Super 750; Prize: $750,000; Format: 32MS/32WS/32MD/32WD/32XD	Score:	
9–14 November	Fuzhou China Open (Draw) (cancelled): Host: Fuzhou, China; Venue: Haixia Olympic Sports Center; Level: Super 750; Prize: $750,000; Format: 32MS/32WS/32MD/32WD/32XD	Score:	
9–14 November	Fuzhou China Open (Draw) (cancelled): Host: Fuzhou, China; Venue: Haixia Olympic Sports Center; Level: Super 750; Prize: $750,000; Format: 32MS/32WS/32MD/32WD/32XD	Score:	
16–21 November	Indonesia Masters (Draw): Host: Badung Regency, Bali, Indonesia; Venue: Bali International Convention Center; Level: Super 750; Prize: $600,000; Format: 32MS/32WS/32MD/32WD/32XD	(Japan) Kento Momota	(Denmark) Anders Antonsen
16–21 November	Indonesia Masters (Draw): Host: Badung Regency, Bali, Indonesia; Venue: Bali International Convention Center; Level: Super 750; Prize: $600,000; Format: 32MS/32WS/32MD/32WD/32XD	Score: 21–17, 21–11	
16–21 November	Indonesia Masters (Draw): Host: Badung Regency, Bali, Indonesia; Venue: Bali International Convention Center; Level: Super 750; Prize: $600,000; Format: 32MS/32WS/32MD/32WD/32XD	(South Korea) An Se-young	(Japan) Akane Yamaguchi
16–21 November	Indonesia Masters (Draw): Host: Badung Regency, Bali, Indonesia; Venue: Bali International Convention Center; Level: Super 750; Prize: $600,000; Format: 32MS/32WS/32MD/32WD/32XD	Score: 21–17, 21–19	
16–21 November	Indonesia Masters (Draw): Host: Badung Regency, Bali, Indonesia; Venue: Bali International Convention Center; Level: Super 750; Prize: $600,000; Format: 32MS/32WS/32MD/32WD/32XD	(Japan) Takuro Hoki (Japan) Yugo Kobayashi	(Indonesia) Marcus Fernaldi Gideon (Indonesia) Kevin Sanjaya Sukamuljo
16–21 November	Indonesia Masters (Draw): Host: Badung Regency, Bali, Indonesia; Venue: Bali International Convention Center; Level: Super 750; Prize: $600,000; Format: 32MS/32WS/32MD/32WD/32XD	Score: 21–11, 17–21, 21–19	
16–21 November	Indonesia Masters (Draw): Host: Badung Regency, Bali, Indonesia; Venue: Bali International Convention Center; Level: Super 750; Prize: $600,000; Format: 32MS/32WS/32MD/32WD/32XD	(Japan) Nami Matsuyama (Japan) Chiharu Shida	(South Korea) Jeong Na-eun (South Korea) Kim Hye-jeong
16–21 November	Indonesia Masters (Draw): Host: Badung Regency, Bali, Indonesia; Venue: Bali International Convention Center; Level: Super 750; Prize: $600,000; Format: 32MS/32WS/32MD/32WD/32XD	Score: 21–9, 21–11	
16–21 November	Indonesia Masters (Draw): Host: Badung Regency, Bali, Indonesia; Venue: Bali International Convention Center; Level: Super 750; Prize: $600,000; Format: 32MS/32WS/32MD/32WD/32XD	(Thailand) Dechapol Puavaranukroh (Thailand) Sapsiree Taerattanachai	(Hong Kong) Tang Chun Man (Hong Kong) Tse Ying Suet
16–21 November	Indonesia Masters (Draw): Host: Badung Regency, Bali, Indonesia; Venue: Bali International Convention Center; Level: Super 750; Prize: $600,000; Format: 32MS/32WS/32MD/32WD/32XD	Score: 21–11, 21–12	
16–21 November	Hong Kong Open (Draw) (cancelled): Host: Hong Kong; Venue: Hong Kong Coliseum; Level: Super 500; Prize: $400,000; Format: 32MS/32WS/32MD/32WD/32XD		
16–21 November	Hong Kong Open (Draw) (cancelled): Host: Hong Kong; Venue: Hong Kong Coliseum; Level: Super 500; Prize: $400,000; Format: 32MS/32WS/32MD/32WD/32XD	Score:	
16–21 November	Hong Kong Open (Draw) (cancelled): Host: Hong Kong; Venue: Hong Kong Coliseum; Level: Super 500; Prize: $400,000; Format: 32MS/32WS/32MD/32WD/32XD	Score:	
16–21 November	Hong Kong Open (Draw) (cancelled): Host: Hong Kong; Venue: Hong Kong Coliseum; Level: Super 500; Prize: $400,000; Format: 32MS/32WS/32MD/32WD/32XD	Score:	
16–21 November	Hong Kong Open (Draw) (cancelled): Host: Hong Kong; Venue: Hong Kong Coliseum; Level: Super 500; Prize: $400,000; Format: 32MS/32WS/32MD/32WD/32XD	Score:	
16–21 November	Hong Kong Open (Draw) (cancelled): Host: Hong Kong; Venue: Hong Kong Coliseum; Level: Super 500; Prize: $400,000; Format: 32MS/32WS/32MD/32WD/32XD	Score:	
23–28 November	Indonesia Open (Draw): Host: Badung Regency, Bali, Indonesia; Venue: Bali International Convention Center; Level: Super 1000; Prize: $850,000; Format: 32MS/32WS/32MD/32WD/32XD	(Denmark) Viktor Axelsen	(Singapore) Loh Kean Yew
23–28 November	Indonesia Open (Draw): Host: Badung Regency, Bali, Indonesia; Venue: Bali International Convention Center; Level: Super 1000; Prize: $850,000; Format: 32MS/32WS/32MD/32WD/32XD	Score: 21–13, 9–21, 21–13	
23–28 November	Indonesia Open (Draw): Host: Badung Regency, Bali, Indonesia; Venue: Bali International Convention Center; Level: Super 1000; Prize: $850,000; Format: 32MS/32WS/32MD/32WD/32XD	(South Korea) An Se-young	(Thailand) Ratchanok Intanon
23–28 November	Indonesia Open (Draw): Host: Badung Regency, Bali, Indonesia; Venue: Bali International Convention Center; Level: Super 1000; Prize: $850,000; Format: 32MS/32WS/32MD/32WD/32XD	Score: 21–17, 22–20	
23–28 November	Indonesia Open (Draw): Host: Badung Regency, Bali, Indonesia; Venue: Bali International Convention Center; Level: Super 1000; Prize: $850,000; Format: 32MS/32WS/32MD/32WD/32XD	(Indonesia) Marcus Fernaldi Gideon (Indonesia) Kevin Sanjaya Sukamuljo	(Japan) Takuro Hoki (Japan) Yugo Kobayashi
23–28 November	Indonesia Open (Draw): Host: Badung Regency, Bali, Indonesia; Venue: Bali International Convention Center; Level: Super 1000; Prize: $850,000; Format: 32MS/32WS/32MD/32WD/32XD	Score: 21–14, 21–18	
23–28 November	Indonesia Open (Draw): Host: Badung Regency, Bali, Indonesia; Venue: Bali International Convention Center; Level: Super 1000; Prize: $850,000; Format: 32MS/32WS/32MD/32WD/32XD	(Japan) Nami Matsuyama (Japan) Chiharu Shida	(Indonesia) Greysia Polii (Indonesia) Apriyani Rahayu
23–28 November	Indonesia Open (Draw): Host: Badung Regency, Bali, Indonesia; Venue: Bali International Convention Center; Level: Super 1000; Prize: $850,000; Format: 32MS/32WS/32MD/32WD/32XD	Score: 21–19, 21–19	
23–28 November	Indonesia Open (Draw): Host: Badung Regency, Bali, Indonesia; Venue: Bali International Convention Center; Level: Super 1000; Prize: $850,000; Format: 32MS/32WS/32MD/32WD/32XD	(Thailand) Dechapol Puavaranukroh (Thailand) Sapsiree Taerattanachai	(Japan) Yuta Watanabe (Japan) Arisa Higashino
23–28 November	Indonesia Open (Draw): Host: Badung Regency, Bali, Indonesia; Venue: Bali International Convention Center; Level: Super 1000; Prize: $850,000; Format: 32MS/32WS/32MD/32WD/32XD	Score: 21–12, 21–13	

=== December ===
Date	Tournament	Champions	Runners-up
1–5 December	(Indonesia) BWF World Tour Finals (Draw): Host: Badung Regency, Bali, Indonesia; Venue: Bali International Convention Center; Level: World Tour Finals; Prize: $1,500,000; Format: 8MS/8WS/8MD/8WD/8XD	(Denmark) Viktor Axelsen	(Thailand) Kunlavut Vitidsarn
1–5 December	(Indonesia) BWF World Tour Finals (Draw): Host: Badung Regency, Bali, Indonesia; Venue: Bali International Convention Center; Level: World Tour Finals; Prize: $1,500,000; Format: 8MS/8WS/8MD/8WD/8XD	Score: 21–12, 21–8	
1–5 December	(Indonesia) BWF World Tour Finals (Draw): Host: Badung Regency, Bali, Indonesia; Venue: Bali International Convention Center; Level: World Tour Finals; Prize: $1,500,000; Format: 8MS/8WS/8MD/8WD/8XD	(South Korea) An Se-young	(India) P. V. Sindhu
1–5 December	(Indonesia) BWF World Tour Finals (Draw): Host: Badung Regency, Bali, Indonesia; Venue: Bali International Convention Center; Level: World Tour Finals; Prize: $1,500,000; Format: 8MS/8WS/8MD/8WD/8XD	Score: 21–16, 21–12	
1–5 December	(Indonesia) BWF World Tour Finals (Draw): Host: Badung Regency, Bali, Indonesia; Venue: Bali International Convention Center; Level: World Tour Finals; Prize: $1,500,000; Format: 8MS/8WS/8MD/8WD/8XD	(Japan) Takuro Hoki (Japan) Yugo Kobayashi	(Indonesia) Marcus Fernaldi Gideon (Indonesia) Kevin Sanjaya Sukamuljo
1–5 December	(Indonesia) BWF World Tour Finals (Draw): Host: Badung Regency, Bali, Indonesia; Venue: Bali International Convention Center; Level: World Tour Finals; Prize: $1,500,000; Format: 8MS/8WS/8MD/8WD/8XD	Score: 21–16, 13–21, 21–17	
1–5 December	(Indonesia) BWF World Tour Finals (Draw): Host: Badung Regency, Bali, Indonesia; Venue: Bali International Convention Center; Level: World Tour Finals; Prize: $1,500,000; Format: 8MS/8WS/8MD/8WD/8XD	(South Korea) Kim So-yeong (South Korea) Kong Hee-yong	(Japan) Nami Matsuyama (Japan) Chiharu Shida
1–5 December	(Indonesia) BWF World Tour Finals (Draw): Host: Badung Regency, Bali, Indonesia; Venue: Bali International Convention Center; Level: World Tour Finals; Prize: $1,500,000; Format: 8MS/8WS/8MD/8WD/8XD	Score: 21–14, 21–14	
1–5 December	(Indonesia) BWF World Tour Finals (Draw): Host: Badung Regency, Bali, Indonesia; Venue: Bali International Convention Center; Level: World Tour Finals; Prize: $1,500,000; Format: 8MS/8WS/8MD/8WD/8XD	(Thailand) Dechapol Puavaranukroh (Thailand) Sapsiree Taerattanachai	(Japan) Yuta Watanabe (Japan) Arisa Higashino
1–5 December	(Indonesia) BWF World Tour Finals (Draw): Host: Badung Regency, Bali, Indonesia; Venue: Bali International Convention Center; Level: World Tour Finals; Prize: $1,500,000; Format: 8MS/8WS/8MD/8WD/8XD	Score: 21–19, 21–11	

== Statistics ==
=== Performance by countries ===
Below are the 2021 BWF World Tour performances by countries. Only countries who have won a title are listed:

BWF World Tour

Rank	Team	BWTF	Super 1000			Super 750		Super 500	Super 300		Total
Rank	Team	INA	ENG	DEN	INA	FRA	INA	GER	SUI	ESP	Total
1	Japan	1	4	3	1	3	3	1			16
2	South Korea	2			1	2	1				6
3	Indonesia				1			1		4	6
4	Denmark	1		1	1				2		5
5	Thailand	1			1		1	2			5
6	Malaysia		1						1		2
7	France								1	1	2
8	China			1							1
9	Singapore							1			1
10	Spain								1		1

BWF Tour Super 100

Rank	Team	FRA	Total
1	Thailand	2	2
2	Denmark	1	1
2	England	1	1
2	France	1	1

=== Performance by categories ===
Tables were calculated after the MS final (5/5 matches) of the World Tour Finals.

==== Men's singles ====
Rank	Player	BWTF	1000	750	500	300	100	Total
1	(Denmark) Viktor Axelsen	1	2			1		4
2	(France) Toma Junior Popov					1	1	2
3	(Malaysia) Lee Zii Jia		1					1
4	(Japan) Kento Momota			1				1
4	(Japan) Kanta Tsuneyama			1				1
6	(Singapore) Loh Kean Yew				1			1

==== Women's singles ====
Rank	Player	BWTF	1000	750	500	300	100	Total
1	(South Korea) An Se-young	1	1	1				3
2	(Japan) Akane Yamaguchi		1	1				2
3	(Thailand) Busanan Ongbamrungphan				1		1	2
4	(Japan) Nozomi Okuhara		1					1
5	(Indonesia) Putri Kusuma Wardani					1		1
5	(Spain) Carolina Marín					1		1

==== Men's doubles ====
Rank	Player	BWTF	1000	750	500	300	100	Total
1	(Japan) Takuro Hoki	1	1	1				3
1	(Japan) Yugo Kobayashi	1	1	1				3
3	(Indonesia) Marcus Fernaldi Gideon		1		1			2
3	(Indonesia) Kevin Sanjaya Sukamuljo		1		1			2
5	(Japan) Hiroyuki Endo		1					1
5	(Japan) Yuta Watanabe		1					1
7	(South Korea) Ko Sung-hyun			1				1
7	(South Korea) Shin Baek-cheol			1				1
9	(Denmark) Kim Astrup					1		1
9	(Denmark) Anders Skaarup Rasmussen					1		1
9	(Indonesia) Pramudya Kusumawardana					1		1
9	(Indonesia) Yeremia Rambitan					1		1
13	(England) Ben Lane						1	1
13	(England) Sean Vendy						1	1

==== Women's doubles ====
Rank	Player	BWTF	1000	750	500	300	100	Total
1	(Japan) Nami Matsuyama		1	1				2
1	(Japan) Chiharu Shida		1	1				2
3	(South Korea) Kim So-yeong	1						1
3	(South Korea) Kong Hee-yong	1						1
5	(China) Huang Dongping		1					1
5	(China) Zheng Yu		1					1
5	(Japan) Mayu Matsumoto		1					1
5	(Japan) Wakana Nagahara		1					1
9	(South Korea) Lee So-hee			1				1
9	(South Korea) Shin Seung-chan			1				1
11	(Japan) Chisato Hoshi				1			1
11	(Japan) Aoi Matsuda				1			1
13	(Indonesia) Yulfira Barkah					1		1
13	(Indonesia) Febby Valencia Dwijayanti Gani					1		1
13	(Malaysia) Pearly Tan					1		1
13	(Malaysia) Thinaah Muralitharan					1		1
17	(Thailand) Jongkolphan Kititharakul						1	1
17	(Thailand) Rawinda Prajongjai						1	1

==== Mixed doubles ====
Rank	Player	BWTF	1000	750	500	300	100	Total
1	(Thailand) Dechapol Puavaranukroh	1	1	1	1			4
1	(Thailand) Sapsiree Taerattanachai	1	1	1	1			4
3	(Japan) Yuta Watanabe		2	1				3
3	(Japan) Arisa Higashino		2	1				3
5	(France) Thom Gicquel					1		1
5	(France) Delphine Delrue					1		1
5	(Indonesia) Rinov Rivaldy					1		1
5	(Indonesia) Pitha Haningtyas Mentari					1		1
9	(Denmark) Mathias Christiansen						1	1
9	(Denmark) Alexandra Bøje						1	1

== World Tour Finals rankings ==
The points are calculated from the following levels:

- BWF World Tour Super 1000,
- BWF World Tour Super 750,
- BWF World Tour Super 500,
- BWF World Tour Super 300,
- BWF Tour Super 100.

Information on Points, Won, Lost, and % columns were calculated after the 2021 Indonesia Open.

Key

(D)C	(Defending) Champion
F	Finalists
SF	Semi-finalists
QF	Quarter-finalists
#R	Round 1/2/3
RR	Round Robin
Q#	Qualification Round 1/2

=== Men's singles ===
The table below was based on the ranking of men's singles as of 30 November 2021.

Rank		WR	Player	SUI	ENG	FRA	ESP	DEN	FRA	GER	INA	INA	TP	Points	INA		Won	Lost	%
Rank		WR	Player	300	1000	100	300	1000	750	500	750	1000	TP	Points	Eligibility	BWTF	Won	Lost	%
1	▲1	1	(Denmark) Viktor Axelsen	C	F	–	–	C	1R	–	2R	C	6	48,160	Yes	C	23	3	88.46%
2	▼1	8	(Malaysia) Lee Zii Jia	SF	C	–	–	QF	1R	F	1R	1R	7	39,620	Yes	SF	17	7	70.83%
3	Steady	14	(India) Srikanth Kidambi	SF	1R	QF	–	2R	1R	SF	SF	2R	8	37,310	Yes	RR	14	10	58.33%
4	▲4	10	(Denmark) Rasmus Gemke	2R	2R	–	–	1R	2R	QF	QF	SF	7	34,360	Yes	– ^{r}	10	7	58.82%
5	▼1	33	(France) Toma Junior Popov	1R	1R	C	C	1R	1R	2R	2R	1R	9	33,750	Yes	RR	13	10	56.52%
6	▼1	21	(India) Lakshya Sen	1R	QF	–	–	2R	QF	SF	2R	1R	7	32,860	Yes	SF	9	9	50.00%
7	Steady	2	(Japan) Kento Momota	–	QF	–	–	F	SF	–	C	2R	5	32,600	Yes	– ^{r}	15	4	78.95%
8	▼2	23	(Thailand) Kunlavut Vitidsarn	F	1R	SF	–	1R	1R	QF	QF	1R	8	32,550	Yes	F	14	10	58.33%

=== Women's singles ===
The table below was based on the ranking of women's singles as of 30 November 2021.

Rank		WR	Player	SUI	ENG	FRA	ESP	DEN	FRA	GER	INA	INA	TP	Points	INA		Won	Lost	%
Rank		WR	Player	300	1000	100	300	1000	750	500	750	1000	TP	Points	Eligibility	BWTF	Won	Lost	%
1	Steady	10	(Thailand) Pornpawee Chochuwong	SF	F	SF	–	QF	QF	2R	QF	SF	8	49,650	Yes	SF	23	9	71.88%
2	Steady	3	(Japan) Akane Yamaguchi	–	QF	–	–	C	C	–	F	QF	5	45,550	Yes	SF	20	4	83.33%
3	▲1	7	(India) P. V. Sindhu	F	SF	–	–	QF	SF	–	SF	SF	6	44,750	Yes	F	21	8	72.41%
4	▼1	12	(Thailand) Busanan Ongbamrungphan	QF	QF	C	–	2R	QF	C	1R	2R	8	43,460	Yes	RR	18	8	69.23%
5	▲2	6	(South Korea) An Se-young	–	–	–	–	F	SF	–	C	C	4	40,900	Yes	C	20	3	86.96%
6	▼1	19	(Thailand) Phittayaporn Chaiwan	QF	2R	1R	–	2R	1R	SF	SF	QF	8	38,120	No	–	12	8	60.00%
7	▲1	8	(Thailand) Ratchanok Intanon	–	SF	–	–	1R	QF	2R	2R	F	6	35,570	No	–	11	6	64.71%
8	▼2	27	(Denmark) Line Christophersen	QF	2R	F	F	1R	2R	–	1R	1R	8	32,260	Yes	RR	13	10	56.52%
9	▲1	17	(Singapore) Yeo Jia Min	–	–	–	–	1R	QF	F	QF	2R	5	27,700	Yes	– ^{r}	9	5	64.29%
10	▲1	24	(Germany) Yvonne Li	2R	2R	1R	–	1R	2R	1R	2R	2R	8	27,500	Yes	RR	5	11	31.25%

=== Men's doubles ===
The table below was based on the ranking of men's doubles as of 30 November 2021.

Rank		WR	Player	SUI	ENG	FRA	ESP	DEN	FRA	GER	INA	INA	TP	Points	INA		Won	Lost	%
Rank		WR	Player	300	1000	100	300	1000	750	500	750	1000	TP	Points	Eligibility	BWTF	Won	Lost	%
1	Steady	1	(Indonesia) Marcus Fernaldi Gideon	–	2R	–	–	2R	F	C	F	DC	6	49,500	Yes	F	23	5	82.14%
1	Steady	1	(Indonesia) Kevin Sanjaya Sukamuljo	–	2R	–	–	2R	F	C	F	DC	6	49,500	Yes	F	23	5	82.14%
2	▲1	6	(Japan) Takuro Hoki	–	1R	–	–	C	QF	–	C	F	5	42,250	Yes	C	21	3	87.50%
2	▲1	6	(Japan) Yugo Kobayashi	–	1R	–	–	C	QF	–	C	F	5	42,250	Yes	C	21	3	87.50%
3	▼1	10	(Denmark) Kim Astrup	C	SF	–	QF	F	–	–	QF	QF	6	42,100	Yes	RR	18	7	72.00%
3	▼1	10	(Denmark) Anders Skaarup Rasmussen	C	SF	–	QF	F	–	–	QF	QF	6	42,100	Yes	RR	18	7	72.00%
4	Steady	12	(Malaysia) Ong Yew Sin	QF	2R	–	–	QF	QF	1R	SF	QF	7	37,820	Yes	SF	14	9	60.87%
4	Steady	12	(Malaysia) Teo Ee Yi	QF	2R	–	–	QF	QF	1R	SF	QF	7	37,820	Yes	SF	14	9	60.87%
5	Steady	31	(France) Christo Popov	2R	QF	QF	SF	1R	2R	1R	1R	1R	9	32,480	Yes	RR	9	9	50.00%
5	Steady	31	(France) Toma Junior Popov	2R	QF	QF	SF	1R	2R	1R	1R	1R	9	32,480	Yes	RR	9	9	50.00%
6	Steady	27	(Indonesia) Pramudya Kusumawardana	2R	–	–	C	2R	–	SF	QF	2R	5	31,820	Yes	RR	12	4	75.00%
6	Steady	27	(Indonesia) Yeremia Rambitan	2R	–	–	C	2R	–	SF	QF	2R	5	31,820	Yes	RR	12	4	75.00%
7	▲4	9	(India) Satwiksairaj Rankireddy	SF	2R	–	–	2R	QF	–	1R	SF	6	31,610	Yes	– ^{r}	9	6	60.00%
7	▲4	9	(India) Chirag Shetty	SF	2R	–	–	2R	QF	–	1R	SF	6	31,610	Yes	– ^{r}	9	6	60.00%
Olympic gold medalist (wildcard entry)
25	▲5	3	(Chinese Taipei) Lee Yang	–	–	–	–	2R	–	–	QF	2R	3	15,650	Yes	SF	5	5	50.00%
25	▲5	3	(Chinese Taipei) Wang Chi-lin	–	–	–	–	2R	–	–	QF	2R	3	15,650	Yes	SF	5	5	50.00%

=== Women's doubles ===
The table below was based on the ranking of women's doubles as of 30 November 2021.

Rank		WR	Player	SUI	ENG	FRA	ESP	DEN	FRA	GER	INA	INA	TP	Points	INA		Won	Lost	%
Rank		WR	Player	300	1000	100	300	1000	750	500	750	1000	TP	Points	Eligibility	BWTF	Won	Lost	%
1	Steady	9	(Thailand) Jongkolphan Kititharakul	SF	1R	C	–	SF	QF	SF	QF	SF	8	48,720	Yes	RR	18	10	64.29%
1	Steady	9	(Thailand) Rawinda Prajongjai	SF	1R	C	–	SF	QF	SF	QF	SF	8	48,720	Yes	RR	18	10	64.29%
2	▲1	7	(Japan) Nami Matsuyama	–	SF	–	–	1R	SF	–	C	C	5	42,100	Yes	F	18	4	81.82%
2	▲1	7	(Japan) Chiharu Shida	–	SF	–	–	1R	SF	–	C	C	5	42,100	Yes	F	18	4	81.82%
3	▼1	11	(Bulgaria) Gabriela Stoeva	F	2R	F	–	2R	QF	1R	2R	QF	8	39,420	Yes	SF	17	10	62.96%
3	▼1	11	(Bulgaria) Stefani Stoeva	F	2R	F	–	2R	QF	1R	2R	QF	8	39,420	Yes	SF	17	10	62.96%
4	▲3	4	(South Korea) Kim So-yeong	–	–	–	–	SF	F	–	SF	QF	4	32,050	Yes	C	15	4	78.95%
4	▲3	4	(South Korea) Kong Hee-yong	–	–	–	–	SF	F	–	SF	QF	4	32,050	Yes	C	15	4	78.95%
5	▼1	17	(Malaysia) Pearly Tan	C	QF	–	–	1R	2R	–	QF	2R	6	31,770	Yes	RR	12	7	63.16%
5	▼1	17	(Malaysia) Thinaah Muralitharan	C	QF	–	–	1R	2R	–	QF	2R	6	31,770	Yes	RR	12	7	63.16%
6	▼1	13	(England) Chloe Birch	1R	QF	QF	–	1R	QF	1R	2R	2R	8	31,690	Yes	RR	8	11	42.11%
6	▼1	13	(England) Lauren Smith	1R	QF	QF	–	1R	QF	1R	2R	2R	8	31,690	Yes	RR	8	11	42.11%
7	▼1	24	(India) Ashwini Ponnappa	2R	QF	SF	–	1R	1R	2R	2R	1R	8	29,780	Yes	RR	9	10	47.37%
7	▼1	24	(India) N. Sikki Reddy	2R	QF	SF	–	1R	1R	2R	2R	1R	8	29,780	Yes	RR	9	10	47.37%
Olympic gold medalist (wildcard entry)
13	▲12	6	(Indonesia) Greysia Polii	–	–	–	–	QF	–	–	QF	F	3	22,850	Yes	SF	8	5	61.54%
13	▲12	6	(Indonesia) Apriyani Rahayu	–	–	–	–	QF	–	–	QF	F	3	22,850	Yes	SF	8	5	61.54%

=== Mixed doubles ===
The table below was based on the ranking of mixed doubles as of 23 November 2021.

Rank		WR	Player	SUI	ENG	FRA	ESP	DEN	FRA	GER	INA	INA	TP	Points	INA		Won	Lost	%
Rank		WR	Player	300	1000	100	300	1000	750	500	750	1000	TP	Points	Eligibility	BWTF	Won	Lost	%
1	Steady	4	(Japan) Yuta Watanabe	–	C	–	–	C	C	–	SF	F	5	52,900	Yes	F	26	3	89.66%
1	Steady	4	(Japan) Arisa Higashino	–	C	–	–	C	C	–	SF	F	5	52,900	Yes	F	26	3	89.66%
2	Steady	2	(Thailand) Dechapol Puavaranukroh	–	–	–	–	F	SF	C	C	C	5	50,100	Yes	DC	27	2	93.10%
2	Steady	2	(Thailand) Sapsiree Taerattanachai	–	–	–	–	F	SF	C	C	C	5	50,100	Yes	DC	27	2	93.10%
3	▲2	15	(Denmark) Mathias Christiansen	F	2R	C	–	–	F	1R	1R	SF	7	38,880	Yes	RR	18	8	69.23%
3	▲2	15	(Denmark) Alexandra Bøje	F	2R	C	–	–	F	1R	1R	SF	7	38,880	Yes	RR	18	8	69.23%
4	▼1	8	(England) Marcus Ellis	SF	SF	–	–	2R	2R	2R	QF	1R	7	35,070	Yes	RR	11	7	61.11%
4	▼1	8	(England) Lauren Smith	SF	SF	–	–	2R	2R	2R	QF	1R	7	35,070	Yes	RR	11	7	61.11%
5	▲1	12	(Malaysia) Tan Kian Meng	SF	QF	–	–	QF	2R	1R	1R	QF	7	33,900	Yes	RR	10	10	50.00%
5	▲1	12	(Malaysia) Lai Pei Jing	SF	QF	–	–	QF	2R	1R	1R	QF	7	33,900	Yes	RR	10	10	50.00%
6	▲2	9	(Malaysia) Chan Peng Soon	QF	SF	–	–	1R	QF	1R	1R	QF	7	32,780	Yes	SF	11	9	55.00%
6	▲2	9	(Malaysia) Goh Liu Ying	QF	SF	–	–	1R	QF	1R	1R	QF	7	32,780	Yes	SF	11	9	55.00%
7	▲2	7	(Hong Kong) Tang Chun Man	–	–	–	–	QF	SF	1R	F	QF	5	32,470	Yes	SF	13	7	65.00%
7	▲2	7	(Hong Kong) Tse Ying Suet	–	–	–	–	QF	SF	1R	F	QF	5	32,470	Yes	SF	13	7	65.00%
8	▼4	27	(Denmark) Niclas Nøhr	1R	QF	F	F	1R	2R	QF	–	–	7	31,260	No	–	13	7	65.00%
8	▼4	27	(Denmark) Amalie Magelund	1R	QF	F	F	1R	2R	QF	–	–	7	31,260	No	–	13	7	65.00%
9	▲2	5	(Indonesia) Praveen Jordan	–	–	–	–	SF	QF	F	1R	2R	5	29,710	Yes	RR	11	7	61.11%
9	▲2	5	(Indonesia) Melati Daeva Oktavianti	–	–	–	–	SF	QF	F	1R	2R	5	29,710	Yes	RR	11	7	61.11%
