= Badminton at the 2015 SEA Games – Men's singles =

Men's singles at the 2015 SEA Games
- Venue: Singapore Indoor Stadium
- Dates: 13–16 June 2015
- Competitors: 16 from 8 nations

Medalists
gold medal	Chong Wei Feng	Malaysia
silver medal	Mohamad Arif Abdul Latif	Malaysia
bronze medal	Loh Kean Yew	Singapore
bronze medal	Tanongsak Saensomboonsuk	Thailand

The men's singles competition in badminton at the 2015 SEA Games is being held from 13 to 16 June 2015 at the Singapore Indoor Stadium in Kallang, Singapore.

== Schedule ==
All times are Singapore Standard Time (UTC+08:00)

Date	Time	Event
Saturday, 13 June 2015	15:00	Round of 16
Sunday, 14 June 2015	14:10	Quarter-final
Monday, 15 June 2015	15:50	Semi-final
Tuesday, 16 June 2015	10:40	Gold medal match

== Results ==
Source: Results Summary

Round of 16; 13 June 15:00
Tanongsak Saensomboonsuk (THA)	21	21
Meksavang Phommaly (LAO)	11	7
Derek Wong (SIN)	21	21
Phor Rom Cheng (CAM)	10	7
Chong Wei Feng (MAS)	21	21
Phạm Cao Cường (VIE)	14	11
Htoo Aung Myo (MYA)	16	10
Jonatan Christie (INA)	21	21
Phakornkham Fongmalayseng (LAO)	13	9
Mohamad Arif Abdul Latif (MAS)	21	21
Firman Abdul Kholik (INA)	14	13
Boonsak Ponsana (THA)	21	21
Oo Chan Win (MYA)	15	17
Tep Chanmara (CAM)	21	21
Loh Kean Yew (SIN)	21	15	21
Nguyễn Tiến Minh (VIE)	16	21	17

Quarterfinal; 14 June 14:10
Saensomboonsuk (THA)	21	17	21
Wong (SIN)	18	21	13
Chong (MAS)	20	21	21
Christie (INA)	22	19	18
Abdul Latif (MAS)	22	19	21
Ponsana (THA)	20	21	19
Tep (CAM)	7	7
Loh (SIN)	21	21

Semifinal; 15 June 15:50
Saensomboonsuk (THA)	21	18	15
Chong (MAS)	13	21	21
Abdul Latif (MAS)	22	21
Loh (SIN)	20	15

Gold medal match 16 June 10:40
Chong (MAS)	21	21
Abdul Latif (MAS)	8	9

== Final standing ==
Rank	Athlete
1st place, gold medalist(s)	Chong Wei Feng (MAS)
2nd place, silver medalist(s)	Mohamad Arif Abdul Latif (MAS)
3rd place, bronze medalist(s)	Loh Kean Yew (SIN)
3rd place, bronze medalist(s)	Tanongsak Saensomboonsuk (THA)
5-8	Boonsak Ponsana (THA)
5-8	Jonatan Christie (INA)
5-8	Derek Wong (SIN)
5-8	Tep Chanmara (CAM)
9-16	Nguyễn Tiến Minh (VIE)
9-16	Oo Chan Win (MYA)
9-16	Firman Abdul Kholik (INA)
9-16	Htoo Aung Myo (MYA)
9-16	Phạm Cao Cường (VIE)
9-16	Phakornkham Fongmalayseng (LAO)
9-16	Meksavang Phommaly (LAO)
9-16	Phor Rom Cheng (CAM)
