= 2023 Japan Open =

Badminton tournament

Tournament details
- Dates: 25 July – 30 July
- Edition: 42nd
- Level: Super 750
- Total prize money: US$850,000
- Venue: Yoyogi National Gymnasium
- Location: Tokyo, Japan

Champions
- Men's singles: (Denmark) Viktor Axelsen
- Women's singles: (South Korea) An Se-young
- Men's doubles: (Chinese Taipei) Lee Yang (Chinese Taipei) Wang Chi-lin
- Women's doubles: (South Korea) Kim So-yeong (South Korea) Kong Hee-yong
- Mixed doubles: (Japan) Yuta Watanabe (Japan) Arisa Higashino

The 2023 Japan Open (officially known as the Daihatsu Japan Open 2023) was a badminton tournament which took place at Yoyogi National Gymnasium in Tokyo, Japan, from 25 July to 30 July 2023 and had a total purse of $850,000.

== Tournament ==
The 2023 Japan Open was the eighteenth tournament of the 2023 BWF World Tour and also part of the Japan Open championships, which had been held since 1982. This tournament was organized by the Nippon Badminton Association with sanction from the BWF.

=== Venue ===
This international tournament was held at Yoyogi National Gymnasium in Tokyo, Japan.

=== Point distribution ===
Below is the point distribution table for each phase of the tournament based on the BWF points system for the BWF World Tour Super 750 event.

Winner	Runner-up	3/4	5/8	9/16	17/32
11,000	9,350	7,700	6,050	4,320	2,660

=== Prize pool ===
The total prize money was US$850,000 with the distribution of the prize money in accordance with BWF regulations.

Event	Winner	Finalist	Semi-finals	Quarter-finals	Last 16	Last 32
Singles	$59,500	$28,900	$11,900	$4,675	$2,550	$850
Doubles	$62,900	$29,750	$11,900	$5,312.50	$2,762.50	$850

== Men's singles ==
=== Seeds ===
1. (Denmark) Viktor Axelsen (Champion)
2. (Indonesia) Anthony Sinisuka Ginting (First round)
3. (Thailand) Kunlavut Vitidsarn (Quarter-finals)
4. (Japan) Kodai Naraoka (Semi-finals)
5. (Indonesia) Jonatan Christie (Final)
6. (China) Shi Yuqi (Quarter-finals)
7. (Singapore) Loh Kean Yew (First round)
8. (India) Prannoy H. S. (Quarter-finals)

=== Finals ===
Semi-finals
1	(Denmark) Viktor Axelsen	21	21
4	(Japan) Kodai Naraoka	11	11
5	(Indonesia) Jonatan Christie	21	13	21
(India) Lakshya Sen	15	21	16

Final
1	(Denmark) Viktor Axelsen	21	21
5	(Indonesia) Jonatan Christie	7	18

=== Top half ===
==== Section 1 ====
First round
1	(Denmark) V Axelsen	21	21
(Chinese Taipei) Lin C-y	17	10
PFR	(Israel) M Zilberman	15	14
(Indonesia) C A Dwi Wardoyo	21	21
8	(India) Prannoy H. S.	21	21
(China) Li SF	17	13
(India) S Kidambi	21	21
(Chinese Taipei) Chou T-c	13	13

Second round
1	(Denmark) V Axelsen	21	21
(Indonesia) C A Dwi Wardoyo	19	10
8	(India) Prannoy H. S.	19	21	21
(India) S Kidambi	21	9	9

Quarter-finals
1	(Denmark) V Axelsen	19	21	21
8	(India) Prannoy H. S.	21	18	8

==== Section 2 ====
First round
4	(Japan) K Naraoka	21	17	21
(Canada) B Yang	18	21	19
(China) Lu GZ	12	14
(Denmark) A Antonsen	21	21
6	(China) Shi YQ	21	21
(Hong Kong) Ng K L	17	12
(China) Zhao JP	13	15
(Hong Kong) Lee C Y	21	21

Second round
4	(Japan) K Naraoka	18
(Denmark) A Antonsen	18^{r}
6	(China) Shi YQ	21	21
(Hong Kong) Lee C Y	14	17

Quarter-finals
4	(Japan) K Naraoka	11	21	21
6	(China) Shi YQ	21	19	14

=== Bottom half ===
==== Section 3 ====
First round
(China) Weng HY	13	24	21
PFR	(India) M Manjunath	21	22	18
PFR	(Malaysia) Cheam J W	7	9
5	(Indonesia) J Christie	21	21
(Japan) K Nishimoto	20	21	21
(Malaysia) Lee Z J	22	17	19
(Chinese Taipei) Wang T-w	5	16
3	(Thailand) K Vitidsarn	21	21

Second round
(China) Weng HY	15	14
5	(Indonesia) J Christie	21	21
(Japan) K Nishimoto	18	16
3	(Thailand) K Vitidsarn	21	21

Quarter-finals
5	(Indonesia) J Christie	21	21
3	(Thailand) K Vitidsarn	16	16

==== Section 4 ====
First round
(Japan) K Momota	21	16	13
PFR	(Japan) K Watanabe	13	21	21
(Malaysia) Ng T Y	21	21
7	(Singapore) Loh K Y	16	17
(India) P Rajawat	15	21	22
(India) L Sen	21	12	24
(Japan) K Tsuneyama	21	21
2	(Indonesia) A S Ginting	13	18

Second round
PFR	(Japan) K Watanabe	21	21
(Malaysia) Ng T Y	17	14
(India) L Sen	21	21
(Japan) K Tsuneyama	14	16

Quarter-finals
PFR	(Japan) K Watanabe	15	19
(India) L Sen	21	21

== Women's singles ==
=== Seeds ===
1. (Japan) Akane Yamaguchi (Quarter-finals)
2. (South Korea) An Se-young (Champion)
3. (China) Chen Yufei (Second round)
4. (Chinese Taipei) Tai Tzu-ying (Semi-finals)
5. (China) He Bingjiao (Final)
6. (Thailand) Ratchanok Intanon (Quarter-finals)
7. (Indonesia) Gregoria Mariska Tunjung (Semi-finals)
8. (China) Han Yue (Quarter-finals)

=== Finals ===
Semi-finals
7	(Indonesia) Gregoria Mariska Tunjung	21	19	9
5	(China) He Bingjiao	13	21	21
4	(Chinese Taipei) Tai Tzu-ying	17	12
2	(South Korea) An Se-young	21	21

Final
5	(China) He Bingjiao	15	11
2	(South Korea) An Se-young	21	21

=== Top half ===
==== Section 1 ====
First round
1	(Japan) A Yamaguchi	21	21
(India) A Kashyap	17	17
(Japan) N Okuhara	14	10
(South Korea) Kim G-e	21	21
7	(Indonesia) G M Tunjung	21	18	21
(Thailand) P Chochuwong	19	21	18
(Chinese Taipei) Sung S-y	14	21	21
(Chinese Taipei) Pai Y-p	21	17	18

Second round
1	(Japan) A Yamaguchi	21	21
(South Korea) Kim G-e	15	16
7	(Indonesia) G M Tunjung	21	21
(Chinese Taipei) Sung S-y	16	10

Quarter-finals
1	(Japan) A Yamaguchi	11	21	18
7	(Indonesia) G M Tunjung	21	11	21

==== Section 2 ====
First round
3	(China) Chen YF	21	21
(South Korea) Sim Y-j	13	12
PFR	(Belgium) L Tan	13	13
(United States) BW Zhang	21	21
5	(China) He BJ	13	21	21
(Denmark) M Blichfeldt	21	11	19
(Denmark) L Kjærsfeldt	12	19
(China) Wang ZY	21	21

Second round
3	(China) Chen YF	17	22
(United States) BW Zhang	21	24
5	(China) He BJ	21	21
(China) Wang ZY	12	11

Quarter-finals
(United States) BW Zhang	13	18
5	(China) He BJ	21	21

=== Bottom half ===
==== Section 3 ====
First round
(Singapore) Yeo J M	21	18	21
(Malaysia) Goh J W	16	21	17
(Spain) C Azurmendi	8	8
8	(China) Han Y	21	21
(China) Zhang YM	21	21
(India) P. V. Sindhu	12	13
PFR	(Canada) WY Zhang	15	6
4	(Chinese Taipei) Tai T-y	21	21

Second round
(Singapore) Yeo J M	21	14	12
8	(China) Han Y	15	21	21
(China) Zhang YM	10	10
4	(Chinese Taipei) Tai T-y	21	21

Quarter-finals
8	(China) Han Y	12	19
4	(Chinese Taipei) Tai T-y	21	21

==== Section 4 ====
First round
(Thailand) S Katethong	22	21
(Japan) S Kawakami	20	17
(Chinese Taipei) Hsu W-c	9	13
6	(Thailand) R Intanon	21	21
(Japan) A Ohori	21	21
PFR	(India) M Bansod	7	15
(Germany) Y Li	11	7
2	(South Korea) An S-y	21	21

Second round
(Thailand) S Katethong	21	12	16
6	(Thailand) R Intanon	18	21	21
(Japan) A Ohori	12	13
2	(South Korea) An S-y	21	21

Quarter-finals
6	(Thailand) R Intanon	19	10
2	(South Korea) An S-y	21	21

== Men's doubles ==
=== Seeds ===
1. (Indonesia) Fajar Alfian / Muhammad Rian Ardianto (Semi-finals)
2. (China) Liang Weikeng / Wang Chang (Second round)
3. (India) Satwiksairaj Rankireddy / Chirag Shetty (Quarter-finals)
4. (Malaysia) Aaron Chia / Soh Wooi Yik (Quarter-finals)
5. (Japan) Takuro Hoki / Yugo Kobayashi (Final)
6. (Malaysia) Ong Yew Sin / Teo Ee Yi (Second round)
7. (Indonesia) Mohammad Ahsan / Hendra Setiawan (Quarter-finals)
8. (China) Liu Yuchen / Ou Xuanyi (Semi-finals)

=== Finals ===
Semi-finals
1	(Indonesia) Fajar Alfian (Indonesia) Muhammad Rian Ardianto	19	10
(Chinese Taipei) Lee Yang (Chinese Taipei) Wang Chi-lin	21	21
5	(Japan) Takuro Hoki (Japan) Yugo Kobayashi	21	21
8	(China) Liu Yuchen (China) Ou Xuanyi	10	15

Final
(Chinese Taipei) Lee Yang (Chinese Taipei) Wang Chi-lin	21	21
5	(Japan) Takuro Hoki (Japan) Yugo Kobayashi	19	13

=== Top half ===
==== Section 1 ====
First round
1	(Indonesia) F Alfian (Indonesia) M R Ardianto	20	21	21
(China) He JT (China) Zhou HD	22	17	10
(Chinese Taipei) Lu C-y (Chinese Taipei) Yang P-h	21	9	17
(Denmark) K Astrup (Denmark) A S Rasmussen	19	21	21
7	(Indonesia) M Ahsan (Indonesia) H Setiawan	22	21
(South Korea) Kim G-j (South Korea) Kim S-r	20	15
(South Korea) Kang M-h (South Korea) Seo S-j	22	21
(Thailand) S Jomkoh (Thailand) K Kedren	20	11

Second round
1	(Indonesia) F Alfian (Indonesia) M R Ardianto	w	/	o
(Denmark) K Astrup (Denmark) A S Rasmussen
7	(Indonesia) M Ahsan (Indonesia) H Setiawan	12	21	21
(South Korea) Kang M-h (South Korea) Seo S-j	21	10	19

Quarter-finals
1	(Indonesia) F Alfian (Indonesia) M R Ardianto	21	21
7	(Indonesia) M Ahsan (Indonesia) H Setiawan	9	13

==== Section 2 ====
First round
3	(India) S Rankireddy (India) C Shetty	21	11	21
(Indonesia) L R Carnando (Indonesia) D Marthin	16	21	13
(Chinese Taipei) Lee J-h (Chinese Taipei) Yang P-hs	21	16
(Denmark) J Bay (Denmark) L Mølhede	23	21
6	(Malaysia) Ong Y S (Malaysia) Teo E Y	21	21
(France) L Corvée (France) R Labar	15	18
(China) Chen BY (China) Liu Y	17	11
(Chinese Taipei) Lee Y (Chinese Taipei) Wang C-l	21	21

Second round
3	(India) S Rankireddy (India) C Shetty	21	21
(Denmark) J Bay (Denmark) L Mølhede	17	11
6	(Malaysia) Ong Y S (Malaysia) Teo E Y	21	18	16
(Chinese Taipei) Lee Y (Chinese Taipei) Wang C-l	15	21	21

Quarter-finals
3	(India) S Rankireddy (India) C Shetty	15	25	16
(Chinese Taipei) Lee Y (Chinese Taipei) Wang C-l	21	23	21

=== Bottom half ===
==== Section 3 ====
First round
(China) Ren XY (China) Tan Q	21	21
PFR	(Canada) A Dong (Canada) N Yakura	14	15
(England) B Lane (England) S Vendy	16	9
5	(Japan) T Hoki (Japan) Y Kobayashi	21	21
(Indonesia) M S Fikri (Indonesia) B Maulana	21	15	22
(Malaysia) Man W C (Malaysia) Tee K W	11	21	20
(India) M.R. Arjun (India) D Kapila	5^{r}
4	(Malaysia) A Chia (Malaysia) Soh W Y	15

Second round
(China) Ren XY (China) Tan Q	11	21
5	(Japan) T Hoki (Japan) Y Kobayashi	21	23
(Indonesia) M S Fikri (Indonesia) B Maulana	12	10
4	(Malaysia) A Chia (Malaysia) Soh W Y	21	21

Quarter-finals
5	(Japan) T Hoki (Japan) Y Kobayashi	10	21	21
4	(Malaysia) A Chia (Malaysia) Soh W Y	21	15	16

==== Section 4 ====
First round
(Japan) A Endo (Japan) Y Takei	18	15
(Malaysia) Goh S F (Malaysia) N Izzuddin	21	21
PFR	(Japan) K Matsui (Japan) Y Takeuchi	18	23
8	(China) Liu YC (China) Ou XY	21	25
(Chinese Taipei) Su C-h (Chinese Taipei) Ye H-w	19	14
(Japan) A Koga (Japan) T Saito	21	21
(Indonesia) P Kusumawardana (Indonesia) Y Rambitan	21	7	16
2	(China) Liang WK (China) Wang C	16	21	21

Second round
(Malaysia) Goh S F (Malaysia) N Izzuddin	14	17
8	(China) Liu YC (China) Ou XY	21	21
(Japan) A Koga (Japan) T Saito	21	23
2	(China) Liang WK (China) Wang C	16	21

Quarter-finals
8	(China) Liu YC (China) Ou XY	20	22	21
(Japan) A Koga (Japan) T Saito	22	20	14

== Women's doubles ==
=== Seeds ===
1. (China) Chen Qingchen / Jia Yifan (Final)
2. (South Korea) Baek Ha-na / Lee So-hee (Quarter-finals)
3. (China) Zhang Shuxian / Zheng Yu (First round)
4. (South Korea) Kim So-yeong / Kong Hee-yong (Champions)
5. (Japan) Mayu Matsumoto / Wakana Nagahara (Semi-finals)
6. (Indonesia) Apriyani Rahayu / Siti Fadia Silva Ramadhanti (First round)
7. (South Korea) Jeong Na-eun / Kim Hye-jeong (Withdrew)
8. (Japan) Yuki Fukushima / Sayaka Hirota (Semi-finals)

=== Finals ===
Semi-finals
1	(China) Chen Qingchen (China) Jia Yifan	21	21
8	(Japan) Yuki Fukushima (Japan) Sayaka Hirota	19	18
4	(South Korea) Kim So-yeong (South Korea) Kong Hee-yong	14	21	21
5	(Japan) Mayu Matsumoto (Japan) Wakana Nagahara	21	13	10

Final
1	(China) Chen Qingchen (China) Jia Yifan	17	14
4	(South Korea) Kim So-yeong (South Korea) Kong Hee-yong	21	21

=== Top half ===
==== Section 1 ====
First round
1	(China) Chen QC (China) Jia YF	21	21
(Canada) C Choi (Canada) J Wu	14	17
(Malaysia) P Tan (Malaysia) Thinaah M	21	9	21
(China) Liu SS (China) Tan N	11	21	19
6	(Indonesia) A Rahayu (Indonesia) S F S Ramadhanti	12	21	13
(Japan) N Matsuyama (Japan) C Shida	21	16	21
(Japan) S Hobara (Japan) Y Suizu	21	15	14
(India) G Gopichand (India) T Jolly	11	21	21

Second round
1	(China) Chen QC (China) Jia YF	21	21
(Malaysia) P Tan (Malaysia) Thinaah M	15	13
(Japan) N Matsuyama (Japan) C Shida	23	21
(India) G Gopichand (India) T Jolly	21	19

Quarter-finals
1	(China) Chen QC (China) Jia YF	21	21
(Japan) N Matsuyama (Japan) C Shida	19	12

==== Section 2 ====
First round
3	(China) Zhang SX (China) Zheng Y	18	19
(Thailand) J Kititharakul (Thailand) R Prajongjai	21	21
(United States) A Xu (United States) K Xu	17	15
(Japan) R Hirokami (Japan) Y Kato	21	21
8	(Japan) Y Fukushima (Japan) S Hirota	21	21
(China) Li WM (China) Liu XX	17	14
(Japan) R Miyaura (Japan) A Sakuramoto	21	23
(England) C Birch (England) L Smith	13	21

Second round
(Thailand) J Kititharakul (Thailand) R Prajongjai	21	21
(Japan) R Hirokami (Japan) Y Kato	13	19
8	(Japan) Y Fukushima (Japan) S Hirota	23	21
(Japan) R Miyaura (Japan) A Sakuramoto	21	16

Quarter-finals
(Thailand) J Kititharakul (Thailand) R Prajongjai	15	13
8	(Japan) Y Fukushima (Japan) S Hirota	21	21

=== Bottom half ===
==== Section 3 ====
First round
(Chinese Taipei) Lee C-h (Chinese Taipei) Teng C-h	21	21
(Malaysia) V Hoo (Malaysia) Lim C S	13	16
(Indonesia) F D Kusuma (Indonesia) A C Pratiwi	21	21
PFR	(Japan) M Sudo (Japan) N Yamakita	7	13
(Thailand) B Aimsaard (Thailand) N Aimsaard	14	21	21
PFR	(Australia) S Mapasa (Australia) A Yu	21	8	2
(Japan) R Iwanaga (Japan) K Nakanishi	15	12
4	(South Korea) Kim S-y (South Korea) Kong H-y	21	21

Second round
(Chinese Taipei) Lee C-h (Chinese Taipei) Teng C-h	18	18
(Indonesia) F D Kusuma (Indonesia) A C Pratiwi	21	21
(Thailand) B Aimsaard (Thailand) N Aimsaard	9	14
4	(South Korea) Kim S-y (South Korea) Kong H-y	21	21

Quarter-finals
(Indonesia) F D Kusuma (Indonesia) A C Pratiwi	15	16
4	(South Korea) Kim S-y (South Korea) Kong H-y	21	21

==== Section 4 ====
First round
(Hong Kong) Yeung N T (Hong Kong) Yeung P L	22	19	10
(Chinese Taipei) Hsu Y-c (Chinese Taipei) Lin W-c	20	21	21
PFR	(Australia) K Ea (Australia) G Somerville	8	13
5	(Japan) M Matsumoto (Japan) W Nagahara	21	21
(Singapore) Jin YJ (Singapore) C Wong	21	9	20
(Chinese Taipei) Chang C-h (Chinese Taipei) Yang C-t	14	21	22
(South Korea) Lee Y-l (South Korea) Shin S-c	14	18
2	(South Korea) Baek H-n (South Korea) Lee S-h	21	21

Second round
(Chinese Taipei) Hsu Y-c (Chinese Taipei) Lin W-c	6	15
5	(Japan) M Matsumoto (Japan) W Nagahara	21	21
(Chinese Taipei) Chang C-h (Chinese Taipei) Yang C-t	11	5
2	(South Korea) Baek H-n (South Korea) Lee S-h	21	21

Quarter-finals
5	(Japan) M Matsumoto (Japan) W Nagahara	21	21
2	(South Korea) Baek H-n (South Korea) Lee S-h	19	13

== Mixed doubles ==
=== Seeds ===
1. (China) Zheng Siwei / Huang Yaqiong (Semi-finals)
2. (Thailand) Dechapol Puavaranukroh / Sapsiree Taerattanachai (Final)
3. (Japan) Yuta Watanabe / Arisa Higashino (Champions)
4. (China) Feng Yanzhe / Huang Dongping (Semi-finals)
5. (South Korea) Kim Won-ho / Jeong Na-eun (Withdrew)
6. (South Korea) Seo Seung-jae / Chae Yoo-jung (Quarter-finals)
7. (Malaysia) Goh Soon Huat / Shevon Jemie Lai (First round)
8. (France) Thom Gicquel / Delphine Delrue (First round)

=== Finals ===
Semi-finals
1	(China) Zheng Siwei (China) Huang Yaqiong	18	17
3	(Japan) Yuta Watanabe (Japan) Arisa Higashino	21	21
4	(China) Feng Yanzhe (China) Huang Dongping	10	21	19
2	(Thailand) Dechapol Puavaranukroh (Thailand) Sapsiree Taerattanachai	21	19	21

Final
3	(Japan) Yuta Watanabe (Japan) Arisa Higashino	17	21	21
2	(Thailand) Dechapol Puavaranukroh (Thailand) Sapsiree Taerattanachai	21	16	15

=== Top half ===
==== Section 1 ====
First round
1	(China) Zheng SW (China) Huang YQ	21	21
(Japan) H Midorikawa (Japan) N Saito	8	13
(Netherlands) R Tabeling (Netherlands) S Piek	15	18
(Malaysia) Chen T J (Malaysia) Toh E W	21	21
PFR	(India) R Kapoor (India) S Reddy	21	9	18
(Chinese Taipei) Ye H-w (Chinese Taipei) Lee C-h	18	21	21
PFR	(Canada) T A Lindeman (Canada) J Wu	18	18
(United States) V Chiu (United States) J Gai	21	21

Second round
1	(China) Zheng SW (China) Huang YQ	21	21
(Malaysia) Chen T J (Malaysia) Toh E W	11	13
(Chinese Taipei) Ye H-w (Chinese Taipei) Lee C-h	21	21
(United States) V Chiu (United States) J Gai	13	15

Quarter-finals
1	(China) Zheng SW (China) Huang YQ	w	/	o
(Chinese Taipei) Ye H-w (Chinese Taipei) Lee C-h

==== Section 2 ====
First round
3	(Japan) Y Watanabe (Japan) A Higashino	21	21
(Indonesia) P Jordan (Indonesia) M D Oktavianti	13	8
(Indonesia) R N Kusharjanto (Indonesia) L A Kusumawati	15	14
(Hong Kong) Tang C M (Hong Kong) Tse Y S	21	21
8	(France) T Gicquel (France) D Delrue	18	18
(Malaysia) Chan P S (Malaysia) Cheah Y S	21	21
(Chinese Taipei) Yang P-hs (Chinese Taipei) Hu L-f	3	10
(Thailand) S Jomkoh (Thailand) S Paewsampran	21	21

Second round
3	(Japan) Y Watanabe (Japan) A Higashino	19	21	21
(Hong Kong) Tang C M (Hong Kong) Tse Y S	21	12	11
(Malaysia) Chan P S (Malaysia) Cheah Y S	18	21	18
(Thailand) S Jomkoh (Thailand) S Paewsampran	21	19	21

Quarter-finals
3	(Japan) Y Watanabe (Japan) A Higashino	21	21
(Thailand) S Jomkoh (Thailand) S Paewsampran	18	8

=== Bottom half ===
==== Section 3 ====
First round
(Chinese Taipei) Chang K-c (Chinese Taipei) Lee C-c	15	13
(England) M Ellis (England) L Smith	21	21
(South Korea) Ko S-h (South Korea) Eom H-w	21	21
7	(Malaysia) Goh S H (Malaysia) S J Lai	18	11
(Hong Kong) Lee C H (Hong Kong) Ng T Y	21	21
(Japan) Y Kaneko (Japan) M Matsutomo	17	17
(Malaysia) Tan K M (Malaysia) Lai P J	21	15	10
4	(China) Feng YZ (China) Huang DP	14	21	21

Second round
(England) M Ellis (England) L Smith	19	13
(South Korea) Ko S-h (South Korea) Eom H-w	21	21
(Hong Kong) Lee C H (Hong Kong) Ng T Y	19	21	17
4	(China) Feng YZ (China) Huang DP	21	12	21

Quarter-finals
(South Korea) Ko S-h (South Korea) Eom H-w	8	17
4	(China) Feng YZ (China) Huang DP	21	21

==== Section 4 ====
First round
(China) Jiang ZB (China) Wei YX	21	21
(Singapore) T Hee (Singapore) J Tan	12	14
(Indonesia) R Rivaldy (Indonesia) P H Mentari	14	13
6	(South Korea) Seo S-j (South Korea) Chae Y-j	21	21
(Japan) K Yamashita (Japan) N Shinoya	18	17
(Indonesia) D Ferdinansyah (Indonesia) G E Widjaja	21	21
(Denmark) M Christiansen (Denmark) A Bøje	15	18
2	(Thailand) D Puavaranukroh (Thailand) S Taerattanachai	21	21

Second round
(China) Jiang ZB (China) Wei YX	16	13
6	(South Korea) Seo S-j (South Korea) Chae Y-j	21	21
(Indonesia) D Ferdinansyah (Indonesia) G E Widjaja	16	23	12
2	(Thailand) D Puavaranukroh (Thailand) S Taerattanachai	21	21	21

Quarter-finals
6	(South Korea) Seo S-j (South Korea) Chae Y-j	19	4
2	(Thailand) D Puavaranukroh (Thailand) S Taerattanachai	21	21

Preceded by 2023 Korea Open	BWF World Tour; 2023 BWF season	Succeeded by 2023 Australian Open
