= 2024 All England Open =

Badminton tournament in England

Tournament details
- Dates: 12–17 March
- Edition: 114th
- Level: Super 1000
- Total prize money: US$1,300,000
- Venue: Utilita Arena Birmingham
- Location: Birmingham, England

Champions
- Men's singles: (Indonesia) Jonatan Christie
- Women's singles: (Spain) Carolina Marín
- Men's doubles: (Indonesia) Fajar Alfian (Indonesia) Muhammad Rian Ardianto
- Women's doubles: (South Korea) Baek Ha-na (South Korea) Lee So-hee
- Mixed doubles: (China) Zheng Siwei (China) Huang Yaqiong

The 2024 All England Open (officially known as the Yonex All England Open Badminton Championships 2024 for sponsorship reasons) was a badminton tournament that took place at the Utilita Arena Birmingham, Birmingham, England, from 12 to 17 March 2024 and had a total prize of US$1,300,000.

== Tournament ==
The 2024 All England Open was the seventh tournament of the 2024 BWF World Tour and was part of the All England Open championships, which had been held since 1899. This tournament was organized by the Badminton England with sanction from the BWF.

=== Venue ===
This tournament was held at the Utilita Arena Birmingham in Birmingham, England.

=== Point distribution ===
Below is the point distribution table for each phase of the tournament based on the BWF points system for the BWF World Tour Super 1000 event.

| Winner | Runner-up | 3/4 | 5/8 | 9/16 | 17/32 |
|---|---|---|---|---|---|
| 12,000 | 10,200 | 8,400 | 6,600 | 4,800 | 3,000 |

=== Prize pool ===
The total prize money was US$1,300,000 with the distribution of the prize money in accordance with BWF regulations.

| Event | Winner | Finalist | Semi-finals | Quarter-finals | Last 16 | Last 32 |
| Singles | $91,000 | $44,200 | $18,200 | $7,150 | $3,900 | $1,300 |
| Doubles | $96,200 | $45,500 | $18,200 | $8,125 | $4,225 | $1,300 |

== Men's singles ==
=== Seeds ===
1. (Denmark) Viktor Axelsen (quarter-finals)
2. (China) Shi Yuqi (quarter-finals)
3. (China) Li Shifeng (first round)
4. (Denmark) Anders Antonsen (second round)
5. (Indonesia) Anthony Sinisuka Ginting (final)
6. (Japan) Kodai Naraoka (first round)
7. (India) Prannoy H. S. (first round)
8. (Thailand) Kunlavut Vitidsarn (second round)

=== Finals ===
Semi-finals
5 | (Indonesia) Anthony Sinisuka Ginting | 19 | 21 | 21
(France) Christo Popov | 21 | 5 | 11
(India) Lakshya Sen | 12 | 21 | 15
(Indonesia) Jonatan Christie | 21 | 10 | 21

Final
5 | (Indonesia) Anthony Sinisuka Ginting | 15 | 14
(Indonesia) Jonatan Christie | 21 | 21

=== Top half ===
==== Section 1 ====
First round
1 | (Denmark) V Axelsen | 21 | 21
(India) S Kidambi | 9 | 9
(Chinese Taipei) Lin C-y | 21 | 16 | 16
(China) Weng HY | 18 | 21 | 21
5 | (Indonesia) A S Ginting | 21 | 21
(Chinese Taipei) Lee C-h | 13 | 17
(Japan) K Nishimoto | 21 | 21
(Canada) B Yang | 13 | 4

Second round
1 | (Denmark) V Axelsen | 21 | 21
(China) Weng HY | 19 | 14
5 | (Indonesia) A S Ginting | 21 | 21
(Japan) K Nishimoto | 18 | 19

Quarter-finals
1 | (Denmark) V Axelsen | 21 | 18 | 19
5 | (Indonesia) A S Ginting | 8 | 21 | 21

==== Section 2 ====
First round
3 | (China) Li SF | 17 | 13
(France) T J Popov | 21 | 21
(Japan) K Watanabe | 21 | 21
(Chinese Taipei) Wang T-w | 14 | 13
7 | (India) Prannoy H. S. | 21 | 13 | 13
(Chinese Taipei) Su L-y | 14 | 21 | 21
(France) C Popov | 22 | 17 | 21
(Hong Kong) Lee C Y | 20 | 21 | 16

Second round
(France) T J Popov | 18 | 21
(Japan) K Watanabe | 21 | 23
(Chinese Taipei) Su L-y | 14 | 21 | 15
(France) C Popov | 21 | 17 | 21

Quarter-finals
(Japan) K Watanabe | 17 | 10
(France) C Popov | 21 | 21

=== Bottom half ===
==== Section 3 ====
First round
(Singapore) Loh K Y | 21 | 21
(Hong Kong) Ng K L | 12 | 17
(Malaysia) Lee Z J | 21 | 21
6 | (Japan) K Naraoka | 12 | 19
(India) L Sen | 21 | 21
PFR | (Denmark) M Johannesen | 14 | 14
(Japan) K Tsuneyama | 18 | 9
4 | (Denmark) A Antonsen | 21 | 21

Second round
(Singapore) Loh K Y | 15 | 12
(Malaysia) Lee Z J | 21 | 21
(India) L Sen | 24 | 11 | 21
4 | (Denmark) A Antonsen | 22 | 21 | 14

Quarter-finals
(Malaysia) Lee Z J | 22 | 16 | 19
(India) L Sen | 20 | 21 | 21

==== Section 4 ====
First round
(Chinese Taipei) Chou T-c | 4 | 15
(Indonesia) J Christie | 21 | 21
(China) Lu GZ | 21 | 18 | 15
8 | (Thailand) K Vitidsarn | 19 | 21 | 21
(Indonesia) C A Dwi Wardoyo | 21 | 11 | 21
(India) P Rajawat | 19 | 21 | 9
(Denmark) R Gemke | 21 | 21 | 19
2 | (China) Shi YQ | 18 | 23 | 21

Second round
(Indonesia) J Christie | 21 | 18 | 21
8 | (Thailand) K Vitidsarn | 19 | 21 | 13
(Indonesia) C A Dwi Wardoyo | 19 | 10
2 | (China) Shi YQ | 21 | 21

Quarter-finals
(Indonesia) J Christie | 21
2 | (China) Shi YQ | 12^{r}

== Women's singles ==
=== Seeds ===
1. (South Korea) An Se-young (semi-finals)
2. (China) Chen Yufei (quarter-finals)
3. (Chinese Taipei) Tai Tzu-ying (semi-finals)
4. (Japan) Akane Yamaguchi (final)
5. (Spain) Carolina Marín (champion)
6. (China) He Bingjiao (quarter-finals)
7. (Indonesia) Gregoria Mariska Tunjung (quarter-finals)
8. (China) Han Yue (quarter-finals)

=== Finals ===
Semi-finals
1 | (South Korea) An Se-young | 10 | 21 | 14
4 | (Japan) Akane Yamaguchi | 21 | 19 | 21
3 | (Chinese Taipei) Tai Tzu-ying | 13 | 12
5 | (Spain) Carolina Marín | 21 | 21

Final
4 | (Japan) Akane Yamaguchi | 24 | 1^{r}
5 | (Spain) Carolina Marín | 26 | 11

=== Top half ===
==== Section 1 ====
First round
1 | (South Korea) An S-y | 21 | 21
(Chinese Taipei) Hsu W-c | 17 | 16
(Germany) Y Li | 10 | 0^{r}
(India) P. V. Sindhu | 21 | 0
8 | (China) Han Y | 21 | 21
(Thailand) S Katethong | 12 | 19
(Chinese Taipei) Pai Y-p | 21 | 21
(India) A Kashyap | 16 | 11

Second round
1 | (South Korea) An S-y | 21 | 21
(India) P. V. Sindhu | 19 | 11
8 | (China) Han Y | 21 | 22
(Chinese Taipei) Pai Y-p | 12 | 20

Quarter-finals
1 | (South Korea) An S-y | 21 | 21
8 | (China) Han Y | 16 | 19

==== Section 2 ====
First round
4 | (Japan) A Yamaguchi | 21 | 22
(China) Zhang YM | 18 | 20
(Scotland) K Gilmour | 17 | 16
(Thailand) P Chochuwong | 21 | 21
7 | (Indonesia) G M Tunjung | 21 | 21
(Singapore) Yeo J M | 13 | 14
(United States) BW Zhang | 22 | 21
(Denmark) L Kjærsfeldt | 20 | 18

Second round
4 | (Japan) A Yamaguchi | 21 | 9 | 21
(Thailand) P Chochuwong | 17 | 21 | 19
7 | (Indonesia) G M Tunjung | 21 | 24
(United States) BW Zhang | 19 | 22

Quarter-finals
4 | (Japan) A Yamaguchi | 21 | 20 | 21
7 | (Indonesia) G M Tunjung | 10 | 22 | 18

=== Bottom half ===
==== Section 3 ====
First round
(Canada) M Li | 21 | 21
(Denmark) M Blichfeldt | 19 | 15
(Malaysia) Goh J W | 15 | 20
6 | (China) He BJ | 21 | 22
(Thailand) R Intanon | 16 | 18
(South Korea) Kim G-e | 21 | 21
(Japan) N Okuhara | 11 | 16
3 | (Chinese Taipei) Tai T-y | 21 | 21

Second round
(Canada) M Li | 9 | 9
6 | (China) He BJ | 21 | 21
(South Korea) Kim G-e | 17 | 15
3 | (Chinese Taipei) Tai T-y | 21 | 21

Quarter-finals
6 | (China) He BJ | 21 | 16 | 20
3 | (Chinese Taipei) Tai T-y | 16 | 21 | 22

==== Section 4 ====
First round
(China) Wang ZY | 21 | 21
(Japan) A Ohori | 11 | 17
(Chinese Taipei) Sung S-y | 18 | 22
5 | (Spain) C Marín | 21 | 24
(Thailand) B Ongbamrungphan | 17 | 21 | 23
(China) Gao FJ | 21 | 14 | 21
(Vietnam) Nguyễn T L | 16 | 12
2 | (China) Chen YF | 21 | 21

Second round
(China) Wang ZY | 13 | 8
5 | (Spain) C Marín | 21 | 21
(Thailand) B Ongbamrungphan | 20 | 16
2 | (China) Chen YF | 22 | 21

Quarter-finals
5 | (Spain) C Marín | 21 | 21
2 | (China) Chen YF | 17 | 15

== Men's doubles ==
=== Seeds ===
1. (India) Satwiksairaj Rankireddy / Chirag Shetty (second round)
2. (China) Liang Weikeng / Wang Chang (second round)
3. (South Korea) Kang Min-hyuk / Seo Seung-jae (first round)
4. (Denmark) Kim Astrup / Anders Skaarup Rasmussen (second round)
5. (Malaysia) Aaron Chia / Soh Wooi Yik (final)
6. (Japan) Takuro Hoki / Yugo Kobayashi (semi-finals)
7. (Indonesia) Fajar Alfian / Muhammad Rian Ardianto (champions)
8. (China) Liu Yuchen / Ou Xuanyi (second round)

=== Finals ===
Semi-finals
5 | (Malaysia) Aaron Chia (Malaysia) Soh Wooi Yik | 21 | 21
(Chinese Taipei) Lee Jhe-huei (Chinese Taipei) Yang Po-hsuan | 16 | 15
6 | (Japan) Takuro Hoki (Japan) Yugo Kobayashi | 18 | 18
7 | (Indonesia) Fajar Alfian (Indonesia) Muhammad Rian Ardianto | 21 | 21

Final
5 | (Malaysia) Aaron Chia (Malaysia) Soh Wooi Yik | 16 | 16
7 | (Indonesia) Fajar Alfian (Indonesia) Muhammad Rian Ardianto | 21 | 21

=== Top half ===
==== Section 1 ====
First round
1 | (India) S Rankireddy (India) C Shetty | 21 | 21
(Indonesia) M Ahsan (Indonesia) H Setiawan | 18 | 14
(Indonesia) M S Fikri (Indonesia) B Maulana | 21 | 21
(Scotland) A Dunn (Scotland) A Hall | 18 | 16
5 | (Malaysia) A Chia (Malaysia) Soh W Y | 21 | 21
(Malaysia) Goh S F (Malaysia) N Izzuddin | 19 | 17
(Chinese Taipei) Chang K-c (Chinese Taipei) Po L-w | 21 | 21
(Canada) K Lee (Canada) T A Lindeman | 10 | 14

Second round
1 | (India) S Rankireddy (India) C Shetty | 16 | 15
(Indonesia) M S Fikri (Indonesia) B Maulana | 21 | 21
5 | (Malaysia) A Chia (Malaysia) Soh W Y | 21 | 24
(Chinese Taipei) Chang K-c (Chinese Taipei) Po L-w | 18 | 22

Quarter-finals
(Indonesia) M S Fikri (Indonesia) B Maulana | 14 | 11
5 | (Malaysia) A Chia (Malaysia) Soh W Y | 21 | 21

==== Section 2 ====
First round
4 | (Denmark) K Astrup (Denmark) A S Rasmussen | 21 | 21
(France) C Popov (France) T J Popov | 16 | 13
(Thailand) S Jomkoh (Thailand) K Kedren | 26 | 21
(France) L Corvée (France) R Labar | 24 | 12
8 | (China) Liu YC (China) Ou XY | 15 | 23 | 21
(Malaysia) Ong Y S (Malaysia) Teo E Y | 21 | 21 | 14
(United States) V Chiu (United States) J Yuan | 6 | 16
(Chinese Taipei) Lee J-h (Chinese Taipei) Yang P-hs | 21 | 21

Second round
4 | (Denmark) K Astrup (Denmark) A S Rasmussen | 12 | 21 | 19
(Thailand) S Jomkoh (Thailand) K Kedren | 21 | 5 | 21
8 | (China) Liu YC (China) Ou XY | 18 | 16
(Chinese Taipei) Lee J-h (Chinese Taipei) Yang P-hs | 21 | 21

Quarter-finals
(Thailand) S Jomkoh (Thailand) K Kedren | 13 | 17
(Chinese Taipei) Lee J-h (Chinese Taipei) Yang P-hs | 21 | 21

=== Bottom half ===
==== Section 3 ====
First round
(Czech Republic) O Král (Czech Republic) A Mendrek | 20 | 10
(Japan) K Mitsuhashi (Japan) H Okamura | 22 | 21
(England) B Lane (England) S Vendy | 9 | 19
6 | (Japan) T Hoki (Japan) Y Kobayashi | 21 | 21
(Denmark) R Kjær (Denmark) F Søgaard | 21 | 21
(Chinese Taipei) Lu C-y (Chinese Taipei) Yang P-ha | 17 | 18
(China) He JT (China) Ren XY | 21 | 21
3 | (South Korea) Kang M-h (South Korea) Seo S-j | 14 | 13

Second round
(Japan) K Mitsuhashi (Japan) H Okamura | 18 | 12
6 | (Japan) T Hoki (Japan) Y Kobayashi | 21 | 21
(Denmark) R Kjær (Denmark) F Søgaard | 15 | 12
(China) He JT (China) Ren XY | 21 | 21

Quarter-finals
6 | (Japan) T Hoki (Japan) Y Kobayashi | 14 | 21 | 21
(China) He JT (China) Ren XY | 21 | 15 | 9

==== Section 4 ====
First round
(Japan) A Koga (Japan) T Saito | 23 | 21
(Malaysia) Man W C (Malaysia) Tee K W | 21 | 18
(Chinese Taipei) Lee F-c (Chinese Taipei) Lee F-j | 13 | 9
7 | (Indonesia) F Alfian (Indonesia) M R Ardianto | 21 | 21
(Indonesia) L R Carnando (Indonesia) D Marthin | 19 | 19
(Chinese Taipei) Lee Y (Chinese Taipei) Wang C-l | 21 | 21
(Canada) A Dong (Canada) N Yakura | 14 | 15
2 | (China) Liang WK (China) Wang C | 21 | 21

Second round
(Japan) A Koga (Japan) T Saito | 21 | 17 | 18
7 | (Indonesia) F Alfian (Indonesia) M R Ardianto | 18 | 21 | 21
(Chinese Taipei) Lee Y (Chinese Taipei) Wang C-l | 22 | 19 | 21
2 | (China) Liang WK (China) Wang C | 20 | 21 | 16

Quarter-finals
7 | (Indonesia) F Alfian (Indonesia) M R Ardianto | 21 | 24
(Chinese Taipei) Lee Y (Chinese Taipei) Wang C-l | 14 | 22

== Women's doubles ==
=== Seeds ===
1. (China) Chen Qingchen / Jia Yifan (second round)
2. (South Korea) Baek Ha-na / Lee So-hee (champions)
3. (South Korea) Kim So-yeong / Kong Hee-yong (semi-finals)
4. (China) Liu Shengshu / Tan Ning (second round)
5. (China) Zhang Shuxian / Zheng Yu (quarter-finals)
6. (Japan) Nami Matsuyama / Chiharu Shida (final)
7. (Japan) Yuki Fukushima / Sayaka Hirota (quarter-finals)
8. (Japan) Mayu Matsumoto / Wakana Nagahara (first round)

=== Finals ===
Semi-finals
(Japan) Rena Miyaura (Japan) Ayako Sakuramoto | 15 | 12
6 | (Japan) Nami Matsuyama (Japan) Chiharu Shida | 21 | 21
3 | (South Korea) Kim So-yeong (South Korea) Kong Hee-yong | 17 | 21 | 16
2 | (South Korea) Baek Ha-na (South Korea) Lee So-hee | 21 | 18 | 21

Final
6 | (Japan) Nami Matsuyama (Japan) Chiharu Shida | 19 | 21 | 17
2 | (South Korea) Baek Ha-na (South Korea) Lee So-hee | 21 | 11 | 21

=== Top half ===
==== Section 1 ====
First round
1 | (China) Chen QC (China) Jia YF | 21 | 15 | 21
(Chinese Taipei) Hsu Y-c (Chinese Taipei) Lin W-c | 10 | 21 | 16
(Malaysia) V Hoo (Malaysia) Lim C S | 10 | 10
(Malaysia) P Tan (Malaysia) Thinaah M | 21 | 21
8 | (Japan) M Matsumoto (Japan) W Nagahara | 15 | 21 | 15
(Japan) R Miyaura (Japan) A Sakuramoto | 21 | 17 | 21
(Indonesia) A Rahayu (Indonesia) S F S Ramadhanti | 21 | 21
(India) T Jolly (India) G Gopichand | 18 | 12

Second round
1 | (China) Chen QC (China) Jia YF | 20 | 16
(Malaysia) P Tan (Malaysia) Thinaah M | 22 | 21
(Japan) R Miyaura (Japan) A Sakuramoto | 14 | 21 | 21
(Indonesia) A Rahayu (Indonesia) S F S Ramadhanti | 21 | 10 | 16

Quarter-finals
(Malaysia) P Tan (Malaysia) Thinaah M | 21 | 18 | 18
(Japan) R Miyaura (Japan) A Sakuramoto | 11 | 21 | 21

==== Section 2 ====
First round
4 | (China) Liu SS (China) Tan N | 21 | 21
(China) Li WM (China) Liu XX | 15 | 19
(Chinese Taipei) Lee C-h (Chinese Taipei) Teng C-h | 18 | 12
(Thailand) B Aimsaard (Thailand) N Aimsaard | 21 | 21
6 | (Japan) N Matsuyama (Japan) C Shida | 21 | 21
(Thailand) J Kititharakul (Thailand) R Prajongjai | 16 | 14
(United States) P L Cao Hok (United States) L Lam | 21 | 21
(Canada) J Chow (Canada) E Zhang | 13 | 10

Second round
4 | (China) Liu SS (China) Tan N | 16 | 21
(Thailand) B Aimsaard (Thailand) N Aimsaard | 21 | 23
6 | (Japan) N Matsuyama (Japan) C Shida | 21 | 21
(United States) P L Cao Hok (United States) L Lam | 7 | 5

Quarter-finals
(Thailand) B Aimsaard (Thailand) N Aimsaard | 0^{r}
6 | (Japan) N Matsuyama (Japan) C Shida | 6

=== Bottom half ===
==== Section 3 ====
First round
(India) T Crasto (India) A Ponnappa | 21 | 21
(Hong Kong) Yeung N T (Hong Kong) Yeung P L | 13 | 18
(South Korea) Jeong N-e (South Korea) Kim H-j | 12 | 20
5 | (China) Zhang SX (China) Zheng Y | 21 | 22
(United States) A Xu (United States) K Xu | 21 | 17 | 16
(Canada) C Choi (Canada) J Wu | 14 | 21 | 21
(China) Li YJ (China) Luo XM | 14 | 5^{r}
3 | (South Korea) Kim S-y (South Korea) Kong H-y | 21 | 4

Second round
(India) T Crasto (India) A Ponnappa | 21 | 11 | 11
5 | (China) Zhang SX (China) Zheng Y | 11 | 21 | 21
(Canada) C Choi (Canada) J Wu | 9 | 11
3 | (South Korea) Kim S-y (South Korea) Kong H-y | 21 | 21

Quarter-finals
5 | (China) Zhang SX (China) Zheng Y | 21 | 18 | 18
3 | (South Korea) Kim S-y (South Korea) Kong H-y | 15 | 21 | 21

==== Section 4 ====
First round
(Netherlands) D Jille (Netherlands) C Seinen | 18 | 16
(Australia) S Mapasa (Australia) A Yu | 21 | 21
(Denmark) M Fruergaard (Denmark) S Thygesen | 21 | 19 | 13
7 | (Japan) Y Fukushima (Japan) S Hirota | 15 | 21 | 21
(Japan) R Iwanaga (Japan) K Nakanishi | 21 | 21
(India) R Panda (India) S Panda | 9 | 9
(United States) F Corbett (United States) A Lee | 8 | 20
2 | (South Korea) Baek H-n (South Korea) Lee S-h | 21 | 22

Second round
(Australia) S Mapasa (Australia) A Yu | 17 | 21 | 19
7 | (Japan) Y Fukushima (Japan) S Hirota | 21 | 19 | 21
(Japan) R Iwanaga (Japan) K Nakanishi | 16 | 14
2 | (South Korea) Baek H-n (South Korea) Lee S-h | 21 | 21

Quarter-finals
7 | (Japan) Y Fukushima (Japan) S Hirota | 16 | 15
2 | (South Korea) Baek H-n (South Korea) Lee S-h | 21 | 21

== Mixed doubles ==
=== Seeds ===
1. (China) Zheng Siwei / Huang Yaqiong (champions)
2. (Japan) Yuta Watanabe / Arisa Higashino (final)
3. (South Korea) Seo Seung-jae / Chae Yoo-jung (first round)
4. (China) Feng Yanzhe / Huang Dongping (semi-finals)
5. (China) Jiang Zhenbang / Wei Yaxin (first round)
6. (Thailand) Dechapol Puavaranukroh / Sapsiree Taerattanachai (first round)
7. (South Korea) Kim Won-ho / Jeong Na-eun (quarter-finals)
8. (Hong Kong) Tang Chun Man / Tse Ying Suet (quarter-finals)

=== Finals ===
Semi-finals
1 | (China) Zheng Siwei (China) Huang Yaqiong | 21 | 21
4 | (China) Feng Yanzhe (China) Huang Dongping | 14 | 13
(Netherlands) Robin Tabeling (Netherlands) Selena Piek | 14 | 16
2 | (Japan) Yuta Watanabe (Japan) Arisa Higashino | 21 | 21

Final
1 | (China) Zheng Siwei (China) Huang Yaqiong | 21 | 21
2 | (Japan) Yuta Watanabe (Japan) Arisa Higashino | 16 | 11

=== Top half ===
==== Section 1 ====
First round
1 | (China) Zheng SW (China) Huang YQ | 21 | 21
(United States) V Chiu (United States) J Gai | 6 | 11
(Japan) H Midorikawa (Japan) N Saito | 24 | 14 | 14
(Denmark) M Christiansen (Denmark) A Bøje | 22 | 21 | 21
5 | (China) Jiang ZB (China) Wei YX | 10 | 16
(Indonesia) D Ferdinansyah (Indonesia) G E Widjaja | 21 | 21
(England) G Mairs (England) J Mairs | 21 | 16 | 20
(England) M Ellis (England) L Smith | 19 | 21 | 22

Second round
1 | (China) Zheng SW (China) Huang YQ | 21 | 21
(Denmark) M Christiansen (Denmark) A Bøje | 16 | 17
(Indonesia) D Ferdinansyah (Indonesia) G E Widjaja | 21 | 21
(England) M Ellis (England) L Smith | 17 | 9

Quarter-finals
1 | (China) Zheng SW (China) Huang YQ | 21 | 21
(Indonesia) D Ferdinansyah (Indonesia) G E Widjaja | 11 | 19

==== Section 2 ====
First round
4 | (China) Feng YZ (China) Huang DP | 21 | 21
(Australia) K Choo (Australia) G Somerville | 12 | 11
(Malaysia) Goh S H (Malaysia) S J Lai | 21 | 26
(Chinese Taipei) Chang K-c (Chinese Taipei) Lee C-c | 17 | 24
8 | (Hong Kong) Tang C M (Hong Kong) Tse Y S | 21 | 19 | 21
(Indonesia) R N Kusharjanto (Indonesia) L A Kusumawati | 14 | 21 | 18
(Malaysia) Tan K M (Malaysia) Lai P J | 12 | 21 | 21
(France) T Gicquel (France) D Delrue | 21 | 19 | 14

Second round
4 | (China) Feng YZ (China) Huang DP | 21 | 21
(Malaysia) Goh S H (Malaysia) S J Lai | 12 | 5
8 | (Hong Kong) Tang C M (Hong Kong) Tse Y S | 21 | 21
(Malaysia) Tan K M (Malaysia) Lai P J | 17 | 11

Quarter-finals
4 | (China) Feng YZ (China) Huang DP | 21 | 21
8 | (Hong Kong) Tang C M (Hong Kong) Tse Y S | 15 | 8

=== Bottom half ===
==== Section 3 ====
First round
(Denmark) M Thyrri (Denmark) A Magelund | 21 | 13 | 22
(Netherlands) R Tabeling (Netherlands) S Piek | 14 | 21 | 24
(Malaysia) Chen T J (Malaysia) Toh E W | 21 | 12 | 21
6 | (Thailand) D Puavaranukroh (Thailand) S Taerattanachai | 14 | 21 | 15
(Thailand) S Jomkoh (Thailand) S Paewsampran | 21 | 19 | 21
(Thailand) R Oupthong (Thailand) J Sudjaipraparat | 16 | 21 | 14
(Chinese Taipei) Ye H-w (Chinese Taipei) Lee C-h | 21 | 21
3 | (South Korea) Seo S-j (South Korea) Chae Y-j | 17 | 10

Second round
(Netherlands) R Tabeling (Netherlands) S Piek | 17 | 21 | 21
(Malaysia) Chen T J (Malaysia) Toh E W | 21 | 19 | 16
(Thailand) S Jomkoh (Thailand) S Paewsampran | 19 | 15
(Chinese Taipei) Ye H-w (Chinese Taipei) Lee C-h | 21 | 21

Quarter-finals
(Netherlands) R Tabeling (Netherlands) S Piek | 11 | 21 | 21
(Chinese Taipei) Ye H-w (Chinese Taipei) Lee C-h | 21 | 19 | 19

==== Section 4 ====
First round
(Singapore) T Hee (Singapore) J Tan | 23 | 19 | 21
(Chinese Taipei) Yang P-hs (Chinese Taipei) Hu L-f | 21 | 21 | 12
(Canada) T A Lindeman (Canada) J Wu | 14 | 16
7 | (South Korea) Kim W-h (South Korea) Jeong N-e | 21 | 21
(Japan) Y Kaneko (Japan) M Matsutomo | 19 | 15
(Hong Kong) Lee C H (Hong Kong) Ng T Y | 21 | 21
(Japan) K Yamashita (Japan) N Shinoya | 12 | 16
2 | (Japan) Y Watanabe (Japan) A Higashino | 21 | 21

Second round
(Singapore) T Hee (Singapore) J Tan | 14 | 15
7 | (South Korea) Kim W-h (South Korea) Jeong N-e | 21 | 21
(Hong Kong) Lee C H (Hong Kong) Ng T Y | 19 | 12
2 | (Japan) Y Watanabe (Japan) A Higashino | 21 | 21

Quarter-finals
7 | (South Korea) Kim W-h (South Korea) Jeong N-e | 15 | 17
2 | (Japan) Y Watanabe (Japan) A Higashino | 21 | 21

| Preceded by 2024 French Open | BWF World Tour; 2024 BWF season | Succeeded by 2024 Swiss Open; 2024 Ruichang China Masters |
