= 2024 French Open (badminton) =

Badminton tournament in France

Tournament details
- Dates: 5–10 March
- Edition: 92nd
- Level: Super 750
- Total prize money: US$850,000
- Venue: Adidas Arena
- Location: Paris, France

Champions
- Men's singles: (China) Shi Yuqi
- Women's singles: (South Korea) An Se-young
- Men's doubles: (India) Satwiksairaj Rankireddy (India) Chirag Shetty
- Women's doubles: (China) Chen Qingchen (China) Jia Yifan
- Mixed doubles: (China) Feng Yanzhe (China) Huang Dongping

The 2024 French Open (officially known as the Yonex Internationaux de France de Badminton 2024 for sponsorship reasons) was a badminton tournament that took place at the Adidas Arena, Paris, France, from 5 to 10 March 2024 and had a total prize of US$850,000.

== Tournament ==
The 2024 French Open was the sixth tournament of the 2024 BWF World Tour and was part of the French Open championships, which had been held since 1908. This tournament was organized by the French Badminton Federation with sanction from the BWF.

=== Venue ===
This tournament was held at the Adidas Arena in Paris, France.

=== Point distribution ===
Below is the point distribution table for each phase of the tournament based on the BWF points system for the BWF World Tour Super 750 event.

Winner	Runner-up	3/4	5/8	9/16	17/32
11,000	9,350	7,700	6,050	4,320	2,660

=== Prize pool ===
The total prize money is US$850,000 with the distribution of the prize money in accordance with BWF regulations.

Event	Winner	Finalist	Semi-finals	Quarter-finals	Last 16	Last 32
Singles	$59,500	$28,900	$11,900	$4,675	$2,550	$850
Doubles	$62,900	$29,750	$11,900	$5,312.5	$2,762.5	$850

== Men's singles ==
=== Seeds ===
1. (Denmark) Viktor Axelsen (second round)
2. (China) Shi Yuqi (champion)
3. (China) Li Shifeng (second round)
4. (Denmark) Anders Antonsen (quarter-finals)
5. (Indonesia) Anthony Sinisuka Ginting (second round)
6. (Japan) Kodai Naraoka (first round)
7. (India) Prannoy H. S. (first round)
8. (Thailand) Kunlavut Vitidsarn (final)

=== Finals ===
Semi-finals
8	(Thailand) Kunlavut Vitidsarn	20	21	21
(India) Lakshya Sen	22	13	11
(Indonesia) Chico Aura Dwi Wardoyo	19	14
2	(China) Shi Yuqi	21	21

Final
8	(Thailand) Kunlavut Vitidsarn	20	19
2	(China) Shi Yuqi	22	21

=== Top half ===
==== Section 1 ====
First round
1	(Denmark) V Axelsen	21	21
(India) P Rajawat	8	15
(Chinese Taipei) Wang T-w	12	23	21
(Indonesia) J Christie	21	21	17
8	(Thailand) K Vitidsarn	21	13	22
(Canada) B Yang	13	21	20
(Japan) K Nishimoto	21	15	5
(Chinese Taipei) Lin C-y	16	21	21

Second round
1	(Denmark) V Axelsen	13	17
(Chinese Taipei) Wang T-w	21	21
8	(Thailand) K Vitidsarn	21	9	21
(Chinese Taipei) Lin C-y	13	21	14

Quarter-finals
(Chinese Taipei) Wang T-w	18	16
8	(Thailand) K Vitidsarn	21	21

==== Section 2 ====
First round
3	(China) Li SF	21	21
(Japan) K Watanabe	11	17
(India) L Sen	15	21	21
(Japan) K Tsuneyama	21	15	3
5	(Indonesia) A S Ginting	7	21	21
(China) Weng HY	21	18	15
(France) T J Popov	14	21
(Singapore) Loh K Y	21	23

Second round
3	(China) Li SF	21	15	13
(India) L Sen	16	21	21
5	(Indonesia) A S Ginting	16	21	16
(Singapore) Loh K Y	21	18	21

Quarter-finals
(India) L Sen	19	21	21
(Singapore) Loh K Y	21	15	13

=== Bottom half ===
==== Section 3 ====
First round
PFR	(China) Zhao JP	12	15
(Chinese Taipei) Su L-y	21	21
(Indonesia) C A Dwi Wardoyo	14	22	21
6	(Japan) K Naraoka	21	20	17
(Hong Kong) Lee C Y	15	9
(Hong Kong) Ng K L	21	21
PFR	(Chinese Taipei) Lee C-h	16	13
4	(Denmark) A Antonsen	21	21

Second round
(Chinese Taipei) Su L-y	18	21	16
(Indonesia) C A Dwi Wardoyo	21	17	21
(Hong Kong) Ng K L	16	19
4	(Denmark) A Antonsen	21	21

Quarter-finals
(Indonesia) C A Dwi Wardoyo	21	21
4	(Denmark) A Antonsen	15	8

==== Section 4 ====
First round
(India) S Kidambi	21	20	21
(Chinese Taipei) Chou T-c	15	22	8
(China) Lu GZ	21	21
7	(India) Prannoy H. S.	17	17
(Denmark) M Johannesen	21	21
(Malaysia) Lee Z J	15	19
(France) C Popov	14	15
2	(China) Shi YQ	21	21

Second round
(India) S Kidambi	21	12	20
(China) Lu GZ	19	21	22
(Denmark) M Johannesen	10	14
2	(China) Shi YQ	21	21

Quarter-finals
(China) Lu GZ	15	15
2	(China) Shi YQ	21	21

== Women's singles ==
=== Seeds ===
1. (South Korea) An Se-young (champion)
2. (China) Chen Yufei (semi-finals)
3. (Chinese Taipei) Tai Tzu-ying (semi-finals)
4. (Japan) Akane Yamaguchi (final)
5. (Spain) Carolina Marín (first round)
6. (China) He Bingjiao (quarter-finals)
7. (Indonesia) Gregoria Mariska Tunjung (second round)
8. (China) Han Yue (second round)

=== Finals ===
Semi-finals
1	(South Korea) An Se-young	21	17	22
3	(Chinese Taipei) Tai Tzu-ying	12	21	20
4	(Japan) Akane Yamaguchi	21	18	22
2	(China) Chen Yufei	15	21	20

Final
1	(South Korea) An Se-young	18	21	21
4	(Japan) Akane Yamaguchi	21	13	10

=== Top half ===
==== Section 1 ====
First round
1	(South Korea) An S-y	21	21
(Thailand) P Chochuwong	10	8
(Chinese Taipei) Hsu W-c	21	21
(Vietnam) Nguyễn T L	16	12
6	(China) He BJ	21	21
(Denmark) M Blichfeldt	18	10
(Scotland) K Gilmour	21	19	18
(Thailand) B Ongbamrungphan	13	21	21

Second round
1	(South Korea) An S-y	21	21
(Chinese Taipei) Hsu W-c	19	11
6	(China) He BJ	21	21
(Thailand) B Ongbamrungphan	17	19

Quarter-finals
1	(South Korea) An S-y	21	21
6	(China) He BJ	18	16

==== Section 2 ====
First round
3	(Chinese Taipei) Tai T-y	21	21
(Chinese Taipei) Sung S-y	16	7
(China) Wang ZY	21	21
(Malaysia) Goh J W	10	14
7	(Indonesia) G M Tunjung	21	12	21
(South Korea) Kim G-e	16	21	14
(Japan) N Okuhara	21	19	14
(Japan) A Ohori	17	21	21

Second round
3	(Chinese Taipei) Tai T-y	21	21
(China) Wang ZY	19	10
7	(Indonesia) G M Tunjung	17	16
(Japan) A Ohori	21	21

Quarter-finals
3	(Chinese Taipei) Tai T-y	21	21
(Japan) A Ohori	17	10

=== Bottom half ===
==== Section 3 ====
First round
(China) Zhang YM	18	21	21
(Thailand) S Katethong	21	18	14
PFR	(Myanmar) Thet Htar T	14	8
8	(China) Han Y	21	21
(Germany) Y Li	14	21	21
(Denmark) L Kjærsfeldt	21	10	12
(China) Gao FJ	17	12
4	(Japan) A Yamaguchi	21	21

Second round
(China) Zhang YM	21	21
8	(China) Han Y	19	15
(Germany) Y Li	15	12
4	(Japan) A Yamaguchi	21	21

Quarter-finals
(China) Zhang YM	14	16
4	(Japan) A Yamaguchi	21	21

==== Section 4 ====
First round
(Canada) M Li	22	20	19
(India) P. V. Sindhu	20	22	21
(United States) BW Zhang	14	21	21
5	(Spain) C Marín	21	16	17
(Denmark) L Christophersen	18	21	21
(Chinese Taipei) Pai Y-p	21	16	18
(Thailand) R Intanon	21	18	10
2	(China) Chen YF	10	21	21

Second round
(India) P. V. Sindhu	13	21	21
(United States) BW Zhang	21	10	14
(Denmark) L Christophersen	20	18
2	(China) Chen YF	22	21

Quarter-finals
(India) P. V. Sindhu	24	17	18
2	(China) Chen YF	22	21	21

== Men's doubles ==
=== Seeds ===
1. (India) Satwiksairaj Rankireddy / Chirag Shetty (champions)
2. (China) Liang Weikeng / Wang Chang (second round)
3. (South Korea) Kang Min-hyuk / Seo Seung-jae (semi-finals)
4. (Denmark) Kim Astrup / Anders Skaarup Rasmussen (quarter-finals)
5. (Malaysia) Aaron Chia / Soh Wooi Yik (quarter-finals)
6. (Japan) Takuro Hoki / Yugo Kobayashi (semi-finals)
7. (Indonesia) Fajar Alfian / Muhammad Rian Ardianto (quarter-finals)
8. (China) Liu Yuchen / Ou Xuanyi (second round)

=== Finals ===
Semi-finals
1	(India) Satwiksairaj Rankireddy (India) Chirag Shetty	21	21
3	(South Korea) Kang Min-hyuk (South Korea) Seo Seung-jae	13	16
6	(Japan) Takuro Hoki (Japan) Yugo Kobayashi	18	21
(Chinese Taipei) Lee Jhe-huei (Chinese Taipei) Yang Po-hsuan	21	23

Final
1	(India) Satwiksairaj Rankireddy (India) Chirag Shetty	21	21
(Chinese Taipei) Lee Jhe-huei (Chinese Taipei) Yang Po-hsuan	11	17

=== Top half ===
==== Section 1 ====
First round
1	(India) S Rankireddy (India) C Shetty	21	24
(Malaysia) Ong Y S (Malaysia) Teo E Y	13	22
(Canada) K Lee (Canada) T A Lindeman	16	8
(Malaysia) Man W C (Malaysia) Tee K W	21	21
8	(China) Liu YC (China) Ou XY	21	15	21
(Chinese Taipei) Chang K-c (Chinese Taipei) Po L-w	18	21	15
(Thailand) S Jomkoh (Thailand) K Kedren	21	21
PFR	(United States) V Chiu (United States) J Yuan	16	14

Second round
1	(India) S Rankireddy (India) C Shetty	21	21
(Malaysia) Man W C (Malaysia) Tee K W	13	12
8	(China) Liu YC (China) Ou XY	21	10	18
(Thailand) S Jomkoh (Thailand) K Kedren	18	21	21

Quarter-finals
1	(India) S Rankireddy (India) C Shetty	21	21
(Thailand) S Jomkoh (Thailand) K Kedren	19	13

==== Section 2 ====
First round
3	(South Korea) Kang M-h (South Korea) Seo S-j	21	21
PFR	(Germany) B Geiss (Germany) J C Völker	13	14
(France) C Popov (France) T J Popov	11	20
(China) He JT (China) Ren XY	21	22
5	(Malaysia) A Chia (Malaysia) Soh W Y	12
(Germany) M Lamsfuß (Germany) M Seidel	12^{r}
(Malaysia) Goh S F (Malaysia) N Izzuddin	19	17
(Chinese Taipei) Lee F-c (Chinese Taipei) Lee F-j	21	21

Second round
3	(South Korea) Kang M-h (South Korea) Seo S-j	21	21
(China) He JT (China) Ren XY	18	10
5	(Malaysia) A Chia (Malaysia) Soh W Y	21	21
(Chinese Taipei) Lee F-c (Chinese Taipei) Lee F-j	16	18

Quarter-finals
3	(South Korea) Kang M-h (South Korea) Seo S-j	21	21
5	(Malaysia) A Chia (Malaysia) Soh W Y	19	16

=== Bottom half ===
==== Section 3 ====
First round
(Indonesia) L R Carnando (Indonesia) D Marthin	14	15
(Chinese Taipei) Lu C-y (Chinese Taipei) Yang P-ha	21	21
(Scotland) A Dunn (Scotland) A Hall	10	12
6	(Japan) T Hoki (Japan) Y Kobayashi	21	21
(France) L Corvée (France) R Labar	19	21	21
(Indonesia) M Ahsan (Indonesia) H Setiawan	21	17	19
(Denmark) D Lundgaard (Denmark) M Vestergaard	16	13
4	(Denmark) K Astrup (Denmark) A S Rasmussen	21	21

Second round
(Chinese Taipei) Lu C-y (Chinese Taipei) Yang P-ha	21	11	18
6	(Japan) T Hoki (Japan) Y Kobayashi	19	21	21
(France) L Corvée (France) R Labar	9	10
4	(Denmark) K Astrup (Denmark) A S Rasmussen	21	21

Quarter-finals
6	(Japan) T Hoki (Japan) Y Kobayashi	18	21	21
4	(Denmark) K Astrup (Denmark) A S Rasmussen	21	18	15

==== Section 4 ====
First round
(Canada) A Dong (Canada) N Yakura	12	16
(Japan) K Mitsuhashi (Japan) H Okamura	21	21
(England) B Lane (England) S Vendy	16	18
7	(Indonesia) F Alfian (Indonesia) M R Ardianto	21	21
(Indonesia) M S Fikri (Indonesia) B Maulana	11	17
(Chinese Taipei) Lee J-h (Chinese Taipei) Yang P-hs	21	21
(Chinese Taipei) Lee Y (Chinese Taipei) Wang C-l	10	21	11
2	(China) Liang WK (China) Wang C	21	11	21

Second round
(Japan) K Mitsuhashi (Japan) H Okamura	12	18
7	(Indonesia) F Alfian (Indonesia) M R Ardianto	21	21
(Chinese Taipei) Lee J-h (Chinese Taipei) Yang P-hs	21	21	21
2	(China) Liang WK (China) Wang C	17	23	15

Quarter-finals
7	(Indonesia) F Alfian (Indonesia) M R Ardianto	20	19
(Chinese Taipei) Lee J-h (Chinese Taipei) Yang P-hs	22	21

== Women's doubles ==
=== Seeds ===
1. (China) Chen Qingchen / Jia Yifan (champions)
2. (South Korea) Baek Ha-na / Lee So-hee (quarter-finals)
3. (South Korea) Kim So-yeong / Kong Hee-yong (first round)
4. (China) Liu Shengshu / Tan Ning (semi-finals)
5. (China) Zhang Shuxian / Zheng Yu (second round)
6. (Japan) Nami Matsuyama / Chiharu Shida (final)
7. (Japan) Yuki Fukushima / Sayaka Hirota (second round)
8. (Japan) Mayu Matsumoto / Wakana Nagahara (semi-finals)

=== Finals ===
Semi-finals
1	(China) Chen Qingchen (China) Jia Yifan	21	21
8	(Japan) Mayu Matsumoto (Japan) Wakana Nagahara	13	16
4	(China) Liu Shengshu (China) Tan Ning	15	19
6	(Japan) Nami Matsuyama (Japan) Chiharu Shida	21	21

Final
1	(China) Chen Qingchen (China) Jia Yifan	21	19	24
6	(Japan) Nami Matsuyama (Japan) Chiharu Shida	12	21	22

=== Top half ===
==== Section 1 ====
First round
1	(China) Chen QC (China) Jia YF	22	21
(Thailand) J Kititharakul (Thailand) R Prajongjai	20	18
(Japan) R Miyaura (Japan) A Sakuramoto	21	21
(China) Li YJ (China) Luo XM	10	17
7	(Japan) Y Fukushima (Japan) S Hirota	14	22	21
(United States) A Xu (United States) K Xu	21	20	12
(India) T Crasto (India) A Ponnappa	21	19	17
(India) T Jolly (India) G Gopichand	16	21	21

Second round
1	(China) Chen QC (China) Jia YF	21	21
(Japan) R Miyaura (Japan) A Sakuramoto	16	15
7	(Japan) Y Fukushima (Japan) S Hirota	18	13
(India) T Jolly (India) G Gopichand	21	21

Quarter-finals
1	(China) Chen QC (China) Jia YF	21	21
(India) T Jolly (India) G Gopichand	18	7

==== Section 2 ====
First round
3	(South Korea) Kim S-y (South Korea) Kong H-y	21	17	8
(Indonesia) A Rahayu (Indonesia) S F S Ramadhanti	14	21	21
(China) Li WM (China) Liu XX	21	21
(Hong Kong) Yeung N T (Hong Kong) Yeung P L	15	12
8	(Japan) M Matsumoto (Japan) W Nagahara	22	21
(Japan) R Iwanaga (Japan) K Nakanishi	20	11
(Germany) L Efler (Germany) I Lohau	15	13
(Chinese Taipei) Lee C-h (Chinese Taipei) Teng C-h	21	21

Second round
(Indonesia) A Rahayu (Indonesia) S F S Ramadhanti	12	21	14
(China) Li WM (China) Liu XX	21	15	21
8	(Japan) M Matsumoto (Japan) W Nagahara	21	21
(Chinese Taipei) Lee C-h (Chinese Taipei) Teng C-h	14	12

Quarter-finals
(China) Li WM (China) Liu XX	19	11
8	(Japan) M Matsumoto (Japan) W Nagahara	21	21

=== Bottom half ===
==== Section 3 ====
First round
(South Korea) Jeong N-e (South Korea) Kim H-j	21	21
(Chinese Taipei) Hsu Y-c (Chinese Taipei) Lin W-c	13	18
(Malaysia) P Tan (Malaysia) Thinaah M	21	16	12
5	(China) Zhang SX (China) Zheng Y	18	21	21
(Bulgaria) G Stoeva (Bulgaria) S Stoeva	19	21	18
(Thailand) B Aimsaard (Thailand) N Aimsaard	21	14	21
(Netherlands) D Jille (Netherlands) C Seinen	16	6
4	(China) Liu SS (China) Tan N	21	21

Second round
(South Korea) Jeong N-e (South Korea) Kim H-j	21	21
5	(China) Zhang SX (China) Zheng Y	13	11
(Thailand) B Aimsaard (Thailand) N Aimsaard	19	20
4	(China) Liu SS (China) Tan N	21	22

Quarter-finals
(South Korea) Jeong N-e (South Korea) Kim H-j	19	10
4	(China) Liu SS (China) Tan N	21	21

==== Section 4 ====
First round
PFR	(Australia) S Mapasa (Australia) A Yu	21	21
(Malaysia) V Hoo (Malaysia) Lim C S	15	15
(France) M Lambert (France) A Tran	12	15
6	(Japan) N Matsuyama (Japan) C Shida	21	21
(United States) F Corbett (United States) A Lee	21	21
(Canada) C Choi (Canada) J Wu	9	15
(Indonesia) M T Puspita Sari (Indonesia) R A Rose	12	13
2	(South Korea) Baek H-n (South Korea) Lee S-h	21	21

Second round
PFR	(Australia) S Mapasa (Australia) A Yu	11	19
6	(Japan) N Matsuyama (Japan) C Shida	21	21
(United States) F Corbett (United States) A Lee	8	20
2	(South Korea) Baek H-n (South Korea) Lee S-h	21	22

Quarter-finals
6	(Japan) N Matsuyama (Japan) C Shida	21	15	21
2	(South Korea) Baek H-n (South Korea) Lee S-h	14	21	10

== Mixed doubles ==
=== Seeds ===
1. (China) Zheng Siwei / Huang Yaqiong (quarter-finals)
2. (Japan) Yuta Watanabe / Arisa Higashino (quarter-finals)
3. (South Korea) Seo Seung-jae / Chae Yoo-jung (final)
4. (China) Feng Yanzhe / Huang Dongping (champions)
5. (China) Jiang Zhenbang / Wei Yaxin (semi-finals)
6. (Thailand) Dechapol Puavaranukroh / Sapsiree Taerattanachai (semi-finals)
7. (South Korea) Kim Won-ho / Jeong Na-eun (quarter-finals)
8. (Hong Kong) Tang Chun Man / Tse Ying Suet (second round)

=== Finals ===
Semi-finals
6	(Thailand) Dechapol Puavaranukroh (Thailand) Sapsiree Taerattanachai	18	16
3	(South Korea) Seo Seung-jae (South Korea) Chae Yoo-jung	21	21
4	(China) Feng Yanzhe (China) Huang Dongping	21	10	21
5	(China) Jiang Zhenbang (China) Wei Yaxin	19	21	12

Final
3	(South Korea) Seo Seung-jae (South Korea) Chae Yoo-jung	16	16
4	(China) Feng Yanzhe (China) Huang Dongping	21	21

=== Top half ===
==== Section 1 ====
First round
1	(China) Zheng SW (China) Huang YQ	21	21
(Canada) T A Lindeman (Canada) J Wu	7	15
(Thailand) S Jomkoh (Thailand) S Paewsampran	8^{r}
(Chinese Taipei) Yang P-hs (Chinese Taipei) Hu L-f	13
6	(Thailand) D Puavaranukroh (Thailand) S Taerattanachai	21	21
(Denmark) M Christiansen (Denmark) A Bøje	14	14
(Hong Kong) Lee C H (Hong Kong) Ng T Y	21	7	21
(Denmark) M Thyrri (Denmark) A Magelund	19	21	14

Second round
1	(China) Zheng SW (China) Huang YQ	21	21
(Chinese Taipei) Yang P-hs (Chinese Taipei) Hu L-f	15	8
6	(Thailand) D Puavaranukroh (Thailand) S Taerattanachai	14	21	21
(Hong Kong) Lee C H (Hong Kong) Ng T Y	21	12	8

Quarter-finals
1	(China) Zheng SW (China) Huang YQ	21	16	24
6	(Thailand) D Puavaranukroh (Thailand) S Taerattanachai	15	21	26

==== Section 2 ====
First round
3	(South Korea) Seo S-j (South Korea) Chae Y-j	21	21
(England) M Ellis (England) L Smith	17	19
(Indonesia) R Rivaldy (Indonesia) P H Mentari	22	19	20
(Japan) Y Kaneko (Japan) M Matsutomo	20	21	22
8	(Hong Kong) Tang C M (Hong Kong) Tse Y S	21	21
(Japan) K Yamashita (Japan) N Shinoya	19	18
(France) T Gicquel (France) D Delrue	21	21
(Malaysia) Goh S H (Malaysia) S J Lai	19	16

Second round
3	(South Korea) Seo S-j (South Korea) Chae Y-j	21	18	21
(Japan) Y Kaneko (Japan) M Matsutomo	17	21	15
8	(Hong Kong) Tang C M (Hong Kong) Tse Y S	15	19
(France) T Gicquel (France) D Delrue	21	21

Quarter-finals
3	(South Korea) Seo S-j (South Korea) Chae Y-j	21	21
(France) T Gicquel (France) D Delrue	12	9

=== Bottom half ===
==== Section 3 ====
First round
(Singapore) T Hee (Singapore) J Tan	21	23
(Denmark) M Vestergaard (Denmark) C Busch	13	21
(Chinese Taipei) Ye H-w (Chinese Taipei) Lee C-h	21	13	14
7	(South Korea) Kim W-h (South Korea) Jeong N-e	18	21	21
(Malaysia) Tan K M (Malaysia) Lai P J	15	18
(Malaysia) Chen T J (Malaysia) Toh E W	21	21
(United States) V Chiu (United States) J Gai	13	9
4	(China) Feng YZ (China) Huang DP	21	21

Second round
(Singapore) T Hee (Singapore) J Tan	17	19
7	(South Korea) Kim W-h (South Korea) Jeong N-e	21	21
(Malaysia) Chen T J (Malaysia) Toh E W	18	14
4	(China) Feng YZ (China) Huang DP	21	21

Quarter-finals
7	(South Korea) Kim W-h (South Korea) Jeong N-e	10	21	13
4	(China) Feng YZ (China) Huang DP	21	18	21

==== Section 4 ====
First round
(Germany) M Lamsfuß (Germany) I Lohau
(Indonesia) D Ferdinansyah (Indonesia) G E Widjaja	w	/	o
(Thailand) R Oupthong (Thailand) J Sudjaipraparat	16	15
5	(China) Jiang ZB (China) Wei YX	21	21
(Japan) H Midorikawa (Japan) N Saito	21	21
(Netherlands) R Tabeling (Netherlands) S Piek	16	16
(Indonesia) R N Kusharjanto (Indonesia) L A Kusumawati	21	15	14
2	(Japan) Y Watanabe (Japan) A Higashino	14	21	21

Second round
(Indonesia) D Ferdinansyah (Indonesia) G E Widjaja	11	13
5	(China) Jiang ZB (China) Wei YX	21	21
(Japan) H Midorikawa (Japan) N Saito	16	18
2	(Japan) Y Watanabe (Japan) A Higashino	21	21

Quarter-finals
5	(China) Jiang ZB (China) Wei YX	21	21
2	(Japan) Y Watanabe (Japan) A Higashino	9	13

Preceded by 2024 German Open	BWF World Tour; 2024 BWF season	Succeeded by 2024 All England Open; 2024 Orléans Masters
