= Badminton at the 2018 Asian Games – Men's singles =

Men's singles at the 2018 Asian Games
- Venue: Istora Gelora Bung Karno
- Dates: 23–28 August
- Competitors: 33 from 18 nations

Medalists
gold medal	Jonatan Christie	Indonesia
silver medal	Chou Tien-chen	Chinese Taipei
bronze medal	Kenta Nishimoto	Japan
bronze medal	Anthony Sinisuka Ginting	Indonesia

The badminton men's singles tournament at the 2018 Asian Games in Jakarta took place from 23 to 28 August at Istora Gelora Bung Karno.

== Schedule ==
All times are Western Indonesia Time (UTC+07:00)

Date	Time	Event
Thursday, 23 August 2018	13:00	Round of 64
Friday, 24 August 2018	13:30	Round of 32
Saturday, 25 August 2018	13:30	Round of 16
Sunday, 26 August 2018	13:00	Quarterfinals
Monday, 27 August 2018	13:00	Semifinals
Tuesday, 28 August 2018	12:00	Gold medal match

== Seeds ==
The top four Asian pairs were seeded based on the BWF World Rankings.

1. Shi Yuqi (CHN) (second round)
2. Kento Momota (JPN) (third round)
3. Son Wan-ho (KOR) (quarter-finals)
4. Chou Tien-chen (TPE) (semi-finals)
5. Chen Long (CHN) (quarter-finals)
6. Srikanth Kidambi (IND) (second round)
7. Ng Ka Long (HKG) (quarter-finals)
8. Kenta Nishimoto (JPN) (semi-finals)

=== Top half ===
==== Section 1 ====
Round of 64

Round of 32
1	Shi Yuqi (CHN)	19	21	17
Jonatan Christie (INA)	21	19	21
Khosit Phetpradab (THA)	21	21
Niluka Karunaratne (SRI)	12	12
6	Srikanth Kidambi (IND)	21	19
Wong Wing Ki (HKG)	23	21
Wang Tzu-wei (TPE)	24	21
Nguyễn Tiến Minh (VIE)	22	17

Round of 16
Jonatan Christie (INA)	17	21	21
Khosit Phetpradab (THA)	21	18	18
Wong Wing Ki (HKG)	21	16	21
Wang Tzu-wei (TPE)	12	21	13

Quarter-finals
Jonatan Christie (INA)	21	21
Wong Wing Ki (HKG)	11	18

==== Section 2 ====
Round of 64

Round of 32
3	Son Wan-ho (KOR)	21	21
Ratnajit Tamang (NEP)	8	9
Azeem Sarwar (PAK)	13	10
Lee Zii Jia (MAS)	21	21
8	Kenta Nishimoto (JPN)	21	21
Byambajavyn Khuvituguldur (MGL)	11	6
Hussein Zayan Shaheed (MDV)	22	21
Sayed Imran Miri (AFG)	20	11

Round of 16
3	Son Wan-ho (KOR)	21	21
Lee Zii Jia (MAS)	11	17
8	Kenta Nishimoto (JPN)	21	21
Hussein Zayan Shaheed (MDV)	7	10

Quarter-finals
3	Son Wan-ho (KOR)	17	11
8	Kenta Nishimoto (JPN)	21	21

=== Bottom half ===
==== Section 3 ====
Round of 64
Pui Pang Fong (MAC)	21	18	21
Mönkhbatyn Batdavaa (MGL)	15	21	14

Round of 32
Pui Pang Fong (MAC)	14	15
Dinuka Karunaratne (SRI)	21	21
Mohamed Ajfan Rasheed (MDV)	9	10
7	Ng Ka Long (HKG)	21	21
Kantaphon Wangcharoen (THA)	21	15	21
H. S. Prannoy (IND)	12	21	15
Phạm Cao Cường (VIE)	16	12
4	Chou Tien-chen (TPE)	21	21

Round of 16
Dinuka Karunaratne (SRI)	6	14
7	Ng Ka Long (HKG)	21	21
Kantaphon Wangcharoen (THA)	18	21	11
4	Chou Tien-chen (TPE)	21	13	21

Quarter-finals
7	Ng Ka Long (HKG)	18	18
4	Chou Tien-chen (TPE)	21	21

==== Section 4 ====
Round of 64

Round of 32
Heo Kwang-hee (KOR)	21	20	21
Liew Daren (MAS)	8	22	14
Irfan Saeed Bhatti (PAK)	8	10
5	Chen Long (CHN)	21	21
Anthony Sinisuka Ginting (INA)	21	21
Mehran Shahbazi (IRI)	9	8
Bikash Shrestha (NEP)	9	10
2	Kento Momota (JPN)	21	21

Round of 16
Heo Kwang-hee (KOR)	22	18
5	Chen Long (CHN)	24	21
Anthony Sinisuka Ginting (INA)	21	21
2	Kento Momota (JPN)	18	18

Quarter-finals
5	Chen Long (CHN)	19	11
Anthony Sinisuka Ginting (INA)	21	21

== Results ==
=== Finals ===
Semifinals
Jonatan Christie (INA)	21	15	21
8	Kenta Nishimoto (JPN)	15	21	19
4	Chou Tien-chen (TPE)	16	23	21
Anthony Sinisuka Ginting (INA)	21	21	17

Gold Medal Match
Jonatan Christie (INA)	21	20	21
4	Chou Tien-chen (TPE)	18	22	15
