= Jonatan Christie =

Indonesian badminton player (born 1997)

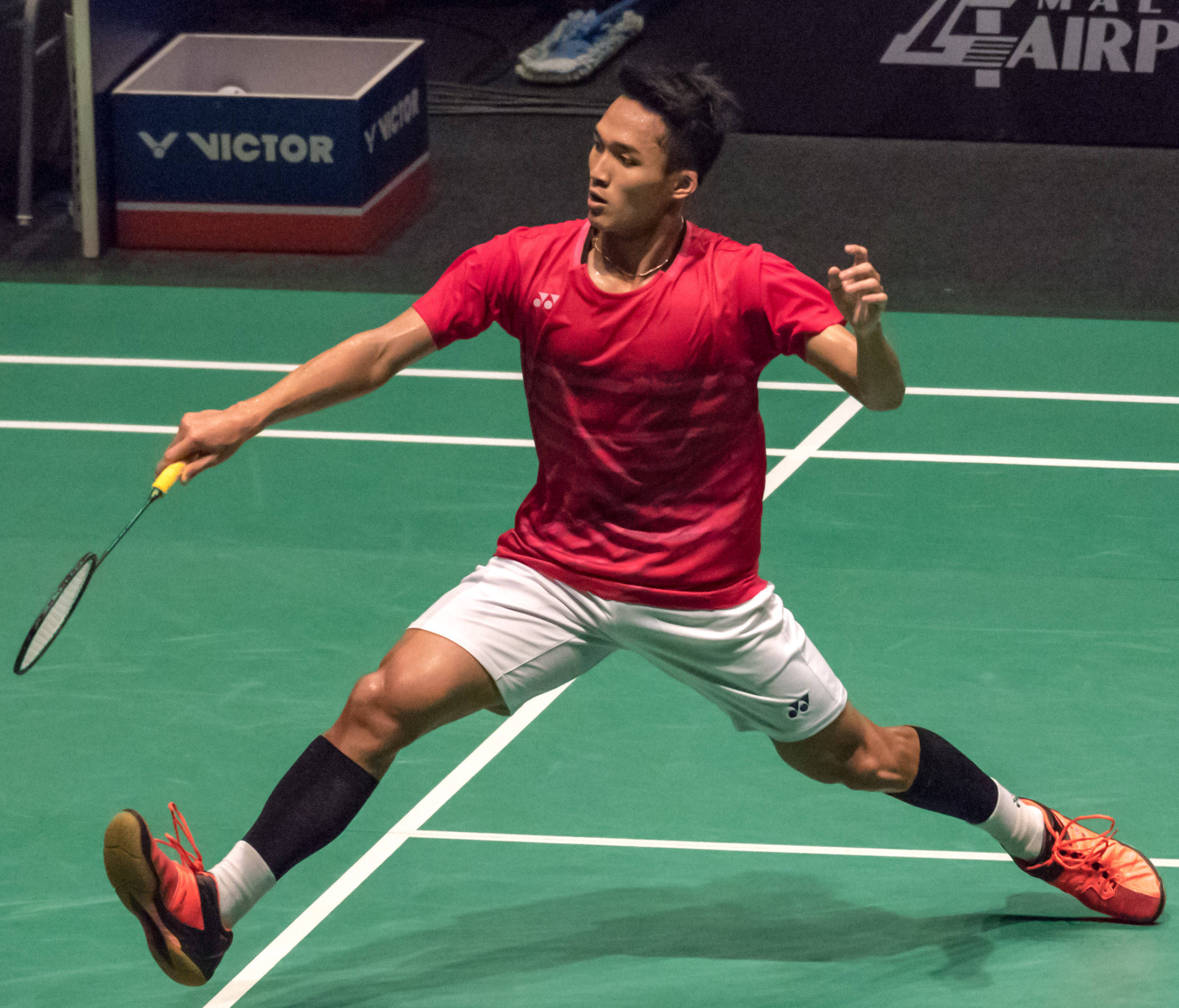
- Christie in 2017

Personal information
- Nickname: Jojo
- Born: Leonardus Jonatan Christie; 15 September 1997 (age 29) Jakarta, Indonesia
- Height: 1.79 m (5 ft 10 in)
- Weight: 80 kg (176 lb)
- Spouse: Shania Junianatha (m. 2023)

Sport
- Country: Indonesia
- Sport: Badminton
- Handedness: Right
- Coached by: Indra Wijaya; Marleve Mainaky

Men's singles
- Career record: 359 wins, 161 losses
- Highest ranking: 1 (25 August 2026)
- Current ranking: 8 (17 November 2026)
- BWF profile
Medal record
Men's badminton
Representing Indonesia
Sudirman Cup
| Bronze medal – third place | 2015 Dongguan | Mixed team |
| Bronze medal – third place | 2019 Nanning | Mixed team |
| Bronze medal – third place | 2025 Xiamen | Mixed team |
Thomas Cup
| Gold medal – first place | 2020 Aarhus | Men's team |
| Silver medal – second place | 2016 Kunshan | Men's team |
| Silver medal – second place | 2022 Bangkok | Men's team |
| Silver medal – second place | 2024 Chengdu | Men's team |
| Bronze medal – third place | 2018 Bangkok | Men's team |
Asian Games
| Gold medal – first place | 2018 Jakarta–Palembang | Men's singles |
| Gold medal – first place | 2026 Aichi–Nagoya | Men's team |
| Silver medal – second place | 2018 Jakarta–Palembang | Men's team |
Asian Championships
| Gold medal – first place | 2024 Ningbo | Men's singles |
| Silver medal – second place | 2022 Manila | Men's singles |
Asia Team Championships
| Gold medal – first place | 2016 Hyderabad | Men's team |
| Gold medal – first place | 2018 Alor Setar | Men's team |
| Gold medal – first place | 2020 Manila | Men's team |
SEA Games
| Gold medal – first place | 2015 Singapore | Men's team |
| Gold medal – first place | 2017 Kuala Lumpur | Men's team |
| Gold medal – first place | 2017 Kuala Lumpur | Men's singles |
| Gold medal – first place | 2019 Philippines | Men's team |
World Junior Championships
| Silver medal – second place | 2013 Bangkok | Mixed team |
| Silver medal – second place | 2014 Alor Setar | Mixed team |

Leonardus Jonatan Christie (born 15 September 1997) is an Indonesian badminton player specializing in the singles discipline affiliated with the Tangkas Specs club. He won the 2024 edition of the All England Open. He won the men's singles title at the 2017 SEA Games and at the 2018 Asian Games. Christie was part of Indonesia's winning team at the 2020 Thomas Cup and 2026 Asian Games.

== Career ==
Christie was called up to join the Indonesian national team in 2012, after he reached the semi-finals of the 2012 National Championships in Solo, Central Java.

In July 2013, Christie won his first international senior title at 15 years old at the Indonesia International Challenge, after beating the experienced Alamsyah Yunus who is 11 years older than him in the final by 21–17, 21–10.

Christie started the 2014 season as the world number 1 in BWF boys' singles ranking. Although still competing in the junior tournament, Christie again has reached the finals of the senior event in the 2014 Indonesia International Challenge, but he has not managed to defend his title after being defeated by the Korean veteran Lee Hyun-il by 5 sets, 10–11, 11–9, 11–5, 8–11, 3–11. In October, he won the Swiss International.

In 2017, Christie reached the finals of the Thailand Open Grand Prix, and later the Korea Open Super Series event. He was defeated by B. Sai Praneeth in Thailand and Anthony Sinisuka Ginting in Korea. In August, he won gold medals at the SEA Games in the men's singles and team event.

=== 2018-2019: Asian Games surprise, rise into the top 10 ===
In 2018, Christie and the Indonesian men's team managed to defend the Asia Team Championships title after beating China 3–1 in the final. In May, he advanced to the finals of the New Zealand Open, but was beaten by two-time Olympic champion Lin Dan in straight games. At the 2018 Asian Games in Jakarta, he won 21–18, 20–22, 21–15 over Chou Tien-chen and took the badminton men's singles gold medal for Indonesia. In the team event, he helped the Indonesian team earn silver medal.

Christie opened the 2019 season as number 11 in the BWF World ranking. He played at the Malaysia Masters, but had to defeat in the second round to reigning Olympic champion Chen Long, the head-to-head record between the players stood at 0–6. He then lost in the semi-finals of the Indonesia Masters to Anders Antonsen in straight games. In March Europe tour, he fell in the early stages of the All England and Swiss Opens. In April, he advanced to the semi-finals of the Malaysia Open beating World number 1 Kento Momota in the second round, and Viktor Axelsen in the quarter-finals, both in straight games. His pace then was stopped by Chen Long in rubber games. This result allowed him to beat four out of the world's top five men's singles players (Kento Momota, Shi Yuqi, Chou Tien-chen and Viktor Axelsen) in the BWF World rankings. A week later in the quarter-finals of the Singapore Open, Axelsen avenged his previous defeat in a close rubber games, with a score of 24–22, 18–21, and 22–24.

In May 2019, Christie claimed two titles in the Oceania tour, by winning the New Zealand and Australian Opens. Christie then reached the finals of the Super 750 event, the Japan and French Opens. The other results of Christie in 2019 was the semi-finalists in the Hong Kong Open; the quarter-finalists in the Korea, Indonesia, Fuzhou China Opens and the World Championships. His unsatisfactory results came from the China Open and the Asian Championships, where he was defeated in the first round. He then qualified to World Tour Finals, where his journey ended in the group stage. He reached a career high of number four in the BWF World ranking on 6 August 2019.

=== 2021: Olympic debut, Sudirman Cup slump, Thomas Cup redemption ===
Christie competed at the 2020 Summer Olympics in Tokyo, Japan. He topped the group G standings after beating Aram Mahmoud and Loh Kean Yew. He lost to Shi Yuqi of China in straight games and was knocked out at the Round of 16.

In September–October 2021, Christie alongside the Indonesian team competed at the 2021 Sudirman Cup in Vantaa, Finland. He played a match in the group stage against Brian Yang of Canada, but was defeated in the rubber games. Indonesia advanced to the knockout stage but lost at the quarterfinals against Malaysia. He made up for his less than favorable performance in the previous tournaments at the 2020 Thomas Cup, notably sealing Indonesia's victory against Denmark at the semifinals in a 100-minute match against Anders Antonsen and against China in the finals against Li Shifeng. He continued his form at the Denmark Open, but was forced to retire from his quarterfinal match against Kento Momota due to a waist injury, which forced him to withdraw from the French Open.

During the three tournaments in Bali, Christie was defeated by Srikanth Kidambi at the second round of Indonesia Masters, but bounced back by reaching the semifinals of Indonesia Open. Christie did not qualify for the 2021 BWF World Tour Finals.

=== 2022: Breaking the title drought, World Tour Finals ===
Christie started his 2022 season with a second-round exit at German Open. After the tournament, Christie tested positive for COVID-19. Luckily, he tested negative after performing two tests, and was able depart to Birmingham for the All England Open. He lost to Chou Tien-chen in the quarterfinals of All England. Christie later won the Swiss Open, his first BWF World Tour title since 2019. In April, he reached the finals of the Korea Open, but lost to Weng Hongyang of China. He then finished as runner-up of the Badminton Asia Championships against Lee Zii Jia. However, he bowed out of the 2022 BWF World Championships at the quarterfinals after squandering six match points against Chou Tien-chen.

Despite a few more early exits, Christie managed to qualify for the 2022 BWF World Tour Finals and reached the semifinals, where he was defeated by teammate and eventual runner-up Anthony Sinisuka Ginting.

=== 2023: First Super 500 and Super 750 titles ===
Christie started the year as the world number 3. At the season opener Malaysia Open, he was defeated in the second round by Kenta Nishimoto. In the following week, he reached the semi-finals of India Open, but was eliminated by top seed Viktor Axelsen. Christie then won the Indonesia Masters after beating his teammate Chico Aura Dwi Wardoyo, thus securing his first ever Super 500 title and creating the tournament's first all-Indonesian men's singles final since 2013. He then reached a career high as world number 2 in the BWF rankings on 31 January 2024.

Despite the promising start, Christie's performance throughout the year was marked with many early exits. At the All England Open, he lost to Weng Hongyang in the first round; then exited the Malaysia Masters at the second round against Kenta Nishimoto; and at the Singapore Open, he lost to Shi Yuqi at the first round. He reached the quarter-finals in the Indonesia Open, before losing to compatriot and eventual runner-up Anthony Sinisuka Ginting.

Christie was called up to the Indonesian team for the 2023 Sudirman Cup in Suzhou, China. He played two matches in the group stage: won against Fabian Roth of Germany, but was defeated by Kunlavut Vitidsarn in three games. Indonesia advanced to the knockout stage but lost at the quarterfinals to China.

In the second half of 2023, Christie reached his second final at the Japan Open. He finished as runner-up after losing against the world number 1 Viktor Axelsen in straight games. At the Australian Open, he lost to Ng Tze Yong at the second round, and fell at the first round of the World Championships to Lee Zii Jia. He reached the semi-finals in the China Open, again falling to Axelsen. Christie then claimed his second title in 2023 at the Hong Kong Open and became the first Indonesian to win the tournament's men's singles title in 25 years. In his third appearance at the Asian Games, he was unable to defend his title after a first round loss to Chou Tien-chen, preceded by an upset against South Korea's Lee Yun-gyu as the second singles at the men's event.

Christie's bad spell continued at the Denmark Open with another first round loss against Chou Tien-chen. Unexpectedly, he rebounded at the French Open, where he won his first ever Super 750 title over Li Shifeng. He advanced to the quarterfinals of Kumamoto Masters, but was still unable to overcome Viktor Axelsen, thus ending his winning streak in matches going into three games in 2023. Christie later withdrew from the China Masters due to a foot injury.

=== 2024: First Super 1000 title ===
Christie's 2024 campaign started with consecutive early exits, including at the Indonesia Masters and the French Open where he was defending champion. However, he managed to improve his results at the All England Open, where he overcame Lakshya Sen in the semi-finals to create the first all-Indonesian men's singles final in the tournament since Hariyanto Arbi and Ardy Wiranata in 1994. He overcame compatriot Anthony Sinisuka Ginting to win his first Super 1000 title and become Indonesia's first All England men's singles champion in 30 years. In the next tournament, he won the Asian Championships defeated home favourite Li Shifeng in the final.

Christie was the 2nd men's singles pick at the Thomas Cup and achieved an impressive 100% winning record against all of his opponents during the event. Eventually he led Indonesia to achieve the runner-up at the Thomas Cup 2024 edition. Christie would then bow out of the Singapore and Indonesia Opens, suffering first round exits to Chou Tien-chen and Leong Jun Hao respectively. He then made his second appearance at the Olympic Games, but was eliminated in the group stage. In the next tournament, he finished as semi-finalists in the Hong Kong and China Opens. Christie qualified for the 2024 BWF World Tour Finals and finished the year-end tournament as a semifinalist after losing against Anders Antonsen in the semifinals.

=== 2025-2026: New phase as an independent player, world #1 ===
Christie had a rocky start to the year, with his best result in the Southeast Asian season openers being a runner-up finish at home tournament 2025 Indonesia Masters. He also did not manage to defend his All England Open title after being eliminated at the second round by Lakshya Sen. He finished the 2025 Badminton Asia Championships at the quarterfinals, where he was stopped by Lu Guangzu. En route to the 2025 Sudirman Cup, Christie was appointed as captain of the Indonesian squad. Despite the absence of several senior players, Indonesia managed to reach the semifinals for the first time since 2019, with Christie winning both his matches against India's H.S. Prannoy at the group stage and Thailand's Kunlavut Vitidsarn at the quarterfinals. He also appeared during junior Alwi Farhan's matches as assistant to men's singles head coach Indra Wijaya.

On May 15, Christie announced his departure from the Indonesian national team, citing the need for a more flexible training arrangement to accommodate his new responsibilities as a parent. In his first tournament as an independent player, the Singapore Open, he lost in the second round to Leong Jun Hao. After a title drought since the 2024 All England Open, Christie finally managed to top the podium at the Korea Open in late September. Christie continued his good form by winning the Denmark Open against the reigning world champion, Shi Yuqi in three sets. Christie finished the October tournaments strongly by winning Hylo Open over Magnus Johannesen.

In December, Christie officially received a sponsorship from the Indonesian restaurant chain Waroeng Steak and Shake, which has also sponsored fellow independent players Hendra Setiawan, Sabar Karyaman Gutama and Muhammad Reza Pahlevi Isfahani, and Christian Adinata. He embarked to the World Tour Finals in Hangzhou to compete in group A. However, Christie lost all of his matches against Kunlavut Vitidsarn, Anders Antonsen, and Christo Popov, and thus ended up at the last place.

In his sixth appearance at the World Championships in 2026, he was stopped in the third round by Rasmus Gemke. Despite a disappointing result at the World Championships in New Delhi, Christie reached world No. 1 in the BWF men's singles rankings for the first time when the rankings were released on 25 August 2026. In his fourth participation at the Asian Games, Christie won a gold medal in the men's team event.

== Personal life ==
Christie is a devout Roman Catholic. In December 2021, he was officially engaged to former member of JKT48 idol group Shania Junianatha after previously going public about their romantic relationship in 2020. On 1 December 2023, Christie married Junianatha at the Jakarta Cathedral, officiated by Archbishop of Jakarta, Ignatius Suharyo Hardjoatmodjo. On 27 August 2024, right after the 2024 Summer Olympics, Junianatha gave birth to the couple's first son Jayden.

Christie is active in philanthropy efforts. He donated 1.5 billion Rupiah from winning the 2018 Asian Games to build a mosque and a school in Lombok after an earthquake in the same year. He has also raised funds for various causes, such as for clean water in East Nusa Tenggara, Indonesian citizens affected by the COVID-19 pandemic, victims of the Semeru eruption, and education for children at the Bantar Gebang waste area. In January 2023, he initiated a scholarship named Beasiswa Jalincita to fund the education and capacity building of selected recipients.

== Filmography ==
In 2009, he made a supporting cast appearance in badminton-themed film King. The film, directed by Ari Sihasale and dedicated to the legendary Liem Swie King, also featured cameos by many notable badminton players such as King himself, Hariyanto Arbi, Hastomo Arbi, Ellen Angelina, Ivana Lie, Rosiana Tendean, Maria Kristin Yulianti, Fransisca Ratnasari, and in their youth, Kevin Sanjaya Sukamuljo, Rafiddias Akhdan Nugroho, Cisita Joity Jansen, Uswatun Khasanah, and Intan Dwi Jayanti.

== Awards and nominations ==
| Award | Year | Category | Result | Ref. |
|---|---|---|---|---|
| Indonesian Sport Awards | 2018 | Favorite Male Athlete | Nominated | |
| Golden Award SIWO PWI | 2019 | Favorite Male Athlete | Nominated | |
| Golden Award SIWO PWI | 2019 | Favorite Team with 2018 Asian Games men's badminton team | Nominated | |
| Gatra Awards | 2021 | Sports Category with 2020 Thomas Cup squad | Won | |
| RCTI Indonesian Sports Entertainment Awards | 2024 | Best Male Athlete | Won | |
| RCTI Indonesian Sports Entertainment Awards | 2024 | Most Popular Male Athlete | Nominated | |

== Achievements ==
=== Asian Games ===
Men's singles
| Year | Venue | Opponent | Score | Result | Ref. |
|---|---|---|---|---|---|
| 2018 | Istora Gelora Bung Karno, Jakarta, Indonesia | (Chinese Taipei) Chou Tien-chen | 21–18, 20–22, 21–15 | Gold | |

=== Asian Championships ===
Men's singles
| Year | Venue | Opponent | Score | Result | Ref. |
|---|---|---|---|---|---|
| 2022 | Muntinlupa Sports Complex, Metro Manila, Philippines | (Malaysia) Lee Zii Jia | 17–21, 21–23 | Silver | |
| 2024 | Ningbo Olympic Sports Center Gymnasium, Ningbo, China | (China) Li Shifeng | 21–15, 21–16 | Gold | |

=== SEA Games ===
Men's singles
| Year | Venue | Opponent | Score | Result | Ref. |
|---|---|---|---|---|---|
| 2017 | Axiata Arena, Kuala Lumpur, Malaysia | (Thailand) Khosit Phetpradab | 21–19, 21–10 | Gold | |

=== BWF World Tour (10 titles, 11 runners-up) ===
The BWF World Tour, which was announced on 19 March 2017 and implemented in 2018, is a series of elite badminton tournaments sanctioned by the Badminton World Federation (BWF). The BWF World Tour is divided into levels of World Tour Finals, Super 1000, Super 750, Super 500, Super 300, and the BWF Tour Super 100.

Men's singles
| Year | Tournament | Level | Opponent | Score | Result | Ref. |
|---|---|---|---|---|---|---|
| 2018 | New Zealand Open | Super 300 | (China) Lin Dan | 14–21, 19–21 | (silver) Runner-up | |
| 2019 | New Zealand Open | Super 300 | (Hong Kong) Ng Ka Long | 21–12, 21–13 | (gold) Winner | |
| 2019 | Australian Open | Super 300 | (Indonesia) Anthony Sinisuka Ginting | 21–17, 13–21, 21–14 | (gold) Winner | |
| 2019 | Japan Open | Super 750 | (Japan) Kento Momota | 16–21, 13–21 | (silver) Runner-up | |
| 2019 | French Open | Super 750 | (China) Chen Long | 19–21, 12–21 | (silver) Runner-up | |
| 2022 | Swiss Open | Super 300 | (India) Prannoy H. S. | 21–12, 21–18 | (gold) Winner | |
| 2022 | Korea Open | Super 500 | (China) Weng Hongyang | 21–12, 19–21, 15–21 | (silver) Runner-up | |
| 2023 | Indonesia Masters | Super 500 | (Indonesia) Chico Aura Dwi Wardoyo | 21–15, 21–13 | (gold) Winner | |
| 2023 | Japan Open | Super 750 | (Denmark) Viktor Axelsen | 7–21, 18–21 | (silver) Runner-up | |
| 2023 | Hong Kong Open | Super 500 | (Japan) Kenta Nishimoto | 12–21, 22–20, 21–18 | (gold) Winner | |
| 2023 | French Open | Super 750 | (China) Li Shifeng | 16–21, 21–15, 21–14 | (gold) Winner | |
| 2024 | All England Open | Super 1000 | (Indonesia) Anthony Sinisuka Ginting | 21–15, 21–14 | (gold) Winner | |
| 2024 | Arctic Open | Super 500 | (Chinese Taipei) Chou Tien-chen | 18–21, 17–21 | (silver) Runner-up | |
| 2024 | China Masters | Super 750 | (Denmark) Anders Antonsen | 15–21, 13–21 | (silver) Runner-up | |
| 2025 | Indonesia Masters | Super 500 | (Thailand) Kunlavut Vitidsarn | 21–18, 17–21, 18–21 | (silver) Runner-up | |
| 2025 | Korea Open | Super 500 | (Denmark) Anders Antonsen | 21–10, 15–21, 21–17 | (gold) Winner | |
| 2025 | Denmark Open | Super 750 | (China) Shi Yuqi | 13–21, 21–15, 21–15 | (gold) Winner | |
| 2025 | Hylo Open | Super 500 | (Denmark) Magnus Johannesen | 21–14, 21–14 | (gold) Winner | |
| 2026 | India Open | Super 750 | (Chinese Taipei) Lin Chun-yi | 10–21, 18–21 | (silver) Runner-up | |
| 2026 | Indonesia Open | Super 1000 | (Canada) Victor Lai | 19–21, 8–21 | (silver) Runner-up | |
| 2026 | Hylo Open | Super 500 | (India) Lakshya Sen | 17–21, 10–21 | (silver) Runner-up | |

=== BWF Superseries (1 runner-up) ===
The BWF Superseries, which was launched on 14 December 2006 and implemented in 2007, was a series of elite badminton tournaments, sanctioned by the Badminton World Federation (BWF). BWF Superseries levels were Superseries and Superseries Premier. A season of Superseries consisted of twelve tournaments around the world that had been introduced since 2011. Successful players were invited to the Superseries Finals, which were held at the end of each year.

Men's singles
| Year | Tournament | Opponent | Score | Result | Ref. |
|---|---|---|---|---|---|
| 2017 | Korea Open | (Indonesia) Anthony Sinisuka Ginting | 13–21, 21–19, 20–22 | (silver) Runner-up | |

BWF Super Series Finals tournament
BWF Super Series Premier tournament
BWF Super Series tournament

=== BWF Grand Prix (1 runner-up) ===
The BWF Grand Prix had two levels, the Grand Prix and Grand Prix Gold. It was a series of badminton tournaments sanctioned by the Badminton World Federation (BWF) and played between 2007 and 2017.

Men's singles
| Year | Tournament | Opponent | Score | Result | Ref. |
|---|---|---|---|---|---|
| 2017 | Thailand Open | (India) B. Sai Praneeth | 21–17, 18–21, 19–21 | (silver) Runner-up | |

BWF Grand Prix Gold tournament
BWF Grand Prix tournament

=== BWF International Challenge/Series (2 titles, 1 runner-up) ===
Men's singles
| Year | Tournament | Opponent | Score | Result | Ref. |
|---|---|---|---|---|---|
| 2013 | Indonesia International | (Indonesia) Alamsyah Yunus | 21–17, 21–10 | (gold) Winner | |
| 2014 | Indonesia International | (South Korea) Lee Hyun-il | 10–11, 11–9, 11–5, 8–11, 3–11 | (silver) Runner-up | |
| 2014 | Swiss International | (Hong Kong) Ng Ka Long | 9–11, 9–11, 11–6, 11–9, 11–10 | (gold) Winner | |

BWF International Challenge tournament
BWF International Series tournament

== Performance timeline ==
Key

| W | Won | F | Finalist | SF | Semi-finalist |
| QF | Quarter-finalist | #R | Rounds 4, 3, 2, 1 | RR | Round-robin stage |
| Q# | Qualification round | A | Absent | w/d | Withdrew |
| G | Gold | S | Silver | B | Bronze |
| NH | Not held | N/A | Not applicable | DNQ | Did not qualify |

=== National team ===
- Junior level

| Team events | 2013 | 2014 |
|---|---|---|
| Asian Junior Championships | A | QF |
| World Junior Championships | S | S |

- Senior level

| Team events | 2014 | 2015 | 2016 | 2017 | 2018 | 2019 | 2020 | 2021 | 2022 | 2023 | 2024 | 2025 | 2026 | Ref |
|---|---|---|---|---|---|---|---|---|---|---|---|---|---|---|
| SEA Games | NH | G | NH | G | NH | G | NH | A | NH | A | NH | A | NH | |
| Asia Team Championships | NH | | G | NH | G | NH | G | NH | A | NH | A | NH | A | |
| Asian Games | QF | NH | | | S | NH | | | QF | NH | | | G | |
| Thomas Cup | A | NH | S | NH | B | NH | G | NH | S | NH | S | NH | GS | |
| Sudirman Cup | NH | B | NH | RR | NH | B | NH | QF | NH | QF | NH | B | NH | |

=== Individual competitions ===
- Junior level

| Events | 2013 | 2014 |
|---|---|---|
| Asian Junior Championships | A | QF |
| World Junior Championships | QF | QF |

- Senior level

| Events | 2014 | 2015 | 2016 | 2017 | 2018 | 2019 | 2020 | 2021 | 2022 | 2023 | 2024 | 2025 | 2026 | Ref |
|---|---|---|---|---|---|---|---|---|---|---|---|---|---|---|
| SEA Games | NH | QF | NH | G | NH | A | NH | A | NH | A | NH | A | NH | |
| Asian Championships | A | | 2R | A | 2R | 1R | NH | | S | 1R | G | QF | QF | |
| Asian Games | A | NH | | | G | NH | | | 2R | NH | | | QF | |
| World Championships | DNQ | | NH | DNQ | 1R | QF | NH | w/d | QF | 1R | NH | QF | 3R | |
| Olympic Games | NH | | DNQ | NH | | | 2R | NH | | | RR | NH | | |

| Tournament | BWF Superseries / Grand Prix | | | | | BWF World Tour | | | | | | | | | Best | Ref |
| Tournament | 2013 | 2014 | 2015 | 2016 | 2017 | 2018 | 2019 | 2020 | 2021 | 2022 | 2023 | 2024 | 2025 | 2026 | Best | Ref |
|---|---|---|---|---|---|---|---|---|---|---|---|---|---|---|---|---|
| Malaysia Open | A | | | SF | QF | 2R | SF | NH | | SF | 2R | 1R | 1R | SF | SF ('16, '19, '22, '26) | |
| India Open | A | | | | | | | NH | | A | SF | 2R | SF | F | F ('26) | |
| Indonesia Masters | QF | 1R | QF | 2R | NH | 1R | SF | QF | 2R | 1R | W | 1R | F | w/d | W ('23) | |
| Thailand Masters | NH | | | A | 2R | A | | | NH | | A | | | | 2R ('17) | |
| German Open | A | | | | | QF | A | NH | | 2R | A | | | | QF ('18) | |
| All England Open | A | | | 1R | A | 2R | 2R | 1R | 2R | QF | 1R | W | 2R | 2R | W ('24) | |
| Swiss Open | A | | QF | A | | | 2R | NH | A | W | A | | | | W ('22) | |
| Thailand Open | A | NH | 3R | A | F | A | | QF | NH | w/d | A | | | | F ('17) | |
| Thailand Open | A | NH | 3R | A | F | A | | 1R | NH | w/d | A | | | | F ('17) | |
| Malaysia Masters | A | | 2R | 2R | QF | QF | 2R | QF | NH | 1R | 2R | A | | QF | QF ('17, '18, '20, '26) | |
| Singapore Open | A | | | 2R | QF | A | QF | NH | | 2R | 1R | 1R | 2R | 1R | QF ('17, '19) | |
| Indonesia Open | A | | QF | QF | 2R | 1R | QF | NH | SF | 2R | QF | 1R | 2R | F | F ('26) | |
| Australian Open | A | | | 1R | 2R | A | W | NH | | w/d | 2R | w/d | 1R | A | W ('19) | |
| Macau Open | A | | 3R | A | | | | NH | | | | A | | | 3R ('15) | |
| Japan Open | A | | Q2 | A | 1R | 1R | F | NH | | 2R | F | w/d | 1R | 1R | F ('19, '23) | |
| China Open | A | | | | 2R | 2R | 1R | NH | | | SF | SF | 2R | QF | SF ('23, '24) | |
| Chinese Taipei Open | A | 1R | 1R | A | | | | NH | | A | | | | | 1R ('14, '15) | |
| Korea Masters | A | | QF | A | | | | NH | | A | | | | | QF ('15) | |
| China Masters | A | | | | | 2R | QF | NH | | | w/d | F | 2R | 2R | F ('24) | |
| Vietnam Open | 3R | A | 2R | A | | | | NH | | A | | | | | 3R ('13) | |
| Arctic Open | N/A | | | | | | | NH | | | A | F | A | | F ('24) | |
| Denmark Open | A | | | | 2R | 2R | 2R | A | QF | QF | 1R | 2R | W | 2R | W ('25) | |
| French Open | A | | | QF | 1R | QF | F | NH | w/d | QF | W | 1R | 2R | 1R | W ('23) | |
| Hylo Open | A | | | QF | A | | | | | QF | A | | W | F | W ('25) | |
| Korea Open | A | | 2R | A | F | SF | QF | NH | | F | A | | W | A | W ('25) | |
| Japan Masters | NH | | | | | | | | | | QF | SF | A | | SF ('24) | |
| Hong Kong Open | A | | Q2 | A | 1R | QF | SF | NH | | | W | SF | A | | W ('23) | |
| Syed Modi International | NH | A | | 3R | A | | | NH | | A | | | | | 3R ('16) | |
| Superseries / World Tour Finals | DNQ | | | | | | RR | DNQ | | SF | SF | SF | RR | DNQ | SF ('22, '23, '24) | |
| Chinese Taipei Masters | NH | | 3R | A | NH | | | | | | | | | | 3R ('15) | |
| Dutch Open | A | QF | A | | | | | NH | N/A | | | | | | QF ('14) | |
| New Zealand Open | A | | | 3R | 2R | F | W | NH | | | | | | | W ('19) | |
| Year-end ranking | 147 | 94 | 38 | 22 | 14 | 11 | 6 | 7 | 8 | 4 | 5 | 3 | 4 | | 1 | |
| Tournament | 2013 | 2014 | 2015 | 2016 | 2017 | 2018 | 2019 | 2020 | 2021 | 2022 | 2023 | 2024 | 2025 | 2026 | Best | Ref |

== Record against selected opponents ==
Record against year-end Finals finalists, World Championships semi-finalists, and Olympic quarter-finalists. Accurate as of 23 December 2025.

| Player | Matches | Win | Lost | Diff. |
|---|---|---|---|---|
| (China) Chen Long | 8 | 0 | 8 | –8 |
| (China) Lin Dan | 7 | 3 | 4 | –1 |
| (China) Shi Yuqi | 19 | 10 | 9 | +1 |
| (China) Zhao Junpeng | 6 | 3 | 3 | 0 |
| (Chinese Taipei) Chou Tien-chen | 17 | 9 | 8 | +1 |
| (Denmark) Anders Antonsen | 13 | 7 | 6 | +1 |
| (Denmark) Viktor Axelsen | 13 | 2 | 11 | –9 |
| (Denmark) Jan Ø. Jørgensen | 7 | 5 | 2 | +3 |
| (Denmark) Hans-Kristian Vittinghus | 4 | 4 | 0 | +4 |
| (England) Rajiv Ouseph | 5 | 3 | 2 | +1 |
| (France) Christo Popov | 2 | 0 | 2 | –2 |
| (India) Parupalli Kashyap | 2 | 1 | 1 | 0 |
| (India) Srikanth Kidambi | 12 | 5 | 7 | –2 |
| (India) B. Sai Praneeth | 5 | 3 | 2 | +1 |
| (India) Prannoy H. S. | 10 | 7 | 3 | +4 |
| (India) Lakshya Sen | 7 | 4 | 4 | 0 |

| Player | Matches | Win | Lost | Diff. |
|---|---|---|---|---|
| (Indonesia) Anthony Sinisuka Ginting | 10 | 4 | 6 | –2 |
| (Indonesia) Tommy Sugiarto | 3 | 1 | 2 | –1 |
| (Japan) Kento Momota | 7 | 2 | 5 | –3 |
| (Japan) Kodai Naraoka | 7 | 5 | 2 | +3 |
| (Japan) Sho Sasaki | 1 | 0 | 1 | –1 |
| (Malaysia) Lee Zii Jia | 11 | 6 | 5 | +1 |
| (Malaysia) Liew Daren | 5 | 4 | 1 | +3 |
| (Singapore) Loh Kean Yew | 8 | 8 | 0 | +8 |
| (South Korea) Heo Kwang-hee | 4 | 1 | 3 | –2 |
| (South Korea) Lee Hyun-il | 3 | 2 | 1 | +1 |
| (South Korea) Son Wan-ho | 6 | 2 | 4 | –2 |
| (Thailand) Boonsak Ponsana | 1 | 1 | 0 | +1 |
| (Thailand) Kunlavut Vitidsarn | 14 | 8 | 6 | +2 |
| (Thailand) Kantaphon Wangcharoen | 3 | 3 | 0 | +3 |
| (Vietnam) Nguyễn Tiến Minh | 1 | 0 | 1 | –1 |
