= Kenta Nishimoto =

Japanese badminton player (born 1994)

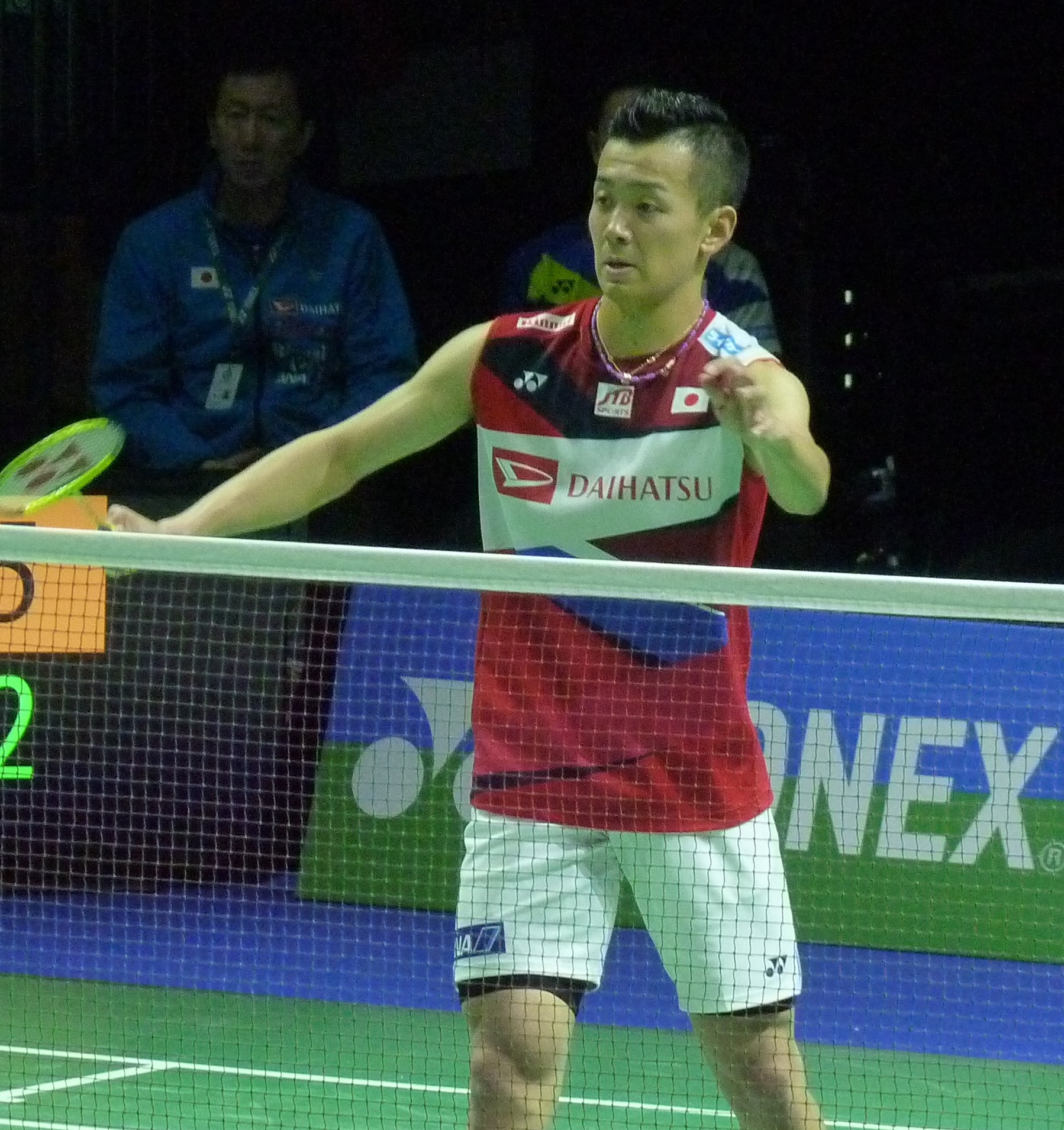
- Nishimoto at the 2019 German Open

Personal information
- Born: 30 August 1994 (age 32) Ise, Mie, Japan
- Height: 180 cm (5 ft 11 in)
- Weight: 75 kg (165 lb)

Sport
- Country: Japan
- Sport: Badminton
- Handedness: Right
- Coached by: Sho Sasaki

Men's singles
- Highest ranking: 9 (6 September 2018)
- Current ranking: 33 (17 November 2026)
- BWF profile
Medal record
Men's badminton
Representing Japan
Sudirman Cup
Silver medal – second place	2019 Nanning	Mixed team
Silver medal – second place	2021 Vantaa	Mixed team
Bronze medal – third place	2017 Gold Coast	Mixed team
Bronze medal – third place	2023 Suzhou	Mixed team
Thomas Cup
Silver medal – second place	2018 Bangkok	Men's team
Bronze medal – third place	2020 Aarhus	Men's team
Bronze medal – third place	2022 Bangkok	Men's team
Asian Games
Bronze medal – third place	2018 Jakarta–Palembang	Men's singles
Bronze medal – third place	2018 Jakarta–Palembang	Men's team
Bronze medal – third place	2022 Hangzhou	Men's team
Asia Mixed Team Championships
Gold medal – first place	2017 Ho Chi Minh	Mixed team
Bronze medal – third place	2025 Qingdao	Mixed team
Asia Team Championships
Gold medal – first place	2026 Qingdao	Men's team
Silver medal – second place	2016 Hyderabad	Men's team
Bronze medal – third place	2020 Manila	Men's team
Bronze medal – third place	2024 Selangor	Men's team
Summer Universiade
Silver medal – second place	2017 Taipei	Men's singles
Silver medal – second place	2017 Taipei	Mixed team
World Junior Championships
Silver medal – second place	2012 Chiba	Mixed team
Asian Junior Championships
Gold medal – first place	2012 Gimcheon	Mixed team

Kenta Nishimoto (西本 拳太, Nishimoto Kenta; born 30 August 1994) is a Japanese badminton player who competes in men's singles. A member of the Japanese national team, he plays for the JTEKT Stingers team. He won a silver medal in the men's singles at the 2017 Summer Universiade and a bronze medal at the 2018 Asian Games. Nishimoto was part of Japan winning team at the 2012 Asian Junior Championships and at the 2017 Asia Mixed Team Championships.

== Career ==
=== 2013: First career final ===
In 2013, Nishimoto reached the final of the Russia Open Grand Prix tournament, and became the runner-up after being defeated by Vladimir Ivanov of Russia.

=== 2016: Removal from national team ===
In April 2016, amid a wider illegal casino scandal in Japanese badminton involving Kento Momota and Kenichi Tago, Nishimoto was removed from the Japanese national team by the Nippon Badminton Association and issued a stern warning after admitting that he had visited an illegal casino in Tokyo on two occasions between February and March 2015. Nishimoto stated that he had not gambled during the visits. Japanese media reported that Nishimoto had visited the casino with Tago, who had invited him to accompany him. Chuo University separately suspended Nishimoto from club activities for one month.

=== 2017: Summer Universiade silver ===
Nishimoto returned to the Japanese A national team for the 2017 season. In August, Nishimoto participated in the 2017 Summer Universiade, held in Taipei. He lost to Wang Tzu-wei in the final, 16–21, 15–21, clinching a silver medal.

=== 2018: Asian Games bronze; 2 World Tour finals ===
In January, Nishimoto reached his first final in the BWF World Tour at the 2018 Malaysia Masters. In the final, he lost to then-reigning world champion Viktor Axelsen in the final, 13–21, 23–21, 18–21 in three games.

Later in August, Nishimoto participated in the 2018 Asian Games, held in Jakarta. He lost to home favourite and eventual champion Jonatan Christie in the semi-final, losing 15–21, 21–15, 19–21 in three games, winning a bronze medal.

At the end of the year, Nishimoto made it to another final, the 2018 Hong Kong Open. He lost to Korea's Son Wan-ho in the final, losing 21–14, 17–21, 13–21 in an hour and 29 minutes.

=== 2019–2020 ===
Kicking off the 2019 season, in March, Nishimoto made it to his first final of the year, the 2019 German Open. He lost in the final to compatriot Kento Momota in straight games, losing 10–21, 16–21.

The following year, at the 2020 Thailand Masters, Nishimoto lost to Hong Kong's Ng Ka Long in the final, losing 21–16, 13–21, 12–21 in three games.

=== 2022: First international title ===
In September, Nishimoto made it to his 7th career final, this time at his home event, the 2022 Japan Open. In the final, he beat 6th ranked and 3rd seed Chou Tien-chen in the final, winning 21–19, 21–23, 21–17 in rubber games. After the final, Nishimoto stated that he was "really happy" and also "a bit relieved" after clinching his first title, and thanked the home crowd for their support.

=== 2026 ===
Nishimoto's 2026 season was disrupted by a shoulder injury sustained during the Swiss Open in March, where he was forced to retire during his first-round match. Following the injury, the Badminton Association of Japan announced on 24 March that Nishimoto had withdrawn from the Asian Championships, with Yudai Okimoto named as his replacement. The shoulder injury also forced his withdrawal from the Thomas Cup. During the subsequent rehabilitation period, Nishimoto said that the extended time away from competition gave him an opportunity to reflect on his career and reconnect with the enjoyment of badminton that he had experienced as a child.

Nishimoto returned to competition at the Singapore Open in late May, followed by the Indonesia Open in June, but was eliminated in the first round of both tournaments. At the Japan Open in July, he again exited in the first round, losing to Indonesia's Alwi Farhan. Afterward, Nishimoto stated that although his shoulder had considerably improved and was not the cause of his defeat, he had yet to regain his match sharpness because he had played substantially fewer matches than in the previous season. At the World Championships in August, he advanced past the first round by defeating fifth seed Christo Popov of France in straight games.

== Achievements ==
=== Asian Games ===
Men's singles
Year	Venue	Opponent	Score	Result	Ref.
2018	Istora Gelora Bung Karno, Jakarta, Indonesia	(Indonesia) Jonatan Christie	15–21, 21–15, 19–21	Bronze	

=== Summer Universiade ===
Men's singles
Year	Venue	Opponent	Score	Result	Ref.
2017	Taipei Gymnasium, Taipei, Taiwan	(Chinese Taipei) Wang Tzu-wei	16–21, 15–21	Silver	

=== BWF World Tour (3 titles, 8 runners-up) ===
The BWF World Tour, which was announced on 19 March 2017 and implemented in 2018, is a series of elite badminton tournaments sanctioned by the Badminton World Federation (BWF). The BWF World Tour is divided into levels of World Tour Finals, Super 1000, Super 750, Super 500, Super 300, and the BWF Tour Super 100.

Men's singles
Year	Tournament	Level	Opponent	Score	Result	Ref.
2018	Malaysia Masters	Super 500	(Denmark) Viktor Axelsen	13–21, 23–21, 18–21	(silver) Runner-up	
2018	Hong Kong Open	Super 500	(South Korea) Son Wan-ho	21–14, 17–21, 13–21	(silver) Runner-up	
2019	German Open	Super 300	(Japan) Kento Momota	10–21, 16–21	(silver) Runner-up	
2020	Thailand Masters	Super 300	(Hong Kong) Ng Ka Long	21–16, 13–21, 12–21	(silver) Runner-up	
2022	Japan Open	Super 750	(Chinese Taipei) Chou Tien-chen	21–19, 21–23, 21–17	(gold) Winner	
2023	Spain Masters	Super 300	(Japan) Kanta Tsuneyama	15–21, 21–18, 21–19	(gold) Winner	
2023	Hong Kong Open	Super 500	(Indonesia) Jonatan Christie	21–12, 20–22, 18–21	(silver) Runner-up	
2023	China Masters	Super 750	(Japan) Kodai Naraoka	13–21, 13–21	(silver) Runner-up	
2023	Syed Modi International	Super 300	(Chinese Taipei) Chi Yu-jen	22–20, 12–21, 17–21	(silver) Runner-up	
2025	Canada Open	Super 300	(Canada) Victor Lai	21–13, 21–14	(gold) Winner	
2025	Japan Masters	Super 500	(Japan) Kodai Naraoka	11–21, 21–10, 15–21	(silver) Runner-up	

=== BWF Superseries (1 runner-up) ===
The BWF Superseries, which was launched on 14 December 2006 and implemented in 2007, was a series of elite badminton tournaments, sanctioned by the Badminton World Federation (BWF). BWF Superseries levels were Superseries and Superseries Premier. A season of Superseries consisted of twelve tournaments around the world that had been introduced since 2011. Successful players were invited to the Superseries Finals, which were held at the end of each year.

Men's singles
Year	Tournament	Opponent	Score	Result	Ref.
2017	French Open	(India) Srikanth Kidambi	14–21, 13–21	(silver) Runner-up	

BWF Super Series tournament

=== BWF Grand Prix (1 runner-up) ===
The BWF Grand Prix had two levels, the Grand Prix and Grand Prix Gold. It was a series of badminton tournaments sanctioned by the Badminton World Federation (BWF) and played between 2007 and 2017.

Men's singles
Year	Tournament	Opponent	Score	Result	Ref.
2013	Russian Open	(Russia) Vladimir Ivanov	17–21, 21–15, 14–21	(silver) Runner-up	

BWF Grand Prix tournament
