= Badminton at the 2018 Asian Games – Men's team =

Men's team at the 2018 Asian Games
- Venue: Istora Gelora Bung Karno
- Dates: 19–22 August
- Competitors: 106 from 13 nations

Medalists
gold medal	China; Chen Long, Li Junhui, Lin Dan, Liu Cheng, Liu Yuchen, Qiao Bin, Shi Yuqi, Wang Yilü, Zhang Nan, Zheng Siwei
silver medal	Indonesia; Tontowi Ahmad, Mohammad Ahsan, Fajar Alfian, Muhammad Rian Ardianto, Jonatan Christie, Marcus Fernaldi Gideon, Anthony Sinisuka Ginting, Ihsan Maulana Mustofa, Kevin Sanjaya Sukamuljo, Ricky Karanda Suwardi
bronze medal	Chinese Taipei; Chen Hung-ling, Chou Tien-chen, Hsu Jen-hao, Lee Jhe-huei, Lee Yang, Lu Ching-yao, Wang Chi-lin, Wang Tzu-wei, Yang Chih-chieh, Yang Po-han
bronze medal	Japan; Takuro Hoki, Takuto Inoue, Takeshi Kamura, Yuki Kaneko, Kento Momota, Kenta Nishimoto, Keigo Sonoda, Riichi Takeshita, Kanta Tsuneyama, Yuta Watanabe

The badminton men's team tournament at the 2018 Asian Games took place from 19 to 22 August at the Istora Gelora Bung Karno in Jakarta. The draw for the team event was held on 16 August.

South Korea team was the gold medalist in the last edition of the Asian Games in Incheon 2014, and this time China's team led the seeding.

China won the gold medal after defeating second-seed and host Indonesia 3–1 in the final. Japan and Chinese Taipei shared the bronze medal after losing in the semi-finals.

== Schedule ==
All times are Western Indonesia Time (UTC+07:00)

Date	Time	Event
Sunday, 19 August 2018	09:00	Round of 16
Monday, 20 August 2018	14:00	Quarterfinals
Tuesday, 21 August 2018	18:00	Semifinals
Wednesday, 22 August 2018	18:00	Gold medal match

== Results ==
Legend

- WO — Won by walkover

Round of 16
Hong Kong	WO
Mongolia
Nepal	3
Pakistan	1
South Korea	3
Thailand	1
Malaysia	0
3	Japan	3
Maldives	0
India	3

Quarterfinals
1	China	3
Hong Kong	0
4	Chinese Taipei	3
Nepal	0
South Korea	0
3	Japan	3
India	1
2	Indonesia	3

Semifinals
1	China	3
4	Chinese Taipei	1
3	Japan	1
2	Indonesia	3

Gold medal match
1	China	3
2	Indonesia	1

=== Round of 16 ===
19 August	Hong Kong	3–0	Mongolia

—	2–0	—	Walkover
—	2–0	—	Walkover
—	2–0	—	Walkover

19 August	Nepal	3–1	Pakistan

Ratnajit Tamang	2–0	Irfan Saeed Bhatti	21–12, 21–11
Dipesh Dhami	2–0	Azeem Sarwar	21–16, 21–10
Nabin Shrestha	1–2	Rizwan Azam	21–13, 18–21, 15–21
Dipesh Dhami / Ratnajit Tamang	2–1	Rizwan Azam / Sulehri Kashif Ali	21–17, 17–21, 21–5

19 August	South Korea	3–1	Thailand

Son Wan-ho	2–0	Kantaphon Wangcharoen	24–22, 21–18
Kang Min-hyuk / Kim Won-ho	2–0	Tinn Isriyanet / Kittisak Namdash	21–17, 21–12
Lee Dong-keun	0–2	Khosit Phetpradab	9–21, 18–21
Choi Sol-gyu / Seo Seung-jae	2–0	Nipitphon Phuangphuapet / Dechapol Puavaranukroh	21–12, 21–17

19 August	Malaysia	0–3	Japan

Liew Daren	0–2	Kento Momota	13–21, 14–21
Goh V Shem / Tan Wee Kiong	0–2	Takeshi Kamura / Keigo Sonoda	18–21, 18–21
Lee Zii Jia	0–2	Kenta Nishimoto	18–21, 17–21

19 August	Maldives	0–3	India

Hussein Zayan Shaheed	0–2	Srikanth Kidambi	4–21, 5–21
Sarim Mohamed	0–2	H. S. Prannoy	8–21, 6–21
Mohamed Ajfan Rasheed	0–2	B. Sai Praneeth	7–21, 8–21

=== Quarterfinals ===
20 August	China	3–0	Hong Kong

Shi Yuqi	2–0	Ng Ka Long	21–15, 21–11
Li Junhui / Liu Yuchen	2–0	Tang Chun Man / Yeung Ming Nok	21–13, 21–13
Chen Long	2–0	Wong Wing Ki	21–13, 21–14

20 August	Chinese Taipei	3–0	Nepal

Chou Tien-chen	2–0	Ratnajit Tamang	21–16, 21–13
Wang Tzu-wei	2–0	Dipesh Dhami	21–5, 21–14
Hsu Jen-hao	2–0	Nabin Shrestha	21–10, 21–11

20 August	South Korea	0–3	Japan

Son Wan-ho	0–2	Kento Momota	16–21, 14–21
Kang Min-hyuk / Kim Won-ho	0–2	Takeshi Kamura / Keigo Sonoda	13–21, 13–21
Heo Kwang-hee	0–2	Kenta Nishimoto	19–21, 9–21

20 August	India	1–3	Indonesia

Srikanth Kidambi	1–2	Anthony Sinisuka Ginting	21–23, 22–20, 10–21
Satwiksairaj Rankireddy / Chirag Shetty	1–2	Marcus Fernaldi Gideon / Kevin Sanjaya Sukamuljo	21–19, 19–21, 16–21
H. S. Prannoy	2–1	Jonatan Christie	21–15, 19–21, 21–19
Manu Attri / B. Sumeeth Reddy	0–2	Fajar Alfian / Muhammad Rian Ardianto	14–21, 18–21

=== Semifinals ===
21 August	China	3–1	Chinese Taipei

Shi Yuqi	0–2	Chou Tien-chen	13–21, 19–21
Li Junhui / Liu Yuchen	2–1	Chen Hung-ling / Wang Chi-lin	19–21, 21–12, 21–9
Chen Long	2–1	Wang Tzu-wei	18–21, 21–13, 21–17
Liu Cheng / Zhang Nan	2–0	Lee Jhe-huei / Lee Yang	21–13, 21–17

21 August	Japan	1–3	Indonesia

Kento Momota	2–1	Anthony Sinisuka Ginting	14–21, 21–14, 21–16
Takeshi Kamura / Keigo Sonoda	0–2	Marcus Fernaldi Gideon / Kevin Sanjaya Sukamuljo	18–21, 12–21
Kenta Nishimoto	0–2	Jonatan Christie	15–21, 19–21
Takuto Inoue / Yuki Kaneko	0–2	Fajar Alfian / Muhammad Rian Ardianto	10–21, 10–21

=== Gold medal match ===
21 August	China	3–1	Indonesia

Shi Yuqi	2–1	Anthony Sinisuka Ginting	14–21, 23–21, 21–20, Retired
Li Junhui / Liu Yuchen	0–2	Marcus Fernaldi Gideon / Kevin Sanjaya Sukamuljo	17–21, 18–21
Chen Long	2–1	Jonatan Christie	19–21, 21–16, 21–18
Liu Cheng / Zhang Nan	2–1	Fajar Alfian / Muhammad Rian Ardianto	21–18, 17–21, 21–18

== Non-participating athletes ==
- Lin Dan (CHN)
- Qiao Bin (CHN)
- Wang Yilü (CHN)
- Zheng Siwei (CHN)
- Yonny Chung (HKG)
- Hu Yun (HKG)
- Lee Cheuk Yiu (HKG)
- Lee Chun Hei (HKG)
- Or Chin Chung (HKG)
- Tam Chun Hei (HKG)
- Tontowi Ahmad (INA)
- Mohammad Ahsan (INA)
- Ihsan Maulana Mustofa (INA)
- Ricky Karanda Suwardi (INA)
- Pranav Chopra (IND)
- Sameer Verma (IND)
- Sourabh Verma (IND)
- Takuro Hoki (JPN)
- Riichi Takeshita (JPN)
- Kanta Tsuneyama (JPN)
- Yuta Watanabe (JPN)
- Ha Young-woong (KOR)
- Kim Jae-hwan (KOR)
- Park Kyung-hoon (KOR)
- Chan Peng Soon (MAS)
- Goh Soon Huat (MAS)
- Leong Jun Hao (MAS)
- Ong Yew Sin (MAS)
- Soong Joo Ven (MAS)
- Teo Ee Yi (MAS)
- Ahmed Thoif Mohamed (MDV)
- Mönkhbatyn Batdavaa (MGL)
- Byambajavyn Khuvituguldur (MGL)
- Enkhbatyn Sumiyaasüren (MGL)
- Gombodorjiin Temüülen (MGL)
- Inkarat Apisuk (THA)
- Suppanyu Avihingsanon (THA)
- Kittinupong Kedren (THA)
- Pannawit Thongnuam (THA)
- Lu Ching-yao (TPE)
- Yang Chih-chieh (TPE)
- Yang Po-han (TPE)
