= 2019 BWF World Championships – Men's singles =

Badminton tournament in Switzerland

Men's singles at the 2019 BWF World Championships
- Venue: St. Jakobshalle
- Location: Basel, Switzerland
- Dates: 19–25 August

Medalists
gold medal	Kento Momota	Japan
silver medal	Anders Antonsen	Denmark
bronze medal	B. Sai Praneeth	India
bronze medal	Kantaphon Wangcharoen	Thailand

The men's singles tournament of the 2019 BWF World Championships (World Badminton Championships) took place from 19 to 25 August.

== Seeds ==
The seeding list is based on the World Rankings from 30 July 2019.

1. (Japan) Kento Momota (champion)
2. (Chinese Taipei) Chou Tien-chen (quarterfinals)
3. (China) Chen Long (quarterfinals)
4. (Indonesia) Jonatan Christie (quarterfinals)
5. (Denmark) Anders Antonsen (final)
6. (Indonesia) Anthony Sinisuka Ginting (third round)
7. (India) Srikanth Kidambi (third round)
8. (Japan) Kenta Nishimoto (third round)

9. (Hong Kong) Ng Ka Long (third round)
10. (India) Sameer Verma (first round)
11. (China) Lin Dan (second round)
12. (Thailand) Kantaphon Wangcharoen (semifinals)
13. (Japan) Kanta Tsuneyama (third round)
14. (Malaysia) Lee Zii Jia (quarterfinals)
15. (Indonesia) Tommy Sugiarto (second round)
16. (India) B. Sai Praneeth (semifinals)

Click on the seed number of a player to go to their draw section.

== Draw ==
=== Finals ===
Semifinals
1	(Japan) Kento Momota	21	21
16	(India) B. Sai Praneeth	13	8
5	(Denmark) Anders Antonsen	21	21
12	(Thailand) Kantaphon Wangcharoen	15	10

Final
1	(Japan) Kento Momota	21	21
5	(Denmark) Anders Antonsen	9	3

=== Top half ===
==== Section 1 ====
First round
1	(Japan) K Momota	21	21
(Vietnam) Phạm C C	9	10
(Spain) L E Peñalver	21	21
(Belgium) M Moreels	15	14
11	(China) Lin D	16	21	21
(Vietnam) Nguyễn T M	21	12	12
(India) Prannoy K	17	21	21
(Finland) E Heino	21	10	11
8	(Japan) K Nishimoto	21	21
(Finland) K Koljonen	11	14
(Chinese Taipei) Wang T-w	21	21
(Italy) R Maddaloni	6	16
14	(Malaysia) Lee Z J	21	21
(Brazil) Y Coelho de Oliveira	17	15
(China) Lu GZ	21	21
(Germany) K Schäfer	12	15

Second round
1	(Japan) K Momota	21	21
(Spain) L E Peñalver	10	7
11	(China) Lin D	11	21	7
(India) Prannoy K	21	13	21
8	(Japan) K Nishimoto	25	13	21
(Chinese Taipei) Wang T-w	23	21	16
14	(Malaysia) Lee Z J	12	21	21
(China) Lu GZ	21	14	15

Third round
1	(Japan) K Momota	21	21
(India) Prannoy K	19	12
8	(Japan) K Nishimoto	15	21	20
14	(Malaysia) Lee Z J	21	11	22

Quarterfinals
1	(Japan) K Momota	21	21
14	(Malaysia) Lee Z J	12	8

==== Section 2 ====
First round
4	(Indonesia) J Christie	21	21
(England) R Ouseph	15	19
(Czech Republic) M Ludík	14	12
(South Korea) Heo K-h	21	21
15	(Indonesia) T Sugiarto	21	21
(Sri Lanka) N Karunaratne	18	12
(France) B Leverdez
(Denmark) J Ø. Jørgensen	w	/	o
6	(Indonesia) A S Ginting	21	21
(Mauritius) G Paul	15	15
(Estonia) R Must	21	11	15
(England) T Penty	10	21	21
16	(India) B. Sai Praneeth	21	21
(Canada) J Ho-shue	17	16
(South Korea) Lee D-k	21	21
(Australia) D Fan	12	10

Second round
4	(Indonesia) J Christie	21	21
(South Korea) Heo K-h	14	17
15	(Indonesia) T Sugiarto	11	15
(Denmark) J Ø. Jørgensen	21	21
6	(Indonesia) A S Ginting	21	21
(England) T Penty	11	19
16	(India) B. Sai Praneeth	21	21
(South Korea) Lee D-k	16	15

Third round
4	(Indonesia) J Christie	21	21
(Denmark) J Ø. Jørgensen	12	16
6	(Indonesia) A S Ginting	19	13
16	(India) B. Sai Praneeth	21	21

Quarterfinals
4	(Indonesia) J Christie	22	14
16	(India) B. Sai Praneeth	24	21

=== Bottom half ===
==== Section 3 ====
First round
(Mexico) L Muñoz	21	21
(Hungary) G Krausz	15	16
(Spain) P Abián	19	5
13	(Japan) K Tsuneyama	21	21
(Malaysia) Liew D	21	21
(Thailand) K Phetpradab	19	13
(Guatemala) K Cordón
5	(Denmark) A Antonsen	w	/	o
(Sweden) F Burestedt	21	21
(Czech Republic) A Mendrek	11	18
(Turkey) E Lale	26	6	13
9	(Hong Kong) Ng K L	24	21	21
(Hong Kong) Lee C Y	21	21
(China) Huang YX	13	14
(Russia) V Malkov	14	17
3	(China) Chen L	21	21

Second round
(Mexico) L Muñoz	12	3
13	(Japan) K Tsuneyama	21	21
(Malaysia) Liew D	17	13
5	(Denmark) A Antonsen	21	21
(Sweden) F Burestedt	14	9
9	(Hong Kong) Ng K L	21	21
(Hong Kong) Lee C Y	20	14
3	(China) Chen L	22	21

Third round
13	(Japan) K Tsuneyama	21	18
5	(Denmark) A Antonsen	23	21
9	(Hong Kong) Ng K L	13	21	16
3	(China) Chen L	21	17	21

Quarterfinals
5	(Denmark) A Antonsen	22	21
3	(China) Chen L	20	10

==== Section 4 ====
First round
(Ukraine) A Pochtarov	18	21	21
(Austria) L Wraber	21	15	16
(Netherlands) M Caljouw	12	17
12	(Thailand) K Wangcharoen	21	21
(Israel) M Zilberman	21	22
(Switzerland) C Kirchmayr	18	20
(Republic of Ireland) N Nguyen	21	16	6
7	(India) S Kidambi	17	21	21
(France) T Rouxel	21	21
(Russia) S Sirant	18	7
(Singapore) Loh K Y	15	21	21
10	(India) S Verma	21	15	10
(Poland) M Rogalski	19	20
(Croatia) Z Đurkinjak	21	22
(Denmark) H-K Vittinghus	15	21	17
2	(Chinese Taipei) Chou T-c	21	17	21

Second round
(Ukraine) A Pochtarov	9	10
12	(Thailand) K Wangcharoen	21	21
(Israel) M Zilberman	21	13	16
7	(India) S Kidambi	13	21	21
(France) T Rouxel	21	13	11
(Singapore) Loh K Y	18	21	21
(Croatia) Z Đurkinjak	14	10
2	(Chinese Taipei) Chou T-c	21	21

Third round
12	(Thailand) K Wangcharoen	21	21
7	(India) S Kidambi	14	13
(Singapore) Loh K Y	13	21	17
2	(Chinese Taipei) Chou T-c	21	18	21

Quarterfinals
12	(Thailand) K Wangcharoen	21	11	21
2	(Chinese Taipei) Chou T-c	16	21	14
