= Anthony Sinisuka Ginting =

Indonesian badminton player (born 1996)

Personal information
- Born: 20 October 1996 (age 30) Cimahi, West Java, Indonesia
- Years active: 2013–present
- Height: 1.71 m (5 ft 7 in)
- Weight: 66 kg (146 lb)
- Spouse: Mitzi Abigail Purnama (m. 2024)

Sport
- Country: Indonesia
- Sport: Badminton
- Handedness: Right
- Coached by: Irwansyah; Harry Hartono

Men's singles
- Career record: 299 wins, 167 losses
- Highest ranking: 2 (24 January 2023)
- Current ranking: 53 (10 November 2026)
- BWF profile
Medal record
Men's badminton
Representing Indonesia
Olympic Games
Bronze medal – third place	2020 Tokyo	Men's singles
Sudirman Cup
Bronze medal – third place	2019 Nanning	Mixed team
Thomas Cup
Gold medal – first place	2020 Aarhus	Men's team
Silver medal – second place	2016 Kunshan	Men's team
Silver medal – second place	2022 Bangkok	Men's team
Silver medal – second place	2024 Chengdu	Men's team
Bronze medal – third place	2018 Bangkok	Men's team
Asian Games
Silver medal – second place	2018 Jakarta–Palembang	Men's team
Bronze medal – third place	2018 Jakarta–Palembang	Men's singles
Asian Championships
Gold medal – first place	2023 Dubai	Men's singles
Asia Team Championships
Gold medal – first place	2016 Hyderabad	Men's team
Gold medal – first place	2018 Alor Setar	Men's team
Gold medal – first place	2020 Manila	Men's team
Bronze medal – third place	2026 Qingdao	Men's team
SEA Games
Gold medal – first place	2015 Singapore	Men's team
Gold medal – first place	2019 Philippines	Men's team
Youth Olympic Games
Bronze medal – third place	2014 Nanjing	Boys' singles
World Junior Championships
Silver medal – second place	2014 Alor Setar	Mixed team
Bronze medal – third place	2014 Alor Setar	Boys' singles

Anthony Sinisuka Ginting (Indonesian pronunciation: [ˈɡintɪŋ]; born 20 October 1996) is an Indonesian badminton player. He first rose to senior prominence when he won the bronze medal at the 2018 Asian Games, having won a 2014 Youth Olympic bronze in 2014. At the 2020 Olympics, he won bronze in the men's singles event, becoming the first Youth Olympic badminton medalist to win a medal at the Olympics. Ginting was part of Indonesia's winning team at the 2020 Thomas Cup.

== Early life ==
Ginting was born in Cimahi to parents Edison Ginting and Lucia Sriati. He is of Karo descent. Ginting is a Christian.

He first learned badminton in kindergarten from his father, who also brought him to practice more intensely after he started winning local tournaments at the age of 9.

As a child, he joined PB SGS PLN in Bandung, West Java, a badminton club that fostered Indonesian badminton legend Taufik Hidayat. Ginting was later called up to the Indonesian national team at 16 years old.

== Career ==
=== 2013–2014: World Junior Championships and Youth Olympics bronze medals ===
Ginting participated at the Indonesian Masters Grand Prix Gold, Vietnam International Challenge, Maldives International Challenge, Malaysia International Challenge and Asia Junior Championships in Kota Kinabalu, Malaysia.

In 2014, Ginting reached the Asian Junior Championships quarterfinals in Taipei, where he lost 13–21, 15–21 to Kanta Tsuneyama of Japan. Ginting then participated at the World Junior Championships in Alor Setar, Malaysia where he won a boys' singles bronze medal after bowed out in the semifinal to Shi Yuqi of China for 19–21, 15–21. He also competed at the 2014 Summer Youth Olympics in Nanjing, China and brought home a bronze medal after beating Aditya Joshi of India in the bronze-final match with a straight games 21–17, 21–16. In addition to competing in some international challenge tournaments, he also played in the BWF Grand Prix tournaments such as Chinese Taipei Open, Vietnam Open and Indonesian Masters.

=== 2015–2016: First Indonesia Open and Thomas Cup Final ===
Starting his journey as a rookie in the BWF Superseries event from the qualifying stage, Ginting moved into the quarterfinals after creating an upset with a rubber games 14–21, 22–20, 21–13 win over India's top shuttler and fourth seed Srikanth Kidambi in the second round of the Indonesia Open. His Indonesia Open campaign was eventually halted after losing to the eighth seed and 2012 BWF World Junior champion Kento Momota of Japan in quarterfinals with a rubber games 21–13, 16–21, 15–21.That was the beginning of his meeting with the Indonesia Open champion. At the Hong Kong Open, Ginting met again with Kento Momota in the second round and finally Ginting was able to get his revenge by defeating him 21–7, 21–15. Ginting was part of the Indonesian men's team that won a gold medal at the SEA Games in Singapore, after beating Thailand men's team 3–2 in the final.

Participating in the Chinese Taipei Open as an unheralded shuttler, Ginting reached the quarterfinals after defeating twelfth-seeded fellow Indonesian Dionysius Hayom Rumbaka with a straight sets 21–16, 21–14 in the third round of the tournament. In the first round, he surprisingly defeated the eighth seed and 2009 BWF World Junior Champion Tian Houwei of China with a score of 21–13, 21–14. He then lost to the defending champion, former world No. 1 and two-time Olympic gold medalist Lin Dan of China with a straight games 7–21, 20–22 in the quarterfinals.

In 2016, Ginting with the Indonesian men's team participating in the Thomas Cup, the team managed to reach the final after beating South Korea 3–1 in the semi-final and bringing the Indonesian men's team to the final. In the final, the team was challenged by Denmark. The Indonesian men's team was defeated by Denmark 3–2 on aggregate in the final. Ginting with the Indonesian men's team also succeeded in bringing the men's team trophy to the Asia Team Championships in Hyderabad, India. They beat Japan 3–2 on aggregate. At the Australian open event, Ginting managed to reach the semi-finals after defeating the 2016 Olympic champion Chen Long in the quarter-final.

=== 2017: First title in Korea Open and debut at the Sudirman Cup ===
In 2017, Ginting won his first title in the Korea Open after beating compatriot Jonatan Christie through a rubber game 21–13, 19–21, 22–20.

At the Sudirman Cup, Ginting helps the Indonesian team to score a point when defeating 2017 world champion Viktor Axelsen with a score of 13–21, 21–17, 21–14. Indonesia managed to beat Denmark 3–2 on aggregate, but placed in the bottom position of the standings, after lost to India 1–4 a day before.

=== 2018: The first title in the country and the nickname of the giant killer ===
Entering 2018, Ginting started his BWF world tour brilliantly, he managed to become the champion in his homeland of the Indonesia Masters, he managed to beat Kazumasa Sakai in the Final with a score of 21–13, 21–12. Ginting and the Indonesian men's team also managed to win again in these Asia Team Championships after beating China 3–1 in the final.

Ginting competed at the 2018 Asian Games in Jakarta, Indonesia. In the men's team event, he helped Indonesia team made it to the final against China. in the final, Ginting had to face Shi Yuqi, the first game was won by Ginting but Shi Yuqi was able to overtake and win the second game. In the decider, Ginting experienced cramps in his leg so he retired and had to lose the match with a score of 14–21, 23–21, 21–20. In the end, Indonesia had to recognize China's superiority by winning 3–1. Ginting then started his match again in individual event, he had to face 2018 World champion Kento Momota in the second round and 2016 Olympic champion Chen Long in the quarter-finals. Ginting managed to beat the two of them in straight games. In the semifinals he had to face Chou Tien-chen, the match was very exciting but Ginting had to admit Chou's superiority with a thin score of 21–16, 21–23, 17–21. Ginting had to be satisfied with the bronze medal.

Ginting then took a world tour by participating in the China Open tournament, in which Ginting had to fight difficult opponents, the World and Olympics champion Lin Dan, 2017 World champion Viktor Axelsen, World and Olympics champion Chen Long, and in the semifinals again had to faced off Asian Games finalist Chou Tien-chen. He managed to reach the final and had to face off the 2018 World champion Kento Momota. Ginting managed to prove he was worthy of being reckoned with by defeating many of the world's badminton champions, because of that he was named the giant killer in the tournament.

=== 2019–2020: Finalists in five tournaments and second title in Indonesia Masters ===
Ginting opened the 2019 season as a quarterfinalists in the Malaysia and Indonesia Masters in January. At the Europe tour in March, Ginting was stopped in the first round to Ng Ka Long in the All England Open, and then defeated by Shi Yuqi at the semi-finals of the Swiss Open. In April, Ginting reached the final of the Singapore Open, lost the match to Kento Momota. As a top seed in the New Zealand Open in May, Ginting was stopped in the quarterfinals with defeat to Lin Dan in rubber games. He then advanced to the final of the Australian Open, but was beaten by his compatriot Jonatan Christie, the head-to-head record between the players stood at 2–3.

In September, Ginting finished runner-up to Momota at the China Open. He has lost his last five matches against Momota since the China Open victory last year. Ginting is again reaching his fourth finals of the year in the Hong Kong Open in November. He lost the title in a close three matches against Lee Cheuk Yiu. Ginting competed in the men's team event at the Philippines SEA Games, and he managed to contribute one point, bringing Indonesia team won the gold medal against Malaysia 3–1. He has qualified to the year-end tournament Guangzhou World Tour Finals, and again lost the final match against Momota, worsening his head-to-head record against Momota to 4–11. His achievements in 2019, brought him to seventh place in the BWF World ranking.

Ginting kicked-off the 2020 season in Malaysia Masters as eight seed. He was defeated by unseeded player Huang Yuxiang in the first round in straight games. A week later, in home soil Indonesia Masters tournament, he finally clinched his first title since the 2018 China Open. Ginting defeated the defending champion Anders Antonsen of Denmark in the final. In February, he helped the Indonesian men's team defend the Asia Team Championships title. Ginting reached a career high as world number 3 in the world ranking on 18 February 2020. In March, the fourth seed Ginting, fell in the early round of Super 1000 tournament All England Open to Rasmus Gemke of Denmark. This is for the fifth time, he has defeated in the early round of the historical tournament All England Open, since his debut in 2016.

=== 2021: Olympic bronze medal and Thomas Cup champion ===
In 2021, Ginting competed at the 2020 Asian Leg tournament held in Thailand as a fifth seed. At the Yonex Thailand Open, he lost to Viktor Axelsen of Denmark in the semi-finals, while at the Toyota Thailand Open he lost to Lee Cheuk Yiu of Hong Kong in the second round. Ranked as number 9 in the season-end ranking, Ginting then secured a spot to compete at the World Tour Finals. Ginting won his first Olympic medal when he beat Kevin Cordón in the bronze medal match at the 2020 Summer Olympics, becoming the first Indonesian Olympic medalist in the men's singles badminton event since Sony Dwi Kuncoro in the 2004 Summer Olympics. He has become the first badminton player to win medals at both the Youth Olympic Games and Olympic Games, following his bronze medal at the Youth Olympic Games in Nanjing in 2014.

In September–October 2021, Ginting played alongside Indonesia team competed at the 2021 Sudirman Cup in Vantaa, Finland. He played three matches at that tournament, won a match against Ivan Sozonov of Russia, and lost 2 matches to Anders Antonsen of Denmark and Lee Zii Jia of Malaysia. The team finished as the quarter-finalists. In the next tournament, he helped the Indonesian team to win the World Men's Team Championships, the 2020 Thomas Cup. In October, he had to retired in the first round of the Denmark Open due to back pain he suffered during the Thomas Cup. He then suffered an early exit in his home tournament, the Indonesia Masters and Open.

=== 2022: Early year struggle, breaking the title drought, resurgence ===
Started the 2022 season by competing in Europe tour, Ginting still shows inconsistency. He had to accept defeat with a landslide score of 7–21, 9–21 to Lakshya Sen in the second round of the German Open and lost to Viktor Axelsen with a score of 4–21, 9–21 in the quarter-finals of the All England Open. He managed to return to form by reaching the semi-finals in the Swiss Open, but stopped by Prannoy H. S. in a close rubber games. Entered the Korea Open as a top seed, he was beaten in the first round by world number 67, Lucas Claerbout. Ginting ended his two-year title drought by winning the Singapore Open. He upset host player, the 2021 World Champions, Loh Kean Yew in the semi-finals, and Japan's youngster, Kodai Naraoka in the final. Ginting competed at the BWF World Championships in August, but lost to eventual champion Axelsen in the quarter-finals. This loss worsened their head-to-head record into 4–10 in Axelsen's favor. Ginting won his second title of the year in the Hylo Open in Saarbrücken, Germany, by defeating Chou Tien-chen in the final. Ginting ended the 2022 tour by competing at the World Tour Finals, and finished runner-up to Axelsen in straight game.

=== 2023: Asian Champion ===
Ginting opened the 2023 season at the Malaysia Open; but was defeated in the quarter-finals round by Japanese player Kanta Tsuneyama. In the following week, he reached the semi-finals of India Open, but was defeated by 8th seed Thai player Kunlavut Vitidsarn. He competed in the home tournament, Indonesia Masters, but lost in the second round to the Chinese player Shi Yuqi.

In February, Ginting joined the Indonesia national badminton team to compete at the Asia Mixed Team Championships, but the team lost in the quarter-finals to South Korea.

In March, Ginting competed in the Europe tour, but lost in the quarter-finals of All England Open to the Danish player Anders Antonsen in three games.

In April, Ginting won his first title of the year in the Asian Championships by defeating Loh Kean Yew of Singapore in the final in straight games. It was Indonesia's first men's singles title after 16 years when Taufik Hidayat won it in 2007.

In May, Ginting alongside the Indonesian team competed at the 2023 Sudirman Cup in Suzhou, China. He played a match in the group stage and won against Brian Yang of Canada. Indonesia advanced to the knockout stage but lost in the quarterfinals against China, where he lost to Shi Yuqi in second match. He then played at the Malaysia Masters, but had to lose in the second round to the Chinese player and eventual finalist Weng Hongyang.

In June, Ginting competed at the Singapore Open, and won his second title of the year and defending his title by defeating Danish player Anders Antonsen in straight games. Ginting then finished as the finalists in the Indonesia Open, losing the match to Viktor Axelsen in straight games.

In late July, Ginting competed at the 2023 Japan Open, but lost in the first round to the Japanese player Kanta Tsuneyama in straight games.

In early August, Ginting competed at the Australian Open, but lost in the quarter-finals to 6th seed Indian player Prannoy H. S. in rubber games. In late August, Ginting withdrew from the World Championships because of the death of his mother.

Ginting returned at the 2023 China Open. Facing Kanta Tsuneyama in three games, he eventually bowed out, 11–21, 21–18, 21–17. He then reached the semi-finals in the Hong Kong Open but was defeated by Kenta Nishimoto in straight game. In his second appearance at the Asian Games, he failed to bring home any medals after lost in the quarter-finals in both the men's singles and team events.

=== 2024: All England's first All Indonesian final in 30 years ===
Ginting managed to defeat first seed Viktor Axelsen at the All England Open in the quarterfinals and Christo Popov in semifinals to create the first all-Indonesian men's singles final in the tournament since Hariyanto Arbi and Ardy Wiranata in 1994. However he lost to compatriot Jonatan Christie in the final.

Ginting made his second appearance at the Olympics in the 2024 Paris, but he failed to advance to the knock-out stages after finishing second in group H, winning once against Howard Shu, and losing to Toma Junior Popov. He was then competed in the Hong Kong and China Opens, but was eliminated in the semi-finals and quarter-finals respectively.

== Awards and nominations ==
Award	Year	Category	Result	Ref.
BWF Awards	2018	Most Improved Player of the Year	Nominated	
Forbes	2019	30 Under 30 Indonesia (Sports)	Placed	
Golden Award SIWO PWI	2019	Favorite Team with 2018 Asian Games men's badminton team	Nominated	
Indonesian Sport Awards	2018	Favorite Male Athlete	Won	
Line Today Choice	2021	Most Favorite Indonesian Athlete	Nominated	
Santini JebreeetMedia Awards	2023	Favorite Athlete	Nominated	
iNews Indonesia Awards	2023	Favorite Athlete	Nominated	
RCTI Indonesian Sports Entertainment Awards	2024	Most Popular Male Athlete	Nominated	

== Achievements ==
=== Olympic Games ===
Men's singles
Year	Venue	Opponent	Score	Result	Ref.
2020	Musashino Forest Sport Plaza; Tokyo, Japan	(Guatemala) Kevin Cordón	21–11, 21–13	Bronze	

=== Asian Games ===
Men's singles
Year	Venue	Opponent	Score	Result	Ref.
2018	Istora Gelora Bung Karno; Jakarta, Indonesia	(Chinese Taipei) Chou Tien-chen	21–16, 21–23, 17–21	Bronze	

=== Asian Championships ===
Men's singles
Year	Venue	Opponent	Score	Result	Ref.
2023	Sheikh Rashid Bin Hamdan Indoor Hall; Dubai, United Arab Emirates	(Singapore) Loh Kean Yew	21–12, 21–8	Gold	

=== Youth Olympic Games ===
Boys' singles
Year	Venue	Opponent	Score	Result	Ref.
2014	Nanjing Sport Institute; Nanjing, China	(India) Aditya Joshi	21–17, 21–16	Bronze	

=== BWF World Junior Championships ===
Boys' singles
Year	Venue	Opponent	Score	Result	Ref.
2014	Stadium Sultan Abdul Halim; Alor Setar, Malaysia	(China) Shi Yuqi	19–21, 15–21	Bronze	

=== BWF World Tour (6 titles, 8 runners-up) ===
The BWF World Tour, which was announced on 19 March 2017 and implemented in 2018, is a series of elite badminton tournaments sanctioned by the Badminton World Federation (BWF). The BWF World Tour is divided into levels of World Tour Finals, Super 1000, Super 750, Super 500, Super 300, and the BWF Tour Super 100.

Men's singles
Year	Tournament	Level	Opponent	Score	Result	Ref.
2018	Indonesia Masters	Super 500	(Japan) Kazumasa Sakai	21–13, 21–12	(gold) Winner	
2018	China Open	Super 1000	(Japan) Kento Momota	23–21, 21–19	(gold) Winner	
2019	Singapore Open	Super 500	(Japan) Kento Momota	21–10, 19–21, 13–21	(silver) Runner-up	
2019	Australian Open	Super 300	(Indonesia) Jonatan Christie	17–21, 21–13, 14–21	(silver) Runner-up	
2019	China Open	Super 1000	(Japan) Kento Momota	21–19, 17–21, 19–21	(silver) Runner-up	
2019	Hong Kong Open	Super 500	(Hong Kong) Lee Cheuk Yiu	21–16, 10–21, 20–22	(silver) Runner-up	
2019	BWF World Tour Finals	World Tour Finals	(Japan) Kento Momota	21–17, 17–21, 14–21	(silver) Runner-up	
2020	Indonesia Masters	Super 500	(Denmark) Anders Antonsen	17–21, 21–15, 21–9	(gold) Winner	
2022	Singapore Open	Super 500	(Japan) Kodai Naraoka	23–21, 21–17	(gold) Winner	
2022	Hylo Open	Super 300	(Chinese Taipei) Chou Tien-chen	18–21, 21–11, 24–22	(gold) Winner	
2022	BWF World Tour Finals	World Tour Finals	(Denmark) Viktor Axelsen	13–21, 14–21	(silver) Runner-up	
2023	Singapore Open	Super 750	(Denmark) Anders Antonsen	21–16, 21–13	(gold) Winner	
2023	Indonesia Open	Super 1000	(Denmark) Viktor Axelsen	14–21, 13–21	(silver) Runner-up	
2024	All England Open	Super 1000	(Indonesia) Jonatan Christie	15–21, 14–21	(silver) Runner-up	

=== BWF Superseries (1 title) ===
The BWF Superseries, which was launched on 14 December 2006 and implemented in 2007, was a series of elite badminton tournaments, sanctioned by the Badminton World Federation (BWF). BWF Superseries levels were Superseries and Superseries Premier. A season of Superseries consisted of twelve tournaments around the world that had been introduced since 2011. Successful players were invited to the Superseries Finals, which were held at the end of each year.

Men's singles
Year	Tournament	Opponent	Score	Result	Ref.
2017	Korea Open	(Indonesia) Jonatan Christie	21–13, 19–21, 22–20	(gold) Winner	

BWF Super Series Finals tournament
BWF Super Series Premier tournament
BWF Super Series tournament

=== BWF Junior International (1 title) ===
Boys' singles
Year	Tournament	Opponent	Score	Result	Ref.
2013	Indonesia Junior International	(Indonesia) Rico Hamdani	21–15, 17–21, 21–19	(gold) Winner	

BWF Junior International Grand Prix tournament
BWF Junior International Challenge tournament
BWF Junior International Series tournament
BWF Junior Future Series tournament

== Performance timeline ==
Key

W	Won	F	Finalist	SF	Semi-finalist
QF	Quarter-finalist	#R	Rounds 4, 3, 2, 1	RR	Round-robin stage
Q#	Qualification round	A	Absent	w/d	Withdrew
G	Gold	S	Silver	B	Bronze
NH	Not held	N/A	Not applicable	DNQ	Did not qualify

=== National team ===
- Junior level

Team events	2014
Asian Junior Championships	QF
World Junior Championships	S

- Senior level

Team events	2015	2016	2017	2018	2019	2020	2021	2022	2023	2024	2025	2026	Ref
SEA Games	G	NH	A	NH	G	NH	A	NH	A	NH	A	NH	
Asia Team Championships	NH	G	NH	G	NH	G	NH	A	NH	A	NH	B	
Asia Mixed Team Championships	NH		A	NH	A	NH			QF	NH	A	NH	
Asian Games	NH			S	NH			QF	NH				
Thomas Cup	NH	S	NH	B	NH	G	NH	S	NH	S	NH	GS	
Sudirman Cup	A	NH	RR	NH	B	NH	QF	NH	QF	NH	A	NH	

=== Individual competitions ===
- Junior level

Events	2013	2014	Ref
Asian Junior Championships	2R	QF	
World Junior Championships	A	B	
Youth Olympic Games	NH	B	

- Senior level

Events	2016	2017	2018	2019	2020	2021	2022	2023	2024	2025	Ref
Asian Championships	1R	1R	2R	1R	NH		QF	G	QF	A	
Asian Games	NH		B	NH			QF	NH			
World Championships	NH	2R	2R	3R	NH	w/d	QF	w/d	NH	1R	
Olympic Games	DNQ	NH			B	NH			RR	NH	

Tournament	BWF Superseries / Grand Prix				BWF World Tour									Best	Ref
Tournament	2014	2015	2016	2017	2018	2019	2020	2021	2022	2023	2024	2025	2026	Best	Ref
Malaysia Open	A		1R	1R	1R	1R	NH		QF	QF	2R	2R	A	QF ('22, '23)	
India Open	A						NH		A	SF	QF	w/d	A	SF ('23)	
Indonesia Masters	1R	SF	1R	NH	W	QF	W	1R	SF	2R	SF	w/d	2R	W ('18, '20)	
Thailand Masters	NH		A	SF	A			NH		A				SF ('17)	
German Open	A				QF	A	NH		2R	A				QF ('18)	
All England Open	A		Q1	1R	1R	1R	1R	w/d	QF	QF	F	A		F ('24)	
Swiss Open	A			SF	A	SF	NH	A	SF	A			SF	SF ('17, '19, '22, '26)	
Orléans Masters	NA				A		NH	A					2R	2R ('26)	
Thailand Open	NH	2R	A				SF	NH	w/d	A			1R	SF ('20)	
Thailand Open	NH	2R	A				2R	NH	w/d	A			1R	SF ('20)	
Malaysia Masters	A	2R	2R	SF	QF	QF	1R	NH	QF	2R	A		2R	SF ('17)	
Singapore Open	A		1R	SF	A	F	NH		W	W	2R	A		W ('22, '23)	
Indonesia Open	A	QF	1R	1R	2R	2R	NH	1R	QF	F	1R	A		F ('23)	
Australian Open	A		SF	2R	A	F	NH		w/d	QF	w/d	A	1R	F ('19)	
Macau Open	A	2R	3R	A			NH			N/A	A		w/d	3R ('16)	
Japan Open	A	Q1	A	1R	QF	QF	NH		w/d	1R	1R	1R	A	QF ('18, '19)	
China Open	A			1R	W	F	NH			1R	QF	1R	A	W ('18)	
Taipei Open	3R	QF	A				NH		A				1R	QF ('15)	
Korea Masters	A	2R	A				NH		A					2R ('15)	
China Masters	A				QF	1R	NH			2R	w/d	1R	A	QF ('18)	
Indonesia Masters Super 100	NA				A		NH		A	A			2R	3R ('26 II)	
Indonesia Masters Super 100	NA				A		NH		A	A			3R	3R ('26 II)	
Vietnam Open	1R	SF	A				NH		A					SF ('15)	
Arctic Open	N/A						NH			A	1R	A		1R ('24)	
Denmark Open	A			1R	1R	1R	A	1R	1R	QF	1R	1R	A	QF ('23)	
Malaysia Super 100	N/A									A			2R	2R ('26)	
French Open	A		2R	QF	1R	SF	NH	w/d	1R	QF	2R	2R	A	SF ('19)	
Hylo Open	A		1R	A					W	A				W ('22)	
Korea Open	A	Q2	A	W	QF	2R	NH		1R	A		2R	QF	W ('17)	
Kaohsiung Masters	NH									A			3R	3R ('26)	
Japan Masters	NH									1R	w/d	A		1R ('23)	
Hong Kong Open	A	SF	1R	1R	2R	F	NH			SF	SF	1R	A	F ('19)	
Syed Modi International	A		1R	A			NH		A					1R ('16)	
Superseries / World Tour Finals	DNQ				RR	F	RR	DNQ	F	RR	DNQ			F ('19, '22)	
Chinese Taipei Masters	N/A	QF	A	N/A										QF ('15)	
New Zealand Open	A		3R	A		QF	NH			N/A				QF ('19)	
Year-end ranking	203	35	40	13	7	7	6	5	5	4	10	58		2	
Tournament	2014	2015	2016	2017	2018	2019	2020	2021	2022	2023	2024	2025	2026	Best	Ref

== Record against selected opponents ==
Record against Year-end Finals finalists, World Championships semi-finalists, and Olympic quarter-finalists. Accurate as of 22 December 2025.

Player	Matches	Win	Lost	Diff.
(China) Chen Long	13	8	5	+3
(China) Lin Dan	5	2	3	–1
(China) Shi Yuqi	12	3	9	–6
(China) Tian Houwei	2	1	1	0
(China) Zhao Junpeng	4	3	1	+2
(Chinese Taipei) Chou Tien-chen	16	10	6	+4
(Denmark) Anders Antonsen	9	6	3	+3
(Denmark) Viktor Axelsen	19	5	14	–9
(Denmark) Jan Ø. Jørgensen	6	2	4	–2
(Denmark) Hans-Kristian Vittinghus	3	2	1	+1
(France) Christo Popov	4	2	2	0
(Guatemala) Kevin Cordón	1	1	0	+1
(India) Parupalli Kashyap	8	8	0	+8
(India) Srikanth Kidambi	7	5	2	+3
(India) Lakshya Sen	3	0	3	–3
(India) B. Sai Praneeth	8	5	3	+2

Player	Matches	Win	Lost	Diff.
(India) Prannoy H. S.	6	2	4	–2
(Indonesia) Sony Dwi Kuncoro	3	1	2	–1
(Indonesia) Tommy Sugiarto	6	3	3	0
(Japan) Kento Momota	16	5	11	–6
(Japan) Kodai Naraoka	4	3	1	+2
(Japan) Sho Sasaki	1	1	0	+1
(Malaysia) Lee Chong Wei	2	0	2	–2
(Malaysia) Lee Zii Jia	6	5	1	+4
(Malaysia) Liew Daren	1	1	0	+1
(Singapore) Loh Kean Yew	9	6	3	+3
(South Korea) Heo Kwang-hee	4	3	1	+2
(South Korea) Son Wan-ho	4	1	3	–2
(Thailand) Kunlavut Vitidsarn	8	3	5	–2
(Thailand) Kantaphon Wangcharoen	10	7	3	+4
(Vietnam) Nguyễn Tiến Minh	1	0	1	–1
