= 2018 BWF World Championships – Men's singles =

Badminton tournament results

Men's singles at the 2018 BWF World Championships
- Venue: Nanjing Youth Olympic Sports Park Indoor Arena
- Location: Nanjing, China
- Dates: 30 July – 5 August

Medalists
gold medal	Kento Momota	Japan
silver medal	Shi Yuqi	China
bronze medal	Chen Long	China
bronze medal	Liew Daren	Malaysia

The men's singles tournament of the 2018 BWF World Championships (World Badminton Championships) took place from 30 July to 5 August.

== Seeds ==
The seeding list is based on the World Rankings from 12 July 2018.

1. (Denmark) Viktor Axelsen (quarterfinals)
2. (Malaysia) Lee Chong Wei (withdrew)
3. (China) Shi Yuqi (final)
4. (South Korea) Son Wan-ho (withdrew)
5. (India) Srikanth Kidambi (third round)
6. (Japan) Kento Momota (champion)
7. (Chinese Taipei) Chou Tien-chen (quarterfinals)
8. (China) Chen Long (semifinals)

9. (China) Lin Dan (third round)
10. (Hong Kong) Ng Ka Long (third round)
11. (India) Prannoy Kumar (second round)
12. (Indonesia) Anthony Sinisuka Ginting (second round)
13. (Indonesia) Jonatan Christie (first round)
14. (Japan) Kenta Nishimoto (third round)
15. (Indonesia) Tommy Sugiarto (second round)
16. (Denmark) Anders Antonsen (third round)

Click on the seed number of a player to go to their draw section.

== Draw ==
=== Finals ===
Semifinals
8	(China) Chen Long	11	17
3	(China) Shi Yuqi	21	21
6	(Japan) Kento Momota	21	21
(Malaysia) Liew Daren	16	5

Final
3	(China) Shi Yuqi	11	13
6	(Japan) Kento Momota	21	21

=== Top half ===
==== Section 1 ====
First round
1	(Denmark) V Axelsen	21	21
(Portugal) D Nuno Anjo	8	7
(China) Huang YX	21	21
(Vietnam) Phạm C C	19	11
10	(Hong Kong) Ng K L	21	21
(Bulgaria) I Rusev	13	10
(Estonia) R Must	21	15	21
(Russia) V Malkov	13	21	15
8	(China) Chen L	21	21
(Chinese Taipei) Hsu J-h	13	15
(Mauritius) G Paul	15	12
(Thailand) K Phetpradab	21	21
14	(Japan) K Nishimoto	21	21
(Italy) R Maddaloni	13	18
(Russia) S Sirant	21	21
(Czech Republic) M Ludik	14	16

Second round
1	(Denmark) V Axelsen	21	21
(China) Huang YX	17	8
10	(Hong Kong) Ng K L	21	21
(Estonia) R Must	18	18
8	(China) Chen L	21	21
(Thailand) K Phetpradab	16	11
14	(Japan) K Nishimoto	21	21
(Russia) S Sirant	15	2

Third round
1	(Denmark) V Axelsen	21	21
10	(Hong Kong) Ng K L	19	18
8	(China) Chen L	21	21
14	(Japan) K Nishimoto	18	19

Quarterfinals
1	(Denmark) V Axelsen	19	11
8	(China) Chen L	21	21

==== Section 2 ====
First round
3	(China) Shi YQ	21	21
(Czech Republic) A Mendrek	13	11
(Croatia) Z Đurkinjak	17	13
(England) R Ouseph	21	21
9	(China) Lin D	21	21
(Netherlands) M Caljouw	14	14
(France) L Corvée	13	10
(India) S Verma	21	21
7	(Chinese Taipei) Chou T-c	21	21
(Finland) E Heino	9	9
(Poland) A Dziółko	11	6
(Denmark) R Gemke	21	21
11	(India) Prannoy K	21	21
(New Zealand) A Manota	12	11
(Hong Kong) Wong W K	20	21	4^{r}
(Brazil) Y Coelho de Oliveira	22	19	11

Second round
3	(China) Shi YQ	21	21
(England) R Ouseph	18	9
9	(China) Lin D	21	21
(India) S Verma	17	14
7	(Chinese Taipei) Chou T-c	21	21
(Denmark) R Gemke	8	17
11	(India) Prannoy K	21	16	15
(Brazil) Y Coelho de Oliveira	8	21	21

Third round
3	(China) Shi YQ	21	21
9	(China) Lin D	15	9
7	(Chinese Taipei) Chou T-c	21	21
(Brazil) Y Coelho de Oliveira	11	7

Quarterfinals
3	(China) Shi YQ	16	21	21
7	(Chinese Taipei) Chou T-c	21	15	18

=== Bottom half ===
==== Section 3 ====
First round
(Vietnam) Nguyễn T M	21	21
(Belgium) M Moreels	10	5
(Thailand) T Saensomboonsuk
16	(Denmark) A Antonsen	w	/	o
(Austria) L Wraber	21	13	21
(Turkey) E Lale	15	21	17
(Ukraine) A Pochtarov	13	12
6	(Japan) K Momota	21	21
(Germany) K Schäfer	13	21	7
(Denmark) H-K Vittinghus	21	17	21
(Finland) K Koljonen	16	14
15	(Indonesia) T Sugiarto	21	21
(Spain) L E Peñalver	w	/	o
(Japan) K Sakai
(India) B S Praneeth	w	/	o
4	(South Korea) Son W-h

Second round
(Vietnam) Nguyễn T M	16	18
16	(Denmark) A Antonsen	21	21
(Austria) L Wraber	8	10
6	(Japan) K Momota	21	21
(Denmark) H-K Vittinghus	21	21
15	(Indonesia) T Sugiarto	14	15
(Spain) L E Peñalver	18	11
(India) B S Praneeth	21	21

Third round
16	(Denmark) A Antonsen	21	17	8
6	(Japan) K Momota	13	21	21
(Denmark) H-K Vittinghus	13	11
(India) B S Praneeth	21	21

Quarterfinals
6	(Japan) K Momota	21	21
(India) B S Praneeth	12	12

==== Section 4 ====
First round
(Israel) M Zilberman	12	21	21
(Sri Lanka) N Karunaratne	21	17	10
(Malaysia) Liew D	21	21
13	(Indonesia) J Christie	12	16
(England) T Penty	18	6
(Spain) P Abián	21	21
(Republic of Ireland) N Nguyen	15	16
5	(India) S Kidambi	21	21
(Japan) K Tsuneyama	21	21
(Hungary) G Krausz	4	5
(Thailand) S Avihingsanon	19	14
12	(Indonesia) A S Ginting	21	21
(Canada) J Ho-shue	21	15	12
(Chinese Taipei) Wang T-w	15	21	21
(France) B Leverdez	w	/	o
2	(Malaysia) Lee C W

Second round
(Israel) M Zilberman	16	16
(Malaysia) Liew D	21	21
(Spain) P Abián	15	21	14
5	(India) S Kidambi	21	12	21
(Japan) K Tsuneyama	21	21
12	(Indonesia) A S Ginting	17	13
(Chinese Taipei) Wang T-w	18	19
(France) B Leverdez	21	21

Third round
(Malaysia) Liew D	21	21
5	(India) S Kidambi	18	18
(Japan) K Tsuneyama	21	21
(France) B Leverdez	17	15

Quarterfinals
(Malaysia) Liew D	22	21	22
(Japan) K Tsuneyama	20	23	20
