= Tommy Sugiarto =

Indonesian badminton player (born 1988)

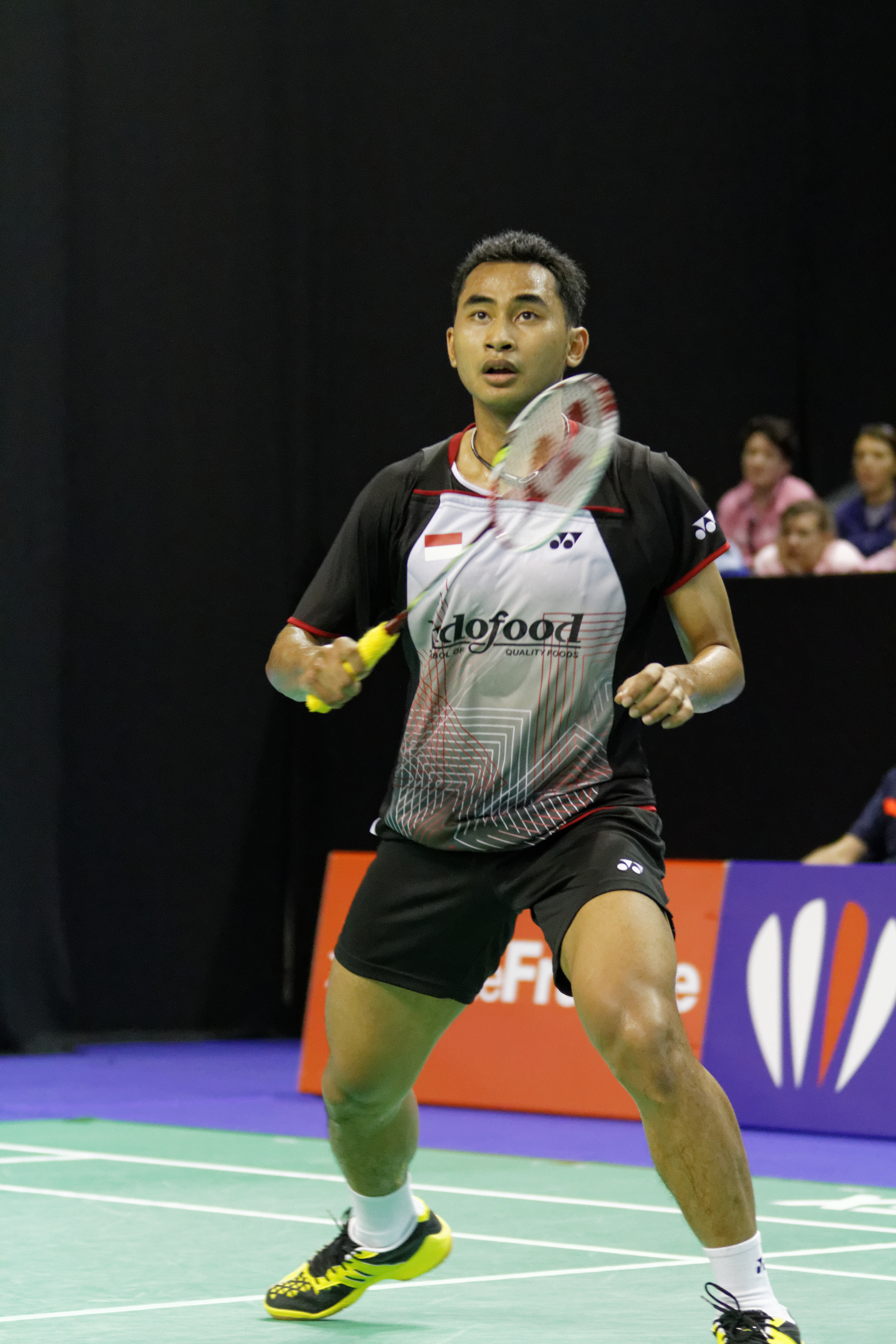
- Sugiarto at the 2013 French Open Superseries

Personal information
- Born: 31 May 1988 (age 38) Jakarta, Indonesia
- Height: 1.75 m (5 ft 9 in)
- Weight: 70 kg (154 lb)

Sport
- Country: Indonesia
- Sport: Badminton
- Handedness: Right

Men's singles
- Career record: 351 wins, 216 losses
- Highest ranking: 3 (10 April 2014)
- BWF profile
Medal record
Men's badminton
Representing Indonesia
World Championships
Bronze medal – third place	2014 Copenhagen	Men's singles
Thomas Cup
Silver medal – second place	2016 Kunshan	Men's team
Bronze medal – third place	2014 New Delhi	Men's team
Asia Team Championships
Gold medal – first place	2016 Hyderabad	Men's team
SEA Games
Gold medal – first place	2009 Vientiane	Men's team
Gold medal – first place	2011 Jakarta–Palembang	Men's team
Summer Universiade
Bronze medal – third place	2007 Bangkok	Mixed team
World Junior Championships
Silver medal – second place	2006 Incheon	Boys' singles
Bronze medal – third place	2004 Richmond	Mixed team

Tommy Sugiarto (born 31 May 1988) is an Indonesian badminton player who is a singles specialist. He was the bronze medalist at the 2014 World Championships. Sugiarto competed at the 2014 Asian Games and 2016 Summer Olympics.

== Personal life ==
Tommy Sugiarto is the son of the former badminton world champion Icuk Sugiarto. He has also a younger sister named Jauza Fadhila Sugiarto (born 1999) who is also a badminton player and represented Indonesia in the 2014 BWF World Junior Championships. He is of Indonesian Chinese descent. In December 2016, he married Annisa Nur Ramadhani.

== Career ==
=== 2023 ===
In January, Tommy Sugiarto played at the home tournament, Indonesia Masters, but had to lose in the first qualifying round from Danish player Victor Svendsen. In the next tournament, he lost in the first round of the Thailand Masters from fellow Indonesian player Christian Adinata in rubber games.

In June, Sugiarto competed at the Taipei Open, but lost in the second round from 3rd seed Indian player Prannoy H. S.

== Achievements ==
=== BWF World Championships ===
Men's singles
Year	Venue	Opponent	Score	Result	Ref.
2014	Ballerup Super Arena; Copenhagen, Denmark	(China) Chen Long	16–21, 20–22	Bronze	

=== World University Championships ===
Men's singles
Year	Venue	Opponent	Score	Result	Ref.
2010	Taipei Gymnasium; Taipei, Taiwan	(Chinese Taipei) Hsueh Hsuan-yi	21–18, 16–21, 14–21	Silver	

=== World Junior Championships ===
Boys' singles
Year	Venue	Opponent	Score	Result	Ref.
2006	Samsan World Gymnasium; Incheon, South Korea	(South Korea) Hong Ji-hoon	13–21, 21–10, 16–21	Silver	

=== BWF World Tour (1 title, 2 runners-up) ===
The BWF World Tour, which was announced on 19 March 2017 and implemented in 2018, is a series of elite badminton tournaments sanctioned by the Badminton World Federation (BWF). The BWF World Tour is divided into levels of World Tour Finals, Super 1000, Super 750, Super 500, Super 300 (part of the HSBC World Tour), and the BWF Tour Super 100.

Men's singles
Year	Tournament	Level	Opponent	Score	Result	Ref.
2018	Thailand Masters	Super 300	(Malaysia) Leong Jun Hao	21–16, 21–15	(gold) Winner	
2018	Thailand Open	Super 500	(Japan) Kanta Tsuneyama	16–21, 21–13, 9–21	(silver) Runner-up	
2018	Korea Open	Super 500	(Chinese Taipei) Chou Tien-chen	13–21, 16–21	(silver) Runner-up	

=== BWF Superseries (1 title, 3 runners-up) ===
The BWF Superseries, which was launched on 14 December 2006 and implemented in 2007, was a series of elite badminton tournaments, sanctioned by the Badminton World Federation (BWF). BWF Superseries levels were Superseries and Superseries Premier. A season of Superseries consisted of twelve tournaments around the world that had been introduced since 2011. Successful players were invited to the Superseries Finals, which were held at the end of each year.

Men's singles
Year	Tournament	Opponent	Score	Result	Ref.
2013	Singapore Open	(Thailand) Boonsak Ponsana	20–22, 21–5, 21–17	(gold) Winner	
2013	World Superseries Finals	(Malaysia) Lee Chong Wei	10–21, 12–21	(silver) Runner-up	
2014	Malaysia Open	(Malaysia) Lee Chong Wei	19–21, 9–21	(silver) Runner-up	
2015	Denmark Open	(China) Chen Long	12–21, 12–21	(silver) Runner-up	

BWF Super Series Finals tournament
BWF Super Series Premier tournament
BWF Super Series tournament

=== BWF Grand Prix (5 titles, 2 runners-up) ===
The BWF Grand Prix had two levels, the Grand Prix and Grand Prix Gold. It was a series of badminton tournaments sanctioned by the Badminton World Federation (BWF) and played between 2007 and 2017.

Men's singles
Year	Tournament	Opponent	Score	Result	Ref.
2011	Chinese Taipei Open	(Thailand) Tanongsak Saensomboonsuk	21–15, 15–21, 21–17	(gold) Winner	
2011	Indonesia Grand Prix Gold	(Indonesia) Dionysius Hayom Rumbaka	16–21, 17–21	(silver) Runner-up	
2013	German Open	(China) Chen Long	17–21, 11–21	(silver) Runner-up	
2015	Russian Open	(Estonia) Raul Must	21–16, 21–10	(gold) Winner	
2015	Vietnam Open	(South Korea) Lee Hyun-il	21–19, 21–19	(gold) Winner	
2015	Indonesian Masters	(India) Srikanth Kidambi	17–21, 21–13, 24–22	(gold) Winner	
2017	Thailand Masters	(Thailand) Kantaphon Wangcharoen	21–17, 21–11	(gold) Winner	

BWF Grand Prix Gold tournament
BWF Grand Prix tournament

=== BWF International Challenge/Satellite/Series (7 titles, 1 runner-up) ===
Men's singles
Year	Tournament	Opponent	Score	Result	Ref.
2006	Jakarta Satellite	(Japan) Shinya Ohtsuka	21–17, 21–14	(gold) Winner	
2006	Thailand Satellite	(Indonesia) Alamsyah Yunus	21–5, 21–11	(gold) Winner	
2010	India International	(Indonesia) Alamsyah Yunus	21–11, 13–21, 17–21	(silver) Runner-up	
2010	Lao International	(Russia) Stanislav Pukhov	21–19, 21–13	(gold) Winner	
2010	Malaysia International	(Malaysia) Mohamad Arif Abdul Latif	9–21, 21–10, 21–13	(gold) Winner	
2010	Bahrain International	(Netherlands) Eric Pang	21–17, 21–9	(gold) Winner	
2011	Iran Fajr International	(Singapore) Derek Wong	21–17, 18–21, 21–11	(gold) Winner	
2011	Indonesia International	(Indonesia) Alamsyah Yunus	21–15, 13–21, 21–15	(gold) Winner	

BWF International Challenge tournament
BWF International Series tournament

== Performance timeline ==
Key

W	Won	F	Finalist	SF	Semi-finalist
QF	Quarter-finalist	#R	Rounds 4, 3, 2, 1	RR	Round-robin stage
Q#	Qualification round	A	Absent	w/d	Withdrew
G	Gold	S	Silver	B	Bronze
NH	Not held	N/A	Not applicable	DNQ	Did not qualify

=== National team ===
- Junior level

Team event	2004	2005	2006
World Junior Championships	B	NH	4th

- Senior level

Team events	2007	2008	2009	2010	2011	2012	2013	2014	2015	2016
Summer Universiade	B	NH			A	NH	A	NH	A	NH
SEA Games	A	NH	G	NH	G	NH			A	NH
Asia Team Championships	NH									G
Thomas Cup	NH	A	NH	A	NH	A	NH	B	NH	S

=== Individual competitions ===
- Junior level

Event	2004	2005	2006	Ref
World Junior Championships	4R	NH	S	

- Senior level

Events	2008	2010	2011	2012	2013	2014	2015	2016	2017	2018	2019	2020	2021	2022	Ref
Asian Championships	2R	2R	A	w/d	A		w/d	QF	1R	A	2R	NH		A	
Asian Games	NH	A	NH			3R	NH			A	NH			A	
World Championships	A			NH	QF	B	2R	NH	2R	2R	2R	NH	w/d	1R	
Olympic Games	DNQ	NH		DNQ	NH			R16	NH			DNQ	NH		

Tournament	IBF Grand Prix	BWF Superseries / Grand Prix											BWF World Tour							Best	Ref
Tournament	2006	2007	2008	2009	2010	2011	2012	2013	2014	2015	2016	2017	2018	2019	2020	2021	2022	2023	2024	Best	Ref
Malaysia Open	A		Q1	A	1R	1R	2R	1R	F	w/o	1R	2R	SF	1R	NH		1R	A		F ('14)	
India Open	NH		A	SF	A		2R	1R	A	SF	QF	QF	2R	1R	NH		1R	A		SF ('09, '15)	
Indonesia Masters	NH				QF	F	QF	SF	A	W	A	NH	2R	A	2R	1R	1R	Q1	A	W ('15)	
Thailand Masters	NH										A	W	W	A		NH	NA	1R	Q1	W ('17, '18)	
German Open	A	2R	3R	A			SF	F	w/d	w/d	1R	A			NH		A			F ('13)	
French Open	A					1R	A	QF	SF	1R	A		1R	1R	NH	A				SF ('14)	
All England Open	A	Q1	2R	Q1	A		1R	QF	1R	1R	2R	1R	2R	QF	1R	A				QF ('13, '19)	
Swiss Open	A						2R	A		w/d	A			1R	NH	A				2R ('12)	
Thailand Open	A	QF	QF	A	NH	3R	w/d	1R	NH	w/d	A		F	2R	A	NH	2R	A		F ('18)	
Malaysia Masters	NH			A		3R	SF	w/d	A		SF	SF	1R	1R	1R	NH	1R	A		SF ('12, '16, '17)	
Singapore Open	1R	Q1	A			1R	2R	W	w/d	w/d	QF	1R	w/d	1R	NH		2R	A		W ('13)	
Indonesia Open	3R	1R	1R	Q1	A	1R	1R	SF	1R	2R	1R	1R	QF	1R	NH	1R	1R	A		SF ('13)	
Australian Open	A	IS		GP		SF	1R	A	SF	1R	w/d	1R	QF	QF	NH		1R	A		SF ('11, '14)	
Japan Open	A		2R	A		1R	A	1R	QF	SF	1R	2R	1R	QF	NH		A			SF ('15)	
Korea Open	A					1R	1R	1R	1R	2R	w/d	1R	F	A	NH		A			F ('18)	
Indonesia Masters Super 100	NH												A		NH		A	SF	A	SF ('23)	
Indonesia Masters Super 100	NH												A		NH		A	3R	A	SF ('23)	
Taipei Open	A		QF	QF	A	W	3R	A		2R	A			1R	NH		A	2R	A	W ('11)	
Vietnam Open	A			SF	QF	A				W	A				NH		2R	3R	A	W ('15)	
Hong Kong Open	A						SF	SF	1R	1R	A	2R	1R	A	NH			A		SF ('12, '13)	
China Open	A					1R	1R	2R	2R	1R	1R	A	1R	2R	NH			A		2R ('13, '14, '19)	
Macau Open	A	3R	QF	A		3R	1R	A							NH			NA	A	QF ('08)	
Malaysia Super 100	NH																	2R	A	2R ('23)	
Denmark Open	A					2R	w/d	2R	1R	F	A		2R	SF	A	SF	A			F ('15)	
Hylo Open	A									3R	A				NH	2R	A			3R ('15)	
Korea Masters	NH	IC			A	QF	A								NH		A			QF ('11)	
China Masters	A							1R	A				2R	1R	NH			A		2R ('18)	
Syed Modi International	NH			A	QF	3R	SF	NH	A		w/d	A			NH		A			SF ('12)	
Dutch Open	A	2R	A												NH	NA				2R ('07)	
New Zealand Open	A		QF	A	NH	IC	NH	A					QF	2R	NH			NA		QF ('08, '18)	
Philippines Open	A	2R	NH	2R	NA															2R ('07, '09)	
Russian Open	NH	QF	A							W	A				NH			NA		W ('15)	
Superseries / World Tour Finals	NH		DNQ					F	RR	DNQ			RR	DNQ						F ('13)	
Year-end ranking				90	38	17	22	4	9	11	21	25	9	21	26	28	63	85	492	3	
Tournament	2006	2007	2008	2009	2010	2011	2012	2013	2014	2015	2016	2017	2018	2019	2020	2021	2022	2023	2024	Best	Ref

== Record against selected opponents ==
Head to head (H2H) against World Superseries finalists, World Championships semifinalists, and Olympic quarterfinalists.

- (China) Chen Jin 0–5
- (China) Chen Long 1–12
- (China) Chen Yu 0–2
- (China) Lin Dan 2–6
- (China) Shi Yuqi 1–2
- (China) Tian Houwei 1–4
- (Denmark) Anders Antonsen 0–1
- (Denmark) Hans-Kristian Vittinghus 4–1
- (Denmark) Jan Ø. Jørgensen 1–3
- (Denmark) Peter Gade 0–3
- (Denmark) Viktor Axelsen 2–5
- (Indonesia) Anthony Ginting 3–3
- (Indonesia) Sony Dwi Kuncoro 2–3
- (Indonesia) Taufik Hidayat 1–2
- (India) Parupalli Kashyap 4–4
- (India) Sai Praneeth 2–3
- (India) Srikanth Kidambi 3–3
- (Japan) Kento Momota 3–9
- (Japan) Sho Sasaki 3–2
- (South Korea) Heo Kwang-hee 1–1
- (South Korea) Lee Hyun-il 3–3
- (South Korea) Son Wan-ho 2–7
- (Malaysia) Lee Chong Wei 0–17
- (Malaysia) Liew Daren 3–1
- (Malaysia) Wong Choong Hann 0–4
- (Thailand) Boonsak Ponsana 5–2
- (Chinese Taipei) Chou Tien-chen 5–5
- (Vietnam) Nguyễn Tiến Minh 1–6
