= Kantaphon Wangcharoen =

Thai badminton player (born 1998)

Personal information
- Born: 18 September 1998 (age 28) Bangkok, Thailand
- Height: 1.73 m (5 ft 8 in)

Sport
- Country: Thailand
- Sport: Badminton
- Handedness: Right

Men's singles
- Career record: 179 wins, 176 losses
- Highest ranking: 12 (22 October 2019)
- Current ranking: 61 (7 July 2026)
- BWF profile
Medal record
Men's badminton
Representing Thailand
World Championships
Bronze medal – third place	2019 Basel	Men's singles
Sudirman Cup
Bronze medal – third place	2019 Nanning	Mixed team
SEA Games
Bronze medal – third place	2017 Kuala Lumpur	Men's team
Bronze medal – third place	2019 Philippines	Men's singles
Bronze medal – third place	2019 Philippines	Men's team
Bronze medal – third place	2025 Thailand	Men's team
World Junior Championships
Bronze medal – third place	2014 Alor Setar	Mixed team
Bronze medal – third place	2016 Bilbao	Boys' singles
Bronze medal – third place	2016 Bilbao	Mixed team
Asia Junior Championships
Bronze medal – third place	2016 Bangkok	Mixed team

Kantaphon Wangcharoen (Thai: กันตภณ หวังเจริญ; born 18 September 1998) is a Thai badminton player. At the young age, Wangcharoen became the runner-up in the senior tournament 2014 Singapore International in the men's singles event after losing the match because of foot injury. Wangcharoen clinched the bronze medal at the World Junior Championships in the boys' singles event, also part of the junior team that won the mixed team bronze in 2014 and 2016, and Asian mixed team bronze in 2016.

Wangcharoen was a member of the Thailand national team that won the bronze medals at the 2017, 2019 SEA Games and 2019 Sudirman Cup. He also the finalist at the BWF Grand Prix Gold event 2017 Thailand Masters, and won the 2017 National Championships title.

At the 2018 Asian Games in Indonesia, Wangcharoen was criticized by the Thai media after he mocked and made fun of Indonesian fans in front of them by using offensive Thai language. He had recorded and published the offensive video clip on his personal Instagram account himself.

He ended the 2018 BWF season by qualified to compete at the World Tour Finals and catapulted him to a career-best world ranking of no. 15 at that year. He won the bronze medal at the 2019 BWF World Championships, becoming the first ever Thai player to win a World Championships medal in the men's singles event.

== Achievements ==
=== BWF World Championships ===
Men's singles
Year	Venue	Opponent	Score	Result
2019	St. Jakobshalle; Basel, Switzerland	(Denmark) Anders Antonsen	15–21, 10–21	Bronze

=== SEA Games ===
Men's singles
Year	Venue	Opponent	Score	Result
2019	Muntinlupa Sports Complex, Metro Manila, Philippines	(Singapore) Loh Kean Yew	21–16, 6–21, 9–21	Bronze

=== BWF World Junior Championships ===
Boys' singles
Year	Venue	Opponent	Score	Result
2016	Bilbao Arena; Bilbao, Spain	(China) Sun Feixiang	9–21, 13–21	Bronze

=== BWF World Tour (1 runner-up) ===
The BWF World Tour, which was announced on 19 March 2017 and implemented in 2018, is a series of elite badminton tournaments sanctioned by the Badminton World Federation (BWF). The BWF World Tour is divided into levels of World Tour Finals, Super 1000, Super 750, Super 500, Super 300, and the BWF Tour Super 100.

Men's singles
Year	Tournament	Level	Opponent	Score	Result	Ref.
2026	Macau Open	Super 300	(China) Hu Zhe'an	21–11, 10–21, 13–21	(silver) Runner-up	

=== BWF Grand Prix (1 runner-up) ===
The BWF Grand Prix had two levels, the Grand Prix and Grand Prix Gold. It was a series of badminton tournaments sanctioned by the Badminton World Federation (BWF) and played between 2007 and 2017.

Men's singles
Year	Tournament	Opponent	Score	Result
2017	Thailand Masters	(Indonesia) Tommy Sugiarto	17–21, 11–21	(silver) Runner-up

BWF Grand Prix Gold tournament

=== BWF International Challenge/Series (1 runner-up) ===
Men's singles
Year	Tournament	Opponent	Score	Result
2014	Singapore International	(Singapore) Loh Kean Yew	21–19, 14–21, 1–11 retired	(silver) Runner-up

BWF International Challenge tournament
BWF International Series tournament
BWF Future Series tournament

== Record against selected opponents ==
Record against Year-end Finals finalists, World Championships semi-finalists, and Olympic quarter-finalists. Accurate as of 22 December 2022.

Player	Matches	Win	Lost	Diff.
(China) Chen Long	4	1	3	–2
(China) Lin Dan	3	1	2	–1
(China) Shi Yuqi	5	0	5	–5
(China) Zhao Junpeng	2	1	1	0
(Chinese Taipei) Chou Tien-chen	7	1	6	–5
(Denmark) Anders Antonsen	3	0	3	–3
(Denmark) Viktor Axelsen	2	0	2	–2
(Denmark) Jan Ø. Jørgensen	1	0	1	–1
(Denmark) Hans-Kristian Vittinghus	4	2	2	0
(England) Rajiv Ouseph	2	2	0	+2
(India) Parupalli Kashyap	1	1	0	+1
(India) Srikanth Kidambi	3	1	2	–1

Player	Matches	Win	Lost	Diff.
(India) B. Sai Praneeth	7	3	4	–1
(India) Lakshya Sen	5	1	4	–3
(Indonesia) Anthony Sinisuka Ginting	7	3	4	–1
(Indonesia) Tommy Sugiarto	5	0	5	–5
(Japan) Kento Momota	3	0	3	–3
(Malaysia) Lee Chong Wei	1	0	1	–1
(Malaysia) Liew Daren	2	2	0	+2
(Singapore) Loh Kean Yew	3	0	3	–3
(South Korea) Heo Kwang-hee	3	2	1	+1
(South Korea) Lee Hyun-il	2	1	1	0
(South Korea) Son Wan-ho	3	0	3	–3
(Thailand) Kunlavut Vitidsarn	3	2	1	+1
