= 2012 Asian Junior Badminton Championships – Boys singles =

Tournament details
- Dates: 3 – 7 July 2012
- Edition: 15
- Venue: Gimcheon Indoor Stadium
- Location: Gimcheon, South Korea

The boys' singles tournament of the 2012 Asian Junior Badminton Championships was held from July 3–7 in Gimcheon, South Korea. The defending champion of the last edition was Zulfadli Zulkiffli from Malaysia. The top seeded Sameer Verma of India had lost in the semifinals to third seeded Kento Momota of Japan, while the second seeded Shesar Hiren Rhustavito from Indonesia, lost to Yuki Kaneko of Japan in fourth round. Momota finally emerged as the champion after beat Malaysian player Soong Joo Ven in the finals with the score 21–13, 22–20.

== Seeded ==
1. (India) Sameer Verma (semi-finals)
2. (Indonesia) Shesar Hiren Rhustavito (fourth round)
3. (Japan) Kento Momota (champion)
4. (Thailand) Thammasin Sitthikom (second round)
5. (Thailand) Khosit Phetpradab (quarter-finals)
6. (Malaysia) Soong Joo Ven (finals)
7. (India) C. Rohit Yadav (fourth round)
8. (Indonesia) Arief Gifar Ramadhan (third round)
9. (Hong Kong) Ng Ka Long (quarter-finals)
10. (Chinese Taipei) Wang Tzu-wei (quarter-finals)
11. (Indonesia) Panji Akbar Sudrajat (semi-finals)
12. (India) Pratul Joshi (second round)
13. (Malaysia) Tan Kian Meng (second round)
14. (Thailand) Nonpakorn Nantatheero (fourth round)
15. (South Korea) Heo Kwang-hee (third round)
16. (South Korea) Jung Jae-wook (second round)

== Draw ==
=== Finals ===
Quarterfinals
1	(India) Sameer Verma	21	21
9	(Hong Kong) Ng Ka Long	5	19
3	(Japan) Kento Momota	21	21
5	(Thailand) Khosit Phetpradab	16	12
10	(Chinese Taipei) Wang Tzu-wei	13	18
11	(Indonesia) Panji Ahmad Sudrajat	21	21
6	(Malaysia) Soong Joo Ven	16	21	21
(Japan) Yuki Kaneko	21	18	15

Semifinals
1	(India) Sameer Verma	21	18	9
3	(Japan) Kento Momota	13	21	21
11	(Indonesia) Panji Akbar Sudrajat	21	18	11
6	(Malaysia) Soong Joo Ven	13	21	21

Final
3	(Japan) Kento Momota	21	22
6	(Malaysia) Soong Joo Ven	13	20

=== Top Half ===
==== Section 1 ====
First round

Second round
1	(India) S Verma	21	21
(South Korea) Jang H-s	19	14
(Chinese Taipei) Yang S-j	21	21
(Vietnam) Do T D	12	10
13	(Malaysia) Tan K M	16	12
(China) Guo K	21	21
(Singapore) S Lee	21	14	19
(Iran) F Khanjani	17	21	21

Third round
1	(India) S Verma	21	21
(Chinese Taipei) Yang S-j	19	15
(China) Guo K	21	21
(Iran) F Khanjani	5	8

Fourth round
1	(India) S Verma	21	12	21
(China) Guo K	13	21	13

==== Section 2 ====
First round

Second round
8	(Indonesia) A G Ramadhan	21	21
(Uzbekistan) S Chugunov	5	5
(Japan) Y Kobayashi	21	21
(Sri Lanka) D B Yatawara	14	11
9	(Hong Kong) Ng K L	21	21
(Mongolia) E Purevsuren	9	4
(Thailand) T Thawornwong	21	16	21
(Bangladesh) M A Hossain	2	21	7

Third round
8	(Indonesia) A G Ramadhan	15	21	19
(Japan) Y Kobayashi	21	15	21
9	(Hong Kong) Ng K L	21	21
(Thailand) T Thawornwong	12	7

Fourth round
(Japan) Y Kobayashi	14	13
9	(Hong Kong) Ng K L	21	21

==== Section 3 ====
First round

Second round
3	(Japan) K Momota	21	21
(Kazakhstan) K Kulmatov	3	9
(Chinese Taipei) Lan W-h	11	13
(Indonesia) F I Hadmadi	21	21
15	(South Korea) Heo K-h	21	21
(Turkmenistan) A Nyyazgulyyev	2	2
(Hong Kong) Lee C Y	21	21
(Vietnam) Pham H N	14	11

Third round
3	(Japan) K Momota	21	21
(Indonesia) F I Hadmadi	14	13
15	(South Korea) Heo K-h	19	21	18
(Hong Kong) Lee C Y	21	18	21

Fourth round
3	(Japan) K Momota	21	21
(Hong Kong) Lee C Y	16	17

==== Section 4 ====
First round

Second round
5	(Thailand) K Phetpradab	23	21
(South Korea) Kim D-h	21	19
(Uzbekistan) B Appakhodjaev	15	12
(Macau) Lei I M	21	21
12	(India) P Joshi	21	18	19
(Malaysia) Cheam J W	18	21	21
(Sri Lanka) M Vibhavi	21	16	8
(Singapore) B Ong	14	21	21

Third round
5	(Thailand) K Phetpradab	21	21
(Macau) Lei I M	6	8
(Malaysia) Cheam J W	21	21
(Singapore) B Ong	11	15

Fourth round
5	(Thailand) K Phetpradab	21	21
(Malaysia) Cheam J W	9	11

=== Bottom Half ===
==== Section 5 ====
First round
(Malaysia) Chong Y H	13	19
(South Korea) Jeon H-j	21	21

Second round
(South Korea) Jeon H-j	21	21
(Turkmenistan) P Sopyyev	0	5
(Sri Lanka) P K Hettiarachchi	6	12
10	(Chinese Taipei) Wang T-w	21	21
(Bangladesh) A bin Jaman	4	6
(China) Shi YQ	21	21
(Macau) Lou H M	8	10
7	(India) R Yadav	21	21

Third round
(South Korea) Jeon H-j	20	20
10	(Chinese Taipei) Wang T-w	22	22
(China) Shi YQ	18	21	15
7	(India) R Yadav	21	19	21

Fourth round
10	(Chinese Taipei) Wang T-w	21	21
7	(India) R Yadav	17	13

==== Section 6 ====
First round

Second round
(Singapore) L Teng	21	21
(Iran) M Shahbazi	12	13
(Mongolia) B Munkhbat	4	5
11	(Indonesia) P A Sudrajat	21	21
(Vietnam) Ngo X T	17	13
(Hong Kong) Chang T C	21	21
(Japan) K Nishimoto	24	21
4	(Thailand) T Sitthikom	22	14

Third round
(Singapore) L Teng	16	13
11	(Indonesia) P A Sudrajat	21	21
(Hong Kong) Chang T C	15	12
(Japan) K Nishimoto	21	21

Fourth round
11	(Indonesia) P A Sudrajat	21	21
(Japan) K Nishimoto	16	19

==== Section 7 ====
First round

Second round
(Uzbekistan) A Savatyugin	21	21
(Sri Lanka) M De Silva	10	14
(Vietnam) Pham C C	14	19
14	(Thailand) N Nantatheero	21	21
(Hong Kong) Tang C M	18	13
(South Korea) Kim D-j	21	21
(Nepal) D Dhami	11	14
6	(Malaysia) Soong J V	21	21

Third round
(Uzbekistan) A Savatyugin	8	15
14	(Thailand) N Nantatheero	21	21
(South Korea) Kim D-j	21	13	18
6	(Malaysia) Soong J V	9	21	21

Fourth round
14	(Thailand) N Nantatheero	14	20
6	(Malaysia) Soong J V	21	22

==== Section 8 ====
First round

Second round
(Japan) Y Kaneko	21	21
(India) A Yelegar	16	13
(China) Xue S	21	21
16	(South Korea) Jung J-w	15	16
(Iran) S Sadeghi	18	21	8
(Chinese Taipei) Hung C-c	21	19	21
(Singapore) M A bin Ishak	11	14
2	(Indonesia) S H Rhustavito	21	21

Third round
(Japan) Y Kaneko	21	11	21
(China) Xue S	16	21	12
(Chinese Taipei) Hung C-c	9	11
2	(Indonesia) S H Rhustavito	21	21

Fourth round
(Japan) Y Kaneko	21	21
2	(Indonesia) S H Rhustavito	19	18
