= 2019 BWF World Championships =

2019 Badminton tournament in Switzerland

Tournament details
- Dates: 19–25 August
- Edition: 25th
- Level: International
- Competitors: 359 from 45 nations
- Venue: St. Jakobshalle
- Location: Basel, Switzerland
- Official website: basel2019.org

The 2019 BWF World Championships was a badminton tournament which was held from 19 to 25 August 2019 at St. Jakobshalle in Basel, Switzerland.

== Host city selection ==
Basel was chosen to be the host of the 2019 edition of the championships over 2020 Summer Olympics host city, Tokyo. The bid were approved by the Badminton World Federation during a council meeting in Kuala Lumpur, Malaysia.

== Schedule ==
Five events were held.

All times are local (UTC+2).

R64	Round of 64	R48	Round of 48	R32	Round of 32	1/8	Round of 16	1/4	Quarter-finals	1/2	Semi-finals	F	Final

Date	Mon 19	Tue 20		Wed 21	Thu 22	Fri 23	Sat 24	Sun 25
Event	Mon 19	Tue 20		Wed 21	Thu 22	Fri 23	Sat 24	Sun 25
Men's singles	R64	R32		R32	1/8	1/4	1/2	F
Women's singles	R48	R48	R32	R32	1/8	1/4	1/2	F
Men's doubles	R48	R48		R32	1/8	1/4	1/2	F
Women's doubles	R48	R48		R32	1/8	1/4	1/2	F
Mixed doubles	R48	R48	R32	R32	1/8	1/4	1/2	F
Matches	64	56		56	40	20	10	5
Courts	4	4		4	4	2	1	1
Sessions	1	1		1	1	2	2	1
Time	09–23	09–22		09-22	11–22	11–16	11–16	12–17
Time	09–23	09–22		09-22	11–22	17–22	17–22	12–17

== Medal summary ==
=== Medal table ===
* Host nation (Switzerland)

Rank	Nation	Gold	Silver	Bronze	Total
1	Japan (JPN)	2	3	1	6
2	China (CHN)	1	0	4	5
3	Indonesia (INA)	1	0	2	3
4	India (IND)	1	0	1	2
5	Thailand (THA)	0	1	2	3
6	Denmark (DEN)	0	1	0	1
Totals (6 entries)		5	5	10	20

=== Medalists ===
Event	Gold	Silver	Bronze
Men's singles	Kento Momota; Japan	Anders Antonsen; Denmark	B. Sai Praneeth; India
Men's singles	Kento Momota; Japan	Anders Antonsen; Denmark	Kantaphon Wangcharoen; Thailand
Women's singles	P. V. Sindhu; India	Nozomi Okuhara; Japan	Ratchanok Intanon; Thailand
Women's singles	P. V. Sindhu; India	Nozomi Okuhara; Japan	Chen Yufei; China
Men's doubles	Indonesia; Mohammad Ahsan; Hendra Setiawan	Japan; Takuro Hoki; Yugo Kobayashi	Indonesia; Fajar Alfian; Muhammad Rian Ardianto
Men's doubles	Indonesia; Mohammad Ahsan; Hendra Setiawan	Japan; Takuro Hoki; Yugo Kobayashi	China; Li Junhui; Liu Yuchen
Women's doubles	Japan; Mayu Matsumoto; Wakana Nagahara	Japan; Yuki Fukushima; Sayaka Hirota	Indonesia; Greysia Polii; Apriyani Rahayu
Women's doubles	Japan; Mayu Matsumoto; Wakana Nagahara	Japan; Yuki Fukushima; Sayaka Hirota	China; Du Yue; Li Yinhui
Mixed doubles	China; Zheng Siwei; Huang Yaqiong	Thailand; Dechapol Puavaranukroh; Sapsiree Taerattanachai	Japan; Yuta Watanabe; Arisa Higashino
Mixed doubles	China; Zheng Siwei; Huang Yaqiong	Thailand; Dechapol Puavaranukroh; Sapsiree Taerattanachai	China; Wang Yilyu; Huang Dongping

== Players ==
=== Number of participants ===
Nation		MS	WS	MD	WD	XD	Total	Players
Africa	Mauritius	1					1	1
Asia	China	4	4	4	4	4	20	30
Asia	Chinese Taipei	2	2	4	2	1	11	17
Asia	Hong Kong	2	2	2	2	2	10	14
Asia	India	4	2	4	3	2	15	21
Asia	Indonesia	3	2	4	3	4	16	27
Asia	Japan	3	4	4	4	4	19	27
Asia	Jordan					1	1	2
Asia	Malaysia	2	1	4	2	3	12	21
Asia	Singapore	1	1	1		1	4	6
Asia	South Korea	2	3	1	2	1	9	12
Asia	Sri Lanka	1					1	1
Asia	Thailand	2	4	1	3	2	12	17
Asia	Vietnam	2	2			1	5	6
Europe	Austria	1		1			2	3
Europe	Belgium	1	1				2	2
Europe	Bulgaria		2		1	1	4	6
Europe	Croatia	1					1	1
Europe	Czech Republic	2		1	1	1	5	7
Europe	Denmark	3	2	1	2	1	9	12
Europe	England	2	1	2	1	3	9	11
Europe	Estonia	1	1		1		3	4
Europe	Finland	2					2	2
Europe	France	2		1	2	1	6	8
Europe	Germany	1	2	2	2	2	9	11
Europe	Hungary	1					1	1
Europe	Ireland	1		1		1	3	5
Europe	Israel	1	1			1	3	3
Europe	Italy	1					1	1
Europe	Netherlands	1	1	1	1.5	1	5.5	7
Europe	Poland	1				1	2	3
Europe	Russia	2	1	3	2	2	10	15
Europe	Scotland		1	1		1	3	4
Europe	Spain	2					2	2
Europe	Sweden	1			1		2	3
Europe	Switzerland (H)	1	1	1	0.5	1	4.5	6
Europe	Turkey	1	2		1		4	5
Europe	Ukraine	1			1	1	3	4
Oceania	Australia	1	1	1	1	1	5	6
Pan Am	Brazil	1					1	1
Pan Am	Canada	1	2	2	1	2	8	8
Pan Am	Guatemala	1			1		2	3
Pan Am	Mexico	1					1	1
Pan Am	Peru				1		1	2
Pan Am	United States		2	1	2	1	6	9
Total (45 NOCs)		64	48	48	48	48	256	359

=== Players participating in two events ===
Player	MS	WS	MD	WD	XD
(Australia) Gronya Somerville				check	check
(Australia) Simon Leung			check		check
(Bulgaria) Mariya Mitsova		check			check
(Canada) Jason Ho-shue	check		check		
(Canada) Joshua Hurlburt-Yu			check		check
(Canada) Kristen Tsai				check	check
(Canada) Nyl Yakura			check		check
(Canada) Rachel Honderich		check		check	
(China) Du Yue				check	check
(China) He Jiting			check		check
(Czech Republic) Alžběta Bášová				check	check
(Denmark) Sara Thygesen				check	check
(England) Ben Lane			check		check
(England) Chloe Birch		check		check	
(England) Lauren Smith				check	check
(England) Marcus Ellis			check		check
(France) Delphine Delrue				check	check
(France) Thom Gicquel			check		check
(Germany) Isabel Herttrich				check	check
(Germany) Linda Efler				check	check
(Germany) Mark Lamsfuß			check		check
(Germany) Marvin Emil Seidel			check		check
(Hong Kong) Chang Tak Ching			check		check
(Hong Kong) Ng Wing Yung				check	check
(India) Ashwini Ponnappa				check	check
(India) N. Sikki Reddy				check	check
(India) Satwiksairaj Rankireddy			check		check
(Israel) Misha Zilberman	check				check
(Japan) Takuro Hoki			check		check
(Japan) Misaki Matsutomo				check	check
(Japan) Wakana Nagahara				check	check
(Japan) Yuki Kaneko			check		check
(Japan) Yuta Watanabe			check		check
(Netherlands) Robin Tabeling			check		check
(Netherlands) Selena Piek				check	check
(Russia) Alina Davletova				check	check
(Scotland) Adam Hall			check		check
(South Korea) Seo Seung-jae			check		check
(Switzerland) Oliver Schaller			check		check
(Thailand) Sapsiree Taerattanachai				check	check
(Chinese Taipei) Wang Chi-lin			check		check
(Ukraine) Yelyzaveta Zharka				check	check
(United States) Isabel Zhong				check	check

== Performance by nation ==
Nation	First Round	Second Round	Third Round	Quarter-finals	Semi-finals	Final	Winner
Japan	9	18	13	9	6	5	2
China	5	19	14	9	5	1	1
Indonesia	8	14	9	4	3	1	1
India	10	9	5	2	2	1	1
Thailand	8	10	5	3	3	1	
Denmark	5	7	5	2	1	1	
South Korea	5	9	6	3			
Chinese Taipei	7	9	4	3			
Malaysia	5	11	6	2			
Hong Kong	9	4	2	1			
Singapore	4	2	2	1			
Netherlands	5.5	4	1	1			
England	7	5	2				
Germany	8	3	1				
Canada	7	3	1				
United States	5	2	1				
Vietnam	5	2	1				
Bulgaria	3	2	1				
Scotland	3	1	1				
Russia	10	7					
France	5	4					
Australia	5	3					
Ukraine	3	3					
Sweden	2	2					
Czech Republic	5	1					
Israel	3	1					
Belgium	2	1					
Spain	2	1					
Croatia	1	1					
Mexico	1	1					
Switzerland	4.5						
Turkey	4						
Estonia	3						
Ireland	3						
Austria	2						
Finland	2						
Poland	2						
Brazil	1						
Guatemala	1						
Hungary	1						
Italy	1						
Jordan	1						
Mauritius	1						
Peru	1						
Sri Lanka	1						
Withdrew	6	1					
Total	192	160	80	40	20	10	5

== See also ==
- 2019 BWF Para-Badminton World Championships, also hosted in Basel.
