= Kento Momota =

Japanese badminton player (born 1994)

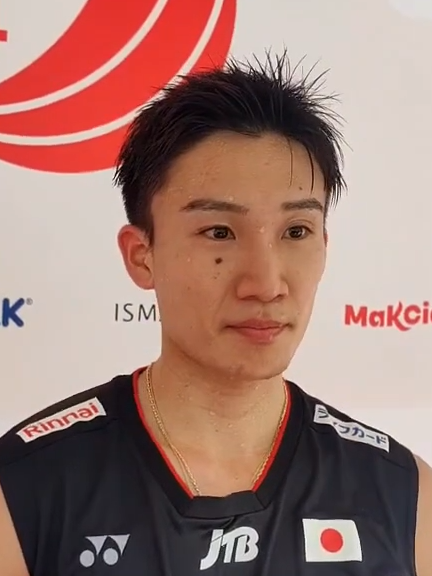
- Momota in 2024

Personal information
- Born: 1 September 1994 (age 32) Mino, Kagawa, Japan
- Height: 1.75 m (5 ft 9 in)
- Weight: 68 kg (150 lb)

Sport
- Country: Japan
- Sport: Badminton
- Handedness: Left
- Coached by: Yousuke Nakanishi
- Retired: 6 May 2024

Men's singles
- Career record: 388 wins, 111 losses
- Highest ranking: 1 (27 September 2018)
- BWF profile
Medal record
Men's badminton
Representing Japan
World Championships
Gold medal – first place	2018 Nanjing	Men's singles
Gold medal – first place	2019 Basel	Men's singles
Bronze medal – third place	2015 Jakarta	Men's singles
Sudirman Cup
Silver medal – second place	2015 Dongguan	Mixed team
Silver medal – second place	2019 Nanning	Mixed team
Silver medal – second place	2021 Vantaa	Mixed team
Thomas Cup
Gold medal – first place	2014 New Delhi	Men's team
Silver medal – second place	2018 Bangkok	Men's team
Bronze medal – third place	2020 Aarhus	Men's team
Bronze medal – third place	2022 Bangkok	Men's team
Asian Games
Bronze medal – third place	2018 Jakarta–Palembang	Men's team
Asian Championships
Gold medal – first place	2018 Wuhan	Men's singles
Gold medal – first place	2019 Wuhan	Men's singles
Asia Team Championships
Silver medal – second place	2016 Hyderabad	Men's team
Bronze medal – third place	2024 Selangor	Men's team
World Junior Championships
Gold medal – first place	2012 Chiba	Boys' singles
Silver medal – second place	2012 Chiba	Mixed team
Bronze medal – third place	2011 Taipei	Boys' singles
Asian Junior Championships
Gold medal – first place	2012 Gimcheon	Boys' singles
Gold medal – first place	2012 Gimcheon	Mixed team
Bronze medal – third place	2011 Lucknow	Boys' singles

Signature
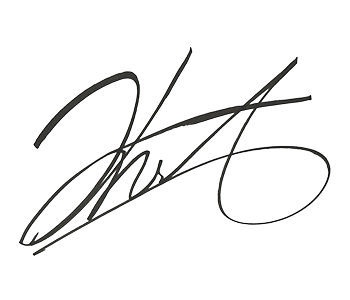

Kento Momota (桃田 賢斗, Momota Kento; born 1 September 1994) is a Japanese badminton player who retired from international competition in 2024. Known for his defensive consistency, court coverage, and shot precision, he won consecutive men's singles titles at the World Championships in 2018 and 2019, as well as two Asian Championships titles and the All England Open. In September 2018, he became the first Japanese man to reach the BWF world No. 1 singles ranking, holding the top spot for 121 weeks.

A World Junior Champion in 2012, Momota played an unbeaten role in Japan's maiden Thomas Cup victory in 2014. In 2015, he captured his first Superseries titles and earned Japan's first World Championships men's singles medal with a bronze in Jakarta. His career was halted in April 2016 when the Nippon Badminton Association suspended him indefinitely for visiting illegal casinos, ruling him out of the 2016 Summer Olympics. Reinstated in 2017, he mounted a rapid comeback that peaked in 2019, when he won a Guinness World Record 11 international titles in a single season and was named BWF Male Player of the Year.

In January 2020, Momota was injured in a fatal traffic collision in Malaysia and required surgery for a fractured eye socket. Returning to competition in December 2020, he competed as the top seed at the postponed 2020 Summer Olympics in Tokyo, where he was eliminated in the group stage. Following recurring injuries and a prolonged drop in form, punctuated by titles at the 2021 Indonesia Masters and 2023 Korea Masters, he announced his retirement from international badminton in April 2024, making his final international appearance at the 2024 Thomas Cup. He has since remained active in domestic Japanese competition, coaching, and invitational tournaments.

== Early life and career ==
Kento Momota was born on 1 September 1994, in Mino, Kagawa, Japan, to Nobuhiro and Michiyo Momota. His parents named him "Kento" after Clark Kent, the alter ego of Superman, hoping he would become the strongest person in the world. He began playing badminton at the age of seven, influenced by his older sister, Meiko. Although his parents were not experienced in the sport, his father, Nobuhiro, studied badminton and built a homemade practice court to support his son's development.

After winning the All Japan Elementary School Badminton Championship in 2007, Momota relocated to Fukushima Prefecture to attend Tomioka Daiichi Junior High School, which ran an established badminton programme. He won the National Junior High School Badminton Tournament in August 2009 and became the first junior high school student to reach the semifinals of the All Japan Junior Championships, a tournament that included high school players. He subsequently enrolled at Tomioka High School, where he trained under coaches including former Indonesian player Imam Tohari.

== Career ==
=== 2011–2013 ===
Momota first gained international attention in 2011 boys' singles bronze medals at both the Asian Junior Championships in Lucknow and the World Junior Championships in Taipei. Concurrently, he made his senior BWF Super Series debut at the Japan Open. Domestically, he reached the quarterfinals of the All Japan Championships, where he was defeated by Kenichi Tago.

Momota concluded his junior career in 2012 by winning gold medals in boys' singles and the mixed team event at the Asian Junior Championships in Gimcheon. Later that year at the World Junior Championships in Chiba, he became the first Japanese player to win the boys' singles world junior title. He also contributed to Japan's mixed team silver medal. On the senior circuit, he reached the third round on his Asian Championships debut and finished the year ranked world No. 90.

Upon graduating from high school in 2013, Momota joined the NTT East badminton team. He won three consecutive BWF International Challenge tournaments in Europe early in the year: the Estonian International, the Swedish International, and the Austrian International. He reached his first Super Series Premier semifinal at the China Open in November, and ended the season ranked world No. 17.

=== 2014–2016 ===
In May 2014, Momota was part of the Japanese squad that won the nation's maiden Thomas Cup title in New Delhi. He won all five of his matches during the tournament, including singles victories against Du Pengyu in the semifinals and Chong Wei Feng in the final. Individually, he advanced to the semifinals of the French Open. In August, he made his World Championships debut in Copenhagen but exited in the first round. The following month, at the Asian Games in Incheon, he advanced to the third round of the men's singles losing to Chen Long. He qualified for the season-ending BWF Super Series Finals in Dubai, where he was eliminated in the round-robin stage.

Momota achieved several milestones in 2015. In April, he won the Singapore Open to become the first Japanese man to claim a Superseries singles title, and followed it two months later with his maiden Superseries Premier title at the Indonesia Open. After helping Japan finish as runners-up at the Sudirman Cup, he became the first Japanese man to win a medal at the World Championships, securing a bronze in Jakarta after a semifinal defeat to Chen Long. He concluded the season by winning the 2015 BWF Super Series Finals against Viktor Axelsen, rising to a career-high world No. 3.

He began 2016 with a team silver at the Asia Team Championships and a singles title at the India Open title in April. Days later, on 7 April 2016, Momota admitted to having visited illegal casinos in Tokyo alongside teammate Kenichi Tago. The Nippon Badminton Association responded with an indefinite suspension, removing him from contention for the 2016 Summer Olympics in Rio de Janeiro. The suspension also led to his removal from the BWF world rankings, where he had previously held the No. 2 position.

=== 2017–2018 ===
After his suspension was lifted in May 2017, Momota returned on the lower-tier international circuit to rebuild his ranking. Between July and October, he won five consecutive tournaments: the Yonex / K&D Graphics International, the Belgian International, the Czech Open, the Dutch Open Grand Prix, and the Macau Open Grand Prix Gold. He also finished as runner-up at the Canada Open. His performances earned him a reinstatement to the Japanese national team at the end of the year.

In April, Momota won the Asian Championships in Wuhan, defeating Olympic champion Chen Long in the final. He followed this with a silver medal with the Japanese team at the Thomas Cup and an individual title at the Indonesia Open. On 5 August, Momota won the World Championships in Nanjing, defeating Shi Yuqi in the final to become Japan's first men's singles world champion. After further tournament victories at the Japan Open, Denmark Open, and Fuzhou China Open, Momota attained the BWF world No. 1 ranking on 27 September 2018, becoming the first Japanese man to top the singles world rankings.

=== 2019 ===
Momota won a record 11 titles during the 2019 season. In March, he won the German Open and became the first Japanese man to capture the All England Open, defeating Viktor Axelsen in the final. He subsequently won the Singapore Open in April before retaining his Asian Championships title against Shi Yuqi later that month, followed by the Japan Open in July.

In August, Momota defended his title at the World Championships in Basel, defeating Anders Antonsen 21–9, 21–3 in the final to become the fourth men's singles player to win consecutive world titles, after Yang Yang, Lin Dan and Chen Long. Later in the year, he secured titles at the China Open, Korea Open, Denmark Open, and Fuzhou China Open. In December, Momota capped his season by winning the World Tour Finals against Anthony Sinisuka Ginting. His 11 titles set a Guinness World Record for the most badminton men's singles titles in a season, and he was named BWF Male Player of the Year.

=== 2020–2021 ===
Momota opened 2020 season by winning the Malaysia Masters, defeating Viktor Axelsen in the final. Hours after the victory, on 13 January, the vehicle transporting him to Kuala Lumpur International Airport collided with a truck, killing the driver and injuring Momota and three other passengers. After returning to Japan, he experienced double vision during training and underwent surgery on 8 February for a right orbital floor fracture, with an estimated recovery period of three months. The BWF subsequently suspended international tournaments due to the COVID-19 pandemic. Momota returned to competition in December 2020, winning his third consecutive All Japan national title.

In January 2021, Momota tested positive for COVID-19, prompting the Japanese national team to withdraw from three tournaments in Thailand. In February, Momota became the first badminton player to be nominated for a Laureus World Sports Award, receiving a nomination for the 2021 World Comeback of the Year following his return to competition after the 2020 road accident. He returned to international competition in March at the All England Open, reaching the quarterfinals. Competing as the top seed on home soil at the postponed 2020 Summer Olympics in Tokyo, Momota lost to South Korea's Heo Kwang-hee in the group stage, failing to advance to the knockout rounds.

Later in the year, he helped Japan secure silver at the Sudirman Cup in Vantaa and bronze at the Thomas Cup in Aarhus. He also reached the final of the Denmark Open, where he lost to Axelsen. At the French Open later that month, Momota retired due to a back injury during the deciding game of his semifinal against compatriot Kanta Tsuneyama. In November, he claimed his first title since his 2020 accident by defeating Anders Antonsen at the Indonesia Masters. However, recurring back problems forced him to retire from his opening match at the World Tour Finals in December and subsequently withdraw from the World Championships in Huelva, where he was the defending champion.

=== 2022–2024 ===
Momota experienced inconsistent form throughout the 2022 season, recording early-round exits at several tournaments, including the Asian Championships, World Championships, and the Indonesia Open. His strongest result came at the Malaysia Open, where he reached the final before losing to Viktor Axelsen.

In 2023, he reached the semifinals of the German Open in March before ending a two-year title drought in November at the Korea Masters, defeating compatriot Koki Watanabe in the final.

Following a team bronze at the 2024 Asia Team Championships, Momota announced his retirement from international badminton on 18 April 2024 at the age of 29, citing physical and mental limitations in his efforts to regain his former level following the 2020 traffic accident. He made his final international appearance at the 2024 Thomas Cup in Chengdu, winning all three of his group-stage matches before Japan was eliminated 1–3 by Malaysia in the quarterfinals without Momota taking the court.

== Post-retirement activities ==
Following his retirement from international competition in 2024, Momota remained with the NTT East badminton team and continued to compete in domestic tournaments. He later helped coach younger teammates, including Riki Takei and Yushi Tanaka. He also became involved in youth development initiatives, organising badminton clinics for children to promote the sport, including the Kento Momota Kids Badminton Challenge held in his home prefecture of Kagawa in July 2024. In 2026, Momota was appointed a TBS Athlete Ambassador for the 2026 Asian Games in Aichi and Nagoya.

His mentoring activities extended to international players. In August, Canadian singles player Victor Lai travelled to Japan to train with Momota ahead of the 2026 World Championships, crediting the sessions with helping him learn from Momota's footwork and technique. The following month, Momota joined a training session during the Indonesian national team's camp in Tokyo ahead of the 2026 Asian Games, serving as a sparring partner and mentor to men's singles players including Alwi Farhan, Zaki Ubaidillah, and Muhamad Yusuf.

Alongside his coaching and ambassadorial activities, Momota made appearances in non-BWF open and invitational competitions. In July 2026, he defeated China's Ren Chengming to win the men's singles title at the Yonex Shanghai Open. After withdrawing from the 2025 Xi'an edition of the Lin Dan Cup due to back surgery, he competed in the Wuhan edition in November 2026, defeating Wang Zhengxing in the final to win the title.

== Personal life ==
Momota married on 30 December 2025.

== Awards and nominations ==
Award	Year	Category	Result	Ref.
BWF Awards	2018	Male Player of the Year	Nominated	
BWF Awards	2019	Male Player of the Year	Won	

== Achievements ==
=== World Championships ===
Men's singles
Year	Venue	Opponent	Score	Result	Ref.
2015	Istora Senayan, Jakarta, Indonesia	(China) Chen Long	9–21, 15–21	Bronze	
2018	Nanjing Youth Olympic Sports Park, Nanjing, China	(China) Shi Yuqi	21–11, 21–13	Gold	
2019	St. Jakobshalle, Basel, Switzerland	(Denmark) Anders Antonsen	21–9, 21–3	Gold	

=== Asian Championships ===
Men's singles
Year	Venue	Opponent	Score	Result	Ref.
2018	Wuhan Sports Center Gymnasium, Wuhan, China	(China) Chen Long	21–17, 21–13	Gold	
2019	Wuhan Sports Center Gymnasium, Wuhan, China	(China) Shi Yuqi	12–21, 21–18, 21–8	Gold	

=== World Junior Championships ===
Boys' singles
Year	Venue	Opponent	Score	Result	Ref.
2011	Taoyuan Arena, Taoyuan City, Taiwan	(Malaysia) Zulfadli Zulkiffli	18–21, 18–21	Bronze	
2012	Chiba Port Arena, Chiba, Japan	(China) Xue Song	21–17, 19–21, 21–19	Gold	

=== Asian Junior Championships ===
Boys' singles
Year	Venue	Opponent	Score	Result	Ref.
2011	Babu Banarasi Das Indoor Stadium, Lucknow, India	(Malaysia) Zulfadli Zulkiffli	18–21, 19–21	Bronze	
2012	Gimcheon Indoor Stadium, Gimcheon, South Korea	(Malaysia) Soong Joo Ven	21–13, 22–20	Gold	

=== BWF World Tour (16 titles, 6 runners-up) ===
The BWF World Tour, which was announced on 19 March 2017 and implemented in 2018, is a series of elite badminton tournaments sanctioned by the Badminton World Federation (BWF). The BWF World Tour is divided into levels of World Tour Finals, Super 1000, Super 750, Super 500, Super 300 (part of the HSBC World Tour), and the BWF Tour Super 100.

Men's singles
Year	Tournament	Level	Opponent	Score	Result	Ref.
2018	Malaysia Open	Super 750	(Malaysia) Lee Chong Wei	17–21, 21–23	(silver) Runner-up	
2018	Indonesia Open	Super 1000	(Denmark) Viktor Axelsen	21–14, 21–9	(gold) Winner	
2018	Japan Open	Super 750	(Thailand) Khosit Phetpradab	21–14, 21–11	(gold) Winner	
2018	China Open	Super 1000	(Indonesia) Anthony Sinisuka Ginting	21–23, 19–21	(silver) Runner-up	
2018	Denmark Open	Super 750	(Chinese Taipei) Chou Tien-chen	22–20, 16–21, 21–15	(gold) Winner	
2018	Fuzhou China Open	Super 750	(Chinese Taipei) Chou Tien-chen	21–13, 11–21, 21–16	(gold) Winner	
2018	BWF World Tour Finals	World Tour Finals	(China) Shi Yuqi	12–21, 11–21	(silver) Runner-up	
2019	Indonesia Masters	Super 500	(Denmark) Anders Antonsen	16–21, 21–14, 16–21	(silver) Runner-up	
2019	German Open	Super 300	(Japan) Kenta Nishimoto	21–10, 21–16	(gold) Winner	
2019	All England Open	Super 1000	(Denmark) Viktor Axelsen	21–11, 15–21, 21–15	(gold) Winner	
2019	Singapore Open	Super 500	(Indonesia) Anthony Sinisuka Ginting	10–21, 21–19, 21–13	(gold) Winner	
2019	Japan Open	Super 750	(Indonesia) Jonatan Christie	21–16, 21–13	(gold) Winner	
2019	China Open	Super 1000	(Indonesia) Anthony Sinisuka Ginting	19–21, 21–17, 21–19	(gold) Winner	
2019	Korea Open	Super 500	(Chinese Taipei) Chou Tien-chen	21–19, 21–17	(gold) Winner	
2019	Denmark Open	Super 750	(China) Chen Long	21–14, 21–12	(gold) Winner	
2019	Fuzhou China Open	Super 750	(Chinese Taipei) Chou Tien-chen	21–15, 17–21, 21–18	(gold) Winner	
2019	BWF World Tour Finals	World Tour Finals	(Indonesia) Anthony Sinisuka Ginting	17–21, 21–17, 21–14	(gold) Winner	
2020	Malaysia Masters	Super 500	(Denmark) Viktor Axelsen	24–22, 21–11	(gold) Winner	
2021	Denmark Open	Super 1000	(Denmark) Viktor Axelsen	22–20, 18–21, 12–21	(silver) Runner-up	
2021	Indonesia Masters	Super 750	(Denmark) Anders Antonsen	21–17, 21–11	(gold) Winner	
2022	Malaysia Open	Super 750	(Denmark) Viktor Axelsen	4–21, 7–21	(silver) Runner-up	
2023	Korea Masters	Super 300	(Japan) Koki Watanabe	21–16, 21–15	(gold) Winner	

=== BWF Superseries (4 titles) ===
The BWF Superseries, which was launched on 14 December 2006 and implemented in 2007, was a series of elite badminton tournaments, sanctioned by the Badminton World Federation (BWF). From 2011, the circuit consisted of Superseries Premier and Superseries events, followed by the season-ending Superseries Finals.

Men's singles
Year	Tournament	Opponent	Score	Result	Ref.
2015	Singapore Open	(Hong Kong) Hu Yun	21–17, 16–21, 21–15	(gold) Winner	
2015	Indonesia Open	(Denmark) Jan Ø. Jørgensen	16–21, 21–19, 21–7	(gold) Winner	
2015	Dubai World Superseries Finals	(Denmark) Viktor Axelsen	21–15, 21–12	(gold) Winner	
2016	India Open	(Denmark) Viktor Axelsen	21–15, 21–18	(gold) Winner	

BWF Super Series Finals tournament
BWF Super Series Premier tournament
BWF Super Series tournament

=== BWF Grand Prix (2 titles, 1 runner-up) ===
The BWF Grand Prix had two levels, the Grand Prix and Grand Prix Gold. It was a series of badminton tournaments sanctioned by the Badminton World Federation (BWF) and played between 2007 and 2017.

Men's singles
Year	Tournament	Opponent	Score	Result	Ref.
2017	Canada Open	(Japan) Kanta Tsuneyama	20–22, 21–14, 14–21	(silver) Runner-up	
2017	Dutch Open	(Japan) Yu Igarashi	21–10, 21–12	(gold) Winner	
2017	Macau Open	(Indonesia) Ihsan Maulana Mustofa	21–16, 21–10	(gold) Winner	

BWF Grand Prix Gold tournament
BWF Grand Prix tournament

=== BWF International Challenge/Series (7 titles) ===
Men's singles
Year	Tournament	Opponent	Score	Result	Ref.
2013	Estonian International	(Finland) Eetu Heino	20–22, 21–15, 21–15	(gold) Winner	
2013	Swedish Masters	(Netherlands) Eric Pang	21–9, 16–21, 21–18	(gold) Winner	
2013	Austrian International	(Japan) Riichi Takeshita	21–19, 21–12	(gold) Winner	
2017	Yonex / K&D Graphics International	(Guatemala) Kevin Cordón	21–7, 21–15	(gold) Winner	
2017	Belgian International	(Hong Kong) Lee Cheuk Yiu	21–14, 21–18	(gold) Winner	
2017	Czech Open	(France) Thomas Rouxel	21–8, 21–14	(gold) Winner	
2018	Vietnam International	(Malaysia) Goh Giap Chin	21–9, 21–15	(gold) Winner	

BWF International Challenge tournament
BWF International Series tournament

== Career overview ==
Singles	Played	Wins	Losses	Balance
Total	499	388	111	+277

Doubles	Played	Wins	Losses	Balance
Total	6	2	4	-2

== Performance timeline ==
Key

W	Won	F	Finalist	SF	Semi-finalist
QF	Quarter-finalist	#R	Rounds 4, 3, 2, 1	RR	Round-robin stage
Q#	Qualification round	A	Absent	w/d	Withdrew
G	Gold	S	Silver	B	Bronze
NH	Not held	N/A	Not applicable	DNQ	Did not qualify

=== National team ===
- Junior level

Team events	2010	2011	2012	Ref.
Asian Junior Championships	RR	QF	G	
World Junior Championships	5th	5th	S	

- Senior level

Team events	2014	2015	2016	2017	2018	2019	2020	2021	2022	2023	2024	Ref.
Asia Team Championships	NH		S	NH	6th	NH	A	NH	A	NH	B	
Asian Games	QF	NH			B	NH			w/d	NH		
Thomas Cup	G	NH	A	NH	S	NH	B	NH	B	NH	5th	
Sudirman Cup	NH	S	NH	A	NH	S	NH	S	NH	A	NH	

=== Individual competitions ===
==== Junior level ====
- Boys' singles

Event	2010	2011	2012	Ref.
Asian Junior Championships	4R	B	G	
World Junior Championships	3R	B	G	

- Boys' doubles

Event	2010	2011	Ref.
Asian Junior Championships	2R	2R	
World Junior Championships	A	3R	

- Mixed doubles

Event	2010	2011	Ref.
Asian Junior Championships	A	2R	
World Junior Championships	2R	A	

==== Senior level ====
Events	2012	2013	2014	2015	2016	2017	2018	2019	2020	2021	2022	Ref.
Asian Championships	3R	2R	1R	w/d	w/d	A	G	G	NH		1R	
Asian Games	NH		3R	NH			3R	NH			A	
World Championships	NH	DNQ	1R	B	NH	DNQ	G	G	NH	w/d	2R	
Olympic Games	DNQ	NH			DNQ	NH			RR	NH		

Tournament	BWF Superseries / Grand Prix								BWF World Tour							Best	Ref.
Tournament	2010	2011	2012	2013	2014	2015	2016	2017	2018	2019	2020	2021	2022	2023	2024	Best	Ref.
Malaysia Open	A				QF	QF	2R	A	F	2R	NH		F	A		F ('18, '22)	
India Open	A			1R	1R	2R	W	A			NH		A	1R	A	W ('16)	
Indonesia Masters	A		1R	A				NH	A	F	w/d	W	A	1R	Q1	W ('21)	
German Open	A			2R	3R	w/d	A		QF	W	NH		1R	SF	A	W ('19)	
French Open	A			1R	SF	2R	A		SF	QF	NH	SF	w/d	A		SF ('14, '18, '21)	
All England Open	A				QF	QF	QF	A		W	A	QF	QF	1R	A	W ('19)	
Swiss Open	A								QF	A	NH	A				QF ('18)	
Thailand Open	NH	A			NH	A				w/d	w/d	NH	1R	A	Ret.	1R ('22)	
Thailand Open	NH	A			NH	A				w/d	w/d	NH	1R	A	Ret.	1R ('22)	
Malaysia Masters	A		2R	A						1R	W	NH	2R	1R	Ret.	W ('20)	
Singapore Open	A			QF	1R	W	w/d	A		W	NH		A		Ret.	W ('15, '19)	
Indonesia Open	A			Q2	1R	W	A		W	2R	NH	2R	1R	1R	Ret.	W ('15, '18)	
Australian Open	A			3R	QF	2R	A				NH		A	1R	Ret.	QF ('14)	
U.S. Open	A			SF	A						NH			A	Ret.	SF ('13)	
Canada Open	A	2R	3R	w/d	A			F	A		NH		A	1R	Ret.	F ('17)	
Japan Open	A	Q1	Q2	2R	1R	2R	A		W	W	NH		1R	1R	Ret.	W ('18, '19)	
Korea Open	A				2R	SF	A		QF	W	NH		A	2R	Ret.	W ('19)	
Vietnam Open	A		QF	A							NH		A		Ret.	QF ('12)	
Hong Kong Open	A			1R	1R	2R	A		SF	w/d	NH			A	Ret.	SF ('18)	
China Open	A		1R	SF	QF	2R	A		F	W	NH			A	Ret.	W ('19)	
Denmark Open	A			1R	2R	QF	A		W	W	w/d	F	w/d	A	Ret.	W ('18, '19)	
Korea Masters	2R	A									NH		A	W	Ret.	W ('23)	
Japan Masters	NH													QF	Ret.	QF ('23)	
China Masters	A		Q2	QF	A				W	W	NH			A	Ret.	W ('18, '19)	
BWF Superseries / World Tour Finals	DNQ				RR	W	DNQ		F	W	DNQ	RR	DNQ		Ret.	W ('15, '19)	
Dutch Open	A							W	A		NH	N/A			Ret.	W ('17)	
Macau Open	A	2R	1R	2R	A			W	A		NH				Ret.	W ('17)	
Year-end ranking	530	234	90	17	13	3	—	48	1	1	1	2	18	38	—	1	
Tournament	2010	2011	2012	2013	2014	2015	2016	2017	2018	2019	2020	2021	2022	2023	2024	Best	Ref.

== Record against selected opponents ==
Record against year-end Finals finalists, World Championships semi-finalists, and Olympic quarter-finalists. Accurate as of 23 August 2026.

Player	M	W	L	Diff.
(China) Chen Jin	1	0	1	–1
(China) Chen Long	10	5	5	0
(China) Du Pengyu	2	1	1	0
(China) Lin Dan	5	4	1	+3
(China) Shi Yuqi	12	6	6	0
(China) Tian Houwei	2	1	1	0
(China) Zhao Junpeng	1	0	1	–1
(Chinese Taipei) Chou Tien-chen	16	14	2	+12
(Denmark) Anders Antonsen	7	6	1	+5
(Denmark) Viktor Axelsen	17	14	3	+11
(Denmark) Jan Ø. Jørgensen	8	5	3	+2
(Denmark) Hans-Kristian Vittinghus	10	9	1	+8
(England) Rajiv Ouseph	2	2	0	+2
(Guatemala) Kevin Cordón	1	1	0	+1
(India) Parupalli Kashyap	5	5	0	+5
(India) Srikanth Kidambi	19	16	3	+13
(India) B. Sai Praneeth	7	5	2	+3

Player	M	W	L	Diff.
(India) Prannoy H. S.	8	7	1	+6
(India) Lakshya Sen	3	2	1	+1
(Indonesia) Anthony Sinisuka Ginting	16	11	5	+6
(Indonesia) Tommy Sugiarto	12	9	3	+6
(Japan) Sho Sasaki	2	1	1	0
(Malaysia) Lee Chong Wei	4	2	2	0
(Malaysia) Lee Zii Jia	12	8	4	+4
(Malaysia) Liew Daren	4	4	0	+4
(Singapore) Loh Kean Yew	3	2	1	+1
(South Korea) Heo Kwang-hee	6	4	2	+2
(South Korea) Lee Hyun-il	1	1	0	+1
(South Korea) Son Wan-ho	11	6	5	+1
(Thailand) Boonsak Ponsana	4	3	1	+2
(Thailand) Kunlavut Vitidsarn	3	2	1	+1
(Thailand) Kantaphon Wangcharoen	3	3	0	+3
(Vietnam) Nguyễn Tiến Minh	6	3	3	0

== Equipment ==
Momota has used Yonex badminton racquets, including the Astrox 99, which he adopted at the 2018 World Championships. In 2020, Yonex introduced a new colour scheme for the Astrox 99 developed with input from Momota. He subsequently collaborated with Yonex on the development of a redesigned Astrox 99 series released in 2021.
