= Jan Ø. Jørgensen =

Danish badminton player (born 1987)

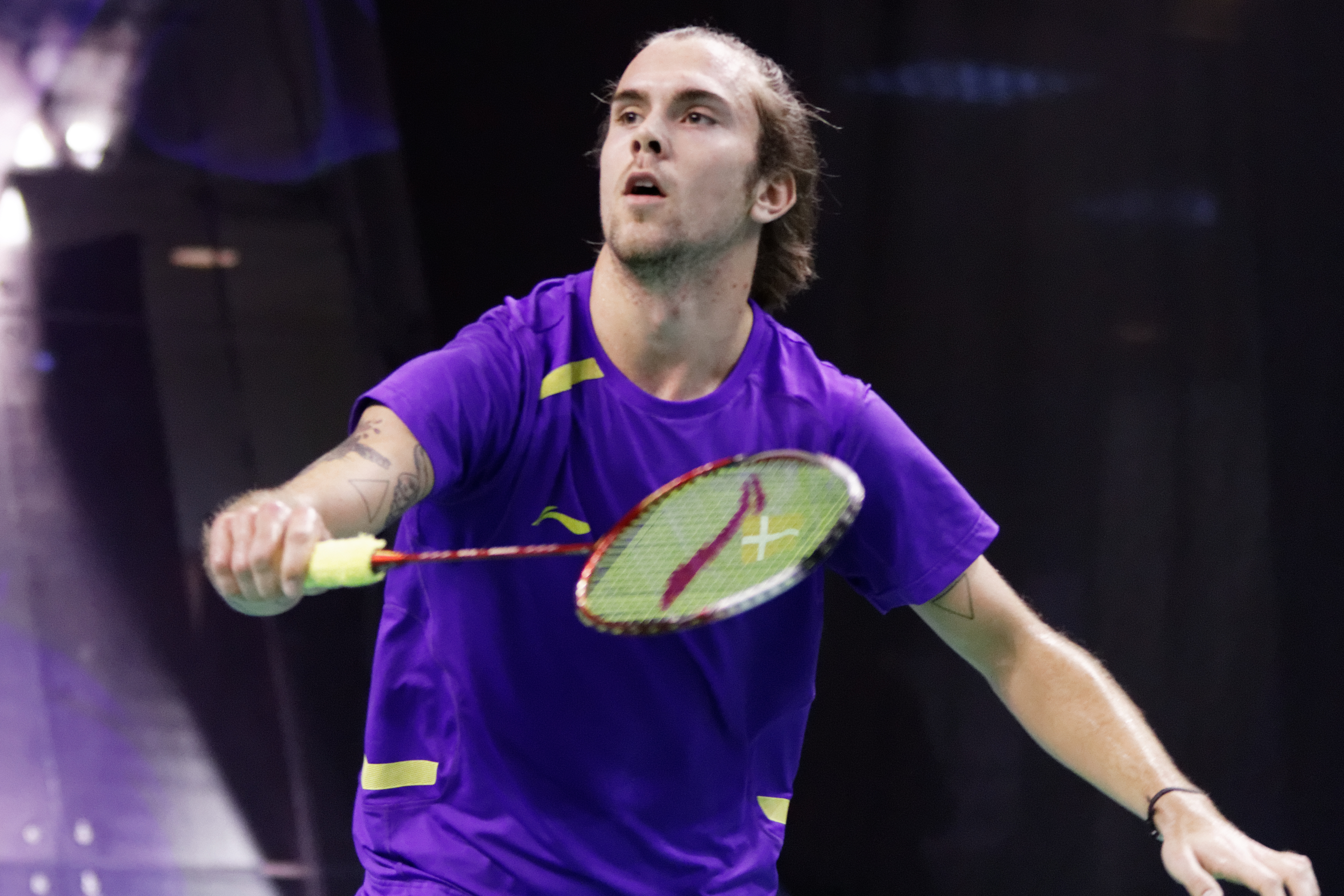
- Jan Ø. Jørgensen at the 2013 French Super Series.

Personal information
- Born: Jan Østergaard Jørgensen; 31 December 1987 (age 38) Svenstrup, Aalborg, Denmark
- Years active: 2005–2020
- Height: 1.85 m (6 ft 1 in)

Sport
- Country: Denmark
- Sport: Badminton
- Handedness: Right
- Retired: 16 October 2020

Men's singles
- Career record: 425 wins, 226 losses
- Highest ranking: 2 (22 January 2015)
- BWF profile
Medal record
Men's badminton
Representing Denmark
World Championships
| Bronze medal – third place | 2015 Jakarta | Men's singles |
Sudirman Cup
| Silver medal – second place | 2011 Qingdao | Mixed team |
| Bronze medal – third place | 2013 Kuala Lumpur | Mixed team |
Thomas Cup
| Gold medal – first place | 2016 Kunshan | Men's team |
| Bronze medal – third place | 2012 Wuhan | Men's team |
| Bronze medal – third place | 2018 Bangkok | Men's team |
European Championships
| Gold medal – first place | 2014 Kazan | Men's singles |
| Silver medal – second place | 2010 Manchester | Men's singles |
| Silver medal – second place | 2016 La Roche-sur-Yon | Men's singles |
| Bronze medal – third place | 2008 Herning | Men's singles |
| Bronze medal – third place | 2012 Karlskrona | Men's singles |
| Bronze medal – third place | 2018 Huelva | Men's singles |
European Mixed Team Championships
| Gold medal – first place | 2009 Liverpool | Mixed team |
| Gold medal – first place | 2011 Amsterdam | Mixed team |
| Gold medal – first place | 2015 Leuven | Mixed team |
| Gold medal – first place | 2017 Lubin | Mixed team |
European Men's Team Championships
| Gold medal – first place | 2008 Almere | Men's team |
| Gold medal – first place | 2010 Warsaw | Men's team |
| Gold medal – first place | 2012 Amsterdam | Men's team |
| Gold medal – first place | 2014 Basel | Men's team |
| Gold medal – first place | 2016 Kazan | Men's team |
| Gold medal – first place | 2018 Kazan | Men's team |
| Gold medal – first place | 2020 Liévin | Men's team |
European Junior Championships
| Gold medal – first place | 2005 Den Bosch | Mixed team |

Jan Østergaard Jørgensen (born 31 December 1987) is a Danish retired badminton player who played for SIF (Skovshoved) in the national league. He won the men's singles title at the 2014 European Championships, and was the bronze medalist at the 2015 World Championships. He joined the Denmark winning team at the 2016 Thomas Cup in Kunshan, China.

== Career ==
Jørgensen won the European Championship title in 2014. He won the bronze medal at the 2008 European Badminton Championships and 2012 European Badminton Championships and the silver medal at the 2010 European Badminton Championships and 2016 European Badminton Championships. He won the Danish Championship title in 2012, 2013 and again in 2015 (Withdrawn due to injury in 2014). He was the runner up at 2009 China Open Super Series and won Denmark Open in 2010, French Open (badminton) in 2013, Indonesia Open (badminton) in 2014 and the invitational Copenhagen Masters in 2009, 2011 and 2012. In 2014, he became the first European male singles player to win the Indonesia Open. In March 2015 he reached the final of the All England Super Series, but lost against Chen Long, from China, 21–15, 17–21, 15–21.

== Personal life ==
Jørgensen is married to Danish handball player Stine Jørgensen and they have twins together.

== Achievements ==
=== BWF World Championships ===
Men's singles
| Year | Venue | Opponent | Score | Result |
|---|---|---|---|---|
| 2015 | Istora Senayan, Jakarta, Indonesia | (Malaysia) Lee Chong Wei | 7–21, 19–21 | Bronze |

=== European Championships ===
Men's singles
| Year | Venue | Opponent | Score | Result |
|---|---|---|---|---|
| 2008 | Messecenter, Herning, Denmark | (Denmark) Kenneth Jonassen | 12–21, 9–21 | Bronze |
| 2010 | Manchester Evening News Arena, Manchester, England | (Denmark) Peter Gade | 14–21, 11–21 | Silver |
| 2012 | Telenor Arena, Karlskrona, Sweden | (Germany) Marc Zwiebler | 19–21, 15–21 | Bronze |
| 2014 | Gymnastics Center, Kazan, Russia | (England) Rajiv Ouseph | 21–18, 21–10 | Gold |
| 2016 | Vendéspace, La Roche-sur-Yon, France | (Denmark) Viktor Axelsen | 11–21, 16–21 | Silver |
| 2018 | Palacio de los Deportes Carolina Marín, Huelva, Spain | (England) Rajiv Ouseph | 17–21, 21–18, 15–21 | Bronze |

=== BWF World Tour (1 runner-up) ===
The BWF World Tour, which was announced on 19 March 2017 and implemented in 2018, is a series of elite badminton tournaments sanctioned by the Badminton World Federation (BWF). The BWF World Tours are divided into levels of World Tour Finals, Super 1000, Super 750, Super 500, Super 300 (part of the HSBC World Tour), and the BWF Tour Super 100.

Men's singles
| Year | Tournament | Level | Opponent | Score | Result |
|---|---|---|---|---|---|
| 2018 | Swiss Open | Super 300 | (India) Sameer Verma | 15–21, 13–21 | (silver) Runner-up |

=== BWF Superseries (4 titles, 5 runners-up) ===
The BWF Superseries, which was launched on 14 December 2006 and implemented in 2007, was a series of elite badminton tournaments, sanctioned by the Badminton World Federation (BWF). BWF Superseries levels were Superseries and Superseries Premier. A season of Superseries consisted of twelve tournaments around the world that had been introduced since 2011. Successful players were invited to the Superseries Finals, which were held at the end of each year.

Men's singles
| Year | Tournament | Opponent | Score | Result |
|---|---|---|---|---|
| 2016 | China Open | (China) Chen Long | 22–20, 21–13 | (gold) Winner |
| 2016 | Japan Open | (Malaysia) Lee Chong Wei | 18–21, 21–15, 16–21 | (silver) Runner-up |
| 2016 | Indonesia Open | (Malaysia) Lee Chong Wei | 21–17, 19–21, 17–21 | (silver) Runner-up |
| 2015 | Indonesia Open | (Japan) Kento Momota | 21–16, 19–21, 7–21 | (silver) Runner-up |
| 2015 | All England Open | (China) Chen Long | 21–15, 17–21, 15–21 | (silver) Runner-up |
| 2014 | Indonesia Open | (Japan) Kenichi Tago | 21–18, 21–18 | (gold) Winner |
| 2013 | French Open | (Japan) Kenichi Tago | 21–19, 23–21 | (gold) Winner |
| 2010 | Denmark Open | (Indonesia) Taufik Hidayat | 21–19, 21–19 | (gold) Winner |
| 2009 | China Open | (China) Lin Dan | 12–21, 12–21 | (silver) Runner-up |

BWF Super Series Finals tournament
BWF Super Series Premier tournament
BWF Super Series tournament

=== BWF Grand Prix (2 titles) ===
The BWF Grand Prix had two levels, the Grand Prix and Grand Prix Gold. It was a series of badminton tournaments sanctioned by the Badminton World Federation (BWF) and played between 2007 and 2017.

Men's singles
| Year | Tournament | Opponent | Score | Result |
|---|---|---|---|---|
| 2009 | Bitburger Open | (Netherlands) Eric Pang | 12–21, 21–13, 21–15 | (gold) Winner |
| 2015 | German Open | (Indonesia) Dionysius Hayom Rumbaka | 21–12, 21–13 | (gold) Winner |

BWF Grand Prix Gold tournament
BWF Grand Prix tournament

=== BWF International Challenge/Series (4 titles, 2 runners-up) ===
Men's singles
| Year | Tournament | Opponent | Score | Result |
|---|---|---|---|---|
| 2006 | Czech International | (Denmark) Peter Mikkelsen | 21–18, 21–15 | (gold) Winner |
| 2006 | Irish International | (Denmark) Jens-Kristian Leth | 20–22, 21–23 | (silver) Runner-up |
| 2007 | Hungarian International | (Finland) Ville Lång | 21–6, 21–5 | (gold) Winner |
| 2008 | Swedish International | (Germany) Marc Zwiebler | 13–21, 21–23 | (silver) Runner-up |
| 2009 | Swedish International | (Netherlands) Dicky Palyama | 16–21, 22–20, 21–17 | (gold) Winner |
| 2011 | Denmark International | (Denmark) Hans-Kristian Vittinghus | 21–15, 21–12 | (gold) Winner |

BWF International Challenge tournament
BWF International Series tournament

== Record against selected opponents ==
Record against year-end Finals finalists, World Championships semi finalists, and Olympic quarter finalists, accurate as of 20 November 2023.

- (China) Chen Jin 4–4
- (China) Chen Long 2–11
- (China) Chen Yu 0–1
- (China) Du Pengyu 2–3
- (China) Lin Dan 7–9
- (China) Shi Yuqi 0–1
- (China) Tian Houwei 6–3
- (Chinese Taipei) Chou Tien-Chen 6–6
- (Denmark) Viktor Axelsen 3–5
- (Denmark) Peter Gade 3–4
- (Denmark) Hans-Kristian Vittinghus 5–1
- (England) Rajiv Ouseph 10–3
- (India) Parupalli Kashyap 4–3
- (India) Srikanth Kidambi 2–4
- (India) B. Sai Praneeth 2–0
- (Indonesia) Anthony Sinisuka Ginting 4–2
- (Indonesia) Taufik Hidayat 2–2
- (Indonesia) Sony Dwi Kuncoro 2–0
- (Indonesia) Tommy Sugiarto 3–1
- (Japan) Kento Momota 3–5
- (Japan) Sho Sasaki 3–3
- (Malaysia) Lee Chong Wei 1–17
- (Malaysia) Liew Daren 1–4
- (Malaysia) Wong Choong Hann 2–1
- (Singapore) Loh Kean Yew 0–1
- (South Korea) Lee Hyun-il 2–3
- (South Korea) Park Sung-hwan 2–1
- (South Korea) Shon Seung-mo 0–1
- (South Korea) Son Wan-ho 3–3
- (Thailand) Boonsak Ponsana 11–2
- (Thailand) Kantaphon Wangcharoen 1–0
- (Vietnam) Nguyễn Tiến Minh 2–6
