= B. Sai Praneeth =

Indian badminton player (born 1992)

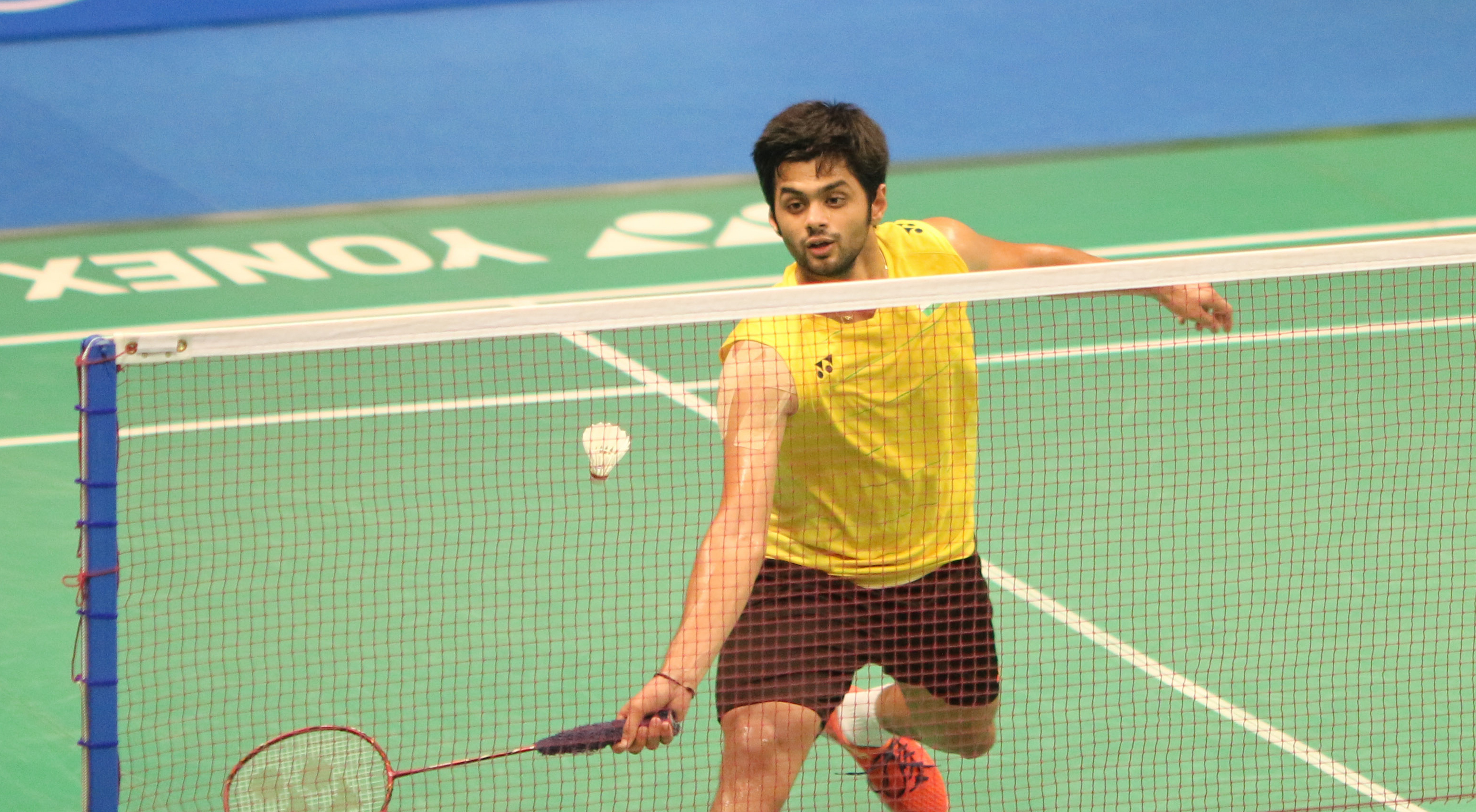

Personal information
- Born: Bhamidipati Sai Praneeth; 10 August 1992 (age 34) Hyderabad, Telangana, India
- Height: 1.76 m (5 ft 9 in)

Sport
- Country: India
- Sport: Badminton
- Handedness: Right
- Coached by: Pullela Gopichand
- Retired: 4 March 2024

Men's singles
- Career record: 236 wins, 168 losses
- Highest ranking: 10 (12 November 2019)
- BWF profile
Medal record
Men's badminton
Representing India
World Championships
Bronze medal – third place	2019 Basel	Men's singles
Asia Team Championships
Bronze medal – third place	2016 Hyderabad	Men's team
Bronze medal – third place	2020 Manila	Men's team
South Asian Games
Gold medal – first place	2016 Guwahati-Shillong	Men's team
World Junior Championships
Bronze medal – third place	2010 Guadalajara	Boys' singles
Commonwealth Youth Games
Bronze medal – third place	2008 Pune	Boys' doubles

Bhamidipati Sai Praneeth (born 10 August 1992) is an Indian former badminton player. He became the first Indian male shuttler in 36 years to win a bronze medal in the BWF World Championships in 2019 after Prakash Padukone in 1983. Sai Praneeth was honoured with the Arjuna Award in 2019. His parents are Seshadri Deekshitulu and Madhavi Latha of Palakollu, West Godavari district, Andhra Pradesh. His maternal aunt was a national level badminton player.

== Career ==
Sai Praneeth is an India badminton player who currently trains at the Gopichand Badminton Academy in Hyderabad. The right-handed Indian stunned the 2003 All England Champion Muhammad Hafiz Hashim of Malaysia at the 2013 Thailand Open Grand Prix Gold tournament in the first round.

In 2013, Praneeth defeated Taufik Hidayat unexpectedly early in front of a home crowd. He defeated Taufik Hidayat in the first round match of the Djarum Indonesia Open 2013, with the final score being 15–21, 21–12, 21–17. A few days later, on 19 June 2013, he again upstaged a much higher ranked Hu Yun of Hong Kong in the Singapore Super Series.

At the 2016 All England Super Series Premier, Sai Praneeth defeated the 2nd seed Lee Chong Wei of Malaysia in the 1st Round 24–22, 22–20 in straight games. In July 2016, he won his maiden Grand Prix title, the 2016 Canada Open Grand Prix in the men's singles category. In the final match played at Calgary, Sai Praneeth defeated Lee Hyun-il of South Korea 21–12, 21–10. In 2017, he won the Singapore Open Super Series after beating compatriot Srikanth Kidambi in the final in three games, hence becoming the fourth Indian to win a superseries title after Saina Nehwal, Srikanth Kidambi and P. V. Sindhu.

In 2019, Praneeth won a bronze medal at the BWF World Championships in Basel, Switzerland after losing in the semifinals to eventual champion Kento Momota. In his route to the semifinal, he beat sixth seed Anthony Sinisuka Ginting of Indonesia in the third round and the reigning Asian Games Champion Jonatan Christie of Indonesia in the quarterfinals.

Praneeth qualified for the 2020 Tokyo Olympics, where he was seeded thirteenth. However, he made a shock exit at the group stage after losing to Misha Zilberman of Israel and Mark Caljouw of Netherlands.

Praneeth announced his retirement through his social media account Instagram on 4 March 2024. He will start a new journey as a coach in the United States.

== Achievements ==
=== World Championships ===
Men's singles
Year	Venue	Opponent	Score	Result
2019	St. Jakobshalle; Basel, Switzerland	(Japan) Kento Momota	13–21, 8–21	Bronze

=== World Junior Championships ===
Boys' singles
Year	Venue	Opponent	Score	Result
2010	Domo del Code Jalisco; Guadalajara, Mexico	(Denmark) Viktor Axelsen	21–19, 15–21, 15–21	Bronze

=== Commonwealth Youth Games ===
Boys' doubles
Year	Venue	Partner	Opponent	Score	Result
2008	Shree Shiv Chhatrapati Sports Complex; Pune, India	(India) Pranav Chopra	(England) Gary Fox (England) Richard Morris	21–18, 23–21	Bronze

=== BWF World Tour (1 runner-up) ===
The BWF World Tour, announced on 19 March 2017 and implemented in 2018, is a series of elite badminton tournaments, sanctioned by Badminton World Federation (BWF). The BWF World Tour are divided into six levels, namely World Tour Finals, Super 1000, Super 750, Super 500, Super 300 (part of the HSBC World Tour), and the BWF Tour Super 100.

Men's singles
Year	Tournament	Level	Opponent	Score	Result
2019	Swiss Open	Super 300	(China) Shi Yuqi	21–19, 18–21, 12–21	(silver) Runner-up

=== BWF Superseries (1 title) ===
The BWF Superseries, launched on 14 December 2006 and implemented in 2007, was a series of elite badminton tournaments, sanctioned by Badminton World Federation (BWF). BWF Superseries had two levels: Superseries and Superseries Premier. A season of Superseries featured twelve tournaments around the world, which introduced since 2011, with successful players invited to the Superseries Finals held at the year-end.

Men's singles
Year	Tournament	Opponent	Score	Result
2017	Singapore Open	(India) Srikanth Kidambi	17–21, 21–17, 21–12	(gold) Winner

BWF Super Series Finals tournament
BWF Super Series Premier tournament
BWF Super Series tournament

=== BWF Grand Prix (2 titles, 1 runner-up) ===
The BWF Grand Prix has two levels, the BWF Grand Prix and Grand Prix Gold. It is a series of badminton tournaments sanctioned by the Badminton World Federation (BWF) since 2007.

Men's singles
Year	Tournament	Opponent	Score	Result
2016	Canada Open	(South Korea) Lee Hyun-il	21–12, 21–10	(gold) Winner
2017	Syed Modi International	(India) Sameer Verma	19–21, 16–21	(silver) Runner-up
2017	Thailand Open	(Indonesia) Jonatan Christie	17–21, 21–18, 21–19	(gold) Winner

BWF Grand Prix Gold tournament
BWF Grand Prix tournament

=== BWF International Challenge/Series (6 titles, 1 runner-up) ===
Men's singles
Year	Tournament	Opponent	Score	Result
2010	Iran Fajr International	(Iran) Mohammadreza Kheradmandi	21–19, 21–18	(gold) Winner
2012	Bahrain International	(Sri Lanka) Niluka Karunaratne	14–21, 21–14, 21–17	(gold) Winner
2012	Tata Open India International	(India) R. M. V. Gurusaidutt	19–21, 12–21	(silver) Runner-up
2015	Sri Lanka International	(India) Sameer Verma	21–18, 21–8	(gold) Winner
2015	Lagos International	(Poland) Adrian Dziolko	21–14, 21–11	(gold) Winner
2015	Bangladesh International	(India) Sameer Verma	21–14, 8–21, 21–17	(gold) Winner

Men's doubles
Year	Tournament	Partner	Opponent	Score	Result
2010	Iran Fajr International	(India) Pranav Chopra	(Iran) Ali Shahhosseini (Iran) Mohammadreza Kheradmandi	21–17, 21–12	(gold) Winner

BWF International Challenge tournament
BWF International Series tournament

== Record against selected opponents ==
Record against year-end Finals finalists, World Championships semi-finalists, and Olympic quarter-finalists. Accurate as of 9 April 2024.

Player	Matches	Win	Lost	Diff.
(China) Chen Long	3	1	2	–1
(China) Lin Dan	3	1	2	–1
(China) Shi Yuqi	5	0	5	–5
(China) Du Pengyu	2	0	2	–2
(China) Zhao Junpeng	2	0	2	–2
(Chinese Taipei) Chou Tien-chen	5	0	5	–5
(Denmark) Viktor Axelsen	6	0	6	–6
(Denmark) Anders Antonsen	4	1	3	–2
(Denmark) Hans-Kristian Vittinghus	5	1	4	–3
(Denmark) Jan Ø. Jørgensen	2	0	2	–2
(England) Rajiv Ouseph	3	2	1	+1
(Guatemala) Kevin Cordón	1	1	0	+1
(India) Srikanth Kidambi	10	5	5	0

Player	Matches	Win	Lost	Diff.
(India) Prannoy H. S.	5	2	3	–1
(Indonesia) Anthony Sinisuka Ginting	8	3	5	–2
(Indonesia) Taufik Hidayat	1	1	0	+1
(Indonesia) Sony Dwi Kuncoro	3	0	3	–3
(Indonesia) Tommy Sugiarto	5	3	2	+1
(Japan) Kento Momota	7	2	5	–3
(Malaysia) Lee Chong Wei	5	1	4	–3
(Malaysia) Liew Daren	3	1	2	–1
(Malaysia) Wong Choong Hann	1	1	0	+1
(South Korea) Lee Hyun-il	3	1	2	–1
(South Korea) Son Wan-ho	5	1	4	–3
(Thailand) Kunlavut Vitidsarn	1	0	1	–1
(Thailand) Kantaphon Wangcharoen	7	4	3	+1
