= Liew Daren =

Malaysian badminton coach and former player (born 1987)

Liew Daren 刘国伦
Personal information
- Born: 6 August 1987 (age 39) Kuala Lumpur, Malaysia
- Height: 1.78 m (5 ft 10 in)
- Weight: 59 kg (130 lb)

Sport
- Country: Malaysia
- Sport: Badminton
- Handedness: Right
- Retired: 26 April 2023

Men's singles
- Career record: 231 wins, 206 losses
- Highest ranking: 10 (7 March 2013)
- BWF profile
Medal record
Men's badminton
Representing Malaysia
World Championships
Bronze medal – third place	2018 Nanjing	Men's singles
Thomas Cup
Silver medal – second place	2014 New Delhi	Men's team
Commonwealth Games
Gold medal – first place	2014 Glasgow	Mixed team
Southeast Asian Games
Silver medal – second place	2009 Vientiane	Men's team
Silver medal – second place	2011 Jakarta	Men's team

Liew Daren
- Traditional Chinese: 劉國倫
- Simplified Chinese: 刘国伦
Transcriptions
Standard Mandarin
- Hanyu Pinyin: Liú Guólún

Liew Daren (born 6 August 1987) is a Malaysian badminton coach and former player. He has served the coach of Olympic bronze medalist Lee Zii Jia since 2025. As a player, his biggest success throughout his career is having won the 2012 French Open Super Series. He reached a career high ranking of World No.10. He also represented Malaysia competed at the 2010 Guangzhou Asian Games and 2014 Glasgow Commonwealth Games.

== Early life ==
Liew was born in Kuala Lumpur, Malaysia and was educated at the Taman Midah Primary School. He began playing badminton at the age of seven. His brother was once a national badminton player. Liew started to play badminton professionally in 1998.

== Career ==
During the 2012 Thomas Cup quarter-final, he was defeated by Lin Dan from China, but not before he brought it into a rubber game of 21–17, 9–21 and 5–21. His best performance was during the Yonex French Open, where he won his first Super Series title on 28 October 2012 after beating Viktor Axelsen from Denmark with the scores of 21–18 and 21–17.

The 2014 Thomas Cup finals saw Liew facing off against Takuma Ueda from Japan in a gripping battle to break the tie between Malaysia and Japan, who were even at 2–2 as they entered the decisive third Men's Singles match. Liew lost to Ueda after the match went into a rubber game, scoring 21–12, 18–21 and 21–17.

In March 2022, Liew was appointed as Lee Zii Jia's assistant coach. Since January 2023, Liew has been carrying on his duty as Lee's part-time coach following the departure of Lee's coach, Indra Wijaya in November 2022.

On 26 April 2023, Liew confirmed his retirement from professional badminton and would pay attention in coaching Lee Zii Jia.

On 20 December 2024, Liew was given a 12-month suspension from all badminton-related activities by BWF for betting and match-fixing.

On 30 December 2025, coach Yeoh Kay Bin departed from Team Lee Zii Jia (LZJ) after a challenging 2025 season marked by Lee's injuries and limited competitiveness, Liew then returned as a coach after completing the suspension ended on 20 December 2025, making Liew the chosen replacement to fill the coaching vacancy.

== Achievements ==
=== BWF World Championships ===
Men's singles

Year	Venue	Opponent	Score	Result
2018	Nanjing Youth Olympic Sports Park, Nanjing, China	(Japan) Kento Momota	16–21, 5–21	Bronze

=== BWF Superseries (1 title) ===
The BWF Superseries, launched on 14 December 2006 and implemented in 2007, is a series of elite badminton tournaments, sanctioned by Badminton World Federation (BWF). BWF Superseries has two level such as Superseries and Superseries Premier. A season of Superseries features twelve tournaments around the world, which introduced since 2011, with successful players invited to the Superseries Finals held at the year end.

Men's singles

Year	Tournament	Opponent	Score	Result
2012	French Open	(Denmark) Viktor Axelsen	21–18, 21–17	(gold) Winner

BWF Superseries Finals tournament
BWF Superseries Premier tournament
BWF Superseries tournament

=== BWF Grand Prix (2 runners-up) ===
The BWF Grand Prix has two levels, Grand Prix and Grand Prix Gold. It is a series of badminton tournaments, sanctioned by the Badminton World Federation (BWF) since 2007.

Men's singles

Year	Tournament	Opponent	Score	Result
2016	Korea Masters	(South Korea) Son Wan-ho	13–21, 16–21	(silver) Runner-up
2016	Chinese Taipei Masters	(India) Sourabh Varma	10–12, 10–12, 3–3 Retired	(silver) Runner-up

BWF Grand Prix Gold tournament
BWF Grand Prix tournament

=== BWF International Challenge/Series (2 titles) ===
Men's singles

Year	Tournament	Opponent	Score	Result
2015	Polish Open	(Denmark) Emil Holst	21–15, 21–11	(gold) Winner
2005	Chinese Taipei Satellite	(Singapore) Erwin Djohan		(gold) Winner

BWF International Challenge tournament
BWF International Series tournament
