= 2015 Korea Masters Grand Prix Gold =

Tournament details
- Dates: 3–8 November
- Level: Grand Prix Gold
- Total prize money: US$120,000
- Venue: Hwasan Gymnasium
- Location: Jeonju, South Korea

Champions
- Men's singles: (South Korea) Lee Dong-keun
- Women's singles: (Japan) Sayaka Sato
- Men's doubles: (South Korea) Kim Gi-jung (South Korea) Kim Sa-rang
- Women's doubles: (South Korea) Chang Ye-na (South Korea) Lee So-hee
- Mixed doubles: (South Korea) Ko Sung-hyun (South Korea) Kim Ha-na

The 2015 Korea Masters Grand Prix Gold was the sixteenth badminton tournament of the 2015 BWF Grand Prix and Grand Prix Gold. The tournament was held in Hwasan Gymnasium, Jeonju, South Korea November 3–8, 2015 and had a total purse of $120,000.

== Men's singles ==
=== Seeds ===
1. (South Korea) Son Wan-ho (semifinals)
2. (South Korea) Lee Hyun-il (final)
3. (Chinese Taipei) Hsu Jen-hao (first round)
4. (South Korea) Lee Dong-keun (champion)
5. (France) Brice Leverdez (first round)
6. (South Korea) Jeon Hyeok-jin (semifinals)
7. (Indonesia) Ihsan Maulana Mustofa (first round)
8. (Indonesia) Jonatan Christie (quarterfinals)
9. (Malaysia) Zulfadli Zulkiffli (third round)
10. (Japan) Kazumasa Sakai (third round)
11. (Israel) Misha Zilberman (withdrew)
12. (Poland) Adrian Dziolko (second round)
13. (Indonesia) Anthony Sinisuka Ginting (second round)
14. (Czech Republic) Petr Koukal (first round)
15. (Malaysia) Iskandar Zulkarnain Zainuddin (second round)
16. (Malaysia) Soo Teck Zhi (second round)

=== Finals ===
Quarterfinals
1	(South Korea) Son Wan-ho	21	21
(South Korea) Ha Young-woong	16	17
4	(South Korea) Lee Dong-keun	21	18	21
8	(Indonesia) Jonatan Christie	10	21	8
6	(South Korea) Jeon Hyeok-jin	22	7	21
(Japan) Kenta Nishimoto	20	21	12
(South Korea) Heo Kwang-hee	16	21	13
2	(South Korea) Lee Hyun-il	21	17	21

Semifinals
1	(South Korea) Son Wan-ho	13	16
4	(South Korea) Lee Dong-keun	21	21
6	(South Korea) Jeon Hyeok-jin	12	22
2	(South Korea) Lee Hyun-il	21	24

Final
4	(South Korea) Lee Dong-keun	17	21	21
2	(South Korea) Lee Hyun-il	21	14	14

=== Top half ===
==== Section 1 ====
First Round
1	(South Korea) Son W-h	21	21
Q7	(South Korea) Woo S-h	12	10
(Japan) K Tsuneyama	21	21
(South Korea) Um J-k	11	13
13	(Indonesia) A S Ginting	21	21
Q5	(South Korea) Park M-h	17	17
(South Korea) Choi Y-w	17	17
(China) Qiao B	21	21

Second Round
1	(South Korea) Son W-h	21	21
(Japan) K Tsuneyama	12	15
13	(Indonesia) A S Ginting	14	16
(China) Qiao B	21	21

Third Round
1	(South Korea) Son W-h	21	21
(China) Qiao B	18	10

==== Section 2 ====
First Round
5	(France) B Leverdez	21	10	15
(South Korea) Seo S-j	17	21	21
(South Korea) Ha Y-w	21	21
(Chinese Taipei) Kuo P-c	10	14
16	(Malaysia) Soo T Z	21	21
(South Korea) Han K-h	18	17
(Poland) M Rogalski	15	8
(Indonesia) M B Pangisthu	21	21

Second Round
(South Korea) Seo S-j	10	15
(South Korea) Ha Y-w	21	21
16	(Malaysia) Soo T Z	7	16
(Indonesia) M B Pangisthu	21	21

Third Round
(South Korea) Ha Y-w	21	21
(Indonesia) M B Pangisthu	14	8

==== Section 3 ====
First Round
4	(South Korea) Lee D-k	21	21
(Chinese Taipei) Lin Y-h	18	5
(China) Guo K	21	21
(South Korea) Kim D-h	13	12
9	(Malaysia) Zf Zulkiffli	21	21
(South Korea) Shin K-d	4	5
(Japan) R Takeshita	21	21
Q6	(South Korea) Joo M-g	10	17

Second Round
4	(South Korea) Lee D-k	21	20	21
(China) Guo K	16	22	12
9	(Malaysia) Zf Zulkiffli	21	21
(Japan) R Takeshita	15	10

Third Round
4	(South Korea) Lee D-k	21	21
9	(Malaysia) Zf Zulkiffli	13	8

==== Section 4 ====
First Round
8	(Indonesia) J Christie	21	21
(South Korea) Kim D-r	15	15
(South Korea) Kim S-m	21	22
Q3	(South Korea) Lee J-w	18	20
14	(Czech Republic) P Koukal	21	11	19
(Japan) H Shimono	12	21	21
(South Korea) Byun J-s	21	21
PFQ	(United States) E Lee	5	6

Second Round
8	(Indonesia) J Christie	21	21
(South Korea) Kim S-m	14	11
(Japan) H Shimono	21	19	21
(South Korea) Byun J-s	15	21	9

Third Round
8	(Indonesia) J Christie	19	21	21
(Japan) H Shimono	21	12	9

=== Bottom half ===
==== Section 5 ====
First Round
PFQ	(South Korea) Choi M-s	5	10
(China) Huang YX	21	21
(South Korea) Ko G-b	12	16
10	(Japan) K Sakai	21	21
(South Korea) Han S-y	9	8
(Indonesia) S D Kuncoro	21	21
Q8	(South Korea) Jung K-h	11	12
6	(South Korea) Jeon H-j	21	21

Second Round
(China) Huang YX	21	18	19
10	(Japan) K Sakai	17	21	21
(Indonesia) S D Kuncoro	21	18	10
6	(South Korea) Jeon H-j	14	21	21

Third Round
10	(Japan) K Sakai	22	10	18
6	(South Korea) Jeon H-j	20	21	21

==== Section 6 ====
First Round
(South Korea) Hong J-h	21	21
Q1	(South Korea) Na S-s	16	16
(Japan) K Nishimoto	21	21
PFQ	(South Korea) Jo G-a	10	10
(Indonesia) R A Megananda	21	21
(South Korea) Son S-h	17	16
(South Korea) Kim M-k	21	21
3	(Chinese Taipei) Hsu J-h	13	11

Second Round
(South Korea) Hong J-h	8	16
(Japan) K Nishimoto	21	21
(Indonesia) R A Megananda	21	21
(South Korea) Kim M-k	17	16

Third Round
(Japan) K Nishimoto	21	21
(Indonesia) R A Megananda	11	8

==== Section 7 ====
First Round
(Japan) Y Yamaguchi	21	21
Q4	(South Korea) Park J-h	9	19
(South Korea) Lee H-j	13	12
15	(Malaysia) I Z Zainuddin	21	21
(Chinese Taipei) Yang Y-h	21	21
(South Korea) Joo H-j	15	9
(South Korea) Heo K-h	21	21
7	(Indonesia) I M Mustofa	18	13

Second Round
(Japan) Y Yamaguchi	8	21	21
15	(Malaysia) I Z Zainuddin	21	19	16
(Chinese Taipei) Yang Y-h	5	8
(South Korea) Heo K-h	21	21

Third Round
(Japan) Y Yamaguchi	16	16
(South Korea) Heo K-h	21	21

==== Section 8 ====
First Round
(China) Shi YQ	21	21
(South Korea) Yim J-w	13	12
(Malaysia) Goh S H	20	19
12	(Poland) A Dziolko	22	21
(South Korea) Yoon J-h	14	14
Q2	(South Korea) Kim Y-m	21	21
(Chinese Taipei) Liu W-c	19	7
2	(South Korea) Lee H-i	21	21

Second Round
(China) Shi YQ	21	21
12	(Poland) A Dziolko	14	12
Q2	(South Korea) Kim Y-m	8	10
2	(South Korea) Lee H-i	21	21

Third Round
(China) Shi YQ	18	21	9
2	(South Korea) Lee H-i	21	17	21

== Women's singles ==
=== Seeds ===
1. (South Korea) Sung Ji-hyun (first round)
2. (China) Sun Yu (final)
3. (South Korea) Bae Yeon-ju (semifinals)
4. (Japan) Sayaka Sato (champion)
5. (South Korea) Kim Hyo-min (second round)
6. (Japan) Kaori Imabeppu (quarterfinals)
7. (Japan) Aya Ohori (first round)
8. (Chinese Taipei) Cheng Chi-ya (second round)

=== Finals ===
Semifinals
(China) Shen Yaying	12	15
4	(Japan) Sayaka Sato	21	21
3	(South Korea) Bae Yeon-ju	8	8
2	(China) Sun Yu	21	21

Final
4	(Japan) Sayaka Sato	22	21
2	(China) Sun Yu	20	19

=== Top half ===
==== Section 1 ====
First Round
1	(South Korea) Sung J-h	1^{r}
(Chinese Taipei) Chen H-h	1
(Vietnam) Le T H	11	17
(Australia) Wendy Chen H-y	21	21
7	(Japan) A Ohori	10	15
(China) Shen YY	21	21
(Chinese Taipei) Chiang M-h	21	21
(Slovakia) J Ciznarova	9	6

Second Round
(Chinese Taipei) Chen H-h	21	21
(Australia) Wendy Chen H-y	10	9
(China) Shen YY	21	21
(Chinese Taipei) Chiang M-h	18	14

Quarterfinals
(Chinese Taipei) Chen H-h	13	15
(China) Shen YY	21	21

==== Section 2 ====
First Round
4	(Japan) S Sato	21	20	22
(South Korea) Kim N-y	15	22	20
(Malaysia) Lim C S	14	19
Q2	(South Korea) Kim H-i	21	21
5	(South Korea) Kim H-m	21	21
(Chinese Taipei) Hung S-h	15	16
(Japan) K Ito	21	21
(Indonesia) D D Ayustine	9	18

Second Round
4	(Japan) S Sato	21	21
Q2	(South Korea) Kim H-i	14	17
5	(South Korea) Kim H-m	20	17
(Japan) K Ito	22	21

Quarterfinals
4	(Japan) S Sato	21	21
(Japan) K Ito	10	18

=== Bottom half ===
==== Section 3 ====
First Round
(Malaysia) Ho Y M	16	11
Q4	(South Korea) Kim G-e	21	21
Q1	(South Korea) Shon M-h	22	5	15
8	(Chinese Taipei) Cheng C-y	20	21	21
Q3	(South Korea) Han S-y	10	9
(Japan) A Mine	21	21
(Indonesia) Fitriani	9	12
3	(South Korea) Bae Y-j	21	21

Second Round
Q4	(South Korea) Kim G-e	21	21
8	(Chinese Taipei) Cheng C-y	17	17
(Japan) A Mine	12	9
3	(South Korea) Bae Y-j	21	21

Quarterfinals
Q4	(South Korea) Kim G-e	10	7
3	(South Korea) Bae Y-j	21	21

==== Section 4 ====
First Round
(South Korea) Lee J-m	21	21
(Chinese Taipei) Yu C-h	13	18
(Italy) J Cicognini	6	6
6	(Japan) K Imabeppu	21	21
(Malaysia) Lim Y F	19	16
(South Korea) Koh E-b	21	21
(Chinese Taipei) Lin Y-c	16	5
2	(China) Sun Y	21	21

Second Round
(South Korea) Lee J-m	18	19
6	(Japan) K Imabeppu	21	21
(South Korea) Koh E-b	15	7
2	(China) Sun Y	21	21

Quarterfinals
6	(Japan) K Imabeppu	17	13
2	(China) Sun Y	21	21

== Men's doubles ==
=== Seeds ===
1. (South Korea) Lee Yong-dae / Yoo Yeon-seong (quarterfinals)
2. (South Korea) Ko Sung-hyun / Shin Baek-cheol (final)
3. (South Korea) Kim Gi-jung / Kim Sa-rang (champion)
4. (China) Li Junhui / Liu Yuchen (semifinals)
5. (Indonesia) Wahyu Nayaka / Ade Yusuf (second round)
6. (Japan) Kenta Kazuno / Kazushi Yamada (quarterfinals)
7. (Indonesia) Marcus Fernaldi Gideon / Kevin Sanjaya Sukamuljo (second round)
8. (China) Wang Yilyu / Zhang Wen (quarterfinals)

=== Finals ===
Semifinals
(Chinese Taipei) Lee Jhe-huei (Chinese Taipei) Lee Yang	17	14
3	(South Korea) Kim Gi-jung (South Korea) Kim Sa-rang	21	21
4	(China) Li Junhui (China) Liu Yuchen	14	15
2	(South Korea) Ko Sung-hyun (South Korea) Shin Baek-cheol	21	21

Final
3	(South Korea) Kim Gi-jung (South Korea) Kim Sa-rang	16	21	21
2	(South Korea) Ko Sung-hyun (South Korea) Shin Baek-cheol	21	18	19

=== Top half ===
==== Section 1 ====
First Round
1	(South Korea) Lee Y-d (South Korea) Yoo Y-s	21	21
Q4	(Chinese Taipei) Liao K-h (Chinese Taipei) Lu C-p	14	14
(China) Huang KX (China) Wang SJ	21	21
(Malaysia) Low J S (Malaysia) Ong Y S	17	17
7	(Indonesia) M F Gideon (Indonesia) K S Sukamuljo	1
(South Korea) Chung E-js (South Korea) Kim D-y	0^{r}
(Japan) T Inoue (Japan) Y Kaneko	17	17
(Chinese Taipei) Lee J-h (Chinese Taipei) Lee Y	21	21

Second Round
1	(South Korea) Lee Y-d (South Korea) Yoo Y-s	25	21
(China) Huang KX (China) Wang SJ	23	19
7	(Indonesia) M F Gideon (Indonesia) K S Sukamuljo	19	19
(Chinese Taipei) Lee J-h (Chinese Taipei) Lee Y	21	21

Quarterfinals
1	(South Korea) Lee Y-d (South Korea) Yoo Y-s	11^{r}
(Chinese Taipei) Lee J-h (Chinese Taipei) Lee Y	10

==== Section 2 ====
First Round
3	(South Korea) Kim G-j (South Korea) Kim S-r	21	21
(Chinese Taipei) Lin Y-h (Chinese Taipei) Yang Y-h	12	13
(Hong Kong) Or C C (Hong Kong) Tang C M	15	21	21
Q2	(South Korea) Kim D-s (South Korea) Song C-y	21	16	15
8	(China) Wang YL (China) Zhang W	21	21
(Chinese Taipei) Huang P-j (Chinese Taipei) Tien T-c	18	19
(South Korea) Choi Y-w (South Korea) Kang J-w	21	21
Q3	(Netherlands) R Bosch (New Zealand) O Leydon-Davis	18	9

Second Round
3	(South Korea) Kim G-j (South Korea) Kim S-r	21	21
(Hong Kong) Or C C (Hong Kong) Tang C M	8	14
8	(China) Wang YL (China) Zhang W	17	21	21
(South Korea) Choi Y-w (South Korea) Kang J-w	21	11	10

Quarterfinals
3	(South Korea) Kim G-j (South Korea) Kim S-r	21	21
8	(China) Wang YL (China) Zhang W	18	16

=== Bottom half ===
==== Section 3 ====
First Round
(Hong Kong) Chan T K (Hong Kong) Law C H
(South Korea) Jun B-c (South Korea) Kim D-e	w/o
(Chinese Taipei) Chen H-l (Chinese Taipei) Wang C-l	15	13
6	(Japan) K Kazuno (Japan) K Yamada	21	21
(Indonesia) B Angriawan (Indonesia) R A Saputro	21	21
(South Korea) Han T-s (South Korea) Lee S-j	18	16
(Malaysia) Chooi K M (Malaysia) Ow Y H	11	16
4	(China) Li JH (China) Liu YC	21	21

Second Round
(Hong Kong) Chan T K (Hong Kong) Law C H	21	13	18
6	(Japan) K Kazuno (Japan) K Yamada	12	21	21
(Indonesia) B Angriawan (Indonesia) R A Saputro	11	21	13
4	(China) Li JH (China) Liu YC	21	17	21

Quarterfinals
6	(Japan) K Kazuno (Japan) K Yamada	15	16
4	(China) Li JH (China) Liu YC	21	21

==== Section 4 ====
First Round
(Chinese Taipei) Chang K-c (Chinese Taipei) Liang J-w	22	16	19
(South Korea) Choi S-g (South Korea) Kim J-h	20	21	21
Q1	(South Korea) Han Y-s (South Korea) Kim J-d	18	18
5	(Indonesia) W Nayaka (Indonesia) A Yusuf	21	21
(Japan) T Hoki (Japan) Y Kobayashi	19	17
PFQ	(South Korea) Jung J-w (South Korea) Kim D-j	21	21
(Chinese Taipei) Liu W-c (Chinese Taipei) Yang P-h	14	18
2	(South Korea) Ko S-h (South Korea) Shin B-c	21	21

Second Round
(South Korea) Choi S-g (South Korea) Kim J-h	19	21	21
5	(Indonesia) W Nayaka (Indonesia) A Yusuf	21	18	16
PFQ	(South Korea) Jung J-w (South Korea) Kim D-j	16	16
2	(South Korea) Ko S-h (South Korea) Shin B-c	21	21

Quarterfinals
(South Korea) Choi S-g (South Korea) Kim J-h	20	17
2	(South Korea) Ko S-h (South Korea) Shin B-c	22	21

== Women's doubles ==
=== Seeds ===
1. (Japan) Shizuka Matsuo / Mami Naito (first round)
2. (South Korea) Go Ah-ra / Yoo Hae-won (semifinals)
3. (Japan) Ayane Kurihara / Naru Shinoya (quarterfinals)
4. (South Korea) Chae Yoo-jung / Kim So-yeong (second round)
5. (South Korea) Chang Ye-na / Lee So-hee (champion)
6. (South Korea) Jung Kyung-eun / Shin Seung-chan (final)
7. (China) Huang Dongping / Ou Dongni (second round)
8. (Indonesia) Suci Rizky Andini / Suci Rizky Andini (second round)

=== Finals ===
Semifinals
6	(South Korea) Jung Kyung-eun (South Korea) Shin Seung-chan	19	21	21
(Japan) Yuki Fukushima (Japan) Sayaka Hirota	21	11	15
5	(South Korea) Chang Ye-na (South Korea) Lee So-hee	22	21
2	(South Korea) Go Ah-ra (South Korea) Yoo Hae-won	20	18

Final
6	(South Korea) Jung Kyung-eun (South Korea) Shin Seung-chan	7	21	19
5	(South Korea) Chang Ye-na (South Korea) Lee So-hee	21	16	21

=== Top half ===
==== Section 1 ====
First Round
1	(Japan) S Matsuo (Japan) M Naito	18	21	9
(Indonesia) D D Haris (Indonesia) R E Putri Sari	21	14	21
(Chinese Taipei) Chiang K-h (Chinese Taipei) Wu F-c	21	21
(South Korea) Cho Y-s (South Korea) Park S-e	12	14
6	(South Korea) Jung K-e (South Korea) Shin S-c	21	21
Q4	(South Korea) Kim C-m (South Korea) Lee B-r	4	7
Q3	(South Korea) Lee Y-n (South Korea) Park Y-s	12	15
(South Korea) Kim S-b (South Korea) Seong S-y	21	21

Second Round
(Indonesia) D D Haris (Indonesia) R E Putri Sari	21	21
(Chinese Taipei) Chiang K-h (Chinese Taipei) Wu F-c	18	18
6	(South Korea) Jung K-e (South Korea) Shin S-c	21	21
(South Korea) Kim S-b (South Korea) Seong S-y	8	10

Quarterfinals
(Indonesia) D D Haris (Indonesia) R E Putri Sari	19	17
6	(South Korea) Jung K-e (South Korea) Shin S-c	21	21

==== Section 2 ====
First Round
4	(South Korea) Chae Y-j (South Korea) Kim S-y	21	21
(Chinese Taipei) Hung S-h (Chinese Taipei) Lin Y-c	10	9
(Indonesia) A S Awanda (Indonesia) N K Mahadewi Istirani	21	17	21
(South Korea) Song K-b (South Korea) Yoon M-a	10	21	19
7	(China) Huang DP (China) Ou DN	21	21
(Chinese Taipei) Cheng C-y (Chinese Taipei) Cheng Y-c	12	8
(South Korea) Ji J-b (South Korea) Kim G-e	15	25	17
(Japan) Y Fukushima (Japan) S Hirota	21	23	21

Second Round
4	(South Korea) Chae Y-j (South Korea) Kim S-y	15	21	13
(Indonesia) A S Awanda (Indonesia) N K Mahadewi Istirani	21	13	21
7	(China) Huang DP (China) Ou DN	16	19
(Japan) Y Fukushima (Japan) S Hirota	21	21

Quarterfinals
(Indonesia) A S Awanda (Indonesia) N K Mahadewi Istirani	22	19	9
(Japan) Y Fukushima (Japan) S Hirota	20	21	21

=== Bottom half ===
==== Section 3 ====
First Round
(South Korea) Eom H-w (South Korea) Kim H-n	21	21
(Chinese Taipei) Lin W-c (Chinese Taipei) Lin X-m	13	7
Q2	(South Korea) Kim T-h (South Korea) Seo S-h	7	11
5	(South Korea) Chang Y-n (South Korea) Lee S-h	21	21
(Indonesia) G R Imawan (Indonesia) T R Nuraidah	21	21
(South Korea) Kim Y-y (South Korea) Ko J-h	6	7
(Chinese Taipei) Chang H-t (Chinese Taipei) Hu L-f	8	12
3	(Japan) A Kurihara (Japan) N Shinoya	21	21

Second Round
(South Korea) Eom H-w (South Korea) Kim H-n	9	12
5	(South Korea) Chang Y-n (South Korea) Lee S-h	21	21
(Indonesia) G R Imawan (Indonesia) T R Nuraidah	17	14
3	(Japan) A Kurihara (Japan) N Shinoya	21	21

Quarterfinals
5	(South Korea) Chang Y-n (South Korea) Lee S-h	21	14	21
3	(Japan) A Kurihara (Japan) N Shinoya	16	21	12

==== Section 4 ====
First Round
(South Korea) Kim H-j (South Korea) Park K-h	21	21
(Chinese Taipei) Chen H-h (Chinese Taipei) Huang M-c	16	19
(South Korea) Kim H-r (South Korea) Kong H-y	16	21	16
8	(Indonesia) S R Andini (Indonesia) M D Giovani	21	17	21
(Japan) S Tanaka (Japan) K Yonemoto	21	21
(Vietnam) Le T H (Vietnam) Pham N T	15	12
Q1	(South Korea) Kim M-j (South Korea) Kim Y-j	11	8
2	(South Korea) Go A-r (South Korea) Yoo H-w	21	21

Second Round
(South Korea) Kim H-j (South Korea) Park K-h	21	21
8	(Indonesia) S R Andini (Indonesia) M D Giovani	13	15
(Japan) S Tanaka (Japan) K Yonemoto	21	5	19
2	(South Korea) Go A-r (South Korea) Yoo H-w	17	21	21

Quarterfinals
(South Korea) Kim H-j (South Korea) Park K-h	16	13
2	(South Korea) Go A-r (South Korea) Yoo H-w	21	21

== Mixed doubles ==
=== Seeds ===
1. (South Korea) Ko Sung-hyun / Kim Ha-na (champion)
2. (Russia) Evgenij Dremin / Evgenia Dimova (first round)
3. (Indonesia) Ronald Alexander / Melati Daeva Oktaviani (second round)
4. (China) Huang Kaixiang / Huang Dongping (second round)
5. (South Korea) Shin Baek-cheol / Chae Yoo-jung (final)
6. (South Korea) Choi Sol-gyu / Eom Hye-won (semifinals)
7. (Indonesia) Alfian Eko Prasetya / Annisa Saufika (first round)
8. (Chinese Taipei) Chen Hung-ling / Hu Ling-fang (first round)

=== Finals ===
Semifinals
1	(South Korea) Ko Sung-hyun (South Korea) Kim Ha-na	21	21
6	(South Korea) Choi Sol-gyu (South Korea) Eom Hye-won	18	12
(South Korea) Kim Gi-jung (South Korea) Shin Seung-chan	18	17
5	(South Korea) Shin Baek-cheol (South Korea) Chae Yoo-jung	21	21

Final
1	(South Korea) Ko Sung-hyun (South Korea) Kim Ha-na	19	21	21
5	(South Korea) Shin Baek-cheol (South Korea) Chae Yoo-jung	21	17	19

=== Top half ===
==== Section 1 ====
First Round
1	(South Korea) Ko S-h (South Korea) Kim H-n	21	21
Q1	(Chinese Taipei) Liu W-c (Chinese Taipei) Huang M-c	10	11
Q2	(Japan) Y Kaneko (Japan) S Matsuo	21	21
(Chinese Taipei) Tien T-c (Chinese Taipei) Wu F-c	12	9
8	(Chinese Taipei) Chen H-l (Chinese Taipei) Hu L-f	21	23	11
(Japan) A Koga (Japan) K Yonemoto	18	25	21
(South Korea) Kim J-h (South Korea) Kim S-y	21	24
(Vietnam) Do T D (Vietnam) Pham N T	9	22

Second Round
1	(South Korea) Ko S-h (South Korea) Kim H-n	21	21
Q2	(Japan) Y Kaneko (Japan) S Matsuo	10	15
(Japan) A Koga (Japan) K Yonemoto	21	21
(South Korea) Kim J-h (South Korea) Kim S-y	17	18

Quarterfinals
1	(South Korea) Ko S-h (South Korea) Kim H-n	21	21
(Japan) A Koga (Japan) K Yonemoto	15	19

==== Section 2 ====
First Round
3	(Indonesia) R Alexander (Indonesia) M D Oktaviani	18	21	21
(Chinese Taipei) Huang P-j (Chinese Taipei) Chiang K-h	21	12	14
(Malaysia) Tan K M (Malaysia) Lai P J	21	20	15
(South Korea) Kim D-y (South Korea) Go A-r	16	22	21
6	(South Korea) Choi S-g (South Korea) Eom H-w	21	23
(China) Liu YC (China) Ou DN	17	21
(Chinese Taipei) Yang P-h (Chinese Taipei) Chen H-h	21	21
(Netherlands) R Bosch (Chinese Taipei) Lin W-c	17	14

Second Round
3	(Indonesia) R Alexander (Indonesia) M D Oktaviani	19	15
(South Korea) Kim D-y (South Korea) Go A-r	21	21
6	(South Korea) Choi S-g (South Korea) Eom H-w	21	21
(Chinese Taipei) Yang P-h (Chinese Taipei) Chen H-h	9	14

Quarterfinals
(South Korea) Kim D-y (South Korea) Go A-r	16	10
6	(South Korea) Choi S-g (South Korea) Eom H-w	21	21

=== Bottom half ===
==== Section 3 ====
First Round
(South Korea) Kim G-j (South Korea) Shin S-c	21	21
(Chinese Taipei) Lee C-h (Chinese Taipei) Cheng C-y	10	14
Q3	(Japan) Y Kobayashi (Japan) Y Fukushima	19	21	21
7	(Indonesia) A E Prasetya (Indonesia) A Saufika	21	13	12
(Japan) K Kazuno (Japan) A Kurihara	4
(South Korea) Chung E-s (South Korea) Kong H-y	3^{r}
(Chinese Taipei) Wang C-l (Chinese Taipei) Yu C-h	13	12
4	(China) Huang KX (China) Huang DP	21	21

Second Round
(South Korea) Kim G-j (South Korea) Shin S-c	21	21
Q3	(Japan) Y Kobayashi (Japan) Y Fukushima	18	15
(Japan) K Kazuno (Japan) A Kurihara	21	13	21
4	(China) Huang KX (China) Huang DP	10	21	12

Quarterfinals
(South Korea) Kim G-j (South Korea) Shin S-c	25	21
(Japan) K Kazuno (Japan) A Kurihara	23	13

==== Section 4 ====
First Round
(Chinese Taipei) Chang K-c (Chinese Taipei) Chang H-t	21	21
(New Zealand) O Leydon-Davis (Chinese Taipei) Lin X-m	19	16
(Indonesia) H Faisal (Indonesia) S D Aulia	14	21	15
5	(South Korea) Shin B-c (South Korea) Chae Y-j	21	17	21
Q4	(South Korea) Kim D-j (South Korea) Kim C-m	17	21	21
(Chinese Taipei) Liang J-w (Chinese Taipei) Cheng Y-c	21	19	16
(South Korea) Kim D-e (South Korea) Yoo H-w	21	19	21
2	(Russia) E Dremin (Russia) E Dimova	14	21	14

Second Round
(Chinese Taipei) Chang K-c (Chinese Taipei) Chang H-t	13	16
5	(South Korea) Shin B-c (South Korea) Chae Y-j	21	21
Q4	(South Korea) Kim D-j (South Korea) Kim C-m	12	18
(South Korea) Kim D-e (South Korea) Yoo H-w	21	21

Quarterfinals
5	(South Korea) Shin B-c (South Korea) Chae Y-j	16	21	21
(South Korea) Kim D-e (South Korea) Yoo H-w	21	11	18

Preceded by 2015 Bitburger Open Grand Prix Gold	BWF Grand Prix and Grand Prix Gold; 2015 BWF Season	Succeeded by 2015 Scottish Open Grand Prix
