= 2015 Hong Kong Super Series =

2015 Hong Kong Open Super Series
Tournament details
- Dates: 17 November 2015 – 22 November 2015
- Level: Super Series
- Total prize money: US$350,000
- Venue: Hong Kong Coliseum
- Location: Kowloon, Hong Kong

Champions
- Men's singles: (Malaysia) Lee Chong Wei
- Women's singles: (Spain) Carolina Marín
- Men's doubles: (South Korea) Lee Yong-dae (South Korea) Yoo Yeon-seong
- Women's doubles: (China) Tian Qing (China) Zhao Yunlei
- Mixed doubles: (China) Zhang Nan (China) Zhao Yunlei

The 2015 Hong Kong Open Super Series was the twelfth Superseries tournament of the 2015 BWF Super Series. The tournament was contested in Kowloon, Hong Kong from November 17–22, 2015 with a total purse of $350,000. A qualification will occur to fill four places in all five disciplines of the main draws.

== Men's singles ==
=== Seeds ===
1. (China) Chen Long (quarterfinals)
2. (Denmark) Jan Ø. Jørgensen (first round)
3. (China) Lin Dan (second round)
4. (Japan) Kento Momota (second round)
5. (Chinese Taipei) Chou Tien-chen (quarterfinals)
6. (India) Srikanth Kidambi (first round)
7. (Denmark) Viktor Axelsen (first round)
8. (Indonesia) Tommy Sugiarto (first round)

=== Top half ===
First Round
1	(China) Chen L	21	21
(India) A Jayaram	17	12
(Thailand) B Ponsana	21	21
(Japan) S Sasaki	12	12
8	(Indonesia) T Sugiarto	16	15
(Malaysia) Lee C W	21	21
(Germany) M Zwiebler	21	21
(France) B Leverdez	17	19
3	(China) Lin D	21	15	21
PFQ	(Indonesia) I M Mustofa	17	21	14
(Hong Kong) Ng K L	21	21
(Chinese Taipei) Hsu J-h	14	17
5	(Chinese Taipei) Chou T-c	21	10	22
(Hong Kong) Wong W K	19	21	20
Q2	(Japan) K Nishimoto	21	18	21
(India) H. S. Prannoy	15	21	6

Second Round
1	(China) Chen L	19	21	21
(Thailand) B Ponsana	21	8	13
(Malaysia) Lee C W	21	21
(Germany) M Zwiebler	12	12
3	(China) Lin D	8	18
(Hong Kong) Ng K L	21	21
5	(Chinese Taipei) Chou T-c	21	24
Q2	(Japan) K Nishimoto	13	22

Quarterfinals
1	(China) Chen L	21	19	15
(Malaysia) Lee C W	13	21	21
(Hong Kong) Ng K L	21	15	21
5	(Chinese Taipei) Chou T-c	17	21	15

Semifinals
(Malaysia) Lee C W	21	21
(Hong Kong) Ng K L	19	14

=== Bottom half ===
First Round
(South Korea) Lee D-k	21	15	21
(Japan) T Ueda	13	21	10
Q3	(Japan) K Sakai	21	21
7	(Denmark) V Axelsen	17	10
(Hong Kong) Wei N	18	21	19
Q4	(Indonesia) A S Ginting	21	17	21
(China) Xue S	21	15	17
4	(Japan) K Momota	17	21	21
Q1	(Japan) K Tago	18	21	10
(South Korea) Son W-h	21	6	21
(China) Tian HW	21	15	24
6	(India) K. Srikanth	16	21	22
PFQ	(Malaysia) Chong W F	21	12	21
(Hong Kong) Hu Y	17	21	15
(China) Wang ZM	21	21
2	(Denmark) J Ø Jørgensen	15	19

Second Round
(South Korea) Lee D-k	14	6
Q3	(Japan) K Sakai	21	21
Q4	(Indonesia) A S Ginting	21	21
4	(Japan) K Momota	7	15
(South Korea) Son W-h	13	17
(China) Tian HW	21	21
PFQ	(Malaysia) Chong W F	12	14
(China) Wang ZM	21	21

Quarterfinals
Q3	(Japan) K Sakai	14	14
Q4	(Indonesia) A S Ginting	21	21
(China) Tian HW	21	21
(China) Wang ZM	15	11

Semifinals
Q4	(Indonesia) A S Ginting	21	11	6
(China) Tian HW	18	21	21

=== Finals ===
Semifinals
(Malaysia) Lee Chong Wei	21	21
(Hong Kong) Ng Ka Long	19	14
Q4	(Indonesia) Anthony Sinisuka Ginting	21	11	6
(China) Tian Houwei	18	21	21

Final
(Malaysia) Lee Chong Wei	21	21
(China) Tian Houwei	16	15

== Women's singles ==
=== Seeds ===
1. (Spain) Carolina Marin (champion)
2. (India) Saina Nehwal (withdrawn)
3. (South Korea) Sung Ji-hyun (quarterfinals)
4. (Chinese Taipei) Tai Tzu-ying (quarterfinals)
5. (China) Li Xuerui (first round)
6. (China) Wang Shixian (withdrawn)
7. (Thailand) Ratchanok Intanon (semifinals)
8. (China) Wang Yihan (semifinals)

=== Top half ===
First Round
1	(Spain) C Marín	21	21
(India) P.V. Sindhu	17	9
(Thailand) B Ongbumrungpan	19	21	18
(Japan) A Yamaguchi	21	10	21
PFQ	(Japan) A Ohori	19	21	12
(Thailand) P Buranaprasertsuk	21	17	21
PFQ	(Egypt) H Hosny	9	13
Q1	(Hong Kong) Tsang W C	21	21
3	(South Korea) Sung J-h	18	21	21
(Chinese Taipei) Pai Y-p	21	7	16
(Japan) Y Hashimoto	21	7	16
(Indonesia) M F Kusumastuti	13	21	21
8	(China) Wang YH	21	21
(Canada) M Li	14	6
(Chinese Taipei) Hsu Y-c	10	10
(Hong Kong) Cheung N Y	21	21

Second Round
1	(Spain) C Marín	21	21
(Japan) A Yamaguchi	19	8
(Thailand) P Buranaprasertsuk	21	21
Q1	(Hong Kong) Tsang W C	10	15
3	(South Korea) Sung J-h	21	21
(Indonesia) M F Kusumastuti	15	11
8	(China) Wang YH	21	21
(Hong Kong) Cheung N Y	13	5

Quarterfinals
1	(Spain) C Marín	21	21
(Thailand) P Buranaprasertsuk	12	13
3	(South Korea) Sung J-h	14	7
8	(China) Wang YH	21	21

Semifinals
1	(Spain) C Marín	21	21
8	(China) Wang YH	18	16

=== Bottom half ===
First Round
Q2	(Chinese Taipei) Chen H-h	21	21
Q3	(Hong Kong) Yeung S Y	16	10
(Japan) N Okuhara	21	21
5	(China) Li XR	19	9
(Japan) K Imabeppu	21	21
(United States) I Wang	16	12
(South Korea) Bae-Y-j	18	10
4	(Chinese Taipei) Tai T-y	21	21
(Indonesia) L Fanetri	11	21	14
(Japan) M Mitani	21	18	21
Q4	(Hong Kong) Cheung Y M	8	9
7	(Thailand) R Intanon	21	21
(United States) R Schafer	15	13
(Japan) S Sato	21	21
(Hong Kong) Yip P Y	21	21
PFQ	(Malaysia) Tee J Y	14	19

Second Round
Q2	(Chinese Taipei) Chen H-h	6	6
(Japan) N Okuhara	21	21
(Japan) K Imabeppu	9	22
4	(Chinese Taipei) Tai T-y	21	24
(Japan) M Mitani	22	9	12
7	(Thailand) R Intanon	20	21	21
(Japan) S Sato	21	21
(Hong Kong) Yip P Y	16	11

Quarterfinals
(Japan) N Okuhara	21	21
4	(Chinese Taipei) Tai T-y	13	13
7	(Thailand) R Intanon	21	21
(Japan) S Sato	19	11

Semifinals
(Japan) N Okuhara	26	21
7	(Thailand) R Intanon	24	6

=== Finals ===
Semifinals
1	(Spain) Carolina Marín	21	21
8	(China) Wang Yihan	18	16
(Japan) Nozomi Okuhara	26	21
7	(Thailand) Ratchanok Intanon	24	6

Final
1	(Spain) Carolina Marín	21	18	22
(Japan) Nozomi Okuhara	17	21	20

== Men's doubles ==
=== Seeds ===
1. (South Korea) Lee Yong-dae / Yoo Yeon-seong (champion)
2. (Indonesia) Mohammad Ahsan / Hendra Setiawan (semifinals)
3. (Denmark) Mathias Boe / Carsten Mogensen (final)
4. (China) Fu Haifeng / Zhang Nan (withdrawn)
5. (Japan) Hiroyuki Endo / Kenichi Hayakawa (first round)
6. (China) Chai Biao / Hong Wei (semifinals)
7. (China) Liu Xiaolong / Qiu Zihan (first round)
8. (Chinese Taipei) Lee Sheng-mu / Tsai Chia-hsin (first round)

=== Top half ===
First Round
1	(South Korea) Lee Y-d (South Korea) Yoo Y-s	21	21
(China) Cai Y (China) Lu K	13	14
Q2	(Hong Kong) Chung Y (Hong Kong) Li K H	11	10
(Denmark) K Astrup (Denmark) A S Rasmussen	21	21
7	(China) Liu XL (China) Qiu ZH	19	23	8
(Indonesia) M F Gideon (Indonesia) K S Sukamuljo	21	21	21
PFQ	(Thailand) B Issara (Thailand) N Puangpuapech	21	23
Q1	(Hong Kong) Chan T K (Hong Kong) Law C H	12	21
PFQ	(Chinese Taipei) Huang P-j (Chinese Taipei) Tien T-c	21	20	11
(South Korea) Ko S-h (South Korea) Shin B-c	16	22	21
(Malaysia) Goh V S (Malaysia) Tan W K	21	21
(Chinese Taipei) Lin C-y (Chinese Taipei) Wu H-l	18	11
6	(China) Chai B (China) Hong W	21	21
(Denmark) M Conrad-Petersen (Denmark) M Pieler Kolding	17	10
(Chinese Taipei) Liao M-c (Chinese Taipei) Tseng M-h	15	18
(Malaysia) Koo K K (Malaysia) Tan B H	21	21

Second Round
1	(South Korea) Lee Y-d (South Korea) Yoo Y-s	21	21
(Denmark) K Astrup (Denmark) A S Rasmussen	9	13
(Indonesia) M F Gideon (Indonesia) K S Sukamuljo	21	21
PFQ	(Thailand) B Issara (Thailand) N Puangpuapech	15	15
(South Korea) Ko S-h (South Korea) Shin B-c	20	18
(Malaysia) Goh V S (Malaysia) Tan W K	22	21
6	(China) Chai B (China) Hong W	21	21	21
(Malaysia) Koo K K (Malaysia) Tan B H	17	23	16

Quarterfinals
1	(South Korea) Lee Y-d (South Korea) Yoo Y-s	21	21
(Indonesia) M F Gideon (Indonesia) K S Sukamuljo	16	11
(Malaysia) Goh V S (Malaysia) Tan W K	15	12
6	(China) Chai B (China) Hong W	21	21

Semifinals
1	(South Korea) Lee Y-d (South Korea) Yoo Y-s	22	21	30
6	(China) Chai B (China) Hong W	24	11	28

=== Bottom half ===
First Round
(Indonesia) A Pratama (Indonesia) R K Suwardi	22	21
(Japan) T Kamura (Japan) K Sonoda	20	19
(Chinese Taipei) Chen H-l (Chinese Taipei) Wang C-l	11	21	21
5	(Japan) H Endo (Japan) K Hayakawa	21	16	16
(Japan) K Kazuno (Japan) K Yamada	23	21
(Indonesia) W Nayaka (Indonesia) A Yusuf	21	18
(Russia) V Ivanov (Russia) I Sozonov	12	17
3	(Denmark) M Boe (Denmark) C Mogensen	21	21
Q4	(Hong Kong) Chan D L (Hong Kong) Ho W L	14	10
(South Korea) Kim G-j (South Korea) Kim S-r	21	21
Q3	(Hong Kong) Or C C (Hong Kong) Tang C M	21	21
8	(Chinese Taipei) Lee S-m (Chinese Taipei) Tsai C-h	16	19
(China) Wang YL (China) Zhang W	21	21
(Malaysia) Hoon T H (Malaysia) Lim K W	18	17
(Japan) H Hashimoto (Japan) N Hirata	17	16
2	(Indonesia) M Ahsan (Indonesia) H Setiawan	21	21

Second Round
(Indonesia) A Pratama (Indonesia) R K Suwardi	21	18	21
(Chinese Taipei) Chen H-l (Chinese Taipei) Wang C-l	19	21	15
(Japan) K Kazuno (Japan) K Yamada	11	17
3	(Denmark) M Boe (Denmark) C Mogensen	21	21
(South Korea) Kim G-j (South Korea) Kim S-r	21	21
Q3	(Hong Kong) Or C C (Hong Kong) Tang C M	19	17
(China) Wang YL (China) Zhang W	16	19
2	(Indonesia) M Ahsan (Indonesia) H Setiawan	21	21

Quarterfinals
(Indonesia) A Pratama (Indonesia) R K Suwardi	22	12	14
3	(Denmark) M Boe (Denmark) C Mogensen	20	21	21
(South Korea) Kim G-j (South Korea) Kim S-r	20	19
2	(Indonesia) M Ahsan (Indonesia) H Setiawan	22	21

Semifinals
3	(Denmark) M Boe (Denmark) C Mogensen	14	21	21
2	(Indonesia) M Ahsan (Indonesia) H Setiawan	21	12	16

=== Finals ===
Semifinals
1	(South Korea) Lee Yong-dae (South Korea) Yoo Yeon-seong	22	21	30
6	(China) Chai Biao (China) Hong Wei	24	11	28
3	(Denmark) Mathias Boe (Denmark) Carsten Mogensen	14	21	21
2	(Indonesia) Mohammad Ahsan (Indonesia) Hendra Setiawan	21	12	16

Final
1	(South Korea) Lee Yong-dae (South Korea) Yoo Yeon-seong	21	18	21
3	(Denmark) Mathias Boe (Denmark) Carsten Mogensen	7	21	18

== Women's doubles ==
=== Seeds ===
1. (Japan) Misaki Matsutomo / Ayaka Takahashi (quarterfinals)
2. (China) Luo Ying / Luo Yu (second round)
3. (Denmark) Christinna Pedersen / Kamilla Rytter Juhl (quarterfinals)
4. (Indonesia) Nitya Krishinda Maheswari / Greysia Polii (semifinals)
5. (China) Tian Qing / Zhao Yunlei (champion)
6. (South Korea) Chang Ye-na / Lee So-hee (quarterfinals)
7. (Japan) Reika Kakiiwa / Miyuki Maeda (first round)
8. (South Korea) Jung Kyung-eun / Shin Seung-chan (second round)

=== Top half ===
First Round
1	(Japan) M Matsutomo (Japan) A Takahashi	21	21
PFQ	(Hong Kong) Chan H Y (Hong Kong) Ng W Y	14	4
(Indonesia) A S Awanda (Indonesia) N K M Istirani	20	21	20
(China) Tang JH (China) Zhong QX	22	12	22
8	(South Korea) Jung K-e (South Korea) Shin S-c	21	21
(India) J Gutta (India) A Ponnappa	12	15
PFQ	(Hong Kong) Chan T K (Hong Kong) Yuen S Y	14	21	13
(Japan) N Fukuman (Japan) K Yonao	21	16	21
3	(Denmark) C Pedersen (Denmark) K Rytter Juhl	21	21
(Thailand) J Kittiharakul (Thailand) R Prajongjai	15	12
(Indonesia) G R Imawan (Indonesia) T R Nuraidah	21	21
(United States) E Lee (United States) P L Obanana	12	14
5	(China) Tian Q (China) Zhao YL	21	21
(Indonesia) K N Hanadia (Indonesia) D T Permatasari	10	5
Q2	(Chinese Taipei) Chen H-h (Chinese Taipei) Huang M-c	8	21	8
(Japan) S Matuso (Japan) M Naito	21	19	21

Second Round
1	(Japan) M Matsutomo (Japan) A Takahashi	21	21	21
(China) Tang JH (China) Zhong QX	23	10	12
8	(South Korea) Jung K-e (South Korea) Shin S-c	21	18	16
(Japan) N Fukuman (Japan) K Yonao	14	21	21
3	(Denmark) C Pedersen (Denmark) K Rytter Juhl	21	21
(Indonesia) G R Imawan (Indonesia) T R Nuraidah	14	13
5	(China) Tian Q (China) Zhao YL	21	21
(Japan) S Matuso (Japan) M Naito	11	16

Quarterfinals
1	(Japan) M Matsutomo (Japan) A Takahashi	21	21	13
(Japan) N Fukuman (Japan) K Yonao	23	17	21
3	(Denmark) C Pedersen (Denmark) K Rytter Juhl	15	23	11
5	(China) Tian Q (China) Zhao YL	21	21	21

Semifinals
(Japan) N Fukuman (Japan) K Yonao	16	15
5	(China) Tian Q (China) Zhao YL	21	21

=== Bottom half ===
First Round
(Thailand) C Chaladchalam (Thailand) P Muenwong	13	19
(South Korea) Chae Y-j (South Korea) Kim S-y	21	21
Q1	(Hong Kong) Cheung Y M (Hong Kong) Tsang W C	5
7	(Japan) R Kakiiwa (Japan) M Maeda	3^{r}
(Indonesia) S R Andini (Indonesia) M D Giovani	10	22	12
(Japan) A Kurihara (Japan) N Shinoya	21	20	21
Q3	(Hong Kong) Ng T Y (Hong Kong) Yeung N T	12	14
4	(Indonesia) N K Maheswari (Indonesia) G Polii	21	21
(Netherlands) E Muskens (Netherlands) S Piek	9	21	21
(Chinese Taipei) Hsu Y-c (Chinese Taipei) Pai Y-p	21	10	17
(Hong Kong) Poon L Y (Hong Kong) Tse Y S	7	13
6	(South Korea) Chang Y-n (South Korea) Lee S-h	21	21
(Chinese Taipei) Chiang K-h (Chinese Taipei) Wu F-c	11	12
Q4	(China) Tang YT (China) Yu Y	21	21
(South Korea) Go A-r (South Korea) Yoo H-w	18	14
2	(China) Luo Y (China) Luo Y	21	21

Second Round
(South Korea) Chae Y-j (South Korea) Kim S-y	21	21
Q1	(Hong Kong) Cheung Y M (Hong Kong) Tsang W C	11	6
(Japan) A Kurihara (Japan) N Shinoya	11	16
4	(Indonesia) N K Maheswari (Indonesia) G Polii	21	21
(Netherlands) E Muskens (Netherlands) S Piek	21	10	15
6	(South Korea) Chang Y-n (South Korea) Lee S-h	18	21	21
Q4	(China) Tang YT (China) Yu Y	22	21
2	(China) Luo Y (China) Luo Y	20	16

Quarterfinals
(South Korea) Chae Y-j (South Korea) Kim S-y	21	16	11
4	(Indonesia) N K Maheswari (Indonesia) G Polii	14	21	21
6	(South Korea) Chang Y-n (South Korea) Lee S-h	20	21	16
Q4	(China) Tang YT (China) Yu Y	22	17	21

Semifinals
4	(Indonesia) N K Maheswari (Indonesia) G Polii	20	11
Q4	(China) Tang YT (China) Yu Y	22	21

=== Finals ===
Semifinals
(Japan) Naoko Fukuman (Japan) Kurumi Yonao	16	15
5	(China) Tian Qing (China) Zhao Yunlei	21	21
4	(Indonesia) Nitya Krishinda Maheswari (Indonesia) Greysia Polii	20	11
Q4	(China) Tang Yuanting (China) Yu Yang	22	21

Final
5	(China) Tian Qing (China) Zhao Yunlei	21	21
Q4	(China) Tang Yuanting (China) Yu Yang	15	12

== Mixed doubles ==
=== Seeds ===
1. (China) Zhang Nan / Zhao Yunlei (champion)
2. (Indonesia) Tantowi Ahmad / Liliyana Natsir (withdrawn)
3. (China) Liu Cheng / Bao Yixin (final)
4. (China) Xu Chen / Ma Jin (quarterfinals)
5. (South Korea) Ko Sung-hyun / Kim Ha-na (quarterfinals)
6. (England) Chris Adcock / Gabrielle Adcock (first round)
7. (China) Lu Kai / Huang Yaqiong (first round)
8. (Indonesia) Praveen Jordan / Debby Susanto (quarterfinals)

=== Top half ===
First Round
1	(China) Zhang N (China) Zhao YL	21	21
(Thailand) S Prapakamol (Thailand) S Thoungthongkam	10	12
(Netherlands) J Arends (Netherlands) S Piek	21	21
Q3	(Thailand) P Thongnuam (Thailand) N Saengchote	10	13
8	(Indonesia) P Jordan (Indonesia) D Susanto	21	21
Q4	(Hong Kong) Or C C (Hong Kong) Chan T K	12	15
(Hong Kong) Lee C H (Hong Kong) Chau H W	21	21
(Chinese Taipei) Liao M-c (Chinese Taipei) Chen H-h	11	11
3	(China) Xu C (China) Ma J	21	21
(Hong Kong) Chan Y L (Hong Kong) Tse Y S	14	8
(Indonesia) E Subaktiar (Indonesia) G E Widjaja	21	21
PFQ	(Chinese Taipei) Tseng M-h (Chinese Taipei) Huang M-c	13	11
7	(China) Lu K (China) Huang YQ	21	18	16
(South Korea) Yoo Y-s (South Korea) Chang Y-n	17	21	21
(Russia) E Dremin (Russia) E Dimova	21	21
Q1	(Chinese Taipei) Wu H-l (Chinese Taipei) Hsieh P-c	18	19

Second Round
1	(China) Zhang N (China) Zhao YL	21	19	21
(Netherlands) J Arends (Netherlands) S Piek	19	21	11
8	(Indonesia) P Jordan (Indonesia) D Susanto	21	21
(Hong Kong) Lee C H (Hong Kong) Chau H W	18	18
3	(China) Xu C (China) Ma J	21	21
(Indonesia) E Subaktiar (Indonesia) G E Widjaja	14	11
(South Korea) Yoo Y-s (South Korea) Chang Y-n	21	21
(Russia) E Dremin (Russia) E Dimova	10	15

Quarterfinals
1	(China) Zhang N (China) Zhao YL	22	17	21
8	(Indonesia) P Jordan (Indonesia) D Susanto	20	21	19
3	(China) Xu C (China) Ma J	18	21	14
(South Korea) Yoo Y-s (South Korea) Chang Y-n	21	14	21

Semifinals
1	(China) Zhang N (China) Zhao YL	22	21
(South Korea) Yoo Y-s (South Korea) Chang Y-n	20	17

=== Bottom half ===
First Round
(Indonesia) R Alexander (Indonesia) M D Oktaviani	21	22
(South Korea) Lee Y-d (South Korea) Lee S-h	16	20
(Japan) K Sonoda (Japan) N Fukuman	18	21	11
5	(South Korea) Ko S-h (South Korea) Kim H-n	21	18	21
(Denmark) N Nohr (Denmark) S Thygesen	21	21
PFQ	(Egypt) A A El Khateeb (Egypt) D Hany	8	9
(South Korea) Choi S-g (South Korea) Eom H-w	19	14
3	(China) Liu C (China) Bao YX	21	21
(South Korea) Kim G-j (South Korea) Shin S-c	21	21
Q2	(Hong Kong) Law C H (Hong Kong) Yuen S Y	11	18
(South Korea) Shin B-c (South Korea) Chae Y-j	21	21
6	(England) C Adcock (England) G Adcock	9	15
(Hong Kong) Tang C M (Hong Kong) Poon L Y	21	21
(Japan) K Hayakawa (Japan) M Matsutomo	15	15
(Japan) K Kazuno (Japan) A Kurihara	21	21
PFQ	(Egypt) A Kashkal (Egypt) H Hosny	11	9

Second Round
(Indonesia) R Alexander (Indonesia) M D Oktaviani	21	18	12
5	(South Korea) Ko S-h (South Korea) Kim H-n	17	21	21
(Denmark) N Nohr (Denmark) S Thygesen	15	14
3	(China) Liu C (China) Bao YX	21	21
(South Korea) Kim G-j (South Korea) Shin S-c	13	20
(South Korea) Shin B-c (South Korea) Chae Y-j	21	22
(Hong Kong) Tang C M (Hong Kong) Poon L Y	17	14
(Japan) K Kazuno (Japan) A Kurihara	21	21

Quarterfinals
5	(South Korea) Ko S-h (South Korea) Kim H-n	8	18
3	(China) Liu C (China) Bao YX	21	21
(South Korea) Shin B-c (South Korea) Chae Y-j	14	21	21
(Japan) K Kazuno (Japan) A Kurihara	21	10	17

Semifinals
3	(China) Liu C (China) Bao YX	17	21	21
(South Korea) Shin B-c (South Korea) Chae Y-j	21	15	16

=== Finals ===
Semifinals
1	(China) Zhang Nan (China) Zhao Yunlei	22	21
(South Korea) Yoo Yeon-seong (South Korea) Chang Ye-na	20	17
3	(China) Liu Cheng (China) Bao Yixin	17	21	21
(South Korea) Shin Baek-cheol (South Korea) Chae Yoo-jung	21	15	16

Final
1	(China) Zhang Nan (China) Zhao Yunlei	21	17	21
3	(China) Liu Cheng (China) Bao Yixin	17	21	17

Preceded by 2014 Hong Kong Super Series	Hong Kong Open	Succeeded by 2016 Hong Kong Super Series
Preceded by 2015 China Open Super Series Premier	BWF Super Series; 2015 BWF Season	Succeeded by 2015 BWF Super Series Masters Finals
