= 2017 Korea Open Super Series =

Tournament details
- Dates: 12 – 17 September 2017
- Level: Super Series
- Total prize money: US$600,000
- Venue: SK Handball Stadium
- Location: Seoul, South Korea

Champions
- Men's singles: (Indonesia) Anthony Sinisuka Ginting
- Women's singles: (India) P. V. Sindhu
- Men's doubles: (Denmark) Mathias Boe (Denmark) Carsten Mogensen
- Women's doubles: (China) Huang Yaqiong (China) Yu Xiaohan
- Mixed doubles: (Indonesia) Praveen Jordan (Indonesia) Debby Susanto

The 2017 Korea Open Super Series was the seventh Super Series tournament of the 2017 BWF Super Series. The tournament took place at SK Handball Stadium in Seoul, South Korea from September 12 – 17, 2017 and had a total purse of $600,000.

== Men's singles ==
=== Seeds ===
1. (South Korea) Son Wan-ho (semifinals)
2. (Malaysia) Lee Chong Wei (withdrew)
3. (Denmark) Viktor Axelsen (withdrew)
4. (Chinese Taipei) Chou Tien-chen (first round)
5. (India) Srikanth Kidambi (withdrew)
6. (Hong Kong) Ng Ka Long (second round)
7. (Chinese Taipei) Wang Tzu-wei (semifinals)
8. (Thailand) Tanongsak Saensomboonsuk (first round)

=== Top half ===
First round
1	(South Korea) Son W-h	21	21
(China) Huang YX	18	16
(Chinese Taipei) Hsu J-h	13	16
Q1	(India) K Parupalli	21	21
8	(Thailand) T Saensomboonsuk	13	23	9
(India) S Verma	21	21	21
(Hong Kong) Wong W K	22	21
(Indonesia) T Sugiarto	20	13
4	(Chinese Taipei) Chou T-c	21	14
(France) B Leverdez	23	21
(India) S Verma	21	13	19
Q2	(Japan) K Nishimoto	18	21	21
6	(Hong Kong) Ng K L	21	21	21
(India) H. S. Prannoy	17	23	14
Q3	(South Korea) Lee D-k	8	21	11
(Indonesia) A S Ginting	21	16	21

Second round
1	(South Korea) Son W-h	21	17	21
Q1	(India) K Parupalli	16	21	16
(India) S Verma	21	21
(Hong Kong) Wong W K	19	13
(France) B Leverdez	19	13
Q2	(Japan) K Nishimoto	21	21
6	(Hong Kong) Ng K L	18	18
(Indonesia) A S Ginting	21	21

Quarterfinals
1	(South Korea) Son W-h	20	21	21
(India) S Verma	22	10	13
Q2	(Japan) K Nishimoto	19	13
(Indonesia) A S Ginting	21	21

Semifinals
1	(South Korea) Son W-h	21	18	13
(Indonesia) A S Ginting	16	21	21

=== Bottom half ===
First round
(India) B. S Praneeth	21	21
(Hong Kong) Hu Y	15	10
(South Korea) Jeon H-j	14	25	12
7	(Chinese Taipei) Wang T-w	21	23	21
PFQ	(Malaysia) Chong W F	21	11	15
(Denmark) H-K Vittinghus	17	21	21
Q4	(Thailand) P Thongnuam	6	21	21
PFQ	(Hong Kong) Wei N	21	12	11
(South Korea) Lee H-i	16	23	12
(Indonesia) J Christie	21	21	21
PFQ	(Denmark) E Holst	21	15	15
PFQ	(Brazil) Y Coelho	15	21	21
(Japan) K Tsuneyama	13	21	18
(Denmark) A Antonsen	21	15	21
(China) Qiao B	17	21	13
PFQ	(Japan) K Sakai	21	18	21

Second round
(India) B. S Praneeth	13	24
7	(Chinese Taipei) Wang T-w	21	26
(Denmark) H-K Vittinghus	16	21	22
Q4	(Thailand) P Thongnuam	21	16	20
(Indonesia) J Christie	21	21
PFQ	(Brazil) Y Coelho	16	14
(Denmark) A Antonsen	21	16	6
PFQ	(Japan) K Sakai	9	21	21

Quarterfinals
7	(Chinese Taipei) Wang T-w	21	19	21
(Denmark) H-K Vittinghus	11	21	14
(Indonesia) J Christie	21	16	21
PFQ	(Japan) K Sakai	13	21	19

Semifinals
7	(Chinese Taipei) Wang T-w	13	17
(Indonesia) J Christie	21	21

=== Finals ===
Semifinals
1	(South Korea) Son Wan-ho	21	18	13
(Indonesia) Anthony Sinisuka Ginting	16	21	21
7	(Chinese Taipei) Wang Tzu-wei	13	17
(Indonesia) Jonatan Christie	21	21

Final
(Indonesia) Anthony Sinisuka Ginting	21	19	22
(Indonesia) Jonatan Christie	13	21	20

== Women's singles ==
=== Seeds ===
1. (Chinese Taipei) Tai Tzu-ying (second round)
2. (Japan) Akane Yamaguchi (semifinals)
3. (South Korea) Sung Ji-hyun (quarterfinals)
4. (Spain) Carolina Marín (withdrew)
5. (India) P. V. Sindhu (champion)
6. (China) He Bingjiao (semifinals)
7. (Thailand) Ratchanok Intanon (quarterfinals)
8. (Japan) Nozomi Okuhara (final)

=== Top half ===
First round
1	(Chinese Taipei) Tai T-y	21	21
(Japan) S Kawakami	19	16
(Scotland) K Gilmour	15	20
(Japan) M Mitani	21	22
5	(India) P. V. Sindhu	21	21
(Hong Kong) Cheung N Y	13	8
(Chinese Taipei) Chiang M-h	6	14
(Thailand) N Jindapol	21	21
3	(South Korea) Sung J-h	21	21
(Chinese Taipei) Lee C-h	9	12
PFQ	(South Korea) Kim H-m	21	23
(Denmark) L Kjaersfeldt	12	21
6	(China) He BJ	22	21
Q4	(Chinese Taipei) Chen S-y	20	12
(South Korea) Lee J-m	21	21
(Malaysia) Sonia Cheah S Y	17	18

Second round
1	(Chinese Taipei) Tai T-y	21	21	18
(Japan) M Mitani	23	14	21
5	(India) P. V. Sindhu	22	21
(Thailand) N Jindapol	20	17
3	(South Korea) Sung J-h	21	21
PFQ	(South Korea) Kim H-m	7	13
6	(China) He BJ	21	21
(South Korea) Lee J-m	17	16

Quarterfinals
(Japan) M Mitani	19	21	10
5	(India) P. V. Sindhu	21	16	21
3	(South Korea) Sung J-h	19	21	19
6	(China) He BJ	21	16	21

Semifinals
5	(India) P. V. Sindhu	21	17	21
6	(China) He BJ	10	21	16

=== Bottom half ===
First round
(Indonesia) Fitriani	11	7
(Japan) S Sato	21	21
(United States) B Zhang	19	17
8	(Japan) N Okuhara	21	21
Q1	(Indonesia) G M Tunjung	13	21	21
(Thailand) B Ongbamrungphan	21	9	15
Q3	(South Korea) Jeon J-i	21	11	17
PFQ	(Hong Kong) Yip P Y	15	21	21
Q2	(Canada) M Li	21	21
(Thailand) P Chochuwong	10	11
PFQ	(Denmark) N K Rohde	14	20
7	(Thailand) R Intanon	21	22
(China) Chen XX	21	21
(Japan) A Ohori	13	14
PFQ	(Russia) E Kosetskaya	18	15
2	(Japan) A Yamaguchi	21	21

Second round
(Japan) S Sato	16	13
8	(Japan) N Okuhara	21	21
Q1	(Indonesia) G M Tunjung	16	14
PFQ	(Hong Kong) Yip P Y	21	21
Q2	(Canada) M Li	6	16
7	(Thailand) R Intanon	21	21
(China) Chen XX	23	21	18
2	(Japan) A Yamaguchi	25	11	21

Quarterfinals
8	(Japan) N Okuhara	21	21
PFQ	(Hong Kong) Yip P Y	15	10
7	(Thailand) R Intanon	12	16
2	(Japan) A Yamaguchi	21	21

Semifinals
8	(Japan) N Okuhara	21	21
2	(Japan) A Yamaguchi	17	18

=== Finals ===
Semifinals
5	(India) P. V. Sindhu	21	17	21
6	(China) He Bingjiao	10	21	16
8	(Japan) Nozomi Okuhara	21	21
2	(Japan) Akane Yamaguchi	17	18

Final
5	(India) P. V. Sindhu	22	11	21
8	(Japan) Nozomi Okuhara	20	21	18

== Men's doubles ==
=== Seeds ===
1. (Denmark) Mathias Boe / Carsten Mogensen (champion)
2. (Indonesia) Marcus Fernaldi Gideon / Kevin Sanjaya Sukamuljo (final)
3. (Japan) Takeshi Kamura / Keigo Sonoda (semifinals)
4. (Malaysia) Goh V Shem / Tan Wee Kiong (withdrew)
5. (Denmark) Mads Conrad-Petersen / Mads Pieler Kolding (quarterfinals)
6. (China) Liu Cheng / Zhang Nan (quarterfinals)
7. (Chinese Taipei) Lee Jhe-huei / Lee Yang (second round)
8. (Chinese Taipei) Chen Hung-ling / Wang Chi-lin (second round)

=== Top half ===
First round
1	(Denmark) M Boe (Denmark) C Mogensen	21	21
(Indonesia) B Angriawan (Indonesia) Hardianto	17	17
(Germany) J R Jansen (Germany) J Zurwonne	21	21
Q3	(South Korea) Choi H-g (South Korea) Park K-h	17	14
5	(Denmark) M Conrad-Petersen (Denmark) M P Kolding	21	21
Q1	(South Korea) Lee S-m (South Korea) Na S-s	9	12
Q2	(South Korea) Chung E-s (South Korea) Kim D-y	21	21
(India) M Attri (India) B. S Reddy	11	10
PFQ	(Chinese Taipei) Liao M-c (Chinese Taipei) Su C-h	21	22	21
(Indonesia) F Alfian (Indonesia) M R Ardianto	19	24	15
Q4	(China) Han CK (China) Zhou HD	12	19
(Indonesia) H Setiawan (Malaysia) Tan B H	21	21
8	(Chinese Taipei) Chen H-l (Chinese Taipei) Wang C-l	21	21
(Hong Kong) Law C H (Hong Kong) Lee C H	15	15
(Japan) T Hoki (Japan) Y Kobayashi	20	21	22
(Malaysia) Lim K W (South Korea) Yoo Y-s	22	13	20

Second round
1	(Denmark) M Boe (Denmark) C Mogensen	21	21
(Germany) J R Jansen (Germany) J Zurwonne	16	14
5	(Denmark) M Conrad-Petersen (Denmark) M P Kolding	21	17	21
Q2	(South Korea) Chung E-s (South Korea) Kim D-y	15	21	17
PFQ	(Chinese Taipei) Liao M-c (Chinese Taipei) Su C-h	21	6	22
(Indonesia) H Setiawan (Malaysia) Tan B H	19	21	20
8	(Chinese Taipei) Chen H-l (Chinese Taipei) Wang C-l	15	16
(Japan) T Hoki (Japan) Y Kobayashi	21	21

Quarterfinals
1	(Denmark) M Boe (Denmark) C Mogensen	21	22
5	(Denmark) M Conrad-Petersen (Denmark) M P Kolding	19	20
PFQ	(Chinese Taipei) Liao M-c (Chinese Taipei) Su C-h	18	21	13
(Japan) T Hoki (Japan) Y Kobayashi	21	19	21

Semifinals
1	(Denmark) M Boe (Denmark) C Mogensen	17	21	21
(Japan) T Hoki (Japan) Y Kobayashi	21	16	17

=== Bottom half ===
First round
PFQ	(India) S Rankireddy (India) C Shetty	21	22	21
PFQ	(Chinese Taipei) Lee S-m (Chinese Taipei) Lin C-y	9	24	12
(Japan) T Inoue (Japan) Y Kaneko	21	21	17
7	(Chinese Taipei) Lee J-h (Chinese Taipei) Lee Y	23	18	21
PFQ	(Germany) M Lamsfuss (Germany) M E Seidel	11	21	13
(Denmark) K Astrup (Denmark) A S Rasmussen	21	19	21
(Thailand) B Isara (Thailand) N Phuangphuapet	14	17
3	(Japan) T Kamura (Japan) K Sonoda	21	21
(Chinese Taipei) Lu C-y (Chinese Taipei) Yang P-h	11	24	21
(Russia) V Ivanov (Russia) I Sozonov	21	22	14
(Thailand) K Kedren (Thailand) D Puavaranukroh	14	19
6	(China) Liu C (China) Zhang N	21	21
(England) M Ellis (England) C Langridge	14	20
(Malaysia) Ong Y S (Malaysia) Teo E Y	21	22
(Hong Kong) Or C C (Hong Kong) Tang C M	9	21	11
2	(Indonesia) M F Gideon (Indonesia) K S Sukamuljo	21	17	21

Second round
PFQ	(India) S Rankireddy (India) C Shetty	23	16	21
7	(Chinese Taipei) Lee J-h (Chinese Taipei) Lee Y	21	21	8
(Denmark) K Astrup (Denmark) A S Rasmussen	21	19	13
3	(Japan) T Kamura (Japan) K Sonoda	14	21	21
(Chinese Taipei) Lu C-y (Chinese Taipei) Yang P-h	13	11
6	(China) Liu C (China) Zhang N	21	21
(Malaysia) Ong Y S (Malaysia) Teo E Y	16	20
2	(Indonesia) M F Gideon (Indonesia) K S Sukamuljo	21	22

Quarterfinals
PFQ	(India) S Rankireddy (India) C Shetty	14	21	15
3	(Japan) T Kamura (Japan) K Sonoda	21	17	21
6	(China) Liu C (China) Zhang N	16	26
2	(Indonesia) M F Gideon (Indonesia) K S Sukamuljo	21	28

Semifinals
3	(Japan) T Kamura (Japan) K Sonoda	18	21	16
2	(Indonesia) M F Gideon (Indonesia) K S Sukamuljo	21	17	21

=== Finals ===
Semifinals
1	(Denmark) Mathias Boe (Denmark) Carsten Mogensen	17	21	21
(Japan) Takuro Hoki (Japan) Yugo Kobayashi	21	16	17
3	(Japan) Takeshi Kamura (Japan) Keigo Sonoda	18	21	16
2	(Indonesia) Marcus Fernaldi Gideon (Indonesia) Kevin Sanjaya Sukamuljo	21	17	21

Final
1	(Denmark) Mathias Boe (Denmark) Carsten Mogensen	21	19	21
2	(Indonesia) Marcus Fernaldi Gideon (Indonesia) Kevin Sanjaya Sukamuljo	19	21	15

== Women's doubles ==
=== Seeds ===
1. (Japan) Misaki Matsutomo / Ayaka Takahashi (semifinals)
2. (Denmark) Kamilla Rytter Juhl / Christinna Pedersen (semifinals)
3. (South Korea) Chang Ye-na / Lee So-hee (final)
4. (South Korea) Jung Kyung-eun / Shin Seung-chan (second round)
5. (China) Huang Dongping / Li Yinhui (withdrew)
6. (Japan) Shiho Tanaka / Koharu Yonemoto (second round)
7. (Japan) Yuki Fukushima / Sayaka Hirota (second round)
8. (Thailand) Puttita Supajirakul / Sapsiree Taerattanachai (withdrew)

=== Top half ===
First round
1	(Japan) M Matsutomo (Japan) A Takahashi	21	21
(Bulgaria) G Stoeva (Bulgaria) S Stoeva	11	10
(Thailand) C Chaladchalam (Thailand) P Muenwong	19	21	18
PFQ	(South Korea) Baek H-n (South Korea) Lee Y-r	21	12	21
7	(Japan) Y Fukushima (Japan) S Hirota	21	21
(Chinese Taipei) Cheng Y-c (Chinese Taipei) Hu L-f	13	15
(Thailand) J Kititharakul (Thailand) R Prajongjai	15	22
(Indonesia) G Polii (Indonesia) A Rahayu	21	24
4	(South Korea) Jung K-e (South Korea) Shin S-c	21	21
PFQ	(Germany) L Efler (Germany) E Janssens	9	10
(Chinese Taipei) Chiang K-h (Chinese Taipei) Hung S-h	13	12
(Japan) M Matsumoto (Japan) W Nagahara	21	21
PFQ	(Malaysia) Soong F C (Malaysia) Tee J Y	19	21	21
(India) A Ponnappa (India) N. S Reddy	21	13	17
(China) Huang YQ (China) Yu XH	21	21
(Denmark) M Fruergaard (Denmark) S Thygesen	12	17

Second round
1	(Japan) M Matsutomo (Japan) A Takahashi	21	21
PFQ	(South Korea) Baek H-n (South Korea) Lee Y-r	14	15
7	(Japan) Y Fukushima (Japan) S Hirota	21	17	13
(Indonesia) G Polii (Indonesia) A Rahayu	14	21	21
4	(South Korea) Jung K-e (South Korea) Shin S-c	21	20	14
(Japan) M Matsumoto (Japan) W Nagahara	14	22	21
PFQ	(Malaysia) Soong F C (Malaysia) Tee J Y	7	17
(China) Huang YQ (China) Yu XH	21	21

Quarterfinals
1	(Japan) M Matsutomo (Japan) A Takahashi	21	21
(Indonesia) G Polii (Indonesia) A Rahayu	15	13
(Japan) M Matsumoto (Japan) W Nagahara	17	24	15
(China) Huang YQ (China) Yu XH	21	22	21

Semifinals
1	(Japan) M Matsutomo (Japan) A Takahashi	19	12
(China) Huang YQ (China) Yu XH	21	21

=== Bottom half ===
First round
(Chinese Taipei) Hsu Y-c (Chinese Taipei) Wu T-j	12	13
(South Korea) Kim H-r (South Korea) Yoo H-w	21	21
(Chinese Taipei) Lin X-m (Chinese Taipei) Wu F-c	17	16
6	(Japan) S Tanaka (Japan) K Yonemoto	21	21
Q2	(South Korea) Kim M-j (South Korea) Seong A-y	21	21
Q3	(South Korea) Jeong N-e (South Korea) Park G-e	19	17
(Denmark) J Finne-Ipsen (Denmark) R Søby	16	12
3	(South Korea) Chang Y-n (South Korea) Lee S-h	21	21
(China) Du Y (China) Xu Y	21	21
Q4	(South Korea) Lee Y-n (South Korea) Sim Y-j	18	14
Q1	(South Korea) Kim H-n (South Korea) Kong H-y	21	21	21
PFQ	(Germany) I Herttrich (Germany) O Konon	23	16	8
PFQ	(Chinese Taipei) Chang C-h (Chinese Taipei) Yang C-t	10	14
(South Korea) Chae Y-j (South Korea) Kim S-y	21	21
(Hong Kong) Poon L Y (Hong Kong) Tse Y S	11	21	16
2	(Denmark) K Rytter Juhl (Denmark) C Pedersen	21	19	21

Second round
(South Korea) Kim H-r (South Korea) Yoo H-w	24	22
6	(Japan) S Tanaka (Japan) K Yonemoto	22	20
Q2	(South Korea) Kim M-j (South Korea) Seong A-y	17	12
3	(South Korea) Chang Y-n (South Korea) Lee S-h	21	21
(China) Du Y (China) Xu Y	21	21
Q1	(South Korea) Kim H-n (South Korea) Kong H-y	17	17
(South Korea) Chae Y-j (South Korea) Kim S-y	17	21	19
2	(Denmark) K Rytter Juhl (Denmark) C Pedersen	21	10	21

Quarterfinals
(South Korea) Kim H-r (South Korea) Yoo H-w	21	19	15
3	(South Korea) Chang Y-n (South Korea) Lee S-h	15	21	21
(China) Du Y (China) Xu Y	11	12
2	(Denmark) K Rytter Juhl (Denmark) C Pedersen	21	21

Semifinals
3	(South Korea) Chang Y-n (South Korea) Lee S-h	17	21	21
2	(Denmark) K Rytter Juhl (Denmark) C Pedersen	21	18	14

=== Finals ===
Semifinals
1	(Japan) Misaki Matsutomo (Japan) Ayaka Takahashi	19	12
(China) Huang Yaqiong (China) Yu Xiaohan	21	21
3	(South Korea) Chang Ye-na (South Korea) Lee So-hee	17	21	21
2	(Denmark) Kamilla Rytter Juhl (Denmark) Christinna Pedersen	21	18	14

Final
(China) Huang Yaqiong (China) Yu Xiaohan	21	21
3	(South Korea) Chang Ye-na (South Korea) Lee So-hee	11	15

== Mixed doubles ==
=== Seeds ===
1. (China) Zheng Siwei / Chen Qingchen (withdrew)
2. (England) Chris Adcock / Gabrielle Adcock (second round)
3. (Denmark) Joachim Fischer Nielsen / Christinna Pedersen (withdrew)
4. (Indonesia) Praveen Jordan / Debby Susanto (champion)
5. (Thailand) Dechapol Puavaranukroh / Sapsiree Taerattanachai (withdrew)
6. (Malaysia) Tan Kian Meng / Lai Pei Jing (second round)
7. (South Korea) Choi Sol-gyu / Chae Yoo-jung (first round)
8. (Hong Kong) Lee Chun Hei / Chau Hoi Wah (first round)

=== Top half ===
First round
PFQ	(Germany) M E Seidel (Germany) L Efler	22	22
(South Korea) Kim J-h (South Korea) Lee S-h	20	20
(Chinese Taipei) Tseng M-h (Chinese Taipei) Hu L-f	21	9
(Japan) K Kazuno (Japan) A Kurihara	23	21
6	(Malaysia) Tan K M (Malaysia) Lai P J	21	21
(Thailand) N Phuangphuapet (Thailand) J Kititharakul	13	19
(Malaysia) Goh S H (Malaysia) S J Lai	17	21	21
(Chinese Taipei) Lee Y (Chinese Taipei) Hsu Y-c	21	19	17
4	(Indonesia) P Jordan (Indonesia) D Susanto	13	21	21
(India) P J Chopra (India) N. S Reddy	21	19	15
(Chinese Taipei) Lu C-y (Chinese Taipei) Chiang K-h	13	16
(Thailand) B Isara (Thailand) S Amitrapai	21	21
7	(South Korea) Choi S-g (South Korea) Chae Y-j
(Chinese Taipei) Wang C-l (Chinese Taipei) Lee C-h	w	/	o
Q4	(Japan) T Hoki (Japan) S Hirota	21	21
(Denmark) A S Rasmussen (Denmark) L Kjaersfeldt	17	14

Second round
PFQ	(Germany) M E Seidel (Germany) L Efler	21	21
(Japan) K Kazuno (Japan) A Kurihara	19	17
6	(Malaysia) Tan K M (Malaysia) Lai P J	26	18	18
(Malaysia) Goh S H (Malaysia) S J Lai	24	21	21
4	(Indonesia) P Jordan (Indonesia) D Susanto	21	21
(Thailand) B Isara (Thailand) S Amitrapai	16	10
(Chinese Taipei) Wang C-l (Chinese Taipei) Lee C-h	21	18	19
Q4	(Japan) T Hoki (Japan) S Hirota	15	21	21

Quarterfinals
PFQ	(Germany) M E Seidel (Germany) L Efler	18	21	21
(Malaysia) Goh S H (Malaysia) S J Lai	21	13	18
4	(Indonesia) P Jordan (Indonesia) D Susanto	21	21
Q4	(Japan) T Hoki (Japan) S Hirota	17	17

Semifinals
PFQ	(Germany) M E Seidel (Germany) L Efler	18	12
4	(Indonesia) P Jordan (Indonesia) D Susanto	21	21

=== Bottom half ===
First round
(Germany) M Lamsfuss (Germany) I Herttrich	17	15
(China) Wang YL (China) Huang DP	21	21
Q2	(Malaysia) M A Abdul Latif (Indonesia) R A Riodingin	22	21
PFQ	(South Korea) Park K-h (South Korea) Baek H-n	20	16
(Denmark) M Christiansen (Denmark) S Thygesen	18	21	21
PFQ	(South Korea) Chung E-s (South Korea) Yoo H-w	21	11	19
Q1	(Japan) Y Kaneko (Japan) K Yonemoto	21	21
PFQ	(South Korea) Kim W-h (South Korea) Shin S-c	16	15
Q3	(India) S Rankireddy (India) A Ponnappa	18	19
(Hong Kong) Tang C M (Hong Kong) Tse Y S	21	21
(South Korea) Seo S-j (South Korea) Kim H-n	21	17	21
8	(Hong Kong) Lee C H (Hong Kong) Chau H W	18	21	11
(Japan) Y Kobayashi (Japan) M Matsutomo	18	9
(Malaysia) Chan P S (Malaysia) Cheah Y S	21	21
PFQ	(South Korea) Kim D-y (South Korea) Kim H-r	21	14	18
2	(England) C Adcock (England) G Adcock	18	21	21

Second round
(China) Wang YL (China) Huang DP	21	21
Q2	(Malaysia) M A Abdul Latif (Indonesia) R A Riodingin	9	11
(Denmark) M Christiansen (Denmark) S Thygesen	21	17	16
Q1	(Japan) Y Kaneko (Japan) K Yonemoto	19	21	21
(Hong Kong) Tang C M (Hong Kong) Tse Y S	21	18	22
(South Korea) Seo S-j (South Korea) Kim H-n	12	21	24
(Malaysia) Chan P S (Malaysia) Cheah Y S	16	21	21
2	(England) C Adcock (England) G Adcock	21	18	16

Quarterfinals
(China) Wang YL (China) Huang DP	17	27	21
Q1	(Japan) Y Kaneko (Japan) K Yonemoto	21	25	19
(South Korea) Seo S-j (South Korea) Kim H-n	21	10	18
(Malaysia) Chan P S (Malaysia) Cheah Y S	13	21	21

Semifinals
(China) Wang YL (China) Huang DP	21	21
(Malaysia) Chan P S (Malaysia) Cheah Y S	15	9

=== Finals ===
Semifinals
PFQ	(Germany) Marvin Emil Seidel (Germany) Linda Efler	18	12
4	(Indonesia) Praveen Jordan (Indonesia) Debby Susanto	21	21
(China) Wang Yilu (China) Huang Dongping	21	21
(Malaysia) Chan Peng Soon (Malaysia) Cheah Yee See	15	9

Final
4	(Indonesia) Praveen Jordan (Indonesia) Debby Susanto	21	21
(China) Wang Yilu (China) Huang Dongping	17	18

Preceded by 2016 Korea Open Super Series	Korea Open	Succeeded by 2018 Korea Open Super Series
Preceded by 2017 Australian Super Series	BWF Super Series; 2017 BWF Season	Succeeded by 2017 Japan Super Series
