= 2015 Malaysia Masters Grand Prix Gold =

Tournament details
- Dates: 13–18 January
- Edition: 7th
- Level: Grand Prix Gold
- Total prize money: US$120,000
- Venue: Stadium Perpaduan
- Location: Kuching, Sarawak, Malaysia

Champions
- Men's singles: (South Korea) Lee Hyun-il
- Women's singles: (Japan) Nozomi Okuhara
- Men's doubles: (Japan) Kenta Kazuno (Japan) Kazushi Yamada
- Women's doubles: (Denmark) Christinna Pedersen (Denmark) Kamilla Rytter Juhl
- Mixed doubles: (Denmark) Joachim Fischer Nielsen (Denmark) Christinna Pedersen

The 2015 Malaysia Masters Grand Prix Gold was the first grand prix gold and grand prix tournament of the 2015 BWF Grand Prix Gold and Grand Prix. The tournament was held at the Stadium Perpaduan in Kuching, Malaysia from 13–18 January 2015 and had a total purse of $120,000.

== Men's singles ==
=== Seeds ===
1. (India) Srikanth Kidambi (withdrew)
2. (Hong Kong) Hu Yun (second round)
3. (India) Kashyap Parupalli (third round)
4. (Hong Kong) Wei Nan (withdrew)
5. (Thailand) Boonsak Ponsana (first round)
6. (Japan) Takuma Ueda (first round)
7. (Thailand) Tanongsak Saensomboonsuk (semi-final)
8. (Chinese Taipei) Hsu Jen-hao (first round)
9. (Indonesia) Dionysius Hayom Rumbaka (first round)
10. (Hong Kong) Wong Wing Ki (first round)
11. (Malaysia) Chong Wei Feng (second round)
12. (Hong Kong) Ng Ka Long (first round)
13. (India) Sai Praneeth (third round)
14. (Japan) Riichi Takeshita (third round)
15. (Chinese Taipei) Wang Tzu-wei (third round)
16. (India) Anand Pawar (first round)

=== Finals ===
Quarterfinals
(South Korea) Jeon Hyeok-jin	16	21	21
(Malaysia) Soo Teck Zhi	21	14	10
(India) Ajay Jayaram	21	21	21
(Malaysia) Liew Daren	16	23	8
7	(Thailand) Tanongsak Saensomboonsuk	21	21
(Singapore) Derek Wong	15	16
(Malaysia) Mohamad Arif Abdul Latif	21	20	11
(South Korea) Lee Hyun-il	16	22	21

Semifinals
(South Korea) Jeon Hyeok-jin	10	21	21
(India) Ajay Jayaram	21	17	16
7	(Thailand) Tanongsak Saensomboonsuk	19	15
(South Korea) Lee Hyun-il	21	21

Final
(South Korea) Jeon Hyeok-jin	21	13	15
(South Korea) Lee Hyun-il	19	21	21

=== Top half ===
==== Section 1 ====
First Round
PFQ	(Malaysia) Cheam JW	17	22	19
(Indonesia) A Yunus	21	20	21
(Japan) K Sakai	21	10	17
(Singapore) Huang C	13	21	21
10	(Hong Kong) Wong WK	17	15
(South Korea) Jeon H-j	21	21
Q7	(Chinese Taipei) Hsueh H-y	17	18
(Malaysia) Tan KM	21	21

Second Round
(Indonesia) A Yunus	21	21
(Singapore) Huang C	18	17
(South Korea) Jeon H-j	21	16	21
(Malaysia) Tan KM	12	21	9

Third Round
(Indonesia) A Yunus	17	21	18
(South Korea) Jeon H-j	21	19	21

==== Section 2 ====
First Round
5	(Thailand) B Ponsana	wo
(India) S Dey
(Singapore) Loh KY	18	21	16
(Malaysia) Soo TZ	21	18	21
16	(India) A Pawar	16	16
(Malaysia) Goh SH	21	21
(Thailand) S Thammasin	19	5
(Indonesia) I Mustofa	21	21

Second Round
(India) S Dey	19	21	10
(Malaysia) Soo TZ	21	17	21
(Malaysia) Goh SH	21	20	12
(Indonesia) I Mustofa	11	22	21

Third Round
(Malaysia) Soo TZ	23	11	21
(Indonesia) I Mustofa	21	21	14

==== Section 3 ====
First Round
PFQ	(Malaysia) Woon KH	14	14
(Indonesia) F Hadmadi	21	21
(Malaysia) Chong YH	21	12
(India) A Prakash	23	21
9	(Indonesia) D Rumbaka	21	21	22
(India) A Jayaram	23	17	24
Q4	(Indonesia) R Megananda	24	18
(Indonesia) T Mahbub	26	21

Second Round
(Indonesia) F Hadmadi	17	21	13
(India) A Prakash	21	18	21
(India) A Jayaram	21	21
(Indonesia) T Mahbub	9	15

Third Round
(India) A Prakash	6	21	14
(India) A Jayaram	21	17	21

==== Section 4 ====
First Round
6	(Japan) T Ueda	18	15
(Malaysia) Liew D	21	21
(Indonesia) N Sulistyo	8	5
(Malaysia) Zf Zulkiffli	21	21
15	(Chinese Taipei) Wang T-w	15	21	21
(South Korea) Kim D-h	21	9	19
PFQ	(Indonesia) A Ginting	19	21	21
Q1	(Chinese Taipei) Yang C-c	21	12	7

Second Round
(Malaysia) Liew D	23	22
(Malaysia) Zf Zulkiffli	21	20
15	(Chinese Taipei) Wang T-w	21	21
PFQ	(Indonesia) A Ginting	12	15

Third Round
(Malaysia) Liew D	15	21	21
15	(Chinese Taipei) Wang T-w	21	8	9

=== Bottom half ===
==== Section 5 ====
First Round
Q2	(Singapore) S Lee	15	19
(Malaysia) I Zainuddin	21	21
Q6	(Indonesia) A Saputra	13	10
14	(Japan) R Takeshita	21	21
(Malaysia) Soong JV	21	21
Q8	(Malaysia) M Ruhizad	12	17
(Malaysia) Chiang JS	9	9
7	(Thailand) T Saensomboonsuk	21	21

Second Round
(Malaysia) I Zainuddin	21	12	13
14	(Japan) R Takeshita	7	21	21
(Malaysia) Soong JV	18	19
7	(Thailand) T Saensomboonsuk	21	21

Third Round
14	(Japan) R Takeshita	16	16
7	(Thailand) T Saensomboonsuk	21	21

==== Section 6 ====
First Round
(Indonesia) A Tedjono	15	13
(Singapore) D Wong	21	21
(Japan) K Nishimoto	21	21
12	(Hong Kong) Ng KL	12	14
(Malaysia) Goh GC	15	21	15
(Indonesia) J Christie	21	9	21
(Chinese Taipei) Shih K-c	17	15
3	(India) K Parupalli	21	21

Second Round
(Singapore) D Wong	21	9	21
(Japan) K Nishimoto	19	21	16
(Indonesia) J Christie	21	20	12
3	(India) K Parupalli	13	22	21

Third Round
(Singapore) D Wong	13	21	21
3	(India) K Parupalli	21	17	13

==== Section 7 ====
First Round
(Malaysia) A Abdul Latif	22	21
(Indonesia) A Marteen	20	19
(Indonesia) S Kuncoro	21	15	16
11	(Malaysia) Chong WF	14	21	21
Q5	(South Korea) Heo K-h	21	21
(Malaysia) N Ayub	14	12
(Thailand) S Avihingsanon	21	21
8	(Chinese Taipei) Hsu J-h	12	17

Second Round
(Malaysia) A Abdul Latif	21	23
11	(Malaysia) Chong WF	14	21
Q5	(South Korea) Heo K-h	21	22
(Thailand) S Avihingsanon	11	20

Third Round
(Malaysia) A Abdul Latif	21	23
Q5	(South Korea) Heo K-h	17	21

==== Section 8 ====
First Round
Q3	(Chinese Taipei) Lin C-h	22	0
(Malaysia) Lim CW	20	0^{r}
(Chinese Taipei) Lin Y-h	16	12
13	(India) S Praneeth	21	21
(Russia) V Ivanov	w/o
(South Korea) Lee H-i
(Indonesia) E Sukamta	18	21	16
2	(Hong Kong) Hu Y	21	15	21

Second Round
Q3	(Chinese Taipei) Lin C-h	20	11
13	(India) S Praneeth	22	21
(South Korea) Lee H-i	21	21
2	(Hong Kong) Hu Y	15	7

Third Round
13	(India) S Praneeth	15	17
(South Korea) Lee H-i	21	21

== Women's singles ==
=== Seeds ===
1. (Spain) Carolina Marín (withdrew)
2. (India) P. V. Sindhu (semi-final)
3. (Japan) Sayaka Takahashi (final)
4. (Japan) Nozomi Okuhara (champion)
5. (Thailand) Porntip Buranaprasertsuk (quarter-final)
6. (Chinese Taipei) Hsu Ya-ching (first round)
7. (Malaysia) Tee Jing Yi (first round)
8. (Indonesia) Lindaweni Fanetri (withdrew)

=== Finals ===
Semifinals
(Japan) Sayaka Sato	7	21	10
3	(Japan) Sayaka Takahashi	21	14	21
4	(Japan) Nozomi Okuhara	19	21	21
2	(India) P. V. Sindhu	21	13	8

Final
3	(Japan) Sayaka Takahashi	13	17
4	(Japan) Nozomi Okuhara	21	21

=== Top half ===
==== Section 1 ====
First Round
PFQ	(Japan) S Uchida	21	19	9
(Japan) K Imabeppu	19	21	21
Q3	(South Korea) Lee J-m	21	21
(Indonesia) M Kusumastuti	19	11
7	(Malaysia) Tee JY	1^{r}
(Japan) S Sato	8
Q1	(Indonesia) R Hartawan	21	24	19
(Indonesia) M Wiranto	14	26	21

Second Round
(Japan) K Imabeppu	21	21
Q3	(South Korea) Lee J-m	17	14
(Japan) S Sato	21	21
(Indonesia) M Wiranto	10	19

Quarterfinals
(Japan) K Imabeppu	19	16
(Japan) S Sato	21	21

==== Section 2 ====
First Round
3	(Japan) S Takahashi	21	21
(Chinese Taipei) Cheng C-y	15	14
PFQ	(Chinese Taipei) Hung S-h	14	11
(Japan) K Ito	21	21
PFQ	(Indonesia) D Ayustine	26	15
(Chinese Taipei) Pai Y-p	28	21
Q2	(South Korea) Ko E-b	15	18
(Hong Kong) Yip PY	21	21

Second Round
3	(Japan) S Takahashi	21	21
(Japan) K Ito	10	12
(Chinese Taipei) Pai Y-p	16	14
(Hong Kong) Yip PY	21	21

Quarterfinals
3	(Japan) S Takahashi	18	21	21
(Hong Kong) Yip PY	21	9	5

=== Bottom half ===
==== Section 3 ====
First Round
(Russia) K Polikarpova	5	15
(Singapore) Chen JY	21	21
(Japan) Y Hashimoto	21	19	21
6	(Chinese Taipei) Hsu Y-c	12	21	16
(Malaysia) Yang LL	15	14
(Indonesia) H Ramadini	21	21
(Indonesia) B Manuputty	10	13
4	(Japan) N Okuhara	21	21

Second Round
(Singapore) Chen JY	13	12
(Japan) Y Hashimoto	21	21
(Indonesia) H Ramadini	17	14
4	(Japan) N Okuhara	21	21

Quarterfinals
(Japan) Y Hashimoto	13	15
4	(Japan) N Okuhara	21	21

==== Section 4 ====
First Round
(Chinese Taipei) Lee C-h	20	15
(Malaysia) L Cheah	22	21
(Hong Kong) Cheung NY	12	20
5	(Thailand) P Buranaprasertsuk	21	22
Q4	(Indonesia) R Riodingin	15	17
(South Korea) Kim H-m	21	21
(Japan) A Mine	13	11
2	(India) P V Sindhu	21	21

Second Round
(Malaysia) L Cheah	18	14
5	(Thailand) P Buranaprasertsuk	21	21
(South Korea) Kim H-m	14	12
2	(India) P V Sindhu	21	21

Quarterfinals
5	(Thailand) P Buranaprasertsuk	21	9
2	(India) P V Sindhu	23	21

== Men's doubles ==
=== Seeds ===
1. (Singapore) Danny Bawa Chrisnanta / Chayut Triyachart (first round)
2. (Russia) Vladimir Ivanov / Ivan Sozonov (first round)
3. (Indonesia) Andrei Adistia / Hendra Aprida Gunawan (first round)
4. (Indonesia) Wahyu Nayaka / Ade Yusuf (second round)
5. (Indonesia) Markis Kido / Agripinna Prima Rahmanto Putra (quarter-final)
6. (Japan) Hiroyuki Saeki / Ryota Taohata (second round)
7. (Chinese Taipei) Liang Jui-wei / Lu Chia-bin (first round)
8. (Chinese Taipei) Chen Hung-ling / Wang Chi-lin (final)

=== Finals ===
Semifinals
8	(Chinese Taipei) Chen Hung-ling (Chinese Taipei) Wang Chi-lin	21	19	21
(Malaysia) Goh V Shem (Malaysia) Tan Wee Kiong	18	21	12
(Japan) Kenta Kazuno (Japan) Kazushi Yamada	21	14	21
(Indonesia) Angga Pratama (Indonesia) Ricky Karanda Suwardi	17	21	18

Final
8	(Chinese Taipei) Chen Hung-ling (Chinese Taipei) Wang Chi-lin	19	21	17
(Japan) Kenta Kazuno (Japan) Kazushi Yamada	21	14	21

=== Top half ===
==== Section 1 ====
First Round
1	(Singapore) D Chrisnanta (Singapore) C Triyachart	21	12	18
(Malaysia) Chooi KM (Malaysia) Teo KS	15	21	21
Q2	(Chinese Taipei) Liu W-c (Chinese Taipei) Yang P-h	21	21	21
(Malaysia) J Singh (Malaysia) R Tan	23	9	9
8	(Chinese Taipei) Chen H-l (Chinese Taipei) Wang C-l	21	21
Q4	(Malaysia) Tan WG (Malaysia) Teo EY	14	18
(Chinese Taipei) Lin C-y (Chinese Taipei) Wu H-l	21	21
(Indonesia) C Rusdianto (Indonesia) T Wardhana	13	17

Second Round
(Malaysia) Chooi KM (Malaysia) Teo KS	21	19	21
Q2	(Chinese Taipei) Liu W-c (Chinese Taipei) Yang P-h	13	21	11
8	(Chinese Taipei) Chen H-l (Chinese Taipei) Wang C-l	21	21
(Chinese Taipei) Lin C-y (Chinese Taipei) Wu H-l	11	14

Quarterfinals
(Malaysia) Chooi KM (Malaysia) Teo KS	21	11	23
8	(Chinese Taipei) Chen H-l (Chinese Taipei) Wang C-l	19	21	25

==== Section 2 ====
First Round
4	(Indonesia) W Nayaka (Indonesia) A Yusuf	21	18	26
PFQ	(Malaysia) Chua KW (Malaysia) N Heg	12	21	24
Q1	(South Korea) Jun B-c (South Korea) Kim D-y	14	8
(Malaysia) Goh VS (Malaysia) Tan WK	21	21
6	(Japan) H Saeki (Japan) R Taohata	21	21
(India) A Raju (India) G Venkat	7	15
(Malaysia) Lim KW (Malaysia) Ow YH	21	17	21
(England) A Ellis (England) P Mills	19	21	14

Second Round
4	(Indonesia) W Nayaka (Indonesia) A Yusuf	10	14
(Malaysia) Goh VS (Malaysia) Tan WK	21	21
6	(Japan) H Saeki (Japan) R Taohata	18	21	19
(Malaysia) Lim KW (Malaysia) Ow YH	21	19	21

Quarterfinals
(Malaysia) Goh VS (Malaysia) Tan WK	21	21
(Malaysia) Lim KW (Malaysia) Ow YH	18	13

=== Bottom half ===
==== Section 3 ====
First Round
(Chinese Taipei) Huang P-j (Chinese Taipei) Lu C-y	19	13
(Japan) T Inoue (Japan) Y Kaneko	21	21
(Malaysia) Hoon TH (Malaysia) Tan BH	21	21
7	(Chinese Taipei) Liang J-w (Chinese Taipei) Lu C-b	16	17
(Japan) K Kazuno (Japan) K Yamada	21	21
(India) T Kona (India) S Ravuri	9	14
Q3	(Singapore) T Hee (Singapore) H Wijaya	15	21	21
3	(Indonesia) A Adistia (Indonesia) H Gunawan	21	15	19

Second Round
(Japan) T Inoue (Japan) Y Kaneko	9	21	21
(Malaysia) Hoon TH (Malaysia) Tan BH	21	19	15
(Japan) K Kazuno (Japan) K Yamada	25	21
Q3	(Singapore) T Hee (Singapore) H Wijaya	23	15

Quarterfinals
(Japan) T Inoue (Japan) Y Kaneko	18	13
(Japan) K Kazuno (Japan) K Yamada	21	21

==== Section 4 ====
First Round
(Indonesia) F Kurniawan (Indonesia) A Wirawan	20	21	11
(Chinese Taipei) Liao M-c (Chinese Taipei) Tseng M-h	22	16	21
PFQ	(Malaysia) Low JS (Malaysia) Ong YS	14	17
5	(Indonesia) M Kido (Indonesia) A Putra	21	21
(Netherlands) R Bosch (Chinese Taipei) Tien T-c	11	17
PFQ	(Thailand) K Ketlen (Thailand) D Puavaranukroh	21	21
(Indonesia) A Pratama (Indonesia) R Suwardi	w	/	o
2	(Russia) V Ivanov (Russia) I Sozonov

Second Round
(Chinese Taipei) Liao M-c (Chinese Taipei) Tseng M-h	19	20
5	(Indonesia) M Kido (Indonesia) A Putra	21	22
PFQ	(Thailand) K Ketlen (Thailand) D Puavaranukroh	20	9
(Indonesia) A Pratama (Indonesia) R Suwardi	22	21

Quarterfinals
5	(Indonesia) M Kido (Indonesia) A Putra	14	15
(Indonesia) A Pratama (Indonesia) R Suwardi	21	21

== Women's doubles ==
=== Seeds ===
1. (Denmark) Christinna Pedersen / Kamilla Rytter Juhl (champion)
2. (Indonesia) Nitya Krishinda Maheswari / Greysia Polii (quarter-final)
3. (Indonesia) Pia Zebadiah / Rizki Amelia Pradipta (semi-final)
4. (Japan) Shizuka Matsuo / Mami Naito (quarter-final)
5. (Indonesia) Shendy Puspa Irawati / Vita Marissa (second round)
6. (Malaysia) Vivian Hoo Kah Mun / Woon Khe Wei (second round)
7. (Indonesia) Keshya Nurvita Hanadia / Devi Tika Permatasari (quarter-final)
8. (Thailand) Puttita Supajirakul / Sapsiree Taerattanachai (second round)

=== Finals ===
Semifinals
1	(Denmark) Christinna Pedersen (Denmark) Kamilla Rytter Juhl	21	23
3	(Indonesia) Pia Zebadiah Bernadeth (Indonesia) Rizki Amelia Pradipta	12	21
(Japan) Naoko Fukuman (Japan) Kurumi Yonao	21	19	22
(South Korea) Chae Yoo-jung (South Korea) Kim Ji-won	15	21	20

Final
1	(Denmark) Christinna Pedersen (Denmark) Kamilla Rytter Juhl	21	21
(Japan) Naoko Fukuman (Japan) Kurumi Yonao	14	14

=== Top half ===
==== Section 1 ====
First Round
1	(Denmark) C Pedersen (Denmark) K Rytter Juhl	21	21
(Japan) Y Fukushima (Japan) S Hirota	8	16
(Japan) A Kurihara (Japan) N Shinoya	21	21
(Chinese Taipei) Hsu Y-c (Chinese Taipei) Pai Y-p	13	9
8	(Thailand) P Supajirakul (Thailand) S Taerattanachai	21	21
(Chinese Taipei) Cheng C-y (Chinese Taipei) Lee C-h	11	12
Q4	(Chinese Taipei) Hung S-c (Chinese Taipei) Hung S-h	14	7
(Malaysia) A Anscelly (Malaysia) Soong FC	21	21

Second Round
1	(Denmark) C Pedersen (Denmark) K Rytter Juhl	21	21
(Japan) A Kurihara (Japan) N Shinoya	17	10
8	(Thailand) P Supajirakul (Thailand) S Taerattanachai	19	15
(Malaysia) A Anscelly (Malaysia) Soong FC	21	21

Quarterfinals
1	(Denmark) C Pedersen (Denmark) K Rytter Juhl	21	21
(Malaysia) A Anscelly (Malaysia) Soong FC	14	4

==== Section 2 ====
First Round
3	(Indonesia) P Bernadeth (Indonesia) R Pradipta	21	18	21
Q3	(Chinese Taipei) Hsieh P-c (Chinese Taipei) Wu T-j	19	21	15
PFQ	(Chinese Taipei) Chen S-y (Chinese Taipei) Cheng Y-c	11	16
(Indonesia) D Fitriani (Indonesia) N Melati	21	21
7	(Indonesia) K Hanadia (Indonesia) D Permatasari	21	21	21
(Malaysia) See TCV (Malaysia) Ti WC	23	9	15
(Malaysia) Chin KM (Malaysia) Peck YW	12	14
(Singapore) V Neo (Singapore) S Sari	21	21

Second Round
3	(Indonesia) P Bernadeth (Indonesia) R Pradipta	22	21
(Indonesia) D Fitriani (Indonesia) N Melati	20	13
7	(Indonesia) K Hanadia (Indonesia) D Permatasari	18	21	21
(Singapore) V Neo (Singapore) S Sari	21	19	10

Quarterfinals
3	(Indonesia) P Bernadeth (Indonesia) R Pradipta	21	21
7	(Indonesia) K Hanadia (Indonesia) D Permatasari	18	14

=== Bottom half ===
==== Section 3 ====
First Round
(Singapore) E Chua (Singapore) Tan WH	11	9
(Japan) N Fukuman (Japan) K Yonao	21	21
Q1	(Indonesia) A Awanda (Indonesia) K Istirani	20	12
6	(Malaysia) V Hoo (Malaysia) Woon KW	22	21
(Hong Kong) Chan TK (Hong Kong) Tse YS	7
(India) D Nair (India) M Sahdev	1^{r}
(Chinese Taipei) Chen H-h (Chinese Taipei) Lai C-w	21	8
4	(Japan) S Matsuo (Japan) M Naito	23	21

Second Round
(Japan) N Fukuman (Japan) K Yonao	21	26
6	(Malaysia) V Hoo (Malaysia) Woon KW	17	24
(Hong Kong) Chan TK (Hong Kong) Tse YS	12	10
4	(Japan) S Matsuo (Japan) M Naito	21	21

Quarterfinals
(Japan) N Fukuman (Japan) K Yonao	23	20	21
4	(Japan) S Matsuo (Japan) M Naito	21	22	18

==== Section 4 ====
First Round
(South Korea) Chae Y-j (South Korea) Kim J-w	21	21
(Malaysia) Lim YL (Malaysia) Lee MY	19	15
PFQ	(Indonesia) A Rahayu (Indonesia) J Sugiarto	19	15
5	(Indonesia) S Irawati (Indonesia) V Marissa	21	21
(Indonesia) G Imawan (Indonesia) T Nuraidah	21	15	18
Q2	(Indonesia) K Dewi (Indonesia) J Gozali	17	21	21
(Malaysia) J Choong (Malaysia) Yap CW	19	13
2	(Indonesia) N Maheswari (Indonesia) G Polii	21	21

Second Round
(South Korea) Chae Y-j (South Korea) Kim J-w	21	21
5	(Indonesia) S Irawati (Indonesia) V Marissa	10	12
Q2	(Indonesia) K Dewi (Indonesia) J Gozali	13	8
2	(Indonesia) N Maheswari (Indonesia) G Polii	21	21

Quarterfinals
(South Korea) Chae Y-j (South Korea) Kim J-w	21	21
2	(Indonesia) N Maheswari (Indonesia) G Polii	13	18

== Mixed doubles ==
=== Seeds ===
1. (Denmark) Joachim Fischer Nielsen / Christinna Pedersen (champion)
2. (Indonesia) Praveen Jordan / Debby Susanto (final)
3. (Singapore) Danny Bawa Chrisnanta / Vanessa Neo (quarter-final)
4. (Indonesia) Markis Kido / Pia Zebadiah Bernadeth (first round)
5. (Hong Kong) Lee Chun Hei / Chau Hoi Wah (second round)
6. (Indonesia) Alfian Eko Prasetya / Annisa Saufika (first round)
7. (Indonesia) Afiat Yuris Wirawan / Vita Marissa (quarter-final)
8. (Hong Kong) Chan Yun Lung / Tse Ying Suet (quarter-final)

=== Finals ===
Semifinals
1	(Denmark) Joachim Fischer Nielsen (Denmark) Christinna Pedersen	21	21
(Malaysia) Chan Peng Soon (Malaysia) Lai Pei Jing	10	7
(Indonesia) Edi Subaktiar (Indonesia) Gloria Emanuelle Widjaja	21	10	18
2	(Indonesia) Praveen Jordan (Indonesia) Debby Susanto	19	21	21

Final
1	(Denmark) Joachim Fischer Nielsen (Denmark) Christinna Pedersen	21	21
2	(Indonesia) Praveen Jordan (Indonesia) Debby Susanto	18	18

=== Top half ===
==== Section 1 ====
First Round
1	(Denmark) J Fischer Nielsen (Denmark) C Pedersen	21	21
(Malaysia) Tan CT (Malaysia) Lai SJ	17	18
PFQ	(Indonesia) D Indrianto (Indonesia) K Hanadia	9	12
(Singapore) T Hee (Singapore) Tan WH	21	21
7	(Indonesia) A Wirawan (Indonesia) V Marissa	21	23
(Chinese Taipei) Tseng M-h (Chinese Taipei) Lai C-w	11	21
(Japan) K Kazuno (Japan) S Matsuo	21	21
(Malaysia) V Mawan (India) P Sawant	12	15

Second Round
1	(Denmark) J Fischer Nielsen (Denmark) C Pedersen	21	21
(Singapore) T Hee (Singapore) Tan WH	14	17
7	(Indonesia) A Wirawan (Indonesia) V Marissa	21	21
(Japan) K Kazuno (Japan) S Matsuo	7	13

Quarterfinals
1	(Denmark) J Fischer Nielsen (Denmark) C Pedersen	21	21
7	(Indonesia) A Wirawan (Indonesia) V Marissa	10	15

==== Section 2 ====
First Round
4	(Indonesia) M Kido (Indonesia) P Z Bernadeth	18	14
(Malaysia) Chan PS (Malaysia) Lai PJ	21	21
PFQ	(Indonesia) F Kurniawan (Indonesia) K Dewi	23	22
(India) T Kona (India) S Reddy	21	20
8	(Hong Kong) Chan YL (Hong Kong) Tse YS	18	21	21
(South Korea) Choi S-k (South Korea) Chae Y-j	21	18	12
Q1	(South Korea) Kim D-y (South Korea) Go A-r	18	21	22
Q2	(Malaysia) Lim KW (Malaysia) Lee MY	21	14	20

Second Round
(Malaysia) Chan PS (Malaysia) Lai PJ	21	22	21
PFQ	(Indonesia) F Kurniawan (Indonesia) K Dewi	9	24	10
8	(Hong Kong) Chan YL (Hong Kong) Tse YS	21	16	21
(South Korea) Kim D-y (South Korea) Go A-r	15	21	16

Quarterfinals
(Malaysia) Chan PS (Malaysia) Lai PJ	21	21
8	(Hong Kong) Chan YL (Hong Kong) Tse YS	10	17

=== Bottom half ===
==== Section 3 ====
First Round
(Chinese Taipei) Liao M-c (Chinese Taipei) Chen H-h	17	12
(Indonesia) E Subaktiar (Indonesia) G Widjaja	21	21
(Chinese Taipei) Wang C-l (Chinese Taipei) Cheng C-y	19	13
5	(Hong Kong) Lee CH (Hong Kong) Chau HW	21	21
(Malaysia) L Abdul Khalid (Malaysia) Soong FC	21	16	11
Q3	(Indonesia) H Gunawan (Indonesia) N Melati	18	21	21
PFQ	(Indonesia) A Putra (Indonesia) R Pradipta	19	17
3	(Singapore) D Chrisnanta (Singapore) V Neo	21	21

Second Round
(Indonesia) E Subaktiar (Indonesia) G Widjaja	21	11	23
5	(Hong Kong) Lee CH (Hong Kong) Chau HW	18	21	21
Q3	(Indonesia) H Gunawan (Indonesia) N Melati	16	15
3	(Singapore) D Chrisnanta (Singapore) V Neo	21	21

Quarterfinals
(Indonesia) E Subaktiar (Indonesia) G Widjaja	21	21
3	(Singapore) D Chrisnanta (Singapore) V Neo	18	17

==== Section 4 ====
First Round
(Chinese Taipei) Chen H-l (Chinese Taipei) Lee C-h	21	22
(Indonesia) R Alexander (Indonesia) M Oktaviani	16	20
(Malaysia) Wong FY (Malaysia) Chow MK	21	21
6	(Indonesia) A Prasetya (Indonesia) A Saufika	19	18
PFQ	(Singapore) C Triyachart (Singapore) S Sari	17	13
PFQ	(Chinese Taipei) Lu C-y (Australia) W Chen	21	21
Q4	(South Korea) Jun B-c (South Korea) Kim J-w	18	19
2	(Indonesia) P Jordan (Indonesia) D Susanto	21	21

Second Round
(Chinese Taipei) Chen H-l (Chinese Taipei) Lee C-h	22	21
(Malaysia) Wong FY (Malaysia) Chow MK	20	10
PFQ	(Chinese Taipei) Lu C-y (Australia) W Chen	13	11
2	(Indonesia) P Jordan (Indonesia) D Susanto	21	21

Quarterfinals
(Chinese Taipei) Chen H-l (Chinese Taipei) Lee C-h	15	14
2	(Indonesia) P Jordan (Indonesia) D Susanto	21	21

Preceded by 2014 US Open Grand Prix	BWF Grand Prix Gold and Grand Prix; 2015 BWF Season	Succeeded by 2015 Syed Modi International Grand Prix Gold
