= Jun Bong-chan =

South Korean badminton player (born 1994)

Personal information
- Born: 21 February 1994 (age 32)
- Height: 1.77 m (5 ft 10 in)
- Weight: 69 kg (152 lb)

Sport
- Country: South Korea
- Sport: Badminton
- Handedness: Right

Men's & mixed doubles
- Highest ranking: 82 (MD 5 November 2015); 263 (XD 7 April 2016)
- BWF profile
Medal record
Men's badminton
Representing South Korea
World Junior Championships
Silver medal – second place	2010 Guadalajara	Mixed team
Silver medal – second place	2011 Taipei	Mixed team
Asian Junior Championships
Bronze medal – third place	2012 Gimcheon	Mixed team

Jun Bong-chan (Korean: 전봉찬; born 21 February 1994) is a South Korean badminton player from Gangwon Province. He graduated from Dong-eui University and later joining Samsung Electro-Mechanics badminton team. Jun was the runner-up at the 2014 Osaka International tournament in the men's doubles event partnered with Kim Duk-young. Together with Kim, he then won the Thailand International Challenge after beat Indonesian pair in the final.

== Achievements ==
=== BWF International Challenge/Series ===
Men's doubles
Year	Tournament	Partner	Opponent	Score	Result
2014	Osaka International	(South Korea) Kim Duk-young	(Japan) Kenta Kazuno (Japan) Kazushi Yamada	19–21, 11–21	(silver) Runner-up
2015	Thailand International	(South Korea) Kim Duk-young	(Indonesia) Angga Pratama (Indonesia) Ricky Karanda Suwardi	21–14, 13–21, 21–14	(gold) Winner

BWF International Challenge tournament
BWF International Series tournament
