= Kazushi Yamada =

Japanese badminton player (born 1987)

Personal information
- Born: 21 February 1987 (age 39) Niihama, Ehime, Japan
- Height: 1.68 m (5 ft 6 in)
- Weight: 62 kg (137 lb)

Sport
- Country: Japan
- Sport: Badminton
- Retired: 28 February 2017

Men's singles & doubles
- Highest ranking: 14 (MS) 2 December 2010; 14 (MD) 23 July 2015
- BWF profile
Medal record
Men's badminton
Representing Japan
Thomas Cup
Bronze medal – third place	2010 Kuala Lumpur	Men's team
East Asian Games
Bronze medal – third place	2009 Hong Kong	Men's team

Kazushi Yamada (山田和司, Yamada Kazushi; born 21 February 1987) is a Japanese badminton player from the Unisys team. In 2010, he competed at the Guangzhou Asian Games.

== Early life and career ==
Yamada was born in Niihama, Ehime Prefecture, into a family of badminton coaches. He began playing the sport in the third grade and later attended Komatsubara High School and Nippon Sport Science University. In 2008, during his senior year of university, he won the men's singles title at the All Japan Intercollegiate championships. After graduating in 2009, Yamada joined the Nihon Unisys corporate team.

== Coaching career ==
In March 2017, Yamada joined the Saishunkan badminton team as a singles coach. During his three years in the role, the team won several domestic tournaments, including the 2018 title in Japan's League and the 2019 All Japan Corporate Badminton Championships. Yamada departed from his position at Saishunkan in March 2020. Following his departure, he joined the Yonex badminton team as a coach on 1 April 2020.

== Achievements ==
=== BWF Grand Prix ===
The BWF Grand Prix has two level such as Grand Prix and Grand Prix Gold. It is a series of badminton tournaments, sanctioned by Badminton World Federation (BWF) since 2007.

Men's Doubles
Year	Tournament	Partner	Opponent	Score	Result	Ref.
2014	Russian Open	(Japan) Kenta Kazuno	(Japan) Takuto Inoue (Japan) Yuki Kaneko	19-21, 22–20, 21–13	(gold) Winner	
2014	Vietnam Open	(Japan) Kenta Kazuno	(Indonesia) Andrei Adistia (Indonesia) Hendra Aprida Gunawan	21-15, 21–23, 17–21	(silver) Runner-up	
2015	Malaysia Masters	(Japan) Kenta Kazuno	(Chinese Taipei) Chen Hung-ling (Chinese Taipei) Wang Chi-lin	21-19, 14–21, 21–17	(gold) Winner	

BWF Grand Prix Gold tournament
BWF Grand Prix tournament

=== BWF International Challenge or Series ===
Men's singles
Year	Tournament	Opponent	Score	Result	Ref.
2010	Osaka International	(Japan) Sho Sasaki	14-21, 17–21	(silver) Runner-up	
2012	Osaka International	(Japan) Kazumasa Sakai	Walkover	(silver) Runner-up	

Men's doubles
Year	Tournament	Partner	Opponent	Score	Result	Ref.
2013	Osaka International	(Japan) Kenta Kazuno	(Japan) Takatoshi Kurose (Japan) Sho Zeniya	21-14, 21–11	(gold) Winner	
2014	Osaka International	(Japan) Kenta Kazuno	(South Korea) Jun Bong-chan (South Korea) Kim Duck-yong	21-19, 21–11	(gold) Winner	
2015	Polish Open	(Japan) Kenta Kazuno	(Poland) Adam Cwalina (Poland) Przemysław Wacha	21-19, 21–12	(gold) Winner	
2015	Osaka International	(Japan) Kenta Kazuno	(Japan) Takuto Inoue (Japan) Yuki Kaneko	21-9, 21–19	(gold) Winner	

BWF International Challenge tournament
