= Kim Duk-young =

South Korean badminton player (born 1991)

Personal information
- Born: 12 September 1991 (age 35) Hwasun, South Jeolla, South Korea
- Height: 1.73 m (5 ft 8 in)

Sport
- Country: South Korea
- Sport: Badminton
- Handedness: Right

Men's & mixed doubles
- Highest ranking: 20 (MD 28 June 2018); 83 (XD 19 November 2015)
- BWF profile
Medal record
Men's badminton
Representing South Korea
Sudirman Cup
| Gold medal – first place | 2017 Gold Coast | Mixed team |
Asia Team Championships
| Bronze medal – third place | 2018 Alor Setar | Men's team |

Kim Duk-young (Korean: 김덕영; born 12 September 1991) is a South Korean badminton player. Together with Jun Bong-chan, he won the 2015 Thailand International Challenge tournament after beat Indonesian pair in the final. He also won the 2015 Osaka International tournament in the mixed doubles event partnered with Eom Hye-won. Kim helped the Korean national team compete at the 2017 Sudirman Cup and won that tournament.

== Achievements ==
=== BWF International Challenge/Series (4 titles, 1 runner-up) ===
Men's doubles
| Year | Tournament | Partner | Opponent | Score | Result |
|---|---|---|---|---|---|
| 2019 | Hungarian International | (South Korea) Kim Sa-rang | (Canada) Peter Briggs (Canada) Joshua Hurlburt-Yu | 21–12, 21–17 | (gold) Winner |
| 2019 | South Australia International | (South Korea) Kim Sa-rang | (Malaysia) Shia Chun Kang (Malaysia) Tan Boon Heong | 21–14, 17–21, 21–16 | (gold) Winner |
| 2014 | Thailand International | (South Korea) Jun Bong-chan | (Indonesia) Angga Pratama (Indonesia) Ricky Karanda Suwardi | 21–14, 13–21, 21–14 | (gold) Winner |
| 2014 | Osaka International | (South Korea) Jun Bong-chan | (Japan) Kenta Kazuno (Japan) Kazushi Yamada | 19–21, 11–21 | (silver) Runner-up |

Mixed doubles
| Year | Tournament | Partner | Opponent | Score | Result |
|---|---|---|---|---|---|
| 2015 | Osaka International | (South Korea) Eom Hye-won | (China) Liu Yuchen (China) Huang Dongping | 21–17, 16–21, 21–17 | (gold) Winner |

BWF International Challenge tournament
BWF International Series tournament
BWF Future Series tournament
