= Chen Hung-ling =

Taiwanese badminton player

Chen Hung-ling 陳宏麟
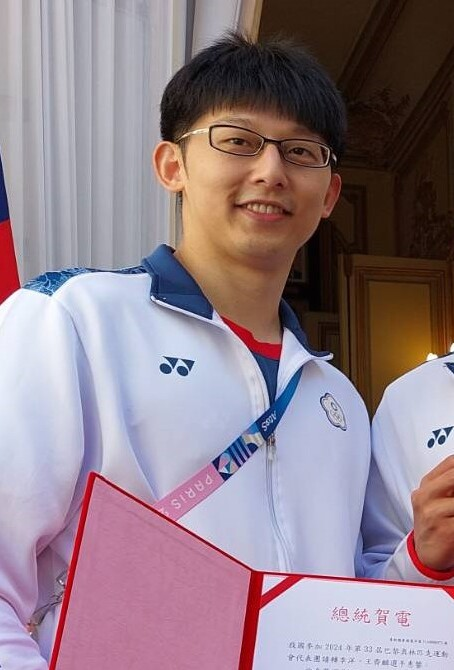
- Chen in 2024

Personal information
- Born: 10 February 1986 (age 40) Taipei, Taiwan
- Height: 1.77 m (5 ft 10 in)
- Weight: 70 kg (154 lb)

Sport
- Country: Republic of China (Taiwan)
- Sport: Badminton
- Handedness: Right

Men's & mixed doubles
- Highest ranking: 4 (MD with Wang Chi-lin, 25 October 2018); 5 (XD with Cheng Wen-hsing, 13 September 2012)
- BWF profile
Medal record
Men's badminton
Representing Chinese Taipei
World Championships
Bronze medal – third place	2018 Nanjing	Men's doubles
Asian Games
Bronze medal – third place	2010 Guangzhou	Mixed doubles
Bronze medal – third place	2014 Incheon	Men's team
Bronze medal – third place	2018 Jakarta–Palembang	Men's team
Asian Championships
Silver medal – second place	2010 New Delhi	Men's doubles
East Asian Games
Silver medal – second place	2009 Hong Kong	Men's doubles
Silver medal – second place	2013 Tianjin	Men's doubles
Bronze medal – third place	2009 Hong Kong	Mixed doubles
Bronze medal – third place	2009 Hong Kong	Men's team
Bronze medal – third place	2013 Tianjin	Men's team
Summer Universiade
Bronze medal – third place	2013 Kazan	Mixed doubles
Bronze medal – third place	2013 Kazan	Mixed team

Chen Hung-ling (Chinese: 陳宏麟; pinyin: Chén Hónglín; Wade–Giles: Chen Hung-lin; born 10 February 1986) is a Taiwanese former badminton player.

Chen Hung-ling is a doubles specialist. His best results have come with Cheng Wen-hsing in the mixed doubles, but he routinely competes in the men's doubles with Lin Yu-lang. In 2011, Chen and Cheng won the tournament at the Japan Super Series. They have reached the semi-finals of five other super series tournaments. He is known as the only player in the elite tournament that wears glasses while playing on the court.

They appeared at the 2012 Summer Olympics, but did not qualify from their group.

== Achievements ==
=== BWF World Championships ===
Men's doubles
Year	Venue	Partner	Opponent	Score	Result
2018	Nanjing Youth Olympic Sports Park; Nanjing, China	(Chinese Taipei) Wang Chi-lin	(Japan) Takeshi Kamura (Japan) Keigo Sonoda	17–21, 10–21	Bronze

=== Asian Games ===
Mixed doubles
Year	Venue	Partner	Opponent	Score	Result
2010	Tianhe Gymnasium; Guangzhou, China	(Chinese Taipei) Cheng Wen-hsing	(China) Zhang Nan (China) Zhao Yunlei	16–21, 15–21	Bronze

=== Asian Championships ===
Men's doubles
Year	Venue	Partner	Opponent	Score	Result
2010	Siri Fort Indoor Stadium; New Delhi, India	(Chinese Taipei) Lin Yu-lang	(South Korea) Cho Gun-woo (South Korea) Yoo Yeon-seong	19–21, 21–12, 17–21	Silver

=== East Asian Games ===
Men's doubles
Year	Venue	Partner	Opponent	Score	Result
2009	Queen Elizabeth Stadium, Hong Kong	(Chinese Taipei) Lin Yu-lang	(Chinese Taipei) Hu Chung-hsien (Chinese Taipei) Tsai Chia-hsin	17–21, 20–22	Silver
2013	Binhai New Area Dagang Gymnasium; Tianjin, China	(Chinese Taipei) Lu Chia-pin	(Chinese Taipei) Lee Sheng-mu (Chinese Taipei) Tsai Chia-hsin	8–21, 18–21	Silver

Mixed doubles
Year	Venue	Partner	Opponent	Score	Result
2009	Queen Elizabeth Stadium, Hong Kong	(Chinese Taipei) Hsieh Pei-chen	(China) Tao Jiaming (China) Zhang Yawen	15–21, 16–21	Bronze

=== Summer Universiade ===
Mixed doubles
Year	Venue	Partner	Opponent	Score	Result
2013	Tennis Academy; Kazan, Russia	(Chinese Taipei) Wang Pei-rong	(China) Liu Cheng (China) Tian Qing	15–21, 21–12, 17–21	Bronze

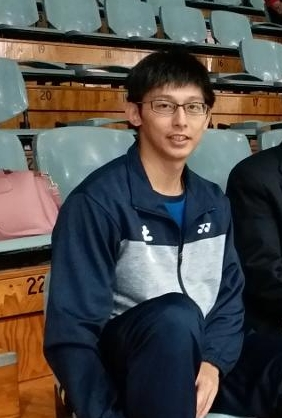
Chen at the 2018 New Zealand Open

=== BWF World Tour (2 titles) ===
The BWF World Tour, which was announced on 19 March 2017 and implemented in 2018, is a series of elite badminton tournaments sanctioned by the Badminton World Federation (BWF). The BWF World Tour is divided into levels of World Tour Finals, Super 1000, Super 750, Super 500, Super 300 (part of the HSBC World Tour), and the BWF Tour Super 100.

Men's doubles
Year	Tournament	Level	Partner	Opponent	Score	Result
2018	New Zealand Open	Super 300	(Chinese Taipei) Wang Chi-lin	(Indonesia) Berry Angriawan (Indonesia) Hardianto	21–17, 21–17	(gold) Winner
2018	Chinese Taipei Open	Super 300	(Chinese Taipei) Wang Chi-lin	(Chinese Taipei) Liao Min-chun (Chinese Taipei) Su Ching-heng	22–20, 21–9	(gold) Winner

=== BWF Superseries (2 titles, 1 runner-up) ===
The BWF Superseries, which was launched on 14 December 2006 and implemented in 2007, was a series of elite badminton tournaments, sanctioned by the Badminton World Federation (BWF). BWF Superseries levels were Superseries and Superseries Premier. A season of Superseries consisted of twelve tournaments around the world that had been introduced since 2011. Successful players were invited to the Superseries Finals, which were held at the end of each year.

Mixed doubles
Year	Tournament	Partner	Opponent	Score	Result
2011	Singapore Open	(Chinese Taipei) Cheng Wen-hsing	(Indonesia) Tontowi Ahmad (Indonesia) Liliyana Natsir	14–21, 25–27	(silver) Runner-up
2011	Japan Open	(Chinese Taipei) Cheng Wen-hsing	(Denmark) Joachim Fischer Nielsen (Denmark) Christinna Pedersen	21–19, 16–21, 21–15	(gold) Winner
2012	Singapore Open	(Chinese Taipei) Cheng Wen-hsing	(Japan) Shintaro Ikeda (Japan) Reiko Shiota	21–17, 21–11	(gold) Winner

BWF Super Series Premier tournament
BWF Super Series tournament

=== BWF Grand Prix (7 titles, 10 runners-up) ===
The BWF Grand Prix had two levels, the Grand Prix and Grand Prix Gold. It was a series of badminton tournaments sanctioned by the Badminton World Federation (BWF) and played between 2007 and 2017.

Men's doubles
Year	Tournament	Partner	Opponent	Score	Result
2008	New Zealand Open	(Chinese Taipei) Lin Yu-lang	(Indonesia) Fernando Kurniawan (Indonesia) Lingga Lie	22–20, 21–10	(gold) Winner
2009	Chinese Taipei Open	(Chinese Taipei) Lin Yu-lang	(Hong Kong) Yohan Hadikusumo Wiratama (Hong Kong) Wong Wai Hong	14–21 21–12, 21–19	(gold) Winner
2010	German Open	(Chinese Taipei) Lin Yu-lang	(China) Chai Biao (China) Zhang Nan	21–17, 13–21, 15–21	(silver) Runner-up
2010	U.S. Open	(Chinese Taipei) Lin Yu-lang	(Chinese Taipei) Fang Chieh-min (Chinese Taipei) Lee Sheng-mu	19–21, 14–21	(silver) Runner-up
2014	New Zealand Open	(Chinese Taipei) Lu Chia-pin	(Indonesia) Selvanus Geh (Indonesia) Kevin Sanjaya Sukamuljo	21–15, 21–23, 11–21	(silver) Runner-up
2015	Malaysia Masters	(Chinese Taipei) Wang Chi-lin	(Japan) Kenta Kazuno (Japan) Kazushi Yamada	19–21, 21–14, 17–21	(silver) Runner-up
2016	Chinese Taipei Open	(Chinese Taipei) Wang Chi-lin	(China) Li Junhui (China) Liu Yuchen	17–21, 21–17, 22–24	(silver) Runner-up
2016	Chinese Taipei Masters	(Chinese Taipei) Wang Chi-lin	(Indonesia) Fajar Alfian (Indonesia) Muhammad Rian Ardianto	6–11, 6–11, 13–11, 11–9, 10–12	(silver) Runner-up
2017	China Masters	(Chinese Taipei) Wang Chi-lin	(Japan) Takuto Inoue (Japan) Yuki Kaneko	21–14, 21–6	(gold) Winner
2017	Chinese Taipei Open	(Chinese Taipei) Wang Chi-lin	(Chinese Taipei) Lee Jhe-huei (Chinese Taipei) Lee Yang	21–16, 22–20	(gold) Winner
2017	New Zealand Open	(Chinese Taipei) Wang Chi-lin	(Malaysia) Ong Yew Sin (Malaysia) Teo Ee Yi	21–16, 21–18	(gold) Winner

Mixed doubles
Year	Tournament	Partner	Opponent	Score	Result
2008	New Zealand Open	(Chinese Taipei) Chou Chia-chi	(Chinese Taipei) Hsieh Yu-hsing (Chinese Taipei) Chien Yu-chin	21–18, 22–20	(gold) Winner
2010	Canada Open	(Chinese Taipei) Cheng Wen-hsing	(Chinese Taipei) Lee Sheng-mu (Chinese Taipei) Chien Yu-chin	16–21, 21–11, 15–21	(silver) Runner-up
2011	U.S. Open	(Chinese Taipei) Cheng Wen-hsing	(South Korea) Lee Yong-dae (South Korea) Ha Jung-eun	19–21, 13–21	(silver) Runner-up
2011	Canada Open	(Chinese Taipei) Cheng Wen-hsing	(Germany) Michael Fuchs (Germany) Birgit Michels	10–21, 21–23	(silver) Runner-up
2011	Macau Open	(Chinese Taipei) Cheng Wen-hsing	(Indonesia) Tontowi Ahmad (Indonesia) Liliyana Natsir	Walkover	(silver) Runner-up
2012	Australian Open	(Chinese Taipei) Cheng Wen-hsing	(Malaysia) Chan Peng Soon (Malaysia) Goh Liu Ying	22–20, 12–21, 23–21	(gold) Winner

BWF Grand Prix Gold tournament
BWF Grand Prix tournament

=== BWF International Challenge/Series (7 winners, 2 runners-up) ===
Men's doubles
Year	Tournament	Partner	Opponent	Score	Result
2008	Hellas International	(Chinese Taipei) Lin Yu-lang	(Chinese Taipei) Chien Yu-hsun (Chinese Taipei) Lin Yen-jui	19–21, 20–22	(silver) Runner-up
2008	Italian International	(Chinese Taipei) Lin Yu-lang	(Germany) Kristof Hopp (Germany) Johannes Schöttler	20–22, 13–21	(silver) Runner-up
2009	Polish International	(Chinese Taipei) Lin Yu-lang	(Denmark) Kasper Henriksen (Denmark) Christian John Skovgaard	21–14, 17–21, 21–19	(gold) Winner
2009	Finnish International	(Chinese Taipei) Lin Yu-lang	(Denmark) Rasmus Bonde (Denmark) Mikkel Delbo Larsen	21–19, 21–16	(gold) Winner
2014	Iran Fajr International	(Chinese Taipei) Lu Chia-pin	(Chinese Taipei) Liang Jui-wei (Chinese Taipei) Liao Kuan-hao	21–17, 21–18	(gold) Winner
2014	Austrian International	(Chinese Taipei) Lu Chia-pin	(Chinese Taipei) Liang Jui-wei (Chinese Taipei) Liao Kuan-hao	16–21, 21–12, 21–13	(gold) Winner

Mixed doubles
Year	Tournament	Partner	Opponent	Score	Result
2008	Canadian International	(Chinese Taipei) Chou Chia-chi	(China) Zhang Lei (China) Hu Minyu	21–8, 21–11	(gold) Winner
2008	Australian International	(Chinese Taipei) Chou Chia-chi	(Japan) Noriyasu Hirata (Japan) Shizuka Matsuo	21–16, 21–4	(gold) Winner
2008	Hellas International	(Chinese Taipei) Hsieh Pei-chen	(Denmark) Peter Mørk (Denmark) Maria Helsbøl	21–6, 21–9	(gold) Winner

BWF International Challenge tournament
BWF International Series tournament
BWF Future Series tournament

== Record Against Selected Opponents ==
Mixed doubles results with Cheng Wen-hsing against Super Series finalists, World Championships semifinalists, and Olympic quarterfinalists.

- (China) Zheng Bo & Ma Jin 1–0
- (China) Tao Jiaming & Tian Qing 0–2
- (China) Zhang Nan & Zhao Yunlei 1–7
- (China) Xu Chen & Ma Jin 0–1
- (Chinese Taipei) Lee Sheng-mu & Chien Yu-chin 1–1
- (Denmark) Joachim Fischer Nielsen & Christinna Pedersen 3–3
- (Denmark) Thomas Laybourn & Kamilla Rytter Juhl 1–0
- (England) / (Scotland) Chris Adcock & Imogen Bankier 0–1
- (England) Chris Adcock & Gabby Adcock 1–0
- (Germany) Michael Fuchs & Birgit Michels 1–2
- (Indonesia) Tantowi Ahmad & Liliyana Natsir 0–5
- (Indonesia) Fran Kurniawan & Pia Zebadiah Bernadet 3–0
- (Indonesia) Nova Widianto & Liliyana Natsir 0–1
- (South Korea) Ko Sung-hyun & Kim Ha-na 1–2
- (Malaysia) Chan Peng Soon & Goh Liu Ying 5–1
- (Poland) Robert Mateusiak & Nadieżda Zięba 5–0
- (Thailand) Sudket Prapakamol & Saralee Thungthongkam 3–3
