= Ayane Kurihara =

Japanese badminton player (born 1989)

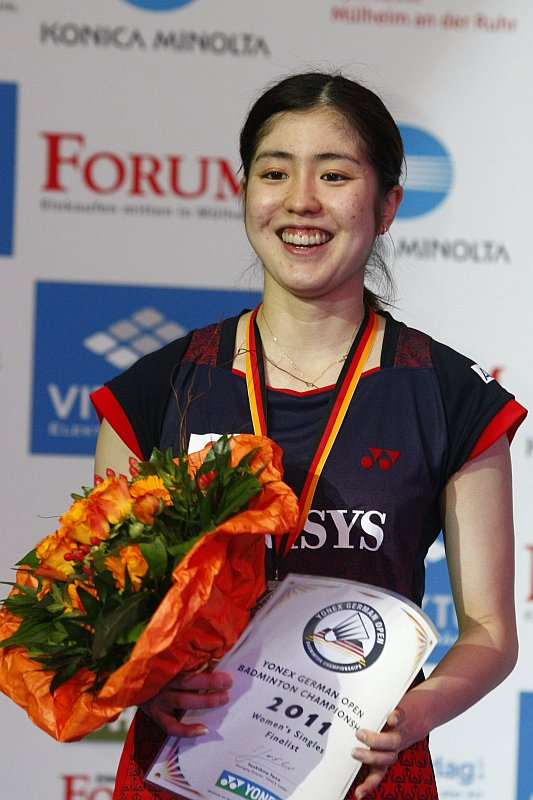

Personal information
- Born: 27 September 1989 (age 37) Kitakyushu, Fukuoka, Japan
- Height: 1.73 m (5 ft 8 in)
- Weight: 59 kg (130 lb)

Sport
- Country: Japan
- Sport: Badminton
- Handedness: Right
- Retired: 23 December 2019

Women's singles & doubles
- Highest ranking: 26 (WS 3 November 2011); 22 (WD 19 March 2015); 11 (XD 9 March 2017)
- BWF profile
Medal record
Women's badminton
Representing Japan
Sudirman Cup
Silver medal – second place	2015 Dongguan	Mixed team
Bronze medal – third place	2017 Gold Coast	Mixed team
Asia Mixed Team Championships
Gold medal – first place	2017 Ho Chi Minh	Mixed team
Silver medal – second place	2019 Hong Kong	Mixed team
Asian Junior Championships
Bronze medal – third place	2007 Kuala Lumpur	Mixed team

Ayane Kurihara (栗原 文音; born 27 September 1989) is a Japanese former badminton player. She began playing badminton at age 9, and played competitively from then on. She became a member of the Japan national badminton team at the age of 19. Her current partner is Naru Shinoya for women's doubles and Kohei Gondo for mixed doubles. Kurihara competed with her former partner Kenta Kazuno in the mixed doubles at the 2016 Summer Olympics in Rio de Janeiro, Brazil.

Kurihara announced her retirement through her Twitter account on 23 December 2019.

== Achievements ==
=== BWF World Tour (1 title, 1 runner-up) ===
The BWF World Tour, which was announced on 19 March 2017 and implemented in 2018, is a series of elite badminton tournaments sanctioned by the Badminton World Federation (BWF). The BWF World Tour is divided into levels of World Tour Finals, Super 1000, Super 750, Super 500, Super 300 (part of the HSBC World Tour), and the BWF Tour Super 100.

Women's doubles
Year	Tournament	Level	Partner	Opponent	Score	Result	Ref.
2018	Chinese Taipei Open	Super 300	(Japan) Naru Shinoya	(Japan) Nami Matsuyama (Japan) Chiharu Shida	10–21, 17–21	(silver) Runner-up	

Mixed doubles
Year	Tournament	Level	Partner	Opponent	Score	Result	Ref.
2018	Akita Masters	Super 100	(Japan) Kohei Gondo	(Indonesia) Alfian Eko Prasetya (Indonesia) Angelica Wiratama	21–9, 21–23, 21–17	(gold) Winner	

=== BWF Grand Prix (1 title, 3 runners-up) ===
The BWF Grand Prix had two levels, the Grand Prix and Grand Prix Gold. It was a series of badminton tournaments sanctioned by the Badminton World Federation (BWF) and played between 2007 and 2017.

Women's singles
Year	Tournament	Opponent	Score	Result	Ref.
2010	Russian Open	(Russia) Ella Diehl	21–19, 21–19	(gold) Winner	
2011	German Open	(China) Liu Xin	13–21, 21–15, 9–21	(silver) Runner-up	

Women's doubles
Year	Tournament	Partner	Opponent	Score	Result	Ref.
2015	Swiss Open	(Japan) Naru Shinoya	(China) Bao Yixin (China) Tang Yuanting	19–21, 21–14, 17–21	(silver) Runner-up	
2015	U.S. Open	(Japan) Naru Shinoya	(China) Yu Yang (China) Zhong Qianxin	14–21, 10–21	(silver) Runner-up	

BWF Grand Prix Gold tournament
BWF Grand Prix tournament

=== BWF International Challenge/Series (5 titles, 3 runners-up) ===
Women's singles
Year	Tournament	Opponent	Score	Result	Ref.
2010	Malaysia International	(Japan) Masayo Nojirino	21–15, 18–21, 21–10	(gold) Winner	

Women's doubles
Year	Tournament	Partner	Opponent	Score	Result	Ref.
2014	Polish Open	(Japan) Naru Shinoya	(Russia) Anastasia Chervyakova (Russia) Nina Vislova	21–15, 17–21, 20–22	(silver) Runner-up	
2014	Malaysia International	(Japan) Naru Shinoya	(Indonesia) Maretha Dea Giovani (Indonesia) Rosyita Eka Putri Sari	21–14, 21–17	(gold) Winner	
2015	China International	(Japan) Naru Shinoya	(China) Ou Dongni (China) Yu Xiaohan	21–14, 18–21, 21–23	(silver) Runner-up	
2015	Portugal International	(Japan) Naru Shinoya	(Germany) Carola Bott (Germany) Jennifer Karnott	21–13, 21–16	(gold) Winner	

Mixed doubles
Year	Tournament	Partner	Opponent	Score	Result
2018	South Australia International	(Japan) Kohei Gondo	(Singapore) Terry Hee (Singapore) Citra Putri Sari Dewi	20–22, 18–21	(silver) Runner-up
2018	Indonesia International	(Japan) Kohei Gondo	(Indonesia) Adnan Maulana (Indonesia) Shella Devi Aulia	21–17, 23–21	(gold) Winner
2018	Yonex / K&D Graphics International	(Japan) Kohei Gondo	(Thailand) Natchanon Tulamok (Thailand) Natcha Saenghote	21–7, 21–16	(gold) Winner

BWF International Challenge tournament
BWF International Series tournament
BWF Future Series tournament
