= Kazumasa Sakai =

Japanese badminton player (born 1990)

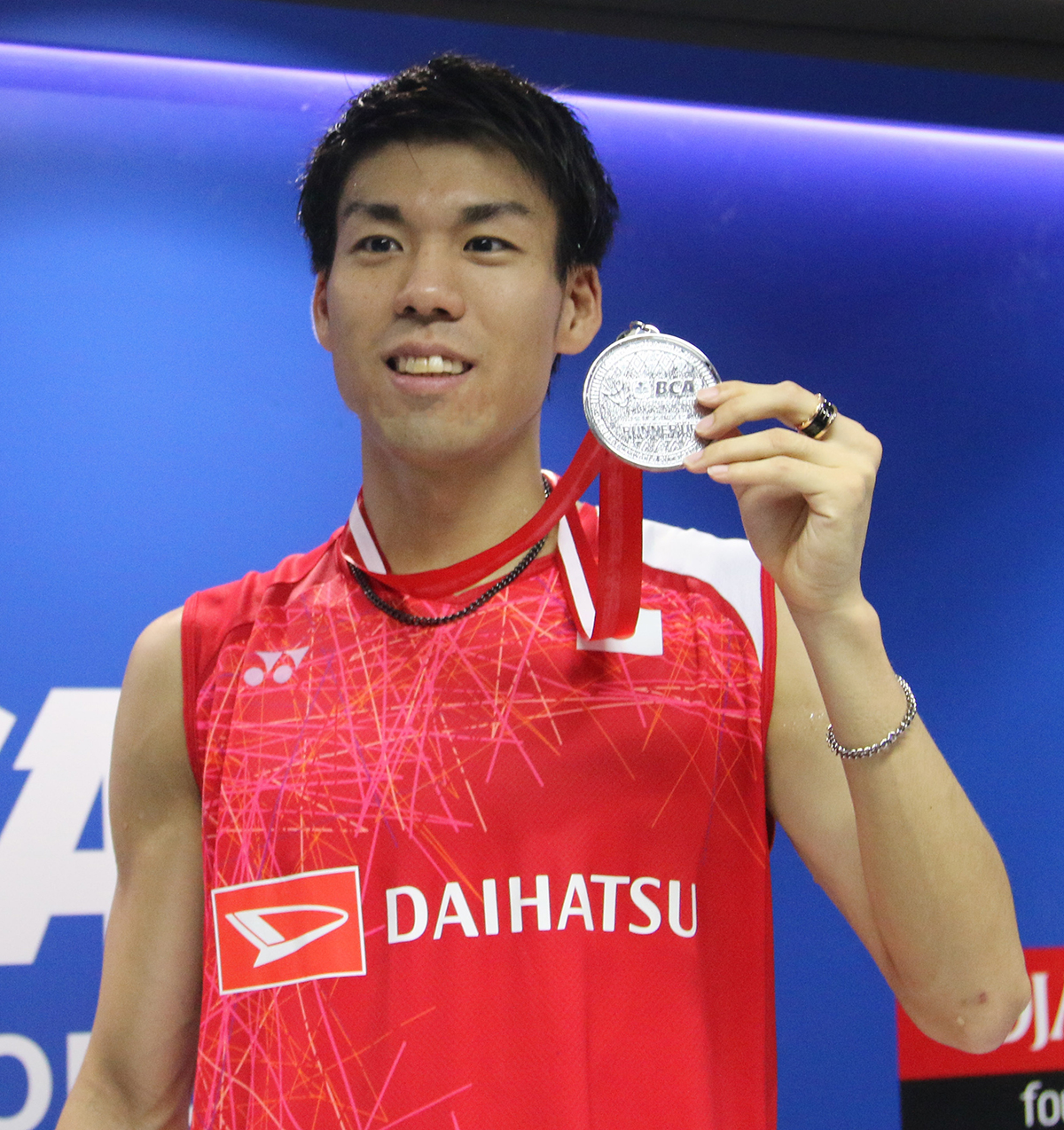
- Sakai won a silver medal at the 2017 Indonesia Open

Personal information
- Born: Kazumasa Sakai; 13 February 1990 (age 36) Kanazawa, Ishikawa, Japan
- Height: 1.79 m (5 ft 10 in)
- Weight: 69 kg (152 lb)

Sport
- Country: Japan
- Sport: Badminton
- Handedness: Right

Men's singles
- Highest ranking: 15 (8 March 2018)
- BWF profile
Medal record
Men's badminton
Representing Japan
Thomas Cup
Silver medal – second place	2018 Bangkok	Men's team
Asia Mixed Team Championships
Gold medal – first place	2017 Ho Chi Minh	Mixed team
East Asian Games
Bronze medal – third place	2013 Tianjin	Men's singles

Kazumasa Sakai (坂井一将, Sakai Kazumasa; born 13 February 1990) is a Japanese badminton player who is single specialist. He represented Japan and won a silver medal at the 2017 Indonesia Open.

== Achievements ==
=== East Asian Games ===
Men's singles
Year	Venue	Opponent	Score	Result	Ref.
2013	Binhai New Area Dagang Gymnasium; Tianjin, China	(China) Wang Zhengming	11–21, 17–21	Bronze	

=== BWF World Tour ===
The BWF World Tour, announced on 19 March 2017 and implemented in 2018, is a series of elite badminton tournaments, sanctioned by Badminton World Federation (BWF). The BWF World Tour is divided into six levels, namely World Tour Finals, Super 1000, Super 750, Super 500, Super 300 (part of the HSBC World Tour), and the BWF Tour Super 100.

Men's singles
Year	Tournament	Level	Opponent	Score	Result
2018	Indonesia Masters	Super 500	(Indonesia) Anthony Sinisuka Ginting	13–21, 12–21	(silver) Runner-up

=== BWF Superseries ===
The BWF Superseries, which was launched on 14 December 2006 and implemented in 2007, was a series of elite badminton tournaments, sanctioned by the Badminton World Federation (BWF). BWF Superseries levels were Superseries and Superseries Premier. A season of Superseries consisted of twelve tournaments around the world that had been introduced since 2011. Successful players were invited to the Superseries Finals, which were held at the end of each year.

Men's singles
Year	Tournament	Opponent	Score	Result
2017	Indonesia Open	(India) Srikanth Kidambi	11–21, 19–21	(silver) Runner-up

BWF Super Series Premier tournament

=== BWF Grand Prix ===
The BWF Grand Prix had two levels, the BWF Grand Prix and Grand Prix Gold. It was a series of badminton tournaments sanctioned by the Badminton World Federation (BWF) which was held from 2007 to 2017.

Men's singles
Year	Tournament	Opponent	Score	Result
2012	Russian Open	(Russia) Vladimir Malkov	21–17, 21–17	(gold) Winner

BWF Grand Prix tournament

=== BWF International Challenge/Series ===
Men's singles
Year	Tournament	Opponent	Score	Result	Ref.
2012	Osaka International	(Japan) Kazushi Yamada	Walkover	(gold) Winner	
2012	Scottish International	(India) Anand Pawar	21–10, 11–21, 17–21	(silver) Runner-up	
2015	China International	(China) Qiao Bin	14–21, 12–21	(silver) Runner-up	
2015	Portugal International	(Norway) Marius Myhre	21–13, 21–13	(gold) Winner	
2015	Osaka International	(South Korea) Jeon Hyeok-jin	21–15, 17–21, 14–21	(silver) Runner-up	

BWF International Challenge tournament
BWF International Series tournament
