= Kenta Kazuno =

Japanese badminton player (born 1985)

Personal information
- Born: 25 November 1985 (age 40) Ōtsu, Japan
- Height: 1.70 m (5 ft 7 in)
- Weight: 67 kg (148 lb)

Sport
- Country: Japan
- Sport: Badminton
- Retired: 31 March 2018

Men's & mixed doubles
- Highest ranking: 14 (MD 23 July 2015); 11 (XD 9 March 2017)
- BWF profile
Medal record
Men's badminton
Representing Japan
Sudirman Cup
| Silver medal – second place | 2015 Dongguan | Mixed team |
| Bronze medal – third place | 2017 Gold Coast | Mixed team |
Thomas Cup
| Bronze medal – third place | 2010 Kuala Lumpur | Men's team |
Asia Mixed Team Championships
| Gold medal – first place | 2017 Ho Chi Minh | Mixed team |
East Asian Games
| Bronze medal – third place | 2009 Hong Kong | Men's team |

Kenta Kazuno (数野 健太, Kazuno Kenta; born 25 November 1985) is a former Japanese badminton player who competed in doubles. He competed at the 2016 Summer Olympics in Rio de Janeiro, Brazil.

== Achievements ==
=== BWF Grand Prix ===
The BWF Grand Prix had two levels, the Grand Prix and Grand Prix Gold. It was a series of badminton tournaments sanctioned by the Badminton World Federation (BWF) and played between 2007 and 2017.

Men's doubles
| Year | Tournament | Partner | Opponent | Score | Result | Ref. |
|---|---|---|---|---|---|---|
| 2009 | German Open | (Japan) Kenichi Hayakawa | (South Korea) Lee Yong-dae (South Korea) Shin Baek-cheol | 13–21, 16–21 | (silver) Runner-up | |
| 2010 | Dutch Open | (Japan) Yoshiteru Hirobe | (Japan) Hirokatsu Hashimoto (Japan) Noriyasu Hirata | 17–21, 13–21 | (silver) Runner-up | |
| 2012 | U.S. Open | (Japan) Yoshiteru Hirobe | (Japan) Hiroyuki Endo (Japan) Kenichi Hayakawa | 15–21, 10–21 | (silver) Runner-up | |
| 2014 | Russian Open | (Japan) Kazushi Yamada | (Japan) Takuto Inoue (Japan) Yuki Kaneko | 19–21, 22–20, 21–13 | (gold) Winner | |
| 2014 | Vietnam Open | (Japan) Kazushi Yamada | (Indonesia) Andrei Adistia (Indonesia) Hendra Aprida Gunawan | 21–15, 21–23, 17–21 | (silver) Runner-up | |
| 2015 | Malaysia Masters | (Japan) Kazushi Yamada | (Chinese Taipei) Chen Hung-ling (Chinese Taipei) Wang Chi-lin | 21–19, 14–21, 21–17 | (gold) Winner | |

BWF Grand Prix Gold tournament
BWF Grand Prix tournament

=== BWF International Challenge/Series ===
Men's doubles
| Year | Tournament | Partner | Opponent | Score | Result | Ref. |
|---|---|---|---|---|---|---|
| 2013 | Osaka International | (Japan) Kazushi Yamada | (Japan) Takatoshi Kurose (Japan) Sho Zeniya | 21–14, 21–11 | (gold) Winner | |
| 2014 | Osaka International | (Japan) Kazushi Yamada | (South Korea) Jun Bong-chan (South Korea) Kim Duck-yong | 21–19, 21–11 | (gold) Winner | |
| 2015 | Polish Open | (Japan) Kazushi Yamada | (Poland) Adam Cwalina (Poland) Przemysław Wacha | 21–19, 21–12 | (gold) Winner | |
| 2015 | Osaka International | (Japan) Kazushi Yamada | (Japan) Takuto Inoue (Japan) Yuki Kaneko | 21–9, 21–19 | (gold) Winner | |

BWF International Challenge tournament
BWF International Series tournament
