= 2019 Korea Masters =

2019 badminton tournament in Gwangju

Tournament details
- Dates: 19–24 November
- Level: Super 300
- Total prize money: US$200,000
- Venue: Gwangju Women’s University Stadium
- Location: Gwangju, South Korea

Champions
- Men's singles: (Japan) Kanta Tsuneyama
- Women's singles: (South Korea) An Se-young
- Men's doubles: (Chinese Taipei) Lee Yang (Chinese Taipei) Wang Chi-lin
- Women's doubles: (Japan) Nami Matsuyama (Japan) Chiharu Shida
- Mixed doubles: (Hong Kong) Tang Chun Man (Hong Kong) Tse Ying Suet

The 2019 Korea Masters (officially known as the Gwangju Korea Masters 2019) was a badminton tournament which took place at Gwangju Women’s University Stadium in Gwangju, South Korea, from 19 to 24 November 2019 and had a total prize of $200,000.

== Tournament ==
The 2019 Korea Masters was the twenty-fifth tournament of the 2019 BWF World Tour and also part of the Korea Masters championships, which has been held since 2007. This was the last tournament to be counted in the 2019 BWF World Tour Finals rank. This tournament was organized by Badminton Korea Association and sanctioned by the BWF.

=== Venue ===
This international tournament was held at Gwangju Women’s University Stadium in Gwangju, South Korea.

=== Point distribution ===
Below is the point distribution table for each phase of the tournament based on the BWF points system for the BWF World Tour Super 300 event.

Winner	Runner-up	3/4	5/8	9/16	17/32	33/64	65/128
7,000	5,950	4,900	3,850	2,750	1,670	660	320

=== Prize money ===
The total prize money for this tournament was US$200,000. Distribution of prize money was in accordance with BWF regulations.

Event	Winner	Finals	Semi-finals	Quarter-finals	Last 16
Singles	$15,000	$7,600	$2,900	$1,200	$700
Doubles	$15,800	$7,600	$2,800	$1,450	$750

== Men's singles ==
=== Seeds ===
1. (China) Shi Yuqi (withdrew)
2. (China) Chen Long (withdrew)
3. (Denmark) Anders Antonsen (withdrew)
4. (Denmark) Viktor Axelsen (withdrew)
5. (Hong Kong) Ng Ka Long (second round)
6. (India) Srikanth Kidambi (second round)
7. (Thailand) Kantaphon Wangcharoen (second round)
8. (Japan) Kenta Nishimoto (second round)

=== Finals ===
Semi-finals
(Japan) Kanta Tsuneyama	21	18	21
(China) Lu Guangzu	14	21	17
(China) Lin Dan	21	21
(China) Zhao Junpeng	12	11

Final
(Japan) Kanta Tsuneyama	24	21
(China) Lin Dan	22	12

=== Top half ===
==== Section 1 ====
First Round
PFQ	(Japan) K Sakai	8^{r}
(India) Sa Verma	11
Q2	(South Korea) Kim D-h	13	21	21
(India) So Verma	21	12	13
6	(India) S Kidambi	21	21
(Hong Kong) Wong W K	18	17
(Japan) K Tsuneyama	21	21
PFQ	(Chinese Taipei) Lu C-h	11	10

Second Round
(India) Sa Verma	19	12
Q2	(South Korea) Kim D-h	21	21
6	(India) S Kidambi	14	19
(Japan) K Tsuneyama	21	21

Quarter-finals
Q2	(South Korea) Kim D-h	21	20	6
(Japan) K Tsuneyama	16	22	21

==== Section 2 ====
First Round
PFQ	(Denmark) V Svendsen	14	13
(Chinese Taipei) Wang T-w	21	21
Q3	(Chinese Taipei) Lee C-h	19	8
(China) Lu GZ	21	21
7	(Thailand) K Wangcharoen	21	21
(Hong Kong) Lee C Y	16	15
Q1	(Chinese Taipei) Yang C-c	13	21	15
Q4	(Chinese Taipei) Lin C-y	21	15	21

Second Round
(Chinese Taipei) Wang T-w	18	21	18
(China) Lu GZ	21	13	21
7	(Thailand) K Wangcharoen	21	14	13
Q4	(Chinese Taipei) Lin C-y	16	21	21

Quarter-finals
(China) Lu GZ	17	21	21
Q4	(Chinese Taipei) Lin C-y	21	18	10

=== Bottom half ===
==== Section 3 ====
First Round
(South Korea) Son W-h	21	19	21
(Thailand) T Saensomboonsuk	17	21	23
PFQ	(Israel) M Zilberman	12	13
5	(Hong Kong) Ng K L	21	21
(South Korea) Lee D-k	21	14	14
(China) Lin D	19	21	21
PFQ	(South Korea) Heo K-h	19	21	21
PFQ	(Chinese Taipei) Lin Y-h	21	14	16

Second Round
(Thailand) T Saensomboonsuk	21	21
5	(Hong Kong) Ng K L	12	19
(China) Lin D	26	21	21
PFQ	(South Korea) Heo K-h	28	19	19

Quarter-finals
(Thailand) T Saensomboonsuk	18	11
(China) Lin D	21	21

==== Section 4 ====
First Round
(France) B Leverdez	12	21
(China) Zhao JP	21	23
PFQ	(France) L Claerbout	16	20
8	(Japan) K Nishimoto	21	22
(Japan) K Watanabe	15	21	21
PFQ	(France) L Corvee	21	19	15
PFQ	(China) Li SF	18	19
PFQ	(Thailand) K Vitidsarn	21	21

Second Round
(China) Zhao JP	21	21
8	(Japan) K Nishimoto	18	13
(Japan) K Watanabe	21	21
PFQ	(Thailand) K Vitidsarn	16	16

Quarter-finals
(China) Zhao JP	21	10	21
(Japan) K Watanabe	13	21	19

== Women's singles ==
=== Seeds ===
1. (Japan) Akane Yamaguchi (semifinals)
2. (China) He Bingjiao (second round)
3. (India) Saina Nehwal (withdrew)
4. (Japan) Sayaka Takahashi (first round)
5. (South Korea) Sung Ji-hyun (final)
6. (China) Han Yue (withdrew)
7. (South Korea) An Se-young (champion)
8. (Spain) Carolina Marín (withdrew)

=== Finals ===
Semi-finals
1	(Japan) Akane Yamaguchi	16	16
7	(South Korea) An Se-young	21	21
(Japan) Saena Kawakami	12	10
5	(South Korea) Sung Ji-hyun	21	21

Final
7	(South Korea) An Se-young	21	21
5	(South Korea) Sung Ji-hyun	13	17

=== Top half ===
==== Section 1 ====
First Round
1	(Japan) A Yamaguchi	21	21
Q3	(South Korea) Kim N-y	19	14
(Scotland) K Gilmour	21	21
(Thailand) P Chaiwan	12	14
PFQ	(Chinese Taipei) Lin J-y	21	17	12
PFQ	(South Korea) Lee S-y	17	21	21
(United States) I Zhong	17	13
Q4	(South Korea) Kim S-m	21	21

Second Round
1	(Japan) A Yamaguchi	19	21	21
(Scotland) K Gilmour	21	13	12
PFQ	(South Korea) Lee S-y	21	21
Q4	(South Korea) Kim S-m	13	15

Quarter-finals
1	(Japan) A Yamaguchi	21	21
PFQ	(South Korea) Lee S-y	9	15

==== Section 2 ====
First Round
PFQ	(Chinese Taipei) Liang T-y	11	13
(South Korea) Sim Y-j	21	21
Q2	(South Korea) Park G-e	14	21	21
(Belgium) L Tan	21	19	18
7	(South Korea) An S-y	25	21
(Japan) A Ohori	23	10
(China) Wang ZY	21	15	21
(Chinese Taipei) Pai Y-p	8	21	15

Second Round
(South Korea) Sim Y-j	21	21	21
Q2	(South Korea) Park G-e	23	18	9
7	(South Korea) An S-y	21	21
(China) Wang ZY	12	16

Quarter-finals
(South Korea) Sim Y-j	13	13
7	(South Korea) An S-y	21	21

=== Bottom half ===
==== Section 3 ====
First Round
(Japan) S Kawakami	21	21
(Hong Kong) Yip P Y	16	18
(South Korea) Kim H-m	w	/	o
8	(Spain) C Marín
(South Korea) Jeon J-i	21	21
(Japan) A Mine	18	17
(China) Zhang YM	21	21
4	(Japan) S Takahashi	13	16

Second Round
(Japan) S Kawakami	21	21
(South Korea) Kim H-m	16	14
(South Korea) Jeon J-i	20	21	10
(China) Zhang YM	22	16	21

Quarter-finals
(Japan) S Kawakami	21	21
(China) Zhang YM	14	16

==== Section 4 ====
First Round
(Thailand) B Ongbamrungphan	13	21	21
(China) Cai YY	21	19	14
(Thailand) N Jindapol	15	20
5	(South Korea) Sung J-h	21	22
(South Korea) Kim G-e	21	21
(Thailand) S Katethong	7	14
Q1	(South Korea) Bae J-w	11	19
2	(China) He BJ	21	21

Second Round
(Thailand) B Ongbamrungphan	15	21	12
5	(South Korea) Sung J-h	21	15	21
(South Korea) Kim G-e	21	12	21
2	(China) He BJ	13	21	19

Quarter-finals
5	(South Korea) Sung J-h	21	21
(South Korea) Kim G-e	15	11

== Men's doubles ==
=== Seeds ===
1. (China) Li Junhui / Liu Yuchen (withdrew)
2. (Japan) Takeshi Kamura / Keigo Sonoda (withdrew)
3. (Japan) Hiroyuki Endo / Yuta Watanabe (withdrew)
4. (China) Han Chengkai / Zhou Haodong (first round)
5. (Denmark) Kim Astrup / Anders Skaarup Rasmussen (first round)
6. (Chinese Taipei) Lee Yang / Wang Chi-lin (champions)
7. (Malaysia) Goh V Shem / Tan Wee Kiong (final)
8. (South Korea) Choi Sol-gyu / Seo Seung-jae (semi-finals)

=== Finals ===
Semi-finals
8	(South Korea) Choi Sol-gyu (South Korea) Seo Seung-jae	21	15	19
7	(Malaysia) Goh V Shem (Malaysia) Tan Wee Kiong	16	21	21
6	(Chinese Taipei) Lee Yang (Chinese Taipei) Wang Chi-lin	21	21
(South Korea) Kim Won-ho (South Korea) Park Kyung-hoon	16	13

Final
7	(Malaysia) Goh V Shem (Malaysia) Tan Wee Kiong	19	22	19
6	(Chinese Taipei) Lee Yang (Chinese Taipei) Wang Chi-lin	21	20	21

=== Top half ===
==== Section 1 ====
First Round
PFQ	(Japan) M Kaneko (Japan) Y Kubota	14	15
(China) He JT (China) Tan Q	21	21
(Japan) A Koga (Japan) T Saito	23	18	21
(Chinese Taipei) Lin C-y (Chinese Taipei) Yang M-t	21	21	17
8	(South Korea) Choi S-g (South Korea) Seo S-j	21	22
(Malaysia) Goh S F (Malaysia) N Izzuddin M R	17	20
Q3	(Thailand) N Phuangphuapet (Thailand) T Viriyangkura	22	21
(Chinese Taipei) Liao M-c (Chinese Taipei) Su C-h	20	14

Second Round
(China) He JT (China) Tan Q	21	21
(Japan) A Koga (Japan) T Saito	16	18
8	(South Korea) Choi S-g (South Korea) Seo S-j	21	21
Q3	(Thailand) N Phuangphuapet (Thailand) T Viriyangkura	13	9

Quarter-finals
(China) He JT (China) Tan Q	10	18
8	(South Korea) Choi S-g (South Korea) Seo S-j	21	21

==== Section 2 ====
First Round
PFQ	(Chinese Taipei) Chang K-c (Chinese Taipei) Lu C-p	14	16
(China) Di ZJ (China) Wang C	21	21
(China) Huang KX (China) Liu C	21	21
PFQ	(Chinese Taipei) Lee F-c (Chinese Taipei) Lee F-j	18	17
7	(Malaysia) Goh V S (Malaysia) Tan W K	21	21
(Malaysia) Ong Y S (Malaysia) Teo E Y	16	17
Q2	(Chinese Taipei) Lin S-k (Chinese Taipei) Tseng M-h	10	17
(South Korea) Kim G-j (South Korea) Lee Y-d	21	21

Second Round
(China) Di ZJ (China) Wang C	21	12	21
(China) Huang KX (China) Liu C	14	21	16
7	(Malaysia) Goh V S (Malaysia) Tan W K	21	16	21
(South Korea) Kim G-j (South Korea) Lee Y-d	13	21	17

Quarter-finals
(China) Di ZJ (China) Wang C	21	15	16
7	(Malaysia) Goh V S (Malaysia) Tan W K	16	21	21

=== Bottom half ===
==== Section 3 ====
First Round
(Malaysia) A Chia (Malaysia) Soh W Y	21	21
(South Korea) Na S-s (South Korea) Wang C	13	14
(South Korea) Ko S-h (South Korea) Shin B-c
6	(Chinese Taipei) Lee Y (Chinese Taipei) Wang C-l	w	/	o
Q4	(South Korea) Choi H-b (South Korea) Park M-h	19	13
(Japan) T Inoue (Japan) Y Kaneko	21	21
(Chinese Taipei) Lee J-h (Chinese Taipei) Yang P-hs	21	22
4	(China) Han CK (China) Zhou HD	17	20

Second Round
(Malaysia) A Chia (Malaysia) Soh W Y	21	15	15
6	(Chinese Taipei) Lee Y (Chinese Taipei) Wang C-l	18	21	21
(Japan) T Inoue (Japan) Y Kaneko	14	14
(Chinese Taipei) Lee J-h (Chinese Taipei) Yang P-hs	21	21

Quarter-finals
6	(Chinese Taipei) Lee Y (Chinese Taipei) Wang C-l	21	22
(Chinese Taipei) Lee J-h (Chinese Taipei) Yang P-hs	18	20

==== Section 4 ====
First Round
(Chinese Taipei) Lu C-y (Chinese Taipei) Yang P-ha	22	23
(South Korea) Kang M-h (South Korea) Kim J-h	20	21
(China) Ou XY (China) Zhang N	21	21
5	(Denmark) K Astrup (Denmark) A S Rasmussen	16	17
PFQ	(South Korea) Kim W-h (South Korea) Park K-h	21	21
(Japan) H Okamura (Japan) M Onodera	19	19
Q1	(Hong Kong) Lee C H (Hong Kong) Tam C H	21	16	16
PFQ	(Denmark) M Pieler Kolding (Denmark) C Mogensen	15	21	21

Second Round
(Chinese Taipei) Lu C-y (Chinese Taipei) Yang P-ha	22	21	19
(China) Ou XY (China) Zhang N	24	18	21
PFQ	(South Korea) Kim W-h (South Korea) Park K-h	21	21
PFQ	(Denmark) M Pieler Kolding (Denmark) C Mogensen	11	16

Quarter-finals
(China) Ou XY (China) Zhang N	21	13
PFQ	(South Korea) Kim W-h (South Korea) Park K-h	23	21

== Women's doubles ==
=== Seeds ===
1. (Japan) Mayu Matsumoto / Wakana Nagahara (withdrew)
2. (China) Chen Qingchen / Jia Yifan (withdrew)
3. (Japan) Yuki Fukushima / Sayaka Hirota (withdrew)
4. (Japan) Misaki Matsutomo / Ayaka Takahashi (final)
5. (South Korea) Lee So-hee / Shin Seung-chan (semi-finals)
6. (China) Du Yue / Li Yinhui (withdrew)
7. (South Korea) Kim So-yeong / Kong Hee-yong (second round)
8. (Thailand) Jongkolphan Kititharakul / Rawinda Prajongjai (withdrew)

=== Finals ===
Semi-finals
(Chinese Taipei) Hsu Ya-ching (Chinese Taipei) Hu Ling-fang	19	16
(Japan) Nami Matsuyama (Japan) Chiharu Shida	21	21
4	(Japan) Misaki Matsutomo (Japan) Ayaka Takahashi	21	8	21
5	(South Korea) Lee So-hee (South Korea) Shin Seung-chan	14	21	17

Final
(Japan) Nami Matsuyama (Japan) Chiharu Shida	15	21	21
4	(Japan) Misaki Matsutomo (Japan) Ayaka Takahashi	21	17	18

=== Top half ===
==== Section 1 ====
First Round
PFQ	(South Korea) Jang E-s (South Korea) Jang H-j	w	/	o
Q2
PFQ	(Chinese Taipei) Chiang K-h (Chinese Taipei) Hung S-h	13	12
(Chinese Taipei) Hsu Y-c (Chinese Taipei) Hu L-f	21	21
PFQ	(South Korea) Go A-r (South Korea) Yoo C-r	21	21
(Denmark) M Fruergaard (Denmark) S Thygesen	15	5
(China) Liu XX (China) Xia YT	w	/	o
Q4

Second Round
PFQ	(South Korea) Jang E-s (South Korea) Jang H-j	12	22	16
(Chinese Taipei) Hsu Y-c (Chinese Taipei) Hu L-f	21	20	21
PFQ	(South Korea) Go A-r (South Korea) Yoo C-r	18	13
(China) Liu XX (China) Xia YT	21	21

Quarter-finals
(Chinese Taipei) Hsu Y-c (Chinese Taipei) Hu L-f	26	10	21
(China) Liu XX (China) Xia YT	24	21	17

==== Section 2 ====
First Round
PFQ	(Poland) W Adamek (Poland) M Swierczynska	9	7
PFR	(South Korea) Lee S-m (South Korea) Lee Y-l	21	21
(Malaysia) Chow M K (Malaysia) Lee M Y
(Japan) N Matsuyama (Japan) C Shida	w	/	o
7	(South Korea) Kim S-y (South Korea) Kong H-y	21	21
(Hong Kong) Ng W Y (Hong Kong) Yeung N T	14	8
(Chinese Taipei) Cheng C-y (Chinese Taipei) Lee C-c	20	8
(South Korea) Chang Y-n (South Korea) Kim H-r	22	21

Second Round
PFR	(South Korea) Lee S-m (South Korea) Lee Y-l	11	14
(Japan) N Matsuyama (Japan) C Shida	21	21
7	(South Korea) Kim S-y (South Korea) Kong H-y	21	16	15
(South Korea) Chang Y-n (South Korea) Kim H-r	18	21	21

Quarter-finals
(Japan) N Matsuyama (Japan) C Shida	21	20	21
(South Korea) Chang Y-n (South Korea) Kim H-r	13	22	16

=== Bottom half ===
==== Section 3 ====
First Round
Q3
(South Korea) Baek H-n (South Korea) Jung K-e	w	/	o
(Japan) A Araki (Japan) R Imai	21	21
PFQ	(Poland) A Goszczynska (Poland) K Szubert	8	11
(Hong Kong) Ng T Y (Hong Kong) Yuen S Y	11	18
(Japan) C Hoshi (Japan) A Matsuda	21	21
(South Korea) Jeong N-e (South Korea) Kim H-j	23	7
4	(Japan) M Matsutomo (Japan) A Takahashi	25	21

Second Round
(South Korea) Baek H-n (South Korea) Jung K-e	21	21
(Japan) A Araki (Japan) R Imai	10	12
(Japan) C Hoshi (Japan) A Matsuda	23	14
4	(Japan) M Matsutomo (Japan) A Takahashi	25	21

Quarter-finals
(South Korea) Baek H-n (South Korea) Jung K-e	21	13	12
4	(Japan) M Matsutomo (Japan) A Takahashi	10	21	21

==== Section 4 ====
First Round
(Australia) S Mapasa (Australia) G Somerville	22	21
PFQ	(Chinese Taipei) Liang T-y (Chinese Taipei) Lin S-y	20	18
(Chinese Taipei) Chang C-h (Chinese Taipei) Yang C-t	14	15
5	(South Korea) Lee S-h (South Korea) Shin S-c	21	21
Q1
(Bulgaria) G Stoeva (Bulgaria) S Stoeva	w	/	o
PFR	(South Korea) Seong S-y (South Korea) Yoon M-a	11	21	4
PFQ	(South Korea) Eom H-w (South Korea) Kim M-j	21	13	21

Second Round
(Australia) S Mapasa (Australia) G Somerville	21	11	17
5	(South Korea) Lee S-h (South Korea) Shin S-c	16	21	21
(Bulgaria) G Stoeva (Bulgaria) S Stoeva	21	14	21
(South Korea) Eom H-w (South Korea) Kim M-j	18	21	6

Quarter-finals
5	(South Korea) Lee S-h (South Korea) Shin S-c	21	22
(Bulgaria) G Stoeva (Bulgaria) S Stoeva	10	20

== Mixed doubles ==
=== Seeds ===
1. (Japan) Yuta Watanabe / Arisa Higashino (withdrew)
2. (Thailand) Dechapol Puavaranukroh / Sapsiree Taerattanachai (withdrew)
3. (South Korea) Seo Seung-jae / Chae Yoo-jung (quarter-finals)
4. (Malaysia) Chan Peng Soon / Goh Liu Ying (quarter-finals)
5. (Hong Kong) Tang Chun Man / Tse Ying Suet (champions)
6. (Malaysia) Goh Soon Huat / Shevon Jemie Lai (final)
7. (China) He Jiting / Du Yue (withdrew)
8. (Malaysia) Tan Kian Meng / Lai Pei Jing (second round)

=== Finals ===
Semi-finals
5	(Hong Kong) Tang Chun Man (Hong Kong) Tse Ying Suet	21	21
(Chinese Taipei) Yang Po-hsuan (Chinese Taipei) Hu Ling-fang	12	15
6	(Malaysia) Goh Soon Huat (Malaysia) Shevon Jemie Lai	21	21
(Chinese Taipei) Lee Jhe-huei (Chinese Taipei) Hsu Ya-ching	17	17

Final
5	(Hong Kong) Tang Chun Man (Hong Kong) Tse Ying Suet	21	21
6	(Malaysia) Goh Soon Huat (Malaysia) Shevon Jemie Lai	14	15

=== Top half ===
==== Section 1 ====
First Round
PFQ	(Hong Kong) Ho W L (Hong Kong) Yuen S Y	21	21
Q3	(Chinese Taipei) Lee F-c (Chinese Taipei) Lee C-c	15	19
(Chinese Taipei) Lee F-j (Chinese Taipei) Chang C-h	14	15
(Australia) S Leung W H (Australia) G Somerville	21	21
5	(Hong Kong) Tang C M (Hong Kong) Tse Y S	21	15	21
(Hong Kong) Chang T C (Hong Kong) Ng W Y	16	21	13
(Hong Kong) Yeung M N (Hong Kong) Ng T Y	17	19
PFQ	(South Korea) Park S-h (South Korea) Jang E-s	21	21

Second Round
PFQ	(Hong Kong) Ho W L (Hong Kong) Yuen S Y	21	21
(Australia) S Leung W H (Australia) G Somerville	18	13
5	(Hong Kong) Tang C M (Hong Kong) Tse Y S	21	21
PFQ	(South Korea) Park S-h (South Korea) Jang E-s	7	10

Quarter-finals
PFQ	(Hong Kong) Ho W L (Hong Kong) Yuen S Y	15	18
5	(Hong Kong) Tang C M (Hong Kong) Tse Y S	21	21

==== Section 2 ====
First Round
4	(Malaysia) Chan P S (Malaysia) Goh L Y	23	21
(Thailand) N Phuangphuapet (Thailand) S Amitrapai	21	16
(Denmark) N Nøhr (Denmark) S Thygesen	15	18
PFQ	(Japan) H Okamura (Japan) C Hoshi	21	21
PFQ	(South Korea) Wang C (South Korea) Jeong N-e	21	16	22
(Hong Kong) Law C H (Hong Kong) Yeung N T	17	21	20
(Chinese Taipei) Yang P-hs (Chinese Taipei) Hu L-f	21	21
Q2	(South Korea) Kang M-h (South Korea) Kim H-j	12	5

Second Round
4	(Malaysia) Chan P S (Malaysia) Goh L Y	16	21	21
PFQ	(Japan) H Okamura (Japan) C Hoshi	21	14	17
PFQ	(South Korea) Wang C (South Korea) Jeong N-e	17	10
(Chinese Taipei) Yang P-hs (Chinese Taipei) Hu L-f	21	21

Quarter-finals
4	(Malaysia) Chan P S (Malaysia) Goh L Y	17	16
(Chinese Taipei) Yang P-hs (Chinese Taipei) Hu L-f	21	21

=== Bottom half ===
==== Section 3 ====
First Round
Q4	(South Korea) Kim W-h (South Korea) Kim H-r	21	18	23
(China) Dong WJ (China) Chen XF	16	21	21
(Chinese Taipei) Wang C-l (Chinese Taipei) Cheng C-y	9	22	11
6	(Malaysia) Goh S H (Malaysia) S J Lai	21	20	21
(South Korea) Ko S-h (South Korea) Eom H-y	1^{r}
(United States) M Fogarty (United States) I Zhong	0
Q1	(South Korea) Choi H-b (South Korea) Yoon M-a	8	8
3	(South Korea) Seo S-j (South Korea) Chae Y-j	21	21

Second Round
Q4	(South Korea) Kim W-h (South Korea) Kim H-r	20	22	17
6	(Malaysia) Goh S H (Malaysia) S J Lai	22	20	21
(United States) M Fogarty (United States) I Zhong
3	(South Korea) Seo S-j (South Korea) Chae Y-j	w	/	o

Quarter-finals
6	(Malaysia) Goh S H (Malaysia) S J Lai	11	21	26
3	(South Korea) Seo S-j (South Korea) Chae Y-j	21	13	24

==== Section 4 ====
First Round
(Chinese Taipei) Lee J-h (Chinese Taipei) Hsu Y-c	21	20	21
(Chinese Taipei) Lee Y (Chinese Taipei) Yang C-t	19	22	15
(China) Ren XY (China) Zhou CM	10	16
8	(Malaysia) Tan K M (Malaysia) Lai P J	21	21
(South Korea) Choi S-g (South Korea) Shin S-c	21	21
(Japan) K Gondo (Japan) A Kurihara	15	16
PFQ	(South Korea) Na S-s (South Korea) Kim M-j	21	21
PFQ	(Poland) R Cybulski (Poland) W Adamek	16	18

Second Round
(Chinese Taipei) Lee J-h (Chinese Taipei) Hsu Y-c	16	24	27
8	(Malaysia) Tan K M (Malaysia) Lai P J	21	22	25
(South Korea) Choi S-g (South Korea) Shin S-c	21	21
PFQ	(South Korea) Na S-s (South Korea) Kim M-j	13	19

Quarter-finals
(Chinese Taipei) Lee J-h (Chinese Taipei) Hsu Y-c	21	15	21
(South Korea) Choi S-g (South Korea) Shin S-c	14	21	19

Preceded by 2019 Hong Kong Open	BWF World Tour; 2019 BWF season	Succeeded by 2019 Syed Modi International
