= 2019 Badminton Asia Mixed Team Championships squads =

This article lists the squads lists for badminton's 2019 Badminton Asia Mixed Team Championships. Rankings stated are per tournament prospectus based on BWF World Ranking for 19 February 2019.

== Group A ==
Group A consists of Japan and Hong Kong.

=== Japan ===
Name	DoB/Age	MS Rank	WS Rank	MD Rank	WD Rank	XD Rank
Arisa Higashino	1 August 1996 (aged 22)	–	–	–	214	3
Aya Ohori	2 October 1996 (aged 22)	–	21	–	–	–
Ayako Sakuramoto	19 August 1995 (aged 23)	–	–	–	9	–
Ayane Kurihara	27 September 1989 (aged 29)	–	–	–	181	31
Kanta Tsuneyama	21 June 1996 (aged 22)	18	–	–	–	–
Koharu Yonemoto	7 December 1990 (aged 28)	–	–	–	7	52
Kohei Gondo	27 December 1991 (aged 27)	–	–	–	–	31
Minoru Koga	30 September 1996 (aged 22)	110	–	–	–	–
Sayaka Takahashi	29 July 1992 (aged 26)	–	10	–	–	–
Shiho Tanaka	5 September 1992 (aged 26)	–	–	–	7	–
Takuro Hoki	14 August 1995 (aged 23)	–	–	27	–	47
Takuto Inoue	26 February 1995 (aged 24)	–	–	10	–	–
Yugo Kobayashi	10 July 1995 (aged 23)	–	–	27	–	68
Yuki Kaneko	22 July 1994 (aged 24)	–	–	10	–	55
Yukiko Takahata	18 March 1998 (aged 21)	–	–	–	9	293
Yuta Watanabe	13 June 1997 (aged 21)	–	–	5	–	3

=== Hong Kong ===
Name	DoB/Age	MS Rank	WS Rank	MD Rank	WD Rank	XD Rank
Chang Tak Ching	22 January 1995 (aged 24)	–	–	125	–	36
Chau Hoi Wah	5 June 1986 (aged 32)	–	–	–	–	24
Cheung Ngan Yi	27 April 1993 (aged 25)	–	31	–	–	–
Ho Wai Lun		–	–	123	–	116
Lee Cheuk Yiu	28 August 1996 (aged 22)	36	–	–	–	–
Mak Hee Chun	28 August 1990 (aged 28)	–	–	123	–	54
Ng Ka Long	24 June 1994 (aged 24)	15	–	–	–	–
Ng Tsz Yau	24 April 1998 (aged 20)	–	–	–	30	110
Ng Wing Yung	17 May 1995 (aged 23)	–	–	–	38	36
Tam Chun Hei	2 August 1993 (aged 25)	–	–	58	–	172
Tang Chun Man	20 March 1995 (aged 23)	–	–	197	–	8
Tse Ying Suet	9 November 1991 (aged 27)	–	–	–	–	8
Yeung Ming Nok	22 December 1995 (aged 23)	–	–	125	–	110
Yeung Nga Ting	13 October 1998 (aged 20)	–	–	–	38	54
Yip Pui Yin	6 August 1987 (aged 31)	–	37	–	–	–
Yuen Sin Ying	13 January 1994 (aged 25)	–	–	–	30	116

== Group B ==
Group B consists of Chinese Taipei, India and Singapore.

=== Chinese Taipei ===
Name	DoB/Age	MS Rank	WS Rank	MD Rank	WD Rank	XD Rank
Chang Ching-hui	17 May 1996 (aged 22)	–	–	–	59	66
Chen Su-yu	19 December 1997 (aged 21)	–	76	–	175	–
Hsieh Pei-shan	22 November 1997 (aged 21)	–	–	–	151	170
Lee Chia-hao	4 June 1999 (aged 19)	159	–	665	–	563
Liang Ting-yu	3 January 1998 (aged 21)	–	86	–	444	563
Liao Min-chun	27 January 1988 (aged 31)	–	–	11	–	89
Lin Jhih-yun	13 September 1999 (aged 19)	–	747	–	133	164
Lu Ching-yao	7 June 1993 (aged 25)	–	–	25	–	86
Pai Yu-po	18 April 1991 (aged 27)	–	46	–	173	–
Su Ching-heng	10 November 1992 (aged 26)	–	–	11	–	513
Tseng Min-hao	15 June 1988 (aged 30)	–	–	66	–	164
Wang Tzu-wei	27 February 1995 (aged 24)	30	–	–	–	–
Wu Ti-jung	23 February 1993 (aged 26)	–	–	–	26	137
Yang Chih-chieh	10 December 1991 (aged 27)	90	–	421	–	–
Yang Ching-tun	17 November 1995 (aged 23)	–	–	–	59	175
Yang Po-han	13 March 1994 (aged 25)	–	–	25	–	–

=== India ===
Name	DoB/Age	MS Rank	WS Rank	MD Rank	WD Rank	XD Rank
Arathi Sara Sunil	1 October 1994 (aged 24)	–	–	–	86	446
Arjun M.R.	11 May 1997 (aged 21)	–	–	41	–	104
Arun George	8 November 1995 (aged 23)	–	–	59	–	–
Ashmita Chaliha	18 October 1999 (aged 19)	–	180	–	–	–
Ashwini Bhat K.	10 January 2000 (aged 19)	–	–	–	–	–
Prannoy Kumar	7 July 1992 (aged 26)	19	–	–	–	–
Mithula UK	5 July 2000 (aged 18)	–	–	–	646	–
Ramchandran Shlok	10 March 1995 (aged 24)	–	–	41	–	–
Rutaparna Panda	7 May 1999 (aged 19)	–	–	–	86	333
Sanyam Shukla	19 April 1996 (aged 22)	–	–	59	–	513
Shikha Gautam	18 April 1998 (aged 20)	–	155	–	–	–
Sourabh Verma	30 December 1992 (aged 26)	56	–	–	–	–
Vaishnavi Bhale	30 July 1996 (aged 22)	–	–	–	–	–

=== Singapore ===
Name	DoB/Age	MS Rank	WS Rank	MD Rank	WD Rank	XD Rank
Abel Tan Wen Xing	3 October 2000 (aged 18)	–	–	366	–	–
Citra Putri Sari Dewi	2 August 1996 (aged 22)	–	–	–	61	96
Crystal Wong	2 August 1999 (aged 19)	–	–	–	192	61
Danny Bawa Chrisnanta	30 December 1988 (aged 30)	–	–	68	–	61
Jaslyn Hooi Yue Yann	5 October 2000 (aged 18)	–	257	–	317	–
Jin Yujia	6 February 1997 (aged 22)	–	–	–	61	79
Joel Koh Jia Wei	23 November 2000 (aged 18)	300	–	–	–	–
Lee Wei Hong	27 June 2000 (aged 18)	–	–	–	–	–
Lim Ming Hui	5 December 1999 (aged 19)	–	747	–	220	473
Loh Kean Hean	12 March 1995 (aged 24)	–	–	211	–	–
Loh Kean Yew	26 June 1997 (aged 21)	69	–	–	–	–
Muhamad Imran Khan	29 July 1996 (aged 22)	306	–	–	–	–
Sito Jia Rong	23 June 2000 (aged 18)	–	747	–	819	–
Tan Wei Han	16 July 1993 (aged 25)	–	–	–	–	128
Toh Han Zhuo	22 December 2000 (aged 18)	–	–	366	–	1359
Yeo Jia Min	1 February 1999 (aged 20)	–	42	–	–	–

== Group C ==
Group C consists of Indonesia, Thailand and Sri Lanka.

=== Indonesia ===
Name	DoB/Age	MS Rank	WS Rank	MD Rank	WD Rank	XD Rank
Alfian Eko Prasetya	4 August 1994 (aged 24)	–	–	–	–	26
Della Destiara Haris	8 December 1992 (aged 26)	–	–	–	12	398
Fajar Alfian	7 March 1996 (aged 23)	–	–	9	–	–
Fitriani	27 December 1998 (aged 20)	–	30	–	–	–
Frengky Wijaya Putra	24 April 1997 (aged 21)	–	–	45	–	–
Ihsan Maulana Mustofa	18 November 1995 (aged 23)	42	–	–	–	–
Marsheilla Gischa Islami	25 March 1997 (aged 21)	–	–	–	–	26
Muhammad Rian Ardianto	13 February 1996 (aged 23)	–	–	9	–	–
Ni Ketut Mahadewi Istarani	12 September 1994 (aged 24)	–	–	–	34	–
Rizki Amelia Pradipta	1 September 1990 (aged 28)	–	–	–	12	–
Ruselli Hartawan	27 December 1997 (aged 21)	–	45	–	419	–
Sabar Karyaman Gutama	8 January 1996 (aged 23)	–	–	45	–	–
Shesar Hiren Rhustavito	3 March 1994 (aged 25)	53	–	–	–	–
Tania Oktaviani Kusumah	13 October 1999 (aged 19)	–	–	–	51	–
Tontowi Ahmad	18 July 1987 (aged 31)	–	–	–	–	283
Winny Oktavina Kandow	14 October 1998 (aged 20)	–	–	–	156	28

=== Thailand ===
Name	DoB/Age	MS Rank	WS Rank	MD Rank	WD Rank	XD Rank
Chayanit Chaladchalam	8 March 1991 (aged 28)	–	–	–	21	–
Inkarat Apisuk	7 April 1993 (aged 25)	–	–	48	–	–
Jongkolphan Kititharakul	1 March 1993 (aged 26)	–	–	–	10	283
Kantaphon Wangcharoen	18 September 1998 (aged 20)	17	–	–	–	–
Khosit Phetpradab	8 July 1994 (aged 24)	16	–	–	–	–
Nipitphon Phuangphuapet	31 May 1991 (aged 27)	–	–	79	–	19
Nitchaon Jindapol	31 March 1991 (aged 27)	–	17	–	–	–
Phataimas Muenwong	5 July 1995 (aged 23)	–	–	–	21	–
Pornpawee Chochuwong	22 January 1998 (aged 21)	–	23	–	–	–
Rawinda Prajongjai	29 June 1993 (aged 25)	–	–	–	10	–
Savitree Amitrapai	19 November 1988 (aged 30)	–	–	–	67	19
Sitthikom Thammasin	7 April 1995 (aged 23)	38	–	–	–	–
Supanida Katethong	26 October 1997 (aged 21)	–	83	–	–	217
Suppanyu Avihingsanon	24 October 1989 (aged 29)	25	–	–	–	–
Tanupat Viriyangkura	10 March 1996 (aged 23)	–	–	48	–	180
Tinn Isriyanet	7 July 1993 (aged 25)	–	–	32	–	99

=== Sri Lanka ===
Name	DoB/Age	MS Rank	WS Rank	MD Rank	WD Rank	XD Rank
Buwaneka Goonethilleka	8 May 1996 (aged 22)	639	–	190	–	–
Dilmi Dias	4 May 2001 (aged 17)	–	–	–	–	–
Dinuka Karunaratne	6 October 1987 (aged 31)	174	–	139	–	–
Kavidi Sirimannage	27 September 1995 (aged 23)	–	209	–	132	–
Sachin Dias	18 July 1996 (aged 22)	–	–	–	190	224
Thilini Pramodika Hendahewa	18 September 1996 (aged 22)	–	260	–	132	224

== Group D ==
Group D consists of China, Malaysia and Macau.

=== China ===
Name	DoB/Age	MS Rank	WS Rank	MD Rank	WD Rank	XD Rank
Cai Yanyan	15 November 1999 (aged 19)	–	20	–	–	–
Chen Xiaofei	10 October 1997 (aged 21)	–	–	–	–	–
Dong Wenjing	15 June 1998 (aged 20)	–	–	–	36	305
Du Yue	15 February 1998 (aged 21)	–	–	–	11	13
Feng Xueying	19 December 1998 (aged 20)	–	–	–	36	67
Han Chengkai	29 January 1998 (aged 21)	–	–	8	–	–
Han Yue	18 November 1999 (aged 19)	–	16	–	–	–
He Jiting	19 February 1998 (aged 21)	–	–	14	–	13
Li Yinhui	11 March 1997 (aged 22)	–	–	–	11	7
Lu Guangzu	19 October 1996 (aged 22)	20	–	–	–	–
Ou Xuanyi	23 January 1994 (aged 25)	–	–	24	–	67
Tan Qiang	16 September 1998 (aged 20)	–	–	14	–	–
Zhao Junpeng	2 February 1996 (aged 23)	43	–	–	–	–
Zhou Haodong	20 February 1998 (aged 21)	–	–	8	–	–

=== Malaysia ===
Name	DoB/Age	MS Rank	WS Rank	MD Rank	WD Rank	XD Rank
Anna Cheong Ching Yik	15 March 1998 (aged 21)	–	–	–	225	1335
Cheah Yee See	18 November 1995 (aged 23)	–	–	–	230	53
Cheam June Wei	23 January 1997 (aged 22)	72	–	–	–	–
Chen Tang Jie	5 January 1998 (aged 21)	–	–	114	–	35
Goh Sze Fei	18 August 1997 (aged 21)	–	–	52	–	–
Ho Yen Mei	29 April 1996 (aged 22)	–	177	–	–	–
Hoo Pang Ron	29 March 1998 (aged 20)	–	–	259	–	53
Lee Ying Ying	25 October 1997 (aged 21)	–	58	–	–	–
Lim Chiew Sien	14 May 1994 (aged 24)	–	–	–	52	–
Low Hang Yee	22 February 1997 (aged 22)	–	–	169	–	–
Ng Eng Cheong	2 June 1999 (aged 19)	–	–	169	–	–
Nur Izzuddin Mohd Rumsani	11 November 1997 (aged 21)	–	–	52	–	–
Pearly Tan Koong Le	14 March 2000 (aged 19)	–	–	–	646	–
Peck Yen Wei	10 February 1996 (aged 23)	–	–	–	230	35
Soong Joo Ven	19 May 1995 (aged 23)	81	–	–	–	–
Teoh Mei Xing	6 March 1997 (aged 22)	–	–	–	269	627

=== Macau ===
Name	DoB/Age	MS Rank	WS Rank	MD Rank	WD Rank	XD Rank
Ao Fei Long	2 February 2002 (aged 17)	–	–	–	–	–
Ao I Kuan	9 October 1999 (aged 19)	–	747	–	341	–
Gong Xue Xin	12 October 1999 (aged 19)	–	506	–	118	283
Iek U Ieong	24 April 1998 (aged 20)	866	–	627	–	627
Kuan Chi Leng	19 September 1998 (aged 20)	–	–	–	341	–
Leong Iok Chong	8 February 2002 (aged 17)	–	–	627	–	995
Ng Weng Chi	31 March 1998 (aged 20)	–	294	–	118	627
Pui Chi Chon	27 April 2003 (aged 15)	–	–	–	–	–
Pui Chi Wa	1 February 2005 (aged 14)	–	–	–	–	–
Pui Pang Fong	13 March 2000 (aged 19)	346	–	381	–	–
