= 2021 Denmark Open =

Tournament details
- Dates: 19–24 October
- Level: Super 1000
- Total prize money: US$850,000
- Venue: Odense Sports Park
- Location: Odense, Denmark

Champions
- Men's singles: (Denmark) Viktor Axelsen
- Women's singles: (Japan) Akane Yamaguchi
- Men's doubles: (Japan) Takuro Hoki (Japan) Yugo Kobayashi
- Women's doubles: (China) Huang Dongping (China) Zheng Yu
- Mixed doubles: (Japan) Yuta Watanabe (Japan) Arisa Higashino

The 2021 Denmark Open (officially known as the Victor Denmark Open 2021 for sponsorship reasons) was a badminton tournament which took place at the Odense Sports Park in Odense, Denmark, from 19 to 24 October 2021 and had a total prize of US$850,000.

The tournament which originally was a Super 750 event later got upgraded to a Super 1000 event in 2021.

== Tournament ==
The 2021 Denmark Open was the fifth tournament according to the 2021 BWF World Tour as many tournaments got canceled due to the COVID-19 pandemic. It was a part of the Denmark Open, which had been held since 1935. This tournament was organized by Badminton Denmark with sanction from the BWF.

=== Venue ===
This international tournament was held at the Odense Sports Park in Odense, Denmark.

=== Point distribution ===
Below is the point distribution table for each phase of the tournament based on the BWF points system for the BWF World Tour Super 1000 event.

Winner	Runner-up	3/4	5/8	9/16	17/32
12,000	10,200	8,400	6,600	4,800	3,000

=== Prize money ===
The total prize money for this tournament was US$850,000. Distribution of prize money was in accordance with BWF regulations.

Event	Winner	Finals	Semi-finals	Quarter-finals	Last 16	Last 32
Singles	$59,500	$28,900	$11,900	$4,675	$2,550	$850
Doubles	$62,900	$29,750	$11,900	$5,312.50	$2,762.50	$850

== Men's singles ==
=== Seeds ===
1. (Japan) Kento Momota (final)
2. (Denmark) Viktor Axelsen (champion)
3. (Denmark) Anders Antonsen (second round)
4. (Chinese Taipei) Chou Tien-chen (quarter-finals)
5. (Indonesia) Anthony Sinisuka Ginting (first round)
6. (Indonesia) Jonatan Christie (quarter-finals)
7. (Malaysia) Lee Zii Jia (quarter-finals)
8. (Hong Kong) Ng Ka Long (second round)

=== Finals ===
Semi-finals
1	(Japan) Kento Momota	21	21
(Indonesia) Tommy Sugiarto	7	12
(Hong Kong) Lee Cheuk Yiu	9	11
2	(Denmark) Viktor Axelsen	21	21

Final
1	(Japan) Kento Momota	22	18	12
2	(Denmark) Viktor Axelsen	20	21	21

=== Top half ===
==== Section 1 ====
First Round
1	(Japan) K Momota	21	21
(France) T J Popov	12	15
(India) B. Sai Praneeth	14	11
(India) S Kidambi	21	21
6	(Indonesia) J Christie	21	21
(India) Prannoy K	18	19
(Japan) K Tsuneyama	21	21	21
(South Korea) Heo K-h	23	14	18

Second Round
1	(Japan) K Momota	23	21
(India) S Kidambi	21	9
6	(Indonesia) J Christie	21	21
(Japan) K Tsuneyama	11	9

Quarter-finals
1	(Japan) K Momota	21	15
6	(Indonesia) J Christie	13	0^{r}

==== Section 2 ====
First Round
3	(Denmark) A Antonsen	21	22
(Denmark) R Gemke	16	20
(India) Sa Verma	21	21
(Thailand) K Vitidsarn	17	14
5	(Indonesia) A S Ginting	1^{r}
PFR	(France) T Rouxel	4
(Indonesia) T Sugiarto	21	21
(Thailand) K Wangcharoen	14	8

Second Round
3	(Denmark) A Antonsen	14	18
(India) Sa Verma	21	21
PFR	(France) T Rouxel	18	21	19
(Indonesia) T Sugiarto	21	16	21

Quarter-finals
(India) Sa Verma	17^{r}
(Indonesia) T Sugiarto	21

=== Bottom half ===
==== Section 3 ====
First Round
(Hong Kong) Lee C Y	22	21
(Indonesia) S H Rhustavito	20	15
(Japan) K Nishimoto	20	19
8	(Hong Kong) Ng K L	22	21
(China) Lu GZ	21	21	21
(France) B Leverdez	23	10	6
(India) Parupalli K	0^{r}
4	(Chinese Taipei) Chou T-c	3

Second Round
(Hong Kong) Lee C Y	21	18	21
8	(Hong Kong) Ng K L	16	21	8
(China) Lu GZ	15	18
4	(Chinese Taipei) Chou T-c	21	21

Quarter-finals
(Hong Kong) Lee C Y	21	19	21
4	(Chinese Taipei) Chou T-c	16	21	19

==== Section 4 ====
First Round
(Malaysia) Liew D	21	23
(Denmark) H-K Vittinghus	18	21
(Chinese Taipei) Wang T-w	21	9	18
7	(Malaysia) Lee Z J	12	21	21
(India) So Verma	9	7
(India) L Sen	21	21
PFR	(Singapore) Loh K Y	19	14
2	(Denmark) V Axelsen	21	21

Second Round
(Malaysia) Liew D	11	14
7	(Malaysia) Lee Z J	21	21
(India) L Sen	15	7
2	(Denmark) V Axelsen	21	21

Quarter-finals
7	(Malaysia) Lee Z J	19	19
2	(Denmark) V Axelsen	21	21

== Women's singles ==
=== Seeds ===
1. (China) Chen Yufei (withdrew)
2. (Japan) Akane Yamaguchi (champion)
3. (Thailand) Ratchanok Intanon (first round)
4. (India) P. V. Sindhu (quarter-finals)
5. (South Korea) An Se-young (final)
6. (China) He Bingjiao (semi-finals)
7. (Thailand) Pornpawee Chochuwong (quarter-finals)
8. (Canada) Michelle Li (withdrew)

=== Finals ===
Semi-finals
(Scotland) Kirsty Gilmour	13	21	16
5	(South Korea) An Se-young	21	12	21
6	(China) He Bingjiao	21	20
2	(Japan) Akane Yamaguchi	23	22

Final
5	(South Korea) An Se-young	21	23	5^{r}
2	(Japan) Akane Yamaguchi	18	25	16

=== Top half ===
==== Section 1 ====
First Round
PFR	(Estonia) K Kuuba	11	15
(Scotland) K Gilmour	21	21
(Thailand) S Katethong	19	8
(South Korea) Kim G-e	21	21
PFR	(Spain) C Azurmendi	11
(France) Qi XF	1^{r}
(Belgium) L Tan	16	15
(Denmark) M Blichfeldt	21	21

Second Round
(Scotland) K Gilmour	21	20	26
(South Korea) Kim G-e	18	22	24
PFR	(Spain) C Azurmendi	21	21
(Denmark) M Blichfeldt	12	18

Quarter-finals
(Scotland) K Gilmour	21	18	21
PFR	(Spain) C Azurmendi	15	21	11

==== Section 2 ====
First Round
4	(India) P. V. Sindhu	21	21
(Turkey) N Yiğit	12	10
(Thailand) B Ongbamrungphan	21	21
(Indonesia) R Hartawan	15	17
5	(South Korea) An S-y	21	21
(Germany) Y Li	12	17
(Russia) E Kosetskaya	21	21
(Chinese Taipei) Pai Y-p	10	19

Second Round
4	(India) P. V. Sindhu	21	12	21
(Thailand) B Ongbamrungphan	16	21	15
5	(South Korea) An S-y	21	21
(Russia) E Kosetskaya	9	11

Quarter-finals
4	(India) P. V. Sindhu	11	12
5	(South Korea) An S-y	21	21

=== Bottom half ===
==== Section 3 ====
First Round
(China) Han Y	21	18	16
(Japan) S Takahashi	15	21	21
(Singapore) Yeo J M	14	17
6	(China) He BJ	21	21
(United States) I Wang	19	20
(China) Wang ZY	21	22
(Thailand) P Chaiwan	21	21
3	(Thailand) R Intanon	14	17

Second Round
(Japan) S Takahashi	14	14
6	(China) He BJ	21	21
(China) Wang ZY	21	21
(Thailand) P Chaiwan	17	6

Quarter-finals
6	(China) He BJ	21	21
(China) Wang ZY	16	14

==== Section 4 ====
First Round
(Japan) A Ohori	21	21
(India) S Nehwal	16	14
(Denmark) L Christophersen	10	13
7	(Thailand) P Chochuwong	21	21
(Indonesia) G M Tunjung	21	21
(Denmark) J D Jakobsen	9	12
(Denmark) L Kjærsfeldt	23	16	9
2	(Japan) A Yamaguchi	21	21	21

Second Round
(Japan) A Ohori	6	15
7	(Thailand) P Chochuwong	21	21
(Indonesia) G M Tunjung	13	15
2	(Japan) A Yamaguchi	21	21

Quarter-finals
7	(Thailand) P Chochuwong	21	13	11
2	(Japan) A Yamaguchi	17	21	21

== Men's doubles ==
=== Seeds ===
1. (Indonesia) Marcus Fernaldi Gideon / Kevin Sanjaya Sukamuljo (second round)
2. (Indonesia) Mohammad Ahsan / Hendra Setiawan (first round)
3. (Chinese Taipei) Lee Yang / Wang Chi-lin (second round)
4. (Indonesia) Fajar Alfian / Muhammad Rian Ardianto (quarter-finals)
5. (Malaysia) Aaron Chia / Soh Wooi Yik (second round)
6. (South Korea) Choi Sol-gyu / Seo Seung-jae (withdrew)
7. (India) Satwiksairaj Rankireddy / Chirag Shetty (second round)
8. (Denmark) Kim Astrup / Anders Skaarup Rasmussen (final)

=== Finals ===
Semi-finals
8	(Denmark) Kim Astrup (Denmark) Anders Skaarup Rasmussen	21	19	21
(Malaysia) Goh Sze Fei (Malaysia) Nur Izzuddin	11	21	18
(Japan) Takuro Hoki (Japan) Yugo Kobayashi	20	21	21
(Germany) Mark Lamsfuß (Germany) Marvin Seidel	22	18	16

Final
8	(Denmark) Kim Astrup (Denmark) Anders Skaarup Rasmussen	18	12
(Japan) Takuro Hoki (Japan) Yugo Kobayashi	21	21

=== Top half ===
==== Section 1 ====
First Round
1	(Indonesia) M F Gideon (Indonesia) K S Sukamuljo	21	21
(France) C Popov (France) T J Popov	14	19
(Indonesia) M S Fikri (Indonesia) B Maulana	21	21
(China) Di ZJ (China) Wang C	6	19
8	(Denmark) K Astrup (Denmark) A S Rasmussen	21	21
(Denmark) D Lundgaard (Denmark) M Thyrri	7	14
(Indonesia) P Kusumawardana (Indonesia) Y Rambitan	21	21
PFR	(Germany) J Jansen (Germany) J Völker	15	19

Second Round
1	(Indonesia) M F Gideon (Indonesia) K S Sukamuljo	21	17	21
(Indonesia) M S Fikri (Indonesia) B Maulana	17	21	23
8	(Denmark) K Astrup (Denmark) A S Rasmussen	21	21
(Indonesia) P Kusumawardana (Indonesia) Y Rambitan	15	18

Quarter-finals
(Indonesia) M S Fikri (Indonesia) B Maulana	21	11	17
8	(Denmark) K Astrup (Denmark) A S Rasmussen	19	21	21

==== Section 2 ====
First Round
4	(Indonesia) F Alfian (Indonesia) M R Ardianto	21	21
(Chinese Taipei) Lu C-y (Chinese Taipei) Yang P-ha	18	18
(England) B Lane (England) S Vendy	19	15
(India) Arjun M.R. (India) D Kapila	21	21
7	(India) S Rankireddy (India) C Shetty	23	21
(England) C Hemming (England) S Stallwood	21	15
(Malaysia) Goh S F (Malaysia) N Izzuddin	21	21
(India) M Attri (India) B. S Reddy	18	11

Second Round
4	(Indonesia) F Alfian (Indonesia) M R Ardianto	21	17	21
(India) Arjun M.R. (India) D Kapila	15	21	12
7	(India) S Rankireddy (India) C Shetty	21	15	15
(Malaysia) Goh S F (Malaysia) N Izzuddin	14	21	21

Quarter-finals
4	(Indonesia) F Alfian (Indonesia) M R Ardianto	18	17
(Malaysia) Goh S F (Malaysia) N Izzuddin	21	21

=== Bottom half ===
==== Section 3 ====
First Round
(Japan) K Matsui (Japan) Y Takeuchi	18	21	14
(Japan) A Koga (Japan) T Saito	21	19	21
(Netherlands) R Jille (Netherlands) T van der Lecq	17	9
5	(Malaysia) A Chia (Malaysia) Soh W Y	21	21
(China) He JT (China) Tan Q	13	10
(Japan) T Hoki (Japan) Y Kobayashi	21	21
(Malaysia) Goh V S (Malaysia) Low J S	14	18
3	(Chinese Taipei) Lee Y (Chinese Taipei) Wang C-l	21	21

Second Round
(Japan) A Koga (Japan) T Saito	21	21
5	(Malaysia) A Chia (Malaysia) Soh W Y	19	13
(Japan) T Hoki (Japan) Y Kobayashi	21	21
3	(Chinese Taipei) Lee Y (Chinese Taipei) Wang C-l	19	17

Quarter-finals
(Japan) A Koga (Japan) T Saito	18	17
(Japan) T Hoki (Japan) Y Kobayashi	21	21

==== Section 4 ====
First Round
(Denmark) J Eipe (Denmark) R Kjær	12	18^{r}
(Malaysia) Ong Y S (Malaysia) Teo E Y	21	18
(Scotland) A Dunn (Scotland) A Hall	21	21
PFR	(France) L Corvée (France) R Labar	14	14
(Chinese Taipei) Lee J-h (Chinese Taipei) Yang P-hs	21	21
(Indonesia) L R Carnando (Indonesia) D Marthin	19	19
(Germany) M Lamsfuß (Germany) M Seidel	21	21
2	(Indonesia) M Ahsan (Indonesia) H Setiawan	17	13

Second Round
(Malaysia) Ong Y S (Malaysia) Teo E Y	21	21
(Scotland) A Dunn (Scotland) A Hall	17	11
(Chinese Taipei) Lee J-h (Chinese Taipei) Yang P-hs	18	13
(Germany) M Lamsfuß (Germany) M Seidel	21	21

Quarter-finals
(Malaysia) Ong Y S (Malaysia) Teo E Y	18	19
(Germany) M Lamsfuß (Germany) M Seidel	21	21

== Women's doubles ==
=== Seeds ===
1. (China) Chen Qingchen / Jia Yifan (first round)
2. (South Korea) Lee So-hee / Shin Seung-chan (final)
3. (South Korea) Kim So-yeong / Kong Hee-yong (semi-finals)
4. (Indonesia) Greysia Polii / Apriyani Rahayu (quarter-finals)
5. (Thailand) Jongkolphan Kititharakul / Rawinda Prajongjai (semi-finals)
6. (Japan) Nami Matsuyama / Chiharu Shida (first round)
7. (Bulgaria) Gabriela Stoeva / Stefani Stoeva (second round)
8. (England) Chloe Birch / Lauren Smith (first round)

=== Finals ===
Semi-finals
5	(Thailand) Jongkolphan Kititharakul (Thailand) Rawinda Prajongjai	10	15
(China) Huang Dongping (China) Zheng Yu	21	21
3	(South Korea) Kim So-yeong (South Korea) Kong Hee-yong	21	18	16
2	(South Korea) Lee So-hee (South Korea) Shin Seung-chan	16	21	21

Final
(China) Huang Dongping (China) Zheng Yu	21	21
2	(South Korea) Lee So-hee (South Korea) Shin Seung-chan	15	17

=== Top half ===
==== Section 1 ====
First Round
1	(China) Chen QC (China) Jia YF	1^{r}
(Denmark) A Magelund (Denmark) F Ravn	5
(France) M Lambert (France) A Tran	18	15
(China) Du Y (China) Li WM	21	21
5	(Thailand) J Kititharakul (Thailand) R Prajongjai	21	21
(Chinese Taipei) Hsu Y-c (Chinese Taipei) Hu L-f	19	16
(Thailand) B Aimsaard (Thailand) N Aimsaard	21	21
(Malaysia) Lee M Y (Malaysia) Yap C W	12	15

Second Round
(Denmark) A Magelund (Denmark) F Ravn	13	7
(China) Du Y (China) Li WM	21	21
5	(Thailand) J Kititharakul (Thailand) R Prajongjai	21	21
(Thailand) B Aimsaard (Thailand) N Aimsaard	13	14

Quarter-finals
(China) Du Y (China) Li WM	19	13
5	(Thailand) J Kititharakul (Thailand) R Prajongjai	21	21

==== Section 2 ====
First Round
4	(Indonesia) G Polii (Indonesia) A Rahayu	17	21	21
(Malaysia) P Tan (Malaysia) Thinaah M	21	13	14
(Denmark) M Fruergaard (Denmark) S Thygesen	21	21
(Malaysia) V Hoo (Malaysia) Lim C S	15	16
7	(Bulgaria) G Stoeva (Bulgaria) S Stoeva	17	21	21
(Denmark) J Finne-Ipsen (Denmark) M Surrow	21	14	18
(Denmark) C Busch (Denmark) A Schulz	6	9
(China) Huang DP (China) Zheng Y	21	21

Second Round
4	(Indonesia) G Polii (Indonesia) A Rahayu	21	21
(Denmark) M Fruergaard (Denmark) S Thygesen	13	16
7	(Bulgaria) G Stoeva (Bulgaria) S Stoeva	21	11	17
(China) Huang DP (China) Zheng Y	17	21	21

Quarter-finals
4	(Indonesia) G Polii (Indonesia) A Rahayu	21	10	13
(China) Huang DP (China) Zheng Y	14	21	21

=== Bottom half ===
==== Section 3 ====
First Round
(Canada) R Honderich (Canada) K Tsai	11	19
(China) Liu XX (China) Xia YT	21	21
(Netherlands) A Tirtosentono (Netherlands) I van der Aar	4
6	(Japan) N Matsuyama (Japan) C Shida	7^{r}
(Indonesia) S F S Ramadhanti (Indonesia) R Sugiarto	14	17
(Japan) Y Fukushima (Japan) A Higashino	21	21
(Scotland) J MacPherson (Scotland) C Torrance	8	12
3	(South Korea) Kim S-y (South Korea) Kong H-y	21	21

Second Round
(China) Liu XX (China) Xia YT	21	21
(Netherlands) A Tirtosentono (Netherlands) I van der Aar	10	11
(Japan) Y Fukushima (Japan) A Higashino	12	12
3	(South Korea) Kim S-y (South Korea) Kong H-y	21	21

Quarter-finals
(China) Liu XX (China) Xia YT	11	17
3	(South Korea) Kim S-y (South Korea) Kong H-y	21	21

==== Section 4 ====
First Round
PFR	(Spain) C Azurmendi (Spain) B Corrales	17	17
(Sweden) J Magnusson (Sweden) C Nistad	21	21
(Thailand) P Supajirakul (Thailand) S Taerattanachai	21	21
8	(England) C Birch (England) L Smith	15	7
(India) M Jakkampudi (India) P S. Ram	8	7
(Indonesia) N V Marwah (Indonesia) P Syaikah	21	21
(India) A Ponnappa (India) N. S Reddy	17	13
2	(South Korea) Lee S-h (South Korea) Shin S-c	21	21

Second Round
(Sweden) J Magnusson (Sweden) C Nistad	9	18
(Thailand) P Supajirakul (Thailand) S Taerattanachai	21	21
(Indonesia) N V Marwah (Indonesia) P Syaikah	21	18	15
2	(South Korea) Lee S-h (South Korea) Shin S-c	15	21	21

Quarter-finals
(Thailand) P Supajirakul (Thailand) S Taerattanachai	18	21
2	(South Korea) Lee S-h (South Korea) Shin S-c	21	23

== Mixed doubles ==
=== Seeds ===
1. (China) Wang Yilyu / Huang Dongping (semi-finals)
2. (Thailand) Dechapol Puavaranukroh / Sapsiree Taerattanachai (final)
3. (Indonesia) Praveen Jordan / Melati Daeva Oktavianti (semi-finals)
4. (Japan) Yuta Watanabe / Arisa Higashino (champions)
5. (South Korea) Seo Seung-jae / Chae Yoo-jung (withdrew)
6. (England) Marcus Ellis / Lauren Smith (second round)
7. (Malaysia) Chan Peng Soon / Goh Liu Ying (first round)
8. (Indonesia) Hafiz Faizal / Gloria Emanuelle Widjaja (first round)

=== Finals ===
Semi-finals
1	(China) Wang Yilyu (China) Huang Dongping	21	17	17
4	(Japan) Yuta Watanabe (Japan) Arisa Higashino	16	21	21
3	(Indonesia) Praveen Jordan (Indonesia) Melati Daeva Oktavianti	21	17	20
2	(Thailand) Dechapol Puavaranukroh (Thailand) Sapsiree Taerattanachai	16	21	22

Final
4	(Japan) Yuta Watanabe (Japan) Arisa Higashino	21	21
2	(Thailand) Dechapol Puavaranukroh (Thailand) Sapsiree Taerattanachai	18	9

=== Top half ===
==== Section 1 ====
First Round
1	(China) Wang YL (China) Huang DP	21	21
(Netherlands) R Tabeling (Netherlands) S Piek	6	7
(Thailand) S Jomkoh (Thailand) S Paewsampran	24	15	16
(France) T Gicquel (France) D Delrue	22	21	21
PFR	(India) D Kapila (India) N. S Reddy	14	21	21
(Malaysia) Hoo P R (Malaysia) Cheah Y S	21	17	18
(Hong Kong) Tang C M (Hong Kong) Tse Y S	21	21
(Chinese Taipei) Yang P-hs (Chinese Taipei) Hu L-f	15	15

Second Round
1	(China) Wang YL (China) Huang DP	23	21
(France) T Gicquel (France) D Delrue	21	10
PFR	(India) D Kapila (India) N. S Reddy	17	21	11
(Hong Kong) Tang C M (Hong Kong) Tse Y S	21	19	21

Quarter-finals
1	(China) Wang YL (China) Huang DP	21	21
(Hong Kong) Tang C M (Hong Kong) Tse Y S	14	17

==== Section 2 ====
First Round
4	(Japan) Y Watanabe (Japan) A Higashino	21	21
(Indonesia) A Maulana (Indonesia) M C Bandaso	11	16
(Indonesia) R Rivaldy (Indonesia) P H Mentari	15	21	21
(Japan) Y Kaneko (Japan) M Matsutomo	21	12	19
8	(Indonesia) H Faizal (Indonesia) G E Widjaja	17	14
(Malaysia) Tan K M (Malaysia) Lai P J	21	21
(England) C Hemming (England) J Pugh	13	19
(South Korea) Ko S-h (South Korea) Eom H-w	21	21

Second Round
4	(Japan) Y Watanabe (Japan) A Higashino	21	22
(Indonesia) R Rivaldy (Indonesia) P H Mentari	13	20
(Malaysia) Tan K M (Malaysia) Lai P J	18	21	21
(South Korea) Ko S-h (South Korea) Eom H-w	21	18	13

Quarter-finals
4	(Japan) Y Watanabe (Japan) A Higashino	19	21	21
(Malaysia) Tan K M (Malaysia) Lai P J	21	12	14

=== Bottom half ===
==== Section 3 ====
First Round
(India) S Rankireddy (India) A Ponnappa	17	21	11
(China) Feng YZ (China) Du Y	21	14	21
(Hong Kong) Chang T C (Hong Kong) Ng W Y	21	21
7	(Malaysia) Chan P S (Malaysia) Goh L Y	17	19
(China) He JT (China) Liu XX	1^{r}
(Malaysia) Goh S H (Malaysia) S J Lai	6
(Denmark) M Mikkelsen (Denmark) R Søby Hansen	15	14
3	(Indonesia) P Jordan (Indonesia) M D Oktavianti	21	21

Second Round
(China) Feng YZ (China) Du Y	21	21
(Hong Kong) Chang T C (Hong Kong) Ng W Y	15	16
(Malaysia) Goh S H (Malaysia) S J Lai	14	12
3	(Indonesia) P Jordan (Indonesia) M D Oktavianti	21	21

Quarter-finals
(China) Feng YZ (China) Du Y	16	21	17
3	(Indonesia) P Jordan (Indonesia) M D Oktavianti	21	18	21

==== Section 4 ====
First Round
(Chinese Taipei) Lee J-h (Chinese Taipei) Hsu Y-c	21	15	22
(Denmark) N Nøhr (Denmark) A Magelund	18	21	20
(Denmark) J Bay (Denmark) S Lundgaard	6	10
6	(England) M Ellis (England) L Smith	21	21
(Scotland) A Hall (Scotland) J MacPherson	18	17
(Russia) R Alimov (Russia) A Davletova	21	21
(Malaysia) Chen T J (Malaysia) Peck Y W	16	21
2	(Thailand) D Puavaranukroh (Thailand) S Taerattanachai	21	23

Second Round
(Chinese Taipei) Lee J-h (Chinese Taipei) Hsu Y-c	17	21	21
6	(England) M Ellis (England) L Smith	21	19	14
(Russia) R Alimov (Russia) A Davletova	18	19
2	(Thailand) D Puavaranukroh (Thailand) S Taerattanachai	21	21

Quarter-finals
(Chinese Taipei) Lee J-h (Chinese Taipei) Hsu Y-c	9	3^{r}
2	(Thailand) D Puavaranukroh (Thailand) S Taerattanachai	21	11

Preceded by 2021 Taipei Open (original); 2021 Spain Masters (eventual)	BWF World Tour; 2021 BWF season	Succeeded by 2021 French Open
