= 2021 French Open (badminton) =

2021 badminton tournament in Paris

Tournament details
- Dates: 26–31 October
- Level: Super 750
- Total prize money: US$600,000
- Venue: Stade Pierre de Coubertin
- Location: Paris, France

Champions
- Men's singles: (Japan) Kanta Tsuneyama
- Women's singles: (Japan) Akane Yamaguchi
- Men's doubles: (South Korea) Ko Sung-hyun (South Korea) Shin Baek-cheol
- Women's doubles: (South Korea) Lee So-hee (South Korea) Shin Seung-chan
- Mixed doubles: (Japan) Yuta Watanabe (Japan) Arisa Higashino

The 2021 French Open (officially known as the Yonex French Open 2021 for sponsorship reasons) was a badminton tournament which took place at the Stade Pierre de Coubertin in Paris, France, from 26 to 31 October 2021 and had a total prize of US$600,000.

== Tournament ==
The 2021 French Open was the sixth tournament according to the 2021 BWF World Tour as many tournaments got canceled due to the COVID-19 pandemic. It was a part of the French Open, which had been held since 1935. This tournament was organized by French Badminton Federation with sanction from the BWF.

=== Venue ===
This international tournament was held at Stade Pierre de Coubertin in Paris, France.

=== Point distribution ===
Below is the point distribution table for each phase of the tournament based on the BWF points system for the BWF World Tour Super 750 event.

Winner	Runner-up	3/4	5/8	9/16	17/32
11,000	9,350	7,700	6,050	4,320	2,660

=== Prize money ===
The total prize money for this tournament was US$600,000. The distribution of the prize money was in accordance with BWF regulations.

Event	Winner	Finalist	Semi-finals	Quarter-finals	Last 16	Last 32
Singles	$42,000	$20,400	$8,400	$3,300	$1,800	$600
Doubles	$44,400	$21,000	$8,400	$3,750	$1,800	$600

== Men's singles ==
=== Seeds ===
1. (Japan) Kento Momota (semi-finals)
2. (Denmark) Viktor Axelsen (first round)
3. (Denmark) Anders Antonsen (first round)
4. (Chinese Taipei) Chou Tien-chen (final)
5. (Indonesia) Anthony Sinisuka Ginting (withdrew)
6. (Indonesia) Jonatan Christie (withdrew)
7. (Malaysia) Lee Zii Jia (first round)
8. (Hong Kong) Ng Ka Long (second round)

=== Finals ===
Semi-finals
1	(Japan) Kento Momota	26	11	0^{r}
(Japan) Kanta Tsuneyama	24	21	1
4	(Chinese Taipei) Chou Tien-chen	21	21
(South Korea) Heo Kwang-hee	15	17

Final
(Japan) Kanta Tsuneyama	15	21	21
4	(Chinese Taipei) Chou Tien-chen	21	8	17

=== Top half ===
==== Section 1 ====
First Round
1	(Japan) K Momota	21	20	21
(India) S Kidambi	18	22	19
(France) T J Popov	14	10
(Denmark) R Gemke	21	21
PFR	(South Korea) Lee D-k	14	12
(India) Sa Verma	21	21
(Canada) B Yang	17	16
(Indonesia) S H Rhustavito	21	21

Second Round
1	(Japan) K Momota	21	21
(Denmark) R Gemke	19	18
(India) Sa Verma	21	12^{r}
(Indonesia) S H Rhustavito	16	21

Quarter-finals
1	(Japan) K Momota	21	21
(Indonesia) S H Rhustavito	19	11

==== Section 2 ====
First Round
3	(Denmark) A Antonsen	19	19
(Hong Kong) Lee C Y	21	21
(Thailand) K Wangcharoen	15	21	25
(France) T Rouxel	21	11	27
8	(Hong Kong) Ng K L	16
(Netherlands) M Caljouw	3^{r}
(Malaysia) Liew D	18	13
(Japan) K Tsuneyama	21	21

Second Round
(Hong Kong) Lee C Y	21	21
(France) T Rouxel	17	18
8	(Hong Kong) Ng K L	9	12
(Japan) K Tsuneyama	21	21

Quarter-finals
(Hong Kong) Lee C Y	16	9
(Japan) K Tsuneyama	21	21

=== Bottom half ===
==== Section 3 ====
First Round
(Japan) K Nishimoto	21	11	21
(Thailand) K Vitidsarn	16	21	16
(India) So Verma	22	21
PFR	(Brazil) Y Coelho	20	19
(India) Parupalli K	17	21	11
(France) B Leverdez	21	17	21
(India) Prannoy K	11	14
4	(Chinese Taipei) Chou T-c	21	21

Second Round
(Japan) K Nishimoto	21	21
(India) So Verma	12	9
(France) B Leverdez	16	21	19
4	(Chinese Taipei) Chou T-c	21	17	21

Quarter-finals
(Japan) K Nishimoto	17	21	16
4	(Chinese Taipei) Chou T-c	21	19	21

==== Section 4 ====
First Round
(India) L Sen	21	21
PFR	(Republic of Ireland) N Nguyen	10	16
(Singapore) Loh K Y	24	21
7	(Malaysia) Lee Z J	22	14
PFR	(Israel) M Zilberman	15	21	9
(Chinese Taipei) Wang T-w	21	19	21
(South Korea) Heo K-h	0
2	(Denmark) V Axelsen	1^{r}

Second Round
(India) L Sen	21	21
(Singapore) Loh K Y	17	13
(Chinese Taipei) Wang T-w	10	18
(South Korea) Heo K-h	21	21

Quarter-finals
(India) L Sen	17	15
(South Korea) Heo K-h	21	21

== Women's singles ==
=== Seeds ===
1. (Japan) Akane Yamaguchi (champion)
2. (Thailand) Ratchanok Intanon (quarter-finals)
3. (India) P. V. Sindhu (semi-finals)
4. (South Korea) An Se-young (semi-finals)
5. (Thailand) Pornpawee Chochuwong (quarter-finals)
6. (Canada) Michelle Li (withdrew)
7. (Denmark) Mia Blichfeldt (first round)
8. (Thailand) Busanan Ongbamrungphan (quarter-finals)

=== Finals ===
Semi-finals
1	(Japan) Akane Yamaguchi	21	10	21
4	(South Korea) An Se-young	13	21	18
3	(India) P. V. Sindhu	21	16	12
(Japan) Sayaka Takahashi	18	21	21

Final
1	(Japan) Akane Yamaguchi	21	21
(Japan) Sayaka Takahashi	18	12

=== Top half ===
==== Section 1 ====
First Round
1	(Japan) A Yamaguchi	21	21
(South Korea) Kim G-e	19	19
(Russia) E Kosetskaya	21	21
(Thailand) S Katethong	16	15
5	(Thailand) P Chochuwong	21	21
(Bulgaria) L Zetchiri	12	4
(Germany) Y Li	8	21	21
(Thailand) P Chaiwan	21	18	15

Second Round
1	(Japan) A Yamaguchi	21	22
(Russia) E Kosetskaya	17	20
5	(Thailand) P Chochuwong	21	21
(Germany) Y Li	10	5

Quarter-finals
1	(Japan) A Yamaguchi	21	19	21
5	(Thailand) P Chochuwong	19	21	16

==== Section 2 ====
First Round
4	(South Korea) An S-y	21	21
PFR	(France) L Huet	10	9
(Denmark) L Kjærsfeldt	20	22	21
PFR	(Spain) B Corrales	22	20	19
7	(Denmark) M Blichfeldt	13	12
(Indonesia) G M Tunjung	21	21
(Belgium) L Tan	16	9
(Singapore) Yeo J M	21	21

Second Round
4	(South Korea) An S-y	21	21
(Denmark) L Kjærsfeldt	9	7
(Indonesia) G M Tunjung	19	8
(Singapore) Yeo J M	21	21

Quarter-finals
4	(South Korea) An S-y	21	21
(Singapore) Yeo J M	11	17

=== Bottom half ===
==== Section 3 ====
First Round
(Scotland) K Gilmour	21	13	21
(United States) I Wang	14	21	14
(Estonia) K Kuuba	9	17
8	(Thailand) B Ongbamrungphan	21	21
(Denmark) L Christophersen	21	21
PFR	(Poland) J Hart	18	16
(Denmark) J D Jakobsen	15	18
3	(India) P. V. Sindhu	21	21

Second Round
(Scotland) K Gilmour	15	15
8	(Thailand) B Ongbamrungphan	21	21
(Denmark) L Christophersen	19	9
3	(India) P. V. Sindhu	21	21

Quarter-finals
8	(Thailand) B Ongbamrungphan	14	14
3	(India) P. V. Sindhu	21	21

==== Section 4 ====
First Round
(Japan) S Takahashi	21	9
(India) S Nehwal	11	2^{r}
(Japan) A Ohori	21	21
PFR	(France) Y Hoyaux	12	10
(Spain) C Azurmendi	21	18	17
(Chinese Taipei) Pai Y-p	18	21	21
(France) M Batomene	13	16
2	(Thailand) R Intanon	21	21

Second Round
(Japan) S Takahashi	21	21
(Japan) A Ohori	11	12
(Chinese Taipei) Pai Y-p	16	12
2	(Thailand) R Intanon	21	21

Quarter-finals
(Japan) S Takahashi	21	21
2	(Thailand) R Intanon	6	16

== Men's doubles ==
=== Seeds ===
1. (Indonesia) Marcus Fernaldi Gideon / Kevin Sanjaya Sukamuljo (final)
2. (Indonesia) Mohammad Ahsan / Hendra Setiawan (quarter-finals)
3. (Indonesia) Fajar Alfian / Muhammad Rian Ardianto (semi-finals)
4. (Malaysia) Aaron Chia / Soh Wooi Yik (semi-finals)
5. (India) Satwiksairaj Rankireddy / Chirag Shetty (quarter-finals)
6. (Denmark) Kim Astrup / Anders Skaarup Rasmussen (withdrew)
7. (Malaysia) Ong Yew Sin / Teo Ee Yi (quarter-finals)
8. (Japan) Takuro Hoki / Yugo Kobayashi (quarter-finals)

=== Finals ===
Semi-finals
1	(Indonesia) Marcus Fernaldi Gideon (Indonesia) Kevin Sanjaya Sukamuljo	21	12	26
3	(Indonesia) Fajar Alfian (Indonesia) Muhammad Rian Ardianto	19	21	24
4	(Malaysia) Aaron Chia (Malaysia) Soh Wooi Yik	21	10	22
(South Korea) Ko Sung-hyun (South Korea) Shin Baek-cheol	14	21	24

Final
1	(Indonesia) Marcus Fernaldi Gideon (Indonesia) Kevin Sanjaya Sukamuljo	17	20
(South Korea) Ko Sung-hyun (South Korea) Shin Baek-cheol	21	22

=== Top half ===
==== Section 1 ====
First Round
1	(Indonesia) M F Gideon (Indonesia) K S Sukamuljo	w	/	o
(Denmark) J Eipe (Denmark) R Kjær
(Germany) M Lamsfuß (Germany) M Seidel	21	21
(Malaysia) Tan K M (Malaysia) Tan W K	18	15
7	(Malaysia) Ong Y S (Malaysia) Teo E Y	22	22	21
(Malaysia) Goh S F (Malaysia) N Izzuddin	24	20	17
(Netherlands) R Jille (Netherlands) T van der Lecq	13	22
(England) C Hemming (England) S Stallwood	21	24

Second Round
1	(Indonesia) M F Gideon (Indonesia) K S Sukamuljo	21	21
(Germany) M Lamsfuß (Germany) M Seidel	19	16
7	(Malaysia) Ong Y S (Malaysia) Teo E Y	21	21
(England) C Hemming (England) S Stallwood	8	8

Quarter-finals
1	(Indonesia) M F Gideon (Indonesia) K S Sukamuljo	21	22
7	(Malaysia) Ong Y S (Malaysia) Teo E Y	13	20

==== Section 2 ====
First Round
3	(Indonesia) F Alfian (Indonesia) M R Ardianto	21	21
(Scotland) A Dunn (Scotland) A Hall	14	14
(France) C Popov (France) T J Popov	17	23	21
(Denmark) D Lundgaard (Denmark) M Thyrri	21	21	10
8	(Japan) T Hoki (Japan) Y Kobayashi	21	21
(France) F Delrue (France) W Villeger	9	19
(Denmark) J Bay (Denmark) L Mølhede
(England) B Lane (England) S Vendy	w	/	o

Second Round
3	(Indonesia) F Alfian (Indonesia) M R Ardianto	21	21
(France) C Popov (France) T J Popov	12	15
8	(Japan) T Hoki (Japan) Y Kobayashi	21	21
(England) B Lane (England) S Vendy	12	17

Quarter-finals
3	(Indonesia) F Alfian (Indonesia) M R Ardianto	23	21
8	(Japan) T Hoki (Japan) Y Kobayashi	21	18

=== Bottom half ===
==== Section 3 ====
First Round
(India) Arjun M.R. (India) D Kapila	21	21
(Republic of Ireland) J Magee (Republic of Ireland) P Reynolds	13	7
(Chinese Taipei) Lee J-h (Chinese Taipei) Yang P-hs	21	17	13
5	(India) S Rankireddy (India) C Shetty	18	21	21
(Thailand) S Jomkoh (Thailand) K Kedren	20	21	21
(France) L Corvée (France) R Labar	22	14	16
(Malaysia) Goh V S (Malaysia) Low J S	23	12
4	(Malaysia) A Chia (Malaysia) Soh W Y	25	21

Second Round
(India) Arjun M.R. (India) D Kapila	21	10	19
5	(India) S Rankireddy (India) C Shetty	15	21	21
(Thailand) S Jomkoh (Thailand) K Kedren	12	12
4	(Malaysia) A Chia (Malaysia) Soh W Y	21	21

Quarter-finals
5	(India) S Rankireddy (India) C Shetty	21	18	17
4	(Malaysia) A Chia (Malaysia) Soh W Y	18	21	21

==== Section 4 ====
First Round
(South Korea) Ko S-h (South Korea) Shin B-c	21	21
(India) M Attri (India) B. S Reddy	14	16
(Japan) A Koga (Japan) T Saito	w	/	o
6	(Denmark) K Astrup (Denmark) A S Rasmussen
(Indonesia) L R Carnando (Indonesia) D Marthin	22	17
(Chinese Taipei) Lu C-y (Chinese Taipei) Yang P-ha	24	21
(Japan) K Matsui (Japan) Y Takeuchi	19	21
2	(Indonesia) M Ahsan (Indonesia) H Setiawan	21	23

Second Round
(South Korea) Ko S-h (South Korea) Shin B-c	21	21
(Japan) A Koga (Japan) T Saito	15	14
(Chinese Taipei) Lu C-y (Chinese Taipei) Yang P-ha	16	21	15
2	(Indonesia) M Ahsan (Indonesia) H Setiawan	21	14	21

Quarter-finals
(South Korea) Ko S-h (South Korea) Shin B-c	16	21	21
2	(Indonesia) M Ahsan (Indonesia) H Setiawan	21	19	13

== Women's doubles ==
=== Seeds ===
1. (South Korea) Lee So-hee / Shin Seung-chan (champions)
2. (South Korea) Kim So-yeong / Kong Hee-yong (final)
3. (Thailand) Jongkolphan Kititharakul / Rawinda Prajongjai (quarter-finals)
4. (Japan) Nami Matsuyama / Chiharu Shida (semi-finals)
5. (Bulgaria) Gabriela Stoeva / Stefani Stoeva (quarter-finals)
6. (England) Chloe Birch / Lauren Smith (quarter-finals)
7. (Denmark) Maiken Fruergaard / Sara Thygesen (second round)
8. (Malaysia) Pearly Tan / Thinaah Muralitharan (second round)

=== Finals ===
Semi-finals
1	(South Korea) Lee So-hee (South Korea) Shin Seung-chan	21	21
(Japan) Yuki Fukushima (Japan) Arisa Higashino	18	19
4	(Japan) Nami Matsuyama (Japan) Chiharu Shida	17	19
2	(South Korea) Kim So-yeong (South Korea) Kong Hee-yong	21	21

Final
1	(South Korea) Lee So-hee (South Korea) Shin Seung-chan	21	21
2	(South Korea) Kim So-yeong (South Korea) Kong Hee-yong	17	12

=== Top half ===
==== Section 1 ====
First Round
1	(South Korea) Lee S-h (South Korea) Shin S-c	21	21
(India) A Ponnappa (India) N. S Reddy	16	17
(Indonesia) N V Marwah (Indonesia) P Syaikah	21	21
(Denmark) A Magelund (Denmark) F Ravn	16	16
5	(Bulgaria) G Stoeva (Bulgaria) S Stoeva	21	20	21
(Chinese Taipei) Hsu Y-c (Chinese Taipei) Hu L-f	18	22	8
(Malaysia) V Hoo K M (Malaysia) Lim C S	12	14
(Denmark) A Bøje (Denmark) M Poulsen	21	21

Second Round
1	(South Korea) Lee S-h (South Korea) Shin S-c	21	13	21
(Indonesia) N V Marwah (Indonesia) P Syaikah	18	21	14
5	(Bulgaria) G Stoeva (Bulgaria) S Stoeva	25	23
(Denmark) A Bøje (Denmark) M Poulsen	23	21

Quarter-finals
1	(South Korea) Lee S-h (South Korea) Shin S-c	21	21
5	(Bulgaria) G Stoeva (Bulgaria) S Stoeva	13	9

==== Section 2 ====
First Round
3	(Thailand) J Kititharakul (Thailand) R Prajongjai	21	21
(Denmark) J Finne-Ipsen (Denmark) M Surrow	16	12
(Canada) R Honderich (Canada) K Tsai	21	21
(Estonia) K-K Marran (Estonia) H Rüütel	17	12
7	(Denmark) M Fruergaard (Denmark) S Thygesen	21	21
(Spain) C Azurmendi (Spain) B Corrales	17	19
(Japan) Y Fukushima (Japan) A Higashino	21	21
(Thailand) B Aimsaard (Thailand) N Aimsaard	18	11

Second Round
3	(Thailand) J Kititharakul (Thailand) R Prajongjai	21	21
(Canada) R Honderich (Canada) K Tsai	13	17
7	(Denmark) M Fruergaard (Denmark) S Thygesen	12	7
(Japan) Y Fukushima (Japan) A Higashino	21	21

Quarter-finals
3	(Thailand) J Kititharakul (Thailand) R Prajongjai	16	19
(Japan) Y Fukushima (Japan) A Higashino	21	21

=== Bottom half ===
==== Section 3 ====
First Round
(Malaysia) Lee M Y (Malaysia) Yap C W	21	21
PFR	(Ukraine) M Stoliarenko (Ukraine) Y Zharka	12	17
(France) M Lambert (France) A Tran	16	12
6	(England) C Birch (England) L Smith	21	21
(Sweden) J Magnusson (Sweden) C Nistad	19	22	21
(Chinese Taipei) Chang C-h (Chinese Taipei) Lee C-c	21	20	19
(Germany) L Efler (Germany) I Lohau	15	12
4	(Japan) N Matsuyama (Japan) C Shida	21	21

Second Round
(Malaysia) Lee M Y (Malaysia) Yap C W	19	24	16
6	(England) C Birch (England) L Smith	21	22	21
(Sweden) J Magnusson (Sweden) C Nistad	16	16
4	(Japan) N Matsuyama (Japan) C Shida	21	21

Quarter-finals
6	(England) C Birch (England) L Smith	14	21	10
4	(Japan) N Matsuyama (Japan) C Shida	21	18	21

==== Section 4 ====
First Round
(Republic of Ireland) K Frost (Republic of Ireland) M Ryan	11	13
(Indonesia) S F S Ramadhanti (Indonesia) R Sugiarto	21	21
(England) J Hopton (England) J Pugh	21	10
8	(Malaysia) P Tan (Malaysia) Thinaah M	23	21
(India) M Jakkampudi (India) P S. Ram	4^{r}
(Netherlands) A Tirtosentono (Netherlands) I van der Aar	11
(Thailand) P Supajirakul (Thailand) S Taerattanachai	18	21	10
2	(South Korea) Kim S-y (South Korea) Kong H-y	21	12	21

Second Round
(Indonesia) S F S Ramadhanti (Indonesia) R Sugiarto	21	23
8	(Malaysia) P Tan (Malaysia) Thinaah M	12	21
(Netherlands) A Tirtosentono (Netherlands) I van der Aar	16	6
2	(South Korea) Kim S-y (South Korea) Kong H-y	21	21

Quarter-finals
(Indonesia) S F S Ramadhanti (Indonesia) R Sugiarto	19	14
2	(South Korea) Kim S-y (South Korea) Kong H-y	21	21

== Mixed doubles ==
=== Seeds ===
1. (Thailand) Dechapol Puavaranukroh / Sapsiree Taerattanachai (semi-finals)
2. (Indonesia) Praveen Jordan / Melati Daeva Oktavianti (quarter-finals)
3. (Japan) Yuta Watanabe / Arisa Higashino (champions)
4. (England) Marcus Ellis / Lauren Smith (second round)
5. (Malaysia) Chan Peng Soon / Goh Liu Ying (quarter-finals)
6. (France) Thom Gicquel / Delphine Delrue (withdrew)
7. (Hong Kong) Tang Chun Man / Tse Ying Suet (semi-finals)
8. (Malaysia) Tan Kian Meng / Lai Pei Jing (second round)

=== Finals ===
Semi-finals
1	(Thailand) Dechapol Puavaranukroh (Thailand) Sapsiree Taerattanachai	18	20
3	(Japan) Yuta Watanabe (Japan) Arisa Higashino	21	22
(Denmark) Mathias Christiansen (Denmark) Alexandra Bøje	21	21
7	(Hong Kong) Tang Chun Man (Hong Kong) Tse Ying Suet	11	15

Final
3	(Japan) Yuta Watanabe (Japan) Arisa Higashino	21	21
(Denmark) Mathias Christiansen (Denmark) Alexandra Bøje	8	17

=== Top half ===
==== Section 1 ====
First Round
1	(Thailand) D Puavaranukroh (Thailand) S Taerattanachai	21	21
PFR	(Germany) J R Jansen (Germany) L Efler	18	12
(Russia) E Dremin (Russia) E Dimova	15	7
(Netherlands) R Tabeling (Netherlands) S Piek	21	21
PFR	(New Zealand) O Leydon-Davis (New Zealand) A Pak	9	12
(Malaysia) Goh S H (Malaysia) S J Lai	21	21
(South Korea) Ko S-h (South Korea) Eom H-w	17	11
(Russia) R Alimov (Russia) A Davletova	21	21

Second Round
1	(Thailand) D Puavaranukroh (Thailand) S Taerattanachai	21	21
(Netherlands) R Tabeling (Netherlands) S Piek	15	17
(Malaysia) Goh S H (Malaysia) S J Lai	21	21
(Russia) R Alimov (Russia) A Davletova	9	13

Quarter-finals
1	(Thailand) D Puavaranukroh (Thailand) S Taerattanachai	21	21
(Malaysia) Goh S H (Malaysia) S J Lai	14	10

==== Section 2 ====
First Round
3	(Japan) Y Watanabe (Japan) A Higashino	21	21
(Indonesia) R Rivaldy (Indonesia) P H Mentari	12	16
(Malaysia) Hoo P R (Malaysia) Cheah Y S	21	21
(Chinese Taipei) Yang P-hs (Chinese Taipei) Hu L-f	14	14
5	(Malaysia) Chan P S (Malaysia) Goh L Y	21	21
(India) D Kapila (India) N. S Reddy	19	19
(Japan) Y Kaneko (Japan) M Matsutomo	15	21	21
(Hong Kong) Chang T C (Hong Kong) Ng W Y	21	17	18

Second Round
3	(Japan) Y Watanabe (Japan) A Higashino	21	21
(Malaysia) Hoo P R (Malaysia) Cheah Y S	16	18
5	(Malaysia) Chan P S (Malaysia) Goh L Y	21	21
(Japan) Y Kaneko (Japan) M Matsutomo	19	14

Quarter-finals
3	(Japan) Y Watanabe (Japan) A Higashino	21	21
5	(Malaysia) Chan P S (Malaysia) Goh L Y	10	17

=== Bottom half ===
==== Section 3 ====
First Round
(England) C Hemming (England) J Pugh	12	21
(Thailand) S Jomkoh (Thailand) S Paewsampran	21	23
(Denmark) J Bay (Denmark) S Lundgaard	18	15
8	(Malaysia) Tan K M (Malaysia) Lai P J	21	21
(France) R Labar (Australia) G Somerville	14	21	20
(Denmark) M Christiansen (Denmark) A Bøje	21	16	22
(Germany) M Lamsfuß (Germany) I Lohau	18	18
4	(England) M Ellis (England) L Smith	21	21

Second Round
(Thailand) S Jomkoh (Thailand) S Paewsampran	20	23	21
8	(Malaysia) Tan K M (Malaysia) Lai P J	22	21	14
(Denmark) M Christiansen (Denmark) A Bøje	11	21	21
4	(England) M Ellis (England) L Smith	21	14	17

Quarter-finals
(Thailand) S Jomkoh (Thailand) S Paewsampran	16	10
(Denmark) M Christiansen (Denmark) A Bøje	21	21

==== Section 4 ====
First Round
(Chinese Taipei) Lee J-h (Chinese Taipei) Hsu Y-c	25	26	13
(Denmark) N Nøhr (Denmark) A Magelund	27	24	21
(Denmark) M Mikkelsen (Denmark) R Søby Hansen	17	21	13
7	(Hong Kong) Tang C M (Hong Kong) Tse Y S	21	19	21
(Denmark) M Thyrri (Denmark) M Surrow	19	15
(India) S Rankireddy (India) A Ponnappa	21	21
(Malaysia) Chen T J (Malaysia) Peck Y W	20	19
2	(Indonesia) P Jordan (Indonesia) M D Oktavianti	22	21

Second Round
(Denmark) N Nøhr (Denmark) A Magelund	11	13
7	(Hong Kong) Tang C M (Hong Kong) Tse Y S	21	21
(India) S Rankireddy (India) A Ponnappa	21	17	19
2	(Indonesia) P Jordan (Indonesia) M D Oktavianti	15	21	21

Quarter-finals
7	(Hong Kong) Tang C M (Hong Kong) Tse Y S	21	21
2	(Indonesia) P Jordan (Indonesia) M D Oktavianti	19	11

Preceded by 2021 Denmark Open	BWF World Tour; 2021 BWF season	Succeeded by 2021 Hylo Open
