= 2014 Asian Junior Badminton Championships – Boys singles =

Tournament details
- Dates: 19 – 23 February 2014
- Edition: 17
- Venue: Taipei Gymnasium
- Location: Taipei, Taiwan

The boys' singles tournament of the 2014 Asian Junior Badminton Championships was held from February 19–23 in Taipei, Taiwan. The defending champions of the last edition was Soo Teck Zhi from Malaysia. Aditya Joshi, Jonatan Christie and Zhao Junpeng were the top 3 seeded this year. Shi Yuqi of China emerged as the champion after beat Kanta Tsuneyama of Japan in the finals with the score 19–21, 21–16, 21–16.

== Seeded ==
1. (India) Aditya Joshi (second round)
2. (Indonesia) Jonatan Christie (quarter-final)
3. (China) Zhao Junpeng (semi-final)
4. (Malaysia) Cheam June Wei (second round)
5. (China) Shi Yuqi (champion)
6. (Vietnam) Pham Cao Cuong (quarter-final)
7. (Singapore) Ryan Ng Zin Rei (second round)
8. (Indonesia) Anthony Sinisuka Ginting (quarter-final)

== Draw ==
=== Finals ===
Quarterfinals
(Japan) Kanta Tsuneyama | 21 | 21
8 | (Indonesia) Anthony Sinisuka Ginting | 13 | 15
3 | (China) Zhao Junpeng | 21 | 21
6 | (Vietnam) Pham Cao Cuong | 12 | 11
5 | (China) Shi Yuqi | 21 | 21
(South Korea) Seo Seung-jae | 13 | 16
(Hong Kong) Lee Cheuk Yiu | 10 | 21 | 21
2 | (Indonesia) Jonatan Christie | 21 | 19 | 16

Semifinals
(Japan) Kanta Tsuneyama | 21 | 21
3 | (China) Zhao Junpeng | 9 | 18
5 | (China) Shi Yuqi | 21 | 21
(Hong Kong) Lee Cheuk Yiu | 8 | 13

Final
(Japan) Kanta Tsuneyama | 21 | 16 | 16
5 | (China) Shi Yuqi | 19 | 21 | 21

=== Top Half ===
==== Section 1 ====
First Round
1 | (India) A Joshi
BYE
(Japan) K Tsuneyama | 21 | 21
(Singapore) B Ong | 14 | 18
(Uzbekistan) A Khadjaev | 10 | 10
(Syria) M Aram | 21 | 21
(Sri Lanka) A Wanniachchigedon | 5 | 12
(Japan) K Kirita | 21 | 21

Second Round
1 | (India) A Joshi | 21 | 21 | 12
(Japan) K Tsuneyama | 17 | 23 | 21
(Syria) M Aram | 11 | 18
(Japan) K Kirita | 21 | 21

Third Round
(Japan) K Tsuneyama | 21 | 21
(Japan) K Kirita | 14 | 17

==== Section 2 ====
First Round
8 | (Indonesia) A Ginting
BYE
(Sri Lanka) P Ranaweera | 8 | 18
(Hong Kong) Lee CW | 21 | 21
(Macau) J Lo | 15 | 17
(India) A Naqvi | 21 | 21
(South Korea) Kim H-t | 21 | 21
(Hong Kong) Leung KY | 11 | 16

Second Round
8 | (Indonesia) A Ginting | 21 | 21
(Hong Kong) Lee CW | 9 | 12
(India) A Naqvi | 17 | 10
(South Korea) Kim H-t | 21 | 21

Third Round
8 | (Indonesia) A Ginting | 21 | 21
(South Korea) Kim H-t | 14 | 19

==== Section 3 ====
First Round
3 | (China) Zhao JP
BYE
(Chinese Taipei) Lu C-h | 21 | 21
(Sri Lanka) M Samaranayake | 7 | 7
(South Korea) Lee J-s | 16 | 12
(Chinese Taipei) Chen C-c | 21 | 21
(Malaysia) S Ramachandran | 15 | 16
(Chinese Taipei) Lai Y-h | 21 | 21

Second Round
3 | (China) Zhao JP | 15 | 21 | 21
(Chinese Taipei) Lu C-h | 21 | 15 | 19
(Chinese Taipei) Chen C-c | 12 | 13
(Chinese Taipei) Lai Y-h | 21 | 21

Third Round
3 | (China) Zhao JP | 21 | 21
(Chinese Taipei) Lai Y-h | 13 | 18

==== Section 4 ====
First Round
6 | (Vietnam) Pham CC | 21 | 21
(Philippines) R Pedrosa | 14 | 10
(Thailand) K Wangcharoen | 21 | 21
(Singapore) D Ng | 9 | 10
(Malaysia) Tan TH | 21 | 21
(Philippines) A Giverjuan | 11 | 12
(Chinese Taipei) Liou W-c | 21 | 21
(Macau) Tai KH | 10 | 6

Second Round
6 | (Vietnam) Pham CC | 21 | 21
(Thailand) K Wangcharoen | 19 | 17
(Malaysia) Tan TH | 21 | 19 | 21
(Chinese Taipei) Liou W-c | 15 | 21 | 15

Third Round
6 | (Vietnam) Pham CC | 15 | 21 | 21
(Malaysia) Tan TH | 21 | 16 | 13

=== Bottom Half ===
==== Section 5 ====
First Round
(Chinese Taipei) Lo C-y | 16 | 19
(China) Lin GP | 21 | 21
(Malaysia) Lee ZJ | 21 | 21
(India) T Laa | 14 | 19
(South Korea) Kang H-s | 23 | 15 | 20
(Japan) M Koga | 21 | 21 | 22
(Uzbekistan) A Bakshulaev | 5 | 6
5 | (China) Shi YQ | 21 | 21

Second Round
(China) Lin GP | 21 | 22
(Malaysia) Lee ZJ | 12 | 20
(Japan) M Koga | 12 | 20
5 | (China) Shi YQ | 21 | 22

Third Round
(China) Lin GP | 20 | 16
5 | (China) Shi YQ | 22 | 21

==== Section 6 ====
First Round
(Japan) K Tamate | 21 | 21
(Syria) A Al Jallad | 17 | 14
(Sri Lanka) B Yatawara | 9 | 11
(China) Sun FX | 21 | 21
(Vietnam) Do TD | 11 | 14
(South Korea) Seo S-j | 21 | 21
BYE
4 | (Malaysia) Cheam JW

Second Round
(Japan) K Tamate | 18 | 19
(China) Sun FX | 21 | 21
(South Korea) Seo S-j | 21 | 21
4 | (Malaysia) Cheam JW | 15 | 14

Third Round
(China) Sun FX | 21 | 15 | 18
(South Korea) Seo S-j | 7 | 21 | 21

==== Section 7 ====
First Round
(Kazakhstan) K Kulmatov | 11 | 10
(Hong Kong) Lee CY | 21 | 21
(India) K Dharmamer | 10 | 23
(Thailand) M Narongrit | 21 | 25
(Thailand) K Leelavechabutr | 19 | 13
(Indonesia) E Jaya | 21 | 21
(Macau) Iek UI | 13 | 16
7 | (Singapore) R Ng | 21 | 21

Second Round
(Hong Kong) Lee CY | 21 | 21
(Thailand) M Narongrit | 14 | 15
(Indonesia) E Jaya | 21 | 25
7 | (Singapore) R Ng | 16 | 23

Third Round
(Hong Kong) Lee CY | 17 | 21 | 21
(Indonesia) E Jaya | 21 | 17 | 16

==== Section 8 ====
First Round
(Macau) Lou HM | 15 | 21 | 8
(Philippines) F Gabuelo | 21 | 18 | 21
(Philippines) W Lopez | 8 | 11
(Indonesia) B Pangisthu | 21 | 21
(Thailand) A Saetiaw | 18 | 21
(Chinese Taipei) Chang E-c | 21 | 23
BYE
2 | (Indonesia) J Christie

Second Round
(Philippines) F Gabuelo | 8 | 11
(Indonesia) B Pangisthu | 21 | 21
(Chinese Taipei) Chang E-c | 22 | 19 | 12
2 | (Indonesia) J Christie | 20 | 21 | 21

Third Round
(Indonesia) B Pangisthu | 14 | 20
2 | (Indonesia) J Christie | 21 | 22
