= Kanta Tsuneyama =

Japanese badminton player

Personal information
- Born: 21 June 1996 (age 30) Kusatsu, Shiga Prefecture, Japan
- Height: 1.73 m (5 ft 8 in)
- Weight: 60 kg (132 lb)

Sport
- Country: Japan
- Sport: Badminton
- Handedness: Right
- Retired: 22 August 2024

Men's singles
- Career record: 195 wins, 130 losses (60.00%)
- Highest ranking: 10 (26 November 2019)
- BWF profile
Medal record
Men's badminton
Representing Japan
Sudirman Cup
Bronze medal – third place	2023 Suzhou	Mixed team
Thomas Cup
Silver medal – second place	2018 Bangkok	Men's team
Bronze medal – third place	2020 Aarhus	Men's team
Bronze medal – third place	2022 Bangkok	Men's team
Asian Games
Bronze medal – third place	2018 Jakarta–Palembang	Men's team
Bronze medal – third place	2022 Hangzhou	Men's team
Asian Championships
Bronze medal – third place	2023 Dubai	Men's singles
Asia Mixed Team Championships
Silver medal – second place	2019 Hong Kong	Mixed team
Asia Team Championships
Bronze medal – third place	2020 Manila	Men's team
World Junior Championships
Bronze medal – third place	2014 Alor Setar	Mixed team
Asian Junior Championships
Silver medal – second place	2014 Taipei	Boys' singles
Bronze medal – third place	2014 Taipei	Boys' doubles
Bronze medal – third place	2014 Taipei	Mixed team
Representing (International Olympic Committee) Mixed-NOCs
Youth Olympic Games
Silver medal – second place	2014 Nanjing	Mixed doubles

Kanta Tsuneyama (常山 幹太, Tsuneyama Kanta; born 21 June 1996) is a Japanese former professional badminton player and current coach. A men's singles player from Kusatsu, Shiga Prefecture, he achieved a career-high world ranking of No. 10. During his career, Tsuneyama won several BWF World Tour titles, including the 2018 Thailand Open, the 2019 Korea Masters, and the 2021 French Open. He also earned medals with the Japanese national team, securing a silver at the 2018 Thomas Cup and bronze medals at the 2018 and 2022 Asian Games. After retiring from professional competition in August 2024, Tsuneyama was appointed coach of the Hokuto Bank women's badminton team, beginning with the 2025 season.

== Early career ==
Tsuneyama began playing badminton at the age of six, influenced by his parents, who were former corporate badminton players in Japan. He attended Kusatsu Elementary School and Kusatsu Junior High School. In 2011, while in junior high, he was a semi-finalist at the All Japan Junior High School Championships.

He later attended Higashi Osaka University Kashiwara High School, known for its badminton program. While in high school, Tsuneyama secured several national titles: singles at the 2013 Inter-High School Championships and the 2014 National High School Invitational Badminton Championships; doubles at the 2014 Inter-High School Championships; and both singles and doubles at the 2013 All Japan Junior Badminton Championships.

On the international junior circuit, at the 2014 Asian Junior Championships in Taipei, he won medals in three events: a silver medal in the boys' singles (defeating Anthony Sinisuka Ginting in the quarterfinals before losing to Shi Yuqi in the final), a bronze medal in the boys' doubles (partnering Hashiru Shimono), and a bronze medal as part of the Japanese mixed team. In the same year, he competed in the 2014 Summer Youth Olympics in Nanjing, China. He won a silver medal in mixed doubles partnering Lee Chia-hsin of Chinese Taipei (competing under the Mixed-NOCs banner) and reached the quarterfinals in the boys' singles, losing to Ginting. He also helped Japan win a bronze medal in the mixed team event at the World Junior Championships in Alor Setar, Malaysia.

While still a high school student, Tsuneyama competed against senior players at the All Japan Badminton Championships, reaching the quarterfinals in 2013 and the semifinals in 2014. After graduating from high school in 2015, he joined the Tonami Transportation badminton team, citing his ambition to compete in the Olympics as his motivation.

== Career ==
=== 2016: First international title ===
In 2016, Tsuneyama won his first senior international title at the Finnish Open in April, defeating Nguyễn Tiến Minh of Vietnam in the final. He also reached the finals of the Austrian Open in February and the Spanish International in June, where he was runner-up to Anders Antonsen of Denmark on both occasions. Additionally, Tsuneyama advanced to his first BWF Grand Prix Gold final at the U.S. Open in July, where he lost to Lee Hyun-il of South Korea. Starting the season with a world ranking of No. 140, Tsuneyama entered the top 50 and reached a career-high of world No. 45 by 28 August 2016.

=== 2017: First Grand Prix Gold title ===
In 2017, Tsuneyama won two international titles, beginning with the Austrian Open in February. He followed this by winning his first Grand Prix Gold title at the Canada Open in July, defeating his compatriot, Kento Momota, in the final. Momota was competing in his first international tournament following a suspension. By the end of the year, Tsuneyama had broken into the top 30, reaching a new career-high ranking of world No. 27.

=== 2018: First World Tour title, Thomas Cup silver ===
In 2018, Tsuneyama won his first BWF World Tour title at the Thailand Open, defeating Tommy Sugiarto in the final. He was the first Japanese men's singles player to win the title in the tournament's 34-year history. At the World Championships in Nanjing, Tsuneyama reached the quarterfinals for the first time. He defeated the 12th seed, Anthony Sinisuka Ginting, before being eliminated by Liew Daren of Malaysia.

In team competitions, Tsuneyama contributed to the Japanese team's silver medal at the Thomas Cup in Bangkok. During the semifinal against defending champion Denmark, with the tie at 2–2, he won the decisive fifth match against Jan Ø. Jørgensen to secure a 3–2 victory and advance the team to the final. At the Asian Games, Tsuneyama helped Japan win the bronze medal in the men's team event, the country's first medal in the event in 48 years.

=== 2019: Korea Masters win, top 10 ranking ===
Tsuneyama won his second World Tour title at the Korea Masters. Entering the tournament unseeded, his path to the final included a victory over sixth seed Srikanth Kidambi, before he defeated two-time Olympic champion Lin Dan 24–22, 21–12 in the final. Earlier that year at the Japan Open, he upset reigning Olympic champion Chen Long 21–14, 21–17 in the first round. He reached a career-high world ranking of No. 10 as of 26 November 2019.

In team competition, Tsuneyama was part of the Japanese squad that finished as runner-up at the Asian Mixed Team Championships. Individually, he reached the third round at the World Championships in Basel, where he was defeated by Denmark's Anders Antonsen, the eventual runner-up. Tsuneyama concluded the year by reaching the semifinals of the All Japan Badminton Championships, where he lost to Kenta Nishimoto, securing a bronze medal for the third consecutive year.

=== 2020–2021: Olympic debut, French Open title ===
In early 2020, Tsuneyama was a member of the Japanese team that won the bronze medal at the 2020 Badminton Asia Team Championships in Manila. Later that year, he finished as the runner-up at the All Japan Badminton Championships, losing to Kento Momota in the final.

Tsuneyama made his Olympic debut at the 2020 Summer Olympics in Tokyo, held in 2021. In the men's singles event, he advanced from his group stage by defeating Julien Paul of Mauritius and Ygor Coelho of Brazil. He was subsequently eliminated in the round of 16 by Indonesia's Anthony Sinisuka Ginting.

In team competitions later in 2021, Tsuneyama contributed to Japan winning a silver medal at the 2021 Sudirman Cup in Vantaa and a bronze medal at the 2020 Thomas Cup in Aarhus. In October, Tsuneyama won his first Super 750 title at the 2021 French Open, defeating Chou Tien-chen of Chinese Taipei in the final. He became the first Japanese player to win the tournament's men's singles title. He advanced to the final after his compatriot, Kento Momota, retired from their semifinal match due to injury.

=== 2022: Thomas Cup bronze ===
In 2022, Tsuneyama began the season by reaching the quarterfinals of the Asian Championships, where he lost to Lee Zii Jia. In May, he earned a bronze medal with the Japanese men's team at the Thomas Cup in Bangkok. Later that year, he advanced to the quarterfinals at the Malaysia Masters in July, defeating compatriot Kento Momota before falling to Prannoy H. S. He also reached the quarterfinals at the Japan Open, where he beat Srikanth Kidambi before losing to Anders Antonsen. However, his participation in the World Championships ended in the opening round.

=== 2023: Asian Championships bronze ===
Tsuneyama began the 2023 season in January by reaching the semifinals of the Super 1000 Malaysia Open. His run included a quarterfinal victory over Anthony Sinisuka Ginting before he was defeated by world No. 1 Viktor Axelsen. In March, he finished as the runner-up at the Spain Masters, losing to compatriot Kenta Nishimoto in the final. The following month, he secured a bronze medal at the Asian Championships after losing his semifinal match to the eventual champion, Anthony Sinisuka Ginting. At the World Championships in August, his campaign concluded in the third round with a defeat by Nishimoto. Later in the season, Tsuneyama reached the semifinals of the Arctic Open in October. In November, he also advanced to the semifinals of the China Masters, where he was defeated by the eventual champion, Kodai Naraoka. In team competitions, he contributed to Japan's bronze medal wins at both the Sudirman Cup and the Asian Games.

=== 2024: Final season and retirement ===
In 2024, Tsuneyama concluded his professional career. He participated in nine tournaments, with his best result being a second-round finish at the Japan Open in August. Following this tournament, on 22 August 2024, he announced his retirement from international badminton and withdrew from the Japanese national team.

== Achievements ==
=== Asian Championships ===
Men's singles
Year	Venue	Opponent	Score	Result	Ref.
2023	Sheikh Rashid Bin Hamdan Indoor Hall, Dubai, United Arab Emirates	(Indonesia) Anthony Sinisuka Ginting	13–21, 16–21	Bronze	

=== Youth Olympic Games ===
Mixed doubles
Year	Venue	Partner	Opponent	Score	Result	Ref.
2014	Nanjing Sport Institute; Nanjing, China	(Chinese Taipei) Lee Chia-hsin	(Malaysia) Cheam June Wei (Hong Kong) Ng Tsz Yau	14–21, 21–23	Silver	

=== Asia Junior Championships ===
Boys' singles
Year	Venue	Opponent	Score	Result	Ref.
2014	Taipei Gymnasium, Taipei, Taiwan	(China) Shi Yuqi	21–19, 16–21, 16–21	Silver	

Boys' doubles
Year	Venue	Partner	Opponent	Score	Result	Ref.
2014	Taipei Gymnasium; Taipei, Taiwan	(Japan) Hashiru Shimono	(South Korea) Kim Jae-hwan (South Korea) Kim Jung-ho	16–21, 17–21	Bronze	

=== BWF World Tour (3 titles, 1 runner-up) ===
The BWF World Tour, which was announced on 19 March 2017 and implemented in 2018, is a series of elite badminton tournaments sanctioned by the Badminton World Federation (BWF). The BWF World Tour is divided into levels of World Tour Finals, Super 1000, Super 750, Super 500, Super 300 (part of the HSBC World Tour), and the BWF Tour Super 100.

Men's singles
Year	Tournament	Level	Opponent	Score	Result	Ref.
2018	Thailand Open	Super 500	(Indonesia) Tommy Sugiarto	21–16, 13–21, 21–9	(gold) Winner	
2019	Korea Masters	Super 300	(China) Lin Dan	24–22, 21–12	(gold) Winner	
2021	French Open	Super 750	(Chinese Taipei) Chou Tien-chen	15–21, 21–8, 21–17	(gold) Winner	
2023	Spain Masters	Super 300	(Japan) Kenta Nishimoto	21–15, 18–21, 19–21	(silver) Runner-up	

=== BWF Grand Prix (1 title, 1 runner-up) ===
The BWF Grand Prix had two levels, the Grand Prix and Grand Prix Gold. It was a series of badminton tournaments sanctioned by the Badminton World Federation (BWF) and played between 2007 and 2017.

Men's singles
Year	Tournament	Opponent	Score	Result	Ref.
2016	U.S. Open	(South Korea) Lee Hyun-il	22–24, 8–21	(silver) Runner-up	
2017	Canada Open	(Japan) Kento Momota	22–20, 14–21, 21–14	(gold) Winner	

BWF Grand Prix Gold tournament
BWF Grand Prix tournament

=== BWF International Challenge/Series (2 titles, 2 runners-up) ===
Men's singles
Year	Tournament	Opponent	Score	Result	Ref.
2016	Austrian Open	(Denmark) Anders Antonsen	9–21, 17–21	(silver) Runner-up	
2016	Finnish Open	(Vietnam) Nguyễn Tiến Minh	21–10, 21–14	(gold) Winner	
2016	Spanish International	(Denmark) Anders Antonsen	21–14, 20–22, 18–21	(silver) Runner-up	
2017	Austrian Open	(Spain) Pablo Abián	21–10, 12–21, 21–11	(gold) Winner	

BWF International Challenge tournament

== Performance timeline ==
Key

W	Won	F	Finalist	SF	Semi-finalist
QF	Quarter-finalist	#R	Rounds 4, 3, 2, 1	RR	Round-robin stage
Q#	Qualification round	A	Absent	w/d	Withdrew
G	Gold	S	Silver	B	Bronze
NH	Not held	N/A	Not applicable	DNQ	Did not qualify

=== National team ===
- Junior level

Team events	2014	Ref
Asian Junior Championships	B	
World Junior Championships	B	

- Senior level

Team events	2018	2019	2020	2021	2022	2023	Ref
Asian Mixed Team Championships	NH	S	NH			A	
Asian Team Championships	QF	NH	B	NH	A	NH	
Asian Games	B	NH			B	NH	
Thomas Cup	S	NH	B	NH	B	NH	
Sudirman Cup	NH	A	NH	A	NH	B	

=== Individual competitions ===
- Junior level

Events	2013	2014	Ref
Asian Junior Championships	A	S	
World Junior Championships	4R	QF	

- Senior level

Events	2017	2018	2019	2020	2021	2022	2023	2024	Ref
Asian Championships	2R	2R	1R	NH		QF	B	1R	
World Championships	2R	QF	3R	NH	2R	1R	3R	NH	
Olympic Games	NH			2R	NH			DNQ	

Tournament	BWF Superseries / Grand Prix				BWF World Tour							Best	Ref
Tournament	2014	2015	2016	2017	2018	2019	2020	2021	2022	2023	2024	Best	Ref
Malaysia Open	A				1R	QF	NH		A	SF	1R	SF ('23)	
India Open	A			1R	A		NH		A	A	1R	1R ('17, '24)	
Indonesia Masters	A				1R	2R	1R	1R	A	QF	A	QF ('23)	
Thailand Masters	N/A		A				2R	NH		A	A	2R ('20)	
German Open	A			3R	2R	QF	NH		A	2R	A	QF ('19)	
French Open	A				1R	2R	NH	W	2R	A	1R	W ('21)	
All England Open	A				1R	QF	2R	QF	A	1R	1R	QF ('19, '21)	
Orléans Masters	A						NH	A		1R	A	1R ('23)	
Swiss Open	A			QF	A		NH	A			1R	QF ('17)	
Spain Masters	N/A				A				NH	F	A	F ('23)	
Thailand Open	A	2R	A		W	SF	A	NH	A			W ('18)	
Malaysia Masters	A	Q1	A			1R	1R	NH	QF	1R	A	QF ('23)	
Singapore Open	A					1R	NH		A	1R	1R	1R ('19, '23, '24)	
Indonesia Open	A				QF	1R	NH	2R	1R	1R	1R	QF ('18)	
Australian Open	A			2R	A	1R	NH		1R	1R	A	2R ('17)	
New Zealand Open	A					SF	NH					SF ('19)	
U.S. Open	A	2R	F	QF	A		NH			A		F ('16)	
Canada Open	A			W	A		NH		A	1R	A	W ('17)	
Japan Open	Q1	Q2	Q1	1R	1R	2R	NH		QF	2R	2R	QF ('22)	
Korea Open	A			1R	1R	1R	NH		A	1R	A	1R ('17, '18, '19, '23)	
Taipei Open	A	Q1	A				NH		A	2R	A	2R ('23)	
Hong Kong Open	A			1R	2R	1R	NH			2R	A	2R ('18, '23)	
Vietnam Open	QF	A					NH		w/d	A	A	QF ('14)	
China Open	A				1R	QF	NH			QF	A	QF ('19, '23)	
Macau Open	A			QF	A		NH				A	QF ('17)	
Arctic Open	N/A						NH			SF	A	SF ('23)	
Denmark Open	A				2R	1R	A	2R	2R	1R	A	2R ('18, '21, '22)	
Hylo Open	A								2R	A		2R ('22)	
Korea Masters	A	2R	w/d	A		W	NH		A			W ('19)	
Japan Masters	N/A									1R	A	1R ('23)	
China Masters	A			QF	1R	1R	NH			SF	A	F ('23)	
Chinese Taipei Masters	A	2R	3R	N/A								3R ('16)	
Yonex / K&D Graphics International	A	QF	A				N/A					QF ('15)	
Year-end ranking	289	140	51	28	14	10	12	12	23	13	-	10	
Tournament	2014	2015	2016	2017	2018	2019	2020	2021	2022	2023	2024	Best	Ref

== Record against selected opponents ==
Record against year-end Finals finalists, World Championships semi-finalists, and Olympic quarter-finalists. Accurate as of 23 August 2026.

Player	M	W	L	Diff.
(China) Chen Long	2	1	1	0
(China) Lin Dan	5	2	3	–1
(China) Shi Yuqi	6	0	6	–6
(China) Tian Houwei	1	1	0	+1
(China) Zhao Junpeng	3	3	0	+3
(Chinese Taipei) Chou Tien-chen	10	3	7	–4
(Denmark) Anders Antonsen	9	2	7	–5
(Denmark) Viktor Axelsen	7	1	6	–5
(Denmark) Jan Ø. Jørgensen	2	2	0	+2
(Denmark) Hans-Kristian Vittinghus	5	0	5	–5
(England) Rajiv Ouseph	2	0	2	–2
(France) Christo Popov	1	1	0	+1
(Guatemala) Kevin Cordón	1	1	0	+1
(India) Srikanth Kidambi	3	3	0	+3
(India) Parupalli Kashyap	1	1	0	+1
(India) Prannoy H. S.	6	3	3	0

Player	M	W	L	Diff.
(India) B. Sai Praneeth	2	1	1	0
(India) Lakshya Sen	4	0	4	–4
(Indonesia) Anthony Sinisuka Ginting	9	5	4	+1
(Indonesia) Sony Dwi Kuncoro	1	1	0	+1
(Indonesia) Tommy Sugiarto	1	1	0	+1
(Japan) Kento Momota	7	3	4	–1
(Japan) Kodai Naraoka	2	1	1	0
(Malaysia) Lee Zii Jia	3	0	3	–3
(Malaysia) Liew Daren	7	5	2	+3
(Singapore) Loh Kean Yew	3	1	2	–2
(South Korea) Heo Kwang-hee	2	2	0	+2
(South Korea) Lee Hyun-il	2	1	1	0
(South Korea) Son Wan-ho	2	0	2	–2
(Thailand) Kunlavut Vitidsarn	1	0	1	–1
(Thailand) Kantaphon Wangcharoen	2	0	2	–2
(Vietnam) Nguyễn Tiến Minh	3	3	0	+3
