= Sayaka Takahashi =

Japanese badminton player (born 1992)

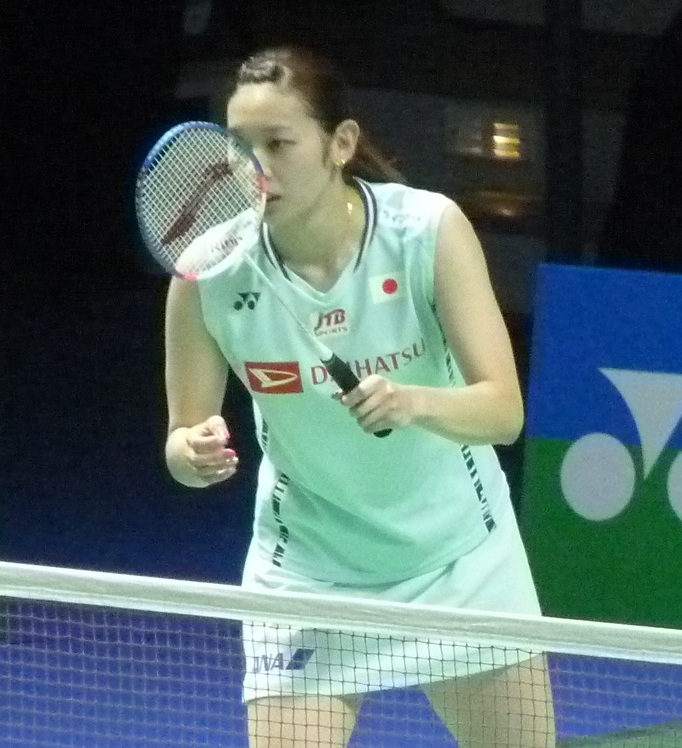
- Takahashi at the 2022 German Open

Personal information
- Born: 29 July 1992 (age 34) Kashihara, Nara, Japan
- Height: 1.68 m (5 ft 6 in)
- Weight: 60 kg (132 lb; 9 st 6 lb)

Sport
- Country: Japan
- Sport: Badminton
- Handedness: Left
- Retired: 31 March 2023

Women's singles
- Career record: 256 wins, 120 losses
- Highest ranking: 10 (12 February 2019)
- BWF profile
Medal record
Women's badminton
Representing Japan
Sudirman Cup
Silver medal – second place	2021 Vantaa	Mixed team
Uber Cup
Gold medal – first place	2018 Bangkok	Women's team
Silver medal – second place	2014 New Delhi	Women's team
Silver medal – second place	2020 Aarhus	Women's team
Bronze medal – third place	2022 Bangkok	Women's team
Asian Games
Bronze medal – third place	2014 Incheon	Women's team
Asian Championships
Bronze medal – third place	2013 Taipei	Women's singles
Bronze medal – third place	2014 Gimcheon	Women's singles
Asia Mixed Team Championships
Silver medal – second place	2019 Hong Kong	Mixed team
Asia Team Championships
Gold medal – first place	2020 Manila	Women's team
Asian Junior Championships
Bronze medal – third place	2009 Kuala Lumpur	Mixed team

Sayaka Takahashi (高橋 沙也加, Takahashi Sayaka; born 29 July 1992) is a retired Japanese badminton player. She competed in the women's singles event and reached a career-high world ranking of No. 10. She was a member of the Japanese national team and played for the BIPROGY badminton team.

Takahashi won bronze medals at the 2013 and 2014 Asian Championships. She won three BWF Grand Prix titles between 2013 and 2017 and four BWF World Tour titles in 2018, including the Super 500 Singapore Open. She later reached her first Super 750 final at the French Open.

In team competition, Takahashi was part of the Japanese team that won the 2018 Uber Cup, Japan's first title in the competition since 1981. She helped Japan retain the women's team title at the 2020 Asian Team Championships. She also earned silver medals at the 2014 and 2020 Uber Cups and the 2021 Sudirman Cup, as well as bronze medals at the 2014 Asian Games and 2022 Uber Cup.

== Early life ==
Takahashi was born in Kashihara, Nara, and began playing badminton in the second grade of elementary school. She trained with Kashihara Junior, where her mother was involved as a coach. Growing up alongside her older sister, badminton player Ayaka Takahashi, she felt pressure to match her sister's achievements and disliked being known simply as "Ayaka Takahashi's younger sister". This influenced her decision to attend different schools from Ayaka. In 2004, she won the girls' A division of the National Elementary School ABC Tournament.

Takahashi attended Wago Junior High School in Toyama, where she won the singles title at the All Japan Junior High School Championships in 2007. She subsequently attended Toyama Prefectural Takaoka Nishi High School. In 2008, she and Kanako Konishi won the girls' doubles title at the All Japan Junior Championships. The following year, Takahashi represented Japan at the Asian Junior Championships in Kuala Lumpur, reaching the quarterfinals in both girls' singles and doubles and earning a bronze medal with the Japanese mixed team.

In her final year of high school in 2010, Takahashi won the singles titles at both the National High School Selection Championships and the Inter-High School Championships, while finishing runner-up in doubles at both events. She also reached the women's doubles quarterfinals at the 2010 World Junior Championships in Mexico. After graduating from Takaoka Nishi High School, she joined Panasonic's corporate badminton team.

== Career ==
=== 2012–2014 ===
Takahashi began her international career in 2012 by claiming four titles on the BWF International Challenge and Series circuits, winning the Austrian, Osaka, Maldives, and Scottish International tournaments. That same year, she reached her first Grand Prix-level final at the Malaysia Open, where she finished runner-up to Busanan Ongbamrungphan. She later reached the final of the Canada Open, finishing runner-up to Nozomi Okuhara.

In April 2013, Takahashi won her first Grand Prix Gold title at the Australian Open, defeating Thailand's Nitchaon Jindapol in the final. Later that month, she secured a bronze medal at the Asian Championships in Taipei, where she lost to world number one Li Xuerui in the semifinals. By November 2013, Takahashi had risen to world number 13, making her the highest-ranked Japanese women's singles player at the time.

In March 2014, Takahashi won the German Open, defeating top seed Sung Ji-hyun of South Korea in the final. The following month, she won her second consecutive bronze medal at the Asian Championships in Gimcheon, South Korea, after losing to Sung in the semifinals. In May, Takahashi was part of the Japanese team that finished runner-up at the Uber Cup in New Delhi. She played the second singles match in the final against China, losing to Wang Shixian. At the Asian Games in Incheon later that year, she was part of the Japanese women's team that won a bronze medal. In the Asian Games individual women's singles event, Takahashi was eliminated in the first round by Tai Tzu-ying of Chinese Taipei.

=== 2015–2017 ===
In early 2015, Takahashi won the Portugal International and Osaka International. In October, she suffered a right knee injury while attempting to qualify for the 2016 Summer Olympics in Rio de Janeiro. The injury sidelined her from international competition for 11 months, ending her attempt to qualify for the Olympics. During her rehabilitation, Takahashi watched her older sister Ayaka Takahashi and Misaki Matsutomo win Japan's first Olympic gold medal in badminton in the women's doubles event. Takahashi later revealed that she had been close to quitting the sport, but was encouraged to continue by her sister's Olympic success and her encouragement for them to play and win together.

Takahashi returned to international competition in September 2016 at the Japan Open, progressing from the qualifying rounds to the quarterfinals before losing to China's Sun Yu. During the tournament, Takahashi said that she wanted to establish her own identity as a player rather than simply being known as Ayaka Takahashi's younger sister. In November, she won the Malaysia International, her first international title since returning from injury. She also reached the quarterfinals of the All Japan Championships in December.

In 2017, Takahashi won the Portugal International and Osaka International. In September, she won the Vietnam Open, defeating home favourite Vũ Thị Trang in the final.

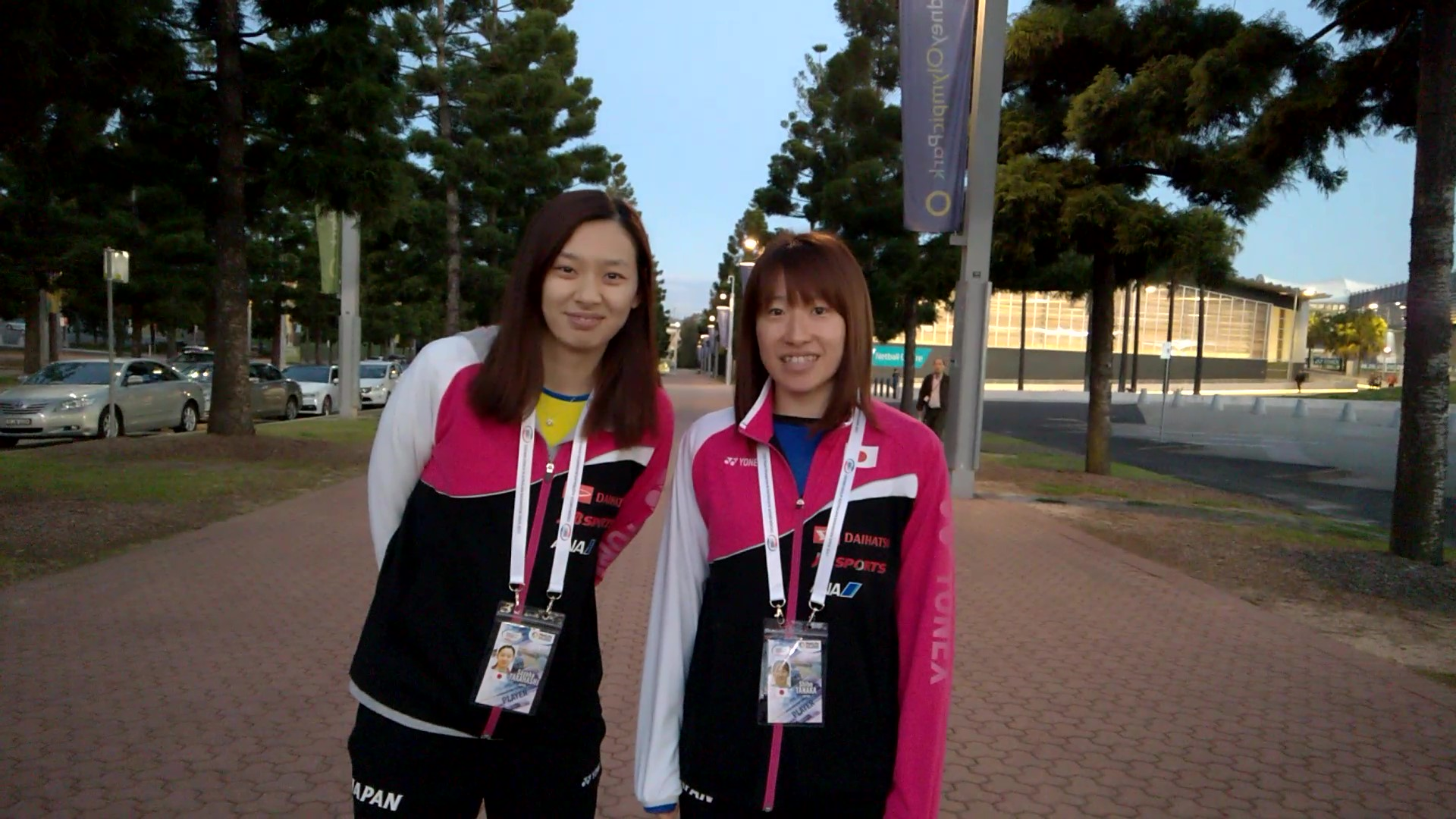
Takahashi (left) with Shiho Tanaka at the 2017 Australian Open

=== 2018–2020 ===
In February 2018, Takahashi won her maiden BWF World Tour title at the Super 300 Swiss Open, defeating compatriot Natsuki Nidaira. In May, she claimed another Super 300 title at the New Zealand Open, defeating China's Zhang Yiman in the final. Later that month, Takahashi was part of the Japanese team that won the Uber Cup in Bangkok, Japan's first title in the competition since 1981.

In June, Takahashi finished runner-up at the Canada Open, losing to 2012 Olympic champion Li Xuerui of China. The following month, she won her first Super 500 title at the Singapore Open, defeating China's Gao Fangjie in the final. Later that month, Takahashi won the inaugural Akita Masters, defeating compatriot Mako Urushizaki. The victory was her fourth World Tour title of the season.

In February 2019, Takahashi reached a career-high world ranking of No. 10. In September, she reached the semifinals of the China Open, defeating sixth seed Ratchanok Intanon in the quarterfinals before losing to reigning Olympic champion Carolina Marín.

In February 2020, Takahashi helped Japan retain the women's team title at the Asian Team Championships in Manila, defeating Sung Ji-hyun in the second singles match to secure Japan's victory over South Korea in the final. Later in 2020, Takahashi suffered a severe lower back injury that threatened to derail her career. She later said that she had considered quitting badminton during the difficult period and that it took around four months to recover.

=== 2021–2023 ===
Takahashi returned to represent Japan at the Sudirman Cup in September 2021, helping the team win a silver medal despite being only 90 percent fit. The following week, Takahashi captained the Japanese women's team at the postponed Uber Cup in Aarhus, Denmark, where Japan finished runner-up to China. Later in October, Takahashi reached her first Super 750 final at the French Open, defeating P. V. Sindhu in the semifinals. She finished runner-up after losing the final to compatriot Akane Yamaguchi.

In March 2022, Takahashi reached the quarterfinals of the All England Open after defeating world No. 7 P. V. Sindhu in the second round. In May, she captained the Japanese women's team at the Uber Cup in Bangkok, where Japan won a bronze medal. In June, Takahashi suffered a right calf muscle tear during the Indonesia Open, forcing her to retire from her second-round match. The injury kept her out of competition for two months before she returned at the World Championships in Tokyo in August. In her opening match, Takahashi defeated South Korea's Kim Ga-eun in three games after receiving encouragement from her sister Ayaka. She was eliminated in the third round by eventual champion Akane Yamaguchi. Following the Japan Open, Takahashi announced on 20 September that she was withdrawing from the Japanese national team, citing her repeated struggles with injuries and a feeling that she had accomplished what she had set out to do.

Takahashi continued to compete domestically for her corporate team, BIPROGY, in the S/J League. The league's final stage in February 2023 marked the end of her competitive career. On 3 April, BIPROGY announced that Takahashi had retired and left the company effective 31 March 2023.

== Personal life ==
Takahashi is the younger sister of Ayaka Takahashi, who is a badminton doubles player.

== Achievements ==
=== Asian Championships ===
Women's singles
Year	Venue	Opponent	Score	Result	Ref.
2013	Taipei Arena, Taipei, Taiwan	(China) Li Xuerui	18–21, 21–18, 12–21	Bronze	
2014	Gimcheon Indoor Stadium, Gimcheon, South Korea	(South Korea) Sung Ji-hyun	21–23, 13–21	Bronze	

=== BWF World Tour (4 titles, 2 runners-up) ===
The BWF World Tour, which was announced on 19 March 2017 and implemented in 2018, is a series of elite badminton tournaments sanctioned by the Badminton World Federation (BWF). The BWF World Tour is divided into levels of World Tour Finals, Super 1000, Super 750, Super 500, Super 300 (part of the HSBC World Tour), and the BWF Tour Super 100.

Women's singles
Year	Tournament	Level	Opponent	Score	Result	Ref.
2018	Swiss Open	Super 300	(Japan) Natsuki Nidaira	21–12, 21–18	(gold) Winner	
2018	New Zealand Open	Super 300	(China) Zhang Yiman	21–13, 21–14	(gold) Winner	
2018	Canada Open	Super 100	(China) Li Xuerui	20–22, 21–15, 17–21	(silver) Runner-up	
2018	Singapore Open	Super 500	(China) Gao Fangjie	25–23, 21–14	(gold) Winner	
2018	Akita Masters	Super 100	(Japan) Mako Urushizaki	21–11, 13–21, 21–18	(gold) Winner	
2021	French Open	Super 750	(Japan) Akane Yamaguchi	18–21, 12–21	(silver) Runner-up	

=== BWF Grand Prix (3 titles, 3 runners-up) ===
The BWF Grand Prix had two levels, the Grand Prix and Grand Prix Gold. It was a series of badminton tournaments sanctioned by the Badminton World Federation (BWF) and played between 2007 and 2017.

Women's singles
Year	Tournament	Opponent	Score	Result	Ref.
2012	Malaysia Grand Prix Gold	(Thailand) Busanan Ongbamrungphan	17–21, 20–22	(silver) Runner-up	
2012	Canada Open	(Japan) Nozomi Okuhara	8–21, 16–21	(silver) Runner-up	
2013	Australian Open	(Thailand) Nitchaon Jindapol	24–22, 21–10	(gold) Winner	
2014	German Open	(South Korea) Sung Ji-hyun	21–17, 8–21, 21–12	(gold) Winner	
2015	Malaysia Masters	(Japan) Nozomi Okuhara	13–21, 17–21	(silver) Runner-up	
2017	Vietnam Open	(Vietnam) Vũ Thị Trang	21–9, 21–14	(gold) Winner	

BWF Grand Prix Gold tournament
BWF Grand Prix tournament

=== BWF International Challenge/Series (9 titles) ===
Women's singles
Year	Tournament	Opponent	Score	Result	Ref.
2012	Austrian International	(Hong Kong) Chan Tsz Ka	21–17, 21–9	(gold) Winner	
2012	Osaka International	(Japan) Yui Hashimoto	22–20, 21–19	(gold) Winner	
2012	Maldives International	(Japan) Yu Wakita	21–17, 21–16	(gold) Winner	
2012	Scottish International	(South Korea) Kim Hyo-min	21–6, 21–8	(gold) Winner	
2015	Portugal International	(Japan) Aya Ohori	21–13, 21–14	(gold) Winner	
2015	Osaka International	(Japan) Sayaka Sato	21–11, 15–21, 29–27	(gold) Winner	
2016	Malaysia International	(Malaysia) Ho Yen Mei	21–17, 21–11	(gold) Winner	
2017	Portugal International	(Japan) Chisato Hoshi	21–10, 21–15	(gold) Winner	
2017	Osaka International	(South Korea) Lee Jang-mi	21–16, 21–18	(gold) Winner	

BWF International Challenge tournament
BWF International Series tournament

== Record against selected opponents ==
Record against year-end Finals finalists, World Championships semi-finalists, and Olympic quarter-finalists. Accurate as of 15 March 2022.

Player	M	W	L	Diff.
(Bulgaria) Petya Nedelcheva	3	3	0	+3
(China) Chen Yufei	8	0	8	–8
(China) Han Yue	5	3	2	+1
(China) He Bingjiao	5	1	4	–3
(China) Li Xuerui	8	2	6	–4
(China) Wang Shixian	6	0	6	–6
(China) Wang Xin	1	1	0	+1
(China) Wang Yihan	3	1	2	–1
(China) Wang Zhiyi	1	0	1	–1
(China) Zhang Yiman	5	3	2	+1
(Chinese Taipei) Cheng Shao-chieh	2	0	2	–2
(Chinese Taipei) Tai Tzu-ying	7	1	6	–5
(Germany) Juliane Schenk	1	0	1	–1
(Hong Kong) Yip Pui Yin	6	6	0	+6
(India) Saina Nehwal	8	4	4	0
(India) P. V. Sindhu	9	5	4	+1

Player	M	W	L	Diff.
(Indonesia) Lindaweni Fanetri	1	1	0	+1
(Indonesia) Gregoria Mariska Tunjung	1	1	0	+1
(Indonesia) Putri Kusuma Wardani	1	1	0	+1
(Indonesia) Maria Kristin Yulianti	1	1	0	+1
(Japan) Minatsu Mitani	3	3	0	+3
(Japan) Aya Ohori	4	4	0	+4
(Japan) Nozomi Okuhara	9	1	8	–7
(Japan) Akane Yamaguchi	10	0	10	–10
(South Korea) An Se-young	3	0	3	–3
(South Korea) Bae Yeon-ju	4	2	2	0
(South Korea) Sung Ji-hyun	6	2	4	–2
(Spain) Carolina Marín	7	1	6	–5
(Thailand) Porntip Buranaprasertsuk	2	1	1	0
(Thailand) Pornpawee Chochuwong	1	1	0	+1
(Thailand) Ratchanok Intanon	10	4	6	–2
