= Lee Cheuk Yiu =

Hong Kong badminton player (born 1996)

Lee Cheuk Yiu 李卓耀
Personal information
- Born: 28 August 1996 (age 30) Hong Kong
- Height: 1.78 m (5 ft 10 in)

Sport
- Sport: Badminton
- Handedness: Right
- Coached by: Wong Choong Hann

Men's singles
- Highest ranking: 13 (23 January 2024)
- Current ranking: 19 (3 November 2026)
- BWF profile
Medal record
Men's badminton
Representing Hong Kong
Asia Mixed Team Championships
Bronze medal – third place	2019 Hong Kong	Mixed team
Asian Youth Games
Silver medal – second place	2013 Nanjing	Boys' singles
Asia Junior Championships
Bronze medal – third place	2014 Taipei	Boys' singles

Lee Cheuk Yiu (Chinese: 李卓耀; born 28 August 1996) is a Hong Kong badminton player. He won the silver medal at the 2013 Asian Youth Games and a bronze medal at the 2014 Asian Junior Championships.

== Career ==
Lee reached the final of the 2019 Hong Kong Open, after quarter- and semi-final wins against former world champion Viktor Axelsen and former world number one Srikanth Kidambi respectively. He eventually won against Anthony Sinisuka Ginting and secured his first title in a BWF World Tour tournament.

Lee represented Hong Kong at the 2024 Summer Olympics, competing in the men's singles event.

== Achievements ==
=== Asian Youth Games ===
Boys' singles
Year	Venue	Opponent	Score	Result
2013	Nanjing Sport Institute; Nanjing, China	(China) Lin Guipu	22–24, 14–21	Silver

=== Asian Junior Championships ===
Boys' singles
Year	Venue	Opponent	Score	Result
2014	Taipei Gymnasium; Taipei, Taiwan	(China) Shi Yuqi	8–21, 13–21	Bronze

=== BWF World Tour (1 title, 5 runners-up) ===
The BWF World Tour, which was announced on 19 March 2017 and implemented in 2018, is a series of elite badminton tournaments sanctioned by the Badminton World Federation (BWF). The BWF World Tour is divided into levels of World Tour Finals, Super 1000, Super 750, Super 500, Super 300 (part of the HSBC World Tour), and the BWF Tour Super 100.

Men's singles
Year	Tournament	Level	Opponent	Score	Result
2019	Hong Kong Open	Super 500	(Indonesia) Anthony Sinisuka Ginting	16–21, 21–10, 22–20	(gold) Winner
2023	Thailand Open	Super 500	(Thailand) Kunlavut Vitidsarn	12–21, 10–21	(silver) Runner-up
2023	Hylo Open	Super 300	(Chinese Taipei) Chou Tien-chen	23–21, 17–21, 10–21	(silver) Runner-up
2024	India Open	Super 750	(China) Shi Yuqi	21–23, 17–21	(silver) Runner-up
2025	India Open	Super 750	(Denmark) Viktor Axelsen	16–21, 8–21	(silver) Runner-up
2026	China Masters	Super 750	(Hong Kong) Jason Gunawan	9–21, 16–21	(silver) Runner-up

=== BWF Grand Prix (1 title) ===
The BWF Grand Prix had two levels, the Grand Prix and Grand Prix Gold. It was a series of badminton tournaments sanctioned by the Badminton World Federation (BWF) and played between 2007 and 2017.

Men's singles
Year	Tournament	Opponent	Score	Result
2017	New Zealand Open	(Chinese Taipei) Wang Tzu-wei	11–21, 21–15, 22–20	(gold) Winner

BWF Grand Prix Gold tournament
BWF Grand Prix tournament

=== BWF International Challenge/Series (4 runners-up) ===
Men's singles
Year	Tournament	Opponent	Score	Result
2016	Singapore International	(Malaysia) Satheishtharan R.	19–21, 21–19, 13–21	(silver) Runner-up
2017	Kharkiv International	(England) Toby Penty	17–21, 13–21	(silver) Runner-up
2017	Belgian International	(Japan) Kento Momota	14–21, 18–21	(silver) Runner-up
2018	Singapore International	(Indonesia) Krishna Adi Nugraha	12–21, 12–21	(silver) Runner-up

BWF International Challenge tournament
BWF International Series tournament
BWF Future Series tournament
