= 2016 All England Super Series Premier =

Badminton championships

Tournament details
- Dates: 8–13 March
- Edition: 106th
- Level: Super Series Premier
- Total prize money: US$550,000
- Venue: Barclaycard Arena
- Location: Birmingham, England

Champions
- Men's singles: (China) Lin Dan
- Women's singles: (Japan) Nozomi Okuhara
- Men's doubles: (Russia) Vladimir Ivanov (Russia) Ivan Sozonov
- Women's doubles: (Japan) Misaki Matsutomo (Japan) Ayaka Takahashi
- Mixed doubles: (Indonesia) Praveen Jordan (Indonesia) Debby Susanto

The 2016 All England Super Series Premier was the first Super Series tournament of the 2016 BWF Super Series. The tournament took place in Birmingham, England, from 8 to 13 March 2016 and had a total purse of $550,000.

== Men's singles ==
=== Seeds ===
1. (China) Chen Long (second round)
2. (Malaysia) Lee Chong Wei (first round)
3. (Denmark) Jan Ø. Jørgensen (quarterfinals)
4. (Japan) Kento Momota (quarterfinals)
5. (China) Lin Dan (champion)
6. (Denmark) Viktor Axelsen (quarterfinals)
7. (Chinese Taipei) Chou Tien-chen (first round)
8. (China) Tian Houwei (final)

=== Top half ===
First Round
1	(China) Chen L	21	21
Q1	(Japan) K Nishimoto	18	12
(China) Xue S	22	21
(India) H. S. Prannoy	20	15
6	(Denmark) V Axelsen	14	22	22
Q2	(France) B Leverdez	21	20	20
(South Korea) Son W-h	21	11	21
(Japan) T Ueda	11	21	18
3	(Denmark) J Ø. Jørgensen	21	21
(Chinese Taipei) Hsu J-h	14	14
(Hong Kong) Ng K L	21	19	21
(India) A Jayaram	18	21	19
5	(China) Lin D	21	21
(South Korea) Lee D-k	17	17
(Japan) S Sasaki	21	21
(Hong Kong) Wei N	11	18

Second Round
1	(China) Chen L	19	17
(China) Xue S	21	21
6	(Denmark) V Axelsen	21	22	21
(South Korea) Son W-h	19	24	12
3	(Denmark) J Ø. Jørgensen	21	21
(Hong Kong) Ng K L	13	16
5	(China) Lin D	20	21	21
(Japan) S Sasaki	22	6	8

Quarterfinals
(China) Xue S	21	23	21
6	(Denmark) V Axelsen	19	25	11
3	(Denmark) J Ø. Jørgensen	21	9	15
5	(China) Lin D	10	21	21

Semifinals
(China) Xue S	21	15	9
5	(China) Lin D	18	21	21

=== Bottom half ===
First Round
Q3	(India) S Verma	21	21
(Hong Kong) Hu Y	10	14
(Hong Kong) Wong W K	21	19	13
8	(China) Tian HW	14	21	21
(England) R Ouseph	17	12
(India) S Kidambi	21	21
Q4	(Indonesia) J Christie	21	18	13
4	(Japan) K Momota	19	21	21
(Thailand) B Ponsana	10	11
(Germany) M Zwiebler	21	21
(Indonesia) T Sugiarto	21	21
7	(Chinese Taipei) Chou T-c	14	14
(Denmark) H-K Vittinghus	21	17	21
(China) Wang ZM	15	21	10
PFQ	(India) B. S Praneeth	24	22
2	(Malaysia) Lee C W	22	20

Second Round
Q3	(India) S Verma	21	12	19
8	(China) Tian HW	10	21	21
(India) S Kidambi	10	13
4	(Japan) K Momota	21	21
(Germany) M Zwiebler	21	21
(Indonesia) T Sugiarto	14	16
(Denmark) H-K Vittinghus	12	21	21
PFQ	(India) B. S Praneeth	21	11	16

Quarterfinals
8	(China) Tian HW	19	21	21
4	(Japan) K Momota	21	15	16
(Germany) M Zwiebler	15	21	20
(Denmark) H-K Vittinghus	21	13	22

Semifinals
8	(China) Tian HW	15	21	21
(Denmark) H-K Vittinghus	21	14	14

=== Finals ===
Semifinals
(China) Xue Song	21	15	9
5	(China) Lin Dan	18	21	21
8	(China) Tian Houwei	15	21	21
(Denmark) Hans-Kristian Vittinghus	21	14	14

Final
5	(China) Lin Dan	21	21
8	(China) Tian Houwei	9	10

== Women's singles ==
=== Seeds ===
1. (Spain) Carolina Marín (semifinals)
2. (India) Saina Nehwal (quarterfinals)
3. (China) Li Xuerui (quarterfinals)
4. (China) Wang Yihan (quarterfinals)
5. (South Korea) Sung Ji Hyun (second round)
6. (Thailand) Ratchanok Intanon (quarterfinals)
7. (China) Wang Shixian (final)
8. (Japan) Nozomi Okuhara (champion)

=== Top half ===
First Round
1	(Spain) C Marín	25	20	21
(South Korea) Bae Y-j	23	22	15
(Germany) K Schnaase	19	14
(Indonesia) M F Kusumastuti	21	21
6	(Thailand) R Intanon	21	21
(China) Sun Y	17	16
(Scotland) K Gilmour	17	17
(Japan) A Yamaguchi	21	21
4	(China) Wang YH	21	21
(Hong Kong) Cheung N Y	13	18
(Chinese Taipei) Pai Y-p	21	10	10
Q3	(China) He BJ	18	21	21
8	(Japan) N Okuhara	21	21
(Thailand) N Jindapol	13	15
(Indonesia) L Fanetri	21	21
(Malaysia) Tee J Y	11	18

Second Round
1	(Spain) C Marín	21	21
(Indonesia) M F Kusumastuti	17	7
6	(Thailand) R Intanon	21	21
(Japan) A Yamaguchi	9	13
4	(China) Wang YH	21	23
Q3	(China) He BJ	18	21
8	(Japan) N Okuhara	21	21
(Indonesia) L Fanetri	11	10

Quarterfinals
1	(Spain) C Marín	21	21
6	(Thailand) R Intanon	17	19
4	(China) Wang YH	9	13
8	(Japan) N Okuhara	21	21

Semifinals
1	(Spain) C Marín	21	16	14
8	(Japan) N Okuhara	11	21	21

=== Bottom half ===
First Round
Q1	(United States) Zhang BW	21	21
(Japan) M Mitani	14	19
(Denmark) L Kjaersfeldt	12	12
7	(China) Wang SX	21	21
(India) P. V. Sindhu	21	17	12
(Thailand) P Buranaprasertsuk	18	21	21
(Chinese Taipei) Hsu Y-c	12	16
3	(China) Li XR	21	21
(Chinese Taipei) Tai T-y	22	21
(Japan) S Sato	20	16
Q4	(Hong Kong) Yip P Y	9	8
5	(South Korea) Sung J-h	21	21
Q2	(Germany) O Konon	8	9
(Thailand) B Ongbamrungphan	21	21
(Canada) M Li	17	12
2	(India) S Nehwal	21	21

Second Round
Q1	(United States) Zhang BW	16	11
7	(China) Wang SX	21	21
(Thailand) P Buranaprasertsuk	25	13
3	(China) Li XR	27	21
(Chinese Taipei) Tai T-y	21	23
5	(South Korea) Sung J-h	13	21
(Thailand) B Ongbamrungphan	16	9
2	(India) S Nehwal	21	21

Quarterfinals
7	(China) Wang SX	16	21	21
3	(China) Li XR	21	18	17
(Chinese Taipei) Tai T-y	21	21
2	(India) S Nehwal	15	16

Semifinals
7	(China) Wang SX	21	21	21
(Chinese Taipei) Tai T-y	23	12	15

=== Finals ===
Semifinals
1	(Spain) Carolina Marín	21	16	14
8	(Japan) Nozomi Okuhara	11	21	21
7	(China) Wang Shixian	21	21	21
(Chinese Taipei) Tai Tzu-ying	23	12	15

Final
8	(Japan) Nozomi Okuhara	21	16	21
7	(China) Wang Shixian	11	21	19

== Men's doubles ==
=== Seeds ===
1. (South Korea) Lee Yong-dae / Yoo Yeon-seong (semifinals)
2. (Indonesia) Mohammad Ahsan / Hendra Setiawan (second round)
3. (China) Fu Haifeng / Zhang Nan (quarterfinals)
4. (Denmark) Mathias Boe / Carsten Mogensen (withdrew)
5. (China) Chai Biao / Hong Wei (second round)
6. (Japan) Hiroyuki Endo / Kenichi Hayakawa (final)
7. (South Korea) Kim Gi-jung / Kim Sa-rang (second round)
8. (Denmark) Mads Conrad-Petersen / Mads Pieler Kolding (second round)

=== Top half ===
First Round
1	(South Korea) Lee Y-d (South Korea) Yoo Y-s	21	20	21
(Japan) T Kamura (Japan) K Sonoda	17	22	18
Q4	(England) M Nottingham (England) H Towler	18	20
(China) Liu C (China) Lu K	21	22
7	(South Korea) Kim G-j (South Korea) Kim S-r	21	21
(Germany) M Fuchs (Germany) J Schöttler	12	18
(England) M Ellis (England) C Langridge	21	21
(Chinese Taipei) Chen H-l (Chinese Taipei) Wang C-l	19	14
PFQ	(Chinese Taipei) Lee J-h (Chinese Taipei) Lee Y	16	15
Q1	(France) B Kersaudy (France) G Mittelheisser	21	21
(Indonesia) B Angriawan (Indonesia) R A Saputro	13	13
(China) Liu XL (China) Qiu ZH	21	21
8	(Denmark) M Conrad-Petersen (Denmark) M Pieler Kolding	21	21
PFQ	(Chinese Taipei) Liao M-c (Chinese Taipei) Tseng M-h	11	14
Q2	(Germany) R Beck (Germany) P Kaesbauer	17	14
(Russia) V Ivanov (Russia) I Sozonov	21	21

Second Round
1	(South Korea) Lee Y-d (South Korea) Yoo Y-s	23	22	21
(China) Liu C (China) Lu K	25	20	17
7	(South Korea) Kim G-j (South Korea) Kim S-r	21	15	16
(England) M Ellis (England) C Langridge	14	21	21
Q1	(France) B Kersaudy (France) G Mittelheisser	12	17
(China) Liu XL (China) Qiu ZH	21	21
8	(Denmark) M Conrad-Petersen (Denmark) M Pieler Kolding	19	15
(Russia) V Ivanov (Russia) I Sozonov	21	21

Quarterfinals
1	(South Korea) Lee Y-d (South Korea) Yoo Y-s	21	21
(England) M Ellis (England) C Langridge	17	11
(China) Liu XL (China) Qiu ZH	17	21	17
(Russia) V Ivanov (Russia) I Sozonov	21	19	21

Semifinals
1	(South Korea) Lee Y-d (South Korea) Yoo Y-s	21	17	15
(Russia) V Ivanov (Russia) I Sozonov	14	21	21

=== Bottom half ===
First Round
(Indonesia) A Pratama (Indonesia) R K Suwardi	24	21
(Chinese Taipei) Lee S-m (Chinese Taipei) Tsai C-h	22	13
Q3	(Germany) M Lamsfuss (Germany) M E Seidel	10	20
6	(Japan) H Endo (Japan) K Hayakawa	21	22
(South Korea) Ko S-h (South Korea) Shin B-c	21	14	21
(China) Wang YL (China) Zhang W	10	21	9
(Indonesia) M F Gideon (Indonesia) K S Sukamuljo	14	21	17
3	(China) Fu HF (China) Zhang N	21	19	21
(Thailand) B Issara (Thailand) N Puangpuapech	21	13	9
(Malaysia) Goh V S (Malaysia) Tan W K	16	21	21
(Thailand) D Puavaranukroh (Thailand) K Kedren	19	14
5	(China) Chai B (China) Hong W	21	21
(India) M Attri (India) B. S Reddy	21	13	15
(Malaysia) Koo K K (Malaysia) Tan B H	16	21	21
(Denmark) K Astrup (Denmark) A S Rasmussen	22	16	13
2	(Indonesia) M Ahsan (Indonesia) H Setiawan	20	21	21

Second Round
(Indonesia) A Pratama (Indonesia) R K Suwardi	21	15	14
6	(Japan) H Endo (Japan) K Hayakawa	14	21	21
(South Korea) Ko S-h (South Korea) Shin B-c	18	21	17
3	(China) Fu HF (China) Zhang N	21	15	21
(Malaysia) Goh V S (Malaysia) Tan W K	17	24	23
5	(China) Chai B (China) Hong W	21	22	21
(Malaysia) Koo K K (Malaysia) Tan B H	21	15	21
2	(Indonesia) M Ahsan (Indonesia) H Setiawan	15	21	17

Quarterfinals
6	(Japan) H Endo (Japan) K Hayakawa	21	21
3	(China) Fu HF (China) Zhang N	19	12
(Malaysia) Goh V S (Malaysia) Tan W K	21	22
(Malaysia) Koo K K (Malaysia) Tan B H	19	20

Semifinals
6	(Japan) H Endo (Japan) K Hayakawa	21	21
(Malaysia) Goh V S (Malaysia) Tan W K	13	15

=== Finals ===
Semifinals
1	(South Korea) Lee Yong-dae (South Korea) Yoo Yeon-seong	21	17	15
(Russia) Vladimir Ivanov (Russia) Ivan Sozonov	14	21	21
6	(Japan) Hiroyuki Endo (Japan) Kenichi Hayakawa	21	21
(Malaysia) Goh V Shem (Malaysia) Tan Wee Kiong	13	15

Final
(Russia) Vladimir Ivanov (Russia) Ivan Sozonov	21	21	21
6	(Japan) Hiroyuki Endo (Japan) Kenichi Hayakawa	23	18	16

== Women's doubles ==
=== Seeds ===
1. (China) Luo Ying / Luo Yu (semifinals)
2. (Indonesia) Nitya Krishinda Maheswari / Greysia Polii (first round)
3. (Japan) Misaki Matsutomo / Ayaka Takahashi (champion)
4. (Denmark) Christinna Pedersen / Kamilla Rytter Juhl (semifinals)
5. (China) Tian Qing / Zhao Yunlei (quarterfinals)
6. (China) Tang Yuanting / Yu Yang (final)
7. (South Korea) Jung Kyung-eun / Shin Seung-chan (quarterfinals)
8. (South Korea) Chang Ye-na / Lee So-hee (quarterfinals)

=== Top half ===
First Round
1	(China) Luo Y (China) Luo Y	21	13	21
(South Korea) Eom H-w (South Korea) Kim H-n	16	21	18
(Chinese Taipei) Hsu Y-c (Chinese Taipei) Pai Y-p	17	13
(China) Chen QC (China) Jia YF	21	21
8	(South Korea) Chang Y-n (South Korea) Lee S-h	21	21
(Chinese Taipei) Hsieh P-c (Chinese Taipei) Wu T-j	14	10
(Netherlands) E Muskens (Netherlands) S Piek	22	14	21
(South Korea) Go A-r (South Korea) Yoo H-w	20	21	12
3	(Japan) M Matsutomo (Japan) A Takahashi	21	21
Q2	(Chinese Taipei) Chen H-h (Chinese Taipei) Huang M-c	11	11
(Thailand) J Kititharakul (Thailand) R Prajongjai	12	18
(Germany) J Goliszewski (Germany) C Nelte	21	21
5	(China) Tian Q (China) Zhao YL	21	21
PFQ	(Denmark) M Fruergaard (Denmark) S Thygesen	10	16
Q1	(Germany) L Efler (Germany) L Kaepplein	13	9
(Thailand) P Supajirakul (Thailand) S Taerattanachai	21	21

Second Round
1	(China) Luo Y (China) Luo Y	21	21
(China) Chen QC (China) Jia YF	15	17
8	(South Korea) Chang Y-n (South Korea) Lee S-h	21	21
(Netherlands) E Muskens (Netherlands) S Piek	9	16
3	(Japan) M Matsutomo (Japan) A Takahashi	21	21
(Germany) J Goliszewski (Germany) C Nelte	14	12
5	(China) Tian Q (China) Zhao YL	24	23
(Thailand) P Supajirakul (Thailand) S Taerattanachai	22	21

Quarterfinals
1	(China) Luo Y (China) Luo Y	21	9	21
8	(South Korea) Chang Y-n (South Korea) Lee S-h	19	21	13
3	(Japan) M Matsutomo (Japan) A Takahashi	21	13	21
5	(China) Tian Q (China) Zhao YL	6	21	15

Semifinals
1	(China) Luo Y (China) Luo Y	12	9
3	(Japan) M Matsutomo (Japan) A Takahashi	21	21

=== Bottom half ===
First Round
(Indonesia) D D Haris (Indonesia) R E Putri Sari	w	/	o
(Germany) I Herttrich (Germany) B Michels
Q4	(Switzerland) N Fankhauser (Malaysia) S Saniru	6	10
7	(South Korea) Jung K-e (South Korea) Shin S-c	21	21
(Indonesia) A S Awanda (Indonesia) N K Mahadewi Istirani	21	21	21
(Bulgaria) G Stoeva (Bulgaria) S Stoeva	23	18	15
Q3	(England) J Moore (England) V Williams	13	12
4	(Denmark) C Pedersen (Denmark) K Rytter Juhl	21	21
(India) J Gutta (India) A Ponnappa	24	17
(Netherlands) S Barning (Netherlands) I Tabeling	26	21
PFQ	(China) Huang YQ (China) Tang JH	19	19
6	(China) Tang YT (China) Yu Y	21	21
(Japan) S Matsuo (Japan) M Naito	21	21
(England) H Olver (England) L Smith	10	12
(Japan) N Fukuman (Japan) K Yonao	21	23
2	(Indonesia) N K Maheswari (Indonesia) G Polii	18	21

Second Round
(Indonesia) D D Haris (Indonesia) R E Putri Sari	12	19
7	(South Korea) Jung K-e (South Korea) Shin S-c	21	21
(Indonesia) A S Awanda (Indonesia) N K Mahadewi Istirani	15	15
4	(Denmark) C Pedersen (Denmark) K Rytter Juhl	21	21
(Netherlands) S Barning (Netherlands) I Tabeling	6	16
6	(China) Tang YT (China) Yu Y	21	21
(Japan) S Matsuo (Japan) M Naito	21	15	17
(Japan) N Fukuman (Japan) K Yonao	10	21	21

Quarterfinals
7	(South Korea) Jung K-e (South Korea) Shin S-c	21	15	12
4	(Denmark) C Pedersen (Denmark) K Rytter Juhl	18	21	21
6	(China) Tang YT (China) Yu Y	21	21
(Japan) N Fukuman (Japan) K Yonao	15	7

Semifinals
4	(Denmark) C Pedersen (Denmark) K Rytter Juhl	19	21	14
6	(China) Tang YT (China) Yu Y	21	9	21

=== Finals ===
Semifinals
1	(China) Luo Ying (China) Luo Yu	12	9
3	(Japan) Misaki Matsutomo (Japan) Ayaka Takahashi	21	21
4	(Denmark) Christinna Pedersen (Denmark) Kamilla Rytter Juhl	19	21	14
6	(China) Tang Yuanting (China) Yu Yang	21	9	21

Final
3	(Japan) Misaki Matsutomo (Japan) Ayaka Takahashi	21	21
6	(China) Tang Yuanting (China) Yu Yang	10	12

== Mixed doubles ==
=== Seeds ===
1. (China) Zhang Nan / Zhao Yunlei (semifinals)
2. (Indonesia) Tontowi Ahmad / Lilyana Natsir (quarterfinals)
3. (China) Liu Cheng / Bao Yixin (quarterfinals)
4. (South Korea) Ko Sung-hyun / Kim Ha-na (second round)
5. (Denmark) Joachim Fischer Nielsen / Christinna Pedersen (final)
6. (China) Xu Chen / Ma Jin (quarterfinals)
7. (England) Chris Adcock / Gabrielle Adcock (semifinals)
8. (Indonesia) Praveen Jordan / Debby Susanto (champion)

=== Top half ===
First Round
1	(China) Zhang N (China) Zhao YL	21	21
(South Korea) Choi S-g (South Korea) Eom H-w	13	17
Q2	(South Korea) Yoo Y-s (South Korea) Chang Y-n	13	14
(Thailand) B Issara (Thailand) S Amitrapai	21	21
6	(China) Xu C (China) Ma J	21	21
(France) R Labar (France) E Lefel	15	10
PFQ	(Chinese Taipei) Lee J-h (Chinese Taipei) Wu T-j	17	13
Q1	(Thailand) D Puavaranukroh (Thailand) S Taerattanachai	21	21
3	(China) Liu C (China) Bao YX	21	21
(Japan) K Sonoda (Japan) N Fukuman	9	13
(Hong Kong) Lee C H (Hong Kong) Chau H W	15	21	12
(China) Lu K (China) Huang YQ	21	19	21
8	(Indonesia) P Jordan (Indonesia) D Susanto	21	21
(Singapore) D B Chrisnanta (Singapore) Vanessa Neo Y Y	14	17
(Japan) K Kazuno (Japan) A Kurihara	21	21
Q4	(Germany) M E Seidel (Germany) L Efler	19	12

Second Round
1	(China) Zhang N (China) Zhao YL	21	21
(Thailand) B Issara (Thailand) S Amitrapai	13	14
6	(China) Xu C (China) Ma J	21	22
Q1	(Thailand) D Puavaranukroh (Thailand) S Taerattanachai	14	20
3	(China) Liu C (China) Bao YX	21	21
(China) Lu K (China) Huang YQ	19	19
8	(Indonesia) P Jordan (Indonesia) D Susanto	13	21	21
(Japan) K Kazuno (Japan) A Kurihara	21	14	18

Quarterfinals
1	(China) Zhang N (China) Zhao YL	21	21
6	(China) Xu C (China) Ma J	16	13
3	(China) Liu C (China) Bao YX	14	21
8	(Indonesia) P Jordan (Indonesia) D Susanto	21	23

Semifinals
1	(China) Zhang N (China) Zhao YL	19	16
8	(Indonesia) P Jordan (Indonesia) D Susanto	21	21

=== Bottom half ===
First Round
(South Korea) Shin B-c (South Korea) Chae Y-j	19	21	21
(Netherlands) J Arends (Netherlands) S Piek	21	16	15
PFQ	(South Korea) Lee Y-d (South Korea) Lee S-h	17	18
5	(Denmark) J Fischer Nielsen (Denmark) C Pedersen	21	21
(Germany) M Fuchs (Germany) B Michels	21	18	11
(China) Wang Y (China) Tang JH	19	21	21
(Malaysia) Chan P S (Malaysia) Goh L Y	21	17	20
4	(South Korea) Ko S-h (South Korea) Kim H-n	16	21	22
(Russia) V Durkin (Russia) N Vislova	18	15
(South Korea) Kim G-j (South Korea) Shin S-c	21	21
(Indonesia) R Alexander (Indonesia) M D Oktaviani	22	12
7	(England) C Adcock (England) G Adcock	24	21
(Indonesia) E Subaktiar (Indonesia) G E Widjaja	14	21	21
(Chinese Taipei) Liao M-c (Chinese Taipei) Chen H-h	21	17	15
Q3	(Chinese Taipei) Lee Y (Chinese Taipei) Hsieh P-c	15	16
2	(Indonesia) T Ahmad (Indonesia) L Natsir	21	21

Second Round
(South Korea) Shin B-c (South Korea) Chae Y-j	16	18
5	(Denmark) J Fischer Nielsen (Denmark) C Pedersen	21	21
(China) Wang Y (China) Tang JH	9	21	21
4	(South Korea) Ko S-h (South Korea) Kim H-n	21	5	10
(South Korea) Kim G-j (South Korea) Shin S-c	12	16
7	(England) C Adcock (England) G Adcock	21	21
(Indonesia) E Subaktiar (Indonesia) G E Widjaja	17	18
2	(Indonesia) T Ahmad (Indonesia) L Natsir	21	21

Quarterfinals
5	(Denmark) J Fischer Nielsen (Denmark) C Pedersen	25	21
(China) Wang Y (China) Tang JH	23	17
7	(England) C Adcock (England) G Adcock	21	21
2	(Indonesia) T Ahmad (Indonesia) L Natsir	18	16

Semifinals
5	(Denmark) J Fischer Nielsen (Denmark) C Pedersen	21	22
7	(England) C Adcock (England) G Adcock	13	20

=== Finals ===
Semifinals
1	(China) Zhang Nan (China) Zhao Yunlei	19	16
8	(Indonesia) Praveen Jordan (Indonesia) Debby Susanto	21	21
5	(Denmark) Joachim Fischer Nielsen (Denmark) Christinna Pedersen	21	22
7	(England) Chris Adcock (England) Gabrielle Adcock	13	20

Final
8	(Indonesia) Praveen Jordan (Indonesia) Debby Susanto	21	21
5	(Denmark) Joachim Fischer Nielsen (Denmark) Christinna Pedersen	12	17

Preceded by 2015 All England Super Series Premier	All England Open Badminton Championships	Succeeded by 2017 All England Super Series Premier
Preceded by 2015 BWF Super Series Masters Finals	BWF Super Series; 2016 BWF Season	Succeeded by 2016 India Super Series
