= 2017 Indonesia Super Series Premier =

Tournament details
- Dates: 12–18 June 2017
- Edition: 36th
- Level: Super Series Premier
- Total prize money: US$1,000,000
- Venue: Jakarta Convention Center
- Location: Jakarta, Indonesia

Champions
- Men's singles: (India) Srikanth Kidambi
- Women's singles: (Japan) Sayaka Sato
- Men's doubles: (China) Li Junhui (China) Liu Yuchen
- Women's doubles: (China) Chen Qingchen (China) Jia Yifan
- Mixed doubles: (Indonesia) Tontowi Ahmad (Indonesia) Liliyana Natsir

The 2017 Indonesia Super Series Premier was the fifth Super Series tournament of the 2017 BWF Super Series. The tournament took place in Jakarta, Indonesia from 12–18 June 2017 with a total purse of $1,000,000.

== Venue ==
This tournament was held at the Jakarta Convention Center Plenary Hall because the Istora Gelora Bung Karno was being renovated for the 2018 Asian Games.

== Men's singles ==
=== Seeds ===
1. (Malaysia) Lee Chong Wei (second round)
2. (South Korea) Son Wan-ho (semifinals)
3. (Denmark) Viktor Axelsen (first round)
4. (Denmark) Jan Ø. Jørgensen (second round)
5. (China) Shi Yuqi (second round)
6. (Chinese Taipei) Chou Tien-chen (quarterfinals)
7. (China) Lin Dan (first round)
8. (China) Chen Long (quarterfinals)

=== Top half ===
First Round
1 | (Malaysia) Lee C W | 13 | 21 | 21
(Indonesia) T Sugiarto | 21 | 10 | 18
(Indonesia) A S Ginting | 13 | 18
PFQ | (India) H. S. Prannoy | 21 | 21
8 | (China) Chen L | 21 | 21
(Germany) M Zwiebler | 14 | 14
PFQ | (Chinese Taipei) Hsu J-h | 17 | 15
(Indonesia) J Christie | 21 | 21
3 | (Denmark) V Axelsen | 12 | 21 | 17
Q3 | (Denmark) E Holst | 21 | 12 | 21
Q4 | (Malaysia) Chong W F | 18 | 8
Q2 | (Japan) K Sakai | 21 | 21
5 | (China) Shi YQ | 21 | 21
(South Korea) Lee H-i | 18 | 12
(Thailand) T Saensomboonsuk | 13 | 21 | 23
(England) R Ouseph | 21 | 12 | 25

Second Round
1 | (Malaysia) Lee C W | 10 | 18
PFQ | (India) H. S. Prannoy | 21 | 21
8 | (China) Chen L | 21 | 21
(Indonesia) J Christie | 9 | 7
Q3 | (Denmark) E Holst | 24 | 14
Q2 | (Japan) K Sakai | 26 | 21
5 | (China) Shi YQ | 12 | 15
(England) R Ouseph | 21 | 21

Quarterfinals
PFQ | (India) H. S. Prannoy | 21 | 16 | 21
8 | (China) Chen L | 18 | 21 | 19
Q2 | (Japan) K Sakai | 13 | 21 | 21
(England) R Ouseph | 21 | 16 | 10

Semifinals
PFQ | (India) H. S. Prannoy | 21 | 26 | 18
Q2 | (Japan) K Sakai | 17 | 28 | 21

=== Bottom half ===
First Round
(China) Tian HW | 14 | 21 | 19
(Hong Kong) Ng K L | 21 | 10 | 21
(Chinese Taipei) Wang T-w | 21 | 21
7 | (China) Lin D | 16 | 18
(India) S Kidambi | 21 | 17 | 21
(Hong Kong) Wong W K | 15 | 21 | 16
PFQ | (France) B Leverdez | 16 | 18
4 | (Denmark) J Ø. Jørgensen | 21 | 21
(Hong Kong) Hu Y | 10 | 19
(Denmark) A Antonsen | 21 | 21
(Denmark) H-K Vittinghus | 19 | 12
6 | (Chinese Taipei) Chou T-c | 21 | 21
Q1 | (China) Zhao JP | 21 | 21
(China) Huang YX | 15 | 19
(India) B. S Praneeth | 14 | 18
2 | (South Korea) Son W-h | 21 | 21

Second Round
(Hong Kong) Ng K L | 16 | 18
(Chinese Taipei) Wang T-w | 21 | 21
(India) S Kidambi | 21 | 20 | 21
4 | (Denmark) J Ø. Jørgensen | 15 | 22 | 16
(Denmark) A Antonsen | 12 | 22 | 15
6 | (Chinese Taipei) Chou T-c | 21 | 20 | 21
Q1 | (China) Zhao JP | 22 | 7 | 16
2 | (South Korea) Son W-h | 20 | 21 | 21

Quarterfinals
(Chinese Taipei) Wang T-w | 15 | 14
(India) S Kidambi | 21 | 21
6 | (Chinese Taipei) Chou T-c | 15 | 17
2 | (South Korea) Son W-h | 21 | 21

Semifinals
(India) S Kidambi | 21 | 14 | 24
2 | (South Korea) Son W-h | 15 | 21 | 22

=== Finals ===
Semifinals
PFQ | (India) H. S. Prannoy | 21 | 26 | 18
Q2 | (Japan) Kazumasa Sakai | 17 | 28 | 21
(India) Srikanth Kidambi | 21 | 14 | 24
2 | (South Korea) Son Wan-ho | 15 | 21 | 22

Final
Q2 | (Japan) Kazumasa Sakai | 11 | 19
(India) Srikanth Kidambi | 21 | 21

== Women's singles ==
=== Seeds ===
1. (Chinese Taipei) Tai Tzu-ying (quarterfinals)
2. (Spain) Carolina Marín (first round)
3. (Japan) Akane Yamaguchi (quarterfinals)
4. (India) P. V. Sindhu (second round)
5. (South Korea) Sung Ji-hyun (final)
6. (China) Sun Yu (quarterfinals)
7. (China) He Bingjiao (first round)
8. (Thailand) Ratchanok Intanon (first round)

=== Top half ===
First Round
1 | (Chinese Taipei) Tai T-y | 21 | 21
(Japan) M Mitani | 8 | 12
(China) Chen YF | 21 | 19 | 19
Q2 | (Indonesia) G M Tunjung | 17 | 21 | 21
8 | (Thailand) R Intanon | 21 | 18 | 12
(India) S Nehwal | 17 | 21 | 21
(South Korea) Kim H-m | 16 | 14
(Thailand) N Jindapol | 21 | 21
3 | (Japan) A Yamaguchi | 21 | 21
Q1 | (South Korea) Lee J-m | 15 | 19
Q3 | (Canada) M Li | 12 | 13
(Japan) N Okuhara | 21 | 21
7 | (China) He BJ | 17 | 18
(Japan) S Sato | 21 | 21
(Malaysia) Goh J W | 22 | 19
(Chinese Taipei) Lee C-h | 24 | 21

Second Round
1 | (Chinese Taipei) Tai T-y | 21 | 21
Q2 | (Indonesia) G M Tunjung | 13 | 16
(India) S Nehwal | 15 | 21 | 16
(Thailand) N Jindapol | 21 | 6 | 21
3 | (Japan) A Yamaguchi | 15 | 21 | 21
(Japan) N Okuhara | 21 | 19 | 15
(Japan) S Sato | 21 | 16 | 21
(Chinese Taipei) Lee C-h | 14 | 21 | 12

Quarterfinals
1 | (Chinese Taipei) Tai T-y | 19 | 21 | 17
(Thailand) N Jindapol | 21 | 8 | 21
3 | (Japan) A Yamaguchi | 17 | 21 | 18
(Japan) S Sato | 21 | 18 | 21

Semifinals
(Thailand) N Jindapol | 21 | 18 | 14
(Japan) S Sato | 13 | 21 | 21

=== Bottom half ===
First Round
(Thailand) B Ongbumrungpan | 21 | 21
Q4 | (Denmark) N K Rohde | 8 | 8
(Hong Kong) Yip P Y | 10 | 0^{r}
6 | (China) Sun Y | 21 | 7
(Indonesia) H Ramadini | 15 | 15
(United States) B Zhang | 21 | 21
(Thailand) P Chochuwong | 12 | 19
4 | (India) P. V. Sindhu | 21 | 21
(Hong Kong) Cheung N Y | 16 | 21 | 15
(Indonesia) Fitriani | 21 | 16 | 21
(Indonesia) D D Ayustine | 18 | 10
5 | (South Korea) Sung J-h | 21 | 21
(Malaysia) Soniia Cheah S Y | 21 | 21
(Chinese Taipei) Chiang M-h | 18 | 11
(China) Chen XX | 21 | 10 | 22
2 | (Spain) C Marín | 12 | 21 | 20

Second Round
(Thailand) B Ongbumrungpan | 19 | 19
6 | (China) Sun Y | 21 | 21
(United States) B Zhang | 15 | 21 | 21
4 | (India) P. V. Sindhu | 21 | 12 | 18
(Indonesia) Fitriani | 10 | 10
5 | (South Korea) Sung J-h | 21 | 21
(Malaysia) Soniia Cheah S Y | 21 | 18 | 11
(China) Chen XX | 12 | 21 | 21

Quarterfinals
6 | (China) Sun Y | 15 | 19
(United States) B Zhang | 21 | 21
5 | (South Korea) Sung J-h | 21 | 21 | 21
(China) Chen XX | 6 | 23 | 14

Semifinals
(United States) B Zhang | 10 | 21 | 10
5 | (South Korea) Sung J-h | 21 | 8 | 21

=== Finals ===
Semifinals
(Thailand) Nitchaon Jindapol | 21 | 18 | 14
(Japan) Sayaka Sato | 13 | 21 | 21
(United States) Beiwen Zhang | 10 | 21 | 10
5 | (South Korea) Sung Ji-hyun | 21 | 8 | 21

Final
(Japan) Sayaka Sato | 21 | 17 | 21
5 | (South Korea) Sung Ji-hyun | 13 | 21 | 14

== Men's doubles ==
=== Seeds ===
1. (Indonesia) Marcus Fernaldi Gideon / Kevin Sanjaya Sukamuljo (first round)
2. (Denmark) Mathias Boe / Carsten Mogensen (final)
3. (China) Li Junhui / Liu Yuchen (champion)
4. (Malaysia) Goh V Shem / Tan Wee Kiong (withdrew)
5. (China) Chai Biao / Hong Wei (second round)
6. (Japan) Takeshi Kamura / Keigo Sonoda (quarterfinals)
7. (Denmark) Mads Conrad-Petersen / Mads Pieler Kolding (first round)
8. (Indonesia) Ricky Karanda Suwardi / Angga Pratama (second round)

=== Top half ===
First Round
1 | (Indonesia) M F Gideon (Indonesia) K S Sukamuljo | 16 | 16
(Denmark) K Astrup (Denmark) A S Rasmussen | 21 | 21
(China) Liu C (China) Zhang N | 21 | 21
(Malaysia) Ong Y S (Malaysia) Teo E Y | 17 | 12
6 | (Japan) T Kamura (Japan) K Sonoda | 21 | 14
(Chinese Taipei) Chen H-l (Chinese Taipei) Wang C-l | 18 | 10^{r}
(Japan) T Hoki (Japan) Y Kobayashi | 16 | 13
(Denmark) M Christiansen (Denmark) D Daugaard | 21 | 21
3 | (China) Li JH (China) Liu YC | 21 | 21
(Hong Kong) Or C C (Hong Kong) Tang C M | 18 | 13
PFQ | (Japan) H Endo (Japan) Y Watanabe | 21 | 24 | 21
Q3 | (Indonesia) H Setiawan (Malaysia) Tan B H | 10 | 26 | 23
5 | (China) Chai B (China) Hong W | 21 | 15 | 21
(Singapore) D B Chrisnanta (Singapore) H Wijaya | 18 | 21 | 12
(Chinese Taipei) Lee J-h (Chinese Taipei) Lee Y | 21 | 21
(Hong Kong) Law C H (Hong Kong) Lee C H | 16 | 12

Second Round
(Denmark) K Astrup (Denmark) A S Rasmussen | 14 | 16
(China) Liu C (China) Zhang N | 21 | 21
6 | (Japan) T Kamura (Japan) K Sonoda | 21 | 21
(Denmark) M Christiansen (Denmark) D Daugaard | 17 | 16
3 | (China) Li JH (China) Liu YC | 21 | 21
Q3 | (Indonesia) H Setiawan (Malaysia) Tan B H | 15 | 15
5 | (China) Chai B (China) Hong W | 17 | 21 | 19
(Chinese Taipei) Lee J-h (Chinese Taipei) Lee Y | 21 | 17 | 21

Quarterfinals
(China) Liu C (China) Zhang N | 21 | 21
6 | (Japan) T Kamura (Japan) K Sonoda | 15 | 15
3 | (China) Li JH (China) Liu YC | 21 | 21
(Chinese Taipei) Lee J-h (Chinese Taipei) Lee Y | 12 | 13

Semifinals
(China) Liu C (China) Zhang N | 17 | 21 | 18
3 | (China) Li JH (China) Liu YC | 21 | 18 | 21

=== Bottom half ===
First Round
(Indonesia) F Alfian (Indonesia) M R Ardianto | 21 | 21
Q4 | (India) S Rankireddy (India) C Shetty | 9 | 19
Q2 | (Indonesia) A B Cahyono (Indonesia) G D Oktavan | 17 | 18
8 | (Indonesia) R K Suwardi (Indonesia) A Pratama | 21 | 21
(Indonesia) H A Gunawan (Indonesia) M Kido | w | / | o
(China) Lu K (China) Zheng SW
(Thailand) K Kedren (Thailand) D Puavaranukroh | 21 | 17 | 21
PFQ | (Indonesia) M Ahsan (Indonesia) R A Saputro | 19 | 21 | 18
PFQ | (Malaysia) Goh S F (Malaysia) N Izzuddin | 14 | 16
(Chinese Taipei) Lu C-y (Chinese Taipei) Yang P-h | 21 | 21
(Russia) V Ivanov (Russia) I Sozonov | 21 | 10 | 22
7 | (Denmark) M Conrad-Petersen (Denmark) M Pieler Kolding | 16 | 21 | 20
(Thailand) B Isara (Thailand) N Phuangphuapet | 21 | 21
Q1 | (Indonesia) C Kristanto (Indonesia) B Maulana | 13 | 12
(Indonesia) B Angriawan (Indonesia) Hardianto | 18 | 23 | 15
2 | (Denmark) M Boe (Denmark) C Mogensen | 21 | 21 | 21

Second Round
(Indonesia) F Alfian (Indonesia) M R Ardianto | 21 | 17 | 21
8 | (Indonesia) R K Suwardi (Indonesia) A Pratama | 17 | 21 | 15
(Indonesia) H A Gunawan (Indonesia) M Kido | 12 | 8
(Thailand) K Kedren (Thailand) D Puavaranukroh | 21 | 21
(Chinese Taipei) Lu C-y (Chinese Taipei) Yang P-h | 18 | 16
(Russia) V Ivanov (Russia) I Sozonov | 21 | 21
(Thailand) B Isara (Thailand) N Phuangphuapet | 22 | 21 | 13
2 | (Denmark) M Boe (Denmark) C Mogensen | 24 | 19 | 21

Quarterfinals
(Indonesia) F Alfian (Indonesia) M R Ardianto | 21 | 18 | 21
(Thailand) K Kedren (Thailand) D Puavaranukroh | 13 | 21 | 12
(Russia) V Ivanov (Russia) I Sozonov | 21 | 11
2 | (Denmark) M Boe (Denmark) C Mogensen | 23 | 21

Semifinals
(Indonesia) F Alfian (Indonesia) M R Ardianto | 17 | 21 | 12
2 | (Denmark) M Boe (Denmark) C Mogensen | 21 | 18 | 21

=== Finals ===
Semifinals
(China) Liu Cheng (China) Zhang Nan | 17 | 21 | 18
3 | (China) Li Junhui (China) Liu Yuchen | 21 | 18 | 21
(Indonesia) Fajar Alfian (Indonesia) Muhammad Rian Ardianto | 17 | 21 | 12
2 | (Denmark) Mathias Boe (Denmark) Carsten Mogensen | 21 | 18 | 21

Final
3 | (China) Li Junhui (China) Liu Yuchen | 21 | 19 | 21
2 | (Denmark) Mathias Boe (Denmark) Carsten Mogensen | 19 | 21 | 18

== Women's doubles ==
=== Seeds ===
1. (Japan) Misaki Matsutomo / Ayaka Takahashi (first round)
2. (Denmark) Kamilla Rytter Juhl / Christinna Pedersen (quarterfinals)
3. (South Korea) Chang Ye-na / Lee So-hee (final)
4. (South Korea) Jung Kyung-eun / Shin Seung-chan (second round)
5. (China) Chen Qingchen / Jia Yifan (champion)
6. (China) Luo Ying / Luo Yu (second round)
7. (China) Huang Dongping / Li Yinhui (first round)
8. (Japan) Shiho Tanaka / Koharu Yonemoto (semifinals)

=== Top half ===
First Round
1 | (Japan) M Matsutomo (Japan) A Takahashi | 7 | 20
(China) Huang YQ (China) Yu XH | 21 | 22
(Japan) Y Fukushima (Japan) S Hirota | 21 | 21
Q4 | (Indonesia) S Kani (Indonesia) J F Sugiarto | 10 | 14
8 | (Japan) S Tanaka (Japan) K Yonemoto | 21 | 14 | 21
(Malaysia) Lim Y L (Malaysia) Yap C W | 18 | 21 | 12
(Japan) N Fukuman (Japan) K Yonao | 21 | 21
(Indonesia) K N Hanadia (Indonesia) D T Permatasari | 10 | 14
3 | (South Korea) Chang Y-n (South Korea) Lee S-h | 21 | 21
(Denmark) M Fruergaard (Denmark) S Thygesen | 14 | 13
(Indonesia) G Polii (Indonesia) A Rahayu | 15 | 25 | 21
(South Korea) Chae Y-j (South Korea) Kim S-y | 21 | 23 | 14
6 | (China) Luo Y (China) Luo Y | 13 | 21 | 21
Q1 | (Indonesia) A Imanuela (Indonesia) S F S Ramadhanti | 21 | 10 | 19
(Australia) S Mapasa (Australia) G Somerville | 11 | 13
(Indonesia) D D Haris (Indonesia) R E Putri Sari | 21 | 21

Second Round
(China) Huang YQ (China) Yu XH | 21 | 16 | 15
(Japan) Y Fukushima (Japan) S Hirota | 19 | 21 | 21
8 | (Japan) S Tanaka (Japan) K Yonemoto | 21 | 21
(Japan) N Fukuman (Japan) K Yonao | 9 | 16
3 | (South Korea) Chang Y-n (South Korea) Lee S-h | 21 | 21
(Indonesia) G Polii (Indonesia) A Rahayu | 18 | 14
6 | (China) Luo Y (China) Luo Y | 22 | 14 | 14
(Indonesia) D D Haris (Indonesia) R E Putri Sari | 20 | 21 | 21

Quarterfinals
(Japan) Y Fukushima (Japan) S Hirota | 21 | 14 | 14
8 | (Japan) S Tanaka (Japan) K Yonemoto | 19 | 21 | 21
3 | (South Korea) Chang Y-n (South Korea) Lee S-h | 17 | 21 | 21
(Indonesia) D D Haris (Indonesia) R E Putri Sari | 21 | 13 | 13

Semifinals
8 | (Japan) S Tanaka (Japan) K Yonemoto | 14 | 21 | 11
3 | (South Korea) Chang Y-n (South Korea) Lee S-h | 21 | 12 | 21

=== Bottom half ===
First Round
(Thailand) P Supajirakul (Thailand) S Taerattanachai | 21 | 21
(Indonesia) T R Nuraidah (Indonesia) R A Pradipta | 16 | 15
(Chinese Taipei) Hsu Y-c (Chinese Taipei) Wu T-j | w | / | o
7 | (China) Huang DP (China) Li YH
Q3 | (Indonesia) Y Barkah (Indonesia) M C Sahputri | 21 | 21 | 15
(Indonesia) A S Awanda (Indonesia) N K M Istirani | 23 | 18 | 21
(China) Bao YX (China) Tang JH | 21 | 13
4 | (South Korea) Jung K-e (South Korea) Shin S-c | 23 | 21
Q2 | (Indonesia) D Fitriani (Indonesia) N Melati | 19 | 21 | 21
(India) A Ponnappa (India) N. S Reddy | 21 | 19 | 13
(Malaysia) Chow M K (Malaysia) Lee M Y | 20 | 21 | 14
5 | (China) Chen QC (China) Jia YF | 22 | 13 | 21
PFQ | (Hong Kong) Poon L Y (Hong Kong) Tse Y S | 21 | 21
(Malaysia) Vivian Hoo K M (Malaysia) Woon K W | 9 | 12
(South Korea) Kim H-r (South Korea) Yoo H-w | 16 | 8
2 | (Denmark) K Rytter Juhl (Denmark) C Pedersen | 21 | 21

Second Round
(Thailand) P Supajirakul (Thailand) S Taerattanachai | 21 | 21
(Chinese Taipei) Hsu Y-c (Chinese Taipei) Wu T-j | 13 | 13
(Indonesia) A S Awanda (Indonesia) N K M Istirani | 21 | 12 | 21
4 | (South Korea) Jung K-e (South Korea) Shin S-c | 15 | 21 | 15
Q2 | (Indonesia) D Fitriani (Indonesia) N Melati | 15 | 12
5 | (China) Chen QC (China) Jia YF | 21 | 21
PFQ | (Hong Kong) Poon L Y (Hong Kong) Tse Y S | 15 | 11
2 | (Denmark) K Rytter Juhl (Denmark) C Pedersen | 21 | 21

Quarterfinals
(Thailand) P Supajirakul (Thailand) S Taerattanachai | 21 | 19 | 11
(Indonesia) A S Awanda (Indonesia) N K M Istirani | 13 | 21 | 21
5 | (China) Chen QC (China) Jia YF | 18 | 21 | 21
2 | (Denmark) K Rytter Juhl (Denmark) C Pedersen | 21 | 17 | 11

Semifinals
(Indonesia) A S Awanda (Indonesia) N K M Istirani | 12 | 17
5 | (China) Chen QC (China) Jia YF | 21 | 21

=== Finals ===
Semifinals
8 | (Japan) Shiho Tanaka (Japan) Koharu Yonemoto | 14 | 21 | 11
3 | (South Korea) Chang Ye-na (South Korea) Lee So-hee | 21 | 12 | 21
(Indonesia) Anggia Shitta Awanda (Indonesia) Ni Ketut Mahadewi Istirani | 12 | 17
5 | (China) Chen Qingchen (China) Jia Yifan | 21 | 21

Final
3 | (South Korea) Chang Ye-na (South Korea) Lee So-hee | 19 | 21 | 10
5 | (China) Chen Qingchen (China) Jia Yifan | 21 | 15 | 21

== Mixed doubles ==
=== Seeds ===
1. (China) Zheng Siwei / Chen Qingchen (final)
2. (China) Lu Kai / Huang Yaqiong (second round)
3. (China) Zhang Nan / Li Yinhui (first round)
4. (Denmark) Joachim Fischer Nielsen / Christinna Pedersen (first round)
5. (England) Chris Adcock / Gabrielle Adcock (quarterfinals)
6. (Indonesia) Tontowi Ahmad / Liliyana Natsir (champion)
7. (Indonesia) Praveen Jordan / Debby Susanto (first round)
8. (Thailand) Dechapol Puavaranukroh / Sapsiree Taerattanachai (first round)

=== Top half ===
First Round
1 | (China) Zheng SW (China) Chen QC | 24 | 21
(South Korea) Choi S-g (South Korea) Chae Y-j | 22 | 12
(Japan) Y Watanabe (Japan) A Higashino | 21 | 13 | 21
(Indonesia) E Subaktiar (Indonesia) G E Widjaja | 18 | 21 | 17
7 | (Indonesia) P Jordan (Indonesia) D Susanto | 21 | 19 | 11
(Denmark) M Christiansen (Denmark) S Thygesen | 15 | 21 | 21
(India) B. S Reddy (India) A Ponnappa | 12 | 9
Q2 | (Indonesia) I Fadhilah (Indonesia) W Anggraini | 21 | 21
4 | (Denmark) J Fischer Nielsen (Denmark) C Pedersen | 16 | 21 | 15
(Hong Kong) Tang C M (Hong Kong) Tse Y S | 21 | 15 | 21
Q1 | (China) Liu YC (China) Tang JH | 13 | 22 | 21
(Singapore) Terry Hee Y K (Singapore) Tan W H | 21 | 20 | 8
5 | (England) C Adcock (England) G Adcock | 21 | 21
(Hong Kong) Lee C H (Hong Kong) Chau H W | 18 | 17
(Japan) K Kazuno (Japan) A Kurihara | 14 | 18
(Indonesia) A E Prasetya (Indonesia) A Saufika | 21 | 21

Second Round
1 | (China) Zheng SW (China) Chen QC | 21 | 22
(Japan) Y Watanabe (Japan) A Higashino | 14 | 20
(Denmark) M Christiansen (Denmark) S Thygesen | 21 | 21
Q2 | (Indonesia) I Fadhilah (Indonesia) W Anggraini | 13 | 15
(Hong Kong) Tang C M (Hong Kong) Tse Y S | 21 | 13 | 12
Q1 | (China) Liu YC (China) Tang JH | 14 | 21 | 21
5 | (England) C Adcock (England) G Adcock | 21 | 21
(Indonesia) A E Prasetya (Indonesia) A Saufika | 11 | 14

Quarterfinals
1 | (China) Zheng SW (China) Chen QC | 21 | 21
(Denmark) M Christiansen (Denmark) S Thygesen | 14 | 19
Q1 | (China) Liu YC (China) Tang JH | 21 | 17 | 21
5 | (England) C Adcock (England) G Adcock | 11 | 21 | 16

Semifinals
1 | (China) Zheng SW (China) Chen QC | 21 | 21 | 21
Q1 | (China) Liu YC (China) Tang JH | 10 | 23 | 16

=== Bottom half ===
First Round
(Indonesia) H Faizal (Indonesia) S D Aulia | 21 | 21
(Chinese Taipei) Wang C-l (Chinese Taipei) Lee C-h | 14 | 16
(South Korea) Kim D-y (South Korea) Kim H-n | 21 | 19 | 18
6 | (Indonesia) T Ahmad (Indonesia) L Natsir | 19 | 21 | 21
PFQ | (Chinese Taipei) Lee Y (Chinese Taipei) Hsu Y-c | 14 | 20
(Malaysia) Tan K M (Malaysia) Lai P J | 21 | 22
Q4 | (Indonesia) F Abimanyu (Indonesia) B F Romadhini | w | / | o
3 | (China) Zhang N (China) Li YH
Q3 | (Vietnam) Do T D (Vietnam) Pham N T | 21 | 16 | 7
PFQ | (Chinese Taipei) Lu C-y (Chinese Taipei) Chiang K-h | 17 | 21 | 21
(Malaysia) Goh S H (Malaysia) S J Lai | 21 | 15 | 21
8 | (Thailand) D Puavaranukroh (Thailand) S Taerattanachai | 16 | 21 | 13
(Malaysia) Chan P S (Malaysia) Peck Y W | 21 | 21
(Indonesia) R Alexander (Indonesia) M D Oktavianti | 18 | 18
(Thailand) B Isara (Thailand) S Amitrapai | 21 | 16 | 17
2 | (China) Lu K (China) Huang YQ | 15 | 21 | 21

Second Round
(Indonesia) H Faizal (Indonesia) S D Aulia | 17 | 20
6 | (Indonesia) T Ahmad (Indonesia) L Natsir | 21 | 22
(Malaysia) Tan K M (Malaysia) Lai P J | 22 | 21
Q4 | (Indonesia) F Abimanyu (Indonesia) B F Romadhini | 20 | 13
PFQ | (Chinese Taipei) Lu C-y (Chinese Taipei) Chiang K-h | 21 | 21
(Malaysia) Goh S H (Malaysia) S J Lai | 18 | 19
(Malaysia) Chan P S (Malaysia) Peck Y W | w | / | o
2 | (China) Lu K (China) Huang YQ

Quarterfinals
6 | (Indonesia) T Ahmad (Indonesia) L Natsir | 21 | 21
(Malaysia) Tan K M (Malaysia) Lai P J | 18 | 16
PFQ | (Chinese Taipei) Lu C-y (Chinese Taipei) Chiang K-h | 21 | 13 | 13
(Malaysia) Chan P S (Malaysia) Peck Y W | 19 | 21 | 21

Semifinals
6 | (Indonesia) T Ahmad (Indonesia) L Natsir | 21 | 21
(Malaysia) Chan P S (Malaysia) Peck Y W | 13 | 14

=== Finals ===
Semifinals
1 | (China) Zheng Siwei (China) Chen Qingchen | 21 | 21 | 21
Q1 | (China) Liu Yuchen (China) Tang Jinhua | 10 | 23 | 16
6 | (Indonesia) Tontowi Ahmad (Indonesia) Liliyana Natsir | 21 | 21
(Malaysia) Chan Peng Soon (Malaysia) Peck Yen Wei | 13 | 14

Final
1 | (China) Zheng Siwei (China) Chen Qingchen | 20 | 15
6 | (Indonesia) Tontowi Ahmad (Indonesia) Liliyana Natsir | 22 | 21

| Preceded by 2016 Indonesia Super Series Premier | Indonesia Open | Succeeded by 2018 Indonesia Open |
| Preceded by 2017 Singapore Super Series | BWF Super Series; 2017 BWF Season | Succeeded by 2017 Australian Super Series |
