= 2017 Australian Super Series =

2017 Australian Open Super Series

Tournament details
- Dates: 20–25 June 2017
- Level: Super Series
- Total prize money: US$750,000
- Venue: State Sports Centre
- Location: Sydney

Champions
- Men's singles: (India) Srikanth Kidambi
- Women's singles: (Japan) Nozomi Okuhara
- Men's doubles: (Japan) Takeshi Kamura (Japan) Keigo Sonoda
- Women's doubles: (Japan) Misaki Matsutomo (Japan) Ayaka Takahashi
- Mixed doubles: (China) Zheng Siwei (China) Chen Qingchen

The 2017 Australian Super Series was the sixth Super Series badminton tournament of the 2017 BWF Super Series. The tournament took place in Sydney from 20–25 June 2017 with a total purse of $750,000.

== Men's singles ==
=== Seeds ===
1. (South Korea) Son Wan-ho (second round)
2. (Malaysia) Lee Chong Wei (withdrew)
3. (Denmark) Viktor Axelsen (withdrew)
4. (China) Shi Yuqi (semi-finals)
5. (Denmark) Jan Ø. Jørgensen (first round)
6. (Chinese Taipei) Chou Tien-chen (first round)
7. (Hong Kong) Ng Ka Long (second round)
8. (China) Tian Houwei (quarter-finals)

=== Top half ===
First round
1	(South Korea) Son W-h	21	14	21
Q1	(India) P Kashyap	18	21	15
(India) S Kidambi	21	21
Q3	(Chinese Taipei) Kan C-y	13	16
6	(Chinese Taipei) Chou T-c	21	18	18
(China) Huang YX	17	21	21
(Indonesia) T Sugiarto	21	12	10
(India) B. S Praneeth	10	21	21
4	(China) Shi YQ	21	21
(Chinese Taipei) Hsu J-h	17	14
(Chinese Taipei) Wang T-w	21	19
PFQ	(Japan) K Tsuneyama	23	21
7	(Hong Kong) Ng K L	14	21	21
(India) A Jayaram	21	10	9
(Denmark) H-K Vittinghus	21	21
Q2	(India) S Verma	16	8

Second round
1	(South Korea) Son W-h	21	13	13
(India) S Kidambi	15	21	21
(China) Huang YX	15	21	13
(India) B. S Praneeth	21	18	21
4	(China) Shi YQ	21	21
PFQ	(Japan) K Tsuneyama	13	18
7	(Hong Kong) Ng K L	9	13
(Denmark) H-K Vittinghus	21	21

Quarter-finals
(India) S Kidambi	25	21
(India) B. S Praneeth	23	17
4	(China) Shi YQ	21	21
(Denmark) H-K Vittinghus	17	12

Semi-finals
(India) S Kidambi	21	21
4	(China) Shi YQ	10	14

=== Bottom half ===
First round
(China) Chen L	21	21
(Hong Kong) Wong W K	15	13
(Indonesia) A S Ginting	23	21	14
5	(Denmark) J Ø. Jørgensen	25	12	9^{r}
(Indonesia) J Christie	23	21
(Hong Kong) Hu Y	21	18
(China) Lin D	21	21
PFQ	(South Korea) Lee D-k	14	12
PFQ	(India) H. S. Prannoy	19	13
(England) R Ouseph	21	21
(Thailand) T Saensomboonsuk	19	17
8	(China) Tian HW	21	21
(Denmark) A Antonsen	21	10	19
(South Korea) Lee H-i	19	21	21
Q4	(Japan) T Ueda	18	19
PFQ	(Malaysia) Z Zulkiffli	21	21

Second round
(China) Chen L	21	21
(Indonesia) A S Ginting	10	13
(Indonesia) J Christie	14	19
(China) Lin D	21	21
(England) R Ouseph	18	21	8
8	(China) Tian HW	21	19	21
(South Korea) Lee H-i	22	21
PFQ	(Malaysia) Z Zulkiffli	20	15

Quarter-finals
(China) Chen L	21	12	23
(China) Lin D	16	21	21
8	(China) Tian HW	21	15	18
(South Korea) Lee H-i	17	21	21

Semi-finals
(China) Chen L	26	15	21
(South Korea) Lee H-i	24	21	17

=== Finals ===
Semi-finals
(India) Srikanth Kidambi	21	21
4	(China) Shi Yuqi	10	14
(China) Chen Long	26	15	21
(South Korea) Lee Hyun-il	24	21	17

Final
(India) Srikanth Kidambi	22	21
(China) Chen Long	20	16

== Women's singles ==
=== Seeds ===
1. (Chinese Taipei) Tai Tzu-ying (semi-finals)
2. (Spain) Carolina Marín (first round)
3. (Japan) Akane Yamaguchi (final)
4. (South Korea) Sung Ji-hyun (first round)
5. (India) P. V. Sindhu (quarter-finals)
6. (China) Sun Yu (semi-finals)
7. (China) He Bingjiao (second round)
8. (China) Chen Yufei (quarter-finals)

=== Top half ===
First round
1	(Chinese Taipei) Tai T-y	21	21
PFQ	(Scotland) K Gilmour	18	11
Q3	(Australia) L Ma	11	12
(Thailand) R Intanon	21	21
5	(India) P. V. Sindhu	21	14	21
(Japan) S Sato	17	21	18
(China) Chen XX	21	12	21
Q1	(India) R S Gadde	17	21	12
3	(Japan) A Yamaguchi	21	21
(Chinese Taipei) Chiang M-h	16	9
Q2	(Singapore) Yeo J M	16	21	21
Q4	(Australia) Chen H-y	21	6	18
8	(China) Chen YF	21	21
(Chinese Taipei) Lee C-h	16	8
(Denmark) N K Rohde	11	15
(Japan) A Ohori	21	21

Second round
1	(Chinese Taipei) Tai T-y	21	21
(Thailand) R Intanon	11	18
5	(India) P. V. Sindhu	21	21
(China) Chen XX	13	18
3	(Japan) A Yamaguchi	21	21
Q2	(Singapore) Yeo J M	14	15
8	(China) Chen YF	21	21
(Japan) A Ohori	19	18

Quarter-finals
1	(Chinese Taipei) Tai T-y	10	22	21
5	(India) P. V. Sindhu	21	20	16
3	(Japan) A Yamaguchi	21	21
8	(China) Chen YF	15	14

Semi-finals
1	(Chinese Taipei) Tai T-y	19	12
3	(Japan) A Yamaguchi	21	21

=== Bottom half ===
First round
(Hong Kong) Yip P Y	16	8
(South Korea) Lee J-m	21	21
PFQ	(Indonesia) L A Mainaky	6	12
6	(China) Sun Y	21	21
(Hong Kong) Cheung N Y	14	15
(Malaysia) Soniia Cheah S Y	21	21
(India) S Nehwal	21	21
4	(South Korea) Sung J-h	10	16
(Canada) M Li	17	12
PFQ	(Japan) S Takahashi	21	21
(South Korea) Kim H-m	21	16
7	(China) He BJ	23	21
(Chinese Taipei) Hsu Y-c	13	17
(Japan) M Mitani	21	21
(Japan) N Okuhara	21	21
2	(Spain) C Marín	12	19

Second round
(South Korea) Lee J-m	14	17
6	(China) Sun Y	21	21
(Malaysia) Soniia Cheah S Y	15	22	14
(India) S Nehwal	21	20	21
PFQ	(Japan) S Takahashi	21	21
7	(China) He BJ	14	17
(Japan) M Mitani	12	10
(Japan) N Okuhara	21	21

Quarter-finals
6	(China) Sun Y	21	10	21
(India) S Nehwal	17	21	17
(Japan) S Takahashi	12	21
(Japan) N Okuhara	21	23

Semi-finals
6	(China) Sun Y	18	21	14
(Japan) N Okuhara	21	18	21

=== Finals ===
Semi-finals
1	(Chinese Taipei) Tai Tzu-ying	19	12
3	(Japan) Akane Yamaguchi	21	21
6	(China) Sun Yu	18	21	14
(Japan) Nozomi Okuhara	21	18	21

Final
3	(Japan) Akane Yamaguchi	12	23	17
(Japan) Nozomi Okuhara	21	21	21

== Men's doubles ==
=== Seeds ===
1. (Indonesia) Marcus Fernaldi Gideon / Kevin Sanjaya Sukamuljo (withdrew)
2. (China) Li Junhui / Liu Yuchen (second round)
3. (Japan) Takeshi Kamura / Keigo Sonoda (champion)
4. (Malaysia) Goh V Shem / Tan Wee Kiong (first round)
5. (Indonesia) Ricky Karanda Suwardi / Angga Pratama (first round)
6. (Chinese Taipei) Lee Jhe-huei / Lee Yang (second round)
7. (China) Huang Kaixiang / Wang Yilu (second round)
8. (Chinese Taipei) Chen Hung-ling / Wang Chi-lin (quarter-finals)

=== Top half ===
First round
PFQ	(Australia) Simon Leung W H (Australia) M Wheller	6	11
(Malaysia) Ong Y S (Malaysia) Teo E Y	21	21
Q2	(Indonesia) S Alvindo (Indonesia) F S Surbakti	21	20	21
Q4	(Australia) R Tam (Australia) E Vuong	17	22	13
7	(China) Huang KX (China) Wang YL	21	19	21
(Indonesia) F Alfian (Indonesia) M R Ardianto	10	21	16
(China) Liu C (China) Zhang N	21	20	23
(Hong Kong) Or C C (Hong Kong) Tang C M	18	22	21
4	(Malaysia) Goh V S (Malaysia) Tan W K	21	13	13
(Japan) T Inoue (Japan) Y Kaneko	16	21	21
Q1	(Australia) J Schueler (Australia) N Tang	19	14
PFQ	(Australia) C Chen (Australia) H Tang	21	21
6	(Chinese Taipei) Lee J-h (Chinese Taipei) Lee Y	21	21
(England) P Briggs (England) T Wolfenden	17	15
(India) A Francis (India) T Kona	17	15
(Indonesia) H Setiawan (Malaysia) Tan B H	21	21

Second round
(Malaysia) Ong Y S (Malaysia) Teo E Y	21	21
Q2	(Indonesia) S Alvindo (Indonesia) F S Surbakti	9	7
7	(China) Huang KX (China) Wang YL	16	14
(China) Liu C (China) Zhang N	21	21
(Japan) T Inoue (Japan) Y Kaneko	21	21
PFQ	(Australia) C Chen (Australia) H Tang	8	10
6	(Chinese Taipei) Lee J-h (Chinese Taipei) Lee Y	17	11
(Indonesia) H Setiawan (Malaysia) Tan B H	21	21

Quarter-finals
(Malaysia) Ong Y S (Malaysia) Teo E Y	21	12	15
(China) Liu C (China) Zhang N	14	21	21
(Japan) T Inoue (Japan) Y Kaneko	14	12
(Indonesia) H Setiawan (Malaysia) Tan B H	21	21

Semi-finals
(China) Liu C (China) Zhang N	15	21	17
(Indonesia) H Setiawan (Malaysia) Tan B H	21	14	21

=== Bottom half ===
First round
(India) S Rankireddy (India) C Shetty	20	21	21
(Hong Kong) Law C H (Hong Kong) Lee C H	22	19	11
(Australia) M Chau (Australia) S Serasinghe	7	15
8	(Chinese Taipei) Chen H-l (Chinese Taipei) Wang C-l	21	21
(Japan) T Hoki (Japan) Y Kobayashi	21	21
PFQ	(Thailand) S Jomkoh (Thailand) P Kuna-Anuvit	16	14
(India) M Attri (India) B. S Reddy	20	6
3	(Japan) T Kamura (Japan) K Sonoda	22	21
Q3	(Australia) S Aroliveettil (Australia) J Sun	7	4
PFQ	(South Korea) Choi S-g (South Korea) Kim D-y	21	21
(Japan) H Endo (Japan) Y Watanabe	13	21	21
5	(Indonesia) R K Suwardi (Indonesia) A Pratama	21	17	19
(Chinese Taipei) Lu C-y (Chinese Taipei) Yang P-h	21	21
(Malaysia) Goh S F (Malaysia) N Izzuddin	13	11
(Denmark) M Christiansen (Denmark) D Daugaard	18	21
2	(China) Li JH (China) Liu YC	21	23

Second round
(India) S Rankireddy (India) C Shetty	16	18
8	(Chinese Taipei) Chen H-l (Chinese Taipei) Wang C-l	21	21
(Japan) T Hoki (Japan) Y Kobayashi	17	8
3	(Japan) T Kamura (Japan) K Sonoda	21	21
PFQ	(South Korea) Choi S-g (South Korea) Kim D-y	21	11	22
(Japan) H Endo (Japan) Y Watanabe	15	21	20
(Chinese Taipei) Lu C-y (Chinese Taipei) Yang P-h	21	15	21
2	(China) Li JH (China) Liu YC	15	21	17

Quarter-finals
8	(Chinese Taipei) Chen H-l (Chinese Taipei) Wang C-l	18	19
3	(Japan) T Kamura (Japan) K Sonoda	21	21
PFQ	(South Korea) Choi S-g (South Korea) Kim D-y	16	18
(Chinese Taipei) Lu C-y (Chinese Taipei) Yang P-h	21	21

Semi-finals
3	(Japan) T Kamura (Japan) K Sonoda	21	21
(Chinese Taipei) Lu C-y (Chinese Taipei) Yang P-h	15	15

=== Finals ===
Semi-finals
(China) Liu Cheng (China) Zhang Nan	15	21	17
(Indonesia) Hendra Setiawan (Malaysia) Tan Boon Heong	21	14	21
3	(Japan) Takeshi Kamura (Japan) Keigo Sonoda	21	21
(Chinese Taipei) Lu Ching-yao (Chinese Taipei) Yang Po-han	15	15

Final
(Indonesia) Hendra Setiawan (Malaysia) Tan Boon Heong	17	19
3	(Japan) Takeshi Kamura (Japan) Keigo Sonoda	21	21

== Women's doubles ==
=== Seeds ===
1. (Japan) Misaki Matsutomo / Ayaka Takahashi (champion)
2. (Denmark) Kamilla Rytter Juhl / Christinna Pedersen (final)
3. (South Korea) Chang Ye-na / Lee So-hee (quarter-finals)
4. (China) Chen Qingchen / Jia Yifan (semi-finals)
5. (South Korea) Jung Kyung-eun / Shin Seung-chan (first round)
6. (China) Huang Dongping / Li Yinhui (withdrew)
7. (Japan) Shiho Tanaka / Koharu Yonemoto (quarter-finals)
8. (Japan) Naoko Fukuman / Kurumi Yonao (second round)

=== Top half ===
First round
(Hong Kong) Poon L Y (Hong Kong) Tse Y S	21	21
(Australia) S Mapasa (Australia) G Somerville	19	19
7	(Japan) S Tanaka (Japan) K Yonemoto	21	21
(Australia) T Ho (Australia) S Kurniawan	9	5
(Australia) Chen H-y (Australia) J Tam	11	13
(India) A Ponnappa (India) N. S Reddy	21	21
(Thailand) J Kititharakul (Thailand) R Prajongjai
(Australia) Celeste Lee (Australia) Chloe Lee	w	/	o
5	(South Korea) Jung K-e (South Korea) Shin S-c	17	18
(China) Bao YX (China) Tang JH	21	21
(China) Huang YQ (China) Yu XH	w	/	o
(Indonesia) R S Putri (Indonesia) D R Vehrenica

Second round
1	(Japan) M Matsutomo (Japan) A Takahashi	21	21
(Hong Kong) Poon L Y (Hong Kong) Tse Y S	9	15
7	(Japan) S Tanaka (Japan) K Yonemoto	18	21	21
(India) A Ponnappa (India) N. S Reddy	21	18	13
4	(China) Chen QC (China) Jia YF	21	21
(Australia) Celeste Lee (Australia) Chloe Lee	6	7
(China) Bao YX (China) Tang JH	23	21
(China) Huang YQ (China) Yu XH	21	18

Quarter-finals
1	(Japan) M Matsutomo (Japan) A Takahashi	21	18	21
7	(Japan) S Tanaka (Japan) K Yonemoto	16	21	16
4	(China) Chen QC (China) Jia YF	21	20	21
(China) Bao YX (China) Tang JH	17	22	18

Semi-finals
1	(Japan) M Matsutomo (Japan) A Takahashi	21	21
4	(China) Chen QC (China) Jia YF	17	11

=== Bottom half ===
First round
(Japan) A Higashino (Japan) A Kurihara	w	/	o
(Malaysia) Vivian Hoo K M (Malaysia) Woon K W
(Japan) Y Fukushima (Japan) S Hirota	w	/	o
6	(China) Huang DP (China) Li YH
(Chinese Taipei) Hsu Y-c (Chinese Taipei) Wu T-j	21	25
(Australia) Elena Kwok Y M (Australia) L Ma	8	23
(South Korea) Kim H-r (South Korea) Yoo H-w	21	21
(Denmark) M Fruergaard (Denmark) S Thygesen	16	7
(Thailand) P Supajirakul (Thailand) S Taerattanachai	16	16
8	(Japan) N Fukuman (Japan) K Yonao	21	21
(Chinese Taipei) Chiang K-h (Chinese Taipei) Hung S-h	18	20
(South Korea) Chae Y-j (South Korea) Kim S-y	21	22

Second round
(Japan) A Higashino (Japan) A Kurihara	16	9
(Japan) Y Fukushima (Japan) S Hirota	21	21
(Chinese Taipei) Hsu Y-c (Chinese Taipei) Wu T-j	10	11
3	(South Korea) Chang Y-n (South Korea) Lee S-h	21	21
(South Korea) Kim H-r (South Korea) Yoo H-w	21	21
8	(Japan) N Fukuman (Japan) K Yonao	6	10
(South Korea) Chae Y-j (South Korea) Kim S-y	15	11
2	(Denmark) K Rytter Juhl (Denmark) C Pedersen	21	21

Quarter-finals
(Japan) Y Fukushima (Japan) S Hirota	10	26	21
3	(South Korea) Chang Y-n (South Korea) Lee S-h	21	24	16
(South Korea) Kim H-r (South Korea) Yoo H-w	11	21	21
2	(Denmark) K Rytter Juhl (Denmark) C Pedersen	21	15	23

Semi-finals
(Japan) Y Fukushima (Japan) S Hirota	16	22	18
2	(Denmark) K Rytter Juhl (Denmark) C Pedersen	21	20	21

=== Finals ===
Semi-finals
1	(Japan) Misaki Matsutomo (Japan) Ayaka Takahashi	21	21
4	(China) Chen Qingchen (China) Jia Yifan	17	11
(Japan) Yuki Fukushima (Japan) Sayaka Hirota	16	22	18
2	(Denmark) Kamilla Rytter Juhl (Denmark) Christinna Pedersen	21	20	21

Final
1	(Japan) Misaki Matsutomo (Japan) Ayaka Takahashi	21	21
2	(Denmark) Kamilla Rytter Juhl (Denmark) Christinna Pedersen	10	13

== Mixed doubles ==
=== Seeds ===
1. (China) Zheng Siwei / Chen Qingchen (champion)
2. (China) Lu Kai / Huang Yaqiong (withdrew)
3. (China) Zhang Nan / Li Yinhui (withdrew)
4. (Denmark) Joachim Fischer Nielsen / Christinna Pedersen (first round)
5. (England) Chris Adcock / Gabrielle Adcock (quarter-finals)
6. (Indonesia) Tontowi Ahmad / Liliyana Natsir (first round)
7. (Indonesia) Praveen Jordan / Debby Susanto (final)
8. (Thailand) Dechapol Puavaranukroh / Sapsiree Taerattanachai (quarter-finals)

=== Top half ===
First round
1	(China) Zheng SW (China) Chen QC	21	21
(Denmark) M Christiansen (Denmark) S Thygesen	18	16
Q4	(Australia) M Fariman (Australia) S Kurniawan	10	15
(Chinese Taipei) Lu C-y (Chinese Taipei) Chiang K-h	21	21
6	(Indonesia) T Ahmad (Indonesia) L Natsir	17	16
(Malaysia) Tan K M (Malaysia) Lai P J	21	21
Q2	(Australia) Hugo Lueng W C (Australia) Chim H K	17	14
(Japan) Y Kobayashi (Japan) M Matsutomo	21	21
4	(Denmark) J Fischer Nielsen (Denmark) C Pedersen	19	15
(China) Wang YL (China) Huang DP	21	21
(Australia) S Serasinghe (Australia) S Mapasa	15	22
(Japan) K Kazuno (Japan) A Kurihara	21	24
5	(England) C Adcock (England) G Adcock	21	21
PFQ	(Australia) Simon Leung W H (Australia) T Ho	15	13
(Chinese Taipei) Lee Y (Chinese Taipei) Hsu Y-c	15	14
(South Korea) Choi S-g (South Korea) Chae Y-j	21	21

Second round
1	(China) Zheng SW (China) Chen QC	21	21
(Chinese Taipei) Lu C-y (Chinese Taipei) Chiang K-h	10	15
(Malaysia) Tan K M (Malaysia) Lai P J	16	21
(Japan) Y Kobayashi (Japan) M Matsutomo	21	23
(China) Wang YL (China) Huang DP	21	23
(Japan) K Kazuno (Japan) A Kurihara	10	21
5	(England) C Adcock (England) G Adcock	21	17	21
(South Korea) Choi S-g (South Korea) Chae Y-j	14	21	18

Quarter-finals
1	(China) Zheng SW (China) Chen QC	21	21
(Japan) Y Kobayashi (Japan) M Matsutomo	19	13
(China) Wang YL (China) Huang DP	22	21
5	(England) C Adcock (England) G Adcock	20	15

Semi-finals
1	(China) Zheng SW (China) Chen QC	21	19	23
(China) Wang YL (China) Huang DP	13	21	21

=== Bottom half ===
First round
(Singapore) Terry Hee Y K (Singapore) Tan W H	21	21
PFQ	(Australia) J Sun (Australia) J Tam	10	12
(Japan) Y Watanabe (Japan) A Higashino	11	19
7	(Indonesia) P Jordan (Indonesia) D Susanto	21	21
Q1	(Japan) T Hoki (Japan) S Hirota	21	19	14
(Malaysia) Chan P S (Malaysia) Cheah Y S	14	21	21
Q3	(Australia) J Schueler (Australia) Celeste Lee	17	18
PFQ	(Indonesia) H Tandjaya (Indonesia) S Putri	21	21
(Hong Kong) Lee C H (Hong Kong) Chau H W	21	21
(India) S Rankireddy (India) A Ponnappa	13	17
(Chinese Taipei) Wang C-l (Chinese Taipei) Lee C-h	18	21	20
8	(Thailand) D Puavaranukroh (Thailand) S Taerattanachai	21	19	22
(South Korea) Kim D-y (South Korea) Kim H-n	21	21
(Indonesia) Y F Mainaky (Indonesia) L A Mainaky	8	9
(Hong Kong) Tang C M (Hong Kong) Tse Y S	21	21
PFQ	(Australia) M Chau (Australia) L Ma	18	15

Second round
(Singapore) Terry Hee Y K (Singapore) Tan W H	6	12
7	(Indonesia) P Jordan (Indonesia) D Susanto	21	21
(Malaysia) Chan P S (Malaysia) Cheah Y S	21	21
PFQ	(Indonesia) H Tandjaya (Indonesia) S Putri	10	5
(Hong Kong) Lee C H (Hong Kong) Chau H W	9	18
8	(Thailand) D Puavaranukroh (Thailand) S Taerattanachai	21	21
(South Korea) Kim D-y (South Korea) Kim H-n	21	21
(Hong Kong) Tang C M (Hong Kong) Tse Y S	6	15

Quarter-finals
7	(Indonesia) P Jordan (Indonesia) D Susanto	21	21
(Malaysia) Chan P S (Malaysia) Cheah Y S	8	17
8	(Thailand) D Puavaranukroh (Thailand) S Taerattanachai	12	17
(South Korea) Kim D-y (South Korea) Kim H-n	21	21

Semi-finals
7	(Indonesia) P Jordan (Indonesia) D Susanto	21	21
(South Korea) Kim D-y (South Korea) Kim H-n	19	16

=== Finals ===
Semi-finals
1	(China) Zheng Siwei (China) Chen Qingchen	21	19	23
(China) Wang Yilu (China) Huang Dongping	13	21	21
7	(Indonesia) Praveen Jordan (Indonesia) Debby Susanto	21	21
(South Korea) Kim Duk-young (South Korea) Kim Ha-na	19	16

Final
1	(China) Zheng Siwei (China) Chen Qingchen	18	21	21
7	(Indonesia) Praveen Jordan (Indonesia) Debby Susanto	21	14	17

Preceded by 2016 Australian Super Series	Australian Open	Succeeded by 2018 Australian Open
Preceded by 2017 Indonesia Super Series Premier	BWF Super Series; 2017 BWF Season	Succeeded by 2017 Korea Open Super Series
