= 2016 Australian Super Series =

Tournament details
- Dates: 7 June 2016 – 12 June 2016
- Level: Super Series
- Total prize money: US$750,000
- Venue: State Sports Centre
- Location: Sydney, New South Wales, Australia

Champions
- Men's singles: (Denmark) Hans-Kristian Vittinghus
- Women's singles: (India) Saina Nehwal
- Men's doubles: (Indonesia) Markus Fernaldi Gideon (Indonesia) Kevin Sanjaya Sukamuljo
- Women's doubles: (China) Bao Yixin (China) Chen Qingchen
- Mixed doubles: (China) Lu Kai (China) Huang Yaqiong

The 2016 Australian Super Series was the fifth Super Series tournament of the 2016 BWF Super Series in badminton. The tournament was held in Sydney, Australia from 07–12 June 2016 with a total purse of $750,000.

== Players by nation ==
Nation	First round	Second round	Quarterfinals	Semifinals	Final
(Australia)	29	1			
(Denmark)	6	6	1		
(Indonesia)	6	4	1	3	2
(Japan)	6	1	5	1	
(China)	3	5	6	4	2
(India)	3	2		1	
(Chinese Taipei)	3	1	2		
(Singapore)	3	1			
(Malaysia)	2	8	1	1	
(South Korea)	2	2	2		1
(Hong Kong)	1	2	1		
(Pakistan)	1	2			
(United States)	1				
(France)	1				
(Belgium)	1				
(Estonia)	1				
(Canada)	1				
(Scotland)	1				
(New Caledonia)	1				
(Vietnam)		2			
(England)		2			
(Thailand)		1	1		
(Spain)		1			

== Men's singles ==
=== Seeds ===
1. (China) Chen Long (quarterfinals)
2. (Malaysia) Lee Chong Wei (withdrew)
3. (China) Lin Dan (withdrew)
4. (Denmark) Viktor Axelsen (withdrew)
5. (Denmark) Jan Ø. Jørgensen (withdrew)
6. (China) Tian Houwei (first round)
7. (Chinese Taipei) Chou Tien-chen (first round)
8. (Indonesia) Tommy Sugiarto (withdrew)

=== Top half ===
First Round
1	(China) Chen L	21	21
Q3	(Australia) H Tang	3	4
Q2	(Australia) A Joe	13	6
(Malaysia) Z Zulkiffli	21	21
7	(Chinese Taipei) Chou T-c	8	12
(Indonesia) A S Ginting	21	21
(Indonesia) I M Mustofa	20	21	15
(India) S Verma	22	15	21
PFQ	(Japan) T Ueda	13	17
(Vietnam) Nguyen T M	21	21
Q1	(Australia) S Leung	5	6
(South Korea) Jeon H-j	21	21
PFQ	(Estonia) R Must	12	17
(Spain) P Abián	21	21
(Hong Kong) Hu Y	21	12	21
Q4	(India) R. M. V. Gurusaidutt	19	21	15

Second Round
1	(China) Chen L	21	21
(Malaysia) Z Zulkiffli	17	12
(Indonesia) A S Ginting	11	21	21
(India) S Verma	21	7	19
(Vietnam) Nguyen T M	19	14
(South Korea) Jeon H-j	21	21
(Spain) P Abián	18	21	13
(Hong Kong) Hu Y	21	16	21

Quarterfinals
1	(China) Chen L	14	17
(Indonesia) A S Ginting	21	21
(South Korea) Jeon H-j	w	/	o
(Hong Kong) Hu Y

Semifinals
(Indonesia) A S Ginting	19	21	19
(South Korea) Jeon H-j	21	16	21

=== Bottom half ===
First Round
(Japan) S Sasaki	21	21
(Chinese Taipei) Hsu J-h	14	12
(Malaysia) I Z Zainuddin	21	21
PFQ	(France) B Leverdez	12	14
PFQ	(Singapore) D Wong	10	16
(Denmark) H-K Vittinghus	21	21
(England) R Ouseph	11	21	21
PFQ	(Denmark) R Fladberg	21	17	9
(Hong Kong) Ng K L	16	12
(India) S Kidambi	21	21
(Indonesia) S D Kuncoro	21	21
6	(China) Tian HW	16	12
PFQ	(China) Huang YX	21	13	20
(China) Wang ZM	19	21	22
(Indonesia) J Christie	15	14
PFQ	(South Korea) Heo K-h	21	21

Second Round
(Japan) S Sasaki	21	21
(Malaysia) I Z Zainuddin	12	16
(Denmark) H-K Vittinghus	21	20	21
(England) R Ouseph	19	22	16
(India) S Kidambi	21	21
(Indonesia) S D Kuncoro	19	12
(China) Wang ZM	30	12	2^{r}
PFQ	(South Korea) Heo K-h	29	21	11

Quarterfinals
(Japan) S Sasaki	14	18
(Denmark) H-K Vittinghus	21	21
(India) S Kidambi	21	21
PFQ	(South Korea) Heo K-h	18	17

Semifinals
(Denmark) H-K Vittinghus	22	21
(India) S Kidambi	20	13

=== Finals ===
Semifinals
(Indonesia) Anthony Sinisuka Ginting	19	21	19
(South Korea) Jeon Hyeok-jin	21	16	21
(Denmark) Hans-Kristian Vittinghus	22	21
(India) Srikanth Kidambi	20	13

Final
(South Korea) Jeon Hyeok-jin	16	21	11
(Denmark) Hans-Kristian Vittinghus	21	19	21

== Women's singles ==
=== Seeds ===
1. (Spain) Carolina Marín (withdrew)
2. (Thailand) Ratchanok Intanon (quarterfinals)
3. (China) Li Xuerui (semifinals)
4. (China) Wang Yihan (semifinals)
5. (Japan) Nozomi Okuhara (first round)
6. (China) Wang Shixian (quarterfinals)
7. (India) Saina Nehwal (champion)
8. (Chinese Taipei) Tai Tzu-ying (quarterfinals)

=== Top half ===
First Round
PFQ	(Australia) M Sun	4	13
(Japan) A Yamaguchi	21	21
(South Korea) Kim H-m	21	21
(India) P.V. Sindhu	15	19
5	(Japan) N Okuhara	23	17	19
(China) Sun Y	21	21	21
Q4	(Indonesia) L A Mainaky	21	21
(Denmark) L Kjærsfeldt	16	19
3	(China) Li XR	21	21
Q1	(Australia) J Tam	12	5
(Vietnam) Vu T T	21	21
(Singapore) Liang XY	18	19
6	(China) Wang SX	21	21
(Chinese Taipei) Pai Y-p	15	15
(United States) I Wang	19	21	14
(China) He BJ	21	18	21

Second Round
(Japan) A Yamaguchi	21	21
(South Korea) Kim H-m	17	14
(China) Sun Y	21	21
Q4	(Indonesia) L A Mainaky	11	7
3	(China) Li XR	21	21
(Vietnam) Vu T T	11	11
6	(China) Wang SX	21	21
(China) He BJ	19	18

Quarterfinals
(Japan) A Yamaguchi	18	9
(China) Sun Y	21	21
3	(China) Li XR	21	21
6	(China) Wang SX	19	17

Semifinals
(China) Sun Y	21	21
3	(China) Li XR	18	19

=== Bottom half ===
First Round
(Australia) Chen H-y	18	11
(Malaysia) Tee J Y	21	21
(Japan) S Sato	12	21	19
8	(Chinese Taipei) Tai T-y	21	19	21
(India) T Lad	18	21	21
Q3	(Australia) T Ho	21	14	11
(Scotland) K Gilmour	16	10
4	(China) Wang YH	21	21
(Malaysia) Goh J W	21	21
(Canada) M Li	18	10
(Australia) J Lai	10	14
7	(India) S Nehwal	21	21
Q2	(Australia) S Kurniawan	8	13
(Hong Kong) Yip P Y	21	21
(Japan) M Mitani	13	16
2	(Thailand) R Intanon	21	21

Second Round
(Malaysia) Tee J Y	10	19
8	(Chinese Taipei) Tai T-y	21	21
(India) T Lad	18	6
4	(China) Wang YH	21	21
(Malaysia) Goh J W	12	14
7	(India) S Nehwal	21	21
(Hong Kong) Yip P Y	7	9
2	(Thailand) R Intanon	21	21

Quarterfinals
8	(Chinese Taipei) Tai T-y	19	15
4	(China) Wang YH	21	21
7	(India) S Nehwal	28	21
2	(Thailand) R Intanon	26	16

Semifinals
4	(China) Wang YH	8	12
7	(India) S Nehwal	21	21

=== Finals ===
Semifinals
(China) Sun Yu	21	21
3	(China) Li Xuerui	18	19
4	(China) Wang Yihan	8	12
7	(India) Saina Nehwal	21	21

Final
(China) Sun Yu	21	14	19
7	(India) Saina Nehwal	11	21	21

== Men's doubles ==
=== Seeds ===
1. (Indonesia) Mohammad Ahsan / Hendra Setiawan (second round)
2. (China) Fu Haifeng / Zhang Nan (quarterfinals)
3. (China) Chai Biao / Hong Wei (first round)
4. (Japan) Hiroyuki Endo / Kenichi Hayakawa (quarterfinals)
5. (China) Li Junhui / Liu Yuchen (second round)
6. (Indonesia) Angga Pratama / Ricky Karanda Suwardi (final)
7. (Indonesia) Markus Fernaldi Gideon / Kevin Sanjaya Sukamuljo (champion)
8. (Malaysia) Goh V Shem / Tan Wee Kiong (second round)

=== Top half ===
First Round
1	(Indonesia) M Ahsan (Indonesia) H Setiawan	21	21
Q1	(Australia) F Kurniawan (Australia) Lim C S	9	8
(Belgium) M Dierickx (Belgium) F Golinski	16	21	13
(Malaysia) Koo K K (Malaysia) Tan B H	21	16	21
8	(Malaysia) Goh V S (Malaysia) Tan W K	21	21
(India) N Garg (India) M. A Raju	12	10
Q4	(Malaysia) M S I Zainal Abidin (Malaysia) M A Zainuddin	17	20
(Indonesia) B Angriawan (Indonesia) R A Saputro	21	22
3	(China) Chai B (China) Hong W	16	21	17
(Chinese Taipei) Chen H-l (Chinese Taipei) Wang C-l	21	8	21
(Australia) L Defolky (Australia) J Sun	8	6
(South Korea) Choi S-g (South Korea) Kim J-h	21	21
6	(Indonesia) A Pratama (Indonesia) R K Suwardi	21	21
PFQ	(New Caledonia) R Ho-Yagues (New Caledonia) M Paitio	3	8
(Australia) M Chau (Australia) S Serasinghe	21	11	13
(Denmark) K Antonsen (Denmark) N Nohr	18	21	21

Second Round
1	(Indonesia) M Ahsan (Indonesia) H Setiawan	21	17	19
(Malaysia) Koo K K (Malaysia) Tan B H	17	21	21
8	(Malaysia) Goh V S (Malaysia) Tan W K	14	18
(Indonesia) B Angriawan (Indonesia) R A Saputro	21	21
(Chinese Taipei) Chen H-l (Chinese Taipei) Wang C-l	21	21
(South Korea) Choi S-g (South Korea) Kim J-h	15	10
6	(Indonesia) A Pratama (Indonesia) R K Suwardi	21	21
(Denmark) K Antonsen (Denmark) N Nohr	15	19

Quarterfinals
(Malaysia) Koo K K (Malaysia) Tan B H	18	18
(Indonesia) B Angriawan (Indonesia) R A Saputro	21	21
(Chinese Taipei) Chen H-l (Chinese Taipei) Wang C-l	17	9
6	(Indonesia) A Pratama (Indonesia) R K Suwardi	21	21

Semifinals
(Indonesia) B Angriawan (Indonesia) R A Saputro	16	14
6	(Indonesia) A Pratama (Indonesia) R K Suwardi	21	21

=== Bottom half ===
First Round
(China) Liu C (China) Zheng SW	21	21
(Pakistan) R Azam (Australia) M Fariman	9	10
(Denmark) M Christiansen (Denmark) D Daugaard	19	19
5	(China) Li JH (China) Liu YC	21	21
(Indonesia) H A Gunawan (Indonesia) M Kido	w	/	o
Q2	(Australia) B Halim (Australia) T R Pham
PFQ	(Australia) S Leung (Australia) M Wheller	8	5
4	(Japan) H Endo (Japan) K Hayakawa	21	21
(Denmark) K Astrup (Denmark) A S Rasmussen	21	21
(Singapore) Terry Hee Y K (Singapore) Loh K H	14	15
Q3	(Malaysia) A M Mazlan (Malaysia) A S A R M S Bakhtir	10	8
7	(Indonesia) M F Gideon (Indonesia) K S Sukamuljo	21	21
(Australia) C Chen (Australia) S Kumar	15	6
(Malaysia) N M A Ayub (Malaysia) J Singh	21	21
(Japan) T Kamura (Japan) K Sonoda	17	8
2	(China) Fu HF (China) Zhang N	21	21

Second Round
(China) Liu C (China) Zheng SW	21	21
5	(China) Li JH (China) Liu YC	15	10
(Indonesia) H A Gunawan (Indonesia) M Kido	24	9	13
4	(Japan) H Endo (Japan) K Hayakawa	22	21	21
(Denmark) K Astrup (Denmark) A S Rasmussen	21	17	18
7	(Indonesia) M F Gideon (Indonesia) K S Sukamuljo	17	21	21
(Malaysia) N M A Ayub (Malaysia) J Singh	14	7
2	(China) Fu HF (China) Zhang N	21	21

Quarterfinals
(China) Liu C (China) Zheng SW	21	21
4	(Japan) H Endo (Japan) K Hayakawa	6	17
7	(Indonesia) M F Gideon (Indonesia) K S Sukamuljo	21	21
2	(China) Fu HF (China) Zhang N	13	18

Semifinals
(China) Liu C (China) Zheng SW	17	11
7	(Indonesia) M F Gideon (Indonesia) K S Sukamuljo	21	21

=== Finals ===
Semifinals
(Indonesia) Berry Angriawan (Indonesia) Rian Agung Saputro	16	14
6	(Indonesia) Angga Pratama (Indonesia) Ricky Karanda Suwardi	21	21
(China) Liu Cheng (China) Zheng Siwei	17	11
7	(Indonesia) Markus Fernaldi Gideon (Indonesia) Kevin Sanjaya Sukamuljo	21	21

Final
6	(Indonesia) Angga Pratama (Indonesia) Ricky Karanda Suwardi	14	15
7	(Indonesia) Markus Fernaldi Gideon (Indonesia) Kevin Sanjaya Sukamuljo	21	21

== Women's doubles ==
=== Seeds ===
1. (Japan) Misaki Matsutomo / Ayaka Takahashi (quarterfinals)
2. (Indonesia) Nitya Krishinda Maheswari / Greysia Polii (final)
3. (China) Tang Yuanting / Yu Yang (semifinals)
4. (China) Tian Qing / Zhao Yunlei (withdrew)
5. (Denmark) Christinna Pedersen / Kamilla Rytter Juhl (second round)
6. (China) Luo Ying / Luo Yu (withdrew)
7. (Japan) Naoko Fukuman / Kurumi Yonao (semifinals)
8. (Japan) Shizuka Matsuo / Mami Naito (second round)

=== Top half ===
First Round
(China) Bao YX (China) Chen QC	21	21
(Indonesia) D D Haris (Indonesia) R E Putri Sari	16	12
(Australia) S Mapasa (Australia) G Somerville	14	21	9
(Thailand) P Supajirakul (Thailand) S Taerattanachai	21	18	21

Second Round
1	(Japan) M Matsutomo (Japan) A Takahashi	21	21
(Chinese Taipei) Chiang K-h (Chinese Taipei) Hung S-h	12	9
8	(Japan) S Matsuo (Japan) M Naito	21	13	12
(China) Bao YX (China) Chen QC	14	21	21
4	(China) Tian Q (China) Zhao YL
(South Korea) Chae Y-j (South Korea) Kim J-w	w	/	o
7	(Japan) N Fukuman (Japan) K Yonao	21	21
(Thailand) P Supajirakul (Thailand) S Taerattanachai	10	17

Quarterfinals
1	(Japan) M Matsutomo (Japan) A Takahashi
(China) Bao YX (China) Chen QC	w	/	o
(South Korea) Chae Y-j (South Korea) Kim J-w	20	12
7	(Japan) N Fukuman (Japan) K Yonao	22	21

Semifinals
(China) Bao YX (China) Chen QC	15	21	21
7	(Japan) N Fukuman (Japan) K Yonao	21	18	16

=== Bottom half ===
First Round
(China) Huang YQ (China) Tang JH	21	21
(Australia) E Y Kwok (Australia) J Son	6	6
(Malaysia) Vivian Hoo K M (Malaysia) Woon K W	21	21
(Australia) R Ngai (Australia) J Tam	9	7
(Denmark) M Fruergaard (Denmark) S Thygesen	21	21
(Australia) C Lam (Australia) M Sun	8	3

Second Round
(China) Huang YQ (China) Tang JH	21	21
5	(Denmark) C Pedersen (Denmark) K Rytter Juhl	12	19
(Malaysia) Vivian Hoo K M (Malaysia) Woon K W	18	21	17
3	(China) Tang YT (China) Yu Y	21	12	21
(Denmark) M Fruergaard (Denmark) S Thygesen	w	/	o
6	(China) Luo Y (China) Luo Y
(Australia) Chen H-y (Australia) T Ho	11	5
2	(Indonesia) N K Maheswari (Indonesia) G Polii	21	21

Quarterfinals
(China) Huang YQ (China) Tang JH	10	19
3	(China) Tang YT (China) Yu Y	21	21
(Denmark) M Fruergaard (Denmark) S Thygesen	12	12
2	(Indonesia) N K Maheswari (Indonesia) G Polii	21	21

Semifinals
3	(China) Tang YT (China) Yu Y	18	17
2	(Indonesia) N K Maheswari (Indonesia) G Polii	21	21

=== Finals ===
Semifinals
(China) Bao Yixin (China) Chen Qingchen	15	21	21
7	(Japan) Naoko Fukuman (Japan) Kurumi Yonao	21	18	16
3	(China) Tang Yuanting (China) Yu Yang	18	17
2	(Indonesia) Nitya Krishinda Maheswari (Indonesia) Greysia Polii	21	21

Final
(China) Bao Yixin (China) Chen Qingchen	23	21
2	(Indonesia) Nitya Krishinda Maheswari (Indonesia) Greysia Polii	21	17

== Mixed doubles ==
=== Seeds ===
1. (Indonesia) Tontowi Ahmad / Liliyana Natsir (first round)
2. (Denmark) Joachim Fischer Nielsen / Christinna Pedersen (second round)
3. (China) Xu Chen / Ma Jin (withdrew)
4. (China) Liu Cheng / Bao Yixin (quarterfinals)
5. (England) Chris Adcock / Gabrielle Adcock (second round)
6. (Indonesia) Praveen Jordan / Debby Susanto (semifinals)
7. (Malaysia) Chan Peng Soon / Goh Liu Ying (semifinals)
8. (China) Lu Kai / Huang Yaqiong (champion)

=== Top half ===
First Round
1	(Indonesia) T Ahmad (Indonesia) L Natsir	12	21	15
(Denmark) A S Rasmussen (Denmark) M Fruergaard	21	18	21
Q4	(Australia) C Chen (Australia) R Ngai	2	9
(Japan) K Kazuno (Japan) A Kurihara	21	21
5	(England) C Adcock (England) G Adcock	11	21	22
(South Korea) Choi S-g (South Korea) Chae Y-j	21	18	20
Q1	(Australia) L Defolky (Australia) M Sun	7	8
(China) Zheng SW (China) Chen QC	21	21
PFQ	(Indonesia) Y F Mainaky (Indonesia) L A Mainaky	6	9
Q3	(Denmark) K Astrup (Denmark) L Kjaersfeldt	21	21
(Indonesia) R Widianto (Indonesia) R P Dili	21	21
Q2	(Australia) J Sun (Australia) J Tam	8	10
6	(Indonesia) P Jordan (Indonesia) D Susanto	21	21
(South Korea) Kim J-h (South Korea) Kim J-w	18	13
(Singapore) Terry Hee Y K (Singapore) Tan W T	16	21	21
(Indonesia) R Alexander (Indonesia) M D Oktaviani	21	15	14

Second Round
(Denmark) A S Rasmussen (Denmark) M Fruergaard	21	16	14
(Japan) K Kazuno (Japan) A Kurihara	15	21	21
5	(England) C Adcock (England) G Adcock	16	18
(China) Zheng SW (China) Chen QC	21	21
Q3	(Denmark) K Astrup (Denmark) L Kjaersfeldt	21	21	14
(Indonesia) R Widianto (Indonesia) R P Dili	14	23	21
6	(Indonesia) P Jordan (Indonesia) D Susanto	21	22
(Singapore) Terry Hee Y K (Singapore) Tan W T	13	20

Quarterfinals
(Japan) K Kazuno (Japan) A Kurihara	17	12
(China) Zheng SW (China) Chen QC	21	21
(Indonesia) R Widianto (Indonesia) R P Dili	19	16
6	(Indonesia) P Jordan (Indonesia) D Susanto	21	21

Semifinals
(China) Zheng SW (China) Chen QC	19	21	21
6	(Indonesia) P Jordan (Indonesia) D Susanto	21	11	16

=== Bottom half ===
First Round
(Pakistan) R Azam (Pakistan) S Mohmand	22	16	21
(Australia) H Tang (Australia) T Ho	20	21	19
(Denmark) N Nohr (Denmark) S Thygesen	15	7
8	(China) Lu K (China) Huang YQ	21	21
(Malaysia) Tan K M (Malaysia) Lai P J	21	21
(Australia) S Serasinghe (Australia) S Mapasa	18	16
(Australia) T H Pham (Australia) S Kurniawan	4	1^{r}
4	(China) Liu C (China) Bao YX	21	10
(Hong Kong) Lee C H (Hong Kong) Chau H W	21	21
(Australia) S Leung (Australia) C Lam	17	16
(Australia) R Middleton (Australia) L Choo	19	17
7	(Malaysia) Chan P S (Malaysia) Goh L Y	21	21
(China) Liu YC (China) Tang JH	21	21
(Japan) K Sonoda (Japan) N Fukuman	12	7
(Denmark) K Antonsen (Australia) G Somerville	10	16
2	(Denmark) J Fischer Nielsen (Denmark) C Pedersen	21	21

Second Round
(Pakistan) R Azam (Pakistan) S Mohmand	7	5
8	(China) Lu K (China) Huang YQ	21	21
(Malaysia) Tan K M (Malaysia) Lai P J	9	21	11
4	(China) Liu C (China) Bao YX	21	19	21
(Hong Kong) Lee C H (Hong Kong) Chau H W	11	15
7	(Malaysia) Chan P S (Malaysia) Goh L Y	21	21
(China) Liu YC (China) Tang JH	21	21
2	(Denmark) J Fischer Nielsen (Denmark) C Pedersen	18	16

Quarterfinals
8	(China) Lu K (China) Huang YQ	21	21
4	(China) Liu C (China) Bao YX	9	16
7	(Malaysia) Chan P S (Malaysia) Goh L Y	21	21
(China) Liu YC (China) Tang JH	15	15

Semifinals
8	(China) Lu K (China) Huang YQ	21	21
7	(Malaysia) Chan P S (Malaysia) Goh L Y	15	12

=== Finals ===
Semifinals
(China) Zheng Siwei (China) Chen Qingchen	19	21	21
6	(Indonesia) Praveen Jordan (Indonesia) Debby Susanto	21	11	16
8	(China) Lu Kai (China) Huang Yaqiong	21	21
7	(Malaysia) Chan Peng Soon (Malaysia) Goh Liu Ying	15	12

Final
(China) Zheng Siwei (China) Chen Qingchen	18	14
8	(China) Lu Kai (China) Huang Yaqiong	21	21

Preceded by 2015 Australian Super Series	Australian Open	Succeeded by 2017 Australian Super Series
Preceded by 2016 Indonesia Super Series Premier	BWF Super Series; 2016 BWF Season	Succeeded by 2016 Japan Super Series
