= Hans-Kristian Vittinghus =

Danish badminton player (born 1986)

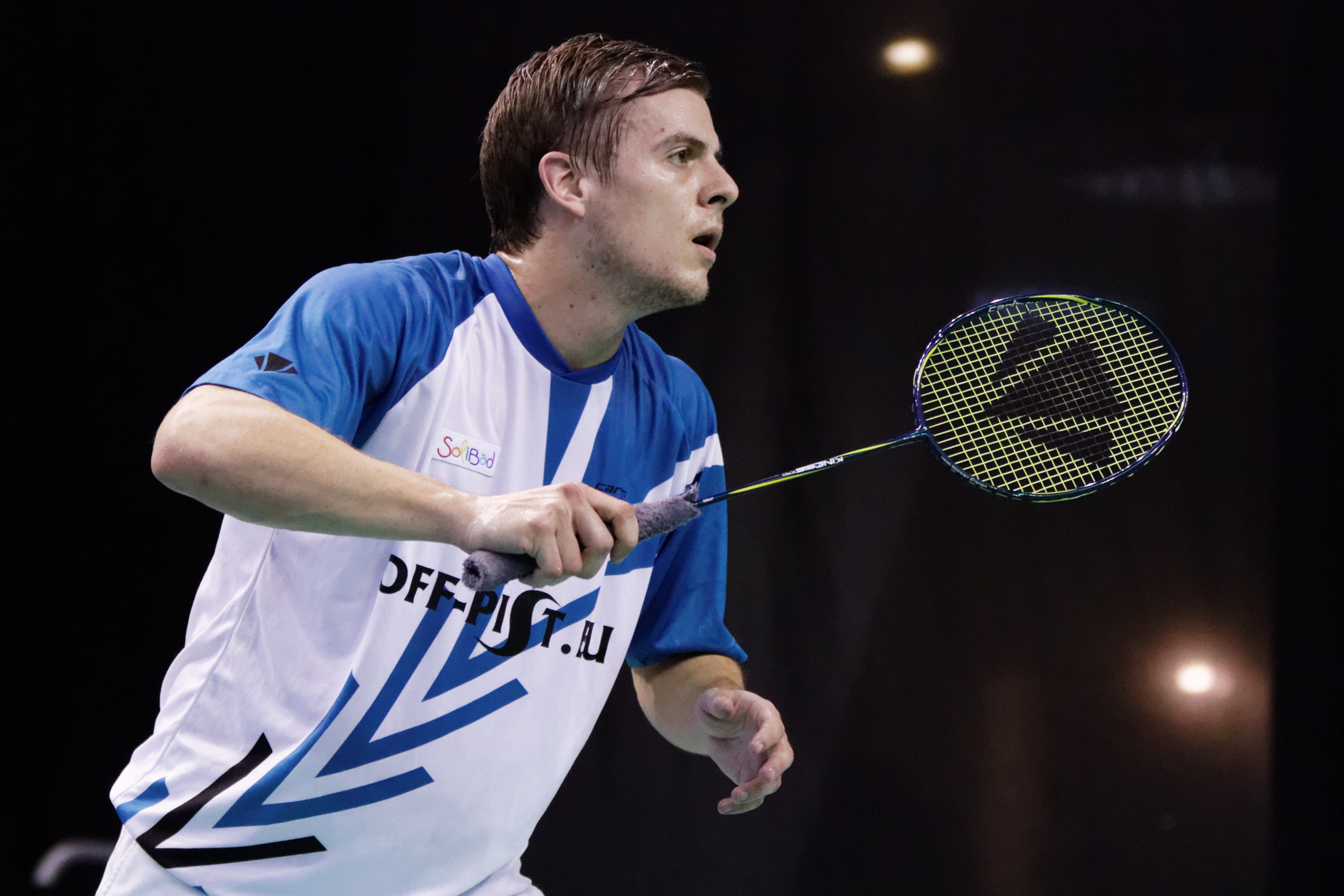
- Hans-Kristian Vittinghus at the 2013 French Super Series.

Personal information
- Born: 16 January 1986 (age 40) Frederikshavn, Denmark
- Years active: 2005–2023
- Height: 1.80 m (5 ft 11 in)
- Weight: 82 kg (181 lb)

Sport
- Country: Denmark
- Sport: Badminton
- Handedness: Right

Men's singles
- Career record: 359 wins, 232 losses
- Highest ranking: 8 (22 January 2015)
- BWF profile
Medal record
Men's badminton
Representing Denmark
Thomas Cup
Gold medal – first place	2016 Kunshan	Men's team
Bronze medal – third place	2012 Wuhan	Men's team
Bronze medal – third place	2018 Bangkok	Men's team
Bronze medal – third place	2020 Aarhus	Men's team
Bronze medal – third place	2022 Bangkok	Men's team
European Championships
Bronze medal – third place	2017 Kolding	Men's singles
Bronze medal – third place	2021 Kyiv	Men's singles
European Mixed Team Championships
Gold medal – first place	2011 Amsterdam	Mixed team
Gold medal – first place	2015 Leuven	Mixed team
Gold medal – first place	2017 Lubin	Mixed team
Gold medal – first place	2023 Aire-sur-la-Lys	Mixed team
Silver medal – second place	2013 Moscow	Mixed team
European Men's Team Championships
Gold medal – first place	2008 Almere	Men's team
Gold medal – first place	2010 Warsaw	Men's team
Gold medal – first place	2012 Amsterdam	Men's team
Gold medal – first place	2014 Basel	Men's team
Gold medal – first place	2016 Kazan	Men's team
Gold medal – first place	2018 Kazan	Men's team
Gold medal – first place	2020 Liévin	Men's team
European Junior Championships
Gold medal – first place	2005 Den Bosch	Mixed team
Bronze medal – third place	2005 Den Bosch	Boys' singles

Hans-Kristian Solberg Vittinghus (born 16 January 1986) is a Danish retired badminton player. He was a member of the winning Denmark team at the 2016 Thomas Cup in Kunshan, China.

== Career ==
=== Junior ===
He won 4 junior national titles, 2 in singles in 2003 and 2005 and 2 in men's doubles in 1999 and 2003. As a part of the Danish Under 19 national team, he won the gold medal at the Under 19 European Team Championships. He also won a bronze medal in the individual event in men's singles.

=== Senior ===
After becoming a senior player in the summer of 2005, he won his first international title in November 2006, beating former world no. 1, M. Roslin Hashim in the final of the Norwegian International Championships. Since then he has recaptured the title in Norway twice, in 2009 and 2010.

He also won the Turkiye International in 2007, Dutch International in 2008 & 2011, Spanish Open in 2009 and 2013, Irish International in 2010, Belgian International in 2014 and Denmark International in 2019.

He also plays in the Danish Badminton League. He plays as the first singles for Højbjerg Badminton. Hans-Kristian Vittinghus started playing badminton at the age of five in Solrød Strand Badmintonklub.

In November 2015, he won the Scottish Grand Prix in Glasgow, Scotland, against English Rajiv Ouseph as the no.1 seed, 21–19, 11–21, 21–16.

In June 2016, he beat Ihsan Maulana Mustofa of Indonesia to win the first Thomas Cup trophy for Denmark. He later won his first BWF Super Series title, the Australian Open Super Series, beating Jeon Hyeok-jin from Korea 21–16, 19–21, 21–11.

In January 2021, Vittinghus reached his first major final since the Dubai World Superseries Finals title clash in 2014 at the Super 1000 Thailand Open where he came runner up to compatriot, Viktor Axelsen.

Vittinghus first hinted at retirement in 2022 when he made the decision to post an announcement on social media. Although Vittinghus would officially retire from badminton at the age of 37 in November 2023, after competing in his last tournament at the Norwegian International.

== Personal life ==
Vittinghus married Norwegian dressage rider Selina Hundstuen Solberg on 11 September 2016. They have one child together, named Vincent.

Vittinghus hosts his own podcast called A Year On Tour with Vittinghus, where he talks about his experience on tournaments and various BWF World Tour events he has participated in. He also co-hosts another podcast together with fellow Danish badminton player Anders Antonsen, called The Badminton Experience, where they cover many different topics on badminton, ranging from players and technical aspects of the game. They also host Q&A sessions from time to time, and sometimes, they invite other badminton players to come on the podcasts as guests, to share their experience and answer questions from the hosts. Notable players that have been on the podcast include Lee Zii Jia, Greysia Polli, Anthony Sinisuka Ginting and former Danish Men's singles player Peter Gade.

== Achievements ==
=== European Championships ===
Men's singles
Year	Venue	Opponent	Score	Result
2017	Sydbank Arena; Kolding, Denmark	(England) Rajiv Ouseph	21–18, 21–23, 16–21	Bronze
2021	Palace of Sports; Kyiv, Ukraine	(Denmark) Anders Antonsen	14–21, 17–21	Bronze

=== European Junior Championships ===
Boys' singles
Year	Venue	Opponent	Score	Result
2005	De Maaspoort; Den Bosch, Netherlands	(Germany) Dieter Domke	10–15, 7–15	Bronze

=== BWF World Tour (1 runner-up) ===
The BWF World Tour, which was announced on 19 March 2017 and implemented in 2018, is a series of elite badminton tournaments sanctioned by the Badminton World Federation (BWF). The BWF World Tours are divided into levels of World Tour Finals, Super 1000, Super 750, Super 500, Super 300 (part of the HSBC World Tour), and the BWF Tour Super 100.

Men's singles
Year	Tournament	Level	Opponent	Score	Result
2020 (II)	Thailand Open	Super 1000	(Denmark) Viktor Axelsen	11–21, 7–21	(silver) Runner-up

=== BWF Superseries (1 title, 1 runner-up) ===
The BWF Superseries, which was launched on 14 December 2006 and implemented in 2007, was a series of elite badminton tournaments, sanctioned by the Badminton World Federation (BWF). BWF Superseries levels were Superseries and Superseries Premier. A season of Superseries consisted of twelve tournaments around the world that had been introduced since 2011. Successful players were invited to the Superseries Finals, which were held at the end of each year.

Men's singles
Year	Tournament	Opponent	Score	Result
2014	Dubai World Superseries Finals	(China) Chen Long	16–21, 10–21	(silver) Runner-up
2016	Australian Open	(South Korea) Jeon Hyeok-jin	21–16, 19–21, 21–11	(gold) Winner

BWF Super Series Finals tournament
BWF Super Series Premier tournament
BWF Super Series tournament

=== BWF Grand Prix (2 titles, 4 runners-up) ===
The BWF Grand Prix had two levels, the Grand Prix and Grand Prix Gold. It was a series of badminton tournaments sanctioned by the Badminton World Federation (BWF) and played between 2007 and 2017.

Men's singles
Year	Tournament	Opponent	Score	Result
2010	Bitburger Open	(China) Chen Long	3–21, 21–12, 9–21	(silver) Runner-up
2011	Bitburger Open	(China) Wang Zhengming	21–18, 21–10	(gold) Winner
2013	London Grand Prix Gold	(China) Tian Houwei	20–22, 16–21	(silver) Runner-up
2014	German Open	(India) Arvind Bhat	22–24, 21–19, 11–21	(silver) Runner-up
2015	U.S. Open	(Malaysia) Lee Chong Wei	20–22, 12–21	(silver) Runner-up
2015	Scottish Open	(England) Rajiv Ouseph	21–19, 11–21, 21–16	(gold) Winner

BWF Grand Prix Gold tournament
BWF Grand Prix tournament

=== BWF International Challenge/Series (11 titles, 1 runner-up) ===
Men's singles
Year	Tournament	Opponent	Score	Result
2006	Norwegian International	(Malaysia) Muhammad Roslin Hashim	22–20, 6–21, 21–16	(gold) Winner
2007	Turkiye International	(Czech Republic) Petr Koukal	23–21, 21–15	(gold) Winner
2008	Dutch International	(China) Wu Yunyong	21–12, 21–18	(gold) Winner
2009	Norwegian International	(Germany) Marc Zwiebler	15–21, 21–18, 21–19	(gold) Winner
2009	Spanish Open	(India) Kashyap Parupalli	21–10, 21–16	(gold) Winner
2010	Norwegian International	(Sweden) Henri Hurskainen	21–16, 19–21, 21–8	(gold) Winner
2010	Irish International	(Spain) Pablo Abián	21–13, 14–21, 23–21	(gold) Winner
2011	Dutch International	(Finland) Ville Lång	18–21, 21–15, 21–4	(gold) Winner
2011	Denmark International	(Denmark) Jan Ø. Jørgensen	15–21, 12–21	(silver) Runner-up
2013	Spanish Open	(Denmark) Joachim Persson	21–9, 21–16	(gold) Winner
2014	Belgian International	(Germany) Marc Zwiebler	11–8, 10–11, 11–9, 11–9	(gold) Winner
2019	Denmark International	(Germany) Kai Schäfer	21–16, 21–18	(gold) Winner

BWF International Challenge tournament
BWF International Series tournament
