= 2025 BWF World Championships – Mixed doubles =

Badminton championships

Mixed doubles at the 2025 BWF World Championships
- Venue: Adidas Arena
- Location: Paris, France
- Dates: 25–31 August
- Competitors: 96 from 28 nations

Medalists
gold medal	Chen Tang Jie; Toh Ee Wei	Malaysia
silver medal	Jiang Zhenbang; Wei Yaxin	China
bronze medal	Thom Gicquel; Delphine Delrue	France
bronze medal	Guo Xinwa; Chen Fanghui	China

The mixed doubles tournament of the 2025 BWF World Championships took place from 26 to 31 August 2025 at the Adidas Arena in Paris.

== Seeds ==
The seeding list was based on the World Rankings of 5 August 2025.

1. (China) Feng Yanzhe / Huang Dongping (second round)
2. (China) Jiang Zhenbang / Wei Yaxin (final)
3. (Thailand) Dechapol Puavaranukroh / Supissara Paewsampran (third round)
4. (Malaysia) Chen Tang Jie / Toh Ee Wei (champions)
5. (Hong Kong) Tang Chun Man / Tse Ying Suet (third round)
6. (Malaysia) Goh Soon Huat / Shevon Jemie Lai (third round)
7. (China) Guo Xinwa / Chen Fanghui (semi-finals)
8. (France) Thom Gicquel / Delphine Delrue (semi-finals)

9. (Japan) Hiroki Midorikawa / Natsu Saito (quarter-finals)
10. (Denmark) Jesper Toft / Amalie Magelund (third round)
11. (Indonesia) Jafar Hidayatullah / Felisha Pasaribu (third round)
12. (China) Cheng Xing / Zhang Chi (quarter-finals)
13. (Chinese Taipei) Yang Po-hsuan / Hu Ling-fang (third round)
14. (Thailand) Ruttanapak Oupthong / Jhenicha Sudjaipraparat (second round)
15. (Malaysia) Hoo Pang Ron / Cheng Su Yin (quarter-finals)
16. (India) Dhruv Kapila / Tanisha Crasto (quarter-finals)

Click on the seed number of a player to go to their draw section.

== Draw ==
The drawing ceremony was held on 14 August 2023.

=== Finals ===
Semi-finals
8	(France) Thom Gicquel (France) Delphine Delrue	18	16
4	(Malaysia) Chen Tang Jie (Malaysia) Toh Ee Wei	21	21
7	(China) Guo Xinwa (China) Chen Fanghui	21	21	18
2	(China) Jiang Zhenbang (China) Wei Yaxin	11	23	21

Final
4	(Malaysia) Chen Tang Jie (Malaysia) Toh Ee Wei	21	21
2	(China) Jiang Zhenbang (China) Wei Yaxin	15	14

=== Top half ===
==== Section 1 ====
First round
(Canada) T A Lindeman (Canada) J Wu	10	8
(Denmark) M Christiansen (Denmark) A Bøje	21	21
(New Zealand) E Lau (New Zealand) S Li	11	9
(Scotland) A Dunn (Scotland) J MacPherson	21	21
(Brazil) F Farias (Brazil) J Lima	21	21
(Slovenia) M Ivancic (Slovenia) P Polanc	19	14
(Chinese Taipei) Ye H-w (Chinese Taipei) N G Chan	21	21
(United States) P Smith (United States) J Gai	11	10

Second round
1	(China) Feng YZ (China) Huang DP	21	13	18
(Denmark) M Christiansen (Denmark) A Bøje	14	21	21
12	(China) Cheng X (China) Zhang C	21	24
(Scotland) A Dunn (Scotland) J MacPherson	17	22
8	(France) T Gicquel (France) D Delrue	21	21
(Brazil) F Farias (Brazil) J Lima	9	15
14	(Thailand) R Oupthong (Thailand) J Sudjaipraparat	18	16
(Chinese Taipei) Ye H-w (Chinese Taipei) N G Chan	21	21

Third round
(Denmark) M Christiansen (Denmark) A Bøje	21	12
12	(China) Cheng X (China) Zhang C	23	21
8	(France) T Gicquel (France) D Delrue	19	21	21
(Chinese Taipei) Ye H-w (Chinese Taipei) N G Chan	21	14	17

Quarter-finals
12	(China) Cheng X (China) Zhang C	19	18
8	(France) T Gicquel (France) D Delrue	21	21

==== Section 2 ====
First round
(Macau) Leong I C (Macau) Ng W C	21	16	18
(India) R Kapoor (India) R Gadde	18	21	21
(Serbia) M Tomić (Serbia) A Vitman	21	21
(Israel) M Zilberman (Israel) S Zilberman	11	6
(Chinese Taipei) Lu M-c (Chinese Taipei) Hung E-t	21	15	16
(Indonesia) R Rivaldy (Indonesia) P H Mentari	14	21	21
(Republic of Ireland) J Magee (Republic of Ireland) M Ryan	21	21
(United States) L Wang (United States) E Wang	10	10

Second round
4	(Malaysia) Chen T J (Malaysia) Toh E W	21	21
(India) R Kapoor (India) R Gadde	16	11
11	(Indonesia) J Hidayatullah (Indonesia) F Pasaribu	21	22
(Serbia) M Tomić (Serbia) A Vitman	19	20
5	(Hong Kong) Tang C M (Hong Kong) Tse Y S	21	21
(Indonesia) R Rivaldy (Indonesia) P H Mentari	16	14
16	(India) D Kapila (India) T Crasto	21	21
(Republic of Ireland) J Magee (Republic of Ireland) M Ryan	11	16

Third round
4	(Malaysia) Chen T J (Malaysia) Toh E W	14	21	21
11	(Indonesia) J Hidayatullah (Indonesia) F Pasaribu	21	19	17
5	(Hong Kong) Tang C M (Hong Kong) Tse Y S	21	12	15
16	(India) D Kapila (India) T Crasto	19	21	21

Quarter-finals
4	(Malaysia) Chen T J (Malaysia) Toh E W	21	21
16	(India) D Kapila (India) T Crasto	15	13

=== Bottom half ===
==== Section 3 ====
First round
(Canada) J Lai (Canada) C Lai	21	18	16
(England) R Easton (England) L Tolman	19	21	21
(Chinese Taipei) Chen C-k (Chinese Taipei) Hsu Y-h	21	21
(Guatemala) C Martinez (Guatemala) D C Soto	6	10
(Japan) Y Shimogami (Japan) S Hobara	21	21
(Ukraine) O Titov (Ukraine) Y Kantemyr	12	14
(Algeria) K Mammeri (Algeria) T Mammeri	10	18
(Singapore) T Hee (Singapore) Jin Y J	21	21

Second round
(England) R Easton (England) L Tolman	15	18
13	(Chinese Taipei) Yang P-h (Chinese Taipei) Hu L-f	21	21
(Chinese Taipei) Chen C-k (Chinese Taipei) Hsu Y-h	14	12
7	(China) Guo XW (China) Chen FH	21	21
(Japan) Y Shimogami (Japan) S Hobara	15	12
9	(Japan) H Midorikawa (Japan) N Saito	21	21
(Singapore) T Hee (Singapore) Jin Y J	18	12
3	(Thailand) D Puavaranukroh (Thailand) S Paewsampran	21	21

Third round
13	(Chinese Taipei) Yang P-h (Chinese Taipei) Hu L-f	13	10
7	(China) Guo XW (China) Chen FH	21	21
9	(Japan) H Midorikawa (Japan) N Saito	8	21	21
3	(Thailand) D Puavaranukroh (Thailand) S Paewsampran	21	19	16

Quarter-finals
7	(China) Guo XW (China) Chen FH	21	21
9	(Japan) H Midorikawa (Japan) N Saito	14	9

==== Section 4 ====
First round
(Germany) M Bourakkadi (Germany) L Michalski	21	21
(Azerbaijan) J Alhasanov (Azerbaijan) H Nuriyeva	8	10
(Thailand) P Teeraratsakul (Thailand) P Muenwong	14	21	21
(France) J Maio (France) L Palermo	21	13	14
(South Korea) Lee J-m (South Korea) Chae Y-j	21	21
(Scotland) A Pringle (Scotland) R Andrew	14	16
(Spain) R García (Spain) L Rodríguez	16	21	14
(England) C Hemming (England) E van Leeuwen	21	17	21

Second round
(Germany) M Bourakkadi (Germany) L Michalski	10	21	12
15	(Malaysia) Hoo P R (Malaysia) Cheng S Y	21	18	21
(Thailand) P Teeraratsakul (Thailand) P Muenwong	19	15
6	(Malaysia) Goh S H (Malaysia) S J Lai	21	21
(South Korea) Lee J-m (South Korea) Chae Y-j	19	16
10	(Denmark) J Toft (Denmark) A Magelund	21	21
(England) C Hemming (England) E van Leeuwen	21	13	15
2	(China) Jiang ZB (China) Wei YX	18	21	21

Third round
15	(Malaysia) Hoo P R (Malaysia) Cheng S Y	13	23	21
6	(Malaysia) Goh S H (Malaysia) S J Lai	21	21	17
10	(Denmark) J Toft (Denmark) A Magelund	15	11
2	(China) Jiang ZB (China) Wei YX	21	21

Quarter-finals
15	(Malaysia) Hoo P R (Malaysia) Cheng S Y	23	15
2	(China) Jiang ZB (China) Wei YX	25	21

== Qualifiers' performances ==
The table below lists out all the qualifiers of this edition by 26 July 2025.

Pair	Date of birth	Pair statistics			Individual statistics			Note
Pair	Date of birth	Appearance	Best Performance(s)		Appearance	Best Performance(s)		Note
Pair	Date of birth	Appearance	Edition(s)	Result	Appearance	Edition(s)	Result	Note
Champions
(Malaysia) Chen Tang Jie	5 January 1998 (aged 27)	2nd	23	QF	3rd	23	QF	PB
(Malaysia) Toh Ee Wei	18 September 2000 (aged 24)	2nd	23	QF	2nd	23	QF	PB
Finalist
(China) Jiang Zhenbang	28 May 2001 (aged 24)	2nd	23	B	2nd	23	B	PB
(China) Wei Yaxin	18 April 2000 (aged 25)	2nd	23	B	2nd	23	B	PB
Semi-finalist
(France) Thom Gicquel	12 January 1999 (aged 26)	7th	21, 22, 23	3R	7th	21, 22, 23	3R	Most participated pair, PB
(France) Delphine Delrue	6 November 1998 (aged 26)	7th	21, 22, 23	3R	7th	21, 22, 23	3R	Most participated pair, PB
(China) Guo Xinwa	6 January 2000 (aged 25)	Debut			Debut			PB
(China) Chen Fanghui	18 April 2000 (aged 25)	Debut			Debut			PB
Quarter-finalist
(China) Cheng Xing	Missing required parameter 1=month! (aged −1)							
(China) Zhang Chi	Missing required parameter 1=month! (aged −1)							
(India) Dhruv Kapila	Missing required parameter 1=month! (aged −1)							
(India) Tanisha Crasto	Missing required parameter 1=month! (aged −1)							
(Japan) Hiroki Midorikawa	17 May 2000 (aged 25)	3rd	22	2R	3rd	22	2R	PB
(Japan) Natsu Saito	9 June 2000 (aged 25)	3rd	22	2R	3rd	22	2R	PB
(Malaysia) Hoo Pang Ron	29 March 1998 (aged 27)							
(Malaysia) Cheng Su Yin	16 June 2003 (aged 22)							
Third rounders
(Denmark) Mathias Christiansen	20 February 1994 (aged 31)	4th	23	QF	6th	18, 23	QF	
(Denmark) Alexandra Bøje	6 December 1999 (aged 25)	4th	23	QF	4th	23	QF	
(Chinese Taipei) Ye Hong-wei	1 November 1999 (aged 25)	Debut			2nd	23	3R	=PB
(Chinese Taipei) Nicole Gonzales Chan	13 December 2004 (aged 20)	Debut			Debut			PB
(Indonesia) Jafar Hidayatullah	9 January 2003 (aged 22)	Debut			Debut			PB
(Indonesia) Felisha Pasaribu	11 September 2005 (aged 19)	Debut			Debut			PB
(Hong Kong) Tang Chun Man	20 March 1995 (aged 30)	7th	18, 21, 23	B	7th	18, 21	B	Most participated pair, Reigning Asian champion
(Hong Kong) Tse Ying Suet	9 November 1991 (aged 33)	7th	18, 21, 23	B	11th	18, 21	B	Most participated pair and qualifier, Reigning Asian champion
(Chinese Taipei) Yang Po-hsuan	23 August 1996 (aged 29)	3rd	22, 23	2R	3rd	22, 23	2R	PB
(Chinese Taipei) Hu Ling-fang	4 June 1998 (aged 27)	3rd	22, 23	2R	4th	17, 22, 23	2R	PB
(Thailand) Dechapol Puavaranukroh	20 May 1997 (aged 28)	Debut			5th	21	G	
(Thailand) Supissara Paewsampran	18 November 1999 (aged 25)	Debut			4th	21, 23	3R	=PB
(Malaysia) Goh Soon Huat	27 June 1990 (aged 35)	6th	21, 22	QF	6th	21, 22	QF	
(Malaysia) Shevon Jemie Lai	8 August 1993 (aged 32)	6th	21, 22	QF	7th	21, 22	QF	
(Denmark) Jesper Toft	7 February 1999 (aged 26)	Debut			Debut			PB
(Denmark) Amalie Magelund	13 May 2000 (aged 25)	Debut			4th	19	2R	PB
Second rounders
(China) Feng Yanzhe	13 February 2001 (aged 24)	2nd	23	3R	2nd	23	3R	
(China) Huang Dongping	20 January 1995 (aged 30)	2nd	23	3R	6th	18	S	
(Scotland) Alexander Dunn	13 September 1998 (aged 26)	Debut			2nd	22	2R	=PB
(Scotland) Julie MacPherson	17 November 1997 (aged 27)	Debut			6th	21, 23	2R	=PB
(Brazil) Fabrício Farias	8 May 2000 (aged 25)	4th	22	2R	4th	22	2R	=PB
(Brazil) Jaqueline Lima	23 April 2001 (aged 24)	4th	22	2R	4th	22	2R	=PB
(Thailand) Ruttanapak Oupthong	Missing required parameter 1=month! (aged −1)							
(Thailand) Jhenicha Sudjaipraparat	Missing required parameter 1=month! (aged −1)							
(India) Rohan Kapoor	Missing required parameter 1=month! (aged −1)							
(India) Ruthvika Gadde	Missing required parameter 1=month! (aged −1)							
(Serbia) Mihajlo Tomić	Missing required parameter 1=month! (aged −1)							
(Serbia) Anđela Vitman	Missing required parameter 1=month! (aged −1)							
(Indonesia) Rinov Rivaldy	12 November 1999 (aged 25)	4th	22, 23	3R	4th	22, 23	3R	
(Indonesia) Pitha Haningtyas Mentari	1 July 1999 (aged 26)	4th	22, 23	3R	4th	22, 23	3R	
(Republic of Ireland) Joshua Magee	Missing required parameter 1=month! (aged −1)							
(Republic of Ireland) Moya Ryan	Missing required parameter 1=month! (aged −1)							
	Missing required parameter 1=month! (aged −1)							
	Missing required parameter 1=month! (aged −1)							
	Missing required parameter 1=month! (aged −1)							
	Missing required parameter 1=month! (aged −1)							
	Missing required parameter 1=month! (aged −1)							
	Missing required parameter 1=month! (aged −1)							
(Germany) Malik Bourakkadi	Missing required parameter 1=month! (aged −1)							
(Germany) Leona Michalski	Missing required parameter 1=month! (aged −1)							
(Thailand) Pakkapon Teeraratsakul	Missing required parameter 1=month! (aged −1)							
(Thailand) Phataimas Muenwong	Missing required parameter 1=month! (aged −1)							
(South Korea) Lee Jong-min	27 August 2006 (aged 18)	Debut			Debut			PB
(South Korea) Chae Yoo-jung	9 May 1995 (aged 30)	Debut			5th	23	G	
(England) Callum Hemming	27 June 1999 (aged 26)	Debut			3rd	21	2R	=PB
(England) Estelle Van Leeuwen	1 November 2004 (aged 20)	Debut			Debut			PB
First rounders
(Canada) Ty Alexander Lindeman	15 August 1997 (aged 28)	2nd	23	2R	2nd	23	2R	
(Canada) Josephine Wu	20 January 1995 (aged 30)	2nd	23	2R	3rd	19, 23	2R	
	Missing required parameter 1=month! (aged −1)							
	Missing required parameter 1=month! (aged −1)							
	Missing required parameter 1=month! (aged −1)							
	Missing required parameter 1=month! (aged −1)							
	Missing required parameter 1=month! (aged −1)							
	Missing required parameter 1=month! (aged −1)							
	Missing required parameter 1=month! (aged −1)							
	Missing required parameter 1=month! (aged −1)							
	Missing required parameter 1=month! (aged −1)							
	Missing required parameter 1=month! (aged −1)							
	Missing required parameter 1=month! (aged −1)							
	Missing required parameter 1=month! (aged −1)							
	Missing required parameter 1=month! (aged −1)							
	Missing required parameter 1=month! (aged −1)							
	Missing required parameter 1=month! (aged −1)							
	Missing required parameter 1=month! (aged −1)							
	Missing required parameter 1=month! (aged −1)							
	Missing required parameter 1=month! (aged −1)							
	Missing required parameter 1=month! (aged −1)							
	Missing required parameter 1=month! (aged −1)							
	Missing required parameter 1=month! (aged −1)							
	Missing required parameter 1=month! (aged −1)							
	Missing required parameter 1=month! (aged −1)							
	Missing required parameter 1=month! (aged −1)							
	Missing required parameter 1=month! (aged −1)							
	Missing required parameter 1=month! (aged −1)							
(Scotland) Adam Pringle	31 March 2001 (aged 24)							
(Scotland) Rachel Andrew	19 January 2001 (aged 24)							
	Missing required parameter 1=month! (aged −1)							
	Missing required parameter 1=month! (aged −1)							
