= 2023 BWF World Championships – Mixed doubles =

Badminton championships

Mixed doubles at the 2023 BWF World Championships
- Venue: Royal Arena
- Location: Copenhagen, Denmark
- Dates: 21–27 August
- Competitors: 96 from 31 nations

Medalists
gold medal	Seo Seung-jae; Chae Yoo-jung	South Korea
silver medal	Zheng Siwei; Huang Yaqiong	China
bronze medal	Jiang Zhenbang; Wei Yaxin	China
bronze medal	Yuta Watanabe; Arisa Higashino	Japan

The mixed doubles tournament of the 2023 BWF World Championships took place from 21 to 27 August 2023 at the Royal Arena in Copenhagen.

== Seeds ==
The seeding list was based on the World Rankings of 1 August 2023.

1. (China) Zheng Siwei / Huang Yaqiong (final)
2. (Japan) Yuta Watanabe / Arisa Higashino (semi-finals)
3. (China) Feng Yanzhe / Huang Dongping (third round)
4. (Thailand) Dechapol Puavaranukroh / Sapsiree Taerattanachai (quarter-finals)
5. (South Korea) Seo Seung-jae / Chae Yoo-jung (champions)
6. (South Korea) Kim Won-ho / Jeong Na-eun (quarter-finals)
7. (France) Thom Gicquel / Delphine Delrue (third round)
8. (China) Jiang Zhenbang / Wei Yaxin (semi-finals)

9. (Netherlands) Robin Tabeling / Selena Piek (second round)
10. (Malaysia) Goh Soon Huat / Shevon Jemie Lai (third round)
11. (Denmark) Mathias Christiansen / Alexandra Bøje (quarter-finals)
12. (Thailand) Supak Jomkoh / Supissara Paewsampran (third round)
13. (Indonesia) Rehan Naufal Kusharjanto / Lisa Ayu Kusumawati (third round)
14. (Malaysia) Chen Tang Jie / Toh Ee Wei (quarter-finals)
15. (Japan) Kyohei Yamashita / Naru Shinoya (second round)
16. (Chinese Taipei) Ye Hong-wei / Lee Chia-hsin (third round)

Click on the seed number of a player to go to their draw section.

== Draw ==
The drawing ceremony was held on 10 August 2023.

=== Finals ===
Semi-finals
1	(China) Zheng Siwei (China) Huang Yaqiong	21	21
8	(China) Jiang Zhenbang (China) Wei Yaxin	18	16
5	(South Korea) Seo Seung-jae (South Korea) Chae Yoo-jung	21	21
2	(Japan) Yuta Watanabe (Japan) Arisa Higashino	15	13

Final
1	(China) Zheng Siwei (China) Huang Yaqiong	17	21	18
5	(South Korea) Seo Seung-jae (South Korea) Chae Yoo-jung	21	10	21

=== Top half ===
==== Section 1 ====
First round
(Netherlands) T van der Lecq (Netherlands) D Jille	17	21	18
(Germany) M Lamsfuß (Germany) I Lohau	21	12	21
(Japan) Y Kaneko (Japan) M Matsutomo	14	12
(Indonesia) D Ferdinansyah (Indonesia) G E Widjaja	21	21
(Scotland) A Hall (Scotland) J MacPherson	21	20	21
(India) R Kapoor (India) N. S Reddy	14	22	18
(United States) V Chiu (United States) J Gai	21	21
(Brazil) F Farias (Brazil) J Lima	16	10

Second round
1	(China) Zheng SW (China) Huang YQ	21	21
(Germany) M Lamsfuß (Germany) I Lohau	17	4
9	(Netherlands) R Tabeling (Netherlands) S Piek	14	13
(Indonesia) D Ferdinansyah (Indonesia) G E Widjaja	21	21
6	(South Korea) Kim W-h (South Korea) Jeong N-e	21	16	21
(Scotland) A Hall (Scotland) J MacPherson	9	21	15
16	(Chinese Taipei) Ye H-w (Chinese Taipei) Lee C-h	21	21
(United States) V Chiu (United States) J Gai	18	15

Third round
1	(China) Zheng SW (China) Huang YQ	21	21
(Indonesia) D Ferdinansyah (Indonesia) G E Widjaja	14	9
6	(South Korea) Kim W-h (South Korea) Jeong N-e	18	22	21
16	(Chinese Taipei) Ye H-w (Chinese Taipei) Lee C-h	21	20	17

Quarter-finals
1	(China) Zheng SW (China) Huang YQ	21	21
6	(South Korea) Kim W-h (South Korea) Jeong N-e	10	6

==== Section 2 ====
First round
(England) G Mairs (England) J Mairs	21	21
(Serbia) M Tomić (Serbia) A Vitman	13	14
(Canada) N Yakura (Canada) C Lai	10	21	17
(Chinese Taipei) Yang P-hs (Chinese Taipei) Hu L-f	21	19	21
(Egypt) A H Elgamal (Egypt) D Hany	17	16
(Israel) M Zilberman (Israel) S Zilberman	21	21
(Bulgaria) I Stoynov (Bulgaria) H Popovska	21	20	21
(Guatemala) J Solís (Guatemala) D Corleto	19	22	12

Second round
3	(China) Feng YZ (China) Huang DP	21	21
(England) G Mairs (England) J Mairs	12	13
11	(Denmark) M Christiansen (Denmark) A Bøje	19	21	21
(Chinese Taipei) Yang P-hs (Chinese Taipei) Hu L-f	21	18	10
8	(China) Jiang ZB (China) Wei YX	21	21
(Israel) M Zilberman (Israel) S Zilberman	11	13
10	(Malaysia) Goh S H (Malaysia) S J Lai	21	21
(Bulgaria) I Stoynov (Bulgaria) H Popovska	11	8

Third round
3	(China) Feng YZ (China) Huang DP	15	18
11	(Denmark) M Christiansen (Denmark) A Bøje	21	21
8	(China) Jiang ZB (China) Wei YX	21	21
10	(Malaysia) Goh S H (Malaysia) S J Lai	16	18

Quarter-finals
11	(Denmark) M Christiansen (Denmark) A Bøje	16	18
8	(China) Jiang ZB (China) Wei YX	21	21

=== Bottom half ===
==== Section 3 ====
First round
(Maldives) H Shaheed (Maldives) F N Abdul Razzaq	4	6
(Malaysia) Tan K M (Malaysia) Lai P J	21	21
(Singapore) T Hee (Singapore) J Tan	21	21
(Denmark) M Thyrri (Denmark) A Magelund	12	18
(Japan) H Midorikawa (Japan) N Saito	21	21	11
(Indonesia) R Rivaldy (Indonesia) P H Mentari	23	8	21
(Hong Kong) Tang C M (Hong Kong) Tse Y S	21	21
(Philippines) A Morada (Philippines) A Leonardo	10	12

Second round
(Malaysia) Tan K M (Malaysia) Lai P J	15	18
12	(Thailand) S Jomkoh (Thailand) S Paewsampran	21	21
(Singapore) T Hee (Singapore) J Tan	17	8
5	(South Korea) Seo S-j (South Korea) Chae Y-j	21	21
(Indonesia) R Rivaldy (Indonesia) P H Mentari	21	14	21
15	(Japan) K Yamashita (Japan) N Shinoya	15	21	14
(Hong Kong) Tang C M (Hong Kong) Tse Y S	13	14
4	(Thailand) D Puavaranukroh (Thailand) S Taerattanachai	21	21

Third round
12	(Thailand) S Jomkoh (Thailand) S Paewsampran	10	21	16
5	(South Korea) Seo S-j (South Korea) Chae Y-j	21	15	21
(Indonesia) R Rivaldy (Indonesia) P H Mentari	12	19
4	(Thailand) D Puavaranukroh (Thailand) S Taerattanachai	21	21

Quarter-finals
5	(South Korea) Seo S-j (South Korea) Chae Y-j	21	21
4	(Thailand) D Puavaranukroh (Thailand) S Taerattanachai	12	16

==== Section 4 ====
First round
(Brazil) D Silva (Brazil) S Lima	22	19	7
(Hong Kong) Lee C H (Hong Kong) Ng T Y	20	21	21
(Australia) K Choo (Australia) G Somerville	24	15	14
(England) M Ellis (England) L Smith	22	21	21
(Germany) J R Jansen (Germany) L Efler	21	21
(India) V G Prasad (India) J Dewangan	12	11
(Austria) P Birker (Austria) K Hochmeir	14	17
(Canada) T A Lindeman (Canada) J Wu	21	21

Second round
(Hong Kong) Lee C H (Hong Kong) Ng T Y	19	9
14	(Malaysia) Chen T J (Malaysia) Toh E W	21	21
(England) M Ellis (England) L Smith	18	13
7	(France) T Gicquel (France) D Delrue	21	21
(Germany) J R Jansen (Germany) L Efler	9	12
13	(Indonesia) R N Kusharjanto (Indonesia) L A Kusumawati	21	21
(Canada) T A Lindeman (Canada) J Wu	12	15
2	(Japan) Y Watanabe (Japan) A Higashino	21	21

Third round
14	(Malaysia) Chen T J (Malaysia) Toh E W	20	21	21
7	(France) T Gicquel (France) D Delrue	22	19	12
13	(Indonesia) R N Kusharjanto (Indonesia) L A Kusumawati	14	17
2	(Japan) Y Watanabe (Japan) A Higashino	21	21

Quarter-finals
14	(Malaysia) Chen T J (Malaysia) Toh E W	11	11
2	(Japan) Y Watanabe (Japan) A Higashino	21	21

== Qualifiers' performances ==
The table below lists out all the qualifiers of this edition by 22 July 2023.

Pair	Date of birth	Pair statistics			Individual statistics			Note
Pair	Date of birth	Appearance	Best Performance(s)		Appearance	Best Performance(s)		Note
Pair	Date of birth	Appearance	Edition(s)	Result	Appearance	Edition(s)	Result	Note
Champions
(South Korea) Seo Seung-jae	14 September 1997 (aged 25)	3rd	19, 22	QF	3rd	19, 22	QF	PB
(South Korea) Chae Yoo-jung	9 May 1995 (aged 28)	3rd	19, 22	QF	4th	19, 22	QF	PB
Finalist
(China) Zheng Siwei	26 February 1997 (aged 26)	5th	18, 19, 22	G	6th	18, 19, 22	G	Reigning world champion
(China) Huang Yaqiong	28 February 1994 (aged 29)	5th	18, 19, 22	G	8th	18, 19, 22	G	Reigning world champion
Semi-finalist
(China) Jiang Zhenbang	28 May 2001 (aged 22)	Debut			Debut			Reigning Asian champion, PB
(China) Wei Yaxin	18 April 2000 (aged 23)	Debut			Debut			Reigning Asian champion, PB
(Japan) Yuta Watanabe	13 June 1997 (aged 26)	6th	21, 22	S	6th	21, 22	S	Most participated pair
(Japan) Arisa Higashino	1 August 1996 (aged 27)	6th	21, 22	S	6th	21, 22	S	Most participated pair
Quarter-finalist
(Denmark) Mathias Christiansen	20 February 1994 (aged 29)	3rd	21	3R	5th	18	QF	=PB
(Denmark) Alexandra Bøje	6 December 1999 (aged 23)	3rd	21	3R	3rd	21	3R	PB
(Malaysia) Chen Tang Jie	5 January 1998 (aged 25)	Debut			2nd	22	2R	PB
(Malaysia) Toh Ee Wei	18 September 2000 (aged 22)	Debut			Debut			PB
(South Korea) Kim Won-ho	2 June 1999 (aged 24)	Debut			Debut			PB
(South Korea) Jeong Na-eun	27 June 2000 (aged 23)	Debut			Debut			PB
(Thailand) Dechapol Puavaranukroh	20 May 1997 (aged 26)	5th	21	G	5th	21	G	
(Thailand) Sapsiree Taerattanachai	18 April 1992 (aged 31)	5th	21	G	6th	21	G	
Third rounders
(China) Feng Yanzhe	13 February 2001 (aged 22)	Debut			Debut			PB
(China) Huang Dongping	20 January 1995 (aged 28)	Debut			5th	18	S	Reigning Olympic champion
(Chinese Taipei) Ye Hong-wei	1 November 1999 (aged 23)	Debut			Debut			PB
(Chinese Taipei) Lee Chia-hsin	11 May 1997 (aged 26)	Debut			2nd	18	3R	=PB
(France) Thom Gicquel	12 January 1999 (aged 24)	6th	21, 22	3R	6th	21, 22	3R	Most participated pair, =PB
(France) Delphine Delrue	6 November 1998 (aged 24)	6th	21, 22	3R	6th	21, 22	3R	Most participated pair, =PB
(Indonesia) Dejan Ferdinansyah	21 January 2001 (aged 22)	Debut			2nd	21	2R	PB
(Indonesia) Gloria Emanuelle Widjaja	28 November 1993 (aged 29)	Debut			4th	15, 18, 19	3R	=PB
(Indonesia) Rehan Naufal Kusharjanto	28 February 2000 (aged 23)	2nd	22	3R	2nd	22	3R	=PB
(Indonesia) Lisa Ayu Kusumawati	15 January 2000 (aged 23)	2nd	22	3R	2nd	22	3R	=PB
(Indonesia) Rinov Rivaldy	12 November 1999 (aged 23)	3rd	22	3R	3rd	22	3R	=PB
(Indonesia) Pitha Haningtyas Mentari	1 July 1999 (aged 24)	3rd	22	3R	3rd	22	3R	=PB
(Malaysia) Goh Soon Huat	27 June 1990 (aged 33)	5th	21, 22	QF	5th	21, 22	QF	
(Malaysia) Shevon Jemie Lai	8 August 1993 (aged 30)	5th	21, 22	QF	6th	21, 22	QF	
(Thailand) Supak Jomkoh	4 September 1996 (aged 26)	3rd	21	3R	3rd	21	3R	=PB
(Thailand) Supissara Paewsampran	18 November 1999 (aged 23)	3rd	21	3R	3rd	21	3R	=PB
Second rounders
(Bulgaria) Iliyan Stoynov	25 January 2001 (aged 22)	Debut			Debut			PB
(Bulgaria) Hristomira Popovska	5 September 2000 (aged 22)	Debut			Debut			PB
(Canada) Ty Alexander Lindeman	15 August 1997 (aged 26)	Debut			Debut			PB
(Canada) Josephine Wu	20 January 1995 (aged 28)	Debut			2nd	19	2R	=PB
(Chinese Taipei) Yang Po-hsuan	23 August 1996 (aged 26)	2nd	22	2R	2nd	22	2R	=PB
(Chinese Taipei) Hu Ling-fang	4 June 1998 (aged 25)	2nd	22	2R	3rd	17, 22	2R	=PB
(England) Marcus Ellis	14 September 1989 (aged 33)	4th	18, 19	3R	5th	18, 19	3R	
(England) Lauren Smith	26 September 1991 (aged 31)	4th	18, 19	3R	4th	18, 19	3R	
(England) Gregory Mairs	7 November 1994 (aged 28)	3rd	22	2R	3rd	22	2R	=PB
(England) Jenny Moore	31 August 1995 (aged 27)	3rd	22	2R	3rd	22	2R	=PB
(Germany) Jones Ralfy Jansen	12 November 1992 (aged 30)	2nd	22	1R	2nd	22	1R	PB
(Germany) Linda Efler	23 January 1995 (aged 28)	2nd	22	1R	4th	18	2R	=PB
(Germany) Mark Lamsfuß	19 April 1994 (aged 29)	5th	22	B	5th	22	B	
(Germany) Isabel Lohau	17 March 1992 (aged 31)	5th	22	B	7th	22	B	
(Hong Kong) Lee Chun Hei	25 January 1994 (aged 29)	Debut			6th	17	B	
(Hong Kong) Ng Tsz Yau	24 April 1998 (aged 25)	Debut			3rd	21	3R	
(Hong Kong) Tang Chun Man	20 March 1995 (aged 28)	6th	18, 21	B	6th	18, 21	B	Most participated pair
(Hong Kong) Tse Ying Suet	9 November 1991 (aged 31)	6th	18, 21	B	10th	18, 21	B	Most participated pair and qualifier
(Israel) Misha Zilberman	25 January 1989 (aged 34)	5th	09, 22	2R	5th	09, 22	2R	=PB
(Israel) Svetlana Zilberman	10 May 1958 (aged 65)	5th	09, 22	2R	5th	09, 22	2R	Oldest qualifier, =PB
(Japan) Kyohei Yamashita	12 October 1998 (aged 24)	3rd	21	B	3rd	21	B	
(Japan) Naru Shinoya	18 March 1994 (aged 29)	3rd	21	B	3rd	21	B	
(Malaysia) Tan Kian Meng	1 June 1994 (aged 29)	6th	22	QF	6th	22	QF	Most participated pair
(Malaysia) Lai Pei Jing	8 August 1992 (aged 31)	6th	22	QF	9th	22	QF	Most participated pair
(Netherlands) Robin Tabeling	24 April 1994 (aged 29)	4th	19	QF	6th	19	QF	Reigning European champion
(Netherlands) Selena Piek	30 September 1991 (aged 31)	4th	19	QF	9th	15, 19	QF	Reigning European champion
(Scotland) Adam Hall	12 February 1996 (aged 27)	4th	21	2R	4th	21	2R	=PB
(Scotland) Julie MacPherson	17 November 1997 (aged 25)	4th	21	2R	5th	21	2R	=PB
(Singapore) Terry Hee	6 July 1995 (aged 28)	2nd	22	3R	2nd	22	3R	
(Singapore) Jessica Tan	16 July 1993 (aged 30)	2nd	22	3R	3rd	22	3R	
(United States) Vinson Chiu	8 August 1998 (aged 25)	2nd	22	1R	2nd	22	1R	PB
(United States) Jennie Gai	25 February 2001 (aged 22)	2nd	22	1R	2nd	22	1R	PB
First rounders
(Australia) Kenneth Choo	1 April 1997 (aged 26)	Debut			Debut			Reigning Oceania champion, PB
(Australia) Gronya Somerville	10 May 1995 (aged 28)	Debut			4th	19	2R	Reigning Oceania champion
(Austria) Philip Birker	8 May 1998 (aged 25)	3rd	21, 22	1R	3rd	21, 22	1R	=PB
(Austria) Kathartina Hochmeir	21 June 1998 (aged 25)	3rd	21, 22	1R	3rd	21, 22	1R	=PB
(Brazil) Fabrício Farias	8 May 2000 (aged 23)	3rd	22	2R	3rd	22	2R	
(Brazil) Jaqueline Lima	23 April 2001 (aged 22)	3rd	22	2R	3rd	22	2R	
(Brazil) Davi Silva	15 June 2003 (aged 20)	Debut			Debut			PB
(Brazil) Sânia Lima	26 August 2002 (aged 20)	Debut			Debut			PB
(Canada) Nyl Yakura	14 February 1993 (aged 30)	Debut			3rd	15, 19	1R	=PB
(Canada) Crystal Lai	25 September 2001 (aged 21)	Debut			Debut			PB
(Denmark) Mathias Thyrri	29 August 1997 (aged 25)	Debut			2nd	21	3R	
(Denmark) Amalie Magelund	13 May 2000 (aged 23)	Debut			3rd	19	2R	
(Egypt) Adham Hatem Elgamal	4 February 1998 (aged 25)	2nd	22	1R	2nd	22	1R	=PB
(Egypt) Doha Hany	10 September 1997 (aged 25)	2nd	22	1R	2nd	22	1R	=PB
(Guatemala) Jonathan Solís	21 August 1993 (aged 30)	2nd	22	1R	2nd	22	1R	=PB
(Guatemala) Diana Corleto	18 December 2000 (aged 22)	2nd	22	1R	2nd	22	1R	=PB
(India) Rohan Kapoor	16 September 1997 (aged 25)	Debut			2nd	18	2R	
(India) N. Sikki Reddy	18 August 1993 (aged 30)	Debut			6th	17, 21	3R	
(India) Venkat Gaurav Prasad	29 November 1985 (aged 37)	3rd	21, 22	1R	3rd	21, 22	1R	=PB
(India) Juhi Dewangan	25 May 1994 (aged 29)	3rd	21, 22	1R	3rd	21, 22	1R	=PB
(Japan) Yuki Kaneko	22 July 1994 (aged 29)	4th	21	QF	4th	21	QF	
(Japan) Misaki Matsutomo	8 February 1992 (aged 31)	4th	21	QF	7th	13, 21	QF	
(Japan) Hiroki Midorikawa	17 May 2000 (aged 23)	2nd	22	2R	2nd	22	2R	
(Japan) Natsu Saito	9 June 2000 (aged 23)	2nd	22	2R	2nd	22	2R	
(Maldives) Hussein Shaheed	30 May 1993 (aged 30)	Debut			Debut			PB
(Maldives) Fathimath Nabaaha Abdul Razzaq	13 June 1999 (aged 24)	Debut			Debut			PB
(Netherlands) Ties van der Lecq	10 March 2000 (aged 23)	3rd	22	2R	3rd	22	2R	
(Netherlands) Debora Jille	11 September 1999 (aged 23)	3rd	22	2R	3rd	22	2R	
(Philippines) Alvin Morada	25 July 1998 (aged 25)	Debut			Debut			PB
(Philippines) Alyssa Leonardo	15 September 1997 (aged 25)	Debut			Debut			PB
(Serbia) Mihajlo Tomić	17 February 2003 (aged 20)	Debut			Debut			PB
(Serbia) Anđela Vitman	3 May 2005 (aged 18)	Debut			Debut			Youngest qualifier, PB
