= 2022 BWF World Championships – Mixed doubles =

Badminton championships

Mixed doubles at the 2022 BWF World Championships
- Venue: Tokyo Metropolitan Gymnasium
- Location: Tokyo, Japan
- Dates: 22–28 August
- Competitors: 46 from 24 nations

Medalists
gold medal	Zheng Siwei; Huang Yaqiong	China
silver medal	Yuta Watanabe; Arisa Higashino	Japan
bronze medal	Wang Yilyu; Huang Dongping	China
bronze medal	Mark Lamsfuß; Isabel Lohau	Germany

The mixed doubles tournament of the 2022 BWF World Championships took place from 22 to 28 August 2022 at the Tokyo Metropolitan Gymnasium in Tokyo.

== Seeds ==
The seeding list was based on the World Rankings of 9 August 2022.

1. (China) Zheng Siwei / Huang Yaqiong (champions)
2. (Thailand) Dechapol Puavaranukroh / Sapsiree Taerattanachai (third round)
3. (Japan) Yuta Watanabe / Arisa Higashino (final)
4. (China) Wang Yilyu / Huang Dongping (semi-finals)
5. (South Korea) Seo Seung-jae / Chae Yoo-jung (quarter-finals)
6. (Hong Kong) Tang Chun Man / Tse Ying Suet (quarter-finals)
7. (France) Thom Gicquel / Delphine Delrue (third round)
8. (Malaysia) Tan Kian Meng / Lai Pei Jing (quarter-finals)

9. (Germany) Mark Lamsfuß / Isabel Lohau (semi-finals)
10. (Denmark) Mathias Christiansen / Alexandra Bøje (second round)
11. (Malaysia) Goh Soon Huat / Shevon Jemie Lai (quarter-finals)
12. (Japan) Yuki Kaneko / Misaki Matsutomo (second round)
13. (Indonesia) Rinov Rivaldy / Pitha Haningtyas Mentari (third round)
14. (Thailand) Supak Jomkoh / Supissara Paewsampran (third round)
15. (Netherlands) Robin Tabeling / Selena Piek (third round)
16. (Hong Kong) Chang Tak Ching / Ng Wing Yung (second round)

Click on the seed number of a player to go to their draw section.

== Draw ==
=== Finals ===
Semi-finals
1	(China) Zheng Siwei (China) Huang Yaqiong	21	12	21
4	(China) Wang Yilyu (China) Huang Dongping	16	21	10
3	(Japan) Yuta Watanabe (Japan) Arisa Higashino	21	21
9	(Germany) Mark Lamsfuß (Germany) Isabel Lohau	8	6

Final
1	(China) Zheng Siwei (China) Huang Yaqiong	21	21
3	(Japan) Yuta Watanabe (Japan) Arisa Higashino	13	16

=== Top half ===
==== Section 1 ====
First Round
(Netherlands) T van der Lecq (Netherlands) D Jille	17	21	21
(Guatemala) J Solís (Guatemala) D Corleto	21	10	10
(Germany) P Scheiel (Germany) F Volkmann	12	13
(India) I Bhatnagar (India) T Crasto	21	21
(Israel) M Zilberman (Israel) S Zilberman	16	21	21
(Egypt) A H Elgamal (Egypt) D Hany	21	18	11
(France) W Villeger (France) A Tran	13	17
(Japan) K Yamashita (Japan) N Shinoya	21	21

Second Round
1	(China) Zheng SW (China) Huang YQ	21	21
(Netherlands) T van der Lecq (Netherlands) D Jille	11	12
14	(Thailand) S Jomkoh (Thailand) S Paewsampran	21	21
(India) I Bhatnagar (India) T Crasto	14	17
8	(Malaysia) Tan K M (Malaysia) Lai P J	21	21
(Israel) M Zilberman (Israel) S Zilberman	6	5
10	(Denmark) M Christiansen (Denmark) A Bøje	13	18
(Japan) K Yamashita (Japan) N Shinoya	21	21

Third Round
1	(China) Zheng SW (China) Huang YQ	21	19	21
14	(Thailand) S Jomkoh (Thailand) S Paewsampran	9	21	19
8	(Malaysia) Tan K M (Malaysia) Lai P J	21	21
(Japan) K Yamashita (Japan) N Shinoya	12	14

Quarter-finals
1	(China) Zheng SW (China) Huang YQ	21	21
8	(Malaysia) Tan K M (Malaysia) Lai P J	9	9

==== Section 2 ====
First Round
(United States) M Fogarty (United States) I Zhong	8	2^{r}
(Malaysia) Chen T J (Malaysia) Peck Y W	21	19
(Sri Lanka) S Dias (Sri Lanka) T Hendahewa
(Chinese Taipei) Lee Y (Chinese Taipei) Yang C-t	w	/	o
(Finland) A Kaisti (Czech Republic) A Bášová	21	13	16
(Brazil) Fa Farias (Brazil) J Lima	15	21	21
(Indonesia) R N Kusharjanto (Indonesia) L A Kusumawati	21	21
(Chinese Taipei) Lee J-h (Chinese Taipei) Hsu Y-c	14	9

Second Round
4	(China) Wang YL (China) Huang DP	21	12	21
(Malaysia) Chen T J (Malaysia) Peck Y W	14	21	11
13	(Indonesia) R Rivaldy (Indonesia) P H Mentari	21	19	21
(Chinese Taipei) Lee Y (Chinese Taipei) Yang C-t	15	21	8
5	(South Korea) Seo S-j (South Korea) Chae Y-j	21	21
(Brazil) Fa Farias (Brazil) J Lima	13	10
16	(Hong Kong) Chang T C (Hong Kong) Ng W Y	14	15
(Indonesia) R N Kusharjanto (Indonesia) L A Kusumawati	21	21

Third Round
4	(China) Wang YL (China) Huang DP	21	21
13	(Indonesia) R Rivaldy (Indonesia) P H Mentari	16	14
5	(South Korea) Seo S-j (South Korea) Chae Y-j	23	21
(Indonesia) R N Kusharjanto (Indonesia) L A Kusumawati	21	12

Quarter-finals
4	(China) Wang YL (China) Huang DP	21	21
5	(South Korea) Seo S-j (South Korea) Chae Y-j	16	15

=== Bottom half ===
==== Section 3 ====
First Round
(India) V G Prasad (India) J Dewangan	10	21
(England) G Mairs (England) J Moore	21	23
(Chinese Taipei) Yang P-hs (Chinese Taipei) Hu L-f	21	21
(Scotland) A Hall (Scotland) J MacPherson	13	16
(Indonesia) Z J Sumanti (Indonesia) H Julimarbela	21	16	22
(Denmark) M Mikkelsen (Denmark) R Søby Hansen	17	21	20
(Scotland) A Dunn (Scotland) C Torrance	21	21
(Austria) P Birker (Austria) K Hochmeir	9	12

Second Round
(England) G Mairs (England) J Moore	13	18
11	(Malaysia) Goh S H (Malaysia) S J Lai	21	21
(Chinese Taipei) Yang P-hs (Chinese Taipei) Hu L-f	21	23	16
7	(France) T Gicquel (France) D Delrue	10	25	21
(Indonesia) Z J Sumanti (Indonesia) H Julimarbela	19	16
15	(Netherlands) R Tabeling (Netherlands) S Piek	21	21
(Scotland) A Dunn (Scotland) C Torrance	12	7
3	(Japan) Y Watanabe (Japan) A Higashino	21	21

Third Round
11	(Malaysia) Goh S H (Malaysia) S J Lai	21	21
7	(France) T Gicquel (France) D Delrue	16	4
15	(Netherlands) R Tabeling (Netherlands) S Piek	12	19
3	(Japan) Y Watanabe (Japan) A Higashino	21	21

Quarter-finals
11	(Malaysia) Goh S H (Malaysia) S J Lai	17	13
3	(Japan) Y Watanabe (Japan) A Higashino	21	21

==== Section 4 ====
First Round
(Singapore) T Hee (Singapore) Tan W H	w	/	o
(England) C Hemming (England) J Pugh
(China) Guo XW (China) Zhang SX	21	21
(United States) V Chiu (United States) J Gai	14	14
(Japan) H Midorikawa (Japan) N Saito	21	21
(France) F Delrue (France) V Hériau	14	13
(South Korea) Choi S-g (South Korea) Shin S-c	21	21
(Germany) J R Jansen (Germany) L Efler	19	12

Second Round
(Singapore) T Hee (Singapore) Tan W H	19	21	21
12	(Japan) Y Kaneko (Japan) M Matsutomo	21	11	17
(China) Guo XW (China) Zhang SX	16	11
6	(Hong Kong) Tang C M (Hong Kong) Tse Y S	21	21
(Japan) H Midorikawa (Japan) N Saito	21	13	18
9	(Germany) M Lamsfuß (Germany) I Lohau	15	21	21
(South Korea) Choi S-g (South Korea) Shin S-c	11	18
2	(Thailand) D Puavaranukroh (Thailand) S Taerattanachai	21	21

Third Round
(Singapore) T Hee (Singapore) Tan W H	10	15
6	(Hong Kong) Tang C M (Hong Kong) Tse Y S	21	21
9	(Germany) M Lamsfuß (Germany) I Lohau	21	21
2	(Thailand) D Puavaranukroh (Thailand) S Taerattanachai	16	14

Quarter-finals
6	(Hong Kong) Tang C M (Hong Kong) Tse Y S	13	21	19
9	(Germany) M Lamsfuß (Germany) I Lohau	21	13	21
