= 2019 BWF World Championships – Mixed doubles =

Mixed doubles at the 2019 BWF World Championships
- Venue: St. Jakobshalle
- Location: Basel, Switzerland
- Dates: 19–25 August

Medalists
gold medal	Zheng Siwei; Huang Yaqiong	China
silver medal	Dechapol Puavaranukroh; Sapsiree Taerattanachai	Thailand
bronze medal	Yuta Watanabe; Arisa Higashino	Japan
bronze medal	Wang Yilyu; Huang Dongping	China

The mixed doubles tournament of the 2019 BWF World Championships (World Badminton Championships) takes place from 19 to 25 August.

== Seeds ==
The seeding list is based on the World Rankings from 30 July 2019.

1. (China) Zheng Siwei / Huang Yaqiong (champions)
2. (China) Wang Yilyu / Huang Dongping (semifinals)
3. (Japan) Yuta Watanabe / Arisa Higashino (semifinals)
4. (Thailand) Dechapol Puavaranukroh / Sapsiree Taerattanachai (final)
5. (Malaysia) Chan Peng Soon / Goh Liu Ying (quarterfinals)
6. (Indonesia) Praveen Jordan / Melati Daeva Oktavianti (third round)
7. (South Korea) Seo Seung-jae / Chae Yoo-jung (quarterfinals)
8. (England) Marcus Ellis / Lauren Smith (third round)

9. (Hong Kong) Tang Chun Man / Tse Ying Suet (quarterfinals)
10. (Indonesia) Hafiz Faizal / Gloria Emanuelle Widjaja (third round)
11. (England) Chris Adcock / Gabby Adcock (third round)
12. (Malaysia) Goh Soon Huat / Shevon Jemie Lai (second round)
13. (China) He Jiting / Du Yue (second round)
14. (Malaysia) Tan Kian Meng / Lai Pei Jing (third round)
15. (Thailand) Nipitphon Phuangphuapet / Savitree Amitrapai (third round)
16. (China) Lu Kai / Chen Lu (third round)

Click on the seed number of a player to go to their draw section.

== Draw ==
=== Finals ===
Semifinals
1	(China) Zheng Siwei (China) Huang Yaqiong	21	21
3	(Japan) Yuta Watanabe (Japan) Arisa Higashino	11	15
4	(Thailand) Dechapol Puavaranukroh (Thailand) Sapsiree Taerattanachai	21	21
2	(China) Wang Yilyu (China) Huang Dongping	16	16

Final
1	(China) Zheng Siwei (China) Huang Yaqiong	21	21
4	(Thailand) Dechapol Puavaranukroh (Thailand) Sapsiree Taerattanachai	8	12

=== Top half ===
==== Section 1 ====
First Round
(Germany) M Lamsfuß (Germany) I Herttrich	21	21
(Switzerland) O Schaller (Switzerland) C Burkart	15	17
(United States) M Fogarty (United States) I Zhong	9	10
(Ukraine) V Atrashchenkov (Ukraine) Y Zharka	21	21
(Chinese Taipei) Wang C-l (Chinese Taipei) Cheng C-y	21	21
(Japan) K Gondo (Japan) A Kurihara	18	11
(Bulgaria) A Vlaar (Bulgaria) M Mitsova	21	21
(Israel) M Zilberman (Israel) S Zilberman	14	16

Second Round
1	(China) Zheng SW (China) Huang YQ	21	17	21
(Germany) M Lamsfuß (Germany) I Herttrich	10	21	11
10	(Indonesia) H Faizal (Indonesia) G E Widjaja	21	21
(Ukraine) V Atrashchenkov (Ukraine) Y Zharka	9	15
7	(South Korea) Seo S-j (South Korea) Chae Y-j	21	21
(Chinese Taipei) Wang C-l (Chinese Taipei) Cheng C-y	17	13
15	(Thailand) N Phuangphuapet (Thailand) S Amitrapai	21	21
(Bulgaria) A Vlaar (Bulgaria) M Mitsova	10	13

Third Round
1	(China) Zheng SW (China) Huang YQ	21	21
10	(Indonesia) H Faizal (Indonesia) G E Widjaja	17	12
7	(South Korea) Seo S-j (South Korea) Chae Y-j	21	21
15	(Thailand) N Phuangphuapet (Thailand) S Amitrapai	17	6

Quarterfinals
1	(China) Zheng SW (China) Huang YQ	23	21
7	(South Korea) Seo S-j (South Korea) Chae Y-j	21	10

==== Section 2 ====
First Round
(Germany) M Seidel (Germany) L Efler	19	14
(Indonesia) R Rivaldy (Indonesia) P H Mentari	21	21
(Vietnam) Đỗ T Đ (Vietnam) Phạm N T	21	21
(Poland) P Śmiłowski (Poland) M Świerczyńska	12	13
(Republic of Ireland) S Magee (Republic of Ireland) C Magee	17	13
(Canada) J Hurlburt-Yu (Canada) J Wu	21	21
(Japan) T Hoki (Japan) W Nagahara	21	21
(Scotland) A Hall (Scotland) J MacPherson	13	17

Second Round
3	(Japan) Y Watanabe (Japan) A Higashino	21	19	21
(Indonesia) R Rivaldy (Indonesia) P H Mentari	13	21	16
11	(England) C Adcock (England) G Adcock	21	21
(Vietnam) Đỗ T Đ (Vietnam) Phạm N T	19	10
5	(Malaysia) Chan P S (Malaysia) Goh L Y	21	19	21
(Canada) J Hurlburt-Yu (Canada) J Wu	18	21	16
12	(Malaysia) Goh S H (Malaysia) S J Lai	21	25	16
(Japan) T Hoki (Japan) W Nagahara	19	27	21

Third Round
3	(Japan) Y Watanabe (Japan) A Higashino	21	21
11	(England) C Adcock (England) G Adcock	13	11
5	(Malaysia) Chan P S (Malaysia) Goh L Y	17	21	21
(Japan) T Hoki (Japan) W Nagahara	21	13	14

Quarterfinals
3	(Japan) Y Watanabe (Japan) A Higashino	18	21	21
5	(Malaysia) Chan P S (Malaysia) Goh L Y	21	12	11

=== Bottom half ===
==== Section 3 ====
First Round
(Indonesia) R Alexander (Indonesia) A Saufika	14	13
(Netherlands) R Tabeling (Netherlands) S Piek	21	21
(Czech Republic) J Bitman (Czech Republic) A Bášová	21	21
(Canada) N Yakura (Canada) K Tsai	19	9
(England) B Lane (England) J Pugh	w	/	o
(India) P Chopra (India) N. S Reddy
(Russia) R Alimov (Russia) A Davletova	21	21
(Singapore) D B Chrisnanta (Singapore) Tan W H	16	13

Second Round
(Netherlands) R Tabeling (Netherlands) S Piek	22	21
13	(China) He JT (China) Du Y	20	18
(Czech Republic) J Bitman (Czech Republic) A Bášová	16	11
6	(Indonesia) P Jordan (Indonesia) M D Oktavianti	21	21
(England) B Lane (England) J Pugh	19	19
14	(Malaysia) Tan K M (Malaysia) Lai P J	21	21
(Russia) R Alimov (Russia) A Davletova	12	9
4	(Thailand) D Puavaranukroh (Thailand) S Taerattanachai	21	21

Third Round
(Netherlands) R Tabeling (Netherlands) S Piek	21	21	21
6	(Indonesia) P Jordan (Indonesia) M D Oktavianti	13	23	8
14	(Malaysia) Tan K M (Malaysia) Lai P J	17	7
4	(Thailand) D Puavaranukroh (Thailand) S Taerattanachai	21	21

Quarterfinals
(Netherlands) R Tabeling (Netherlands) S Piek	11	7
4	(Thailand) D Puavaranukroh (Thailand) S Taerattanachai	21	21

==== Section 4 ====
First Round
(Japan) Y Kaneko (Japan) M Matsutomo	21	21
(Jordan) B A Alshannik (Jordan) D Amro	14	6
(Hong Kong) Chang T C (Hong Kong) Ng W Y	9	21	21
(Denmark) N Nøhr (Denmark) S Thygesen	21	17	17
(Russia) E Dremin (Russia) E Dimova	12	21	12
(Australia) S Leung (Australia) G Somerville	21	8	21
(France) T Gicquel (France) D Delrue	w	/	o
(India) S Rankireddy (India) A Ponnappa

Second Round
(Japan) Y Kaneko (Japan) M Matsutomo	10	19
9	(Hong Kong) Tang C M (Hong Kong) Tse Y S	21	21
(Hong Kong) Chang T C (Hong Kong) Ng W Y	14	25	17
8	(England) M Ellis (England) L Smith	21	23	21
(Australia) S Leung (Australia) G Somerville	11	8
16	(China) Lu K (China) Chen L	21	21
(France) T Gicquel (France) D Delrue	5	15
2	(China) Wang YL (China) Huang DP	21	21

Third Round
9	(Hong Kong) Tang C M (Hong Kong) Tse Y S	21	21
8	(England) M Ellis (England) L Smith	14	14
16	(China) Lu K (China) Chen L	9	19
2	(China) Wang YL (China) Huang DP	21	21

Quarterfinals
9	(Hong Kong) Tang C M (Hong Kong) Tse Y S	19	18
2	(China) Wang YL (China) Huang DP	21	21
