= 2021 BWF World Championships =

2021 Badminton tournament in Spain

Tournament details
- Dates: 12–19 December
- Edition: 26th
- Level: International
- Competitors: 322 from 49 nations
- Venue: Palacio de los Deportes Carolina Marín
- Location: Huelva, Spain
- Official website: bwfworldchampionships.com

The 2021 BWF World Championships (officially known as the TotalEnergies BWF World Championships 2021 for sponsorship reasons) was a badminton tournament which took place from 12 to 19 December 2021 at Palacio de los Deportes Carolina Marín in Huelva, Spain.

== Host city selection ==
Huelva was awarded the event in November 2018 during the announcement of 18 major badminton event hosts from 2019 to 2025.

== Schedule ==
Five events were held.

All times are local (UTC+1).

== Medal summary ==
=== Medal table ===
2021 BWF World Championships medal table
Rank	Nation	Gold	Silver	Bronze	Total
1	Japan	2	1	2	5
2	China	1	1	2	4
3	Singapore	1	0	0	1
3	Thailand	1	0	0	1
5	India	0	1	1	2
5	South Korea	0	1	1	2
7	Chinese Taipei	0	1	0	1
8	Denmark	0	0	2	2
9	Hong Kong	0	0	1	1
9	Malaysia	0	0	1	1
Totals (10 entries)		5	5	10	20

=== Medalists ===
Event	Gold	Silver	Bronze
Men's singles	Loh Kean Yew; Singapore	Srikanth Kidambi; India	Lakshya Sen; India
Men's singles	Loh Kean Yew; Singapore	Srikanth Kidambi; India	Anders Antonsen; Denmark
Women's singles	Akane Yamaguchi; Japan	Tai Tzu-ying; Chinese Taipei	He Bingjiao; China
Women's singles	Akane Yamaguchi; Japan	Tai Tzu-ying; Chinese Taipei	Zhang Yiman; China
Men's doubles	Japan; Takuro Hoki; Yugo Kobayashi	China; He Jiting; Tan Qiang	Malaysia; Ong Yew Sin; Teo Ee Yi
Men's doubles	Japan; Takuro Hoki; Yugo Kobayashi	China; He Jiting; Tan Qiang	Denmark; Kim Astrup; Anders Skaarup Rasmussen
Women's doubles	China; Chen Qingchen; Jia Yifan	South Korea; Lee So-hee; Shin Seung-chan	Japan; Mayu Matsumoto; Wakana Nagahara
Women's doubles	China; Chen Qingchen; Jia Yifan	South Korea; Lee So-hee; Shin Seung-chan	South Korea; Kim So-yeong; Kong Hee-yong
Mixed doubles	Thailand; Dechapol Puavaranukroh; Sapsiree Taerattanachai	Japan; Yuta Watanabe; Arisa Higashino	Japan; Kyohei Yamashita; Naru Shinoya
Mixed doubles	Thailand; Dechapol Puavaranukroh; Sapsiree Taerattanachai	Japan; Yuta Watanabe; Arisa Higashino	Hong Kong; Tang Chun Man; Tse Ying Suet

== Players ==
=== Number of participants ===
Nation		MS	WS	MD	WD	XD	Total	Number of players
Africa	Algeria			1			1	2
Africa	Nigeria	1		1			2	2
Asia	China	3	4	4	3	3	17	26
Asia	Chinese Taipei	2	2	2		1	7	9
Asia	Hong Kong	2	2	1	2	3	10	12
Asia	India	4	1	4	2	3	14	23
Asia	Indonesia					1	1	2 (Note: Indonesia originally has 16 qualifiers (26 players), but the Badminton Association of Indonesia decided to withdraw.)
Asia	Japan	3	3	4	4	3	17	28
Asia	Malaysia	3	1	4	2	3	13	22
Asia	Myanmar		1				1	1
Asia	Singapore	1	1				2	2
Asia	South Korea		2		2		4	6
Asia	Sri Lanka	1					1	1
Asia	Thailand	3	4		3	2	12	16
Asia	Vietnam	1	2				3	3
Europe	Austria	1		1	1	1	4	5
Europe	Azerbaijan	1					1	1
Europe	Belgium	1	1			1	3	4
Europe	Bulgaria				1		1	2
Europe	Czech Republic			1			1	2
Europe	Denmark	4	4	3	4	4	19	27
Europe	England	1		2	1	2	6	9
Europe	Estonia		1		1		2	3
Europe	Finland	1					1	1
Europe	France	2	2	1		1	6	8
Europe	Germany	1	1	2	1	2	7	10
Europe	Ireland	1		1	1	1	4	6
Europe	Israel	1	1				2	2
Europe	Italy			1			1	2
Europe	Netherlands	2	1	1	1	2	7	10
Europe	Norway			1			1	2
Europe	Poland	1					1	1
Europe	Portugal	1			1		2	3
Europe	(Russia) NBFR	2	2	1	3	2	10	15
Europe	Scotland		1	2	1	2	6	8
Europe	Slovakia		1				1	1
Europe	Switzerland				1		1	2
Europe	Spain	2	1	1	1	1	6	8
Europe	Sweden	1			1		2	3
Europe	Turkey	1	2		1		4	5
Europe	Ukraine			1	1		2	4
Oceania	Australia		1			1	2	3
Oceania	New Zealand					1	1	2
Pan Am	Brazil	1		1	1	1	4	5
Pan Am	Canada	2	1		1		4	5
Pan Am	Guatemala	1					1	1
Pan Am	Mexico	2					2	2
Pan Am	Peru				1		1	2
Pan Am	United States	2	1				3	3
Total (49 NOCs)		56	44	41	42	41	224	322

=== Players participating in two events ===
Player	MS	WS	MD	WD	XD
(Austria) Philip Birker			check		check
(Austria) Katarina Hochmeir				check	check
(Brazil) Fabricio Farias			check		check
(Brazil) Jaqueline Lima				check	check
(China) Ou Xuanyi			check		check
(Chinese Taipei) Lee Jhe-huei			check		check
(Denmark) Alexandra Bøje				check	check
(Denmark) Amalie Magelund				check	check
(Denmark) Mathias Thyrri			check		
(England) Callum Hemming			check		check
(England) Lauren Smith				check	check
(Germany) Mark Lamsfuß			check		check
(Germany) Isabel Lohau				check	check
(Hong Kong) Chang Tak Ching			check		check
(Hong Kong) Ng Tsz Yau				check	check
(Hong Kong) Ng Wing Yung				check	check
(Hong Kong) Yeung Ming Nok			check		check
(Republic of Ireland) Paul Reynolds			check		check
(Netherlands) Ties van der Lecq			check		check
(Nigeria) Anuoluwapo Juwon Opeyori	check		check		
(Russia) Alina Davletova				check	check
(Scotland) Christopher Grimley			check		check
(Scotland) Adam Hall			check		check
(Scotland) Julie MacPherson				check	check
(Spain) Clara Azurmendi		check		check	
(Thailand) Sapsiree Taerattanachai				check	check

== Performance by nation ==
Nation	First Round	Second Round	Third Round	Quarter-finals	Semi-finals	Final	Winner (s)
Japan	12	16	10	9	5	3	2
China	12	16	9	6	4	2	1
Thailand	9	10	6	3	1	1	1
Singapore	2	2	1	1	1	1	1
India	11	8	6	4	2	1	
South Korea	2	4	4	3	2	1	
Chinese Taipei	6	5	2	2	1	1	
Denmark	14	16	9	2	2		
Malaysia	6	10	8	4	1		
Hong Kong	9	7	6	1	1		
Germany	3	6	3	2			
(Russia) NBFR	7	6	2	1			
Netherlands	6	4	2	1			
Bulgaria		1	1	1			
Canada	3	3	3				
Scotland	5	4	2				
France	4	4	2				
England	2	6	1				
Ireland	3	1	1				
Guatemala	1	1	1				
Norway	1	1	1				
Spain	4	3					
Turkey	4	2					
Brazil	3	2					
Austria	3	1					
Belgium	3	1					
United States	3	1					
Azerbaijan	1	1					
Finland	1	1					
Indonesia	1	1					
New Zealand	1	1					
Switzerland	1	1					
Peru		1					
Poland		1					
Slovakia		1					
Sri Lanka		1					
Vietnam	3						
Australia	2						
Estonia	2						
Israel	2						
Mexico	2						
Nigeria	2						
Portugal	2						
Sweden	2						
Ukraine	2						
Algeria	1						
Czech Republic	1						
Italy	1						
Myanmar	1						
Total	166	150	80	40	20	10	5

Some players/pairs started in the second round or the third round as a result of receiving a bye in the first round and or second round.
