= 2021 BWF World Championships – Mixed doubles =

Badminton championships

Mixed doubles at the 2021 BWF World Championships
- Venue: Palacio de los Deportes Carolina Marín
- Location: Huelva, Spain
- Dates: 12–19 December

Medalists
gold medal	Dechapol Puavaranukroh; Sapsiree Taerattanachai	Thailand
silver medal	Yuta Watanabe; Arisa Higashino	Japan
bronze medal	Kyohei Yamashita; Naru Shinoya	Japan
bronze medal	Tang Chun Man; Tse Ying Suet	Hong Kong

The mixed doubles tournament of the 2021 BWF World Championships took place from 12 to 19 December 2021 at the Palacio de los Deportes Carolina Marín at Huelva.

== Seeds ==
The seeding list is based on the World Rankings of 23 November 2021.

1. (China) Zheng Siwei / Huang Yaqiong (second round)
2. (Thailand) Dechapol Puavaranukroh / Sapsiree Taerattanachai (champions)
3. (Japan) Yuta Watanabe / Arisa Higashino (final)
4. (Indonesia) Praveen Jordan / Melati Daeva Oktavianti (withdrew)
5. (Hong Kong) Tang Chun Man / Tse Ying Suet (semi-finals)
6. (England) Marcus Ellis / Lauren Smith (second round)
7. (Malaysia) Chan Peng Soon / Goh Liu Ying (withdrew)
8. (France) Thom Gicquel / Delphine Delrue (third round)
9. (Malaysia) Tan Kian Meng / Lai Pei Jing (third round)
10. (Malaysia) Goh Soon Huat / Shevon Jemie Lai (quarter-finals)
11. (Germany) Mark Lamsfuß / Isabel Lohau (quarter-finals)
12. (Denmark) Mathias Christiansen / Alexandra Bøje (third round)
13. (Japan) Yuki Kaneko / Misaki Matsutomo (quarter-finals)
14. (Netherlands) Robin Tabeling / Selena Piek (third round)
15. (Indonesia) Rinov Rivaldy / Pitha Haningtyas Mentari (withdrew)
16. (Russia) Rodion Alimov / Alina Davletova (quarter-finals)

== Draw ==
=== Finals ===
Semi-finals
(Japan) Kyohei Yamashita (Japan) Naru Shinoya	13	8
3	(Japan) Yuta Watanabe (Japan) Arisa Higashino	21	21
5	(Hong Kong) Tang Chun Man (Hong Kong) Tse Ying Suet	21	7	10
2	(Thailand) Dechapol Puavaranukroh (Thailand) Sapsiree Taerattanachai	15	21	21

Final
3	(Japan) Yuta Watanabe (Japan) Arisa Higashino	13	14
2	(Thailand) Dechapol Puavaranukroh (Thailand) Sapsiree Taerattanachai	21	21

=== Top half ===
==== Section 1 ====
First Round
(Spain) A Zapico (Spain) L Uslé	8	9
(Hong Kong) Chang T C (Hong Kong) Ng W Y	21	21
(Denmark) N Nøhr (Denmark) A Magelund	21	14
(China) Ou XY (China) Feng XY	23	21
(Japan) K Yamashita (Japan) N Shinoya	w	/	o
(United States) M Fogarty (United States) I Zhong
(Scotland) C Grimley (Scotland) E O'Donnell	15	17
(New Zealand) O Leydon-Davis (New Zealand) A Pak	21	21

Second Round
1	(China) Zheng SW (China) Huang YQ	21	13	17
(Hong Kong) Chang T C (Hong Kong) Ng W Y	16	21	21
16	(Russia) R Alimov (Russia) A Davletova	21	21
(China) Ou XY (China) Feng XY	19	15
6	(England) M Ellis (England) L Smith	16	21	15
(Japan) K Yamashita (Japan) N Shinoya	21	18	21
14	(Netherlands) R Tabeling (Netherlands) S Piek	21	21
(New Zealand) O Leydon-Davis (New Zealand) A Pak	5	11

Third Round
(Hong Kong) Chang T C (Hong Kong) Ng W Y	13	13
16	(Russia) R Alimov (Russia) A Davletova	21	21
(Japan) K Yamashita (Japan) N Shinoya	17	21	21
14	(Netherlands) R Tabeling (Netherlands) S Piek	21	17	17

Quarter-finals
16	(Russia) R Alimov (Russia) A Davletova	13	21	19
(Japan) K Yamashita (Japan) N Shinoya	21	17	21

==== Section 2 ====
First Round
(Belgium) J van Nieuwkerke (Belgium) L Jaques	16	12
(Russia) E Dremin (Russia) E Dimova	21	21
(India) S Sharma (India) A Parikh	w	/	o
(Indonesia) R N Kusharjanto (Indonesia) L A Kusumawati
(Denmark) M Mikkelsen (Denmark) R S Hansen	21	21
(Austria) P Birker (Austria) K Hochmeir	10	12
(England) C Hemming (England) J Pugh	23	22
(Australia) S Leung (Australia) G Somerville	21	20

Second Round
3	(Japan) Y Watanabe (Japan) A Higashino	21	21
(Russia) E Dremin (Russia) E Dimova	10	8
9	(Malaysia) Tan K M (Malaysia) Lai P J	21	21
(India) S Sharma (India) A Parikh	8	18
8	(France) T Gicquel (France) D Delrue	14	21	21
(Denmark) M Mikkelsen (Denmark) R S Hansen	21	16	18
13	(Japan) Y Kaneko (Japan) M Matsutomo	21	21
(England) C Hemming (England) J Pugh	17	10

Third Round
3	(Japan) Y Watanabe (Japan) A Higashino	21	21
9	(Malaysia) Tan K M (Malaysia) Lai P J	19	19
8	(France) T Gicquel (France) D Delrue	15	16
13	(Japan) Y Kaneko (Japan) M Matsutomo	21	21

Quarter-finals
3	(Japan) Y Watanabe (Japan) A Higashino	21	21
13	(Japan) Y Kaneko (Japan) M Matsutomo	14	19

=== Bottom half ===
==== Section 3 ====
First Round
(China) Guo XW (China) Zhang SX	w	/	o
(Guatemala) J Solís (Guatemala) D Corleto Soto
(Chinese Taipei) Lee J-h (Chinese Taipei) Hsu Y-c	19	16
(Scotland) A Hall (Scotland) J MacPherson	21	21
(Republic of Ireland) P Reynolds (Republic of Ireland) R Darragh	14	16
(Indonesia) D Ferdinansyah (Indonesia) S Kani	21	21
(Netherlands) T van der Lecq (Netherlands) D Jille	24	12
(Malaysia) Hoo P R (Malaysia) Cheah Y S	26	21

Second Round
(China) Guo XW (China) Zhang SX	16	21	14
12	(Denmark) M Christiansen (Denmark) A Bøje	21	17	21
(Scotland) A Hall (Scotland) J MacPherson	10	15
5	(Hong Kong) Tang C M (Hong Kong) Tse Y S	21	21
(Indonesia) D Ferdinansyah (Indonesia) S Kani	18	21	16
11	(Germany) M Lamsfuß (Germany) I Lohau	21	18	21
(Malaysia) Hoo P R (Malaysia) Cheah Y S	w	/	o
4	(Indonesia) P Jordan (Indonesia) M D Oktavianti

Third Round
12	(Denmark) M Christiansen (Denmark) A Bøje	15	21	16
5	(Hong Kong) Tang C M (Hong Kong) Tse Y S	21	16	21
11	(Germany) M Lamsfuß (Germany) I Lohau	21	13	21
(Malaysia) Hoo P R (Malaysia) Cheah Y S	13	21	18

Quarter-finals
5	(Hong Kong) Tang C M (Hong Kong) Tse Y S	21	21
11	(Germany) M Lamsfuß (Germany) I Lohau	11	10

==== Section 4 ====
First Round
(Brazil) F Farias (Brazil) J Lima	8	13
(Thailand) S Jomkoh (Thailand) S Paewsampran	21	21
(India) Arjun M.R. (India) K. Maneesha
(Hong Kong) Yeung M N (Hong Kong) Ng T Y	w	/	o
(Denmark) M Thyrri (Denmark) M Surrow	21	21
(India) V G Prasad (India) J Dewangan	8	4
(India) U Arora (India) K Wadkar	20	16
(Germany) P Scheiel (Germany) F Volkmann	22	21

Second Round
(Thailand) S Jomkoh (Thailand) S Paewsampran	13	16
10	(Malaysia) Goh S H (Malaysia) S J Lai	21	21
(Hong Kong) Yeung M N (Hong Kong) Ng T Y	w	/	o
7	(Malaysia) Chan P S (Malaysia) Goh L Y
(Denmark) M Thyrri (Denmark) M Surrow	w	/	o
15	(Indonesia) R Rivaldy (Indonesia) P H Mentari
(Germany) P Scheiel (Germany) F Volkmann	7	13
2	(Thailand) D Puavaranukroh (Thailand) S Taerattanachai	21	21

Third Round
10	(Malaysia) Goh S H (Malaysia) S J Lai	21	19	21
(Hong Kong) Yeung M N (Hong Kong) Ng T Y	8	21	19
(Denmark) M Thyrri (Denmark) M Surrow	9	16
2	(Thailand) D Puavaranukroh (Thailand) S Taerattanachai	21	21

Quarter-finals
10	(Malaysia) Goh S H (Malaysia) S J Lai	15	13
2	(Thailand) D Puavaranukroh (Thailand) S Taerattanachai	21	21
