= 2017 BWF World Championships – Mixed doubles =

International badminton championships

Mixed doubles at the BWF World Championships
- Venue: Emirates Arena
- Location: Glasgow, Scotland
- Dates: 21–27 August

Medalists
gold medal	Tontowi Ahmad; Liliyana Natsir	Indonesia
silver medal	Zheng Siwei; Chen Qingchen	China
bronze medal	Chris Adcock; Gabby Adcock	England
bronze medal	Lee Chun Hei; Chau Hoi Wah	Hong Kong

The mixed doubles tournament of the 2017 BWF World Championships (World Badminton Championships) took place from 21 to 27 August.

== Seeds ==
1. (China) Zheng Siwei / Chen Qingchen (final)
2. (China) Lu Kai / Huang Yaqiong (quarterfinals)
3. (Indonesia) Tontowi Ahmad / Liliyana Natsir (champion)
4. (China) Zhang Nan / Li Yinhui (third round)
5. (England) Chris Adcock / Gabby Adcock (semifinals)
6. (Denmark) Joachim Fischer Nielsen / Christinna Pedersen (third round)
7. (Indonesia) Praveen Jordan / Debby Susanto (quarterfinals)
8. (Malaysia) Tan Kian Meng / Lai Pei Jing (third round)

9. (South Korea) Choi Sol-gyu / Chae Yoo-jung (third round)
10. (Hong Kong) Lee Chun Hei / Chau Hoi Wah (semifinals)
11. (Japan) Kenta Kazuno / Ayane Kurihara (third round)
12. (Hong Kong) Tang Chun Man / Tse Ying Suet (quarterfinals)
13. (China) Wang Yilyu / Huang Dongping (quarterfinals)
14. (Denmark) Mathias Christiansen / Sara Thygesen (third round)
15. (India) Pranav Chopra / N. Sikki Reddy (third round)
16. (Japan) Yuta Watanabe / Arisa Higashino (second round)

Click on the seed number of a player to go to their draw section.

== Draw ==
=== Finals ===
Semifinals
1	(China) Zheng Siwei (China) Chen Qingchen	21	23
5	(England) Chris Adcock (England) Gabby Adcock	15	21
3	(Indonesia) Tontowi Ahmad (Indonesia) Liliyana Natsir	21	21
10	(Hong Kong) Lee Chun Hei (Hong Kong) Chau Hoi Wah	16	13

Final
1	(China) Zheng Siwei (China) Chen Qingchen	21	16	15
3	(Indonesia) Tontowi Ahmad (Indonesia) Liliyana Natsir	15	21	21

=== Section 1 ===
First Round
(Finland) A Kaisti (Finland) J Nyström	13	14
(Switzerland) O Schaller (Switzerland) C Burkart	21	21
(Hong Kong) Tam C H (Hong Kong) Ng T Y	22	17
(India) S Rankireddy (India) M Kukkapalli	24	21
(Canada) T Ng (Canada) R Honderich	14	25	18
(Indonesia) L A Nugroho (Indonesia) R Amelia	21	23	21
(Chinese Taipei) Lu C-y (Chinese Taipei) Chiang K-h	15	21	18
(Malaysia) K Yogendran (India) P Sawant	21	13	21

Second Round
1	(China) Zheng SW (China) Chen QC	21	21
(Switzerland) O Schaller (Switzerland) C Burkart	9	15
14	(Denmark) M Christiansen (Denmark) S Thygesen	22	21
(India) S Rankireddy (India) M Kukkapalli	20	18
7	(Indonesia) P Jordan (Indonesia) D Susanto	21	21
(Indonesia) L A Nugroho (Indonesia) R Amelia	13	11
15	(India) P J Chopra (India) N. S Reddy	21	21
(Malaysia) K Yogendran (India) P Sawant	12	19

Third Round
1	(China) Zheng SW (China) Chen QC	21	21
14	(Denmark) M Christiansen (Denmark) S Thygesen	12	17
7	(Indonesia) P Jordan (Indonesia) D Susanto	20	21	21
15	(India) P J Chopra (India) N. S Reddy	22	18	18

Quarterfinals
1	(China) Zheng SW (China) Chen QC	21	21
7	(Indonesia) P Jordan (Indonesia) D Susanto	16	12

=== Section 2 ===
First Round
(Netherlands) J Arends (Netherlands) S Piek	21	21
(France) J Corvée (France) A Tran	12	18
(Germany) R Beck (Germany) C Nelte	15	21	21
(France) T Gicquel (France) D Delrue	21	19	11
(France) B Kersaudy (France) L Palermo	w	/	o
(Czech Republic) J Bitman (Czech Republic) A Bášová
(Sweden) N Ruponen (Sweden) A Högström	21	21
(Scotland) M Campbell (Scotland) J MacPherson	17	16

Second Round
4	(China) Zhang N (China) Li YH	21	19	21
(Netherlands) J Arends (Netherlands) S Piek	16	21	17
12	(Hong Kong) Tang C M (Hong Kong) Tse Y S	21	21
(Germany) R Beck (Germany) C Nelte	11	17
5	(England) C Adcock (England) G Adcock	21	21
(France) B Kersaudy (France) L Palermo	10	13
11	(Japan) K Kazuno (Japan) A Kurihara	21	21
(Sweden) N Ruponen (Sweden) A Högström	13	5

Third Round
4	(China) Zhang N (China) Li YH	12	21	13
12	(Hong Kong) Tang C M (Hong Kong) Tse Y S	21	17	21
5	(England) C Adcock (England) G Adcock	21	21
11	(Japan) K Kazuno (Japan) A Kurihara	15	16

Quarterfinals
12	(Hong Kong) Tang C M (Hong Kong) Tse Y S	21	13	16
5	(England) C Adcock (England) G Adcock	16	21	21

=== Section 3 ===
First Round
(India) B. S Reddy (India) A Ponnappa	w	/	o
(Australia) S Serasinghe (Australia) S Mapasa
(France) R Labar (France) A Fontaine	21	11	27
(Indonesia) I Fadhilah (Indonesia) W Anggraini	13	21	25
(United States) Y Chan (United States) Y Kawasaki	6	11
(Republic of Ireland) S Magee (Republic of Ireland) C Magee	21	21
(Egypt) A Salah (Egypt) M El-Tanany	9	11
(Chinese Taipei) Tseng M-h (Chinese Taipei) Hu L-f	21	21

Second Round
(India) B. S Reddy (India) A Ponnappa	17	21	5
13	(China) Wang YL (China) Huang DP	21	18	21
(France) R Labar (France) A Fontaine	18	10
8	(Malaysia) Tan K M (Malaysia) Lai P J	21	21
(Republic of Ireland) S Magee (Republic of Ireland) C Magee	21	16	21
16	(Japan) Y Watanabe (Japan) A Higashino	13	21	15
(Chinese Taipei) Tseng M-h (Chinese Taipei) Hu L-f	13	11
3	(Indonesia) T Ahmad (Indonesia) L Natsir	21	21

Third Round
13	(China) Wang YL (China) Huang DP	21	21
8	(Malaysia) Tan K M (Malaysia) Lai P J	15	16
(Republic of Ireland) S Magee (Republic of Ireland) C Magee	21	16	10
3	(Indonesia) T Ahmad (Indonesia) L Natsir	19	21	21

Quarterfinals
13	(China) Wang YL (China) Huang DP	21	15	18
3	(Indonesia) T Ahmad (Indonesia) L Natsir	19	21	21

=== Section 4 ===
First Round
(Netherlands) J Maas (Netherlands) I van der Aar	21	25	8
(Chinese Taipei) Chang K-c (Chinese Taipei) Chang H-t	23	23	21
(England) G Mairs (England) J Moore	10	21	15
(Germany) M Lamsfuß (Germany) I Herttrich	21	16	21
(Netherlands) R Tabeling (Netherlands) C Seinen	21	16	14
(England) B Lane (England) J Pugh	14	21	21
(Chinese Taipei) Liao M-c (Chinese Taipei) Chen H-h	21	21
(Russia) E Dremin (Russia) E Dimova	18	19

Second Round
(Chinese Taipei) Chang K-c (Chinese Taipei) Chang H-t	14	17
10	(Hong Kong) Lee C H (Hong Kong) Chau H W	21	21
(Germany) M Lamsfuß (Germany) I Herttrich	12	8
6	(Denmark) J F Nielsen (Denmark) C Pedersen	21	21
(England) B Lane (England) J Pugh	12	10
9	(South Korea) Choi S-g (South Korea) Chae Y-j	21	21
(Chinese Taipei) Liao M-c (Chinese Taipei) Chen H-h	16	10
2	(China) Lu K (China) Huang YQ	21	21

Third Round
10	(Hong Kong) Lee C H (Hong Kong) Chau H W	5
6	(Denmark) J F Nielsen (Denmark) C Pedersen	5^{r}
9	(South Korea) Choi S-g (South Korea) Chae Y-j	14	16
2	(China) Lu K (China) Huang YQ	21	21

Quarterfinals
10	(Hong Kong) Lee C H (Hong Kong) Chau H W	21	17	21
2	(China) Lu K (China) Huang YQ	13	21	15
