= 2018 BWF World Championships – Mixed doubles =

Mixed doubles at the BWF World Championships
- Venue: Nanjing Youth Olympic Sports Park Indoor Arena
- Location: Nanjing, China
- Dates: 30 July – 5 August

Medalists
gold medal	Zheng Siwei; Huang Yaqiong	China
silver medal	Wang Yilü; Huang Dongping	China
bronze medal	Zhang Nan; Li Yinhui	China
bronze medal	Tang Chun Man; Tse Ying Suet	Hong Kong

The mixed doubles tournament of the 2018 BWF World Championships (World Badminton Championships) took place from 30 July to 5 August.

== Seeds ==
The seeding list is based on the World Rankings from 12 July 2018.

1. (China) Zheng Siwei / Huang Yaqiong (world champions)
2. (China) Wang Yilü / Huang Dongping (final)
3. (Hong Kong) Tang Chun Man / Tse Ying Suet (semifinals)
4. (Denmark) Mathias Christiansen / Christinna Pedersen (quarterfinals)
5. (China) Zhang Nan / Li Yinhui (semifinals)
6. (England) Chris Adcock / Gabby Adcock (quarterfinals)
7. (Malaysia) Goh Soon Huat / Shevon Jemie Lai (third round)
8. (Malaysia) Chan Peng Soon / Goh Liu Ying (quarterfinals)

9. (China) He Jiting / Du Yue (third round)
10. (Thailand) Dechapol Puavaranukroh / Sapsiree Taerattanachai (third round)
11. (England) Marcus Ellis / Lauren Smith (third round)
12. (Indonesia) Hafiz Faizal / Gloria Emanuelle Widjaja (third round)
13. (Indonesia) Praveen Jordan / Melati Daeva Oktavianti (third round)
14. (Chinese Taipei) Wang Chi-lin / Lee Chia-hsin (third round)
15. (Germany) Mark Lamsfuß / Isabel Herttrich (second round)
16. (Japan) Yuta Watanabe / Arisa Higashino (third round)

Click on the seed number of a player to go to their draw section.

== Draw ==
=== Finals ===
Semifinals
1	(China) Zheng Siwei (China) Huang Yaqiong	19	21	21
5	(China) Zhang Nan (China) Li Yinhui	21	12	10
3	(Hong Kong) Tang Chun Man (Hong Kong) Tse Ying Suet	6	10
2	(China) Wang Yilü (China) Huang Dongping	21	21

Final
1	(China) Zheng Siwei (China) Huang Yaqiong	21	21
2	(China) Wang Yilü (China) Huang Dongping	17	19

=== Top half ===
==== Section 1 ====
First round
(Chinese Taipei) Lu C-y (Chinese Taipei) Chiang K-h	10	21	16
(Russia) E Dremin (Russia) E Dimova	21	14	21
(India) P Chopra (India) N. S Reddy	21	21
(Czech Republic) J Bitman (Czech Republic) A Bášová	17	15
(Netherlands) J Arends (Netherlands) S Piek	21	21
(United States) M Fogarty (United States) I Zhong	6	4
(Denmark) N Nøhr (Denmark) S Thygesen	9	20
(India) S Rankireddy (India) A Ponnappa	21	22

Second round
1	(China) Zheng SW (China) Huang YQ	21	21
(Russia) E Dremin (Russia) E Dimova	13	10
12	(Indonesia) H Faizal (Indonesia) G E Widjaja	21	21
(India) P Chopra (India) N. S Reddy	16	4
7	(Malaysia) Goh S H (Malaysia) S J Lai	21	21
(Netherlands) J Arends (Netherlands) S Piek	13	17
15	(Germany) M Lamsfuß (Germany) I Herttrich	21	17	18
(India) S Rankireddy (India) A Ponnappa	10	21	21

Third round
1	(China) Zheng SW (China) Huang YQ	21	21
12	(Indonesia) H Faizal (Indonesia) G E Widjaja	15	13
7	(Malaysia) Goh S H (Malaysia) S J Lai	22	14	6
(India) S Rankireddy (India) A Ponnappa	20	21	21

Quarterfinals
1	(China) Zheng SW (China) Huang YQ	21	21
(India) S Rankireddy (India) A Ponnappa	17	10

==== Section 2 ====
First round
(Hong Kong) Lee C H (Hong Kong) Chau H W	21	21
(Bulgaria) D Yanakiev (Bulgaria) M Mitsova	11	16
(Chinese Taipei) Liao M-c (Chinese Taipei) Chen H-h	16	15
(Malaysia) Tan K M (Malaysia) Lai P J	21	21
(Russia) R Alimov (Russia) A Davletova	7	12
(Germany) P Käsbauer (Germany) O Konon	21	21
(Norway) F Kristensen (Norway) S F Jørgensen	13	8
(Republic of Ireland) S Magee (Republic of Ireland) C Magee	21	21

Second round
4	(Denmark) M Christiansen (Denmark) C Pedersen	20
(Hong Kong) Lee C H (Hong Kong) Chau H W	11^{r}
10	(Thailand) D Puavaranukroh (Thailand) S Taerattanachai	21	21
(Malaysia) Tan K M (Malaysia) Lai P J	12	15
5	(China) Zhang N (China) Li YH	21	25
(Germany) P Käsbauer (Germany) O Konon	10	23
14	(Chinese Taipei) Wang C-l (Chinese Taipei) Lee C-h	21	21
(Republic of Ireland) S Magee (Republic of Ireland) C Magee	11	15

Third round
4	(Denmark) M Christiansen (Denmark) C Pedersen	21	21	21
10	(Thailand) D Puavaranukroh (Thailand) S Taerattanachai	15	23	10
5	(China) Zhang N (China) Li YH	21	21
14	(Chinese Taipei) Wang C-l (Chinese Taipei) Lee C-h	10	15

Quarterfinals
4	(Denmark) M Christiansen (Denmark) C Pedersen	15	20
5	(China) Zhang N (China) Li YH	21	22

=== Bottom half ===
==== Section 3 ====
First round
(Netherlands) R Tabeling (Netherlands) C Seinen	16	17
(Japan) Y Kobayashi (Japan) M Matsutomo	21	21
(India) S Sharma (India) A Parikh	21	21
(Nigeria) E Abah (Nigeria) P Orji	13	12
(France) R Labar (France) A Fontaine	21	18	17
(Vietnam) Đỗ T Đ (Vietnam) Phạm N T	17	21	21
(Indonesia) Y E Saputra (Indonesia) M G Islami	13	14
(France) T Gicquel (France) D Delrue	21	21

Second round
(Japan) Y Kobayashi (Japan) M Matsutomo	21	16	14
11	(England) M Ellis (England) L Smith	13	21	21
(India) S Sharma (India) A Parikh	18	11
8	(Malaysia) Chan P S (Malaysia) Goh L Y	21	21
(Vietnam) Đỗ T Đ (Vietnam) Phạm N T	8	6
13	(Indonesia) P Jordan (Indonesia) M D Oktavianti	21	21
(France) T Gicquel (France) D Delrue	11	15
3	(Hong Kong) Tang C M (Hong Kong) Tse Y S	21	21

Third round
11	(England) M Ellis (England) L Smith	16	21	18
8	(Malaysia) Chan P S (Malaysia) Goh L Y	21	17	21
13	(Indonesia) P Jordan (Indonesia) M D Oktavianti	15	21	24
3	(Hong Kong) Tang C M (Hong Kong) Tse Y S	21	19	26

Quarterfinals
8	(Malaysia) Chan P S (Malaysia) Goh L Y	12	21	10
3	(Hong Kong) Tang C M (Hong Kong) Tse Y S	21	11	21

==== Section 4 ====
First round
(Chinese Taipei) Lee Y (Chinese Taipei) Hsu Y-c	21	21
(Switzerland) O Schaller (Switzerland) C Burkart	14	17
(Canada) T Ng (Canada) R Honderich	19	6
(India) R Kapoor (India) K Garg	21	21
(Germany) M E Seidel (Germany) L Efler	21	21
(England) B Lane (England) J Pugh	10	18
(Indonesia) R Alexander (Indonesia) A Saufika	21	11	21
(France) B Kersaudy (France) L Palermo	19	21	16

Second round
(Chinese Taipei) Lee Y (Chinese Taipei) Hsu Y-c	21	19	10
9	(China) He JT (China) Du Y	19	21	21
(India) R Kapoor (India) K Garg	12	12
6	(England) C Adcock (England) G Adcock	21	21
(Germany) M E Seidel (Germany) L Efler	10	9
16	(Japan) Y Watanabe (Japan) A Higashino	21	21
(Indonesia) R Alexander (Indonesia) A Saufika	9	21	15
2	(China) Wang YL (China) Huang DP	21	15	21

Third round
9	(China) He JT (China) Du Y	16	16
6	(England) C Adcock (England) G Adcock	21	21
16	(Japan) Y Watanabe (Japan) A Higashino	21	17	13
2	(China) Wang YL (China) Huang DP	13	21	21

Quarterfinals
6	(England) C Adcock (England) G Adcock	13	18
2	(China) Wang YL (China) Huang DP	21	21
