= Chang Tak Ching =

Hong Kong badminton player (born 1995)

Chang Tak Ching 張德正
Personal information
- Born: 22 January 1995 (age 31) Hong Kong
- Height: 1.88 m (6 ft 2 in)

Sport
- Country: Hong Kong
- Sport: Badminton
- Handedness: Right

Men's and mixed doubles
- Highest ranking: 57 (MD with Yeung Ming Nok 10 March 2020); 23 (XD with Ng Wing Yung 15 November 2022)
- Current ranking: 277 (MD with Yeung Ming Nok); 50 (XD with Ng Wing Yung) (24 January 2023)
- BWF profile
Medal record
Men's badminton
Representing Hong Kong
Asia Mixed Team Championships
Bronze medal – third place	2019 Hong Kong	Mixed team

Chang Tak Ching (Chinese: 張德正; born 22 January 1995) is a Hong Kong badminton player. He, partnered with Ng Wing Yung, participated in the 2021 BWF World Championships' mixed doubles event, and defeated the top seeds and the defending champions Zheng Siwei and Huang Yaqiong in the second round by 16–21, 21–13, 21–17.

== Achievements ==
=== BWF International Challenge/Series (3 runners-up) ===
Mixed doubles
Year	Tournament	Partner	Opponent	Score	Result
2017	Singapore International	(Hong Kong) Ng Wing Yung	(Indonesia) Andika Ramadiansyah (Indonesia) Mychelle Crhystine Bandaso	16–21, 18–21	(silver) Runner-up
2017	India International	(Hong Kong) Ng Wing Yung	(Hong Kong) Mak Hee Chun (Hong Kong) Yeung Nga Ting	11–21, 21–17, 18–21	(silver) Runner-up
2018	India International	(Hong Kong) Ng Wing Yung	(Thailand) Nipitphon Phuangphuapet (Thailand) Savitree Amitrapai	13–21, 16–21	(silver) Runner-up

BWF International Challenge tournament
BWF International Series tournament
BWF Future Series tournament
