= Ng Wing Yung =

Hong Kong badminton player (born 1995)

Ng Wing Yung 吳詠瑢
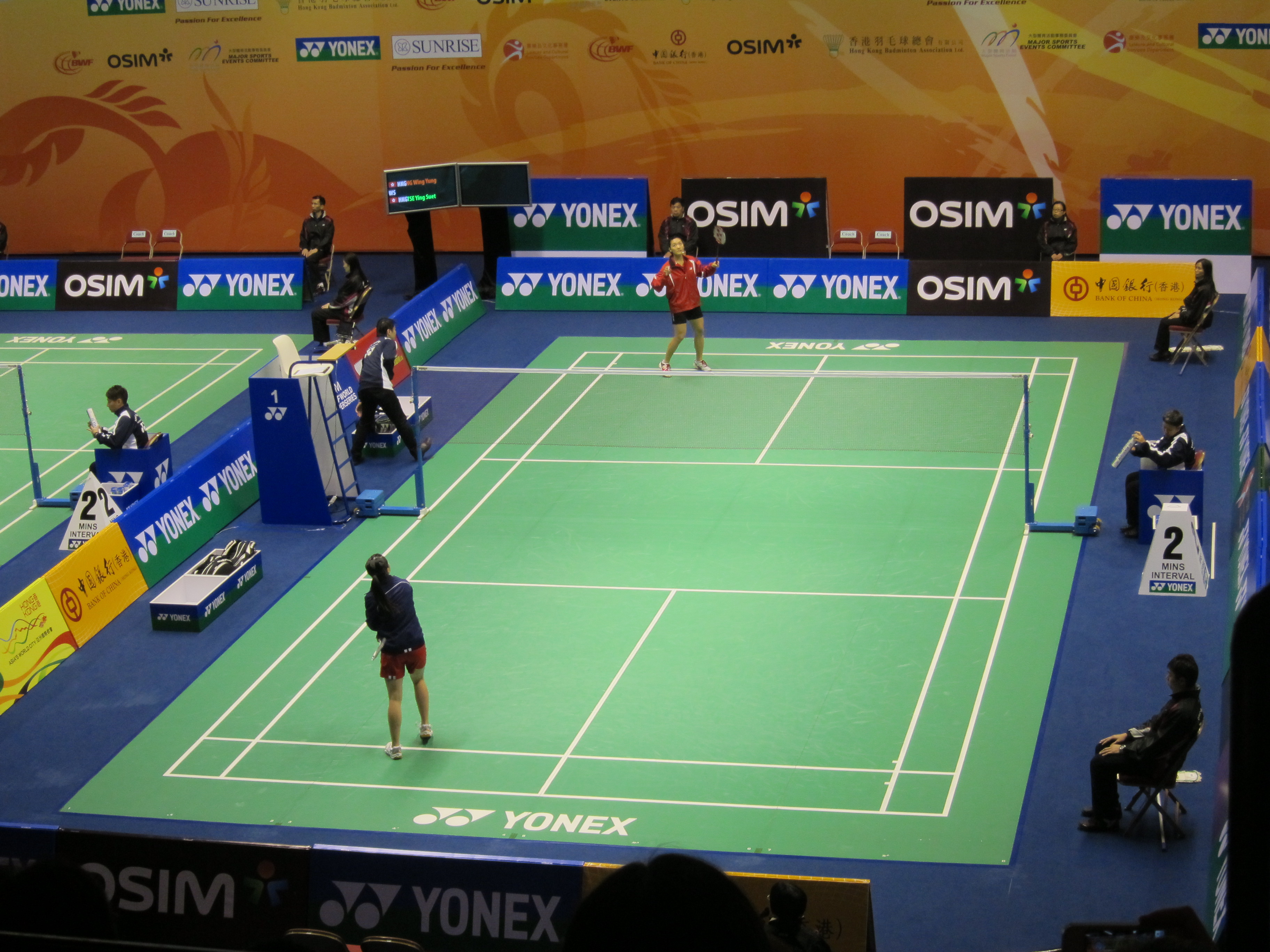

Personal information
- Born: 17 May 1995 (age 31) Hong Kong
- Height: 1.63 m (5 ft 4 in)

Sport
- Country: Hong Kong
- Sport: Badminton
- Handedness: Right

Women's & mixed doubles
- Highest ranking: 35 (WD with Yeung Nga Ting, 15 January 2019); 23 (XD with Chang Tak Ching, 15 November 2022)
- Current ranking: 43 (WD with Lui Lok Lok, 19 March 2024)
- BWF profile
Medal record
Women's badminton
Representing Hong Kong
Asia Mixed Team Championships
Bronze medal – third place	2019 Hong Kong	Mixed team

Ng Wing Yung (Chinese: 吳詠瑢; Jyutping: ng4 wing6 jung4; born 17 May 1995) is a Hong Kong badminton player. She, partnered with Chang Tak Ching, participated in the 2021 BWF World Championships' mixed doubles event, and defeated the top seed, the defending champions Zheng Siwei and Huang Yaqiong in the second round by 16–21, 21–13, 21–17.

== Achievements ==
=== BWF World Tour (1 runner-up) ===
The BWF World Tour, which was announced on 19 March 2017 and implemented in 2018, is a series of elite badminton tournaments sanctioned by the Badminton World Federation (BWF). The BWF World Tours are divided into levels of World Tour Finals, Super 1000, Super 750, Super 500, Super 300, and the BWF Tour Super 100.

Women's doubles
Year	Tournament	Level	Partner	Opponent	Score	Result
2023	Malaysia Super 100	Super 100	(Hong Kong) Lui Lok Lok	(Thailand) Laksika Kanlaha (Thailand) Phataimas Muenwong	21–16, 16–21, 16–21	(silver) Runner-up

=== BWF International Challenge/Series (2 titles, 6 runners-up) ===
Women's doubles
Year	Tournament	Partner	Opponent	Score	Result
2017	India International	(Hong Kong) Yuen Sin Ying	(Hong Kong) Ng Tsz Yau (Hong Kong) Yeung Nga Ting	23–25, 21–14, 19–21	(silver) Runner-up
2018	Singapore International	(Hong Kong) Yeung Nga Ting	(Hong Kong) Ng Tsz Yau (Hong Kong) Yuen Sin Ying	17–21, 17–21	(silver) Runner-up
2018	India International	(Hong Kong) Yeung Nga Ting	(India) Meghana Jakkampudi (India) Poorvisha S. Ram	21–10, 21–11	(gold) Winner
2023	Thailand International	(Hong Kong) Lui Lok Lok	(Chinese Taipei) Liu Chiao-yun (Chinese Taipei) Wang Yu-qiao	9–21, 15–21	(silver) Runner-up
2023	Mongolia International	(Hong Kong) Lui Lok Lok	(Australia) Setyana Mapasa (Australia) Angela Yu	21–16, 21–18	(gold) Winner

Mixed doubles
Year	Tournament	Partner	Opponent	Score	Result
2017	Singapore International	(Hong Kong) Chang Tak Ching	(Indonesia) Andika Ramadiansyah (Indonesia) Mychelle Crhystine Bandaso	16–21, 18–21	(silver) Runner-up
2017	India International	(Hong Kong) Chang Tak Ching	(Hong Kong) Mak Hee Chun (Hong Kong) Yeung Nga Ting	11–21, 21–17, 18–21	(silver) Runner-up
2018	India International	(Hong Kong) Chang Tak Ching	(Thailand) Nipitphon Phuangphuapet (Thailand) Savitree Amitrapai	13–21, 16–21	(silver) Runner-up

BWF International Challenge tournament
BWF International Series tournament
BWF Future Series tournament
