= Dechapol Puavaranukroh =

Thai badminton player (born 1997)

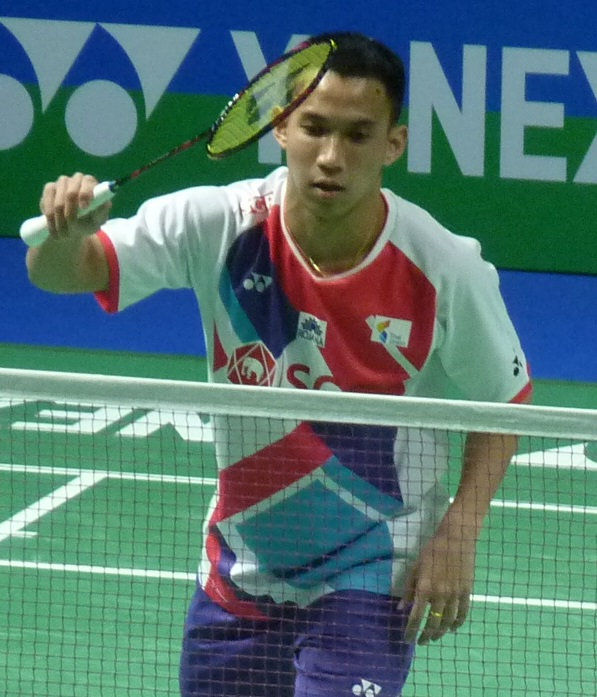
- Dechapol at the 2022 German Open

Personal information
- Nickname: Bass
- Born: 20 May 1997 (age 29) Chonburi, Thailand
- Height: 1.69 m (5 ft 7 in)

Sport
- Country: Thailand
- Sport: Badminton
- Handedness: Right

Men's and mixed doubles
- Highest ranking: 12 (MD with Kittinupong Kedren, 8 July 2025); 1 (XD with Sapsiree Taerattanachai, 7 December 2021)
- Current ranking: 6 (XD with Supissara Paewsampran, 17 November 2026)
- BWF profile
Medal record
Men's badminton
Representing Thailand
World Championships
Gold medal – first place	2021 Huelva	Mixed doubles
Silver medal – second place	2019 Basel	Mixed doubles
Sudirman Cup
Bronze medal – third place	2017 Gold Coast	Mixed team
Bronze medal – third place	2019 Nanning	Mixed team
Asian Games
Bronze medal – third place	2026 Aichi–Nagoya	Men's team
Asian Championships
Silver medal – second place	2017 Wuhan	Mixed doubles
Silver medal – second place	2026 Ningbo	Mixed doubles
Bronze medal – third place	2019 Wuhan	Mixed doubles
Asia Mixed Team Championships
Bronze medal – third place	2017 Ho Chi Minh	Mixed team
SEA Games
Gold medal – first place	2017 Malaysia	Men's doubles
Gold medal – first place	2017 Malaysia	Mixed doubles
Silver medal – second place	2025 Thailand	Mixed doubles
Bronze medal – third place	2017 Malaysia	Men's team
Bronze medal – third place	2025 Thailand	Men's team
World Junior Championships
Gold medal – first place	2014 Alor Setar	Boys' doubles
Bronze medal – third place	2014 Alor Setar	Mixed team
Asian Youth Games
Silver medal – second place	2013 Nanjing	Mixed doubles

Dechapol Puavaranukroh (Thai: เดชาพล พัววรานุเคราะห์; born 20 May 1997) is a Thai badminton player. He won a gold medal in the 2014 BWF World Junior Championships in the boys' doubles event with his partner Kittinupong Kedren. Dechapol claimed doubles titles at the 2017 SEA Games by winning the gold medal in the men's doubles with Kedren and in the mixed doubles with Sapsiree Taerattanachai. Together with Sapsiree, he won the silver and gold medals at the BWF World Championships in 2019 and 2021 respectively, became the first Thai pair who won the world title. The duo made a clean sweep of all three 2020 Asian leg titles in Thailand and all 2021 Bali leg titles, thus climbing to world number 1 in the BWF ranking. Dechapol and Sapsiree made history as the first ever Thai players to win a title in the year-end Finals tournaments and rank first in the world ranking.

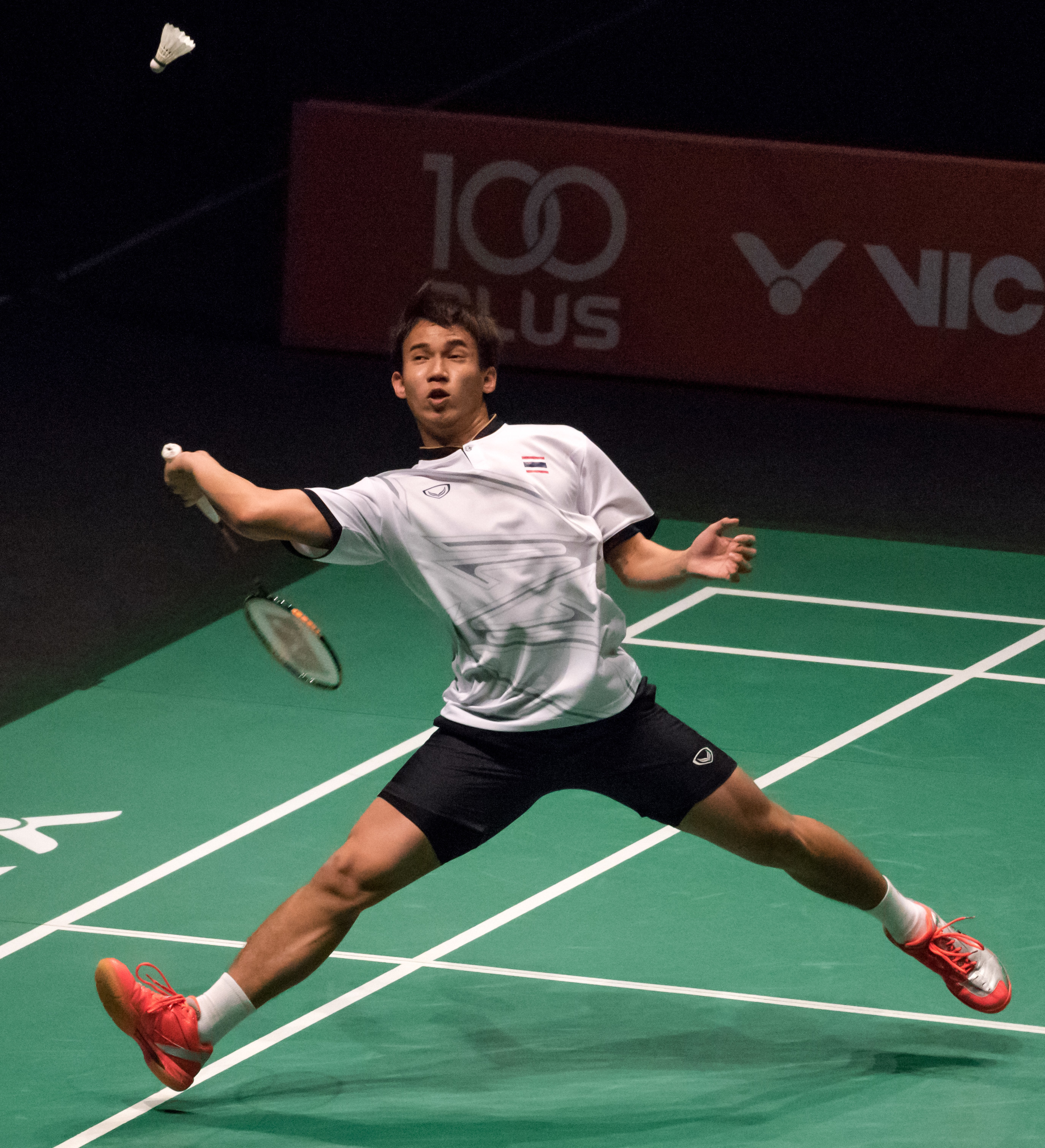
Puavaranukroh at the 2017 SEA Games

== Career ==
=== Early life and junior career ===
Dechapol began playing badminton at the age of seven, influenced by his family. At age 14, he enrolled in the SCG Badminton Academy, a specialized boarding school for developing young athletes, where he focused on doubles play. During his time in Thailand's youth development system, he formed key junior partnerships, competing in boys' doubles with Kittinupong Kedren and mixed doubles with Puttita Supajirakul. His consistent performance in these disciplines led to his selection for the Thailand national junior team. Dechapol subsequently represented the country in international junior competitions, achieving steady progression in both regional and global junior rankings. In 2013, Dechapol and Puttita won the silver medal in the mixed doubles at the Asian Youth Games in Nanjing. The following year, he captured the gold medal in the boys' doubles at the World Junior Championships alongside Kittinupong. The pair also finished runner-up at the Smiling Fish International tournament.

=== 2015–2017: First Grand Prix title, 2 golds at the SEA Games ===
As he transitioned to the senior circuit, Dechapol focused primarily on the men's doubles. His best result with Kittinupong in 2015 was a semi-final appearance at the Mexico City Grand Prix. Later that year, he expanded his participation to two disciplines and formed a mixed doubles partnership with Sapsiree Taerattanachai. The pair made their debut at the USA International, reaching the semi-finals. In 2016, together with Sapsiree, he reached his first ever BWF Grand Prix final at the 2016 Syed Modi International, where they finished runner-up to Praveen Jordan and Debby Susanto. They also reached the final of the Korea Masters in December, losing to home pair Ko Sung-hyun and Kim Ha-na. Together with Kittinupong, their best result was reaching the final at the Polish Open, a BWF International Challenge tournament.

Dechapol enjoyed a successful 2017 season, starting at the Thailand Masters where he was a finalist in the mixed doubles and a semi-finalist in the men's doubles. He then won a bronze medal at the Asia Mixed Team Championships, and claimed his Grand Prix title with Sapsiree at the Swiss Open. The pair later reached their first-ever Superseries final at the Singapore Open. At the Asian Championships in Wuhan, they defeated world number one pair Zheng Siwei and Chen Qingchen in the quarter-finals, and won the silver medal after being defeated by Lu Kai and Huang Yaqiong in the final. He then broke into the world top 10 of the BWF mixed doubles rankings in May. In his Sudirman Cup debut, he helped the team win a bronze medal. His career continued to soar when he won two gold medals in the men's and mixed doubles, and also a bronze in the team event at the SEA Games in Malaysia.

=== 2018–2019: World Championships silver ===
In early 2018, following an injury to his regular mixed doubles partner, Sapsiree, Dechapol partnered with Puttita in the mixed doubles competition. The newly formed pair produced a notable result by finishing as runners-up at the Thailand Masters. Despite several deep tournament runs throughout the season, Dechapol did not secure a title with either Sapsiree in the mixed doubles or Kittinupong in the men's doubles. His best results with Sapsiree included a runner-up finish at the Denmark Open, and semi-final appearances at the New Zealand, Singapore, Korea, French, and the Hong Kong Opens. In the men's doubles, his strongest performances alongside Kittinupong were quarter-final finishes at the Malaysia Masters and the Korea Open.

Dechapol made his debut at the Asian Games in 2018, where he was eliminated in the early rounds of the men's doubles event and reached the quarter-finals in the mixed doubles. At the team level, Thailand's men's squad was unable to advance beyond the early stages of both the Asian Games and the Thomas Cup. His consistent performances with Sapsiree throughout the season earned the pair qualification for the BWF World Tour Finals, where they advanced to the semi-finals.

In 2019, Dechapol largely shifted his focus to the mixed doubles with Sapsiree as the pair pursued qualification for the 2020 Olympic Games, resulting in a significant reduction in his appearances in the men's doubles competition. Dechapol and Sapsiree began the season with back-to-back runner-up finishes at the Thailand and Malaysia Masters. They subsequently reached the semi-finals of the Asian Championships, earning bronze medals, before helping Thailand secure a bronze medal at the Sudirman Cup. The pair then captured their first title of the year at the Singapore Open, followed by further triumphs at the Korea and Macau Opens. Their strong performances throughout the season culminated at the World Championships, where they became the first Thai mixed doubles pair to reach the final and ultimately claimed the silver medal after finishing as runners-up to China's Zheng Siwei and Huang Yaqiong.

=== 2020–2021: World number 1 and World Championships gold ===
During the 2020–2021 period, Dechapol achieved unprecedented success in the mixed doubles alongside his partner Sapsiree. Their historic run began in March 2020 when they finished as runners-up at the All England Open, shortly before the international circuit was suspended due to the COVID-19 pandemic. Upon the sport's resumption in January 2021, the duo pulled off a historic "clean sweep" of the Asian Leg in Bangkok, clinching titles at the Yonex Thailand Open, the Toyota Thailand Open, and the 2020 BWF World Tour Finals, which subsequently propelled them to a then-career-high of world number two. In July 2021, they made their debut appearance at the rescheduled 2020 Tokyo Olympics, where they advanced out of the group stage but were ultimately eliminated in the quarter-finals by the Japanese pair Yuta Watanabe and Arisa Higashino. Following their Olympic campaign, Dechapol and Sapsiree returned to peak form on the European circuit; after a runner-up finish at the Denmark Open in October, they initiated an extraordinary 26-match winning streak, capturing the Hylo Open title in Germany. The duo executing another remarkable clean sweep at the Indonesia badminton festival in Bali by winning the Indonesia Masters, Indonesia Open, and the World Tour Finals back-to-back. This spectacular momentum culminated in December 2021, when they made history by winning the gold medal at the BWF World Championships in Huelva, Spain, officially securing the world number one in the BWF world ranking.

=== 2022–2023: Race to Paris: continued success on the World Tour ===
In 2022, Dechapol and Sapsiree securing multiple top-tier international titles and podium finishes throughout the BWF World Tour season. Their campaign began in March when they clinched the German Open title, defeating the Chinese pair Ou Xuanyi and Huang Yaqiong in the final. Returning to home soil in May, the duo reached the final of the Thailand Open but finished as runners-up following a narrow defeat to Zheng Siwei and Huang Yaqiong. Their competitive rivalry with the top Chinese pair extended into July, where Dechapol and Sapsiree secured another runner-up finish at the Malaysia Open, before bouncing back two weeks later to capture the Singapore Open title by defeating Wang Yilyu and Huang Dongping. The tandem maintained their momentum into September, claiming their first-ever Japan Open title with a hard-fought victory over Yuta Watanabe and Arisa Higashino in Tokyo. To cap off the season in December, the pair advanced to the final of the season-ending BWF World Tour Finals—which had been relocated to Bangkok—where they concluded their year as runners-up after falling to Zheng and Huang once more.

Following the official commencement of the BWF "Race to Paris" Olympic qualification period on 1 May 2023, Dechapol and Sapsiree campaign hit a high note later that month at the Malaysia Masters, where the duo clinched the title after defeating the Chinese pair Feng Yanzhe and Huang Dongping in a three-game final match. The tandem carried this momentum directly into the following week at the Thailand Open in Bangkok, advancing to the final on home soil but ultimately finishing as runners-up following a close three-game defeat to South Korea's Kim Won-ho and Jeong Na-eun. In late July, Dechapol and Sapsiree reached another final at the Japan Open in Tokyo, where they concluded the tournament as runners-up after a hard-fought three-game battle against the host pair, Watanabe and Higashino.

=== 2024: Final season with Sapsiree and new partnership with Supissara ===
Dechapol commenced the 2024 season alongside Sapsiree, clinching the mixed doubles title at the India Open by defeating China's Jiang Zhenbang and Wei Yaxin in the final. They sustained this momentum by clinching a consecutive victory on home soil at the Thailand Masters. The duo maintained their strong form by reaching the final of the Thailand Open, finishing as runners-up to Guo Xinwa and Chen Fanghui, before making a semi-final appearance at the Indonesia Open. Following a quarter-final exit at the 2024 Paris Summer Olympics in August, Dechapol and Sapsiree officially dissolved their 9 years historic partnership. In October 2024, Dechapol formed a new mixed doubles pairing with Supissara Paewsampran, while also occasionally re-entering the men's doubles discipline with former junior partner Kittinupong Kedren. The newly established mixed doubles pair made an immediate impact on the BWF World Tour, seamlessly capturing consecutive titles at the Japan Masters and the Syed Modi International.

=== 2025: Six World Tour titles and Eddy Choong Rising Star of the Year ===
Dechapol opened the 2025 season at the Super 1000 event, Malaysia Open, where he and Supissara captured the mixed doubles title by defeating China's world number one pair, Feng Yanzhe and Huang Dongping, in a thrilling three-game final. The duo maintained their undefeated momentum on home soil at the Thailand Masters, clinching back-to-back titles with a straight-game victory over Dejan Ferdinansyah and Siti Fadia Silva Ramadhanti, while he simultaneously reached the semi-finals of the men's doubles event with Kittinupong. Following these triumphs, he achieved a milestone at the Swiss Open; by capturing the men's doubles title with Kittinupong, he secured his first-ever senior international tournament victory alongside his long-term partner since their junior career days together. Dechapol and Supissara then claimed the Singapore Open title, before recording a runner-up finish at the Indonesia Open and another runner-up finish to the defending champion Jiang Zhenbang and Wei Yaxin at the Japan Open.

Dechapol and Supissara maintained their prominent tier-one status later in the season, capturing the China Masters title and became the first ever non-Chinese pair to win the mixed doubles at the China Masters since its inception in 2005. The duo later finished as runner-up at the French Open and a victory at the Japan Masters. Representing Thailand on home soil at the SEA Games, Dechapol contributed to a bronze medal in the men's team event and a silver medal in the mixed doubles. This exceptional consistency across the year saw Puavaranukroh reach a total of ten finals across both categories, capturing six World Tour titles. To cap off his stellar season, his accumulated tour points comfortably secured his and Paewsampran's qualification for the season-ending BWF World Tour Finals and was honoured with "Eddy Choong Rising Star of the Year" award by the Badminton World Federation; however, despite their strong regular season form, the duo's campaign ended prematurely when they were eliminated in the group stage of the tournament.

== Achievements ==
=== BWF World Championships ===
Mixed doubles
Year	Venue	Partner	Opponent	Score	Result	Ref.
2019	St. Jakobshalle; Basel, Switzerland	(Thailand) Sapsiree Taerattanachai	(China) Zheng Siwei (China) Huang Yaqiong	8–21, 12–21	Silver	
2021	Palacio de los Deportes Carolina Marín; Huelva, Spain	(Thailand) Sapsiree Taerattanachai	(Japan) Yuta Watanabe (Japan) Arisa Higashino	21–13, 21–14	Gold	

=== Asian Championships ===
Mixed doubles
Year	Venue	Partner	Opponent	Score	Result	Ref.
2017	Wuhan Sports Center Gymnasium, Wuhan, China	(Thailand) Sapsiree Taerattanachai	(China) Lu Kai (China) Huang Yaqiong	18–21, 11–21	Silver	
2019	Wuhan Sports Center Gymnasium, Wuhan, China	(Thailand) Sapsiree Taerattanachai	(China) Wang Yilyu (China) Huang Dongping	21–23, 10–21	Bronze	
2026	Ningbo Olympic Sports Center Gymnasium, Ningbo, China	(Thailand) Supissara Paewsampran	(South Korea) Kim Jae-hyeon (South Korea) Jang Ha-jeong	Walkover	Silver	

=== SEA Games ===
Men's doubles
Year	Venue	Partner	Opponent	Score	Result	Ref.
2017	Axiata Arena; Kuala Lumpur, Malaysia	(Thailand) Kittinupong Kedren	(Malaysia) Ong Yew Sin (Malaysia) Teo Ee Yi	21–19, 20–22, 21–17	Gold	

Mixed doubles
Year	Venue	Partner	Opponent	Score	Result	Ref.
2017	Axiata Arena; Kuala Lumpur, Malaysia	(Thailand) Sapsiree Taerattanachai	(Malaysia) Goh Soon Huat (Malaysia) Shevon Jemie Lai	21–15, 22–20	Gold	
2025	Gymnasium 4, Thammasat University Rangsit Campus; Pathum Thani, Thailand	(Thailand) Supissara Paewsampran	(Thailand) Ruttanapak Oupthong (Thailand) Jhenicha Sudjaipraparat	20–22, 19–21	Silver	

=== BWF World Junior Championships ===
Boys' doubles
Year	Venue	Partner	Opponent	Score	Result	Ref.
2014	Stadium Sultan Abdul Halim; Alor Setar, Malaysia	(Thailand) Kittinupong Kedren	(Japan) Masahide Nakata (Japan) Katsuki Tamate	21–16, 21–18	Gold	

=== Asian Youth Games ===
Mixed doubles
Year	Venue	Partner	Opponent	Score	Result	Ref.
2013	Sport Institute Gymnasium; Nanjing, China	(Thailand) Puttita Supajirakul	(Japan) Minoru Koga (Japan) Akane Yamaguchi	19–21, 21–9, 17–21	Silver	

=== BWF World Tour (25 titles, 15 runners-up) ===
The BWF World Tour, which was announced on 19 March 2017 and implemented in 2018, is a series of elite badminton tournaments sanctioned by the Badminton World Federation (BWF). The BWF World Tour is divided into levels of World Tour Finals, Super 1000, Super 750, Super 500, Super 300, and the BWF Tour Super 100.

Men's doubles
Year	Tournament	Level	Partner	Opponent	Score	Result	Ref.
2025	Swiss Open	Super 300	(Thailand) Kittinupong Kedren	(Indonesia) Muhammad Shohibul Fikri (Indonesia) Daniel Marthin	21–15, 18–21, 21–14	(gold) Winner	

Mixed doubles
Year	Tournament	Level	Partner	Opponent	Score	Result	Ref.
2018	Thailand Masters	Super 300	(Thailand) Puttita Supajirakul	(Malaysia) Chan Peng Soon (Malaysia) Goh Liu Ying	15–21, 21–14, 16–21	(silver) Runner-up	
2018	Denmark Open	Super 750	(Thailand) Sapsiree Taerattanachai	(China) Zheng Siwei (China) Huang Yaqiong	16–21, 13–21	(silver) Runner-up	
2019	Thailand Masters	Super 300	(Thailand) Sapsiree Taerattanachai	(Malaysia) Chan Peng Soon (Malaysia) Goh Liu Ying	16–21, 15–21	(silver) Runner-up	
2019	Malaysia Masters	Super 500	(Thailand) Sapsiree Taerattanachai	(Japan) Yuta Watanabe (Japan) Arisa Higashino	18–21, 18–21	(silver) Runner-up	
2019	Singapore Open	Super 500	(Thailand) Sapsiree Taerattanachai	(Malaysia) Tan Kian Meng (Malaysia) Lai Pei Jing	21–14, 21–6	(gold) Winner	
2019	Korea Open	Super 500	(Thailand) Sapsiree Taerattanachai	(China) Zheng Siwei (China) Huang Yaqiong	21–14, 21–13	(gold) Winner	
2019	Macau Open	Super 300	(Thailand) Sapsiree Taerattanachai	(Chinese Taipei) Wang Chi-lin (Chinese Taipei) Cheng Chi-ya	21–11, 21–8	(gold) Winner	
2020	All England Open	Super 1000	(Thailand) Sapsiree Taerattanachai	(Indonesia) Praveen Jordan (Indonesia) Melati Daeva Oktavianti	15–21, 21–17, 8–21	(silver) Runner-up	
2020 (I)	Thailand Open	Super 1000	(Thailand) Sapsiree Taerattanachai	(Indonesia) Praveen Jordan (Indonesia) Melati Daeva Oktavianti	21–3, 20–22, 21–18	(gold) Winner	
2020 (II)	Thailand Open	Super 1000	(Thailand) Sapsiree Taerattanachai	(South Korea) Seo Seung-jae (South Korea) Chae Yoo-jung	21–16, 22–20	(gold) Winner	
2020	BWF World Tour Finals	World Tour Finals	(Thailand) Sapsiree Taerattanachai	(South Korea) Seo Seung-jae (South Korea) Chae Yoo-jung	21–18, 8–21, 21–8	(gold) Winner	
2021	Denmark Open	Super 1000	(Thailand) Sapsiree Taerattanachai	(Japan) Yuta Watanabe (Japan) Arisa Higashino	18–21, 9–21	(silver) Runner-up	
2021	Hylo Open	Super 500	(Thailand) Sapsiree Taerattanachai	(Indonesia) Praveen Jordan (Indonesia) Melati Daeva Oktavianti	22–20, 21–14	(gold) Winner	
2021	Indonesia Masters	Super 750	(Thailand) Sapsiree Taerattanachai	(Hong Kong) Tang Chun Man (Hong Kong) Tse Ying Suet	21–11, 21–12	(gold) Winner	
2021	Indonesia Open	Super 1000	(Thailand) Sapsiree Taerattanachai	(Japan) Yuta Watanabe (Japan) Arisa Higashino	21–12, 21–13	(gold) Winner	
2021	BWF World Tour Finals	World Tour Finals	(Thailand) Sapsiree Taerattanachai	(Japan) Yuta Watanabe (Japan) Arisa Higashino	21–19, 21–11	(gold) Winner	
2022	German Open	Super 300	(Thailand) Sapsiree Taerattanachai	(China) Ou Xuanyi (China) Huang Yaqiong	21–11, 21–9	(gold) Winner	
2022	Thailand Open	Super 500	(Thailand) Sapsiree Taerattanachai	(China) Zheng Siwei (China) Huang Yaqiong	12–21, 21–18, 14–21	(silver) Runner-up	
2022	Malaysia Open	Super 750	(Thailand) Sapsiree Taerattanachai	(China) Zheng Siwei (China) Huang Yaqiong	13–21, 18–21	(silver) Runner-up	
2022	Singapore Open	Super 500	(Thailand) Sapsiree Taerattanachai	(China) Wang Yilyu (China) Huang Dongping	21–12, 21–17	(gold) Winner	
2022	Japan Open	Super 750	(Thailand) Sapsiree Taerattanachai	(Japan) Yuta Watanabe (Japan) Arisa Higashino	16–21, 23–21, 21–18	(gold) Winner	
2022	BWF World Tour Finals	World Tour Finals	(Thailand) Sapsiree Taerattanachai	(China) Zheng Siwei (China) Huang Yaqiong	19–21, 21–18, 13–21	(silver) Runner-up	
2023	Malaysia Masters	Super 500	(Thailand) Sapsiree Taerattanachai	(China) Feng Yanzhe (China) Huang Dongping	16–21, 21–13, 21–18	(gold) Winner	
2023	Thailand Open	Super 500	(Thailand) Sapsiree Taerattanachai	(South Korea) Kim Won-ho (South Korea) Jeong Na-eun	21–11, 19–21, 20–22	(silver) Runner-up	
2023	Japan Open	Super 750	(Thailand) Sapsiree Taerattanachai	(Japan) Yuta Watanabe (Japan) Arisa Higashino	21–17, 16–21, 15–21	(silver) Runner-up	
2024	India Open	Super 750	(Thailand) Sapsiree Taerattanachai	(China) Jiang Zhenbang (China) Wei Yaxin	21–16, 21–16	(gold) Winner	
2024	Thailand Masters	Super 300	(Thailand) Sapsiree Taerattanachai	(Malaysia) Chen Tang Jie (Malaysia) Toh Ee Wei	21–12, 21–18	(gold) Winner	
2024	Thailand Open	Super 500	(Thailand) Sapsiree Taerattanachai	(China) Guo Xinwa (China) Chen Fanghui	21–12, 12–21, 18–21	(silver) Runner-up	
2024	Japan Masters	Super 500	(Thailand) Supissara Paewsampran	(France) Thom Gicquel (France) Delphine Delrue	21–16, 10–21, 21–17	(gold) Winner	
2024	Syed Modi International	Super 300	(Thailand) Supissara Paewsampran	(India) Dhruv Kapila (India) Tanisha Crasto	18–21, 21–14, 21–8	(gold) Winner	
2025	Malaysia Open	Super 1000	(Thailand) Supissara Paewsampran	(China) Feng Yanzhe (China) Huang Dongping	21–13, 19–21, 21–18	(gold) Winner	
2025	Thailand Masters	Super 300	(Thailand) Supissara Paewsampran	(Indonesia) Dejan Ferdinansyah (Indonesia) Siti Fadia Silva Ramadhanti	19–21, 21–17, 21–13	(gold) Winner	
2025	Singapore Open	Super 750	(Thailand) Supissara Paewsampran	(Hong Kong) Tang Chun Man (Hong Kong) Tse Ying Suet	21–16, 21–9	(gold) Winner	
2025	Indonesia Open	Super 1000	(Thailand) Supissara Paewsampran	(France) Thom Gicquel (France) Delphine Delrue	16–21, 18–21	(silver) Runner-up	
2025	Japan Open	Super 750	(Thailand) Supissara Paewsampran	(China) Jiang Zhenbang (China) Wei Yaxin	19–21, 21–16, 15–21	(silver) Runner-up	
2025	China Masters	Super 750	(Thailand) Supissara Paewsampran	(Malaysia) Chen Tang Jie (Malaysia) Toh Ee Wei	21–8, 21–17	(gold) Winner	
2025	French Open	Super 750	(Thailand) Supissara Paewsampran	(China) Feng Yanzhe (China) Huang Dongping	25–27, 12–21	(silver) Runner-up	
2025	Japan Masters	Super 500	(Thailand) Supissara Paewsampran	(France) Thom Gicquel (France) Delphine Delrue	21–18, 14–21, 21–18	(gold) Winner	
2026	India Open	Super 750	(Thailand) Supissara Paewsampran	(Denmark) Mathias Christiansen (Denmark) Alexandra Bøje	19–21, 25–23, 21–18	(gold) Winner	

=== BWF Superseries (1 runner-up) ===
The BWF Superseries, which was launched on 14 December 2006 and implemented in 2007, was a series of elite badminton tournaments, sanctioned by the Badminton World Federation (BWF). BWF Superseries levels were Superseries and Superseries Premier. A season of Superseries consisted of twelve tournaments around the world that had been introduced since 2011. Successful players were invited to the Superseries Finals, which were held at the end of each year.

Mixed doubles
Year	Tournament	Partner	Opponent	Score	Result	Ref.
2017	Singapore Open	(Thailand) Sapsiree Taerattanachai	(China) Lu Kai (China) Huang Yaqiong	21–19, 16–21, 11–21	(silver) Runner-up	

BWF Super Series Finals tournament
BWF Super Series Premier tournament
BWF Super Series tournament

=== BWF Grand Prix (1 title, 3 runners-up) ===
The BWF Grand Prix had two levels, the Grand Prix and Grand Prix Gold. It was a series of badminton tournaments sanctioned by the Badminton World Federation (BWF) and played between 2007 and 2017.

Mixed doubles
Year	Tournament	Partner	Opponent	Score	Result	Ref.
2016	Syed Modi International	(Thailand) Sapsiree Taerattanachai	(Indonesia) Praveen Jordan (Indonesia) Debby Susanto	25–23, 9–21, 16–21	(silver) Runner-up	
2016	Korea Masters	(Thailand) Sapsiree Taerattanachai	(South Korea) Ko Sung-hyun (South Korea) Kim Ha-na	19–21, 16–21	(silver) Runner-up	
2017	Thailand Masters	(Thailand) Sapsiree Taerattanachai	(China) Zhang Nan (China) Li Yinhui	11–21, 22–20, 13–21	(silver) Runner-up	
2017	Swiss Open	(Thailand) Sapsiree Taerattanachai	(Indonesia) Praveen Jordan (Indonesia) Debby Susanto	21–18, 21–15	(gold) Winner	

BWF Grand Prix Gold tournament
BWF Grand Prix tournament

=== BWF International Challenge/Series (2 runners-up) ===
Men's doubles
Year	Tournament	Partner	Opponent	Score	Result	Ref.
2014	Smiling Fish International	(Thailand) Kittinupong Kedren	(Thailand) Watchara Buranakuea (Thailand) Trawut Potieng	21–12, 18–21, 14–21	(silver) Runner-up	
2016	Polish Open	(Thailand) Kittinupong Kedren	(Indonesia) Hardianto (Indonesia) Kenas Adi Haryanto	5–21, 21–18, 15–21	(silver) Runner-up	

Commonwealth Youth Games tournament
BWF International Series tournament
