= Tse Ying Suet =

Hong Kong badminton player (born 1991)

Tse Ying Suet 謝影雪
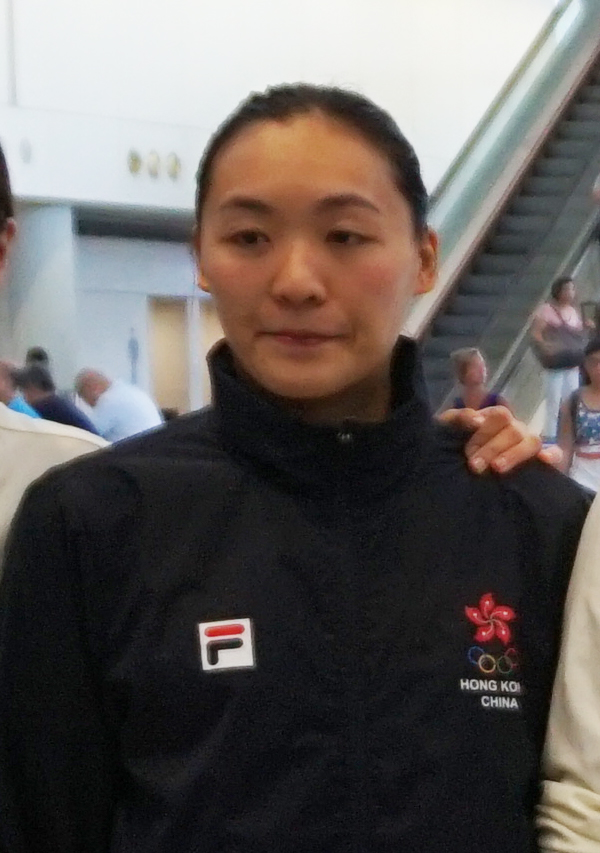

Personal information
- Born: 9 November 1991 (age 35) Hong Kong
- Height: 1.66 m (5 ft 5 in)
- Weight: 66 kg (146 lb)

Sport
- Country: Hong Kong
- Sport: Badminton
- Handedness: Left
- Coached by: Jeremy Gan

Women's & mixed doubles
- Highest ranking: 47 (WS 22 March 2012); 9 (WD with Poon Lok Yan, 7 August 2013); 2 (XD with Tang Chun Man, 28 June 2018)
- Current ranking: 15 (XD with Tang Chun Man, 10 November 2026)
- BWF profile
Medal record
Women's badminton
Representing Hong Kong
World Championships
Bronze medal – third place	2018 Nanjing	Mixed doubles
Bronze medal – third place	2021 Huelva	Mixed doubles
Asian Games
Silver medal – second place	2018 Jakarta–Palembang	Mixed doubles
Asia Championships
Gold medal – first place	2025 Ningbo	Mixed doubles
Asia Mixed Team Championships
Bronze medal – third place	2019 Hong Kong	Mixed team
East Asian Games
Bronze medal – third place	2009 Hong Kong	Women's team
Bronze medal – third place	2013 Tianjin	Women's team
World Junior Championships
Bronze medal – third place	2009 Alor Setar	Girls' doubles
Asian Junior Championships
Bronze medal – third place	2008 Kuala Lumpur	Girls' doubles
Bronze medal – third place	2008 Kuala Lumpur	Mixed team

Tse Ying Suet
- Traditional Chinese: 謝影雪
- Simplified Chinese: 谢影雪
Transcriptions
Standard Mandarin
- Hanyu Pinyin: Xiè Yǐngxuě
Yue: Cantonese
- Jyutping: ze^{6} jing^{2} syut^{3}

Tse Ying Suet (Chinese: 謝影雪; Jyutping: ze^{6} jing^{2} syut^{3}, born 9 November 1991) is a Hong Kong badminton player. She was a gold medalist in the 2025 Asian Championships, a silver medalist in the 2018 Asian Games, and two-time bronze medalists in the World Championships.

Tse is a four-time Olympian. She competed at the 2012 and 2016 Summer Olympics in the women's doubles event (with Poon Lok Yan), and the 2020 and 2024 Summer Olympics in the mixed doubles event (with Tang Chun Man).

== Career ==
In 2012, she won the women's doubles title at the Japan Open tournament with Poon Lok Yan by beating four Japanese pairs consecutively.

Tse competed at the 2012 and 2016 Summer Olympics with Poon Lok Yan in the women's doubles event, but did not advance to the knockout stage.

Tse competed at the 2020 Summer Olympics in Tokyo, held in 2021 due to the COVID-19 pandemic. Partnered with Tang Chun Man, she finished fourth in the mixed doubles, defeated by the Japanese pair Yuta Watanabe and Arisa Higashino in the bronze medal match. Tse and Cheung Ka-long were the flagbearers for the Hong Kong team at the Olympic opening ceremony.

In the 2024 Summer Olympics mixed doubles event, Tang and Tse advanced to the quarterfinals but were defeated by Chae Yoo-jung and Seo Seung-jae.

In April 2025, after taking a break from each other after the 2024 BWF World Tour Finals, Tang and Tse won the mixed doubled title in the Asian Championships by overcoming home favorites Jiang Zhenbang and Wei Yaxin in the semi-final, which was their first victory over the world number 1 pair.

== Achievements ==
=== BWF World Championships ===
Mixed doubles
Year	Venue	Partner	Opponent	Score	Result
2018	Nanjing Youth Olympic Sports Park; Nanjing, China	(Hong Kong) Tang Chun Man	(China) Wang Yilyu (China) Huang Dongping	6–21, 10–21	Bronze
2021	Palacio de los Deportes Carolina Marín; Huelva, Spain	(Hong Kong) Tang Chun Man	(Thailand) Dechapol Puavaranukroh (Thailand) Sapsiree Taerattanachai	21–15, 7–21, 10–21	Bronze

=== Asian Games ===
Mixed doubles
Year	Venue	Partner	Opponent	Score	Result
2018	Istora Gelora Bung Karno; Jakarta, Indonesia	(Hong Kong) Tang Chun Man	(China) Zheng Siwei (China) Huang Yaqiong	8–21, 15–21	Silver

=== Asian Championships ===
Mixed doubles
Year	Venue	Partner	Opponent	Score	Result	Ref.
2025	Ningbo Olympic Sports Center Gymnasium; Ningbo, China	(Hong Kong) Tang Chun Man	(Japan) Hiroki Midorikawa (Japan) Natsu Saito	21–15, 17–21, 21–13	Gold	

=== BWF World Junior Championships ===
Girls' doubles
Year	Venue	Partner	Opponent	Score	Result
2009	Stadium Sultan Abdul Halim; Alor Setar, Malaysia	(Hong Kong) Poon Lok Yan	(Indonesia) Suci Rizki Andini (Indonesia) Tiara Rosalia Nuraidah	21–18, 9–21, 18–21	Bronze

=== Asian Junior Championships ===
Girls' doubles
Year	Venue	Partner	Opponent	Score	Result
2008	Stadium Juara; Kuala Lumpur, Malaysia	(Hong Kong) Chan Tsz Ka	(China) Xie Jing (China) Zhong Qianxin	14–21, 15–21	Bronze

=== BWF World Tour (6 titles, 6 runners-up) ===
The BWF World Tour, which was announced on 19 March 2017 and implemented in 2018, is a series of elite badminton tournaments sanctioned by the Badminton World Federation (BWF). The BWF World Tours are divided into levels of World Tour Finals, Super 1000, Super 750, Super 500, Super 300 (part of the HSBC World Tour), and the BWF Tour Super 100.

Mixed doubles
Year	Tournament	Level	Partner	Opponent	Score	Result
2018	Malaysia Masters	Super 500	(Hong Kong) Tang Chun Man	(China) Zheng Siwei (China) Huang Yaqiong	19–21, 22–20, 21–18	(gold) Winner
2018	Macau Open	Super 300	(Hong Kong) Tang Chun Man	(Hong Kong) Lee Chun Hei (Hong Kong) Chau Hoi Wah	21–14, 21–15	(gold) Winner
2019	Chinese Taipei Open	Super 300	(Hong Kong) Tang Chun Man	(South Korea) Seo Seung-jae (South Korea) Chae Yoo-jung	21–18, 21–10	(gold) Winner
2019	Korea Masters	Super 300	(Hong Kong) Tang Chun Man	(Malaysia) Goh Soon Huat (Malaysia) Shevon Jemie Lai	21–14, 21–15	(gold) Winner
2021	Indonesia Masters	Super 750	(Hong Kong) Tang Chun Man	(Thailand) Dechapol Puavaranukroh (Thailand) Sapsiree Taerattanachai	11–21, 12–21	(silver) Runner-up
2023	Hong Kong Open	Super 500	(Hong Kong) Tang Chun Man	(China) Guo Xinwa (China) Wei Yaxin	13–21, 19–21	(silver) Runner-up
2023	French Open	Super 750	(Hong Kong) Tang Chun Man	(China) Jiang Zhenbang (China) Wei Yaxin	17–21, 21–15, 12–21	(silver) Runner-up
2023	Hylo Open	Super 300	(Hong Kong) Tang Chun Man	(Indonesia) Rehan Naufal Kusharjanto (Indonesia) Lisa Ayu Kusumawati	15–21, 21–15, 21–14	(gold) Winner
2024	German Open	Super 300	(Hong Kong) Tang Chun Man	(South Korea) Kim Won-ho (South Korea) Jeong Na-eun	21–13, 21–19	(gold) Winner
2024	Japan Open	Super 750	(Hong Kong) Tang Chun Man	(China) Jiang Zhenbang (China) Wei Yaxin	12–21, 12–21	(silver) Runner-up
2025	Singapore Open	Super 750	(Hong Kong) Tang Chun Man	(Thailand) Dechapol Puavaranukroh (Thailand) Supissara Paewsampran	16–21, 9–21	(silver) Runner-up
2026	Japan Open	Super 750	(Hong Kong) Tang Chun Man	(China) Feng Yanzhe (China) Huang Dongping	14–21, 21–14, 15–21	(silver) Runner-up

=== BWF Superseries (2 titles, 1 runner-up) ===
The BWF Superseries, which was launched on 14 December 2006 and implemented in 2007, was a series of elite badminton tournaments, sanctioned by the Badminton World Federation (BWF). BWF Superseries levels were Superseries and Superseries Premier. A season of Superseries consisted of twelve tournaments around the world that had been introduced since 2011. Successful players were invited to the Superseries Finals, which were held at the end of each year.

Women's doubles
Year	Tournament	Partner	Opponent	Score	Result
2012	Japan Open	(Hong Kong) Poon Lok Yan	(Japan) Shizuka Matsuo (Japan) Mami Naito	21–17, 22–20	(gold) Winner

Mixed doubles
Year	Tournament	Partner	Opponent	Score	Result
2017	Denmark Open	(Hong Kong) Tang Chun Man	(China) Zheng Siwei (China) Chen Qingchen	24–22, 19–21, 23–21	(gold) Winner
2017	Dubai World Superseries Finals	(Hong Kong) Tang Chun Man	(China) Zheng Siwei (China) Chen Qingchen	15–21, 20–22	(silver) Runner-up

BWF Super Series Finals tournament
BWF Super Series Premier tournament
BWF Super Series tournament

=== BWF Grand Prix (2 titles, 7 runner-up) ===
The BWF Grand Prix had two levels, the Grand Prix and Grand Prix Gold. It was a series of badminton tournaments sanctioned by the Badminton World Federation (BWF) and played between 2007 and 2017.

Women's doubles
Year	Tournament	Partner	Opponent	Score	Result
2009	New Zealand Open	(Hong Kong) Chan Tsz Ka	(Indonesia) Anneke Feinya Agustin (Indonesia) Annisa Wahyuni	19–21, 17–21	(silver) Runner-up
2015	Bitburger Open	(Hong Kong) Poon Lok Yan	(China) Tang Yuanting (China) Yu Yang	10–21, 18–21	(silver) Runner-up
2015	Macau Open	(Hong Kong) Poon Lok Yan	(South Korea) Jung Kyung-eun (South Korea) Shin Seung-chan	21–18, 15–15 retired	(silver) Runner-up
2017	Malaysia Masters	(Hong Kong) Poon Lok Yan	(Thailand) Jongkolphan Kititharakul (Thailand) Rawinda Prajongjai	17–21, 9–21	(silver) Runner-up

Mixed doubles
Year	Tournament	Partner	Opponent	Score	Result
2010	German Open	(Hong Kong) Yohan Hadikusumo Wiratama	(England) Robert Blair (Scotland) Imogen Bankier	15–5, retired	(gold) Winner
2010	Vietnam Open	(Hong Kong) Yohan Hadikusumo Wiratama	(China) He Hanbin (China) Ma Jin	18–21, 11–21	(silver) Runner-up
2016	Thailand Open	(Hong Kong) Tang Chun Man	(Malaysia) Tan Kian Meng (Malaysia) Lai Pei Jing	16–21, 20–22	(silver) Runner-up
2016	Chinese Taipei Masters	(Hong Kong) Tang Chun Man	(Japan) Ryota Taohata (Japan) Koharu Yonemoto	11–3, 11–7, 14–12	(gold) Winner
2016	Macau Open	(Hong Kong) Tang Chun Man	(China) Zhang Nan (China) Li Yinhui	19–21, 15–21	(silver) Runner-up

BWF Grand Prix Gold tournament
BWF Grand Prix tournament

=== BWF International Challenge/Series (3 titles, 2 runner-up) ===
Women's doubles
Year	Tournament	Partner	Opponent	Score	Result
2011	New Zealand International	(Hong Kong) Poon Lok Yan	(Japan) Yuriko Miki (Japan) Koharu Yonemoto	21–16, 16–21, 20–22	(silver) Runner-up
2013	Vietnam International	(Hong Kong) Poon Lok Yan	(Thailand) Narissapat Lam (Thailand) Puttita Supajirakul	18–21, 21–17, 11–21	(silver) Runner-up

Mixed doubles
Year	Tournament	Partner	Opponent	Score	Result
2010	Singapore International	(Hong Kong) Yohan Hadikusumo Wiratama	(South Korea) Lee Jae-jin (South Korea) Yim Jae-eun	21–13, 21–19	(gold) Winner
2013	Austrian International	(Hong Kong) Chan Yun Lung	(Hong Kong) Lee Chun Hei (Hong Kong) Chau Hoi Wah	15–21, 21–16, 21–16	(gold) Winner
2013	Vietnam International	(Hong Kong) Chan Yun Lung	(Hong Kong) Lee Chun Hei (Hong Kong) Chau Hoi Wah	21–4, 17–21, 21–17	(gold) Winner

BWF International Challenge tournament
BWF International Series tournament
BWF Future Series tournament
