= Tan Kian Meng =

Malaysian badminton player

Tan Kian Meng 陈健铭
Personal information
- Born: 1 June 1994 (age 32) Johor Bahru, Johor, Malaysia
- Height: 1.85 m (6 ft 1 in)

Sport
- Country: Malaysia
- Sport: Badminton
- Handedness: Right
- Coached by: Rosman Razak

Men's & mixed doubles
- Highest ranking: 39 (MD with Tan Wee Kiong, 31 January 2023); 5 (XD with Lai Pei Jing, 20 December 2022)
- Current ranking: 17 (XD with Lai Pei Jing 27 May 2025)
- BWF profile
Medal record
Men's badminton
Representing Malaysia
Sudirman Cup
Bronze medal – third place	2023 Suzhou	Mixed team
Commonwealth Games
Gold medal – first place	2022 Birmingham	Mixed team
Bronze medal – third place	2022 Birmingham	Mixed doubles
SEA Games
Silver medal – second place	2019 Philippines	Men's team
Bronze medal – third place	2019 Philippines	Mixed doubles
Asian Junior Championships
Bronze medal – third place	2012 Gimcheon	Mixed team

Tan Kian Meng (simplified Chinese: 陈健铭; traditional Chinese: 陳健銘; pinyin: Chén Jiànmíng; Pe̍h-ōe-jī: Tân Kiān-bêng, born 1 June 1994) is a Malaysian badminton player who specializes in the doubles events. He is currently playing with Lai Pei Jing in mixed doubles. Originally a singles player, he switched to play in the doubles events since August 2014 due to slow career progress.

== Achievements ==
=== Commonwealth Games ===
Mixed doubles
Year	Venue	Partner	Opponent	Score	Result
2022	National Exhibition Centre; Birmingham, England	(Malaysia) Lai Pei Jing	(Scotland) Adam Hall (Scotland) Julie MacPherson	21–15, 21–17	Bronze

=== SEA Games ===
Mixed doubles
Year	Venue	Partner	Opponent	Score	Result
2019	Muntinlupa Sports Complex; Metro Manila, Philippines	(Malaysia) Lai Pei Jing	(Indonesia) Praveen Jordan (Indonesia) Melati Daeva Oktavianti	16–21, 18–21	Bronze

=== BWF World Tour (1 title, 1 runner-up) ===
The BWF World Tour, which was announced on 19 March 2017 and implemented in 2018, is a series of elite badminton tournaments sanctioned by the Badminton World Federation (BWF). The BWF World Tour is divided into levels of World Tour Finals, Super 1000, Super 750, Super 500, Super 300 (part of the HSBC World Tour), and the BWF Tour Super 100.

Mixed doubles
Year	Tournament	Level	Partner	Opponent	Score	Result
2019	Singapore Open	Super 500	(Malaysia) Lai Pei Jing	(Thailand) Dechapol Puavaranukroh (Thailand) Sapsiree Taerattanachai	14–21, 6–21	(silver) Runner-up
2022	Korea Open	Super 500	(Malaysia) Lai Pei Jing	(South Korea) Ko Sung-hyun (South Korea) Eom Hye-won	21–15, 21–18	(gold) Winner

=== BWF Grand Prix (3 titles, 3 runners-up) ===
The BWF Grand Prix had two levels, the Grand Prix and Grand Prix Gold. It was a series of badminton tournaments sanctioned by the Badminton World Federation (BWF) and played between 2007 and 2017.

Mixed doubles
Year	Tournament	Partner	Opponent	Score	Result
2016	Malaysia Masters	(Malaysia) Lai Pei Jing	(China) Zheng Siwei (China) Li Yinhui	14–21, 19–21	(silver) Runner-up
2016	Chinese Taipei Open	(Malaysia) Lai Pei Jing	(China) Zheng Siwei (China) Chen Qingchen	13–21, 16–21	(silver) Runner-up
2016	Vietnam Open	(Malaysia) Lai Pei Jing	(Indonesia) Alfian Eko Prasetya (Indonesia) Annisa Saufika	21–16, 21–11	(gold) Winner
2016	Indonesian Masters	(Malaysia) Lai Pei Jing	(Indonesia) Ronald Alexander (Indonesia) Melati Daeva Oktavianti	16–21, 17–21	(silver) Runner-up
2016	Thailand Open	(Malaysia) Lai Pei Jing	(Hong Kong) Tang Chun Man (Hong Kong) Tse Ying Suet	21–16, 22–20	(gold) Winner
2017	Malaysia Masters	(Malaysia) Lai Pei Jing	(Malaysia) Goh Soon Huat (Malaysia) Shevon Jamie Lai	21–17, 21–9	(gold) Winner

BWF Grand Prix Gold tournament
BWF Grand Prix tournament

=== BWF International Challenge/Series (3 runners-up) ===
Men's doubles
Year	Tournament	Partner	Opponent	Score	Result
2021	Dutch Open	(Malaysia) Tan Wee Kiong	(Singapore) Terry Hee (Singapore) Loh Kean Hean	14–21, 21–18, 20–22	(silver) Runner-up

Mixed doubles
Year	Tournament	Partner	Opponent	Score	Result
2015	Vietnam International Series	(Malaysia) Peck Yen Wei	(Indonesia) Rian Swastedian (Indonesia) Masita Mahmudin	13–21, 21–19, 17–21	(silver) Runner-up
2016	Polish Open	(Malaysia) Lai Pei Jing	(Poland) Robert Mateusiak (Poland) Nadieżda Zięba	11–21, 16–21	(silver) Runner-up

BWF International Challenge tournament
BWF International Series tournament
