= 2014 India Open Grand Prix Gold =

Tournament details
- Dates: January 21, 2014 - January 26, 2014
- Total prize money: US$120,000
- Venue: Babu Banarasi Das Indoor Stadium
- Location: Lucknow, India

The 2014 India Grand Prix Gold was the first tournament of the 2014 BWF Grand Prix Gold and Grand Prix. The tournament was held in Babu Banarasi Das Indoor Stadium, Lucknow, India from 21 January until 26 January 2014 and had a total purse of $120,000.

== Players by nation ==
Nation	First Round	Second Round	Third Round	Quarterfinals	Semifinals	Final
(India)	63	28	7	8	3	2
(Malaysia)	7	11	1	4	2	
(Iraq)	2					
(Indonesia)	1	1		5	1	
(Sweden)	1					
(Thailand)		3		2	2	
(Russia)		1				
(Israel)		1				
(France)		1				
(Switzerland)		1				
(China)				1	2	3

== Men's singles ==
=== Seeds ===
1. (India) Kashyap Parupalli (third round)
2. (India) Ajay Jayaram (third round)
3. (India) R. M. V. Gurusaidutt (third round)
4. (India) Anand Pawar (third round)
5. (France) Brice Leverdez (second round)
6. (India) Srikanth Kidambi (final)
7. (India) Prannoy Kumar (semi-final)
8. (India) Sourabh Varma (third round)
9. (China) Xue Song (champion)
10. (Israel) Misha Zilberman (second round)
11. (India) B. Sai Praneeth (quarter-final)
12. (Malaysia) Zulfadli Zulkiffli (quarter-final)
13. (Malaysia) Iskandar Zulkarnain Zainuddin (quarter-final)
14. (India) Arvind Bhat (third round)
15. (India) Chetan Anand (third round)
16. (India) Subhankar Dey (quarter-final)

=== Finals ===
Quarterfinals
12	(Malaysia) Zulfadli Zulkiffli	19	14
7	(India) Prannoy Kumar	21	21
11	(India) B. Sai Praneeth	18	22	12
6	(India) Srikanth Kidambi	21	20	21
(India) Aditya Prakash	21	18	21
13	(Malaysia) Iskandar Zulkarnain Zainuddin	19	21	16
9	(China) Xue Song	21	21
16	(India) Subhankar Dey	18	15

Semifinals
7	(India) Prannoy Kumar	18	20
6	(India) Srikanth Kidambi	21	22
(India) Aditya Prakash	10	7
9	(China) Xue Song	21	21

Final
6	(India) Srikanth Kidambi	21	19	13
9	(China) Xue Song	16	21	21

=== Top half ===
==== Section 1 ====
First Round
1	(India) K Parupalli	21	21
(India) A Sridhar	14	16
(India) V G Prasad	12	14
(Malaysia) Chong YH	21	21
12	(Malaysia) Zf Zulkiffli	21	21
(India) H Dani	18	17
Q1	(India) S Agrawal	6	10
(India) N. V. S. Vijetha	21	21

Second Round
1	(India) K Parupalli	21	21
(Malaysia) Chong YH	10	12
12	(Malaysia) Zf Zulkiffli	21	21
(India) N. V. S. Vijetha	17	16

Third Round
1	(India) K Parupalli	16	12
12	(Malaysia) Zf Zulkiffli	21	21

==== Section 2 ====
First Round
7	(India) P Kumar	21	21
(India) M Kamat	17	12
(India) P S Chouhan	16	13
(Malaysia) N M A Ayub	21	21
15	(India) C Anand	21	21
(Malaysia) M A H Nurizwan	9	11
(India) S Nandaluri	21	21
(Malaysia) Zh Zulkiffli	15	13

Second Round
7	(India) P Kumar	21	19	21
(Malaysia) N M A Ayub	16	21	9
15	(India) C Anand	21	21
(India) S Nandaluri	9	7

Third Round
7	(India) P Kumar	21	21
15	(India) C Anand	14	10

==== Section 3 ====
First Round
3	(India) R M V Gurusaidutt	21	21
(India) V Vasudevan	10	10
(India) V Saini	21	16	21
(Malaysia) Yeoh KE	16	21	12
11	(India) B S Praneeth	21	21
Q3	(India) A Prakash	7	4
PFQ	(India) S Kapoor
BYE

Second Round
3	(India) R M V Gurusaidutt	21	21
(India) V Saini	11	11
11	(India) B S Praneeth	21	21
PFQ	(India) S Kapoor	10	9

Third Round
3	(India) R M V Gurusaidutt	21	9	16
11	(India) B S Praneeth	15	21	21

==== Section 4 ====
First Round
6	(India) S Kidambi	21	21
(India) M Behal	15	15
(Malaysia) Tan KM	21	21
(India) M Gupta	12	11
14	(India) A Bhat	21	21
Q8	(India) A Yadav	18	16
(India) P Jolly	2	0^{r}
(Malaysia) Soong JV	21	0

Second Round
6	(India) S Kidambi	21	22
(Malaysia) Tan KM	16	20
14	(India) A Bhat	21	19	21
(Malaysia) Soong JV	14	21	14

Third Round
6	(India) S Kidambi	19	23	24
14	(India) A Bhat	21	21	22

=== Bottom half ===
==== Section 5 ====
First Round
(Malaysia) Jian AW	15	13
(India) A Prakash	21	21
(India) A Kumar	11	11
10	(Israel) M Zilberman	21	21
(Malaysia) Goh SH	23	21
(India) R Yadav	21	17
(India) K Chahal	10	21	17
5	(France) B Leverdez	21	18	21

Second Round
(India) A Prakash	22	20
10	(Israel) M Zilberman	10	13^{r}
(Malaysia) Goh SH	21	21
5	(France) B Leverdez	17	18

Third Round
(India) A Prakash	21	14	21
(Malaysia) Goh SH	19	21	13

==== Section 6 ====
First Round
Q6	(India) S Rawat	16	21	21
(India) A Manota	21	18	19
(India) N D'Sa	14	10
13	(Malaysia) I Zainuddin	21	21
(India) A Sharma
(Iraq) Y Azad	wo
(India) S Verma	16	11
4	(India) A Pawar	21	21

Second Round
Q6	(India) S Rawat	11	11
13	(Malaysia) I Zainuddin	21	21
(India) A Sharma	7	8
4	(India) A Pawar	21	21

Third Round
13	(Malaysia) I Zainuddin	22	21
4	(India) A Pawar	20	11

==== Section 7 ====
First Round
(India) A Joshi	21	21
Q7	(India) P Malik	13	11
(India) K Kumar	8	10
9	(China) Xue S	21	21
(India) Dilshad K.	11	15
Q2	(India) A Yelegar	21	21
(India) S Rayadurga	14	11
8	(India) S Varma	21	21

Second Round
(India) A Joshi	9	12
9	(China) Xue S	21	21
Q2	(India) A Yelegar	15	11
8	(India) S Varma	21	21

Third Round
9	(China) Xue S	21	14	21
8	(India) S Varma	13	21	17

==== Section 8 ====
First Round
Q5	(India) K Dharmamer	21	21
(India) O Bansal	11	17
(India) A Singh	21	12	19
16	(India) S Dey	18	21	21
(India) D Khatri	13	18
(Malaysia) Soo TZ	21	21
(India) V Reddy	12	12
2	(India) A Jayaram	21	21

Second Round
Q5	(India) K Dharmamer	14	21	9
16	(India) S Dey	21	9	21
(Malaysia) Soo TZ	25	15
2	(India) A Jayaram	27	21

Third Round
16	(India) S Dey	21	21
2	(India) A Jayaram	19	17

== Women's singles ==
=== Seeds ===
1. (India) Saina Nehwal (champion)
2. (India) P. V. Sindhu (final)
3. (Thailand) Nichaon Jindapon (withdrew)
4. (Indonesia) Lindaweni Fanetri (semi-final)
5. (Indonesia) Bellaetrix Manuputty (quarter-final)
6. (China) Deng Xuan (semi-final)
7. (Indonesia) Hera Desi (quarter-final)
8. (China) Suo Di (withdrew)

=== Finals ===
Semifinals
1	(India) Saina Nehwal	21	17	21
6	(China) Deng Xuan	14	21	19
4	(Indonesia) Lindaweni Fanetri	6	21	17
2	(India) P. V. Sindhu	21	12	21

Final
1	(India) Saina Nehwal	21	21
2	(India) P. V. Sindhu	14	17

=== Top half ===
==== Section 1 ====
First Round
1	(India) S Nehwal	21	21
(Sweden) M Petersen	7	9
(Russia) N Perminova	21	21
(India) J R Kunnath	13	19
5	(Indonesia) B Manuputty	21	21
(India) R Pillai	14	6
(India) D Nair	21	21
Q3	(India) R Sachdev	11	9

Second Round
1	(India) S Nehwal	21	21
(Russia) N Perminova	5	10
5	(Indonesia) B Manuputty	21	21
(India) D Nair	17	14

Quarterfinals
1	(India) S Nehwal	21	21
5	(Indonesia) B Manuputty	15	15

==== Section 2 ====
First Round
PFQ	(India) G R Shivani	17	15
(Malaysia) Tee JY	21	21
(Malaysia) S Saniru	5	21	15
(India) T Lad	21	16	21
6	(China) Deng X	21	21
Q4	(India) S Mundada	3	5
Q2	(India) S Dasgupta	15	15
(India) S Rane	21	21

Second Round
(Malaysia) Tee JY	21	21
(India) T Lad	15	17
6	(China) Deng X	21	21
(India) S Rane	8	13

Quarterfinals
(Malaysia) Tee JY	11	7
6	(China) Deng X	21	21

=== Bottom half ===
==== Section 3 ====
First Round
(India) M Sahdev	13	6
(Thailand) N Saengchote	21	21
(India) A Pantawane	21	21
PFQ	(India) S Chhabra	7	16
PFQ	(India) M Dhainje	17	18
(India) S Gokhale	21	21
(India) A S Sunil	11	10
4	(Indonesia) L Fanetri	21	21

Second Round
(Thailand) N Saengchote	13	11
(India) A Pantawane	21	21
(India) S Gokhale	11	16
4	(Indonesia) L Fanetri	21	21

Quarterfinals
(India) A Pantawane	10	7
4	(Indonesia) L Fanetri	21	21

==== Section 4 ====
First Round
PFQ	(India) J Dewangan	16	21	18
Q1	(India) S Hasini	21	16	21
(India) P C Thulasi	17	7
7	(Indonesia) H Desi	21	21
(Switzerland) S Jaquet	21	21
(India) T Murgunde	17	14
(Malaysia) Yang LL	19	22
2	(India) P V Sindhu	21	24

Second Round
Q1	(India) S Hasini	5	9
7	(Indonesia) H Desi	21	21
(Switzerland) S Jaquet	19	5
2	(India) P V Sindhu	21	21

Quarterfinals
7	(Indonesia) H Desi	11	13
2	(India) P V Sindhu	21	21

== Men's doubles ==
=== Seeds ===
1. (Indonesia) Marcus Fernaldi Gideon / Markis Kido (withdrew)
2. (India) Pranav Chopra / Akshay Dewalkar (semi-final)
3. (India) Manu Attri / B. Sumeeth Reddy (quarter-final)
4. (China) Li Junhui / Liu Yuchen (champion)
5. (Indonesia) Fran Kurniawan / Bona Septano (quarter-final)
6. (Indonesia) Andrei Adistia / Hendra Aprida Gunawan (quarter-final)
7. (Malaysia) Chooi Kah Ming / Teo Ee Yi (second round)
8. (China) Huang Kaixiang / Zheng Siwei (final)

=== Finals ===
Semifinals
(Thailand) Songphon Anugritayawon (Thailand) Pakkawat Vilailak	18	12
8	(China) Huang Kaixiang (China) Zheng Siwei	21	21
4	(China) Li Junhui (China) Liu Yuchen	21	21
2	(India) Pranav Chopra (India) Akshay Dewalkar	18	15

Final
8	(China) Huang Kaixiang (China) Zheng Siwei	17	21	20
4	(China) Li Junhui (China) Liu Yuchen	21	19	22

=== Top half ===
==== Section 1 ====
First Round
PFQ	(India) R Muradia (India) V K Singh	13	17
(India) N Kidambi (India) T H N Babu	21	21
PFQ	(India) M R Manikandran (India) V Vasudevan	10	14
(India) T Kona (India) J Sanyal	21	21
7	(Malaysia) Chooi KM (Malaysia) Teo EY	21	21
(India) B K Kumar (India) P V K Reddy	10	15
(Thailand) S Anugritayawon (Thailand) P Vilailak	21	24
(India) M Gupta (India) V G Prasad	16	22

Second Round
(India) N Kidambi (India) T H N Babu	21	12	18
(India) T Kona (India) J Sanyal	18	21	21
7	(Malaysia) Chooi KM (Malaysia) Teo EY	21	16	14
(Thailand) S Anugritayawon (Thailand) P Vilailak	18	21	21

Quarterfinals
(India) T Kona (India) J Sanyal	14	14
(Thailand) S Anugritayawon (Thailand) P Vilailak	21	21

==== Section 2 ====
First Round
3	(India) M Attri (India) B S Reddy	21	21
(India) A Ahlawat (India) B Chakraborty	10	15
(India) S Nandaluri (India) J B S Vidyadhar	17	17
Q3	(India) A Bennet (India) P H Suraj	21	21
8	(China) Huang KX (China) Zheng SW	21	21
(India) S Rathee (India) N Vashist	10	6
(India) M A Raju (India) K Singh	21	21
Q4	(India) P Bahatre (India) A Kulkarni	20	15

Second Round
3	(India) M Attri (India) B S Reddy	21	21
Q3	(India) A Bennet (India) P H Suraj	13	12
8	(China) Huang KX (China) Zheng SW	21	21
(India) M A Raju (India) K Singh	9	9

Quarterfinals
3	(India) M Attri (India) B S Reddy	17	13
8	(China) Huang KX (China) Zheng SW	21	21

=== Bottom half ===
==== Section 3 ====
First Round
Q2	(India) D G Prasad (India) V Prasad	16	21	21
(India) V Chawat (India) P S Chouhan	21	11	14
(India) M Jalal (India) R V Anand	2^{r}
5	(Indonesia) F Kurniawan (Indonesia) B Septano	1
(India) M Behal (India) V Khanwalkar
(Iraq) Y Azad (Malaysia) Yeoh KE	wo
(India) A Francis (India) A Vishnu	19	19
4	(China) Li JH (China) Liu YC	21	21

Second Round
Q2	(India) D G Prasad (India) V Prasad	27	17	17
5	(Indonesia) F Kurniawan (Indonesia) B Septano	25	21	21
(India) M Behal (India) V Khanwalkar	8	9
4	(China) Li JH (China) Liu YC	21	21

Quarterfinals
5	(Indonesia) F Kurniawan (Indonesia) B Septano	21	17	15
4	(China) Li JH (China) Liu YC	17	21	21

==== Section 4 ====
First Round
Q1	(India) B Venkatesh (India) A K R Malgari	21	19	17
(India) S Sanjeeth (India) J Yadav	15	21	21
(India) K Chahal (India) D Khatri	20	16
6	(Indonesia) A Adistia (Indonesia) H A Gunawan	21	21
(Malaysia) D I Devadass (Malaysia) Ong YS	21	21
(India) G G Raju (India) S Sharma	15	12
(India) K Dilshad (India) S Sunjith	16	14
2	(India) P Chopra (India) A Dewalkar	21	21

Second Round
(India) S Sanjeeth (India) J Yadav	16	16
6	(Indonesia) A Adistia (Indonesia) H A Gunawan	21	21
(Malaysia) D I Devadass (Malaysia) Ong YS	12	9
2	(India) P Chopra (India) A Dewalkar	21	21

Quarterfinals
6	(Indonesia) A Adistia (Indonesia) H A Gunawan	16	12
2	(India) P Chopra (India) A Dewalkar	21	21

== Women's doubles ==
=== Seeds ===
1. (Indonesia) Pia Zebadiah / Rizki Amelia Pradipta (quarter-final)
2. (Malaysia) Vivian Hoo Kah Mun / Woon Khe Wei (semi-final)
3. (Malaysia) Amelia Alicia Anscelly / Soong Fie Cho (second round)
4. (China) Huang Yaqiong / Yu Xiaohan (final)

=== Finals ===
Semifinals
(China) Chen Qingchen (China) Jia Yifan	21	21
(Thailand) Phataimas Muenwong (Thailand) Kilasu Ostermeyer	15	19
4	(China) Huang Yaqiong (China) Yu Xiaohan	21	21
2	(Malaysia) Vivian Hoo Kah Mun (Malaysia) Woon Khe Wei	18	12

Final
(China) Chen Qingchen (China) Jia Yifan	22	21	21
4	(China) Huang Yaqiong (China) Yu Xiaohan	24	19	11

=== Top half ===
==== Section 1 ====
First Round
1	(Indonesia) P Zebadiah (Indonesia) R Pradipta
BYE
(India) K Das (India) J Dewangan
BYE
(Malaysia) Lee MY (Malaysia) Lim YL
BYE
(China) Chen QC (China) Jia YF
BYE

Second Round
1	(Indonesia) P Zebadiah (Indonesia) R Pradipta	21	21
(India) K Das (India) J Dewangan	7	7
(Malaysia) Lee MY (Malaysia) Lim YL	18	14
(China) Chen QC (China) Jia YF	21	21

Quarterfinals
1	(Indonesia) P Zebadiah (Indonesia) R Pradipta	15	16
(China) Chen QC (China) Jia YF	21	21

==== Section 2 ====
First Round
3	(Malaysia) A Anscelly (Malaysia) Soong FC
BYE
(India) J Gutta (India) A Ponnappa
BYE
(India) D Nair (India) M Sahdev
BYE
(Thailand) P Muenwong (Thailand) K Ostermeyer
BYE

Second Round
3	(Malaysia) A Anscelly (Malaysia) Soong FC	19	21	19
(India) J Gutta (India) A Ponnappa	21	15	21
(India) D Nair (India) M Sahdev	18	10
(Thailand) P Muenwong (Thailand) K Ostermeyer	21	21

Quarterfinals
(India) J Gutta (India) A Ponnappa	14	11
(Thailand) P Muenwong (Thailand) K Ostermeyer	21	21

=== Bottom half ===
==== Section 3 ====
First Round
(India) P Gadre (India) S Reddy	wo
(Thailand) C Julrattanamanee (Thailand) N Saengchote
BYE
(Thailand) C Chaladchalam (Thailand) P Munkitamorn
BYE
(India) P Sawant (India) A Sunil
BYE
4	(China) Huang YQ (China) Yu XH

Second Round
(Thailand) C Julrattanamanee (Thailand) N Saengchote	17	17
(Thailand) C Chaladchalam (Thailand) P Munkitamorn	21	21
(India) P Sawant (India) A Sunil	10	18
4	(China) Huang YQ (China) Yu XH	21	21

Quarterfinals
(Thailand) C Chaladchalam (Thailand) P Munkitamorn	21	17	12
4	(China) Huang YQ (China) Yu XH	18	21	21

==== Section 4 ====
First Round
BYE
(India) P Antil (India) M Singh
BYE
(India) S Chhabra (India) E Kalia
BYE
(India) Ja Nashier (India) Jy Nashier
BYE
2	(Malaysia) V Hoo (Malaysia) Woon KW

Second Round
(India) P Antil (India) M Singh	5	5
(India) S Chhabra (India) E Kalia	21	21
(India) Ja Nashier (India) Jy Nashier	4	9
2	(Malaysia) V Hoo (Malaysia) Woon KW	21	21

Quarterfinals
(India) S Chhabra (India) E Kalia	11	6
2	(Malaysia) V Hoo (Malaysia) Woon KW	21	21

== Mixed doubles ==
=== Seeds ===
1. (Indonesia) Markis Kido / Pia Zebadiah (withdrew)
2. (Malaysia) Tan Aik Quan / Lai Pei Jing (quarter-final)
3. (Malaysia) Ong Jian Guo / Lim Yin Loo (second round)
4. (India) Tarun Kona / Ashwini Ponnappa (second round)

=== Finals ===
Semifinals
(China) Wang Yilu (China) Huang Yaqiong	21	21
(China) Liu Yuchen (China) Yu Xiaohan	10	11
(Malaysia) Mohd Lutfi Zaim Abdul Khalid (Malaysia) Soong Fie Cho	12	15
(China) Huang Kaixiang (China) Chen Qingchen	21	21

Final
(China) Wang Yilu (China) Huang Yaqiong	21	21
(China) Huang Kaixiang (China) Chen Qingchen	18	14

=== Top half ===
==== Section 1 ====
First Round
1	(Indonesia) M Kido (Indonesia) P Zebadiah
BYE
(India) A Dewalkar (India) P Gadre	wo
(India) A Vishnu (India) A Balan
(China) Wang YL (China) Huang YQ	21	21
(India) U Chakali (India) P Mudaliar	3	6
(India) A Prakash (India) K Das	16	5
(Malaysia) A Nurizwan (Malaysia) S Saniru	21	21

Second Round
1	(Indonesia) M Kido (Indonesia) P Zebadiah	wo
(India) A Vishnu (India) A Balan
(China) Wang YL (China) Huang YQ	21	21
(Malaysia) A Nurizwan (Malaysia) S Saniru	4	10

Quarterfinals
(India) A Vishnu (India) A Balan	14	12
(China) Wang YL (China) Huang YQ	21	21

==== Section 2 ====
First Round
3	(Malaysia) Ong JG (Malaysia) Lim YL
BYE
(China) Liu YC (China) Yu XH	21	21
(India) A Naimpally (India) T Murgunde	14	16
(India) V Sharma (India) J Nashier	15	15
(India) G Venkat (India) J Dewangan	21	21
(India) S Shukla (India) S Ghorpade	21	19	11
(Thailand) S Anugritayawon (Thailand) C Chaladchalam	19	21	21

Second Round
3	(Malaysia) Ong JG (Malaysia) Lim YL	16	21
(China) Liu YC (China) Yu XH	21	23
(India) G Venkat (India) J Dewangan	7	7
(Thailand) S Anugritayawon (Thailand) C Chaladchalam	21	21

Quarterfinals
(China) Liu YC (China) Yu XH	21	21
(Thailand) S Anugritayawon (Thailand) C Chaladchalam	4	11

=== Bottom half ===
==== Section 3 ====
First Round
(India) A Ahlawat (India) S Chhabra
(Indonesia) M Gideon (Indonesia) R Pradipta	wo
(India) J Sanyal (India) J Gutta	21	20	14
(Malaysia) L Abdul Khalid (Malaysia) Soong FC	17	22	21
(China) Zheng SW (China) Jia YF	21	21
(India) Sh Sharma (India) Sa Sharma	12	9
(India) V Singh (India) G Asaji	10	3^{r}
4	(India) T Kona (India) A Ponnappa	21	5

Second Round
(India) A Ahlawat (India) S Chhabra	8	4
(Malaysia) L Abdul Khalid (Malaysia) Soong FC	21	21
(China) Zheng SW (China) Jia YF	16	21	22
4	(India) T Kona (India) A Ponnappa	21	13	20

Quarterfinals
(Malaysia) L Abdul Khalid (Malaysia) Soong FC	15	21	21
(China) Zheng SW (China) Jia YF	21	12	10

==== Section 4 ====
First Round
(India) H Malik (India) E Kalia	6	13
(Thailand) P Vilailak (Thailand) P Muenwong	21	21
(India) K Kumar (India) S Hasini	11	4
(China) Huang KX (China) Chen QC	21	21
(India) S Malik (India) Chitraleka	10	14
(India) N Kidambi (India) S Reddy	21	21
BYE
2	(Malaysia) Tan AQ (Malaysia) Lai PJ

Second Round
(Thailand) P Vilailak (Thailand) P Muenwong	21	19
(China) Huang KX (China) Chen QC	23	21
(India) N Kidambi (India) S Reddy	17	14
2	(Malaysia) Tan AQ (Malaysia) Lai PJ	21	21

Quarterfinals
(China) Huang KX (China) Chen QC	21	21
2	(Malaysia) Tan AQ (Malaysia) Lai PJ	14	15

Preceded by 2013 Vietnam Open Grand Prix	BWF Grand Prix Gold and Grand Prix; 2014 season	Succeeded by 2014 German Open Grand Prix Gold
