= 2008 Asian Junior Badminton Championships – Teams event =

Badminton championship in Kuala Lumpur, Malaysia

Teams event at the 2008 Asian Junior Badminton Championships
- Venue: Stadium Juara
- Location: Kuala Lumpur, Malaysia
- Dates: 13–16 July 2008

The team tournament at the 2008 Asian Junior Badminton Championships took place from 13 to 16 July 2008 at Stadium Juara in Kuala Lumpur, Malaysia. A total of 16 countries competed in this event.

== Group stage ==
=== Group A ===
Pos	Team	Pld	W	L	MF	MA	MD	GF	GA	GD	PF	PA	PD	Pts	Qualification	Malaysia	Japan	India	Iraq
1	Malaysia (H)	3	3	0	12	3	+9	25	7	+18	643	415	+228	3	Advance to knockout stage	—	3–2	4–1	5–0
2	Japan	3	2	1	10	5	+5	21	11	+10	610	415	+195	2	Advance to knockout stage		—	3–2	5–0
3	India	3	1	2	8	7	+1	17	15	+2	566	471	+95	1				—	5–0
4	Iraq	3	0	3	0	15	−15	0	30	−30	112	630	−518	0					—

Source: TS
(H) Host

==== Malaysia vs India ====
Malaysia
4
Stadium Juara
13 July 2008, 09:00 UTC+8

India
1

			1	2	3
1	(Malaysia) (India)	Mak Hee Chun / Vivian Hoo; Pranav Chopra / Prajakta Sawant	21; 12	21; 9
2	(Malaysia) (India)	Tan Aik Quan; Gurusai Dutt	18; 21	16; 21
3	(Malaysia) (India)	Tee Jing Yi; P. C. Thulasi	21; 17	21; 18
4	(Malaysia) (India)	Mak Hee Chun / Teo Kok Siang; Pranav Chopra / B. Sai Praneeth	22; 20	15; 21	21; 9
5	(Malaysia) (India)	Vivian Hoo / Tee Jing Yi; N. Sikki Reddy / P. C. Thulasi	21; 17	21; 18

==== Japan vs Iraq ====
Japan
5
Stadium Juara
13 July 2008, 09:00 UTC+8

Iraq
0

			1	2	3
1	(Japan) (Iraq)	Michiharu Kido; Muataz Wasfi	21; 3	21; 6
2	(Japan) (Iraq)	Eriko Tamaki; Ola Hasan	21; 1	21; 4
3	(Japan) (Iraq)	Rei Sato / Naomasa Senkyo; Mostafa Hussam / Mohammed Othman Saad	21; 2	21; 2
4	(Japan) (Iraq)	Ayaka Takahashi / Koharu Yonemoto; Ola Hasan / Adhraa Khalid	21; 0	21; 2
5	(Japan) (Iraq)	Naomasa Senkyo / Misaki Matsutomo; Muataz Wasfi / Adhraa Khalid	21; 3	21; 4

==== Malaysia vs Iraq ====
Malaysia
5
Stadium Juara
13 July 2008, 16:00 UTC+8

Iraq
0

			1	2	3
1	(Malaysia) (Iraq)	Sannatasah Saniru; Ola Hasan	21; 1	21; 4
2	(Malaysia) (Iraq)	Chooi Kah Ming / Ng Hui Ern; Haidar Besha / Adhraa Khalid	21; 9	21; 4
3	(Malaysia) (Iraq)	Iskandar Zulkarnain Zainuddin; Mostafa Hussam	21; 3	21; 4
4	(Malaysia) (Iraq)	Chooi Kah Ming / Yeoh Choong Yee; Mohammed Othman Saad / Muataz Wasfi	21; 4	21; 5
5	(Malaysia) (Iraq)	Chong Vee Vian / Ong Boon Hui; Ola Hasan / Adhraa Khalid	21; 3	21; 4

==== Japan vs India ====
Japan
3
Stadium Juara
13 July 2008, 16:00 UTC+8

India
2

			1	2	3
1	(Japan) (India)	Naomasa Senkyo / Misaki Matsutomo; Aditya Prakash / P. C. Thulasi	18; 21	14; 21
2	(Japan) (India)	Michiharu Kido; Gurusai Dutt	21; 11	18; 21	11; 21
3	(Japan) (India)	Ayaka Takahashi / Koharu Yonemoto; N. Sikki Reddy / P. C. Thulasi	22; 20	21; 12
4	(Japan) (India)	Rei Sato / Naomasa Senkyo; Pranav Chopra / B. Sai Praneeth	21; 18	21; 10
5	(Japan) (India)	Misaki Matsutomo; N. Sikki Reddy	21; 13	21; 5

==== Malaysia vs Japan ====
Malaysia
3
Stadium Juara
14 July 2008, 09:00 UTC+8

Japan
2

			1	2	3
1	(Malaysia) (Japan)	Mak Hee Chun / Vivian Hoo; Ryo Takiuchi / Koharu Yonemoto	21; 15	21; 19
2	(Malaysia) (Japan)	Iskandar Zulkarnain Zainuddin; Rei Sato	21; 19	21; 11
3	(Malaysia) (Japan)	Sannatasah Saniru; Misaki Matsutomo	15; 21	19; 21
4	(Malaysia) (Japan)	Tee Jing Yi / Vivian Hoo; Ayaka Takahashi / Koharu Yonemoto	19; 21	21; 19	15; 21
5	(Malaysia) (Japan)	Mak Hee Chun / Teo Kok Siang; Rei Sato / Naomasa Senkyo	21; 11	21; 13

==== India vs Iraq ====
India
5
Stadium Juara
14 July 2008, 09:00 UTC+8

Iraq
0

			1	2	3
1	(India) (Iraq)	B. Sai Praneeth / Pradnya Gadre; Haidar Besha / Adhraa Khalid	21; 4	21; 6
2	(India) (Iraq)	Aditya Prakash; Mostafa Hussam	21; 4	21; 6
3	(India) (Iraq)	Prajakta Sawant; Ola Hasan	21; 2	21; 2
4	(India) (Iraq)	Pratik Patel / Aditya Prakash; Mostafa Hussam / Muataz Wasfi	21; 6	21; 7
5	(India) (Iraq)	Pradnya Gadre / Shweta Kelkar; Ola Hasan / Adhraa Khalid	21; 2	21; 5

=== Group B ===
Pos	Team	Pld	W	L	MF	MA	MD	GF	GA	GD	PF	PA	PD	Pts	Qualification	South Korea	Hong Kong	Singapore	Macau
1	South Korea	3	3	0	15	0	+15	30	0	+30	634	294	+340	3	Advance to knockout stage	—	5–0	5–0	5–0
2	Hong Kong	3	2	1	9	6	+3	18	13	+5	566	458	+108	2	Advance to knockout stage		—	4–1	5–0
3	Singapore	3	1	2	6	9	−3	12	18	−6	426	524	−98	1				—	5–0
4	Macau	3	0	3	0	15	−15	1	30	−29	296	646	−350	0					—

Source: TS

==== Hong Kong vs Macau ====
Hong Kong
5
Stadium Juara
13 July 2008, 09:00 UTC+8

Macau
0

			1	2	3
1	(Hong Kong) (Macau)	Wong Wing Ki; Ip Tang Fai	21; 10	21; 10
2	(Hong Kong) (Macau)	Chan Tsz Ka; Iao Mei Ha	21; 7	21; 6
3	(Hong Kong) (Macau)	Wong Wing Ki / Tse Ying Suet; Cheang Wai Lok / Mou Chon Ieng	21; 8	21; 8
4	(Hong Kong) (Macau)	Lee Chun Hei / Ng Ka Long; Ip Tang Fai / Mou Chi Keong	21; 8	15; 21	21; 14
5	(Hong Kong) (Macau)	Chan Tsz Ka / Tse Ying Suet; Albertina Eugenia de Assis / Ieong Pek San	21; 7	21; 9

==== Singapore vs South Korea ====
Singapore
0
Stadium Juara
13 July 2008, 09:00 UTC+8

South Korea
5

			1	2	3
1	(Singapore) (South Korea)	Chen Guorui / Mok Jing Qiong; Kim Gi-jung / Eom Hye-won	9; 21	7; 21
2	(Singapore) (South Korea)	Ng Zong Ren; Park Sung-min	9; 21	7; 21
3	(Singapore) (South Korea)	Thng Ting Ting; Bae Yeon-ju	6; 21	4; 21
4	(Singapore) (South Korea)	Chen Guorui / Jeffrey Wong; Choi Young-woo / Kim Gi-jung	14; 21	9; 21
5	(Singapore) (South Korea)	Mok Jing Qiong / Samantha Neo; Eom Hye-won / Jung Kyung-eun	5; 21	9; 21

==== Hong Kong vs South Korea ====
Hong Kong
0
Stadium Juara
13 July 2008, 16:00 UTC+8

South Korea
5

			1	2	3
1	(Hong Kong) (South Korea)	Wong Wing Ki; Park Sung-min	20; 22	21; 23
2	(Hong Kong) (South Korea)	Chan Tsz Ka; Bae Yeon-ju	11; 21	8; 21
3	(Hong Kong) (South Korea)	Lee Chun Hei / Ng Ka Long; Choi Young-woo / Kim Gi-jung	5; 21	14; 21
4	(Hong Kong) (South Korea)	Chan Tsz Ka / Tse Ying Suet; Eom Hye-won / Jung Kyung-eun	13; 21	16; 21
5	(Hong Kong) (South Korea)	Wong Wing Ki / Tse Ying Suet; Choi Young-woo / Jung Kyung-eun	20; 22	17; 21

==== Singapore vs Macau ====
Singapore
5
Stadium Juara
13 July 2008, 16:00 UTC+8

Macau
0

			1	2	3
1	(Singapore) (Macau)	Thng Ting Ting; Albertina Eugenia De Assis	21; 14	14; 9
2	(Singapore) (Macau)	Ng Zong Ren; Cheang Wai Lok	21; 13	21; 10
3	(Singapore) (Macau)	Chen Guorui / Jeffrey Wong; Ip Tang Fai / Mou Chi Keong	21; 8	21; 12
4	(Singapore) (Macau)	Mok Jing Qiong / Samantha Neo; Mou Ieng Chon / Iao Mei Ha	21; 10	22; 20
5	(Singapore) (Macau)	Jeffrey Wong / Thng Ting Ting; Mou Chi Keong / Pek San Ieong	21; 14	21; 8

==== Hong Kong vs Singapore ====
Hong Kong
4
Stadium Juara
14 July 2008, 09:00 UTC+8

Singapore
1

			1	2	3
1	(Hong Kong) (Singapore)	Wong Wing Ki; Ng Zong Ren	21; 5	21; 5
2	(Hong Kong) (Singapore)	Chan Tsz Ka; Thng Ting Ting	21; 15	21; 11
3	(Hong Kong) (Singapore)	Lee Chun Hei / Ng Ka Long; Chen Guorui / Jeffrey Wong	15; 21	13; 21
4	(Hong Kong) (Singapore)	Chan Tsz Ka / Tse Ying Suet; Mok Jing Qiong / Samantha Neo	21; 12	21; 17
5	(Hong Kong) (Singapore)	Wong Wing Ki / Tse Ying Suet; Jeffrey Wong / Thng Ting Ting	21; 13	21; 16

==== South Korea vs Macau ====
South Korea
5
Stadium Juara
14 July 2008, 09:00 UTC+8

Macau
0

			1	2	3
1	(South Korea) (Macau)	Sung Ji-hyun; Iao Mei Ha	21; 4	21; 7
2	(South Korea) (Macau)	Kim Dae-eun / Kim Ki-eung; Cheang Wai Lok / Ip Tang Fai	21; 9	21; 7
3	(South Korea) (Macau)	Lee Dong-keun; Mou Chi Keong	21; 12	21; 7
4	(South Korea) (Macau)	Lee Joo-hee / Lee Se-rang; Iao Mei Ha / Mou Ieng Chon	21; 3	21; 3
5	(South Korea) (Macau)	Choi Min-jung / Lee Han-bit; Ip Tang Fai / Albertina Eugenia de Assis	21; 8	21; 10

=== Group C ===
Pos	Team	Pld	W	L	MF	MA	MD	GF	GA	GD	PF	PA	PD	Pts	Qualification	People's Republic of China	Chinese Taipei for Olympic games	Sri Lanka	Kazakhstan
1	China	3	3	0	13	2	+11	27	4	+23	624	353	+271	3	Advance to knockout stage	—	3–2	5–0	5–0
2	Chinese Taipei	3	2	1	12	3	+9	24	7	+17	607	384	+223	2	Advance to knockout stage		—	5–0	5–0
3	Sri Lanka	3	1	2	4	11	−7	9	22	−13	414	575	−161	1				—	4–1
4	Kazakhstan	3	0	3	1	14	−13	2	29	−27	309	642	−333	0					—

Source: TS

==== Chinese Taipei vs Kazakhstan ====
Chinese Taipei
5
Stadium Juara
13 July 2008, 09:00 UTC+8

Kazakhstan
0

			1	2	3
1	(Chinese Taipei) (Kazakhstan)	Chou Tien-chen / Peng Hsiao-chu; Artur Niyazov / Vladlena Kharchenko	21; 17	21; 4
2	(Chinese Taipei) (Kazakhstan)	Hsu Jen-hao; Samat Yerzhakanov	21; 9	21; 11
3	(Chinese Taipei) (Kazakhstan)	Hsu Ya-ching; Elizaveta Yakovleva	21; 5	21; 6
4	(Chinese Taipei) (Kazakhstan)	Huang Po-yi / Lu Hsin-hao; Artur Niyazov / Samat Yerzhakanov	21; 7	21; 6
5	(Chinese Taipei) (Kazakhstan)	Cheng Wan-hui / Peng Hsiao-chu; Vladlena Kharchenko / Elizaveta Yakovleva	21; 11	21; 6

==== China vs Sri Lanka ====
China
5
Stadium Juara
13 July 2008, 09:00 UTC+8

Sri Lanka
0

			1	2	3
1	(China) (Sri Lanka)	Zhang Nan / Lu Lu; Dilshan Kariyawasam / Chameka Madurawe	21; 8	21; 2
2	(China) (Sri Lanka)	Li Xuerui; Gayani Perera	21; 12	21; 12
3	(China) (Sri Lanka)	Gao Huan; Nayanakantha Wijesekera	21; 8	21; 7
4	(China) (Sri Lanka)	Chai Biao / Li Gen; Amila Fernando / Sankalpa Gunawardene	21; 19	21; 11
5	(China) (Sri Lanka)	Lu Lu / Xia Huan; Subodha Dahanayake / Gayani Perera	21; 10	21; 5

==== Chinese Taipei vs Sri Lanka ====
Chinese Taipei
5
Stadium Juara
13 July 2008, 16:00 UTC+8

Sri Lanka
0

			1	2	3
1	(Chinese Taipei) (Sri Lanka)	Chou Tien-chen / Cheng Wan-hui; Dilshan Kariyawasam / Chameka Madurawe	21; 12	21; 8
2	(Chinese Taipei) (Sri Lanka)	Hung Shih-han; Gayani Perera	21; 8	21; 8
3	(Chinese Taipei) (Sri Lanka)	Hsu Jen-hao; Nayanakantha Wijesekera	21; 14	21; 14
4	(Chinese Taipei) (Sri Lanka)	Huang Po-yi / Lu Hsin-hao; Amila Fernando / Sankalpa Gunawardene	21; 9	21; 8
5	(Chinese Taipei) (Sri Lanka)	Cheng Wan-hui / Peng Hsiao-chu; Gayani Perera / Subodha Dahanayake	21; 8	21; 9

==== China vs Kazakhstan ====
China
5
Stadium Juara
13 July 2008, 16:00 UTC+8

Kazakhstan
0

			1	2	3
1	(China) (Kazakhstan)	Wang Zhengming; Artur Niyazov	21; 11	21; 6
2	(China) (Kazakhstan)	Lin Shen; Elizaveta Yakovleva	21; 5	21; 10
3	(China) (Kazakhstan)	Chai Biao / Zhang Nan; Artur Niyazov / Samat Yerzhakanov	21; 5	21; 8
4	(China) (Kazakhstan)	Xie Jing / Zhong Qianxin; Vladlena Kharchenko / Elizaveta Yakovleva	21; 5	21; 1
5	(China) (Kazakhstan)	Li Gen / Xia Huan; Samat Yerzhakanov / Vladlena Kharchenko	21; 14	21; 7

==== Chinese Taipei vs China ====
Chinese Taipei
2
Stadium Juara
14 July 2008, 09:00 UTC+8

China
3

			1	2	3
1	(Chinese Taipei) (China)	Chou Tien-chen / Cheng Wan-hui; Li Gen / Xia Huan	21; 10	21; 8
2	(Chinese Taipei) (China)	Hsu Jen-hao; Gao Huan	15; 21	19; 21
3	(Chinese Taipei) (China)	Hsu Ya-ching; Li Xuerui	15; 21	14; 21
4	(Chinese Taipei) (China)	Huang Po-yi / Lu Hsin-hao; Chai Biao / Zhang Nan	17; 21	21; 19	22; 20
5	(Chinese Taipei) (China)	Cheng Wan-hui / Peng Hsiao-chu; Xie Jing / Zhong Qianxin	10; 21	12; 21

==== Sri Lanka vs Kazakhstan ====
Sri Lanka
4
Stadium Juara
14 July 2008, 09:00 UTC+8

Kazakhstan
1

			1	2	3
1	(Sri Lanka) (Kazakhstan)	Dilshan Kariyawasam / Chameka Madurawe; Artur Niyazov / Vladlena Kharchenko	21; 12	21; 10
2	(Sri Lanka) (Kazakhstan)	Nayanakantha Wijesekera; Samat Yerzhakanov	21; 10	21; 16
3	(Sri Lanka) (Kazakhstan)	Gayani Perera; Elizaveta Yakovleva	15; 21	21; 16	18; 21
4	(Sri Lanka) (Kazakhstan)	Amila Fernando / Sankalpa Gunawardene; Samat Yerzhakanov / Artur Niyazov	21; 10	21; 17
5	(Sri Lanka) (Kazakhstan)	Gayani Perera / Subodha Dahanayake; Elizaveta Yakovleva / Vladlena Kharchenko	21; 12	21; 10

=== Group D ===
Pos	Team	Pld	W	L	MF	MA	MD	GF	GA	GD	PF	PA	PD	Pts	Qualification	Indonesia	Thailand	Vietnam	North Korea
1	Indonesia	3	3	0	12	3	+9	26	7	+19	654	490	+164	3	Advance to knockout stage	—	3–2	4–1	5–0
2	Thailand	3	2	1	12	3	+9	25	7	+18	629	467	+162	2	Advance to knockout stage		—	4–1	5–0
3	Vietnam	3	1	2	6	9	−3	12	19	−7	509	555	−46	1				—	5–0
4	North Korea	3	0	3	0	15	−15	0	30	−30	350	630	−280	0					—

Source: TS

==== Thailand vs North Korea ====
Thailand
5
Stadium Juara
13 July 2008, 09:00 UTC+8

North Korea
0

			1	2	3
1	(Thailand) (North Korea)	Tanongsak Saensomboonsuk; Yu Ho-chol	21; 14	21; 14
2	(Thailand) (North Korea)	Maneepong Jongjit / Sapsiree Taerattanachai; Ri Un-nam / Kim Ryon-mi	21; 10	21; 12
3	(Thailand) (North Korea)	Porntip Buranaprasertsuk; Hyon Un-sil	21; 9	21; 12
4	(Thailand) (North Korea)	Sarayuth Saetung / Sermsin Wongyaporm; Ri Un-nam / Yu Ho-chol	21; 12	21; 6
5	(Thailand) (North Korea)	Tanyanan Pamornsuwan / Nuttaya Sanlekanan; Hyon Un-sil / Kim Ryon-mi	21; 8	21; 14

==== Indonesia vs Vietnam ====
Indonesia
4
Stadium Juara
13 July 2008, 09:00 UTC+8

Vietnam
1

			1	2	3
1	(Indonesia) (Vietnam)	Muhammad Ulinnuha / Annisa Wahyuni; Trương Thanh Long / Bùi Mai Hoàng Yến	21; 10	21; 11
2	(Indonesia) (Vietnam)	Engga Setiawan; Bùi Quang Tuấn	21; 12	21; 7
3	(Indonesia) (Vietnam)	Hera Desi; Phùng Nguyễn Phương Nhi	21; 16	19; 21	18; 21
4	(Indonesia) (Vietnam)	Kevin Alexander / Angga Pratama; Nguyễn Công Hải / Phạm Cao Thắng	21; 16	21; 19
5	(Indonesia) (Vietnam)	Anneke Feinya Agustin / Annisa Wahyuni; Nguyễn Thị Sen / Vũ Thị Trang	21; 16	21; 12

==== Thailand vs Vietnam ====
Thailand
5
Stadium Juara
13 July 2008, 16:00 UTC+8

Vietnam
0

			1	2	3
1	(Thailand) (Vietnam)	Tanongsak Saensomboonsuk; Trương Thanh Long	21; 15	21; 15
2	(Thailand) (Vietnam)	Porntip Buranaprasertsuk; Nguyễn Thị Sen	21; 10	21; 8
3	(Thailand) (Vietnam)	Sarayuth Saetung / Sermsin Wongyaporm; Bùi Quang Tuấn / Nguyễn Công Hải	21; 10	21; 13
4	(Thailand) (Vietnam)	Tanyanan Pamornsuwan / Nuttaya Sanlekanan; Bùi Mai Hoàng Yến / Phùng Nguyễn Phương Nhi	21; 15	21; 18
5	(Thailand) (Vietnam)	Pisit Poodchalat / Ratchanok Inthanon; Phạm Cao Thắng / Vũ Thị Trang	21; 18	21; 16

==== Indonesia vs North Korea ====
Indonesia
5
Stadium Juara
13 July 2008, 16:00 UTC+8

North Korea
0

			1	2	3
1	(Indonesia) (North Korea)	Adi Pratama; Ri Un-nam	21; 9	21; 7
2	(Indonesia) (North Korea)	Muhammad Ulinnuha / Anneke Feinya Agustin; Yu Ho-chol / Kim Ryon-mi	21; 15	21; 15
3	(Indonesia) (North Korea)	Maziyyah Nadhir; Hyon Un-sil	21; 9	21; 12
4	(Indonesia) (North Korea)	Kevin Alexander / Angga Pratama; Ri Un-nam / Yu Ho-chol	21; 7	21; 17
5	(Indonesia) (North Korea)	Annisa Wahyuni / Nimas Rani Wijayanti; Hyon Un-sil / Kim Ryon-mi	21; 10	21; 19

==== Thailand vs Indonesia ====
Thailand
2
Stadium Juara
14 July 2008, 09:00 UTC+8

Indonesia
3

			1	2	3
1	(Thailand) (Indonesia)	Maneepong Jongjit / Sapsiree Taerattanachai; Muhammad Ulinnuha / Annisa Wahyuni	18; 21	21; 14	21; 15
2	(Thailand) (Indonesia)	Porntip Buranaprasertsuk; Hera Desi	21; 12	21; 19
3	(Thailand) (Indonesia)	Tanongsak Saensomboonsuk; Adi Pratama	17; 21	21; 9	21; 23
4	(Thailand) (Indonesia)	Maneepong Jongjit / Sermsin Wongyaporm; Kevin Alexander / Angga Pratama	10; 21	12; 21
5	(Thailand) (Indonesia)	Porntip Buranaprasertsuk / Sapsiree Taerattanachai; Anneke Feinya Agustin / Annisa Wahyuni	19; 21	7; 21

==== Vietnam vs North Korea ====
Vietnam
5
Stadium Juara
14 July 2008, 09:00 UTC+8

North Korea
0

			1	2	3
1	(Vietnam) (North Korea)	Trương Thanh Long / Bùi Mai Hoàng Yến; Ri Un-nam / Kim Ryon-mi	21; 17	21; 13
2	(Vietnam) (North Korea)	Bùi Quang Tuấn; Yu Ho-chol	21; 8	21; 18
3	(Vietnam) (North Korea)	Phùng Nguyễn Phương Nhi; Hyon Un-sil	21; 13	21; 7
4	(Vietnam) (North Korea)	Nguyễn Công Hải / Phạm Cao Thắng; Ri Un-nam / Yu Ho-chol	21; 10	21; 13
5	(Vietnam) (North Korea)	Nguyễn Thị Sen / Vũ Thị Trang; Hyon Un-sil / Kim Ryon-mi	21; 8	21; 12

== Knockout stage ==
=== Bracket ===
Quarter-finals
14 July
Malaysia	3
Chinese Taipei	2
14 July
South Korea	3
Thailand	1
14 July
Japan	1
China	3
14 July
Hong Kong	3
Indonesia	2

Semi-finals
15 July
Malaysia	1
South Korea	3
15 July
China	3
Hong Kong	0

Final
16 July
South Korea	1
China	3

=== Quarter-finals ===
==== Malaysia vs Chinese Taipei ====
Malaysia
3
Stadium Juara
14 July 2008, 18:00 UTC+8

Chinese Taipei
2

			1	2	3
1	(Malaysia) (Chinese Taipei)	Teo Kok Siang / Sannatasah Saniru; Chou Tien-chen / Cheng Wan-hui	21; 16	13; 21	21; 15
2	(Malaysia) (Chinese Taipei)	Tee Jing Yi; Hung Shih-han	22; 24	17; 21
3	(Malaysia) (Chinese Taipei)	Iskandar Zulkarnain Zainuddin; Hsu Jen-hao	13; 21	21; 13	18; 21
4	(Malaysia) (Chinese Taipei)	Mak Hee Chun / Teo Kok Siang; Lu Hsin-hao / Huang Po-yi	21; 14	21; 19
5	(Malaysia) (Chinese Taipei)	Vivian Hoo / Tee Jing Yi; Peng Hsiao-chu / Cheng Wan-hui	21; 15	17; 21	21; 17

==== South Korea vs Thailand ====
South Korea
3
Stadium Juara
14 July 2008, 18:00 UTC+8

Thailand
1

			1	2	3
1	(South Korea) (Thailand)	Kim Gi-jung / Eom Hye-won; Maneepong Jongjit / Sapsiree Taerattanachai	21; 16	21; 15
2	(South Korea) (Thailand)	Park Sung-min; Tanongsak Saensomboonsuk	11; 21	16; 21
3	(South Korea) (Thailand)	Bae Yeon-ju; Porntip Buranaprasertsuk	13; 21	21; 7	21; 6
4	(South Korea) (Thailand)	Choi Young-woo / Kim Ki-eung; Pisit Poodchalat / Sarayuth Saetung	21; 19	21; 15
5	(South Korea) (Thailand)	Eom Hye-won / Jung Kyung-eun; Tanyanan Pamornsuwan / Nuttaya Sanlekanan				not played

==== Japan vs China ====
Japan
1
Stadium Juara
14 July 2008, 18:00 UTC+8

China
3

			1	2	3
1	(Japan) (China)	Ryo Takiuchi / Koharu Yonemoto; Chai Biao / Xie Jing	13; 21	16; 21
2	(Japan) (China)	Michiharu Kido; Wang Zhengming	11; 21	11; 21
3	(Japan) (China)	Eriko Tamaki; Lin Shen	21; 18	20; 22		retired
4	(Japan) (China)	Rei Sato / Naomasa Senkyo; Chai Biao / Zhang Nan	17; 21	12; 21
5	(Japan) (China)	Ayaka Takahashi / Koharu Yonemoto; Xie Jing / Zhong Qianxin

==== Hong Kong vs Indonesia ====
Hong Kong
3
Stadium Juara
14 July 2008, 18:00 UTC+8

Indonesia
2

			1	2	3
1	(Hong Kong) (Indonesia)	Chan Tsz Ka; Hera Desi	21; 11	21; 16
2	(Hong Kong) (Indonesia)	Wong Wing Ki; Engga Setiawan	21; 12	21; 10
3	(Hong Kong) (Indonesia)	Chan Tsz Ka / Tse Ying Suet; Anneke Feinya Agustin / Annisa Wahyuni	16; 21	11; 21
4	(Hong Kong) (Indonesia)	Lee Chun Hei / Ng Ka Long; Kevin Alexander / Angga Pratama	10; 21	16; 21
5	(Hong Kong) (Indonesia)	Wong Wing Ki / Tse Ying Suet; Muhammad Ulinnuha / Annisa Wahyuni	25; 23	13; 21	21; 17

=== Semi-finals ===
==== Malaysia vs South Korea ====
Malaysia
1
Stadium Juara
15 July 2008, 09:00 UTC+8

South Korea
3

			1	2	3
1	(Malaysia) (South Korea)	Mak Hee Chun / Vivian Hoo; Kim Gi-jung / Eom Hye-won	21; 18	19; 21	21; 16
2	(Malaysia) (South Korea)	Kuan Kam Chung; Park Sung-min	18; 21	21; 18	14; 21
3	(Malaysia) (South Korea)	Tiffany Chase-Currier; Bae Yeon-ju	13; 21	17; 21
4	(Malaysia) (South Korea)	Mak Hee Chun / Teo Kok Siang; Choi Young-woo / Kim Gi-jung	21; 19	14; 21	10; 21
5	(Malaysia) (South Korea)	Vivian Hoo / Tee Jing Yi; Eom Hye-won / Jung Kyung-eun				not played

==== China vs Hong Kong ====
China
3
Stadium Juara
15 July 2008, 09:00 UTC+8

Hong Kong
0

			1	2	3
1	(China) (Hong Kong)	Chai Biao / Xie Jing; Ng Ka Long / Poon Lok Yan	21; 14	21; 5
2	(China) (Hong Kong)	Wang Zhengming; Lee Chun Hei	21; 10	21; 16
3	(China) (Hong Kong)	Li Xuerui; Tse Ying Suet	21; 14	21; 16
4	(China) (Hong Kong)	Xie Jing / Zhong Qianxin; Chan Hung Yung / Yeung Hiu Tung				not played
5	(China) (Hong Kong)	Chai Biao / Zhang Nan; Wong Wing Ki / Ng Ka Long				not played

=== Final ===
==== South Korea vs China ====
South Korea
1
Stadium Juara
16 July 2008, 13:30 UTC+8

China
3

			1	2	3
1	(South Korea) (China)	Kim Gi-jung / Eom Hye-won; Chai Biao / Xie Jing	16; 21	21; 19	23; 21
2	(South Korea) (China)	Park Sung-min; Gao Huan	12; 21	17; 21
3	(South Korea) (China)	Bae Yeon-ju; Li Xuerui	18; 21	10; 21
4	(South Korea) (China)	Choi Young-woo / Kim Gi-jung; Chai Biao / Zhang Nan	13; 21	10; 21
5	(South Korea) (China)	Eom Hye-won / Jung Kyung-eun; Xie Jing / Zhong Qianxin				not played
