= 2016 Syed Modi International Grand Prix Gold =

Tournament details
- Dates: 26 – 31 January 2016
- Level: Grand Prix Gold
- Total prize money: US$120,000
- Venue: Babu Banarasi Das Indoor Stadium
- Location: Lucknow, India

Champions
- Men's singles: (India) Srikanth Kidambi
- Women's singles: (South Korea) Sung Ji-hyun
- Men's doubles: (Malaysia) Goh V Shem (Malaysia) Tan Wee Kiong
- Women's doubles: (South Korea) Jung Kyung-eun (South Korea) Shin Seung-chan
- Mixed doubles: (Indonesia) Praveen Jordan (Indonesia) Debby Susanto

The 2016 Syed Modi International Grand Prix Gold was the second grand prix's badminton tournament of the 2016 BWF Grand Prix and Grand Prix Gold. It was the 8th edition of the Syed Modi International Badminton Championships. The tournament was held at the Babu Banarasi Das Indoor Stadium in Lucknow, India on 26 – 31 January 2016 and had a total purse of $120,000.

== Men's singles ==
=== Seeds ===
1. (India) Srikanth Kidambi (champion)
2. (Indonesia) Tommy Sugiarto (withdrawn)
3. (South Korea) Son Wan-ho (second round)
4. (India) Parupalli Kashyap (quarterfinals)
5. (India) H. S. Prannoy (first round)
6. (India) Ajay Jayaram (second round)
7. (South Korea) Lee Dong-keun (third round)
8. (Japan) Sho Sasaki (second round)
9. (Chinese Taipei) Hsu Jen-hao (second round)
10. (South Korea) Jeon Hyeok-jin (third round)
11. (Thailand) Boonsak Ponsana (semifinals)
12. (Indonesia) Ihsan Maulana Mustofa (withdrawn)
13. (Japan) Takuma Ueda (first round)
14. (Thailand) Tanongsak Saensomboonsuk (second round)
15. (India) B. Sai Praneeth (second round)
16. (Indonesia) Anthony Sinisuka Ginting (first round)

=== Finals ===
Quarterfinals
1	(India) Srikanth Kidambi	21	18	24
(Malaysia) Goh Soon Huat	17	21	22
(Malaysia) Zulfadli Zulkiffli	17	19
11	(Thailand) Boonsak Ponsana	21	21
(China) Huang Yuxiang	21	18	21
4	(India) Parupalli Kashyap	16	21	15
(India) Harsheel Dani	14	11
(China) Shi Yuqi	21	21

Semifinals
1	(India) Srikanth Kidambi	21	21
11	(Thailand) Boonsak Ponsana	14	7
(China) Huang Yuxiang	17	22	21
(China) Shi Yuqi	21	20	12

Final
1	(India) Srikanth Kidambi	21	14	21
(China) Huang Yuxiang	13	21	14

=== Top half ===
==== Section 1 ====
First Round
1	(India) S Kidambi	21	21
(Iran) V-S Eskandari	4	10
(Chinese Taipei) Wang T-w	18	17
(Malaysia) Soong J V	21	21
16	(Indonesia) A S Ginting	21	20
(Israel) M Zilberman	23	22
(India) R. M. V. Gurusaidutt	10	17
(Malaysia) I Z Zainuddin	21	21

Second Round
1	(India) S Kidambi	21	21
(Malaysia) Soong J V	18	14
(Israel) M Zilberman	15	22
(Malaysia) I Z Zainuddin	21	24

Third Round
1	(India) S Kidambi	21	21
(Malaysia) I Z Zainuddin	9	12

==== Section 2 ====
First Round
8	(Japan) S Sasaki	21	21
Q8	(India) U Arora	11	6
PFQ	(India) A Prakash	11	12
(Malaysia) Goh S H	21	21
10	(South Korea) Jeon H-j	26	18	21
(India) K Dharmamer	24	21	10
(Egypt) A A El Khateeb	13	18
PFQ	(India) K A Kumar	21	21

Second Round
8	(Japan) S Sasaki	18	10
(Malaysia) Goh S H	21	21
10	(South Korea) Jeon H-j	15	21	21
PFQ	(India) K A Kumar	21	13	9

Third Round
(Malaysia) Goh S H	21	21
10	(South Korea) Jeon H-j	13	16

==== Section 3 ====
First Round
3	(South Korea) Son W-h	21	21
Q6	(India) S Jakhar	6	12
(Malaysia) Z Zulkiffli	21	21
(Indonesia) K H Wibowo	9	10
PFQ	(Malaysia) Goh G C	15	21	22
(France) T Rouxel	21	9	20
(India) A Joshi	21	22
Q5	(India) S Malik	10	20

Second Round
3	(South Korea) Son W-h	19	13
(Malaysia) Z Zulkiffli	21	21
PFQ	(Malaysia) Goh G C	17	21	21
(India) A Joshi	21	16	17

Third Round
(Malaysia) Z Zulkiffli	13	21	21
PFQ	(Malaysia) Goh G C	21	16	16

==== Section 4 ====
First Round
6	(India) A Jayaram	21	21
Q3	(India) R Singh	14	13
PFQ	(India) T Laa	18	15
(India) S Jaiswal	21	21
11	(Thailand) B Ponsana	21	21
PFQ	(India) S Verma	8	18
(Scotland) A Casey	12	21	14
(India) P Joshi	21	19	21

Second Round
6	(India) A Jayaram	18	21	15
(India) S Jaiswal	21	15	21
11	(Thailand) B Ponsana	11	21	21
(India) P Joshi	21	13	16

Third Round
(India) S Jaiswal	10	18
11	(Thailand) B Ponsana	21	21

=== Bottom half ===
==== Section 5 ====
First Round
PFQ	(India) S Lakhanee	6	16
(Indonesia) J Christie	21	21
(India) S Dey	13	18
9	(Chinese Taipei) Hsu J-h	21	21
(India) S Verma	21	21
(Thailand) P Thongnuam	14	11
(China) Huang YX	21	21
5	(India) H. S. Prannoy	12	17

Second Round
(Indonesia) J Christie	20	21	21
9	(Chinese Taipei) Hsu J-h	22	11	9
(India) S Verma	21	12	17
(China) Huang YX	19	21	21

Third Round
(Indonesia) J Christie	18	21	15
(China) Huang YX	21	16	21

==== Section 6 ====
First Round
(India) A Pawar	21	21
Q1	(India) M Kamat	10	14
(China) Zhu SY	21	21
13	(Japan) T Ueda	14	14
Q2	(India) A Yadav	18	10
(Singapore) Derek Wong Z L	21	21
PFQ	(India) O Bansal	18	11
4	(India) P Kashyap	21	21

Second Round
(India) A Pawar	22	12	16
(China) Zhu SY	20	21	21
(Singapore) Derek Wong Z L	14	28	17
4	(India) P Kashyap	21	26	21

Third Round
(China) Zhu SY	19	10
4	(India) P Kashyap	21	21

==== Section 7 ====
First Round
(India) H Dani	21	21
PFQ	(India) H Aggarwal	11	9
(Iran) F Khanjani	5	7
15	(India) B S Praneeth	21	21
(India) A Yelegar	13	21	19
(Czech Republic) P Koukal	21	19	21
Q4	(India) S Rawat	7	13
7	(South Korea) Lee D-k	21	21

Second Round
(India) H Dani	14	21	21
15	(India) B S Praneeth	21	17	16
(Czech Republic) P Koukal	12	19
7	(South Korea) Lee D-k	21	21

Third Round
(India) H Dani	21	21
7	(South Korea) Lee D-k	15	10

==== Section 8 ====
First Round
Q7	(India) K Jindal	19	17
(Malaysia) Chong W F	21	21
(Indonesia) W Y Prasetyo	12	15
14	(Thailand) T Saensomboonsuk	21	21
(India) S Thakur	15	4
(China) Shi YQ	21	21
(India) S Varma	21	21
PFQ	(India) R Y Chittaboina	12	15

Second Round
(Malaysia) Chong W F	18	26	21
14	(Thailand) T Saensomboonsuk	21	24	19
(China) Shi YQ	21	21	21
(India) S Varma	12	23	12

Third Round
(Malaysia) Chong W F	18	19
(China) Shi YQ	21	21

== Women's singles ==
=== Seeds ===
1. (India) Saina Nehwal (withdrawn)
2. (South Korea) Sung Ji-hyun (champion)
3. (India) P. V. Sindhu (second round)
4. (South Korea) Bae Yeon-ju (first round)
5. (Japan) Sayaka Sato (final)
6. (Japan) Yui Hashimoto (quarterfinals)
7. (Thailand) Busanan Ongbumrungpan (quarterfinals)
8. (Scotland) Kirsty Gilmour (quarterfinals)

=== Finals ===
Semifinals
(Thailand) Porntip Buranaprasertsuk	15	17
5	(Japan) Sayaka Sato	21	21
(Thailand) Nitchaon Jindapol	16	8
2	(South Korea) Sung Ji-hyun	21	21

Final
5	(Japan) Sayaka Sato	21	18	18
2	(South Korea) Sung Ji-hyun	12	21	21

=== Top half ===
==== Section 1 ====
First Round
PFQ	(Malaysia) Ho Y M	19	14
(Thailand) P Buranaprasertsuk	21	21
(Russia) N Perminova	21	16	21
Q2	(Iran) N Amiripour	10	21	11
8	(Scotland) K Gilmour	21	21
Q3	(Sri Lanka) L Shehani	10	10
(China) He BJ	21	21
(Singapore) Liang XY	17	15

Second Round
(Thailand) P Buranaprasertsuk	20	21	21
(Russia) N Perminova	22	13	11
8	(Scotland) K Gilmour	21	21
(China) He BJ	16	18

Quarterfinals
(Thailand) P Buranaprasertsuk	21	21
8	(Scotland) K Gilmour	18	19

==== Section 2 ====
First Round
4	(South Korea) Bae Y-j	15	21	15
(United States) I Wang	21	16	21
(Switzerland) S Jaquet	13	9
(Indonesia) M F Kusumastuti	21	21
5	(Japan) S Sato	21	22
(Chinese Taipei) Hsu Y-c	11	20
(Malaysia) Tee J Y	21	19	18
PFQ	(Chinese Taipei) Lee C-h	17	21	21

Second Round
(United States) I Wang	21	17	17
(Indonesia) M F Kusumastuti	9	21	21
5	(Japan) S Sato	21	22
PFQ	(Chinese Taipei) Lee C-h	13	20

Quarterfinals
(Indonesia) M F Kusumastuti	9	3
5	(Japan) S Sato	21	21

=== Bottom half ===
==== Section 3 ====
First Round
PFQ	(Egypt) H Hosny	9	8
(Chinese Taipei) Pai Y-p	21	21
(India) P. C. Thulasi	14	23	19
7	(Thailand) B Ongbumrungpan	21	21	21
(Thailand) N Jindapol	21	21
(Indonesia) L Fanetri	16	18
Q4	(India) R Mukherjee	6	7
3	(India) P. V. Sindhu	21	21

Second Round
(Chinese Taipei) Pai Y-p	15	22	10
7	(Thailand) B Ongbumrungpan	21	20	21
(Thailand) N Jindapol	18	26	21
3	(India) P. V. Sindhu	21	24	17

Quarterfinals
7	(Thailand) B Ongbumrungpan	14	14
(Thailand) N Jindapol	21	21

==== Section 4 ====
First Round
PFQ	(Indonesia) Fitriani	9	9
Q1	(Malaysia) Goh J W	21	21
(Russia) K Polikarpova	12	12
6	(Japan) Y Hashimoto	21	21
(Indonesia) H Ramadini	21	21
(Netherlands) S de Visch Eijbergen	14	12
PFQ	(India) T Lad	9	6
2	(South Korea) Sung J-h	21	21

Second Round
Q1	(Malaysia) Goh J W	17	10
6	(Japan) Y Hashimoto	21	21
(Indonesia) H Ramadini	14	10
2	(South Korea) Sung J-h	21	21

Quarterfinals
6	(Japan) Y Hashimoto	19	13
2	(South Korea) Sung J-h	21	21

== Men's doubles ==
=== Seeds ===
1. (Denmark) Mathias Boe / Carsten Mogensen (semifinals)
2. (South Korea) Kim Sa-rang / Kim Gi-jung (semifinals)
3. (Denmark) Mads Conrad-Petersen / Mads Pieler Kolding (quarterfinals)
4. (South Korea) Ko Sung-hyun / Shin Baek-cheol (second round)
5. (Indonesia) Angga Pratama / Ricky Karanda Suwardi (second round)
6. (Russia) Vladimir Ivanov / Ivan Sozonov (quarterfinals)
7. (China) Li Junhui / Liu Yuchen (first round)
8. (Chinese Taipei) Lee Sheng-mu / Tsai Chia-hsin (quarterfinals)

=== Finals ===
Semifinals
1	(Denmark) Mathias Boe (Denmark) Carsten Mogensen	16	18
(Malaysia) Tan Wee Kiong (Malaysia) Goh V Shem	21	21
(India) Pranaav Jerry Chopra (India) Akshay Dewalkar	25	13	21
2	(South Korea) Kim Sa-rang (South Korea) Kim Gi-jung	23	21	17

Final
(Malaysia) Tan Wee Kiong (Malaysia) Goh V Shem	14	24	21
(India) Pranaav Jerry Chopra (India) Akshay Dewalkar	21	22	8

=== Top half ===
==== Section 1 ====
First Round
1	(Denmark) M Boe (Denmark) C Mogensen	21	21
(Thailand) D Puavaranukroh (Thailand) K Kedren	13	10
(India) G G Raju (India) A K R Malgari	29	21	16
PFQ	(India) V Manuel (India) S Sanjeeth	30	14	21
8	(Chinese Taipei) Lee S-m (Chinese Taipei) Tsai C-h	21	21
Q4	(India) A Francis (India) T Kona	10	16
(Indonesia) K S Sukamuljo (Indonesia) M F Gideon	21	21
PFQ	(India) K Chaudhary (India) V K Singh	17	13

Second Round
1	(Denmark) M Boe (Denmark) C Mogensen	21	21
PFQ	(India) V Manuel (India) S Sanjeeth	7	12
8	(Chinese Taipei) Lee S-m (Chinese Taipei) Tsai C-h	21	21
(Indonesia) K S Sukamuljo (Indonesia) M F Gideon	15	15

Quarterfinals
1	(Denmark) M Boe (Denmark) C Mogensen	21	21
8	(Chinese Taipei) Lee S-m (Chinese Taipei) Tsai C-h	12	18

==== Section 2 ====
First Round
4	(South Korea) Ko S-h (South Korea) Shin B-c	21	21
(India) M Attri (India) B S Reddy	18	16
(Malaysia) Tan W K (Malaysia) Goh V S	21	21
(Japan) N Hirata (Japan) H Hashimoto	14	12
6	(Russia) V Ivanov (Russia) I Sozonov	21	21
(Germany) J Schöttler (Germany) M Fuchs	14	16
PFQ	(Iran) V-S Eskandari (Iran) F Khanjani	8	17
(India) M A Raju (India) V G Prasad	21	21

Second Round
4	(South Korea) Ko S-h (South Korea) Shin B-c	14	21	22
(Malaysia) Tan W K (Malaysia) Goh V S	21	14	24
6	(Russia) V Ivanov (Russia) I Sozonov	21	21
(India) M A Raju (India) V G Prasad	14	7

Quarterfinals
(Malaysia) Tan W K (Malaysia) Goh V S	21	21
6	(Russia) V Ivanov (Russia) I Sozonov	16	15

=== Bottom half ===
==== Section 3 ====
First Round
(India) P J Chopra (India) A Dewalkar	21	21
Q1	(India) K P Garaga (India) S Rankireddy	16	9
(Egypt) A A El Khateeb (Egypt) A Kashkal	7	9
5	(Indonesia) A Pratama (Indonesia) R K Suwardi	21	21
(India) S Ramchandran (India) K Nandagopal	21	16	21
(United States) P Chew (United States) S Pongnairat	9	21	9
(Malaysia) Koo K K (Malaysia) Tan B H	9	21	16
3	(Denmark) M Conrad-Petersen (Denmark) M P Kolding	21	17	21

Second Round
(India) P J Chopra (India) A Dewalkar	21	21
5	(Indonesia) A Pratama (Indonesia) R K Suwardi	13	14
(India) S Ramchandran (India) K Nandagopal	19	6
3	(Denmark) M Conrad-Petersen (Denmark) M P Kolding	21	21

Quarterfinals
(India) P J Chopra (India) A Dewalkar	22	11	23
3	(Denmark) M Conrad-Petersen (Denmark) M P Kolding	20	21	21

==== Section 4 ====
First Round
Q2	(China) He JT (China) Tan Q	16	22	25
(Chinese Taipei) Chen H-l (Chinese Taipei) Wang C-l	21	20	23
(Japan) K Sonoda (Japan) T Kamura	16	21	23
7	(China) Li JH (China) Liu YC	21	19	21
(Thailand) B Issara (Thailand) N Puangpuapech	21	21
Q3	(Indonesia) D Juang (Indonesia) C Rusdianto	11	13
(Indonesia) B Angriawan (Indonesia) R A Saputro	21	13	14
2	(South Korea) Kim S-r (South Korea) Kim G-j	17	21	21

Second Round
Q2	(China) He JT (China) Tan Q	13	10
(Japan) K Sonoda (Japan) T Kamura	21	21
(Thailand) B Issara (Thailand) N Puangpuapech	21	18
2	(South Korea) Kim S-r (South Korea) Kim G-j	23	21

Quarterfinals
(Japan) K Sonoda (Japan) T Kamura	19	21	18
2	(South Korea) Kim S-r (South Korea) Kim G-j	21	19	21

== Women's doubles ==
=== Seeds ===
1. (South Korea) Chang Ye-na / Lee So-hee (semifinals)
2. (South Korea) Jung Kyung-eun / Shin Seung-chan (champion)
3. (Netherlands) Eefje Muskens / Selena Piek (final)
4. (Malaysia) Vivian Hoo Kah Mun / Woon Khe Wei (first round)
5. (Japan) Shizuka Matsuo / Mami Naito (quarterfinals)
6. (India) Jwala Gutta / Ashwini Ponnappa (semifinals)
7. (South Korea) Go Ah-ra / Yoo Hae-won (quarterfinals)
8. (Bulgaria) Stefani Stoeva / Gabriela Stoeva (first round)

=== Finals ===
Semifinals
1	(South Korea) Chang Ye-na (South Korea) Lee So-hee	17	8
3	(Netherlands) Eefje Muskens (Netherlands) Selena Piek	21	21
6	(India) Jwala Gutta (India) Ashwini Ponnappa	14	16
2	(South Korea) Jung Kyung-eun (South Korea) Shin Seung-chan	21	21

Final
3	(Netherlands) Eefje Muskens (Netherlands) Selena Piek	15	13
2	(South Korea) Jung Kyung-eun (South Korea) Shin Seung-chan	21	21

=== Top half ===
==== Section 1 ====
First Round
1	(South Korea) Chang Y-n (South Korea) Lee S-h	w	/	o
(India) K Garg (India) Pooja D.
(Egypt) M Eltanany (Egypt) N Ashraf	7	5
(Germany) C Nelte (Germany) J Goliszewski	21	21
7	(South Korea) Go A-r (South Korea) Yoo H-w	21	21
Q1	(India) G Asaji (India) S Sharma	6	6
PFQ	(China) Du Y (China) Li YH	21	23	21
(Malaysia) A A Anscelly (Malaysia) Soong F C	13	25	18

Second Round
1	(South Korea) Chang Y-n (South Korea) Lee S-h	21	21
(Germany) C Nelte (Germany) J Goliszewski	12	12
7	(South Korea) Go A-r (South Korea) Yoo H-w	16	21	21
PFQ	(China) Du Y (China) Li YH	21	19	14

Quarterfinals
1	(South Korea) Chang Y-n (South Korea) Lee S-h	21	21
7	(South Korea) Go A-r (South Korea) Yoo H-w	14	14

==== Section 2 ====
First Round
3	(Netherlands) E Muskens (Netherlands) S Piek	21	21
(India) D S Kalyani (India) J Dewangan	5	11
(India) P Sawant (India) A Balan	21	13	21
(Chinese Taipei) Hsu Y-c (Chinese Taipei) Pai Y-p	13	21	17
8	(Bulgaria) S Stoeva (Bulgaria) G Stoeva	13	8
(Thailand) J Kittiharakul (Thailand) R Prajongjai	21	21
(Indonesia) D D Haris (Indonesia) R E Putri Sari	12	21	20
(Russia) E Bolotova (Russia) E Kosetskaya	21	17	22

Second Round
3	(Netherlands) E Muskens (Netherlands) S Piek	21	21
(India) P Sawant (India) A Balan	17	17
(Thailand) J Kittiharakul (Thailand) R Prajongjai	21	17	19
(Russia) E Bolotova (Russia) E Kosetskaya	13	21	21

Quarterfinals
3	(Netherlands) E Muskens (Netherlands) S Piek	21	21
(Russia) E Bolotova (Russia) E Kosetskaya	15	17

=== Bottom half ===
==== Section 3 ====
First Round
Q3	(India) N B Hazarika (India) H Veludurthi	21	21
(India) S Nagarkoti (India) P Naqvi	15	10
(England) L Smith (England) H Olver	6	14
6	(India) J Gutta (India) A Ponnappa	21	21
PFQ	(India) S Naqvi (India) R Pillai	7	11
(India) N S Reddy (India) K Maneesha	21	21
(Thailand) S Taerattanachai (Thailand) P Supajirakul	21	16	21
4	(Malaysia) Vivian Hoo K M (Malaysia) Woon K W	18	21	13

Second Round
Q3	(India) N B Hazarika (India) H Veludurthi	9	10
6	(India) J Gutta (India) A Ponnappa	21	21
(India) N S Reddy (India) K Maneesha	11	17
(Thailand) S Taerattanachai (Thailand) P Supajirakul	21	21

Quarterfinals
6	(India) J Gutta (India) A Ponnappa	23	21
(Thailand) S Taerattanachai (Thailand) P Supajirakul	21	17

==== Section 4 ====
First Round
Q2	(India) S P Ram (India) A S Sunil	21	21
Q4	(India) F Mather (India) K Wadkar	9	14
(Chinese Taipei) Hsieh P-c (Chinese Taipei) Wu T-j	12	6
5	(Japan) S Matsuo (Japan) M Naito	21	21
(India) R Mukherjee (India) A Baliyan	7	14
(Indonesia) A S Awanda (Indonesia) N K Mahadewi Istirani	21	21
(India) S Panchal (India) T Dahiya	2	2
2	(South Korea) Jung K-e (South Korea) Shin S-c	21	21

Second Round
Q2	(India) S P Ram (India) A S Sunil	9	11
5	(Japan) S Matsuo (Japan) M Naito	21	21
(Indonesia) A S Awanda (Indonesia) N K Mahadewi Istirani	14	17
2	(South Korea) Jung K-e (South Korea) Shin S-c	21	21

Quarterfinals
5	(Japan) S Matsuo (Japan) M Naito	9	13
2	(South Korea) Jung K-e (South Korea) Shin S-c	21	21

== Mixed doubles ==
=== Seeds ===
1. (South Korea) Ko Sung-hyun / Kim Ha-na (withdrawn)
2. (Indonesia) Praveen Jordan / Debby Susanto (champion)
3. (South Korea) Shin Baek-cheol / Chae Yoo-jung (semifinals)
4. (South Korea) Choi Sol-gyu / Eom Hye-won (second round)
5. (Netherlands) Jacco Arends / Selena Piek (first round)
6. (Malaysia) Chan Peng Soon / Goh Liu Ying (quarterfinals)
7. (Germany) Michael Fuchs / Birgit Michels (quarterfinals)
8. (Indonesia) Ronald Alexander / Melati Daeva Oktaviani (quarterfinals)

=== Finals ===
Semifinals
PFQ	(Thailand) Dechapol Puavaranukroh (Thailand) Sapsiree Taerattanachai	19	21	21
(Japan) Kenta Kazuno (Japan) Ayane Kurihara	21	9	17
3	(South Korea) Shin Baek-cheol (South Korea) Chae Yoo-jung	21	11	16
2	(Indonesia) Praveen Jordan (Indonesia) Debby Susanto	18	21	21

Final
PFQ	(Thailand) Dechapol Puavaranukroh (Thailand) Sapsiree Taerattanachai	25	9	16
2	(Indonesia) Praveen Jordan (Indonesia) Debby Susanto	23	21	21

=== Top half ===
==== Section 1 ====
First Round
PFQ	(Thailand) D Puavaranukroh (Thailand) S Taerattanachai	18	21	21
(Indonesia) H Faisal (Indonesia) S D Aulia	21	12	11
Q3	(China) He JT (China) Du Y	21	21
(India) V G Prasad (India) J Dewangan	10	9
8	(Indonesia) R Alexander (Indonesia) M D Oktaviani	21	21
PFQ	(India) A Nair (India) S Nagarkoti	10	6
(Thailand) S Prapakamol (Thailand) S Thoungthongkam	21	21
(Chinese Taipei) Wang C-l (Chinese Taipei) Lee C-h	16	12

Second Round
PFQ	(Thailand) D Puavaranukroh (Thailand) S Taerattanachai	21	21
Q3	(China) He JT (China) Du Y	15	13
8	(Indonesia) R Alexander (Indonesia) M D Oktaviani	21	21
(Thailand) S Prapakamol (Thailand) S Thoungthongkam	15	17

Quarterfinals
PFQ	(Thailand) D Puavaranukroh (Thailand) S Taerattanachai	18	21	21
8	(Indonesia) R Alexander (Indonesia) M D Oktaviani	21	19	17

==== Section 2 ====
First Round
4	(South Korea) Choi S-g (South Korea) Eom H-w	21	21
PFQ	(India) K Singh (India) K Antil	7	10
(India) M Attri (India) A Ponnappa	21	12	11
(Japan) K Kazuno (Japan) A Kurihara	15	21	21
6	(Malaysia) Chan P S (Malaysia) Goh L Y	21	21
PFQ	(India) B Chakraborty (India) R Sahdev	18	15
Q1	(India) P J Chopra (India) N S Reddy	21	21
(India) C Tripathi (India) D S Kalyani	3	11

Second Round
4	(South Korea) Choi S-g (South Korea) Eom H-w	18	21	14
(Japan) K Kazuno (Japan) A Kurihara	21	17	21
6	(Malaysia) Chan P S (Malaysia) Goh L Y	21	21
Q1	(India) P J Chopra (India) N S Reddy	14	17

Quarterfinals
(Japan) K Kazuno (Japan) A Kurihara	21	21
6	(Malaysia) Chan P S (Malaysia) Goh L Y	14	15

=== Bottom half ===
==== Section 3 ====
First Round
(Egypt) A Kashkal (Egypt) H Hosny	13	11
(Russia) R Kargaev (Russia) E Bolotova	21	21
(Thailand) B Issara (Thailand) S Amitrapai	21	21
5	(Netherlands) J Arends (Netherlands) S Piek	15	11
(France) R Labar (France) E Lefel	7	21	20
Q2	(Malaysia) Y Khrishnan (India) P Sawant	21	18	22
(Singapore) D B Chrisnanta (Singapore) Vanessa Neo Y Y	18	15
3	(South Korea) Shin B-c (South Korea) Chae Y-j	21	21

Second Round
(Russia) R Kargaev (Russia) E Bolotova	4	11
(Thailand) B Issara (Thailand) S Amitrapai	21	21
Q2	(Malaysia) Y Khrishnan (India) P Sawant	11	9
3	(South Korea) Shin B-c (South Korea) Chae Y-j	21	21

Quarterfinals
(Thailand) B Issara (Thailand) S Amitrapai	17	21	14
3	(South Korea) Shin B-c (South Korea) Chae Y-j	21	15	21

==== Section 4 ====
First Round
PFQ	(India) D Chaudhry (India) L Dahiya	7	9
(United States) P Chew (United States) J Subandhi	21	21
(Russia) E Dremin (Russia) E Dimova	13	14
7	(Germany) M Fuchs (Germany) B Michels	21	21
(India) A Vishnu (India) A Balan	21	21
Q4	(India) S Rankireddy (India) K Maneesha	17	18
(South Korea) Kim G-j (South Korea) Shin S-c	18	14
2	(Indonesia) P Jordan (Indonesia) D Susanto	21	21

Second Round
(United States) P Chew (United States) J Subandhi	15	12
7	(Germany) M Fuchs (Germany) B Michels	21	21
(India) A Vishnu (India) A Balan	13	17
2	(Indonesia) P Jordan (Indonesia) D Susanto	21	21

Quarterfinals
7	(Germany) M Fuchs (Germany) B Michels	16	18
2	(Indonesia) P Jordan (Indonesia) D Susanto	21	21

Preceded by 2016 Malaysia Masters Grand Prix Gold	BWF Grand Prix and Grand Prix Gold; 2016 BWF Season	Succeeded by 2016 Thailand Masters Grand Prix Gold
