= Martin Campbell (badminton) =

Scottish badminton player (born 1990)

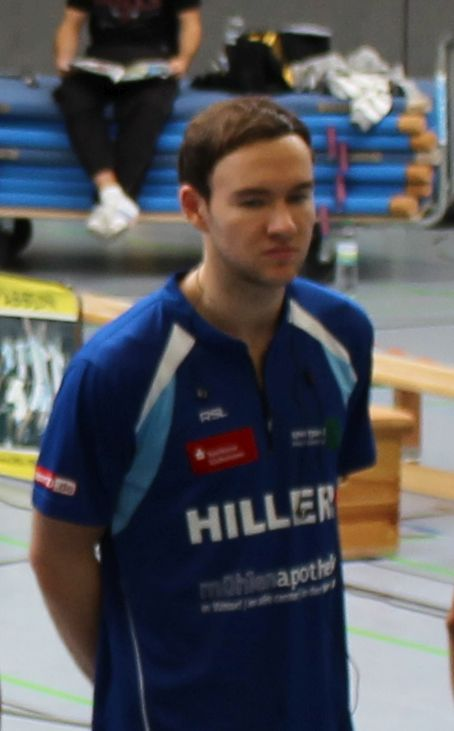
- Martin Campbell on 12 October 2014

Personal information
- Born: 26 July 1990 (age 36) Edinburgh, Scotland
- Years active: 2007
- Height: 1.84 m (6 ft 0 in)
- Weight: 73 kg (161 lb)

Sport
- Country: Scotland
- Sport: Badminton
- Handedness: Right
- Coached by: Wong Tat Meng; Andrew Bowman

Men's & mixed doubles
- Highest ranking: 52 (MD 26 October 2017; 101 (XD 13 July 2017)
- BWF profile
Medal record
Men's badminton
Representing Scotland
Commonwealth Youth Games
Bronze medal – third place	2008 Pune	Boys' singles

Martin Campbell (born 26 July 1990) is a Scottish badminton player from BC Adliswil Zurich. Campbell started playing badminton when he was around seven years old, and joined the national team in 2008. He was the bronze medalist at the 2008 Commonwealth Youth Games in Pune, India, and competed at the 2014 and 2018 Commonwealth Games. He won his first National Championships title in 2015.

Campbell graduated from Loughborough University with a first class honours degree.

Campbell announced his retirement from full-time badminton in July 2018, and amassed 29 Scotland caps since 2010.

== Achievements ==
=== Commonwealth Youth Games ===
Boys' singles
Year	Venue	Opponent	Score	Result
2008	Shree Shiv Chhatrapati Sports Complex; Pune, India	(Scotland) Paul van Rietvelde	21–13, 21–17	Bronze

=== BWF International Challenge/Series ===
Men's doubles
Year	Tournament	Partner	Opponent	Score	Result
2018	Swedish Open	(Scotland) Patrick MacHugh	(New Zealand) Oliver Leydon-Davis (Denmark) Lasse Mølhede	17–21, 12–21	(silver) Runner-up
2016	Estonian International	(Scotland) Patrick MacHugh	(Germany) Jones Ralfy Jansen (Germany) Josche Zurwonne	15–21, 18–21	(silver) Runner-up
2015	Hungarian International	(Scotland) Patrick MacHugh	(Denmark) Soren Gravholt (Denmark) Nikolaj Overgaard	21–13, 18–21, 21–16	(gold) Winner
2015	Portugal International	(Scotland) Patrick MacHugh	(England) Peter Briggs (England) Tom Wolfenden	17–21, 20–22	(silver) Runner-up
2015	Iceland International	(Scotland) Patrick MacHugh	(Denmark) Frederik Aalestrup (Denmark) Kasper Dinesen	21–16, 21–17	(gold) Winner
2014	Portugal International	(Scotland) Patrick MacHugh	(Japan) Kazuki Matsumaru (Japan) Izumi Okoshi	21–18, 13–21, 17–21	(silver) Runner-up
2014	Iceland International	(Scotland) Patrick MacHugh	(Belgium) Mattijs Dierickx (Belgium) Freek Golinski	21–15, 12–21, 21–14	(gold) Winner
2013	Bulgaria Eurasia Open	(Scotland) Patrick MacHugh	(Wales) Joe Morgan (Wales) Nic Strange	25–23, 21–10	(gold) Winner
2012	Iceland International	(Scotland) Patrick MacHugh	(Wales) Joe Morgan (Wales) Nic Strange	17–21, 16–21	(silver) Runner-up
2012	Irish International	(Scotland) Angus Gilmour	(Wales) Daniel Font (Wales) Oliver Gwilt	21–12, 24–26, 16–21	(silver) Runner-up
2011	Welsh International	(Scotland) Angus Gilmour	(England) Christopher Coles (England) Matthew Nottingham	19–21, 7–21	(silver) Runner-up
2010	Bulgarian International	(Scotland) Angus Gilmour	(England) Marcus Ellis (England) Peter Mills	14–21, 10–21	(silver) Runner-up

Mixed doubles
Year	Tournament	Partner	Opponent	Score	Result
2014	Romanian International	(Scotland) Jillie Cooper	(France) Bastian Kersaudy (France) Teshana Vignes Waran	21–14, 21–15	(gold) Winner
2011	Welsh International	(Malaysia) Ng Hui Lin	(England) Peter Briggs (Malaysia) Ng Hui Ern	21–16, 21–19	(gold) Winner

BWF International Challenge tournament
BWF International Series tournament
BWF Future Series tournament
