= Panuga Riou =

English badminton player (born 1992)

Personal information
- Born: 13 March 1992 (age 34) Bangkok, Thailand
- Height: 1.67 m (5 ft 6 in)

Sport
- Country: England
- Sport: Badminton
- Handedness: Right
- Coached by: Steve Butler; Julia Mann

Women's singles
- Highest ranking: 78 (WS 16 October 2014); 282 (WD 29 September 2011)
- BWF profile
Medal record
Women's badminton
Representing England
Commonwealth Youth Games
Bronze medal – third place	2008 Pune	Girls' singles
European Junior Championships
Bronze medal – third place	2009 Milan	Mixed team

Panuga Riou (born 13 March 1992) is an English badminton player. She started playing badminton at age 10, and in 2012 she became the finalist of the Polish International tournament. She earned a Sport and Social Science degree at the University of Bath.

== Achievements ==
=== Commonwealth Youth Games ===
Girls' singles

Year	Venue	Opponent	Score	Result
2008	Shree Shiv Chhatrapati Sports Complex, Pune, India	(Malaysia) Tiffany Chase Currier	18–21, 21–16, 21–16	Bronze

=== BWF International Challenge/Series ===
Women's singles

Year	Tournament	Opponent	Score	Result
2012	Polish International	(Scotland) Kirsty Gilmour	12–21, 12–21	(silver) Runner-up
2013	Slovak Open	(Netherlands) Kirsten van der Valk	21–16, 21–11	(gold) Winner
2014	Polish International	(Turkey) Özge Bayrak	11–9, 8–11, 11–6, 11–7	(gold) Winner
2016	Bulgarian International	(Malaysia) Lyddia Cheah	21–15, 21–16	(gold) Winner

BWF International Challenge tournament
BWF International Series tournament
BWF Future Series tournament
