= Badminton at the 2008 Commonwealth Youth Games =

Badminton championships

2008 Commonwealth Youth Games
Tournament details
- Dates: 13 October – 17 October
- Edition: 2nd
- Competitors: 90
- Venue: Shree Shiv Chhatrapati Sports Complex
- Location: Mahalunge, Balewadi, Pune, India

Badminton events for the 2008 Commonwealth Youth Games were held in Pune in the Indian state of Maharashtra from 13 to 17 October. For the second consecutive time, sport of Badminton was included in the Commonwealth Youth Games programme which included Boys' singles, Girls' singles, Boys' doubles and Girls' doubles events. Mixed doubles was not conducted. At the end, host India emerged as the strongest nation by winning three titles, while Malaysia won the Boys' doubles title.

== Medalists ==
Discipline	Gold	Silver	Bronze
Boys' singles	(India) Gurusai Dutt	(India) Aditya Prakash	(Scotland) Martin Campbell
Girls' singles	(India) Saina Nehwal	(India) N. Sikki Reddy	(England) Panuga Riou
Boys' doubles	(Malaysia) Ow Yao Han (Malaysia) Yew Hong Kheng	(Malaysia) Lim Yu Sheng (Malaysia) Loh Wei Sheng	(India) B. Sai Praneeth (India) Pranav Chopra
Girls' doubles	(India) P. C. Thulasi (India) N. Sikki Reddy	(Canada) Alexandra Bruce (Canada) Michelle Li	(Malaysia) Lim Ee Von (Malaysia) Ng Hui Ern

== Results ==
=== Boys' singles ===
Semifinal
(India) Gurusai Dutt	21	21
(Scotland) Paul van Rietvelde	13	12
(Scotland) Martin Campbell	14	17
(India) Aditya Prakash	21	21

Final
(India) Gurusai Dutt	21	20	21
(India) Aditya Prakash	18	22	18
Third place
(Scotland) Paul van Rietvelde	13	17
(Scotland) Martin Campbell	21	21

=== Girls' singles ===
Semifinal
(India) Saina Nehwal	21	21
(England) Panuga Riou	12	10
(Malaysia) Tiffany Chase Currier	16	9
(India) N. Sikki Reddy	21	21

Final
(India) Saina Nehwal	23	22
(India) N. Sikki Reddy	21	20
Third place
(England) Panuga Riou	18	21	21
(Malaysia) Tiffany Chase Currier	21	16	16

=== Boys' doubles ===
Semi-finals
(India) B. Sai Praneeth (India) Pranav Chopra	20	16
(Malaysia) Ow Yao Han (Malaysia) Yew Hong Kheng	22	21
(England) Gary Fox (England) Richard Morris	19	17
(Malaysia) Lim Yu Sheng (Malaysia) Loh Wei Sheng	21	21

Final
(Malaysia) Ow Yao Han (Malaysia) Yew Hong Kheng	14	21	21
(Malaysia) Lim Yu Sheng (Malaysia) Loh Wei Sheng	21	13	14
Third place
(India) B. Sai Praneeth (India) Pranav Chopra	21	23
(England) Gary Fox (England) Richard Morris	18	21

=== Girls' doubles ===
Semi-finals
(Malaysia) Lim Ee Von (Malaysia) Ng Hui Ern	19	10
(Canada) Alexandra Bruce (Canada) Michelle Li	21	21
(New Zealand) Jessica Jonggowisastro (New Zealand) Mary O'Connor	13	13
(India) P. C. Thulasi (India) N. Sikki Reddy	21	21

Final
(Canada) Alexandra Bruce (Canada) Michelle Li	18	8
(India) P. C. Thulasi (India) N. Sikki Reddy	21	21
Third place
(Malaysia) Lim Ee Von (Malaysia) Ng Hui Ern	21	21
(New Zealand) Jessica Jonggowisastro (New Zealand) Mary O'Connor	8	19
