= Pranav Chopra =

Indian badminton player (born 1992)

Pranaav Chopra
Personal information
- Nickname: Jerry
- Born: Pranaav Jerry Chopra; 6 September 1992 (age 34) Mullanpur Dakha, Ludhiana, India
- Years active: 2007
- Height: 1.89 m (6 ft 2 in)
- Weight: 82 kg (181 lb)

Sport
- Country: India
- Sport: Badminton
- Handedness: Right
- Coached by: Pullela Gopichand

Men's & mixed doubles
- Highest ranking: 28 (MD 24 November 2016); 13 (XD 23 March 2017)
- Current ranking: 33 (XD 26 March 2021)
- BWF profile
Medal record
Men's badminton
Representing India
Commonwealth Games
Gold medal – first place	2018 Gold Coast	Mixed team
Asia Team Championships
Bronze medal – third place	2016 Hyderabad	Men's team
South Asian Games
Gold medal – first place	2016 Guwahati-Shillong	Mixed doubles
Gold medal – first place	2016 Guwahati-Shillong	Men's team
Silver medal – second place	2016 Guwahati-Shillong	Men's doubles
Commonwealth Youth Games
Bronze medal – third place	2008 Pune	Boys' doubles
Asian Junior Championships
Bronze medal – third place	2009 Kuala Lumpur	Mixed doubles

Pranaav Jerry Chopra (born 6 September 1992) is an Indian badminton player. He joined the India national badminton team in 2007. In the year 2018, at the Commonwealth Games held in Gold Coast, Queensland, he won the gold medal in mixed team as being a member of the Indian mixed team. He is only the second player from India to reach Top 15 in the World Rankings in Mixed Doubles with his partner.

== Childhood and early training ==
Pranaav started training at the age of 7. He became the national champion twice in the boys doubles U-13 and U-19 events. At the U-19 level, he won a record nine titles in a year. If he is in the city, he used to train at Badminton Academy in the Shastri Hall, at Ludhiana. He lived in South City and later he joined Gopichand Badminton Academy, Hyderabad. He practiced eight hours and like to play doubles and mixed doubles instead of singles matches. He was coached by Pullela Gopichand. Pranaav has won medals in several national ranking tournaments. In the Youth Commonwealth Games, Pune, he won a bronze medal, at Fajr Senior International Challenge Cup in Tehran, Iran he won a gold medal and at Tata International Challenge in Mumbai he ended up winning a gold medal and in Bern, Switzerland at The Swiss International Challenge he won a silver medal.

== Career ==
=== 2007 ===
In 2007, Pranaav made his international debut in the Milo Junior Tournament held in Bandang, Thailand.

=== 2008 ===
In 2008, Balewadi Sports Complex, Pune, Pranaav won the bronze medal at the Commonwealth Youth Games in the boys' doubles event partnered with B. Sai Praneeth.

=== 2010 ===
In 2010, Pranaav became the national champion in the mixed doubles event in the National Games.

=== 2011 ===
In 2011, Bern, Switzerland, Swiss International Challenge Pranaav won a silver medal in men's doubles event.

=== 2013 ===
In 2013, Pranaav became the national champion in men's doubles event in the National Games.

=== 2014 ===
Pranaav competed at the 2014 Asian Games and in the 2014 Commonwealth Games, in the mixed team bronze medal match, Indian mixed team went down to the Singapore mixed team by a score of 2-3 and eventually Indian mixed team lost the bronze medal.

=== 2016 ===
In 2016, Pranaav won two Grand Prix titles with his mixed doubles partner N. Sikki Reddy in the form of Brasil Open and Russian Open. Later in the same year, he married his playing companion and an Indian badminton player, Pradnya Gadre.

=== 2018 ===
In the Commonwealth Games held in Gold Coast, Queensland, Pranaav paired with his mixed doubles partner, Gadde Ruthvika Shivani defeated Sri Lankan mixed doubles team led by Sachin Dias and Thilini Pramodika Hendahewa by 21–15, 19–21, 22-20 and gave Indian mixed team a lead for the run for the gold medal. Lastly, Indian mixed team defeated Sri Lanka's mixed team by 5–0 in all the five matches and thus Pranaav won the gold medal in mixed team as being a member of the Indian mixed team.

== Achievements ==
=== South Asian Games ===
Men's doubles
Year	Venue	Partner	Opponent	Score	Result
2016	Multipurpose Hall SAI–SAG Centre; Shillong, India	(India) Akshay Dewalkar	(India) Manu Attri (India) B. Sumeeth Reddy	18–21, 17–21	Silver

Mixed doubles
Year	Venue	Partner	Opponent	Score	Result
2016	Multipurpose Hall SAI–SAG Centre; Shillong, India	(India) N. Sikki Reddy	(India) Manu Attri (India) Ashwini Ponnappa	30–29, 21–17	Gold

=== Commonwealth Youth Games ===
Boys' doubles
Year	Venue	Partner	Opponent	Score	Result
2008	Shree Shiv Chhatrapati Sports Complex; Pune, India	(India) B. Sai Praneeth	(England) Gary Fox (England) Richard Morris	21–18, 23–21	Bronze

=== Asian Junior Championships ===
Mixed doubles
Year	Venue	Partner	Opponent	Score	Result
2009	Stadium Juara; Kuala Lumpur, Malaysia	(India) Prajakta Sawant	(China) Lu Kai (China) Bao Yixin	12–21, 15–21	Bronze

=== BWF World Tour (1 runner-up) ===
The BWF World Tour, announced on 19 March 2017 and implemented in 2018, is a series of elite badminton tournaments, sanctioned by Badminton World Federation (BWF). The BWF World Tour are divided into six levels, namely World Tour Finals, Super 1000, Super 750, Super 500, Super 300 (part of the HSBC World Tour), and the BWF Tour Super 100.

Mixed doubles
Year	Tournament	Level	Partner	Opponent	Score	Result
2018	Hyderabad Open	Super 100	(India) N. Sikki Reddy	(Indonesia) Akbar Bintang Cahyono (Indonesia) Winny Oktavina Kandow	21–15, 19–21, 23–25	(silver) Runner-up

=== BWF Grand Prix (3 titles, 2 runners-up) ===
The BWF Grand Prix has two levels, the BWF Grand Prix and Grand Prix Gold. It is a series of badminton tournaments sanctioned by the Badminton World Federation (BWF) since 2007.

Men's doubles
Year	Tournament	Partner	Opponent	Score	Result
2016	Syed Modi International	(India) Akshay Dewalkar	(Malaysia) Goh V Shem (Malaysia) Tan Wee Kiong	21–14, 22–24, 8–21	(silver) Runner-up

Mixed doubles
Year	Tournament	Partner	Opponent	Score	Result
2017	Syed Modi International	(India) N. Sikki Reddy	(India) B. Sumeeth Reddy (India) Ashwini Ponnappa	22–20, 21–10	(gold) Winner
2016	Scottish Open	(India) N. Sikki Reddy	(Malaysia) Goh Soon Huat (Malaysia) Shevon Jemie Lai	21–13, 18–21, 16–21	(silver) Runner-up
2016	Russian Open	(India) N. Sikki Reddy	(Russia) Vladimir Ivanov (Russia) Valeria Sorokina	21–17, 21–19	(gold) Winner
2016	Brasil Open	(India) N. Sikki Reddy	(Canada) Toby Ng (Canada) Rachel Honderich	21–15, 21–16	(gold) Winner

BWF Grand Prix Gold tournament
BWF Grand Prix tournament

=== BWF International Challenge/Series (3 titles, 2 runners-up) ===
Men's doubles
Year	Tournament	Partner	Opponent	Score	Result
2015	Tata Open India International	(India) Akshay Dewalkar	(Thailand) Wannawat Ampunsuwan (Thailand) Tinn Isriyanate	14–21, 9–21	(silver) Runner-up
2015	Bangladesh International	(India) Akshay Dewalkar	(Malaysia) Tan Chee Tean (Malaysia) Tan Wee Gieen	21–16, 21–16	(gold) Winner
2011	Tata Open India International	(India) Akshay Dewalkar	(India) K. T. Rupesh Kumar (India) Sanave Thomas	19–21, 21–17, 23–21	(gold) Winner
2011	Swiss International	(India) Akshay Dewalkar	(Poland) Lukasz Moren (Poland) Wojciech Szkudlarczyk	21–17, 16–21, 12–21	(silver) Runner-up
2010	Iran Fajr International	(India) B. Sai Praneeth	(Iran) Ali Shahhosseini (Iran) Mohammadreza Kheradmandi	21–17, 21–11	(gold) Winner

BWF International Challenge tournament
BWF International Series tournament
