= Gurusai Dutt =

Indian badminton player

Personal information
- Born: Rajah Menuri Venkata Gurusaidutt; 1 March 1990 (age 36) Bheemavaram, West Godavari district, Andhra Pradesh, India
- Height: 5 ft 8 in (173 cm)

Sport
- Country: India
- Sport: Badminton
- Handedness: Right
- Coached by: Pullela Gopichand
- Retired: 6 June 2022

Men's singles
- Career record: 198 wins, 123 losses
- Highest ranking: 19 (28 November 2013)
- BWF profile
Medal record
Men's badminton
Representing India
Commonwealth Games
Bronze medal – third place	2014 Glasgow	Men's singles
South Asian Games
Gold medal – first place	2010 Dhaka	Men's team
Silver medal – second place	2010 Dhaka	Men's singles
World Junior Championships
Bronze medal – third place	2008 Pune	Boys' singles
Commonwealth Youth Games
Gold medal – first place	2008 Pune	Boys' singles

Rajah Menuri Venkata Gurusaidutt (born 1 March 1990), known as Gurusai Dutt, is a badminton player from India. He trains at the Hyderabad's Gopichand Badminton Academy. He won the gold medal at the 2008 Commonwealth Youth Games and the bronze medal at the 2014 Commonwealth Games in Glasgow.

He competed at the 2014 Asian Games.

== Career ==
=== Early career ===
Gurusai Dutt took up badminton as a sport after watching Pullela Gopichand, the 2001 All England champion, play at a local stadium. In 2005, he won the sub-junior national doubles title and also qualified for the sub-junior ABC Championship. This, according to him, spurred him to focus entirely on the sport. He started his training with Gopichand.

In the international circuit, Gurusai Dutt first appeared in the boys doubles category at the 2006 World Junior Championships. The pair of Gurusai Dutt and K. Tarun progressed only until the second round. The Hindu praised the enthusiastic effort and fighting quality of the pair's game play. He represented India in the team event category, but failed to win his singles match against a Thailand opponent. Gurusai Dutt won the 2007 Andhra Pradesh Senior Badminton Championships after defeating the top seed – his first title. He played a vastly superior and controlled game and he looked the better player.

=== Foray into international circuit ===
Gurusai Dutt won the bronze medal at the 2008 BWF World Junior Championships that was held in Pune. While he was India's National Junior Champion, Gurusai Dutt won the 2008 Dutch Junior International that was held in Haarlem. He became the first Indian to win this title. This win was seen as a good sign for India's chances at the 2008 Commonwealth Youth Games.

Carrying his form into the upcoming tournaments, Gurusai Dutt won the singles title at the Commonwealth Youth Games and Bahrain International Challenge badminton championship by the end of 2008. In 2009, he reached the quarterfinals of the 2009 Denmark Super Series. At the 2010 Yonex Sunrise India Open Badminton Championships, Gurusai Dutt created an upset in the quarterfinal by defeating former All England Champion, Muhammad Hafiz Hashim. Both Hashim and the media reports praised him for his game play. In the same year, Gurusai Dutt represented India at the South Asian Games. He not only won the silver medal in the singles event but also the gold medal in the team event category.

=== Retirement ===
Gurusai Dutt announced his retirement from professional badminton through social media on 6 June 2022. After his retirement he started as a badminton coach, helping players like Prannoy H. S..

== Achievements ==
=== Commonwealth Games ===
Men's singles
Year	Venue	Opponent	Score	Result
2014	Emirates Arena; Glasgow, Scotland	(England) Rajiv Ouseph	21–15, 14–21, 21–19	Bronze

=== South Asian Games ===
Men's singles
Year	Venue	Opponent	Score	Result
2010	Wooden-Floor Gymnasium; Dhaka, Bangladesh	(India) Chetan Anand	16–21, 8–21	Silver

=== World Junior Championships ===
Boys' singles
Year	Venue	Opponent	Score	Result
2008	Badminton Hall Shree Shiv Chhatrapati; Pune, India	(China) Wang Zhengming	16–21, 21–17, 17–21	Bronze

=== Commonwealth Youth Games ===
Boys' singles
Year	Venue	Opponent	Score	Result
2008	Shree Shiv Chhatrapati Sports Complex; Pune, India	(India) Aditya Prakash	21–18, 20–22, 21–18	Gold

=== BWF Grand Prix ===
The BWF Grand Prix has two levels, the BWF Grand Prix and Grand Prix Gold. It is a series of badminton tournaments sanctioned by the Badminton World Federation (BWF) since 2007.

Men's singles
Year	Tournament	Opponent	Score	Result
2010	India Open	(Indonesia) Alamsyah Yunus	13–21, 18–21	(silver) Runner-up

BWF Grand Prix Gold tournament
BWF Grand Prix tournament

=== BWF International Challenge/Series ===
Men's singles
Year	Tournament	Opponent	Score	Result
2017	Welsh International	(Republic of Ireland) Nhat Nguyen	16–21, 21–23	(silver) Runner-up
2017	Bulgarian International	(Turkey) Muhammed Ali Kurt	21–17, 21–16	(gold) Winner
2015	Bulgarian International	(Spain) Pablo Abián	17–21, 21–16, 19–21	(silver) Runner-up
2014	Tata Open India International	(India) Prannoy H. S.	16–21, 22–20, 17–21	(silver) Runner-up
2012	Tata Open India International	(India) B. Sai Praneeth	21–19, 21–12	(gold) Winner
2011	Tata Open India International	(Indonesia) Alamsyah Yunus	17–21, 22–24	(silver) Runner-up
2008	Bahrain International	(Indonesia) Andi Saputro Nugroho	21–13, 22–20	(gold) Winner

BWF International Challenge tournament
BWF International Series tournament
BWF Future Series tournament
