= Sannatasah Saniru =

Malaysian badminton player (born 1990)

Personal information
- Born: 15 May 1990 (age 36) Sabah, Malaysia
- Height: 1.66 m (5 ft 5 in)

Sport
- Country: Malaysia
- Sport: Badminton
- Handedness: Right

Women's singles & doubles
- Highest ranking: 59 (WS 4 April 2013); 40 (WD 2 March 2017); 73 (XD 12 June 2014)
- BWF profile
Medal record
Women's badminton
Representing Malaysia
Southeast Asian Games
Gold medal – first place	2009 Vientiane	Women's team
Summer Universiade
Bronze medal – third place	2015 Gwangju	Mixed team
World Junior Championships
Bronze medal – third place	2008 Pune	Mixed team
Asian Junior Championships
Bronze medal – third place	2008 Kuala Lumpur	Mixed team

Sannatasah Saniru (born 15 May 1990) is a badminton player from Malaysia. Her brother, Vountus Indra Mawan also a former Malaysia national player.

== Career ==
Saniru was accepted at the Bukit Jalil Sports School at the age of 13, then she join the Malaysia national team. In 2008, she won the mixed team bronze at the Asian and World Junior Championships, and in 2009, she won the women' team gold at the Southeast Asian Games. In 2010, she was selected to compete at the Uber Cup, and also Guangzhou Asian Games. She quits the national team in 2013, and started to playing under the Suruhanjaya Perkhidamtan badminton club. She stated in her resignation letter that she did not get as many opportunities as the other players to compete, and there had been no improvement in her game. In 2015, she took part at the Summer Universiade in Gwangju, South Korea, and won a bronze medal in the mixed team event.

== Achievements ==
=== BWF International Challenge/Series (1 title, 5 runners-up) ===
Women's singles
Year	Tournament	Opponent	Score	Result
2013	Bahrain International	(India) Saili Rane	21–14, 19–21, 17–21	(silver) Runner-up
2012	French International	(Netherlands) Judith Meulendijks	12–21, 15–21	(silver) Runner-up
2009	Iran Fajr International	(Turkey) Aprilsasi Putri Lejarsar Variella	21–17, 18–21, 17–21	(silver) Runner-up

Women's doubles
Year	Tournament	Partner	Opponent	Score	Result
2013	Victorian International	(Australia) Renuga Veeran	(Thailand) Ruethaichanok Laisuan (Thailand) Narissapat Lam	15–21, 14–21	(silver) Runner-up
2009	Iran Fajr International	(Malaysia) Vivian Hoo Kah Mun	(Turkey) Aprilsasi Putri Lejarsar Variella (Turkey) Ezgi Epice	21–9, 11–21, 9–21	(silver) Runner-up

Mixed doubles
Year	Tournament	Partner	Opponent	Score	Result
2013	Bangladesh International	(Malaysia) Muhammad Adib Haiqal Nurizwan	(India) Abhishek Ahlawat (India) Sanskriti Chhabra	21–10, 21–11	(gold) Winner

BWF International Challenge tournament
BWF International Series tournament
