= Aditya Prakash (badminton) =

Indian badminton player (born 1990)

Personal information
- Born: 7 September 1990 (age 36) India

Sport
- Country: India
- Sport: Badminton
- Handedness: Right

Men's singles
- Highest ranking: 112 (1 August 2012)
- BWF profile
Medal record
Men's badminton
Representing India
South Asian Games
Gold medal – first place	2010 Dhaka	Men's team
Commonwealth Youth Games
Silver medal – second place	2008 Pune	Boys' singles

Aditya Prakash (born 7 September 1990) is an Indian badminton player who currently plays singles. He was part of the national team that won the gold medal at the 2010 South Asian Games in Dhaka, Bangladesh. He competed at the 2008 Commonwealth Youth Games in Pune, won the gold medal in the team event and the silver medal in the boys' singles.

== Achievements ==
=== Commonwealth Youth Games ===
Boys' singles
Year	Venue	Opponent	Score	Result
2008	Shree Shiv Chhatrapati Sports Complex; Pune, India	(India) Gurusai Dutt	18–21, 22–20, 18–21	Silver
