= N. Sikki Reddy =

Indian badminton player

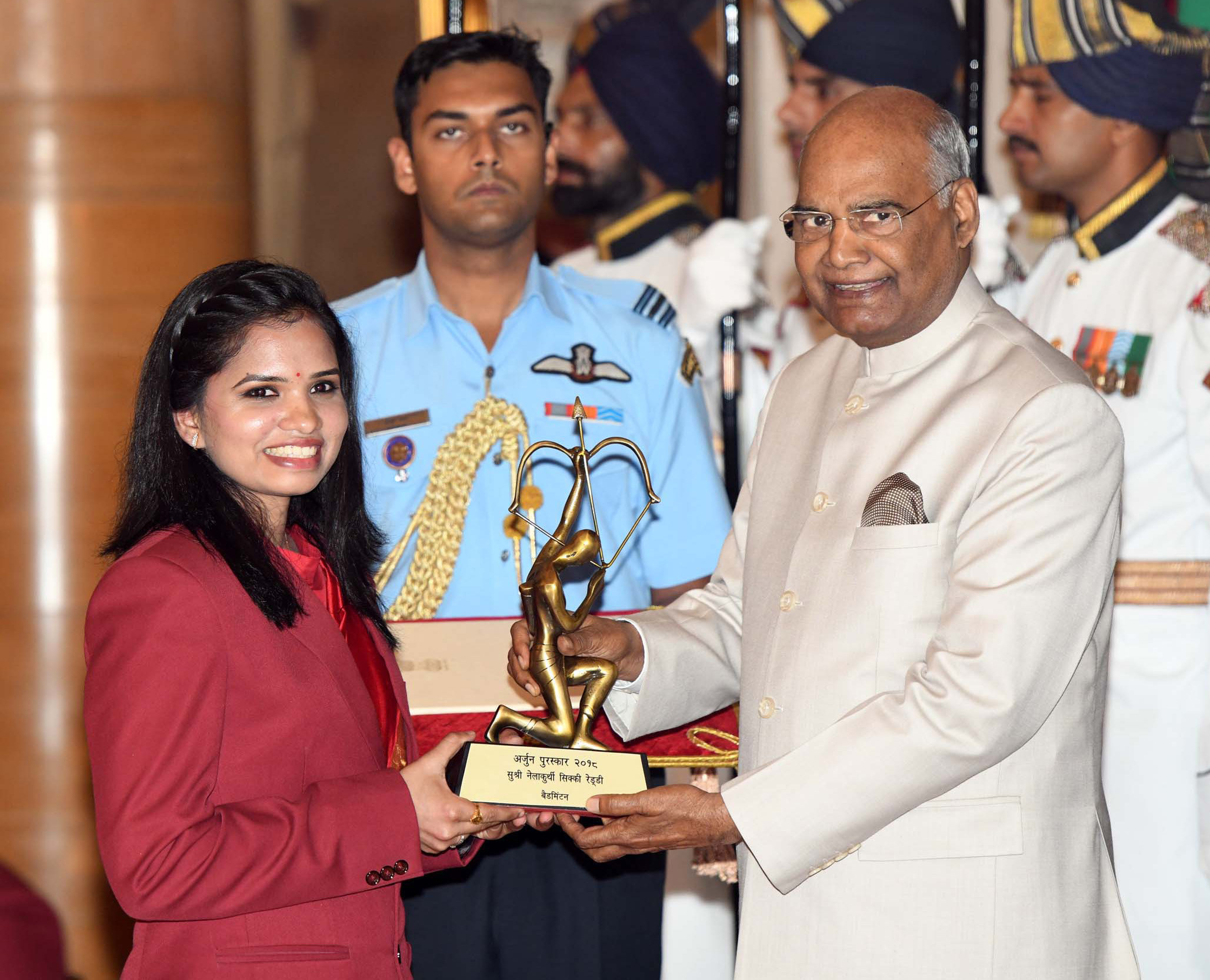
- President Ram Nath Kovind presents the Arjuna Award to Reddy in a ceremony in New Delhi on 25 September 2018.

Personal information
- Born: Nelakurthi Sikki; 18 August 1993 (age 33) Kodad, Telangana, India
- Height: 1.68 m (5 ft 6 in)
- Weight: 63 kg (139 lb)
- Spouse: B. Sumeeth Reddy (m. 2019)

Sport
- Country: India
- Sport: Badminton
- Handedness: Left
- Coached by: Pullela Gopichand

Women's & mixed doubles
- Highest ranking: 17 (WD with Ashwini Ponnappa, 13 August 2019); 13 (XD with Pranav Chopra, 23 March 2017)
- Current ranking: 25 (XD with B. Sumeeth Reddy, 18 March 2025)
- BWF profile
Medal record
Women's badminton
Representing India
Uber Cup
| Bronze medal – third place | 2014 New Delhi | Women's team |
| Bronze medal – third place | 2016 Kunshan | Women's team |
Commonwealth Games
| Gold medal – first place | 2018 Gold Coast | Mixed team |
| Bronze medal – third place | 2018 Gold Coast | Women's doubles |
Asian Games
| Bronze medal – third place | 2014 Incheon | Women's team |
South Asian Games
| Gold medal – first place | 2016 Guwahati-Shillong | Mixed doubles |
| Gold medal – first place | 2016 Guwahati–Shillong | Women's team |
| Gold medal – first place | 2019 Kathmandu–Pokhara | Women's team |
| Silver medal – second place | 2016 Guwahati–Shillong | Women's doubles |
| Bronze medal – third place | 2019 Kathmandu–Pokhara | Women's doubles |
Commonwealth Youth Games
| Gold medal – first place | 2008 Pune | Girls' doubles |
| Silver medal – second place | 2008 Pune | Girls' singles |

Nelakurihi Sikki Reddy (born 18 August 1993) is an Indian badminton player who plays doubles and mixed doubles. In 2016, she won the Brazil and Russia Open Grand Prix title in the mixed doubles event partnered with Pranaav Chopra. She and Chopra also won the gold medal at the South Asian Games.

== Achievements ==
=== Commonwealth Games ===
Women's doubles
| Year | Venue | Partner | Opponent | Score | Result |
|---|---|---|---|---|---|
| 2018 | Carrara Sports and Leisure Centre; Gold Coast, Australia | (India) Ashwini Ponnappa | (Australia) Setyana Mapasa (Australia) Gronya Somerville | 21–19, 21–19 | Bronze |

=== South Asian Games ===
Women's doubles
| Year | Venue | Partner | Opponent | Score | Result |
|---|---|---|---|---|---|
| 2016 | Multipurpose Hall SAI–SAG Centre; Shillong, India | (India) K. Maneesha | (India) Jwala Gutta (India) Ashwini Ponnappa | 9–21, 17–21 | Silver |
| 2019 | Badminton Covered Hall; Pokhara, Nepal | (India) Meghana Jakkampudi | (Sri Lanka) Thilini Hendahewa (Sri Lanka) Kavidi Sirimannage | 14–21, 18–21 | Bronze |

Mixed doubles
| Year | Venue | Partner | Opponent | Score | Result |
|---|---|---|---|---|---|
| 2016 | Multipurpose Hall SAI–SAG Centre; Shillong, India | (India) Pranaav Chopra | (India) Manu Attri (India) Ashwini Ponnappa | 30–29, 21–17 | Gold |

=== Commonwealth Youth Games ===
Girls' singles
| Year | Venue | Opponent | Score | Result |
|---|---|---|---|---|
| 2008 | Shree Shiv Chhatrapati Sports Complex, Pune, India | (India) Saina Nehwal | 21–23, 20–22 | Silver |

Girls' doubles
| Year | Venue | Partner | Opponent | Score | Result |
|---|---|---|---|---|---|
| 2008 | Shree Shiv Chhatrapati Sports Complex, Pune, India | (India) P. C. Thulasi | (Canada) Alexandra Bruce (Canada) Michelle Li | 21–18, 21–8 | Gold |

=== BWF World Tour (3 runners-up) ===
The BWF World Tour, which was announced on 19 March 2017 and implemented in 2018, is a series of elite badminton tournaments sanctioned by the Badminton World Federation (BWF). The BWF World Tours are divided into levels of World Tour Finals, Super 1000, Super 750, Super 500, Super 300 (part of the HSBC World Tour), and the BWF Tour Super 100.

Women's doubles
| Year | Tournament | Level | Partner | Opponent | Score | Result |
|---|---|---|---|---|---|---|
| 2018 | Syed Modi International | Super 300 | (India) Ashwini Ponnappa | (Malaysia) Chow Mei Kuan (Malaysia) Lee Meng Yean | 15–21, 13–21 | (silver) Runner-up |
| 2019 | Hyderabad Open | Super 100 | (India) Ashwini Ponnappa | (South Korea) Baek Ha-na (South Korea) Jung Kyung-eun | 17–21, 17–21 | (silver) Runner-up |

Mixed doubles
| Year | Tournament | Level | Partner | Opponent | Score | Result |
|---|---|---|---|---|---|---|
| 2018 | Hyderabad Open | Super 100 | (India) Pranaav Chopra | (Indonesia) Akbar Bintang Cahyono (Indonesia) Winny Oktavina Kandow | 21–15, 19–21, 23–25 | (silver) Runner-up |

=== BWF Grand Prix (3 titles, 2 runners-up) ===
The BWF Grand Prix had two levels, the Grand Prix and Grand Prix Gold. It was a series of badminton tournaments sanctioned by the Badminton World Federation (BWF) and played between 2007 and 2017.

Women's doubles
| Year | Tournament | Partner | Opponent | Score | Result |
|---|---|---|---|---|---|
| 2017 | Syed Modi International | (India) Ashwini Ponnappa | (Denmark) Christinna Pedersen (Denmark) Kamilla Rytter Juhl | 16–21, 18–21 | (silver) Runner-up |

Mixed doubles
| Year | Tournament | Partner | Opponent | Score | Result |
|---|---|---|---|---|---|
| 2016 | Brasil Open | (India) Pranaav Chopra | (Canada) Toby Ng (Canada) Rachel Honderich | 21–15, 21–16 | (gold) Winner |
| 2016 | Russian Open | (India) Pranaav Chopra | (Russia) Vladimir Ivanov (Russia) Valeria Sorokina | 21–17, 21–19 | (gold) Winner |
| 2016 | Scottish Open | (India) Pranaav Chopra | (Malaysia) Goh Soon Huat (Malaysia) Shevon Jemie Lai | 21–13, 18–21, 16–21 | (silver) Runner-up |
| 2017 | Syed Modi International | (India) Pranaav Chopra | (India) B. Sumeeth Reddy (India) Ashwini Ponnappa | 22–20, 21–10 | (gold) Winner |

BWF Grand Prix Gold tournament
BWF Grand Prix tournament

=== BWF International Challenge/Series (11 titles, 14 runners-up) ===
Women's doubles
| Year | Tournament | Partner | Opponent | Score | Result |
|---|---|---|---|---|---|
| 2009 | Smiling Fish International | (India) P. C. Thulasi | (Thailand) Porntip Buranaprasertsuk (Thailand) Sapsiree Taerattanachai | 19–21, 17–21 | (silver) Runner-up |
| 2011 | Bahrain International | (India) Aparna Balan | (Canada) Nicole Grether (Canada) Charmaine Reid | 10–21, 19–21 | (silver) Runner-up |
| 2012 | Tata Open India International | (India) Aparna Balan | (South Korea) Lee So-hee (South Korea) Shin Seung-chan | 21–19, 13–21, 17–21 | (silver) Runner-up |
| 2013 | Tata Open India International | (India) Pradnya Gadre | (India) Jwala Gutta (India) Ashwini Ponnappa | 21–19, 21–19 | (gold) Winner |
| 2013 | Bahrain International Challenge | (India) Pradnya Gadre | (India) Aparna Balan (India) Sanyogita Ghorpade | 21–13, 19–21, 21–5 | (gold) Winner |
| 2014 | Bangladesh International | (India) Pradnya Gadre | (Turkey) Özge Bayrak (Turkey) Neslihan Yiğit | 21–10, 22–24, 21–16 | (gold) Winner |
| 2015 | Uganda International | (India) Poorvisha S. Ram | (Iran) Negin Amiripour (Iran) Sorayya Aghaei | 11–7, 6–11, 8–11, 11–7, 11–3 | (gold) Winner |
| 2015 | Polish Open | (India) Pradnya Gadre | (Canada) Alex Bruce (Canada) Phyllis Chan | 21–16, 21–18 | (gold) Winner |
| 2015 | Lagos International | (India) Pradnya Gadre | (Turkey) Özge Bayrak (Turkey) Neslihan Yiğit | 21–19, 21–23, 21–15 | (gold) Winner |
| 2015 | Tata Open India International | (India) K. Maneesha | (Thailand) Chayanit Chaladchalam (Thailand) Phataimas Muenwong | 11–21, 21–15, 13–21 | (silver) Runner-up |
| 2016 | Welsh International | (India) Ashwini Ponnappa | (Russia) Anastasia Chervyakova (Russia) Olga Morozova | 16–21, 11–21 | (silver) Runner-up |
| 2019 | Maldives International | (India) Ashwini Ponnappa | (Japan) Sayaka Hobara (Japan) Natsuki Sone | 10–21, 21–17, 12–21 | (silver) Runner-up |
| 2021 | Denmark Masters | (India) Ashwini Ponnappa | (Denmark) Amalie Magelund (Denmark) Freja Ravn | 21–15, 19–21, 14–21 | (silver) Runner-up |

Mixed doubles
| Year | Tournament | Partner | Opponent | Score | Result |
|---|---|---|---|---|---|
| 2013 | Bahrain International | (India) Valiyaveetil Diju | (India) Arun Vishnu (India) Aparna Balan | 14–21, 23–25 | (silver) Runner-up |
| 2013 | Bahrain International Challenge | (India) Valiyaveetil Diju | (India) Sanave Thomas (India) Prajakta Sawant | 21–19, 14–21, 23–23 retired | (silver) Runner-up |
| 2014 | Tata Open India International | (India) Manu Attri | (India) Akshay Dewalkar (India) Pradnya Gadre | 21–19, 19–21, 21–10 | (gold) Winner |
| 2015 | Uganda International | (India) Tarun Kona | (Turkey) Muhammed Ali Kurt (Turkey) Kader İnal | 11–6, 11–4, 11–6 | (gold) Winner |
| 2015 | Lagos International | (India) Tarun Kona | (Poland) Robert Mateusiak (Poland) Nadieżda Zięba | 19–21, 7–21 | (silver) Runner-up |
| 2022 (II) | India International Challenge | (India) Rohan Kapoor | (Thailand) Ratchapol Makkasasithorn (Thailand) Chasinee Korepap | 22–20, 23–21 | (gold) Winner |
| 2022 (III) | India International Challenge | (India) Rohan Kapoor | (India) Sai Pratheek K. (India) Ashwini Ponnappa | 16–21, 21–11, 18–21 | (silver) Runner-up |
| 2022 | Maldives International | (India) Rohan Kapoor | (Algeria) Koceila Mammeri (Algeria) Tanina Mammeri | 21–16, 21–18 | (gold) Winner |
| 2023 | Slovenia Open | (India) Rohan Kapoor | (Denmark) Jesper Toft (Denmark) Clara Graversen | 12–21, 13–21 | (silver) Runner-up |
| 2023 | Denmark Masters | (India) Rohan Kapoor | (Denmark) Mads Vestergaard (Denmark) Christine Busch | 21–16, 21–17 | (gold) Winner |
| 2024 | Iran Fajr International | (India) B. Sumeeth Reddy | (India) Sathish Kumar Karunakaran (India) Aadya Variyath | 20–22, 14–21 | (silver) Runner-up |
| 2024 | Azerbaijan International | (India) B. Sumeeth Reddy | (India) Sathish Kumar Karunakaran (India) Aadya Variyath | 21–13, 20–22, 10–21 | (silver) Runner-up |

BWF International Challenge tournament
BWF International Series tournament

== Personal life ==
Sikki Reddy married her fellow badminton player B. Sumeeth Reddy in February 2019.
