= P. C. Thulasi =

Indian badminton player (born 1991)

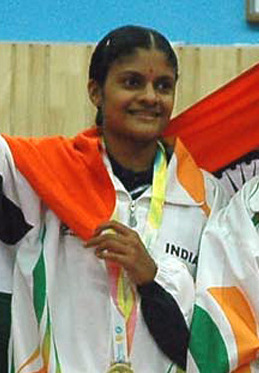
- Thulasi at the 2008 Commonwealth Youth Games

Personal information
- Born: Puthenpurayil Chandrika Thulasi; 31 August 1991 (age 35) Palakkad, Kerala, India
- Height: 1.63 m (5 ft 4 in)

Sport
- Country: India
- Sport: Badminton

Women's singles
- Highest ranking: 34 (26 February 2015)
- BWF profile
Medal record
Women's badminton
Representing India
Uber Cup
Bronze medal – third place	2014 New Delhi	Women's team
Bronze medal – third place	2016 Kunshan	Women's team
Asian Games
Bronze medal – third place	2014 Incheon	Women's team
South Asian Games
Gold medal – first place	2010 Dhaka	Women's team
Gold medal – first place	2016 Guwahati-Shillong	Women's team
Silver medal – second place	2010 Dhaka	Women's doubles
Commonwealth Youth Games
Gold medal – first place	2008 Pune	Girls' doubles

Puthenpurayil Chandrika Thulasi (born 31 August 1991) is an Indian badminton player. She was part of the national team that won the gold medals in 2010 and 2016 South Asian Games, also the women's doubles silver in 2010. Thulasi was the women's singles national champion in 2016, and the gold medalist in 34th National Games.

== Achievements ==
=== South Asian Games ===
Women's doubles
Year	Venue	Partner	Opponent	Score	Result
2010	Wooden-Floor Gymnasium; Dhaka, Bangladesh	(India) Ashwini Ponnappa	(India) Aparna Balan (India) Shruti Kurien	19–21, 20–22	Silver

=== Commonwealth Youth Games ===
Girls' doubles
Year	Venue	Partner	Opponent	Score	Result
2008	Shree Shiv Chhatrapati Sports Complex; Pune, India	(India) N. Sikki Reddy	(Canada) Alexandra Bruce (Canada) Michelle Li	21–18, 21–8	Gold

=== BWF International ===
Women's singles
Year	Tournament	Opponent	Score	Result
2010	Tata Open India International	(Indonesia) Fransisca Ratnasari	21–15, 21–13	(gold) Winner
2011	Maldives International	(India) P. V. Sindhu	11–21, 16–21	(silver) Runner-up
2012	Tata Open India International	(Indonesia) Febby Angguni	21–15, 21–13	(gold) Winner
2014	Sri Lanka International	(Singapore) Chen Jiayuan	17–21, 21–15, 21–18	(gold) Winner
2014	Bahrain International	(Indonesia) Russeli Hartawan	18–21, 23–21, 21–15	(gold) Winner

Women's doubles
Year	Tournament	Partner	Opponent	Score	Result
2009	Smiling Fish International	(India) N. Sikki Reddy	(Thailand) Porntip Buranaprasertsuk (Thailand) Sapsiree Taerattanachai	19–21, 17–21	(silver) Runner-up

BWF International Challenge tournament
BWF International Series tournament
BWF Future Series tournament
