= 2008 Commonwealth Youth Games =

Youth sporting event in India

III Commonwealth Youth Games तीसरा राष्ट्रमंडल युवा खेल
- Host city: Pune, Maharashtra, India
- Nations: 71
- Athletes: 1,300
- Events: 9 disciplines
- Opening: 12 October 2008
- Closing: 18 October 2008
- Opened by: President Pratibha Patil
- Main venue: Shree Shiv Chhatrapati Sports Complex
- Website: Official website

The 2008 Commonwealth Youth Games (Hindi: 2008 कॉमनवेल्थ यूथ गेम्स), officially known as the III Commonwealth Youth Games, and commonly known as Pune 2008, a regional sporting event that was held from 12 to 18 October 2008 in Pune, India, a city in the state of Maharashtra. They were the third Commonwealth Youth Games, which are held every four years; they were the first Commonwealth Youth Games to be held in Asia.

The III Commonwealth Youth Games were conducted from 12 to 18 October 2008. Over 1,300 athletes and 350 officials from 71 countries participated in these games.

The III Commonwealth Youth Games is unique for its green theme, which permeates all aspects of the Games. A special drive is being conducted by the game organisers to create a "save the tigers" campaign to promote awareness of the critical state of the Indian tiger.

== Sports ==
There were nine sports on the programme for the 2008 Games.

Each sport has a unique pictogram to represent it. The pictograms are designed to be, like the 2008 CYG logo, a balance between the cultural heritage of India and the modern India. The pictograms have been derived from the tribal art form of Warli.

- Athletics
- Badminton
- Boxing
- Shooting
- Swimming
- Table Tennis
- Tennis
- Weightlifting
- Wrestling

== Ceremonies ==
=== Opening ceremony ===
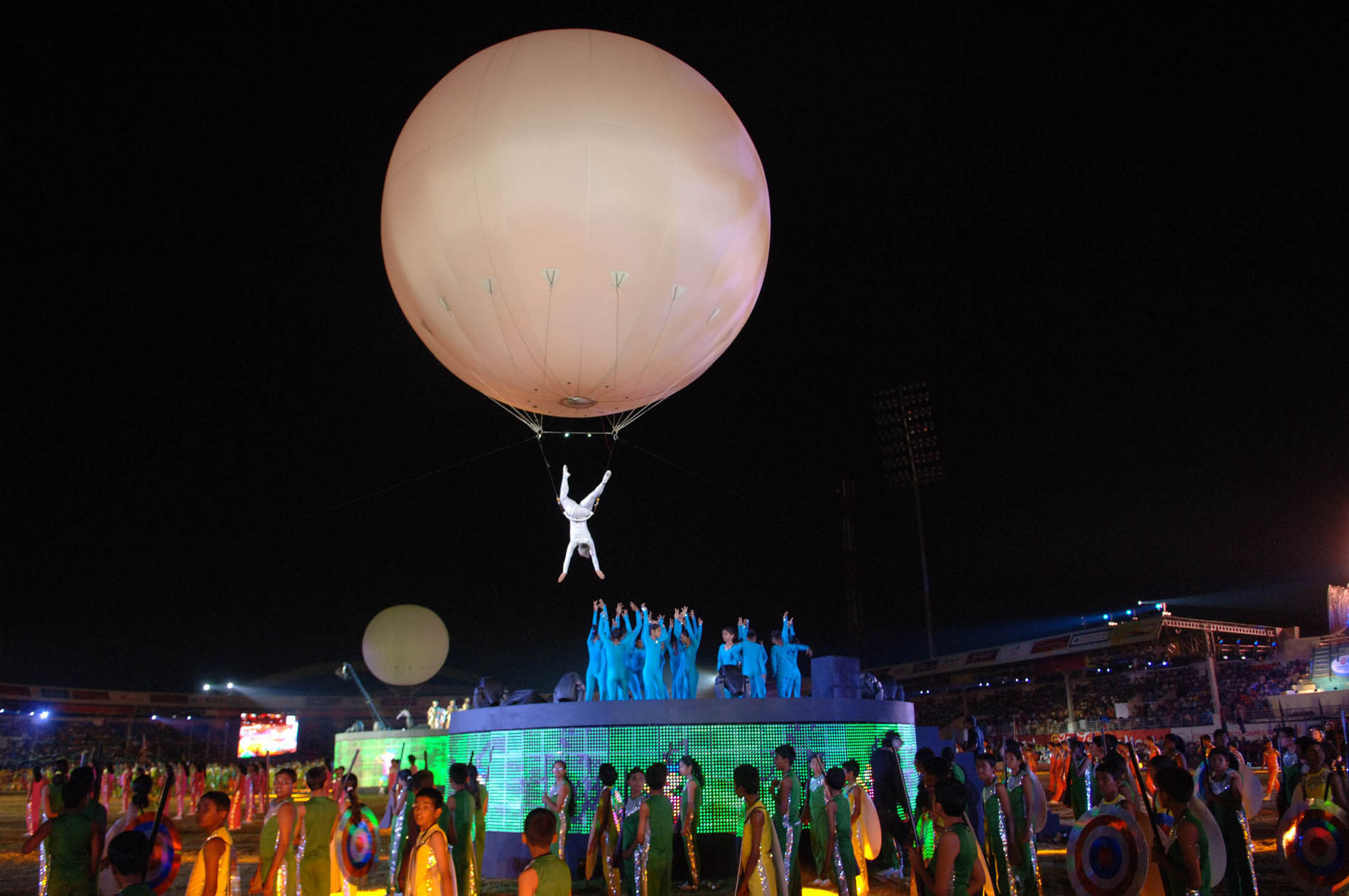
Opening ceremony

The spectacular opening ceremony included several performances showcasing Indian culture and tradition. There was also a unique show set up by the Indian Air Force. Abhinav Bindra, India's gold medal winner at the Beijing 2008 Summer Olympics, was the final Youth Baton Runner, who poured the water collected from different countries into a kalash. The "Fountain of Youth" was later formed from this water. Veteran actress Hema Malini performed a beautiful prayer dance. Bollywood actor Saif Ali Khan also performed during the event. Singers Sunidhi Chauhan and Shankar Mahadevan sang the theme song. There was also a performance by the Indian actress Urmila Matondkar. The president of India, Pratibha Patil, declared the Games open. The entire event was choreographed by Shiamak Davar. Various schools from Pune participated in the event.

=== Closing ceremony ===
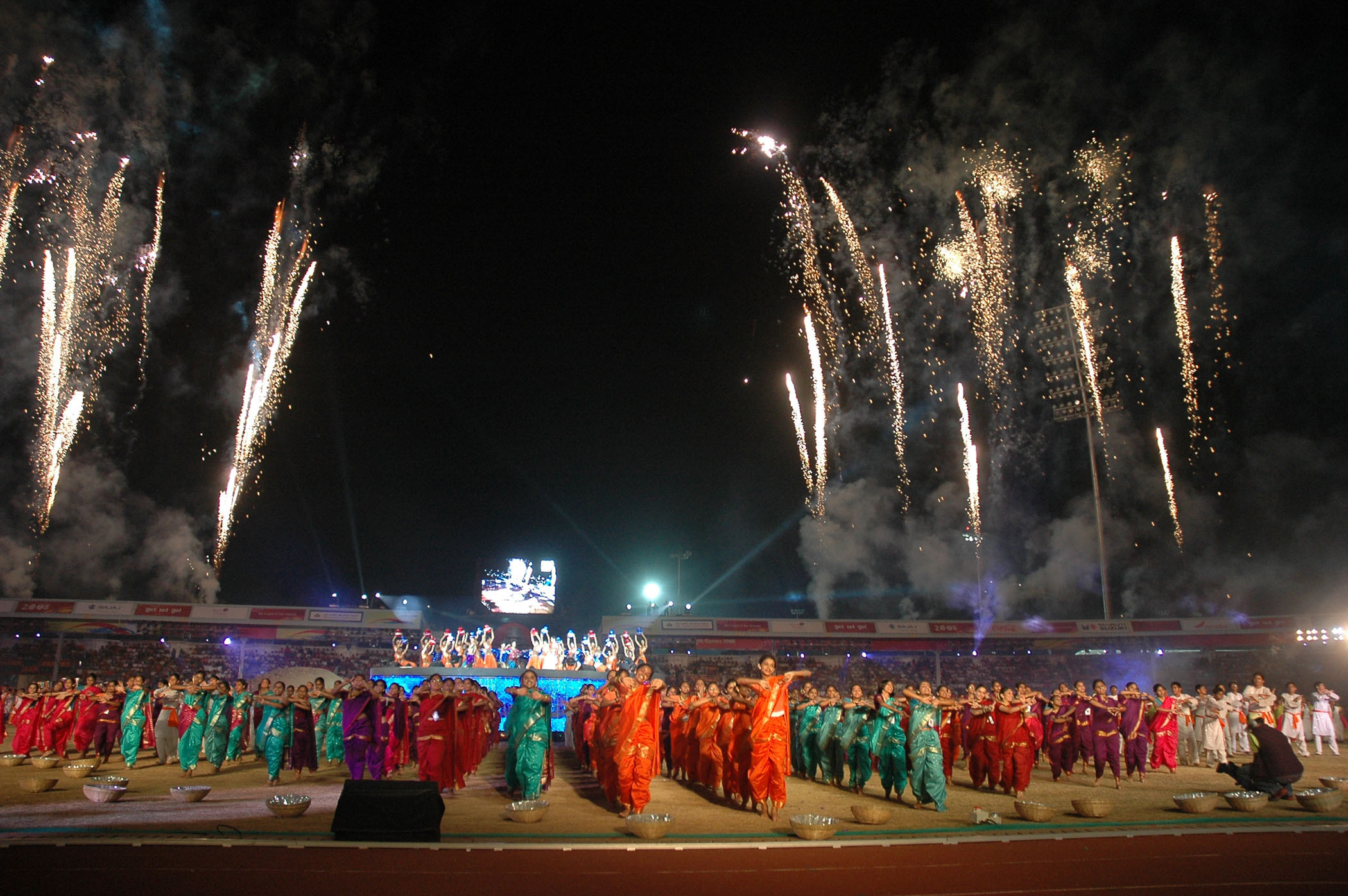
Closing ceremony

The closing ceremony of the 2008 Commonwealth Youth Games included the presence of several dignitaries and Bollywood stars. The ceremonies began with a special dog show organised by the military of India. This was followed by the official ceremony, when the Secretary of the Commonwealth Games Federation declared the Games closed. The cultural part included musical performances by some of the finest singers from India, such as Shaan, Kunal Ganjawala, and Shiamak Davar, the choreographer of the event. A few select schools were selected to perform in the closing ceremony, like Kamalnayan Bajaj and St. Ursula's. These dances were also choreographed by Shiamak Davar's group. Various indigenous cultures from Northern, Southern, Eastern, and Western India were shown by Diya Mirza, Neha Dhupia, and Malaika Arora. Bollywood actor Ritesh Deshmukh also performed with them during the event. Bollywood actress Shilpa Shetty also performed during the event. The "Fountain of Youth" which was created during the opening ceremony was slowly lowered and a "Garden of Youth" was formed. The "Garden of Youth" will remain outside the stadium as a part of the legacy. The hand over ceremony included a seven-minute show from the Isle of Man, who will host the games in 2011. The official mascot of the 2008 Games, Jiggr said good bye to the competitors of the youth Games, after which the mascot for the Delhi 2010 Games, Shera, welcomed all to Delhi. The closing ceremonies were ended with fireworks.

== Marketing ==
Jigrr, Official mascot of the 2008 Commonwealth Youth Games

=== Logo ===
The logo of the Games reflect the heritage of Pune and Maharashtra. The seal features the city's name 'Pune' in both English script and Devanagari/Sanskrit script. The seal itself is derived from the Maratha seal of the Maratha king, Shivaji. It is a fusion of the traditional Pune culture and modernity.

=== Mascot ===
The name of the official mascot of the 2008 Commonwealth Youth Games is "Jigrr". The mascot is a tiger, the national animal of India. Jigrr is the younger brother of 'Shera', the mascot of 2010 Commonwealth Games. Jigrr the name, is an amalgam of the word 'Jigar', which implies courage in Hindi language and also the sound of tiger roar 'grrr...'

== Youth Baton Relay ==
For the Youth Games 2008, a new concept called the "Youth Baton Relay" (based on the Queen's Baton Relay) has been created by the organizers. For the event, a baton will be carried through nine Indian states, carrying water from around the country.

The Youth Baton Relay will begin at New Delhi University North Campus and proceed to India Gate on 1 August 2008, at a large cultural festival. The Baton will then travel through nine states, and cover over 8000 km. Six thousand athletes have been selected to carry the Baton; an additional 7500 volunteers will help the Baton through 199 cities, towns and villages. Additionally, approximately 80 crew, 25 vehicles and guests, media and VIP's will escort the baton on its trip.

In keeping with the "green games" theme for both the 2008 Youth Games and the 2010 Commonwealth Games, the relay will be in support of the 'save the tiger' campaign. The collected water is to symbolise the conservation of natural resources, and will be used at the opening ceremony to create a "fountain of Youth". A "garden of youth" will also be created by the 71 participating nations at Balewadi Stadium.

== Participating nations ==
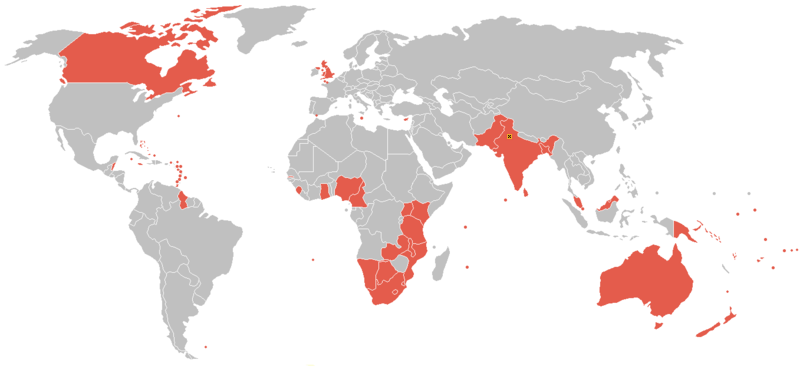
Nations expected to compete at the Games

A total of 71 nations sent teams to the 2008 Youth Games. Some of the major teams include Australia fielding 102 athletes , England with 80 , Canada fielding 59 & Scotland with 44 . Some of the other major teams include South Africa, the hosts India, Malaysia and Singapore.

In alphabetical order, the list of participating nations is as follows:

- Anguilla
- Antigua and Barbuda
- Australia
- Bahamas
- Bangladesh
- Barbados
- Belize
- Bermuda
- Botswana
- British Virgin Islands
- Brunei
- Cameroon
- Canada
- Cayman Islands
- Cook Islands
- Cyprus
- Dominica
- England
- Falkland Islands
- Fiji
- Gambia
- Ghana
- Gibraltar
- Grenada
- Guernsey
- Guyana
- India
- Isle of Man
- Jamaica
- Jersey
- Kenya
- Kiribati
- Lesotho
- Malawi
- Malaysia
- Maldives
- Malta
- Mauritius
- Montserrat
- Mozambique
- Namibia
- Nauru
- New Zealand
- Nigeria
- Niue
- Norfolk Island
- Northern Ireland
- Pakistan
- Papua New Guinea
- Saint Helena
- Saint Kitts and Nevis
- Saint Lucia
- Saint Vincent and the Grenadines
- Samoa
- Scotland
- Seychelles
- Sierra Leone
- Singapore
- Solomon Islands
- South Africa
- Sri Lanka
- Swaziland
- Tanzania
- Tonga
- Trinidad and Tobago
- Turks and Caicos Islands
- Tuvalu
- Uganda
- Vanuatu
- Wales
- Zambia

== Medal table ==
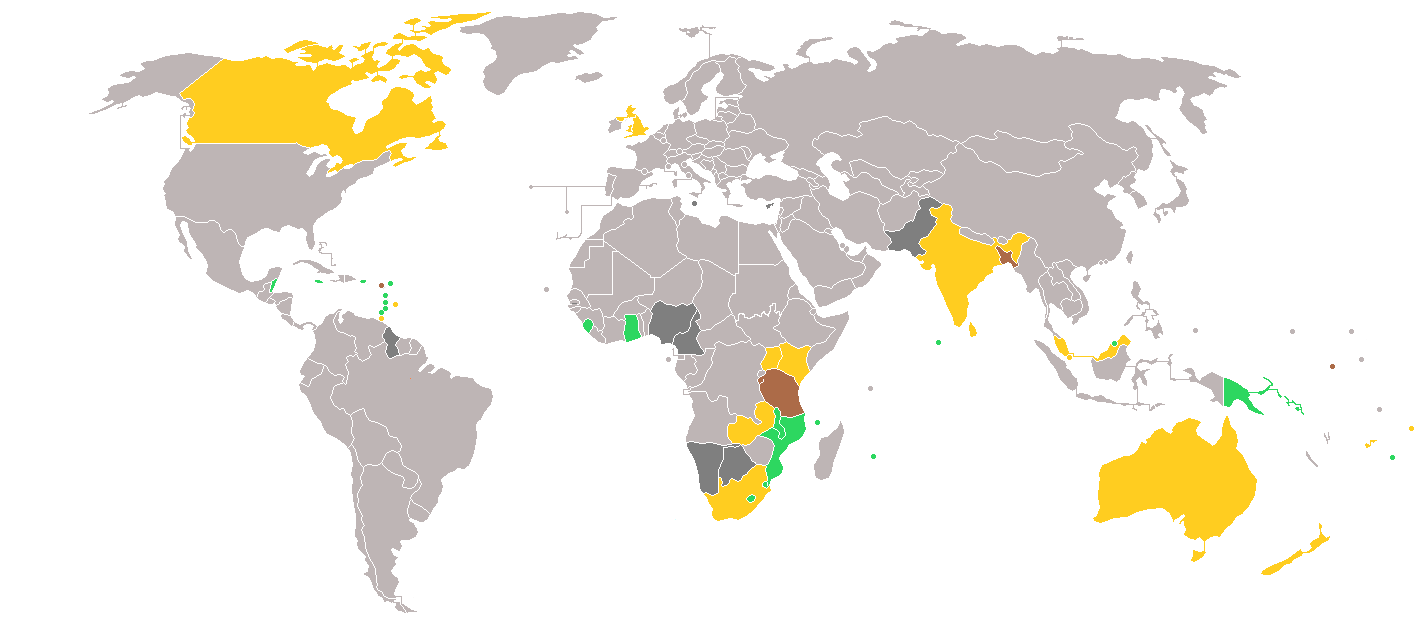
Medal Map

This is the partial table of the medal count of the Commonwealth Youth Games. These rankings sort by the number of gold medals earned by a country. The number of silvers is taken into consideration next and then the number of bronze. If, after the above, countries are still tied, equal ranking is given and they are listed alphabetically.

* Host nation (India)

Rank	Nation	Gold	Silver	Bronze	Total
1	India (IND)*	33	26	17	76
2	Australia (AUS)	24	18	23	65
3	England (ENG)	18	9	14	41
4	South Africa (SAF)	7	14	9	30
5	Canada (CAN)	6	11	9	26
6	Wales (WAL)	5	5	6	16
7	Malaysia (MAS)	3	4	6	13
8	Scotland (SCO)	3	3	12	18
9	New Zealand (NZL)	3	1	3	7
10	Kenya (KEN)	3	0	3	6
11	Sri Lanka (SRI)	3	0	0	3
12	Singapore (SIN)	2	5	4	11
13	Uganda (UGA)	1	3	1	5
14	Samoa (SAM)	1	1	2	4
15	Zambia (ZAM)	1	1	1	3
16	Fiji (FIJ)	1	1	0	2
17	Barbados (BAR)	1	0	0	1
17	Grenada (GRN)	1	0	0	1
17	Guernsey (GUE)	1	0	0	1
20	Northern Ireland (NIR)	0	4	5	9
21	Pakistan (PAK)	0	2	1	3
22	Nigeria (NGR)	0	1	2	3
23	Botswana (BOT)	0	1	1	2
23	Cameroon (CMR)	0	1	1	2
25	Cyprus (CYP)	0	1	0	1
25	Gambia (GAM)	0	1	0	1
25	Guyana (GUY)	0	1	0	1
25	Malta (MLT)	0	1	0	1
25	Namibia (NAM)	0	1	0	1
30	Bangladesh (BAN)	0	0	1	1
30	Nauru (NRU)	0	0	1	1
30	Saint Kitts and Nevis (SKN)	0	0	1	1
30	Tanzania (TAN)	0	0	1	1
Totals (33 entries)		117	116	124	357

== See also ==
- 2030 Commonwealth Games
- 2010 Commonwealth Games
- Commonwealth Youth Games
