= 2021 BWF World Championships qualification =

This is the list of entries of the 2021 BWF World Championships qualification.

== Overview ==
=== Events ===
This event holds men's singles and doubles, women's singles and doubles, and mixed doubles.

=== Number of players/member association quota ===
This event's total limit of eligibility players is 400 players, the following charts are the rules and the distribution.

	Men's singles	Women's singles	Men's doubles	Women's doubles	Mixed doubles	Total
Entry limits	64 players	48 players	96 players (48 pairs)	96 players (48 pairs)	96 players (48 pairs)	400 players

Players/pairs ranked on date eligible	Total number of players/pairs from any one Member Association in that event must not exceed
1 to 8	4
9 to 24	3
25 to 150	2

== Participating players ==
=== Men's singles ===
According to the phase 2 updated by BWF, the following table is the invitation results.

Players who ranked from 1 to 8, whose association could nominate 4 players.
Players who ranked from 9 to 24, whose association could nominate 3 players.
Players who ranked from 25 to 150, whose association could nominate 2 players.

Rank	Nation / Player	Points	Eligibility		Note
1	(Japan) Kento Momota	109,118	1	Japan (1)	BA highest ranked
2	(Denmark) Viktor Axelsen	103,786	2	Denmark (1)	BE highest ranked
3	(Denmark) Anders Antonsen	94,875	3	Denmark (2)	
4	(Chinese Taipei) Chou Tien-chen	89,828	4	Chinese Taipei (1)	
5	(Indonesia) Anthony Sinisuka Ginting	86,232	5	Indonesia (1)	
6	(China) Chen Long	84,400		~~China~~	Decline participation
7	(Indonesia) Jonatan Christie	74,770	6	Indonesia (2)	
8	(Malaysia) Lee Zii Jia	69,689	7	Malaysia (1)	
9	(Hong Kong) Ng Ka Long	69,270	8	Hong Kong (1)	
10	(China) Shi Yuqi	64,941		~~China~~	Decline participation (on 5 November)
11	(Chinese Taipei) Wang Tzu-wei	63,793	9	Chinese Taipei (2)	
12	(Denmark) Rasmus Gemke	61,070	10	Denmark (3)	
13	(Japan) Kanta Tsuneyama	59,285	11	Japan (2)	
14	(India) Srikanth Kidambi	56,499	12	India (1)	
15	(India) B. Sai Praneeth	56,467	13	India (2)	
16	(Japan) Kenta Nishimoto	54,233	14	Japan (3)	
17	(Hong Kong) Lee Cheuk Yiu	53,961	15	Hong Kong (2)	
18	(Thailand) Kantaphon Wangcharoen	53,571	16	Thailand (1)	
19	(Indonesia) Shesar Hiren Rhustavito	50,630	17	Indonesia (3)	
20	(Denmark) Hans-Kristian Vittinghus	50,108	56	Denmark (4)	Reserve 1
21	(China) Lin Dan	47,670		~~China~~	Retired
22	(Denmark) Jan Ø. Jørgensen	47,664		Denmark	Reserve 2, Retired
23	(Netherlands) Mark Caljouw	46,819	18	Netherlands (1)	
24	(India) Lakshya Sen	46,597	19	India (3)	
25	(Thailand) Kunlavut Vitidsarn	46,348	20	Thailand (2)	
26	(Thailand) Sitthikom Thammasin	46,257	57	Thailand (3)	Reserve 3
27	(China) Lu Guangzu	45,869	21	China (1)	
28	(India) Sameer Verma	45,319		~~India~~	Reserve 4, Decline participation
29	(China) Huang Yuxiang	45,000		~~China~~	Reserve 5, Decline participation
30	(India) Prannoy Kumar	43,535	58	India (4)	Reserve 6
31	(India) Parupalli Kashyap	43,440		India	Reserve 7
32	(Indonesia) Tommy Sugiarto	42,400	59	Indonesia (4)	Reserve 8
33	(France) Toma Junior Popov	40,958	22	France (1)	
34	(South Korea) Heo Kwang-hee	40,257	23	South Korea (1)	
35	(Malaysia) Liew Daren	40,250	24	Malaysia (2)	
36	(India) Sourabh Verma	40,169		India	Reserve 9
37	(France) Brice Leverdez	40,004	25	France (2)	
38	(Thailand) Khosit Phetpradab	39,793		~~Thailand~~	Reserve 10, Decline participation
39	(China) Zhao Junpeng	37,395	60	China (2)	Reserve 11
40	(Singapore) Loh Kean Yew	37,224	26	Singapore (1)	
41	(France) Thomas Rouxel	37,137	61	France (3)	Reserve 12, Invited
42	(Japan) Koki Watanabe	37,126	62	Japan (4)	Reserve 13
43	(Canada) Brian Yang	36,688	27	Canada (1)	BPA highest ranked
44	(Thailand) Tanongsak Saensomboonsuk	36,460		~~Thailand~~	Reserve 14, Decline participation
45	(Guatemala) Kevin Cordón	36,302	28	Guatemala (1)	
46	(Canada) Jason Ho-Shue	34,990	29	Canada (2)	
47	(Israel) Misha Zilberman	34,314	30	Israel (1)	
48	(Hong Kong) Wong Wing Ki	34,050		~~Hong Kong~~	Reserve 15, Decline participation
49	(China) Sun Feixiang	33,690		~~China~~	Reserve 16, Decline participation
50	(Brazil) Ygor Coelho	33,509	31	Brazil (1)	
51	(England) Toby Penty	33,289	32	England (1)	
52	(Spain) Pablo Abián	33,230	33	Spain (1)	Host nation presenter
53	(Japan) Kodai Naraoka	32,787		Japan	Reserve 17
54	(Thailand) Suppanyu Avihingsanon	32,486		Thailand	Reserve 18, Decline participation
55	(Republic of Ireland) Nhat Nguyen	32,460	34	Ireland (1)	
56	(India) Subhankar Dey	31,995		India	Reserve 19
57	(Sweden) Felix Burestedt	31,411	35	Sweden (1)	
58	(South Korea) Lee Dong-keun	30,835		~~South Korea~~	Decline participation
59	(Germany) Max Weißkirchen	30,043	36	Germany (1)	
60	(Vietnam) Nguyễn Tiến Minh	28,955	37	Vietnam (1)	
61	(India) Ajay Jayaram	28,810		India	Reserve 20
62	(Denmark) Victor Svendsen	28,660		Denmark	Reserve 21
63	(Spain) Luís Enrique Peñalver	28,660	38	Spain (2)	Host nation presenter
64	(Indonesia) Chico Aura Dwi Wardoyo	27,370		Indonesia	
65	(China) Li Shifeng	27,340	63	China (3)	Reserve 22
66	(Canada) Xiaodong Sheng	27,050		Canada	Reserve 23
67	(Finland) Kalle Koljonen	26,822	39	Finland (1)	
68	(South Korea) Son Wan-ho	26,635		~~South Korea~~	Decline participation
69	(Mexico) Lino Muñoz	26,339	40	Mexico (1)	
70	(Malaysia) Cheam June Wei	26,190	64	Malaysia (3)	Reserve 24
71	(France) Christo Popov	25,347		France	Reserve 25
72	(Denmark) Mads Christophersen	25,150		Denmark	
73	(Russia) Sergey Sirant	24,984	41	Russia (1)	
74	(Malaysia) Soong Joo Ven	24,757		Malaysia	
75	(Azerbaijan) Ade Resky Dwicahyo	24,726	42	Azerbaijan (1)	
76	(Germany) Kai Schäfer	24,680	43	Germany (2)	
77	(Chinese Taipei) Lin Yu-hsien	24,460		Chinese Taipei	
78	(France) Lucas Claerbout	23,974		France	
79	(France) Lucas Corvée	23,890		France	
80	(Chinese Taipei) Lin Chun-yi	23,600		Chinese Taipei	
81	(Canada) B. R. Sankeerth	23,370		Canada	
82	(Russia) Vladimir Malkov	22,695	44	Russia (2)	
83	(Denmark) Ditlev Jæger Holm	22,590		Denmark	
84	(Mauritius) Georges Paul	21,459		~~Mauritius~~	BCA highest ranked, Decline participation
85	(Netherlands) Joran Kweekel	21,368	45	Netherlands (2)	
86	(Finland) Eetu Heino	21,110		~~Finland~~	Decline participation
87	(Austria) Luka Wraber	21,018	46	Austria (1)	
88	(United States) Timothy Lam	20,869	47	United States (1)	
89	(Malaysia) Iskandar Zulkarnain Zainuddin	20,660		Malaysia	
90	(Denmark) Kim Bruun	20,630		Denmark	
91	(Malaysia) Ng Tze Yong	20,600		Malaysia	
92	(France) Arnaud Merklé	20,595		France	
93	(Estonia) Raul Must	20,543		~~Estonia~~	Decline participation (on 20 October)
94	(New Zealand) Abhinav Manota	20,507		~~New Zealand~~	BO highest ranked, Decline participation
95	(Hungary) Gergely Krausz	20,220		~~Hungary~~	Decline participation
96	(Belgium) Maxime Moreels	19,826	48	Belgium (1)	
97	(India) Chirag Sen	19,820		India	
98	(Chinese Taipei) Lu Chia-hung	19,760		Chinese Taipei	
99	(Ukraine) Artem Pochtarov	19,625		~~Ukraine~~	Decline participation
100	(Cuba) Osleni Guerrero	19,150		~~Cuba~~	Decline participation
101	(India) Kiran George	19,030		India	
102	(Indonesia) Ihsan Maulana Mustofa	18,998		Indonesia	
103	(Japan) Kazumasa Sakai	18,960		Japan	
104	(Malaysia) Soo Teck Zhi	18,940		Malaysia	
105	(Mexico) Luis Montoya	18,874	49	Mexico (2)	
106	(Indonesia) Ikhsan Rumbay	18,590		Indonesia	
107	(India) Siril Verma	18,470		India	
108	(Japan) Hashiru Shimono	18,340		Japan	
109	(United States) Howard Shu	18,285	50	United States (2)	
110	(Turkey) Emre Lale	18,114	51	Turkey (1)	
111	(China) Ren Pengbo	17,970		China	
112	(Japan) Yu Igarashi	17,820		Japan	
113	(Japan) Minoru Koga	17,774		Japan	
114	(Japan) Takuma Obayashi	17,700		Japan	
115	(South Korea) Kim Dong-hyun	17,370		South Korea	
116	(Sri Lanka) Niluka Karunaratne	17,270	52	Sri Lanka (1)	
117	(Mexico) Job Castillo	17,207		Mexico	
118	(Poland) Michał Rogalski	17,031	53	Poland (1)	
119	(Japan) Yusuke Onodera	16,940		Japan	
120	(Nigeria) Anuoluwapo Juwon Opeyori	16,587	54	Nigeria (1)	
121	(Malaysia) Leong Jun Hao	16,024		Malaysia	
122	(Malaysia) Aidil Sholeh	15,980		Malaysia	
123	(Chinese Taipei) Lee Chia-hao	15,690		Chinese Taipei	
124	(Malaysia) Tan Jia Wei	15,580		Malaysia	
125	(India) Mithun Manjunath	15,540		India	
126	(India) Alap Mishra	15,320		India	
127	(England) Alex Lane	15,128		~~England~~	Decline participation
128	(Vietnam) Phạm Cao Cường	15,128		~~Vietnam~~	Decline participation
129	(India) Siddharth Pratap Singh	15,050		India	
130	(Switzerland) Christian Kirchmayr	14,824		~~Switzerland~~	Decline participation
131	(Portugal) Bernardo Atilano	14,644	55	Portugal (1)	
150+
180	(Australia) Anthony Joe	10,414		~~Australia~~	Oceania continental place, Decline participation

=== Women's singles ===
According to the phase 2 updated by BWF, the following table is the invitation results.

Players who ranked from 1 to 8, whose association could nominate 4 players.
Players who ranked from 9 to 24, whose association could nominate 3 players.
Players who ranked from 25 to 150, whose association could nominate 2 players.

Rank	Nation / Player	Points	Eligibility		Note
1	(Chinese Taipei) Tai Tzu-ying	107,875	1	Chinese Taipei (1)	BA highest ranked
2	(China) Chen Yufei	101,065		~~China~~	Decline participation
3	(Japan) Nozomi Okuhara	95,886	2	Japan (1)	
4	(Spain) Carolina Marín	95,800	3	Spain (1)	BE highest ranked, Host nation presenter
5	(Japan) Akane Yamaguchi	88,000	4	Japan (2)	
6	(Thailand) Ratchanok Intanon	82,685	5	Thailand (1)	
7	(India) P. V. Sindhu	82,434	6	India (1)	
8	(South Korea) An Se-young	76,178	7	South Korea (1)	
9	(China) He Bingjiao	72,740	8	China (1)	
10	(Thailand) Pornpawee Chochuwong	68,456	9	Thailand (2)	
11	(Canada) Michelle Li	67,550	10	Canada (1)	BPA highest ranked
12	(Denmark) Mia Blichfeldt	61,295	11	Denmark (1)	
13	(Thailand) Busanan Ongbamrungphan	57,754	12	Thailand (3)	
14	(United States) Beiwen Zhang	57,700		~~United States~~	Decline participation
15	(Japan) Sayaka Takahashi	54,734	13	Japan (3)	
16	(South Korea) Sung Ji-hyun	54,010		~~South Korea~~	Decline participation
17	(South Korea) Kim Ga-eun	51,293	14	South Korea (2)	
18	(China) Wang Zhiyi	50,640	15	China (2)	
19	(India) Saina Nehwal	49,257		~~India~~	Decline participation
20	(Japan) Aya Ohori	48,699	43	Japan (4)	Reserve 1
21	(Indonesia) Gregoria Mariska Tunjung	47,500	16	Indonesia (1)	
22	(Russia) Evgeniya Kosetskaya	47,290	17	Russia (1)	
23	(Germany) Yvonne Li	46,526	18	Germany (1)	
24	(Denmark) Line Christophersen	45,275	19	Denmark (2)	
25	(Thailand) Nitchaon Jindapol	44,677		~~Thailand~~	Reserve 2, Decline participation
26	(Scotland) Kirsty Gilmour	44,469	20	Scotland (1)	
27	(China) Han Yue	44,406	44	China (3)	Reserve 3
28	(China) Cai Yanyan	43,193		China	Reserve 4
29	(Turkey) Neslihan Yiğit	42,763	21	Turkey (1)	
30	(Singapore) Yeo Jia Min	42,695	22	Singapore (1)	
31	(Thailand) Phittayaporn Chaiwan	41,752	45	Thailand (4)	Reserve 5
32	(Hong Kong) Cheung Ngan Yi	39,310	23	Hong Kong (1)	
33	(Thailand) Supanida Katethong	39,230		Thailand	Reserve 6
34	(Malaysia) Soniia Cheah Su Ya	39,131		~~Malaysia~~	Decline participation
35	(Denmark) Line Kjærsfeldt	39,120	46	Denmark (3)	Reserve 7
36	(United States) Iris Wang	38,580	24	United States (1)	
37	(China) Chen Xiaoxin	38,320		China	Reserve 8
38	(Belgium) Lianne Tan	37,296	25	Belgium (1)	
39	(Denmark) Julie Dawall Jakobsen	35,536	47	Denmark (4)	Reserve 9
40	(Indonesia) Fitriani	35,274		~~Indonesia~~	Decline participation
41	(France) Qi Xuefei	34,860	26	France (1)	
42	(Indonesia) Ruselli Hartawan	34,720	27	Indonesia (2)	
43	(Chinese Taipei) Pai Yu-po	34,051	28	Chinese Taipei (2)	
44	(China) Zhang Yiman	33,830	48	China (4)	Reserve 10
45	(Thailand) Porntip Buranaprasertsuk	33,830		Thailand	Reserve 11
46	(Vietnam) Nguyễn Thùy Linh	31,506	29	Vietnam (1)	
47	(Switzerland) Sabrina Jaquet	30,769		~~Switzerland~~	Decline participation
48	(South Korea) Kim Hyo-min	30,490		South Korea	Reserve 12
49	(Canada) Brittney Tam	30,418		~~Canada~~	Decline participation
50	(Japan) Saena Kawakami	30,380		Japan	Reserve 13
51	(Estonia) Kristin Kuuba	30,159	30	Estonia (1)	
52	(Vietnam) Vũ Thị Trang	28,555	31	Vietnam (2)	
53	(Malaysia) Kisona Selvaduray	27,664	32	Malaysia (1)	
54	(Bulgaria) Linda Zetchiri	27,412		~~Bulgaria~~	Reserve 14, Decline participation
55	(South Korea) Sim Yu-jin	27,396		South Korea	Reserve 15
56	(Germany) Fabienne Deprez	26,922		~~Germany~~	Decline participation
57	(Hong Kong) Yip Pui Yin	26,550	33	Hong Kong (2)	
58	(Spain) Clara Azurmendi	26,309	34	Spain (2)	Host nation presenter
59	(Israel) Ksenia Polikarpova	26,197	35	Israel (1)	
60	(France) Marie Batomene	26,006	36	France (2)	
61	(Japan) Natsuki Nidaira	25,720		Japan	Reserve 16
62	(United States) Crystal Pan	25,280		~~United States~~	Decline participation
63	(Turkey) Aliye Demirbağ	25,070	37	Turkey (2)	
64	(Poland) Jordan Hart	25,280		~~Poland~~	Not eligible
65	(Russia) Natalia Perminova	24,692	38	Russia (2)	
66	(Slovakia) Martina Repiská	24,692	39	Slovakia (1)	
67	(Myanmar) Thet Htar Thuzar	24,200	40	Myanmar (1)	
68	(Netherlands) Soraya de Visch Eijbergen	23,596	41	Netherlands (1)	
69	(Australia) Chen Hsuan-yu	23,586	42	Australia (1)	BO highest ranked
70	(Thailand) Benyapa Aimsaard	23,480		Thailand	Reserve 17
71	(Spain) Beatriz Corrales	23,183		Spain	Reserve 18
72	(Brazil) Fabiana Silva	23,130		~~Brazil~~	Decline participation
73	(Chinese Taipei) Sung Shuo-yun	22,720		Chinese Taipei	Reserve 19
74	(Bulgaria) Mariya Mitsova	22,608		Bulgaria	Reserve 20
75	(France) Léonice Huet	22,580		France	Reserve 21
76	(France) Yaëlle Hoyaux	22,020		France	Reserve 22
77	(Hungary) Laura Sárosi	21,981		Hungary	Reserve 23
78	(China) Ji Shuting	21,860		China	Reserve 24
79	(England) Chloe Birch	21,758		England	Reserve 25
80	(Denmark) Irina Amalie Andersen	21,530		Denmark	Reserve 26
81	(Hong Kong) Deng Xuan	21,360		Hong Kong	Reserve 27
82	(Ukraine) Marija Ultina	21,031		Ukraine	Reserve 28
83	(Chinese Taipei) Chiang Ying-li	20,930		Chinese Taipei	Reserve 29
84	(Finland) Airi Mikkelä	20,729		Finland	Reserve 30
85	(Turkey) Özge Bayrak	20,522		Turkey	
86	(Japan) Ayumi Mine	20,450		Japan	
87	(Egypt) Hadia Hosny	20,331		~~Egypt~~	BCA highest ranked, Decline participation

=== Men's doubles ===
According to the phase 2 updated by BWF, the following table is the invitation results.

Players who ranked from 1 to 8, whose association could nominate 4 players.
Players who ranked from 9 to 24, whose association could nominate 3 players.
Players who ranked from 25 to 150, whose association could nominate 2 players.

Rank	Nation / Player	Points	Eligibility		Note
1	(Indonesia) Marcus Fernaldi Gideon (Indonesia) Kevin Sanjaya Sukamuljo	106,853	1	Indonesia (1)	BA highest ranked
2	(Indonesia) Hendra Setiawan (Indonesia) Mohammad Ahsan	101,957	2	Indonesia (2)	
3	(Chinese Taipei) Lee Yang (Chinese Taipei) Wang Chi-lin	94,973	3	Chinese Taipei (1)	
4	(China) Li Junhui (China) Liu Yuchen	87,330		~~China~~	Decline participation (on 5 November)
5	(Japan) Hiroyuki Endo (Japan) Yuta Watanabe	84,863		~~Japan~~	Hiroyuki Endo has retired Decline participation
6	(Japan) Takeshi Kamura (Japan) Keigo Sonoda	84,503		~~Japan~~	Both players retired Decline participation
7	(Indonesia) Fajar Alfian (Indonesia) Muhammad Rian Ardianto	72,894	4	Indonesia (3)	
8	(Malaysia) Aaron Chia (Malaysia) Soh Wooi Yik	70,428	5	Malaysia (1)	
9	(South Korea) Choi Sol-gyu (South Korea) Seo Seung-jae	67,260		~~South Korea~~	Decline participation (on 17 November)
10	(India) Satwiksairaj Rankireddy (India) Chirag Shetty	65,200	6	India (1)	
11	(Denmark) Kim Astrup (Denmark) Anders Skaarup Rasmussen	64,809	7	Denmark (1)	BE highest ranked
12	(England) Marcus Ellis (England) Chris Langridge	63,304		~~England~~	Decline participation
13	(Malaysia) Goh V Shem (Malaysia) Tan Wee Kiong	61,430	8	Malaysia (2)	
14	(Russia) Vladimir Ivanov (Russia) Ivan Sozonov	60,253	9	Russia (1)	
15	(Malaysia) Ong Yew Sin (Malaysia) Teo Ee Yi	58,209	10	Malaysia (3)	
16	(Japan) Takuro Hoki (Japan) Yugo Kobayashi	57,188	11	Japan (1)	
17	(Germany) Mark Lamsfuß (Germany) Marvin Seidel	54,191	12	Germany (1)	
18	(China) Han Chengkai (China) Zhou Haodong	54,107		~~China~~	Han Chengkai has retired Decline participation
19	(England) Ben Lane (England) Sean Vendy	53,986	13	England (1)	
20	(Chinese Taipei) Liao Min-chun (Chinese Taipei) Su Ching-heng	49,026		~~Chinese Taipei~~	Decline participation
21	(China) He Jiting (China) Tan Qiang	48,860	14	China (1)	
22	(China) Huang Kaixiang (China) Liu Cheng	48,520	15	China (2)	
23	(Chinese Taipei) Lu Ching-yao (Chinese Taipei) Yang Po-han	47,913	16	Chinese Taipei (2)	
24	(Denmark) Mathias Boe (Denmark) Mads Conrad-Petersen	47,629		~~Denmark~~	Decline participation
25	(China) Ou Xuanyi (China) Zhang Nan	46,520	39	China (3)	Reserve 1
26	(South Korea) Ko Sung-hyun (South Korea) Shin Baek-cheol	45,500		~~South Korea~~	Decline participation
27	(Malaysia) Goh Sze Fei (Malaysia) Nur Izzuddin	44,032	40	Malaysia (4)	Reserve 2
28	(Japan) Akira Koga (Japan) Taichi Saito	41,608	17	Japan (2)	
29	(Indonesia) Wahyu Nayaka (Indonesia) Ade Yusuf Santoso	40,680		~~Indonesia~~	Decline participation
30	(Chinese Taipei) Lee Jhe-huei (Chinese Taipei) Yang Po-hsuan	40,650	41	Chinese Taipei (3)	Reserve 3
31	(Japan) Takuto Inoue (Japan) Yuki Kaneko	40,317		~~Japan~~	Reserve 4 Decline participation
32	(Canada) Jason Ho-Shue (Canada) Nyl Yakura	40,038		~~Canada~~	BPA highest ranked Decline participation
33	(South Korea) Kim Gi-jung (South Korea) Lee Yong-dae	39,320		~~South Korea~~	Decline participation
34	(Germany) Jones Ralfy Jansen (Germany) Peter Käsbauer	38,788		~~Germany~~	Decline participation
35	(United States) Phillip Chew (United States) Ryan Chew	38,648		~~United States~~	Decline participation
36	(India) Manu Attri (India) B. Sumeeth Reddy	36,969	18	India (2)	
37	(Scotland) Alexander Dunn (Scotland) Adam Hall	36,430	19	Scotland	
38	(Indonesia) Leo Rolly Carnando (Indonesia) Daniel Marthin	36,380	42	Indonesia (4)	Reserve 5
39	(France) Christo Popov (France) Toma Junior Popov	35,290	20	France (1)	
40	(China) Di Zijian (China) Wang Chang	34,860	43	China (4)	Reserve 6
41	(Netherlands) Jelle Maas (Netherlands) Robin Tabeling	33,773		~~Netherlands~~	
42	(Indonesia) Muhammad Shohibul Fikri (Indonesia) Bagas Maulana	33,540		Indonesia	Reserve 7
43	(South Korea) Kang Min-hyuk (South Korea) Kim Jae-hwan	32,400		~~South Korea~~	Reserve 8 Decline participation
44	(Indonesia) Pramudya Kusumawardana (Indonesia) Yeremia Rambitan	30,990		Indonesia	Reserve 9
45	(Thailand) Bodin Isara (Thailand) Maneepong Jongjit	30,607		~~Thailand~~	Decline participation (on 10 November)
46	(Japan) Keiichiro Matsui (Japan) Yoshinori Takeuchi	29,430	44	Japan (3)	Reserve 10
47	(India) Arjun M.R. (India) Dhruv Kapila	28,838	45	India (3)	Reserve 11
48	(Malaysia) Mohamad Arif Abdul Latif (Malaysia) Nur Mohd Azriyn Ayub	28,510		Malaysia	Reserve 12
49	(Nigeria) Godwin Olofua (Nigeria) Anuoluwapo Juwon Opeyori	28,463	21	Nigeria (1)	BCA highest ranked
50	(Indonesia) Angga Pratama (Indonesia) Ricky Karanda Suwardi	28,310		Indonesia	Reserve 13
51	(India) Arjun M.R. (India) Ramchandran Shlok	27,364		India	Reserve 14; Decline participation
52	(South Korea) Na Sung-seung (South Korea) Wang Chan	27,242		~~South Korea~~	Reserve 15; Decline participation
53	(Denmark) Daniel Lundgaard (Denmark) Mathias Thyrri	27,220	22	Denmark (2)	
54	(South Korea) Kim Won-ho (South Korea) Park Kyung-hoon	26,710		~~South Korea~~	Reserve 16; Decline participation
55	(Thailand) Nipitphon Phuangphuapet (Thailand) Tanupat Viriyangkura	26,598		~~Thailand~~	Decline participation
56	(Denmark) Joel Eipe (Denmark) Rasmus Kjær	26,130	46	Denmark (3)	Reserve 17
57	(Netherlands) Ruben Jille (Netherlands) Ties van der Lecq	26,082	23	Netherlands (1)	
58	(Japan) Hiroki Okamura (Japan) Masayuki Onodera	24,750	47	Japan (4)	Reserve 18
59	(France) Eloi Adam (France) Julien Maio	24,570		~~France~~	Decline participation
60	(Germany) Bjarne Geiss (Germany) Jan Colin Völker	24,359	24	Germany (2)	
61	(Denmark) Mathias Bay-Smidt (Denmark) Lasse Mølhede	24,310		Denmark	Reserve 19
62	(Japan) Mahiro Kaneko (Japan) Yunosuke Kubota	23,910		Japan	Reserve 20
63	(Algeria) Koceila Mammeri (Algeria) Youcef Sabri Medel	23,479	25	Algeria (1)	
64	(Republic of Ireland) Joshua Magee (Republic of Ireland) Paul Reynolds	23,271	26	Ireland (1)	
65	(Malaysia) Chooi Kah Ming (Malaysia) Low Juan Shen	23,120		Malaysia	
66	(New Zealand) Oliver Leydon-Davis (New Zealand) Abhinav Manota	22,756		~~New Zealand~~	BO highest ranked Decline participation
67	(Denmark) Jeppe Bay (Denmark) Lasse Mølhede	22,700		Denmark	
68	(Indonesia) Berry Angriawan (Indonesia) Hardianto	22,560		Indonesia	
69	(Brazil) Fabricio Farias (Brazil) Francielton Farias	22,442	27	Brazil (1)	
70	(Scotland) Christopher Grimley (Scotland) Matthew Grimley	22,330	28	Scotland (2)	
71	(Denmark) Mathias Christiansen (Denmark) Niclas Nøhr	22,260		Denmark	
72	(England) Matthew Clare (England) Max Flynn	21,690		~~England~~	Decline participation
73	(Chinese Taipei) Lin Chia-yu (Chinese Taipei) Yang Ming-tse	21,590		Chinese Taipei	
74	(Malaysia) Low Hang Yee (Malaysia) Ng Eng Cheong	20,725		Malaysia	
75	(South Korea) Kim Duk-young (South Korea) Kim Sa-rang	20,670		South Korea	
76	(Hong Kong) Chang Tak Ching (Hong Kong) Yeung Ming Nok	20,405	29	Hong Kong (1)	
77	(Malaysia) Shia Chun Kang (Malaysia) Tan Boon Heong	19,770		Malaysia	
78	(Austria) Philip Birker (Austria) Dominik Stipsits	19,566	30	Austria (1)	
79	(Australia) Simon Leung (Australia) Mitchell Wheller	19,421		~~Australia~~	Decline participation
80	(China) Liu Cheng (China) Zhang Nan	19,070		China	
81	(Egypt) Adham Hatem Elgamal (Egypt) Ahmed Salah	19,068		~~Egypt~~	Decline participation
82	(England) Zach Russ (England) Steven Stallwood	19,030		~~England~~	Decline participation
83	(Denmark) Emil Lauritzen (Denmark) Mads Muurholm	18,540		Denmark	
84	(France) Thom Gicquel (France) Ronan Labar	18,169		~~France~~	Decline participation
85	(England) Rory Easton (England) Ethan Van Leeuwen	17,478		~~England~~	Decline participation
86	(Guatemala) Aníbal Marroquín (Guatemala) Jonathan Solís	17,245	31	Guatemala (1)	
87	(Czech Republic) Jaromír Janáček (Czech Republic) Tomáš Švejda	17,220	32	Czech Republic (1)	
88	(Chinese Taipei) Lin Shang-kai (Chinese Taipei) Tseng Min-hao	16,780		Chinese Taipei	
89	(France) Fabien Delrue (France) William Villeger	16,190	33	France (2)	
90	(Japan) Shohei Hoshino (Japan) Yujiro Nishikawa	16,060		Japan	
91	(Denmark) Philip Illum Klindt (Denmark) Mads Thøgersen	15,650		Denmark	
92	(India) Arun George (India) Sanyam Shukla	15,102	48	India (4)	
93	(Norway) Torjus Flaatten (Norway) Vegard Rikheim	15,098	34	Norway (1)	
94	(India) Vasantha Kumar Hanumaiah Ranganatha (India) Ashith Surya	14,940		India	
95	(Netherlands) Jacco Arends (Netherlands) Ruben Jille	14,911		~~Netherlands~~	Jacco Arends has retired Decline participation
96	(England) Callum Hemming (England) Steven Stallwood	14,670	35	England (2)	
97	(Thailand) Chaloempon Charoenkitamorn (Thailand) Kittisak Namdash	14,220		~~Thailand~~	Decline participation
98	(Chinese Taipei) Chiang Chien-wei (Chinese Taipei) Ye Hong-wei	14,050		Chinese Taipei	
99	(Indonesia) Sabar Karyaman Gutama (Indonesia) Frengky Wijaya Putra	13,981		Indonesia	
100	(Germany) Daniel Hess (Germany) Johannes Pistorius	13,980		Germany	
100+
104	(Ukraine) Glib Beketov (Ukraine) Mykhaylo Makhnovskiy	13,610	36	Ukraine (1)	
105	(Singapore) Danny Bawa Chrisnanta (Singapore) Loh Kean Hean	13,580		~~Singapore~~	Decline participation
108	(Canada) Joshua Hurlburt-Yu (Canada) Duncan Yao	13,294		~~Canada~~	Decline participation
109	(Cuba) Osleni Guerrero (Cuba) Leodannis Martínez	13,280		~~Cuba~~	Decline participation
117	(Italy) Giovanni Greco (Italy) Kevin Strobl	12,551	37	Italy (1)	
121	(Spain) Joan Monroy (Spain) Carlos Piris	12,130	38	Spain (1)	Host nation's presenter
228	(New Zealand) Jonathan Curtin (New Zealand) Dylan Soedjasa	5,830		~~New Zealand~~	Oceania continental place, Decline participation

=== Women's doubles ===
According to the phase 2 updated by BWF, the following table is the invitation results.

Players who ranked from 1 to 8, whose association could nominate 4 players.
Players who ranked from 9 to 24, whose association could nominate 3 players.
Players who ranked from 25 to 150, whose association could nominate 2 players.

Rank	Nation / Player	Points	Eligibility		Note
1	(Japan) Yuki Fukushima (Japan) Sayaka Hirota	101,608		~~Japan~~	BA highest ranked Decline participation
2	(China) Chen Qingchen (China) Jia Yifan	99,110	1	China (1)	
3	(Japan) Mayu Matsumoto (Japan) Wakana Nagahara	96,683	2	Japan (1)	
4	(South Korea) Lee So-hee (South Korea) Shin Seung-chan	93,562	3	South Korea (1)	
5	(South Korea) Kim So-yeong (South Korea) Kong Hee-yong	91,736	4	South Korea (2)	
6	(Indonesia) Greysia Polii (Indonesia) Apriyani Rahayu	89,695	5	Indonesia (1)	
7	(China) Du Yue (China) Li Yinhui	78,729		~~China~~	Decline participation
8	(Thailand) Jongkolphan Kititharakul (Thailand) Rawinda Prajongjai	69,657	6	Thailand (1)	
9	(South Korea) Chang Ye-na (South Korea) Kim Hye-rin	62,940		~~South Korea~~	Decline participation
10	(Japan) Nami Matsuyama (Japan) Chiharu Shida	62,321	7	Japan (2)	
11	(Malaysia) Chow Mei Kuan (Malaysia) Lee Meng Yean	60,944		~~Malaysia~~	Chow Mei Kuan has retired Decline participation
12	(Bulgaria) Gabriela Stoeva (Bulgaria) Stefani Stoeva	60,100	8	Bulgaria (1)	BE highest ranked
13	(South Korea) Baek Ha-na (South Korea) Jung Kyung-eun	59,110		~~South Korea~~	Decline participation
14	(England) Chloe Birch (England) Lauren Smith	57,743	9	England (1)	
15	(China) Li Wenmei (China) Zheng Yu	56,340	10	China (2)	
16	(Denmark) Maiken Fruergaard (Denmark) Sara Thygesen	53,812	11	Denmark (1)	
17	(Netherlands) Selena Piek (Netherlands) Cheryl Seinen	52,824		~~Netherlands~~	Decline participation
18	(Malaysia) Vivian Hoo Kah Mun (Malaysia) Yap Cheng Wen	48,502		~~Malaysia~~	Decline participation
19	(Malaysia) Pearly Tan (Malaysia) Thinaah Muralitharan	47,015	12	Malaysia (1)	
20	(Canada) Rachel Honderich (Canada) Kristen Tsai	46,276	13	Canada (1)	BPA highest ranked
21	(China) Liu Xuanxuan (China) Xia Yuting	46,060	34	China (3)	Reserve 1
22	(Japan) Ayako Sakuramoto (Japan) Yukiko Takahata	45,304		~~Japan~~	Decline participation
23	(Indonesia) Della Destiara Haris (Indonesia) Rizki Amelia Pradipta	44,963		~~Indonesia~~	Decline participation
24	(Thailand) Puttita Supajirakul (Thailand) Sapsiree Taerattanachai	44,930	14	Thailand (2)	
25	(France) Émilie Lefel (France) Anne Tran	44,577		~~France~~	Decline participation
26	(Australia) Setyana Mapasa (Australia) Gronya Somerville	44,260		~~Australia~~	BO highest ranked Decline participation
27	(Denmark) Amalie Magelund (Denmark) Freja Ravn	44,250	15	Denmark (2)	
28	(India) Ashwini Ponnappa (India) N. Sikki Reddy	43,909	16	India (1)	
29	(Chinese Taipei) Hsu Ya-ching (Chinese Taipei) Hu Ling-fang	42,377		~~Chinese Taipei~~	Decline participation
30	(Denmark) Alexandra Bøje (Denmark) Mette Poulsen	41,335	35	Denmark (3)	Reserve 2
31	(Germany) Linda Efler (Germany) Isabel Lohau	40,833	17	Germany (1)	
32	(China) Dong Wenjing (China) Feng Xueying	40,380		~~China~~	Reserve 3 Decline participation
33	(Russia) Ekaterina Malkova (Russia) Alina Davletova	38,153	18	Russia (1)	
34	(Indonesia) Siti Fadia Silva Ramadhanti (Indonesia) Ribka Sugiarto	35,780	19	Indonesia (2)	
35	(Thailand) Chayanit Chaladchalam (Thailand) Phataimas Muenwong	34,591		~~Thailand~~	Reserve 4 Decline participation
36	(France) Delphine Delrue (France) Léa Palermo	34,085	20	France (1)	
37	(Egypt) Doha Hany (Egypt) Hadia Hosny	32,353		~~Egypt~~	BCA highest ranked Decline participation
38	(Russia) Anastasiia Akchurina (Russia) Olga Morozova	31,709	21	Russia (2)	
39	(Turkey) Bengisu Erçetin (Turkey) Nazlıcan İnci	30,564	22	Turkey (1)	
40	(Sweden) Emma Karlsson (Sweden) Johanna Magnusson	29,320		~~Sweden~~	Emma Karlsson has retired Decline participation
41	(Chinese Taipei) Chang Ching-hui (Chinese Taipei) Yang Ching-tun	29,224		~~Chinese Taipei~~	Decline participation
42	(Chinese Taipei) Cheng Chi-ya (Chinese Taipei) Lee Chih-chen	29,030		~~Chinese Taipei~~	Decline participation
43	(Denmark) Julie Finne-Ipsen (Denmark) Mai Surrow	29,020		~~Denmark~~	Reserve 5 Decline participation
44	(Estonia) Kati-Kreet Marran (Estonia) Helina Rüütel	27,450	23	Estonia (1)	
45	(India) Meghana Jakkampudi (India) Poorvisha S. Ram	27,220	24	~~India~~	Decline participation
46	(India) Pooja Dandu (India) Sanjana Santosh	26,970	36	India (2)	Reserve 6
47	(Denmark) Christine Busch (Denmark) Amalie Schulz	26,860	37	Denmark (4)	Reserve 7
48	(Thailand) Chasinee Korepap (Thailand) Jhenicha Sudjaipraparat	26,850		~~Thailand~~	Reserve 8 Decline participation
49	(Scotland) Julie MacPherson (Scotland) Ciara Torrance	26,671	25	Scotland (1)	
50	(Hong Kong) Ng Tsz Yau (Hong Kong) Yuen Sin Ying	26,538	26	Hong Kong (1)	
51	(Canada) Catherine Choi (Canada) Josephine Wu	26,490		~~Canada~~	Decline participation
52	(Indonesia) Nita Violina Marwah (Indonesia) Putri Syaikah	26,060		~~Indonesia~~	Reserve 9 Decline participation
53	(France) Vimala Hériau (France) Margot Lambert	26,038		~~France~~	Decline participation
54	(Brazil) Jaqueline Lima (Brazil) Sâmia Lima	25,577	27	Brazil (1)	
55	(Japan) Shiho Tanaka (Japan) Koharu Yonemoto	25,540		~~Japan~~	Reserve 10; Decline participation
56	(Hong Kong) Ng Wing Yung (Hong Kong) Yeung Nga Ting	25,510	28	Hong Kong (2)	
57	(England) Jenny Moore (England) Victoria Williams	24,911		~~England~~	Decline participation
58	(Sweden) Clara Nistad (Sweden) Moa Sjöö	24,160		~~Sweden~~	Decline participation
59	(Indonesia) Yulfira Barkah (Indonesia) Jauza Fadhila Sugiarto	24,030		~~Indonesia~~	Reserve 11; Decline participation
60	(Peru) Daniela Macías (Peru) Dánica Nishimura	23691		~~Peru~~	Decline participation
61	(India) K. Maneesha (India) Rutaparna Panda	23,570	38	India (3)	Reserve 12
62	(Germany) Annabella Jäger (Germany) Stine Küspert	22,320		~~Germany~~	Decline participation
63	(Malaysia) Anna Cheong (Malaysia) Lim Chiew Sien	22,230		~~Malaysia~~	Decline participation
64	(Thailand) Benyapa Aimsaard (Thailand) Nuntakarn Aimsaard	22,170	39	Thailand (3)	Reserve 13
65	(Japan) Rin Iwanaga (Japan) Kie Nakanishi	21,180	40	Japan (3)	Reserve 14
66	(Indonesia) Ni Ketut Mahadewi Istarani (Indonesia) Tania Oktaviani Kusumah	20,640		~~Indonesia~~	Reserve 15; Decline participation
67	(Indonesia) Anggia Shitta Awanda (Indonesia) Pia Zebadiah Bernadet	20,530		~~Indonesia~~	Reserve 16; Decline participation
68	(Netherlands) Debora Jille (Netherlands) Alyssa Tirtosentono	20,222		~~Netherlands~~	Decline participation
69	(Japan) Sayaka Hobara (Japan) Natsuki Sone	20,020		~~Japan~~	Reserve 17; Decline participation
70	(Malaysia) Teoh Mei Xing (Malaysia) Yap Ling	19,810	41	Malaysia (2)	Reserve 18
71	(Guatemala) Diana Corleto Soto (Guatemala) Nikté Sotomayor	19,539		~~Guatemala~~	Decline participation (on 18 October)
72	(Japan) Chisato Hoshi (Japan) Aoi Matsuda	19,390	42	Japan (4)	Reserve 19
73	(Switzerland) Nadia Fankhauser (Netherlands) Iris Tabeling	19,320		~~Switzerland~~; ~~Netherlands~~	Decline participation
74	(Denmark) Natasja Anthonisen (Denmark) Clara Graversen	19,060		Denmark	Reserve 20
75	(Chinese Taipei) Kuo Yu-wen (Chinese Taipei) Lin Wan-ching	18,838		~~Chinese Taipei~~	Decline participation
76	(Thailand) Ruethaichanok Laisuan (Thailand) Supamart Mingchua	18,820		~~Thailand~~	Reserve 21; Decline participation
77	(Peru) Ines Lucia Castillo Salazar (Peru) Paula la Torre Regal	17,579	29	Peru (1)	
78	(China) Huang Jia (China) Zhang Shuxian	17,120		China	Reserve 22
79	(Switzerland) Aline Müller (Switzerland) Jenjira Stadelmann	16,360	30	Switzerland (1)	
80	(United States) Ariel Lee (United States) Sydney Lee	16,300		~~United States~~	Decline participation
81	(Chinese Taipei) Li Zi-qing (Chinese Taipei) Teng Chun-hsun	15,880		~~Chinese Taipei~~	Reserve 23; Decline participation
82	(Ukraine) Maryna Ilyinskaya (Ukraine) Yelyzaveta Zharka	15,747		~~Ukraine~~	Decline participation
83	(Japan) Akane Araki (Japan) Riko Imai	15,730		Japan	Reserve 24
84	(Hungary) Daniella Gonda (Hungary) Agnes Korosi	15,445		~~Hungary~~	Decline participation
85	(Russia) Viktoriia Kozyreva (Russia) Mariia Sukhova	15,280	43	Russia (3)	Reserve 25
86	(Indonesia) Ni Ketut Mahadewi Istarani (Indonesia) Rizki Amelia Pradipta	15,266		Indonesia	Reserve 26
87	(Czech Republic) Alžběta Bášová (Czech Republic) Michaela Fuchsová	14,824		~~Czech Republic~~	Decline participation
88	(China) Chen Xiaofei (China) Zhou Chaomin	14,730		China	Reserve 27
89	(Republic of Ireland) Kate Frost (Republic of Ireland) Moya Ryan	14,624	31	Ireland (1)	
90	(Austria) Serena Au Yeong (Austria) Katharina Hochmeir	14,552	32	Austria (1)	
91	(Germany) Eva Jansenns (Germany) Kilasu Ostermeyer	14,390		~~Germany~~	Reserve 28; Decline participation
92	(Nigeria) Dorcas Ajoke Adesokan (Nigeria) Uchechukwu Deborah Ukeh	13,965		~~Nigeria~~	Reserve 29; Decline participation
93	(Japan) Erina Honda (Japan) Nozomi Shimizu	13,810		Japan	Reserve 30
94	(Japan) Miki Kashihara (Japan) Miyuki Kato	13,680		Japan	Reserve 31
95	(India) Kuhoo Garg (India) Anoushka Parikh	13,460		India	Reserve 32
96	(Sri Lanka) Thilini Hendahewa (Sri Lanka) Kavidi Sirimannage	13,422		~~Sri Lanka~~	Reserve 33; Decline participation
97	(Netherlands) Alyssa Tirtosentono (Netherlands) Imke van der Aar	13,230	44	Netherlands (1)	Reserve 34
98	(India) Aparna Balan (India) Prajakta Sawant	13,200		India	Reserve 35
99	(India) Ashwini K. Bhat (India) Shikha Gautam	13,180		India	Reserve 36
100	(Portugal) Adriana F. Gonçalves (Portugal) Sonia Goncalves	12,740	45	Portugal (1)	Reserve 38
101	(South Korea) Jung Kyung-eun (South Korea) Chnag Ye-na	12,670		South Korea	Reserve 38
102	(Sweden) Johanna Magnusson (Sweden) Clara Nistad	12,420	46	Sweden (1)	Reserve 39
103	(South Korea) Kim Hye-rin (South Korea) Baek Ha-na	12,400		South Korea	Reserve 40
104	(India) Simran Singhi (India) Ritika Thaker	12,300		India	Reserve 41
105	(South Korea) Kim Hye-jeong (South Korea) Kong Hee-yong	12,120		South Korea	Reserve 42
106	(Indonesia) Agatha Imanuela (Indonesia) Siti Fadia Silva Ramadhanti	12,070		Indonesia	Reserve 43
107	(Maldives) Aminath Nabeeha Abdul Razzaq (Maldives) Fathimath Nabaaha Abdul Razzaq	11,780	47	Maldives (1)	Reserve 44
108	(Ukraine) Anastasiya Prozorova (Ukraine) Valeriya Rudakova	11,681	48	Ukraine (1)	Reserve 45
109	(Japan) Natsu Saito (Japan) Naru Shinoya	11,620		Japan	
110	(Denmark) Isabella Nielsen (Denmark) Marie Louise Steffensen	11,570		Denmark	
111	(Chinese Taipei) Pai Yu-po (Chinese Taipei) Wu Ti-jung	11,316		Chinese Taipei	
112	(Indonesia) Della Destiara Haris (Indonesia) Tania Oktaviani Kusumah	11,300		Indonesia	
113	(Chinese Taipei) Liu Chiao-yun (Chinese Taipei) Wang Yu-qiao	11,060		Chinese Taipei	
114	(Macau) Gong Xue Xin (Macau) Ng Weng Chi	10,732		Macau	
115	(Guatemala) Alejandra Paiz (Guatemala) Mariana Paiz	10,583		Guatemala	
116	(Malaysia) Yap Rui Chen (Malaysia) Yap Yee	10,550		Malaysia	
117	(Japan) Saori Ozaki (Japan) Akane Watanabe	10,360		Japan	
118	(China) Chen Xiaofei (China) Zhang Shuxian	10,040		China	
119	(Spain) Clara Azurmendi (Spain) Beatriz Corrales	10,020	33	Spain (1)	Host nation presenter
150+
168	(New Zealand) Sally Fu (New Zealand) Alyssa Tagle	6,920		~~New Zealand~~	Oceania continental place Decline participation

=== Mixed doubles ===
According to the phase 2 updated by BWF, the following table is the invitation results.

Players who ranked from 1 to 8, whose association could nominate 4 players.
Players who ranked from 9 to 24, whose association could nominate 3 players.
Players who ranked from 25 to 150, whose association could nominate 2 players.

Rank	Nation / Player	Points	Eligibility		Note
1	(China) Zheng Siwei (China) Huang Yaqiong	110,802	1	China (1)	BA highest ranked
2	(China) Wang Yilyu (China) Huang Dongping	103,112		~~China~~	Decline participation (on 7 November)
3	(Thailand) Dechapol Puavaranukroh (Thailand) Sapsiree Taerattanachai	100,563	2	Thailand (1)	
4	(Indonesia) Praveen Jordan (Indonesia) Melati Daeva Oktavianti	87,150	3	Indonesia (1)	
5	(Japan) Yuta Watanabe (Japan) Arisa Higashino	86,893	4	Japan (1)	
6	(South Korea) Seo Seung-jae (South Korea) Chae Yoo-jung	80,720		~~South Korea~~	Decline participation (on 17 November)
7	(England) Marcus Ellis (England) Lauren Smith	70,740	5	England (1)	BE highest ranked
8	(Malaysia) Chan Peng Soon (Malaysia) Goh Liu Ying	70,420	6	Malaysia (1)	
9	(Indonesia) Hafiz Faizal (Indonesia) Gloria Emanuelle Widjaja	65,941		~~Indonesia~~	Decline participation (on 9 November)
10	(France) Thom Gicquel (France) Delphine Delrue	65,932	7	France (1)	
11	(Hong Kong) Tang Chun Man (Hong Kong) Tse Ying Suet	64,966	8	Hong Kong (1)	
12	(Malaysia) Tan Kian Meng (Malaysia) Lai Pei Jing	62,770	9	Malaysia (2)	
13	(Malaysia) Goh Soon Huat (Malaysia) Shevon Jemie Lai	61,822	10	Malaysia (3)	
14	(Germany) Mark Lamsfuß (Germany) Isabel Lohau	59,234	11	Germany (1)	
15	(England) Chris Adcock (England) Gabby Adcock	59,002		~~England~~	Both players retired Decline participation
16	(Denmark) Mathias Christiansen (Denmark) Alexandra Bøje	53,429	12	Denmark (1)	
17	(China) He Jiting (China) Du Yue	52,901		~~China~~	Decline participation (on 5 November)
18	(Netherlands) Robin Tabeling (Netherlands) Cheryl Seinen	52,429	13	Netherlands (1)	
19	(Japan) Yuki Kaneko (Japan) Misaki Matsutomo	50,860	14	Japan (2)	
20	(Russia) Rodion Alimov (Russia) Alina Davletova	48,385	15	Russia (1)	
21	(Indonesia) Rinov Rivaldy (Indonesia) Pitha Haningtyas Mentari	47,030	16	Indonesia (2)	
22	(India) Satwiksairaj Rankireddy (India) Ashwini Ponnappa	46,367		~~India~~	Decline participation
23	(South Korea) Ko Sung-hyun (South Korea) Eom Hye-won	44,740		~~South Korea~~	Decline participation
24	(Chinese Taipei) Lee Jhe-huei (Chinese Taipei) Hsu Ya-ching	46,367	17	Chinese Taipei (1)	
25	(Thailand) Nipitphon Phuangphuapet (Thailand) Savitree Amitrapai	42,712		~~Thailand~~	Decline participation
26	(Canada) Joshua Hurlburt-Yu (Canada) Josephine Wu	41,760		~~Canada~~	BPA highest ranked Decline participation
27	(Malaysia) Hoo Pang Ron (Malaysia) Cheah Yee See	41,610	34	Malaysia (4)	Reserve 1
28	(Chinese Taipei) Wang Chi-lin (Chinese Taipei) Cheng Chi-ya	41,080		~~Chinese Taipei~~	Decline participation
29	(China) Lu Kai (China) Chen Lu	41,080		~~China~~	Reserve 2 Decline participation
30	(Japan) Takuro Hoki (Japan) Wakana Nagahara	40,982		~~Japan~~	Reserve 3 Decline participation
31	(Republic of Ireland) Sam Magee (Republic of Ireland) Chloe Magee	40,633		~~Ireland~~	Decline participation
32	(Denmark) Niclas Nøhr (Denmark) Amalie Magelund	40,319	18	Denmark (2)	
33	(Hong Kong) Chang Tak Ching (Hong Kong) Ng Wing Yung	38,710	19	Hong Kong (2)	
34	(India) Pranaav Jerry Chopra (India) N. Sikki Reddy	38,551		~~India~~	Decline participation
35	(Indonesia) Adnan Maulana (Indonesia) Mychelle Crhystine Bandaso	37,810		~~Indonesia~~	Reserve 4 Decline participation
36	(England) Ben Lane (England) Jessica Pugh	37,440		~~England~~	Decline participation
37	(China) Guo Xinwa (China) Zhang Shuxian	35,510	35	China (2)	Reserve 4
38	(France) Ronan Labar (France) Anne Tran	34,919		~~France~~	Decline participation
39	(Thailand) Supak Jomkoh (Thailand) Supissara Paewsampran	34,800	20	Thailand (2)	Reserve 4
40	(Chinese Taipei) Lee Yang (Chinese Taipei) Yang Ching-tun	33,900		~~Chinese Taipei~~	Decline participation
41	(Germany) Marvin Seidel (Germany) Linda Efler	33,543		~~Germany~~	Decline participation
42	(Chinese Taipei) Yang Po-hsuan (Chinese Taipei) Hu Ling-fang	32,950		~~Chinese Taipei~~	Reserve 6 Decline participation
43	(China) Ou Xuanyi (China) Feng Xueying	31,229	36	China (3)	
44	(China) Ren Xiangyu (China) Zhou Chaomin	31,070		~~China~~	Reserve 7 Decline participation
45	(Japan) Kohei Gondo (Japan) Ayane Kurihara	30,190		~~Japan~~	Reserve 9 Decline participation
46	(Scotland) Adam Hall (Scotland) Julie MacPherson	28,343	21	Scotland (1)	
47	(Denmark) Jeppe Bay (Denmark) Sara Lundgaard	28,070		Denmark	Reserve 10
48	(Egypt) Adham Hatem Elgamal (Egypt) Doha Hany	27,745		~~Egypt~~	BCA highest ranked Decline participation
49	(Malaysia) Chen Tang Jie (Malaysia) Peck Yen Wei	27,487		Malaysia	Reserve 11
50	(Germany) Jones Ralfy Jansen (Germany) Kilasu Ostermeyer	27,220		~~Germany~~	Reserve 12; Decline participation
51	(Denmark) Niclas Nøhr (Denmark) Sara Thygesen	26,990		~~Denmark~~	Reserve 13; Decline participation
52	(Brazil) Fabricio Farias (Brazil) Jaqueline Lima	26,620	22	Brazil (1)	
53	(Russia) Evgenij Dremin (Russia) Evgeniya Dimova	26,468	23	Russia (2)	
54	(India) Arjun M.R. (India) K. Maneesha	26,420	37	India (1)	Reserve 14
55	(Australia) Simon Leung (Australia) Gronya Somerville	26,220	24	Australia (1)	BO highest ranked
56	(France) Eloi Adam (France) Margot Lambert	26,000		~~France~~	Decline participation
57	(Indonesia) Rehan Naufal Kusharjanto (Indonesia) Lisa Ayu Kusumawati	25,660	38	Indonesia (3)	Reserve 15
58	(England) Gregory Mairs (England) Victoria Williams	24,990		~~England~~	Reserve 16; Decline participation
59	(China) Dong Weijie (China) Chen Xiaofei	24,660		China	Reserve 17
60	(Singapore) Danny Bawa Chrisnanta (Singapore) Tan Wei Han	24,656		~~Singapore~~	Decline participation
61	(Indonesia) Ricky Karandasuwardi (Indonesia) Pia Zebadiah Bernadet	24,560		~~Indonesia~~	Reserve 18; Decline participation
62	(Denmark) Mathias Thyrri (Denmark) Mai Surrow	24,490	39	Denmark (3)	Reserve 19
63	(New Zealand) Oliver Leydon-Davis (New Zealand) Anona Pak	24,224	25	New Zealand (1)	
64	(Denmark) Mathias Bay-Smidt (Denmark) Rikke Søby Hansen	23,770		~~Denmark~~	Reserve 20; Decline participation
65	(Chinese Taipei) Lu Ching-yao (Chinese Taipei) Lee Chia-hsin	23,620		~~Chinese Taipei~~	Reserve 21; Decline participation
66	(France) William Villeger (France) Sharone Bauer	22,520		~~France~~	Reserve 22; Decline participation
67	(Denmark) Mikkel Mikkelsen (Denmark) Rikke Søby	22,480	40	Denmark (4)	Reserve 23
68	(India) Venkat Gaurav Prasad (India) Juhi Dewangan	22,150	41	India (2)	Reserve 24
69	(Guatemala) Jonathan Solís (Guatemala) Diana Corleto	21,700	26	Guatemala (1)	Reserve 25
70	(United States) Howard Shu (United States) Paula Lynn Cao Hok	21,580		~~United States~~	Decline participation
71	(Poland) Paweł Śmiłowski (Poland) Magdalena Świerczyńska	21,210		~~Poland~~	Decline participation
72	(South Korea) Choi Sol-gyu (South Korea) Shin Seung-chan	21,040		~~South Korea~~	Decline participation (On 17 November)
73	(Denmark) Rasmus Espersen (Denmark) Christine Busch	20,540		Denmark	Reserve 26
74	(Netherlands) Ties van der Lecq (Netherlands) Debora Jille	20,467	27	Netherlands (2)	
75	(United States) Vinson Chiu (United States) Breanna Chi	20,160		~~United States~~	Decline participation (on 30 October)
76	(Germany) Patrick Scheiel (Germany) Franziska Volkmann	19,950	28	Germany (2)	
77	(Hong Kong) Yeung Ming Nok (Hong Kong) Ng Tsz Yau	19,750	42	Hong Kong (3)	Reserve 27
78	(Vietnam) Đỗ Tuấn Đức (Vietnam) Phạm Như Thảo	19,690		~~Vietnam~~	Decline participation (on 18 October)
79	(Hong Kong) Mak Hee Chun (Hong Kong) Chau Hoi Wah	19,537		Hong Kong	Reserve 28
80	(Belgium) Jona van Nieuwkerke (Belgium) Lise Jaques	19,008	29	Belgium (1)	
81	(Egypt) Ahmed Salah (Egypt) Hadia Hosny	18,866		~~Egypt~~	Decline participation
82	(France) Fabien Delrue (France) Vimala Hériau	18,670		~~France~~	Reserve 29; Decline participation
83	(Japan) Kyohei Yamashita (Japan) Naru Shinoya	18,270	43	Japan (3)	Reserve 30
84	(South Korea) Kim Sa-rang (South Korea) Kim Ha-na	17,800		~~South Korea~~	Reserve 31; Decline participation
85	(Denmark) Emil Lauritzen (Denmark) Iben Bergstein	17,700		Denmark	Reserve 32
86	(Scotland) Christopher Grimley (Scotland) Eleanor O'Donnell	17,616	30	Scotland (2)	
87	(United States) Mathew Fogarty (United States) Isabel Zhong	17,550	31	United States (1)	
88	(India) Dhruv Kapila (India) Meghana Jakkampudi	17,240		~~India~~	Reserve 33; Decline participation
89	(Malaysia) Man Wei Chong (Malaysia) Pearly Tan	17,160		Malaysia	Reserve 34
90	(Indonesia) Dejan Ferdinansyah (Indonesia) Serena Kani	17,150	44	Indonesia (4)	Reserve 35
91	(Japan) Tadayuki Urai (Japan) Rena Miyaura	16,470		Japan	Reserve 36
92	(Mexico) Luis Montoya (Mexico) Vanessa Villalobos	16,170		~~Mexico~~	Decline participation (on 26 October)
93	(Republic of Ireland) Paul Reynolds (Republic of Ireland) Rachael Darragh	16,120	32	Ireland (1)	
96	(Austria) Philip Birker (Austria) Katarina Hochmeir	15,714	45	Austria (1)	
97	(India) Utkarsh Arora (India) Karishma Wadkar	15,640	46	India (3)	
100	(England) Callum Hemming (England) Jessica Pugh	15,250	47	England (2)	
100+
101	(India) Saurabh Sharma (India) Anoushka Parikh	15,120	48	India (4)	
152	(Spain) Alberto Zapico (Spain) Lorena Uslé	8,550	33	Spain (1)	Host nation presenter
