= 2018 Orléans Masters =

Tournament details
- Dates: 27 March – 1 April
- Edition: 7th
- Level: Super 100
- Total prize money: US$75,000
- Venue: Palais des Sports
- Location: Orléans, France

Champions
- Men's singles: (Netherlands) Mark Caljouw
- Women's singles: (Japan) Shiori Saito
- Men's doubles: (Germany) Mark Lamsfuß (Germany) Marvin Emil Seidel
- Women's doubles: (Bulgaria) Gabriela Stoeva (Bulgaria) Stefani Stoeva
- Mixed doubles: (Denmark) Niclas Nøhr (Denmark) Sara Thygesen

The 2018 Orléans Masters was a badminton tournament which took place at Palais des Sports in France from 27 March to 1 April 2018 and had a total purse of $75,000.

== Tournament ==
The 2018 Orléans Masters was the first Super 100 tournament of the 2018 BWF World Tour and also part of the Orléans Masters championships which had been held since 2012. This tournament was organized by the Cercle Laïque des Tourelles Orléans Badminton (CLTO) with the sanction from the French Badminton Federation (FFBaD) and BWF. It was also the first ever new Super 100 Level 6 tournament of the BWF World Tour schedule.

=== Venue ===
This international tournament was held at Palais des Sports in Orléans, Centre-Val de Loire, France.

=== Point distribution ===
Below is the point distribution for each phase of the tournament based on the BWF points system for the BWF Tour Super 100 event.

Winner	Runner-up	3/4	5/8	9/16	17/32	33/64	65/128	129/256
5,500	4,680	3,850	3,030	2,110	1,290	510	240	100

=== Prize money ===
The total prize money for this tournament was US$75,000. Distribution of prize money was in accordance with BWF regulations.

Event	Winner	Finals	Semi-finals	Quarter-finals	Last 16
Singles	$5,625	$2,850	$1,087.5	$450	$262.5
Doubles	$5,925	$2,850	$1,050	$543.75	$281.25

== Men's singles ==
=== Seeds ===
1. (India) Sameer Verma (semi-finals)
2. (Brazil) Ygor Coelho (second round)
3. (Denmark) Rasmus Gemke (final)
4. (Netherlands) Mark Caljouw (champion)
5. (India) Parupalli Kashyap (quarter-finals)
6. (Spain) Pablo Abián (second round)
7. (Denmark) Emil Holst (third round)
8. (France) Lucas Corvée (quarter-finals)

=== Finals ===
Semi-finals
1	(India) Sameer Verma	21	13	12
4	(Netherlands) Mark Caljouw	18	21	21
3	(Denmark) Rasmus Gemke	15	21	22
(France) Lucas Claerbout	21	17	20

Final
4	(Netherlands) Mark Caljouw	10	21	21
3	(Denmark) Rasmus Gemke	21	18	8

=== Top half ===
==== Section 1 ====
First Round
Q6	(Ukraine) V Atrashchenkov	18	18
(Russia) S Sirant	21	21
(India) S Dey	23	19	15
(France) T Rouxel	21	21	21
(Finland) K Koljonen	21	21
(India) A Yeleger	16	10
Q3	(Germany) S Hsiao	13	17
(Republic of Ireland) N Nguyen	21	21

Second Round
1	(India) Sa Verma	21	21
(Russia) S Sirant	7	9
Q7	(India) H M. Gowda	14	7
(France) T Rouxel	21	21
8	(France) L Corvée	18	21	21
(Finland) K Koljonen	21	5	16
Q2	(France) R Frank	15	13
(Republic of Ireland) N Nguyen	21	21

Third Round
1	(India) Sa Verma	21	21
(France) T Rouxel	16	15
8	(France) L Corvée	21	19	21
(Republic of Ireland) N Nguyen	14	21	17

Quarter-finals
1	(India) Sa Verma	17	21	21
8	(France) L Corvée	21	19	15

==== Section 2 ====
First Round
(Finland) I Heino	21	21
(Ukraine) A Pochtarev	11	11
(India) K G Kumar	21	21
(Russia) V Malkov	17	18
(Germany) L Schänzler	13	15
(Denmark) J Ø. Jørgensen	21	21
Q5	(India) G Dutt	21	21
(India) Si Verma	17	18

Second Round
4	(Netherlands) M Caljouw	21	21
(Finland) I Heino	10	12
(Denmark) V Svendsen	21	21
(India) K G Kumar	17	8
6	(Spain) P Abián	21	12	12
(Denmark) J Ø. Jørgensen	17	21	21
(Germany) K Schäfer	12	22
Q5	(India) G Dutt	21	24

Third Round
4	(Netherlands) M Caljouw	21	21
(Denmark) V Svendsen	14	9
(Denmark) J Ø. Jørgensen	22	17	21
Q5	(India) G Dutt	20	21	17

Quarter-finals
4	(Netherlands) M Caljouw	24	23
(Denmark) J Ø. Jørgensen	22	21

=== Bottom half ===
==== Section 3 ====
First Round
Q1	(French Polynesia) R Rossi	21	21
(India) K R Rajarajan	14	17
(Portugal) D N Anjo	17	13
(Croatia) Z Đurkinjak	21	21
PFQ	(Slovakia) M Dratva	17	12
(Finland) E Heino	21	21
(Finland) H Aarnio	21	21
(Czech Republic) A Mendrek	10	17

Second Round
Q1	(French Polynesia) R Rossi	11	18
Q4	(Republic of Ireland) J Magee	21	21
(Croatia) Z Đurkinjak	16	7
5	(India) P Kashyap	21	21
(Finland) E Heino	23	21
(Italy) R Maddaloni	21	17
(Finland) H Aarnio	21	17
3	(Denmark) R Gemke	23	21

Third Round
Q4	(Republic of Ireland) J Magee	11	14
5	(India) P Kashyap	21	21
(Finland) E Heino	16	13
3	(Denmark) R Gemke	21	21

Quarter-finals
5	(India) P Kashyap	18	14
3	(Denmark) R Gemke	21	21

==== Section 4 ====
First Round
(Spain) L E Peñalver	22	19
(India) R Y Chittaboina	24	21
Q8	(India) K Jindal	21	22
(Czech Republic) M Ludík	11	20
PFQ	(Germany) J Persson	16	17
(Germany) A Roovers	21	21
(India) S Jaiswal	19	21	10
(England) S Parsons	21	12	21

Second Round
(India) R Y Chittaboina	23	13
(France) L Claerbout	25	21
Q8	(India) K Jindal	21	22
7	(Denmark) E Holst	23	24
(Germany) A Roovers	21	21
(India) S Sipani	12	13
(England) S Parsons	21	21
2	(Brazil) Y Coelho	12	19

Third Round
(France) L Claerbout	16	21	21
7	(Denmark) E Holst	21	15	10
(Germany) A Roovers	21	13	21
(England) S Parsons	17	21	17

Quarter-finals
(France) L Claerbout	21	19	21
(Germany) A Roovers	13	21	17

== Women's singles ==
=== Seeds ===
1. (Spain) Beatriz Corrales (first round)
2. (Denmark) Mia Blichfeldt (final)
3. (Denmark) Natalia Koch Rohde (withdrew)
4. (Bulgaria) Linda Zechiri (second round)
5. (Malaysia) Lee Ying Ying (second round)
6. (Denmark) Mette Poulsen (first round)
7. (Turkey) Neslihan Yiğit (quarter-finals)
8. (Indonesia) Gregoria Mariska Tunjung (quarter-finals)

=== Finals ===
Semi-finals
(Japan) Shiori Saito	21	18	21
PFQ	(China) Qi Xuefei	10	21	14
(Indonesia) Ruselli Hartawan	17	15
2	(Denmark) Mia Blichfeldt	21	21

Final
(Japan) Shiori Saito	21	21
2	(Denmark) Mia Blichfeldt	18	14

=== Top half ===
==== Section 1 ====
First Round
1	(Spain) B Corrales	7	13
(Japan) S Saito	21	21
(Netherlands) S de Visch Eijbergen	16	10
(Germany) Y Li	21	21
8	(Indonesia) G M Tunjung	21	23
(Denmark) J D Jakobsen	14	21
Q1	(India) M Agrey	21	21
(India) S K P Kudaravalli	18	18

Second Round
(Japan) S Saito	21	21
(Germany) Y Li	14	9
8	(Indonesia) G M Tunjung	21	21
Q1	(India) M Agrey	11	9

Quarter-finals
(Japan) S Saito	21	21
8	(Indonesia) G M Tunjung	14	17

==== Section 2 ====
First Round
4	(Bulgaria) L Zechiri	18	21	21
(Germany) F Deprez	21	17	19
Q4	(India) V Choudhari	19	9
PFQ	(China) Qi XF	21	21
7	(Turkey) N Yiğit	12	21	21
(Malaysia) Lim Y F	21	15	16
PFQ	(Ukraine) N Voytsekh	19	17
PFQ	(Turkey) A Demirbağ	21	21

Second Round
4	(Bulgaria) L Zechiri	18	14
PFQ	(China) Qi XF	21	21
7	(Turkey) N Yiğit	21	21
PFQ	(Turkey) A Demirbağ	8	8

Quarter-finals
PFQ	(China) Qi XF	17	21	21
7	(Turkey) N Yiğit	21	16	11

=== Bottom half ===
==== Section 3 ====
First Round
Q2	(Indonesia) D Y Indah Sari	18	22	13
(Malaysia) Kisona S	21	20	21
(Mauritius) K Foo Kune	5	9
5	(Malaysia) Lee Y Y	21	21
(Israel) K Polikarpova	21	13	7
(Indonesia) R Hartawan	18	21	21
PFQ	(Slovakia) M Repiská	22	17	21
PFQ	(India) S Rane	20	21	13

Second Round
(Malaysia) Kisona S	21	21
5	(Malaysia) Lee Y Y	19	13
(Indonesia) R Hartawan	21	18	21
PFQ	(Slovakia) M Repiská	13	21	14

Quarter-finals
(Malaysia) Kisona S	10	21	17
(Indonesia) R Hartawan	21	17	21

==== Section 4 ====
First Round
(Ukraine) M Ulitina	20	7
(Russia) N Perminova	22	21
(Germany) L Heim	21	21	21
6	(Denmark) M Poulsen	11	23	6
Q3	(Turkey) Ö Bayrak	21	21
(Switzerland) S Jaquet	13	16
(Netherlands) G Mahulette	16	15
2	(Denmark) M Blichfeldt	21	21

Second Round
(Russia) N Perminova	21	22	21
(Germany) L Heim	13	24	9
Q3	(Turkey) Ö Bayrak	10	10
2	(Denmark) M Blichfeldt	21	21

Quarter-finals
(Russia) N Perminova	16	17
2	(Denmark) M Blichfeldt	21	21

== Men's doubles ==
=== Seeds ===
1. (India) Manu Attri / B. Sumeeth Reddy (first round)
2. (Germany) Jones Ralfy Jansen / Josche Zurwonne (first round)
3. (Germany) Mark Lamsfuß / Marvin Emil Seidel (champions)
4. (Netherlands) Jacco Arends / Ruben Jille (second round)
5. (Netherlands) Jelle Maas / Robin Tabeling (second round)
6. (India) Alwin Francis / Nandagopal Kidambi (quarter-finals)
7. (Russia) Evgenij Dremin / Denis Grachev (second round)
8. (Denmark) Kasper Antonsen / Niclas Nøhr (semi-finals)

=== Finals ===
Semi-finals
8	(Denmark) Kasper Antonsen (Denmark) Niclas Nøhr	18	21	19
3	(Germany) Mark Lamsfuß (Germany) Marvin Emil Seidel	21	12	21
Q3	(Indonesia) Akbar Bintang Cahyono (Indonesia) Muhammad Reza Pahlevi Isfahani	14	21	16
(Malaysia) Shia Chun Kang (Malaysia) Tan Wee Gieen	21	13	21

Final
3	(Germany) Mark Lamsfuß (Germany) Marvin Emil Seidel	21	21
(Malaysia) Shia Chun Kang (Malaysia) Tan Wee Gieen	10	18

=== Top half ===
==== Section 1 ====
First Round
1	(India) M Attri (India) B. S Reddy
PFQ	(Malaysia) Chen T J (Malaysia) Hoo P R	w	/	o
(Algeria) M A Belarbi (Algeria) A Hamek	13	9
(Indonesia) S K Gutama (Indonesia) F W Putra	21	21
8	(Denmark) K Antonsen (Denmark) N Nøhr	21	23
Q2	(Germany) T Fischer (Germany) D Hess	14	21
(France) T Gicquel (France) R Labar	21	21
Q1	(Portugal) D N Anjo (Portugal) B Atilano	5	13

Second Round
PFQ	(Malaysia) Chen T J (Malaysia) Hoo P R	12	16
(Indonesia) S K Gutama (Indonesia) F W Putra	21	21
8	(Denmark) K Antonsen (Denmark) N Nøhr	18	21	21
(France) T Gicquel (France) R Labar	21	12	11

Quarter-finals
(Indonesia) S K Gutama (Indonesia) F W Putra	23	18	21
8	(Denmark) K Antonsen (Denmark) N Nøhr	21	21	23

==== Section 2 ====
First Round
3	(Germany) M Lamsfuß (Germany) M E Seidel	16	21	21
(Denmark) M Bay-Smidt (Denmark) F Søgaard Mortensen	21	17	18
(Russia) R Alimov (Russia) P Kotsarenko	19	19
(Germany) P Käsbauer (Germany) J Pistorius	21	21
6	(India) A Francis (India) N Kidambi	23	21
(Denmark) J Bay (Denmark) R Kjær	21	14
(Russia) K Abramov (Russia) A Zinchenko	21	18	17
(Poland) M Bochat (Poland) A Cwalina	11	21	21

Second Round
3	(Germany) M Lamsfuß (Germany) M E Seidel	21	21
(Germany) P Käsbauer (Germany) J Pistorius	18	17
6	(India) A Francis (India) N Kidambi	15	21	21
(Poland) M Bochat (Poland) A Cwalina	21	17	17

Quarter-finals
3	(Germany) M Lamsfuß (Germany) M E Seidel	19	21	21
6	(India) A Francis (India) N Kidambi	21	14	8

=== Bottom half ===
==== Section 3 ====
First Round
(India) T Kona (India) S Sharma	15	15
Q3	(Indonesia) A B Cahyono (Indonesia) M R P Isfahani	21	21
PFQ	(Indonesia) R N Kusharjanto (Indonesia) P Kusumawardana	20	14
5	(Netherlands) J Maas (Netherlands) R Tabeling	22	21
(Denmark) F Colberg (Denmark) J Fischer Nielsen	21	21
PFQ	(Germany) P Scheiel (Germany) J Voigt	13	14
(Belgium) M Dierickx (Belgium) F Golinski	7	16
4	(Netherlands) J Arends (Netherlands) R Jille	21	21

Second Round
Q3	(Indonesia) A B Cahyono (Indonesia) M R P Isfahani	22	18	21
5	(Netherlands) J Maas (Netherlands) R Tabeling	20	21	14
(Denmark) F Colberg (Denmark) J Fischer Nielsen	20	21	22
4	(Netherlands) J Arends (Netherlands) R Jille	22	18	20

Quarter-finals
Q3	(Indonesia) A B Cahyono (Indonesia) M R P Isfahani	21	10	22
(Denmark) F Colberg (Denmark) J Fischer Nielsen	18	21	20

==== Section 4 ====
First Round
(Switzerland) M Bonny (Switzerland) O Schaller	16	21	19
(Russia) N Khakimov (Russia) A Parakhodin	21	14	21
(Finland) H Aarnio (Finland) I Heino	22	16
7	(Russia) E Dremin (Russia) D Grachev	24	21
Q4	(France) R Frank (France) F Riancho	10	15
PFQ	(France) M Gangloff (France) T Rodrigues	21	21
(Malaysia) Shia C K (Malaysia) Tan W G	22	21	21
2	(Germany) J R Jansen (Germany) J Zurwonne	24	18	18

Second Round
(Russia) N Khakimov (Russia) A Parakhodin	21	12	23
7	(Russia) E Dremin (Russia) D Grachev	12	21	21
PFQ	(France) M Gangloff (France) T Rodrigues	17	12
(Malaysia) Shia C K (Malaysia) Tan W G	21	21

Quarter-finals
(Russia) N Khakimov (Russia) A Parakhodin	14	13
(Malaysia) Shia C K (Malaysia) Tan W G	21	21

== Women's doubles ==
=== Seeds ===
1. (Bulgaria) Gabriela Stoeva / Stefani Stoeva (champions)
2. (Russia) Anastasia Chervyakova / Olga Morozova (first round)
3. (Germany) Isabel Herttrich / Carla Nelte (withdrew)
4. (Denmark) Maiken Fruergaard / Sara Thygesen (withdrew)

=== Finals ===
Semi-finals
1	(Bulgaria) Gabriela Stoeva (Bulgaria) Stefani Stoeva	w	/	o
(Netherlands) Selena Piek (Netherlands) Cheryl Seinen
(France) Delphine Delrue (France) Léa Palermo	21	14	21
(France) Émilie Lefel (France) Anne Tran	17	21	10

Final
1	(Bulgaria) Gabriela Stoeva (Bulgaria) Stefani Stoeva	21	21
(France) Delphine Delrue (France) Léa Palermo	8	14

=== Top half ===
==== Section 1 ====
First Round
(Denmark) J Finne-Ipsen (Denmark) R Søby Hansen
(Malaysia) Soong F C (Malaysia) Tee J Y	w	/	o
(Indonesia) F D Kusuma (Indonesia) R Sugiarto	21	21
(Germany) L Efler (Germany) O Konon	19	18
(Malaysia) Goh Y C (Malaysia) Yap C W	20	21	21
(Russia) E Bolotova (Russia) A Davletova	22	19	13

Second Round
1	(Bulgaria) G Stoeva (Bulgaria) S Stoeva	24	21
(Malaysia) Soong F C (Malaysia) Tee J Y	22	18
(Indonesia) F D Kusuma (Indonesia) R Sugiarto	21	14	17
(Malaysia) Goh Y C (Malaysia) Yap C W	13	21	21

Quarter-finals
1	(Bulgaria) G Stoeva (Bulgaria) S Stoeva	21	21
(Malaysia) Goh Y C (Malaysia) Yap C W	4	9

==== Section 2 ====
First Round
4	(Denmark) M Fruergaard (Denmark) S Thygesen
(Germany) K Ostermeyer (Netherlands) I Tabeling	w	/	o
(Denmark) A Magelund (Denmark) F Ravn	21	21
(India) K Garg (India) N B Hazarika	11	10
(Netherlands) S Piek (Netherlands) C Seinen	17	21	21
(Sweden) A Högström (Sweden) C Nistad	21	11	13
(Belgium) L Jaques (Belgium) F Vandenhoucke	13	6
(Indonesia) A Imanuela (Indonesia) S F S Ramadhanti	21	21

Second Round
(Germany) K Ostermeyer (Netherlands) I Tabeling	18	21	13
(Denmark) A Magelund (Denmark) F Ravn	21	16	21
(Netherlands) S Piek (Netherlands) C Seinen	17	21	21
(Indonesia) A Imanuela (Indonesia) S F S Ramadhanti	21	18	16

Quarter-finals
(Denmark) A Magelund (Denmark) F Ravn	9	18
(Netherlands) S Piek (Netherlands) C Seinen	21	21

=== Bottom half ===
==== Section 3 ====
First Round
(Finland) J Nyström (Finland) S Pekkola	21	10	17
(Switzerland) C Burkart (Switzerland) J Stadelmann	19	21	21
(Denmark) M Surrow (Denmark) J van Zaane
(France) D Delrue (France) L Palermo	w	/	o
(France) V Faulmann (France) M Lambert	9	7
(Malaysia) Cheah Y S (Malaysia) Peck Y W	21	21
(Denmark) A Bøje (Denmark) S Lundgaard	w	/	o
3	(Germany) I Herttrich (Germany) C Nelte

Second Round
(Switzerland) C Burkart (Switzerland) J Stadelmann	18	13
(France) D Delrue (France) L Palermo	21	21
(Malaysia) Cheah Y S (Malaysia) Peck Y W	21	8	16
(Denmark) A Bøje (Denmark) S Lundgaard	18	21	21

Quarter-finals
(France) D Delrue (France) L Palermo	21	21
(Denmark) A Bøje (Denmark) S Lundgaard	13	18

==== Section 4 ====
First Round
(Ukraine) M Ulitina (Ukraine) N Voytsekh	21	18	11
(Japan) M Nakamura (Japan) M Shigeta	19	21	21
(Ukraine) M Ilyinskaya (Ukraine) Y Zharka	w	/	o
(Germany) E Janssens (Germany) J Petrikowski
(Denmark) J D Jakobsen (Denmark) D Søby Hansen	17	19
(France) É Lefel (France) A Tran	21	21
(Indonesia) M C Bandaso (Indonesia) W O Kandow	21	21
2	(Russia) A Chervyakova (Russia) O Morozova	13	19

Second Round
(Japan) M Nakamura (Japan) M Shigeta	21	21
(Ukraine) M Ilyinskaya (Ukraine) Y Zharka	15	10
(France) É Lefel (France) A Tran	21	13	22
(Indonesia) M C Bandaso (Indonesia) W O Kandow	13	21	20

Quarter-finals
(Japan) M Nakamura (Japan) M Shigeta	14	16
(France) É Lefel (France) A Tran	21	21

== Mixed doubles ==
=== Seeds ===
1. (Germany) Mark Lamsfuß / Isabel Herttrich (first round)
2. (France) Ronan Labar / Audrey Fontaine (quarter-finals)
3. (Germany) Marvin Emil Seidel / Linda Efler (quarter-finals)
4. (Netherlands) Jacco Arends / Selena Piek (quarter-finals)
5. (Republic of Ireland) Sam Magee / Chloe Magee (second round)
6. (Russia) Evgenij Dremin / Evgenia Dimova (semi-finals)
7. (Denmark) Mikkel Mikkelsen / Mai Surrow (first round)
8. (Netherlands) Robin Tabeling / Cheryl Seinen (second round)

=== Finals ===
Semi-finals
6	(Russia) Evgenij Dremin (Russia) Evgenia Dimova	22	18	17
(Denmark) Niclas Nøhr (Denmark) Sara Thygesen	20	21	21
(Indonesia) Alfian Eko Prasetya (Indonesia) Marsheilla Gischa Islami	11	16
Q4	(Germany) Peter Käsbauer (Germany) Olga Konon	21	21

Final
(Denmark) Niclas Nøhr (Denmark) Sara Thygesen	21	21
Q4	(Germany) Peter Käsbauer (Germany) Olga Konon	19	9

=== Top half ===
==== Section 1 ====
First Round
1	(Germany) M Lamsfuß (Germany) I Herttrich	21	15	19
(Indonesia) A Ramadiansyah (Indonesia) M C Bandaso	15	21	21
(France) B Kersaudy (France) L Palermo	19	21	16
(Indonesia) R N Kusharjanto (Indonesia) S F S Ramadhanti	21	12	21
6	(Russia) E Dremin (Russia) E Dimova	21	23
(Switzerland) O Schaller (Switzerland) C Burkart	14	21
(Netherlands) J Maas (Netherlands) I van der Aar	13	17
(Russia) R Alimov (Russia) A Daveltova	21	21

Second Round
(Indonesia) A Ramadiansyah (Indonesia) M C Bandaso	21	21
(Indonesia) R N Kusharjanto (Indonesia) S F S Ramadhanti	17	18
6	(Russia) E Dremin (Russia) E Dimova	22	21	21
(Russia) R Alimov (Russia) A Daveltova	24	19	14

Quarter-finals
(Indonesia) A Ramadiansyah (Indonesia) M C Bandaso	16	17
6	(Russia) E Dremin (Russia) E Dimova	21	21

==== Section 2 ====
First Round
3	(Germany) M E Seidel (Germany) L Efler	21	21
Q3	(Indonesia) P Kusumawardana (Indonesia) R Sugiarto	19	12
(United States) M Fogarty (United States) I Zhong	10	6
Q1	(Germany) J Zurwonne (Germany) E Janssens	21	21
8	(Netherlands) R Tabeling (Netherlands) C Seinen	21	21
(India) S Sharma (India) A Parikh	18	15
(Bulgaria) A Vlaar (Netherlands) I Tabeling	17	13
(Denmark) N Nøhr (Denmark) S Thygesen	21	21

Second Round
3	(Germany) M E Seidel (Germany) L Efler	21	21
Q1	(Germany) J Zurwonne (Germany) E Janssens	13	19
8	(Netherlands) R Tabeling (Netherlands) C Seinen	22	8
(Denmark) N Nøhr (Denmark) S Thygesen	24	21

Quarter-finals
3	(Germany) M E Seidel (Germany) L Efler	16	12
(Denmark) N Nøhr (Denmark) S Thygesen	21	21

=== Bottom half ===
==== Section 3 ====
First Round
(Finland) A Kaisti (Finland) J Nyström	18	18
(Indonesia) A E Prasetya (Indonesia) M G Islami	21	21
(Indonesia) A B Cahyono (Indonesia) W O Kandow	21	21
7	(Denmark) M Mikkelsen (Denmark) M Surrow	16	19
(Russia) A Zinchenko (Russia) O Morozova	19	13
Q2	(Sweden) R Eidestedt (Sweden) C Nistad	21	21
(England) G Mairs (England) J Moore	18	13
4	(Netherlands) J Arends (Netherlands) S Piek	21	21

Second Round
(Indonesia) A E Prasetya (Indonesia) M G Islami	19	21	21
(Indonesia) A B Cahyono (Indonesia) W O Kandow	21	15	15
Q2	(Sweden) R Eidestedt (Sweden) C Nistad	15	16
4	(Netherlands) J Arends (Netherlands) S Piek	21	21

Quarter-finals
(Indonesia) A E Prasetya (Indonesia) M G Islami	10	21	21
4	(Netherlands) J Arends (Netherlands) S Piek	21	16	15

==== Section 4 ====
First Round
Q4	(Germany) P Käsbauer (Germany) O Konon	21	21
(Denmark) K Knudsen (Denmark) I Nielsen	17	17
PFQ	(Ukraine) A Pochtarev (Ukraine) N Voytsekh	22	11
5	(Republic of Ireland) S Magee (Republic of Ireland) C Magee	24	21
(Denmark) J Fischer Nielsen (Denmark) A Bøje	21	21
(Malaysia) Chen T J (Malaysia) Peck Y W	19	15
(India) R Kapoor (India) K Garg	11	18
2	(France) R Labar (France) A Fontaine	21	21

Second Round
Q4	(Germany) P Käsbauer (Germany) O Konon	21	21
5	(Republic of Ireland) S Magee (Republic of Ireland) C Magee	18	16
(Denmark) J Fischer Nielsen (Denmark) A Bøje	21	17	19
2	(France) R Labar (France) A Fontaine	16	21	21

Quarter-finals
Q4	(Germany) P Käsbauer (Germany) O Konon	21	21
2	(France) R Labar (France) A Fontaine	17	12

Preceded by 2018 All England Open	BWF World Tour; 2018 BWF season	Succeeded by 2018 Lingshui China Masters
