= Tan Wee Gieen =

Malaysian badminton player (born 1994)

Tan Wee Gieen 陈蔚元
Personal information
- Born: 14 May 1994 (age 32) Muar, Johor, Malaysia
- Years active: 2011–present

Sport
- Country: Malaysia
- Sport: Badminton
- Handedness: Right

Men's doubles
- Highest ranking: 52
- Current ranking: 56 (7 June 2018)
- BWF profile
Medal record
Men's badminton
Representing Malaysia
Asian Junior Championships
Bronze medal – third place	2012 Gimcheon	Mixed team

Tan Wee Gieen (born 14 May 1994) is a Malaysian badminton player. He started playing badminton at home when he was nine years old and influenced by his family. His brothers, Tan Wee Kiong and Tan Wee Tat are also professional badminton players.

== Achievements ==
=== BWF World Tour (1 runner-up) ===
The BWF World Tour, announced on 19 March 2017 and implemented in 2018, is a series of elite badminton tournaments, sanctioned by Badminton World Federation (BWF). The BWF World Tour are divided into six levels, namely World Tour Finals, Super 1000, Super 750, Super 500, Super 300 (part of the HSBC World Tour), and the BWF Tour Super 100.

Men's doubles
Year	Tournament	Level	Partner	Opponent	Score	Result
2018	Orléans Masters	Super 100	(Malaysia) Shia Chun Kang	(Germany) Mark Lamsfuß (Germany) Marvin Emil Seidel	10–21, 18–21	(silver) Runner-up

=== BWF International Challenge/Series (6 runners-up) ===
Men's doubles
Year	Tournament	Partner	Opponent	Score	Result
2017	Malaysia International	(Malaysia) Shia Chun Kang	(Malaysia) Goh Sze Fei (Malaysia) Nur Izzuddin	19–21, 12–21	(silver) Runner-up
2015	Bangladesh International	(Malaysia) Tan Chee Tean	(India) Akshay Dewalkar (India) Pranaav Jerry Chopra	16–21, 16–21	(silver) Runner-up
2013	Finnish Open	(Malaysia) Mohd Lutfi Zaim Abdul Khalid	(Malaysia) Nelson Wei Keat Heg (Malaysia) Teo Ee Yi	14–21, 12–21	(silver) Runner-up

Mixed doubles
Year	Tournament	Partner	Opponent	Score	Result
2015	Bangladesh International	(Malaysia) Shevon Jemie Lai	(Singapore) Terry Hee Yong Kai (Singapore) Tan Wei Han	10–21, 21–19, 12–21	(silver) Runner-up
2014	Bangladesh International	(Malaysia) Peck Yen Wei	(Malaysia) Tan Chee Tean (Malaysia) Shevon Jemie Lai	17–21, 18–21	(silver) Runner-up
2012	Smiling Fish International	(Malaysia) Chow Mei Kuan	(Malaysia) Wong Fai Yin (Malaysia) Shevon Jemie Lai	13–21, 21–23	(silver) Runner-up

BWF International Challenge tournament
BWF International Series tournament
BWF Future Series tournament
