= Perth International (badminton) =

The Perth International in badminton, is an international open held in Perth, Australia. The event is first held as Western Australia International in 2003. The tournament sanctioned by the Badminton World Federation, and part of the Badminton Oceania circuit.

== Previous winners ==
Year	Men's singles	Women's singles	Men's doubles	Women's doubles	Mixed doubles
2003	(Hong Kong) Ng Wei	(Japan) Miho Tanaka	(Singapore) Hendri Saputra (Singapore) Denny Setiawan	(Japan) Seiko Yamada (Japan) Shizuka Yamamoto	(New Zealand) Daniel Shirley (New Zealand) Sara Runesten-Petersen
2004	(Malaysia) Sairul Amar Ayob	(Chinese Taipei) Huang Chia-chi	(Japan) Naoki Kawamae (Japan) Yusuke Shinkai	(Japan) Noriko Okuma (Japan) Miyuki Tai	(Australia) Travis Denney (Australia) Kate Wilson-Smith
2019 FS	(Chinese Taipei) Chi Yu-jen	(Chinese Taipei) Liang Ting-yu	(Malaysia) Shia Chun Kang (Malaysia) Tan Boon Heong	(Chinese Taipei) Cheng Yu-chieh (Chinese Taipei) Tseng Yu-chi	(Chinese Taipei) Chi Yu-jen (Chinese Taipei) Lin Xiao-min

== Performances by nation ==
Top Nations
Pos	Nation	MS	WS	MD	WD	XD	Total
1	Chinese Taipei	1	2	0	1	1	5
2	Japan	0	1	1	2	0	4
3	Malaysia	1	0	1	0	0	2
4	Australia	0	0	0	0	1	1
4	Hong Kong	1	0	0	0	0	1
4	New Zealand	0	0	0	0	1	1
4	Singapore	0	0	1	0	0	1
Total		3	3	3	3	3	15
