= Shia Chun Kang =

Malaysian badminton player

Shia Chun Kang 谢俊康
Personal information
- Born: September 27, 1996 (age 30) Tangkak, Johor, Malaysia
- Years active: 2013-present

Sport
- Country: Malaysia
- Sport: Badminton
- Handedness: Right
- Coached by: Vountus Indra Mawan

Men's doubles
- Career record: 64 wins, 54 losses
- Highest ranking: 52 (with Tan Wee Gieen; 14 April 2018)
- Current ranking: 97 (with Tan Boon Heong; 26 April 2022)
- BWF profile

Shia Chun Kang (Chinese: 谢俊康; pinyin: Xiè Jùnkāng; born 27 September 1996) is a Malaysian badminton player. Together with his former partner, Tan Wee Gieen, he achieved a career-high ranking of 52 in the men's doubles category.

== Career ==
He debuted in the 2013 Victoria International tournament. He was one of the semifinalists in the 2014 Auckland International. In 2017, he partnered with Tan Wee Gieen and reached the Malaysia International finals but lost to compatriots Goh Sze Fei and Nur Izzuddin.

They failed to win their first Superseries title as they were runners-up at the 2018 Orléans Masters, losing to Mark Lamsfuss and Marvin Seidel of Germany.

In 2019, he partnered with Tan Boon Heong and won the Perth International tournament. In the same year, they also entered the finals of both South Australia International and Dubai International respectively. They also participated in the 2019 Macau Open but lost to Li Junhui and Liu Yuchen in the first round.

== Achievements ==
=== BWF World Tour (1 runner-up) ===
The BWF World Tour, announced on 19 March 2017 and implemented in 2018, is a series of elite badminton tournaments, sanctioned by Badminton World Federation (BWF). The BWF World Tour are divided into six levels, namely World Tour Finals, Super 1000, Super 750, Super 500, Super 300 (part of the HSBC World Tour), and the BWF Tour Super 100.

Men's doubles
Year	Tournament	Level	Partner	Opponent	Score	Result
2018	Orléans Masters	Super 100	(Malaysia) Tan Wee Gieen	(Germany) Mark Lamsfuß (Germany) Marvin Emil Seidel	10–21, 18–21	(silver) Runner-up

=== BWF International Challenge/Series (1 title, 3 runners-up) ===
Men's doubles
Year	Tournament	Partner	Opponent	Score	Result
2017	Malaysia International	(Malaysia) Tan Wee Gieen	(Malaysia) Goh Sze Fei (Malaysia) Nur Izzuddin	19–21, 12–21	(silver) Runner-up
2019	Perth International	(Malaysia) Tan Boon Heong	(Chinese Taipei) Lee Chia-hao (Chinese Taipei) Liu Wei-chi	21–17, 21–16	(gold) Winner
2019	South Australia International	(Malaysia) Tan Boon Heong	(South Korea) Kim Duk-young (South Korea) Kim Sa-rang	14–21, 21–17, 16–21	(silver) Runner-up
2019	Dubai International	(Malaysia) Tan Boon Heong	(Japan) Keiichiro Matsui (Japan) Yoshinori Takeuchi	14–21, 14–21	(silver) Runner-up

BWF International Challenge tournament
BWF International Series tournament
BWF Future Series tournament
