= Azerbaijan International (badminton) =

Badminton championship

The Azerbaijan International is an international badminton tournament held in Baku, Azerbaijan. The event is part of the Badminton World Federation's International Challenge and part of the Badminton Europe Elite Circuit.

== Past winners ==
Year	Men's singles	Women's singles	Men's doubles	Women's doubles	Mixed doubles	Ref
2019	(Denmark) Rasmus Gemke	(Thailand) Phittayaporn Chaiwan	(Germany) Mark Lamsfuß (Germany) Marvin Emil Seidel	(England) Chloe Birch (England) Lauren Smith	(France) Thom Gicquel (France) Delphine Delrue	
2020	Cancelled (Note: This tournament, originally to be played from 16 to 19 July, was later cancelled due to COVID-19 pandemic in Azerbaijan.)					
2021– 2023	No competition					
2024	(South Korea) Jeon Hyeok-jin	(India) Malvika Bansod	(Czech Republic) Ondřej Král (Czech Republic) Adam Mendrek	(Bulgaria) Gabriela Stoeva (Bulgaria) Stefani Stoeva	(India) Sathish Karunakaran (India) Aadya Variyath	
2025	No competition					
2026	(Poland) Dominik Kwinta	(India) Devika Sihag	(England) Alex Green (England) Zach Russ	(Japan) Miku Sugiyama (Japan) Natsumi Takasaki	(India) Sathwik Reddy Kanapuram (India) Radhika Sharma	

== Performances by nation ==
As of 2026 edition

Pos	Nation	MS	WS	MD	WD	XD	Total
1	India	0	2	0	0	2	4
2	England	0	0	1	1	0	2
3	Bulgaria	0	0	0	1	0	1
3	Czech Republic	0	0	1	0	0	1
3	Denmark	1	0	0	0	0	1
3	France	0	0	0	0	1	1
3	Germany	0	0	1	0	0	1
3	Japan	0	0	0	1	0	1
3	Poland	1	0	0	0	0	1
3	South Korea	1	0	0	0	0	1
3	Thailand	0	1	0	0	0	1
Total		3	3	3	3	3	15
