= Mark Lamsfuß =

German badminton player (born 1994)

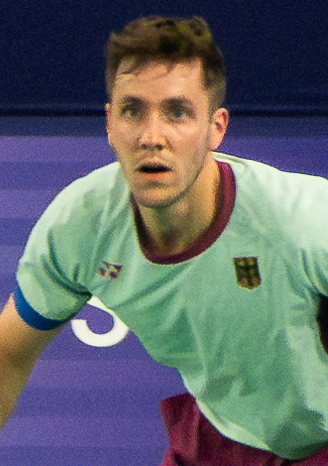
- Lamsfuß at the 2024 Summer Olympics

Personal information
- Born: 19 April 1994 (age 32) Wipperfürth, Germany
- Height: 1.86 m (6 ft 1 in)

Sport
- Country: Germany
- Sport: Badminton
- Handedness: Right

Men's & mixed doubles
- Highest ranking: 11 (MD with Marvin Seidel, 27 September 2022); 7 (XD with Isabel Lohau, 15 November 2022)
- BWF profile
Medal record
Men's badminton
Representing Germany
World Championships
Bronze medal – third place	2022 Tokyo	Mixed doubles
European Championships
Gold medal – first place	2022 Madrid	Men's doubles
Gold medal – first place	2022 Madrid	Mixed doubles
Silver medal – second place	2021 Kyiv	Men's doubles
Bronze medal – third place	2018 Huelva	Mixed doubles
Bronze medal – third place	2021 Kyiv	Mixed doubles
European Mixed Team Championships
Silver medal – second place	2019 Copenhagen	Mixed team
Bronze medal – third place	2017 Lubin	Mixed team
Bronze medal – third place	2021 Vantaa	Mixed team
Bronze medal – third place	2023 Aire-sur-la-Lys	Mixed team
European Men's Team Championships
Bronze medal – third place	2016 Kazan	Men's team
Bronze medal – third place	2018 Kazan	Men's team
Bronze medal – third place	2024 Łódź	Men's team
European Junior Championships
Bronze medal – third place	2013 Ankara	Mixed doubles
Bronze medal – third place	2013 Ankara	Mixed team

Mark Lamsfuß (born 19 April 1994) is a German badminton player and plays for the BC Wipperfeld. He and his partner, Isabel Lohau won a bronze medal in mixed doubles at the 2022 BWF World Championships.

== Career ==
Lamsfuß started playing badminton at aged 3, and in 2013 he won the Dutch Open Junior tournament in the mixed doubles event partnered with Franziska Volkmann. He and Volkmann also won bronze at the 2013 European Junior Badminton Championships.

He became the Germany national badminton team in 2013, and at that year he reach the men's doubles semifinal round of the senior tournament at the Irish Open International Challenge with Fabian Holzer. In 2016, he clinched the mixed doubles title at the National Championships tournament partnered with Isabel Herttrich from BC Bischmisheim. He won his first BWF International tournament at the 2017 Orleans International in the mixed doubles event partnered with Herttrich.

In 2021, he competed at the European Championships in Kyiv, Ukraine, reaching the semi-finals in the mixed doubles with Herttrich and the finals in the men's doubles with Seidel. Unfortunately, he was tested positive for COVID-19, and the organizers decided to cancel the finals. Nevertheless, Lamsfuß then received a silver and a bronze medal for his achievements in the tournament. In July, he competed at the 2020 Summer Olympics in the men's doubles with Marvin Seidel and mixed doubles with Isabel Herttrich, but was eliminated in the group stage in both events.

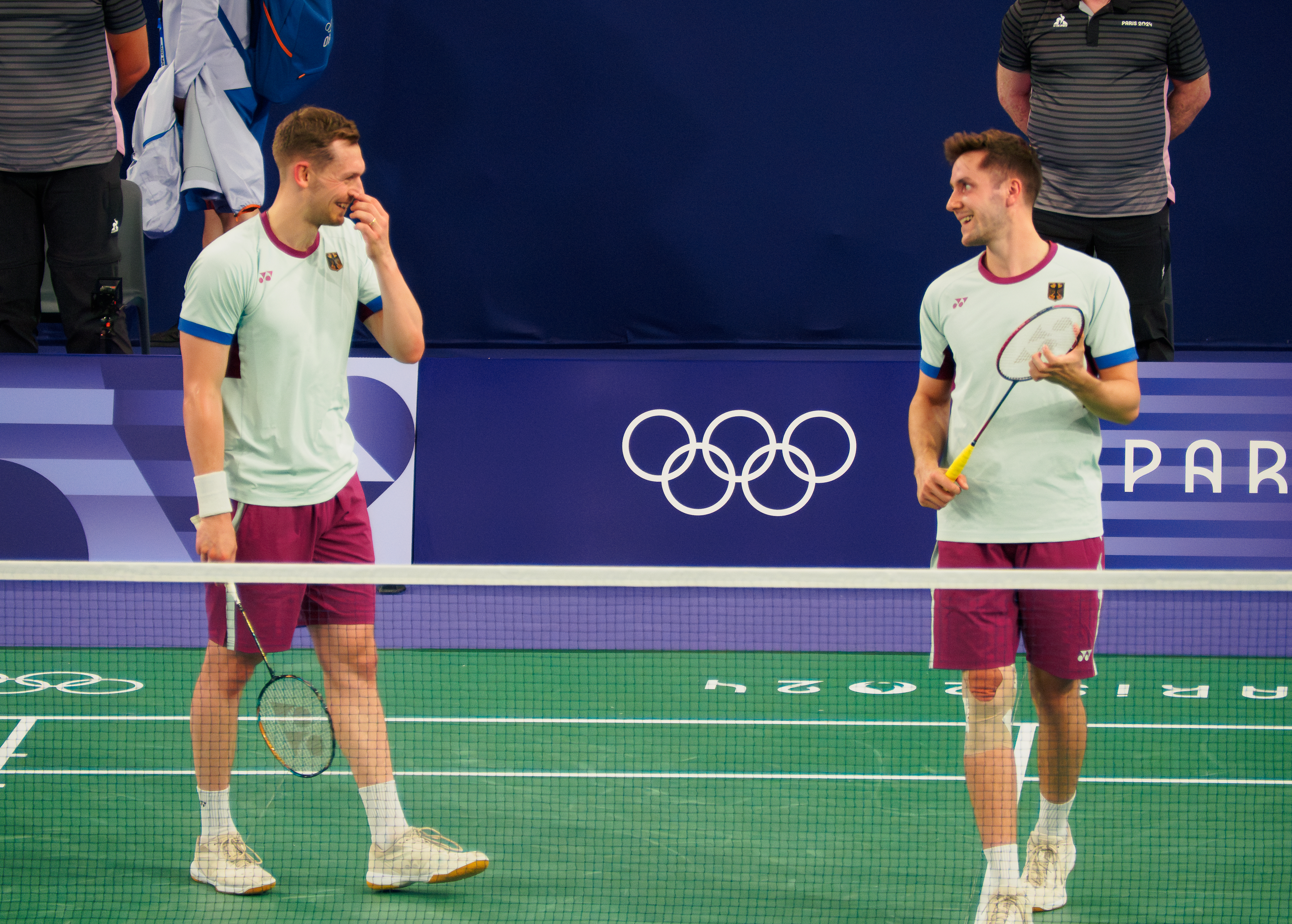
Lamsfuß (right) and Seidel at the 2024 Summer Olympics

At the 2024 Summer Olympics, Lamsfuß and Seidel withdrew during the men's doubles due to Lamsfuß injuring his knee.

== Achievements ==
=== BWF World Championships ===
Mixed doubles
Year	Venue	Partner	Opponent	Score	Result
2022	Tokyo Metropolitan Gymnasium; Tokyo, Japan	(Germany) Isabel Lohau	(Japan) Yuta Watanabe (Japan) Arisa Higashino	8–21, 6–21	Bronze

=== European Championships ===
Men's doubles
Year	Venue	Partner	Opponent	Score	Result
2021	Palace of Sports, Kyiv, Ukraine	(Germany) Marvin Seidel	(Russia) Vladimir Ivanov (Russia) Ivan Sozonov	Walkover	Silver
2022	Polideportivo Municipal Gallur, Madrid, Spain	(Germany) Marvin Seidel	(Scotland) Alexander Dunn (Scotland) Adam Hall	21–17, 21–16	Gold

Mixed doubles
Year	Venue	Partner	Opponent	Score	Result
2018	Palacio de los Deportes Carolina Marín, Huelva, Spain	(Germany) Isabel Herttrich	(England) Chris Adcock (England) Gabby Adcock	17–21, 21–15, 23–25	Bronze
2021	Palace of Sports, Kyiv, Ukraine	(Germany) Isabel Herttrich	(Russia) Rodion Alimov (Russia) Alina Davletova	22–20, 14–21, 22–24	Bronze
2022	Polideportivo Municipal Gallur, Madrid, Spain	(Germany) Isabel Lohau	(France) Thom Gicquel (France) Delphine Delrue	16–21, 22–20, 21–16	Gold

=== European Junior Championships ===
Mixed doubles
Year	Venue	Partner	Opponent	Score	Result
2013	ASKI Sport Hall, Ankara, Turkey	(Germany) Franziska Volkmann	(Denmark) David Daugaard (Denmark) Maiken Fruergaard	11–21, 21–19, 12–21	Bronze

=== BWF World Tour (4 titles, 5 runners-up) ===
The BWF World Tour, which was announced on 19 March 2017 and implemented in 2018, is a series of elite badminton tournaments sanctioned by the Badminton World Federation (BWF). The BWF World Tour is divided into levels of World Tour Finals, Super 1000, Super 750, Super 500, Super 300 (part of the HSBC World Tour), and the BWF Tour Super 100.

Men's doubles
Year	Tournament	Level	Partner	Opponent	Score	Result
2018	Orléans Masters	Super 100	(Germany) Marvin Seidel	(Malaysia) Shia Chun Kang (Malaysia) Tan Wee Gieen	21–10, 21–18	(gold) Winner
2018	Canada Open	Super 100	(Germany) Marvin Seidel	(England) Marcus Ellis (England) Chris Langridge	21–19, 18–21, 20–22	(silver) Runner-up
2019	Dutch Open	Super 100	(Germany) Marvin Seidel	(Russia) Vladimir Ivanov (Russia) Ivan Sozonov	19–21, 16–21	(silver) Runner-up
2021	Swiss Open	Super 300	(Germany) Marvin Seidel	(Denmark) Kim Astrup (Denmark) Anders Skaarup Rasmussen	16–21, 11–21	(silver) Runner-up

Mixed doubles
Year	Tournament	Level	Partner	Opponent	Score	Result
2018	Swiss Open	Super 300	(Germany) Isabel Herttrich	(England) Marcus Ellis (England) Lauren Smith	22–20, 21–19	(gold) Winner
2018	Canada Open	Super 100	(Germany) Isabel Herttrich	(England) Marcus Ellis (England) Lauren Smith	13–21, 4–21	(silver) Runner-up
2020	Denmark Open	Super 750	(Germany) Isabel Herttrich	(England) Chris Adcock (England) Gabby Adcock	18–21, 21–11, 21–14	(gold) Winner
2020	SaarLorLux Open	Super 100	(Germany) Isabel Herttrich	(Denmark) Mathias Christiansen (Denmark) Alexandra Bøje	15–21, 21–19, 11–21	(silver) Runner-up
2022	Swiss Open	Super 300	(Germany) Isabel Lohau	(Malaysia) Goh Soon Huat (Malaysia) Shevon Jemie Lai	12–21, 21–18, 21–17	(gold) Winner

=== BWF International Challenge/Series (3 titles, 3 runners-up) ===
Men's doubles
Year	Tournament	Partner	Opponent	Score	Result
2017	White Nights	(Germany) Marvin Seidel	(Russia) Konstantin Abramov (Russia) Alexandr Zinchenko	23–21, 21–14	(gold) Winner
2019	Azerbaijan International	(Germany) Marvin Seidel	(England) Marcus Ellis (England) Chris Langridge	21–17, 23–21	(gold) Winner

Mixed doubles
Year	Tournament	Partner	Opponent	Score	Result
2017	Orleans International	(Germany) Isabel Herttrich	(Chinese Taipei) Chang Ko-chi (Chinese Taipei) Chang Hsin-tien	21–9, 21–15	(gold) Winner
2017	White Nights	(Germany) Isabel Herttrich	(Germany) Marvin Seidel (Germany) Linda Efler	21–18, 16–21, 15–21	(silver) Runner-up
2019	Azerbaijan International	(Germany) Isabel Herttrich	(France) Thom Gicquel (France) Delphine Delrue	21–9, 21–23, 15–21	(silver) Runner-up
2022	Welsh International	(Germany) Isabel Lohau	(Denmark) Jesper Toft (Denmark) Clara Graversen	18–21, 21–14, 16–21	(silver) Runner-up

BWF International Challenge tournament
BWF International Series tournament
BWF Future Series tournament
