= Marvin Seidel =

German badminton player (born 1995)

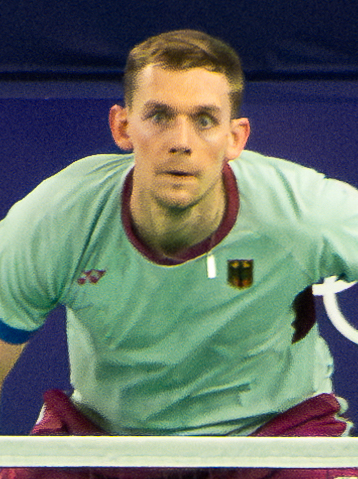
- Seidel at the 2024 Summer Olympics

Personal information
- Born: Marvin Emil Seidel; 9 November 1995 (age 31) Dudweiler, Germany
- Height: 1.90 m (6 ft 3 in)

Sport
- Country: Germany
- Sport: Badminton
- Handedness: Right

Men's & mixed doubles
- Highest ranking: 11 (MD with Mark Lamsfuß, 27 September 2022); 12 (XD with Linda Efler, 5 July 2018)
- Current ranking: 26 (XD with Thuc Phuong Nguyen, 10 November 2026)
- BWF profile
Medal record
Men's badminton
Representing Germany
European Championships
Gold medal – first place	2022 Madrid	Men's doubles
Silver medal – second place	2021 Kyiv	Men's doubles
Bronze medal – third place	2026 Huelva	Mixed doubles
European Mixed Team Championships
Silver medal – second place	2019 Copenhagen	Mixed team
Bronze medal – third place	2017 Lubin	Mixed team
Bronze medal – third place	2021 Vantaa	Mixed team
Bronze medal – third place	2023 Aire-sur-la-Lys	Mixed team
Bronze medal – third place	2025 Baku	Mixed team
European Men's Team Championships
Bronze medal – third place	2016 Kazan	Men's team
Bronze medal – third place	2018 Kazan	Men's team
Bronze medal – third place	2024 Łódź	Men's team
European Junior Championships
Bronze medal – third place	2013 Ankara	Boys' doubles
Bronze medal – third place	2013 Ankara	Mixed team

Marvin Emil Seidel (German pronunciation: [ˈmaʁvɪn ˈzaɪdl̩]; born 9 November 1995) is a German badminton player. He was the bronze medalist at the 2013 European Junior Championships in the boys' doubles, and a silver medalist at the 2021 European Championships in the men's doubles event.

== Career ==
In July 2021, Seidel competed at the 2020 Summer Olympics in the men's doubles partnered with Mark Lamsfuß, but he was eliminated in the group stage.

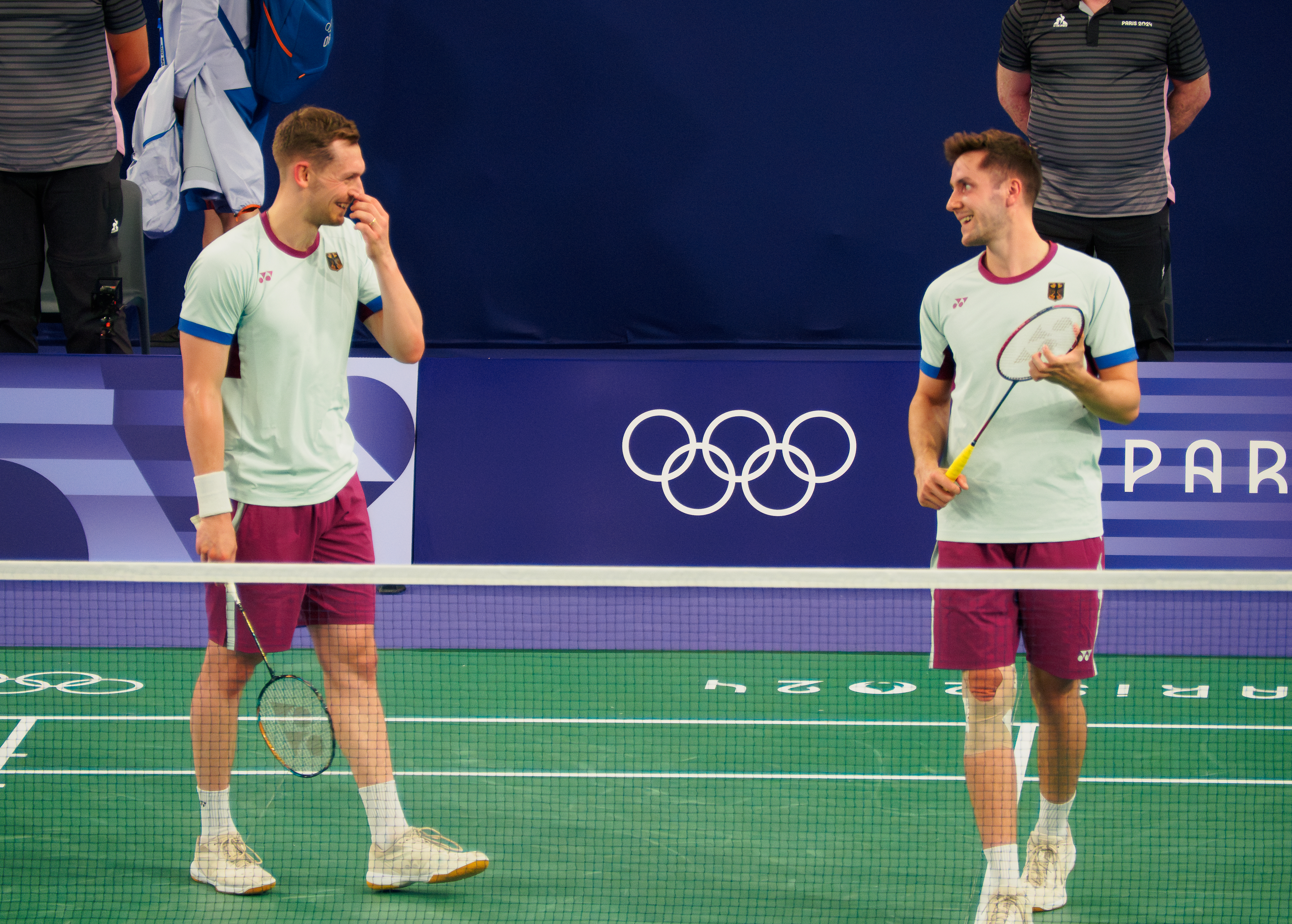
Seidel (left) and Lamsfuß at the 2024 Summer Olympics

At the 2024 Summer Olympics, Seidel and Lamsfuß withdrew during the men's doubles due to Lamsfuß injuring his knee.

== Achievements ==
=== European Championships ===
Men's doubles
Year	Venue	Partner	Opponent	Score	Result
2021	Palace of Sports; Kyiv, Ukraine	(Germany) Mark Lamsfuß	(Russia) .Vladimir Ivanov (Russia) Ivan Sozonov	Walkover	Silver
2022	Polideportivo Municipal Gallur; Madrid, Spain	(Germany) Mark Lamsfuß	(Scotland) Alexander Dunn (Scotland) Adam Hall	21–17, 21–16	Gold

Mixed doubles
Year	Venue	Partner	Opponent	Score	Result
2026	Palacio de los Deportes Carolina Marín; Huelva, Spain	(Germany) Thuc Phuong Nguyen	(Denmark) Mathias Christiansen (Denmark) Alexandra Bøje	12–21, 16–21	Bronze

=== European Junior Championships ===
Boys' doubles
Year	Venue	Partner	Opponent	Score	Result
2013	ASKI Sport Hall; Ankara, Turkey	(Germany) Johannes Pistorius	(Denmark) Mathias Christiansen (Denmark) David Daugaard	20–22, 16–21	Bronze

=== BWF World Tour (1 title, 4 runners-up) ===
The BWF World Tour, which was announced on 19 March 2017 and implemented in 2018, is a series of elite badminton tournaments sanctioned by the Badminton World Federation (BWF). The BWF World Tour is divided into levels of World Tour Finals, Super 1000, Super 750, Super 500, Super 300 (part of the HSBC World Tour), and the BWF Tour Super 100.

Men's doubles
Year	Tournament	Level	Partner	Opponent	Score	Result
2018	Orléans Masters	Super 100	(Germany) Mark Lamsfuß	(Malaysia) Shia Chun Kang (Malaysia) Tan Wee Gieen	21–10, 21–18	(gold) Winner
2018	Canada Open	Super 100	(Germany) Mark Lamsfuß	(England) Marcus Ellis (England) Chris Langridge	21–19, 18–21, 20–22	(silver) Runner-up
2019	Dutch Open	Super 100	(Germany) Mark Lamsfuß	(Russia) Vladimir Ivanov (Russia) Ivan Sozonov	19–21, 16–21	(silver) Runner-up
2021	Swiss Open	Super 300	(Germany) Mark Lamsfuß	(Denmark) Kim Astrup (Denmark) Anders Skaarup Rasmussen	16–21, 11–21	(silver) Runner-up

Mixed doubles
Year	Tournament	Level	Partner	Opponent	Score	Result
2018	U.S. Open	Super 300	(Germany) Linda Efler	(Malaysia) Chan Peng Soon (Malaysia) Goh Liu Ying	19–21, 15–21	(silver) Runner-up

=== BWF International Challenge/Series (6 titles, 3 runners-up) ===
Men's doubles
Year	Tournament	Partner	Opponent	Score	Result
2015	Dutch International	(Germany) Johannes Pistorius	(Denmark) Kasper Antonsen (Denmark) Oliver Babic	9–21, 15–21	(silver) Runner-up
2015	Slovenian International	(Germany) Johannes Pistorius	(Croatia) Zvonimir Đurkinjak (Croatia) Zvonimir Hölbling	14–21, 21–16, 10–21	(silver) Runner-up
2017	White Nights	(Germany) Mark Lamsfuß	(Russia) Konstantin Abramov (Russia) Alexandr Zinchenko	23–21, 21–14	(gold) Winner
2019	Azerbaijan International	(Germany) Mark Lamsfuß	(England) Marcus Ellis (England) Chris Langridge	21–17, 23–21	(gold) Winner

Mixed doubles
Year	Tournament	Partner	Opponent	Score	Result
2013	Bulgarian Eurasia Open	(Germany) Yvonne Li	(Finland) Anton Kaisti (Bulgaria) Gabriela Stoeva	21–19, 9–21, 18–21	(silver) Runner-up
2015	Spanish International	(Germany) Linda Efler	(England) Gregory Mairs (England) Jenny Moore	21–16, 21–12	(gold) Winner
2017	White Nights	(Germany) Linda Efler	(Germany) Mark Lamsfuß (Germany) Isabel Herttrich	18–21, 21–16, 21–15	(gold) Winner
2025	Luxembourg Open	(Germany) Thuc Phuong Nguyen	(Denmark) Kristoffer Kolding (Denmark) Mette Werge	21–13, 22–24, 21–11	(gold) Winner
2025	Réunion Open	(Germany) Thuc Phuong Nguyen	(Malaysia) Jimmy Wong (Malaysia) Lai Pei Jing	17–21, 22–20, 21–18	(gold) Winner

BWF International Challenge tournament
BWF International Series tournament
BWF Future Series tournament
