= Isabel Lohau =

German badminton player (born 1992)

Personal information
- Born: Isabel Herttrich; 17 March 1992 (age 34) Hersbruck, Germany
- Years active: 2009–present
- Height: 1.66 m (5 ft 5 in)

Sport
- Country: Germany
- Sport: Badminton
- Handedness: Right

Women's & mixed doubles
- Highest ranking: 20 (WD with Linda Efler 27 September 2022); 7 (XD with Mark Lamsfuß 15 November 2022)
- BWF profile
Medal record
Women's badminton
Representing Germany
World Championships
Bronze medal – third place	2022 Tokyo	Mixed doubles
European Games
Bronze medal – third place	2023 Kraków–Małopolska	Women's doubles
European Championships
Gold medal – first place	2022 Madrid	Mixed doubles
Silver medal – second place	2022 Madrid	Women's doubles
Bronze medal – third place	2018 Huelva	Mixed doubles
Bronze medal – third place	2021 Kyiv	Mixed doubles
European Mixed Team Championships
Silver medal – second place	2019 Copenhagen	Mixed team
Bronze medal – third place	2015 Leuven	Mixed team
Bronze medal – third place	2017 Lubin	Mixed team
Bronze medal – third place	2021 Vantaa	Mixed team
Bronze medal – third place	2023 Aire-sur-la-Lys	Mixed team
European Women's Team Championships
Gold medal – first place	2012 Amsterdam	Women's team
Silver medal – second place	2018 Kazan	Women's team
Silver medal – second place	2020 Liévin	Women's team
Bronze medal – third place	2014 Basel	Women's team
Bronze medal – third place	2016 Kazan	Women's team
World Junior Championships
Bronze medal – third place	2010 Guadalajara	Mixed doubles
European Junior Championships
Gold medal – first place	2011 Vantaa	Mixed team
Bronze medal – third place	2009 Milan	Mixed team
Bronze medal – third place	2011 Vantaa	Girls' doubles
Bronze medal – third place	2011 Vantaa	Mixed doubles

Isabel Lohau (née Herttrich; born 17 March 1992) is a German badminton player.

== Career ==
Herttrich (later Lohau) started playing badminton at her hometown Hersbruck in 2001, and in 2010 she joined the Germany national badminton team. She along with national team won the 2011 European Junior Championships and 2012 European Women's Team Championships. In the individual event, Lohau also won the bronze medals at the 2010 World Junior Championships in the mixed doubles, 2011 European Junior Championships in the mixed and girls' doubles, and at the 2018 and 2021 European Championships in the mixed doubles. She represented her country competing at the 2020 Summer Olympics. She made history alongside her mixed doubles partner Mark Lamsfuß in securing the bronze medal for Germany at the 2022 World Championships, becoming the first pair from her country to do so.

== Achievements ==
=== BWF World Championships ===
Mixed doubles
Year	Venue	Partner	Opponent	Score	Result
2022	Tokyo Metropolitan Gymnasium; Tokyo, Japan	(Germany) Mark Lamsfuß	(Japan) Yuta Watanabe (Japan) Arisa Higashino	8–21, 6–21	Bronze

=== European Games ===
Women's doubles
Year	Venue	Partner	Opponent	Score	Result
2023	Arena Jaskółka; Tarnów, Poland	(Germany) Linda Efler	(Netherlands) Debora Jille (Netherlands) Cheryl Seinen	14–21, 21–19, 17–21	Bronze

=== European Championships ===
Women's doubles
Year	Venue	Partner	Opponent	Score	Result
2022	Polideportivo Municipal Gallur; Madrid, Spain	(Germany) Linda Efler	(Bulgaria) Gabriela Stoeva (Bulgaria) Stefani Stoeva	14–21, 10–21	Silver

Mixed doubles
Year	Venue	Partner	Opponent	Score	Result
2018	Palacio de los Deportes Carolina Marín; Huelva, Spain	(Germany) Mark Lamsfuß	(England) Chris Adcock (England) Gabby Adcock	17–21, 21–15, 23–25	Bronze
2021	Palace of Sports; Kyiv, Ukraine	(Germany) Mark Lamsfuß	(Russia) Rodion Alimov (Russia) Alina Davletova	22–20, 14–21, 22–24	Bronze
2022	Polideportivo Municipal Gallur; Madrid, Spain	(Germany) Mark Lamsfuß	(France) Thom Gicquel (France) Delphine Delrue	16–21, 22–20, 21–16	Gold

=== BWF World Junior Championships ===
Mixed doubles
Year	Venue	Partner	Opponent	Score	Result
2010	Domo del Code Jalisco; Guadalajara, Mexico	(Germany) Max Schwenger	(China) Liu Cheng (China) Bao Yixin	18–21, 15–21	Bronze

=== European Junior Championships ===
Girls' doubles
Year	Venue	Partner	Opponent	Score	Result
2011	Energia Areena; Vantaa, Finland	(Germany) Inken Wienefeld	(Denmark) Mette Poulsen (Denmark) Ditte Strunge Larsen	22–20, 14–21, 18–21	Bronze

Mixed doubles
Year	Venue	Partner	Opponent	Score	Result
2011	Energia Areena; Vantaa, Finland	(Germany) Max Schwenger	(Denmark) Kim Astrup (Denmark) Line Kjærsfeldt	23–25, 14–21	Bronze

=== BWF World Tour (3 titles, 4 runners-up) ===
The BWF World Tour, which was announced on 19 March 2017 and implemented in 2018, is a series of elite badminton tournaments sanctioned by the Badminton World Federation (BWF). The BWF World Tour is divided into levels of World Tour Finals, Super 1000, Super 750, Super 500, Super 300 (part of the HSBC World Tour), and the BWF Tour Super 100.

Women's doubles
Year	Tournament	Level	Partner	Opponent	Score	Result
2018	Canada Open	Super 100	(Germany) Carla Nelte	(Japan) Ayako Sakuramoto (Japan) Yukiko Takahata	13–21, 15–21	(silver) Runner-up
2022	Swiss Open	Super 300	(Germany) Linda Efler	(Bulgaria) Gabriela Stoeva (Bulgaria) Stefani Stoeva	14–21, 12–21	(silver) Runner-up

Mixed doubles
Year	Tournament	Level	Partner	Opponent	Score	Result
2018	Swiss Open	Super 300	(Germany) Mark Lamsfuß	(England) Marcus Ellis (England) Lauren Smith	22–20, 21–19	(gold) Winner
2018	Canada Open	Super 100	(Germany) Mark Lamsfuß	(England) Marcus Ellis (England) Lauren Smith	13–21, 4–21	(silver) Runner-up
2020	Denmark Open	Super 750	(Germany) Mark Lamsfuß	(England) Chris Adcock (England) Gabby Adcock	18–21, 21–11, 21–14	(gold) Winner
2020	SaarLorLux Open	Super 100	(Germany) Mark Lamsfuß	(Denmark) Mathias Christiansen (Denmark) Alexandra Bøje	15–21, 21–19, 11–21	(silver) Runner-up
2022	Swiss Open	Super 300	(Germany) Mark Lamsfuß	(Malaysia) Goh Soon Huat (Malaysia) Shevon Jemie Lai	12–21, 21–18, 21–17	(gold) Winner

=== BWF Grand Prix (1 title) ===
The BWF Grand Prix had two levels, the Grand Prix and Grand Prix Gold. It was a series of badminton tournaments sanctioned by the Badminton World Federation (BWF) and played between 2007 and 2017.

Mixed doubles
Year	Tournament	Partner	Opponent	Score	Result
2014	U.S. Grand Prix	(Germany) Peter Käsbauer	(United States) Howard Shu (United States) Eva Lee	21–12, 21–14	(gold) Winner

BWF Grand Prix Gold tournament
BWF Grand Prix tournament

=== BWF International Challenge/Series (10 titles, 7 runners-up) ===
Women's doubles
Year	Tournament	Partner	Opponent	Score	Result
2012	Slovenian International	(Germany) Inken Wienefeld	(Wales) Sarah Thomas (Wales) Carissa Turner	21–14, 13–21, 21–17	(gold) Winner
2012	Swiss International	(Germany) Carla Nelte	(England) Heather Olver (England) Kate Robertshaw	15–21, 21–15, 21–23	(silver) Runner-up
2013	White Nights	(Germany) Carla Nelte	(France) Audrey Fontaine (France) Émilie Lefel	22–20, 21–12	(gold) Winner
2015	Czech Open	(Germany) Birgit Michels	(France) Marie Batomene (France) Émilie Lefel	21–13, 21–9	(gold) Winner
2026	Czech International	(Germany) Stine Küspert	(Czech Republic) Klára Šilhavá (Czech Republic) Radka Šilhavá	21–9, 21–7	(gold) Winner
2026	Dutch Open	(Germany) Stine Küspert	(Netherlands) Kirsten de Wit (Netherlands) Debora Jille	21–17, 21–17	(gold) Winner
2026	Czech Open	(Germany) Stine Küspert	(Germany) Selin Hübsch (Germany) Amelie Lehmann	21–19, 21–10	(gold) Winner

Mixed doubles
Year	Tournament	Partner	Opponent	Score	Result
2012	Bulgarian International	(Germany) Peter Käsbauer	(Germany) Michael Fuchs (Germany) Birgit Michels	9–21, 13–21	(silver) Runner-up
2012	Swiss International	(Germany) Peter Käsbauer	(England) Ben Stawski (England) Alyssa Lim	21–18, 21–12	(gold) Winner
2013	Swedish Masters	(Germany) Peter Käsbauer	(Netherlands) Jelle Maas (Netherlands) Iris Tabeling	21–17, 21–14	(gold) Winner
2013	White Nights	(Germany) Peter Käsbauer	(Russia) Sergey Shumilkin (Russia) Viktoriia Vorobeva	24–22, 21–15	(gold) Winner
2014	Swedish Masters	(Germany) Peter Käsbauer	(Scotland) Robert Blair (Scotland) Imogen Bankier	22–24, 21–14, 16–21	(silver) Runner-up
2014	Irish Open	(Germany) Peter Käsbauer	(Denmark) Niclas Nøhr (Denmark) Sara Thygesen	10–21, 18–21	(silver) Runner-up
2017	Orleans International	(Germany) Mark Lamsfuß	(Chinese Taipei) Chang Ko-chi (Chinese Taipei) Chang Hsin-tien	21–9, 21–15	(gold) Winner
2017	White Nights	(Germany) Mark Lamsfuß	(Germany) Marvin Seidel (Germany) Linda Efler	21–18, 16–21, 15–21	(silver) Runner-up
2019	Azerbaijan International	(Germany) Mark Lamsfuß	(France) Thom Gicquel (France) Delphine Delrue	21–9, 21–23, 15–21	(silver) Runner-up
2022	Welsh International	(Germany) Mark Lamsfuß	(Denmark) Jesper Toft (Denmark) Clara Graversen	18–21, 21–14, 16–21	(silver) Runner-up

BWF International Challenge tournament
BWF International Series tournament
BWF Future Series tournament
