= Orléans Masters =

Badminton tournament held in France

- Official website
- Founded: 1994; 32 years ago
- Editions: 14 (2026)
- Location: Orléans; France
- Venue: Palais des Sports
- Prize money: US$240,000 (2026)

Men's
- Draw: 32S / 32D
- Current champions: Alex Lanier (singles); Hu Keyuan; Lin Xiangyi (doubles)
- Most singles titles: 2 Mark Caljouw; Toma Junior Popov; Alex Lanier
- Most doubles titles: 2 Adam Cwalina; Przemysław Wacha

Women's
- Draw: 32S / 32D
- Current champions: Nozomi Okuhara (singles); Sumire Nakade; Miyu Takahashi (doubles)
- Most singles titles: 2 Beatriz Corrales
- Most doubles titles: 3 Gabriela Stoeva; Stefani Stoeva

Mixed doubles
- Draw: 32
- Current champions: Thom Gicquel; Delphine Delrue
- Most titles (male): 3 Mathias Christiansen
- Most titles (female): 2 Imogen Bankier; Lena Grebak

Super 300
- Canada Open; German Open; Korea Masters; Macau Open; New Zealand Open; Orléans Masters; Spain Masters; Swiss Open; Syed Modi International; Taipei Open; Thailand Masters; U.S. Open

Last completed
- 2026 Orléans Masters

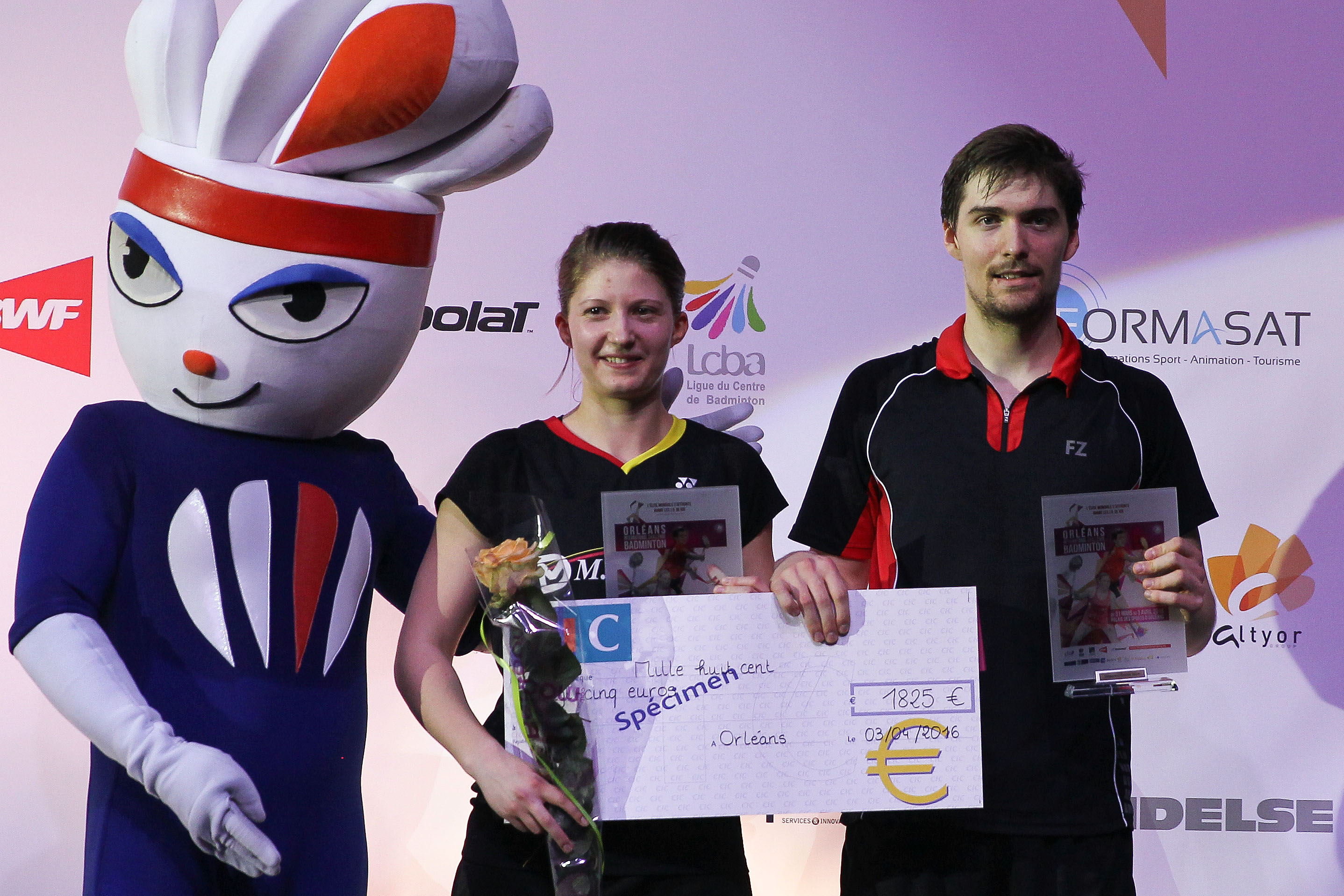
Lena Grebak (center) and Mathias Christiansen of Denmark, pictured after retaining mixed doubles title in 2016.

The Orléans Masters championships is an open badminton tournament held in France. This tournament is organized by the Cercle Laïque des Tourelles Orléans Badminton and held in the Palais des Sports in Orléans.

This tournament began as a regional event in 1994, and later became a national event in 1999. In 2012, this tournament was known as the French International, a part of the European circuit, and sanctioned by the Badminton World Federation as International Series. The French International upgraded its level as the International Challenge in 2013, and changed its name to Orléans International in 2015, to avoid confusion with the already established French Open held in Paris.

In June 2017, the Badminton World Federation accepted the candidacy of CLTO to organize a higher ranking tournament. Thus, from 2018 and for a period of four years, the Orléans International became the Orléans Masters and entered the 30 best badminton tournaments in the world as BWF Tour Super 100 level, with a total monetary prize of $65,000. This is equivalent to the previous Grand Prix level tournaments prior to the World Tour. From 2023 onwards, it has become a Super 300 tournament.

== Past winners ==
Year	Men's singles	Women's singles	Men's doubles	Women's doubles	Mixed doubles
2012	(India) Anand Pawar	(Netherlands) Judith Meulendijks	(Germany) Peter Käsbauer (Germany) Josche Zurwonne	(Netherlands) Judith Meulendijks (Germany) Johanna Goliszewski	(Germany) Peter Käsbauer (Germany) Johanna Goliszewski
2013	(England) Rajiv Ouseph	(Spain) Beatriz Corrales	(Poland) Adam Cwalina (Poland) Przemysław Wacha	(Japan) Rie Eto (Japan) Yu Wakita	(Scotland) Robert Blair (Scotland) Imogen Bankier
2014	(Spain) Pablo Abián	(Spain) Beatriz Corrales	(Poland) Adam Cwalina (Poland) Przemysław Wacha	(Scotland) Imogen Bankier (Bulgaria) Petya Nedelcheva	(Scotland) Robert Blair (Scotland) Imogen Bankier
2015	(Ukraine) Dmytro Zavadsky	(Denmark) Natalia Koch Rohde	(England) Matthew Nottingham (England) Harley Towler	(Bulgaria) Gabriela Stoeva (Bulgaria) Stefani Stoeva	(Denmark) Mathias Christiansen (Denmark) Lena Grebak
2016	(Denmark) Emil Holst	(Malaysia) Goh Jin Wei	(Sweden) Richard Eidestedt (Sweden) Nico Ruponen	(England) Heather Olver (England) Lauren Smith	(Denmark) Mathias Christiansen (Denmark) Lena Grebak
2017	(Netherlands) Mark Caljouw	(Scotland) Kirsty Gilmour	(Chinese Taipei) Liao Min-chun (Chinese Taipei) Su Cheng-heng	(Japan) Asumi Kugo (Japan) Megumi Yokoyama	(Germany) Mark Lamsfuß (Germany) Isabel Herttrich
2018	(Netherlands) Mark Caljouw	(Japan) Shiori Saito	(Germany) Mark Lamsfuß (Germany) Marvin Seidel	(Bulgaria) Gabriela Stoeva (Bulgaria) Stefani Stoeva	(Denmark) Niclas Nøhr (Denmark) Sara Thygesen
2019	(Japan) Koki Watanabe	(Japan) Saena Kawakami	(Chinese Taipei) Lee Yang (Chinese Taipei) Wang Chi-lin	(England) Chloe Birch (England) Lauren Smith	(France) Thom Gicquel (France) Delphine Delrue
2020	Cancelled (Note: This tournament, originally to be played from 24 to 29 March, was later cancelled due to coronavirus pandemic in France.)				
2021	(France) Toma Junior Popov	(Thailand) Busanan Ongbamrungphan	(England) Ben Lane (England) Sean Vendy	(Thailand) Jongkolphan Kititharakul (Thailand) Rawinda Prajongjai	(Denmark) Mathias Christiansen (Denmark) Alexandra Bøje
2022	(France) Toma Junior Popov	(Indonesia) Putri Kusuma Wardani	(Netherlands) Ruben Jille (Netherlands) Ties van der Lecq	(Bulgaria) Gabriela Stoeva (Bulgaria) Stefani Stoeva	(Singapore) Terry Hee (Singapore) Tan Wei Han
2023	(India) Priyanshu Rajawat	(Spain) Carolina Marín	(China) Chen Boyang (China) Liu Yi	(Japan) Rena Miyaura (Japan) Ayako Sakuramoto	(Malaysia) Chen Tang Jie (Malaysia) Toh Ee Wei
2024	(Japan) Yushi Tanaka	(Japan) Tomoka Miyazaki	(Malaysia) Choong Hon Jian (Malaysia) Muhammad Haikal	(Indonesia) Meilysa Trias Puspita Sari (Indonesia) Rachel Allessya Rose	(China) Cheng Xing (China) Zhang Chi
2025	(France) Alex Lanier	(South Korea) An Se-young	(South Korea) Kang Min-hyuk (South Korea) Ki Dong-ju	(South Korea) Kim Hye-jeong (South Korea) Kong Hee-yong	(Denmark) Jesper Toft (Denmark) Amalie Magelund
2026	(France) Alex Lanier	(Japan) Nozomi Okuhara	(China) Hu Keyuan (China) Lin Xiangyi	(Japan) Sumire Nakade (Japan) Miyu Takahashi	(France) Thom Gicquel (France) Delphine Delrue

=== Performances by nation ===
As of 2026 edition

Pos	Nation	MS	WS	MD	WD	XD	Total
1	Japan	2	4		4		10
2	Denmark	1	1			5	7
3	France*	4				2	6
4	England	1		2	2		5
5	Germany			2	0.5	2	4.5
5	Netherlands	2	1	1	0.5		4.5
7	Spain	1	3				4
8	Bulgaria				3.5		3.5
8	Scotland		1		0.5	2	3.5
10	China			2		1	3
10	Malaysia		1	1		1	3
10	South Korea		1	1	1		3
13	Chinese Taipei			2			2
13	India	2					2
13	Indonesia		1		1		2
13	Poland			2			2
13	Thailand		1		1		2
18	Singapore					1	1
18	Sweden			1			1
18	Ukraine	1					1
Total		14	14	14	14	14	70

* Host nation

== See also ==
- French Open (badminton), a higher level badminton tournament also hosted by France.
