= Linda Efler =

German badminton player (born 1995)

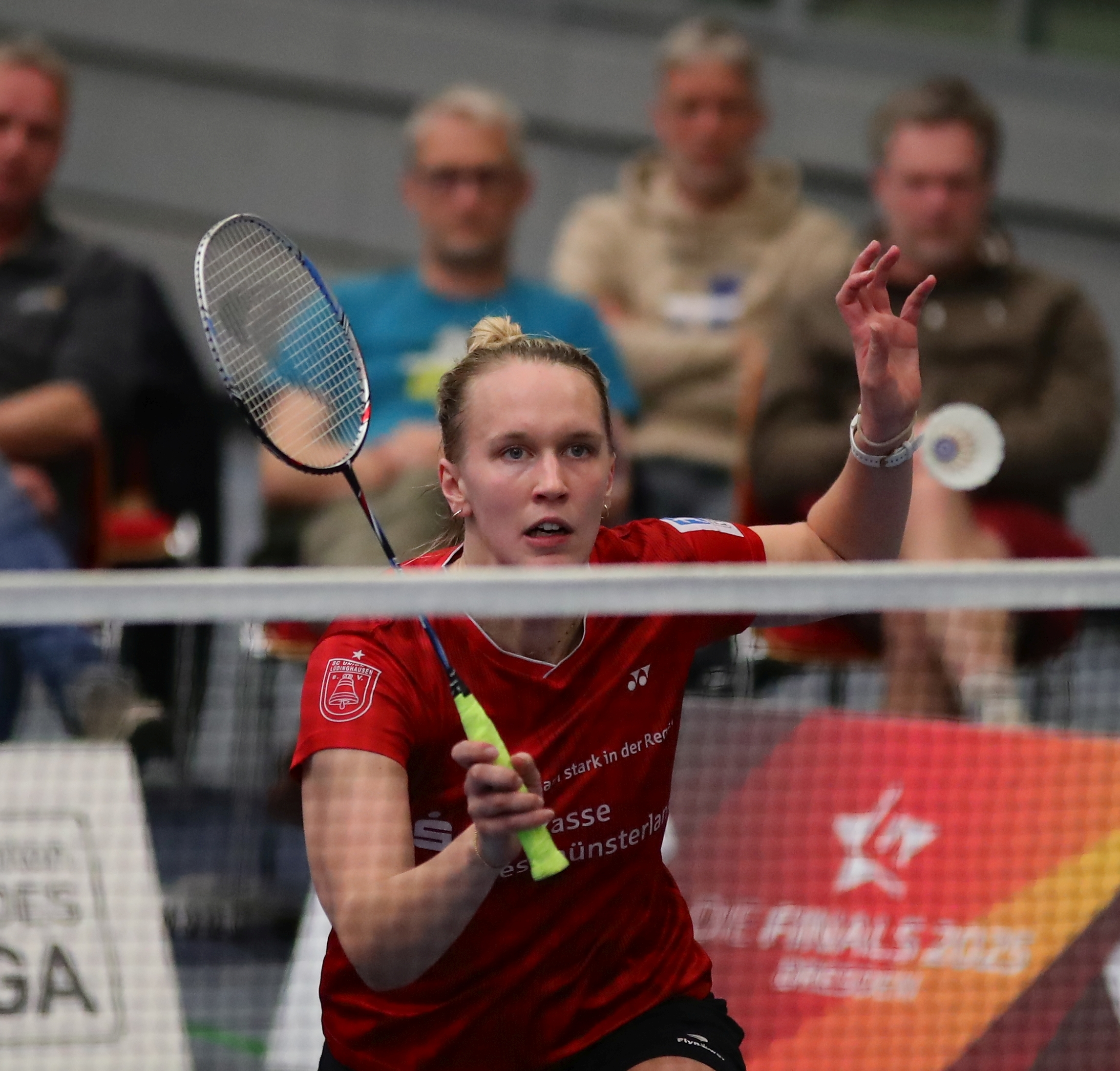

Personal information
- Born: 23 January 1995 (age 31) Emsdetten, North Rhine-Westphalia, Germany
- Height: 1.78 m (5 ft 10 in)

Sport
- Country: Germany
- Sport: Badminton
- Handedness: Right

Women's & mixed doubles
- Highest ranking: 20 (WD with Isabel Lohau, 27 September 2022); 12 (XD with Marvin Seidel, 5 July 2018)
- BWF profile
Medal record
Women's badminton
Representing Germany
European Games
Bronze medal – third place	2023 Kraków–Małopolska	Women's doubles
European Championships
Silver medal – second place	2022 Madrid	Women's doubles
European Mixed Team Championships
Silver medal – second place	2019 Copenhagen	Mixed team
Bronze medal – third place	2017 Lubin	Mixed team
Bronze medal – third place	2021 Vantaa	Mixed team
Bronze medal – third place	2023 Aire-sur-la-Lys	Mixed team
European Women's Team Championships
Silver medal – second place	2018 Kazan	Women's team
Silver medal – second place	2020 Liévin	Women's team
Bronze medal – third place	2014 Basel	Women's team
Bronze medal – third place	2016 Kazan	Women's team

Linda Efler (born 23 January 1995) is a German badminton player who became the member of the national team in 2013. She affiliate with SC Union 08 Lüdinghausen, and won the National Championships women's doubles title in 2019 and 2020, also in the mixed doubles in 2019.

== Achievements ==
=== European Games ===
Women's doubles
Year	Venue	Partner	Opponent	Score	Result
2023	Arena Jaskółka; Tarnów, Poland	(Germany) Isabel Lohau	(Netherlands) Debora Jille (Netherlands) Cheryl Seinen	14–21, 21–19, 17–21	Bronze

=== European Championships ===
Women's doubles
Year	Venue	Partner	Opponent	Score	Result
2022	Polideportivo Municipal Gallur; Madrid, Spain	(Germany) Isabel Lohau	(Bulgaria) Gabriela Stoeva (Bulgaria) Stefani Stoeva	14–21, 10–21	Silver

=== BWF World Tour (2 runners-up) ===
The BWF World Tour, which was announced on 19 March 2017 and implemented in 2018, is a series of elite badminton tournaments sanctioned by the Badminton World Federation (BWF). The BWF World Tours are divided into levels of World Tour Finals, Super 1000, Super 750, Super 500, Super 300 (part of the HSBC World Tour), and the BWF Tour Super 100.

Women's doubles
Year	Tournament	Level	Partner	Opponent	Score	Result
2022	Swiss Open	Super 300	(Germany) Isabel Lohau	(Bulgaria) Gabriela Stoeva (Bulgaria) Stefani Stoeva	14–21, 12–21	(silver) Runner-up

Mixed doubles
Year	Tournament	Level	Partner	Opponent	Score	Result
2018	U.S. Open	Super 300	(Germany) Marvin Seidel	(Malaysia) Chan Peng Soon (Malaysia) Goh Liu Ying	19–21, 15–21	(silver) Runner-up

=== BWF International Challenge/Series (4 titles) ===
Women's doubles
Year	Tournament	Partner	Opponent	Score	Result
2015	Slovenia International	(Germany) Lara Käpplein	(England) Chloe Birch (England) Jenny Wallwork	21–18, 19–21, 21–18	(gold) Winner

Mixed doubles
Year	Tournament	Partner	Opponent	Score	Result
2015	Spanish International	(Germany) Marvin Seidel	(England) Gregory Mairs (England) Jenny Moore	21–16, 21–12	(gold) Winner
2017	White Nights	(Germany) Marvin Seidel	(Germany) Mark Lamsfuß (Germany) Isabel Herttrich	18–21, 21–16, 21–15	(gold) Winner
2022	Ukraine Open	(Germany) Jones Ralfy Jansen	(Germany) Jan Colin Völker (Germany) Stine Küspert	21–12, 21–11	(gold) Winner

BWF International Challenge tournament
BWF International Series tournament
BWF Future Series tournament
