= 2020 BWF World Tour Finals =

2021 badminton tournament in Thailand

Tournament details
- Dates: 27–31 January 2021
- Edition: 3rd
- Level: World Tour Finals
- Total prize money: US$1,500,000
- Venue: Impact Arena
- Location: Pak Kret, Nonthaburi, Thailand

Champions
- Men's singles: (Denmark) Anders Antonsen
- Women's singles: (Chinese Taipei) Tai Tzu-ying
- Men's doubles: (Chinese Taipei) Lee Yang (Chinese Taipei) Wang Chi-lin
- Women's doubles: (South Korea) Lee So-hee (South Korea) Shin Seung-chan
- Mixed doubles: (Thailand) Dechapol Puavaranukroh (Thailand) Sapsiree Taerattanachai

The 2020 BWF World Tour Finals (officially known as the HSBC BWF World Tour Finals 2020 for sponsorship reasons) was the final tournament of the 2020 BWF World Tour. It was held from 27 to 31 January 2021 in Pak Kret, Nonthaburi, Thailand and had a total prize of $1,500,000.

== Tournament ==
The 2020 BWF World Tour Finals was the third edition of the BWF World Tour Finals and was organized by Badminton Association of Thailand with sanction from the BWF. It was the last of three BWF tournaments taking place in Thailand in January 2021, after the Yonex and Toyota Thailand Opens. Participation in both Thailand Opens was mandatory to qualify and the performance during the tournaments were counted for this World Tour Finals, in addition to the 2019 Syed Modi International, 2020 Malaysia Masters, 2020 Indonesia Masters, 2020 Thailand Masters, 2020 Spain Masters, 2020 All England Open, and 2020 Denmark Open.

=== Venue ===
This tournament was held at the Impact Arena in Pak Kret, Nonthaburi, Thailand. It was originally due to be held for the third year in a row at the Tianhe Gymnasium in Guangzhou, China, but was relocated.

=== Point distribution ===
Below is the point distribution for each phase of the tournament based on the BWF points system for the BWF World Tour Finals event.

Winner(s)	Runner(s)-up	Semi-finalists	3rd in group	4th in group
12,000	10,200	8,400	6,600	4,800

=== Prize money ===
The total prize money for this tournament was US$1,500,000. Distribution of prize money was in accordance with BWF regulations.

Achievement	Winner(s)	Runner(s)-up	Semi-finalist(s)	3rd in group	4th in group
Singles	$120,000	$60,000	$30,000	$16,500	$9,000
Doubles	$126,000	$60,000	$30,000	$19,500	$10,500

== Representatives ==
=== Eligible players ===
Below are the eligible players for World Tour Finals. Final ranking used was released on 24 January 2021, and counting the results from the 2019 Syed Modi International.

==== Men's singles ====
Seeds	Rank	NOCs	Players	Performances		
Seeds	Rank	NOCs	Players	Winner(s)	Runner(s)-up	Semi-finalists
1	1	Denmark (1)	Viktor Axelsen	4: Super 1000: All England Open; Super 1000: Thailand Open I Super 1000: Thailand Open II; Super 300: Spain Masters	1: Super 500: Malaysia Masters	1: Super 500: Indonesia Masters
2	2	Denmark (2)	Anders Antonsen	1: Super 750: Denmark Open	1: Super 500: Indonesia Masters	2: Super 1000: All England Open; Super 1000: Thailand Open II
3	3	Chinese Taipei (1)	Chou Tien-chen		1: Super 1000: All England Open	3: Super 1000: Thailand Open I Super 1000: Thailand Open II; Super 750: Denmark Open
4	5	Chinese Taipei (2)	Wang Tzu-wei	1: Super 300: Syed Modi International		
	6	Hong Kong (1)	Ng Ka Long	1: Super 300: Thailand Masters	1: Super 1000: Thailand Open I	1: Super 500: Malaysia Masters
	7	India (1)	Srikanth Kidambi			
	8	Malaysia (1)	Lee Zii Jia			2: Super 1000: All England Open; Super 500: Malaysia Masters
	9	Indonesia (1)	Anthony Sinisuka Ginting	1: Super 500: Indonesia Masters		1: Super 1000: Thailand Open I

==== Women's singles ====
Seeds	Rank	NOCs	Players	Performances		
Seeds	Rank	NOCs	Players	Winner(s)	Runner(s)-up	Semi-finalists
1	1	Spain (1)	Carolina Marín	3: Super 1000: Thailand Open I Super 1000: Thailand Open II; Super 300: Syed Modi International	3: Super 750: Denmark Open; Super 500: Indonesia Masters; Super 300: Spain Masters	3: Super 1000: All England Open; Super 500: Malaysia Masters; Super 300: Thailand Masters
2	2	Chinese Taipei (1)	Tai Tzu-ying	1: Super 1000: All England Open	3: Super 1000: Thailand Open I Super 1000: Thailand Open II; Super 500: Malaysia Masters	
3	3	Thailand (1)	Ratchanok Intanon	1: Super 500: Indonesia Masters		1: Super 1000: Thailand Open II
4	4	South Korea (1)	An Se-young		1: Super 300: Thailand Masters	2: Super 1000: Thailand Open I Super 1000: Thailand Open II
	5	Thailand (2)	Pornpawee Chochuwong	1: Super 300: Spain Masters		
	6	Canada (1)	Michelle Li			1: Super 750: Denmark Open
	9	Russia (1)	Evgeniya Kosetskaya			
	10	India (1)	P. V. Sindhu			

==== Men's doubles ====
Seeds	Rank	NOCs	Players	Performances		
Seeds	Rank	NOCs	Players	Winner(s)	Runner(s)-up	Semi-finalists
1	1	Chinese Taipei (1)	Lee Yang	2: Super 1000: Thailand Open I Super 1000: Thailand Open II	1: Super 300: Spain Masters	1: Super 1000: All England Open
1	1	Chinese Taipei (1)	Wang Chi-lin	2: Super 1000: Thailand Open I Super 1000: Thailand Open II	1: Super 300: Spain Masters	1: Super 1000: All England Open
2	2	Malaysia (1)	Aaron Chia		1: Super 1000: Thailand Open II	2: Super 500: Indonesia Masters; Super 300: Spain Masters
2	2	Malaysia (1)	Soh Wooi Yik		1: Super 1000: Thailand Open II	2: Super 500: Indonesia Masters; Super 300: Spain Masters
3	3	Indonesia (1)	Mohammad Ahsan		1: Super 500: Indonesia Masters	2: Super 1000: Thailand Open II; Super 500: Malaysia Masters
3	3	Indonesia (1)	Hendra Setiawan		1: Super 500: Indonesia Masters	2: Super 1000: Thailand Open II; Super 500: Malaysia Masters
4	4	Malaysia (2)	Ong Yew Sin	1: Super 300: Thailand Masters		
4	4	Malaysia (2)	Teo Ee Yi	1: Super 300: Thailand Masters		
	5	Russia (1)	Vladimir Ivanov		1: Super 750: Denmark Open	1: Super 1000: All England Open
	5	Russia (1)	Ivan Sozonov		1: Super 750: Denmark Open	1: Super 1000: All England Open
	6	England (1)	Marcus Ellis	1: Super 750: Denmark Open		
	6	England (1)	Chris Langridge	1: Super 750: Denmark Open		
	7	England (2)	Ben Lane			1: Super 750: Denmark Open
	7	England (2)	Sean Vendy			1: Super 750: Denmark Open
	8	South Korea (1)	Choi Sol-gyu			1: Super 1000: Thailand Open I
	8	South Korea (1)	Seo Seung-jae			1: Super 1000: Thailand Open I

==== Women's doubles ====
Seeds	Rank	NOCs	Players	Performances		
Seeds	Rank	NOCs	Players	Winner(s)	Runner(s)-up	Semi-finalists
1	1	Indonesia (1)	Greysia Polii	3: Super 1000: Thailand Open I Super 500: Indonesia Masters; Super 300: Spain Masters		2: Super 1000: Thailand Open II; Super 500: Malaysia Masters
1	1	Indonesia (1)	Apriyani Rahayu	3: Super 1000: Thailand Open I Super 500: Indonesia Masters; Super 300: Spain Masters		2: Super 1000: Thailand Open II; Super 500: Malaysia Masters
2	2	South Korea (1)	Kim So-yeong	1: Super 1000: Thailand Open II		3: Super 1000: Thailand Open I Super 500: Indonesia Masters; Super 300: Thailand Masters
2	2	South Korea (1)	Kong Hee-yong	1: Super 1000: Thailand Open II		3: Super 1000: Thailand Open I Super 500: Indonesia Masters; Super 300: Thailand Masters
3	3	South Korea (2)	Lee So-hee		1: Super 1000: Thailand Open II	2: Super 1000: All England Open; Super 1000: Thailand Open I
3	3	South Korea (2)	Shin Seung-chan		1: Super 1000: Thailand Open II	2: Super 1000: All England Open; Super 1000: Thailand Open I
4	5	England (1)	Chloe Birch			1: Super 300: Spain Masters
4	5	England (1)	Lauren Smith			1: Super 300: Spain Masters
	6	Thailand (1)	Jongkolphan Kititharakul		1: Super 1000: Thailand Open I	1: Super 300: Spain Masters
	6	Thailand (1)	Rawinda Prajongjai		1: Super 1000: Thailand Open I	1: Super 300: Spain Masters
	8	Germany (1)	Linda Efler	1: Super 300: Syed Modi International		
	8	Germany (1)	Isabel Herttrich	1: Super 300: Syed Modi International		
	9	Malaysia (1)	Chow Mei Kuan			1: Super 1000: Thailand Open II
	9	Malaysia (1)	Lee Meng Yean			1: Super 1000: Thailand Open II
	10	Malaysia (2)	Vivian Hoo Kah Mun			
	10	Malaysia (2)	Yap Cheng Wen			

==== Mixed doubles ====
Seeds	Rank	NOCs	Players	Performances		
Seeds	Rank	NOCs	Players	Winner(s)	Runner(s)-up	Semi-finalists
1	1	England (1)	Marcus Ellis	1: Super 300: Thailand Masters	1: Super 300: Syed Modi International	2: Super 1000: All England Open; Super 750: Denmark Open
1	1	England (1)	Lauren Smith	1: Super 300: Thailand Masters	1: Super 300: Syed Modi International	2: Super 1000: All England Open; Super 750: Denmark Open
2	2	Germany (1)	Mark Lamsfuß	1: Super 750: Denmark Open		1: Super 300: Syed Modi International
2	2	Germany (1)	Isabel Herttrich	1: Super 750: Denmark Open		1: Super 300: Syed Modi International
3	3	Thailand (1)	Dechapol Puavaranukroh	2: Super 1000: Thailand Open I Super 1000: Thailand Open II	1: Super 1000: All England Open	
3	3	Thailand (1)	Sapsiree Taerattanachai	2: Super 1000: Thailand Open I Super 1000: Thailand Open II	1: Super 1000: All England Open	
4	4	France (1)	Thom Gicquel		1: Super 300: Spain Masters	3: Super 1000: Thailand Open I Super 500: Indonesia Masters; Super 300: Syed Modi International
4	4	France (1)	Delphine Delrue		1: Super 300: Spain Masters	3: Super 1000: Thailand Open I Super 500: Indonesia Masters; Super 300: Syed Modi International
	5	Indonesia (1)	Praveen Jordan	1: Super 1000: All England Open	1: Super 1000: Thailand Open I	
	5	Indonesia (1)	Melati Daeva Oktavianti	1: Super 1000: All England Open	1: Super 1000: Thailand Open I	
	6	South Korea (1)	Seo Seung-jae		1: Super 1000: Thailand Open II	2: Super 1000: All England Open; Super 1000: Thailand Open I
	6	South Korea (1)	Chae Yoo-jung		1: Super 1000: Thailand Open II	2: Super 1000: All England Open; Super 1000: Thailand Open I
	7	Indonesia (2)	Hafiz Faizal		1: Super 300: Thailand Masters	1: Super 500: Malaysia Masters
	7	Indonesia (2)	Gloria Emanuelle Widjaja		1: Super 300: Thailand Masters	1: Super 500: Malaysia Masters
	8	Malaysia (1)	Goh Soon Huat			1: Super 300: Thailand Masters
	8	Malaysia (1)	Shevon Jemie Lai			1: Super 300: Thailand Masters

=== Representatives by nation ===
Top Nations
Rank	Nation	MS	WS	MD	WD	XD	Total	Players
1	Malaysia	1		2	2	1	6	11
2	Indonesia	1		1	1	2	5	9
3	South Korea		1	1	2	1	5	8^{§}
4	England			2	1	1	4	6^{§}
4	Thailand (H)		2		1	1	4	6
6	Chinese Taipei	2	1	1			4	5
7	Russia		1	1			2	3
7	Germany				1	1	2	3^{§}
9	Denmark	2					2	2
9	India	1	1				2	2
11	France					1	1	2
12	Canada		1				1	1
12	Hong Kong	1					1	1
12	Spain		1				1	1
Total (14 NOCs)		8	8	8	8	8	40	60

§: Marcus Ellis from England and Seo Seung-jae from South Korea play in men's and mixed doubles, while Lauren Smith from England and Isabel Herttrich from Germany play in women's and mixed doubles.

== Performance by nation ==
Rank	Nation	Group stage	Semi-finals	Final	Winner(s)
1	Chinese Taipei	4	4	2	2
2	Denmark	2	2	2	1
3	South Korea	5	5	3	1
4	Thailand (H)	4	3	1	1
5	Indonesia	5	1	1	
6	Spain	1	1	1	
7	Malaysia	6	2		
8	England	4	1		
9	France	1	1		
10	Germany	2			
10	India	2			
10	Russia	2			
13	Canada	1			
13	Hong Kong	1			
Total		40	20	10	5

== Men's singles ==
=== Group A ===
Pos	Team	Pld	W	L	GF	GA	GD	PF	PA	PD	Pts	Qualification
1	(Denmark) Viktor Axelsen	3	3	0	6	0	+6	126	68	+58	3	Advance to semi-finals
2	(Chinese Taipei) Chou Tien-chen	3	2	1	4	3	+1	120	120	0	2	Advance to semi-finals
3	(Indonesia) Anthony Sinisuka Ginting	3	1	2	2	5	−3	112	130	−18	1	
4	(Malaysia) Lee Zii Jia	3	0	3	2	6	−4	113	153	−40	0	

Source: TS

Date		Score		Set 1	Set 2	Set 3
27 Jan	Chou Tien-chen (Chinese Taipei)	2–1	(Malaysia) Lee Zii Jia	21–16	12–21	21–11
27 Jan	Viktor Axelsen (Denmark)	2–0	(Indonesia) Anthony Sinisuka Ginting	21–17	21–8	
28 Jan	Chou Tien-chen (Chinese Taipei)	2–0	(Indonesia) Anthony Sinisuka Ginting	21–19	21–11	
28 Jan	Viktor Axelsen (Denmark)	2–0	(Malaysia) Lee Zii Jia	21–15	21–4	
29 Jan	Lee Zii Jia (Malaysia)	1–2	(Indonesia) Anthony Sinisuka Ginting	12–21	21–15	13–21
29 Jan	Viktor Axelsen (Denmark)	2–0	(Chinese Taipei) Chou Tien-chen	21–10	21–14	

=== Group B ===
Pos	Team	Pld	W	L	GF	GA	GD	PF	PA	PD	Pts	Qualification
1	(Chinese Taipei) Wang Tzu-wei	3	3	0	6	1	+5	145	103	+42	3	Advance to Semi-finals
2	(Denmark) Anders Antonsen	3	2	1	4	3	+1	129	132	−3	2	Advance to Semi-finals
3	(Hong Kong) Ng Ka Long	3	1	2	2	5	−3	113	142	−29	1	
4	(India) Srikanth Kidambi	3	0	3	3	6	−3	162	172	−10	0	

Source: TS

Date		Score		Set 1	Set 2	Set 3
27 Jan	Wang Tzu-wei (Chinese Taipei)	2–0	(Hong Kong) Ng Ka Long	21–10	21–14	
27 Jan	Anders Antonsen (Denmark)	2–1	(India) Srikanth Kidambi	15–21	21–16	21–18
28 Jan	Anders Antonsen (Denmark)	2–0	(Hong Kong) Ng Ka Long	21–19	21–16	
28 Jan	Wang Tzu-wei (Chinese Taipei)	2–1	(India) Srikanth Kidambi	19–21	21–9	21–19
29 Jan	Ng Ka Long (Hong Kong)	2–1	(India) Srikanth Kidambi	12–21	21–18	21–19
29 Jan	Anders Antonsen (Denmark)	0–2	(Chinese Taipei) Wang Tzu-wei	11–21	19–21	

=== Finals ===
Semi-finals
(Denmark) Viktor Axelsen	21	21
(Chinese Taipei) Chou Tien-chen	16	9
(Denmark) Anders Antonsen	21	14	21
(Chinese Taipei) Wang Tzu-wei	18	21	16

Final
(Denmark) Viktor Axelsen	16	21	17
(Denmark) Anders Antonsen	21	5	21

== Women's singles ==
=== Group A ===
Pos	Team	Pld	W	L	GF	GA	GD	PF	PA	PD	Pts	Qualification
1	(South Korea) An Se-young	3	3	0	6	1	+5	140	115	+25	3	Advance to semi-finals
2	(Spain) Carolina Marín	3	2	1	5	2	+3	140	118	+22	2	Advance to semi-finals
3	(Russia) Evgeniya Kosetskaya	3	1	2	2	4	−2	109	117	−8	1	
4	(Canada) Michelle Li	3	0	3	0	6	−6	91	130	−39	0	

Source: TS

Date		Score		Set 1	Set 2	Set 3
27 Jan	An Se-young (South Korea)	2–0	(Canada) Michelle Li	21–12	21–17	
27 Jan	Carolina Marín (Spain)	2–0	(Russia) Evgeniya Kosetskaya	21–19	21–14	
28 Jan	Carolina Marín (Spain)	2–0	(Canada) Michelle Li	21–16	21–13	
28 Jan	An Se-young (South Korea)	2–0	(Russia) Evgeniya Kosetskaya	21–13	21–17	
29 Jan	Carolina Marín (Spain)	1–2	(South Korea) An Se-young	16–21	21–14	19–21
29 Jan	Michelle Li (Canada)	0–2	(Russia) Evgeniya Kosetskaya	23–25	10–21	

=== Group B ===
Pos	Team	Pld	W	L	GF	GA	GD	PF	PA	PD	Pts	Qualification
1	(Thailand) Pornpawee Chochuwong	3	2	1	4	3	+1	132	120	+12	2	Advance to semi-finals
2	(Chinese Taipei) Tai Tzu-ying	3	2	1	4	4	0	154	138	+16	2	Advance to semi-finals
3	(Thailand) Ratchanok Intanon	3	1	2	4	4	0	138	153	−15	1	
4	(India) P. V. Sindhu	3	1	2	3	4	−1	123	136	−13	1	

Source: TS

Date		Score		Set 1	Set 2	Set 3
27 Jan	Tai Tzu-ying (Chinese Taipei)	2–1	(India) P. V. Sindhu	19–21	21–12	21–17
27 Jan	Ratchanok Intanon (Thailand)	1–2	(Thailand) Pornpawee Chochuwong	21–15	11–21	18–21
28 Jan	Ratchanok Intanon (Thailand)	2–0	(India) P. V. Sindhu	21–18	21–13	
28 Jan	Tai Tzu-ying (Chinese Taipei)	0–2	(Thailand) Pornpawee Chochuwong	17–21	11–21	
29 Jan	Pornpawee Chochuwong (Thailand)	0–2	(India) P. V. Sindhu	18–21	15–21	
29 Jan	Tai Tzu-ying (Chinese Taipei)	2–1	(Thailand) Ratchanok Intanon	23–25	21–12	21–9

=== Finals ===
Semi-finals
(South Korea) An Se-young	18	12
(Chinese Taipei) Tai Tzu-ying	21	21
(Spain) Carolina Marín	21	21
(Thailand) Pornpawee Chochuwong	13	13

Final
(Chinese Taipei) Tai Tzu-ying	14	21	21
(Spain) Carolina Marín	21	8	19

== Men's doubles ==
=== Group A ===
Pos	Team	Pld	W	L	GF	GA	GD	PF	PA	PD	Pts	Qualification
1	(Chinese Taipei) Lee Yang (Chinese Taipei) Wang Chi-lin	3	3	0	6	0	+6	129	102	+27	3	Advance to semi-finals
2	(England) Ben Lane (England) Sean Vendy	3	2	1	4	2	+2	117	105	+12	2	Advance to semi-finals
3	(Malaysia) Ong Yew Sin (Malaysia) Teo Ee Yi	3	1	2	2	4	−2	110	124	−14	1	
4	(England) Marcus Ellis (England) Chris Langridge	3	0	3	0	6	−6	102	127	−25	0	

Source: TS

Date		Score		Set 1	Set 2	Set 3
27 Jan	Marcus Ellis (England); Chris Langridge (England)	0–2	(England) Ben Lane (England) Sean Vendy	20–22	15–21	
27 Jan	Lee Yang (Chinese Taipei); Wang Chi-lin (Chinese Taipei)	2–0	(Malaysia) Ong Yew Sin (Malaysia) Teo Ee Yi	21–18	24–22	
28 Jan	Lee Yang (Chinese Taipei); Wang Chi-lin (Chinese Taipei)	2–0	(England) Ben Lane (England) Sean Vendy	21–14	21–18	
28 Jan	Ong Yew Sin (Malaysia); Teo Ee Yi (Malaysia)	2–0	(England) Marcus Ellis (England) Chris Langridge	21–19	21–18	
29 Jan	Lee Yang (Chinese Taipei); Wang Chi-lin (Chinese Taipei)	2–0	(England) Marcus Ellis (England) Chris Langridge	21–17	21–13	
29 Jan	Ong Yew Sin (Malaysia); Teo Ee Yi (Malaysia)	0–2	(England) Ben Lane (England) Sean Vendy	15–21	13–21	

=== Group B ===
Pos	Team	Pld	W	L	GF	GA	GD	PF	PA	PD	Pts	Qualification
1	(South Korea) Choi Sol-gyu (South Korea) Seo Seung-jae	3	2	1	4	3	+1	134	125	+9	2	Advance to semi-finals
2	(Indonesia) Mohammad Ahsan (Indonesia) Hendra Setiawan	3	2	1	4	4	0	152	147	+5	2	Advance to semi-finals
3	(Russia) Vladimir Ivanov (Russia) Ivan Sozonov	3	1	2	4	4	0	146	151	−5	1	
4	(Malaysia) Aaron Chia (Malaysia) Soh Wooi Yik	3	1	2	3	4	−1	126	135	−9	1	

Source: TS

Date		Score		Set 1	Set 2	Set 3
27 Jan	Mohammad Ahsan (Indonesia); Hendra Setiawan (Indonesia)	2–1	(Russia) Vladimir Ivanov (Russia) Ivan Sozonov	21–18	15–21	21–17
27 Jan	Aaron Chia (Malaysia); Soh Wooi Yik (Malaysia)	2–0	(South Korea) Choi Sol-gyu (South Korea) Seo Seung-jae	21–14	21–19	
28 Jan	Aaron Chia (Malaysia); Soh Wooi Yik (Malaysia)	0–2	(Russia) Vladimir Ivanov (Russia) Ivan Sozonov	19–21	16–21	
28 Jan	Mohammad Ahsan (Indonesia); Hendra Setiawan (Indonesia)	0–2	(South Korea) Choi Sol-gyu (South Korea) Seo Seung-jae	19–21	16–21	
29 Jan	Aaron Chia (Malaysia); Soh Wooi Yik (Malaysia)	1–2	(Indonesia) Mohammad Ahsan (Indonesia) Hendra Setiawan	21–18	17–21	11–21
29 Jan	Vladimir Ivanov (Russia); Ivan Sozonov (Russia)	1–2	(South Korea) Choi Sol-gyu (South Korea) Seo Seung-jae	11–21	21–17	16–21

=== Finals ===
Semi-finals
(Chinese Taipei) Lee Yang (Chinese Taipei) Wang Chi-lin	22	21
(England) Ben Lane (England) Sean Vendy	20	17
(Indonesia) Mohammad Ahsan (Indonesia) Hendra Setiawan	23	21
(South Korea) Choi Sol-gyu (South Korea) Seo Seung-jae	21	13

Final
(Chinese Taipei) Lee Yang (Chinese Taipei) Wang Chi-lin	21	23
(Indonesia) Mohammad Ahsan (Indonesia) Hendra Setiawan	17	21

== Women's doubles ==
=== Group A ===
Pos	Team	Pld	W	L	GF	GA	GD	PF	PA	PD	Pts	Qualification
1	(South Korea) Lee So-hee (South Korea) Shin Seung-chan	3	2	1	5	2	+3	140	124	+16	2	Advance to semi-finals
2	(Malaysia) Chow Mei Kuan (Malaysia) Lee Meng Yean	3	2	1	4	3	+1	126	124	+2	2	Advance to semi-finals
3	(Indonesia) Greysia Polii (Indonesia) Apriyani Rahayu	3	2	1	4	3	+1	136	122	+14	2	
4	(Malaysia) Vivian Hoo Kah Mun (Malaysia) Yap Cheng Wen	3	0	3	1	6	−5	104	136	−32	0	

Source: TS

Date		Score		Set 1	Set 2	Set 3
27 Jan	Chow Mei Kuan (Malaysia); Lee Meng Yean (Malaysia)	2–1	(Malaysia) Vivian Hoo Kah Mun (Malaysia) Yap Cheng Wen	21–16	10–21	21–15
27 Jan	Greysia Polii (Indonesia); Apriyani Rahayu (Indonesia)	2–1	(South Korea) Lee So-hee (South Korea) Shin Seung-chan	21–17	22–24	21–15
28 Jan	Lee So-hee (South Korea); Shin Seung-chan (South Korea)	2–0	(Malaysia) Chow Mei Kuan (Malaysia) Lee Meng Yean	21–15	21–17	
28 Jan	Greysia Polii (Indonesia); Apriyani Rahayu (Indonesia)	2–0	(Malaysia) Vivian Hoo Kah Mun (Malaysia) Yap Cheng Wen	21–17	21–7	
29 Jan	Lee So-hee (South Korea); Shin Seung-chan (South Korea)	2–0	(Malaysia) Vivian Hoo Kah Mun (Malaysia) Yap Cheng Wen	21–12	21–16	
29 Jan	Greysia Polii (Indonesia); Apriyani Rahayu (Indonesia)	0–2	(Malaysia) Chow Mei Kuan (Malaysia) Lee Meng Yean	13–21	17–21	

=== Group B ===
Pos	Team	Pld	W	L	GF	GA	GD	PF	PA	PD	Pts	Qualification
1	(South Korea) Kim So-yeong (South Korea) Kong Hee-yong	3	3	0	6	1	+5	145	101	+44	3	Advance to semi-finals
2	(Thailand) Jongkolphan Kititharakul (Thailand) Rawinda Prajongjai	3	2	1	4	2	+2	110	90	+20	2	Advance to semi-finals
3	(England) Chloe Birch (England) Lauren Smith	3	1	2	2	5	−3	115	134	−19	1	
4	(Germany) Linda Efler (Germany) Isabel Herttrich	3	0	3	2	6	−4	120	165	−45	0	

Source: TS

Date		Score		Set 1	Set 2	Set 3
27 Jan	Chloe Birch (England); Lauren Smith (England)	0–2	(Thailand) Jongkolphan Kititharakul (Thailand) Rawinda Prajongjai	10–21	11–21	
27 Jan	Kim So-yeong (South Korea); Kong Hee-yong (South Korea)	2–1	(Germany) Linda Efler (Germany) Isabel Herttrich	21–11	19–21	21–11
28 Jan	Chloe Birch (England); Lauren Smith (England)	2–1	(Germany) Linda Efler (Germany) Isabel Herttrich	20–22	21–16	21–12
28 Jan	Kim So-yeong (South Korea); Kong Hee-yong (South Korea)	2–0	(Thailand) Jongkolphan Kititharakul (Thailand) Rawinda Prajongjai	21–12	21–14	
29 Jan	Kim So-yeong (South Korea); Kong Hee-yong (South Korea)	2–0	(England) Chloe Birch (England) Lauren Smith	21–14	21–18	
29 Jan	Jongkolphan Kititharakul (Thailand); Rawinda Prajongjai (Thailand)	2–0	(Germany) Linda Efler (Germany) Isabel Herttrich	21–13	21–14	

=== Finals ===
Semi-finals
(South Korea) Lee So-hee (South Korea) Shin Seung-chan	21	21
(Malaysia) Chow Mei Kuan (Malaysia) Lee Meng Yean	14	15
(Thailand) Jongkolphan Kititharakul (Thailand) Rawinda Prajongjai	11	21	16
(South Korea) Kim So-yeong (South Korea) Kong Hee-yong	21	12	21

Final
(South Korea) Lee So-hee (South Korea) Shin Seung-chan	15	26	21
(South Korea) Kim So-yeong (South Korea) Kong Hee-yong	21	24	19

== Mixed doubles ==
=== Group A ===
Pos	Team	Pld	W	L	GF	GA	GD	PF	PA	PD	Pts	Qualification
1	(South Korea) Seo Seung-jae (South Korea) Chae Yoo-jung	3	3	0	6	0	+6	126	81	+45	3	Advance to semi-finals
2	(Thailand) Dechapol Puavaranukroh (Thailand) Sapsiree Taerattanachai	3	2	1	4	3	+1	134	110	+24	2	Advance to semi-finals
3	(Indonesia) Praveen Jordan (Indonesia) Melati Daeva Oktavianti	3	1	2	3	4	−1	111	139	−28	1	
4	(England) Marcus Ellis (England) Lauren Smith	3	0	3	0	6	−6	86	127	−41	0	

Source: TS

Date		Score		Set 1	Set 2	Set 3
27 Jan	Marcus Ellis (England); Lauren Smith (England)	0–2	(South Korea) Seo Seung-jae (South Korea) Chae Yoo-jung	12–21	12–21	
27 Jan	Dechapol Puavaranukroh (Thailand); Sapsiree Taerattanachai (Thailand)	2–1	(Indonesia) Praveen Jordan (Indonesia) Melati Daeva Oktavianti	21–13	16–21	21–11
28 Jan	Dechapol Puavaranukroh (Thailand); Sapsiree Taerattanachai (Thailand)	0–2	(South Korea) Seo Seung-jae (South Korea) Chae Yoo-jung	17–21	17–21	
28 Jan	Marcus Ellis (England); Lauren Smith (England)	0–2	(Indonesia) Praveen Jordan (Indonesia) Melati Daeva Oktavianti	20–22	19–21	
29 Jan	Praveen Jordan (Indonesia); Melati Daeva Oktavianti (Indonesia)	0–2	(South Korea) Seo Seung-jae (South Korea) Chae Yoo-jung	10–21	13–21	
29 Jan	Marcus Ellis (England); Lauren Smith (England)	0–2	(Thailand) Dechapol Puavaranukroh (Thailand) Sapsiree Taerattanachai	12–21	11–21	

=== Group B ===
Pos	Team	Pld	W	L	GF	GA	GD	PF	PA	PD	Pts	Qualification
1	(France) Thom Gicquel (France) Delphine Delrue	3	3	0	6	1	+5	140	103	+37	3	Advance to semi-finals
2	(Malaysia) Goh Soon Huat (Malaysia) Shevon Jemie Lai	3	2	1	4	4	0	141	146	−5	2	Advance to semi-finals
3	(Indonesia) Hafiz Faizal (Indonesia) Gloria Emanuelle Widjaja	3	1	2	4	5	−1	157	171	−14	1	
4	(Germany) Mark Lamsfuß (Germany) Isabel Herttrich	3	0	3	2	6	−4	138	156	−18	0	

Source: TS

Date		Score		Set 1	Set 2	Set 3
27 Jan	Thom Gicquel (France); Delphine Delrue (France)	2–1	(Indonesia) Hafiz Faizal (Indonesia) Gloria Emanuelle Widjaja	14–21	21–14	21–17
27 Jan	Mark Lamsfuß (Germany); Isabel Herttrich (Germany)	1–2	(Malaysia) Goh Soon Huat (Malaysia) Shevon Jemie Lai	21–14	18–21	18–21
28 Jan	Thom Gicquel (France); Delphine Delrue (France)	2–0	(Malaysia) Goh Soon Huat (Malaysia) Shevon Jemie Lai	21–17	21–9	
28 Jan	Mark Lamsfuß (Germany); Isabel Herttrich (Germany)	1–2	(Indonesia) Hafiz Faizal (Indonesia) Gloria Emanuelle Widjaja	21–15	20–22	15–21
29 Jan	Hafiz Faizal (Indonesia); Gloria Emanuelle Widjaja (Indonesia)	1–2	(Malaysia) Goh Soon Huat (Malaysia) Shevon Jemie Lai	21–17	13–21	13–21
29 Jan	Mark Lamsfuß (Germany); Isabel Herttrich (Germany)	0–2	(France) Thom Gicquel (France) Delphine Delrue	10–21	15–21	

=== Finals ===
Semi-finals
(South Korea) Seo Seung-jae (South Korea) Chae Yoo-jung	21	21
(Malaysia) Goh Soon Huat (Malaysia) Shevon Jemie Lai	19	8
(Thailand) Dechapol Puavaranukroh (Thailand) Sapsiree Taerattanachai	21	21
(France) Thom Gicquel (France) Delphine Delrue	15	17

Final
(South Korea) Seo Seung-jae (South Korea) Chae Yoo-jung	18	21	8
(Thailand) Dechapol Puavaranukroh (Thailand) Sapsiree Taerattanachai	21	8	21

Preceded by 2020 Toyota Thailand Open	BWF World Tour; 2020 BWF season	Succeeded by 2021 Swiss Open
