= 2020 Toyota Thailand Open =

2021 badminton tournament in Thailand

Toyota Thailand Open

Tournament details
- Dates: 19–24 January 2021
- Level: Super 1000
- Total prize money: US$1,000,000
- Venue: Impact Arena
- Location: Pak Kret, Nonthaburi, Thailand

Champions
- Men's singles: (Denmark) Viktor Axelsen
- Women's singles: (Spain) Carolina Marín
- Men's doubles: (Chinese Taipei) Lee Yang (Chinese Taipei) Wang Chi-lin
- Women's doubles: (South Korea) Kim So-yeong (South Korea) Kong Hee-yong
- Mixed doubles: (Thailand) Dechapol Puavaranukroh (Thailand) Sapsiree Taerattanachai

The Toyota Thailand Open (Note: Although the tournament took place in 2021, it was part of the 2020 BWF World Tour and the BWF referred to it as the Toyota Thailand Open 2020.) was a badminton tournament that took place at the Impact Arena in Thailand from 19 to 24 January 2021. It had a total purse of $1,000,000.

== Tournament ==
The Toyota Thailand Open was the ninth tournament of the 2020 BWF World Tour and also part of the Thailand Open championships, which had been held since 1984. This tournament was organized by Badminton Association of Thailand and sanctioned by the BWF. It was the second of three BWF tournaments taking place in Thailand in January 2021 following a break caused by the COVID-19 pandemic. Participation in both Thailand Opens was mandatory to qualify for the 2020 BWF World Tour Finals.

Four out of five world number ones withdrew from all three tournaments. The Chinese team withdrew from all three tournaments after failing to get permission to travel to Thailand; affected players include Chen Qingchen and Jia Yifan (women's doubles), and Zheng Siwei and Huang Yaqiong (mixed doubles). In addition, the Japanese team has withdrawn from the tournaments following the positive COVID-19 diagnosis of Kento Momota (men's singles). Following Kevin Sanjaya Sukamuljo's positive COVID-19 diagnosis, he and Marcus Fernaldi Gideon (men's doubles) withdrew from the tournaments. Indian men's singles players B. Sai Praneeth and Kidambi Srikanth had to pull out after Praneeth's positive COVID-19 diagnosis.

=== Venue ===
This international tournament was held at the Impact Arena in Pak Kret, Nonthaburi, Thailand.

=== Point distribution ===
Below is the point distribution for each phase of the tournament based on the BWF points system for the BWF World Tour Super 1000 event.

Winner	Runner-up	3/4	5/8	9/16	17/32
12,000	10,200	8,400	6,600	4,800	3,000

=== Prize money ===
The total prize money for this tournament was US$1,000,000. Distribution of prize money was in accordance with BWF regulations.

Event	Winner	Finals	Semi-finals	Quarter-finals	Last 16	Last 32
Singles	$70,000	$34,400	$14,000	$5,500	$3,000	$1,000
Doubles	$74,000	$35,000	$14,000	$6,250	$3,250	$1,000

== Men's singles ==
=== Seeds ===
1. (Japan) Kento Momota (withdrew)
2. (Chinese Taipei) Chou Tien-chen (semi-finals)
3. (Denmark) Anders Antonsen (semi-finals)
4. (Denmark) Viktor Axelsen (champion)
5. (Indonesia) Anthony Sinisuka Ginting (second round)
6. (Indonesia) Jonatan Christie (first round)
7. (Hong Kong) Ng Ka Long (second round)
8. (Malaysia) Lee Zii Jia (first round)

=== Finals ===
Semi-finals
PFR	(Denmark) Hans-Kristian Vittinghus	21	21
3	(Denmark) Anders Antonsen	19	8
4	(Denmark) Viktor Axelsen	21	21
2	(Chinese Taipei) Chou Tien-chen	19	15

Final
PFR	(Denmark) Hans-Kristian Vittinghus	11	7
4	(Denmark) Viktor Axelsen	21	21

=== Top half ===
==== Section 1 ====
First Round
PFR	(Spain) L E Peñalver	11	13
PFR	(Denmark) H-K Vittinghus	21	21
(Indonesia) S H Rhustavito	21	21
(Thailand) K Phetpradab	13	13
5	(Indonesia) A S Ginting	21	21
(India) So Verma	16	11
(Netherlands) M Caljouw	21	23	20
(Hong Kong) Lee C Y	13	25	22

Second Round
PFR	(Denmark) H-K Vittinghus	11	21	21
(Indonesia) S H Rhustavito	21	15	17
5	(Indonesia) A S Ginting	19	21	12
(Hong Kong) Lee C Y	21	13	21

Quarter-finals
PFR	(Denmark) H-K Vittinghus	20	21	21
(Hong Kong) Lee C Y	22	12	19

==== Section 2 ====
First Round
3	(Denmark) A Antonsen	21	21
(Thailand) T Saensomboonsuk	8	8
(India) S Kidambi	21	21
(Thailand) S Thammasin	11	11
8	(Malaysia) Lee Z J	21	25	19
(India) Sa Verma	18	27	21
(India) Parupalli K	0^{r}
(Denmark) R Gemke	3

Second Round
3	(Denmark) A Antonsen	w	/	o
(India) S Kidambi
(India) Sa Verma	21	21
(Denmark) R Gemke	12	9

Quarter-finals
3	(Denmark) A Antonsen	21	19	22
(India) Sa Verma	13	21	20

=== Bottom half ===
==== Section 3 ====
First Round
(Malaysia) Liew D	w	/	o
(India) B. Sai Praneeth
(India) Prannoy K	18	21	23
6	(Indonesia) J Christie	21	16	21
(Singapore) Loh K Y	21	16	10
(Thailand) K Vitidsarn	14	21	21
PFR	(Canada) J Ho-Shue	9	8
4	(Denmark) V Axelsen	21	21

Second Round
(Malaysia) Liew D	21	21
(India) Prannoy K	17	18
(Thailand) K Vitidsarn	11	13
4	(Denmark) V Axelsen	21	21

Quarter-finals
(Malaysia) Liew D	16	15
4	(Denmark) V Axelsen	21	21

==== Section 4 ====
First Round
(South Korea) Heo K-h	18	12
(Chinese Taipei) Wang T-w	21	21
(Thailand) K Wangcharoen	20	12
7	(Hong Kong) Ng K L	22	21
(France) B Leverdez	21	21
PFR	(New Zealand) A Manota	14	10
PFR	(Thailand) S Avihingsanon	16	4
2	(Chinese Taipei) Chou T-c	21	21

Second Round
(Chinese Taipei) Wang T-w	21	21
7	(Hong Kong) Ng K L	13	11
(France) B Leverdez	19	16
2	(Chinese Taipei) Chou T-c	21	21

Quarter-finals
(Chinese Taipei) Wang T-w	16	16
2	(Chinese Taipei) Chou T-c	21	21

== Women's singles ==
=== Seeds ===
1. (Chinese Taipei) Tai Tzu-ying (final)
2. (Japan) Akane Yamaguchi (withdrew)
3. (Japan) Nozomi Okuhara (withdrew)
4. (Thailand) Ratchanok Intanon (semi-finals)
5. (Spain) Carolina Marín (champion)
6. (India) P. V. Sindhu (quarter-finals)
7. (South Korea) An Se-young (semi-finals)
8. (Canada) Michelle Li (quarter-finals)

=== Finals ===
Semi-finals
1	(Chinese Taipei) Tai Tzu-ying	12	21	23
4	(Thailand) Ratchanok Intanon	21	12	21
5	(Spain) Carolina Marín	21	21
7	(South Korea) An Se-young	19	15

Final
1	(Chinese Taipei) Tai Tzu-ying	19	17
5	(Spain) Carolina Marín	21	21

=== Top half ===
==== Section 1 ====
First Round
1	(Chinese Taipei) Tai T-y	21	21
(Thailand) S Katethong	16	11
(Indonesia) G M Tunjung	21	21
PFR	(Thailand) S Roongpiboonsopit	9	8
8	(Canada) M Li	21	16	21
(Hong Kong) Cheung N Y	16	21	19
(United States) I Wang	12	22	21
(South Korea) Kim G-e	21	20	15

Second Round
1	(Chinese Taipei) Tai T-y	22	21
(Indonesia) G M Tunjung	20	16
8	(Canada) M Li	21	21
(United States) I Wang	17	18

Quarter-finals
1	(Chinese Taipei) Tai T-y	18	21	21
8	(Canada) M Li	21	13	11

==== Section 2 ====
First Round
4	(Thailand) R Intanon	21	21
(India) S Nehwal	17	8
(South Korea) Sung J-h	21	21
(Malaysia) S Cheah S Y	9	14
6	(India) P. V. Sindhu	21	21
(Thailand) B Ongbamrungphan	17	13
PFR	(Egypt) D Hany	10	7
PFR	(Malaysia) Kisona S	21	21

Second Round
4	(Thailand) R Intanon	19	24	21
(South Korea) Sung J-h	21	22	17
6	(India) P. V. Sindhu	21	21
PFR	(Malaysia) Kisona S	10	12

Quarter-finals
4	(Thailand) R Intanon	21	21
6	(India) P. V. Sindhu	13	9

=== Bottom half ===
==== Section 3 ====
First Round
(Denmark) L Kjærsfeldt	w	/	o
(Denmark) M Blichfeldt
(France) Qi XF	9	18
5	(Spain) C Marín	21	21
(Switzerland) S Jaquet	13	18
(Turkey) N Yiğit	21	21
(Germany) Y Li	21	16	21
PFR	(Thailand) N Roongpiboonsopit	10	21	14

Second Round
(Denmark) L Kjærsfeldt	19	16
5	(Spain) C Marín	21	21
(Turkey) N Yiğit	21	20	21
(Germany) Y Li	19	22	14

Quarter-finals
5	(Spain) C Marín	21	21
(Turkey) N Yiğit	6	15

==== Section 4 ====
First Round
(Indonesia) R Hartawan	20	18
(Singapore) Yeo J M	22	21
(Thailand) P Chaiwan	12	8
7	(South Korea) An S-y	21	21
(Russia) E Kosetskaya	15	21	19
PFR	(Thailand) B Aimsaard	21	17	21
(Thailand) P Chochuwong	21	21
PFR	(Egypt) H Hosny	6	7

Second Round
(Singapore) Yeo J M	15	7
7	(South Korea) An S-y	21	21
PFR	(Thailand) B Aimsaard	18	14
(Thailand) P Chochuwong	21	21

Quarter-finals
7	(South Korea) An S-y	21	21
(Thailand) P Chochuwong	15	18

== Men's doubles ==
=== Seeds ===
1. (Indonesia) Marcus Fernaldi Gideon / Kevin Sanjaya Sukamuljo (withdrew)
2. (Indonesia) Mohammad Ahsan / Hendra Setiawan (semi-finals)
3. (Japan) Takeshi Kamura / Keigo Sonoda (withdrew)
4. (Japan) Hiroyuki Endo / Yuta Watanabe (withdrew)
5. (Indonesia) Fajar Alfian / Muhammad Rian Ardianto (first round)
6. (Chinese Taipei) Lee Yang / Wang Chi-lin (champions)
7. (South Korea) Choi Sol-gyu / Seo Seung-jae (second round)
8. (Malaysia) Aaron Chia / Soh Wooi Yik (final)

=== Finals ===
Semi-finals
(India) Satwiksairaj Rankireddy (India) Chirag Shetty	18	18
8	(Malaysia) Aaron Chia (Malaysia) Soh Wooi Yik	21	21
6	(Chinese Taipei) Lee Yang (Chinese Taipei) Wang Chi-lin	14	22	21
2	(Indonesia) Mohammad Ahsan (Indonesia) Hendra Setiawan	21	20	12

Final
8	(Malaysia) Aaron Chia (Malaysia) Soh Wooi Yik	13	18
6	(Chinese Taipei) Lee Yang (Chinese Taipei) Wang Chi-lin	21	21

=== Top half ===
==== Section 1 ====
First Round
PFR	(Denmark) M Christiansen (Denmark) N Nøhr	21	11
(Thailand) B Isara (Thailand) M Jongjit	9	8^{r}
(Malaysia) Ong Y S (Malaysia) Teo E Y	19	21	21
(Thailand) N Phuangphuapet (Thailand) T Viriyangkura	21	13	19
7	(South Korea) Choi S-g (South Korea) Seo S-j	15	21	21
(South Korea) Ko S-h (South Korea) Shin B-c	21	15	17
(India) M Attri (India) B. S Reddy	20	26
(India) S Rankireddy (India) C Shetty	22	28

Second Round
PFR	(Denmark) M Christiansen (Denmark) N Nøhr	21	7	17
(Malaysia) Ong Y S (Malaysia) Teo E Y	8	21	21
7	(South Korea) Choi S-g (South Korea) Seo S-j	18	21
(India) S Rankireddy (India) C Shetty	21	23

Quarter-finals
(Malaysia) Ong Y S (Malaysia) Teo E Y	18	22
(India) S Rankireddy (India) C Shetty	21	24

==== Section 2 ====
First Round
PFR	(Thailand) S Jomkoh (Thailand) K Kedren	13	21	21
(Malaysia) Goh S F (Malaysia) N Izzuddin	21	13	17
(Malaysia) Goh V S (Malaysia) Tan W K	6
(South Korea) Kim G-j (South Korea) Lee Y-d	2^{r}
8	(Malaysia) A Chia (Malaysia) Soh W Y	21	21
PFR	(Thailand) W Phakjarung (Thailand) W Thongkham	10	18
(Denmark) K Astrup (Denmark) A S Rasmussen	21	15	19
(Indonesia) L R Carnando (Indonesia) D Marthin	17	21	21

Second Round
PFR	(Thailand) S Jomkoh (Thailand) K Kedren	15	21	15
(Malaysia) Goh V S (Malaysia) Tan W K	21	16	21
8	(Malaysia) A Chia (Malaysia) Soh W Y	21	6	21
(Indonesia) L R Carnando (Indonesia) D Marthin	12	21	12

Quarter-finals
(Malaysia) Goh V S (Malaysia) Tan W K	16	13
8	(Malaysia) A Chia (Malaysia) Soh W Y	21	21

=== Bottom half ===
==== Section 3 ====
First Round
(Canada) J Ho-Shue (Canada) N Yakura	21	22
PFR	(Germany) D Hess (Germany) J R Jansen	15	20
(United States) P Chew (United States) R Chew	14	11
6	(Chinese Taipei) Lee Y (Chinese Taipei) Wang C-l	21	21
(Indonesia) M S Fikri (Indonesia) B Maulana	21	16	21
(Russia) V Ivanov (Russia) I Sozonov	15	21	13
(Germany) M Lamsfuß (Germany) M E Seidel	21	21
PFR	(Thailand) A Gaterahong (Thailand) N Tulamok	14	11

Second Round
(Canada) J Ho-Shue (Canada) N Yakura	15	5
6	(Chinese Taipei) Lee Y (Chinese Taipei) Wang C-l	21	21
(Indonesia) M S Fikri (Indonesia) B Maulana	16	15
(Germany) M Lamsfuß (Germany) M E Seidel	21	21

Quarter-finals
6	(Chinese Taipei) Lee Y (Chinese Taipei) Wang C-l	21	21
(Germany) M Lamsfuß (Germany) M E Seidel	14	12

==== Section 4 ====
First Round
(New Zealand) O Leydon-Davis (New Zealand) A Manota	21	17
(India) Arjun M.R. (India) D Kapila	23	21
(England) B Lane (England) S Vendy	21	21
5	(Indonesia) F Alfian (Indonesia) M R Ardianto	18	19
(France) E Adam (France) J Maio	14	16
(Indonesia) P Kusumawardana (Indonesia) Y Rambitan	21	21
(England) M Ellis (England) C Langridge	21	15
2	(Indonesia) M Ahsan (Indonesia) H Setiawan	23	21

Second Round
(India) Arjun M.R. (India) D Kapila	9	11
(England) B Lane (England) S Vendy	21	21
(Indonesia) P Kusumawardana (Indonesia) Y Rambitan	18	18
2	(Indonesia) M Ahsan (Indonesia) H Setiawan	21	21

Quarter-finals
(England) B Lane (England) S Vendy	14	13
2	(Indonesia) M Ahsan (Indonesia) H Setiawan	21	21

== Women's doubles ==
=== Seeds ===
1. (Japan) Yuki Fukushima / Sayaka Hirota (withdrew)
2. (Japan) Mayu Matsumoto / Wakana Nagahara (withdrew)
3. (South Korea) Lee So-hee / Shin Seung-chan (final)
4. (South Korea) Kim So-yeong / Kong Hee-yong (champions)
5. (Indonesia) Greysia Polii / Apriyani Rahayu (semi-finals)
6. (South Korea) Chang Ye-na / Kim Hye-rin (first round)
7. (Thailand) Jongkolphan Kititharakul / Rawinda Prajongjai (quarter-finals)
8. (Japan) Nami Matsuyama / Chiharu Shida (withdrew)

=== Finals ===
Semi-finals
5	(Indonesia) Greysia Polii (Indonesia) Apriyani Rahayu	16	18
3	(South Korea) Lee So-hee (South Korea) Shin Seung-chan	21	21
4	(South Korea) Kim So-yeong (South Korea) Kong Hee-yong	21	21
(Malaysia) Chow Mei Kuan (Malaysia) Lee Meng Yean	17	6

Final
3	(South Korea) Lee So-hee (South Korea) Shin Seung-chan	18	19
4	(South Korea) Kim So-yeong (South Korea) Kong Hee-yong	21	21

=== Top half ===
==== Section 1 ====
First Round
(Denmark) A Bøje (Denmark) M Poulsen	22	21
(Singapore) Jin YJ (Singapore) C Wong J Y	20	18
5	(Indonesia) G Polii (Indonesia) A Rahayu	21	14	21
(Thailand) P Supajirakul (Thailand) S Taerattanachai	12	21	8
(Canada) C Choi (Canada) J Wu	21	21
(Egypt) D Hany (Egypt) H Hosny	15	5

Second Round
1	(Japan) Y Fukushima (Japan) S Hirota
(Denmark) A Bøje (Denmark) M Poulsen	w	/	o
5	(Indonesia) G Polii (Indonesia) A Rahayu	21	21
(Canada) C Choi (Canada) J Wu	11	10

Quarter-finals
(Denmark) A Bøje (Denmark) M Poulsen	9	17
5	(Indonesia) G Polii (Indonesia) A Rahayu	21	21

==== Section 2 ====
First Round
3	(South Korea) Lee S-h (South Korea) Shin S-c	21	21
(Thailand) B Aimsaard (Thailand) N Aimsaard	10	6
(Russia) A Akchurina (Russia) O Morozova	21	21
(Thailand) C Chaladchalam (Thailand) P Muenwong	19	19
8	(Japan) N Matsuyama (Japan) C Shida
(France) É Lefel (France) A Tran	w	/	o
(Malaysia) V Hoo K H (Malaysia) Yap C W	21	21
(England) C Birch (England) L Smith	14	14

Second Round
3	(South Korea) Lee S-h (South Korea) Shin S-c	21	21
(Russia) A Akchurina (Russia) O Morozova	13	11
(France) É Lefel (France) A Tran	21	17	12
(Malaysia) V Hoo K H (Malaysia) Yap C W	19	21	21

Quarter-finals
3	(South Korea) Lee S-h (South Korea) Shin S-c	21	21
(Malaysia) V Hoo K H (Malaysia) Yap C W	13	16

=== Bottom half ===
==== Section 3 ====
First Round
(Thailand) C Korepap (Thailand) J Sudjaipraparat	10	13
(Denmark) A Magelund (Denmark) F Ravn	21	21
(Indonesia) S F S Ramadhanti (Indonesia) R Sugiarto	11	10
7	(Thailand) J Kititharakul (Thailand) R Prajongjai	21	21
(India) A Ponnappa (India) N. S Reddy	11	19
(Germany) L Efler (Germany) I Herttrich	21	21
(Denmark) M Fruergaard (Denmark) S Thygesen	16^{r}
4	(South Korea) Kim S-y (South Korea) Kong H-y	19

Second Round
(Denmark) A Magelund (Denmark) F Ravn	17	15
7	(Thailand) J Kititharakul (Thailand) R Prajongjai	21	21
(Germany) L Efler (Germany) I Herttrich	14	15
4	(South Korea) Kim S-y (South Korea) Kong H-y	21	21

Quarter-finals
7	(Thailand) J Kititharakul (Thailand) R Prajongjai	17	13
4	(South Korea) Kim S-y (South Korea) Kong H-y	21	21

==== Section 4 ====
First Round
(France) V Hériau (France) M Lambert	22	23
(Thailand) L Kanlaha (Thailand) A Poyanon	20	21
(Malaysia) P Tan K L (Malaysia) Thinaah M	16	21	27
6	(South Korea) Chang Y-n (South Korea) Kim H-r	21	15	25
(Canada) R Honderich (Canada) K Tsai	17	16
(Malaysia) Chow M K (Malaysia) Lee M Y	21	21
(Australia) S Mapasa (Australia) G Somerville	w	/	o
2	(Japan) M Matsumoto (Japan) W Nagahara

Second Round
(France) V Hériau (France) M Lambert	21	16	9
(Malaysia) P Tan K L (Malaysia) Thinaah M	19	21	21
(Malaysia) Chow M K (Malaysia) Lee M Y	21	21
(Australia) S Mapasa (Australia) G Somerville	17	15

Quarter-finals
(Malaysia) P Tan K L (Malaysia) Thinaah M	20	12
(Malaysia) Chow M K (Malaysia) Lee M Y	22	21

== Mixed doubles ==
=== Seeds ===
1. (Thailand) Dechapol Puavaranukroh / Sapsiree Taerattanachai (champions)
2. (Indonesia) Praveen Jordan / Melati Daeva Oktavianti (first round)
3. (Japan) Yuta Watanabe / Arisa Higashino (withdrew)
4. (South Korea) Seo Seung-jae / Chae Yoo-jung (final)
5. (Malaysia) Chan Peng Soon / Goh Liu Ying (quarter-finals)
6. (Indonesia) Hafiz Faizal / Gloria Emanuelle Widjaja (quarter-finals)
7. (England) Marcus Ellis / Lauren Smith (second round)
8. (Hong Kong) Tang Chun Man / Tse Ying Suet (second round)

=== Finals ===
Semi-finals
1	(Thailand) Dechapol Puavaranukroh (Thailand) Sapsiree Taerattanachai	22	18	21
(India) Satwiksairaj Rankireddy (India) Ashwini Ponnappa	20	21	12
4	(South Korea) Seo Seung-jae (South Korea) Chae Yoo-jung	21	21
(Malaysia) Hoo Pang Ron (Malaysia) Cheah Yee See	9	16

Final
1	(Thailand) Dechapol Puavaranukroh (Thailand) Sapsiree Taerattanachai	21	22
4	(South Korea) Seo Seung-jae (South Korea) Chae Yoo-jung	16	20

=== Top half ===
==== Section 1 ====
First Round
1	(Thailand) D Puavaranukroh (Thailand) S Taerattanachai	21	21
(Netherlands) R Tabeling (Netherlands) S Piek	14	19
(Malaysia) Goh S H (Malaysia) S J Lai	21	21
(France) R Labar (France) A Tran	12	15
8	(Hong Kong) Tang C M (Hong Kong) Tse Y S	21	21
(Thailand) N Phuangphuapet (Thailand) C Korepap	13	6
PFR	(Thailand) W Thongkham (Thailand) T Kaweenuntavong	15	12
(South Korea) Ko S-h (South Korea) Eom H-w	21	21

Second Round
1	(Thailand) D Puavaranukroh (Thailand) S Taerattanachai	21	21
(Malaysia) Goh S H (Malaysia) S J Lai	12	19
8	(Hong Kong) Tang C M (Hong Kong) Tse Y S	20	17
(South Korea) Ko S-h (South Korea) Eom H-w	22	21

Quarter-finals
1	(Thailand) D Puavaranukroh (Thailand) S Taerattanachai	27	21	21
(South Korea) Ko S-h (South Korea) Eom H-w	29	15	9

==== Section 2 ====
First Round
PFR	(New Zealand) O Leydon-Davis (New Zealand) A Pak	2	16
(Germany) M Lamsfuß (Germany) I Herttrich	21	21
(India) S Rankireddy (India) A Ponnappa	23	21
(Denmark) N Nøhr (Denmark) A Magelund	21	18
5	(Malaysia) Chan P S (Malaysia) Goh L Y	21	21
(Germany) J R Jansen (Germany) K Ostermeyer	13	13
(Indonesia) A Maulana (Indonesia) M C Bandaso	8	21	21
PFR	(France) E Adam (France) M Lambert	21	12	11

Second Round
(Germany) M Lamsfuß (Germany) I Herttrich	20	21	16
(India) S Rankireddy (India) A Ponnappa	22	14	21
5	(Malaysia) Chan P S (Malaysia) Goh L Y	21	21
(Indonesia) A Maulana (Indonesia) M C Bandaso	18	15

Quarter-finals
(India) S Rankireddy (India) A Ponnappa	18	24	22
5	(Malaysia) Chan P S (Malaysia) Goh L Y	21	22	20

=== Bottom half ===
==== Section 3 ====
First Round
(Denmark) M Christiansen (Denmark) A Bøje	16	21	18
(Thailand) S Jomkoh (Thailand) S Paewsampran	21	15	21
(Malaysia) Tan K M (Malaysia) Lai P J	21	15	19
7	(England) M Ellis (England) L Smith	14	21	21
PFR	(Germany) D Hess (Germany) L Efler	3	12
(Russia) R Alimov (Russia) A Davletova	21	21
(Denmark) M Mikkelsen (Denmark) R Søby Hansen	9	10
4	(South Korea) Seo S-j (South Korea) Chae Y-j	21	21

Second Round
(Thailand) S Jomkoh (Thailand) S Paewsampran	21	11	23
7	(England) M Ellis (England) L Smith	18	21	21
(Russia) R Alimov (Russia) A Davletova	11	17
4	(South Korea) Seo S-j (South Korea) Chae Y-j	21	21

Quarter-finals
(Thailand) S Jomkoh (Thailand) S Paewsampran	22	18
4	(South Korea) Seo S-j (South Korea) Chae Y-j	24	21

==== Section 4 ====
First Round
(Hong Kong) Chang T C (Hong Kong) Ng W Y	12	21	14
(Canada) J Hurlburt-Yu (Canada) J Wu	21	18	21
(Indonesia) R Rivaldy (Indonesia) P H Mentari	15	13
6	(Indonesia) H Faizal (Indonesia) G E Widjaja	21	21
(Malaysia) Hoo P R (Malaysia) Cheah Y S	21	18	21
(India) B. S Reddy (India) N. S Reddy	14	21	13
(France) T Gicquel (France) D Delrue	14	21	21
2	(Indonesia) P Jordan (Indonesia) M D Oktavianti	21	9	13

Second Round
(Canada) J Hurlburt-Yu (Canada) J Wu	17	8
6	(Indonesia) H Faizal (Indonesia) G E Widjaja	21	21
(Malaysia) Hoo P R (Malaysia) Cheah Y S	21	21
(France) T Gicquel (France) D Delrue	14	16

Quarter-finals
6	(Indonesia) H Faizal (Indonesia) G E Widjaja	21	19	19
(Malaysia) Hoo P R (Malaysia) Cheah Y S	12	21	21

== Notes ==
Preceded by 2020 Yonex Thailand Open	BWF World Tour; 2020 BWF season	Succeeded by 2020 BWF World Tour Finals
