= 2020 Yonex Thailand Open =

2021 badminton tournament in Thailand

Yonex Thailand Open

Tournament details
- Dates: 12–17 January 2021
- Level: Super 1000
- Total prize money: US$1,000,000
- Venue: Impact Arena
- Location: Pak Kret, Nonthaburi, Thailand

Champions
- Men's singles: (Denmark) Viktor Axelsen
- Women's singles: (Spain) Carolina Marín
- Men's doubles: (Chinese Taipei) Lee Yang (Chinese Taipei) Wang Chi-lin
- Women's doubles: (Indonesia) Greysia Polii (Indonesia) Apriyani Rahayu
- Mixed doubles: (Thailand) Dechapol Puavaranukroh (Thailand) Sapsiree Taerattanachai

The Yonex Thailand Open (Note: Although the tournament takes place in 2021, it was part of the 2020 BWF World Tour and the BWF referred to it as the Yonex Thailand Open 2020.) was a badminton tournament which took place at the Impact Arena in Thailand from 12 to 17 January 2021. It had a total purse of $1,000,000.

== Tournament ==
The Yonex Thailand Open was the eighth tournament of the 2020 BWF World Tour and also part of the Thailand Open championships, which had been held since 1984. This tournament was organized by Badminton Association of Thailand and sanctioned by the BWF. It was the first of three BWF tournaments taking place in Thailand in January 2021. Participation in both Thailand Opens was mandatory to qualify for the 2020 BWF World Tour Finals.

Four out of five world number ones withdrew from all three tournaments. The Chinese team withdrew from all three tournaments after failing to get permission to travel to Thailand; affected players include Chen Qingchen and Jia Yifan (women's doubles), and Zheng Siwei and Huang Yaqiong (mixed doubles). In addition, the Japanese team withdrew from the tournaments following the positive COVID-19 diagnosis of Kento Momota (men's singles). Following Kevin Sanjaya Sukamuljo's positive COVID-19 diagnosis, he and Marcus Fernaldi Gideon (men's doubles) withdrew from the tournaments.

=== Venue ===
This international tournament was held at the Impact Arena in Pak Kret, Nonthaburi, Thailand.

=== Point distribution ===
Below is the point distribution for each phase of the tournament based on the BWF points system for the BWF World Tour Super 1000 event.

Winner	Runner-up	3/4	5/8	9/16	17/32
12,000	10,200	8,400	6,600	4,800	3,000

=== Prize money ===
The total prize money for this tournament was US$1,000,000. Distribution of prize money was in accordance with BWF regulations.

Event	Winner	Finals	Semi-finals	Quarter-finals	Last 16	Last 32
Singles	$70,000	$34,400	$14,000	$5,500	$3,000	$1,000
Doubles	$74,000	$35,000	$14,000	$6,250	$3,250	$1,000

== Men's singles ==
=== Seeds ===
1. (Japan) Kento Momota (withdrew)
2. (Chinese Taipei) Chou Tien-chen (semi-finals)
3. (Denmark) Anders Antonsen (first round)
4. (Denmark) Viktor Axelsen (champion)
5. (Indonesia) Anthony Sinisuka Ginting (semi-finals)
6. (Indonesia) Jonatan Christie (quarter-finals)
7. (Hong Kong) Ng Ka Long (final)
8. (Malaysia) Lee Zii Jia (quarter-finals)

=== Finals ===
Semi-finals
5	(Indonesia) Anthony Sinisuka Ginting	19	21	13
4	(Denmark) Viktor Axelsen	21	13	21
7	(Hong Kong) Ng Ka Long	17	21	21
2	(Chinese Taipei) Chou Tien-chen	21	18	15

Final
4	(Denmark) Viktor Axelsen	21	21
7	(Hong Kong) Ng Ka Long	14	14

=== Top half ===
==== Section 1 ====
First Round
PFR	(Thailand) S Avihingsanon	21	14	10
(Thailand) K Phetpradab	14	21	21
(Denmark) R Gemke	14	21	21
PFR	(Denmark) H-K Vittinghus	21	18	13
5	(Indonesia) A S Ginting	21	11	21
(South Korea) Heo K-h	15	21	16
(Thailand) K Vitidsarn	21	19	21
PFR	(Spain) L E Peñalver	12	21	16

Second Round
(Thailand) K Phetpradab	20	8
(Denmark) R Gemke	22	21
5	(Indonesia) A S Ginting	21	21
(Thailand) K Vitidsarn	16	19

Quarter-finals
(Denmark) R Gemke	14	21	5
5	(Indonesia) A S Ginting	21	19	21

==== Section 2 ====
First Round
4	(Denmark) V Axelsen	21	21
(Thailand) S Thammasin	12	6
(Thailand) K Wangcharoen	21	21
(India) B. Sai Praneeth	16	10
6	(Indonesia) J Christie	13	21	21
(Singapore) Loh K Y	21	10	16
(India) Parupalli K	9	21	8^{r}
PFR	(Canada) J Ho-Shue	21	13	14

Second Round
4	(Denmark) V Axelsen	21	21
(Thailand) K Wangcharoen	13	17
6	(Indonesia) J Christie	21	21
PFR	(Canada) J Ho-Shue	10	9

Quarter-finals
4	(Denmark) V Axelsen	21	21
6	(Indonesia) J Christie	14	5

=== Bottom half ===
==== Section 3 ====
First Round
(France) B Leverdez	12	21	16
(Chinese Taipei) Wang T-w	21	14	21
(Netherlands) M Caljouw	15	15
7	(Hong Kong) Ng K L	21	21
(Hong Kong) Lee C Y	21	21
PFR	(New Zealand) A Manota	13	17
(Malaysia) Liew D	21	21
3	(Denmark) A Antonsen	12	18

Second Round
(Chinese Taipei) Wang T-w	15	21	20
7	(Hong Kong) Ng K L	21	15	22
(Hong Kong) Lee C Y	21	21
(Malaysia) Liew D	14	17

Quarter-finals
7	(Hong Kong) Ng K L	21	21
(Hong Kong) Lee C Y	17	12

==== Section 4 ====
First Round
(India) S Kidambi	21	21
(India) So Verma	12	11
(India) Prannoy K	21	14	8
8	(Malaysia) Lee Z J	13	21	21
(India) Sa Verma	15	17
(Indonesia) S H Rhustavito	21	21
(Thailand) T Saensomboonsuk	21	10	14
2	(Chinese Taipei) Chou T-c	16	21	21

Second Round
(India) S Kidambi
8	(Malaysia) Lee Z J	w	/	o
(Indonesia) S H Rhustavito	16	19
2	(Chinese Taipei) Chou T-c	21	21

Quarter-finals
8	(Malaysia) Lee Z J	17	15
2	(Chinese Taipei) Chou T-c	21	21

== Women's singles ==
=== Seeds ===
1. (Chinese Taipei) Tai Tzu-ying (final)
2. (Japan) Akane Yamaguchi (withdrew)
3. (Japan) Nozomi Okuhara (withdrew)
4. (Thailand) Ratchanok Intanon (quarter-finals)
5. (Spain) Carolina Marín (champion)
6. (India) P. V. Sindhu (first round)
7. (South Korea) An Se-young (semi-finals)
8. (Canada) Michelle Li (quarter-finals)

=== Finals ===
Semi-finals
1	(Chinese Taipei) Tai Tzu-ying	21	23
(Denmark) Mia Blichfeldt	8	21
7	(South Korea) An Se-young	18	16
5	(Spain) Carolina Marín	21	21

Final
1	(Chinese Taipei) Tai Tzu-ying	9	16
5	(Spain) Carolina Marín	21	21

=== Top half ===
==== Section 1 ====
First Round
1	(Chinese Taipei) Tai T-y	21	26
PFR	(Thailand) B Aimsaard	18	24
(Thailand) P Chaiwan	19	14
(South Korea) Kim G-e	21	21
8	(Canada) M Li	21	24
(Hong Kong) Cheung N Y	17	22
(Indonesia) G M Tunjung	21	15	14
(South Korea) Sung J-h	15	21	21

Second Round
1	(Chinese Taipei) Tai T-y	21	21
(South Korea) Kim G-e	16	10
8	(Canada) M Li	21	21
(South Korea) Sung J-h	17	17

Quarter-finals
1	(Chinese Taipei) Tai T-y	21	21
8	(Canada) M Li	11	13

==== Section 2 ====
First Round
PFR	(Malaysia) Kisona S	15	15
(India) S Nehwal	21	21
(Thailand) B Ongbamrungphan	21	21
(Switzerland) S Jaquet	16	17
6	(India) P. V. Sindhu	21	24	13
(Denmark) M Blichfeldt	16	26	21
(Denmark) L Kjærsfeldt	17	21	16
(United States) I Wang	21	19	21

Second Round
(India) S Nehwal	23	14	16
(Thailand) B Ongbamrungphan	21	21	21
(Denmark) M Blichfeldt	21	21
(United States) I Wang	12	16

Quarter-finals
(Thailand) B Ongbamrungphan	13	18
(Denmark) M Blichfeldt	21	21

=== Bottom half ===
==== Section 3 ====
First Round
PFR	(Thailand) S Roongpiboonsopit	w	/	o
PFR	(Egypt) D Hany
(Malaysia) S Cheah S Y	15	12
7	(South Korea) An S-y	21	21
(Germany) Y Li	21	21
PFR	(Egypt) H Hosny	7	9
(Singapore) Yeo J M	15	15
4	(Thailand) R Intanon	21	21

Second Round
PFR	(Thailand) S Roongpiboonsopit	8	7
7	(South Korea) An S-y	21	21
(Germany) Y Li	11	15
4	(Thailand) R Intanon	21	21

Quarter-finals
7	(South Korea) An S-y	22	21
4	(Thailand) R Intanon	20	12

==== Section 4 ====
First Round
(Turkey) N Yiğit	20	13
(Thailand) P Chochuwong	22	21
(France) Qi XF	10	12
5	(Spain) C Marín	21	21
(Thailand) S Katethong	21	21
(Indonesia) R Hartawan	14	16
(Russia) E Kosetskaya	21	21
PFR	(Thailand) N Roongpiboonsopit	12	9

Second Round
(Thailand) P Chochuwong	8	12
5	(Spain) C Marín	21	21
(Thailand) S Katethong	21	21
(Russia) E Kosetskaya	16	8

Quarter-finals
5	(Spain) C Marín	21	21
(Thailand) S Katethong	16	16

== Men's doubles ==
=== Seeds ===
1. (Indonesia) Marcus Fernaldi Gideon / Kevin Sanjaya Sukamuljo (withdrew)
2. (Indonesia) Mohammad Ahsan / Hendra Setiawan (quarter-finals)
3. (Japan) Takeshi Kamura / Keigo Sonoda (withdrew)
4. (Japan) Hiroyuki Endo / Yuta Watanabe (withdrew)
5. (Indonesia) Fajar Alfian / Muhammad Rian Ardianto (second round)
6. (Chinese Taipei) Lee Yang / Wang Chi-lin (champions)
7. (South Korea) Choi Sol-gyu / Seo Seung-jae (semi-finals)
8. (Malaysia) Aaron Chia / Soh Wooi Yik (first round)

=== Finals ===
Semi-finals
(Malaysia) Goh V Shem (Malaysia) Tan Wee Kiong	21	21
PFR	(Indonesia) Leo Rolly Carnando (Indonesia) Daniel Marthin	19	10
6	(Chinese Taipei) Lee Yang (Chinese Taipei) Wang Chi-lin	15	21	21
7	(South Korea) Choi Sol-gyu (South Korea) Seo Seung-jae	21	14	14

Final
(Malaysia) Goh V Shem (Malaysia) Tan Wee Kiong	16	23	19
6	(Chinese Taipei) Lee Yang (Chinese Taipei) Wang Chi-lin	21	21	21

=== Top half ===
==== Section 1 ====
First Round
PFR	(Denmark) M Christiansen (Denmark) N Nøhr	21	16	21
(France) E Adam (France) J Maio	18	21	15
(Malaysia) Goh S F (Malaysia) N Izzuddin	21	19	21
(South Korea) Ko S-h (South Korea) Shin B-c	16	21	11
8	(Malaysia) A Chia (Malaysia) Soh W Y	7	19
(Malaysia) Goh V S (Malaysia) Tan W K	21	21
(Russia) V Ivanov (Russia) I Sozonov	21	19	17
(England) B Lane (England) S Vendy	17	21	21

Second Round
PFR	(Denmark) M Christiansen (Denmark) N Nøhr	19	10
(Malaysia) Goh S F (Malaysia) N Izzuddin	21	21
(Malaysia) Goh V S (Malaysia) Tan W K	21	21
(England) B Lane (England) S Vendy	11	19

Quarter-finals
(Malaysia) Goh S F (Malaysia) N Izzuddin	16	19
(Malaysia) Goh V S (Malaysia) Tan W K	21	21

==== Section 2 ====
First Round
PFR	(Germany) D Hess (Germany) J R Jansen	21	21
(New Zealand) O Leydon-Davis (New Zealand) A Manota	15	16
(England) M Ellis (England) C Langridge	21	21
(Thailand) B Isara (Thailand) M Jongjit	13	10
5	(Indonesia) F Alfian (Indonesia) M R Ardianto	17	21	22
(Thailand) N Phuangphuapet (Thailand) T Viriyangkura	21	16	20
(Indonesia) M S Fikri (Indonesia) B Maulana	21	27	13
PFR	(Indonesia) L R Carnando (Indonesia) D Marthin	15	29	21

Second Round
PFR	(Germany) D Hess (Germany) J R Jansen	12	16
(England) M Ellis (England) C Langridge	21	21
5	(Indonesia) F Alfian (Indonesia) M R Ardianto	21	17	20
PFR	(Indonesia) L R Carnando (Indonesia) D Marthin	16	21	22

Quarter-finals
(England) M Ellis (England) C Langridge	21	14	15
PFR	(Indonesia) L R Carnando (Indonesia) D Marthin	12	21	21

=== Bottom half ===
==== Section 3 ====
First Round
PFR	(Thailand) S Jomkoh (Thailand) K Kedren	23	21
(Germany) M Lamsfuß (Germany) M E Seidel	21	19
(Denmark) K Astrup (Denmark) A S Rasmussen	13	18
6	(Chinese Taipei) Lee Y (Chinese Taipei) Wang C-l	21	21
(Malaysia) Ong Y S (Malaysia) Teo E Y	13	21	24
(India) Arjun M.R. (India) D Kapila	21	8	22
(United States) P Chew (United States) R Chew	21	21
PFR	(Thailand) A Gaterahong (Thailand) N Tulamok	17	12

Second Round
PFR	(Thailand) S Jomkoh (Thailand) K Kedren	14	18
6	(Chinese Taipei) Lee Y (Chinese Taipei) Wang C-l	21	21
(Malaysia) Ong Y S (Malaysia) Teo E Y	21	21
(United States) P Chew (United States) R Chew	12	7

Quarter-finals
6	(Chinese Taipei) Lee Y (Chinese Taipei) Wang C-l	23	21
(Malaysia) Ong Y S (Malaysia) Teo E Y	21	15

==== Section 4 ====
First Round
(India) M Attri (India) B. S Reddy	19	14
PFR	(Thailand) W Phakjarung (Thailand) W Thongkham	21	21
(Canada) J Ho-Shue (Canada) N Yakura	17	12
7	(South Korea) Choi S-g (South Korea) Seo S-j	21	21
(India) S Rankireddy (India) C Shetty	19	21	21
(South Korea) Kim G-j (South Korea) Lee Y-d	21	16	14
(Indonesia) P Kusumawardana (Indonesia) Y Rambitan	14	19
2	(Indonesia) M Ahsan (Indonesia) H Setiawan	21	21

Second Round
PFR	(Thailand) W Phakjarung (Thailand) W Thongkham	9	12
7	(South Korea) Choi S-g (South Korea) Seo S-j	21	21
(India) S Rankireddy (India) C Shetty	19	17
2	(Indonesia) M Ahsan (Indonesia) H Setiawan	21	21

Quarter-finals
7	(South Korea) Choi S-g (South Korea) Seo S-j	21	21
2	(Indonesia) M Ahsan (Indonesia) H Setiawan	16	19

== Women's doubles ==
=== Seeds ===
1. (Japan) Yuki Fukushima / Sayaka Hirota (withdrew)
2. (Japan) Mayu Matsumoto / Wakana Nagahara (withdrew)
3. (South Korea) Lee So-hee / Shin Seung-chan (semi-finals)
4. (South Korea) Kim So-yeong / Kong Hee-yong (semi-finals)
5. (Indonesia) Greysia Polii / Apriyani Rahayu (champions)
6. (South Korea) Chang Ye-na / Kim Hye-rin (quarter-finals)
7. (Thailand) Jongkolphan Kititharakul / Rawinda Prajongjai (final)
8. (Japan) Nami Matsuyama / Chiharu Shida (withdrew)

=== Finals ===
Semi-finals
7	(Thailand) Jongkolphan Kititharakul (Thailand) Rawinda Prajongjai	21	17	22
4	(South Korea) Kim So-yeong (South Korea) Kong Hee-yong	17	21	20
3	(South Korea) Lee So-hee (South Korea) Shin Seung-chan	21	15	16
5	(Indonesia) Greysia Polii (Indonesia) Apriyani Rahayu	15	21	21

Final
7	(Thailand) Jongkolphan Kititharakul (Thailand) Rawinda Prajongjai	15	12
5	(Indonesia) Greysia Polii (Indonesia) Apriyani Rahayu	21	21

=== Top half ===
==== Section 1 ====
First Round
(Thailand) L Kanlaha (Thailand) A Povanon	12	21	21
(Singapore) Jin YJ (Singapore) C Wong J Y	21	15	18
7	(Thailand) J Kititharakul (Thailand) R Prajongjai	21	21
(Thailand) C Korepap (Thailand) J Sudjaipraparat	16	11
(France) É Lefel (France) A Tran	21	21
(Indonesia) S F S Ramadhanti (Indonesia) R Sugiarto	17	17

Second Round
1	(Japan) Y Fukushima (Japan) S Hirota
(Thailand) L Kanlaha (Thailand) A Povanon	w	/	o
7	(Thailand) J Kititharakul (Thailand) R Prajongjai	21	21
(France) É Lefel (France) A Tran	9	13

Quarter-finals
(Thailand) L Kanlaha (Thailand) A Povanon	10	17
7	(Thailand) J Kititharakul (Thailand) R Prajongjai	21	21

==== Section 2 ====
First Round
4	(South Korea) Kim S-y (South Korea) Kong H-y	21	21
(India) A Ponnappa (India) N. S Reddy	16	7
(Germany) L Efler (Germany) I Herttrich	14	23
(Thailand) C Chaladchalam (Thailand) P Muenwong	21	25
8	(Japan) N Matsuyama (Japan) C Shida
(England) C Birch (England) L Smith	w	/	o
(Denmark) M Fruergaard (Denmark) S Thygesen	21	21
(Egypt) D Hany (Egypt) H Hosny	5	9

Second Round
4	(South Korea) Kim S-y (South Korea) Kong H-y	21	21
(Thailand) C Chaladchalam (Thailand) P Muenwong	13	17
(England) C Birch (England) L Smith	10	21	21
(Denmark) M Fruergaard (Denmark) S Thygesen	21	12	13

Quarter-finals
4	(South Korea) Kim S-y (South Korea) Kong H-y	21	21
(England) C Birch (England) L Smith	8	11

=== Bottom half ===
==== Section 3 ====
First Round
(France) V Hériau (France) M Lambert	15	18
(Malaysia) Chow M K (Malaysia) Lee M Y	21	21
(Canada) C Choi (Canada) J Wu	8	13
6	(South Korea) Chang Y-n (South Korea) Kim H-r	21	21
(Russia) A Akchurina (Russia) O Morozova	10	11
(Malaysia) V Hoo K M (Malaysia) Yap C W	21	21
(Denmark) A Magelund (Denmark) F Ravn	10	17
3	(South Korea) Lee S-h (South Korea) Shin S-c	21	21

Second Round
(Malaysia) Chow M K (Malaysia) Lee M Y	20	21	11
6	(South Korea) Chang Y-n (South Korea) Kim H-r	22	19	21
(Malaysia) V Hoo K M (Malaysia) Yap C W	14	14
3	(South Korea) Lee S-h (South Korea) Shin S-c	21	21

Quarter-finals
6	(South Korea) Chang Y-n (South Korea) Kim H-r	15	21	15
3	(South Korea) Lee S-h (South Korea) Shin S-c	21	19	21

==== Section 4 ====
First Round
(Thailand) P Supajirakul (Thailand) S Taerattanachai	21	21
(Australia) S Mapasa (Australia) G Somerville	11	9
(Canada) R Honderich (Canada) K Tsai	12	11
5	(Indonesia) G Polii (Indonesia) A Rahayu	21	21
(Malaysia) P Tan K L (Malaysia) T Muralitharan	21	21
(Thailand) B Aimsaard (Thailand) N Aimsaard	19	17
(Denmark) A Bøje (Denmark) M Poulsen	w	/	o
2	(Japan) M Matsumoto (Japan) W Nagahara

Second Round
(Thailand) P Supajirakul (Thailand) S Taerattanachai	18	13
5	(Indonesia) G Polii (Indonesia) A Rahayu	21	21
(Malaysia) P Tan K L (Malaysia) T Muralitharan	22	21
(Denmark) A Bøje (Denmark) M Poulsen	20	14

Quarter-finals
5	(Indonesia) G Polii (Indonesia) A Rahayu	21	21
(Malaysia) P Tan K L (Malaysia) T Muralitharan	15	12

== Mixed doubles ==
=== Seeds ===
1. (Thailand) Dechapol Puavaranukroh / Sapsiree Taerattanachai (champions)
2. (Indonesia) Praveen Jordan / Melati Daeva Oktavianti (final)
3. (Japan) Yuta Watanabe / Arisa Higashino (withdrew)
4. (South Korea) Seo Seung-jae / Chae Yoo-jung (semi-finals)
5. (Malaysia) Chan Peng Soon / Goh Liu Ying (quarter-finals)
6. (Indonesia) Hafiz Faizal / Gloria Emanuelle Widjaja (first round)
7. (England) Marcus Ellis / Lauren Smith (second round)
8. (Hong Kong) Tang Chun Man / Tse Ying Suet (second round)

=== Finals ===
Semi-finals
1	(Thailand) Dechapol Puavaranukroh (Thailand) Sapsiree Taerattanachai	17	21	22
4	(South Korea) Seo Seung-jae (South Korea) Chae Yoo-jung	21	17	20
(France) Thom Gicquel (France) Delphine Delrue	16	21
2	(Indonesia) Praveen Jordan (Indonesia) Melati Daeva Oktavianti	21	23

Final
1	(Thailand) Dechapol Puavaranukroh (Thailand) Sapsiree Taerattanachai	21	20	21
2	(Indonesia) Praveen Jordan (Indonesia) Melati Daeva Oktavianti	3	22	18

=== Top half ===
==== Section 1 ====
First Round
1	(Thailand) D Puavaranukroh (Thailand) S Taerattanachai	18	21	21
(Malaysia) Hoo P R (Malaysia) Cheah Y S	21	16	15
(Malaysia) Goh S H (Malaysia) S J Lai	21	14	21
(France) R Labar (France) A Tran	16	21	17
5	(Malaysia) Chan P S (Malaysia) Goh L Y	22	21
(Indonesia) A Maulana (Indonesia) M C Bandaso	20	18
PFR	(France) E Adam (France) M Lambert	17	9
(Netherlands) R Tabeling (Netherlands) S Piek	21	21

Second Round
1	(Thailand) D Puavaranukroh (Thailand) S Taerattanachai	20	21	21
(Malaysia) Goh S H (Malaysia) S J Lai	22	18	12
5	(Malaysia) Chan P S (Malaysia) Goh L Y	21	21
(Netherlands) R Tabeling (Netherlands) S Piek	18	13

Quarter-finals
1	(Thailand) D Puavaranukroh (Thailand) S Taerattanachai	21	21
5	(Malaysia) Chan P S (Malaysia) Goh L Y	18	17

==== Section 2 ====
First Round
4	(South Korea) Seo S-j (South Korea) Chae Y-j	w	/	o
(Egypt) A H Elgamal (Egypt) D Hany
(Russia) R Alimov (Russia) A Davletova	15	24
(South Korea) Ko S-h (South Korea) Eom H-w	21	26
6	(Indonesia) H Faizal (Indonesia) G E Widjaja	11	29	16
(India) S Rankireddy (India) A Ponnappa	21	27	21
PFR	(New Zealand) O Leydon-Davis (New Zealand) A Pak	8	14
(Hong Kong) Chang T C (Hong Kong) Ng W Y	21	21

Second Round
4	(South Korea) Seo S-j (South Korea) Chae Y-j	18	21	21
(South Korea) Ko S-h (South Korea) Eom H-w	21	9	15
(India) S Rankireddy (India) A Ponnappa	12	17
(Hong Kong) Chang T C (Hong Kong) Ng W Y	21	21

Quarter-finals
4	(South Korea) Seo S-j (South Korea) Chae Y-j	21	15	21
(Hong Kong) Chang T C (Hong Kong) Ng W Y	16	21	4

=== Bottom half ===
==== Section 3 ====
First Round
(Canada) J Hurlburt-Yu (Canada) J Wu	12	13
(Germany) M Lamsfuß (Germany) I Herttrich	21	21
(India) B. S Reddy (India) N. S Reddy	20	17
8	(Hong Kong) Tang C M (Hong Kong) Tse Y S	22	21
(France) T Gicquel (France) D Delrue	21	21
(Denmark) M Mikkelsen (Denmark) R Søby Hansen	15	10
(Malaysia) Tan K M (Malaysia) Lai P J	21	21
PFR	(Germany) D Hess (Germany) L Efler	14	14

Second Round
(Germany) M Lamsfuß (Germany) I Herttrich	w	/	o
8	(Hong Kong) Tang C M (Hong Kong) Tse Y S
(France) T Gicquel (France) D Delrue	21	21
(Malaysia) Tan K M (Malaysia) Lai P J	16	15

Quarter-finals
(Germany) M Lamsfuß (Germany) I Herttrich	19	18
(France) T Gicquel (France) D Delrue	21	21

==== Section 4 ====
First Round
(Denmark) M Christiansen (Denmark) A Bøje	21	21
(Thailand) N Phuangphuapet (Thailand) C Korepap	14	12
(Germany) J R Jansen (Germany) K Ostermeyer	13	13
7	(England) M Ellis (England) L Smith	21	21
(Thailand) S Jomkoh (Thailand) S Paewsampran	21	11	21
(Indonesia) R Rivaldy (Indonesia) P H Mentari	18	21	19
(Denmark) N Nøhr (Denmark) A Magelund	17	16
2	(Indonesia) P Jordan (Indonesia) M D Oktavianti	21	21

Second Round
(Denmark) M Christiansen (Denmark) A Bøje	21	21
7	(England) M Ellis (England) L Smith	18	18
(Thailand) S Jomkoh (Thailand) S Paewsampran	14	20
2	(Indonesia) P Jordan (Indonesia) M D Oktavianti	21	22

Quarter-finals
(Denmark) M Christiansen (Denmark) A Bøje	19	20
2	(Indonesia) P Jordan (Indonesia) M D Oktavianti	21	22

== Notes ==
Preceded by 2020 SaarLorLux Open	BWF World Tour; 2020 BWF season	Succeeded by 2020 Toyota Thailand Open
