= Gloria Emanuelle Widjaja =

Indonesian badminton player (born 1993)

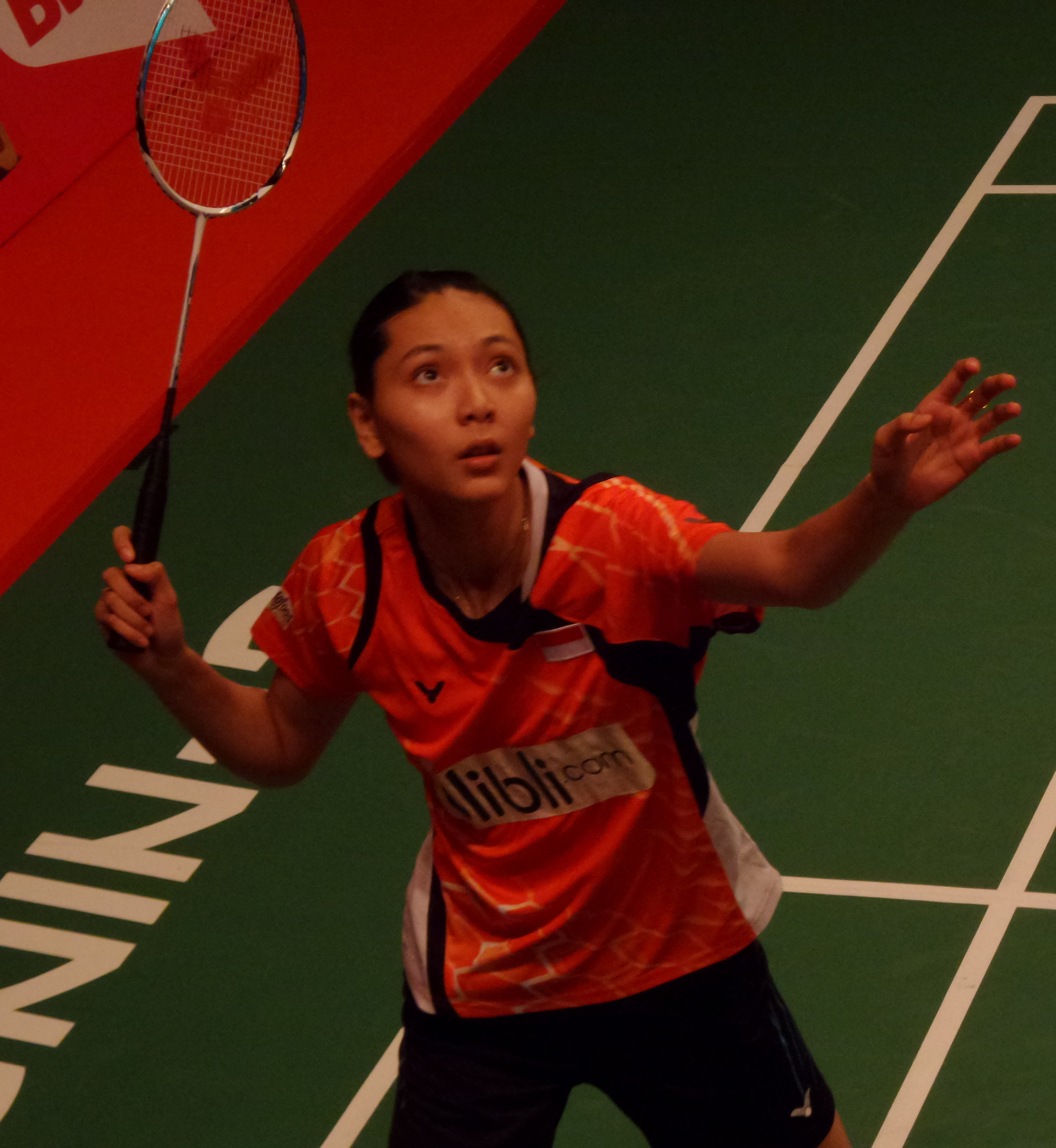
- Widjaja at the 2015 BWF World Championships

Personal information
- Born: 28 December 1993 (age 32) Bekasi, West Java, Indonesia
- Height: 182 cm (6 ft 0 in)
- Weight: 70 kg (150 lb)

Sport
- Country: Indonesia
- Sport: Badminton
- Handedness: Right

Mixed doubles
- Highest ranking: 6 (with Hafiz Faizal, 7 May 2019); 8 (with Dejan Ferdinansyah, 31 December 2024)
- Current ranking: 57 (with Rehan Naufal Kusharjanto, 16 June 2026)
- BWF profile
Medal record
Women's badminton
Representing Indonesia
Sudirman Cup
Bronze medal – third place	2019 Nanning	Mixed team
Bronze medal – third place	2025 Xiamen	Mixed team
Asian Championships
Bronze medal – third place	2023 Dubai	Mixed doubles
SEA Games
Bronze medal – third place	2017 Kuala Lumpur	Women's team
World Junior Championships
Gold medal – first place	2011 Taipei	Mixed doubles
Asia Junior Championships
Bronze medal – third place	2011 Lucknow	Mixed team

Gloria Emanuelle Widjaja (born 28 December 1993) is an Indonesian badminton player affiliated with PB Djarum since 2007. She was the 2011 Indonesia National and World Junior Champions in the mixed doubles event. For her achievements, Widjaja was awarded as the best Djarum player of the year. She won her first senior international title in 2014 Macau Open Grand Prix Gold.

== Career ==
Widjaja made a debut in the international tournament at the 2010 Indonesia International Challenge, reaching in to the quarterfinals in the women's and mixed doubles event. She was selected to join national junior team compete at the 2011 Asian and World Junior Championships. Teamed-up with Alfian Eko Prasetya, they emerged as the mixed doubles world junior champion, beating their compatriots Ronald Alexander and Tiara Rosalia Nuraidah in the rubber games 12–21, 21–17, 25–23 in the final. In 2012, she and Prasetya finished as the runner-up at the 2012 India International Challenge after defeated by the first seeded Irfan Fadhilah and Weni Anggraini in the final.

In early 2013, Widjaja started her partnership with the 2012 World junior champion, Edi Subaktiar. The duo competed at the 2013 Asian Championships, but lost to South Korean pair Ko Sung-hyun and Kim Ha-na in the first round. At the 2013 Indonesia Open Grand Prix Gold, they failed to advance to the final stage, had upset by the six seeded Praveen Jordan and Vita Marissa in the semifinal.

In 2014, Widjaja became the semifinalists at the Malaysia Grand Prix Gold, Indonesia Masters, Bulgarian International, Dutch Open with Edi Subaktiar, New Zealand Open with Irfan Fadhilah, and at the Indonesia International with Alfian Eko Prasetya. In November 2014, she and Subaktiar clinched their first title at the Grand Prix Gold tournament in Macau Open.

Widjaja started the 2015 season by competing at the Malaysia Masters Grand Prix Gold with Edi Subaktiar. They reached in to the semifinals round, but lost to their teammates Praveen Jordan and Debby Susanto. The duo then took the title at the Austrian Open. Widjaja and Subaktiar made their first appearance at the semifinals of the BWF Super Series event in India Open, and at the China Masters Grand Prix Gold, they grabbed the runner-up podium. In August 2015, she qualified to compete at the World Championships in Jakarta as the 12th seeded with Subaktiar. They finished in the third round, after defeated by the 8th seeded from South Korea Ko Sung-hyun and Kim Ha-na.

In mid 2016, Widjaja paired with Riky Widianto compete at the Chinese Taipei Open, and the new pair finished in the semifinals round. In 2017, Widjaja teamed-up with the 2016 Olympic gold medalist Tontowi Ahmad, but their partnership did not last long. Their best achievement was the semifinalist at the Malaysia Masters. Widjaja then paired up again with Edi Subaktiar, but due to injury suffered by Subaktiar at the SEA Games, she got a new partner again with Hafiz Faizal. They ended the 2017 BWF Season by achieve the semifinals in Bitburger Open and Korea Masters.

In 2018, Widjaja comes up with Hafiz Faizal, they showed their good performance by beat the seeded players to reach the semifinals round at the Malaysia Masters, but their pace intercepted by the 5th seeded Zheng Siwei and Huang Yaqiong. At the BWF Super 1000 Indonesia Open, they also finished in the semifinals. The partnership finally won their first title at the BWF Super 500 Thailand Open, beat the top seeded Chris and Gabby Adcock of England in the final with the score 21–12, 21–12.

In 2019, Widjaja reached the finals of German Open with Hafiz Faizal, but they were defeated by South Korean pair Seo Seung-jae and Chae Yoo-jung in straight games. In April, Widjaja and Faizal beat the Olympic Games silver medalists Chan Peng Soon and Goh Liu Ying to reach the semi-finals of Singapore Open, but they were stopped to another Malaysian pair Tan Kian Meng and Lai Pei Jing in a close rubber games. At the Oceania tour, she and her partner finished as the semi-finalists in New Zealand and quarter-finalists in Australian Open. Widjaja featured in Indonesian squad that won the bronze medal in Sudirman Cup. In July, she and Faizal beat the world number 1 Zheng Siwei and Huang Yaqiong in the quarter-finals of Japan Open, but the duo lost to their compatriot Praveen Jordan and Melati Daeva Oktavianti in the semi-finals. In August, she and her partner played at the World Championships held in Basel, Switzerland, but this time they lost to Zheng and Huang in the third round. In the remaining of the 2019 tour, their best results were the semi-finalists in Chinese Taipei and Hong Kong Open. Widjaja and Faizal qualified to compete at the World Tour Finals in Guangzhou, but only finished third in the group B standings. Widjaja and Faizal reached a career high as mixed doubles world number 6 in May 2019.

In 2020, Widjaja started the season as the semi-finalists in Malaysia Masters with her partner Hafiz Faizal. Two weeks later, the duo finished as the finalist in Thailand Masters lost to English pair Marcus Ellis and Lauren Smith in rubber games.

=== 2022 ===
In 2022, Widjaja formed a new partnership with Dejan Ferdinansyah, after she was dismissed from the national team. In March, they played in All England Open and lost in second round to four seeds and eventual winners Yuta Watanabe and Arisa Higashino of Japan. In the next tour, Swiss Open, they lost in first round. In May, they lost in the second round of Thailand Open from four seeds Wang Yilyu and Huang Dongping of China.

They won their first title as a pair in the Denmark Masters, and then clinched the home soil title in the Indonesia International Series. They later won their third consecutive title as a pair at the Vietnam Open where they defeated their compatriots Rehan Naufal Kusharjanto and Lisa Ayu Kusumawati in two games. In mid October, they clinched their fourth consecutive title by winning the Malang Indonesia International tournament. Their winning streak was then stopped by the Chinese pair Jiang Zhenbang and Wei Yaxin in the semi-finals of the Indonesia Masters, and their ranking shot to the top 50 in the world. In mid November, they reach the semi-finals of the Australian Open. They reached the career-highest ranking of 20 in the final weeks of 2022.

=== 2023 ===
In January, Widjaja with Ferdinansyah lost in the semi-finals of Malaysia Open from first seed Chinese pair Zheng Siwei and Huang Yaqiong. In the next tournament, they lost in the second round of the India Open from Japanese pair Kyohei Yamashita and Naru Shinoya. They competed in the home tournament, Indonesia Masters, but unfortunately lost in the quarter-finals from Japanese pair Yuki Kaneko and Misaki Matsutomo. In the next tournament, they lost in the quarter-finals of the Thailand Masters from 6th seed Chinese pair Feng Yanzhe and Olympic champion Huang Dongping.

In March, Widjaja and Ferdinansyah competed in the European tour, but unfortunately lost in the second round of German Open from Hong Kong pair Lee Chun Hei and Ng Tsz Yau. In the next tour, they lost in the first round of All England Open from fellow Indonesian and club mates Praveen Jordan and Melati Daeva Oktavianti in three games. In the next tour, they had to accept first round defeats in two consecutive tournaments at the Swiss Open from fellow Indonesian pair Rinov Rivaldy and Pitha Haningtyas Mentari.

In late April, Widjaja and Ferdinansyah competed at the Asian Championships in Dubai, United Arab Emirates, but had to lose in the semi-finals from Chinese pair Jiang Zhenbang and Wei Yaxin thus earn their first medal at the Asian Championships.

In May, Widjaja alongside the Indonesian team competed at the 2023 Sudirman Cup in Suzhou, China. She lost a match in the group stage, against Dechapol Puavaranukroh and Sapsiree Taerattanachai of Thailand. Indonesia advanced to the knockout stage but lost at the quarterfinals against China, where she almost upsetting the world no. 1 Zheng Siwei and Huang Yaqiong in the first match with scrapped doubles partner Rinov Rivaldy. In the following week, Widjaja and Ferdinansyah competed in the second Asian Tour at the Malaysia Masters. Unfortunately, they were lost in the second round from 4th seed and eventual finalist Chinese pair Feng Yanzhe and Huang Dongping.

In June, Widjaja and Ferdinansyah competed at the Singapore Open, but had to lose in the first round from Danish pair Mathias Thyrri and Amalie Magelund. In the next tour, they competed at the home tournament, Indonesia Open, but lost in the first round from 4th seed Korean pair Seo Seung-jae and Chae Yoo-jung.

In July, Widjaja and Ferdinansyah competed at the Korea Open, but had to lose in the second round from 6th seed Korean pair Seo Seung-jae and Chae Yoo-jung for second time in a row. In the next tour, they competed at the Japan Open, but lost in the second round against 2nd seed Thai pair Dechapol Puavaranukroh and Sapsiree Taerattanachai in three games.

In early August, Widjaja competed at the Australian Open, but had to lose in the first round from fellow Indonesian pair Rinov Rivaldy and Pitha Haningtyas Mentari in rubber games. In late August, she competed at the World Championships, but lost in the third round from 1st seed and reigning world champion Chinese pair Zheng Siwei and Huang Yaqiong in straight games. They then ended their losing streak in the early rounds by entering the final round in Kaohsiung Masters, finishing on the podium as runners-up. The duo finally won their first title of the year in the Syed Modi International, and closed the year as World number 14.

=== 2024 ===
Competing as an independent player, Ferdinansyah and his partner Widjaja not yet able to show their toughness in the international stage. Their best achievement in the first semester of 2024 were as quarter-finalists in the Thailand Masters, All England Open, Thailand Open, Malaysia Masters, and at the Indonesia Open. In September, they reached the semi-finals in the China Open, led him to 11th place in the world as his best ranking. The duo then reached the final in the Macau Open, finished as runner-up to Chinese pairing Guo Xinwa and Chen Fanghui.

== Achievements ==
=== Asian Championships ===
Mixed doubles
Year	Venue	Partner	Opponent	Score	Result	Ref.
2023	Sheikh Rashid Bin Hamdan Indoor Hall; Dubai, United Arab Emirates	(Indonesia) Dejan Ferdinansyah	(China) Jiang Zhenbang (China) Wei Yaxin	17–21, 15–21	Bronze	

=== BWF World Junior Championships ===
Mixed doubles
Year	Venue	Partner	Opponent	Score	Result	Ref.
2011	Taoyuan Arena; Taoyuan City, Taipei, Taiwan	(Indonesia) Alfian Eko Prasetya	(Indonesia) Ronald Alexander (Indonesia) Tiara Rosalia Nuraidah	12–21, 21–17, 25–23	Gold	

=== BWF World Tour (3 titles, 8 runners-up) ===
The BWF World Tour, which was announced on 19 March 2017 and implemented in 2018, is a series of elite badminton tournaments sanctioned by the Badminton World Federation (BWF). The BWF World Tour is divided into levels of World Tour Finals, Super 1000, Super 750, Super 500, Super 300, and the BWF Tour Super 100.

Mixed doubles
Year	Tournament	Level	Partner	Opponent	Score	Result	Ref.
2018	Thailand Open	Super 500	(Indonesia) Hafiz Faizal	(England) Chris Adcock (England) Gabby Adcock	21–12, 21–12	(gold) Winner	
2019	German Open	Super 300	(Indonesia) Hafiz Faizal	(South Korea) Seo Seung-jae (South Korea) Chae Yoo-jung	17–21, 11–21	(silver) Runner-up	
2020	Thailand Masters	Super 300	(Indonesia) Hafiz Faizal	(England) Marcus Ellis (England) Lauren Smith	16–21, 21–13, 16–21	(silver) Runner-up	
2022	Vietnam Open	Super 100	(Indonesia) Dejan Ferdinansyah	(Indonesia) Rehan Naufal Kusharjanto (Indonesia) Lisa Ayu Kusumawati	21–13, 21–18	(gold) Winner	
2023	Kaohsiung Masters	Super 100	(Indonesia) Dejan Ferdinansyah	(Japan) Hiroki Nishi (Japan) Akari Sato	20–22, 21–12, 14–21	(silver) Runner-up	
2023	Syed Modi International	Super 300	(Indonesia) Dejan Ferdinansyah	(Japan) Yuki Kaneko (Japan) Misaki Matsutomo	20–22, 21–19, 25–23	(gold) Winner	
2024	Macau Open	Super 300	(Indonesia) Dejan Ferdinansyah	(China) Guo Xinwa (China) Chen Fanghui	15–21, 18–21	(silver) Runner-up	
2024	Korea Masters	Super 300	(Indonesia) Dejan Ferdinansyah	(China) Guo Xinwa (China) Chen Fanghui	10–21, 12–21	(silver) Runner-up	
2025	German Open	Super 300	(Indonesia) Rehan Naufal Kusharjanto	(Netherlands) Robin Tabeling (Denmark) Alexandra Bøje	17–21, 12–21	(silver) Runner-up	
2025	Orléans Masters	Super 300	(Indonesia) Rehan Naufal Kusharjanto	(Denmark) Jesper Toft (Denmark) Amalie Magelund	17–21, 13–21	(silver) Runner-up	
2026 (II)	Indonesia Masters	Super 100	(Singapore) Terry Hee	(China) Li Hongyi (China) Huang Kexin	21–15, 5–21, 10–21	(silver) Runner-up	

=== BWF Grand Prix (1 title, 1 runner-up) ===
The BWF Grand Prix had two levels, the Grand Prix and Grand Prix Gold. It was a series of badminton tournaments sanctioned by the Badminton World Federation (BWF) and played between 2007 and 2017.

Mixed doubles
Year	Tournament	Partner	Opponent	Score	Result	Ref.
2014	Macau Open	(Indonesia) Edi Subaktiar	(Singapore) Danny Bawa Chrisnanta (Singapore) Vanessa Neo	21–15, 29–30, 22–20	(gold) Winner	
2015	China Masters	(Indonesia) Edi Subaktiar	(China) Liu Cheng (China) Bao Yixin	21–18, 15–21, 24–26	(silver) Runner-up	

BWF Grand Prix Gold tournament
BWF Grand Prix tournament

=== BWF International Challenge/Series (6 titles, 1 runner-up) ===
Mixed doubles
Year	Tournament	Partner	Opponent	Score	Result	Ref.
2012	India International	(Indonesia) Alfian Eko Prasetya	(Indonesia) Irfan Fadhilah (Indonesia) Weni Anggraini	16–21, 19–21	(silver) Runner-up	
2015	Austrian Open	(Indonesia) Edi Subaktiar	(Indonesia) Ronald Alexander (Indonesia) Melati Daeva Oktavianti	15–21, 22–20, 21–18	(gold) Winner	
2022	Denmark Masters	(Indonesia) Dejan Ferdinansyah	(Hong Kong) Lee Chun Hei (Hong Kong) Ng Tsz Yau	21–16, 21–19	(gold) Winner	
2022	Indonesia International	(Indonesia) Dejan Ferdinansyah	(Indonesia) Muhammad Reza Pahlevi Isfahani (Indonesia) Melati Daeva Oktavianti	19–21, 21–9, 23–21	(gold) Winner	
2022 (II)	Indonesia International	(Indonesia) Dejan Ferdinansyah	(China) Jiang Zhenbang (China) Wei Yaxin	21–18, 22–20	(gold) Winner	
2025	Polish Open	(Indonesia) Rehan Naufal Kusharjanto	(Denmark) Kristoffer Kolding (Denmark) Mette Werge	21–16, 14–21, 21–10	(gold) Winner	
2025	Vietnam International Series	(Indonesia) Aquino Evano Keneddy Tangka	(Thailand) Surasit Ariyabaraneekul (Thailand) Atitaya Povanon	16–14, 16–14	(gold) Winner	

BWF International Challenge tournament
BWF International Series tournament

=== BWF Junior International (1 runner-up) ===
Girls' doubles
Year	Tournament	Partner	Opponent	Score	Result	Ref.
2010	Indonesia Junior International	(Indonesia) Deariska Putri Medita	(Indonesia) Aris Budiharti (Indonesia) Dian Fitriani	17–21, 21–14, 16–21	(silver) Runner-up	

BWF Junior International Grand Prix tournament
BWF Junior International Challenge tournament
BWF Junior International Series tournament
BWF Junior Future Series tournament

== Performance timeline ==
Key

W	Won	F	Finalist	SF	Semi-finalist
QF	Quarter-finalist	#R	Rounds 4, 3, 2, 1	RR	Round-robin stage
Q#	Qualification round	A	Absent	w/d	Withdrew
G	Gold	S	Silver	B	Bronze
NH	Not held	N/A	Not applicable	DNQ	Did not qualify

=== National team ===
- Junior level

Team Events	2011
Asian Junior Championships	B
World Junior Championships	7th

- Senior level

Team Events	2017	2018	2019	2020	2021	2022	2023	2024	2025	Ref
SEA Games	B	NH	A	NH	A	NH	A	NH	A	
Asia Mixed Team Championships	QF	NH	A	NH			A	NH	A	
Sudirman Cup	RR	NH	B	NH	A	NH	QF	NH	B	

=== Individual competitions ===
==== Junior level ====
- Girls' doubles

Events	2011
Asian Junior Championships	3R

- Mixed doubles

Events	2011	Ref
Asian Junior Championships	2R	
World Junior Championships	G	

==== Senior level ====
===== Women's doubles =====
Tournament	BWF Superseries / Grand Prix					Best
Tournament	2010	2011	2012	2013	2014	Best
German Open	A				1R	1R ('14)
Dutch Open	A				QF	QF ('14)
Indonesia Masters	2R	1R	A		1R	2R ('10)
Year-end ranking		232	N/A	N/A	163	153
Tournament	2010	2011	2012	2013	2014	Best

===== Mixed doubles =====
Events	2013	2014	2015	2016	2017	2018	2019	2020	2021	2022	2023	2024	2025	2026	Ref
Asia Championships	1R	A		2R	A		QF	NH		A	B	2R	A		
World Championships	A		3R	NH	A	3R	3R	NH	A	A	3R	NH	Dec	2R	

Tournament	BWF Superseries / Grand Prix								BWF World Tour									Best	Ref
Tournament	2010	2011	2012	2013	2014	2015	2016	2017	2018	2019	2020	2021	2022	2023	2024	2025	2026	Best	Ref
Malaysia Open	A					2R	A	2R	2R	2R	NH		A	SF	2R	2R	A	SF ('23)	
India Open	A					SF	A	2R	1R	SF	NH		A	2R	1R	A		SF ('15, '19)	
Indonesia Masters	1R	A	QF	SF	SF	1R	1R	NH	1R	2R	1R	QF	A	QF	1R	A	QF	SF ('13, '14)	
Thailand Masters	NH						1R	w/d	A		F	NH		QF	QF	2R	2R	F ('20)	
German Open	A				1R	2R	A		1R	F	NH		w/d	2R	1R	F	SF	F ('19, '25)	
All England Open	A					1R	2R	A	QF	1R	QF	A	2R	1R	QF	QF	1R	QF ('18, '20, '24, '25)	
Swiss Open	A						2R	2R	A		NH	1R	1R	1R	2R	A		2R ('16, '17, 24)	
Orléans Masters	NH		NA						A		NH	A				F	A	F ('25)	
Thailand Open	NH	A	1R	QF	NH	1R	2R	A	W	2R	1R	NH	2R	A	QF	A		W ('18)	
Thailand Open	NH	A	1R	QF	NH	1R	2R	A	W	2R	QF	NH	2R	A	QF	A		W ('18)	
Malaysia Masters	A		2R	QF	SF	SF	A	SF	SF	2R	SF	NH	A	2R	QF	A		SF ('14, '15, '17, '18, '20)	
Singapore Open	A						2R	A		SF	NH		A	1R	2R	2R	1R	SF ('19)	
Indonesia Open	A		1R	A		2R	1R	1R	SF	2R	NH	QF	A	1R	QF	1R	1R	SF ('18)	
Australian Open	A					2R	A		2R	QF	NH		SF	1R	A		QF	SF ('22)	
Macau Open	A		1R	A	W	QF	1R	A		QF	NH				F	QF	A	W ('14)	
Canada Open	A										NH		A		1R	A		1R ('24)	
Japan Open	A					1R	A		2R	SF	NH		A	2R	1R	2R	A	SF ('19)	
China Open	A			1R	A				1R	1R	NH			2R	SF	QF	2R	SF ('24)	
Taipei Open	A				1R	1R	SF	A		SF	NH		A			2R	SF	SF ('16, '19, '26)	
Korea Masters	A		2R	QF	A			SF	A		NH		A		F	A		F ('24)	
China Masters	A					F	1R	2R	1R	1R	NH			2R	QF	A		F ('15)	
Indonesia Masters Super 100	NA								A		NH		SF	A				F ('26 II)	
Indonesia Masters Super 100	NA								A		NH		SF	A			F	F ('26 II)	
Vietnam Open	A										NH		W	A				W ('22)	
Arctic Open	NA	NH	NA								NH			2R	A			2R ('23)	
Denmark Open	A								2R	2R	A	1R	A	2R	A			2R ('18, '19, '23)	
French Open	A					1R	A	1R	1R	2R	NH	A		2R	2R	A		2R ('19, '23' 24)	
Hylo Open	A					1R	A	SF	A			QF	A	QF	A		Q	SF ('17)	
Korea Open	A					1R	A		QF	2R	NH		A	2R	1R	A	Q	QF ('18)	
Japan Masters	NH													A	1R	A	Q	1R ('24)	
Kaohsiung Masters	NH													F	A			F ('23)	
Hong Kong Open	A			1R	A	2R	A	2R	QF	SF	NH			1R	1R	A		SF ('19)	
Syed Modi International	A			NH	A						NH		A	W	A			W ('23)	
Guwahati Masters	NH													QF	A			QF ('23)	
Superseries / World Tour Finals	DNQ								RR	RR	RR	DNQ			RR	DNQ		RR ('18, '19, '20, '24)	
Chinese Taipei Masters	NA					A	SF	NH										SF ('16)	
Dutch Open	A				SF	A					NH	NA						SF ('14)	
New Zealand Open	NH	NA	NH	A	SF	A		QF	2R	SF	NH							SF ('14, '19)	
Spain Masters	NA								A				NH	A	1R	NH		1R ('24)	
Year-end ranking		348	50	38	35	13	56	66	12	9	8	11	20	14	8	15		6	
Tournament	2010	2011	2012	2013	2014	2015	2016	2017	2018	2019	2020	2021	2022	2023	2024	2025	2026	Best	Ref

== Record against selected opponents ==
Record against year-end Finals finalists, World Championships semi-finalists, and Olympic quarter-finalists.

=== Edi Subaktiar ===
Widjaja and Subaktiar partnership had never led in record meetings against top pairs. They had a poor head-to-head record against Ko Sung-hyun and Kim Ha-na (0–6).

Players	M	W	L	Diff.
(China) Liu Cheng & Bao Yixin	2	0	2	–2
(China) Xu Chen & Ma Jin	2	0	2	–2
(China) Zhang Nan & Zhao Yunlei	1	0	1	–1
(China) Zheng Siwei & Chen Qingchen	2	1	1	0
(England) Chris Adcock & Gabby Adcock	2	1	1	0
(Germany) Michael Fuchs & Birgit Michels	1	0	1	–1

Players	M	W	L	Diff.
(Hong Kong) Lee Chun Hei & Chau Hoi Wah	2	1	1	0
(Indonesia) Tontowi Ahmad & Liliyana Natsir	1	0	1	–1
(Indonesia) Praveen Jordan & Debby Susanto	1	0	1	–1
(Japan) Yuta Watanabe & Arisa Higashino	1	0	1	–1
(Malaysia) Chan Peng Soon & Goh Liu Ying	2	1	1	0
(South Korea) Ko Sung-hyun & Kim Ha-na	6	0	6	–6

=== Hafiz Faizal ===
Partnered with Hafiz Faizal, the duo managed to lead the head-to-head record against English pair Chris and Gabby Adcock (+2); German pair Mark Lamsfuß and Isabel Lohau (+3); and also Hong Kong pair Lee Chun Hei and Chau Hoi Wah (+1). Contrary, they had a bad head-to-head record against Chinese pair Zheng Siwei and Huang Yaqiong (–6); and also Thai pair Dechapol Puavaranukroh and Sapsiree Taerattanachai (–6).

Players	M	W	L	Diff.
(China) Wang Yilyu & Huang Dongping	3	0	3	–2
(China) Zhang Nan & Li Yinhui	2	1	1	0
(China) Zheng Siwei & Chen Qingchen	1	0	1	–1
(China) Zheng Siwei & Huang Yaqiong	8	1	7	–6
(England) Chris Adcock & Gabby Adcock	4	3	1	+2
(England) Marcus Ellis & Lauren Smith	2	1	1	0
(Germany) Mark Lamsfuß & Isabel Lohau	3	3	0	+3
(Hong Kong) Lee Chun Hei & Chau Hoi Wah	1	1	0	+1

Players	M	W	L	Diff.
(Hong Kong) Tang Chun Man & Tse Ying Suet	3	1	2	–1
(Indonesia) Tontowi Ahmad & Liliyana Natsir	3	1	2	–1
(Indonesia) Praveen Jordan & Melati Daeva Oktavianti	6	2	4	–2
(Japan) Yuta Watanabe & Arisa Higashino	6	1	5	–4
(Malaysia) Chan Peng Soon & Goh Liu Ying	3	1	2	–1
(South Korea) Ko Sung-hyun & Kim Ha-na	3	0	3	–3
(South Korea) Seo Seung-jae & Chae Yoo-jung	2	0	2	–2
(Thailand) Dechapol Puavaranukroh & Sapsiree Taerattanachai	6	0	6	–6
