= Hafiz Faizal =

Indonesian badminton player (born 1994)

Personal information
- Born: 23 September 1994 (age 32) Jakarta, Indonesia
- Height: 1.70 m (5 ft 7 in)
- Weight: 71 kg (157 lb)

Sport
- Country: Indonesia
- Sport: Badminton
- Handedness: Right

Mixed doubles
- Highest ranking: 6 (XD with Gloria Emanuelle Widjaja 7 May 2019)
- BWF profile
Medal record
Men's badminton
Representing Indonesia
Sudirman Cup
Bronze medal – third place	2019 Nanning	Mixed team
SEA Games
Gold medal – first place	2017 Kuala Lumpur	Men's team

Hafiz Faizal (born 23 September 1994) is an Indonesian badminton player who is affiliated with the Jaya Raya Jakarta badminton club.

== Achievements ==
=== BWF World Tour (1 title, 2 runners-up) ===
The BWF World Tour, which was announced on 19 March 2017 and implemented in 2018, is a series of elite badminton tournaments sanctioned by the Badminton World Federation (BWF). The BWF World Tour is divided into levels of World Tour Finals, Super 1000, Super 750, Super 500, Super 300, and the BWF Tour Super 100.

Mixed doubles
Year	Tournament	Level	Partner	Opponent	Score	Result	Ref.
2018	Thailand Open	Super 500	(Indonesia) Gloria Emanuelle Widjaja	(England) Chris Adcock (England) Gabby Adcock	21–12, 21–12	(gold) Winner	
2019	German Open	Super 300	(Indonesia) Gloria Emanuelle Widjaja	(South Korea) Seo Seung-jae (South Korea) Chae Yoo-jung	17–21, 11–21	(silver) Runner-up	
2020	Thailand Masters	Super 300	(Indonesia) Gloria Emanuelle Widjaja	(England) Marcus Ellis (England) Lauren Smith	16–21, 21–13, 16–21	(silver) Runner-up	

=== BWF International Challenge/Series (3 titles, 3 runners-up) ===
Mixed doubles
Year	Tournament	Partner	Opponent	Score	Result
2012	Vietnam International	(Indonesia) Pia Zebadiah Bernadet	(Singapore) Danny Bawa Chrisnanta (Singapore) Vanessa Neo	11–21, 21–17, 21–17	(gold) Winner
2014	USM Indonesia International	(Indonesia) Shella Devi Aulia	(Indonesia) Lukhi Apri Nugroho (Indonesia) Masita Mahmudin	21–23, 21–18, 14–21	(silver) Runner-up
2014	Malaysia International	(Indonesia) Shella Devi Aulia	(Singapore) Terry Hee (Singapore) Tan Wei Han	19–21, 21–19, 21–18	(gold) Winner
2015	Vietnam International	(Indonesia) Masita Mahmudin	(Indonesia) Fran Kurniawan (Indonesia) Komala Dewi	14–21, 11–21	(silver) Runner-up
2015	Singapore International	(Indonesia) Shella Devi Aulia	(Thailand) Tinn Isriyanet (Thailand) Savitree Amitrapai	21–14, 21–17	(gold) Winner
2015	Malaysia International	(Indonesia) Shella Devi Aulia	(Thailand) Bodin Isara (Thailand) Savitree Amitrapai	13–21, 6–21	(silver) Runner-up

BWF International Challenge tournament
BWF International Series tournament

=== BWF Junior International (4 titles, 1 runner-up) ===
Boys' doubles
Year	Tournament	Partner	Opponent	Score	Result
2012	Dutch Junior	(Indonesia) Putra Eka Rhoma	(Hong Kong) Lee Chun Hei (Hong Kong) Tam Chun Hei	21–18, 20–22, 14–21	(silver) Runner-up
2012	Australian Junior International	(Indonesia) Putra Eka Rhoma	(Sri Lanka) Pramuditha Lahiru Ambegoda (Sri Lanka) Pamoda Laushika Hettiarachichi	21–7, 21–10	(gold) Winner
2012	Indonesia Junior International	(Indonesia) Putra Eka Rhoma	(Indonesia) Rafiddias Akhdan Nugroho (Indonesia) Kevin Sanjaya Sukamuljo	22–20, 21–12	(gold) Winner

Mixed doubles
Year	Tournament	Partner	Opponent	Score	Result	Ref.
2010	Indonesia Junior International	(Indonesia) Shela Devi Aulia	(Indonesia) Dandi Prabudita (Indonesia) Deariska Putri Medita	22–20, 21–19	(gold) Winner	
2011	Indonesia Junior International	(Indonesia) Shella Devi Aulia	(Indonesia) Putra Eka Rhoma (Indonesia) Aris Budiharti	21–14, 15–21, 23–21	(gold) Winner	
2012	Australian Junior International	(Indonesia) Ruselli Hartawan	(Indonesia) Putra Eka Rhoma (Indonesia) Lya Ersalita	18–21, 21–16, 21–15	(gold) Winner	

BWF Junior International Grand Prix tournament
BWF Junior International Challenge tournament
BWF Junior International Series tournament
BWF Junior Future Series tournament

== Performance timeline ==
Key

W	Won	F	Finalist	SF	Semi-finalist
QF	Quarter-finalist	#R	Rounds 4, 3, 2, 1	RR	Round-robin stage
Q#	Qualification round	A	Absent	w/d	Withdrew
G	Gold	S	Silver	B	Bronze
NH	Not held	N/A	Not applicable	DNQ	Did not qualify

=== National team ===
- Junior level

Team events	2011	2012
Asian Junior Championships	A	QF
World Junior Championships	7th	4th

- Senior level

Team events	2017	2018	2019
SEA Games	G	NH	A
Sudirman Cup	A	NH	B

=== Individual competitions ===
==== Junior level ====
- Boys' doubles

Events	2011	2012
Asian Junior Championships	A	3R
World Junior Championships	3R	3R

- Mixed ' doubles

Events	2011	2012
Asian Junior Championships	A	2R
World Junior Championships	4R	A

==== Senior level ====
===== Men's doubles =====
Tournament	BWF Superseries / Grand Prix							BWF World Tour					Best
Tournament	2011	2012	2013	2014	2015	2016	2017	2018	2019	2020	2021	2022	Best
Thailand Open	A	1R	A	NH	A						NH	A	1R ('12)
Indonesia Masters	Q2	SF	2R	1R	A		NH	A					SF ('12)
Indonesia Open	A		Q1	A		1R	A			NH	A		1R ('16)
Malaysia Masters	A		1R	A							NH	A	1R ('13)
Chinese Taipei Open	A					2R	A			NH		A	2R ('16)
Vietnam Open	1R	2R	w/d	A						NH		A	2R ('12)
Indonesia Masters Super 100	NA							A		NH		1R	1R ('22)
Hong Kong Open	A	1R	A							NH			1R ('12)
Year-end ranking	141	88	140	343	—N/a	191	—N/a	—N/a	—N/a	—N/a	—N/a		67
Tournament	2012	2013	2014	2015	2016	2017	2018	2019	2020	2021	2022	Best	

===== Mixed doubles =====
Events	2018	2019	2020	2021	2022	Ref
Asian Championships	A	QF	NH		A	
World Championships	3R	3R	NH	A		

Tournament	BWF Superseries / Grand Prix							BWF World Tour					Best	Ref
Tournament	2011	2012	2013	2014	2015	2016	2017	2018	2019	2020	2021	2022	Best	Ref
India Open	A						1R	1R	SF	NH		A	SF ('19)	
Syed Modi International	A		NH	A		1R	A			NH		A	1R ('16)	
German Open	A						2R	1R	F	NH		A	F ('19)	
All England Open	A						1R	QF	1R	QF	A		QF ('18, '20)	
Swiss Open	A									NH	1R	A	1R ('21)	
Korea Open	A							QF	2R	NH		A	QF ('18)	
Korea Masters	A				1R	A	SF	A		NH		A	SF ('17)	
Thailand Open	A	1R	A	NH	A			W	2R	1R	NH	A	W ('18)	
Thailand Open	A	1R	A	NH	A			W	2R	QF	NH	A	W ('18)	
Indonesia Masters	Q2	2R	A	2R	SF	SF	NH	1R	2R	1R	QF	1R	SF ('15, '16)	
Indonesia Open	A			Q1	Q1	1R	2R	SF	2R	NH	QF	1R	SF ('18)	
Malaysia Open	A						1R	2R	2R	NH		1R	2R ('18, '19)	
Malaysia Masters	A					QF	A	SF	2R	SF	NH	2R	SF ('18, '20)	
Singapore Open	A								SF	NH		2R	SF ('19)	
Chinese Taipei Open	A					SF	A		SF	NH		A	SF ('16, '19)	
Japan Open	A							2R	SF	NH		A	SF ('19)	
Vietnam Open	2R	A			QF	SF	A			NH		A	SF ('16)	
Indonesia Masters Super 100	NA							A		NH		QF	QF ('22)	
Denmark Open	A							2R	2R	A	1R	A	2R ('18, '19)	
French Open	A					1R	1R	1R	2R	NH	A		2R ('19)	
Hylo Open	A					1R	SF	A		NH	QF	A	SF ('17)	
Macau Open	A	2R	A			1R	A		QF	NH			QF ('19)	
Hong Kong Open	A					1R	2R	QF	SF	NH			SF ('19)	
Australian Open	A							2R	QF	NH			QF ('19)	
New Zealand Open	IC	NH	A			QF	1R	2R	SF	NH			SF ('19)	
China Open	A							1R	1R	NH			1R ('18, '19)	
Fuzhou China Open	A					2R	SF	1R	1R	NH			SF ('17)	
Superseries / World Tour Finals	DNQ							RR	RR	RR	DNQ		RR ('18, '19, '20)	
Chinese Taipei Masters	NH				1R	A	NH						1R ('15)	
Thailand Masters	NH					A				F	NH		F ('20)	
Year-end ranking	164	154	N/A	123	65	19	61	12	9	8	11	74	6	
Tournament	2011	2012	2013	2014	2015	2016	2017	2018	2019	2020	2021	2022	Best	Ref

== Record against selected opponents ==
Record against year-end Finals finalists, World Championships semi-finalists, and Olympic quarter-finalists.

- (China) Lu Kai & Huang Yaqiong 1–0
- (Indonesia) Muhammad Rijal & Vita Marissa 0–2
- (Indonesia) Praveen Jordan & Debby Susanto 0–1
