= Rawinda Prajongjai =

Thai badminton player (born 1993)

Personal information
- Nickname: View
- Born: 29 June 1993 (age 33) Bangkok, Thailand
- Years active: 2013–2024
- Height: 1.64 m (5 ft 5 in)
- Weight: 54 kg (119 lb)
- Spouse: Sitthikom Thammasin (m. 2025)

Sport
- Country: Thailand
- Sport: Badminton
- Handedness: Right
- Retired: 13 August 2024

Women's singles & doubles
- Highest ranking: 86 (WS, 21 November 2013); 5 (WD with Jongkolphan Kititharakul, 20 December 2022); 293 (XD with Wannawat Ampunsuwan, 5 December 2013)
- BWF profile
Medal record
Women's badminton
Representing Thailand
Sudirman Cup
Bronze medal – third place	2017 Gold Coast	Mixed team
Bronze medal – third place	2019 Nanning	Mixed team
Uber Cup
Silver medal – second place	2018 Bangkok	Women's team
Bronze medal – third place	2020 Aarhus	Women's team
Bronze medal – third place	2022 Bangkok	Women's team
Asian Games
Bronze medal – third place	2018 Jakarta–Palembang	Women's team
Bronze medal – third place	2022 Hangzhou	Women's team
Asian Championships
Bronze medal – third place	2023 Dubai	Women's doubles
Asia Mixed Team Championships
Bronze medal – third place	2017 Ho Chi Minh	Mixed team
Asia Team Championships
Silver medal – second place	2024 Selangor	Women's team
Bronze medal – third place	2016 Hyderabad	Women's team
Bronze medal – third place	2020 Manila	Women's team
SEA Games
Gold medal – first place	2015 Singapore	Women's team
Gold medal – first place	2017 Kuala Lumpur	Women's doubles
Gold medal – first place	2017 Kuala Lumpur	Women's team
Gold medal – first place	2019 Philippines	Women's team
Gold medal – first place	2021 Vietnam	Women's team
Gold medal – first place	2023 Cambodia	Women's team
Summer Universiade
Bronze medal – third place	2013 Kazan	Mixed team
Bronze medal – third place	2015 Gwangju	Mixed team
Asian Junior Championships
Bronze medal – third place	2009 Kuala Lumpur	Mixed team

Rawinda Prajongjai (Thai: รวินดา ประจงใจ; born 29 June 1993) is a Thai badminton player. She was part of the national women's team that clinched the gold medal at the 2015, 2017, 2019, 2021, and 2023 SEA Games; and also won the women's doubles title in 2017. Starting her career as a singles player, Prajongjai won her first international title at the 2013 Smiling Fish International tournament. She later focused on playing in doubles, and won her first Grand Prix tournament in 2015 Vietnam Open teamed-up with Jongkolphan Kititharakul. The two also competed for Thailand in the women's doubles events at the 2020 and 2024 Summer Olympics.

== Achievements ==
=== Asian Championships ===
Women's doubles
Year	Venue	Partner	Opponent	Score	Result
2023	Sheikh Rashid Bin Hamdan Indoor Hall; Dubai, United Arab Emirates	(Thailand) Jongkolphan Kititharakul	(Japan) Yuki Fukushima (Japan) Sayaka Hirota	18–21, 15–21	Bronze

=== SEA Games ===
Women's doubles
Year	Venue	Partner	Opponent	Score	Result
2017	Axiata Arena; Kuala Lumpur, Malaysia	(Thailand) Jongkolphan Kititharakul	(Thailand) Puttita Supajirakul (Thailand) Sapsiree Taerattanachai	21–16, 7–8 retired	Gold

=== BWF World Tour (4 titles, 6 runners-up) ===
The BWF World Tour, which was announced on 19 March 2017 and implemented in 2018, is a series of elite badminton tournaments sanctioned by the Badminton World Federation (BWF). The BWF World Tour is divided into levels of World Tour Finals, Super 1000, Super 750, Super 500, Super 300, and the BWF Tour Super 100.

Women's doubles
Year	Tournament	Level	Partner	Opponent	Score	Result
2018	Thailand Masters	Super 300	(Thailand) Jongkolphan Kititharakul	(Indonesia) Anggia Shitta Awanda (Indonesia) Ni Ketut Mahadewi Istarani	21–19, 21–17	(gold) Winner
2018	India Open	Super 500	(Thailand) Jongkolphan Kititharakul	(Indonesia) Greysia Polii (Indonesia) Apriyani Rahayu	18–21, 15–21	(silver) Runner-up
2019	Chinese Taipei Open	Super 300	(Thailand) Jongkolphan Kititharakul	(South Korea) Kim So-yeong (South Korea) Kong Hee-yong	21–19, 18–21, 28–26	(gold) Winner
2019	Macau Open	Super 300	(Thailand) Jongkolphan Kititharakul	(China) Du Yue (China) Li Yinhui	16–21, 21–10, 12–21	(silver) Runner-up
2020 (I)	Thailand Open	Super 1000	(Thailand) Jongkolphan Kititharakul	(Indonesia) Greysia Polii (Indonesia) Apriyani Rahayu	15–21, 12–21	(silver) Runner-up
2021	Orléans Masters	Super 100	(Thailand) Jongkolphan Kititharakul	(Bulgaria) Gabriela Stoeva (Bulgaria) Stefani Stoeva	21–16, 21–16	(gold) Winner
2022	Hylo Open	Super 300	(Thailand) Jongkolphan Kititharakul	(Thailand) Benyapa Aimsaard (Thailand) Nuntakarn Aimsaard	18–21, 21–18, 17–21	(silver) Runner-up
2023	Arctic Open	Super 500	(Thailand) Jongkolphan Kititharakul	(China) Liu Shengshu (China) Tan Ning	13–21, 22–24	(silver) Runner-up
2023	French Open	Super 750	(Thailand) Jongkolphan Kititharakul	(China) Liu Shengshu (China) Tan Ning	24–26, 19–21	(silver) Runner-up
2024	Thailand Open	Super 500	(Thailand) Jongkolphan Kititharakul	(Indonesia) Febriana Dwipuji Kusuma (Indonesia) Amallia Cahaya Pratiwi	21–14, 21–14	(gold) Winner

=== BWF Grand Prix (3 titles, 2 runners-up) ===
The BWF Grand Prix had two levels, the Grand Prix and Grand Prix Gold. It was a series of badminton tournaments sanctioned by the Badminton World Federation (BWF) and played between 2007 and 2017.

Women's doubles
Year	Tournament	Partner	Opponent	Score	Result
2015	Vietnam Open	(Thailand) Jongkolphan Kititharakul	(Indonesia) Suci Rizky Andini (Indonesia) Maretha Dea Giovani	21–14, 21–12	(gold) Winner
2016	Indonesian Masters	(Thailand) Jongkolphan Kititharakul	(South Korea) Chae Yoo-jung (South Korea) Kim So-yeong	18–21, 20–22	(silver) Runner-up
2016	Bitburger Open	(Thailand) Jongkolphan Kititharakul	(China) Chen Qingchen (China) Jia Yifan	12–21, 19–21	(silver) Runner-up
2017	Malaysia Masters	(Thailand) Jongkolphan Kititharakul	(Hong Kong) Poon Lok Yan (Hong Kong) Tse Ying Suet	21–17, 21–9	(gold) Winner
2017	Bitburger Open	(Thailand) Jongkolphan Kititharakul	(Japan) Akane Araki (Japan) Aoi Matsuda	21–19, 21–6	(gold) Winner

BWF Grand Prix Gold tournament
BWF Grand Prix tournament

=== BWF International Challenge/Series (4 titles, 1 runner-up) ===
Women's singles
Year	Tournament	Opponent	Score	Result
2010	Smiling Fish International	(Thailand) Ratchanok Intanon	10–21, 17–21	(silver) Runner-up
2013	Smiling Fish International	(Malaysia) Ho Yen Mei	21–9, 21–19	(gold) Winner
2013	Singapore International	(Thailand) Pornpawee Chochuwong	21–12, 21–14	(gold) Winner

Women's doubles
Year	Tournament	Partner	Opponent	Score	Result
2015	Kharkiv International	(Thailand) Jongkolphan Kititharakul	(England) Heather Olver (England) Lauren Smith	21–18, 21–15	(gold) Winner
2015	Sydney International	(Thailand) Jongkolphan Kititharakul	(Australia) Setyana Mapasa (Australia) Gronya Somerville	21–13, 21–5	(gold) Winner

BWF International Challenge tournament
BWF International Series tournament
