= Jongkolphan Kititharakul =

Thai badminton player (born 1993)

Personal information
- Nickname: Gift
- Born: 1 March 1993 (age 33) Chiang Mai, Thailand
- Years active: 2010–2024
- Height: 1.71 m (5 ft 7 in)

Sport
- Country: Thailand
- Sport: Badminton
- Handedness: Right
- Retired: 13 August 2024

Women's & mixed doubles
- Highest ranking: 5 (WD with Rawinda Prajongjai, 20 December 2022); 25 (XD with Nipitphon Phuangphuapet, 30 March 2017)
- BWF profile
Medal record
Women's badminton
Representing Thailand
Sudirman Cup
Bronze medal – third place	2017 Gold Coast	Mixed team
Bronze medal – third place	2019 Nanning	Mixed team
Uber Cup
Silver medal – second place	2018 Bangkok	Women's team
Bronze medal – third place	2020 Aarhus	Women's team
Bronze medal – third place	2022 Bangkok	Women's team
Asian Games
Bronze medal – third place	2018 Jakarta–Palembang	Women's team
Bronze medal – third place	2022 Hangzhou	Women's team
Asian Championships
Bronze medal – third place	2023 Dubai	Women's doubles
Asia Mixed Team Championships
Bronze medal – third place	2017 Ho Chi Minh	Mixed team
Asia Team Championships
Silver medal – second place	2024 Selangor	Women's team
Bronze medal – third place	2016 Hyderabad	Women's team
Bronze medal – third place	2020 Manila	Women's team
SEA Games
Gold medal – first place	2015 Singapore	Women's team
Gold medal – first place	2017 Kuala Lumpur	Women's doubles
Gold medal – first place	2017 Kuala Lumpur	Women's team
Gold medal – first place	2019 Philippines	Women's team
Gold medal – first place	2021 Vietnam	Women's team
Gold medal – first place	2023 Cambodia	Women's team
Summer Universiade
Bronze medal – third place	2015 Gwangju	Mixed team

Jongkolphan Kititharakul (Thai: จงกลพรรณ กิติธรากุล; born 1 March 1993) is a Thai badminton player who specialized in doubles. She was the women's doubles gold medalist at the 2017 SEA Games, also part of the team that clinched the women's team gold medals in 2015, 2017, 2019, 2021 and 2023.

== Achievements ==
=== Asian Championships ===
Women's doubles
Year	Venue	Partner	Opponent	Score	Result
2023	Sheikh Rashid Bin Hamdan Indoor Hall; Dubai, United Arab Emirates	(Thailand) Rawinda Prajongjai	(Japan) Yuki Fukushima (Japan) Sayaka Hirota	18–21, 15–21	Bronze

=== SEA Games ===
Women's doubles
Year	Venue	Partner	Opponent	Score	Result
2017	Axiata Arena; Kuala Lumpur, Malaysia	(Thailand) Rawinda Prajongjai	(Thailand) Puttita Supajirakul (Thailand) Sapsiree Taerattanachai	21–16, 7–8 retired	Gold

=== BWF World Tour (4 titles, 6 runners-up) ===
The BWF World Tour, which was announced on 19 March 2017 and implemented in 2018, is a series of elite badminton tournaments sanctioned by the Badminton World Federation (BWF). The BWF World Tour is divided into levels of World Tour Finals, Super 1000, Super 750, Super 500, Super 300, and the BWF Tour Super 100.

Women's doubles
Year	Tournament	Level	Partner	Opponent	Score	Result
2018	Thailand Masters	Super 300	(Thailand) Rawinda Prajongjai	(Indonesia) Anggia Shitta Awanda (Indonesia) Ni Ketut Mahadewi Istarani	21–19, 21–17	(gold) Winner
2018	India Open	Super 500	(Thailand) Rawinda Prajongjai	(Indonesia) Greysia Polii (Indonesia) Apriyani Rahayu	18–21, 15–21	(silver) Runner-up
2019	Chinese Taipei Open	Super 300	(Thailand) Rawinda Prajongjai	(South Korea) Kim So-yeong (South Korea) Kong Hee-yong	21–19, 18–21, 28–26	(gold) Winner
2019	Macau Open	Super 300	(Thailand) Rawinda Prajongjai	(China) Du Yue (China) Li Yinhui	16–21, 21–10, 12–21	(silver) Runner-up
2020 (I)	Thailand Open	Super 1000	(Thailand) Rawinda Prajongjai	(Indonesia) Greysia Polii (Indonesia) Apriyani Rahayu	15–21, 12–21	(silver) Runner-up
2021	Orléans Masters	Super 100	(Thailand) Rawinda Prajongjai	(Bulgaria) Gabriela Stoeva (Bulgaria) Stefani Stoeva	21–16, 21–16	(gold) Winner
2022	Hylo Open	Super 300	(Thailand) Rawinda Prajongjai	(Thailand) Benyapa Aimsaard (Thailand) Nuntakarn Aimsaard	18–21, 21–18, 17–21	(silver) Runner-up
2023	Arctic Open	Super 500	(Thailand) Rawinda Prajongjai	(China) Liu Shengshu (China) Tan Ning	13–21, 22–24	(silver) Runner-up
2023	French Open	Super 750	(Thailand) Rawinda Prajongjai	(China) Liu Shengshu (China) Tan Ning	24–26, 19–21	(silver) Runner-up
2024	Thailand Open	Super 500	(Thailand) Rawinda Prajongjai	(Indonesia) Febriana Dwipuji Kusuma (Indonesia) Amallia Cahaya Pratiwi	21–14, 21–14	(gold) Winner

=== BWF Grand Prix (3 titles, 2 runners-up) ===
The BWF Grand Prix had two levels, the Grand Prix and Grand Prix Gold. It was a series of badminton tournaments sanctioned by the Badminton World Federation (BWF) and played between 2007 and 2017.

Women's doubles
Year	Tournament	Partner	Opponent	Score	Result
2015	Vietnam Open	(Thailand) Rawinda Prajongjai	(Indonesia) Suci Rizky Andini (Indonesia) Maretha Dea Giovani	21–14, 21–12	(gold) Winner
2016	Indonesian Masters	(Thailand) Rawinda Prajongjai	(South Korea) Chae Yoo-jung (South Korea) Kim So-yeong	18–21, 20–22	(silver) Runner-up
2016	Bitburger Open	(Thailand) Rawinda Prajongjai	(China) Chen Qingchen (China) Jia Yifan	12–21, 19–21	(silver) Runner-up
2017	Malaysia Masters	(Thailand) Rawinda Prajongjai	(Hong Kong) Poon Lok Yan (Hong Kong) Tse Ying Suet	21–17, 21–9	(gold) Winner
2017	Bitburger Open	(Thailand) Rawinda Prajongjai	(Japan) Akane Araki (Japan) Aoi Matsuda	21–19, 21–6	(gold) Winner

BWF Grand Prix Gold tournament
BWF Grand Prix tournament

=== BWF International Challenge/Series (3 titles, 2 runners-up) ===
Women's doubles
Year	Tournament	Partner	Opponent	Score	Result
2012	Bahrain International Challenge	(Thailand) Pacharakamol Arkornsakul	(Thailand) Rodjana Chuthabunditkul (Thailand) Chanida Julrattanamanee	14–21, 18–21	(silver) Runner-up
2013	Smiling Fish International	(Thailand) Rodjana Chuthabunditkul	(Thailand) Narissapat Lam (Thailand) Puttita Supajirakul	17–21, 10–21	(silver) Runner-up
2015	Kharkiv International	(Thailand) Rawinda Prajongjai	(England) Heather Olver (England) Lauren Smith	21–18, 21–15	(gold) Winner
2015	Sydney International	(Thailand) Rawinda Prajongjai	(Australia) Setyana Mapasa (Australia) Gronya Somerville	21–13, 21–5	(gold) Winner

Mixed doubles
Year	Tournament	Partner	Opponent	Score	Result
2013	Smiling Fish International	(Thailand) Patiphat Chalardchaleam	(Thailand) Wannawat Ampunsuwan (Thailand) Rodjana Chuthabunditkul	21–12, 21–11	(gold) Winner

BWF International Challenge tournament
BWF International Series tournament
