= 2023 BWF World Championships – Men's doubles =

Badminton championships

Men's doubles at the 2023 BWF World Championships
- Venue: Royal Arena
- Location: Copenhagen, Denmark
- Dates: 21–27 August
- Competitors: 96 from 29 nations

Medalists
gold medal	Kang Min-hyuk; Seo Seung-jae	South Korea
silver medal	Kim Astrup; Anders Skaarup Rasmussen	Denmark
bronze medal	Aaron Chia; Soh Wooi Yik	Malaysia
bronze medal	Liang Weikeng; Wang Chang	China

The men's doubles tournament of the 2023 BWF World Championships took place from 21 to 27 August 2023 at the Royal Arena in Copenhagen.

== Seeds ==
The seeding list was based on the World Rankings of 1 August 2023.

1. (Indonesia) Fajar Alfian / Muhammad Rian Ardianto (second round)
2. (India) Satwiksairaj Rankireddy / Chirag Shetty (quarter-finals)
3. (China) Liang Weikeng / Wang Chang (semi-finals)
4. (Malaysia) Aaron Chia / Soh Wooi Yik (semi-finals)
5. (Japan) Takuro Hoki / Yugo Kobayashi (third round)
6. (China) Liu Yuchen / Ou Xuanyi (quarter-finals)
7. (Malaysia) Ong Yew Sin / Teo Ee Yi (third round)
8. (Indonesia) Mohammad Ahsan / Hendra Setiawan (quarter-finals)

9. (South Korea) Kang Min-hyuk / Seo Seung-jae (champions)
10. (Indonesia) Leo Rolly Carnando / Daniel Marthin (third round)
11. (Denmark) Kim Astrup / Anders Skaarup Rasmussen (final)
12. (South Korea) Choi Sol-gyu / Kim Won-ho (withdrew)
13. (Indonesia) Muhammad Shohibul Fikri / Bagas Maulana (quarter-finals)
14. (Chinese Taipei) Lee Yang / Wang Chi-lin (third round)
15. (Chinese Taipei) Lu Ching-yao / Yang Po-han (third round)
16. (China) He Jiting / Zhou Haodong (third round)

Click on the seed number of a player to go to their draw section.

== Draw ==
The drawing ceremony was held on 10 August 2023.

=== Finals ===
Semi-finals
9	(South Korea) Kang Min-hyuk (South Korea) Seo Seung-jae	23	21
4	(Malaysia) Aaron Chia (Malaysia) Soh Wooi Yik	21	13
3	(China) Liang Weikeng (China) Wang Chang	21	18	19
11	(Denmark) Kim Astrup (Denmark) Anders Skaarup Rasmussen	17	21	21

Final
9	(South Korea) Kang Min-hyuk (South Korea) Seo Seung-jae	14	21	21
11	(Denmark) Kim Astrup (Denmark) Anders Skaarup Rasmussen	21	15	17

=== Top half ===
==== Section 1 ====
First round
(Chinese Taipei) Lee J-h (Chinese Taipei) Yang P-hs	21	25
(England) R Easton (England) Z Russ	12	23
(South Africa) J Elliott (South Africa) R Summers	17	13
(Philippines) C Bernardo (Philippines) A Morada	21	21
(Italy) G Greco (Italy) D Salutt	21	21
(Peru) J Guevara (Peru) D Mini	14	7
(Czech Republic) O Král (Czech Republic) A Mendrek	17	21	21
(Norway) T Flåtten (Norway) V Rikheim	21	9	11

Second round
1	(Indonesia) F Alfian (Indonesia) M R Ardianto	18	19
(Chinese Taipei) Lee J-h (Chinese Taipei) Yang P-hs	21	21
9	(South Korea) Kang M-h (South Korea) Seo S-j	21	21
(Philippines) C Bernardo (Philippines) A Morada	10	13
8	(Indonesia) M Ahsan (Indonesia) H Setiawan	21	21
(Italy) G Greco (Italy) D Salutt	11	14
16	(China) He JT (China) Zhou HD	21	21
(Czech Republic) O Král (Czech Republic) A Mendrek	9	19

Third round
(Chinese Taipei) Lee J-h (Chinese Taipei) Yang P-hs	19	21	15
9	(South Korea) Kang M-h (South Korea) Seo S-j	21	13	21
8	(Indonesia) M Ahsan (Indonesia) H Setiawan	21	21
16	(China) He JT (China) Zhou HD	15	10

Quarter-finals
9	(South Korea) Kang M-h (South Korea) Seo S-j	21	21
8	(Indonesia) M Ahsan (Indonesia) H Setiawan	19	17

==== Section 2 ====
First round
(Bulgaria) I Rusev (Bulgaria) I Stoynov	14	15
(Denmark) J Bay (Denmark) L Mølhede	21	21
(Brazil) Fa Farias (Brazil) Fr Farias	17	7
(Japan) A Koga (Japan) T Saito	21	21
(Azerbaijan) A R Dwicahyo (Azerbaijan) A Qowimuramadhoni	13	12
(Thailand) S Jomkoh (Thailand) K Kedren	21	21
(Canada) K Lee (Canada) T A Lindeman	21	16	24
(Scotland) C Grimley (Scotland) M Grimley	18	21	22

Second round
4	(Malaysia) A Chia (Malaysia) Soh W Y	18	21	21
(Denmark) J Bay (Denmark) L Mølhede	21	14	16
14	(Chinese Taipei) Lee Y (Chinese Taipei) Wang C-l	22	21
(Japan) A Koga (Japan) T Saito	20	16
6	(China) Liu YC (China) Ou XY	21	21
(Thailand) S Jomkoh (Thailand) K Kedren	16	19
15	(Chinese Taipei) Lu C-y (Chinese Taipei) Yang P-ha	21	21
(Canada) K Lee (Canada) T A Lindeman	16	14

Third round
4	(Malaysia) A Chia (Malaysia) Soh W Y	21	21
14	(Chinese Taipei) Lee Y (Chinese Taipei) Wang C-l	16	18
6	(China) Liu YC (China) Ou XY	24	21
15	(Chinese Taipei) Lu C-y (Chinese Taipei) Yang P-ha	22	16

Quarter-finals
4	(Malaysia) A Chia (Malaysia) Soh W Y	21	15	21
6	(China) Liu YC (China) Ou XY	10	21	14

=== Bottom half ===
==== Section 3 ====
First round
(Mexico) J Castillo (Mexico) L Montoya	15	10
(Germany) B Geiss (Germany) J C Völker	21	21
(Singapore) A Kwek (Singapore) Loh K H	12	21	14
(China) Ren XY (China) Tan Q	21	10	21
(Malaysia) Man W C (Malaysia) Tee K W	21	21
(France) L Corvée (France) R Labar	17	18
(Germany) M Lamsfuß (Germany) M Seidel	18	18
(France) C Popov (France) T J Popov	21	21

Second round
(Germany) B Geiss (Germany) J C Völker	12	16
13	(Indonesia) M S Fikri (Indonesia) B Maulana	21	21
(China) Ren XY (China) Tan Q	12	10
5	(Japan) T Hoki (Japan) Y Kobayashi	21	21
(Malaysia) Man W C (Malaysia) Tee K W	w	/	o
12	(South Korea) Choi S-g (South Korea) Kim W-h
(France) C Popov (France) T J Popov	12	13
3	(China) Liang WK (China) Wang C	21	21

Third round
13	(Indonesia) M S Fikri (Indonesia) B Maulana	22	21
5	(Japan) T Hoki (Japan) Y Kobayashi	20	18
(Malaysia) Man W C (Malaysia) Tee K W	16	21	17
3	(China) Liang WK (China) Wang C	21	14	21

Quarter-finals
13	(Indonesia) M S Fikri (Indonesia) B Maulana	18	21	14
3	(China) Liang WK (China) Wang C	21	15	21

==== Section 4 ====
First round
(Scotland) A Dunn (Scotland) A Hall	21	0
(Canada) A Dong (Canada) N Yakura	10	0^{r}
(Thailand) P Kaosamaang (Thailand) W Thongsa-nga	21	21
(United States) V Chiu (United States) J Yuan	18	11
(England) B Lane (England) S Vendy	21	21
(Guatemala) A Marroquín (Guatemala) J Solís	5	6
(Republic of Ireland) J Magee (Republic of Ireland) P Reynolds	21	16	22
(Australia) K Choo (Australia) Lim M C	14	21	24

Second round
(Scotland) A Dunn (Scotland) A Hall	12	12
11	(Denmark) K Astrup (Denmark) A S Rasmussen	21	21
(Thailand) P Kaosamaang (Thailand) W Thongsa-nga	16	21	12
7	(Malaysia) Ong Y S (Malaysia) Teo E Y	21	18	21
(England) B Lane (England) S Vendy	21	19	10
10	(Indonesia) L R Carnando (Indonesia) D Marthin	18	21	21
(Australia) K Choo (Australia) Lim M C	16	9
2	(India) S Rankireddy (India) C Shetty	21	21

Third round
11	(Denmark) K Astrup (Denmark) A S Rasmussen	21	21
7	(Malaysia) Ong Y S (Malaysia) Teo E Y	15	10
10	(Indonesia) L R Carnando (Indonesia) D Marthin	15	21	9
2	(India) S Rankireddy (India) C Shetty	21	19	21

Quarter-finals
11	(Denmark) K Astrup (Denmark) A S Rasmussen	21	21
2	(India) S Rankireddy (India) C Shetty	18	19

== Qualifiers' performances ==
The table below lists out all the qualifiers of this edition by 22 July 2023.

Pair	Date of birth	Pair statistics			Individual statistics			Note
Pair	Date of birth	Appearance	Best Performance(s)		Appearance	Best Performance(s)		Note
Pair	Date of birth	Appearance	Edition(s)	Result	Appearance	Edition(s)	Result	Note
Champions
(South Korea) Kang Min-hyuk	17 February 1999 (aged 24)	Debut			2nd	22	1R	PB
(South Korea) Seo Seung-jae	4 September 1997 (aged 25)	Debut			3rd	19, 22	QF	PB
Finalist
(Denmark) Kim Astrup	6 March 1992 (aged 31)	8th	21	B	8th	21	B	Reigning European champion, and most participated pair, =PB
(Denmark) Anders Skaarup Rasmussen	15 February 1989 (aged 34)	8th	21	B	8th	21	B	Reigning European champion, and most participated pair, =PB
Semi-finalist
(China) Liang Weikeng	30 November 2000 (aged 22)	Debut			Debut			PB
(China) Wang Chang	7 May 2001 (aged 22)	Debut			2nd	21	1R	PB
(Malaysia) Aaron Chia	24 February 1997 (aged 26)	5th	22	G	5th	22	G	Reigning world champion
(Malaysia) Soh Wooi Yik	17 February 1998 (aged 25)	5th	22	G	5th	22	G	Reigning world champion
Quarter-finalist
(China) Liu Yuchen	25 July 1995 (aged 28)	Debut			5th	18	G	
(China) Ou Xuanyi	23 January 1994 (aged 29)	Debut			2nd	21	2R	PB
(India) Satwiksairaj Rankireddy	13 August 2000 (aged 23)	5th	22	B	5th	22	B	Reigning Asian champion
(India) Chirag Shetty	4 July 1997 (aged 26)	5th	22	B	5th	22	B	Reigning Asian champion
(Indonesia) Mohammad Ahsan	7 September 1987 (aged 35)	5th	13, 15, 19	G	8th	13, 15, 19	G	Most participated qualifier
(Indonesia) Hendra Setiawan	25 August 1984 (aged 38)	5th	13, 15, 19	G	8th	07, 13, 15, 19	G	Oldest and most participated qualifier
(Indonesia) Muhammad Shohibul Fikri	15 November 1999 (aged 23)	2nd	22	2R	2nd	22	2R	PB
(Indonesia) Bagas Maulana	20 July 1998 (aged 25)	2nd	22	2R	2nd	22	2R	PB
Third rounders
(China) He Jiting	19 February 1998 (aged 25)	Debut			4th	21	S	
(China) Zhou Haodong	20 February 1998 (aged 25)	Debut			3rd	19	3R	=PB
(Chinese Taipei) Lee Jhe-huei	20 March 1994 (aged 29)	3rd	21, 22	2R	4th	18, 21, 22	2R	PB
(Chinese Taipei) Yang Po-hsuan	23 August 1996 (aged 26)	3rd	21, 22	2R	3rd	21, 22	2R	PB
(Chinese Taipei) Lee Yang	12 August 1995 (aged 28)	4th	21	QF	5th	21	QF	Reigning Olympic champion
(Chinese Taipei) Wang Chi-lin	18 January 1995 (aged 28)	4th	21	QF	6th	18	B	Reigning Olympic champion
(Chinese Taipei) Lu Ching-yao	7 June 1993 (aged 30)	5th	17	3R	5th	17	3R	=PB
(Chinese Taipei) Yang Po-han	13 March 1994 (aged 29)	5th	17	3R	5th	17	3R	=PB
(Indonesia) Leo Rolly Carnando	29 July 2001 (aged 22)	Debut			Debut			PB
(Indonesia) Daniel Marthin	31 July 2001 (aged 22)	Debut			Debut			PB
(Japan) Takuro Hoki	14 August 1995 (aged 28)	6th	21	G2	6th	21	G	
(Japan) Yugo Kobayashi	10 July 1995 (aged 28)	6th	21	G2	6th	21	G	
(Malaysia) Man Wei Chong	25 August 1999 (aged 23)	Debut			Debut			PB
(Malaysia) Tee Kai Wun	17 April 2000 (aged 23)	Debut			Debut			PB
(Malaysia) Ong Yew Sin	30 January 1995 (aged 28)	5th	21	B	5th	21	B	
(Malaysia) Teo Ee Yi	4 April 1993 (aged 30)	5th	21	B	5th	21	B	
Second rounders
(Australia) Kenneth Choo	1 April 1997 (aged 26)	Debut			Debut			Reigning Oceanian champion, PB
(Australia) Lim Ming Chuen	26 July 1995 (aged 28)	Debut			Debut			PB
(Canada) Kevin Lee	10 November 1998 (aged 24)	Debut			Debut			PB
(Canada) Ty Alexander Lindeman	15 August 1997 (aged 26)	Debut			Debut			PB
(China) Ren Xiangyu	23 October 1998 (aged 24)	Debut			Debut			PB
(China) Tan Qiang	16 September 1998 (aged 24)	Debut			4th	21	S	
(Czech Republic) Ondřej Král	15 April 1999 (aged 24)	2nd	22	1R	2nd	22	1R	PB
(Czech Republic) Adam Mendrek	14 November 1995 (aged 27)	2nd	22	1R	2nd	22	1R	PB
(Denmark) Jeppe Bay	4 March 1997 (aged 26)	2nd	22	3R	2nd	22	3R	
(Denmark) Lasse Mølhede	25 October 1993 (aged 29)	2nd	22	3R	2nd	22	3R	
(England) Ben Lane	13 July 1997 (aged 26)	4th	22	QF	4th	22	QF	
(England) Sean Vendy	18 May 1996 (aged 27)	4th	22	QF	4th	22	QF	
(France) Christo Popov	8 March 2002 (aged 21)	2nd	22	1R	2nd	22	1R	PB
(France) Toma Junior Popov	29 September 1998 (aged 24)	2nd	22	1R	2nd	22	1R	PB
(Germany) Bjarne Geiss	29 November 1997 (aged 25)	4th	21	3R	4th	21	3R	
(Germany) Jan Colin Völker	26 February 1998 (aged 25)	4th	21	3R	4th	21	3R	
(Indonesia) Fajar Alfian	7 March 1996 (aged 27)	4th	19, 22	B	4th	19, 22	B	
(Indonesia) Muhammad Rian Ardianto	13 February 1996 (aged 27)	4th	19, 22	B	4th	19, 22	B	
(Italy) Giovanni Greco	11 April 1990 (aged 33)	Debut			3rd	15, 21	1R	PB
(Italy) David Salutt	31 December 1998 (aged 24)	Debut			Debut			PB
(Japan) Akira Koga	8 August 1994 (aged 29)	3rd	21	3R	3rd	22	3R	
(Japan) Taichi Saito	21 April 1993 (aged 30)	3rd	21	3R	3rd	22	3R	
(Philippines) Christian Bernardo	25 July 1998 (aged 25)	Debut			Debut			PB
(Philippines) Alvin Morada	12 April 1997 (aged 26)	Debut			Debut			PB
(Scotland) Alexander Dunn	13 September 1998 (aged 24)	5th	19, 22	3R	5th	19	3R	
(Scotland) Adam Hall	12 February 1996 (aged 27)	5th	19, 22	3R	5th	19, 22	3R	
(Thailand) Supak Jomkoh	4 September 1996 (aged 26)	2nd	22	1R	2nd	22	1R	PB
(Thailand) Kittinupong Kedren	19 July 1996 (aged 27)	2nd	22	1R	4th	15	2R	=PB
(Thailand) Pharanyu Kaosamaang	6 March 2003 (aged 20)	Debut			Debut			PB
(Thailand) Worrapol Thongsa-nga	29 October 1995 (aged 27)	Debut			Debut			PB
First rounders
(Azerbaijan) Ade Resky Dwicahyo	13 May 1998 (aged 25)	Debut			Debut			PB
(Azerbaijan) Azmy Qowimuramadhoni	1 January 1999 (aged 24)	Debut			Debut			PB
(Brazil) Fabrício Farias	8 May 2000 (aged 23)	3rd	21, 22	1R	3rd	21, 22	1R	=PB
(Brazil) Francielton Farias	8 May 2000 (aged 23)	3rd	21, 22	1R	3rd	21, 22	1R	=PB
(Bulgaria) Ivan Rusev	6 May 1993 (aged 30)	Debut			2nd	18	1R	=PB
(Bulgaria) Iliyan Stoynov	25 January 2001 (aged 22)	Debut			Debut			PB
(Canada) Adam Dong	14 February 1994 (aged 29)	Debut			Debut			Reigning Pan America champion, PB
(Canada) Nyl Yakura	14 February 1993 (aged 30)	Debut			5th	19	2R	Reigning Pan America champion
(England) Rory Easton	16 January 2001 (aged 22)	Debut			Debut			PB
(England) Zach Russ	3 July 2000 (aged 23)	Debut			Debut			PB
(France) Lucas Corvée	9 June 1993 (aged 30)	2nd	22	2R	3rd	22	2R	
(France) Ronan Labar	3 May 1989 (aged 34)	2nd	22	2R	8th	15, 17, 22	2R	Most participated qualifier
(Germany) Mark Lamsfuß	19 April 1994 (aged 29)	6th	21	QF	6th	21	QF	
(Germany) Marvin Seidel	9 November 1995 (aged 27)	6th	21	QF	6th	21	QF	
(Guatemala) Aníbal Marroquín	7 November 1992 (aged 30)	2nd	22	2R	2nd	22	2R	
(Guatemala) Jonathan Solís	21 August 1993 (aged 30)	2nd	22	2R	2nd	22	2R	
(Mexico) Job Castillo	1 November 1992 (aged 30)	2nd	22	2R	2nd	22	2R	
(Mexico) Luis Montoya	8 December 2000 (aged 22)	2nd	22	2R	2nd	22	2R	
(Norway) Torjus Flåtten	25 June 1997 (aged 26)	3rd	21	3R	3rd	21	3R	
(Norway) Vegard Rikheim	28 September 1997 (aged 25)	3rd	21	3R	3rd	21	3R	
(Peru) José Guevara	6 October 1998 (aged 24)	Debut			Debut			PB
(Peru) Diego Mini	13 April 1999 (aged 24)	Debut			Debut			PB
(Republic of Ireland) Joshua Magee	3 November 1994 (aged 28)	4th	22	2R	5th	22	2R	
(Republic of Ireland) Paul Reynolds	8 March 1999 (aged 24)	4th	22	2R	4th	22	2R	
(Scotland) Christopher Grimley	6 February 2000 (aged 23)	3rd	21	3R	3rd	21	3R	
(Scotland) Matthew Grimley	6 February 2000 (aged 23)	3rd	21	3R	3rd	21	3R	
(Singapore) Andy Kwek	22 April 1999 (aged 24)	Debut			Debut			PB
(Singapore) Loh Kean Hean	12 March 1995 (aged 28)	Debut			3rd	22	3R	
(South Africa) Jarred Elliott	26 January 2000 (aged 23)	Debut			Debut			Reigning African champion, PB
(South Africa) Robert Summers	13 May 2002 (aged 21)	Debut			Debut			Reigning African champion, PB
(United States) Vinson Chiu	8 August 1998 (aged 25)	Debut			Debut			PB
(United States) Joshua Yuan	25 July 2003 (aged 20)	Debut			Debut			Youngest qualifier, PB
Withdrew
(South Korea) Choi Sol-gyu	5 August 1995 (aged 28)	—			–	19, 22	QF	
(South Korea) Kim Won-ho	2 June 1999 (aged 24)	—			–			
