= 2022 BWF World Championships – Men's doubles =

Badminton tournament in Japan

Men's doubles at the 2022 BWF World Championships
- Venue: Tokyo Metropolitan Gymnasium
- Location: Tokyo, Japan
- Dates: 22–28 August
- Competitors: 46 from 25 nations

Medalists
gold medal	Aaron Chia; Soh Wooi Yik	Malaysia
silver medal	Mohammad Ahsan; Hendra Setiawan	Indonesia
bronze medal	Fajar Alfian; Muhammad Rian Ardianto	Indonesia
bronze medal	Satwiksairaj Rankireddy; Chirag Shetty	India

The men's doubles tournament of the 2022 BWF World Championships took place from 22 to 28 August 2022 at the Tokyo Metropolitan Gymnasium in Tokyo.

== Seeds ==
The seeding list was based on the World Rankings of 9 August 2022.

1. (Indonesia) Marcus Fernaldi Gideon / Kevin Sanjaya Sukamuljo (third round)
2. (Japan) Takuro Hoki / Yugo Kobayashi (quarter-finals)
3. (Indonesia) Mohammad Ahsan / Hendra Setiawan (final)
4. (Chinese Taipei) Lee Yang / Wang Chi-lin (third round)
5. (Indonesia) Fajar Alfian / Muhammad Rian Ardianto (semi-finals)
6. (Malaysia) Aaron Chia / Soh Wooi Yik (champions)
7. (India) Satwiksairaj Rankireddy / Chirag Shetty (semi-finals)
8. (Denmark) Kim Astrup / Anders Skaarup Rasmussen (second round)

9. (Malaysia) Ong Yew Sin / Teo Ee Yi (second round)
10. (South Korea) Choi Sol-gyu / Seo Seung-jae (quarter-finals)
11. (Malaysia) Goh Sze Fei / Nur Izzudin (third round)
12. (Germany) Mark Lamsfuß / Marvin Seidel (third round)
13. (Malaysia) Goh V Shem / Tan Wee Kiong (second round)
14. (England) Ben Lane / Sean Vendy (quarter-finals)
15. (Indonesia) Muhammad Shohibul Fikri / Bagas Maulana (second round)
16. (Japan) Akira Koga / Taichi Saito (third round)

Click on the seed number of a player to go to their draw section.

== Draw ==
=== Finals ===
Semi-finals
5	(Indonesia) Fajar Alfian (Indonesia) Muhammad Rian Ardianto	21	21	16
3	(Indonesia) Mohammad Ahsan (Indonesia) Hendra Setiawan	23	12	21
6	(Malaysia) Aaron Chia (Malaysia) Soh Wooi Yik	20	21	21
7	(India) Satwiksairaj Rankireddy (India) Chirag Shetty	22	18	16

Final
3	(Indonesia) Mohammad Ahsan (Indonesia) Hendra Setiawan	19	14
6	(Malaysia) Aaron Chia (Malaysia) Soh Wooi Yik	21	21

=== Top half ===
==== Section 1 ====
First Round
(Ukraine) G Beketov (Ukraine) M Makhnovskiy	14	24
(Czech Republic) J Janáček (Czech Republic) T Švejda	21	26
(Germany) B Geiss (Germany) J C Völker	21	22
(Norway) T Flåtten (Norway) V Rikheim	17	20
(Japan) H Okamura (Japan) M Onodera	21	19	21
(India) M Attri (India) B. S Reddy	11	21	15
(South Korea) Kang M-h (South Korea) Kim J-h	12	7
(Japan) K Matsui (Japan) Y Takeuchi	21	21

Second Round
1	(Indonesia) M F Gideon (Indonesia) K S Sukamuljo	21	21
(Czech Republic) J Janáček (Czech Republic) T Švejda	14	13
14	(England) B Lane (England) S Vendy	21	21
(Germany) B Geiss (Germany) J C Völker	15	10
5	(Indonesia) F Alfian (Indonesia) M R Ardianto	21	21
(Japan) H Okamura (Japan) M Onodera	13	10
16	(Japan) A Koga (Japan) T Saito	21	19	21
(Japan) K Matsui (Japan) Y Takeuchi	17	21	15

Third Round
1	(Indonesia) M F Gideon (Indonesia) K S Sukamuljo	15	9
14	(England) B Lane (England) S Vendy	21	21
5	(Indonesia) F Alfian (Indonesia) M R Ardianto	21	21
16	(Japan) A Koga (Japan) T Saito	19	16

Quarter-finals
14	(England) B Lane (England) S Vendy	11	16
5	(Indonesia) F Alfian (Indonesia) M R Ardianto	21	21

==== Section 2 ====
First Round
(France) L Corvée (France) R Labar	21	21
(Egypt) A H Elgamal (Egypt) A Salah	11	13
(Scotland) C Grimley (Scotland) M Grimley	21	21
(Czech Republic) O Král (Czech Republic) A Mendrek	19	16
(Thailand) S Jomkoh (Thailand) K Kedren	17	21	20
(India) Arjun M. R. (India) D Kapila	21	17	22
(France) C Popov (France) T J Popov	17	18
(Singapore) T Hee (Singapore) Loh K H	21	21

Second Round
3	(Indonesia) M Ahsan (Indonesia) H Setiawan	21	21
(France) L Corvée (France) R Labar	15	16
12	(Germany) M Lamsfuß (Germany) M Seidel	21	21
(Scotland) C Grimley (Scotland) M Grimley	10	13
8	(Denmark) K Astrup (Denmark) A S Rasmussen	17	16
(India) Arjun M. R. (India) D Kapila	21	21
9	(Malaysia) Ong Y S (Malaysia) Teo E Y	20	20
(Singapore) T Hee (Singapore) Loh K H	22	22

Third Round
3	(Indonesia) M Ahsan (Indonesia) H Setiawan	21	23
12	(Germany) M Lamsfuß (Germany) M Seidel	18	21
(India) Arjun M. R. (India) D Kapila	18	21	21
(Singapore) T Hee (Singapore) Loh K H	21	15	16

Quarter-finals
3	(Indonesia) M Ahsan (Indonesia) H Setiawan	21	21
(India) Arjun M. R. (India) D Kapila	8	14

=== Bottom half ===
==== Section 3 ====
First Round
(Republic of Ireland) J Magee (Republic of Ireland) P Reynolds	21	21
(Brazil) Fa Farias (Brazil) Fr Farias	18	19
(Spain) J Monroy (Spain) C Piris	11	9
(Chinese Taipei) Lu C-y (Chinese Taipei) Yang P-ha	21	21
(England) C Hemming (England) S Stallwood	w	/	o
(Mauritius) A Lubah (Mauritius) J Paul	w	/	o
(Chinese Taipei) Lee J-h (Chinese Taipei) Yang P-hs	21	21
(Netherlands) R Jille (Netherlands) T van der Lecq	14	17

Second Round
(Republic of Ireland) J Magee (Republic of Ireland) P Reynolds	13	12
11	(Malaysia) Goh S F (Malaysia) N Izzuddin	21	21
(Chinese Taipei) Lu C-y (Chinese Taipei) Yang P-ha	20	18
6	(Malaysia) A Chia (Malaysia) Soh W Y	22	21
10	(South Korea) Choi S-g (South Korea) Seo S-j	w	/	o
(Chinese Taipei) Lee J-h (Chinese Taipei) Yang P-hs	18	21	13
4	(Chinese Taipei) Lee Y (Chinese Taipei) Wang C-l	21	15	21

Third Round
11	(Malaysia) Goh S F (Malaysia) N Izzuddin	17	19
6	(Malaysia) A Chia (Malaysia) Soh W Y	21	21
10	(South Korea) Choi S-g (South Korea) Seo S-j	21	16	21
4	(Chinese Taipei) Lee Y (Chinese Taipei) Wang C-l	17	21	14

Quarter-finals
6	(Malaysia) A Chia (Malaysia) Soh W Y	21	21
10	(South Korea) Choi S-g (South Korea) Seo S-j	18	16

==== Section 4 ====
First Round
(Denmark) L Mølhede (Denmark) J Bay	21	18	25
(Sri Lanka) S Dias (Sri Lanka) B Goonethilleka	11	21	23
(Guatemala) A Marroquín (Guatemala) J Solís	21	21
(New Zealand) J Curtin (New Zealand) D Soedjasa	9	14
(Scotland) A Dunn (Scotland) A Hall	21	21
(Mexico) J Castillo (Mexico) L Montoya	10	12
(France) F Delrue (France) W Villeger	21	21
(India) K P Garaga (India) V G Panjala	14	18

Second Round
(Denmark) L Mølhede (Denmark) J Bay	21	23
13	(Malaysia) Goh V S (Malaysia) Tan W K	18	21
(Guatemala) A Marroquín (Guatemala) J Solís	8	10
7	(India) S Rankireddy (India) C Shetty	21	21
(Scotland) A Dunn (Scotland) A Hall	17	21	21
15	(Indonesia) M S Fikri (Indonesia) B Maulana	21	19	15
(France) F Delrue (France) W Villeger	17	12
2	(Japan) T Hoki (Japan) Y Kobayashi	21	21

Third Round
(Denmark) L Mølhede (Denmark) J Bay	12	10
7	(India) S Rankireddy (India) C Shetty	21	21
(Scotland) A Dunn (Scotland) A Hall	12	14
2	(Japan) T Hoki (Japan) Y Kobayashi	21	21

Quarter-finals
7	(India) S Rankireddy (India) C Shetty	24	15	21
2	(Japan) T Hoki (Japan) Y Kobayashi	22	21	14
