= 2020 Badminton Asia Team Championships men's team squads =

This article lists the latest men's squads lists for badminton's 2020 Badminton Asia Team Championships. Rankings stated are based on world ranking date for 4 February 2020 as per the tournament's prospectus.

== Group A ==
Group A consists of Indonesia and Korea.

=== Indonesia ===
Name	DoB/Age	MS Rank	MD Rank
Anthony Sinisuka Ginting	20 October 1996 (aged 23)	5	-
Jonatan Christie	15 September 1997 (aged 22)	7	-
Shesar Hiren Rhustavito	3 March 1994 (aged 25)	20	-
Firman Abdul Kholik	11 August 1997 (aged 22)	104	-
Marcus Fernaldi Gideon	9 March 1991 (aged 28)	-	1
Kevin Sanjaya Sukamuljo	2 August 1995 (aged 24)	-	1
Mohammad Ahsan	7 September 1987 (aged 32)	-	2
Hendra Setiawan	25 August 1984 (aged 35)	-	2
Fajar Alfian	7 March 1995 (aged 24)	-	5
Muhammad Rian Ardianto	13 February 1996 (aged 23)	-	5

=== Korea ===
Name	DoB/Age	MS Rank	MD Rank
Heo Kwang-hee	11 August 1995 (aged 24)	34	-
Son Wan-ho	17 May 1988 (aged 31)	70	-
Kim Dong-hoon	15 February 2001 (aged 18)	87	-
Cho Geon-yeop	1 April 1996 (aged 23)	1265	-
Choi Sol-gyu	5 August 1995 (aged 24)	-	9
Seo Seung-jae	4 September 1997 (aged 22)	-	9
Na Sung-seung	28 August 1999 (aged 20)	-	48
Wang Chan	7 September 2000 (aged 19)	-	48
Kim Won-ho	2 June 1999 (aged 20)	-	50
Park Kyung-hoon	12 January 1998 (aged 22)	-	50

== Group B ==
Group B consists of India, Malaysia, and Kazakhstan.

=== India ===
Name	DoB/Age	MS Rank	MD Rank
B. Sai Praneeth	10 August 1992 (aged 27)	11	-
Srikanth Kidambi	7 February 1993 (aged 27)	12	-
Prannoy Kumar	17 July 1992 (aged 27)	27	-
Lakshya Sen	16 August 2001 (aged 18)	30	-
Subhankar Dey	6 June 1993 (aged 26)	46	-
Satwiksairaj Rankireddy	13 August 2000 (aged 19)	-	10
Chirag Shetty	4 July 1997 (aged 22)	-	10
Arjun M.R.	11 May 1997 (aged 22)	-	125
Dhruv Kapila	1 February 2000 (aged 20)	-	125

=== Malaysia ===
Name	DoB/Age	MS Rank	MD Rank
Lee Zii Jia	29 March 1998 (aged 21)	14	-
Cheam June Wei	23 January 1997 (aged 23)	72	-
Ng Tze Yong	16 May 2000 (aged 19)	136	-
Leong Jun Hao	13 July 1999 (aged 20)	181	-
Aaron Chia	24 February 1997 (aged 22)	-	8
Soh Wooi Yik	17 February 1998 (aged 21)	-	8
Ong Yew Sin	30 January 1995 (aged 25)	-	17
Teo Ee Yi	4 April 1993 (aged 26)	-	17
Goh Sze Fei	18 August 1997 (aged 22)	-	25
Nur Izzuddin	11 November 1997 (aged 22)	-	25

=== Kazakhstan ===
Name	DoB/Age	MS Rank	MD Rank
Dmitriy Panarin	8 January 2000 (aged 20)	264	208
Artur Niyazov	30 August 1993 (aged 26)	418	208
Khaitmurat Kulmatov	19 February 1996 (aged 23)	552	328
Nikita Bragin	1 April 1988 (aged 31)	843	696
Damir Abdullayev	28 May 2002 (aged 17)	1289	696
Yerzhakanov Samat		-	696

== Group C ==
Group C consists of Chinese Taipei, Singapore, and the Philippines.

=== Chinese Taipei ===
Name	DoB/Age	MS Rank	MD Rank
Chou Tien-chen	8 January 1990 (aged 30)	2	-
Wang Tzu-wei	27 February 1995 (aged 24)	16	-
Chen Shiau-cheng	14 February 2000 (aged 19)	213	-
Hsueh Hsuan-yi	26 October 1985 (aged 34)	286	-
Lee Yang	12 August 1995 (aged 24)	-	7
Wang Chi-lin	18 January 1995 (aged 25)	-	7
Liao Min-chun	27 January 1988 (aged 32)	-	16
Su Ching-heng	10 November 1992 (aged 27)	-	16
Lu Ching-yao	7 June 1993 (aged 26)	-	19
Yang Po-han	13 March 1994 (aged 25)	-	19

=== Singapore ===
Name	DoB/Age	MS Rank	MD Rank
Loh Kean Yew	26 June 1997 (aged 22)	37	-
Jason Teh Jia Heng	25 August 2000 (aged 19)	371	-
Lee Wei Hong	27 June 2000 (aged 19)	761	-
Loh Kean Hean	12 March 1995 (aged 24)	-	73
Abel Tan Wen Xing	3 October 2000 (aged 19)	-	142
Toh Han Zhuo	22 December 2000 (aged 19)	-	142
Andy Kwek Jun Liang	22 April 1999 (aged 20)	-	484
Darrion Michael Ng Weng Soong	1 April 2001 (aged 18)	-	498
Aaron Yong Chuan Shen	19 January 2001 (aged 19)	-	696
Howin Wong Jia Hao	17 April 2001 (aged 18)	-	696

=== Philippines ===
Name	DoB/Age	MS Rank	MD Rank
Ros Leonard Pedrosa	6 July 1996 (aged 23)	428	-
Lanz Ralf Zafra	8 September 2001 (aged 18)	509	-
Solomon Jr. Padiz	13 November 2000 (aged 19)	744	-
Arthur Samuel Salvado	5 January 2001 (aged 19)	1063	-
Peter Gabriel Magnaye	9 April 1992 (aged 27)	-	189
Alvin Morada	12 April 1997 (aged 22)	-	189
Philip Joper Escueta	23 August 1993 (aged 26)	-	195
Paul John Pantig	25 September 1995 (aged 24)	-	195

== Group D ==
Group D consists of Japan and Thailand.

=== Japan ===
Name	DoB/Age	MS Rank	MD Rank
Kanta Tsuneyama	21 June 1996 (aged 23)	10	-
Kenta Nishimoto	30 August 1994 (aged 25)	13	-
Koki Watanabe	29 January 1999 (aged 21)	40	-
Kodai Naraoka	30 June 2001 (aged 18)	44	-
Hiroyuki Endo	16 December 1986 (aged 33)	-	6
Yuta Watanabe	13 June 1997 (aged 22)	-	6
Takuro Hoki	14 August 1995 (aged 24)	-	13
Yugo Kobayashi	10 July 1995 (aged 24)	-	13
Akira Koga	8 March 1994 (aged 25)	-	31
Taichi Saito	21 April 1993 (aged 26)	-	31

=== Thailand ===
Name	DoB/Age	MS Rank	MD Rank
Kantaphon Wangcharoen	18 September 1998 (aged 21)	12	-
Sitthikom Thammasin	7 April 1995 (aged 24)	26	-
Khosit Phetpradab	8 July 1994 (aged 25)	32	-
Kunlavut Vitidsarn	11 May 2001 (aged 18)	39	-
Suppanyu Avihingsanon	24 October 1989 (aged 30)	47	-
Bodin Isara	12 December 1990 (aged 29)	-	42
Maneepong Jongjit	21 March 1991 (aged 28)	-	42
Kittinupong Kedren	19 July 1996 (aged 23)	-	107
Nipitphon Phuangphuapet	31 May 1991 (aged 28)	-	208
Tanupat Viriyangkura	10 March 1996 (aged 23)	-	208
