= 2019 BWF World Championships – Men's doubles =

Men's doubles at the 2019 BWF World Championships
- Venue: St. Jakobshalle
- Location: Basel, Switzerland
- Dates: 19–25 August

Medalists
gold medal	Mohammad Ahsan; Hendra Setiawan	Indonesia
silver medal	Takuro Hoki; Yugo Kobayashi	Japan
bronze medal	Fajar Alfian; Muhammad Rian Ardianto	Indonesia
bronze medal	Li Junhui; Liu Yuchen	China

The men's doubles tournament of the 2019 BWF World Championships (World Badminton Championships) takes place from 19 to 25 August.

== Seeds ==
The seeding list is based on the World Rankings from 30 July 2019.

1. (Indonesia) Marcus Fernaldi Gideon / Kevin Sanjaya Sukamuljo (second round)
2. (China) Li Junhui / Liu Yuchen (semifinals)
3. (Japan) Takeshi Kamura / Keigo Sonoda (quarterfinals)
4. (Indonesia) Mohammad Ahsan / Hendra Setiawan (champions)
5. (Japan) Hiroyuki Endo / Yuta Watanabe (second round)
6. (China) Han Chengkai / Zhou Haodong (third round)
7. (Indonesia) Fajar Alfian / Muhammad Rian Ardianto (semifinals)
8. (Denmark) Kim Astrup / Anders Skaarup Rasmussen (third round)

9. (Malaysia) Aaron Chia / Soh Wooi Yik (second round)
10. (China) He Jiting / Tan Qiang (third round)
11. (Chinese Taipei) Lee Yang / Wang Chi-lin (third round)
12. (Japan) Takuro Hoki / Yugo Kobayashi (final)
13. (Chinese Taipei) Liao Min-chun / Su Ching-heng (quarterfinals)
14. (Malaysia) Goh V Shem / Tan Wee Kiong (third round)
15. (India) Satwiksairaj Rankireddy / Chirag Shetty (withdrew)
16. (China) Liu Cheng / Zhang Nan (quarterfinals)

Click on the seed number of a player to go to their draw section.

== Draw ==
=== Finals ===
Semifinals
7	(Indonesia) Fajar Alfian (Indonesia) Muhammad Rian Ardianto	16	21	10
4	(Indonesia) Mohammad Ahsan (Indonesia) Hendra Setiawan	21	15	21
12	(Japan) Takuro Hoki (Japan) Yugo Kobayashi	21	21
2	(China) Li Junhui (China) Liu Yuchen	19	13

Final
4	(Indonesia) Mohammad Ahsan (Indonesia) Hendra Setiawan	25	9	21
12	(Japan) Takuro Hoki (Japan) Yugo Kobayashi	23	21	15

=== Top half ===
==== Section 1 ====
First Round
(Hong Kong) Chung Y (Hong Kong) Tam C H	11	18
(South Korea) Choi S-g (South Korea) Seo S-j	21	21
(Hong Kong) Chang T C (Hong Kong) Yeung M N	22	13	16
(Chinese Taipei) Lin S-k (Chinese Taipei) Tseng M-h	20	21	21
(Chinese Taipei) Lu C-y (Chinese Taipei) Yang P-h	13	10
(England) M Ellis (England) C Langridge	21	21
(Germany) B Geiss (Germany) J C Völker	12	19
(Malaysia) Ong Y S (Malaysia) Teo E Y	21	21

Second Round
1	(Indonesia) M F Gideon (Indonesia) K S Sukamuljo	21	14	21
(South Korea) Choi S-g (South Korea) Seo S-j	16	21	23
11	(Chinese Taipei) Lee Y (Chinese Taipei) Wang C-l	21	21
(Chinese Taipei) Lin S-k (Chinese Taipei) Tseng M-h	10	14
7	(Indonesia) F Alfian (Indonesia) M R Ardianto	14	21	21
(England) M Ellis (England) C Langridge	21	18	14
14	(Malaysia) Goh V S (Malaysia) Tan W K	21	21
(Malaysia) Ong Y S (Malaysia) Teo E Y	13	18

Third Round
(South Korea) Choi S-g (South Korea) Seo S-j	19	23	21
11	(Chinese Taipei) Lee Y (Chinese Taipei) Wang C-l	21	21	16
7	(Indonesia) F Alfian (Indonesia) M R Ardianto	21	21	21
14	(Malaysia) Goh V S (Malaysia) Tan W K	23	11	11

Quarterfinals
(South Korea) Choi S-g (South Korea) Seo S-j	13	17
7	(Indonesia) F Alfian (Indonesia) M R Ardianto	21	21

==== Section 2 ====
First Round
(Republic of Ireland) J Magee (Republic of Ireland) P Reynolds	12	12
(Netherlands) J Maas (Netherlands) R Tabeling	21	21
(Thailand) B Isara (Thailand) M Jongjit	19	21	19
(Scotland) A Dunn (Scotland) A Hall	21	11	21
(Russia) V Nikulov (Russia) A Serpionov	21	13	21
(Czech Republic) J Janáček (Czech Republic) T Švejda	18	21	18
(Russia) V Durkin (Russia) N Ukk	19	21	21
(Canada) J Hurlburt-Yu (Canada) D Yao	21	15	15

Second Round
4	(Indonesia) M Ahsan (Indonesia) H Setiawan	21	21
(Netherlands) J Maas (Netherlands) R Tabeling	13	12
15	(India) S Rankireddy (India) C Shetty
(Scotland) A Dunn (Scotland) A Hall	w	/	o
8	(Denmark) K Astrup (Denmark) A S Rasmussen	21	21
(Russia) V Nikulov (Russia) A Serpionov	6	15
13	(Chinese Taipei) Liao M-c (Chinese Taipei) Su C-h	21	21
(Russia) V Durkin (Russia) N Ukk	15	11

Third Round
4	(Indonesia) M Ahsan (Indonesia) H Setiawan	21	21
(Scotland) A Dunn (Scotland) A Hall	19	16
8	(Denmark) K Astrup (Denmark) A S Rasmussen	19	21	17
13	(Chinese Taipei) Liao M-c (Chinese Taipei) Su C-h	21	12	21

Quarterfinals
4	(Indonesia) M Ahsan (Indonesia) H Setiawan	21	21
13	(Chinese Taipei) Liao M-c (Chinese Taipei) Su C-h	17	19

=== Bottom half ===
==== Section 3 ====
First Round
(Australia) S Leung (Australia) M Wheller	16	9
(United States) P Chew (United States) R Chew	21	21
(France) T Gicquel (France) R Labar	13	13
(India) M Attri (India) B. S Reddy	21	21
(Indonesia) B Angriawan (Indonesia) Hardianto	20	21	21
(England) B Lane (England) S Vendy	22	13	15
(Russia) V Ivanov (Russia) I Sozonov	21	21
(Malaysia) M Arif A L (Malaysia) N M Azriyn A	12	19

Second Round
(United States) P Chew (United States) R Chew	11	8
12	(Japan) T Hoki (Japan) Y Kobayashi	21	21
(India) M Attri (India) B. S Reddy	16	19
6	(China) Han CK (China) Zhou HD	21	21
(Indonesia) B Angriawan (Indonesia) Hardianto	16	20
10	(China) He JT (China) Tan Q	21	22
(Russia) V Ivanov (Russia) I Sozonov	12	21	14
3	(Japan) T Kamura (Japan) K Sonoda	21	19	21

Third Round
12	(Japan) T Hoki (Japan) Y Kobayashi	21	21
6	(China) Han CK (China) Zhou HD	18	16
10	(China) He JT (China) Tan Q	23	14	12
3	(Japan) T Kamura (Japan) K Sonoda	21	21	21

Quarterfinals
12	(Japan) T Hoki (Japan) Y Kobayashi	21	18	21
3	(Japan) T Kamura (Japan) K Sonoda	16	21	15

==== Section 4 ====
First Round
(India) Arjun M.R. (India) R Shlok	21	21
(Switzerland) T Kuenzi (Switzerland) O Schaller	14	16
(Germany) M Lamsfuß (Germany) M E Seidel	23	11	21
(Singapore) D B Chrisnanta (Singapore) Loh K H	21	21	19
(Japan) T Inoue (Japan) Y Kaneko	21	21
(India) A George (India) S Shukla	18	11
(Austria) P Birker (Austria) D Stipsits	15	15
(Canada) J Ho-shue (Canada) N Yakura	21	21

Second Round
(India) Arjun M.R. (India) R Shlok	14	13
16	(China) Liu C (China) Zhang N	21	21
(Germany) M Lamsfuß (Germany) M E Seidel	21	20	21
5	(Japan) H Endo (Japan) Y Watanabe	17	22	19
(Japan) T Inoue (Japan) Y Kaneko	14	21	21
9	(Malaysia) A Chia (Malaysia) Soh W Y	21	17	18
(Canada) J Ho-shue (Canada) N Yakura	12	15
2	(China) Li JH (China) Liu YC	21	21

Third Round
16	(China) Liu C (China) Zhang N	21	21
(Germany) M Lamsfuß (Germany) M E Seidel	18	17
(Japan) T Inoue (Japan) Y Kaneko	11	21	19
2	(China) Li JH (China) Liu YC	21	19	21

Quarterfinals
16	(China) Liu C (China) Zhang N	13	12
2	(China) Li JH (China) Liu YC	21	21
