= 2021 BWF World Championships – Men's doubles =

Badminton championships

Men's doubles at the 2021 BWF World Championships
- Venue: Palacio de los Deportes Carolina Marín
- Location: Huelva, Spain
- Dates: 12–19 December

Medalists
gold medal	Takuro Hoki; Yugo Kobayashi	Japan
silver medal	He Jiting; Tan Qiang	China
bronze medal	Ong Yew Sin; Teo Ee Yi	Malaysia
bronze medal	Kim Astrup; Anders Skaarup Rasmussen	Denmark

The men's doubles tournament of the 2021 BWF World Championships took place from 12 to 19 December 2021 at the Palacio de los Deportes Carolina Marín at Huelva.

== Seeds ==
The seeding list is based on the World Rankings of 23 November 2021.

1. (Indonesia) Marcus Fernaldi Gideon / Kevin Sanjaya Sukamuljo (withdrew)
2. (Indonesia) Hendra Setiawan / Mohammad Ahsan (withdrew)
3. (Chinese Taipei) Lee Yang / Wang Chi-lin (quarter-finals)
4. (Malaysia) Aaron Chia / Soh Wooi Yik (third round)
5. (Japan) Takuro Hoki / Yugo Kobayashi (champions)
6. (Indonesia) Fajar Alfian / Muhammad Rian Ardianto (withdrew)
7. (Denmark) Kim Astrup / Anders Skaarup Rasmussen (semi-finals)
8. (India) Satwiksairaj Rankireddy / Chirag Shetty (third round)
9. (Malaysia) Ong Yew Sin / Teo Ee Yi (semi-finals)
10. (Malaysia) Goh V Shem / Tan Wee Kiong (quarter-finals)
11. (Russia) Vladimir Ivanov / Ivan Sozonov (third round)
12. (Germany) Mark Lamsfuß / Marvin Seidel (quarter-finals)
13. (England) Ben Lane / Sean Vendy (second round)
14. (Malaysia) Goh Sze Fei / Nur Izzuddin (third round)
15. (Chinese Taipei) Lu Ching-yao / Yang Po-han (withdrew)
16. (China) He Jiting / Tan Qiang (final)

== Draw ==
=== Finals ===
Semi-finals
5	(Japan) Takuro Hoki (Japan) Yugo Kobayashi	21	21
9	(Malaysia) Ong Yew Sin (Malaysia) Teo Ee Yi	13	9
16	(China) He Jiting (China) Tan Qiang	21	13	21
7	(Denmark) Kim Astrup (Denmark) Anders Skaarup Rasmussen	16	21	15

Final
5	(Japan) Takuro Hoki (Japan) Yugo Kobayashi	21	21
16	(China) He Jiting (China) Tan Qiang	12	18

=== Top half ===
==== Section 1 ====
First Round
(Italy) G Greco (Italy) K Strobl	12	12
(Japan) K Matsui (Japan) Y Takeuchi	21	21
(France) F Delrue (France) W Villeger	21	21
(Republic of Ireland) J Magee (Republic of Ireland) P Reynolds	13	11
(Hong Kong) Chang T C (Hong Kong) Yeung M N	13	17
(China) Huang KX (China) Liu C	21	21
(Czech Republic) J Janáček (Czech Republic) T Švejda	18	14
(Scotland) C Grimley (Scotland) M Grimley	21	21

Second Round
1	(Indonesia) M F Gideon (Indonesia) K S Sukamuljo
(Japan) K Matsui (Japan) Y Takeuchi	w	/	o
13	(England) B Lane (England) S Vendy	19	21	15
(France) F Delrue (France) W Villeger	21	12	21
5	(Japan) T Hoki (Japan) Y Kobayashi	21	18	21
(China) Huang KX (China) Liu C	12	21	13
15	(Chinese Taipei) Lu C-y (Chinese Taipei) Yang P-ha
(Scotland) C Grimley (Scotland) M Grimley	w	/	o

Third Round
(Japan) K Matsui (Japan) Y Takeuchi	24	25
(France) F Delrue (France) W Villeger	22	23
5	(Japan) T Hoki (Japan) Y Kobayashi	21	21
(Scotland) C Grimley (Scotland) M Grimley	14	15

Quarter-finals
(Japan) K Matsui (Japan) Y Takeuchi	18	12
5	(Japan) T Hoki (Japan) Y Kobayashi	21	21

==== Section 2 ====
First Round
(Algeria) K Mammeri (Algeria) Y S Medel	11	9
(Netherlands) R Jille (Netherlands) T van der Lecq	21	21
(Indonesia) L R Carnando (Indonesia) D Marthin
(Scotland) A Dunn (Scotland) A Hall	w	/	o
(Brazil) Fa Farias (Brazil) Fr Farias	4	12
(Chinese Taipei) Lee J-h (Chinese Taipei) Yang P-hs	21	21
(India) M Attri (India) B. S Reddy	16	15
(Denmark) J Eipe (Denmark) R Kjær	21	21

Second Round
3	(Chinese Taipei) Lee Y (Chinese Taipei) Wang C-l	18	21	21
(Netherlands) R Jille (Netherlands) T van der Lecq	21	7	11
14	(Malaysia) Goh S F (Malaysia) N Izzuddin	21	19	21
(Scotland) A Dunn (Scotland) A Hall	14	21	16
8	(India) S Rankireddy (India) C Shetty	27	21
(Chinese Taipei) Lee J-h (Chinese Taipei) Yang P-hs	25	17
9	(Malaysia) Ong Y S (Malaysia) Teo E Y	21	21
(Denmark) J Eipe (Denmark) R Kjær	12	19

Third Round
3	(Chinese Taipei) Lee Y (Chinese Taipei) Wang C-l	21	17	21
14	(Malaysia) Goh S F (Malaysia) N Izzuddin	18	21	18
8	(India) S Rankireddy (India) C Shetty	20	21	15
9	(Malaysia) Ong Y S (Malaysia) Teo E Y	22	18	21

Quarter-finals
3	(Chinese Taipei) Lee Y (Chinese Taipei) Wang C-l	21	17	15
9	(Malaysia) Ong Y S (Malaysia) Teo E Y	12	21	21

=== Bottom half ===
==== Section 3 ====
First Round
(Japan) H Okamura (Japan) M Onodera	21	21
(Ukraine) G Beketov (Ukraine) M Makhnovskiy	10	9
(Germany) B Geiss (Germany) J C Völker	w	/	o
(Guatemala) J Solís (Guatemala) A Marroquín
(England) C Hemming (England) S Stallwood	21	21
(Nigeria) G Olofua (Nigeria) A J Opeyori	9	11
(China) Ou XY (China) Zhang N	21	21
(India) A George (India) S Shukla	15	14

Second Round
(Japan) H Okamura (Japan) M Onodera	15	24	16
10	(Malaysia) Goh V S (Malaysia) Tan W K	21	22	21
(Germany) B Geiss (Germany) J C Völker	w	/	o
6	(Indonesia) F Alfian (Indonesia) M R Ardianto
(England) C Hemming (England) S Stallwood	21	12	12
16	(China) He JT (China) Tan Q	16	21	21
(China) Ou XY (China) Zhang N	18	22	16
4	(Malaysia) A Chia (Malaysia) Soh W Y	21	20	21

Third Round
10	(Malaysia) Goh V S (Malaysia) Tan W K	21	14	21
(Germany) B Geiss (Germany) J C Völker	14	21	17
16	(China) He JT (China) Tan Q	17	21	21
4	(Malaysia) A Chia (Malaysia) Soh W Y	21	14	16

Quarter-finals
10	(Malaysia) Goh V S (Malaysia) Tan W K	20	14
16	(China) He JT (China) Tan Q	22	21

==== Section 4 ====
First Round
(India) Arjun M.R. (India) D Kapila	21	21
(Denmark) D Lundgaard (Denmark) M Thyrri	18	17
(China) Di ZJ (China) Wang C	9	13
(Japan) A Koga (Japan) T Saito	21	21
(France) C Popov (France) T J Popov
(Spain) J Monroy (Spain) C Piris	w	/	o
(Norway) T Flaatten (Norway) V Rikheim	21	21
(Austria) P Birker (Austria) D Stipsits	15	17

Second Round
(India) Arjun M.R. (India) D Kapila	11	16
11	(Russia) V Ivanov (Russia) I Sozonov	21	21
(Japan) A Koga (Japan) T Saito	17	19
7	(Denmark) K Astrup (Denmark) A S Rasmussen	21	21
(Spain) J Monroy (Spain) C Piris	13	15
12	(Germany) M Lamsfuß (Germany) M Seidel	21	21
(Norway) T Flaatten (Norway) V Rikheim	w	/	o
2	(Indonesia) M Ahsan (Indonesia) H Setiawan

Third Round
11	(Russia) V Ivanov (Russia) I Sozonov	22	14	11
7	(Denmark) K Astrup (Denmark) A S Rasmussen	20	21	21
12	(Germany) M Lamsfuß (Germany) M Seidel	21	21
(Norway) T Flaatten (Norway) V Rikheim	6	18

Quarter-finals
7	(Denmark) K Astrup (Denmark) A S Rasmussen	26	21	21
12	(Germany) M Lamsfuß (Germany) M Seidel	28	13	9
