= Anders Skaarup Rasmussen =

Danish badminton player (born 1989)

Personal information
- Born: 15 February 1989 (age 37) Odder, Denmark
- Height: 1.89 m (6 ft 2 in)

Sport
- Country: Denmark
- Sport: Badminton
- Handedness: Right

Men's & mixed doubles
- Highest ranking: 1 (MD with Kim Astrup, 17 December 2024); 29 (XD with Lena Grebak, 16 January 2014)
- Current ranking: 24 (MD with Kim Astrup, 3 November 2026)
- BWF profile
Medal record
Men's badminton
Representing Denmark
World Championships
Silver medal – second place	2023 Copenhagen	Men's doubles
Bronze medal – third place	2021 Huelva	Men's doubles
Bronze medal – third place	2025 Paris	Men's doubles
Thomas Cup
Gold medal – first place	2016 Kunshan	Men's team
Bronze medal – third place	2018 Bangkok	Men's team
Bronze medal – third place	2020 Aarhus	Men's team
Bronze medal – third place	2022 Bangkok	Men's team
Bronze medal – third place	2026 Horsens	Men's team
European Games
Gold medal – first place	2023 Kraków–Małopolska	Men's doubles
Silver medal – second place	2019 Minsk	Men's doubles
European Championships
Gold medal – first place	2018 Huelva	Men's doubles
Gold medal – first place	2024 Saarbrücken	Men's doubles
Silver medal – second place	2016 La Roche-sur-Yon	Men's doubles
Bronze medal – third place	2017 Kolding	Men's doubles
Bronze medal – third place	2021 Kyiv	Men's doubles
European Mixed Team Championships
Gold medal – first place	2015 Leuven	Mixed team
Gold medal – first place	2019 Copenhagen	Mixed team
Gold medal – first place	2021 Vantaa	Mixed team
Gold medal – first place	2025 Baku	Mixed team
European Men's Team Championships
Gold medal – first place	2014 Basel	Men's team
Gold medal – first place	2016 Kazan	Men's team
Gold medal – first place	2020 Liévin	Men's team
Gold medal – first place	2024 Łódź	Men's team
Silver medal – second place	2026 Istanbul	Men's team

Anders Skaarup Rasmussen (born 15 February 1989) is a Danish badminton player. Rasmussen won the men's doubles title at the 2018 European Championships and at the 2023 European Games partnered with Kim Astrup. He also won the bronze medal at the World Championships in 2021 and later a silver medal in 2023. Together with Astrup, he reached a career high of World number 1 in the men's doubles in December 2024.

Rasmussen joined the Denmark winning team at the European mixed team championships in 2015, 2019 and 2021; European men's team championships in 2014, 2016 and 2020; and the grade 1 badminton tournament World men's team championships, the Thomas Cup in 2016.

== Career ==
In 2018, Rasmussen emerge victorious in the men's doubles at the European Championships. In the final, Rasmussen and Kim Astrup received an easy win to their compatriot Mads Conrad-Petersen and Mads Pieler Kolding, after Kolding had to withdraw due to abdominal injury before going into the second game. In September, Rasmussen and Astrup claimed their first ever BWF World Tour Super 1000 title in the China Open after beating host pair Han Chengkai and Zhou Haodong in the final. Their victory at that tournament, led them up to 5th place in the BWF ranking.

Rasmussen made his debut at the European Games in 2019, where he won the silver medal with and his partner, Astrup.

At the 2021 World Championships, Rasmussen and Astrup won the bronze medal. The duo were defeated in the semi-finals by the Chinese pair He Jiting and Tan Qiang.

Rasmussen competed for Denmark at the 2020 Summer Olympics in men's doubles, partnering Kim Astrup. The duo were eliminated in the quarter-finals to Li Junhui and Liu Yuchen.

In 2023, Rasmussen managed to win the gold medal in his second appearance at the European Games with his partner Astrup. As the top seed, they beat the second seeded pair from Great Britain Ben Lane and Sean Vendy in a tight match. At the BWF World Championships, he and his partner then upgraded the bronze to silver that they won in 2021, after battling the final match in Royal Arena against the rising Korean pair Kang Min-hyuk and Seo Seung-jae which ended in defeat in a close rubber game.

Rasmussen and Astrup also competed for Denmark at the 2024 Summer Olympics, finishing fourth in the men's doubles event.

== Achievements ==
=== World Championships ===
Men's doubles
Year	Venue	Partner	Opponent	Score	Result
2021	Palacio de los Deportes Carolina Marín; Huelva, Spain	(Denmark) Kim Astrup	(China) He Jiting (China) Tan Qiang	16–21, 21–13, 15–21	Bronze
2023	Royal Arena; Copenhagen, Denmark	(Denmark) Kim Astrup	(South Korea) Kang Min-hyuk (South Korea) Seo Seung-jae	21–14, 15–21, 17–21	Silver
2025	Adidas Arena; Paris, France	(Denmark) Kim Astrup	(South Korea) Kim Won-ho (South Korea) Seo Seung-jae	12–21, 3–21	Bronze

=== European Games ===
Men's doubles
Year	Venue	Partner	Opponent	Score	Result
2019	Falcon Club; Minsk, Belarus	(Denmark) Kim Astrup	(United Kingdom) Marcus Ellis (United Kingdom) Chris Langridge	17–21, 10–21	Silver
2023	Arena Jaskółka; Tarnów, Poland	(Denmark) Kim Astrup	(United Kingdom) Ben Lane (United Kingdom) Sean Vendy	21–15, 19–21, 21–19	Gold

=== European Championships ===
Men's doubles
Year	Venue	Partner	Opponent	Score	Result
2016	Vendéspace; La Roche-sur-Yon, France	(Denmark) Kim Astrup	(Denmark) Mads Conrad-Petersen (Denmark) Mads Pieler Kolding	21–14, 18–21, 13–21	Silver
2017	Sydbank Arena; Kolding, Denmark	(Denmark) Kim Astrup	(Denmark) Mads Conrad-Petersen (Denmark) Mads Pieler Kolding	17–21, 22–24	Bronze
2018	Palacio de los Deportes Carolina Marín; Huelva, Spain	(Denmark) Kim Astrup	(Denmark) Mads Conrad-Petersen (Denmark) Mads Pieler Kolding	21–15, retired	Gold
2021	Palace of Sports; Kyiv, Ukraine	(Denmark) Kim Astrup	(Germany) Mark Lamsfuß (Germany) Marvin Seidel	21–23, 17–21	Bronze
2024	Saarlandhalle; Saarbrücken, Germany	(Denmark) Kim Astrup	(Denmark) Andreas Søndergaard (Denmark) Jesper Toft	21–16, 21–15	Gold

=== BWF World Tour (10 titles, 6 runners-up) ===
The BWF World Tour, which was announced on 19 March 2017 and implemented in 2018, is a series of elite badminton tournaments sanctioned by the Badminton World Federation (BWF). The BWF World Tour is divided into levels of World Tour Finals, Super 1000, Super 750, Super 500, Super 300, and the BWF Tour Super 100.

Men's doubles
Year	Tournament	Level	Partner	Opponent	Score	Result
2018	India Open	Super 500	(Denmark) Kim Astrup	(Indonesia) Marcus Fernaldi Gideon (Indonesia) Kevin Sanjaya Sukamuljo	14–21, 16–21	(silver) Runner-up
2018	China Open	Super 1000	(Denmark) Kim Astrup	(China) Han Chengkai (China) Zhou Haodong	21–13, 17–21, 21–14	(gold) Winner
2020	Spain Masters	Super 300	(Denmark) Kim Astrup	(Chinese Taipei) Lee Yang (Chinese Taipei) Wang Chi-lin	21–17, 21–19	(gold) Winner
2021	Swiss Open	Super 300	(Denmark) Kim Astrup	(Germany) Mark Lamsfuß (Germany) Marvin Seidel	21–16, 21–11	(gold) Winner
2021	Denmark Open	Super 1000	(Denmark) Kim Astrup	(Japan) Takuro Hoki (Japan) Yugo Kobayashi	18–21, 12–21	(silver) Runner-up
2022	Japan Open	Super 750	(Denmark) Kim Astrup	(China) Liang Weikeng (China) Wang Chang	18–21, 21–13, 17–21	(silver) Runner-up
2023	Canada Open	Super 500	(Denmark) Kim Astrup	(Denmark) Rasmus Kjær (Denmark) Frederik Søgaard	23–25, 21–16, 21–12	(gold) Winner
2023	Hong Kong Open	Super 500	(Denmark) Kim Astrup	(Indonesia) Leo Rolly Carnando (Indonesia) Daniel Marthin	21–10, 22–24, 21–19	(gold) Winner
2023	Arctic Open	Super 500	(Denmark) Kim Astrup	(Malaysia) Man Wei Chong (Malaysia) Tee Kai Wun	21–18, 21–17	(gold) Winner
2023	French Open	Super 750	(Denmark) Kim Astrup	(Indonesia) Muhammad Shohibul Fikri (Indonesia) Bagas Maulana	21–14, 10–21, 21–18	(gold) Winner
2024	Indonesia Masters	Super 500	(Denmark) Kim Astrup	(Indonesia) Leo Rolly Carnando (Indonesia) Daniel Marthin	12–21, 22–20, 11–21	(silver) Runner-up
2024	Malaysia Masters	Super 500	(Denmark) Kim Astrup	(South Korea) Jin Yong (South Korea) Na Sung-seung	21–18, 21–14	(gold) Winner
2024	Canada Open	Super 500	(Denmark) Kim Astrup	(England) Ben Lane (England) Sean Vendy	18–21, 21–14, 21–11	(gold) Winner
2024	Arctic Open	Super 500	(Denmark) Kim Astrup	(Malaysia) Goh Sze Fei (Malaysia) Nur Izzuddin	21–15, 15–21, 19–21	(silver) Runner-up
2024	Denmark Open	Super 750	(Denmark) Kim Astrup	(China) Liang Weikeng (China) Wang Chang	18–21, 17–21	(silver) Runner-up
2024	BWF World Tour Finals	World Tour Finals	(Denmark) Kim Astrup	(Malaysia) Goh Sze Fei (Malaysia) Nur Izzuddin	21–17, 17–21, 21–11	(gold) Winner

=== BWF Grand Prix (3 titles, 4 runners-up) ===
The BWF Grand Prix had two levels, the Grand Prix and Grand Prix Gold. It was a series of badminton tournaments sanctioned by the Badminton World Federation (BWF) and played between 2007 and 2017.

Men's doubles
Year	Tournament	Partner	Opponent	Score	Result
2013	Bitburger Open	(Denmark) Kim Astrup	(Denmark) Mads Conrad-Petersen (Denmark) Mads Pieler Kolding	11–21, 16–21	(silver) Runner-up
2013	Scottish Open	(Denmark) Kim Astrup	(Denmark) Mads Conrad-Petersen (Denmark) Mads Pieler Kolding	Walkover	(silver) Runner-up
2014	Bitburger Open	(Denmark) Kim Astrup	(China) Wang Yilyu (China) Zhang Wen	14–21, 10–21	(silver) Runner-up
2016	Swiss Open	(Denmark) Kim Astrup	(Chinese Taipei) Lee Sheng-mu (Chinese Taipei) Tsai Chia-hsin	21–8, 21–15	(gold) Winner
2017	German Open	(Denmark) Kim Astrup	(Denmark) Mads Conrad-Petersen (Denmark) Mads Pieler Kolding	21–17, 21–13	(gold) Winner
2017	Bitburger Open	(Denmark) Kim Astrup	(Indonesia) Fajar Alfian (Indonesia) Muhammad Rian Ardianto	21–19, 19–21, 21–18	(gold) Winner

Mixed doubles
Year	Tournament	Partner	Opponent	Score	Result
2017	Bitburger Open	(Denmark) Line Kjærsfeldt	(China) He Jiting (China) Du Yue	18–21, 17–21	(silver) Runner-up

BWF Grand Prix Gold tournament
BWF Grand Prix tournament

=== BWF International Challenge/Series (13 titles, 6 runners-up) ===
Men's doubles
Year	Tournament	Partner	Opponent	Score	Result
2009	Iceland International	(Denmark) René Lindskow	(Denmark) Christopher Bruun Jensen (Denmark) Thomas Fynbo	21–16, 21–16	(gold) Winner
2010	Portugal International	(Denmark) Martin Kragh	(Croatia) Zvonimir Đurkinjak (Croatia) Zvonimir Hölbling	21–18, 21–14	(gold) Winner
2011	Portugal International	(Denmark) Mats Bue	(Denmark) Niclas Nøhr (Denmark) Mads Pedersen	26–28, 21–16, 17–21	(silver) Runner-up
2013	Portugal International	(Denmark) Kim Astrup	(England) Peter Briggs (England) Harley Towler	21–18, 21–14	(gold) Winner
2013	Denmark International	(Denmark) Kim Astrup	(England) Marcus Ellis (Scotland) Paul van Rietvelde	23–25, 21–16, 19–21	(silver) Runner-up
2013	Kharkiv International	(Denmark) Kim Astrup	(Poland) Adam Cwalina (Poland) Przemysław Wacha	20–22, 21–15, 12–21	(silver) Runner-up
2013	Belgian International	(Denmark) Kim Astrup	(England) Chris Langridge (England) Peter Mills	28–26, 21–18	(gold) Winner
2014	Finnish Open	(Denmark) Kim Astrup	(Chinese Taipei) Huang Po-jui (Chinese Taipei) Lu Ching-yao	21–18, 21–17	(gold) Winner
2015	Swedish Masters	(Denmark) Kim Astrup	(Poland) Adam Cwalina (Poland) Przemysław Wacha	21–15, 21–11	(gold) Winner
2016	Swedish Masters	(Denmark) Kim Astrup	(Denmark) Mathias Christiansen (Denmark) David Daugaard	19–21, 23–21, 19–21	(silver) Runner-up

Mixed doubles
Year	Tournament	Partner	Opponent	Score	Result
2010	Dutch International	(Denmark) Anne Skelbæk	(Denmark) Christian John Skovgaard (Denmark) Julie Houmann	21–17, 21–12	(gold) Winner
2010	Czech International	(Denmark) Anne Skelbæk	(Netherlands) Jelle Maas (Netherlands) Iris Tabeling	21–16, 21–11	(gold) Winner
2012	Finnish Open	(Denmark) Sara Thygesen	(England) Chris Adcock (Scotland) Imogen Bankier	24–22, 12–21, 13–21	(silver) Runner-up
2013	Finnish Open	(Denmark) Lena Grebak	(Ukraine) Valeriy Atrashchenkov (Ukraine) Anna Kobceva	13–21, 21–15, 21–11	(gold) Winner
2013	Portugal International	(Denmark) Lena Grebak	(Germany) Jones Ralfy Jansen (Indonesia) Keshya Nurvita Hanadia	16–21, 21–18, 16–21	(silver) Runner-up
2013	Denmark International	(Denmark) Lena Grebak	(Denmark) Kim Astrup (Denmark) Maria Helsbøl	21–16, 21–8	(gold) Winner
2013	Spanish Open	(Denmark) Lena Grebak	(Poland) Wojciech Szkudlarczyk (Poland) Agnieszka Wojtkowska	21–14, 21–18	(gold) Winner
2013	Belgian International	(Denmark) Lena Grebak	(Netherlands) Jacco Arends (Netherlands) Selena Piek	21–18, 9–21, 21–15	(gold) Winner
2014	Finnish Open	(Denmark) Lena Grebak	(Sweden) Nico Ruponen (Sweden) Amanda Högström	22–24, 21–19, 21–13	(gold) Winner

BWF International Challenge tournament
BWF International Series tournament

== Record against selected opponents ==
Men's doubles results with Kim Astrup against Year-end Finals finalists, World Championships semi-finalists, and Olympic quarter-finalists. Accurate as of 13 August 2024.

Players	M	W	L	Diff.
(China) Chai Biao & Hong Wei	5	0	5	–1
(China) Fu Haifeng & Zhang Nan	2	1	1	0
(China) He Jiting & Tan Qiang	4	2	2	0
(China) Li Junhui & Liu Yuchen	9	1	8	–7
(China) Liang Weikeng & Wang Chang	4	1	3	–2
(China) Liu Cheng & Zhang Nan	2	0	2	–2
(China) Liu Xiaolong & Qiu Zihan	1	1	0	+1
(China) Liu Yuchen & Ou Xuanyi	7	3	4	–1
(Chinese Taipei) Chen Hung-ling & Wang Chi-lin	6	4	2	+2
(Chinese Taipei) Lee Yang & Wang Chi-lin	10	3	7	–4
(Denmark) Mathias Boe & Carsten Mogensen	1	0	1	–1
(England) Marcus Ellis & Chris Langridge	3	1	2	–1
(India) Satwiksairaj Rankireddy & Chirag Shetty	10	6	4	+2
(Indonesia) Mohammad Ahsan & Rian Agung Saputro	2	0	2	–2
(Indonesia) Mohammad Ahsan & Hendra Setiawan	10	3	7	–4
(Indonesia) Fajar Alfian & Muhammad Rian Ardianto	7	4	3	+1

Players	M	W	L	Diff.
(Indonesia) Marcus Fernaldi Gideon & Kevin Sanjaya Sukamuljo	10	1	9	–8
(Japan) Hiroyuki Endo & Kenichi Hayakawa	2	0	2	–2
(Japan) Hiroyuki Endo & Yuta Watanabe	5	2	3	–1
(Japan) Takuro Hoki & Yugo Kobayashi	13	6	7	–1
(Japan) Takeshi Kamura & Keigo Sonoda	10	4	6	–2
(Malaysia) Aaron Chia & Soh Wooi Yik	12	4	8	–4
(Malaysia) Goh V Shem & Tan Wee Kiong	5	2	3	–1
(Malaysia) Ong Yew Sin & Teo Ee Yi	4	2	2	0
(Russia) Vladimir Ivanov & Ivan Sozonov	10	8	2	+6
(South Korea) Kang Min-hyuk & Seo Seung-jae	3	2	1	+1
(South Korea) Kim Gi-jung & Kim Sa-rang	4	2	2	0
(South Korea) Ko Sung-hyun & Shin Baek-cheol	2	0	2	–2
(South Korea) Lee Yong-dae & Yoo Yeon-seong	5	0	5	–5
(Thailand) Bodin Isara & Maneepong Jongjit	1	0	1	–1
(Thailand) Supak Jomkoh & Kittinupong Kedren	4	3	1	+2
