= Kang Min-hyuk (badminton) =

South Korean badminton player (born 1999)

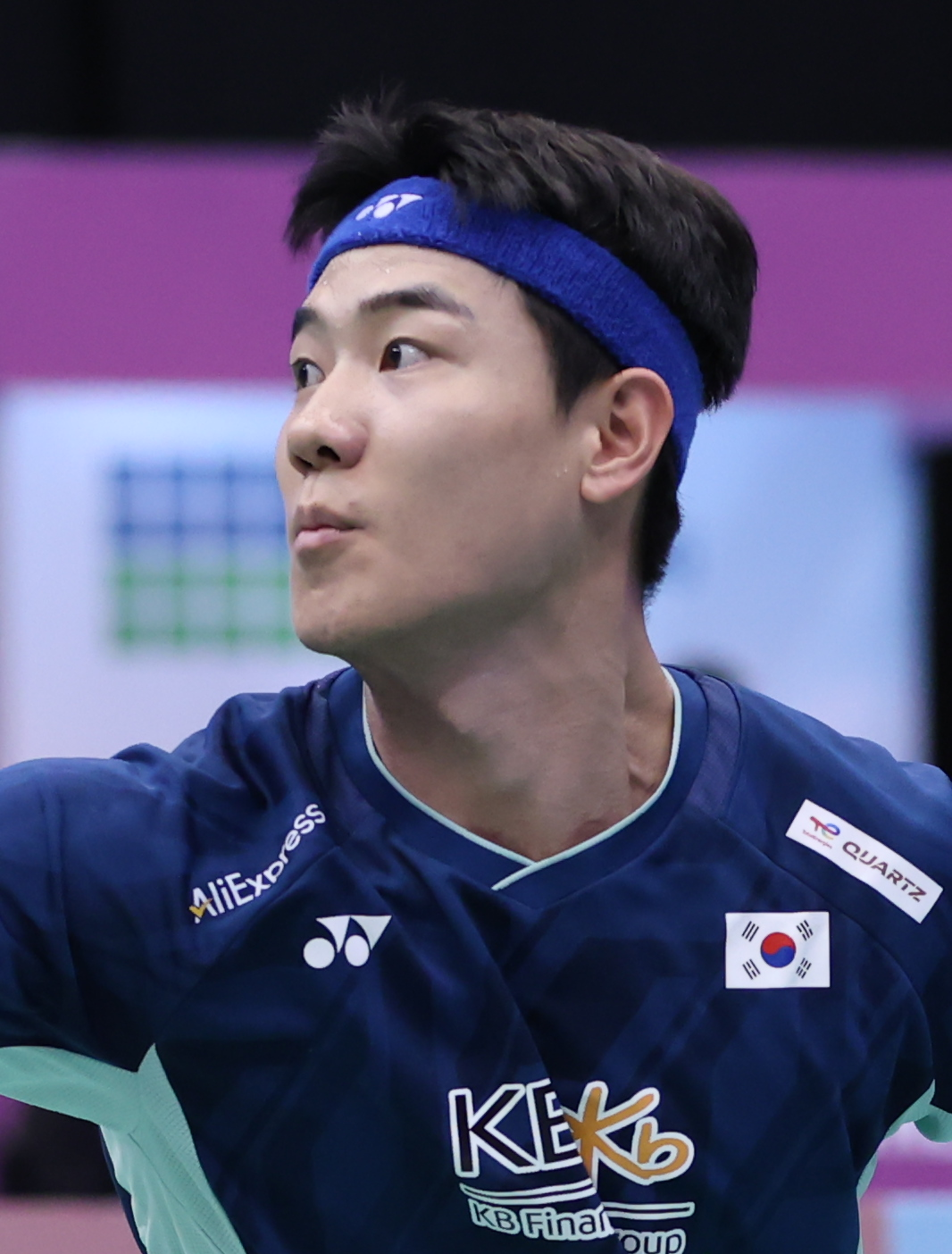
- Kang at the 2025 Taipei Open

Personal information
- Born: 17 February 1999 (age 27) Uijeongbu, Gyeonggi, South Korea
- Height: 1.83 m (6 ft 0 in)

Sport
- Country: South Korea
- Sport: Badminton
- Handedness: Right

Men's doubles
- Highest ranking: 2 (with Seo Seung-jae, 20 February 2024)
- Current ranking: 11 (with Ki Dong-ju, 10 November 2026)
- BWF profile
Medal record
Men 's badminton
Representing South Korea
World Championships
Gold medal – first place	2023 Copenhagen	Men's doubles
Sudirman Cup
Silver medal – second place	2023 Suzhou	Mixed team
Silver medal – second place	2025 Xiamen	Mixed team
Bronze medal – third place	2021 Vantaa	Mixed team
Asian Games
Bronze medal – third place	2022 Hangzhou	Men's team
Asian Championships
Silver medal – second place	2026 Ningbo	Men's doubles
Bronze medal – third place	2019 Wuhan	Men's doubles
Asia Team Championships
Bronze medal – third place	2018 Alor Setar	Men's team
Bronze medal – third place	2024 Selangor	Men's team
Bronze medal – third place	2026 Qingdao	Men's team
World Junior Championships
Bronze medal – third place	2017 Yogyakarta	Boys' doubles
Bronze medal – third place	2017 Yogyakarta	Mixed team
Asian Junior Championships
Gold medal – first place	2017 Jakarta	Mixed team
Silver medal – second place	2016 Bangkok	Mixed team
Bronze medal – third place	2017 Jakarta	Mixed doubles

Korean name
- Hangul: 강민혁
- RR: Gang Minhyeok
- MR: Kang Minhyŏk

Kang Min-hyuk (Korean: 강민혁; born 17 February 1999) is a South Korean badminton player affiliated with Samsung Electro-Mechanics team. He became men's doubles World champion with his partner Seo Seung-jae in 2023. Educated at Maewon High School, Kang rose to prominence when he along with Kim Won-ho, defeated seeded players at the 2019 Asian Championships and reached the semi-finals, ultimately winning the bronze medal. He has joined the South Korea national badminton team since 2017, became the part of Korean team that won bronze medal at the 2021 Sudirman Cup and the silver medal in 2023. During his career as a junior player, Kang became the part of 2017 Asian Junior Championships mixed team champion as well.

== Achievements ==
=== World Championships ===
Men's doubles
Year	Venue	Partner	Opponent	Score	Result
2023	Royal Arena; Copenhagen, Denmark	(South Korea) Seo Seung-jae	(Denmark) Kim Astrup (Denmark) Anders Skaarup Rasmussen	14–21, 21–15, 21–17	Gold

=== Asian Championships ===
Men's doubles
Year	Venue	Partner	Opponent	Score	Result
2019	Wuhan Sports Center Gymnasium, Wuhan, China	(South Korea) Kim Won-ho	(Japan) Hiroyuki Endo (Japan) Yuta Watanabe	17–21, 22–20, 25–27	Bronze
2026	Ningbo Olympic Sports Center Gymnasium, Ningbo, China	(South Korea) Ki Dong-ju	(South Korea) Kim Won-ho (South Korea) Seo Seung-jae	13–21, 17–21	Silver

=== World Junior Championships ===
Boys' doubles
Year	Venue	Partner	Opponent	Score	Result
2017	GOR Among Rogo; Yogyakarta, Indonesia	(South Korea) Kim Won-ho	(Japan) Mahiro Kaneko (Japan) Yunosuke Kubota	21–19, 17–21, 19–21	Bronze

=== Asian Junior Championships ===
Mixed doubles
Year	Venue	Partner	Opponent	Score	Result
2017	Jaya Raya Sports Hall Training Center; Jakarta, Indonesia	(South Korea) Baek Ha-na	(South Korea) Na Sung-seung (South Korea) Seong Ah-yeong	20–22, 21–18, 19–21	Bronze

=== BWF World Tour (7 titles, 5 runners-up) ===
The BWF World Tour, which was announced on 19 March 2017 and implemented in 2018, is a series of elite badminton tournaments sanctioned by the Badminton World Federation (BWF). The BWF World Tour is divided into levels of World Tour Finals, Super 1000, Super 750, Super 500, Super 300, and the BWF Tour Super 100.

Men's doubles
Year	Tournament	Level	Partner	Opponent	Score	Result
2018	U.S. Open	Super 300	(South Korea) Kim Won-ho	(China) Ou Xuanyi (China) Ren Xiangyu	21–16, 16–21, 17–21	(silver) Runner-up
2022	Korea Open	Super 500	(South Korea) Seo Seung-jae	(Indonesia) Fajar Alfian (Indonesia) Muhammad Rian Ardianto	19–21, 21–15, 21–18	(gold) Winner
2023	German Open	Super 300	(South Korea) Seo Seung-jae	(South Korea) Choi Sol-gyu (South Korea) Kim Won-ho	19–21, 21–18, 19–21	(silver) Runner-up
2023	Malaysia Masters	Super 500	(South Korea) Seo Seung-jae	(Malaysia) Man Wei Chong (Malaysia) Tee Kai Wun	21–15, 22–24, 21–19	(gold) Winner
2023	Australian Open	Super 500	(South Korea) Seo Seung-jae	(Japan) Takuro Hoki (Japan) Yugo Kobayashi	21–17, 21–17	(gold) Winner
2023	BWF World Tour Finals	World Tour Finals	(South Korea) Seo Seung-jae	(China) Liang Weikeng (China) Wang Chang	21–17, 22–20	(gold) Winner
2024	India Open	Super 750	(South Korea) Seo Seung-jae	(India) Satwiksairaj Rankireddy (India) Chirag Shetty	15–21, 21–11, 21–18	(gold) Winner
2024	Japan Open	Super 750	(South Korea) Seo Seung-jae	(Malaysia) Goh Sze Fei (Malaysia) Nur Izzuddin	19–21, 15–21	(silver) Runner-up
2024	Korea Open	Super 500	(South Korea) Seo Seung-jae	(Indonesia) Leo Rolly Carnando (Indonesia) Bagas Maulana	21–18, 9–21, 8–21	(silver) Runner-up
2024	Hong Kong Open	Super 500	(South Korea) Seo Seung-jae	(Indonesia) Sabar Karyaman Gutama (Indonesia) Muhammad Reza Pahlevi Isfahani	21–13, 21–17	(gold) Winner
2025	Orléans Masters	Super 300	(South Korea) Ki Dong-ju	(China) Liang Weikeng (China) Wang Chang	21–13, 18–21, 21–18	(gold) Winner
2025	Taipei Open	Super 300	(South Korea) Ki Dong-ju	(Chinese Taipei) Chiu Hsiang-chieh (Chinese Taipei) Wang Chi-lin	18–21, 15–21	(silver) Runner-up

=== BWF International Challenge/Series (1 title, 3 runners-up) ===
Men's doubles
Year	Tournament	Partner	Opponent	Score	Result
2019	Osaka International	(South Korea) Kim Jae-hwan	(South Korea) Ko Sung-hyun (South Korea) Shin Baek-cheol	13–21, 16–21	(silver) Runner-up
2019	Vietnam International	(South Korea) Kim Jae-hwan	(Indonesia) Kenas Adi Haryanto (Indonesia) Rian Agung Saputro	19–21, 21–15, 18–21	(silver) Runner-up
2019	Mongolia International	(South Korea) Kim Jae-hwan	(South Korea) Kim Won-ho (South Korea) Park Kyung-hoon	21–14, 27–29, 14–21	(silver) Runner-up
2019	Indonesia International	(South Korea) Kim Jae-hwan	(Indonesia) Muhammad Fachrikar (Indonesia) Amri Syahnawi	21–17, 11–21, 21–15	(gold) Winner

BWF International Challenge tournament
BWF International Series tournament

=== BWF Junior International (3 titles, 1 runner-up) ===
Boys' doubles
Year	Tournament	Partner	Opponent	Score	Result
2016	Korean Junior International	(South Korea) Kim Won-ho	(Chinese Taipei) Su Li-wei (Chinese Taipei) Ye Hong-wei	11–3, 9–11, 7–11, 8–11	(silver) Runner-up
2017	Banthongyord Junior International	(South Korea) Kim Won-ho	(South Korea) Kim Moon-jun (South Korea) Wang Chan	21–12, 21–14	(gold) Winner
2017	Jaya Raya Junior International	(South Korea) Kim Won-ho	(South Korea) Lee Sang-min (South Korea) Na Sung-seung	21–13, 21–13	(gold) Winner

Mixed doubles
Year	Tournament	Partner	Opponent	Score	Result
2016	Korean Junior International	(South Korea) Sim Yu-jin	(South Korea) Wu Seung-hoon (South Korea) Kim Min-ji	12–10, 11–7, 10–12, 11–6	(gold) Winner

BWF Junior International Grand Prix tournament
BWF Junior International Challenge tournament
BWF Junior International Series tournament
BWF Junior Future Series tournament
