= Satwiksairaj Rankireddy =

Indian badminton player (born 2000)

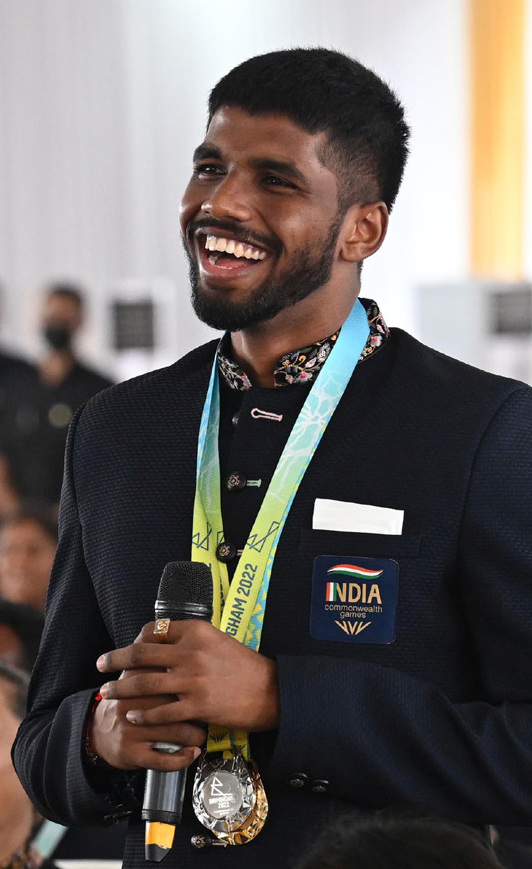
- Rankireddy in 2022

Personal information
- Born: 13 August 2000 (age 26) Amalapuram, Andhra Pradesh, India
- Years active: 2015–present
- Height: 1.84 m (6 ft 0 in)
- Weight: 77 kg (170 lb)

Sport
- Country: India
- Sport: Badminton
- Handedness: Right
- Coached by: Tan Kim Her

Men's doubles
- Highest ranking: 1 (with Chirag Shetty, 10 October 2023)
- Current ranking: 6 (with Chirag Shetty, 10 November 2026)
- Honours: Khel Ratna Award; Arjuna Award; Guinness World Record
- BWF profile
Medal record
Men's badminton
Representing India
World Championships
Bronze medal – third place	2022 Tokyo	Men's doubles
Bronze medal – third place	2025 Paris	Men's doubles
Thomas Cup
Gold medal – first place	2022 Bangkok	Men's team
Bronze medal – third place	2026 Horsens	Men's team
Commonwealth Games
Gold medal – first place	2018 Gold Coast	Mixed team
Gold medal – first place	2022 Birmingham	Men's doubles
Silver medal – second place	2018 Gold Coast	Men's doubles
Silver medal – second place	2022 Birmingham	Mixed team
Asian Games
Gold medal – first place	2022 Hangzhou	Men's doubles
Silver medal – second place	2022 Hangzhou	Men's team
Bronze medal – third place	2026 Aichi–Nagoya	Men's team
Asian Championships
Gold medal – first place	2023 Dubai	Men's doubles
Asia Team Championships
Bronze medal – third place	2016 Hyderabad	Men's team
Bronze medal – third place	2020 Manila	Men's team

Satwiksairaj Rankireddy (born 13 August 2000) is an Indian badminton player. With his doubles partner Chirag Shetty, he has won double bronze medals at the World Championships as well as gold medals at the Asian Games, Asian Championships and Commonwealth Games. Rankireddy and Shetty are the only Indian doubles pair to reach number 1 in the world ranking and win the World Tour Super 1000. They are also the first Indians to win a gold medal at the Asian Games in badminton.

In 2023, Rankireddy achieved a Guinness World Record for the fastest hit in badminton by any player, with his smash reaching a speed of 565 km/h.

== Early life ==
Rankireddy was born on 13 August 2000 in Amalapuram, Andhra Pradesh. He started playing badminton after following in the footsteps of his father, who was a state-level player in the past, as well his elder brother. In 2014, he joined the Gopichand Badminton Academy in Hyderabad and decided to become a doubles specialist.

== Career ==
=== 2018 ===
In 2018, Rankireddy and Chirag Shetty played a crucial role in earning India the historic gold medal in the Mixed Team event at the 2018 Commonwealth Games, where they also won the men's doubles silver. They won their first BWF World Tour title in Hyderabad Open after beating the Indonesian pair of Akbar Bintang Cahyono and Muhammad Reza Pahlevi Isfahani in the final.

=== 2019 ===
In 2019, Rankireddy and Shetty became the first Indian doubles pair to win a BWF Superseries or BWF World Tour (Super 500+) title, when they won the Thailand Open title, beating the Chinese pair of Li Junhui and Liu Yuchen in the final. They followed it up with a runner-up finish at the French Open, where they lost in the final to the Indonesian pair of Marcus Fernaldi Gideon and Kevin Sanjaya Sukamuljo.

=== 2021 ===
In 2021, Rankireddy and Shetty lost to the Indonesian duo of Mohammad Ahsan and Hendra Setiawan in the second round to crash out of the 2020 Yonex Thailand Open. In July, he and Shetty competed at the 2020 Summer Olympics, but were eliminated in the group stage, following a loss to Marcus Fernaldi Gideon and Kevin Sanjaya Sukamuljo. However, they were the only pair in the entire tournament who defeated eventual gold medalists Lee Yang and Wang Chi-Lin, whom they had narrowly beaten in their first group stage encounter. In December, Rankireddy and Shetty qualified for the BWF World Tour Finals for the first time in their career, but withdrew from the tournament after a loss in their first group stage match to the Danish pair of Kim Astrup and Anders Skaarup Rasmussen.

=== 2022 ===
In 2022, Rankireddy and Shetty started the year by winning the India Open. They were also part of India's Thomas Cup winning team. In the final, having lost the first game to the Indonesian duo of Kevin Sanjaya Sukamuljo and Mohammad Ahsan, they displayed immense perseverance and tenacity to win the second game and close out the third game at 21–19, giving India a 2–0 lead over Indonesia. This was pivotal in helping India bag its maiden Thomas Cup trophy. Rankireddy and Shetty then won the men's doubles gold at the Birmingham Commonwealth Games, beating the home pair of Ben Lane and Sean Vendy in the final. At the BWF World Championships, Rankireddy and Shetty won a bronze medal, India's first-ever men's doubles medal at the tournament. They beat defending champions Takuro Hoki and Yugo Kobayashi in the quarter-finals, but lost in the semi-finals to eventual champions Aaron Chia and Soh Wooi Yik. They then won their first ever BWF World Super 750 title in the French Open by beating Chinese Taipei pair Lu Ching-yao and Yang Po-han in the finals.

=== 2023 ===
In 2023, Rankireddy and Shetty won their first title as a pair in the Swiss Open, beating the Chinese pair of Ren Xiangyu and Tan Qiang in the final. The duo also crowned as Asian Champion after winning the Asian Championships held in Dubai. The duo won their first BWF World Super 1000 title by defeating Aaron Chia and Soh Wooi Yik in the final of the Indonesia Open, thus becoming the first men's doubles pair from India to win the event. They went on to win Korea Open defeating Indonesian Pair Fajar Alfian and Muhammad Rian Ardianto.

Rankireddy set a new Guinness World Record for the fastest hit by a male player in badminton, with his smash reaching a speed of 565 km/h. The previous record of 493 km/h was held by Malaysian player Tan Boon Heong, set in May 2013.

=== 2024 ===
Together with Shetty, he reached the final of Super 1000 event of Malaysia Open and lost to the Chinese pair of Liang Weikeng and Wang Chang. Then they reached another final this year at India Open and again reached finals but lost to the Korean pair of Kang Min-hyuk and Seo Seung-jae in a tough game. Then they finally achieved success by winning their first tour of this year in Super 750 event of French Open defeating Chinese Taipei pair of Lee Jhe-huei and Yang Po-hsuan in straight games easily.

=== 2025 ===
The Malaysian Tan Kim Her who identified and paired Rankireddy with Shetty is back as their coach again. In the Malaysia and India Open, they reached the semi-finals.

== Awards and nominations ==
Year	Award	Category	Result	Ref(s)
2018	BWF Awards	Most Improved Players	Nominated	
2019	BWF Awards	Most Improved Players	Nominated	
2020	Arjuna Award	Good Performance in the Field of Sports	Won	
2023	Khel Ratna Award	Spectacular Performance in the Field of Sports	Won	
2023	BWF Awards	Men's Doubles Pair of the Year	Nominated	
2025	Times of India Sports Awards	Badminton Player of the Year Male	TBA	

== Achievements ==
=== World Championships ===
Year	Venue	Partner	Opponent	Score	Result
2022	Tokyo Metropolitan Gymnasium; Tokyo, Japan	(India) Chirag Shetty	(Malaysia) Aaron Chia (Malaysia) Soh Wooi Yik	22–20, 18–21, 16–21	Bronze
2025	Adidas Arena, Paris, France	(India) Chirag Shetty	(China) Chen Boyang (China) Liu Yi	19–21, 21–18, 12–21	Bronze

=== Commonwealth Games ===
Year	Venue	Partner	Opponent	Score	Result
2018	Carrara Sports and Leisure Centre; Gold Coast, Australia	(India) Chirag Shetty	(England) Marcus Ellis (England) Chris Langridge	13–21, 16–21	Silver
2022	National Exhibition Centre, Birmingham, England	(India) Chirag Shetty	(England) Ben Lane (England) Sean Vendy	21–15, 21–13	Gold

=== Asian Games ===
Year	Venue	Partner	Opponent	Score	Result
2022	Binjiang Gymnasium, Hangzhou, China	(India) Chirag Shetty	(South Korea) Choi Sol-gyu (South Korea) Kim Won-ho	21–18, 21–16	Gold

=== Asian Championships ===
Year	Venue	Partner	Opponent	Score	Result
2023	Sheikh Rashid Bin Hamdan Indoor Hall; Dubai, United Arab Emirates	(India) Chirag Shetty	(Malaysia) Ong Yew Sin (Malaysia) Teo Ee Yi	16–21, 21–17, 21–19	Gold

=== World Tour (11 titles, 8 runners-up) ===
The BWF World Tour, which was announced on 19 March 2017 and implemented in 2018, is a series of elite badminton tournaments sanctioned by the Badminton World Federation (BWF). The BWF World Tour is divided into levels of World Tour Finals, Super 1000, Super 750, Super 500, Super 300, and the BWF Tour Super 100.

Year	Tournament	Level	Partner	Opponent	Score	Result
2018	Hyderabad Open	Super 100	(India) Chirag Shetty	(Indonesia) Akbar Bintang Cahyono (Indonesia) Moh Reza Pahlevi Isfahani	21–16, 21–14	(gold) Winner
2018	Syed Modi International	Super 300	(India) Chirag Shetty	(Indonesia) Fajar Alfian (Indonesia) Muhammad Rian Ardianto	11–21, 20–22	(silver) Runner-up
2019	Thailand Open	Super 500	(India) Chirag Shetty	(China) Li Junhui (China) Liu Yuchen	21–19, 18–21, 21–18	(gold) Winner
2019	French Open	Super 750	(India) Chirag Shetty	(Indonesia) Marcus Fernaldi Gideon (Indonesia) Kevin Sanjaya Sukamuljo	18–21, 16–21	(silver) Runner-up
2022	India Open	Super 500	(India) Chirag Shetty	(Indonesia) Mohammad Ahsan (Indonesia) Hendra Setiawan	21–16, 26–24	(gold) Winner
2022	French Open	Super 750	(India) Chirag Shetty	(Chinese Taipei) Lu Ching-yao (Chinese Taipei) Yang Po-han	21–13, 21–19	(gold) Winner
2023	Swiss Open	Super 300	(India) Chirag Shetty	(China) Ren Xiangyu (China) Tan Qiang	21–19, 24–22	(gold) Winner
2023	Indonesia Open	Super 1000	(India) Chirag Shetty	(Malaysia) Aaron Chia (Malaysia) Soh Wooi Yik	21–17, 21–18	(gold) Winner
2023	Korea Open	Super 500	(India) Chirag Shetty	(Indonesia) Fajar Alfian (Indonesia) Muhammad Rian Ardianto	17–21, 21–13, 21–14	(gold) Winner
2023	China Masters	Super 750	(India) Chirag Shetty	(China) Liang Weikeng (China) Wang Chang	19–21, 21–18, 19–21	(silver) Runner-up
2024	Malaysia Open	Super 1000	(India) Chirag Shetty	(China) Liang Weikeng (China) Wang Chang	21–9, 18–21, 17–21	(silver) Runner-up
2024	India Open	Super 750	(India) Chirag Shetty	(South Korea) Kang Min-hyuk (South Korea) Seo Seung-jae	21–15, 11–21, 18–21	(silver) Runner-up
2024	French Open	Super 750	(India) Chirag Shetty	(Chinese Taipei) Lee Jhe-huei (Chinese Taipei) Yang Po-hsuan	21–11, 21–17	(gold) Winner
2024	Thailand Open	Super 500	(India) Chirag Shetty	(China) Chen Boyang (China) Liu Yi	21–15, 21–15	(gold) Winner
2025	Hong Kong Open	Super 500	(India) Chirag Shetty	(China) Liang Weikeng (China) Wang Chang	21–19, 14–21, 17–21	(silver) Runner-up
2025	China Masters	Super 750	(India) Chirag Shetty	(South Korea) Kim Won-ho (South Korea) Seo Seung-jae	19–21, 15–21	(silver) Runner-up
2026	Thailand Open	Super 500	(India) Chirag Shetty	(Indonesia) Leo Rolly Carnando (Indonesia) Daniel Marthin	12–21, 23–25	(silver) Runner-up
2026	Singapore Open	Super 750	(India) Chirag Shetty	(Indonesia) Fajar Alfian (Indonesia) Muhammad Shohibul Fikri	18–21, 21–17, 21–16	(gold) Winner
2026	China Masters	Super 750	(India) Chirag Shetty	(China) He Jiting (China) Ren Xiangyu	11–21, 21–13, 21–17	(gold) Winner

=== International Challenge / Series (10 titles) ===
Men's doubles
Year	Tournament	Partner	Opponent	Score	Result
2016	Mauritius International	(India) Chirag Shetty	(India) Dhruv Kapila (India) Saurabh Sharma	21–12, 21–16	(gold) Winner
2016	India International Series	(India) Chirag Shetty	(Malaysia) Goh Sze Fei (Malaysia) Nur Izzuddin	8–11, 11–5, 7–11, 11–8, 11–5	(gold) Winner
2016	Tata Open India International	(India) Chirag Shetty	(India) Arjun M.R. (India) Ramchandran Shlok	10–12, 11–9, 11–7, 11–5	(gold) Winner
2016	Bangladesh International	(India) Chirag Shetty	(India) M. Anilkumar Raju (India) Venkat Gaurav Prasad	17–21, 21–7, 21–8	(gold) Winner
2017	Vietnam International	(India) Chirag Shetty	(Thailand) Trawut Potieng (Thailand) Nanthakarn Yordphaisong	17–21, 21–9, 21–15	(gold) Winner
2019	Brazil International	(India) Chirag Shetty	(Netherlands) Jelle Maas (Netherlands) Robin Tabeling	21–14, 21–18	(gold) Winner

Mixed doubles
Year	Tournament	Partner	Opponent	Score	Result
2015	Tata Open India International	(India) K. Maneesha	(India) Arun Vishnu (India) Aparna Balan	21–13, 21–16	(gold) Winner
2016	Mauritius International	(India) K. Maneesha	(Malaysia) Yogendran Khrishnan (India) Prajakta Sawant	21–19, 11–21, 21–17	(gold) Winner
2016	India International Series	(India) K. Maneesha	(Malaysia) Low Hang Yee (Malaysia) Cheah Yee See	5–11, 11–8, 12–10, 11–8	(gold) Winner
2016	Bangladesh International	(India) K. Maneesha	(Thailand) Tanupat Viriyangkura (Thailand) Thanyasuda Wongya	21–12, 21–12	(gold) Winner

BWF International Challenge tournament
BWF International Series tournament
BWF Future Series tournament

=== Junior International (1 title, 1 runner-up) ===
Year	Tournament	Partner	Opponent	Score	Result
2014	India Junior International	(India) Krishna Prasad Garaga	(India) Arjun M. R. (India) Chirag Shetty	7–11, 10–11, 6–11	(silver) Runner-up
2015	India Junior International	(India) Krishna Prasad Garaga	(Thailand) W Sarapat (Thailand) Panachai Worasaktayanan	21–15, 21–17	(gold) Winner

BWF Junior International Grand Prix tournament
BWF Junior International Challenge tournament
BWF Junior International Series tournament
BWF Junior Future Series tournament

== Performance timeline ==
Key

W	Won	F	Finalist	SF	Semi-finalist
QF	Quarter-finalist	#R	Rounds 4, 3, 2, 1	RR	Round-robin stage
Q#	Qualification round	A	Absent	w/d	Withdrew
G	Gold	S	Silver	B	Bronze
NH	Not held	N/A	Not applicable	DNQ	Did not qualify

=== National team ===
- Junior level

Team events	2015	2016
World Junior Championships	9th	QF

- Senior level

Team events	2016	2017	2018	2019	2020	2021	2022	2023	2024	2025	2026
Asia Team Championships	B	NH	QF	NH	B	NH	A	NH	QF	NH	QF
Asia Mixed Team Championships	NH	QF	NH	A	NH			A	NH	QF	NH
Asian Games	NH		QF	NH			S	NH			B
Commonwealth Games	NH		G	NH			S	NH			
Thomas Cup	RR	NH	A	NH	QF	NH	G	NH	QF	NH	B
Sudirman Cup	NH	QF	NH	RR	NH	RR	NH	RR	NH	A	NH

=== Individual competitions ===
==== Junior level ====
- Boys' doubles

Events	2015	2016
World Junior Championships	3R	4R

- Mixed doubles

Events	2015	2016
World Junior Championships	2R	QF

==== Senior level ====
Events	2017	2018	2019	2020	2021	2022	2023	2024	2025	2026
Asian Championships	A			NH		QF	G	w/d	A	w/d
Asian Games	NH	2R	NH			G	NH			1R
Commonwealth Games	NH	S	NH			G	NH			
World Championships	1R	2R	A	NH	3R	B	QF	NH	B	QF
Olympic Games	NH			RR	NH			QF	NH	

Tournament	Superseries Grand Prix		World Tour									Best
Tournament	2016	2017	2018	2019	2020	2021	2022	2023	2024	2025	2026	Best
Malaysia Open	A	Q2	1R	A	NH		2R	SF	F	SF	QF	F ('24)
India Open	A	1R	2R	A	NH		W	2R	F	SF	2R	W ('22)
Indonesia Masters	A	NH	SF	A	1R	1R	A			2R	A	SF ('18)
All England Open	A		2R	A		2R	QF	2R	2R	2R	1R	QF ('22)
Swiss Open	A			QF	NH	SF	2R	W	A		QF	W ('23)
Thailand Open	A	A	1R	W	2R	NH	A	2R	W	A	F	W ('19, '24)
Thailand Open	A	A	1R	W	SF	NH	A	2R	W	A	F	W ('19, '24)
Malaysia Masters	A	1R	A		1R	NH	A					1R ('17, '20)
Singapore Open	A	Q2	2R	A	NH		A	1R	1R	SF	W	W ('26)
Indonesia Open	A	1R	1R	2R	NH	SF	A	W	w/d	QF	1R	W ('23)
Australian Open	A	2R	A	2R	NH		A			QF	A	QF ('22)
Macau Open	A				NH				A	QF	A	QF ('25)
U.S. Open	A	1R	A		NH			A				1R ('17)
Canada Open	A				NH		A					
Japan Open	A	1R	1R	QF	NH		A	QF	A	2R	1R	QF ('19, '23)
China Open	A	1R	1R	2R	NH			1R	A	SF	w/d	SF ('25)
China Masters	A		QF	SF	NH			F	SF	F	W	W ('26)
Denmark Open	A	1R	A	2R	A	2R	QF	A		SF	1R	SF ('25)
French Open	A	QF	SF	F	NH	QF	W	2R	W	1R	1R	W ('22, '24)
Hylo Open	A						QF	A				QF ('22)
Korea Open	A	QF	A	1R	NH		QF	W	A			W ('23)
Japan Masters	NH							1R	A		w/d	1R ('24)
Hong Kong Open	A		1R	1R	NH			A		F	SF	F ('25)
Syed Modi International	Q2	1R	F	1R	NH		A		w/d	A		F ('18)
Superseries / Tour Finals	DNQ					RR	DNQ			SF		SF ('25)
Dutch Open	A	1R	A		NH	NA						1R ('17)
Hyderabad Open	NA		W	A	NA							W ('18)
Spain Masters	NH		A				NH	1R	A	NH		1R ('23)
Year-end ranking	68	31	16	12	10	10	5	2	9	3		1

== Record against opponents ==
Men's doubles results with Chirag Shetty against Year-end Finals finalists, World Championships semi-finalists, and Olympic quarter-finalists. Accurate as of 5 September 2026.

Players	Matches	Results		Difference
Players	Matches	Won	Lost	Difference
(China) Fu Haifeng (China) Zhang Nan	1	0	1	–1
(China) Liang Weikeng (China) Wang Chang	14	4	10	–6
(China) Li Junhui (China) Liu Yuchen	3	2	1	+1
(China) Liu Cheng (China) Zhang Nan	1	0	1	–1
(China) Ou Xuanyi (China) Liu Yuchen	2	1	0	+1
(China) He Jiting (China) Tan Qiang	2	1	1	0
(China) Chen Boyang (China) Liu Yi	2	1	1	0
(Chinese Taipei) Chen Hung-ling (Chinese Taipei) Wang Chi-lin	1	0	1	–1
(Chinese Taipei) Lee Yang (Chinese Taipei) Wang Chi-lin	4	2	2	0
(Chinese Taipei) Lee Jhe-huei (Chinese Taipei) Yang Po-hsuan	7	7	0	+7
(Denmark) Mathias Boe (Denmark) Carsten Mogensen	5	1	4	–3
(Denmark) Kim Astrup (Denmark) Anders Skaarup Rasmussen	11	5	6	–1
(England) Marcus Ellis (England) Chris Langridge	3	2	1	+1
(Indonesia) Mohammad Ahsan (Indonesia) Hendra Setiawan	8	4	4	0

Players	Matches	Results		Difference
Players	Matches	Won	Lost	Difference
(Indonesia) Marcus Fernaldi Gideon (Indonesia) Kevin Sanjaya Sukamuljo	11	0	11	–11
(Japan) Takuro Hoki (Japan) Yugo Kobayashi	7	5	2	+3
(Japan) Hiroyuki Endo (Japan) Yuta Watanabe	4	2	2	0
(Japan) Takeshi Kamura (Japan) Keigo Sonoda	5	0	5	–5
(South Korea) Ko Sung-hyun (South Korea) Shin Baek-cheol	1	1	0	+1
(South Korea) Seo Seung-jae (South Korea) Kang Min-hyuk	8	5	3	+2
(South Korea) Seo Seung-jae (South Korea) Kim Won-ho	3	1	2	–1
(Malaysia) Aaron Chia (Malaysia) Soh Wooi Yik	17	6	11	–5
(Malaysia) Goh V Shem (Malaysia) Tan Wee Kiong	2	0	2	–2
(Malaysia) Ong Yew Sin (Malaysia) Teo Ee Yi	10	7	3	+4
(Malaysia) Goh Sze Fei (Malaysia) Nur Izzudin	10	8	2	+6

== See also ==
- Badminton in India
- India national badminton team
