= Yugo Kobayashi =

Japanese badminton player (born 1995)

Yūgo Kobayashi
- Kobayashi at the 2023 Singapore Open

Personal information
- Born: 10 July 1995 (age 31) Miyagi Prefecture, Japan
- Height: 1.75 m (5 ft 9 in)
- Weight: 72 kg (159 lb)

Sport
- Country: Japan
- Sport: Badminton
- Handedness: Left
- Coached by: Lee Wan Wah

Men's & mixed doubles
- Highest ranking: 1 (MD with Takuro Hoki, 20 September 2022); 25 (XD with Misaki Matsutomo, 9 August 2018)
- Current ranking: 10 (MD with Takuro Hoki, 10 November 2026)
- BWF profile
Medal record
Men's badminton
Representing Japan
World Championships
Gold medal – first place	2021 Huelva	Men's doubles
Silver medal – second place	2019 Basel	Men's doubles
Sudirman Cup
Silver medal – second place	2021 Vantaa	Mixed team
Bronze medal – third place	2023 Suzhou	Mixed team
Bronze medal – third place	2025 Xiamen	Mixed team
Thomas Cup
Bronze medal – third place	2020 Aarhus	Men's team
Bronze medal – third place	2022 Bangkok	Men's team
Asian Games
Bronze medal – third place	2022 Hangzhou	Men's team
Asian Championships
Bronze medal – third place	2023 Dubai	Men's doubles
Asia Mixed Team Championships
Silver medal – second place	2019 Hong Kong	Mixed team
Asia Team Championships
Gold medal – first place	2026 Qingdao	Men's team
Bronze medal – third place	2020 Manila	Men's team
World Junior Championships
Silver medal – second place	2012 Chiba	Mixed team
Asian Junior Championships
Gold medal – first place	2012 Gimcheon	Mixed team
Bronze medal – third place	2013 Kota Kinabalu	Mixed team

Yugo Kobayashi (小林 優吾, Kobayashi Yūgo; born 10 July 1995) is a Japanese badminton player affiliated with Tonami team. He was the men's doubles silver medalist at the 2019 World Championships and the men's doubles gold medalist at the 2021 World Championships, being first ever Japanese men's doubles to become world champions.

== Career ==
=== 2022–2024: World No. 1 ranking and Olympic debut ===
In 2022, Kobayashi was part of Japan's bronze-medal squad at the Thomas Cup in Bangkok. With Hoki, he won the Super 500 Thailand Open when Fajar Alfian and Muhammad Rian Ardianto retired during the final, then beat the same Indonesian pair to take the Super 750 Malaysia Open title. The Japanese duo became the first men's doubles pair from their country to reach world No. 1 on 20 September 2022. Kobayashi's efforts to improve his return of serve were also highlighted as a factor in the pair's development.

In 2023, Kobayashi and Hoki secured the Super 750 Singapore Open title, defeating Liang Weikeng and Wang Chang in the final. They were runners-up at the Japan Open and the Australian Open, and claimed bronze at the Asian Championships in Dubai. They also reached the semifinals at the Indonesia Masters, Malaysia Masters and China Open. In team competitions, Kobayashi was part of Japan's bronze-medal teams at the Sudirman Cup and the Asian Games in Hangzhou.

In 2024, Kobayashi and Hoki made four semifinals at Super 750 and Super 1000 tournaments: the Malaysia Open, India Open, French Open and All England Open. They made their Olympic debut at the Paris Summer Olympics, but did not advance beyond the round-robin phase of the men's doubles competition. In November, the pair reached their first final of the year at the Japan Masters, losing to Alfian and Ardianto.

=== 2025 ===
Kobayashi and Hoki began their 2025 season in April following Kobayashi's recovery from a knee injury. They made their return at the Asian Championships, where they were eliminated in the first round. In May, Kobayashi represented Japan at the Sudirman Cup in Xiamen, where the team earned bronze medals. That same month, Kobayashi and Hoki reached the semi-finals of the Malaysia Masters. The pair subsequently advanced to the quarter-finals of the Indonesia Open in June and the World Championships in August, followed by a semi-final appearance at the Korea Open in September. In October, Kobayashi and Hoki won their first title of the year at the Super 750 Denmark Open. They defeated the Indian duo Satwiksairaj Rankireddy and Chirag Shetty in the semifinals—their first victory over the pair in six years. They claimed the title by overcoming the Indonesian pair Fajar Alfian and Muhammad Shohibul Fikri.

=== 2026 ===
In January, Kobayashi and Hoki, reached the quarter-finals of both the Malaysia Open and the India Open. The following month, he was a member of the Japanese squad that secured the nation's first men's team title at the Asia Team Championships in Qingdao. Later in the season, the pair advanced to the second round at the All England Open in March and the Asian Championships in April. In April, Kobayashi withdrew from the Japanese squad for the Thomas Cup in Horsens due to an injury. In November, Kobayashi and Hoki reached back-to-back finals at two Super 500 tournaments, finishing as runners-up at both the Korea Open and Japan Masters.

== Records ==
- First Japanese men's doubles pair to win gold at the BWF World Championships (2021, partnered with Takuro Hoki).
- First Japanese men's doubles pair to win the season-ending BWF World Tour Finals (2021, partnered with Takuro Hoki).
- First Japanese men's doubles pair to attain the World No. 1 ranking (20 September 2022, partnered with Takuro Hoki).

== Achievements ==
=== World Championships ===
Men's doubles
Year	Venue	Partner	Opponent	Score	Result	Ref.
2019	St. Jakobshalle; Basel, Switzerland	(Japan) Takuro Hoki	(Indonesia) Mohammad Ahsan (Indonesia) Hendra Setiawan	23–25, 21–9, 15–21	Silver	
2021	Palacio de los Deportes Carolina Marín; Huelva, Spain	(Japan) Takuro Hoki	(China) He Jiting (China) Tan Qiang	21–12, 21–18	Gold	

=== Asian Championships ===
Men's doubles
Year	Venue	Partner	Opponent	Score	Result	Ref.
2023	Sheikh Rashid Bin Hamdan Indoor Hall; Dubai, United Arab Emirates	(Japan) Takuro Hoki	(Malaysia) Ong Yew Sin (Malaysia) Teo Ee Yi	16–21, 24–26	Bronze	

=== BWF World Tour (7 titles, 7 runners-up) ===
The BWF World Tour, which was announced on 19 March 2017 and implemented in 2018, is a series of elite badminton tournaments sanctioned by the Badminton World Federation (BWF). The BWF World Tours are divided into levels of World Tour Finals, Super 1000, Super 750, Super 500, Super 300, and the BWF Tour Super 100.

Men's doubles
Year	Tournament	Level	Partner	Opponent	Score	Result	Ref.
2018	Korea Open	Super 500	(Japan) Takuro Hoki	(Japan) Hiroyuki Endo (Japan) Yuta Watanabe	21–9, 15–21, 10–21	(silver) Runner-up	
2021	Denmark Open	Super 1000	(Japan) Takuro Hoki	(Denmark) Kim Astrup (Denmark) Anders Skaarup Rasmussen	21–18, 21–12	(gold) Winner	
2021	Indonesia Masters	Super 750	(Japan) Takuro Hoki	(Indonesia) Marcus Fernaldi Gideon (Indonesia) Kevin Sanjaya Sukamuljo	21–11, 17–21, 21–19	(gold) Winner	
2021	Indonesia Open	Super 1000	(Japan) Takuro Hoki	(Indonesia) Marcus Fernaldi Gideon (Indonesia) Kevin Sanjaya Sukamuljo	14–21, 18–21	(silver) Runner-up	
2021	BWF World Tour Finals	World Tour Finals	(Japan) Takuro Hoki	(Indonesia) Marcus Fernaldi Gideon (Indonesia) Kevin Sanjaya Sukamuljo	21–16, 13–21, 21–17	(gold) Winner	
2022	Thailand Open	Super 500	(Japan) Takuro Hoki	(Indonesia) Fajar Alfian (Indonesia) Muhammad Rian Ardianto	13–4^{r}	(gold) Winner	
2022	Malaysia Open	Super 750	(Japan) Takuro Hoki	(Indonesia) Fajar Alfian (Indonesia) Muhammad Rian Ardianto	24–22, 16–21, 21–9	(gold) Winner	
2023	Singapore Open	Super 750	(Japan) Takuro Hoki	(China) Liang Weikeng (China) Wang Chang	21–13, 21–18	(gold) Winner	
2023	Japan Open	Super 750	(Japan) Takuro Hoki	(Chinese Taipei) Lee Yang (Chinese Taipei) Wang Chi-lin	19–21, 13–21	(silver) Runner-up	
2023	Australian Open	Super 500	(Japan) Takuro Hoki	(South Korea) Kang Min-hyuk (South Korea) Seo Seung-jae	17–21, 17–21	(silver) Runner-up	
2024	Japan Masters	Super 500	(Japan) Takuro Hoki	(Indonesia) Fajar Alfian (Indonesia) Muhammad Rian Ardianto	15–21, 21–17, 17–21	(silver) Runner-up	
2025	Denmark Open	Super 750	(Japan) Takuro Hoki	(Indonesia) Fajar Alfian (Indonesia) Muhammad Shohibul Fikri	21–18, 15–21, 21–19	(gold) Winner	
2026	Korea Open	Super 500	(Japan) Takuro Hoki	(South Korea) Kim Won-ho (South Korea) Seo Seung-jae	12–21, 22–20, 19–21	(silver) Runner-up	
2026	Japan Masters	Super 500	(Japan) Takuro Hoki	(Malaysia) Aaron Tai (Malaysia) Yap Roy King	21–16, 13–21, 15–21	(silver) Runner-up	

=== BWF Grand Prix (1 title, 1 runner-up) ===
The BWF Grand Prix had two levels, the Grand Prix and Grand Prix Gold. It was a series of badminton tournaments sanctioned by the Badminton World Federation (BWF) and played between 2007 and 2017.

Men's doubles
Year	Tournament	Partner	Opponent	Score	Result	Ref.
2016	U.S. Open	(Japan) Takuro Hoki	(Denmark) Mathias Boe (Denmark) Carsten Mogensen	11–21, 20–22	(silver) Runner-up	

Mixed doubles
Year	Tournament	Partner	Opponent	Score	Result	Ref.
2016	U.S. Open	(Japan) Wakana Nagahara	(Poland) Robert Mateusiak (Poland) Nadieżda Zięba	21–16, 21–18	(gold) Winner	

BWF Grand Prix Gold tournament

=== BWF International Challenge/Series (2 titles) ===
Men's doubles
Year	Tournament	Partner	Opponent	Score	Result	Ref.
2014	USA International	(Japan) Takuro Hoki	(Canada) Adrian Liu (Canada) Derrick Ng	21–17, 21–19	(gold) Winner	
2016	Spanish International	(Japan) Takuro Hoki	(Denmark) Mathias Christiansen (Denmark) David Daugaard	21–10, 21–6	(gold) Winner	

BWF International Challenge tournament

== Record against selected opponents ==
Record against year-end Finals finalists, World Championships semi-finalists, and Olympic quarter-finalists. Accurate as of 27 September 2026.

=== Takuro Hoki ===
Players	M	W	L	Diff.
(China) Chai Biao & Hong Wei	1	0	1	–1
(China) Chen Boyang & Liu Yi	5	5	0	+5
(China) He Jiting & Tan Qiang	7	2	5	–3
(China) Li Junhui & Liu Yuchen	7	2	5	–3
(China) Liang Weikeng & Wang Chang	10	5	5	0
(China) Liu Cheng & Zhang Nan	5	2	3	–1
(China) Liu Yuchen & Ou Xuanyi	5	2	3	–1
(Chinese Taipei) Chen Hung-ling & Wang Chi-lin	2	2	0	+2
(Chinese Taipei) Lee Jhe-huei & Yang Po-hsuan	5	1	4	–3
(Chinese Taipei) Lee Yang & Wang Chi-lin	9	4	5	–1
(Denmark) Kim Astrup & Anders Skaarup Rasmussen	16	8	8	0
(Denmark) Mathias Boe & Carsten Mogensen	5	1	4	–3
(England) Marcus Ellis & Chris Langridge	1	0	1	–1
(India) Satwiksairaj Rankireddy & Chirag Shetty	7	2	5	–3
(Indonesia) Mohammad Ahsan & Rian Agung Saputro	1	0	1	–1
(Indonesia) Mohammad Ahsan & Hendra Setiawan	6	3	3	0

Players	M	W	L	Diff.
(Indonesia) Fajar Alfian & Muhammad Rian Ardianto	9	4	5	–1
(Indonesia) Marcus Fernaldi Gideon & Kevin Sanjaya Sukamuljo	15	4	11	–7
(Japan) Hiroyuki Endo & Yuta Watanabe	3	2	1	+1
(Japan) Takeshi Kamura & Keigo Sonoda	7	2	5	–3
(Malaysia) Aaron Chia & Soh Wooi Yik	12	9	3	+6
(Malaysia) Goh Sze Fei & Nur Izzuddin	7	3	4	–1
(Malaysia) Goh V Shem & Tan Wee Kiong	2	1	1	0
(Malaysia) Koo Kien Keat & Tan Boon Heong	1	0	1	–1
(Malaysia) Ong Yew Sin & Teo Ee Yi	11	9	2	+7
(Russia) Vladimir Ivanov & Ivan Sozonov	3	0	3	–3
(South Korea) Kang Min-hyuk & Seo Seung-jae	9	3	6	–3
(South Korea) Kim Gi-jung & Kim Sa-rang	1	1	0	+1
(South Korea) Kim Won-ho & Seo Seung-jae	6	0	6	–6
(South Korea) Ko Sung-hyun & Shin Baek-cheol	1	0	1	–1
(Thailand) Bodin Isara & Maneepong Jongjit	1	0	1	–1
(Thailand) Supak Jomkoh & Kittinupong Kedren	3	3	0	+3

=== Misaki Matsutomo ===
Players	M	W	L	Diff.
(China) Wang Yilyu & Huang Dongping	1	0	1	–1
(China) Zhang Nan & Li Yinhui	1	0	1	–1
(China) Zheng Siwei & Chen Qingchen	1	0	1	–1
(China) Zheng Siwei & Huang Yaqiong	1	0	1	–1
(England) Chris Adcock & Gabrielle Adcock	2	2	0	+2
(England) Marcus Ellis & Lauren Smith	1	0	1	–1
(Indonesia) Praveen Jordan & Debby Susanto	1	0	1	–1
(Indonesia) Tontowi Ahmad & Liliyana Natsir	1	0	1	–1

=== Wakana Nagahara ===
Players	M	W	L	Diff.
(Poland) Robert Mateusiak & Nadieżda Zięba	1	1	0	+1
