= Ong Yew Sin =

Malaysian badminton player (born 1995)

Ong Yew Sin 王耀新
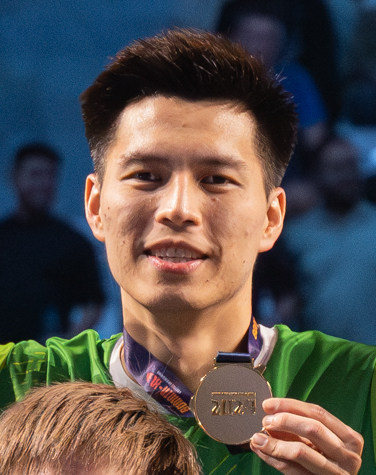
- Ong in 2024

Personal information
- Born: 30 January 1995 (age 31) Malacca, Malaysia
- Height: 1.82 m (6 ft 0 in)
- Spouse: Aya Ohori (m. 2025)

Sport
- Country: Malaysia
- Sport: Badminton
- Handedness: Right
- Coached by: Rosman Razak

Men's & mixed doubles
- Highest ranking: 6 (MD with Teo Ee Yi, 20 June 2023); 95 (XD with Goh Liu Ying, 27 December 2022)
- BWF profile
Medal record
Men's badminton
Representing Malaysia
World Championships
| Bronze medal – third place | 2021 Huelva | Men's doubles |
Sudirman Cup
| Bronze medal – third place | 2023 Suzhou | Mixed team |
Thomas Cup
| Bronze medal – third place | 2016 Kunshan | Men's team |
Asian Championships
| Silver medal – second place | 2023 Dubai | Men's doubles |
Asia Team Championships
| Silver medal – second place | 2020 Manila | Men's team |
| Bronze medal – third place | 2018 Alor Setar | Men's team |
SEA Games
| Silver medal – second place | 2017 Kuala Lumpur | Men's doubles |
| Silver medal – second place | 2017 Kuala Lumpur | Men's team |
| Silver medal – second place | 2019 Philippines | Men's team |
| Bronze medal – third place | 2019 Philippines | Men's doubles |

Ong Yew Sin (Chinese: 王耀新; pinyin: Wáng Yàoxīn, born 30 January 1995) is a Malaysian badminton player. A world championship bronze medalist, Asian championship silver medalist and SEA Games silver medalist, he and his former longtime partner Teo Ee Yi won a bronze medal in men's doubles at the 2021 BWF World Championships and a silver medal at the 2023 Badminton Asia Championships. Together, they reached a career-high world ranking of number six on 20 June 2023.

At the 2021 World Championships in Huelva, Spain, Ong and Teo defeated the reigning Olympic men's doubles champions Lee Yang and Wang Chi-lin in the quarterfinals to secure a bronze medal. At the 2023 Asian Championships in Dubai, they defeated several leading pairs, including world number one Fajar Alfian and Muhammad Rian Ardianto, before finishing runners-up to India's Satwiksairaj Rankireddy and Chirag Shetty in the final. The pair also won a silver medal in men's doubles at the 2017 SEA Games and a bronze medal at the 2019 SEA Games.

Together with Teo, Ong won the 2016 Bitburger Open and their first BWF World Tour title at the 2020 Thailand Masters, a Super 300 tournament, defeating China's Huang Kaixiang and Liu Cheng in the final. They also reached the finals of the 2019 Malaysia Masters and 2022 Australian Open, as well as the semifinals of the 2021 BWF World Tour Finals. In team competitions, Ong contributed to Malaysia's bronze medals at the 2016 Thomas Cup and 2023 Sudirman Cup, silver medal at the 2020 Badminton Asia Team Championships, and men's team silver medals at the 2017 and 2019 SEA Games.

After his partnership with Teo ended in 2026, Ong briefly partnered Lwi Sheng Hao at the 2026 Malaysia Masters. The partnership was intended only for that tournament, after which Ong took a break from international competition while considering his future playing arrangements. In June 2025, Ong married former Japanese women's singles player Aya Ohori.

== Personal life ==
Ong and former Japanese national player, Aya Ohori, announced their engagement in March 2025 and were married later that June.

== Career ==
Together with Teo Ee Yi, they won the 2016 Bitburger Open and earned a silver and a bronze medal at the 2017 and 2019 SEA Games respectively. They were also runners-up at the 2019 Malaysia Masters.

In January 2020, they were dropped from the national team by the Badminton Association of Malaysia. Following the incident, they went on to win their first World Tour title at the 2020 Thailand Masters. They were also semifinalists at the 2021 Indonesia Masters and the 2021 BWF World Tour Finals.

Their best achievement was winning the men's doubles silver medal at the 2023 Badminton Asia Championships after narrowly losing to Satwiksairaj Rankireddy and Chirag Shetty with a score of 21–16, 17–21, 19–21 in 66 minutes. They won a men's doubles bronze medal at the 2021 BWF World Championships, where they had to go through a narrow fight against Olympic champions Lee Yang and Wang Chi-lin in the quarterfinals. Because of their achievements, they were selected to be part of the Malaysian squad in the 2022 Thomas Cup.

== Achievements ==
=== BWF World Championships ===
Men's doubles
| Year | Venue | Partner | Opponent | Score | Result |
|---|---|---|---|---|---|
| 2021 | Palacio de los Deportes Carolina Marín, Huelva, Spain | (Malaysia) Teo Ee Yi | (Japan) Takuro Hoki (Japan) Yugo Kobayashi | 13–21, 9–21 | Bronze |

=== Asian Championships ===
Men's doubles
| Year | Venue | Partner | Opponent | Score | Result |
|---|---|---|---|---|---|
| 2023 | Sheikh Rashid Bin Hamdan Indoor Hall; Dubai, United Arab Emirates | (Malaysia) Teo Ee Yi | (India) Satwiksairaj Rankireddy (India) Chirag Shetty | 21–16, 17–21, 19–21 | Silver |

=== SEA Games ===
Men's doubles
| Year | Venue | Partner | Opponent | Score | Result |
|---|---|---|---|---|---|
| 2017 | Axiata Arena; Kuala Lumpur, Malaysia | (Malaysia) Teo Ee Yi | (Thailand) Kittinupong Kedren (Thailand) Dechapol Puavaranukroh | 19–21, 22–20, 17–21 | Silver |
| 2019 | Muntinlupa Sports Complex; Metro Manila, Philippines | (Malaysia) Teo Ee Yi | (Thailand) Bodin Isara (Thailand) Maneepong Jongjit | 12–21, 21–16, 19–21 | Bronze |

=== BWF World Tour (1 title, 2 runners-up) ===
The BWF World Tour, which was announced on 19 March 2017 and implemented in 2018, is a series of elite badminton tournaments sanctioned by the Badminton World Federation (BWF). The BWF World Tours are divided into levels of World Tour Finals, Super 1000, Super 750, Super 500, Super 300 (part of the HSBC World Tour), and the BWF Tour Super 100.

Men's doubles
| Year | Tournament | Level | Partner | Opponent | Score | Result |
|---|---|---|---|---|---|---|
| 2019 | Malaysia Masters | Super 500 | (Malaysia) Teo Ee Yi | (Indonesia) Marcus Fernaldi Gideon (Indonesia) Kevin Sanjaya Sukamuljo | 15–21, 16–21 | (silver) Runner-up |
| 2020 | Thailand Masters | Super 300 | (Malaysia) Teo Ee Yi | (China) Huang Kaixiang (China) Liu Cheng | 18–21, 21–17, 21–17 | (gold) Winner |
| 2022 | Australian Open | Super 300 | (Malaysia) Teo Ee Yi | (China) Liu Yuchen (China) Ou Xuanyi | 16–21, 20–22 | (silver) Runner-up |

=== BWF Grand Prix (1 title, 1 runner-up) ===
The BWF Grand Prix had two levels, the Grand Prix and Grand Prix Gold. It was a series of badminton tournaments sanctioned by the Badminton World Federation (BWF) and played between 2007 and 2017.

Men's doubles
| Year | Tournament | Partner | Opponent | Score | Result |
|---|---|---|---|---|---|
| 2016 | Bitburger Open | (Malaysia) Teo Ee Yi | (Germany) Michael Fuchs (Germany) Johannes Schöttler | 21–16, 21–18 | (gold) Winner |
| 2017 | New Zealand Open | (Malaysia) Teo Ee Yi | (Chinese Taipei) Chen Hung-ling (Chinese Taipei) Wang Chi-lin | 16–21, 18–21 | (silver) Runner-up |

BWF Grand Prix Gold tournament
BWF Grand Prix tournament

=== BWF International Challenge/Series (5 titles, 1 runner-up) ===
Men's doubles
| Year | Tournament | Partner | Opponent | Score | Result |
|---|---|---|---|---|---|
| 2014 | Vietnam International Series | (Malaysia) Low Juan Shen | (Malaysia) Jagdish Singh (Malaysia) Roni Tan Wee Long | 21–19, 21–13 | (gold) Winner |
| 2014 | Bangladesh International | (Malaysia) Low Juan Shen | (Malaysia) Darren Isaac Devadass (Malaysia) Tai An Khang | 19–21, 21–8, 21–13 | (gold) Winner |
| 2016 | Portugal International | (Malaysia) Teo Ee Yi | (Vietnam) Đỗ Tuấn Đức (Vietnam) Phạm Hồng Nam | 21–17, 24–22 | (gold) Winner |
| 2016 | Romanian International | (Malaysia) Teo Ee Yi | (Croatia) Zvonimir Đurkinjak (Croatia) Zvonimir Hölbling | 21–13, 21–9 | (gold) Winner |
| 2016 | Vietnam International | (Malaysia) Teo Ee Yi | (Japan) Kenya Mitsuhashi (Japan) Yuta Watanabe | 21–19, 21–14 | (gold) Winner |

Mixed doubles
| Year | Tournament | Partner | Opponent | Score | Result |
|---|---|---|---|---|---|
| 2016 | Romanian International | (Malaysia) Peck Yen Wei | (Malaysia) Wong Fai Yin (Malaysia) Shevon Jemie Lai | 15–21, 17–21 | (silver) Runner-up |

BWF International Challenge tournament
BWF International Series tournament
