= Yang Po-han =

Taiwanese badminton player (born 1994)

Yang Po-han 楊博涵
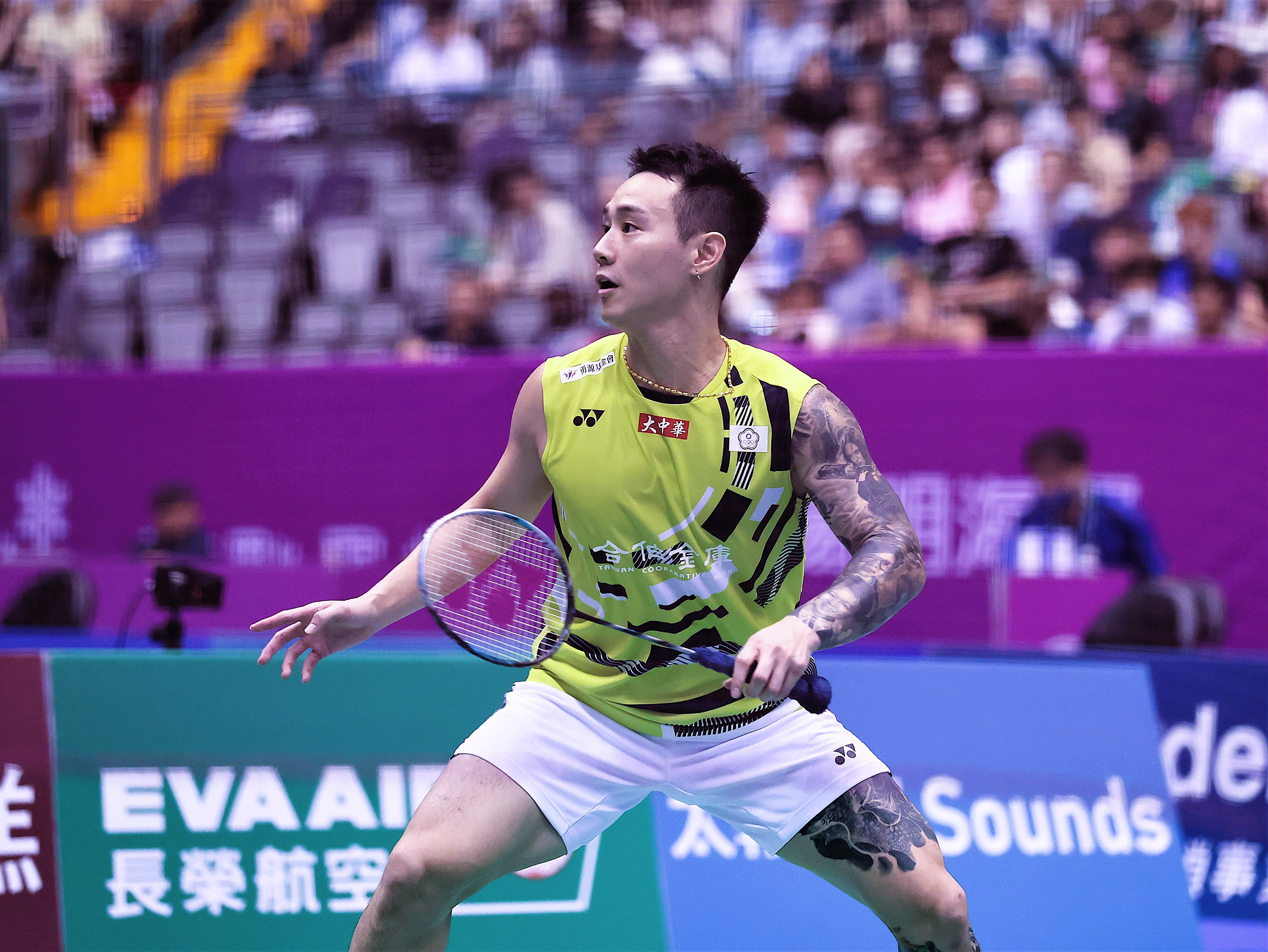
- Yang at the 2024 Taipei Open

Personal information
- Born: 13 March 1994 (age 32) Taipei, Taiwan
- Height: 1.72 m (5 ft 8 in)
- Weight: 63 kg (139 lb)

Sport
- Country: Republic of China (Taiwan)
- Sport: Badminton
- Handedness: Left

Men's & mixed doubles
- Highest ranking: 10 (MD with Lu Ching-yao, 16 November 2017); 133 (XD, 21 July 2016)
- Current ranking: 37 (MD with Liu Kuang-heng, 25 August 2026)
- BWF profile
Medal record
Men's badminton
Representing Chinese Taipei
Asian Games
Bronze medal – third place	2018 Jakarta–Palembang	Men's team

Yang Po-han (Chinese: 楊博涵; pinyin: Yáng Bóhán; born 13 March 1994) is a Taiwanese badminton player. In 2013, he won the men's doubles title at the Vietnam International tournament partnered with Liao Min-chun when he was 18-year-old.

== Achievements ==
=== BWF World Tour (1 title, 4 runners-up) ===
The BWF World Tour, which was announced on 19 March 2017 and implemented in 2018, is a series of elite badminton tournaments sanctioned by the Badminton World Federation (BWF). The BWF World Tours are divided into levels of World Tour Finals, Super 1000, Super 750, Super 500, Super 300 (part of the HSBC World Tour), and the BWF Tour Super 100.

Men's doubles
Year	Tournament	Level	Partner	Opponent	Score	Result
2019	Thailand Masters	Super 300	(Chinese Taipei) Lu Ching-yao	(Malaysia) Goh V Shem (Malaysia) Tan Wee Kiong	13–21, 17–21	(silver) Runner-up
2022	French Open	Super 750	(Chinese Taipei) Lu Ching-yao	(India) Satwiksairaj Rankireddy (India) Chirag Shetty	13–21, 19–21	(silver) Runner-up
2022	Hylo Open	Super 300	(Chinese Taipei) Lu Ching-yao	(Chinese Taipei) Lee Jhe-huei (Chinese Taipei) Yang Po-hsuan	11–21, 21–17, 25–23	(gold) Winner
2023	Taipei Open	Super 300	(Chinese Taipei) Lu Ching-yao	(Malaysia) Man Wei Chong (Malaysia) Tee Kai Wun	22–20, 17–21, 14–21	(silver) Runner-up
2024	U.S. Open	Super 300	(Chinese Taipei) Liu Kuang-heng	(Thailand) Peeratchai Sukphun (Thailand) Pakkapon Teeraratsakul	21–13, 16–21, 11–21	(silver) Runner-up

=== BWF Grand Prix (3 runners-up) ===
The BWF Grand Prix had two levels, the BWF Grand Prix and Grand Prix Gold. It was a series of badminton tournaments sanctioned by the Badminton World Federation (BWF) which was held from 2007 to 2017.

Men's doubles
Year	Tournament	Partner	Opponent	Score	Result
2017	Syed Modi International	(Chinese Taipei) Lu Ching-yao	(Denmark) Mathias Boe (Denmark) Carsten Mogensen	14–21, 15–21	(silver) Runner-up
2017	Thailand Masters	(Chinese Taipei) Lu Ching-yao	(China) Huang Kaixiang (China) Wang Yilyu	19–21, 23–21, 16–21	(silver) Runner-up
2017	U.S. Open	(Chinese Taipei) Lu Ching-yao	(Japan) Takuto Inoue (Japan) Yuki Kaneko	21–15, 13–21, 13–21	(silver) Runner-up

BWF Grand Prix Gold tournament
BWF Grand Prix tournament

=== BWF International Challenge/Series (5 titles, 2 runners-up) ===
Men's doubles
Year	Tournament	Partner	Opponent	Score	Result
2013	Vietnam International	(Chinese Taipei) Liao Min-chun	(Hong Kong) Chan Yun Lung (Hong Kong) Wong Wai Hong	30–28, 21–14	(gold) Winner
2015	Sydney International	(Chinese Taipei) Liu Wei-chen	(Malaysia) Jagdish Singh (Malaysia) Roni Tan Wee Long	21–13, 17–21, 11–21	(silver) Runner-up
2016	Waikato International	(Chinese Taipei) Liu Wei-chen	(Chinese Taipei) Su Ching-heng (Chinese Taipei) Yang Po-hsuan	22–20, 21–10	(gold) Winner
2016	Belgian International	(Chinese Taipei) Lu Ching-yao	(Denmark) Frederik Colberg (Denmark) Rasmus Fladberg	21–13, 21–13	(gold) Winner
2016	Polish International	(Chinese Taipei) Lu Ching-yao	(England) Christopher Coles (England) Gregory Mairs	21–16, 21–9	(gold) Winner
2016	Czech International	(Chinese Taipei) Lu Ching-yao	(Denmark) Mathias Bay-Smidt (Denmark) Frederik Søgaard	21–17, 20–22, 21–15	(gold) Winner
2016	Malaysia International	(Chinese Taipei) Lu Ching-yao	(Malaysia) Chooi Kah Ming (Malaysia) Low Juan Shen	9–21, 13–21	(silver) Runner-up

BWF International Challenge tournament
BWF International Series tournament
BWF Future Series tournament
