= Lu Ching-yao =

Taiwanese badminton player

Lu Ching-yao 盧敬堯
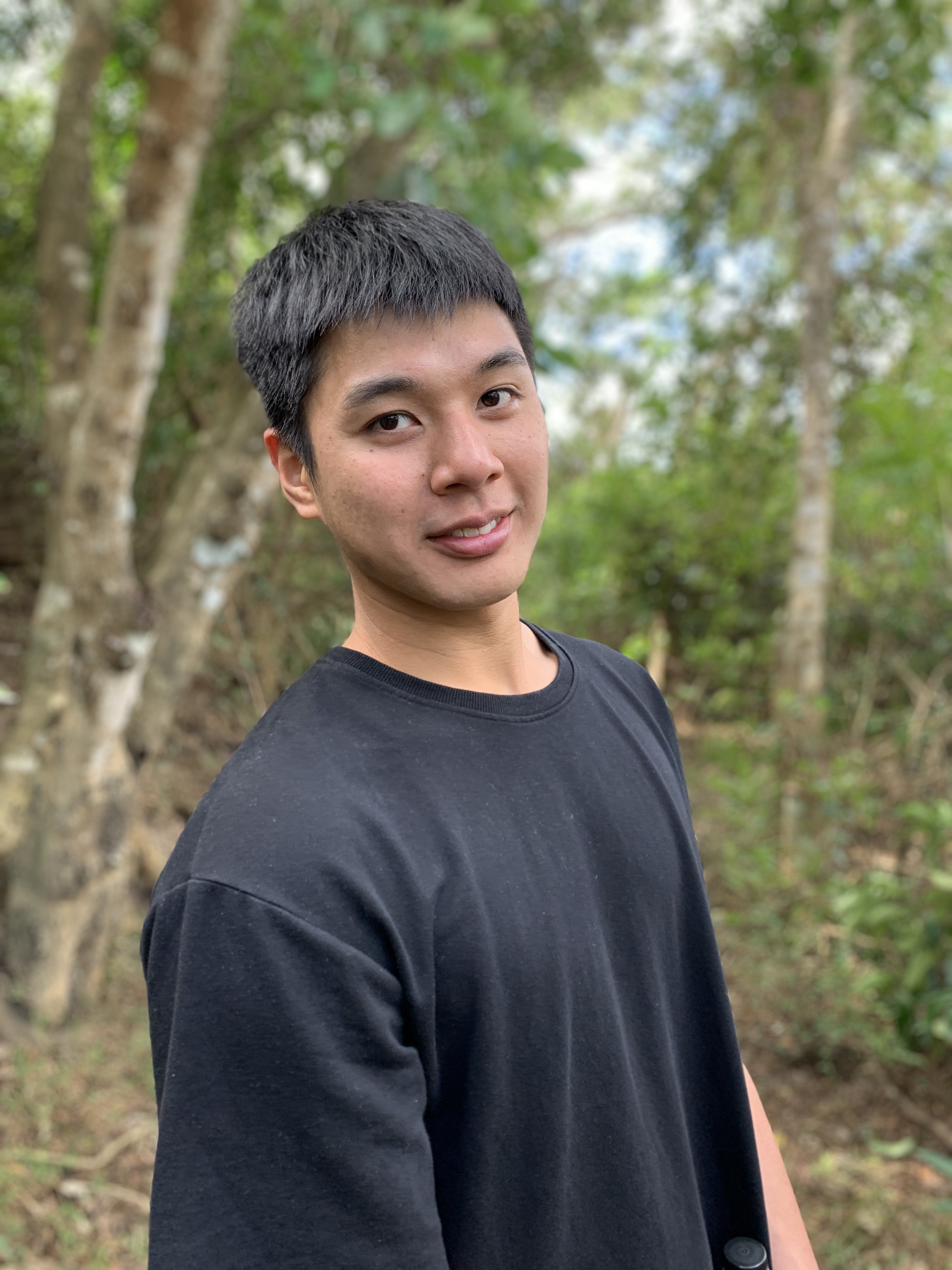

Personal information
- Born: 7 June 1993 (age 33) Kaohsiung, Taiwan
- Height: 1.90 m (6 ft 3 in)

Sport
- Country: Republic of China (Taiwan)
- Sport: Badminton
- Handedness: Right

Men's & mixed doubles
- Highest ranking: 10 (MD with Yang Po-han, 16 November 2017); 25 (XD with Chiang Kai-hsin, 24 August 2017)
- Current ranking: 37 (MD with Yang Po-han, 4 February 2025)
- BWF profile
Medal record
Men's badminton
Representing Chinese Taipei
Thomas Cup
Bronze medal – third place	2024 Chengdu	Men's team
Asian Games
Bronze medal – third place	2018 Jakarta–Palembang	Men's team
Summer Universiade
Silver medal – second place	2015 Gwangju	Mixed doubles
Asian Junior Championships
Silver medal – second place	2011 Lucknow	Boys' doubles

Lu Ching-yao (Chinese: 盧敬堯; pinyin: Lú Jìngyáo; born 7 June 1993) is a Taiwanese badminton player. He was the silver medalist at the 2011 Asian Junior Championships, and 2015 Summer Universiade. He won his first senior international title at the 2014 Singapore International Series tournament in the men's doubles event partnered with Huang Po-jui. Lu educated at the University of Taipei, department of Ball Sports.

== Achievements ==
=== Summer Universiade ===
Mixed doubles
Year	Venue	Partner	Opponent	Score	Result
2015	Hwasun Hanium Culture Sports Center; Hwasun, South Korea	(Chinese Taipei) Chiang Kai-hsin	(South Korea) Kim Gi-jung (South Korea) Shin Seung-chan	14–21, 11–21	Silver

=== Asian Junior Championships ===
Boys' doubles
Year	Venue	Partner	Opponent	Score	Result
2011	Babu Banarasi Das Indoor Stadium; Lucknow, India	(Chinese Taipei) Huang Chu-en	(Chinese Taipei) Huang Po-jui (Chinese Taipei) Lin Chia-yu	14–21, 13–21	Silver

=== BWF World Tour (1 title, 3 runners-up) ===
The BWF World Tour, which was announced on 19 March 2017 and implemented in 2018, is a series of elite badminton tournaments sanctioned by the Badminton World Federation (BWF). The BWF World Tours are divided into levels of World Tour Finals, Super 1000, Super 750, Super 500, Super 300 (part of the HSBC World Tour), and the BWF Tour Super 100.

Men's doubles
Year	Tournament	Level	Partner	Opponent	Score	Result
2019	Thailand Masters	Super 300	(Chinese Taipei) Yang Po-han	(Malaysia) Goh V Shem (Malaysia) Tan Wee Kiong	13–21, 17–21	(silver) Runner-up
2022	French Open	Super 750	(Chinese Taipei) Yang Po-han	(India) Satwiksairaj Rankireddy (India) Chirag Shetty	13–21, 19–21	(silver) Runner-up
2022	Hylo Open	Super 300	(Chinese Taipei) Yang Po-han	(Chinese Taipei) Lee Jhe-huei (Chinese Taipei) Yang Po-hsuan	11–21, 21–17, 25–23	(gold) Winner
2023	Taipei Open	Super 300	(Chinese Taipei) Yang Po-han	(Malaysia) Man Wei Chong (Malaysia) Tee Kai Wun	22–20, 17–21, 14–21	(silver) Runner-up

=== BWF Grand Prix (3 runners-up) ===
The BWF Grand Prix had two levels, the BWF Grand Prix and Grand Prix Gold. It was a series of badminton tournaments sanctioned by the Badminton World Federation (BWF) which was held from 2007 to 2017.

Men's doubles
Year	Tournament	Partner	Opponent	Score	Result
2017	Syed Modi International	(Chinese Taipei) Yang Po-han	(Denmark) Mathias Boe (Denmark) Carsten Mogensen	14–21, 15–21	(silver) Runner-up
2017	Thailand Masters	(Chinese Taipei) Yang Po-han	(China) Huang Kaixiang (China) Wang Yilyu	19–21, 23–21, 16–21	(silver) Runner-up
2017	U.S. Open	(Chinese Taipei) Yang Po-han	(Japan) Takuto Inoue (Japan) Yuki Kaneko	21–15, 13–21, 13–21	(silver) Runner-up

BWF Grand Prix Gold tournament
BWF Grand Prix tournament

=== BWF International Challenge/Series (5 titles, 4 runners-up) ===
Men's doubles
Year	Tournament	Partner	Opponent	Score	Result
2014	Finnish Open	(Chinese Taipei) Huang Po-jui	(Denmark) Kim Astrup (Denmark) Anders Skaarup Rasmussen	18–21, 17–21	(silver) Runner-up
2014	Singapore International	(Chinese Taipei) Huang Po-jui	(Malaysia) Jagdish Singh (Malaysia) Roni Tan Wee Long	21–14, 15–21, 21–16	(gold) Winner
2015	Vietnam International	(Chinese Taipei) Tien Tzu-chieh	(Singapore) Terry Hee Yong Kai (Singapore) Hendra Wijaya	21–13, 14–21, 23–21	(gold) Winner
2016	Belgian International	(Chinese Taipei) Yang Po-han	(Denmark) Frederik Colberg (Denmark) Rasmus Fladberg	21–13, 21–13	(gold) Winner
2016	Polish International	(Chinese Taipei) Yang Po-han	(England) Christopher Coles (England) Gregory Mairs	21–16, 21–9	(gold) Winner
2016	Czech International	(Chinese Taipei) Yang Po-han	(Denmark) Mathias Bay-Smidt (Denmark) Frederik Søgaard	21–17, 20–22, 21–15	(gold) Winner
2016	Malaysia International	(Chinese Taipei) Yang Po-han	(Malaysia) Chooi Kah Ming (Malaysia) Low Juan Shen	9–21, 13–21	(silver) Runner-up
2024 (II)	Indonesia International	(Chinese Taipei) Wu Guan-xun	(Indonesia) Rahmat Hidayat (Indonesia) Yeremia Rambitan	21–23, 21–23	(silver) Runner-up

Mixed doubles
Year	Tournament	Partner	Opponent	Score	Result
2013	Polish International	(Chinese Taipei) Pai Yu-po	(Chinese Taipei) Lin Chia-hsuan (Chinese Taipei) Hsu Ya-ching	21–12, 16–21, 18–21	(silver) Runner-up

BWF International Challenge tournament
BWF International Series tournament
BWF Future Series tournament
