= Badminton at the 2020 Summer Olympics =

Badminton at the Games of the XXXII Olympiad
- Venue: Musashino Forest Sport Plaza
- Dates: 24 July – 2 August 2021
- No. of events: 5
- Competitors: 172 from 49 nations

The badminton tournaments at the 2020 Summer Olympics in Tokyo took place between 24 July and 2 August 2021. A total of 172 athletes (86 male and 86 female players) competed in five events: men's singles, men's doubles, women's singles, women's doubles, and mixed doubles.

== Qualification ==
The Olympic qualification period was originally scheduled to take place between 29 April 2019 and 26 April 2020, and the Badminton World Federation rankings list, scheduled to publish on 30 April 2020. The Olympic qualification period was then set between 29 April 2019 and 6 June 2021, and the Badminton World Federation rankings list, published on 15 June 2021, was used to allocate spots. Nations were able to enter a maximum of two players each in the men's and women's singles, if both were ranked in the world's top 16; otherwise, one quota place until the roster of thirty-eight players had been completed. Similar regulations also applied to the players competing in the doubles, as the NOCs could enter a maximum of two pairs if both were ranked in the top eight, while the remaining NOC's were entitled to one until the quota of 16 highest-ranked pairs was filled. Additional rules ensured that each continent is represented in every event, guaranteed the host at least one quota place in each individual event, and assign additional quota places if players qualify in multiple events.

== Schedule ==
The tournament was held over a 10-day period.

Legend

P	Preliminaries	R	Round of 16	QF	Quarter-finals	SF	Semi-finals	M	Medal matches

Date	24 Jul		25 Jul		26 Jul		27 Jul		28 Jul		29 Jul		30 Jul		31 Jul		1 Aug		2 Aug	
Event	M	E	M	E	M	E	M	E	M	E	M	E	M	A	M	E	A	E	A	E
Men's singles	P									P		R			QF		SF			M
Men's doubles	P										QF			SF		M				
Women's singles	P										R		QF			SF		M		
Women's doubles	P											QF			SF				M	
Mixed doubles	P								QF		SF		M							

== Participating nations ==
A total of 172 badminton players from 49 National Olympic Committees (NOCs) across five continental confederations participate at the 2020 Summer Olympics.

- Australia (4)
- Austria (1)
- Azerbaijan (1)
- Belgium (1)
- Brazil (2)
- Bulgaria (3)
- Canada (8)
- China (14)
- Denmark (9)
- Egypt (3)
- Estonia (2)
- Finland (1)
- France (4)
- Germany (5)
- Great Britain (7)
- Guatemala (2)
- Hong Kong (4)
- Hungary (2)
- India (4)
- Indonesia (11)
- Iran (1)
- Ireland (1)
- Israel (2)
- Japan (13) (host)
- Malaysia (8)
- Maldives (1)
- Malta (1)
- Mauritius (1)
- Mexico (2)
- Myanmar (1)
- Netherlands (4)
- Nigeria (3)
- Pakistan (1)
- Peru (1)
- Refugee Olympic Team (1)
- ROC (4)
- Singapore (2)
- Slovakia (1)
- South Korea (10)
- Spain (2)
- Sri Lanka (1)
- Sweden (1)
- Switzerland (1)
- Chinese Taipei (5)
- Thailand (7)
- Turkey (1)
- Ukraine (2)
- United States (4)
- Vietnam (2)

== Medal summary ==
=== Medal table ===
* Host nation (Japan)

Rank	NOC	Gold	Silver	Bronze	Total
1	China	2	4	0	6
2	Chinese Taipei	1	1	0	2
3	Indonesia	1	0	1	2
4	Denmark	1	0	0	1
5	India	0	0	1	1
5	Japan*	0	0	1	1
5	Malaysia	0	0	1	1
5	South Korea	0	0	1	1
Totals (8 entries)		5	5	5	15

=== Medalists ===
Event	Gold	Silver	Bronze
Men's singles	Viktor Axelsen; Denmark	Chen Long; China	Anthony Sinisuka Ginting; Indonesia
Men's doubles	Chinese Taipei; Lee Yang; Wang Chi-lin	China; Li Junhui; Liu Yuchen	Malaysia; Aaron Chia; Soh Wooi Yik
Women's singles	Chen Yufei; China	Tai Tzu-ying; Chinese Taipei	P. V. Sindhu; India
Women's doubles	Indonesia; Greysia Polii; Apriyani Rahayu	China; Chen Qingchen; Jia Yifan	South Korea; Kim So-yeong; Kong Hee-yong
Mixed doubles	China; Wang Yilyu; Huang Dongping	China; Zheng Siwei; Huang Yaqiong	Japan; Yuta Watanabe; Arisa Higashino

== Results ==
=== Men's singles ===
Round of 16
C1	Kevin Cordón (GUA)	21	3	21
D1	Mark Caljouw (NED)	17	21	19
E1	Viktor Axelsen (DEN)	21	21
F1	Wang Tzu-wei (TPE)	16	14
G1	Jonatan Christie (INA)	11	9
H1	Shi Yuqi (CHN)	21	21
I1	Kanta Tsuneyama (JPN)	18	14
J1	Anthony Sinisuka Ginting (INA)	21	21
K1	Toby Penty (GBR)	10	15
L1	Anders Antonsen (DEN)	21	21
M1	Lee Zii Jia (MAS)	21	19	5
N1	Chen Long (CHN)	8	21	21

Quarter-finals
A1	Heo Kwang-hee (KOR)	13	18
C1	Kevin Cordón (GUA)	21	21
E1	Viktor Axelsen (DEN)	21	21
H1	Shi Yuqi (CHN)	13	13
J1	Anthony Sinisuka Ginting (INA)	21	15	21
L1	Anders Antonsen (DEN)	18	21	18
N1	Chen Long (CHN)	21	9	21
P1	Chou Tien-chen (TPE)	14	21	14

Semi-finals
C1	Kevin Cordón (GUA)	18	11
E1	Viktor Axelsen (DEN)	21	21
J1	Anthony Sinisuka Ginting (INA)	16	11
N1	Chen Long (CHN)	21	21

Gold medal match
E1	Viktor Axelsen (DEN)	21	21
N1	Chen Long (CHN)	15	12
Bronze medal match
C1	Kevin Cordón (GUA)	11	13
J1	Anthony Sinisuka Ginting (INA)	21	21

=== Women's singles ===
Round of 16
C1	An Se-young (KOR)	21	21
D1	Busanan Ongbamrungphan (THA)	15	15
E1	Nozomi Okuhara (JPN)	21	21
F1	Michelle Li (CAN)	9	7
G1	He Bingjiao (CHN)	14	9
H1	Beiwen Zhang (USA)	21	7^{r}
I1	Mia Blichfeldt (DEN)	15	13
J1	P. V. Sindhu (IND)	21	21
K1	Kim Ga-eun (KOR)	17	18
L1	Akane Yamaguchi (JPN)	21	21
M1	Gregoria Mariska Tunjung (INA)	12	19
N1	Ratchanok Intanon (THA)	21	21

Quarter-finals
A1	Chen Yufei (CHN)	21	21
C1	An Se-young (KOR)	18	19
E1	Nozomi Okuhara (JPN)	21	13	14
G1	He Bingjiao (CHN)	13	21	21
J1	P. V. Sindhu (IND)	21	22
L1	Akane Yamaguchi (JPN)	13	20
N1	Ratchanok Intanon (THA)	21	18	18
P1	Tai Tzu-ying (TPE)	14	21	21

Semi-finals
A1	Chen Yufei (CHN)	21	13	21
G1	He Bingjiao (CHN)	16	21	12
J1	P. V. Sindhu (IND)	18	12
P1	Tai Tzu-ying (TPE)	21	21

Gold medal match
A1	Chen Yufei (CHN)	21	19	21
P1	Tai Tzu-ying (TPE)	18	21	18
Bronze medal match
G1	He Bingjiao (CHN)	13	15
J1	P. V. Sindhu (IND)	21	21

=== Men's doubles ===
Quarter-finals
A1	Marcus Fernaldi Gideon (INA); Kevin Sanjaya Sukamuljo (INA)	14	17
D2	Aaron Chia (MAS); Soh Wooi Yik (MAS)	21	21
C1	Li Junhui (CHN); Liu Yuchen (CHN)	12	21	21
B2	Kim Astrup (DEN); Anders Skaarup Rasmussen (DEN)	21	14	19
A2	Lee Yang (TPE); Wang Chi-lin (TPE)	21	21
B1	Hiroyuki Endo (JPN); Yuta Watanabe (JPN)	16	19
C2	Takeshi Kamura (JPN); Keigo Sonoda (JPN)	14	21	9
D1	Mohammad Ahsan (INA); Hendra Setiawan (INA)	21	16	21

Semi-finals
D2	Aaron Chia (MAS); Soh Wooi Yik (MAS)	22	13
C1	Li Junhui (CHN); Liu Yuchen (CHN)	24	21
A2	Lee Yang (TPE); Wang Chi-lin (TPE)	21	21
D1	Mohammad Ahsan (INA); Hendra Setiawan (INA)	11	10

Gold medal match
C1	Li Junhui (CHN); Liu Yuchen (CHN)	18	12
A2	Lee Yang (TPE); Wang Chi-lin (TPE)	21	21
Bronze medal match
D2	Aaron Chia (MAS); Soh Wooi Yik (MAS)	17	21	21
D1	Mohammad Ahsan (INA); Hendra Setiawan (INA)	21	17	14

=== Women's doubles ===
Quarter-finals
A1	Greysia Polii (INA); Apriyani Rahayu (INA)	21	20	21
C2	Du Yue (CHN); Li Yinhui (CHN)	15	22	17
C1	Lee So-hee (KOR); Shin Seung-chan (KOR)	21	21
B2	Selena Piek (NED); Cheryl Seinen (NED)	8	17
D2	Kim So-yeong (KOR); Kong Hee-yong (KOR)	21	14	28
B1	Mayu Matsumoto (JPN); Wakana Nagahara (JPN)	14	21	26
A2	Yuki Fukushima (JPN); Sayaka Hirota (JPN)	21	10	10
D1	Chen Qingchen (CHN); Jia Yifan (CHN)	18	21	21

Semi-finals
A1	Greysia Polii (INA); Apriyani Rahayu (INA)	21	21
C1	Lee So-hee (KOR); Shin Seung-chan (KOR)	19	17
D2	Kim So-yeong (KOR); Kong Hee-yong (KOR)	15	11
D1	Chen Qingchen (CHN); Jia Yifan (CHN)	21	21

Gold medal match
A1	Greysia Polii (INA); Apriyani Rahayu (INA)	21	21
D1	Chen Qingchen (CHN); Jia Yifan (CHN)	19	15
Bronze medal match
C1	Lee So-hee (KOR); Shin Seung-chan (KOR)	10	17
D2	Kim So-yeong (KOR); Kong Hee-yong (KOR)	21	21

=== Mixed doubles ===
Quarter-finals
A1	Zheng Siwei (CHN); Huang Yaqiong (CHN)	21	21
C2	Praveen Jordan (INA); Melati Daeva Oktavianti (INA)	17	15
B1	Marcus Ellis (GBR); Lauren Smith (GBR)	13	18
D2	Tang Chun Man (HKG); Tse Ying Suet (HKG)	21	21
C1	Yuta Watanabe (JPN); Arisa Higashino (JPN)	15	21	21
B2	Dechapol Puavaranukroh (THA); Sapsiree Taerattanachai (THA)	21	16	14
A2	Seo Seung-jae (KOR); Chae Yoo-jung (KOR)	9	16
D1	Wang Yilyu (CHN); Huang Dongping (CHN)	21	21

Semi-finals
A1	Zheng Siwei (CHN); Huang Yaqiong (CHN)	21	21
D2	Tang Chun Man (HKG); Tse Ying Suet (HKG)	16	12
C1	Yuta Watanabe (JPN); Arisa Higashino (JPN)	23	15	14
D1	Wang Yilyu (CHN); Huang Dongping (CHN)	21	21	21

Gold medal match
A1	Zheng Siwei (CHN); Huang Yaqiong (CHN)	17	21	19
D1	Wang Yilyu (CHN); Huang Dongping (CHN)	21	17	21
Bronze medal match
D2	Tang Chun Man (HKG); Tse Ying Suet (HKG)	17	21
C1	Yuta Watanabe (JPN); Arisa Higashino (JPN)	21	23

== See also ==
- Badminton at the 2018 Asian Games
- Badminton at the 2018 Summer Youth Olympics
- Badminton at the 2019 African Games
- Badminton at the 2019 European Games
- Badminton at the 2019 Pan American Games
- Badminton at the 2020 Summer Paralympics
