= Indonesia at the 2020 Summer Olympics =

- IOC code: INA
- NOC: Indonesian Olympic Committee
- Website: www.nocindonesia.id (in Indonesian)

in Tokyo, Japan July 23, 2021 – August 8, 2021
- Competitors: 28 in 8 sports
- Flag bearer (opening): Rio Waida (Note: Originally, surfer Rio Waida and weightlifter Nurul Akmal were named as co-flagbearers for the parade of nations during the opening ceremony. In fact, Rio eventually became the sole flagbearer.)
- Flag bearer (closing): Games Volunteer – TOCOG
- Medals Ranked 55th: Gold 1 Silver 1 Bronze 3 Total 5

Summer Olympics appearances (overview)
- 1952; 1956; 1960; 1964; 1968; 1972; 1976; 1980; 1984; 1988; 1992; 1996; 2000; 2004; 2008; 2012; 2016; 2020; 2024; 2028

Other related appearances
- Individual Olympic Athletes (2000); Timor-Leste (2004–pres.)

Indonesia competed at the 2020 Summer Olympics in Tokyo. Originally scheduled to take place from 24 July to 9 August 2020, the Games were rescheduled for 23 July to 8 August 2021, due to the COVID-19 pandemic. It was the nation's sixteenth appearance at the Summer Olympics.

At the Games, Indonesia sent 28 athletes; the similar total with 2016 Summer Olympics. It consisted of 16 men and 12 women, competing in 8 sports. Twenty-five Indonesians had qualified to compete, while two swimmers and one female sprinter obtained their spots through wild card entries. In this edition, surfing made its Olympic debut (as new sport) by Rio Waida, who became the nation's de facto flag bearer at the opening ceremony.

The Indonesian roster featured seven returning Olympians, with three of them headed to their third Games: badminton shuttler Greysia Polii in the women's doubles badminton, 2008 Olympic gold medalist Hendra Setiawan in men's doubles badminton together with his partner Mohammad Ahsan, two-time Olympian Praveen Jordan in mixed doubles badminton, three-time Olympic bronze and silver medalists Eko Yuli Irawan in weightlifting, three-time Olympian Deni in weightlifting, and two-time Olympian Riau Ega Agatha in archery.

Indonesia left Tokyo with five medals (one gold, one silver and three bronzes), improving its total medal tally from the previous Olympics. Greysia Polii and Apriyani Rahayu, who won the women's doubles event of badminton, are the country's only gold medalists. Their victory made Indonesia the second country after China to have won gold medals in all five disciplines of badminton at the Olympics. At 33 years and 356 days of age, Polii also became the oldest female badminton player to win an Olympic gold medal.

== Medalists ==
Medal	Name	Sport	Event	Date
Gold	Greysia Polii; Apriyani Rahayu	Badminton	Women's doubles	2 August
Silver	Eko Yuli Irawan	Weightlifting	Men's 61 kg	25 July
Bronze	Windy Cantika Aisah	Weightlifting	Women's 49 kg	24 July
Bronze	Rahmat Erwin Abdullah	Weightlifting	Men's 73 kg	28 July
Bronze	Anthony Sinisuka Ginting	Badminton	Men's singles	2 August

Medals by sport
Sport	1st place, gold medalist(s)	2nd place, silver medalist(s)	3rd place, bronze medalist(s)	Total
Badminton	1	0	1	2
Weightlifting	0	1	2	3
Total	1	1	3	5

Medals by gender
Gender	1st place, gold medalist(s)	2nd place, silver medalist(s)	3rd place, bronze medalist(s)	Total
Female	1	0	1	2
Male	0	1	2	3
Mixed	0	0	0	0
Total	1	1	3	5

Medals by date
Date	1st place, gold medalist(s)	2nd place, silver medalist(s)	3rd place, bronze medalist(s)	Total
24 July	0	0	1	1
25 July	0	1	0	1
28 July	0	0	1	1
2 August	1	0	1	2
Total	1	1	3	5

== Background ==
=== Administration ===
On 31 December 2019, Roslan Roeslani was officially appointed as the Chef de Mission of the Indonesian Team for Tokyo 2020 Summer Olympics by the President of the Indonesian Olympic Committee, Raja Sapta Oktohari.

=== Opening ceremony ===
During the Parade of Nations, flag bearer Rio Waida wore a Balinese traditional attire - Payas Madya to represent his current home town and a pair of Tatami sandals to represent Japan as his second home and the host of the Olympics.

=== Broadcasters ===
Name	Type	Ref
Emtek	Free-to-air, Pay and over-the-top	
TVRI	Free-to-air	

== Competitors ==
The following is the list of number of competitors in the Games.

Sport	Men	Women	Total
Archery	3	1	4
Athletics	1	1	2
Badminton	7	4	11
Rowing	0	2	2
Shooting	0	1	1
Surfing	1	0	1
Swimming	1	1	2
Weightlifting	3	2	5
Total	16	12	28

== Archery ==
Three Indonesian archers qualified for the men's events by securing the last of three quota places available in the team recurve at the 2021 WA Final Qualification Tournament in Paris, France. Another Indonesian archer captured a silver medal in the women's individual recurve to book an outright berth available at the 2018 Asian Games in Jakarta.

Athlete	Event	Ranking round		Round of 64	Round of 32	Round of 16	Quarter-finals	Semi-finals	GM / BM	
Athlete	Event	Score	Seed	Opposition Score	Opposition Score	Opposition Score	Opposition Score	Opposition Score	Opposition Score	Rank
Riau Ega Agatha	Men's individual	666	15	Barnes (AUS); W 7–1	Wukie (USA); L 5–6	Did not advance				
Alviyanto Prastyadi	Men's individual	658	26	Worth (AUS); L 0–6	Did not advance					
Arif Dwi Pangestu	Men's individual	655	32	Unruh (GER); L 2–6	Did not advance					
Riau Ega Agatha; Arif Dwi Pangestu; Alviyanto Prastyadi	Men's team	1979	7	—N/a		Great Britain; L 0–6	Did not advance			
Diananda Choirunisa	Women's individual	631	40	Jager (DEN); L 2–6	Did not advance					
Riau Ega Agatha; Diananda Choirunisa	Mixed team	1297	15 Q	—N/a		United States; W 5–4	Turkey; L 2–6	Did not advance		

== Athletics ==
Indonesian athletes further achieved the entry standards, either by qualifying time or by world ranking, in the following track and field events (up to a maximum of 3 athletes in each event):

Key

- Note–Ranks given for track events are within the athlete's heat only
- Q = Qualified for the next round
- q = Qualified for the next round as a fastest loser or, in field events, by position without achieving the qualifying target
- NR = National record
- N/A = Round not applicable for the event
- Bye = Athlete not required to compete in round

Track & road events

Athlete	Event	Heat		Quarter-final		Semi-final		Final	
Athlete	Event	Result	Rank	Result	Rank	Result	Rank	Result	Rank
Lalu Muhammad Zohri	Men's 100 m	Bye		10.26	5	Did not advance			
Alvin Tehupeiory	Women's 100 m	11.89	3 Q	11.92	8	Did not advance			

== Badminton ==
Indonesia entered eleven badminton players (seven men and four women) for each of the following events into the Olympic tournament based on the BWF World Race to Tokyo Rankings; two entries each in the men's singles and doubles and one each in the women's singles, women's doubles, and mixed doubles.

Men

Athlete	Event	Group stage				Elimination	Quarter-final	Semi-final	Final / BM	
Athlete	Event	Opposition Score	Opposition Score	Opposition Score	Rank	Opposition Score	Opposition Score	Opposition Score	Opposition Score	Rank
Jonatan Christie	Singles	Mahmoud (EOR); W (21–8, 21–14)	Loh K Y (SGP); W (22–20, 13–21, 21–18)	—N/a	1 Q	Shi Yq (CHN); L (11–21, 9–21)	Did not advance			
Anthony Ginting	Singles	Krausz (HUN); W (21–13, 21–8)	Sirant (ROC); W (21–12, 21–10)	—N/a	1 Q	Tsuneyama (JPN); W (21–18, 21–14)	Antonsen (DEN); W (21–18, 15–21, 21–18)	Chen L (CHN); L (16–21, 11–21)	Cordón (GUA); W (21–11, 21–13)	3rd place, bronze medalist(s)
Mohammad Ahsan; Hendra Setiawan	Doubles	Ho-shue / Yakura (CAN); W (21–12, 21–11)	Chia / Soh W Y (MAS); W (21–16, 21–19)	Choi S-g / Seo S-j (KOR); W (21–12, 19–21, 21–18)	1 Q	—N/a	Kamura / Sonoda (JPN); W (21–14, 16–21, 21–9)	Lee Y / Wang C-l (TPE); L (11–21, 10–21)	Chia / Soh W Y (MAS); L (21–17, 17–21, 14–21)	4
Marcus Fernaldi Gideon; Kevin Sukamuljo	Doubles	Lane / Vendy (GBR); W (21–15, 21–11)	Rankireddy / Shetty (IND); W (21–13, 21–12)	Lee Y / Wang C-l (TPE); L (18–21, 21–15, 17–21)	1 Q	—N/a	Chia / Soh (MAS); L (14–21, 17–21)	Did not advance		

Women

Athlete	Event	Group stage				Elimination	Quarter-final	Semi-final	Final / BM	
Athlete	Event	Opposition Score	Opposition Score	Opposition Score	Rank	Opposition Score	Opposition Score	Opposition Score	Opposition Score	Rank
Gregoria Mariska Tunjung	Singles	Thet Htar (MYA); W (21–11, 21–8)	Tan (BEL); W (21–11, 21–17)	—N/a	1 Q	Intanon (THA); L (12–21, 19–21)	Did not advance			
Greysia Polii; Apriyani Rahayu	Doubles	Chow M K / Lee M Y (MAS); W (21–14, 21–17)	Birch / Smith (GBR); W (21–11, 21–13)	Fukushima / Hirota (JPN); W (24–22, 13–21, 21–8)	1 Q	—N/a	Du Y / Li Yh (CHN); W (21–15, 20–22, 21–17)	Lee S-h / Shin S-c (KOR); W (21–19, 21–17)	Chen Qc / Jia Yf (CHN); W (21–19, 21–15)	1st place, gold medalist(s)

Mixed

Athlete	Event	Group stage				Quarter-finals	Semi-finals	GM / BM	
Athlete	Event	Opposition Score	Opposition Score	Opposition Score	Rank	Opposition Score	Opposition Score	Opposition Score	Rank
Praveen Jordan; Melati Daeva Oktavianti	Doubles	Leung / Somerville (AUS); W (20–22, 21–17, 21–13)	Christiansen / Bøje (DEN); W (24–22, 21–19 )	Watanabe / Higashino (JPN); L (13–21, 10–21)	2 Q	Zheng Sw / Huang Yq (CHN); L (17–21, 15–21)	Did not advance		

== Rowing ==
Indonesia qualified one boat in the women's lightweight double sculls for the Games by finishing fourth in the A-final and securing the last of three berths available at the 2021 FISA Asia & Oceania Olympic Qualification Regatta in Tokyo, Japan.

Athlete	Event	Heat		Repechage		Semi-final		Final	
Athlete	Event	Time	Rank	Time	Rank	Time	Rank	Time	Rank
Melani Putri; Mutiara Rahma Putri	Women's lightweight double sculls	7:52.57	6 R	8:03.19	6 FC	Bye		7:25.06	17

Qualification Legend: FA=Final A (medal); FB=Final B (non-medal); FC=Final C (non-medal); FD=Final D (non-medal); FE=Final E (non-medal); FF=Final F (non-medal); SA/B=Semi-finals A/B; SC/D=Semi-finals C/D; SE/F=Semi-finals E/F; QF=Quarter-finals; R=Repechage

== Shooting ==
For the first time since 2012, Indonesia entered one shooter after achieved quota places for the following events by virtue of their best finishes at the 2018 ISSF World Championships, the 2019 ISSF World Cup series, and Asian Championships, as long as they obtained a minimum qualifying score (MQS) by May 31, 2020.

Athlete	Event	Qualification		Final	
Athlete	Event	Points	Rank	Points	Rank
Vidya Rafika Toyyiba	Women's 10 m air rifle	622.0	35	Did not advance	
Vidya Rafika Toyyiba	Women's 50 m rifle 3 positions	1137	37	Did not advance	

== Surfing ==
Indonesia sent one surfer to compete in the men's shortboard at the Games. Rio Waida accepted a spare berth previously allocated by Japan's Shun Murakami, as a runner-up in the provisional rankings from the Asian zone at the 2019 ISA World Surfing Games.

Athlete	Event	Round 1		Round 2		Elimination	Quarterfinal	Semifinal	Final / BM	
Athlete	Event	Points	Rank	Points	Rank	Opposition Result	Opposition Result	Opposition Result	Opposition Result	Rank
Rio Waida	Men's shortboard	9.96	3 q	11.53	2 Q	Igarashi (JPN); L 12.00–14.00	Did not advance			

Qualification Legend: Q= Qualified directly for the third round; q = Qualified for the second round

== Swimming ==
Indonesia received a universality invitation from FINA to send two top-ranked swimmers (one per gender) in their respective individual events to the Olympics, based on the FINA Points System of June 28, 2021.

Athlete	Event	Heat		Final	
Athlete	Event	Time	Rank	Time	Rank
Aflah Fadlan Prawira	Men's 400 m freestyle	3:55.08	29	Did not advance	
Aflah Fadlan Prawira	Men's 1500 m freestyle	15:29.94	27	Did not advance	
Azzahra Permatahani	Women's 400 m individual medley	4:54.54	16	Did not advance	

== Weightlifting ==
Indonesia entered five weightlifters into the Olympic competition. 2018 world champion, three-time Olympian, and triple medalist Eko Yuli Irawan (men's 61 kg), 2019 Southeast Asian Games champion and two-time Olympian, Deni (men's 67 kg), 2020 world junior champion Windy Cantika Aisah (women's 49 kg), and Nurul Akmal (women's +87 kg) secured one of the top eight slots each in their respective weight divisions based on the IWF Absolute World Rankings, with 2019 Asian junior champion Rahmat Erwin Abdullah topping the field of weightlifters from the Asian zone in the men's 73 kg category based on the IWF Absolute Continental Rankings.

Windy Cantika Aisah claimed the first medal for Indonesia contingent after winning the bronze medal in the women's 49 kg event with 194 kg lift in total.

Athlete	Event	Snatch		Clean & Jerk		Total	Rank
Athlete	Event	Result	Rank	Result	Rank	Total	Rank
Eko Yuli Irawan	Men's −61 kg	137	2	165	2	302	2nd place, silver medalist(s)
Deni	Men's −67 kg	135	10	166	9	301	9
Rahmat Erwin Abdullah	Men's −73 kg	152	6	190	2	342	3rd place, bronze medalist(s)
Windy Cantika Aisah	Women's −49 kg	84	4	110	3	194	3rd place, bronze medalist(s)
Nurul Akmal	Women's +87 kg	115	5	141	5	256	5

== See also ==
- Indonesia at the Olympics
- Indonesia at the Paralympics
- Indonesia at the 2020 Summer Paralympics
