= Malaysia at the 2020 Summer Olympics =

- IOC code: MAS
- NOC: Olympic Council of Malaysia
- Website: www.olympic.org.my (in English)

in Tokyo, Japan July 23, 2021 – August 8, 2021
- Competitors: 30 in 10 sports
- Flag bearers (opening): Lee Zii Jia; Goh Liu Ying
- Flag bearer (closing): Pandelela Rinong
- Medals Ranked 74th: Gold 0 Silver 1 Bronze 1 Total 2

Summer Olympics appearances (overview)
- 1956; 1960; 1964; 1968; 1972; 1976; 1980; 1984; 1988; 1992; 1996; 2000; 2004; 2008; 2012; 2016; 2020; 2024

Other related appearances
- North Borneo (1956)

Malaysia competed at the 2020 Summer Olympics in Tokyo. Originally scheduled to take place from 24 July to 9 August 2020, the Games were postponed to 23 July to 8 August 2021, due to the COVID-19 pandemic. Since the nation's official debut in 1956 under the name Malaya, Malaysian athletes have appeared in every edition of the Summer Olympic Games, except for Moscow 1980 in Moscow because of the United States-led boycott.

== Medalists ==
Medal	Name	Sport	Event	Date
Silver	Azizulhasni Awang	Cycling	Men's keirin	8 August
Bronze	Aaron Chia; Soh Wooi Yik	Badminton	Men's doubles	31 July

== Background ==
=== Administration and preparation ===
Malaysian former badminton player and three times Olympic Silver medalist, Datuk Lee Chong Wei was appointed on 15 June 2019 as chef de mission of the Malaysian delegation to the Games by Olympic Council of Malaysia (OCM) president Tan Sri Dato' Sri Mohamad Norza Zakaria. However, he chose to skip the event due to his health concerns. He retained his role, albeit serving it virtually. Meanwhile, the national delegation in Tokyo is managed by OCM secretary-general Datuk Mohd Nazifuddin Najib, who is also the deputy chef-de-mission.

As with two previous Olympic cycles, Yonex-Sunrise provides the official kit for Team Malaysia, after it decided to extend its partnership with OCM until end of 2024.

=== Opening and closing ceremonies ===
For the opening ceremony, archer Khairul Anuar Mohamad and shuttler Goh Liu Ying were selected to carry the Malaysian flag in the opening ceremony. However, Khairul requested to be dropped as one of the flagbearers, as he had to focus for the archery competition a day after the ceremony. Shuttler Lee Zii Jia was announced to be Khairul's replacement. In the Parade of Nations, the Malaysian delegation was represented by five officials and eight athletes. Both the athletes and the officials participated in the parade wore the Malay legendary warrior Hang Tuah inspired attire designed by the Art and Design Faculty of Universiti Teknologi MARA (UiTM) in Shah Alam (Main Campus). The attire featured chevron geometric pattern in the colours of the national flag, which reflects the clear mission of the Malaysian team to achieve the country's medal target. The female athletes wore the baju kurung complete with a dokoh (tiered pendant) and selendang (shawl), while the male athletes and officials wore the traditional Baju Melayu complete with the Tengkolok (headgear).

Diver Pandelela Rinong was named as flagbearer for the closing ceremony.

=== Target and achievement ===
On 19 July 2021, Youth and Sports Minister Datuk Seri Reezal Merican Naina Merican announced that the Malaysian delegation to the 2020 Summer Olympics had a target to win three medals, including a gold medal, with badminton, track cycling and diving being the main contenders of achieving the target.

However, the Malaysian delegation missed the target at the Games, having only won one silver medal through track cyclist Azizulhasni Awang in the Men's keirin event and one bronze medal through Men's doubles shuttlers Aaron Chia and Soh Wooi Yik. The result equalled the country's second-best achievement at the 1996 Summer Olympics in Atlanta, United States and the 2012 Summer Olympics in London, United Kingdom.

=== Broadcasters ===
Name	Type	Ref
Astro	Pay and over-the-top	
RTM	Free-to-air and over-the-top	
Unifi TV	Pay and over-the top	

== Competitors ==
Malaysia managed to qualify 30 athletes competing in 10 sports for the 2020 Summer Olympics, with 13 of them being first time competitors. For the first time, the women (18 athletes or 60%) outnumbered the men (12 athletes/40%) on the Malaysian team competing at these Games.

The following is the list of number of competitors in the Games.

Sport	Men	Women	Total
Archery	1	1	2
Athletics	1	1	2
Badminton	4	4	8
Cycling	2	0	2
Diving	0	5	5
Golf	1	1	2
Gymnastics	1	1	2
Sailing	1	3	4
Shooting	0	1	1
Swimming	1	1	2
Total	12	18	30

== Archery ==
Two Malaysian archers Khairul Anuar Mohamad and Syaqiera Mashayikh qualified for the men's and women's individual and automatically to the mixed event, the men's individual recurve reached the quarterfinal stage and obtained one of the four available spots at the 2019 World Archery Championships in 's-Hertogenbosch, Netherlands. The women's individual recurve obtain a quota place assigned by world ranking.

Malaysia was absent from the men's archery team event for the first time since the 2008 Games, after failing to secure one of the last three spots to the Games offered in the 2021 Archery Final Olympic Qualification Tournament (FQT) in Paris, France, leaving Khairul as the nation's sole male representative. Khairul ended the ranking round of the men's individual recurve event in 20th spot, shooting 72 arrows to collect 661 points. He then proceeded to the elimination stage and won through the one-arrow shoot-off in the first and second round against Finland's Antti Vikstrom and China's Wang Dapeng respectively, only to be eliminated in the round of 16 after losing to South Korea's opponent Kim Woojin 0–6.

Syaqiera became the third Malaysian woman archer to feature in the Olympics after Mon Redee Sut Txi in Athens 2004 and Nurul Syafiqah Hashim in London 2012. She was the first Malaysian athlete to take an action at the Games. In the ranking round, she ended the competition in 43rd spot out of 64 archers with 630 points to improve on her previous record of 619 points which she achieved at the final Olympic qualifier in Paris. Syaqiera was eliminated in the first round (Round of 64) after her 4–6 defeat against Russian Olympic Committee's (ROC) competitor and eventual silver medalist, Elena Osipova.

The Malaysian duo failed to advance to the first round of the mixed team event, after scoring a combined total of 1,291 points in the ranking round, which placed them as the 19th best pair among 29 competing teams.

Athlete	Event	Ranking round		Round of 64	Round of 32	Round of 16	Quarterfinals	Semifinals	Final / BM	
Athlete	Event	Score	Seed	Opposition Score	Opposition Score	Opposition Score	Opposition Score	Opposition Score	Opposition Score	Rank
Khairul Anuar Mohamad	Men's individual	661	20	Vikström (FIN); W 6–5	Wang Dp (CHN); W 6–5	Kim W-j (KOR); L 0–6	Did not advance			
Syaqiera Mashayikh	Women's individual	630	43	Osipova (ROC); L 4–6	Did not advance					
Khairul Anuar Mohamad; Syaqiera Mashayikh	Mixed team	1291	19	—N/a		Did not advance				

== Athletics ==
Malaysian athletes further achieved the entry standards, either by qualifying time or by world ranking, in the following track and field events (up to a maximum of 3 athletes in each event):.

Key

- Note–Ranks given for track events are within the athlete's heat only
- Q = Qualified for the next round
- q = Qualified for the next round as a fastest loser or, in field events, by position without achieving the qualifying target
- NR = National record
- N/A = Round not applicable for the event
- Bye = Athlete not required to compete in round
- NM = No mark

Track & road events

Athlete	Event	Heat		Quarterfinal		Semifinal		Final	
Athlete	Event	Result	Rank	Result	Rank	Result	Rank	Result	Rank
Azreen Nabila Alias	Women's 100 m	11.77	2 Q	11.91	7	Did not advance			

Field events

Athlete	Event	Qualification		Final	
Athlete	Event	Distance	Position	Distance	Position
Lee Hup Wei	Men's high jump	NM	—	Did not advance	

== Badminton ==
Malaysia qualified a total of eight badminton players (four per gender) for the following events based on the BWF Race to Tokyo Rankings: one entry each in the men's and women's singles; and a pair each in the men's, women's, and mixed doubles.

Men

Athlete	Event	Group stage				Elimination	Quarterfinal	Semifinal	Final / BM	
Athlete	Event	Opposition Score	Opposition Score	Opposition Score	Rank	Opposition Score	Opposition Score	Opposition Score	Opposition Score	Rank
Lee Zii Jia	Singles	Pochtarov (UKR); W (21–5, 21–11)	Leverdez (FRA); W (21–17, 21–5)	—N/a	1 Q	Chen L (CHN); L (21–8, 19–21, 5–21)	Did not advance			
Aaron Chia; Soh Wooi Yik	Doubles	Choi S-g / Seo S-j (KOR); W (24–22, 21–15)	Ahsan / Setiawan (INA); L (16–21, 19–21)	Ho-Shue / Yakura (CAN); W (21–15, 21–13)	2 Q	—N/a	Gideon / Sukamuljo (INA); W (21–14, 21–17)	Li JH / Liu YC (CHN); L (22–24, 13–21)	Ahsan / Setiawan (INA); W (17–21, 21–17, 21–14)	3rd place, bronze medalist(s)

Women

Athlete	Event	Group Stage				Elimination	Quarterfinal	Semifinal	Final / BM	
Athlete	Event	Opposition Score	Opposition Score	Opposition Score	Rank	Opposition Score	Opposition Score	Opposition Score	Opposition Score	Rank
Soniia Cheah Su Ya	Singles	Sárosi (HUN); W WO	Intanon (THA); L (21–19, 18–21, 10–21)	—N/a	2	Did not advance				
Chow Mei Kuan; Lee Meng Yean	Doubles	Polii / Rahayu (INA); L (14–21, 17–21)	Fukushima / Hirota (JPN); L (21–17, 15–21, 8–21)	Birch / Smith (GBR); W (21–19, 21–16)	3	—N/a	Did not advance			

Mixed

Athlete	Event	Group Stage				Quarterfinal	Semifinal	Final / BM	
Athlete	Event	Opposition Score	Opposition Score	Opposition Score	Rank	Opposition Score	Opposition Score	Opposition Score	Rank
Chan Peng Soon; Goh Liu Ying	Doubles	Tang C M / Tse Y S (HKG); L (18–21, 21–10, 16–21)	Lamsfuß / Herttrich (GER); L (12–21, 15–21)	Wang YL / Huang DP (CHN); L (13–21, 19–21)	4	Did not advance			

== Cycling ==
=== Track ===
Following the completion of the 2020 UCI Track Cycling World Championships, Malaysia entered one rider to compete in the men's sprint and keirin based on his final individual UCI Olympic rankings.

Sprint

Athlete	Event	Qualification		Round 1	Repechage 1	Round 2	Repechage 2	Round 3	Repechage 3	Quarterfinals	Semifinals	Final	
Athlete	Event	Time Speed (km/h)	Rank	Opposition Time Speed (km/h)	Opposition Time Speed (km/h)	Opposition Time Speed (km/h)	Opposition Time Speed (km/h)	Opposition Time Speed (km/h)	Opposition Time Speed (km/h)	Opposition Time Speed (km/h)	Opposition Time Speed (km/h)	Opposition Time Speed (km/h)	Rank
Azizulhasni Awang	Men's sprint	9.626; 74.797	17 Q	Kenny (GBR); L	Mitchell (NZL); Quintero (COL); W 10.056; 71.599	Paul (TTO); L	Wammes (CAN); W 10.131; 71.069	Hoogland (NED); L	Wakimoto (JPN); Kenny (GBR); L	Did not advance			
Shah Firdaus Sahrom	Men's sprint	9.700; 74.227	23 Q	Lavreysen (NED); L	Rudyk (POL); Barrette (CAN); W 9.667; 74.480	Carlin (GBR); L	Rajkowski (POL); W 10.317; 69.788	Lavreysen (NED); L	Vigier (FRA); Webster (NZL); L	Did not advance			

Keirin

Athlete	Event	1st Round	Repechage	Quarterfinals	Semifinals	Final
Athlete	Event	Rank	Rank	Rank	Rank	Rank
Azizulhasni Awang	Men's keirin	1 Q	Bye	2 Q	1 Q	2nd place, silver medalist(s)
Shah Firdaus Sahrom	Men's keirin	DNF R	2 Q	6	Did not advance	

== Diving ==
Four Malaysian divers, all female, qualified for the following individual spots and synchronized teams at the Games through the 2019 FINA World Championships and 2019 Asian Cup. Additionally, Cheong Jun Hoong qualified to the Olympics after finishing eighteenth in the semifinal round of the women's platform in the 2021 FINA Diving World Cup thereby adding the country's number of divers to five. This was the first time that Malaysia did not have male representatives in diving since its debut at the 2000 Games in Sydney, Australia, as none of its male divers at least qualified through the World Cup. The national team would eventually return to the men's event for the 2024 edition in Paris.

Three of the five divers reached the final, including London 2012 bronze medalist and Rio 2016 Silver medalist Pandelela Rinong. For the first time since the London 2012 Summer Olympics, none of the divers secure a medal for the country, including Nur Dhabitah Sabri who narrowly missed the podium finish in the Women's 3 m springboard finals.

Athlete	Event	Preliminary		Semifinal		Final	
Athlete	Event	Points	Rank	Points	Rank	Points	Rank
Nur Dhabitah Sabri	Women's 3 m springboard	291.60	10 Q	312.60	6 Q	326.15	4
Ng Yan Yee	Women's 3 m springboard	251.95	20	Did not advance			
Cheong Jun Hoong	Women's 10 m platform	251.80	26	Did not advance			
Pandelela Rinong	Women's 10 m platform	284.90	18 Q	315.75	7 Q	245.85	12
Leong Mun Yee; Pandelela Rinong	Women's 10 m synchronized platform	—N/a				277.98	8

== Golf ==
Malaysia entered one male and one female golfer into the Olympic tournament. Rio 2016 Olympian Gavin Green (world no. 286) qualified directly among the top 60 eligible players for the men's event based on the IGF World Rankings of 20 June 2021 while Kelly Tan (world no.154) also qualified directly on 29 June 2021.

Athlete	Event	Round 1	Round 2	Round 3	Round 4	Total		
Athlete	Event	Score	Score	Score	Score	Score	Par	Rank
Gavin Green	Men's	74	72	70	72	288	+4	=57
Kelly Tan	Women's	73	73	72	64	282	−2	=34

== Gymnastics ==
=== Artistic ===
Malaysia entered two artistic gymnasts into the Olympic competition for the first time since 2004. Farah Ann Abdul Hadi booked a spot in the women's individual all-around and apparatus events, by finishing sixteenth out of the twenty gymnasts eligible for qualification at the 2019 World Championships in Stuttgart, Germany. With the cancellation of the 2021 Asian Championships in Hangzhou, China, Jeremiah Loo Phay Xing secured the last of two available places in the men's individual all-around, as the next highest-ranked gymnast vying for qualification from the Asian zone at the 2019 World Artistic Gymnastics Championships in Stuttgart, Germany.

Men

Athlete	Event	Qualification								Final							
Athlete	Event	Apparatus						Total	Rank	Apparatus						Total	Rank
Athlete	Event	F	PH	R	V	PB	HB	Total	Rank	F	PH	R	V	PB	HB	Total	Rank
Loo Phay Xing	All-around	13.100	12.266	7.700	12.466	10.200	11.766	67.498	62	Did not advance							

Women

Athlete	Event	Qualification						Final					
Athlete	Event	Apparatus				Total	Rank	Apparatus				Total	Rank
Athlete	Event	V	UB	BB	F	Total	Rank	V	UB	BB	F	Total	Rank
Farah Ann Abdul Hadi	All-around	13.166	11.600	11.566	12.233	48.565	68	Did not advance					

== Sailing ==
Malaysian sailors qualified one boat in each of the following classes through the fleet-associated Worlds, the 2018 Asian Games, and the continental regattas.

Athlete	Event	Race											Net points	Final rank
Athlete	Event	1	2	3	4	5	6	7	8	9	10	M*	Net points	Final rank
Khairulnizam Afendy	Men's Laser	26	14	28	~~29~~	18	13	26	28	23	20	EL	196	28
Nur Shazrin Mohd Latif	Women's Laser Radial	3	25	33	14	30	~~34~~	28	30	16	15	EL	194	26
Nuraisyah Jamil; Juni Karimah Noor Jamali	Women's 470	16	18	17	20	19	20	20	~~DNF~~	17	11	EL	158	19

M = Medal race; EL = Eliminated – did not advance into the medal race

== Shooting ==
Malaysia granted an invitation from ISSF to send London 2012 Olympian Nur Suryani Mohd Taibi in women's rifle shooting to the Olympics, as long as the minimum qualifying score (MQS) was fulfilled by June 6, 2021. Nur Suryani competing in the women's 50 m rifle 3 positions failed to advance to that event's final. She scored 1142 in the qualification round, placing her as the 34th best shooter among 37 competitors.

Athlete	Event	Qualification		Final	
Athlete	Event	Points	Rank	Points	Rank
Nur Suryani Mohd Taibi	Women's 50 m rifle 3 positions	1142	34	Did not advance	

== Swimming ==
Malaysia received a universality invitation from FINA to send two top-ranked swimmers (one per gender) in their respective individual events to the Olympics, based on the FINA Points System of June 28, 2021.

Rio 2016 Olympians Welson Sim and Phee Jinq En failed to advance to the next round of their respective events. However, Phee smashed a Malaysian record of 1:08.40 in the women's 100 m breaststroke, eclipsing a tenth of a second in her record time that she set from the 2019 SEA Games.

Athlete	Event	Heat		Semifinal		Final	
Athlete	Event	Time	Rank	Time	Rank	Time	Rank
Welson Sim	Men's 200 m freestyle	1:49.24	32	Did not advance			
Welson Sim	Men's 400 m freestyle	3:58.25	33	—N/a		Did not advance	
Phee Jinq En	Women's 100 m breaststroke	1:08.40 NR	29	Did not advance			
Phee Jinq En	Women's 200 m breaststroke	2:32.57	31	Did not advance			

== See also ==
- Malaysia at the 2020 Summer Paralympics
- Malaysia at the Olympics
