= Badminton at the 2020 Summer Olympics – Mixed doubles =

Olympic badminton event

Mixed doubles at the Games of the XXXII Olympiad
- Venue: Musashino Forest Sport Plaza
- Date: 24–30 July 2021
- Competitors: 32 (16 pairs) from 15 nations

Medalists
1st place, gold medalist(s)		Wang Yilyu; Huang Dongping	China
2nd place, silver medalist(s)		Zheng Siwei; Huang Yaqiong	China
3rd place, bronze medalist(s)		Yuta Watanabe; Arisa Higashino	Japan

The mixed doubles badminton tournament at the 2020 Summer Olympics took place from 24 to 30 July at the Musashino Forest Sport Plaza at Tokyo. There were 16 pairs (32 players) from 15 nations competing.

China's Wang Yilyu and Huang Dongping defeated compatriots Zheng Siwei and Huang Yaqiong in the final, 21–17, 17–21, 21–19 to win the gold medal in mixed doubles badminton at the 2020 Summer Olympics. The final featured two Chinese mixed doubles teams for the first time since 2012. In the bronze-medal match, Japan's Yuta Watanabe and Arisa Higashino defeated Tang Chun Man and Tse Ying Suet of Hong Kong 21–17, 23–21. This marked Japan's first Olympic medal in mixed doubles, and made Watanabe the first Japanese male player to win an Olympic badminton medal.

== Background ==
This was the 7th appearance of the event as a full medal event. Badminton was introduced as a demonstration sport in 1972, held again as an exhibition sport in 1988, and added to the full programme in 1992; the mixed doubles tournament was not held in 1992 but has been held since 1996.

The reigning champions were Tontowi Ahmad and Liliyana Natsir of Indonesia, who were not defending their title with both having retired. The top two qualifying pairs were both from China (the only nation to qualify two pairs): Zheng Siwei/Huang Yaqiong and Wang Yilyu/Huang Dongping. Zheng and Huang were also the reigning world champions.

== Qualification ==
The badminton qualification system provided for 16 mixed doubles teams (32 players). Following revisions due to the COVID-19 pandemic, the qualifying periods were set between 29 April 2019 to 15 March 2020 and 4 January to 13 June 2021, with the ranking list of 15 June 2021 deciding qualification.

Qualification was done entirely through the ranking list. Nations with at least two pairs in the top 8 were able to send a maximum of 2 pairs (4 players); all other nations were limited to a single pair. Pairs were taken from the ranking list in order, respecting those national limits, until 16 pairs were selected. However, each continent was guaranteed to have at least one pair with the lowest-ranking pairs displaced if necessary to make room for a continental guarantee.

== Competition format ==
The tournament started with a group phase round-robin. There were four groups of four teams each; the top two highest-ranked pairs from each group would move on to a knockout stage. The knockout stage was a three-round single-elimination tournament with a bronze-medal match.

Matches were played best-of-three games. Each game was played to 21, except that a pair must win by 2 unless the score reached 30–29.

== Seeds ==
1. Zheng Siwei / Huang Yaqiong (CHN) (silver medalists)
2. Wang Yilyu / Huang Dongping (CHN) (gold medalists)
3. Dechapol Puavaranukroh / Sapsiree Taerattanachai (THA) (quarter-finals)
4. Praveen Jordan / Melati Daeva Oktavianti (INA) (quarter-finals)

== Schedule ==
The tournament was held over a 7-day period, with 6 competition days and 1 open day.

Legend

P	Preliminaries	QF	Quarter-finals	SF	Semi-finals	BM	Bronze medal match	GM	Gold medal match

Date	24 Jul		25 Jul		26 Jul		27 Jul		28 Jul		29 Jul		30 Jul		31 Jul		1 Aug		2 Aug	
Event	M	E	M	E	M	E	M	E	M	E	M	E	M	A	M	E	A	E	A	E
Mixed doubles	P								QF		SF		BM	GM						

== Group stage ==
=== Group A ===
Pos	Team	Pld	W	L	GF	GA	GD	PF	PA	PD	Pts	Qualification
1	Zheng Siwei (CHN) Huang Yaqiong (CHN)	3	3	0	6	0	+6	127	81	+46	3	Advance to quarter-finals
2	Seo Seung-jae (KOR) Chae Yoo-jung (KOR)	3	2	1	4	3	+1	131	99	+32	2	Advance to quarter-finals
3	Robin Tabeling (NED) Selena Piek (NED)	3	1	2	3	4	−1	124	114	+10	1	
4	Adham Hatem Elgamal (EGY) Doha Hany (EGY)	3	0	3	0	6	−6	38	126	−88	0	

Source: TOCOG

Date	Time	Pair 1	Score	Pair 2	Set 1	Set 2	Set 3
24 July	10:20	Zheng Siwei (China); Huang Yaqiong (China)	2–0 (Note: Archived 24 July 2021 at the Wayback Machine)	(Egypt) Adham Hatem Elgamal (Egypt) Doha Hany	21–5	21–10	
24 July	10:20	Seo Seung-jae (South Korea); Chae Yoo-jung (South Korea)	2–1 (Note: Archived 24 July 2021 at the Wayback Machine)	(Netherlands) Robin Tabeling (Netherlands) Selena Piek	16–21	21–15	21–11
25 July	14:00	Zheng Siwei (China); Huang Yaqiong (China)	2–0 (Note: Archived 25 July 2021 at the Wayback Machine)	(Netherlands) Robin Tabeling (Netherlands) Selena Piek	21–15	22–20	
25 July	18:00	Seo Seung-jae (South Korea); Chae Yoo-jung (South Korea)	2–0 (Note: Archived 24 July 2021 at the Wayback Machine)	(Egypt) Adham Hatem Elgamal (Egypt) Doha Hany	21–7	21–3	
26 July	10:40	Robin Tabeling (Netherlands); Selena Piek (Netherlands)	2–0 (Note: Archived 26 July 2021 at the Wayback Machine)	(Egypt) Adham Hatem Elgamal (Egypt) Doha Hany	21–9	21–4	
26 July	12:40	Zheng Siwei (China); Huang Yaqiong (China)	2–0 (Note: Archived 26 July 2021 at the Wayback Machine)	(South Korea) Seo Seung-jae (South Korea) Chae Yoo-jung	21–14	21–17	

=== Group B ===
Pos	Team	Pld	W	L	GF	GA	GD	PF	PA	PD	Pts	Qualification
1	Marcus Ellis (GBR) Lauren Smith (GBR)	3	3	0	6	0	+6	126	98	+28	3	Advance to quarter-finals
2	Dechapol Puavaranukroh (THA) Sapsiree Taerattanachai (THA)	3	2	1	4	2	+2	115	85	+30	2	Advance to quarter-finals
3	Thom Gicquel (FRA) Delphine Delrue (FRA)	3	1	2	2	4	−2	101	109	−8	1	
4	Joshua Hurlburt-Yu (CAN) Josephine Wu (CAN)	3	0	3	0	6	−6	76	126	−50	0	

Source: TOCOG

Date	Time	Pair 1	Score	Pair 2	Set 1	Set 2	Set 3
24 July	09:40	Marcus Ellis (United Kingdom); Lauren Smith (United Kingdom)	2–0 (Note: Archived 24 July 2021 at the Wayback Machine)	(France) Thom Gicquel (France) Delphine Delrue	21–18	21–17	
24 July	18:40	Dechapol Puavaranukroh (Thailand); Sapsiree Taerattanachai (Thailand)	2–0 (Note: Archived 25 July 2021 at the Wayback Machine)	(Canada) Joshua Hurlburt-Yu (Canada) Josephine Wu	21–13	21–6	
25 July	12:00	Dechapol Puavaranukroh (Thailand); Sapsiree Taerattanachai (Thailand)	2–0 (Note: Archived 28 July 2021 at the Wayback Machine)	(France) Thom Gicquel (France) Delphine Delrue	21–9	21–15	
25 July	19:20	Marcus Ellis (United Kingdom); Lauren Smith (United Kingdom)	2–0 (Note: Archived 28 July 2021 at the Wayback Machine)	(Canada) Joshua Hurlburt-Yu (Canada) Josephine Wu	21–13	21–19	
26 July	12:00	Dechapol Puavaranukroh (Thailand); Sapsiree Taerattanachai (Thailand)	0–2 (Note: Archived 26 July 2021 at the Wayback Machine)	(United Kingdom) Marcus Ellis (United Kingdom) Lauren Smith	17–21	19–21	
26 July	13:20	Thom Gicquel (France); Delphine Delrue (France)	2–0 (Note: Archived 26 July 2021 at the Wayback Machine)	(Canada) Joshua Hurlburt-Yu (Canada) Josephine Wu	21–12	21–13	

=== Group C ===
Pos	Team	Pld	W	L	GF	GA	GD	PF	PA	PD	Pts	Qualification
1	Yuta Watanabe (JPN) Arisa Higashino (JPN) (H)	3	3	0	6	1	+5	146	93	+53	3	Advance to quarter-finals
2	Praveen Jordan (INA) Melati Daeva Oktavianti (INA)	3	2	1	4	3	+1	130	135	−5	2	Advance to quarter-finals
3	Mathias Christiansen (DEN) Alexandra Bøje (DEN)	3	1	2	3	4	−1	131	127	+4	1	
4	Simon Leung (AUS) Gronya Somerville (AUS)	3	0	3	1	6	−5	94	146	−52	0	

Source: TOCOG
(H) Host

Date	Time	Pair 1	Score	Pair 2	Set 1	Set 2	Set 3
24 July	09:00	Yuta Watanabe (Japan); Arisa Higashino (Japan)	2–1 (Note: Archived 25 July 2021 at the Wayback Machine)	(Denmark) Mathias Christiansen (Denmark) Alexandra Bøje	20–22	21–11	21–15
24 July	11:40	Praveen Jordan (Indonesia); Melati Daeva Oktavianti (Indonesia)	2–1 (Note: Archived 25 July 2021 at the Wayback Machine)	(Australia) Simon Leung (Australia) Gronya Somerville	20–22	21–17	21–13
25 July	13:20	Praveen Jordan (Indonesia); Melati Daeva Oktavianti (Indonesia)	2–0 (Note: Archived 25 July 2021 at the Wayback Machine)	(Denmark) Mathias Christiansen (Denmark) Alexandra Bøje	24–22	21–19	
25 July	18:40	Yuta Watanabe (Japan); Arisa Higashino (Japan)	2–0 (Note: Archived 24 July 2021 at the Wayback Machine)	(Australia) Simon Leung (Australia) Gronya Somerville	21–7	21–15	
26 July	10:40	Praveen Jordan (Indonesia); Melati Daeva Oktavianti (Indonesia)	0–2 (Note: Archived 26 July 2021 at the Wayback Machine)	(Japan) Yuta Watanabe (Japan) Arisa Higashino	13–21	10–21	
26 July	13:20	Mathias Christiansen (Denmark); Alexandra Bøje (Denmark)	2–0 (Note: Archived 26 July 2021 at the Wayback Machine)	(Australia) Simon Leung (Australia) Gronya Somerville	21–6	21–14	

=== Group D ===
Pos	Team	Pld	W	L	GF	GA	GD	PF	PA	PD	Pts	Qualification
1	Wang Yilyu (CHN) Huang Dongping (CHN)	3	3	0	6	0	+6	129	101	+28	3	Advance to quarter-finals
2	Tang Chun Man (HKG) Tse Ying Suet (HKG)	3	2	1	4	4	0	145	155	−10	2	Advance to quarter-finals
3	Mark Lamsfuß (GER) Isabel Herttrich (GER)	3	1	2	3	4	−1	139	135	+4	1	
4	Chan Peng Soon (MAS) Goh Liu Ying (MAS)	3	0	3	1	6	−5	114	136	−22	0	

Source: TOCOG

Date	Time	Pair 1	Score	Pair 2	Set 1	Set 2	Set 3
24 July	12:20	Wang Yilyu (China); Huang Dongping (China)	2–0 (Note: Archived 25 July 2021 at the Wayback Machine)	(Germany) Mark Lamsfuß (Germany) Isabel Herttrich	24–22	21–17	
24 July	19:20	Chan Peng Soon (Malaysia); Goh Liu Ying (Malaysia)	1–2 (Note: Archived 26 July 2021 at the Wayback Machine)	(Hong Kong) Tang Chun Man (Hong Kong) Tse Ying Suet	18–21	21–10	16–21
25 July	11:20	Chan Peng Soon (Malaysia); Goh Liu Ying (Malaysia)	0–2 (Note: Archived 25 July 2021 at the Wayback Machine)	(Germany) Mark Lamsfuß (Germany) Isabel Herttrich	12–21	15–21	
25 July	12:00	Wang Yilyu (China); Huang Dongping (China)	2–0 (Note: Archived 25 July 2021 at the Wayback Machine)	(Hong Kong) Tang Chun Man (Hong Kong) Tse Ying Suet	21–12	21–18	
26 July	12:00	Tang Chun Man (Hong Kong); Tse Ying Suet (Hong Kong)	2–1 (Note: Archived 26 July 2021 at the Wayback Machine)	(Germany) Mark Lamsfuß (Germany) Isabel Herttrich	22–20	20–22	21–16
26 July	18:40	Wang Yilyu (China); Huang Dongping (China)	2–0 (Note: Archived 26 July 2021 at the Wayback Machine)	(Malaysia) Chan Peng Soon (Malaysia) Goh Liu Ying	21–13	21–19	

== Finals ==
The quarter-finals are held on 28 July, the semi-finals on 29 July, and the medal matches on 30 July 2021.

Quarter-finals
A1	Zheng Siwei (CHN); Huang Yaqiong (CHN)	21	21
C2	Praveen Jordan (INA); Melati Daeva Oktavianti (INA)	17	15
B1	Marcus Ellis (GBR); Lauren Smith (GBR)	13	18
D2	Tang Chun Man (HKG); Tse Ying Suet (HKG)	21	21
C1	Yuta Watanabe (JPN); Arisa Higashino (JPN)	15	21	21
B2	Dechapol Puavaranukroh (THA); Sapsiree Taerattanachai (THA)	21	16	14
A2	Seo Seung-jae (KOR); Chae Yoo-jung (KOR)	9	16
D1	Wang Yilyu (CHN); Huang Dongping (CHN)	21	21

Semi-finals
A1	Zheng Siwei (CHN); Huang Yaqiong (CHN)	21	21
D2	Tang Chun Man (HKG); Tse Ying Suet (HKG)	16	12
C1	Yuta Watanabe (JPN); Arisa Higashino (JPN)	23	15	14
D1	Wang Yilyu (CHN); Huang Dongping (CHN)	21	21	21

Gold medal match
A1	Zheng Siwei (CHN); Huang Yaqiong (CHN)	17	21	19
D1	Wang Yilyu (CHN); Huang Dongping (CHN)	21	17	21
Bronze medal match
D2	Tang Chun Man (HKG); Tse Ying Suet (HKG)	17	21
C1	Yuta Watanabe (JPN); Arisa Higashino (JPN)	21	23
