= Lee Yang =

Taiwanese badminton player (born 1995)

- 李洋
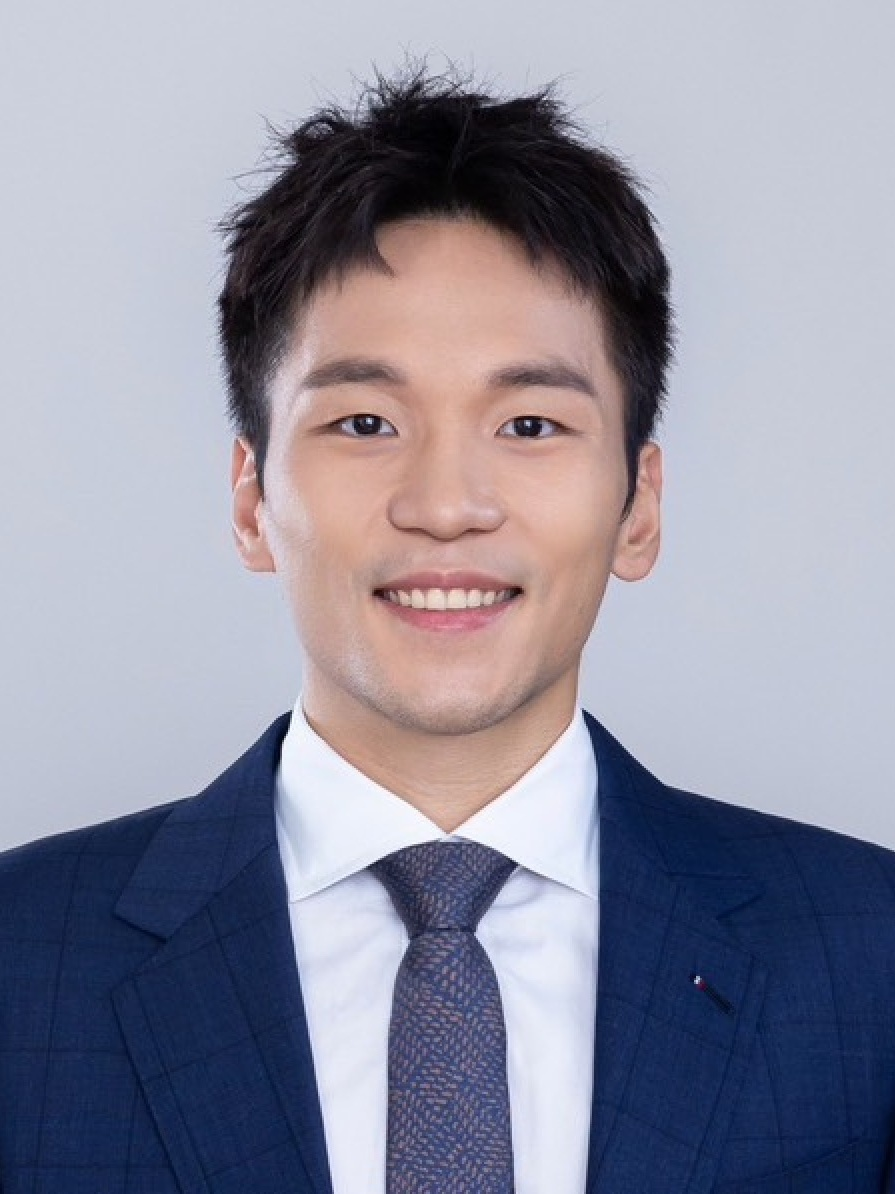
- Official portrait, 2025

1st Minister of Sports
- Incumbent
- Assumed office 9 September 2025
- President: Lai Ching-te
- Premier: Cho Jung-tai
- Preceded by: James Cheng

Personal details
- Born: 12 August 1995 (age 31) Taipei, Taiwan
- Party: Independent
- Sports career
- Years active: 2015–2024
- Height: 1.78 m (5 ft 10 in)
- Country: Taiwan (ROC)
- Sport: Badminton
- Handedness: Right
- Retired: 9 September 2024

Men's & mixed doubles
- Highest ranking: 7 (MD with Lee Jhe-huei, 6 July 2017); 2 (MD with Wang Chi-lin, 27 September 2022); 27 (XD with Hsu Ya-ching, 2 November 2017)
- BWF profile
Medal record
Men's badminton
Representing Chinese Taipei
Olympic Games
Gold medal – first place	2020 Tokyo	Men's doubles
Gold medal – first place	2024 Paris	Men's doubles
Thomas Cup
Bronze medal – third place	2024 Chengdu	Men's team
Asian Games
Bronze medal – third place	2018 Jakarta–Palembang	Men's doubles
Bronze medal – third place	2018 Jakarta–Palembang	Men's team
Bronze medal – third place	2022 Hangzhou	Men's doubles
Asian Championships
Bronze medal – third place	2023 Dubai	Men's doubles
Summer Universiade
Gold medal – first place	2017 Taipei	Mixed team
Bronze medal – third place	2017 Taipei	Men's doubles
Bronze medal – third place	2017 Taipei	Mixed doubles

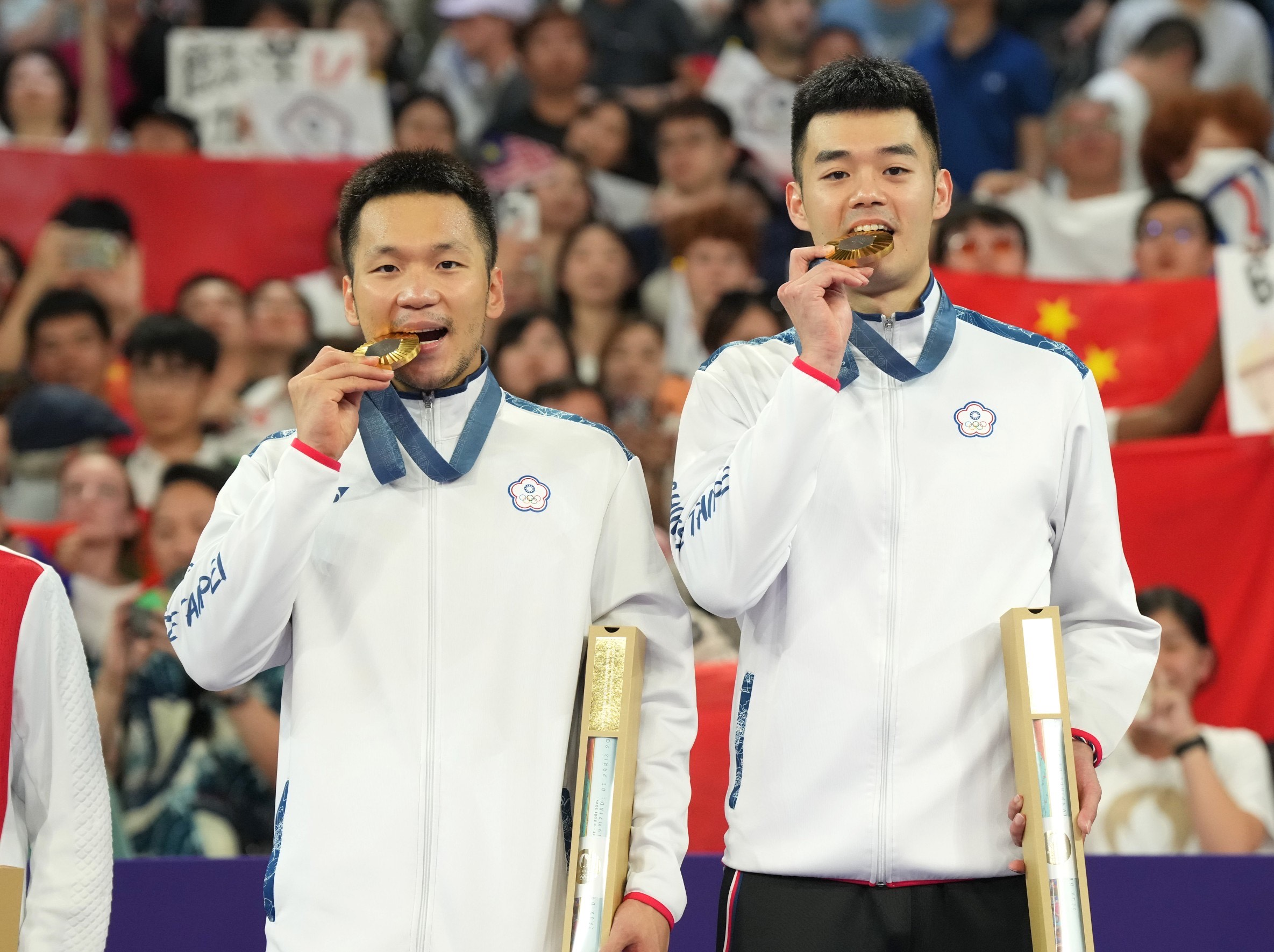
Lee (left) pictured with Wang Chi-lin during the 2024 Paris Olympics.

Lee Yang (Chinese: 李洋; pinyin: Lǐ Yáng; born 12 August 1995) is a Taiwanese politician and former professional badminton player. He is the Olympic men's doubles champion in 2020 and 2024, becoming the first unseeded men's doubles pair in Olympics history to win consecutive gold medals. Lee also won the bronze medals at the 2018 and 2022 Asian Games, as well at the 2023 Asian Championships. With his former partner Wang Chi-lin, they reached a career high as World number 2 in September 2022.

== Life and career ==
Lee was born in Taipei in 1995, his paternal line was originated from Kinmen and has his household registration located in Jinning, Kinmen. He was educated and raised in Taipei and has started his career in badminton in fifth grade. Lee played in the men's doubles with Lee Jhe-huei. They were champions in 2016 at the Vietnam Open Grand Prix. In 2015, together they entered the 2015 Chinese Taipei Masters Grand Prix, 2015 Vietnam Open Grand Prix, and 2015 Korea Masters Grand Prix Gold. In 2016 they entered the 2016 Chinese Taipei Open Grand Prix Gold, 2016 Thailand Open Grand Prix Gold and 2016 Dutch Open Grand Prix. He won the men's doubles title at the 2017 French Open. In 2018, he competed at the Asian Games and won bronze medals in the men's doubles and team events.

Lee made a new partnership with Wang Chi-lin in the end of 2018. Wang and Lee are class mates from junior high school. The duo reached six finals in the 2019 BWF World Tour, managed to win the Spain Masters, Orléans Masters, India Open, and Korea Masters.

In 2021, at the 2020 Tokyo Olympics, he partnered with Wang Chi-lin to defeat the 2018 World Champion pairing of Li Junhui and Liu Yuchen in the final. They became the first unseeded pair to win an Olympic gold in the men's doubles event and the first to win a gold in badminton for Chinese Taipei.

In 2024, at the 2024 Paris Olympics, he and his partner Wang Chi-lin repeated the feat to win in the men's doubles finals as an unseeded pair, making history to become the first men's doubles pair in history to defend their Olympic title. Lai Ching-te, the current President of Taiwan, congratulated Lee and Wang on their victory by referring to the pair as "the country's glory".

After appearing in the 2024 Taipei Open, Lee retired from professional badminton to become a lecturer at the National Taiwan Sport University. A farewell ceremony for Lee was held after the Taipei Open tournament on 9 September 2024, with his last professional tournament being the 2024 BWF World Tour Finals in December.

== Political career ==
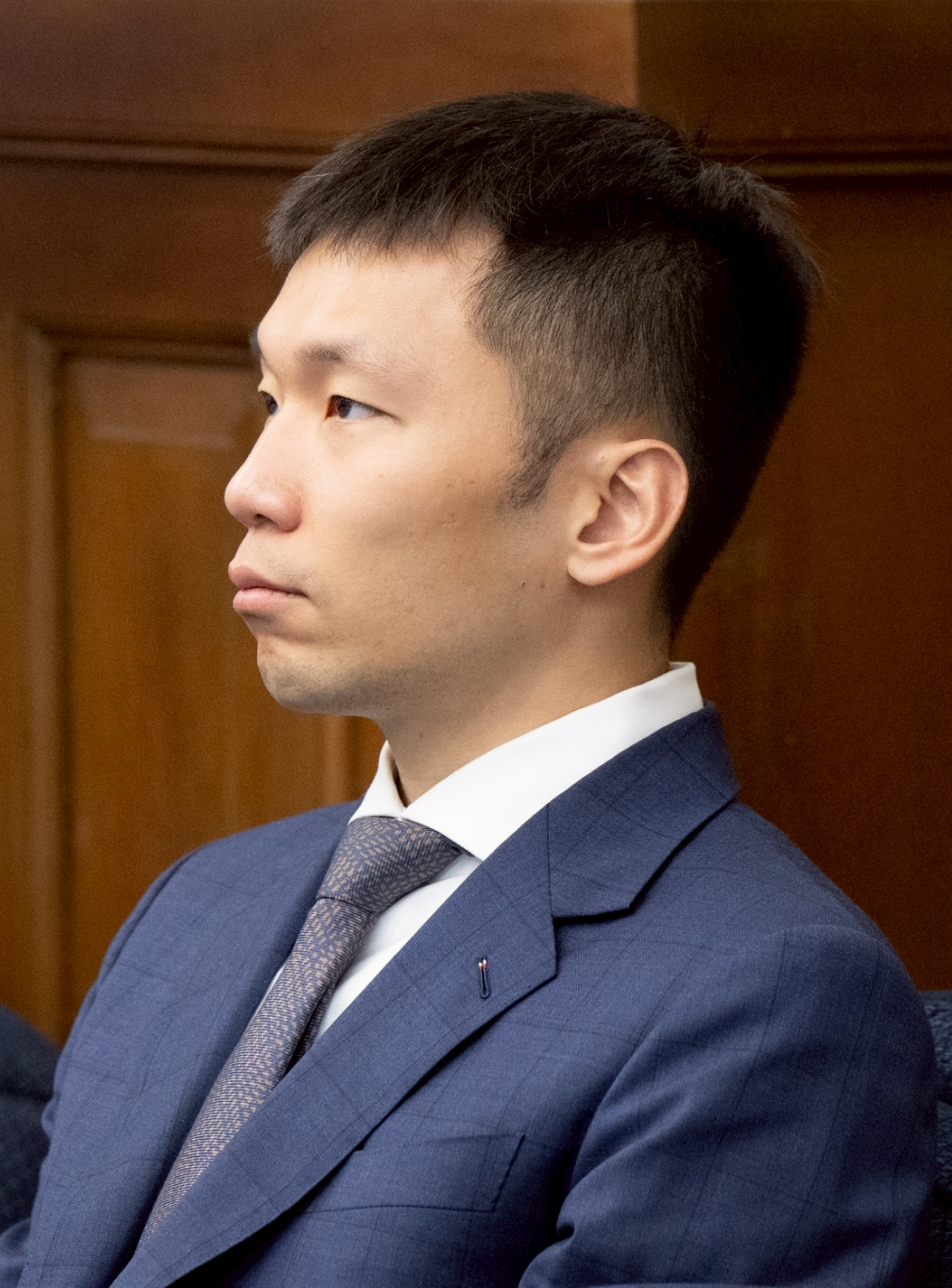
Lee in 2026

The Ministry of Sports was established as a cabinet-level ministry of the government of the Republic of China on 9 September 2025, with Lee as its inaugural minister and the youngest government minister in Taiwanese history.

== Achievements ==
=== Olympic Games ===
Men's doubles
Year	Venue	Partner	Opponent	Score	Result
2020	Musashino Forest Sport Plaza, Tokyo, Japan	(Chinese Taipei) Wang Chi-lin	(China) Li Junhui (China) Liu Yuchen	21–18, 21–12	Gold
2024	Porte de La Chapelle Arena, Paris, France	(Chinese Taipei) Wang Chi-lin	(China) Liang Weikeng (China) Wang Chang	21–17, 18–21, 21–19	Gold

=== Asian Games ===
Men's doubles
Year	Venue	Partner	Opponent	Score	Result
2018	Istora Gelora Bung Karno; Jakarta, Indonesia	(Chinese Taipei) Lee Jhe-huei	(Indonesia) Marcus Fernaldi Gideon (Indonesia) Kevin Sanjaya Sukamuljo	15–21, 22–20, 12–21	Bronze
2022	Binjiang Gymnasium; Hangzhou, China	(Chinese Taipei) Wang Chi-lin	(South Korea) Choi Sol-gyu (South Korea) Kim Won-ho	12–21, 10–21	Bronze

=== Asian Championships ===
Men's doubles
Year	Venue	Partner	Opponent	Score	Result
2023	Sheikh Rashid Bin Hamdan Indoor Hall; Dubai, United Arab Emirates	(Chinese Taipei) Wang Chi-lin	(India) Satwiksairaj Rankireddy (India) Chirag Shetty	18–21, 14–13 retired	Bronze

=== Summer Universiade ===
Men's doubles
Year	Venue	Partner	Opponent	Score	Result
2017	Taipei Gymnasium; Taipei, Taiwan	(Chinese Taipei) Lee Jhe-huei	(Japan) Kenya Mitsuhashi (Japan) Katsuki Tamate	21–13, 14–21, 18–21	Bronze

Mixed doubles
Year	Venue	Partner	Opponent	Score	Result
2017	Taipei Gymnasium; Taipei, Taiwan	(Chinese Taipei) Hsu Ya-ching	(Malaysia) Nur Mohd Azriyn Ayub (Malaysia) Goh Yea Ching	14–21, 16–21	Bronze

=== World University Championships ===
Men's doubles
Year	Venue	Partner	Opponent	Score	Result
2016	Sports Palace "Borisoglebskiy"; Ramenskoe, Russia	(Chinese Taipei) Lee Jhe-huei	(South Korea) Choi Sol-gyu (South Korea) Kim Jae-hwan	21–19, 14–21, 17–21	Silver

Mixed doubles
Year	Venue	Partner	Opponent	Score	Result
2016	Sports Palace "Borisoglebskiy"; Ramenskoe, Russia	(Chinese Taipei) Hsu Ya-ching	(Malaysia) Mohd Lutfi Zaim Abdul Khalid (Malaysia) Shevon Jamie Lai	21–13, 21–19	Gold

=== BWF World Tour (8 titles, 6 runners-up) ===
The BWF World Tour, which was announced on 19 March 2017 and implemented in 2018, is a series of elite badminton tournaments sanctioned by the Badminton World Federation (BWF). The BWF World Tour is divided into levels of World Tour Finals, Super 1000, Super 750, Super 500, Super 300, and the BWF Tour Super 100.

Men's doubles
Year	Tournament	Level	Partner	Opponent	Score	Result
2019	Spain Masters	Super 300	(Chinese Taipei) Wang Chi-lin	(South Korea) Kim Won-ho (South Korea) Seo Seung-jae	21–8, 23–21	(gold) Winner
2019	Swiss Open	Super 300	(Chinese Taipei) Wang Chi-lin	(Indonesia) Fajar Alfian (Indonesia) Muhammad Rian Ardianto	19–21, 16–21	(silver) Runner-up
2019	Orléans Masters	Super 100	(Chinese Taipei) Wang Chi-lin	(Japan) Akira Koga (Japan) Taichi Saito	16–21, 22–20, 21–15	(gold) Winner
2019	India Open	Super 500	(Chinese Taipei) Wang Chi-lin	(Indonesia) Angga Pratama (Indonesia) Ricky Karanda Suwardi	21–14, 21–14	(gold) Winner
2019	U.S. Open	Super 300	(Chinese Taipei) Wang Chi-lin	(South Korea) Ko Sung-hyun (South Korea) Shin Baek-cheol	13–21, 21–17, 3–6 retired	(silver) Runner-up
2019	Korea Masters	Super 300	(Chinese Taipei) Wang Chi-lin	(Malaysia) Goh V Shem (Malaysia) Tan Wee Kiong	21–19, 20–22, 21–19	(gold) Winner
2020	Spain Masters	Super 300	(Chinese Taipei) Wang Chi-lin	(Denmark) Kim Astrup (Denmark) Anders Skaarup Rasmussen	17–21, 19–21	(silver) Runner-up
2020 (I)	Thailand Open	Super 1000	(Chinese Taipei) Wang Chi-lin	(Malaysia) Goh V Shem (Malaysia) Tan Wee Kiong	21–16, 21–23, 21–19	(gold) Winner
2020 (II)	Thailand Open	Super 1000	(Chinese Taipei) Wang Chi-lin	(Malaysia) Aaron Chia (Malaysia) Soh Wooi Yik	21–13, 21–18	(gold) Winner
2020	BWF World Tour Finals	World Tour Finals	(Chinese Taipei) Wang Chi-lin	(Indonesia) Mohammad Ahsan (Indonesia) Hendra Setiawan	21–17, 23–21	(gold) Winner
2022	Taipei Open	Super 300	(Chinese Taipei) Wang Chi-lin	(Malaysia) Man Wei Chong (Malaysia) Tee Kai Wun	18–21, 21–10, 18–21	(silver) Runner-up
2023	Japan Open	Super 750	(Chinese Taipei) Wang Chi-lin	(Japan) Takuro Hoki (Japan) Yugo Kobayashi	21–19, 21–13	(gold) Winner
2023	Hylo Open	Super 300	(Chinese Taipei) Wang Chi-lin	(China) Liu Yuchen (China) Ou Xuanyi	22–24, 13–21	(silver) Runner-up
2023	Korea Masters	Super 300	(Chinese Taipei) Wang Chi-lin	(Chinese Taipei) Lee Jhe-huei (Chinese Taipei) Yang Po-hsuan	17–21, 19–21	(silver) Runner-up

=== BWF Superseries (1 title) ===
The BWF Superseries, which was launched on 14 December 2006 and implemented in 2007, was a series of elite badminton tournaments, sanctioned by the Badminton World Federation (BWF). BWF Superseries levels were Superseries and Superseries Premier. A season of Superseries consisted of twelve tournaments around the world that had been introduced since 2011. Successful players were invited to the Superseries Finals, which were held at the end of each year.

Men's doubles
Year	Tournament	Partner	Opponent	Score	Result
2017	French Open	(Chinese Taipei) Lee Jhe-huei	(Denmark) Mathias Boe (Denmark) Carsten Mogensen	21–19, 23–21	(gold) Winner

BWF Super Series Finals tournament
BWF Super Series Premier tournament
BWF Super Series tournament

=== BWF Grand Prix (3 titles, 2 runners-up) ===
The BWF Grand Prix had two levels, the Grand Prix and Grand Prix Gold. It was a series of badminton tournaments sanctioned by the Badminton World Federation (BWF) and played between 2007 and 2017.

Men's doubles
Year	Tournament	Partner	Opponent	Score	Result
2016	Vietnam Open	(Chinese Taipei) Lee Jhe-huei	(Malaysia) Koo Kien Keat (Malaysia) Tan Boon Heong	18–21, 21–14, 21–7	(gold) Winner
2016	Dutch Open	(Chinese Taipei) Lee Jhe-huei	(Denmark) Mathias Christiansen (Denmark) David Daugaard	21–17, 21–17	(gold) Winner
2016	Macau Open	(Chinese Taipei) Lee Jhe-huei	(China) Lu Kai (China) Zhang Nan	17–21, 21–18, 21–19	(gold) Winner
2016	Korea Masters	(Chinese Taipei) Lee Jhe-huei	(South Korea) Kim Jae-hwan (South Korea) Ko Sung-hyun	19–21, 18–21	(silver) Runner-up
2017	Chinese Taipei Open	(Chinese Taipei) Lee Jhe-huei	(Chinese Taipei) Chen Hung-ling (Chinese Taipei) Wang Chi-lin	16–21, 20–22	(silver) Runner-up

BWF Grand Prix Gold tournament
BWF Grand Prix tournament

=== BWF International Challenge/Series (1 runner-up) ===
Men's doubles
Year	Tournament	Partner	Opponent	Score	Result
2015	Malaysia International	(Chinese Taipei) Lee Jhe-huei	(Chinese Taipei) Lin Chia-yu (Chinese Taipei) Wu Hsiao-lin	21–17, 16–21, 18–21	(silver) Runner-up

BWF International Challenge tournament
BWF International Series tournament
BWF Future Series tournament
