= Badminton at the 2020 Summer Olympics – Women's doubles =

Olympic badminton event

Women's doubles at the Games of the XXXII Olympiad
- Venue: Musashino Forest Sport Plaza
- Date: 24 July – 2 August 2021
- Competitors: 32 (16 pairs) from 13 nations

Medalists
1st place, gold medalist(s)		Greysia Polii; Apriyani Rahayu	Indonesia
2nd place, silver medalist(s)		Chen Qingchen; Jia Yifan	China
3rd place, bronze medalist(s)		Kim So-yeong; Kong Hee-yong	South Korea

The women's doubles badminton tournament at the 2020 Summer Olympics took place from 24 July to 2 August at the Musashino Forest Sport Plaza at Tokyo. There were 16 pairs (32 players) from 14 nations competing.

Indonesia's Greysia Polii and Apriyani Rahayu defeated China's Chen Qingchen and Jia Yifan 21–19, 21–15, to win the gold medal in women's doubles badminton at the 2020 Summer Olympics. It was Indonesia's first badminton gold medal from the women's doubles discipline, and the only gold won by the contingent in the 2020 Olympics. Indonesia also became the second country to have medaled in all five disciplines of Olympic badminton, after China completed the feat at the 2012 Olympics. At the age of 33 years and 11 months, Polii subsequently became the oldest player to win an Olympic gold medal in badminton. In the bronze-medal match, South Korea's Kim So-yeong and Kong Hee-yong defeated compatriots Lee So-hee and Shin Seung-chan 21–10, 21–17. It was South Korea's second consecutive bronze medal at the event.

Japan's Misaki Matsutomo and Ayaka Takahashi were the defending Olympic champions from 2016, but Takahashi retired from international badminton in 2020, and Matsutomo chose not to participate in the event.

== Background ==
This was the 8th appearance of the event as a full medal event. Badminton was introduced as a demonstration sport in 1972 (without women's doubles), held again as an exhibition sport in 1988, and added to the full programme in 1992; the women's doubles tournament had been held since.

The reigning champions were Misaki Matsutomo and Ayaka Takahashi of Japan, who were not defending their title following Takahashi's retirement. Japan has two of the three top-ranked qualifiers, however, with Yuki Fukushima and Sayaka Hirota (#1) and Mayu Matsumoto and Wakana Nagahara (#3). Matsumoto and Nagahara were the reigning world champions, defeating Fukushima and Hirota in the final. China, which had won 5 of the previous 7 editions of the women's doubles, had the #2-ranked pair Chen Qingchen and Jia Yifan.

== Qualification ==
The badminton qualification system provided for 16 women's doubles teams (32 players). Following revisions due to the COVID-19 pandemic, the qualifying periods were 29 April 2019 to 15 March 2020 and 4 January to 13 June 2021, with the ranking list of 15 June 2021 controlling qualification.

Qualification was done entirely through the ranking list. Nations with at least two pairs in the top 8 were able to send a maximum of 2 pairs (4 players); all other nations were limited to a single pair. Pairs were taken from the ranking list in order, respecting those national limits, until 16 pairs were selected. However, each continent was guaranteed to have at least one pair with the lowest-ranking pairs displaced if necessary to make room for a continental guarantee.

== Competition format ==
The tournament started with a group phase round-robin. There were four groups of four teams each; the top two highest-ranked pairs from each group advanced to a knockout stage. The knockout stage was a three-round single-elimination tournament with a bronze medal match.

Matches were played best-of-three games. Each game was played to 21, except that a pair must win by 2 unless the score reached 30–29.

== Seeds ==
1. Yuki Fukushima / Sayaka Hirota (JPN) (quarter-finals)
2. Chen Qingchen / Jia Yifan (CHN) (silver medalists)
3. Mayu Matsumoto / Wakana Nagahara (JPN) (quarter-finals)
4. Lee So-hee / Shin Seung-chan (KOR) (fourth place)

== Schedule ==
The tournament was held over a 10-day period, with 7 competition days and 3 open days.

Legend

P	Preliminaries	QF	Quarter-finals	SF	Semi-finals	M	Medal matches

Date	24 Jul		25 Jul		26 Jul		27 Jul		28 Jul		29 Jul		30 Jul		31 Jul		1 Aug		2 Aug	
Event	M	E	M	E	M	E	M	E	M	E	M	E	M	A	M	E	A	E	A	E
Women's doubles	P											QF			SF				M	

== Group stage ==
=== Group A ===
Pos	Team	Pld	W	L	GF	GA	GD	PF	PA	PD	Pts	Qualification
1	Greysia Polii (INA) Apriyani Rahayu (INA)	3	3	0	6	1	+5	142	106	+36	3	Advance to quarter-finals
2	Yuki Fukushima (JPN) Sayaka Hirota (JPN) (H)	3	2	1	5	3	+2	152	129	+23	2	Advance to quarter-finals
3	Chow Mei Kuan (MAS) Lee Meng Yean (MAS)	3	1	2	3	4	−1	117	136	−19	1	
4	Chloe Birch (GBR) Lauren Smith (GBR)	3	0	3	0	6	−6	86	126	−40	0	

Source: TOCOG
(H) Host

Date	Time	Pair 1	Score	Pair 2	Set 1	Set 2	Set 3
24 July	09:00	Greysia Polii (Indonesia); Apriyani Rahayu (Indonesia)	2–0 (Note: Archived 30 July 2021 at the Wayback Machine)	(Malaysia) Chow Mei Kuan (Malaysia) Lee Meng Yean	21–14	21–17	
24 July	20:40	Yuki Fukushima (Japan); Sayaka Hirota (Japan)	2–0 (Note: Archived 29 July 2021 at the Wayback Machine)	(United Kingdom) Chloe Birch (United Kingdom) Lauren Smith	21–13	21–14	
25 July	19:20	Yuki Fukushima (Japan); Sayaka Hirota (Japan)	2–1 (Note: Archived 24 July 2021 at the Wayback Machine)	(Malaysia) Chow Mei Kuan (Malaysia) Lee Meng Yean	17–21	21–15	21–8
26 July	18:00	Greysia Polii (Indonesia); Apriyani Rahayu (Indonesia)	2–0 (Note: Archived 27 July 2021 at the Wayback Machine)	(United Kingdom) Chloe Birch (United Kingdom) Lauren Smith	21–11	21–13	
27 July	10:40	Yuki Fukushima (Japan); Sayaka Hirota (Japan)	1–2 (Note: Archived 27 July 2021 at the Wayback Machine)	(Indonesia) Greysia Polii (Indonesia) Apriyani Rahayu	22–24	21–13	8–21
27 July	10:40	Chow Mei Kuan (Malaysia); Lee Meng Yean (Malaysia)	2–0 (Note: Archived 28 July 2021 at the Wayback Machine)	(United Kingdom) Chloe Birch (United Kingdom) Lauren Smith	21–19	21–16	

=== Group B ===
Pos	Team	Pld	W	L	GF	GA	GD	PF	PA	PD	Pts	Qualification
1	Mayu Matsumoto (JPN) Wakana Nagahara (JPN) (H)	3	3	0	6	1	+5	143	105	+38	3	Advance to quarter-finals
2	Selena Piek (NED) Cheryl Seinen (NED)	3	2	1	4	3	+1	137	111	+26	2	Advance to quarter-finals
3	Rachel Honderich (CAN) Kristen Tsai (CAN)	3	1	2	4	4	0	150	125	+25	1	
4	Doha Hany (EGY) Hadia Hosny (EGY)	3	0	3	0	6	−6	37	126	−89	0	

Source: TOCOG
(H) Host

Date	Time	Pair 1	Score	Pair 2	Set 1	Set 2	Set 3
24 July	18:00	Mayu Matsumoto (Japan); Wakana Nagahara (Japan)	2–0 (Note: Archived 24 July 2021 at the Wayback Machine)	(Egypt) Doha Hany (Egypt) Hadia Hosny	21–7	21–3	
24 July	18:40	Selena Piek (Netherlands); Cheryl Seinen (Netherlands)	2–1 (Note: Archived 24 July 2021 at the Wayback Machine)	(Canada) Rachel Honderich (Canada) Kristen Tsai	16–21	21–14	21–15
25 July	20:00	Mayu Matsumoto (Japan); Wakana Nagahara (Japan)	2–1 (Note: Archived 25 July 2021 at the Wayback Machine)	(Canada) Rachel Honderich (Canada) Kristen Tsai	14–21	21–19	21–18
26 July	19:20	Selena Piek (Netherlands); Cheryl Seinen (Netherlands)	2–0 (Note: Archived 25 July 2021 at the Wayback Machine)	(Egypt) Doha Hany (Egypt) Hadia Hosny	21–6	21–10	
27 July	18:00	Mayu Matsumoto (Japan); Wakana Nagahara (Japan)	2–0 (Note: Archived 28 July 2021 at the Wayback Machine)	(Netherlands) Selena Piek (Netherlands) Cheryl Seinen	24–22	21–15	
27 July	18:40	Rachel Honderich (Canada); Kristen Tsai (Canada)	2–0 (Note: Archived 27 July 2021 at the Wayback Machine)	(Egypt) Doha Hany (Egypt) Hadia Hosny	21–5	21–6	

=== Group C ===
Pos	Team	Pld	W	L	GF	GA	GD	PF	PA	PD	Pts	Qualification
1	Lee So-hee (KOR) Shin Seung-chan (KOR)	3	2	1	5	2	+3	144	104	+40	2 (Note: Head-to-head point: South Korea 1, China 0.)	Advance to quarter-finals
2	Du Yue (CHN) Li Yinhui (CHN)	3	2	1	4	2	+2	115	91	+24	2	Advance to quarter-finals
3	Setyana Mapasa (AUS) Gronya Somerville (AUS)	3	1	2	2	5	−3	91	136	−45	1 (Note: Head-to-head point: Australia 1, Denmark 0.)	
4	Maiken Fruergaard (DEN) Sara Thygesen (DEN)	3	1	2	3	5	−2	138	157	−19	1	

Source: TOCOG
Notes:

Date	Time	Pair 1	Score	Pair 2	Set 1	Set 2	Set 3
24 July	11:00	Du Yue (China); Li Yinhui (China)	2–0 (Note: Archived 25 July 2021 at the Wayback Machine)	(Denmark) Maiken Fruergaard (Denmark) Sara Thygesen	21–13	21–15	
24 July	18:40	Lee So-hee (South Korea); Shin Seung-chan (South Korea)	2–0 (Note: Archived 24 July 2021 at the Wayback Machine)	(Australia) Setyana Mapasa (Australia) Gronya Somerville	21–9	21–6	
25 July	13:20	Lee So-hee (South Korea); Shin Seung-chan (South Korea)	1–2 (Note: Archived 24 July 2021 at the Wayback Machine)	(Denmark) Maiken Fruergaard (Denmark) Sara Thygesen	21–15	19–21	20–22
26 July	20:00	Du Yue (China); Li Yinhui (China)	2–0 (Note: Archived 26 July 2021 at the Wayback Machine)	(Australia) Setyana Mapasa (Australia) Gronya Somerville	21–9	21–12	
27 July	11:20	Maiken Fruergaard (Denmark); Sara Thygesen (Denmark)	1–2 (Note: Archived 26 July 2021 at the Wayback Machine)	(Australia) Setyana Mapasa (Australia) Gronya Somerville	19–21	21–13	12–21
27 July	20:00	Lee So-hee (South Korea); Shin Seung-chan (South Korea)	2–0 (Note: Archived 26 July 2021 at the Wayback Machine)	(China) Du Yue (China) Li Yinhui	21–19	21–12	

=== Group D ===
Pos	Team	Pld	W	L	GF	GA	GD	PF	PA	PD	Pts	Qualification
1	Chen Qingchen (CHN) Jia Yifan (CHN)	3	3	0	6	1	+5	145	100	+45	3	Advance to quarter-finals
2	Kim So-yeong (KOR) Kong Hee-yong (KOR)	3	2	1	5	3	+2	161	158	+3	2	Advance to quarter-finals
3	Gabriela Stoeva (BUL) Stefani Stoeva (BUL)	3	1	2	3	5	−2	147	156	−9	1	
4	Jongkolphan Kititharakul (THA) Rawinda Prajongjai (THA)	3	0	3	1	6	−5	106	145	−39	0	

Source: TOCOG

Date	Time	Pair 1	Score	Pair 2	Set 1	Set 2	Set 3
24 July	11:40	Chen Qingchen (China); Jia Yifan (China)	2–0 (Note: Archived 24 July 2021 at the Wayback Machine)	(Thailand) Jongkolphan Kititharakul (Thailand) Rawinda Prajongjai	21–6	21–10	
24 July	11:40	Kim So-yeong (South Korea); Kong Hee-yong (South Korea)	2–1 (Note: Archived 25 July 2021 at the Wayback Machine)	(Bulgaria) Gabriela Stoeva (Bulgaria) Stefani Stoeva	21–23	21–12	23–21
25 July	10:40	Kim So-yeong (South Korea); Kong Hee-yong (South Korea)	2–0 (Note: Archived 26 July 2021 at the Wayback Machine)	(Thailand) Jongkolphan Kititharakul (Thailand) Rawinda Prajongjai	21–19	24–22	
26 July	13:20	Chen Qingchen (China); Jia Yifan (China)	2–0 (Note: Archived 25 July 2021 at the Wayback Machine)	(Bulgaria) Gabriela Stoeva (Bulgaria) Stefani Stoeva	21–18	21–15	
27 July	12:00	Chen Qingchen (China); Jia Yifan (China)	2–1 (Note: Archived 26 July 2021 at the Wayback Machine)	(South Korea) Kim So-yeong (South Korea) Kong Hee-yong	19–21	21–16	21–14
27 July	19:20	Gabriela Stoeva (Bulgaria); Stefani Stoeva (Bulgaria)	2–1 (Note: Archived 26 July 2021 at the Wayback Machine)	(Thailand) Jongkolphan Kititharakul (Thailand) Rawinda Prajongjai	21–11	16–21	21–17

== Finals ==
The quarter-finals were held on 29 July 2021, the semi-finals on 31 July, and the medal matches on 2 August 2021.

Quarter-finals
A1	Greysia Polii (INA); Apriyani Rahayu (INA)	21	20	21
C2	Du Yue (CHN); Li Yinhui (CHN)	15	22	17
C1	Lee So-hee (KOR); Shin Seung-chan (KOR)	21	21
B2	Selena Piek (NED); Cheryl Seinen (NED)	8	17
D2	Kim So-yeong (KOR); Kong Hee-yong (KOR)	21	14	28
B1	Mayu Matsumoto (JPN); Wakana Nagahara (JPN)	14	21	26
A2	Yuki Fukushima (JPN); Sayaka Hirota (JPN)	21	10	10
D1	Chen Qingchen (CHN); Jia Yifan (CHN)	18	21	21

Semi-finals
A1	Greysia Polii (INA); Apriyani Rahayu (INA)	21	21
C1	Lee So-hee (KOR); Shin Seung-chan (KOR)	19	17
D2	Kim So-yeong (KOR); Kong Hee-yong (KOR)	15	11
D1	Chen Qingchen (CHN); Jia Yifan (CHN)	21	21

Gold medal match
A1	Greysia Polii (INA); Apriyani Rahayu (INA)	21	21
D1	Chen Qingchen (CHN); Jia Yifan (CHN)	19	15
Bronze medal match
C1	Lee So-hee (KOR); Shin Seung-chan (KOR)	10	17
D2	Kim So-yeong (KOR); Kong Hee-yong (KOR)	21	21
