= Badminton at the 2020 Summer Olympics – Men's doubles =

Olympics event

Men's doubles at the Games of the XXXII Olympiad
- Venue: Musashino Forest Sport Plaza
- Dates: 24–31 July 2021
- Competitors: 32 (16 pairs) from 14 nations

Medalists
1st place, gold medalist(s)		Lee Yang; Wang Chi-lin	Chinese Taipei
2nd place, silver medalist(s)		Li Junhui; Liu Yuchen	China
3rd place, bronze medalist(s)		Aaron Chia; Soh Wooi Yik	Malaysia

The men's doubles badminton tournament at the 2020 Summer Olympics took place from 24 to 31 July at the Musashino Forest Sport Plaza at Tokyo. There were 16 pairs from 14 nations competing.

Lee Yang and Wang Chi-lin of Chinese Taipei defeated China's Li Junhui and Liu Yuchen in the final, 21–18, 21–12, to win the gold medal in men's doubles badminton at the 2020 Summer Olympics. It was Chinese Taipei's first gold medal in Olympic badminton, and marked the first time since 2008 that the winner of the event was not from the People's Republic of China. In the bronze-medal match, Malaysia's Aaron Chia and Soh Wooi Yik defeated Indonesia's Mohammad Ahsan and Hendra Setiawan, 17–21, 21–17, 21–14. It was Malaysia's second consecutive medal in the event.

China's Fu Haifeng and Zhang Nan were the reigning gold medalists from 2016, but Fu retired from international badminton in 2017 and Zhang chose not to participate in the event.

== Background ==
This was the 8th appearance of the event as a full medal event. Badminton was introduced as a demonstration sport in 1972, held again as an exhibition sport in 1988, and added to the full programme in 1992; the men's doubles tournament has been held since.

The reigning champions were Fu Haifeng and Zhang Nan of China, who were not defending their title. Fu retired after the 2016 Games, having reached three consecutive finals with two different partners (Zhang and Cai Yun) and winning two gold medals and a silver medal. The top two qualifying teams were both from Indonesia: Marcus Fernaldi Gideon/Kevin Sanjaya Sukamuljo and Mohammad Ahsan/Hendra Setiawan. The latter pair were also reigning world champions from the 2019 BWF World Championships.

== Qualification ==
The badminton qualification system provided for 16 men's doubles teams (32 players). Following revisions due to the COVID-19 pandemic, the qualifying periods were set from 29 April 2019 to 15 March 2020 and from 4 January to 13 June 2021, with the ranking list of 15 June 2021 deciding qualification.

Qualification was done entirely through the ranking list. Nations with at least two pairs in the top 8 were able to send a maximum of 2 pairs (4 players); all other nations were limited to a single pair. Pairs were taken from the ranking list in order, respecting those national limits, until 16 pairs were selected. However, each continent was guaranteed to have at least one pair with the lowest-ranking pairs displaced if necessary to make room for a continental guarantee.

== Competition format ==
The tournament was started with a group phase round-robin. There were four groups of four teams each; the top two highest-ranked pairs from each group advanced to the knockout stage. The knockout stage was a three-round single-elimination tournament with a bronze medal match.

Matches were played best-of-three games. Each game was played to 21, except that a pair must win by 2 unless the score reached 30–29.

== Seeds ==
1. Marcus Fernaldi Gideon / Kevin Sanjaya Sukamuljo (INA) (quarter-finals)
2. Mohammad Ahsan / Hendra Setiawan (INA) (fourth place)
3. Li Junhui / Liu Yuchen (CHN) (silver medalists)
4. Hiroyuki Endo / Yuta Watanabe (JPN) (quarter-finals)

== Schedule ==
The tournament was held over an 8-day period, with 7 competition days and 1 open day.

Legend

P	Preliminaries	QF	Quarter-finals	SF	Semi-finals	M	Medal matches

Date	24 Jul		25 Jul		26 Jul		27 Jul		28 Jul		29 Jul		30 Jul		31 Jul		1 Aug		2 Aug	
Event	M	E	M	E	M	E	M	E	M	E	M	E	M	A	M	E	A	E	A	E
Men's doubles	P										QF			SF		M				

== Group stage ==
=== Group A ===
Pos	Team	Pld	W	L	GF	GA	GD	PF	PA	PD	Pts	Qualification
1	Marcus Fernaldi Gideon (INA) Kevin Sanjaya Sukamuljo (INA)	3	2	1	5	2	+3	140	108	+32	2 (Note: Head-to-head point: Indonesia 1, India 1, Chinese Taipei 1.)	Advance to quarter-finals
2	Lee Yang (TPE) Wang Chi-lin (TPE)	3	2	1	5	3	+2	161	151	+10	2	Advance to quarter-finals
3	Satwiksairaj Rankireddy (IND) Chirag Shetty (IND)	3	2	1	4	3	+1	131	140	−9	2	
4	Ben Lane (GBR) Sean Vendy (GBR)	3	0	3	0	6	−6	93	126	−33	0	

Source: TOCOG
Notes:

Date	Time	Pair 1	Score	Pair 2	Set 1	Set 2	Set 3
24 July	12:20	Marcus Fernaldi Gideon (Indonesia); Kevin Sanjaya Sukamuljo (Indonesia)	2–0 (Note: Archived 25 July 2021 at the Wayback Machine)	(United Kingdom) Ben Lane (United Kingdom) Sean Vendy	21–15	21–11	
24 July	12:20	Lee Yang (Chinese Taipei); Wang Chi-lin (Chinese Taipei)	1–2 (Note: Archived 26 July 2021 at the Wayback Machine)	(India) Satwiksairaj Rankireddy (India) Chirag Shetty	16–21	21–16	25–27
26 July	11:20	Lee Yang (Chinese Taipei); Wang Chi-lin (Chinese Taipei)	2–0 (Note: Archived 25 July 2021 at the Wayback Machine)	(United Kingdom) Ben Lane (United Kingdom) Sean Vendy	21–17	21–14	
26 July	12:40	Marcus Fernaldi Gideon (Indonesia); Kevin Sanjaya Sukamuljo (Indonesia)	2–0 (Note: Archived 26 July 2021 at the Wayback Machine)	(India) Satwiksairaj Rankireddy (India) Chirag Shetty	21–13	21–12	
27 July	12:00	Marcus Fernaldi Gideon (Indonesia); Kevin Sanjaya Sukamuljo (Indonesia)	1–2 (Note: Archived 27 July 2021 at the Wayback Machine)	(Chinese Taipei) Lee Yang (Chinese Taipei) Wang Chi-lin	18–21	21–15	17–21
27 July	12:00	Satwiksairaj Rankireddy (India); Chirag Shetty (India)	2–0 (Note: Archived 26 July 2021 at the Wayback Machine)	(United Kingdom) Ben Lane (United Kingdom) Sean Vendy	21–17	21–19	

=== Group B ===
Pos	Team	Pld	W	L	GF	GA	GD	PF	PA	PD	Pts	Qualification
1	Hiroyuki Endo (JPN) Yuta Watanabe (JPN) (H)	3	3	0	6	0	+6	126	73	+53	3	Advance to quarter-finals
2	Kim Astrup (DEN) Anders Skaarup Rasmussen (DEN)	3	2	1	4	2	+2	110	90	+20	2	Advance to quarter-finals
3	Vladimir Ivanov (ROC) Ivan Sozonov (ROC)	3	1	2	2	4	−2	111	102	+9	1	
4	Godwin Olofua (NGR) Anuoluwapo Juwon Opeyori (NGR)	3	0	3	0	6	−6	44	126	−82	0	

Source: TOCOG
(H) Host

Date	Time	Pair 1	Score	Pair 2	Set 1	Set 2	Set 3
24 July	13:00	Kim Astrup (Denmark); Anders Skaarup Rasmussen (Denmark)	2–0 (Note: Archived 24 July 2021 at the Wayback Machine)	(Russia) Vladimir Ivanov (Russia) Ivan Sozonov	21–13	21–18	
24 July	20:00	Hiroyuki Endo (Japan); Yuta Watanabe (Japan)	2–0 (Note: Archived 25 July 2021 at the Wayback Machine)	(Nigeria) Godwin Olofua (Nigeria) Anuoluwapo Juwon Opeyori	21–2	21–7	
25 July	12:40	Hiroyuki Endo (Japan); Yuta Watanabe (Japan)	2–0 (Note: Archived 24 July 2021 at the Wayback Machine)	(Russia) Vladimir Ivanov (Russia) Ivan Sozonov	21–19	21–19	
26 July	18:00	Kim Astrup (Denmark); Anders Skaarup Rasmussen (Denmark)	2–0 (Note: Archived 25 July 2021 at the Wayback Machine)	(Nigeria) Godwin Olofua (Nigeria) Anuoluwapo Juwon Opeyori	21–7	21–10	
27 July	11:20	Hiroyuki Endo (Japan); Yuta Watanabe (Japan)	2–0 (Note: Archived 25 July 2021 at the Wayback Machine)	(Denmark) Kim Astrup (Denmark) Anders Skaarup Rasmussen	21–14	21–12	
27 July	18:40	Vladimir Ivanov (Russia); Ivan Sozonov (Russia)	2–0 (Note: Archived 25 July 2021 at the Wayback Machine)	(Nigeria) Godwin Olofua (Nigeria) Anuoluwapo Juwon Opeyori	21–8	21–10	

=== Group C ===
Pos	Team	Pld	W	L	GF	GA	GD	PF	PA	PD	Pts	Qualification
1	Li Junhui (CHN) Liu Yuchen (CHN)	3	3	0	6	0	+6	126	83	+43	3	Advance to quarter-finals
2	Takeshi Kamura (JPN) Keigo Sonoda (JPN) (H)	3	2	1	4	2	+2	114	77	+37	2	Advance to quarter-finals
3	Mark Lamsfuß (GER) Marvin Seidel (GER)	3	1	2	2	4	−2	90	110	−20	1	
4	Phillip Chew (USA) Ryan Chew (USA)	3	0	3	0	6	−6	66	126	−60	0	

Source: TOCOG
(H) Host

Date	Time	Pair 1	Score	Pair 2	Set 1	Set 2	Set 3
24 July	11:00	Li Junhui (China); Liu Yuchen (China)	2–0 (Note: Archived 25 July 2021 at the Wayback Machine)	(United States) Phillip Chew (United States) Ryan Chew	21–9	21–17	
24 July	19:20	Takeshi Kamura (Japan); Keigo Sonoda (Japan)	2–0 (Note: Archived 24 July 2021 at the Wayback Machine)	(Germany) Mark Lamsfuß (Germany) Marvin Seidel	21–13	21–8	
25 July	18:40	Li Junhui (China); Liu Yuchen (China)	2–0 (Note: Archived 25 July 2021 at the Wayback Machine)	(Germany) Mark Lamsfuß (Germany) Marvin Seidel	21–14	21–13	
26 July	10:00	Takeshi Kamura (Japan); Keigo Sonoda (Japan)	2–0 (Note: Archived 25 July 2021 at the Wayback Machine)	(United States) Phillip Chew (United States) Ryan Chew	21–11	21–3	
27 July	10:00	Li Junhui (China); Liu Yuchen (China)	2–0 (Note: Archived 28 July 2021 at the Wayback Machine)	(Japan) Takeshi Kamura (Japan) Keigo Sonoda	21–14	21–16	
27 July	18:00	Mark Lamsfuß (Germany); Marvin Seidel (Germany)	2–0 (Note: Archived 26 July 2021 at the Wayback Machine)	(United States) Phillip Chew (United States) Ryan Chew	21–10	21–16	

=== Group D ===
Pos	Team	Pld	W	L	GF	GA	GD	PF	PA	PD	Pts	Qualification
1	Mohammad Ahsan (INA) Hendra Setiawan (INA)	3	3	0	6	1	+5	145	109	+36	3	Advance to quarter-finals
2	Aaron Chia (MAS) Soh Wooi Yik (MAS)	3	2	1	4	2	+2	122	107	+15	2	Advance to quarter-finals
3	Choi Sol-gyu (KOR) Seo Seung-jae (KOR)	3	1	2	3	4	−1	130	128	+2	1	
4	Jason Ho-Shue (CAN) Nyl Yakura (CAN)	3	0	3	0	6	−6	73	126	−53	0	

Source: TOCOG

Date	Time	Pair 1	Score	Pair 2	Set 1	Set 2	Set 3
24 July	18:00	Mohammad Ahsan (Indonesia); Hendra Setiawan (Indonesia)	2–0 (Note: Archived 25 July 2021 at the Wayback Machine)	(Canada) Jason Ho-Shue (Canada) Nyl Yakura	21–12	21–11	
24 July	18:00	Choi Sol-gyu (South Korea); Seo Seung-jae (South Korea)	0–2 (Note: Archived 24 July 2021 at the Wayback Machine)	(Malaysia) Aaron Chia (Malaysia) Soh Wooi Yik	22–24	15–21	
25 July	10:00	Choi Sol-gyu (South Korea); Seo Seung-jae (South Korea)	2–0 (Note: Archived 24 July 2021 at the Wayback Machine)	(Canada) Jason Ho-Shue (Canada) Nyl Yakura	21–14	21–8	
26 July	19:20	Mohammad Ahsan (Indonesia); Hendra Setiawan (Indonesia)	2–0 (Note: Archived 26 July 2021 at the Wayback Machine)	(Malaysia) Aaron Chia (Malaysia) Soh Wooi Yik	21–16	21–19	
27 July	12:40	Mohammad Ahsan (Indonesia); Hendra Setiawan (Indonesia)	2–1 (Note: Archived 27 July 2021 at the Wayback Machine)	(South Korea) Choi Sol-gyu (South Korea) Seo Seung-jae	21–12	19–21	21–18
27 July	20:00	Aaron Chia (Malaysia); Soh Wooi Yik (Malaysia)	2–0 (Note: Archived 28 July 2021 at the Wayback Machine)	(Canada) Jason Ho-Shue (Canada) Nyl Yakura	21–15	21–13	

== Finals ==
The quarter-finals were held on 29 July 2021, the semi-finals on the next day, and the medal matches on 31 July 2021.

Quarter-finals
A1	Marcus Fernaldi Gideon (INA); Kevin Sanjaya Sukamuljo (INA)	14	17
D2	Aaron Chia (MAS); Soh Wooi Yik (MAS)	21	21
C1	Li Junhui (CHN); Liu Yuchen (CHN)	12	21	21
B2	Kim Astrup (DEN); Anders Skaarup Rasmussen (DEN)	21	14	19
A2	Lee Yang (TPE); Wang Chi-lin (TPE)	21	21
B1	Hiroyuki Endo (JPN); Yuta Watanabe (JPN)	16	19
C2	Takeshi Kamura (JPN); Keigo Sonoda (JPN)	14	21	9
D1	Mohammad Ahsan (INA); Hendra Setiawan (INA)	21	16	21

Semi-finals
D2	Aaron Chia (MAS); Soh Wooi Yik (MAS)	22	13
C1	Li Junhui (CHN); Liu Yuchen (CHN)	24	21
A2	Lee Yang (TPE); Wang Chi-lin (TPE)	21	21
D1	Mohammad Ahsan (INA); Hendra Setiawan (INA)	11	10

Gold medal match
C1	Li Junhui (CHN); Liu Yuchen (CHN)	18	12
A2	Lee Yang (TPE); Wang Chi-lin (TPE)	21	21
Bronze medal match
D2	Aaron Chia (MAS); Soh Wooi Yik (MAS)	17	21	21
D1	Mohammad Ahsan (INA); Hendra Setiawan (INA)	21	17	14
