= Aaron Chia =

Malaysian badminton player (born 1997)

Aaron Chia 謝定峰
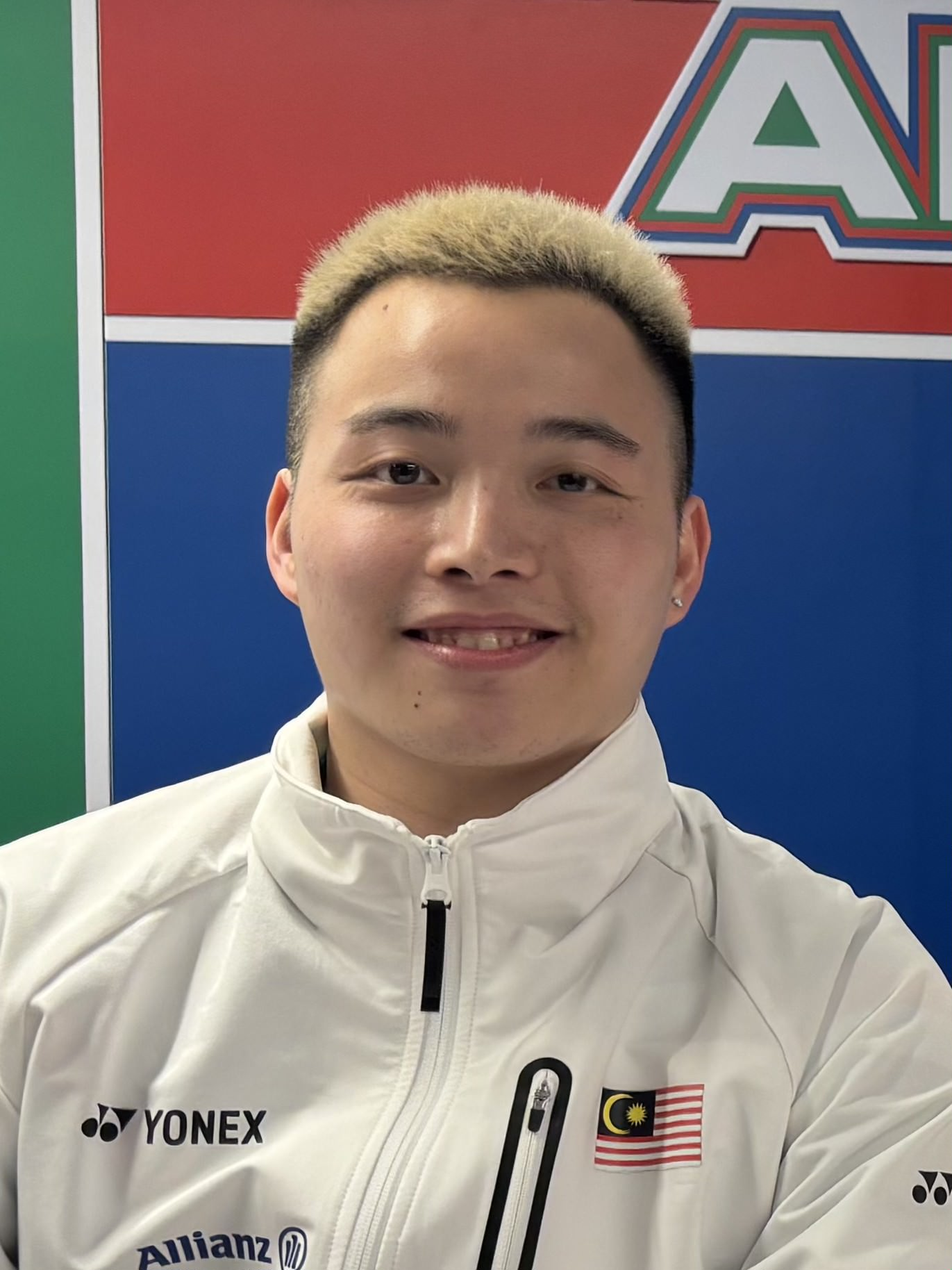
- Chia at the 2025 Petronas Malaysia Open

Personal information
- Born: Aaron Chia Teng Fong; 24 February 1997 (age 29) Batu Berendam, Malacca, Malaysia
- Height: 1.68 m (5 ft 6 in)

Sport
- Country: Malaysia
- Sport: Badminton
- Handedness: Right
- Coached by: Rexy Mainaky; Herry Iman Pierngadi

Men's doubles
- Highest ranking: 2 (with Soh Wooi Yik, 24 January 2023)
- Current ranking: 4 (with Soh Wooi Yik, 10 November 2026)
- BWF profile
Medal record
Men's badminton
Representing Malaysia
Olympic Games
Bronze medal – third place	2020 Tokyo	Men's doubles
Bronze medal – third place	2024 Paris	Men's doubles
World Championships
Gold medal – first place	2022 Tokyo	Men's doubles
Silver medal – second place	2026 New Delhi	Men's doubles
Bronze medal – third place	2023 Copenhagen	Men's doubles
Sudirman Cup
Bronze medal – third place	2021 Vantaa	Mixed team
Bronze medal – third place	2023 Suzhou	Mixed team
Thomas Cup
Bronze medal – third place	2024 Chengdu	Men's team
Commonwealth Games
Gold medal – first place	2022 Birmingham	Mixed team
Bronze medal – third place	2022 Birmingham	Men's doubles
Asian Games
Bronze medal – third place	2022 Hangzhou	Men's doubles
Asian Championships
Gold medal – first place	2025 Ningbo	Men's doubles
Silver medal – second place	2022 Manila	Men's doubles
Bronze medal – third place	2024 Ningbo	Men's doubles
Asia Team Championships
Gold medal – first place	2022 Selangor	Men's team
Silver medal – second place	2020 Manila	Men's team
Silver medal – second place	2024 Selangor	Men's team
SEA Games
Gold medal – first place	2019 Philippines	Men's doubles
Silver medal – second place	2019 Philippines	Men's team
Silver medal – second place	2025 Thailand	Men's doubles
Silver medal – second place	2025 Thailand	Men's team

Aaron Chia Teng Fong (Note: Chinese: 謝定峰; pinyin: Xiè Dìngfēng; In this Chinese name, the family name is Chia. In accordance with custom, the Western-style name is Aaron Chia and the Chinese-style name is Chia Teng Fong) KMW BCM (born 24 February 1997) is a Malaysian badminton player. A world champion, an Asian champion and a double bronze medalist at the Olympic Games, he and his partner Soh Wooi Yik became the first ever world badminton champions from Malaysia after winning the men's doubles title at the 2022 World Championships.

Together, they also won a gold medal at the 2019 SEA Games and 2025 Asian Championships, silver medals at the 2026 World Championships, 2022 Asian Championships and 2025 SEA Games, as well as bronze medals at the 2020 and 2024 Summer Olympics, 2022 Commonwealth Games, 2023 World Championships, 2022 Asian Games and 2024 Asian Championships. They are also the first Malaysian men's doubles pair to win consecutive medals at the Olympic Games.

== Early and personal life ==
Chia was born in Batu Berendam, Melaka to Malaysian Chinese parents, Chan Mee Kee and Chia Boon Foo. He is the second of three siblings. His interest in badminton began at the age of four when he often followed his father to the badminton court. Chia represented Melaka when he was just 11 years old. At the age of 14, he managed to enter Bukit Jalil Sports School (SSBJ) and started training with the Badminton Association of Malaysia (BAM) when he was in Form 5.

Chia is married to Goh Mui Kee and the couple has two daughters.

== Career ==
He has joined the national team since 2015.

=== 2015 ===
In September, Chia partnered Soh Wooi Yik and reached the final of Malaysia Junior International, finishing as runners-up.

In November, the duo competed at the 2015 World Junior Championships but crashed out in the fourth round.

=== 2016–2017 ===
In October 2016, he and his partner Wong Wai Jun were the runners-up at the Swiss International.

Before the end of the 2017 season, Chia reunited with Soh and managed to qualify for the finals of the India International.

=== 2018 ===
In March, Chia and Soh participated in their second international final at the Vietnam International, but failed to win the title.

In the following month, they got into the final of Malaysia International but lost out narrowly to Mohammad Ahsan and Hendra Setiawan.

In August, the pair made their debut at the 2018 World Championships where they reached the quarter-finals before losing out to Li Junhui and Liu Yuchen.

In November, they reached the final of SaarLorLux Open but went down to Marcus Ellis and Chris Langridge in three games.

=== 2019–2020: All England runner-up & SEA Games gold ===
In March 2019, Chia and Soh participated in the All England Open where they emerged as a surprise finalist. The pair settled for second best after losing to Ahsan and Setiawan in the final. In December 2019, he helped the Malaysian team to win a silver medal in the men's team event at the 2019 SEA Games. He and Soh then took part in the men's doubles event and went on to win the gold, beating Bodin Isara and Maneepong Jongjit in the final.

He was also part of Malaysia's men's team that won silver at the 2020 Asia Team Championships in February.

=== 2021: First Olympic bronze ===
In January, Chia and Soh reached their third BWF World Tour final at the Thailand Open and finished as the runner-ups.

In late July, the duo made their debut appearance in the men's doubles event at the 2020 Summer Olympics. The duo prevailed against Ahsan and Setiawan 17–21, 21–17, 21–14 in the bronze medal playoff, winning bronze for Malaysia.

He was one of the Malaysian players that won bronze at the 2021 Sudirman Cup in late September.

=== 2022: First world title for Malaysia ===
Chia was part of the Malaysian men's team that won gold at the 2022 Asia Team Championships in February.

In late April, he and Soh entered the 2022 Asian Championships final but were bested by Indonesians Pramudya Kusumawardana and Yeremia Rambitan.

In August, he won a gold medal in the mixed team event at the 2022 Commonwealth Games. He also won a bronze medal in the men's doubles event with Soh, ending his debut campaign with two medals. A few weeks later, Chia and Soh competed at the 2022 World Championships as the sixth seeds. In the final, they defeated three-time world champions Ahsan and Setiawan 21–19, 21–14 to clinch Malaysia's first ever gold medal at the tournament.

=== 2023: First BWF World Tour title ===
In the first half of 2023, Chia and Soh did not manage to win any of the tournaments they participated in. Their most notable achievements were reaching the finals of India Open in January and Indonesia Open in June. Chia also helped the Malaysian team win a second consecutive bronze medal at the 2023 Sudirman Cup in May.

In August, Chia and Soh were unable to defend their title at the 2023 World Championships. They settled for the bronze medal after losing to the eventual champions, Kang Min-hyuk and Seo Seung-jae, in the semi-finals.

They then contested their third final of the year at the China Open in September. However, they went down to Liang Weikeng and Wang Chang in straight games.

In October, the pair concluded their debut campaign at the 2022 Asian Games with a bronze medal finish in the men's doubles event. A few weeks later, they triumphed against Muhammad Shohibul Fikri and Bagas Maulana in the Denmark Open final, finally putting an end to their six-year wait for a BWF World Tour title.

=== 2024: Second All England runner-up finish & second Olympic bronze ===
In February, Chia won his second silver medal as a part of Malaysia's men's team at the 2024 Asia Team Championships.

In March, he and Soh participated in the All England Open and brought home the silver medals again after surprisingly doing so five years ago in 2019. They lost to Fajar Alfian and Muhammad Rian Ardianto of Indonesia after going down with the score of 16–21, 16–21.

In the following month, the pair lost in the semi-finals of the 2024 Asian Championships, securing them a bronze medal.

In early August, he and Soh participated in the 2024 Summer Olympics, their second Olympic appearance. They lost to China's Liang and Wang in the semi-finals 19–21, 21–15, 17–21. In the bronze medal match, he and Soh retained their Olympic bronze medals, defeating Kim Astrup and Anders Skaarup Rasmussen of Denmark in three tight games, 16–21, 22–20, 21–19. With the victory, they became the first-ever Malaysian men's doubles pair to win back-to-back Olympic medals.

In November, Chia and Soh clinched the Korea Masters title, becoming the first Malaysian pair to win the tournament.

=== 2025: Asian Championships title ===
Chia with his normal partner, Soh started the tour with good starting point, reaching semifinals in the India Open. The next week, they repeated the same feat in Indonesia Masters, beaten by their compatriots, Man Wei Chong and Tee Kai Wun who did go on to win the whole tournament. Although no success in the first three months, Chia and Soh won their first Asian Championships in April, defeating Chen Boyang and Liu Yi of China in their opponent homeground.

In May, Chia and Soh maintained their momentum by snatching their first title of the year in Thailand Open in grueling three sets. Chia and Soh made the final of Malaysia Masters but for the second time in a year, lost out to Man and Tee in an all-Malaysian finals bout. On the next week, Chia and Soh surging through their good form and making the final for three straight competition, this time winning the Singapore Open. Chia and Soh reached the China Open final in July but lost to the Indonesian makeshift pair of Fajar Alfian and Muhammad Shohibul Fikri, thus continuing their droughts of gaining the Super 1000 titles after failing in their sixth attempts.

Chia and Soh reached the next final at Arctic Open in October but they are defeated by Ben Lane and Sean Vendy. In December, he won two silver medals in the SEA Games in Thailand. He and his partner, Soh, helps the team reached the final, but they were beaten by Sabar Karyaman Gutama and Muhammad Reza Pahlevi Isfahani where the team lost 0–3 in the finals tie against Indonesia. Their pace in the individual men's doubles also stopped by Gutama and Isfahani in the final in straight game.

=== 2026 : Third All England runner-up finish & eighth Super 1000 runner-up ===
Chia and Soh were on the good form at the beginning of the year as they became the first Malaysian pair to advance to the Malaysia Open final in 12 years since Goh V Shem and Lim Khim Wah won it back in 2014. Unfortunately their luck ran out in the final as they were dispatched by the number one pair at that moment, Kim Won-ho and Seo Seung-jae in a nail-biting three games. Their next final of the year would be at the All England Open where Chia and Soh once again lost out against Kim and Seo in another three games match.

In June, the BAM head coach, Rexy Mainaky shuffled up the pair which saw Chia paired up with Aaron Tai for the Asian legs in July to August before the Asian Games. The double Aaron pair did well in the Taipei Open where they reached the final and lost to Indonesian's pair of Leo Rolly Carnando and Daniel Marthin. In October, Chia and Soh came back as a pair at the Denmark Open with a positive result. They strived in this tournament until the final in which they lost against the Indonesian pair of Fajar Alfian and Muhammad Shohibul Fikri in straight games.

== Awards ==
Year	Award	Category	Result
2021	Anugerah Sukan Negara	National Sportsman (with Soh Wooi Yik)	Nominated
2021	Anugerah Sukan Negara	Men's Team Sports (with Soh Wooi Yik)	Won
2022	Anugerah Sukan Negara	National Sportsman (with Soh Wooi Yik)	Won
2024	Anugerah Sukan Negara	National Sportsman (with Soh Wooi Yik)	Won

== Honours ==
- Malacca
  - Distinguished Service Star (BCM) (2021)
- Federal Territory
  - Officer of the Order of the Territorial Crown (KMW) (2022)

== Achievements ==
=== Olympic Games ===
Men's doubles
Year	Venue	Partner	Opponent	Score	Result	Ref.
2020	Musashino Forest Sport Plaza, Tokyo, Japan	(Malaysia) Soh Wooi Yik	(Indonesia) Mohammad Ahsan (Indonesia) Hendra Setiawan	17–21, 21–17, 21–14	Bronze	
2024	Porte de La Chapelle Arena, Paris, France	(Malaysia) Soh Wooi Yik	(Denmark) Kim Astrup (Denmark) Anders Skaarup Rasmussen	16–21, 22–20, 21–19	Bronze	

=== World Championships ===
Men's doubles
Year	Venue	Partner	Opponent	Score	Result	Ref.
2022	Tokyo Metropolitan Gymnasium, Tokyo, Japan	(Malaysia) Soh Wooi Yik	(Indonesia) Mohammad Ahsan (Indonesia) Hendra Setiawan	21–19, 21–14	Gold	
2023	Royal Arena, Copenhagen, Denmark	(Malaysia) Soh Wooi Yik	(South Korea) Kang Min-hyuk (South Korea) Seo Seung-jae	21–23, 13–21	Bronze	
2026	Indira Gandhi Arena, New Delhi, India	(Malaysia) Soh Wooi Yik	(China) Liang Weikeng (China) Wang Chang	17–21, 16–21	Silver	

=== Commonwealth Games ===
Men's doubles
Year	Venue	Partner	Opponent	Score	Result	Ref.
2022	National Exhibition Centre, Birmingham, England	(Malaysia) Soh Wooi Yik	(Malaysia) Chan Peng Soon (Malaysia) Tan Kian Meng	21–19, 11–21, 21–11	Bronze	

=== Asian Games ===
Men's doubles
Year	Venue	Partner	Opponent	Score	Result	Ref.
2022	Binjiang Gymnasium, Hangzhou, China	(Malaysia) Soh Wooi Yik	(India) Satwiksairaj Rankireddy (India) Chirag Shetty	17–21, 12–21	Bronze	

=== Asian Championships ===
Men's doubles
Year	Venue	Partner	Opponent	Score	Result	Ref.
2022	Muntinlupa Sports Complex, Metro Manila, Philippines	(Malaysia) Soh Wooi Yik	(Indonesia) Pramudya Kusumawardana (Indonesia) Yeremia Rambitan	21–23, 10–21	Silver	
2024	Ningbo Olympic Sports Center Gymnasium, Ningbo, China	(Malaysia) Soh Wooi Yik	(Malaysia) Goh Sze Fei (Malaysia) Nur Izzuddin	14–21, 18–21	Bronze	
2025	Ningbo Olympic Sports Center Gymnasium, Ningbo, China	(Malaysia) Soh Wooi Yik	(China) Chen Boyang (China) Liu Yi	21–19, 21–17	Gold	

=== SEA Games ===
Men's doubles
Year	Venue	Partner	Opponent	Score	Result	Ref.
2019	Muntinlupa Sports Complex, Metro Manila, Philippines	(Malaysia) Soh Wooi Yik	(Thailand) Bodin Isara (Thailand) Maneepong Jongjit	18–21, 21–15, 21–16	Gold	
2025	Gymnasium 4, Thammasat University Rangsit Campus, Pathum Thani, Thailand	(Malaysia) Soh Wooi Yik	(Indonesia) Sabar Karyaman Gutama (Indonesia) Muhammad Reza Pahlevi Isfahani	14–21, 17–21	Silver	

=== BWF World Tour (4 titles, 14 runners-up) ===
The BWF World Tour, which was announced on 19 March 2017 and implemented in 2018, is a series of elite badminton tournaments sanctioned by the Badminton World Federation (BWF). The BWF World Tour is divided into levels of World Tour Finals, Super 1000, Super 750, Super 500, Super 300, and the BWF Tour Super 100.

Men's doubles
Year	Tournament	Level	Partner	Opponent	Score	Result	Ref.
2018	SaarLorLux Open	Super 100	(Malaysia) Soh Wooi Yik	(England) Marcus Ellis (England) Chris Langridge	23–21, 18–21, 19–21	(silver) Runner-up	
2019	All England Open	Super 1000	(Malaysia) Soh Wooi Yik	(Indonesia) Mohammad Ahsan (Indonesia) Hendra Setiawan	21–11, 14–21, 12–21	(silver) Runner-up	
2020 (II)	Thailand Open	Super 1000	(Malaysia) Soh Wooi Yik	(Chinese Taipei) Lee Yang (Chinese Taipei) Wang Chi-lin	13–21, 18–21	(silver) Runner-up	
2023	India Open	Super 750	(Malaysia) Soh Wooi Yik	(China) Liang Weikeng (China) Wang Chang	21–14, 19–21, 18–21	(silver) Runner-up	
2023	Indonesia Open	Super 1000	(Malaysia) Soh Wooi Yik	(India) Satwiksairaj Rankireddy (India) Chirag Shetty	17–21, 18–21	(silver) Runner-up	
2023	China Open	Super 1000	(Malaysia) Soh Wooi Yik	(China) Liang Weikeng (China) Wang Chang	12–21, 14–21	(silver) Runner-up	
2023	Denmark Open	Super 750	(Malaysia) Soh Wooi Yik	(Indonesia) Muhammad Shohibul Fikri (Indonesia) Bagas Maulana	21–13, 21–17	(gold) Winner	
2024	All England Open	Super 1000	(Malaysia) Soh Wooi Yik	(Indonesia) Fajar Alfian (Indonesia) Muhammad Rian Ardianto	16–21, 16–21	(silver) Runner-up	
2024	Korea Masters	Super 300	(Malaysia) Soh Wooi Yik	(South Korea) Jin Yong (South Korea) Kim Won-ho	21–23, 21–19, 21–14	(gold) Winner	
2025	Thailand Open	Super 500	(Malaysia) Soh Wooi Yik	(Denmark) William Kryger Boe (Denmark) Christian Faust Kjær	20–22, 21–17, 21–12	(gold) Winner	
2025	Malaysia Masters	Super 500	(Malaysia) Soh Wooi Yik	(Malaysia) Man Wei Chong (Malaysia) Tee Kai Wun	12–21, 21–15, 16–21	(silver) Runner-up	
2025	Singapore Open	Super 750	(Malaysia) Soh Wooi Yik	(South Korea) Kim Won-ho (South Korea) Seo Seung-jae	15–21, 21–18, 21–19	(gold) Winner	
2025	China Open	Super 1000	(Malaysia) Soh Wooi Yik	(Indonesia) Fajar Alfian (Indonesia) Muhammad Shohibul Fikri	15–21, 14–21	(silver) Runner-up	
2025	Arctic Open	Super 500	(Malaysia) Soh Wooi Yik	(England) Ben Lane (England) Sean Vendy	18–21, 27–25, 17–21	(silver) Runner-up	
2026	Malaysia Open	Super 1000	(Malaysia) Soh Wooi Yik	(South Korea) Kim Won-ho (South Korea) Seo Seung-jae	15–21, 21–12, 18–21	(silver) Runner-up	
2026	All England Open	Super 1000	(Malaysia) Soh Wooi Yik	(South Korea) Kim Won-ho (South Korea) Seo Seung-jae	21–18, 12–21, 19–21	(silver) Runner-up	
2026	Taipei Open	Super 300	(Malaysia) Aaron Tai	(Indonesia) Leo Rolly Carnando (Indonesia) Daniel Marthin	21–23, 19–21	(silver) Runner-up	
2026	Denmark Open	Super 750	(Malaysia) Soh Wooi Yik	(Indonesia) Fajar Alfian (Indonesia) Muhammad Shohibul Fikri	8–21, 11–21	(silver) Runner-up	

=== BWF International Challenge/Series (4 runners-up) ===
Men's doubles
Year	Tournament	Partner	Opponent	Score	Result	Ref.
2016	Swiss International	(Malaysia) Wong Wai Jun	(Malaysia) Goh Sze Fei (Malaysia) Nur Izzuddin	18–21, 12–21	(silver) Runner-up	
2017	Tata Open India International	(Malaysia) Soh Wooi Yik	(Thailand) Maneepong Jongjit (Thailand) Nanthakarn Yordphaisong	6–21, 9–21	(silver) Runner-up	
2018	Vietnam International	(Malaysia) Soh Wooi Yik	(Thailand) Maneepong Jongjit (Thailand) Nanthakarn Yordphaisong	18–21, 14–21	(silver) Runner-up	
2018	Malaysia International	(Malaysia) Soh Wooi Yik	(Indonesia) Mohammad Ahsan (Indonesia) Hendra Setiawan	17–21, 21–17, 19–21	(silver) Runner-up	

BWF International Challenge tournament
BWF International Series tournament
BWF Future Series tournament

== Record against selected opponents ==
Record against year-end Finals finalists, World Championships semi-finalists, and Olympic quarter-finalists. Accurate as of 30 December 2025.

=== Soh Wooi Yik ===
Chia and Soh have a poor head-to-head record against Marcus Fernaldi Gideon and Kevin Sanjaya Sukamuljo (2–9), Li Junhui & Liu Yuchen (0–6), Liang Weikeng and Wang Chang (3–9), and also Takuro Hoki and Yugo Kobayashi (3–9).

Players	M	W	L	Diff.
(China) Chen Boyang & Liu Yi	4	3	1	+2
(China) He Jiting & Tan Qiang	2	0	2	–2
(China) Li Junhui & Liu Yuchen	6	0	6	–6
(China) Liang Weikeng & Wang Chang	12	3	9	–6
(China) Liu Cheng & Zhang Nan	2	2	0	+2
(China) Liu Yuchen & Ou Xuanyi	8	4	4	0
(Chinese Taipei) Chen Hung-ling & Wang Chi-lin	1	0	1	–1
(Chinese Taipei) Lee Yang & Wang Chi-lin	9	5	4	+1
(Denmark) Kim Astrup & Anders Skaarup Rasmussen	13	9	4	+5
(England) Marcus Ellis & Chris Langridge	3	2	1	+1
(India) Satwiksairaj Rankireddy & Chirag Shetty	17	11	6	+5
(Indonesia) Mohammad Ahsan & Hendra Setiawan	13	5	8	–3
(Indonesia) Fajar Alfian & Muhammad Rian Ardianto	10	6	4	+2

Players	M	W	L	Diff.
(Indonesia) Marcus Fernaldi Gideon & Kevin Sanjaya Sukamuljo	11	2	9	–7
(Japan) Takuro Hoki & Yugo Kobayashi	12	3	9	–6
(Japan) Hiroyuki Endo & Yuta Watanabe	2	0	2	–2
(Japan) Takeshi Kamura & Keigo Sonoda	2	0	2	–2
(Malaysia) Goh V Shem & Tan Wee Kiong	3	2	1	+1
(Malaysia) Ong Yew Sin & Teo Ee Yi	10	7	3	+4
(Russia) Vladimir Ivanov & Ivan Sozonov	1	0	1	–1
(South Korea) Kang Min-hyuk & Seo Seung-jae	5	2	3	–1 (Note: Tournament Software did not include the results of men's team event of the 2022 Asian Games for head-to-head (Chia and Soh won against Kang and Seo 21–17, 21–9).)
(South Korea) Kim Gi-jung & Kim Sa-rang	2	2	0	+2
(South Korea) Kim Won-ho & Seo Seung-jae	2	1	1	0
(South Korea) Ko Sung-hyun & Shin Baek-cheol	1	0	1	–1
(Thailand) Bodin Isara & Maneepong Jongjit	2	1	1	0
(Thailand) Supak Jomkoh & Kittinupong Kedren	3	3	0	+2
