= Musashino Forest Sport Plaza =

Multi-sport venue located in Tokyo, Japan

Coordinates: 35.6660398°N 139.5224072°E

Musashino Forest Sport Plaza Keio Arena Tokyo
- 武蔵野の森総合スポーツプラザ
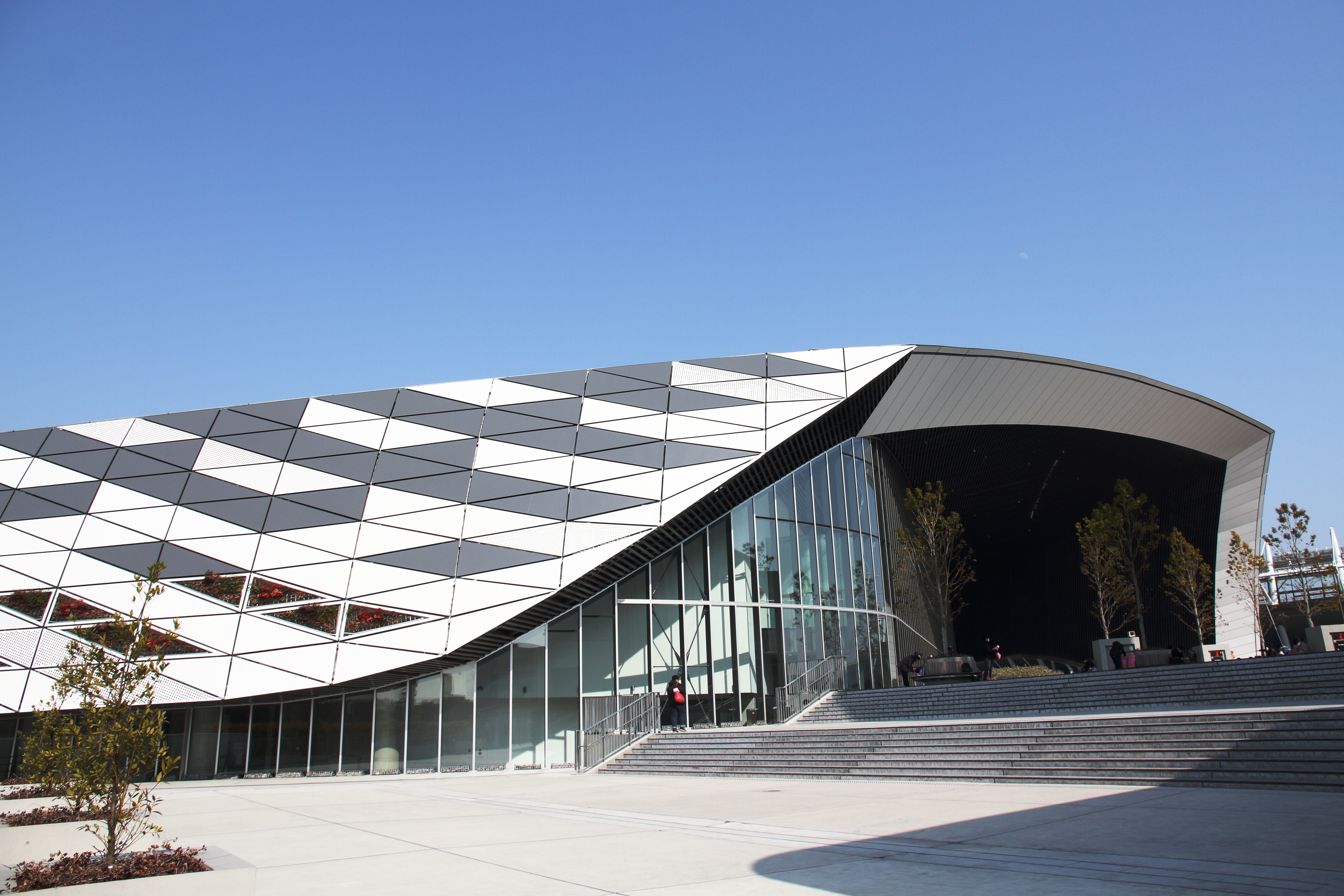
- The plaza in 2018
- Interactive map of Musashino Forest Sport Plaza; Keio Arena Tokyo
- Location: Chōfu, Tokyo, Japan
- Capacity: Over 10,000

Construction
- Opened: 25 November 2017; 8 years ago
- Construction cost: Over $300 million

The Musashino Forest Sport Plaza (武蔵野の森総合スポーツプラザ, Musashino no Mori Sōgō Supōtsu Puraza), currently known as Keio Arena Tokyo (京王アリーナTOKYO) for sponsorship reasons, is a multi-sport venue located in Chōfu, Tokyo, Japan.

The main arena has a seating capacity of over 10,000, and also includes a swimming pool, a gym, a multi-use sports area and two fitness studios, that is available for use by the general public. It is the first new venue completed for Tokyo 2020. Construction took three and a half years and cost over $300 million to complete.

On February 14, 2025, Keio Corporation signed a 3-year naming rights for the venue until March 2028, and changed the name to Keio Arena Tokyo on May 1.

== Events ==
In October 2018, the venue hosted the Japan Open Tennis Championships as the Ariake Coliseum was renovated for the tennis events at the 2020 Summer Olympics. It was used for staging the 2020 Summer Olympics badminton tournaments and hosted the badminton, wheelchair fencing and wheelchair basketball competitions for the 2020 Summer Paralympics.

== See also ==
- List of indoor arenas in Japan
