= 2022 Denmark Open =

Tournament details
- Dates: 18–23 October
- Level: Super 750
- Total prize money: US$750,000
- Venue: Arena Fyn
- Location: Odense, Denmark

Champions
- Men's singles: (China) Shi Yuqi
- Women's singles: (China) He Bingjiao
- Men's doubles: (Indonesia) Fajar Alfian (Indonesia) Muhammad Rian Ardianto
- Women's doubles: (China) Chen Qingchen (China) Jia Yifan
- Mixed doubles: (China) Zheng Siwei (China) Huang Yaqiong

The 2022 Denmark Open (officially known as the Denmark Open 2022 presented by VICTOR for sponsorship reasons) was a badminton tournament which took place at the Arena Fyn in Odense, Denmark, from 18 to 23 October 2022 and had a total prize of US$750,000.

The host country Denmark failed to send any representatives in the tournament's semi-finals for the first time ever.

== Tournament ==
The 2022 Denmark Open was the seventeenth tournament according to the 2022 BWF World Tour. It was a part of the Denmark Open, which had been held since 1935. This tournament was organized by Badminton Denmark with sanction from the BWF.

During the medal ceremony for the men's doubles final, the announcer mistakenly introduced both Indonesian pairs, champions Fajar Alfian and Muhammad Rian Ardianto and runners-up Marcus Fernaldi Gideon and Kevin Sanjaya Sukamuljo, as representing Malaysia. Badminton Denmark subsequently apologized for the error, describing it as a human mistake.

=== Venue ===
This international tournament was held at the Arena Fyn in Odense, Denmark.

=== Point distribution ===
Below is the point distribution table for each phase of the tournament based on the BWF points system for the BWF World Tour Super 750 event.

Winner	Runner-up	3/4	5/8	9/16	17/32
11,000	9,350	7,700	6,050	4,320	2,660

=== Prize money ===
The total prize money for this tournament was US$750,000. Distribution of prize money was in accordance with BWF regulations.

Event	Winner	Finals	Semi-finals	Quarter-finals	Last 16	Last 32
Singles	$52,500	$25,500	$10,500	$4,125	$2,250	$750
Doubles	$55,500	$26,250	$10,500	$4,687.5	$2,437.5	$750

== Men's singles ==
=== Seeds ===
1. (Denmark) Viktor Axelsen (quarter-finals)
2. (Japan) Kento Momota (withdrew)
3. (Denmark) Anders Antonsen (withdrew)
4. (Malaysia) Lee Zii Jia (final)
5. (Chinese Taipei) Chou Tien-chen (quarter-finals)
6. (Indonesia) Anthony Sinisuka Ginting (first round)
7. (Singapore) Loh Kean Yew (semi-finals)
8. (Indonesia) Jonatan Christie (quarter-finals)

=== Finals ===
Semi-finals
7	(Singapore) Loh Kean Yew	18	15
4	(Malaysia) Lee Zii Jia	21	21
(China) Shi Yuqi	21	9	24
(Japan) Kodai Naraoka	15	21	22

Final
4	(Malaysia) Lee Zii Jia	18	21	12
(China) Shi Yuqi	21	16	21

=== Top half ===
==== Section 1 ====
First round
1	(Denmark) V Axelsen	21	21
(Thailand) K Vitidsarn	16	8
(Japan) K Nishimoto	18	14
(Denmark) R Gemke	21	21
7	(Singapore) Loh K Y	21	22
(Thailand) S Thammasin	13	20
(Hong Kong) Ng K L	21	14	12
(India) S Kidambi	17	21	21

Second round
1	(Denmark) V Axelsen	21	21
(Denmark) R Gemke	15	19
7	(Singapore) Loh K Y	21	21
(India) S Kidambi	13	15

Quarter-finals
1	(Denmark) V Axelsen	17	10
7	(Singapore) Loh K Y	21	21

==== Section 2 ====
First round
4	(Malaysia) Lee Z J	21	21
(Netherlands) M Caljouw	15	10
(Indonesia) C A Dwi Wardoyo	13	21	18
(Japan) K Tsuneyama	21	16	21
8	(Indonesia) J Christie	21	19	21
(Denmark) H-K Vittinghus	8	21	18
(Republic of Ireland) N Nguyen	18	16
(Hong Kong) Lee C Y	21	21

Second round
4	(Malaysia) Lee Z J	21	21
(Japan) K Tsuneyama	5	19
8	(Indonesia) J Christie	17	21	21
(Hong Kong) Lee C Y	21	9	19

Quarter-finals
4	(Malaysia) Lee Z J	21	18	21
8	(Indonesia) J Christie	16	21	18

=== Bottom half ===
==== Section 3 ====
First round
(Malaysia) Liew D	16	18
(Chinese Taipei) Wang T-w	21	21
(Thailand) K Wangcharoen	12	17
5	(Chinese Taipei) Chou T-c	21	21
(Canada) B Yang	21	21
(Indonesia) S H Rhustavito	16	18
(China) Shi YQ	w	/	o
3	(Denmark) A Antonsen

Second round
(Chinese Taipei) Wang T-w	21	17	10
5	(Chinese Taipei) Chou T-c	13	21	21
(Canada) B Yang	20	18
(China) Shi YQ	22	21

Quarter-finals
5	(Chinese Taipei) Chou T-c	23	12
(China) Shi YQ	25	21

==== Section 4 ====
First round
(China) Zhao JP	13	20
(India) Prannoy H. S.	21	22
(India) L Sen	21	21
6	(Indonesia) A S Ginting	16	12
(France) T J Popov	12	15
(Japan) K Naraoka	21	21
(China) Lu GZ	21	26
PFR	(China) Li SF	11	24

Second round
(India) Prannoy H. S.	9	18
(India) L Sen	21	21
(Japan) K Naraoka	21	21
(China) Lu GZ	11	18

Quarter-finals
(India) L Sen	17	12
(Japan) K Naraoka	21	21

== Women's singles ==
=== Seeds ===
1. (Japan) Akane Yamaguchi (quarter-finals)
2. (Chinese Taipei) Tai Tzu-ying (quarter-finals)
3. (China) Chen Yufei (final)
4. (Spain) Carolina Marín (second round)
5. (Thailand) Ratchanok Intanon (semi-finals)
6. (Japan) Nozomi Okuhara (second round)
7. (Thailand) Pornpawee Chochuwong (quarter-finals)
8. (China) He Bingjiao (champion)

=== Finals ===
Semi-finals
8	(China) He Bingjiao	21	21
(China) Han Yue	14	12
3	(China) Chen Yufei	15	21	21
5	(Thailand) Ratchanok Intanon	21	10	15

Final
8	(China) He Bingjiao	22	12	21
3	(China) Chen Yufei	20	21	10

=== Top half ===
==== Section 1 ====
First round
1	(Japan) A Yamaguchi	21	21
(Denmark) L Kjærsfeldt	11	10
(United States) I Wang	13	12
(China) Wang ZY	21	21
8	(China) He BJ	21	21
(Indonesia) G M Tunjung	14	19
(Thailand) L Chaiwan	19	21	12
(Chinese Taipei) Hsu W-c	21	18	21

Second round
1	(Japan) A Yamaguchi	21	20	25
(China) Wang ZY	14	22	23
8	(China) He BJ	16	21	21
(Chinese Taipei) Hsu W-c	21	14	10

Quarter-finals
1	(Japan) A Yamaguchi	21	19	11
8	(China) He BJ	14	21	21

==== Section 2 ====
First round
4	(Spain) C Marín	21	21
(Denmark) M Blichfeldt	18	14
(China) Han Y	21	21
(South Korea) Kim G-e	18	17
6	(Japan) N Okuhara	21	21
(Belgium) L Tan	17	10
(Chinese Taipei) Pai Y-p	12	21	21
(Denmark) L Christophersen	21	12	11

Second round
4	(Spain) C Marín	15	20
(China) Han Y	21	22
6	(Japan) N Okuhara	11	19
(Chinese Taipei) Pai Y-p	21	21

Quarter-finals
(China) Han Y	21	16	21
(Chinese Taipei) Pai Y-p	17	21	16

=== Bottom half ===
==== Section 3 ====
First round
(Denmark) J D Jakobsen	18	20
(Germany) Y Li	21	22
(United States) BW Zhang
7	(Thailand) P Chochuwong	w	/	o
(Canada) M Li	21	21
PFR	(Spain) C Azurmendi	16	6
(Thailand) S Katethong	12	12
3	(China) Chen YF	21	21

Second round
(Germany) Y Li	11	4
7	(Thailand) P Chochuwong	21	21
(Canada) M Li	11	11
3	(China) Chen YF	21	21

Quarter-finals
7	(Thailand) P Chochuwong	17	19
3	(China) Chen YF	21	21

==== Section 4 ====
First round
(China) Zhang YM	21	19	21
(India) S Nehwal	17	21	11
(Scotland) K Gilmour	14	12
5	(Thailand) R Intanon	21	21
(Singapore) Yeo J M	5	13
(Japan) A Ohori	21	21
(Thailand) B Ongbamrungphan	16	15
2	(Chinese Taipei) Tai T-y	21	21

Second round
(China) Zhang YM	18	12
5	(Thailand) R Intanon	21	21
(Japan) A Ohori	18	16
2	(Chinese Taipei) Tai T-y	21	21

Quarter-finals
5	(Thailand) R Intanon	10	22	21
2	(Chinese Taipei) Tai T-y	21	20	16

== Men's doubles ==
=== Seeds ===
1. (Japan) Takuro Hoki / Yugo Kobayashi (first round)
2. (Indonesia) Marcus Fernaldi Gideon / Kevin Sanjaya Sukamuljo (final)
3. (Indonesia) Mohammad Ahsan / Hendra Setiawan (second round)
4. (Malaysia) Aaron Chia / Soh Wooi Yik (semi-finals)
5. (Indonesia) Fajar Alfian / Muhammad Rian Ardianto (champions)
6. (Denmark) Kim Astrup / Anders Skaarup Rasmussen (first round)
7. (India) Satwiksairaj Rankireddy / Chirag Shetty (quarter-finals)
8. (Malaysia) Ong Yew Sin / Teo Ee Yi (semi-finals)

=== Finals ===
Semi-finals
8	(Malaysia) Ong Yew Sin (Malaysia) Teo Ee Yi	16	20
5	(Indonesia) Fajar Alfian (Indonesia) Muhammad Rian Ardianto	21	22
4	(Malaysia) Aaron Chia (Malaysia) Soh Wooi Yik	17	21	17
2	(Indonesia) Marcus Fernaldi Gideon (Indonesia) Kevin Sanjaya Sukamuljo	21	13	21

Final
5	(Indonesia) Fajar Alfian (Indonesia) Muhammad Rian Ardianto	21	28
2	(Indonesia) Marcus Fernaldi Gideon (Indonesia) Kevin Sanjaya Sukamuljo	19	26

=== Top half ===
==== Section 1 ====
First round
1	(Japan) T Hoki (Japan) Y Kobayashi	15	14
(Denmark) J Bay (Denmark) L Mølhede	21	21
(Chinese Taipei) Lee Y (Chinese Taipei) Lu C	21	21
(Malaysia) Goh S F (Malaysia) N Izzuddin	18	14
8	(Malaysia) Ong Y S (Malaysia) Teo E Y	21	22
(China) Liang WK (China) Wang C	18	20
(China) Liu YC (China) Ou XY	21	14	21
(Thailand) S Jomkoh (Thailand) K Kedren	16	21	16

Second round
(Denmark) J Bay (Denmark) L Mølhede	28	16	17
(Chinese Taipei) Lee Y (Chinese Taipei) Lu C	26	21	21
8	(Malaysia) Ong Y S (Malaysia) Teo E Y	21	21
(China) Liu YC (China) Ou XY	17	16

Quarter-finals
(Chinese Taipei) Lee Y (Chinese Taipei) Lu C	21	19	13
8	(Malaysia) Ong Y S (Malaysia) Teo E Y	18	21	21

==== Section 2 ====
First round
3	(Indonesia) M Ahsan (Indonesia) H Setiawan	21	21
(Chinese Taipei) Lee J-h (Chinese Taipei) Yang P-hs	16	15
(England) B Lane (England) S Vendy	11	14
(Chinese Taipei) Lu C-y (Chinese Taipei) Yang P-ha	21	21
5	(Indonesia) F Alfian (Indonesia) M R Ardianto	21	19	21
(Netherlands) R Jille (Netherlands) T van der Lecq	6	21	8
(South Korea) Choi S-g (South Korea) Kim W-h	21	19	21
(Malaysia) Tan K M (Malaysia) Tan W K	13	21	13

Second round
3	(Indonesia) M Ahsan (Indonesia) H Setiawan	19	17
(Chinese Taipei) Lu C-y (Chinese Taipei) Yang P-ha	21	21
5	(Indonesia) F Alfian (Indonesia) M R Ardianto	21	21
(South Korea) Choi S-g (South Korea) Kim W-h	17	17

Quarter-finals
(Chinese Taipei) Lu C-y (Chinese Taipei) Yang P-ha	12	15
5	(Indonesia) F Alfian (Indonesia) M R Ardianto	21	21

=== Bottom half ===
==== Section 3 ====
First round
(Malaysia) Man W C (Malaysia) Tee K W	20	15
(Indonesia) M S Fikri (Indonesia) B Maulana	22	21
(South Korea) Kang M-h (South Korea) Seo S-j	15	19
7	(India) S Rankireddy (India) C Shetty	21	21
(France) L Corvée (France) R Labar	18	21	23
(Scotland) C Grimley (Scotland) M Grimley	21	14	21
(Germany) M Lamsfuß (Germany) M Seidel	18	19
4	(Malaysia) A Chia (Malaysia) Soh W Y	21	21

Second round
(Indonesia) M S Fikri (Indonesia) B Maulana	14	16
7	(India) S Rankireddy (India) C Shetty	21	21
(France) L Corvée (France) R Labar	13	18
4	(Malaysia) A Chia (Malaysia) Soh W Y	21	21

Quarter-finals
7	(India) S Rankireddy (India) C Shetty	16	19
4	(Malaysia) A Chia (Malaysia) Soh W Y	21	21

==== Section 4 ====
First round
(France) C Popov (France) T J Popov	19	20
(Denmark) D Lundgaard (Denmark) M Thyrri	21	22
(Indonesia) L R Carnando (Indonesia) D Marthin	21	17	21
6	(Denmark) K Astrup (Denmark) A S Rasmussen	19	21	16
(Scotland) A Dunn (Scotland) A Hall	21	15	21
(Japan) K Matsui (Japan) Y Takeuchi	14	21	18
(Japan) A Koga (Japan) T Saito	17	15
2	(Indonesia) M F Gideon (Indonesia) K S Sukamuljo	21	21

Second round
(Denmark) D Lundgaard (Denmark) M Thyrri	20	14
(Indonesia) L R Carnando (Indonesia) D Marthin	22	21
(Scotland) A Dunn (Scotland) A Hall	14	9
2	(Indonesia) M F Gideon (Indonesia) K S Sukamuljo	21	21

Quarter-finals
(Indonesia) L R Carnando (Indonesia) D Marthin	21	20	20
2	(Indonesia) M F Gideon (Indonesia) K S Sukamuljo	15	22	22

== Women's doubles ==
=== Seeds ===
1. (China) Chen Qingchen / Jia Yifan (champions)
2. (South Korea) Kim So-yeong / Kong Hee-yong (quarter-finals)
3. (Japan) Nami Matsuyama / Chiharu Shida (semi-finals)
4. (Japan) Yuki Fukushima / Sayaka Hirota (quarter-finals)
5. (Japan) Mayu Matsumoto / Wakana Nagahara (first round)
6. (Thailand) Jongkolphan Kititharakul / Rawinda Prajongjai (semi-finals)
7. (Indonesia) Apriyani Rahayu / Siti Fadia Silva Ramadhanti (quarter-finals)
8. (South Korea) Jeong Na-eun / Kim Hye-jeong (first round)

=== Finals ===
Semi-finals
1	(China) Chen Qingchen (China) Jia Yifan	21	21
6	(Thailand) Jongkolphan Kititharakul (Thailand) Rawinda Prajongjai	17	15
3	(Japan) Nami Matsuyama (Japan) Chiharu Shida	21	18	14
(South Korea) Baek Ha-na (South Korea) Lee So-hee	15	21	21

Final
1	(China) Chen Qingchen (China) Jia Yifan	21	21
(South Korea) Baek Ha-na (South Korea) Lee So-hee	12	15

=== Top half ===
==== Section 1 ====
First round
1	(China) Chen QC (China) Jia YF	21	21
(Hong Kong) Yeung N T (Hong Kong) Yeung P L	7	17
(Thailand) S Paewsampran (Thailand) P Supajirakul	16	14
(Malaysia) P Tan (Malaysia) Thinaah M	21	21
8	(South Korea) Jeong N-e (South Korea) Kim H-j	16	17
(Thailand) B Aimsaard (Thailand) N Aimsaard	21	21
(Bulgaria) G Stoeva (Bulgaria) S Stoeva	16	11
(China) Zhang SX (China) Zheng Y	21	21

Second round
1	(China) Chen QC (China) Jia YF	21	20	21
(Malaysia) P Tan (Malaysia) Thinaah M	18	22	17
(Thailand) B Aimsaard (Thailand) N Aimsaard	11	13
(China) Zhang SX (China) Zheng Y	21	21

Quarter-finals
1	(China) Chen QC (China) Jia YF	21	22
(China) Zhang SX (China) Zheng Y	15	20

==== Section 2 ====
First round
4	(Japan) Y Fukushima (Japan) S Hirota	21	20	21
(Germany) L Efler (Germany) I Lohau	14	22	9
PFR	(Ukraine) M Stoliarenko (Ukraine) Y Zharka	14	8
(South Korea) Lee Y-l (South Korea) Shin S-c	21	21
6	(Thailand) J Kititharakul (Thailand) R Prajongjai	21	21
(China) Liu XX (China) Xia YT	15	14
(India) T Jolly (India) G Gopichand Pullela	21	21
(Denmark) A Bøje (Denmark) A Magelund	15	15

Second round
4	(Japan) Y Fukushima (Japan) S Hirota	21	17	21
(South Korea) Lee Y-l (South Korea) Shin S-c	18	21	19
6	(Thailand) J Kititharakul (Thailand) R Prajongjai	23	21
(India) T Jolly (India) G Gopichand Pullela	21	13

Quarter-finals
4	(Japan) Y Fukushima (Japan) S Hirota	18	21	11
6	(Thailand) J Kititharakul (Thailand) R Prajongjai	21	13	21

=== Bottom half ===
==== Section 3 ====
First round
(China) Du Y (China) Li WM	21	21
(France) M Lambert (France) A Tran	16	14
PFR	(Estonia) K-K Marran (Estonia) H Rüütel	16	9
7	(Indonesia) A Rahayu (Indonesia) S F S Ramadhanti	21	21
(Netherlands) D Jille (Netherlands) C Seinen	17	16
(Canada) R Honderich (Canada) K Tsai	21	21
(Denmark) M Fruergaard (Denmark) S Thygesen	10	21	17
3	(Japan) N Matsuyama (Japan) C Shida	21	16	21

Second round
(China) Du Y (China) Li WM	13	1^{r}
7	(Indonesia) A Rahayu (Indonesia) S F S Ramadhanti	21	6
(Canada) R Honderich (Canada) K Tsai	18	21	12
3	(Japan) N Matsuyama (Japan) C Shida	21	17	21

Quarter-finals
7	(Indonesia) A Rahayu (Indonesia) S F S Ramadhanti	21	14	12
3	(Japan) N Matsuyama (Japan) C Shida	17	21	21

==== Section 4 ====
First round
(Malaysia) V Hoo (Malaysia) Lim C S	19	17
(Japan) R Iwanaga (Japan) K Nakanishi	21	21
(South Korea) Baek H-n (South Korea) Lee S-h	21	21	21
5	(Japan) M Matsumoto (Japan) W Nagahara	23	17	11
(Spain) C Azurmendi (Spain) B Corrales	13	15
(Scotland) J MacPherson (Scotland) C Torrance	21	21
(Indonesia) F D Kusuma (Indonesia) A C Pratiwi	13	18
2	(South Korea) Kim S-y (South Korea) Kong H-y	21	21

Second round
(Japan) R Iwanaga (Japan) K Nakanishi	9	17
(South Korea) Baek H-n (South Korea) Lee S-h	21	21
(Scotland) J MacPherson (Scotland) C Torrance	13	7
2	(South Korea) Kim S-y (South Korea) Kong H-y	21	21

Quarter-finals
(South Korea) Baek H-n (South Korea) Lee S-h	16	21	21
2	(South Korea) Kim S-y (South Korea) Kong H-y	21	15	16

== Mixed doubles ==
=== Seeds ===
1. (Thailand) Dechapol Puavaranukroh / Sapsiree Taerattanachai (second round)
2. (Japan) Yuta Watanabe / Arisa Higashino (quarter-finals)
3. (China) Zheng Siwei / Huang Yaqiong (champions)
4. (South Korea) Seo Seung-jae / Chae Yoo-jung (quarter-finals)
5. (Hong Kong) Tang Chun Man / Tse Ying Suet (withdrew)
6. (France) Thom Gicquel / Delphine Delrue (quarter-finals)
7. (Germany) Mark Lamsfuß / Isabel Lohau (second round)
8. (Malaysia) Tan Kian Meng / Lai Pei Jing (second round)

=== Finals ===
Semi-finals
(China) Feng Yanzhe (China) Huang Dongping	21	24
(Thailand) Supak Jomkoh (Thailand) Supissara Paewsampran	9	22
3	(China) Zheng Siwei (China) Huang Yaqiong	21	24
(Malaysia) Goh Soon Huat (Malaysia) Shevon Jemie Lai	16	22

Final
(China) Feng Yanzhe (China) Huang Dongping	19	22	19
3	(China) Zheng Siwei (China) Huang Yaqiong	21	20	21

=== Top half ===
==== Section 1 ====
First round
1	(Thailand) D Puavaranukroh (Thailand) S Taerattanachai	21	21
(Indonesia) Z J Sumanti (Indonesia) H Julimarbela	14	9
(China) Feng YZ (China) Huang DP	21	21
(Malaysia) Chan P S (Malaysia) Cheah Y S	16	17
7	(Germany) M Lamsfuß (Germany) I Lohau	21	21
PFR	(South Korea) Jin Y (South Korea) Shin S-c	11	18
(Germany) J R Jansen (Germany) L Efler	18	15
(Japan) K Yamashita (Japan) N Shinoya	21	21

Second round
1	(Thailand) D Puavaranukroh (Thailand) S Taerattanachai	19	21
(China) Feng YZ (China) Huang DP	21	23
7	(Germany) M Lamsfuß (Germany) I Lohau	18	11
(Japan) K Yamashita (Japan) N Shinoya	21	21

Quarter-finals
(China) Feng YZ (China) Huang DP	21	21
(Japan) K Yamashita (Japan) N Shinoya	9	14

==== Section 2 ====
First round
4	(South Korea) Seo S-j (South Korea) Chae Y-j	21	21
(South Korea) Kim W-h (South Korea) Jeong N-e	18	19
(China) Guo XW (China) Zhang SX	19	21	19
(Hong Kong) Lee C H (Hong Kong) Ng T Y	21	15	21
PFR	(Chinese Taipei) Lee Y (Chinese Taipei) Lin W-c	21	24	13
(Scotland) A Hall (Scotland) J MacPherson	16	26	21
(England) C Hemming (England) J Pugh	17	11
(Thailand) S Jomkoh (Thailand) S Paewsampran	21	21

Second round
4	(South Korea) Seo S-j (South Korea) Chae Y-j	21	21
(Hong Kong) Lee C H (Hong Kong) Ng T Y	13	5
(Scotland) A Hall (Scotland) J MacPherson	14	13
(Thailand) S Jomkoh (Thailand) S Paewsampran	21	21

Quarter-finals
4	(South Korea) Seo S-j (South Korea) Chae Y-j	19	21	18
(Thailand) S Jomkoh (Thailand) S Paewsampran	21	6	21

=== Bottom half ===
==== Section 3 ====
First round
(Japan) Y Kaneko (Japan) M Matsutomo	21	8	21
(Netherlands) R Tabeling (Netherlands) S Piek	15	21	18
(South Korea) Kim Y-h (South Korea) Lee Y-l	13	24	12
6	(France) T Gicquel (France) D Delrue	21	22	21
(Denmark) M Mikkelsen (Denmark) R Søby Hansen	21	22
(Chinese Taipei) Yang P-hs (Chinese Taipei) Hu L-f	19	20
(Indonesia) R N Kusharjanto (Indonesia) L A Kusumawati	11	11
3	(China) Zheng SW (China) Huang YQ	21	21

Second round
(Japan) Y Kaneko (Japan) M Matsutomo	15	21
6	(France) T Gicquel (France) D Delrue	21	23
(Denmark) M Mikkelsen (Denmark) R Søby Hansen	10	21	19
3	(China) Zheng SW (China) Huang YQ	21	19	21

Quarter-finals
6	(France) T Gicquel (France) D Delrue	20	13
3	(China) Zheng SW (China) Huang YQ	22	21

==== Section 4 ====
First round
(Malaysia) Goh S H (Malaysia) S J Lai	21	21
(Chinese Taipei) Lee J-h (Chinese Taipei) Hsu Y-c	18	11
(Denmark) M Christiansen (Denmark) A Bøje	21	13
8	(Malaysia) Tan K M (Malaysia) Lai P J	23	21
(Indonesia) R Rivaldy (Indonesia) P H Mentari	21	17	22
(India) I Bhatnagar (India) T Crasto	9	21	24
PFR	(Netherlands) T van der Lecq (Netherlands) D Jille	18	7
2	(Japan) Y Watanabe (Japan) A Higashino	21	21

Second round
(Malaysia) Goh S H (Malaysia) S J Lai	18	24	22
8	(Malaysia) Tan K M (Malaysia) Lai P J	21	22	20
(India) I Bhatnagar (India) T Crasto	16	10
2	(Japan) Y Watanabe (Japan) A Higashino	21	21

Quarter-finals
(Malaysia) Goh S H (Malaysia) S J Lai	21	21
2	(Japan) Y Watanabe (Japan) A Higashino	18	14

Preceded by 2021 Denmark Open	Denmark Open	Succeeded by 2023 Denmark Open
Preceded by 2022 Indonesia Masters Super 100	BWF World Tour; 2022 BWF season	Succeeded by 2022 French Open
