= Badminton at the 2018 Asian Games – Men's doubles =

Men's doubles at the 2018 Asian Games
- Venue: Istora Gelora Bung Karno
- Dates: 23–28 August
- Competitors: 58 from 15 nations

Medalists
gold medal	Marcus Fernaldi Gideon; Kevin Sanjaya Sukamuljo	Indonesia
silver medal	Fajar Alfian; Muhammad Rian Ardianto	Indonesia
bronze medal	Lee Jhe-huei; Lee Yang	Chinese Taipei
bronze medal	Li Junhui; Liu Yuchen	China

The badminton men's doubles tournament at the 2018 Asian Games in Jakarta took place from 23 to 28 August at Istora Gelora Bung Karno.

The Indonesian duo of Marcus Fernaldi Gideon and Kevin Sanjaya Sukamuljo won the gold in this tournament.

== Schedule ==
All times are Western Indonesia Time (UTC+07:00)

Date	Time	Event
Thursday, 23 August 2018	12:20	Round of 32
Saturday, 25 August 2018	13:00	Round of 16
Sunday, 26 August 2018	14:30	Quarterfinals
Monday, 27 August 2018	12:00	Semifinals
Tuesday, 28 August 2018	14:20	Gold medal match

== Seeds ==
The top four Asian pairs were seeded based on the BWF World Rankings.

1. Marcus Fernaldi Gideon / Kevin Sanjaya Sukamuljo (INA) (champions)
2. Li Junhui / Liu Yuchen (CHN) (semi-finals)
3. Takeshi Kamura / Keigo Sonoda (JPN) (second round)
4. Liu Cheng / Zhang Nan (CHN) (second round)

=== Top half ===
Round of 32
Irfan Saeed Bhatti (PAK); Azeem Sarwar (PAK)	8	16
Takuto Inoue (JPN); Yuki Kaneko (JPN)	21	21
Enkhbatyn Sumiyaasüren (MGL); Gombodorjiin Temüülen (MGL)	12	7
Bikash Shrestha (NEP); Nabin Shrestha (NEP)	21	21
Kittinupong Kedren (THA); Dechapol Puavaranukroh (THA)	15	16
Goh V Shem (MAS); Tan Wee Kiong (MAS)	21	21
Lee Jhe-huei (TPE); Lee Yang (TPE)	21	21
Sarim Mohamed (MDV); Hussein Zayan Shaheed (MDV)	4	7
Dinuka Karunaratne (SRI); Niluka Karunaratne (SRI)	16	17
Choi Sol-gyu (KOR); Kang Min-hyuk (KOR)	21	21
Yonny Chung (HKG); Tam Chun Hei (HKG)	12	14
Satwiksairaj Rankireddy (IND); Chirag Shetty (IND)	21	21

Round of 16
1	Marcus Fernaldi Gideon (INA); Kevin Sanjaya Sukamuljo (INA)	21	19	21
Takuto Inoue (JPN); Yuki Kaneko (JPN)	16	21	18
Bikash Shrestha (NEP); Nabin Shrestha (NEP)	9	12
Goh V Shem (MAS); Tan Wee Kiong (MAS)	21	21
4	Liu Cheng (CHN); Zhang Nan (CHN)	22	16	16
Lee Jhe-huei (TPE); Lee Yang (TPE)	20	21	21
Choi Sol-gyu (KOR); Kang Min-hyuk (KOR)	21	19	21
Satwiksairaj Rankireddy (IND); Chirag Shetty (IND)	17	21	17

Quarterfinals
1	Marcus Fernaldi Gideon (INA); Kevin Sanjaya Sukamuljo (INA)	22	21
Goh V Shem (MAS); Tan Wee Kiong (MAS)	20	19
Lee Jhe-huei (TPE); Lee Yang (TPE)	21	21
Choi Sol-gyu (KOR); Kang Min-hyuk (KOR)	16	16

Semifinals
1	Marcus Fernaldi Gideon (INA); Kevin Sanjaya Sukamuljo (INA)	21	20	21
Lee Jhe-huei (TPE); Lee Yang (TPE)	15	22	12

=== Bottom half ===
Round of 32
Fajar Alfian (INA); Muhammad Rian Ardianto (INA)	21	21
Byambajavyn Khuvituguldur (MGL); Mönkhbatyn Batdavaa (MGL)	4	7
Chen Hung-ling (TPE); Wang Chi-lin (TPE)	12	21	17
Kim Won-ho (KOR); Seo Seung-jae (KOR)	21	15	21
Lee Chun Hei (HKG); Or Chin Chung (HKG)	11	18
Ong Yew Sin (MAS); Teo Ee Yi (MAS)	21	21
Tinn Isriyanet (THA); Kittisak Namdash (THA)	11	16
3	Takeshi Kamura (JPN); Keigo Sonoda (JPN)	21	21
Che Pui Ngai (MAC); Pui Pang Fong (MAC)	11	8
Sachin Dias (SRI); Buwaneka Goonethilleka (SRI)	21	21
Dipesh Dhami (NEP); Ratnajit Tamang (NEP)	19	20
Rizwan Azam (PAK); Sulehri Kashif Ali (PAK)	21	22
Manu Attri (IND); B. Sumeeth Reddy (IND)	21	21
Ahmed Thoif Mohamed (MDV); Mohamed Ajfan Rasheed (MDV)	10	8

Round of 16
Fajar Alfian (INA); Muhammad Rian Ardianto (INA)	21	21
Kim Won-ho (KOR); Seo Seung-jae (KOR)	18	13
Ong Yew Sin (MAS); Teo Ee Yi (MAS)	21	21
3	Takeshi Kamura (JPN); Keigo Sonoda (JPN)	14	17
Sachin Dias (SRI); Buwaneka Goonethilleka (SRI)	21	21
Rizwan Azam (PAK); Sulehri Kashif Ali (PAK)	12	13
Manu Attri (IND); B. Sumeeth Reddy (IND)	13	21	23
2	Li Junhui (CHN); Liu Yuchen (CHN)	21	17	25

Quarterfinals
Fajar Alfian (INA); Muhammad Rian Ardianto (INA)	21	21
Ong Yew Sin (MAS); Teo Ee Yi (MAS)	17	13
Sachin Dias (SRI); Buwaneka Goonethilleka (SRI)	12	15
2	Li Junhui (CHN); Liu Yuchen (CHN)	21	21

Semifinals
Fajar Alfian (INA); Muhammad Rian Ardianto (INA)	21	19	21
2	Li Junhui (CHN); Liu Yuchen (CHN)	14	21	13

== Results ==
=== Final ===
Gold medal match
1	Marcus Fernaldi Gideon (INA); Kevin Sanjaya Sukamuljo (INA)	13	21	24
	Fajar Alfian (INA); Muhammad Rian Ardianto (INA)	21	18	22
