= 2025 Malaysia Open (badminton) =

Badminton tournament in Malaysia

Tournament details
- Dates: 7–12 January
- Edition: 68th
- Level: Super 1000
- Total prize money: US$1,450,000
- Venue: Axiata Arena
- Location: Kuala Lumpur, Malaysia

Champions
- Men's singles: (China) Shi Yuqi
- Women's singles: (South Korea) An Se-young
- Men's doubles: (South Korea) Kim Won-ho (South Korea) Seo Seung-jae
- Women's doubles: (Japan) Yuki Fukushima (Japan) Mayu Matsumoto
- Mixed doubles: (Thailand) Dechapol Puavaranukroh (Thailand) Supissara Paewsampran

The 2025 Malaysia Open (officially known as the Petronas Malaysia Open 2025 for sponsorship reasons) was a badminton tournament which took place at the Axiata Arena, Kuala Lumpur, Malaysia, from 7 to 12 January 2025 and had a total prize of US$1,450,000.

== Tournament ==
The 2025 Malaysia Open was the first tournament of the 2025 BWF World Tour and was part of the Malaysia Open championships, which have been held since 1937. This tournament was organized by the Badminton Association of Malaysia with sanction from the BWF.

=== Venue ===
This tournament was held at the Axiata Arena inside the KL Sports City in Kuala Lumpur, Malaysia.

=== Point distribution ===
Below is the point distribution table for each phase of the tournament based on the BWF points system for the BWF World Tour Super 1000 event.

Winner	Runner-up	3/4	5/8	9/16	17/32
12,000	10,200	8,400	6,600	4,800	3,000

=== Prize pool ===
The total prize money is US$1,450,000 with the distribution of the prize money in accordance with BWF regulations.

Event	Winner	Finalist	Semi-finals	Quarter-finals	Last 16	Last 32
Singles	$101,500	$49,300	$20,300	$7,975	$4,350	$1,450
Doubles	$107,300	$50,750	$20,300	$9,062.50	$4,712.50	$1,450

== Men's singles ==
=== Seeds ===
1. (China) Shi Yuqi (champion)
2. (Denmark) Anders Antonsen (final)
3. (Indonesia) Jonatan Christie (first round)
4. (Denmark) Viktor Axelsen (first round)
5. (Thailand) Kunlavut Vitidsarn (quarter-finals)
6. (Malaysia) Lee Zii Jia (withdrew)
7. (China) Li Shifeng (semi-finals)
8. (Japan) Kodai Naraoka (semi-finals)

=== Finals ===
Semi-finals
1	(China) Shi Yuqi	16	21	21
7	(China) Li Shifeng	21	5	12
8	(Japan) Kodai Naraoka	14	14
2	(Denmark) Anders Antonsen	21	21

Final
1	(China) Shi Yuqi	21	21
2	(Denmark) Anders Antonsen	8	15

=== Top half ===
==== Section 1 ====
First round
1	(China) Shi YQ	21	20	21
(Japan) K Nishimoto	16	22	16
(Malaysia) Leong J H	17	21	13
(China) Lu GZ	21	16	21
SWM	(Chinese Taipei) Chou T-c	21	21
(Chinese Taipei) Su L-y	14	17
(Japan) Y Tanaka	19	21	21
(China) Lei LX	21	16	13

Second round
1	(China) Shi YQ	21	21
(China) Lu GZ	18	16
SWM	(Chinese Taipei) Chou T-c	21	22	21
(Japan) Y Tanaka	9	24	18

Quarter-finals
1	(China) Shi YQ	21	19	21
SWM	(Chinese Taipei) Chou T-c	16	21	17

==== Section 2 ====
First round
4	(Denmark) V Axelsen	17	13
(Hong Kong) Lee C Y	21	21
(India) L Sen	14	7
(Chinese Taipei) Chi Y-j	21	21
7	(China) Li SF	21	21
PFR	(India) P Rajawat	11	16
(Canada) B Yang	12	21	15
(India) Prannoy H. S.	21	17	21

Second round
(Hong Kong) Lee C Y	21	14	12
(Chinese Taipei) Chi Y-j	15	21	21
7	(China) Li SF	21	15	23
(India) Prannoy H. S.	8	21	21

Quarter-finals
(Chinese Taipei) Chi Y-j	21	13	7
7	(China) Li SF	14	21	21

=== Bottom half ===
==== Section 3 ====
First round
(Chinese Taipei) Lin C-y	9	21	21
(Denmark) R Gemke	21	18	7
(France) C Popov	21	9
8	(Japan) K Naraoka	23	21
(Hong Kong) Ng K L	16	21	21
(China) Weng HY	21	19	11
(France) T J Popov	21	14	26
3	(Indonesia) J Christie	8	21	24

Second round
(Chinese Taipei) Lin C-y	14	14
8	(Japan) K Naraoka	21	21
(Hong Kong) Ng K L	23	10	21
(France) T J Popov	21	21	17

Quarter-finals
8	(Japan) K Naraoka	21	21
(Hong Kong) Ng K L	18	15

==== Section 4 ====
First round
(Chinese Taipei) Lee C-h	12	18
(Indonesia) A S Ginting	21	21
(France) A Lanier	11	21	21
5	(Thailand) K Vitidsarn	21	12	23
(Singapore) Loh K Y	13	18
(Japan) K Watanabe	21	21
(Chinese Taipei) Wang T-w	17	10
2	(Denmark) A Antonsen	21	21

Second round
(Indonesia) A S Ginting	7	10
5	(Thailand) K Vitidsarn	21	21
(Japan) K Watanabe	23	18	14
2	(Denmark) A Antonsen	21	21	21

Quarter-finals
5	(Thailand) K Vitidsarn	15	13
2	(Denmark) A Antonsen	21	21

== Women's singles ==
=== Seeds ===
1. (South Korea) An Se-young (champion)
2. (China) Wang Zhiyi (final)
3. (China) Han Yue (quarter-finals)
4. (Indonesia) Gregoria Mariska Tunjung (first round)
5. (Thailand) Busanan Ongbamrungphan (withdrew)
6. (Japan) Tomoka Miyazaki (first round)
7. (Singapore) Yeo Jia Min (quarter-finals)
8. (Thailand) Pornpawee Chochuwong (second round)

=== Finals ===
Semi-finals
1	(South Korea) An Se-young	21	21
(Thailand) Ratchanok Intanon	14	18
(Thailand) Pornpicha Choeikeewong	16	12
2	(China) Wang Zhiyi	21	21

Final
1	(South Korea) An Se-young	21	21
2	(China) Wang Zhiyi	17	7

=== Top half ===
==== Section 1 ====
First round
1	(South Korea) An S-y	21	21
(Denmark) L Christophersen	12	13
(Japan) N Nidaira	16	19
(Vietnam) Nguyễn T L	21	21
6	(Japan) T Miyazaki	21	14	16
(Denmark) M Blichfeldt	15	21	21
(United States) BW Zhang	21	20	21
(Japan) N Okuhara	14	22	14

Second round
1	(South Korea) An S-y	21	21
(Vietnam) Nguyễn T L	15	15
(Denmark) M Blichfeldt	14	18
(United States) BW Zhang	21	21

Quarter-finals
1	(South Korea) An S-y	21	0
(United States) BW Zhang	11	0^{r}

==== Section 2 ====
First round
4	(Indonesia) G M Tunjung	8	14
(Indonesia) P K Wardani	21	21
(India) A Kashyap	14	12
(Denmark) J D Jakobsen	21	21
8	(Thailand) P Chochuwong	21	18	21
(India) A Upadhyaya	17	21	8
(Thailand) R Intanon	21	21
(Hong Kong) Lo S Y	11	6

Second round
(Indonesia) P K Wardani	21	21
(Denmark) J D Jakobsen	16	12
8	(Thailand) P Chochuwong	17	14
(Thailand) R Intanon	21	21

Quarter-finals
(Indonesia) P K Wardani	13	21	16
(Thailand) R Intanon	21	15	21

=== Bottom half ===
==== Section 3 ====
First round
(Thailand) P Choeikeewong	21	15	21
(Japan) K Sugiyama	7	21	17
(Chinese Taipei) Lin H-t	w	/	o
5	(Thailand) B Ongbamrungphan
(Malaysia) Goh J W	15	16
(India) M Bansod	21	21
(Chinese Taipei) Pai Y-p	20	7
3	(China) Han Y	22	21

Second round
(Thailand) P Choeikeewong	19	21	21
(Chinese Taipei) Lin H-t	21	16	17
(India) M Bansod	18	11
3	(China) Han Y	21	21

Quarter-finals
(Thailand) P Choeikeewong	18	21	21
3	(China) Han Y	21	13	19

==== Section 4 ====
First round
(Scotland) K Gilmour	21	19	13
(China) Gao FJ	19	21	21
(Chinese Taipei) Sung S-y	16	13
7	(Singapore) Yeo J M	21	21
(United States) L Lam	11	21	17
(Chinese Taipei) Chiu P-c	21	19	21
(Chinese Taipei) Hsu W-c	9	13
2	(China) Wang ZY	21	21

Second round
(China) Gao FJ	14	10
7	(Singapore) Yeo J M	21	21
(Chinese Taipei) Chiu P-c	17	13
2	(China) Wang ZY	21	21

Quarter-finals
7	(Singapore) Yeo J M	20	16
2	(China) Wang ZY	22	21

== Men's doubles ==
=== Seeds ===
1. (Denmark) Kim Astrup / Anders Skaarup Rasmussen (first round)
2. (China) Liang Weikeng / Wang Chang (second round)
3. (Malaysia) Goh Sze Fei / Nur Izzuddin (first round)
4. (Indonesia) Fajar Alfian / Muhammad Rian Ardianto (first round)
5. (Malaysia) Aaron Chia / Soh Wooi Yik (second round)
6. (China) He Jiting / Ren Xiangyu (first round)
7. (India) Satwiksairaj Rankireddy / Chirag Shetty (semi-finals)
8. (Chinese Taipei) Lee Jhe-huei / Yang Po-hsuan (second round)

=== Finals ===
Semi-finals
(China) Chen Boyang (China) Liu Yi	24	21	21
(Malaysia) Man Wei Chong (Malaysia) Tee Kai Wun	26	16	15
7	(India) Satwiksairaj Rankireddy (India) Chirag Shetty	10	15
(South Korea) Kim Won-ho (South Korea) Seo Seung-jae	21	21

Final
(China) Chen Boyang (China) Liu Yi	21	12	12
(South Korea) Kim Won-ho (South Korea) Seo Seung-jae	19	21	21

=== Top half ===
==== Section 1 ====
First round
1	(Denmark) K Astrup (Denmark) A S Rasmussen	16	21	20
(Chinese Taipei) Chiu H-c (Chinese Taipei) Wang C-l	21	18	22
(China) Chen BY (China) Liu Y	21	17	21
(Thailand) P Sukphun (Thailand) P Teeraratsakul	11	21	18
6	(China) He JT (China) Ren XY	21	21	11
(England) B Lane (England) S Vendy	23	19	21
(Denmark) R Kjær (Denmark) F Søgaard	12^{r}
(Indonesia) S K Gutama (Indonesia) M R P Isfahani	7

Second round
(Chinese Taipei) Chiu H-c (Chinese Taipei) Wang C-l	17	21	15
(China) Chen BY (China) Liu Y	21	16	21
(England) B Lane (England) S Vendy	21	21
(Indonesia) S K Gutama (Indonesia) M R P Isfahani	16	14

Quarter-finals
(China) Chen BY (China) Liu Y	21	21
(England) B Lane (England) S Vendy	17	17

==== Section 2 ====
First round
3	(Malaysia) Goh S F (Malaysia) N Izzuddin	15	21	18
(Denmark) D Lundgaard (Denmark) M Vestergaard	21	9	21
(France) C Popov (France) T J Popov	21	21
(Scotland) C Grimley (Scotland) M Grimley	17	12
8	(Chinese Taipei) Lee J-h (Chinese Taipei) Yang P-hs	21	16	21
(Chinese Taipei) Chiang C-w (Chinese Taipei) Wu H-y	18	21	16
(Malaysia) Man W C (Malaysia) Tee K W	21	21
(Japan) K Mitsuhashi (Japan) H Okamura	12	17

Second round
(Denmark) D Lundgaard (Denmark) M Vestergaard	21	24	13
(France) C Popov (France) T J Popov	7	26	21
8	(Chinese Taipei) Lee J-h (Chinese Taipei) Yang P-hs	15	13
(Malaysia) Man W C (Malaysia) Tee K W	21	21

Quarter-finals
(France) C Popov (France) T J Popov	15	11
(Malaysia) Man W C (Malaysia) Tee K W	21	21

=== Bottom half ===
==== Section 3 ====
First round
(Malaysia) N M Azriyn A (Malaysia) Tan W K	21	12	21
(China) Xie HN (China) Zeng WH	15	21	18
(Chinese Taipei) Lu M-c (Chinese Taipei) Tang K-w	10	21	5
7	(India) S Rankireddy (India) C Shetty	21	16	21
(South Korea) Jin Y (South Korea) Kang M-h	21	21
(Chinese Taipei) Chen Z-r (Chinese Taipei) Lin Y-c	18	14
(Malaysia) Ong Y S (Malaysia) Teo E Y	15	21	21
4	(Indonesia) F Alfian (Indonesia) M R Ardianto	21	17	13

Second round
(Malaysia) N M Azriyn A (Malaysia) Tan W K	15	15
7	(India) S Rankireddy (India) C Shetty	21	21
(South Korea) Jin Y (South Korea) Kang M-h	21	21	18
(Malaysia) Ong Y S (Malaysia) Teo E Y	23	16	21

Quarter-finals
7	(India) S Rankireddy (India) C Shetty	26	21
(Malaysia) Ong Y S (Malaysia) Teo E Y	24	15

==== Section 4 ====
First round
(Chinese Taipei) Liu K-h (Chinese Taipei) Yang P-ha	16	12
(Chinese Taipei) Lee F-c (Chinese Taipei) Lee F-j	21	21
(United States) Chen Z-y (United States) P Smith	15	21	10
5	(Malaysia) A Chia (Malaysia) Soh W Y	21	16	21
(Malaysia) J Arif (Malaysia) Yap R K	17	11
(South Korea) Kim W-h (South Korea) Seo S-j	21	21
(South Korea) Kim G-j (South Korea) Kim S-r	18	18
2	(China) Liang WK (China) Wang C	21	21

Second round
(Chinese Taipei) Lee F-c (Chinese Taipei) Lee F-j	21	21
5	(Malaysia) A Chia (Malaysia) Soh W Y	14	18
(South Korea) Kim W-h (South Korea) Seo S-j	21	21
2	(China) Liang WK (China) Wang C	17	16

Quarter-finals
(Chinese Taipei) Lee F-c (Chinese Taipei) Lee F-j	11	7
(South Korea) Kim W-h (South Korea) Seo S-j	21	21

== Women's doubles ==
=== Seeds ===
1. (China) Liu Shengshu / Tan Ning (semi-finals)
2. (South Korea) Baek Ha-na / Lee So-hee (quarter-finals)
3. (Malaysia) Pearly Tan / Thinaah Muralitharan (first round)
4. (China) Li Yijing / Luo Xumin (semi-finals)
5. (Indonesia) Febriana Dwipuji Kusuma / Amallia Cahaya Pratiwi (first round)
6. (India) Treesa Jolly / Gayatri Gopichand (second round)
7. (Hong Kong) Yeung Nga Ting / Yeung Pui Lam (first round)
8. (India) Tanisha Crasto / Ashwini Ponnappa (first round)

=== Finals ===
Semi-finals
1	(China) Liu Shengshu (China) Tan Ning	21	16	17
PFR	(China) Jia Yifan (China) Zhang Shuxian	19	21	21
4	(China) Li Yijing (China) Luo Xumin	13	21
(Japan) Yuki Fukushima (Japan) Mayu Matsumoto	21	23

Final
PFR	(China) Jia Yifan (China) Zhang Shuxian	21	15	15
(Japan) Yuki Fukushima (Japan) Mayu Matsumoto	17	21	21

=== Top half ===
==== Section 1 ====
First round
1	(China) Liu SS (China) Tan N	21	21
(Denmark) J Finne-Ipsen (Denmark) M Surrow	10	10
(Malaysia) V Hoo (Malaysia) Lim C S	21	21
(Chinese Taipei) Cheng Y-p (Chinese Taipei) Sun Y-h	11	17
5	(Indonesia) F D Kusuma (Indonesia) A C Pratiwi	14	14
(Chinese Taipei) Hsieh P-s (Chinese Taipei) Hung E-t	21	21
(Chinese Taipei) Chang C-h (Chinese Taipei) Yang C-t	21	17	21
(Ukraine) P Buhrova (Ukraine) Y Kantemyr	19	21	11

Second round
1	(China) Liu SS (China) Tan N	21	21
(Malaysia) V Hoo (Malaysia) Lim C S	6	5
(Chinese Taipei) Hsieh P-s (Chinese Taipei) Hung E-t	20	21	21
(Chinese Taipei) Chang C-h (Chinese Taipei) Yang C-t	22	14	17

Quarter-finals
1	(China) Liu SS (China) Tan N	21	21
(Chinese Taipei) Hsieh P-s (Chinese Taipei) Hung E-t	11	8

==== Section 2 ====
First round
3	(Malaysia) P Tan (Malaysia) Thinaah M	21	14	13
(Indonesia) L T Mayasari (Indonesia) S F S Ramadhanti	19	21	21
(Chinese Taipei) Teng C-h (Chinese Taipei) Yang C-y	17	10
(Chinese Taipei) Hsu Y-h (Chinese Taipei) Lin J-y	21	21
6	(India) T Jolly (India) G Gopichand	21	21
(Thailand) O Jongsathapornparn (Thailand) S Suwachai	10	10
PFR	(China) Jia YF (China) Zhang SX	21	21
(Malaysia) Go P K (Malaysia) Teoh M X	17	10

Second round
(Indonesia) L T Mayasari (Indonesia) S F S Ramadhanti	17	22	21
(Chinese Taipei) Hsu Y-h (Chinese Taipei) Lin J-y	21	20	18
6	(India) T Jolly (India) G Gopichand	21	18	19
PFR	(China) Jia YF (China) Zhang SX	15	21	21

Quarter-finals
(Indonesia) L T Mayasari (Indonesia) S F S Ramadhanti	12	11
PFR	(China) Jia YF (China) Zhang SX	21	21

=== Bottom half ===
==== Section 3 ====
First round
(Malaysia) Ong X Y (Malaysia) C Ting	15	15
(Chinese Taipei) Sung S-y (Chinese Taipei) Yu C-h	21	21
(Japan) M Matsutomo (Japan) C Shida	23	21
8	(India) T Crasto (India) A Ponnappa	21	12
(India) R Panda (India) S Panda	17	10
(Thailand) B Aimsaard (Thailand) N Aimsaard	21	21
(Hong Kong) Fan K Y (Hong Kong) Yau M Y	14	14
4	(China) Li YJ (China) Luo XM	21	21

Second round
(Chinese Taipei) Sung S-y (Chinese Taipei) Yu C-h	16	13
(Japan) M Matsutomo (Japan) C Shida	21	21
(Thailand) B Aimsaard (Thailand) N Aimsaard	21	16	7
4	(China) Li YJ (China) Luo XM	11	21	21

Quarter-finals
(Japan) M Matsutomo (Japan) C Shida	16	16
4	(China) Li YJ (China) Luo XM	21	21

==== Section 4 ====
First round
(Japan) Y Fukushima (Japan) M Matsumoto	21	21
(Scotland) J MacPherson (Scotland) C Torrance	16	17
(South Korea) Kim H-j (South Korea) Kong H-y	21	21
7	(Hong Kong) Yeung N T (Hong Kong) Yeung P L	12	9
(Australia) S Mapasa (Denmark) S Thygesen	21	18^{r}
(Chinese Taipei) Hu L-f (Chinese Taipei) Jheng Y-c	14	17
PFR	(Poland) P Hankiewicz (Poland) K Marczak	9	6
2	(South Korea) Baek H-n (South Korea) Lee S-h	21	21

Second round
(Japan) Y Fukushima (Japan) M Matsumoto	21	21
(South Korea) Kim H-j (South Korea) Kong H-y	19	17
(Chinese Taipei) Hu L-f (Chinese Taipei) Jheng Y-c	14	10
2	(South Korea) Baek H-n (South Korea) Lee S-h	21	21

Quarter-finals
(Japan) Y Fukushima (Japan) M Matsumoto	21	21
2	(South Korea) Baek H-n (South Korea) Lee S-h	14	18

== Mixed doubles ==
=== Seeds ===
1. (China) Feng Yanzhe / Huang Dongping (final)
2. (China) Jiang Zhenbang / Wei Yaxin (second round)
3. (Malaysia) Chen Tang Jie / Toh Ee Wei (semi-finals)
4. (Malaysia) Goh Soon Huat / Shevon Jemie Lai (semi-finals)
5. (Indonesia) Dejan Ferdinansyah / Gloria Emanuelle Widjaja (second round)
6. (Chinese Taipei) Yang Po-hsuan / Hu Ling-fang (quarter-finals)
7. (China) Cheng Xing / Zhang Chi (quarter-finals)
8. (China) Guo Xinwa / Chen Fanghui (second round)

=== Finals ===
Semi-finals
1	(China) Feng Yanzhe (China) Huang Dongping	21	21
3	(Malaysia) Chen Tang Jie (Malaysia) Toh Ee Wei	19	14
4	(Malaysia) Goh Soon Huat (Malaysia) Shevon Jemie Lai	21	12	16
(Thailand) Dechapol Puavaranukroh (Thailand) Supissara Paewsampran	17	21	21

Final
1	(China) Feng Yanzhe (China) Huang Dongping	13	21	18
(Thailand) Dechapol Puavaranukroh (Thailand) Supissara Paewsampran	21	19	21

=== Top half ===
==== Section 1 ====
First round
1	(China) Feng YZ (China) Huang DP	21	21
(England) G Mairs (England) J Mairs	17	12
(Singapore) T Hee (Singapore) Jin YJ	17	15
(Scotland) A Dunn (Scotland) J MacPherson	21	21
6	(Chinese Taipei) Yang P-h (Chinese Taipei) Hu L-f	21	22	21
(Hong Kong) Tang C M (Hong Kong) Ng T Y	18	24	17
(Ukraine) O Titov (Ukraine) Y Kantemyr	21	11	6
(England) C Hemming (England) E van Leeuwen	15	21	21

Second round
1	(China) Feng YZ (China) Huang DP	21	21
(Scotland) A Dunn (Scotland) J MacPherson	11	10
6	(Chinese Taipei) Yang P-h (Chinese Taipei) Hu L-f	16	21	24
(England) C Hemming (England) E van Leeuwen	21	9	22

Quarter-finals
1	(China) Feng YZ (China) Huang DP	21	21
6	(Chinese Taipei) Yang P-h (Chinese Taipei) Hu L-f	19	14

==== Section 2 ====
First round
3	(Malaysia) Chen T J (Malaysia) Toh E W	21	21
(Chinese Taipei) Wu H-y (Chinese Taipei) Yang C-y	8	9
(Malaysia) Hoo P R (Malaysia) Cheng S Y	26	21	22
(Chinese Taipei) Lu M-c (Chinese Taipei) Hung E-t	28	14	24
5	(Indonesia) D Ferdinansyah (Indonesia) G E Widjaja	21	21
(Malaysia) Wong T C (Malaysia) Lim C S	12	13
(Japan) H Midorikawa (Japan) N Saito	22	21
(Malaysia) Tan K M (Malaysia) Lai P J	20	10

Second round
3	(Malaysia) Chen T J (Malaysia) Toh E W	21	21
(Chinese Taipei) Lu M-c (Chinese Taipei) Hung E-t	8	14
5	(Indonesia) D Ferdinansyah (Indonesia) G E Widjaja	17	17
(Japan) H Midorikawa (Japan) N Saito	21	21

Quarter-finals
3	(Malaysia) Chen T J (Malaysia) Toh E W	21	21
(Japan) H Midorikawa (Japan) N Saito	11	18

=== Bottom half ===
==== Section 3 ====
First round
(South Korea) Ko S-h (South Korea) Eom H-w	13	14
(India) D Kapila (India) T Crasto	21	21
(Netherlands) R Tabeling (Denmark) A Bøje	8	12
7	(China) Cheng X (China) Zhang C	21	21
(India) S Karunakaran (India) A Variyath	21	21
(India) A Surya (India) A Pramuthesh	13	15
(United States) P Smith (United States) J Gai	15	19
4	(Malaysia) Goh S H (Malaysia) S J Lai	21	21

Second round
(India) D Kapila (India) T Crasto	13	20
7	(China) Cheng X (China) Zhang C	21	22
(India) S Karunakaran (India) A Variyath	10	17
4	(Malaysia) Goh S H (Malaysia) S J Lai	21	21

Quarter-finals
7	(China) Cheng X (China) Zhang C	15	20
4	(Malaysia) Goh S H (Malaysia) S J Lai	21	22

==== Section 4 ====
First round
(Denmark) M Vestergaard (Denmark) C Busch	9	12
(France) T Gicquel (France) D Delrue	21	21
(Chinese Taipei) Chen C-k (Chinese Taipei) Hsu Y-h	13	16
8	(China) Guo XW (China) Chen FH	21	21
(Chinese Taipei) Ye H-w (Chinese Taipei) N G Chan	12	14
(Thailand) D Puavaranukroh (Thailand) S Paewsampran	21	21
(Thailand) R Oupthong (Thailand) J Sudjaipraparat	21	8	21
2	(China) Jiang ZB (China) Wei YX	18	21	23

Second round
(France) T Gicquel (France) D Delrue	18	21	22
8	(China) Guo XW (China) Chen FH	21	12	20
(Thailand) D Puavaranukroh (Thailand) S Paewsampran	21	21
2	(China) Jiang ZB (China) Wei YX	14	19

Quarter-finals
(France) T Gicquel (France) D Delrue	12	21	7
(Thailand) D Puavaranukroh (Thailand) S Paewsampran	21	14	21

Preceded by 2024 BWF World Tour Finals; 2024 Odisha Masters	BWF World Tour; 2025 BWF season	Succeeded by 2025 India Open
