= Fajar Alfian =

Indonesian badminton player

Personal information
- Born: 7 March 1995 (age 31) Bandung, West Java, Indonesia
- Height: 1.76 m (5 ft 9 in)
- Weight: 69 kg (152 lb)
- Spouse: Firly Assyifa Camilien (m. 2025)

Sport
- Country: Indonesia
- Sport: Badminton
- Handedness: Right
- Coached by: Aryono Miranat; Herry Iman Pierngadi

Men's doubles
- Highest ranking: 1 (with Muhammad Rian Ardianto, 27 December 2022); 2 (with Muhammad Shohibul Fikri, 2 June 2026)
- Current ranking: 2 (with Muhammad Shohibul Fikri, 10 November 2026)
- BWF profile
Medal record
Men's badminton
Representing Indonesia
World Championships
Bronze medal – third place	2019 Basel	Men's doubles
Bronze medal – third place	2022 Tokyo	Men's doubles
Sudirman Cup
Bronze medal – third place	2025 Xiamen	Mixed team
Thomas Cup
Gold medal – first place	2020 Aarhus	Men's team
Silver medal – second place	2022 Bangkok	Men's team
Silver medal – second place	2024 Chengdu	Men's team
Bronze medal – third place	2018 Bangkok	Men's team
Asian Games
Gold medal – first place	2026 Aichi–Nagoya	Men's team
Silver medal – second place	2018 Jakarta–Palembang	Men's doubles
Silver medal – second place	2018 Jakarta–Palembang	Men's team
Bronze medal – third place	2026 Aichi–Nagoya	Men's doubles
Asian Championships
Bronze medal – third place	2022 Manila	Men's doubles
Bronze medal – third place	2026 Ningbo	Men's doubles
Asia Mixed Team Championships
Bronze medal – third place	2019 Hong Kong	Mixed team
Asia Team Championships
Gold medal – first place	2020 Manila	Men's team
SEA Games
Gold medal – first place	2017 Kuala Lumpur	Men's team
Gold medal – first place	2019 Philippines	Men's team
Bronze medal – third place	2017 Kuala Lumpur	Men's doubles
World Junior Championships
Silver medal – second place	2013 Bangkok	Mixed team
Asian Junior Championships
Bronze medal – third place	2013 Kota Kinabalu	Mixed team

Fajar Alfian (born 7 March 1995) is an Indonesian badminton player affiliated with the SGS PLN Bandung. He won the men's doubles silver medal at the 2018 Asian Games, the bronze medals at the 2017 SEA Games, 2019 and 2022 World Championships. He was part of the Indonesia winning team at the 2020 Thomas Cup and 2026 Asian Games. He reached a career high of world number 1 in the men's doubles with Muhammad Rian Ardianto on 27 December 2022.

== Career ==
Alfian started his partnership with Muhammad Rian Ardianto in July 2014. In the beginning of their career, they have won international tournaments including the Indonesia International in 2014, 2015, and 2016; the Austrian International in 2015; and at the BWF Grand Prix level, the 2016 Chinese Taipei Masters.

Alfian was a member of the Indonesia men's team that won gold medals at the 2017 and 2019 SEA Games. He also played with Ardianto, and clinched the men's doubles bronze at that event in 2017. Alfian and Ardianto competed on the BWF World Tour, and won titles at the 2018 Malaysia Masters and the Syed Modi International; and also the 2019 Swiss and Korea Opens. Together with Ardianto he won a bronze medal in the men's doubles at the 2017 SEA Games, the silver at the 2018 Asian Games, and another bronze at the 2019 BWF World Championships.

In February 2020, Alfian alongside Indonesia men's team won the Asia Team Championships held in Manila. In September–October 2021, Alfian alongside Indonesia team competed at the 2021 Sudirman Cup in Vantaa, Finland. He and Ardianto contribute a point in a tie against Canada. Indonesia team advanced to the knockout stage, but lost in the quarter-finals to Malaysia. In the next tournament, he helped Indonesia team won the World Men's Team Championships, the 2020 Thomas Cup.

=== 2022: World number 1 ===
Alfian and Ardianto kicked off 2022 with a rough start, with early exits at the German Open and the All England. They scored their breakthrough win at the Swiss Open. Afterwards, they won the Indonesia Masters, and Malaysia Masters, and finished as runner-up at Korea Open, Thailand Open, Malaysia Open and Singapore Open. They also won bronze medals at the Asian and World Championships. In October, they won their fourth title of the year at the Denmark Open in a tight battle against compatriots Marcus Fernaldi Gideon and Kevin Sanjaya Sukamuljo. Thanks to their achievements, they qualified for their first ever World Tour Finals. Alfian and Ardianto competed at the World Tour Finals as the first seed, but lost to Liu Yuchen and Ou Xuanyi in the semi-finals. They closed off the 2022 World Tour season with a career high rank of world number 1.

=== 2023 ===
In January, Alfian and Ardianto won their first Super 1000 tournament at the Malaysia Open by defeating Chinese pair Liang Weikeng and Wang Chang. The week after, they bowed out of India Open at the semifinals against Malaysians Aaron Chia and Soh Wooi Yik, leaving Indonesia without any representatives in any finals. At their home tournament Indonesia Masters, they lost in the quarter-finals against fifth seeds Liu Yuchen and Ou Xuanyi.

In February, Alfian was called up to the Indonesian team for the Badminton Asia Mixed Team Championships. He and Ardianto lost at the quarterfinals against Korean scratch pair Kim Won-ho and Na Sung-seung

With the Indonesian federation skipping the German Open, Alfian resumed competition at the All England in March. He and Ardianto won their first ever All England title in an all-Indonesian final against Mohammad Ahsan and Hendra Setiawan. At the Spain Masters they lost in the quarter-finals from unseeded Chinese Taipei player Lee Fang-chih and Lee Fang-jen.

In late April, Alfian competed at the Asian Championships in Dubai, United Arab Emirates, but had to lose in the quarter-finals from 8th seed Malaysian pair Ong Yew Sin and Teo Ee Yi.

In May, Alfian alongside the Indonesian team competed at the 2023 Sudirman Cup in Suzhou, China. He won a match in the group stage, against Supak Jomkoh and Kittinupong Kedren of Thailand. Indonesia advanced to the knockout stage but lost at the quarterfinals against China. In the following week, Alfian competed in the second Asian Tour at the Malaysia Masters. Unfortunately, he lost in the first round from eventual winner Korean pair Kang Min-hyuk and Seo Seung-jae.

In June, Alfian competed at the Singapore Open, but lost in the first round from English pair Ben Lane and Sean Vendy. In the next tour, they competed at the home tournament, Indonesia Open, but lost in the quarter finals from 7th seed and eventual champions Indian pair Satwiksairaj Rankireddy and Chirag Shetty in straight matches.

In July, Alfian competed at the Korea Open, but lost in the final against 3rd seed Indian pair Satwiksairaj Rankireddy and Chirag Shetty for second times in a row. In the next tour, he competed at the Japan Open, but lost in the semi-finals against Chinese Taipei pair Lee Yang and Wang Chi-lin.

In early August, Alfian competed at the Australian Open, but had to lose in the quarter-finals from 8th seed Korean pair Kang Min-hyuk and Seo Seung-jae in rubber games. In late August, he competed at the World Championships, but lost in the second round from Taiwanese pair Lee Jhe-huei and Yang Po-hsuan in straight games. Made his second appearance at the Asian Games, Alfian failed to bring home any medals after lost in the quarter-finals in both the men's doubles and team events.

=== 2024 ===
Alfian and Aridanto are one of the most consistent pairs that Indonesia has had in 2024. Having won two titles and one runner-up in the BWF World Tour, they are still firmly in the top 5 of the BWF rankings. Their first title came from the All England Open in March, where the pair successfully defended the title after defeating Aaron Chia and Soh Wooi Yik in the final. The duo reached the finals in the Singapore Open in June, losing to He Jiting and Ren Xiangyu. It took months to win their second title, where in November they emerged victorious in the Japan Masters beating host pairing Takuro Hoki and Yugo Kobayashi. Alfian and Ardianto have participated in 13 BWF World Tours this year, and have only suffered two defeats in the early rounds, in the first round of the Indonesia Open and the second round of the China Masters. Together with the Indonesia national team, Alfian won the silver medal in the Thomas Cup, after the team was defeated by the host country China 1–3. He also made his debut at the Olympics in Paris, stopped in the quarter-finals to number 1 seed Liang Weikeng and Wang Chang.

=== 2025 ===
Alfian and Ardianto had a bad start in 2025, losing out in early rounds in the Malaysia and India Opens. They manage to recover well in their home ground Indonesia Masters by advancing to the final before losing to Man Wei Chong and Tee Kai Wun with the score 19–21, 11–21. In his third appearance with the Indonesia team at the Sudirman Cup, he finally won a medal, where the team secured the bronze. Since his partner, Ardianto, took a temporary leave from the world tour, Alfian was paired with Muhammad Shohibul Fikri. The new pairing reached the quarter-finals in the Japan Open and won the China Open.

== Awards and nominations ==
Award	Year	Category	Result	Ref.
Gatra Awards	2021	Sports Category with 2020 Thomas Cup squad	Won	
BWF Awards	2022	Most Improved Player of The Year with Muhammad Rian Ardianto	Won	
Golden Award SIWO PWI	2019	Favorite Team with 2018 Asian Games men's badminton team	Nominated	
Indonesian Sport Awards	2018	Favorite Male Athlete Duos with Muhammad Rian Ardianto	Nominated	
iNews Indonesia Awards	2023	Favorite Athlete with Muhammad Rian Ardianto	Nominated	

== Achievements ==
=== BWF World Championships ===
Men's doubles
Year	Venue	Partner	Opponent	Score	Result	Ref.
2019	St. Jakobshalle; Basel, Switzerland	(Indonesia) Muhammad Rian Ardianto	(Indonesia) Mohammad Ahsan (Indonesia) Hendra Setiawan	16–21, 21–15, 10–21	Bronze	
2022	Tokyo Metropolitan Gymnasium; Tokyo, Japan	(Indonesia) Muhammad Rian Ardianto	(Indonesia) Mohammad Ahsan (Indonesia) Hendra Setiawan	21–23, 21–12, 16–21	Bronze	

=== Asian Games ===
Men's doubles
Year	Venue	Partner	Opponent	Score	Result	Ref.
2018	Istora Gelora Bung Karno, Jakarta, Indonesia	(Indonesia) Muhammad Rian Ardianto	(Indonesia) Marcus Fernaldi Gideon (Indonesia) Kevin Sanjaya Sukamuljo	21–13, 18–21, 22–24	Silver	
2026	Ichinomiya City Municipal Gymnasium, Ichinomiya, Japan	(Indonesia) Muhammad Shohibul Fikri	(China) Liang Weikeng (China) Wang Chang	17–21, 21–13, 9–21	Bronze	

=== Asian Championships ===
Men's doubles
Year	Venue	Partner	Opponent	Score	Result	Ref.
2022	Muntinlupa Sports Complex, Metro Manila, Philippines	(Indonesia) Muhammad Rian Ardianto	(Indonesia) Pramudya Kusumawardana (Indonesia) Yeremia Rambitan	20–22, 21–13, 18–21	Bronze	
2026	Ningbo Olympic Sports Center Gymnasium, Ningbo, China	(Indonesia) Muhammad Shohibul Fikri	(South Korea) Kang Min-hyuk (South Korea) Ki Dong-ju	13–21, 21–14, 16–21	Bronze	

=== SEA Games ===
Men's doubles
Year	Venue	Partner	Opponent	Score	Result	Ref.
2017	Axiata Arena; Kuala Lumpur, Malaysia	(Indonesia) Muhammad Rian Ardianto	(Thailand) Kittinupong Kedren (Thailand) Dechapol Puavaranukroh	17–21, 21–23	Bronze	

=== BWF World Tour (16 titles, 13 runners-up) ===
The BWF World Tour, which was announced on 19 March 2017 and implemented in 2018, is a series of elite badminton tournaments sanctioned by the Badminton World Federation (BWF). The BWF World Tour is divided into levels of World Tour Finals, Super 1000, Super 750, Super 500, Super 300, and the BWF Tour Super 100.

Men's doubles
Year	Tournament	Level	Partner	Opponent	Score	Result	Ref.
2018	Malaysia Masters	Super 500	(Indonesia) Muhammad Rian Ardianto	(Malaysia) Goh V Shem (Malaysia) Tan Wee Kiong	14–21, 24–22, 21–13	(gold) Winner	
2018	German Open	Super 300	(Indonesia) Muhammad Rian Ardianto	(Japan) Takuto Inoue (Japan) Yuki Kaneko	16–21, 18–21	(silver) Runner-up	
2018	Syed Modi International	Super 300	(Indonesia) Muhammad Rian Ardianto	(India) Satwiksairaj Rankireddy (India) Chirag Shetty	21–11, 22–20	(gold) Winner	
2019	Swiss Open	Super 300	(Indonesia) Muhammad Rian Ardianto	(Chinese Taipei) Lee Yang (Chinese Taipei) Wang Chi-lin	21–19, 21–16	(gold) Winner	
2019	Korea Open	Super 500	(Indonesia) Muhammad Rian Ardianto	(Japan) Takeshi Kamura (Japan) Keigo Sonoda	21–16, 21–17	(gold) Winner	
2022	Swiss Open	Super 300	(Indonesia) Muhammad Rian Ardianto	(Malaysia) Goh Sze Fei (Malaysia) Nur Izzuddin	21–18, 21–19	(gold) Winner	
2022	Korea Open	Super 500	(Indonesia) Muhammad Rian Ardianto	(South Korea) Kang Min-hyuk (South Korea) Seo Seung-jae	21–19, 15–21, 18–21	(silver) Runner-up	
2022	Thailand Open	Super 500	(Indonesia) Muhammad Rian Ardianto	(Japan) Takuro Hoki (Japan) Yugo Kobayashi	4^{r}–13	(silver) Runner-up	
2022	Indonesia Masters	Super 500	(Indonesia) Muhammad Rian Ardianto	(China) Liang Weikeng (China) Wang Chang	21–10, 21–17	(gold) Winner	
2022	Malaysia Open	Super 750	(Indonesia) Muhammad Rian Ardianto	(Japan) Takuro Hoki (Japan) Yugo Kobayashi	22–24, 21–16, 9–21	(silver) Runner-up	
2022	Malaysia Masters	Super 500	(Indonesia) Muhammad Rian Ardianto	(Indonesia) Mohammad Ahsan (Indonesia) Hendra Setiawan	21–12, 21–19	(gold) Winner	
2022	Singapore Open	Super 500	(Indonesia) Muhammad Rian Ardianto	(Indonesia) Leo Rolly Carnando (Indonesia) Daniel Marthin	21–9, 14–21, 16–21	(silver) Runner-up	
2022	Denmark Open	Super 750	(Indonesia) Muhammad Rian Ardianto	(Indonesia) Marcus Fernaldi Gideon (Indonesia) Kevin Sanjaya Sukamuljo	21–19, 28–26	(gold) Winner	
2023	Malaysia Open	Super 1000	(Indonesia) Muhammad Rian Ardianto	(China) Liang Weikeng (China) Wang Chang	21–18, 18–21, 21–13	(gold) Winner	
2023	All England Open	Super 1000	(Indonesia) Muhammad Rian Ardianto	(Indonesia) Mohammad Ahsan (Indonesia) Hendra Setiawan	21–17, 21–14	(gold) Winner	
2023	Korea Open	Super 500	(Indonesia) Muhammad Rian Ardianto	(India) Satwiksairaj Rankireddy (India) Chirag Shetty	21–17, 13–21, 14–21	(silver) Runner-up	
2024	All England Open	Super 1000	(Indonesia) Muhammad Rian Ardianto	(Malaysia) Aaron Chia (Malaysia) Soh Wooi Yik	21–16, 21–16	(gold) Winner	
2024	Singapore Open	Super 750	(Indonesia) Muhammad Rian Ardianto	(China) He Jiting (China) Ren Xiangyu	19–21, 14–21	(silver) Runner-up	
2024	Japan Masters	Super 500	(Indonesia) Muhammad Rian Ardianto	(Japan) Takuro Hoki (Japan) Yugo Kobayashi	21–15, 17–21, 21–17	(gold) Winner	
2025	Indonesia Masters	Super 500	(Indonesia) Muhammad Rian Ardianto	(Malaysia) Man Wei Chong (Malaysia) Tee Kai Wun	11–21, 19–21	(silver) Runner-up	
2025	China Open	Super 1000	(Indonesia) Muhammad Shohibul Fikri	(Malaysia) Aaron Chia (Malaysia) Soh Wooi Yik	21–15, 21–14	(gold) Winner	
2025	Korea Open	Super 500	(Indonesia) Muhammad Shohibul Fikri	(South Korea) Kim Won-ho (South Korea) Seo Seung-jae	16–21, 21–23	(silver) Runner-up	
2025	Denmark Open	Super 750	(Indonesia) Muhammad Shohibul Fikri	(Japan) Takuro Hoki (Japan) Yugo Kobayashi	18–21, 21–15, 19–21	(silver) Runner-up	
2025	French Open	Super 750	(Indonesia) Muhammad Shohibul Fikri	(South Korea) Kim Won-ho (South Korea) Seo Seung-jae	21–10, 13–21, 12–21	(silver) Runner-up	
2025	Australian Open	Super 500	(Indonesia) Muhammad Shohibul Fikri	(Indonesia) Raymond Indra (Indonesia) Nikolaus Joaquin	20–22, 21–10, 18–21	(silver) Runner-up	
2026	Singapore Open	Super 750	(Indonesia) Muhammad Shohibul Fikri	(India) Satwiksairaj Rankireddy (India) Chirag Shetty	21–18, 17–21, 16–21	(silver) Runner-up	
2026	Japan Open	Super 750	(Indonesia) Muhammad Shohibul Fikri	(South Korea) Kim Won-ho (South Korea) Seo Seung-jae	21–19, 21–17	(gold) Winner	
2026	China Open	Super 1000	(Indonesia) Muhammad Shohibul Fikri	(South Korea) Kim Won-ho (South Korea) Seo Seung-jae	16–21, 21–19, 21–19	(gold) Winner	
2026	Denmark Open	Super 750	(Indonesia) Muhammad Shohibul Fikri	(Malaysia) Aaron Chia (Malaysia) Soh Wooi Yik	21–8, 21–11	(gold) Winner	

=== BWF Grand Prix (1 title, 2 runners-up) ===
The BWF Grand Prix had two levels, the Grand Prix and Grand Prix Gold. It was a series of badminton tournaments sanctioned by the Badminton World Federation (BWF) and played between 2007 and 2017.

Men's doubles
Year	Tournament	Partner	Opponent	Score	Result	Ref.
2015	New Zealand Open	(Indonesia) Muhammad Rian Ardianto	(China) Huang Kaixiang (China) Zheng Siwei	21–16, 17–21, 9–21	(silver) Runner-up	
2016	Chinese Taipei Masters	(Indonesia) Muhammad Rian Ardianto	(Chinese Taipei) Chen Hung-ling (Chinese Taipei) Wang Chi-lin	11–6, 11–6, 11–13, 9–11, 12–10	(gold) Winner	
2017	Bitburger Open	(Indonesia) Muhammad Rian Ardianto	(Denmark) Kim Astrup (Denmark) Anders Skaarup Rasmussen	19–21, 21–19, 18–21	(silver) Runner-up	

BWF Grand Prix Gold tournament
BWF Grand Prix tournament

=== BWF International Challenge/Series (4 titles) ===
Men's doubles
Year	Tournament	Partner	Opponent	Score	Result	Ref.
2014	Indonesia International	(Indonesia) Muhammad Rian Ardianto	(Indonesia) Fran Kurniawan (Indonesia) Agripina Prima Rahmanto Putra	9–11, 11–9, 11–9, 11–8	(gold) Winner	
2015	Austrian Open	(Indonesia) Muhammad Rian Ardianto	(England) Peter Briggs (England) Tom Wolfenden	23–21, 18–21, 21–19	(gold) Winner	
2015	Indonesia International	(Indonesia) Muhammad Rian Ardianto	(Indonesia) Hantoro (Indonesia) Rian Swastedian	21–12, 17–21, 21–15	(gold) Winner	
2016	Indonesia International	(Indonesia) Muhammad Rian Ardianto	(Japan) Yoshiki Tsukamoto (Japan) Shunsuke Yamamura	21–12, 21–19	(gold) Winner	

BWF International Challenge tournament
BWF International Series tournament

== Performance timeline ==
Key

W	Won	F	Finalist	SF	Semi-finalist
QF	Quarter-finalist	#R	Rounds 4, 3, 2, 1	RR	Round-robin stage
Q#	Qualification round	A	Absent	w/d	Withdrew
G	Gold	S	Silver	B	Bronze
NH	Not held	N/A	Not applicable	DNQ	Did not qualify

=== National team ===
- Junior level

Team events	2013
Asian Junior Championships	B
World Junior Championships	S

- Senior level

Team events	2017	2018	2019	2020	2021	2022	2023	2024	2025	2026	Ref
SEA Games	G	NH	G	NH	A	NH	A	NH	A	NH	
Asia Team Championships	NH	A	NH	G	NH	A	NH	A	NH	A	
Asia Mixed Team Championships	A	NH	B	NH			QF	NH	A	NH	
Asian Games	NH	S	NH			QF	NH			G	
Thomas Cup	NH	B	NH	G	NH	S	NH	S	NH	GS	
Sudirman Cup	A	NH	DNP	NH	QF	NH	QF	NH	B	NH	

=== Individual competitions ===
==== Junior level ====
===== Boys' doubles =====
Events	2013
Asian Junior Championships	2R
World Junior Championships	QF

===== Mixed doubles =====
Events	2013
Asian Junior Championships	2R

==== Senior level ====
===== Men's doubles =====
Events	2017	2018	2019	2020	2021	2022	2023	2024	2025	2026	Ref
SEA Games	B	NH	QF	NH	A	NH	A	NH	A	NH	
Asian Championships	2R	2R	2R	NH		B	QF	QF	QF	B	
Asian Games	NH	S	NH			QF	NH			B	
World Championships	A	3R	B	NH	w/d	B	2R	NH	3R	QF	
Olympic Games	NH			DNQ	NH			QF	NH		

Tournament	BWF Superseries / Grand Prix				BWF World Tour									Best	Ref
Tournament	2014	2015	2016	2017	2018	2019	2020	2021	2022	2023	2024	2025	2026	Best	Ref
Malaysia Open	A			2R	2R	SF	NH		F	W	QF	1R	SF	W ('23)	
India Open	A						NH		A	SF	QF	2R	A	SF ('23)	
Indonesia Masters	2R	2R	1R	NH	2R	QF	SF	1R	W	QF	SF	F	QF	W ('22)	
Thailand Masters	NH		A	QF	QF	A		NH		A				QF ('17, '18)	
German Open	A	1R	A		F	A	NH		2R	A				F ('18)	
All England Open	A			1R	1R	SF	2R	w/d	1R	W	W	2R	2R	W ('23, '24)	
Swiss Open	A			QF	A	W	NH	A	W	A				W ('19, '22)	
Thailand Open	NH	A	SF	QF	A	2R	2R	NH	F	A		SF	A	F ('22)	
Thailand Open	NH	A	SF	QF	A	2R	1R	NH	F	A		SF	A	F ('22)	
Malaysia Masters	A			2R	W	2R	SF	NH	W	1R	A			W ('18, '22)	
Singapore Open	A			2R	A	QF	NH		F	1R	F	QF	F	F ('22, '24, '26)	
Indonesia Open	A		1R	SF	SF	QF	NH	QF	QF	QF	1R	SF	1R	SF ('17, '18, 25)	
Australian Open	A			1R	A	1R	NH		w/d	QF	A	F	w/d	F ('25)	
Macau Open	A		SF	A			NH				A			SF ('16)	
Japan Open	A			2R	QF	2R	NH		QF	SF	QF	QF	W	W ('26)	
China Open	A				2R	SF	NH			1R	QF	W	W	W ('25, 26)	
Chinese Taipei Open	A		QF	A		QF	NH		A					QF ('16, '19)	
Korea Masters	A				1R	A	NH		A					1R ('18)	
China Masters	A		QF	A	1R	2R	NH			2R	2R	SF	w/d	SF ('25)	
Indonesia Masters Super 100	NH				A	2R	NH		A					2R ('19)	
Vietnam Open	A	QF	2R	A			NH		A					QF ('15)	
Arctic Open	N/A						NH			A	QF	A		QF ('24)	
Denmark Open	A				w/d	QF	A	QF	W	SF	SF	F	W	W ('22, '26)	
French Open	A			QF	w/d	1R	NH	SF	2R	QF	QF	F	1R	F ('25)	
Hylo Open	A			F	A			QF	A			QF	A	F ('17)	
Korea Open	A			1R	A	W	NH		F	F	A	F	A	W ('19)	
Japan Masters	NH									w/d	W	A	1R	W ('24)	
Hong Kong Open	A			1R	SF	2R	NH			2R	A	w/d	2R	SF ('18)	
Syed Modi International	A			SF	W	A	NH		A					W ('18)	
Superseries / World Tour Finals	DNQ								SF	SF	SF	RR	Q	SF ('22, '23, '24)	
Chinese Taipei Masters	NH	1R	W	NH										W ('16)	
New Zealand Open	A	F	2R	A			NH							F ('15)	
Spain Masters	NH				A				NH	QF	A	NH		QF ('23)	
Year-end ranking	112	49	24	17	7	5	6	8	1	6	4	6		1	
Tournament	2014	2015	2016	2017	2018	2019	2020	2021	2022	2023	2024	2025	2026	Best	Ref

===== Mixed doubles =====
Tournament	BWF Superseries / Grand Prix	Best	Ref
Tournament	2013	Best	Ref
Indonesia Masters	1R	1R ('13)	
Year-end ranking	536	173	

== Record against selected opponents ==
Men's doubles results against year-end Finals finalists, World Championships semi-finalists, and Olympic quarter-finalists. Accurate as of 23 December 2025.

=== Muhammad Rian Ardianto ===
Players	M	W	L	Diff.
(China) Chai Biao & Hong Wei	1	0	1	–1
(China) Chen Boyang & Liu Yi	3	2	1	+1
(China) Li Junhui & Liu Yuchen	7	3	4	–1
(China) Liang Weikeng & Wang Chang	9	3	6	–3
(China) Liu Cheng & Zhang Nan	3	2	1	+1
(China) He Jiting & Tan Qiang	4	2	2	0
(China) Liu Yuchen & Ou Xuanyi	5	2	3	–1
(Chinese Taipei) Chen Hung-ling & Wang Chi-lin	2	1	1	0
(Chinese Taipei) Lee Yang & Wang Chi-lin	9	6	3	+3
(Denmark) Mathias Boe & Carsten Mogensen	2	0	2	–2
(Denmark) Kim Astrup & Anders Rasmussen	9	3	6	–3
(England) Marcus Ellis & Chris Langridge	3	2	1	+1
(India) Satwiksairaj Rankireddy & Chirag Shetty	6	2	4	–2
(Indonesia) Mohammad Ahsan & Hendra Setiawan	7	4	3	+1
(Indonesia) Marcus Fernaldi Gideon & Kevin Sanjaya Sukamuljo	10	4	6	–2

Players	M	W	L	Diff.
(Japan) Takuro Hoki & Yugo Kobayashi	9	5	4	+1
(Japan) Hiroyuki Endo & Yuta Watanabe	2	1	1	0
(Japan) Takeshi Kamura & Keigo Sonoda	11	5	6	–1
(Malaysia) Aaron Chia & Soh Wooi Yik	10	4	6	–2
(Malaysia) Goh Sze Fei & Nur Izzuddin	12	8	4	+4
(Malaysia) Goh V Shem & Tan Wee Kiong	3	3	0	+3
(Malaysia) Ong Yew Sin & Teo Ee Yi	13	7	6	+1
(Russia) Vladimir Ivanov & Ivan Sozonov	3	2	1	+1
(South Korea) Kang Min-hyuk & Seo Seung-jae	9	3	6	–3 (Note: Tournament software did not included the men's team event of the 2022 Asian Games results for head-to-head.)
(South Korea) Kim Won-ho & Seo Seung-jae	3	2	1	+1
(South Korea) Ko Sung-hyun & Shin Baek-cheol	4	2	2	0
(South Korea) Lee Yong-dae & Yoo Yeon-seong	1	0	1	–1
(Thailand) Bodin Isara & Maneepong Jongjit	1	1	0	+1
(Thailand) Supak Jomkoh & Kittinupong Kedren	3	3	0	+3

=== Muhammad Shohibul Fikri ===
Players	M	W	L	Diff.
(China) Liang Weikeng & Wang Chang	6	5	1	+4
(India) Satwiksairaj Rankireddy & Chirag Shetty	2	1	1	0
(Japan) Takuro Hoki & Yugo Kobayashi	2	1	1	0
(Malaysia) Aaron Chia & Soh Wooi Yik	3	2	1	+1
(Malaysia) Goh Sze Fei & Nur Izzuddin	2	2	1	+1
(South Korea) Kim Won-ho & Seo Seung-jae	6	3	3	0
