= 2022 French Open (badminton) =

2022 badminton tournament in Paris

Tournament details
- Dates: 25–30 October
- Level: Super 750
- Total prize money: US$675,000
- Venue: Stade Pierre de Coubertin
- Location: Paris, France

Champions
- Men's singles: (Denmark) Viktor Axelsen
- Women's singles: (China) He Bingjiao
- Men's doubles: (India) Satwiksairaj Rankireddy (India) Chirag Shetty
- Women's doubles: (Malaysia) Pearly Tan (Malaysia) Thinaah Muralitharan
- Mixed doubles: (China) Zheng Siwei (China) Huang Yaqiong

The 2022 French Open (officially known as the Yonex French Open 2022 for sponsorship reasons) was a badminton tournament which took place at the Stade Pierre de Coubertin in Paris, France, from 25 to 30 October 2022 and had a total prize of US$675,000.

== Tournament ==
The 2022 French Open was the eighteenth tournament according to the 2022 BWF World Tour. It was a part of the French Open, which had been held since 1935. This tournament was organized by French Badminton Federation with sanction from the BWF.

=== Venue ===
This international tournament was held at the Stade Pierre de Coubertin in Paris, France.

=== Point distribution ===
Below is the point distribution table for each phase of the tournament based on the BWF points system for the BWF World Tour Super 750 event.

Winner	Runner-up	3/4	5/8	9/16	17/32
11,000	9,350	7,700	6,050	4,320	2,660

=== Prize money ===
The total prize money for this tournament was US$675,000. The distribution of the prize money was in accordance with BWF regulations.

Event	Winner	Finalist	Semi-finals	Quarter-finals	Last 16	Last 32
Singles	$47,250	$22,950	$9,450	$3,712.50	$2,025	$675
Doubles	$49,950	$23,625	$9,450	$4,218.75	$2,193.75	$675

== Men's singles ==
=== Seeds ===
1. (Denmark) Viktor Axelsen (champion)
2. (Denmark) Anders Antonsen (withdrew)
3. (Malaysia) Lee Zii Jia (first round)
4. (Chinese Taipei) Chou Tien-chen (first round)
5. (Japan) Kento Momota (withdrew)
6. (Indonesia) Anthony Sinisuka Ginting (first round)
7. (Singapore) Loh Kean Yew (quarter-finals)
8. (Indonesia) Jonatan Christie (quarter-finals)

=== Finals ===
Semi-finals
1	(Denmark) Viktor Axelsen	21	21
(Japan) Kodai Naraoka	12	8
(Hong Kong) Lee Cheuk Yiu	18	14
(Denmark) Rasmus Gemke	21	21

Final
1	(Denmark) Viktor Axelsen	21	21
(Denmark) Rasmus Gemke	14	15

=== Top half ===
==== Section 1 ====
First round
1	(Denmark) V Axelsen	21	22
(Japan) K Nishimoto	11	20
(China) Shi YQ	16	14
(Thailand) S Thammasin	21	21
7	(Singapore) Loh K Y	21	21
(Netherlands) M Caljouw	14	17
(Japan) K Tsuneyama	19	21	21
(Indonesia) C A Dwi Wardoyo	21	19	18

Second round
1	(Denmark) V Axelsen	21	21
(Thailand) S Thammasin	19	17
7	(Singapore) Loh K Y	21	21
(Japan) K Tsuneyama	14	11

Quarter-finals
1	(Denmark) V Axelsen	21	21
7	(Singapore) Loh K Y	11	17

==== Section 2 ====
First round
3	(Malaysia) Lee Z J	19	18
(Indonesia) S H Rhustavito	21	21
(Canada) B Yang	15	18
(Japan) K Naraoka	21	21
8	(Indonesia) J Christie	21	21
(Denmark) H-K Vittinghus	19	14
(China) Zhao JP	22	18
(Hong Kong) Ng K L	24	21

Second round
(Indonesia) S H Rhustavito	23	9	20
(Japan) K Naraoka	21	21	22
8	(Indonesia) J Christie	21	8	21
(Hong Kong) Ng K L	17	21	13

Quarter-finals
(Japan) K Naraoka	14	21	17
8	(Indonesia) J Christie	21	14	13^{r}

=== Bottom half ===
==== Section 3 ====
First round
(Malaysia) Liew D	16	21	16
(India) Prannoy H. S.	21	16	21
(China) Lu GZ	22	21
PFR	(China) Li SF	20	14
(France) T J Popov	11	24	13
(Chinese Taipei) Wang T-w	21	22	21
(Hong Kong) Lee C Y	23	21	21
4	(Chinese Taipei) Chou T-c	21	23	18

Second round
(India) Prannoy H. S.	19	22	19
(China) Lu GZ	21	20	21
(Chinese Taipei) Wang T-w	21	22	10
(Hong Kong) Lee C Y	13	24	21

Quarter-finals
(China) Lu GZ	14	21	18
(Hong Kong) Lee C Y	21	11	21

==== Section 4 ====
First round
(Thailand) K Vitidsarn	21	21
(Thailand) K Wangcharoen	15	15
(India) Sa Verma	21	21	22
6	(Indonesia) A S Ginting	15	23	20
(India) L Sen	18	18
(India) S Kidambi	21	21
(Denmark) R Gemke	21	21
PFR	(Republic of Ireland) N Nguyen	19	16

Second round
(Thailand) K Vitidsarn	21	21
(India) Sa Verma	18	11
(India) S Kidambi	21	12	19
(Denmark) R Gemke	19	21	21

Quarter-finals
(Thailand) K Vitidsarn	21	18	11
(Denmark) R Gemke	14	21	21

== Women's singles ==
=== Seeds ===
1. (Japan) Akane Yamaguchi (semi-finals)
2. (Chinese Taipei) Tai Tzu-ying (semi-finals)
3. (China) Chen Yufei (second round)
4. (Spain) Carolina Marín (final)
5. (Thailand) Ratchanok Intanon (quarter-finals)
6. (Japan) Nozomi Okuhara (second round)
7. (Thailand) Pornpawee Chochuwong (first round)
8. (China) He Bingjiao (champion)

=== Finals ===
Semi-finals
1	(Japan) Akane Yamaguchi	14	18
4	(Spain) Carolina Marín	21	21
8	(China) He Bingjiao	21	21
2	(Chinese Taipei) Tai Tzu-ying	15	10

Final
4	(Spain) Carolina Marín	21	9	20
8	(China) He Bingjiao	16	21	22

=== Top half ===
==== Section 1 ====
First round
1	(Japan) A Yamaguchi	21	21
(Canada) M Li	8	14
(Denmark) J D Jakobsen	12	12
(China) Wang ZY	21	21
6	(Japan) N Okuhara	21	21
PFR	(Spain) C Azurmendi	14	11
(Scotland) K Gilmour	18	14
(Thailand) L Chaiwan	21	21

Second round
1	(Japan) A Yamaguchi	14	21	21
(China) Wang ZY	21	6	16
6	(Japan) N Okuhara	18	17
(Thailand) L Chaiwan	21	21

Quarter-finals
1	(Japan) A Yamaguchi	21	21
(Thailand) L Chaiwan	7	6

==== Section 2 ====
First round
4	(Spain) C Marín	21	23
(China) Zhang YM	18	21
(Indonesia) G M Tunjung	21	18	18
(United States) BW Zhang	13	21	21
7	(Thailand) P Chochuwong	21	21	18
(China) Han Y	23	13	21
(India) S Nehwal	21	17	19
(Germany) Y Li	13	21	21

Second round
4	(Spain) C Marín	w	/	o
(United States) BW Zhang
(China) Han Y	21	21
(Germany) Y Li	18	8

Quarter-finals
4	(Spain) C Marín	21	21
(China) Han Y	14	15

=== Bottom half ===
==== Section 3 ====
First round
(Denmark) M Blichfeldt	21	21
(United States) I Wang	18	16
(Denmark) L Kjærsfeldt	8	13
8	(China) He BJ	21	21
(Chinese Taipei) Pai Y-p	21	8	13
(Thailand) B Ongbamrungphan	12	21	21
(Singapore) Yeo J M	13	16
3	(China) Chen YF	21	21

Second round
(Denmark) M Blichfeldt	15	10
8	(China) He BJ	21	21
(Thailand) B Ongbamrungphan	13	21	21
3	(China) Chen YF	21	19	15

Quarter-finals
8	(China) He BJ	20	21	21
(Thailand) B Ongbamrungphan	22	14	12

==== Section 4 ====
First round
(Thailand) S Katethong	21	21
(Denmark) L Christophersen	17	15
(Japan) A Ohori	19	6
5	(Thailand) R Intanon	21	21
(South Korea) Kim G-e	21	21
(Belgium) L Tan	10	11
(Chinese Taipei) Hsu W-c	13	17
2	(Chinese Taipei) Tai T-y	21	21

Second round
(Thailand) S Katethong	10	17
5	(Thailand) R Intanon	21	21
(South Korea) Kim G-e	18	14
2	(Chinese Taipei) Tai T-y	21	21

Quarter-finals
5	(Thailand) R Intanon	18	10
2	(Chinese Taipei) Tai T-y	21	21

== Men's doubles ==
=== Seeds ===
1. (Japan) Takuro Hoki / Yugo Kobayashi (quarter-finals)
2. (Indonesia) Marcus Fernaldi Gideon / Kevin Sanjaya Sukamuljo (first round)
3. (Indonesia) Mohammad Ahsan / Hendra Setiawan (first round)
4. (Malaysia) Aaron Chia / Soh Wooi Yik (first round)
5. (Indonesia) Fajar Alfian / Muhammad Rian Ardianto (second round)
6. (Denmark) Kim Astrup / Anders Skaarup Rasmussen (first round)
7. (India) Satwiksairaj Rankireddy / Chirag Shetty (champions)
8. (Malaysia) Ong Yew Sin / Teo Ee Yi (quarter-finals)

=== Finals ===
Semi-finals
7	(India) Satwiksairaj Rankireddy (India) Chirag Shetty	21	21
(South Korea) Choi Sol-gyu (South Korea) Kim Won-ho	18	14
(England) Ben Lane (England) Sean Vendy	15	14
(Chinese Taipei) Lu Ching-yao (Chinese Taipei) Yang Po-han	21	21

Final
7	(India) Satwiksairaj Rankireddy (India) Chirag Shetty	21	21
(Chinese Taipei) Lu Ching-yao (Chinese Taipei) Yang Po-han	13	19

=== Top half ===
==== Section 1 ====
First round
1	(Japan) T Hoki (Japan) Y Kobayashi	21	23
(South Korea) Kang M-h (South Korea) Seo S-j	14	21
(Japan) K Matsui (Japan) Y Takeuchi	18	15
(Scotland) A Dunn (Scotland) A Hall	21	21
7	(India) S Rankireddy (India) C Shetty	19	21	21
(France) C Popov (France) T J Popov	21	9	13
(France) L Corvée (France) R Labar	16	17
(Malaysia) Man W C (Malaysia) Tee K W	21	21

Second round
1	(Japan) T Hoki (Japan) Y Kobayashi	21	21
(Scotland) A Dunn (Scotland) A Hall	12	16
7	(India) S Rankireddy (India) C Shetty	21	21
(Malaysia) Man W C (Malaysia) Tee K W	16	14

Quarter-finals
1	(Japan) T Hoki (Japan) Y Kobayashi	21	18
7	(India) S Rankireddy (India) C Shetty	23	21

==== Section 2 ====
First round
3	(Indonesia) M Ahsan (Indonesia) H Setiawan	16	21
(Chinese Taipei) Lee J-h (Chinese Taipei) Yang P-hs	21	23
(Chinese Taipei) Lee Y (Chinese Taipei) Lu C	19	14
(South Korea) Choi S-g (South Korea) Kim W-h	21	21
8	(Malaysia) Ong Y S (Malaysia) Teo E Y	21	21
(Scotland) C Grimley (Scotland) M Grimley	18	13
(Indonesia) L R Carnando (Indonesia) D Marthin	21	21
(Netherlands) R Jille (Netherlands) T van der Lecq	13	18

Second round
(Chinese Taipei) Lee J-h (Chinese Taipei) Yang P-hs	21	15	14
(South Korea) Choi S-g (South Korea) Kim W-h	13	21	21
8	(Malaysia) Ong Y S (Malaysia) Teo E Y	21	17	22
(Indonesia) L R Carnando (Indonesia) D Marthin	18	21	20

Quarter-finals
(South Korea) Choi S-g (South Korea) Kim W-h	21	21
8	(Malaysia) Ong Y S (Malaysia) Teo E Y	18	18

=== Bottom half ===
==== Section 3 ====
First round
(Denmark) J Bay (Denmark) L Mølhede	19	7
(England) B Lane (England) S Vendy	21	21
(India) Arjun M. R. (India) D Kapila	15	16
5	(Indonesia) F Alfian (Indonesia) M R Ardianto	21	21
(Germany) M Lamsfuß (Germany) M Seidel	18	21	22
(Thailand) S Jomkoh (Thailand) K Kedren	21	19	20
(China) Liang WK (China) Wang C	21	21
4	(Malaysia) A Chia (Malaysia) Soh W Y	13	14

Second round
(England) B Lane (England) S Vendy	16	23	21
5	(Indonesia) F Alfian (Indonesia) M R Ardianto	21	21	15
(Germany) M Lamsfuß (Germany) M Seidel	21	19	15
(China) Liang WK (China) Wang C	18	21	21

Quarter-finals
(England) B Lane (England) S Vendy	25	21
(China) Liang WK (China) Wang C	23	10

==== Section 4 ====
First round
(Indonesia) M S Fikri (Indonesia) B Maulana	21	21
(Malaysia) Tan K M (Malaysia) Tan W K	19	12
(Malaysia) Goh S F (Malaysia) N Izzuddin	21	21
6	(Denmark) K Astrup (Denmark) A S Rasmussen	19	10
(China) Liu YC (China) Ou XY	21	22
(Japan) A Koga (Japan) T Saito	14	20
(Chinese Taipei) Lu C-y (Chinese Taipei) Yang P-ha	21	15	21
2	(Indonesia) M F Gideon (Indonesia) K S Sukamuljo	15	21	17

Second round
(Indonesia) M S Fikri (Indonesia) B Maulana	21	19	21
(Malaysia) Goh S F (Malaysia) N Izzuddin	18	21	17
(China) Liu YC (China) Ou XY	22	16
(Chinese Taipei) Lu C-y (Chinese Taipei) Yang P-ha	24	21

Quarter-finals
(Indonesia) M S Fikri (Indonesia) B Maulana	16	21	16
(Chinese Taipei) Lu C-y (Chinese Taipei) Yang P-ha	21	18	21

== Women's doubles ==
=== Seeds ===
1. (China) Chen Qingchen / Jia Yifan (quarter-finals)
2. (South Korea) Kim So-yeong / Kong Hee-yong (quarter-finals)
3. (Japan) Nami Matsuyama / Chiharu Shida (quarter-finals)
4. (Japan) Mayu Matsumoto / Wakana Nagahara (final)
5. (Japan) Yuki Fukushima / Sayaka Hirota (semi-finals)
6. (Thailand) Jongkolphan Kititharakul / Rawinda Prajongjai (second round)
7. (Indonesia) Apriyani Rahayu / Siti Fadia Silva Ramadhanti (first round)
8. (South Korea) Jeong Na-eun / Kim Hye-jeong (quarter-finals)

=== Finals ===
Semi-finals
(South Korea) Baek Ha-na (South Korea) Lee So-hee	13	17
(Malaysia) Pearly Tan (Malaysia) Thinaah Muralitharan	21	21
4	(Japan) Mayu Matsumoto (Japan) Wakana Nagahara	21	25
5	(Japan) Yuki Fukushima (Japan) Sayaka Hirota	14	23

Final
(Malaysia) Pearly Tan (Malaysia) Thinaah Muralitharan	21	18	21
4	(Japan) Mayu Matsumoto (Japan) Wakana Nagahara	19	21	15

=== Top half ===
==== Section 1 ====
First round
1	(China) Chen QC (China) Jia YF	21	22
(Bulgaria) G Stoeva (Bulgaria) S Stoeva	13	20
(Japan) R Iwanaga (Japan) K Nakanishi	19	10
(Thailand) S Paewsampran (Thailand) P Supajirakul	21	21
6	(Thailand) J Kititharakul (Thailand) R Prajongjai	23	22
(India) T Jolly (India) G Gopichand Pullela	21	20
(South Korea) Baek H-n (South Korea) Lee S-h	21	21
(China) Zhang SX (China) Zheng Y	17	12

Second round
1	(China) Chen QC (China) Jia YF	21	21
(Thailand) S Paewsampran (Thailand) P Supajirakul	19	11
6	(Thailand) J Kititharakul (Thailand) R Prajongjai	16	16
(South Korea) Baek H-n (South Korea) Lee S-h	21	21

Quarter-finals
1	(China) Chen QC (China) Jia YF	16	21
(South Korea) Baek H-n (South Korea) Lee S-h	21	23

==== Section 2 ====
First round
3	(Japan) N Matsuyama (Japan) C Shida	21	21
(South Korea) Lee Y-l (South Korea) Shin S-c	12	13
(Spain) C Azurmendi (Spain) B Corrales	12	9
(Denmark) A Bøje (Denmark) A Magelund	21	21
7	(Indonesia) A Rahayu (Indonesia) S F S Ramadhanti	20	21	7
(Malaysia) P Tan (Malaysia) Thinaah M	22	19	21
PFR	(Germany) S Küspert (Germany) E Moszczynski	21	9	13
(Indonesia) F D Kusuma (Indonesia) A C Pratiwi	18	21	21

Second round
3	(Japan) N Matsuyama (Japan) C Shida	21	21
(Denmark) A Bøje (Denmark) A Magelund	18	7
(Malaysia) P Tan (Malaysia) Thinaah M	21	21
(Indonesia) F D Kusuma (Indonesia) A C Pratiwi	16	14

Quarter-finals
3	(Japan) N Matsuyama (Japan) C Shida	21	14	14
(Malaysia) P Tan (Malaysia) Thinaah M	15	21	21

=== Bottom half ===
==== Section 3 ====
First round
(Scotland) J MacPherson (Scotland) C Torrance	6	21	21
(Malaysia) V Hoo (Malaysia) Lim C S	21	13	18
(Netherlands) D Jille (Netherlands) C Seinen	14	16
8	(South Korea) Jeong N-e (South Korea) Kim H-j	21	21
(Thailand) B Aimsaard (Thailand) N Aimsaard	21	21
(Germany) L Efler (Germany) I Lohau	15	15
(Canada) R Honderich (Canada) K Tsai	15	18
4	(Japan) M Matsumoto (Japan) W Nagahara	21	21

Second round
(Scotland) J MacPherson (Scotland) C Torrance	9	16
8	(South Korea) Jeong N-e (South Korea) Kim H-j	21	21
(Thailand) B Aimsaard (Thailand) N Aimsaard	21	7	8
4	(Japan) M Matsumoto (Japan) W Nagahara	17	21	21

Quarter-finals
8	(South Korea) Jeong N-e (South Korea) Kim H-j	15	21
4	(Japan) M Matsumoto (Japan) W Nagahara	21	23

==== Section 4 ====
First round
PFR	(Ukraine) M Stoliarenko (Ukraine) Y Zharka	11	9
(Denmark) M Fruergaard (Denmark) S Thygesen	21	21
PFR	(Estonia) K-K Marran (Estonia) H Rüütel	11	9
5	(Japan) Y Fukushima (Japan) S Hirota	21	21
(China) Liu XX (China) Xia YT	24	21
(Hong Kong) Yeung N T (Hong Kong) Yeung P L	22	12
(France) M Lambert (France) A Tran	15	16
2	(South Korea) Kim S-y (South Korea) Kong H-y	21	21

Second round
(Denmark) M Fruergaard (Denmark) S Thygesen
5	(Japan) Y Fukushima (Japan) S Hirota	w	/	o
(China) Liu XX (China) Xia YT	15	18
2	(South Korea) Kim S-y (South Korea) Kong H-y	21	21

Quarter-finals
5	(Japan) Y Fukushima (Japan) S Hirota	12	23	21
2	(South Korea) Kim S-y (South Korea) Kong H-y	21	21	19

== Mixed doubles ==
=== Seeds ===
1. (Thailand) Dechapol Puavaranukroh / Sapsiree Taerattanachai (first round)
2. (Japan) Yuta Watanabe / Arisa Higashino (withdrew)
3. (China) Zheng Siwei / Huang Yaqiong (champions)
4. (Hong Kong) Tang Chun Man / Tse Ying Suet (withdrew)
5. (South Korea) Seo Seung-jae / Chae Yoo-jung (quarter-finals)
6. (France) Thom Gicquel / Delphine Delrue (quarter-finals)
7. (Germany) Mark Lamsfuß / Isabel Lohau (semi-finals)
8. (Malaysia) Tan Kian Meng / Lai Pei Jing (second round)

=== Finals ===
Semi-finals
7	(Germany) Mark Lamsfuß (Germany) Isabel Lohau	16	16
3	(China) Zheng Siwei (China) Huang Yaqiong	21	21
(Netherlands) Robin Tabeling (Netherlands) Selena Piek	17	21	21
(Indonesia) Rehan Naufal Kusharjanto (Indonesia) Lisa Ayu Kusumawati	21	13	12

Final
3	(China) Zheng Siwei (China) Huang Yaqiong	21	14	22
(Netherlands) Robin Tabeling (Netherlands) Selena Piek	16	21	20

=== Top half ===
==== Section 1 ====
First round
1	(Thailand) D Puavaranukroh (Thailand) S Taerattanachai	14	21	14
(China) Feng YZ (China) Huang DP	21	14	21
(India) I Bhatnagar (India) T Crasto	13	16
(Japan) K Yamashita (Japan) N Shinoya	21	21
7	(Germany) M Lamsfuß (Germany) I Lohau	21	21
(Germany) J R Jansen (Germany) L Efler	15	13
(Thailand) S Jomkoh (Thailand) S Paewsampran	19	19
(Indonesia) Z J Sumanti (Indonesia) H Julimarbela	21	21

Second round
(China) Feng YZ (China) Huang DP	21	21
(Japan) K Yamashita (Japan) N Shinoya	11	12
7	(Germany) M Lamsfuß (Germany) I Lohau	21	21
(Indonesia) Z J Sumanti (Indonesia) H Julimarbela	19	17

Quarter-finals
(China) Feng YZ (China) Huang DP	21	16	18
7	(Germany) M Lamsfuß (Germany) I Lohau	15	21	21

==== Section 2 ====
First round
3	(China) Zheng SW (China) Huang YQ	21	21
(Denmark) M Mikkelsen (Denmark) R Søby Hansen	11	12
(Scotland) A Hall (Scotland) J MacPherson	18	22
(Denmark) M Christiansen (Denmark) A Bøje	21	24
8	(Malaysia) Tan K M (Malaysia) Lai P J	8	22	24
(China) Guo XW (China) Zhang SX	21	20	22
(Malaysia) Chan P S (Malaysia) Cheah Y S	18	17
(Japan) Y Kaneko (Japan) M Matsutomo	21	21

Second round
3	(China) Zheng SW (China) Huang YQ	23	21	21
(Denmark) M Christiansen (Denmark) A Bøje	25	14	10
8	(Malaysia) Tan K M (Malaysia) Lai P J	12	21	15
(Japan) Y Kaneko (Japan) M Matsutomo	21	14	21

Quarter-finals
3	(China) Zheng SW (China) Huang YQ	21	21
(Japan) Y Kaneko (Japan) M Matsutomo	10	8

=== Bottom half ===
==== Section 3 ====
First round
(South Korea) Kim W-h (South Korea) Jeong N-e	15	13
(Indonesia) R Rivaldy (Indonesia) P H Mentari	21	21
(Chinese Taipei) Yang P-hs (Chinese Taipei) Hu L-f	14	18
5	(South Korea) Seo S-j (South Korea) Chae Y-j	21	21
(Netherlands) R Tabeling (Netherlands) S Piek	21	21
(England) C Hemming (England) J Pugh	16	15
(Malaysia) Hoo P R (Malaysia) Toh E W	18	17
PFR	(South Korea) Jin Y (South Korea) Shin S-c	21	21

Second round
(Indonesia) R Rivaldy (Indonesia) P H Mentari	18	11
5	(South Korea) Seo S-j (South Korea) Chae Y-j	21	21
(Netherlands) R Tabeling (Netherlands) S Piek	21	21
PFR	(South Korea) Jin Y (South Korea) Shin S-c	15	17

Quarter-finals
5	(South Korea) Seo S-j (South Korea) Chae Y-j	9	21	8
(Netherlands) R Tabeling (Netherlands) S Piek	21	13	21

==== Section 4 ====
First round
(Hong Kong) Lee C H (Hong Kong) Ng T Y	21	21
(South Korea) Kim Y-h (South Korea) Lee Y-l	18	19
(Chinese Taipei) Lee J-h (Chinese Taipei) Hsu Y-c	12	22
6	(France) T Gicquel (France) D Delrue	21	24
(Malaysia) Goh S H (Malaysia) S J Lai	14	10
(Indonesia) R N Kusharjanto (Indonesia) L A Kusumawati	21	21
(Singapore) T Hee (Singapore) J Tan	21	21
PFR	(France) W Villeger (France) A Tran	14	12

Second round
(Hong Kong) Lee C H (Hong Kong) Ng T Y	17	22
6	(France) T Gicquel (France) D Delrue	21	24
(Indonesia) R N Kusharjanto (Indonesia) L A Kusumawati	21	19	21
(Singapore) T Hee (Singapore) J Tan	14	21	16

Quarter-finals
6	(France) T Gicquel (France) D Delrue	21	15	17
(Indonesia) R N Kusharjanto (Indonesia) L A Kusumawati	14	21	21

Preceded by 2021 French Open	French Open	Succeeded by 2023 French Open
Preceded by 2022 Denmark Open	BWF World Tour; 2022 BWF season	Succeeded by 2022 Hylo Open
