= Badminton Denmark =

Denmark's governing body for badminton

Badminton Denmark Badminton Danmark
- Formation: 15 January 1930
- Type: National Sport Association
- Headquarters: Brøndby
- Director: Kristian Langbak
- Affiliations: BEC, BWF
- Website: badminton.dk

Badminton Denmark is the national governing body for the sport of badminton in Denmark. The organization represents above 700 clubs as of 2023. The highest authority in Badminton Denmark is the assembly where each member club is represented. The board of directors' duty is to ensure the organisation moves in the direction that the assembly decided. There is an administration that runs the organisation day-to-day. The organization maintains the rules of badminton for Denmark, usually in line with those of the Badminton World Federation.

Badminton Denmark operates two elite centers where elite players can go to train under the supervision of such greats as Morten Frost and Thomas Stuer-Lauridsen. There is also a center for the development of youth players run by Lotte Olsen.

In addition to overseeing the national club competitions and running the national championship tournaments (including youth and senior championships), Badminton Denmark organises international tournaments.

== History ==
Badminton Denmark was established on 15 January 1930 as Denmark's Badminton Union (Danish: Dansk Badminton Union) by representatives from Skovshoved, Copenhagen BK, Neyes BK, Helsingør BK, Stubbekøbing IF and Roskilde BK. In order to avoid confusion with Danish Football Association (Danish: Dansk Boldspil Union) which also uses the initial DBU, the name was later changed to Danish Badminton Federation (Danish: Dansk Badminton Forbund).

== Tournaments ==
- Denmark Open, an annual open tournament that attracts the world's elite players.
- Copenhagen Masters, an annual invitational tournament played between Christmas and New Year
