= Chirag Shetty =

Indian badminton player (born 1997)

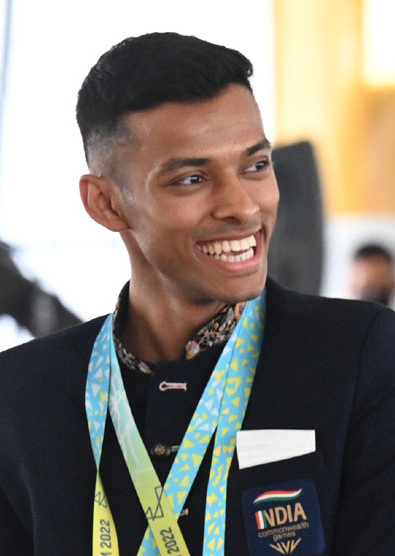
- Shetty in 2022

Personal information
- Born: 4 July 1997 (age 29) Mumbai, Maharashtra, India
- Height: 1.87 m (6 ft 2 in)
- Weight: 75 kg (165 lb)

Sport
- Country: India
- Sport: Badminton
- Handedness: Right
- Coached by: Tan Kim Her and Mathias Boe

Men's doubles
- Highest ranking: 1 (with Satwiksairaj Rankireddy, 10 October 2023)
- Current ranking: 6 (with Satwiksairaj Rankireddy, 10 November 2026)
- Honours: Khel Ratna Award; Arjuna Award
- BWF profile
Medal record
Men's badminton
Representing India
World Championships
Bronze medal – third place	2022 Tokyo	Men's doubles
Bronze medal – third place	2025 Paris	Men's doubles
Thomas Cup
Gold medal – first place	2022 Bangkok	Men's team
Bronze medal – third place	2026 Horsens	Men's team
Commonwealth Games
Gold medal – first place	2018 Gold Coast	Mixed team
Gold medal – first place	2022 Birmingham	Men's doubles
Silver medal – second place	2018 Gold Coast	Men's doubles
Silver medal – second place	2022 Birmingham	Mixed team
Asian Games
Gold medal – first place	2022 Hangzhou	Men's doubles
Silver medal – second place	2022 Hangzhou	Men's team
Bronze medal – third place	2026 Aichi–Nagoya	Men's team
Asian Championships
Gold medal – first place	2023 Dubai	Men's doubles
Asia Mixed Team Championships
Bronze medal – third place	2023 Dubai	Mixed team
Asia Team Championships
Bronze medal – third place	2016 Hyderabad	Men's team
Bronze medal – third place	2020 Manila	Men's team

Chirag Shetty (born 4 July 1997) is an Indian badminton player. With his doubles partner Satwiksairaj Rankireddy, he has won double bronze medals at the World Championships as well as gold medals at the Asian Games, Asian Championships and Commonwealth Games. Shetty and Rankireddy are the only Indian doubles pair to reach number 1 in the world ranking and win the World Tour Super 1000. They are also the first Indians to win a gold at the Asian Games in badminton.

== Early life ==
Shetty was born on 4 July 1997 in Malad, Mumbai to a Tulu family. His parents are Sujata and Chandrashekhar Shetty and his father is a hotelier. He started training at the Uday Pawar Badminton Academy at the Goregaon Sports Club, but shifted to the Gopichand Badminton Academy, Hyderabad.

Shetty initially partnered with Arjun M. R., but was later paired with Satwiksairaj Rankireddy by coach Tan Kim Her who felt that two tall, strong guys with skills could combine to become a formidable pair.

== Career ==
=== 2018 ===
In 2018, Shetty and Rankireddy played a crucial role in earning India a historic gold medal in the mixed team event at the 2018 Commonwealth Games, where they also won the men's doubles silver. They won their first BWF World Tour title in Hyderabad Open after beating the Indonesian pair of Akbar Bintang Cahyono and Muhammad Reza Pahlevi Isfahani in the final.

=== 2019 ===
In 2019, Shetty and Rankireddy became the first Indian doubles pair to win a BWF Superseries or BWF World Tour (Super 500+) title, when they won the Thailand Open title, beating the Chinese pair of Li Junhui and Liu Yuchen in the final. They followed it up with a runner-up finish at the French Open, where they lost in the final to the world number 1 pairing of Marcus Fernaldi Gideon and Kevin Sanjaya Sukamuljo.

=== 2021 ===
In 2021, Shetty and Rankireddy lost to the Indonesian duo of Mohammad Ahsan and Hendra Setiawan in the second round to crash out of the 2020 Yonex Thailand Open. In July, he and Rankireddy competed at the 2020 Summer Olympics, but were eliminated in the group stage, following a loss to Marcus Fernaldi Gideon and Kevin Sanjaya Sukamuljo. However, they were the only pair in the entire tournament who defeated eventual gold medalists Lee Yang and Wang Chi-Lin, whom they had narrowly beat in their first group stage encounter. In December, Shetty and Rankireddy qualified for the BWF World Tour Finals for the first time in their career, but withdrew from the tournament after a loss in their first group stage match to the Danish pair of Kim Astrup and Anders Skaarup Rasmussen.

=== 2022 ===
In 2022, Shetty and Rankireddy started the year by winning India Open. They were also part of India's Thomas Cup winning team. In the final, having lost the first game to the Indonesian duo of Kevin Sanjaya Sukamuljo and Mohammad Ahsan, they displayed immense perseverance and tenacity to win the second game and close out the third game at 21–19, giving India a 2–0 lead over Indonesia. This was pivotal in helping India bag its maiden Thomas Cup trophy. Shetty and Rankireddy then won the men's doubles gold at the Commonwealth Games, beating the home pair of Ben Lane and Sean Vendy in the final. At the BWF World Championships, Shetty and Rankireddy won a bronze medal, India's first-ever men's doubles medal at the tournament. They beat defending champions Takuro Hoki and Yugo Kobayashi in the quarterfinals, but lost in the semi-finals to eventual champions Aaron Chia and Soh Wooi Yik. Shetty and Rankireddy won the French Open making it their first Super 750 title in their career by beating Lu Ching-yao and Yang Po-han in the finals.

=== 2023 ===
In February, Shetty was a member of the Indian team which clinched the bronze medal at Asia Mixed Team Championships. Shetty and Rankireddy won their first title as a pair in the 2023 Swiss Open (badminton), beating Ren Xiangyu and Tan Qiang in the final. The duo also crowned as Asian Champion after winning the 2023 Badminton Asia Championships held in Dubai. They won their first BWF World Tour Super 1000 title by defeating Aaron Chia and Soh Wooi Yik in the final of Indonesia Open, thus becoming the first men's doubles pair from India to win the event. The duo went on to win Korea Open defeating Indonesian Pair Fajar Alfian and Muhammad Rian Ardianto.

=== 2024 ===
Partnered with Rankireddy, he reached the final of Super 1000 event of Malaysia Open and lost to the Chinese pair of Liang Weikeng and Wang Chang. Then they reached another final this year at India Open and again reached finals but lost to the Korean pair of Kang Min-hyuk and Seo Seung-jae in a tough game. Then they finally achieved success by winning their first tour of this year in Super 750 event of French Open defeating Lee Jhe-huei and Yang Po-hsuan in straight games easily.

At the Singapore Open, Shetty and Rankireddy suffered a first round exit to a Danish pair in straight games.

=== 2025 ===
Malaysian coach Tan Kim Her who identified and paired Shetty with Rankireddy returned as their coach again. In the Malaysia and India Open, they reached the semi-finals.

== Awards and nominations ==
Year	Award	Category	Result	Ref(s)
2018	BWF Awards	Most Improved Players	Nominated	
2019	BWF Awards	Most Improved Players	Nominated	
2020	Arjuna Award	Good Performance in the Field of Sports	Won	
2023	Khel Ratna Award	Spectacular Performance in the Field of Sports	Won	
2023	BWF Awards	Men's Doubles Pair of the Year	Nominated	
2025	Times of India Sports Awards	Badminton Player of the Year Male	TBA	

== Achievements ==
=== World Championships ===
Year	Venue	Partner	Opponent	Score	Result
2022	Tokyo Metropolitan Gymnasium, Tokyo, Japan	(India) Satwiksairaj Rankireddy	(Malaysia) Aaron Chia (Malaysia) Soh Wooi Yik	22–20, 18–21, 16–21	Bronze
2025	Adidas Arena, Paris, France	(India) Satwiksairaj Rankireddy	(China) Chen Boyang (China) Liu Yi	19–21, 21–18, 12–21	Bronze

=== Commonwealth Games ===
Year	Venue	Partner	Opponent	Score	Result
2018	Carrara Sports and Leisure Centre; Gold Coast, Australia	(India) Satwiksairaj Rankireddy	(England) Marcus Ellis (England) Chris Langridge	13–21, 16–21	Silver
2022	National Exhibition Centre, Birmingham, England	(India) Satwiksairaj Rankireddy	(England) Ben Lane (England) Sean Vendy	21–15, 21–13	Gold

=== Asian Games ===
Year	Venue	Partner	Opponent	Score	Result
2022	Binjiang Gymnasium, Hangzhou, China	(India) Satwiksairaj Rankireddy	(South Korea) Choi Sol-gyu (South Korea) Kim Won-ho	21–18, 21–16	Gold

=== Asian Championships ===
Year	Venue	Partner	Opponent	Score	Result
2023	Sheikh Rashid Bin Hamdan Indoor Hall; Dubai, United Arab Emirates	(India) Satwiksairaj Rankireddy	(Malaysia) Ong Yew Sin (Malaysia) Teo Ee Yi	16–21, 21–17, 21–19	Gold

=== World Tour (11 titles, 8 runners-up) ===
The BWF World Tour was announced on 19 March 2017 and implemented in 2018. It is a series of elite badminton tournaments sanctioned by the Badminton World Federation. The tour is divided into levels of World Tour Finals, Super 1000, Super 750, Super 500, Super 300, and Super 100.

Year	Tournament	Level	Partner	Opponent	Score	Result
2018	Hyderabad Open	Super 100	(India) Satwiksairaj Rankireddy	(Indonesia) Akbar Bintang Cahyono (Indonesia) Moh Reza Pahlevi Isfahani	21–16, 21–14	(gold) Winner
2018	Syed Modi International	Super 300	(India) Satwiksairaj Rankireddy	(Indonesia) Fajar Alfian (Indonesia) Muhammad Rian Ardianto	11–21, 20–22	(silver) Runner-up
2019	Thailand Open	Super 500	(India) Satwiksairaj Rankireddy	(China) Li Junhui (China) Liu Yuchen	21–19, 18–21, 21–18	(gold) Winner
2019	French Open	Super 750	(India) Satwiksairaj Rankireddy	(Indonesia) Marcus Fernaldi Gideon (Indonesia) Kevin Sanjaya Sukamuljo	18–21, 16–21	(silver) Runner-up
2022	India Open	Super 500	(India) Satwiksairaj Rankireddy	(Indonesia) Mohammad Ahsan (Indonesia) Hendra Setiawan	21–16, 26–24	(gold) Winner
2022	French Open	Super 750	(India) Satwiksairaj Rankireddy	(Chinese Taipei) Lu Ching-yao (Chinese Taipei) Yang Po-han	21–13, 21–19	(gold) Winner
2023	Swiss Open	Super 300	(India) Satwiksairaj Rankireddy	(China) Ren Xiangyu (China) Tan Qiang	21–19, 24–22	(gold) Winner
2023	Indonesia Open	Super 1000	(India) Satwiksairaj Rankireddy	(Malaysia) Aaron Chia (Malaysia) Soh Wooi Yik	21–17, 21–18	(gold) Winner
2023	Korea Open	Super 500	(India) Satwiksairaj Rankireddy	(Indonesia) Fajar Alfian (Indonesia) Muhammad Rian Ardianto	17–21, 21–13, 21–14	(gold) Winner
2023	China Masters	Super 750	(India) Satwiksairaj Rankireddy	(China) Liang Weikeng (China) Wang Chang	19–21, 21–18, 19–21	(silver) Runner-up
2024	Malaysia Open	Super 1000	(India) Satwiksairaj Rankireddy	(China) Liang Weikeng (China) Wang Chang	21–9, 18–21, 17–21	(silver) Runner-up
2024	India Open	Super 750	(India) Satwiksairaj Rankireddy	(South Korea) Kang Min-hyuk (South Korea) Seo Seung-jae	21–15, 11–21, 18–21	(silver) Runner-up
2024	French Open	Super 750	(India) Satwiksairaj Rankireddy	(Chinese Taipei) Lee Jhe-huei (Chinese Taipei) Yang Po-hsuan	21–11, 21–17	(gold) Winner
2024	Thailand Open	Super 500	(India) Satwiksairaj Rankireddy	(China) Chen Boyang (China) Liu Yi	21–15, 21–15	(gold) Winner
2025	Hong Kong Open	Super 500	(India) Satwiksairaj Rankireddy	(China) Liang Weikeng (China) Wang Chang	21–19, 14–21, 17–21	(silver) Runner-up
2025	China Masters	Super 750	(India) Satwiksairaj Rankireddy	(South Korea) Kim Won-ho (South Korea) Seo Seung-jae	19–21, 15–21	(silver) Runner-up
2026	Thailand Open	Super 500	(India) Satwiksairaj Rankireddy	(Indonesia) Leo Rolly Carnando (Indonesia) Daniel Marthin	12–21, 23–25	(silver) Runner-up
2026	Singapore Open	Super 750	(India) Satwiksairaj Rankireddy	(Indonesia) Fajar Alfian (Indonesia) Muhammad Shohibul Fikri	18–21, 21–17, 21–16	(gold) Winner
2026	China Masters	Super 750	(India) Satwiksairaj Rankireddy	(China) He Jiting (China) Ren Xiangyu	11–21, 21–13, 21–17	(gold) Winner

=== International Challenge / Series (6 titles) ===
Year	Tournament	Partner	Opponent	Score	Result
2016	Mauritius International	(India) Satwiksairaj Rankireddy	(India) Dhruv Kapila (India) Saurabh Sharma	21–12, 21–16	(gold) Winner
2016	India International Series	(India) Satwiksairaj Rankireddy	(Malaysia) Goh Sze Fei (Malaysia) Nur Izzuddin	8–11, 11–5, 7–11, 11–8, 11–5	(gold) Winner
2016	Tata Open India International	(India) Satwiksairaj Rankireddy	(India) Arjun M.R. (India) Ramchandran Shlok	10–12, 11–9, 11–7, 11–5	(gold) Winner
2016	Bangladesh International	(India) Satwiksairaj Rankireddy	(India) M. Anilkumar Raju (India) Venkat Gaurav Prasad	17–21, 21–7, 21–8	(gold) Winner
2017	Vietnam International	(India) Satwiksairaj Rankireddy	(Thailand) Trawut Potieng (Thailand) Nanthakarn Yordphaisong	17–21, 21–9, 21–15	(gold) Winner
2019	Brazil International	(India) Satwiksairaj Rankireddy	(Netherlands) Jelle Maas (Netherlands) Robin Tabeling	21–14, 21–18	(gold) Winner

BWF International Challenge tournament
BWF International Series tournament
BWF Future Series tournament

=== Junior International (3 titles, 3 runners-up) ===
Boys' doubles
Year	Tournament	Partner	Opponent	Score	Result
2013	India Junior International	(India) Arjun M. R.	(India) Aditya Joshi (India) Arun George	17–21, 12–21	(silver) Runner-up
2014	India Junior International	(India) Arjun M. R.	(India) Satwiksairaj Rankireddy (India) Krishna Prasad Garaga	11–7, 11–10, 11–6	(gold) Winner
2014	Belgian Junior International	(India) Arjun M. R.	(Scotland) Alexander Dunn (Scotland) Adam Hall	9–11, 11–2, 11–7	(gold) Winner
2014	Swiss Junior International	(India) Arjun M. R.	(England) Ben Lane (England) Sean Vendy	11–7, 11–8, 11–7	(gold) Winner

Mixed doubles
Year	Tournament	Partner	Opponent	Score	Result
2014	India Junior International	(India) Shruthi K. P.	(India) Arjun M. R. (India) Kuhoo Garg	8–11, 7–11, 11–5, 8–11	(silver) Runner-up
2015	India Junior International	(India) Sanjana Santosh	(Indonesia) Andika Ramadiansyah (Indonesia) Mychelle Crhystine Bandaso	13–21, 19–21	(silver) Runner-up

BWF Junior International Grand Prix tournament
BWF Junior International Challenge tournament
BWF Junior International Series tournament
BWF Junior Future Series tournament

== Record against opponents ==
Men's doubles results with Satwiksairaj Rankireddy against Year-end Finals finalists, World Championships semifinalists, and Olympic quarterfinalists. Accurate as of 21 October 2025.

Players	Matches	Results		Difference
Players	Matches	Won	Lost	Difference
(China) Fu Haifeng (China) Zhang Nan	1	0	1	–1
(China) Liang Weikeng (China) Wang Chang	12	4	9	–5
(China) Li Junhui (China) Liu Yuchen	3	2	1	+1
(China) Liu Cheng (China) Zhang Nan	1	0	1	–1
(China) He Jiting (China) Tan Qiang	2	1	1	0
(Chinese Taipei) Chen Hung-ling (Chinese Taipei) Wang Chi-lin	1	0	1	–1
(Chinese Taipei) Lee Yang (Chinese Taipei) Wang Chi-lin	4	2	2	0
(Denmark) Mathias Boe (Denmark) Carsten Mogensen	5	1	4	–3
(Denmark) Kim Astrup (Denmark) Anders Skaarup Rasmussen	10	4	6	–2
(England) Marcus Ellis (England) Chris Langridge	3	2	1	+1
(Indonesia) Mohammad Ahsan (Indonesia) Hendra Setiawan	8	4	4	0

Players	Matches	Results		Difference
Players	Matches	Won	Lost	Difference
(Indonesia) Fajar Alfian (Indonesia) Muhammad Rian Ardianto	6	4	2	+2
(Indonesia) Marcus Fernaldi Gideon (Indonesia) Kevin Sanjaya Sukamuljo	11	0	11	–11
(Japan) Takuro Hoki (Japan) Yugo Kobayashi	6	4	2	+2
(Japan) Hiroyuki Endo (Japan) Yuta Watanabe	4	2	2	0
(Japan) Takeshi Kamura (Japan) Keigo Sonoda	5	0	5	–5
(South Korea) Ko Sung-hyun (South Korea) Shin Baek-cheol	1	1	0	+1
(South Korea) Seo Seung-jae (South Korea) Kang Min-hyuk	8	5	3	+2
(Malaysia) Aaron Chia (Malaysia) Soh Wooi Yik	17	6	11	–5
(Malaysia) Goh V Shem (Malaysia) Tan Wee Kiong	2	0	2	–2
(Malaysia) Ong Yew Sin (Malaysia) Teo Ee Yi	10	7	3	+4
(Malaysia) Goh Sze Fei (Malaysia) Nur Izzudin	10	8	2	+6

== See also ==
- Badminton in India
- India national badminton team
