= Badminton at the 2024 Summer Olympics – Men's singles =

Men's singles badminton tournament

Men's singles at the Games of the XXXIII Olympiad
- Venue: Porte de La Chapelle Arena
- Dates: 27 July – 5 August 2024
- Competitors: 41 from 36 nations

Medalists
1st place, gold medalist(s)		Viktor Axelsen	Denmark
2nd place, silver medalist(s)		Kunlavut Vitidsarn	Thailand
3rd place, bronze medalist(s)		Lee Zii Jia	Malaysia

The men's singles badminton tournament at the 2024 Summer Olympics took place from 27 July to 5 August 2024 at the Porte de La Chapelle Arena in Paris. A total of 41 players from 36 nations competed at the tournament.

Viktor Axelsen of Denmark successfully retained his title, defeating Thailand's Kunlavut Vitidsarn 21–11, 21–11, to win the gold medal in men's singles badminton at the 2024 Summer Olympics. Axelsen became the first men's singles player to defend his Olympic title since Lin Dan in 2012, and concurrently became the first European player to win back-to-back Olympic gold medals in badminton. For a second consecutive Olympics, Axelsen did not lose a game during the tournament. Vitidsarn also became the first Thai player to win an Olympic badminton medal.

In the bronze-medal match, Malaysia's Lee Zii Jia defeated India's Lakshya Sen, 13–21, 21–16, 21–11. Lee became the third men's singles player from Malaysia to win an Olympic badminton medal (after Rashid Sidek and Lee Chong Wei), and subsequently won Malaysia's second bronze medal at the 2024 Olympics (after Aaron Chia and Soh Wooi Yik in the men's doubles event).

== Format ==
The 41 players were split into 13 groups of three to four players. They played a round-robin tournament with the top-placed player advancing to the knockout stage. Each match was played in a best-of-3.

== Schedule ==
The schedule was as follows.

Legend

P	Preliminaries	R	Round of 16	QF	Quarter-finals	SF	Semi-finals	M	Medal matches

27 Jul	28 Jul	29 Jul	30 Jul	31 Jul	1 Aug	2 Aug	3 Aug	4 Aug	5 Aug
P					R	QF		SF	M

== Draw ==
The draw was held on 12 July 2024.

== Seeds ==
The top 13 players of the BWF World Ranking were seeded.

1. Shi Yuqi (CHN) (quarter-finals)
2. Viktor Axelsen (DEN) (gold medalist)
3. Jonatan Christie (INA) (group stage)
4. Anders Antonsen (DEN) (quarter-finals)
5. Kodai Naraoka (JPN) (round of 16)
6. Li Shifeng (CHN) (round of 16)
7. Lee Zii Jia (MAS) (bronze medalist)
8. Kunlavut Vitidsarn (THA) (silver medalist)
9. Anthony Sinisuka Ginting (INA) (group stage)
10. Loh Kean Yew (SGP) (quarter-finals)
11. Kenta Nishimoto (JPN) (round of 16)
12. Chou Tien-chen (TPE) (quarter-finals)
13. Prannoy H. S. (IND) (round of 16)

== Group stage ==
All times are local (UTC+2).

=== Group A ===
Pos	Team	Pld	W	L	GF	GA	GD	PF	PA	PD	Pts	Qualification
1	Shi Yuqi (CHN)	1	1	0	2	0	+2	42	19	+23	1	Quarter-finals
2	Giovanni Toti (ITA)	1	0	1	0	2	−2	19	42	−23	0	
3	Sören Opti (SUR) (Note: Sören Opti withdrew during the tournament.)	0	0	0	0	0	0	0	0	0	0	Withdrew

Source: Olympics
Notes:

Date	Time	Player 1	Score	Player 2	Set 1	Set 2	Set 3	Report
27 July	11:00	Shi Yuqi (China)	~~2–0~~	(Suriname) Sören Opti	~~21–5~~	~~21–7~~		Report
29 July	10:10	Giovanni Toti (Italy)	Retired	(Suriname) Sören Opti	~~21–8~~	~~4–1^{r}~~		Report
31 July	10:10	Shi Yuqi (China)	2–0	(Italy) Giovanni Toti	21–9	21–10		Report

=== Group C ===
Pos	Team	Pld	W	L	GF	GA	GD	PF	PA	PD	Pts	Qualification
1	Kunlavut Vitidsarn (THA)	1	1	0	2	0	+2	42	21	+21	1	Round of 16
2	Julien Paul (MRI)	1	0	1	0	2	−2	21	42	−21	0	
3	Kalle Koljonen (FIN) (Note: Kalle Koljonen withdrew during the tournament.)	0	0	0	0	0	0	0	0	0	0	Withdrew

Source: Olympics
Notes:

Date	Time	Player 1	Score	Player 2	Set 1	Set 2	Set 3	Report
27 July	11:00	Kunlavut Vitidsarn (Thailand)	2–0	(Mauritius) Julien Paul	21–9	21–12		Report
29 July	09:20	Kalle Koljonen (Finland)	~~2–0~~	(Mauritius) Julien Paul	~~21–9~~	~~21–10~~		Report
31 July	10:10	Kunlavut Vitidsarn (Thailand)	Retired	(Finland) Kalle Koljonen	~~21–4~~	~~8–0^{r}~~		Report

=== Group D ===
Pos	Team	Pld	W	L	GF	GA	GD	PF	PA	PD	Pts	Qualification
1	Kenta Nishimoto (JPN)	2	2	0	4	0	+4	84	48	+36	2	Round of 16
2	Brian Yang (CAN)	2	1	1	2	2	0	74	70	+4	1	
3	Dmitriy Panarin (KAZ)	2	0	2	0	4	−4	44	84	−40	0	

Source: Olympics

Date	Time	Player 1	Score	Player 2	Set 1	Set 2	Set 3	Report
28 July	08:30	Kenta Nishimoto (Japan)	2–0	(Kazakhstan) Dmitriy Panarin	21–5	21–11		Report
29 July	15:40	Brian Yang (Canada)	2–0	(Kazakhstan) Dmitriy Panarin	21–18	21–10		Report
31 July	14:50	Kenta Nishimoto (Japan)	2–0	(Canada) Brian Yang	21–14	21–18		Report

=== Group E ===
Pos	Team	Pld	W	L	GF	GA	GD	PF	PA	PD	Pts	Qualification
1	Anders Antonsen (DEN)	2	2	0	4	0	+4	84	52	+32	2	Quarter-finals
2	Ade Resky Dwicahyo (AZE)	2	1	1	2	2	0	66	71	−5	1	
3	Collins Valentine Filimon (AUT)	2	0	2	0	4	−4	57	84	−27	0	

Source: Olympics

Date	Time	Player 1	Score	Player 2	Set 1	Set 2	Set 3	Report
28 July	19:30	Anders Antonsen (Denmark)	2–0	(Austria) Collins Valentine Filimon	21–10	21–18		Report
29 July	20:20	Ade Resky Dwicahyo (Azerbaijan)	2–0	(Austria) Collins Valentine Filimon	21–18	21–11		Report
31 July	16:30	Anders Antonsen (Denmark)	2–0	(Azerbaijan) Ade Resky Dwicahyo	21–10	21–14		Report

=== Group G ===
Pos	Team	Pld	W	L	GF	GA	GD	PF	PA	PD	Pts	Qualification
1	Lee Zii Jia (MAS)	2	2	0	4	0	+4	84	49	+35	2	Round of 16
2	Pablo Abián (ESP)	2	1	1	2	2	0	65	70	−5	1	
3	Viren Nettasinghe (SRI)	2	0	2	0	4	−4	54	84	−30	0	

Source: Olympics

Date	Time	Player 1	Score	Player 2	Set 1	Set 2	Set 3	Report
28 July	10:10	Lee Zii Jia (Malaysia)	2–0	(Sri Lanka) Viren Nettasinghe	21–14	21–12		Report
30 July	08:30	Pablo Abián (Spain)	2–0	(Sri Lanka) Viren Nettasinghe	21–9	21–19		Report
31 July	14:50	Lee Zii Jia (Malaysia)	2–0	(Spain) Pablo Abián	21–10	21–13		Report

=== Group H ===
Pos	Team	Pld	W	L	GF	GA	GD	PF	PA	PD	Pts	Qualification
1	Toma Junior Popov (FRA) (H)	2	2	0	4	1	+3	101	78	+23	2	Round of 16
2	Anthony Sinisuka Ginting (INA)	2	1	1	3	2	+1	97	81	+16	1	
3	Howard Shu (USA)	2	0	2	0	4	−4	45	84	−39	0	

Source: Olympics
(H) Host

Date	Time	Player 1	Score	Player 2	Set 1	Set 2	Set 3	Report
28 July	14:00	Anthony Sinisuka Ginting (Indonesia)	2–0	(United States) Howard Shu	21–14	21–8		Report
30 July	10:10	Toma Junior Popov (France)	2–0	(United States) Howard Shu	21–11	21–12		Report
31 July	16:30	Anthony Sinisuka Ginting (Indonesia)	1–2	(France) Toma Junior Popov	19–21	21–17	15–21	Report

=== Group I ===
Pos	Team	Pld	W	L	GF	GA	GD	PF	PA	PD	Pts	Qualification
1	Chou Tien-chen (TPE)	2	2	0	4	0	+4	84	61	+23	2	Round of 16
2	Lee Cheuk Yiu (HKG)	2	1	1	2	3	−1	88	85	+3	1	
3	Luis Ramón Garrido (MEX)	2	0	2	1	4	−3	73	99	−26	0	

Source: Olympics

Date	Time	Player 1	Score	Player 2	Set 1	Set 2	Set 3	Report
28 July	16:30	Chou Tien-chen (Chinese Taipei)	2–0	(Mexico) Luis Ramón Garrido	21–17	21–13		Report
30 July	15:40	Lee Cheuk Yiu (Hong Kong)	2–1	(Mexico) Luis Ramón Garrido	21–5	15–21	21–17	Report
31 July	15:40	Chou Tien-chen (Chinese Taipei)	2–0	(Hong Kong) Lee Cheuk Yiu	21–18	21–13		Report

=== Group J ===
Pos	Team	Pld	W	L	GF	GA	GD	PF	PA	PD	Pts	Qualification
1	Kodai Naraoka (JPN)	2	2	0	4	0	+4	84	61	+23	2	Round of 16
2	Jeon Hyeok-jin (KOR)	2	1	1	2	2	0	68	73	−5	1	
3	Ygor Coelho (BRA)	2	0	2	0	4	−4	66	84	−18	0	

Source: Olympics

Date	Time	Player 1	Score	Player 2	Set 1	Set 2	Set 3	Report
28 July	15:40	Kodai Naraoka (Japan)	2–0	(Brazil) Ygor Coelho	21–16	21–19		Report
30 July	14:50	Jeon Hyeok-jin (South Korea)	2–0	(Brazil) Ygor Coelho	21–12	21–19		Report
31 July	16:30	Kodai Naraoka (Japan)	2–0	(South Korea) Jeon Hyeok-jin	21–10	21–16		Report

=== Group K ===
Pos	Team	Pld	W	L	GF	GA	GD	PF	PA	PD	Pts	Qualification
1	Prannoy H. S. (IND)	2	2	0	4	1	+3	100	74	+26	2	Round of 16
2	Lê Đức Phát (VIE)	2	1	1	3	2	+1	86	78	+8	1	
3	Fabian Roth (GER)	2	0	2	0	4	−4	50	84	−34	0	

Source: Olympics

Date	Time	Player 1	Score	Player 2	Set 1	Set 2	Set 3	Report
28 July	16:30	Prannoy H. S. (India)	2–0	(Germany) Fabian Roth	21–18	21–12		Report
30 July	20:20	Lê Đức Phát (Vietnam)	2–0	(Germany) Fabian Roth	21–10	21–10		Report
31 July	19:30	Prannoy H. S. (India)	2–1	(Vietnam) Lê Đức Phát	16–21	21–11	21–12	Report

=== Group L ===
Pos	Team	Pld	W	L	GF	GA	GD	PF	PA	PD	Pts	Qualification
1	Lakshya Sen (IND)	2	2	0	4	0	+4	84	63	+21	2	Round of 16
2	Jonatan Christie (INA)	2	1	1	2	3	−1	90	90	0	1	
3	Julien Carraggi (BEL)	2	0	2	1	4	−3	81	102	−21	0	
4	Kevin Cordón (GUA) (Note: Kevin Cordon withdrew during the tournament.)	0	0	0	0	0	0	0	0	0	0	Withdrew

Source: Olympics
Notes:

Date	Time	Player 1	Score	Player 2	Set 1	Set 2	Set 3	Report
27 July	15:40	Lakshya Sen (India)	~~2–0~~	(Guatemala) Kevin Cordón	~~21–8~~	~~22–20~~		Report
27 July	16:30	Jonatan Christie (Indonesia)	2–1	(Belgium) Julien Carraggi	18–21	21–11	21–16	Report
29 July	14:00	Lakshya Sen (India)	2–0	(Belgium) Julien Carraggi	21–19	21–14		Report
31 July	10:10	Jonatan Christie (Indonesia)	0–2	(India) Lakshya Sen	18–21	12–21		Report

=== Group M ===
Pos	Team	Pld	W	L	GF	GA	GD	PF	PA	PD	Pts	Qualification
1	Loh Kean Yew (SGP)	2	2	0	4	0	+4	84	52	+32	2	Round of 16
2	Jan Louda (CZE)	2	1	1	2	2	0	65	64	+1	1	
3	Uriel Canjura (ESA)	2	0	2	0	4	−4	51	84	−33	0	

Source: Olympics

Date	Time	Player 1	Score	Player 2	Set 1	Set 2	Set 3	Report
28 July	20:20	Loh Kean Yew (Singapore)	2–0	(Czech Republic) Jan Louda	21–13	21–10		Report
30 July	19:30	Uriel Canjura (El Salvador)	0–2	(Czech Republic) Jan Louda	12–21	10–21		Report
31 July	20:20	Loh Kean Yew (Singapore)	2–0	(El Salvador) Uriel Canjura	21–13	21–16		Report

=== Group N ===
Pos	Team	Pld	W	L	GF	GA	GD	PF	PA	PD	Pts	Qualification
1	Li Shifeng (CHN)	2	2	0	4	0	+4	84	60	+24	2	Round of 16
2	Tobias Künzi (SUI)	2	1	1	2	2	0	69	76	−7	1	
3	Anuoluwapo Juwon Opeyori (NGR)	2	0	2	0	4	−4	68	85	−17	0	

Source: Olympics

Date	Time	Player 1	Score	Player 2	Set 1	Set 2	Set 3	Report
28 July	11:00	Li Shifeng (China)	2–0	(Switzerland) Tobias Künzi	21–13	21–13		Report
30 July	19:30	Anuoluwapo Juwon Opeyori (Nigeria)	0–2	(Switzerland) Tobias Künzi	20–22	14–21		Report
31 July	20:20	Li Shifeng (China)	2–0	(Nigeria) Anuoluwapo Juwon Opeyori	21–17	21–17		Report

=== Group P ===
Pos	Team	Pld	W	L	GF	GA	GD	PF	PA	PD	Pts	Qualification
1	Viktor Axelsen (DEN)	3	3	0	6	0	+6	126	57	+69	3	Quarter-finals
2	Nhat Nguyen (IRL)	3	2	1	4	3	+1	126	105	+21	2	
3	Misha Zilberman (ISR)	3	1	2	3	4	−1	113	125	−12	1	
4	Prince Dahal (NEP)	3	0	3	0	6	−6	48	126	−78	0	

Source: Olympics

Date	Time	Player 1	Score	Player 2	Set 1	Set 2	Set 3	Report
27 July	21:10	Nhat Nguyen (Republic of Ireland)	2–1	(Israel) Misha Zilberman	21–17	19–21	21–13	Report
27 July	21:10	Viktor Axelsen (Denmark)	2–0	(Nepal) Prince Dahal	21–8	21–6		Report
29 July	21:10	Nhat Nguyen (Republic of Ireland)	2–0	(Nepal) Prince Dahal	21–7	21–5		Report
29 July	22:00	Viktor Axelsen (Denmark)	2–0	(Israel) Misha Zilberman	21–9	21–11		Report
31 July	09:20	Misha Zilberman (Israel)	2–0	(Nepal) Prince Dahal	21–12	21–10		Report
31 July	09:20	Viktor Axelsen (Denmark)	2–0	(Republic of Ireland) Nhat Nguyen	21–13	21–10		Report

== Knockout stage ==
Round of 16
C1	Kunlavut Vitidsarn (THA)	16	21	21
D1	Kenta Nishimoto (JPN)	21	14	12
G1	Lee Zii Jia (MAS)	21	24
H1	Toma Junior Popov (FRA)	13	22
I1	Chou Tien-chen (TPE)	21	21
J1	Kodai Naraoka (JPN)	12	16
K1	Prannoy H. S. (IND)	12	6
L1	Lakshya Sen (IND)	21	21
M1	Loh Kean Yew (SGP)	23	21
N1	Li Shifeng (CHN)	21	15

Quarter-finals
A1	Shi Yuqi (CHN)	12	10
C1	Kunlavut Vitidsarn (THA)	21	21
E1	Anders Antonsen (DEN)	17	15
G1	Lee Zii Jia (MAS)	21	21
I1	Chou Tien-chen (TPE)	21	15	12
L1	Lakshya Sen (IND)	19	21	21
M1	Loh Kean Yew (SGP)	9	17
P1	Viktor Axelsen (DEN)	21	21

Semi-finals
C1	Kunlavut Vitidsarn (THA)	21	21
G1	Lee Zii Jia (MAS)	14	15
L1	Lakshya Sen (IND)	20	14
P1	Viktor Axelsen (DEN)	22	21

Gold medal match
C1	Kunlavut Vitidsarn (THA)	11	11
P1	Viktor Axelsen (DEN)	21	21
Bronze medal match
G1	Lee Zii Jia (MAS)	13	21	21
L1	Lakshya Sen (IND)	21	16	11
