= Denmark at the 2024 Summer Olympics =

Denmark at the Games of the XXXIII Olympiad in Paris

- IOC code: DEN
- NOC: National Olympic Committee and Sports Confederation of Denmark
- Website: www.dif.dk (in Danish and English)

in Paris, France 26 July 2024 – 11 August 2024
- Competitors: 123 (56 men and 67 women) in 20 sports
- Flag bearers (opening): Niklas Landin Jacobsen & Anne-Marie Rindom
- Flag bearers (closing): Turpal Bisultanov & Helena Rosendahl Bach
- Medals Ranked 29th: Gold 2 Silver 2 Bronze 5 Total 9

Summer Olympics appearances (overview)
- 1896; 1900; 1904; 1908; 1912; 1920; 1924; 1928; 1932; 1936; 1948; 1952; 1956; 1960; 1964; 1968; 1972; 1976; 1980; 1984; 1988; 1992; 1996; 2000; 2004; 2008; 2012; 2016; 2020; 2024

Other related appearances
- 1906 Intercalated Games

Denmark competed at the 2024 Summer Olympics in Paris from 26 July to 11 August 2024. Danish athletes have appeared in every edition of the Summer Olympic Games except for the sparsely attended St. Louis 1904. Before the start of the games, DIF sat an official medal goal of 9–11 medals for the 2024 Paris games.

== Medalists ==
Medal	Name	Sport	Event	Date
Gold	Viktor Axelsen	Badminton	Men's singles	5 August
Gold	Denmark men's national handball team: Lasse Andersson; Thomas Arnoldsen; Mathias Gidsel; Simon Hald; Mikkel Hansen; Emil Jakobsen; Lukas Jørgensen; Niclas Kirkeløkke; Magnus Landin; Niklas Landin; Rasmus Lauge; Hans Lindberg; Henrik Møllgaard; Emil Nielsen; Simon Pytlick; Magnus Saugstrup	Handball	Men's tournament	11 August
Silver	Cathrine Dufour; Nanna Skodborg Merrald; Daniel Bachmann Andersen	Equestrian	Team dressage	3 August
Silver	Anne-Marie Rindom	Sailing	ILCA 6	7 August
Bronze	Turpal Bisultanov	Wrestling	Men's Greco-Roman 87 kg	8 August
Bronze	Edi Hrnic	Taekwondo	Men's 80 kg	9 August
Bronze	Denmark women's national handball team: Louise Burgaard; Helena Elver; Emma Friis; Anne Mette Hansen; Line Haugsted; Kathrine Heindahl; Mie Højlund; Rikke Iversen; Sarah Iversen; Kristina Jørgensen; Michala Møller; Trine Østergaard; Althea Reinhardt; Mette Tranborg; Sandra Toft	Handball	Women's tournament	10 August
Bronze	Emma Aastrand Jørgensen	Canoeing	Women's K-1 500 m	10 August
Bronze	Michael Mørkøv; Niklas Larsen	Cycling	Men's Madison	10 August

Medals by sport
Sport	1st place, gold medalist(s)	2nd place, silver medalist(s)	3rd place, bronze medalist(s)	Total
Handball	1	0	1	2
Badminton	1	0	0	1
Equestrian	0	1	0	1
Sailing	0	1	0	1
Canoeing	0	0	1	1
Cycling	0	0	1	1
Taekwondo	0	0	1	1
Wrestling	0	0	1	1
Total	2	2	5	9

Medals by gender
Gender	1st place, gold medalist(s)	2nd place, silver medalist(s)	3rd place, bronze medalist(s)	Total
Male	2	0	3	5
Female	0	1	2	3
Mixed	0	1	0	1
Total	2	2	5	9

Medals by date
Date	1st place, gold medalist(s)	2nd place, silver medalist(s)	3rd place, bronze medalist(s)	Total
3 August	0	1	0	1
5 August	1	0	0	1
7 August	0	1	0	1
8 August	0	0	1	1
9 August	0	0	1	1
10 August	0	0	3	3
11 August	1	0	0	1
Total	2	2	5	9

== Competitors ==
The following is the list of number of competitors in the Games.

Sport	Men	Women	Total
Archery	0	1	1
Athletics	1	3	4
Badminton	4	3	7
Boxing	1	0	1
Canoeing	5	2	7
Cycling	9	8	17
Equestrian	3	2	5
Golf	2	2	4
Handball	16	15	31
Judo	0	1	1
Rowing	3	14	17
Sailing	5	4	9
Shooting	1	2	3
Skateboarding	1	0	1
Swimming	0	7	7
Table tennis	3	0	3
Taekwondo	1	0	1
Tennis	0	2	2
Triathlon	1	1	2
Wrestling	1	0	1
Total	56	67	123

== Archery ==
Denmark qualified one female archer to compete in the individual recurve event, through the final release of the Olympic ranking for Paris 2024.

Athlete	Event	Ranking round		Round of 64	Round of 32	Round of 16	Quarterfinals	Semifinals	Final / BM	
Athlete	Event	Score	Seed	Opposition Score	Opposition Score	Opposition Score	Opposition Score	Opposition Score	Opposition Score	Rank
Kirstine Danstrup Andersen	Women's individual	625	56	Li (CHN); L 0–6	Did not advance					33

== Athletics ==
Danish track and field athletes achieved the entry standards for Paris 2024 by world ranking, in the following events (a maximum of 3 athletes each):

Key

- Note–Ranks given for track events are within the athlete's heat only
- Q = Qualified for the next round
- q = Qualified for the next round as the fastest loser or, in field events, by position without achieving the qualifying target
- NR = National record
- N/A = Round not applicable for the event
- Bye = Athlete not required to compete in round

Track and road events

Athlete	Event	Preliminary		Heat		Repechage		Semifinal		Final	
Athlete	Event	Result	Rank	Result	Rank	Result	Rank	Result	Rank	Result	Rank
Simon Hansen	Men's 100 m	Bye		10.39	7	—N/a		Did not advance			
Ida Karstoft	Women's 200 m	—N/a		23.01	6	DNS		Did not advance			

Field events

Athlete	Event	Qualification		Final	
Athlete	Event	Result	Rank	Result	Rank
Lisa Brix Pedersen	Women's discus throw	59.81	24	Did not advance	
Katrine Koch Jacobsen	Women's hammer throw	73.04	5 Q	71.65	10

== Badminton ==
Initially Denmark entered nine badminton players into the Olympic tournament based on the BWF Race to Paris Rankings. On July 17 Mathias Christiansen withdrew from the Summer Olympics because he made unintentional errors in reporting his 'whereabouts' with Anti-Doping Denmark. Christiansen and his partner Alexandra Bøje were removed from group C in the mixed doubles draw.

Men

Athlete	Event	Group stage					Elimination	Quarter-final	Semi-final	Final / BM	
Athlete	Event	Opposition Score	Opposition Score	Opposition Score	Opposition Score	Rank	Opposition Score	Opposition Score	Opposition Score	Opposition Score	Rank
Viktor Axelsen	Singles	Dahal (NEP); W (21–8, 21–6)	Zilberman (ISR); W (21–9, 21–11)	Nguyen (IRL); W (21–13, 21–10)	—N/a	1 Q	Bye	Loh (SGP); W (21–9, 21–17)	Sen (IND); W (22–20, 21–14)	Vitidsarn (THA); W (21–11, 21–11)	1st place, gold medalist(s)
Anders Antonsen	Singles	Filimon (AUT); W (21–10, 21–18)	Dwicahyo (AZE); W (21–10, 21–14)	—N/a		1 Q	Bye	Lee (MAS); L (17–21, 15–21)	Did not advance		6
Kim Astrup; Anders Skaarup Rasmussen	Men's doubles	Chiu / Yuan (USA); W (21–13, 21–16)	Lee Y / Wang C-l (TPE); L (15–21, 21–19, 15–21)	Liu YC / Ou XY (CHN); W (21–15, 21–13)	Hoki / Kobayashi (JPN); W (21–19, 22–20)	2 Q	—N/a	Kang M-h/ Seo S-j (KOR); W (21–19, 22–20)	Lee Y / Wang C-l (TPE); L (21–18, 17–21, 10–21)	Chia / Soh (MAS); L (21–16, 20–22, 19–21)	4

Women

Athlete	Event	Group stage				Elimination	Quarter-final	Semi-final	Final / BM	
Athlete	Event	Opposition Score	Opposition Score	Opposition Score	Rank	Opposition Score	Opposition Score	Opposition Score	Opposition Score	Rank
Mia Blichfeldt	Women's singles	Li (GER); W (21–14, 14–21, 21–12)	Chen (CHN); L (8–21, 21–19, 11–21)	—N/a	2	Bye	Did not advance			14
Maiken Fruergaard; Sara Thygesen	Women's doubles	Baek H-n / Lee S-h (KOR); W (21–18, 9–21, 21–14)	Kititharakul / Prajongjai (THA); W (20–22, 23–21, 24–22)	Lambert / Tran (FRA); W (21–16, 21–12)	1 Q	—N/a	Matsuyama / Shida (JPN); L (7–21, 12–21)	Did not advance		5

Mixed

Athlete	Event	Group stage				Quarter-final	Semi-final	Final / BM	
Athlete	Event	Opposition Score	Opposition Score	Opposition Score	Rank	Opposition Score	Opposition Score	Opposition Score	Rank
Mathias Christiansen; Alexandra Bøje	Mixed doubles	Watanabe / Higashino (JPN); L WO	Tang / Tse (HKG); L WO	Ye / Lee (TPE); L WO	4	Withdrew			

== Boxing ==
For the first time since 2012, Denmark entered one boxer into the Olympic tournament. Nikolai Terteryan scored an outright quarterfinal victory to secure a spot in the men's welterweight division at the 2023 European Games in Nowy Targ, Poland.

Athlete	Event	Round of 32	Round of 16	Quarterfinals	Semifinals	Final	
Athlete	Event	Opposition Result	Opposition Result	Opposition Result	Opposition Result	Opposition Result	Rank
Nikolai Terteryan	Men's 71 kg	Bye	Traoré (FRA); W 4–1	Muydinkhujaev (UZB); L 0–5	Did not advance		5

== Canoeing ==
=== Sprint ===
Danish canoeists qualified one boat in each of the following distances for the Games through the 2023 ICF Canoe Sprint World Championships in Duisburg, Germany; and 2024 European Qualifier in Szeged, Hungary.

Athlete	Event	Heats		Quarterfinals		Semifinals		Final	
Athlete	Event	Time	Rank	Time	Rank	Time	Rank	Time	Rank
René Holten Poulsen	Men's K-1 1000 m	3:40.14	5 QF	3:35.48	1 SF	3:35.50	8 FB	3:31.62	16
Lasse Bro Madsen; Victor Gairy Aasmul; Morten Gravesen; Magnus Sibbersen	Men's K-4 500 m	1:22.98	6 QF	1:20.56	3 SF	1:21.88	5 E	DNA	10
Emma Aastrand Jørgensen	Women's K-1 500 m	1:50.93	2 SF	Bye		1:49.59	2 FA	1:49.76	3rd place, bronze medalist(s)
Emma Aastrand Jørgensen; Frederikke Hauge Matthiesen	Women's K-2 500 m	1:45.02	3 QF	1:42.61	5 E	Did not advance			17

Qualification Legend: FA = Qualify to final (medal); FB = Qualify to final B (non-medal)

== Cycling ==
=== Road ===
Denmark entered a team of six road cyclists (four male and two female). Denmark qualified four male and two female athletes through the UCI Nation Ranking and 2023 World Championships in Glasgow, Great Britain.

Men

Athlete	Event	Time	Rank
Mikkel Bjerg	Road race	6:41:17	73
Michael Mørkøv	Road race	6:36:31	59
Mads Pedersen	Road race	6:21:54	20
Mattias Skjelmose	Road race	6:21:47	17
Mikkel Bjerg	Time trial	37:55.32	10
Mattias Skjelmose	Time trial	37:57.69	14

Women

Athlete	Event	Time	Rank
Rebecca Koerner	Road race	4:12:22	76
Cecilie Uttrup Ludwig	Road race	4:04:23	29
Emma Norsgaard	Road race	4:07:16	49
Emma Norsgaard	Time trial	42:33.59	14
Cecilie Uttrup Ludwig	Time trial	44:10.93	24

=== Track ===
Denmark riders obtained a full squads of men's team pursuit events, following the release of the final UCI Olympic rankings.

Pursuit

Athlete	Event	Qualification		Semifinals		Final	
Athlete	Event	Time	Rank	Opponent Results	Rank	Opponent Results	Rank
Carl-Frederik Bévort; Tobias Aagaard Hansen; Niklas Larsen; Rasmus Lund Pedersen	Men's team pursuit	3:43:690	3 Q	Great Britain; 3:42.803	2 QB	Italy; 3:46.138	4

Omnium

Athlete	Event	Scratch race		Tempo race		Elimination race		Points race		Total points	Rank
Athlete	Event	Rank	Points	Rank	Points	Rank	Points	Rank	Points	Total points	Rank
Niklas Larsen	Men's omnium	2	38	6	30	16	10	13	6	84	10
Amalie Dideriksen	Women's omnium	6	30	7	28	8	26	22	21	105	7

Madison

Athlete	Event	Points	Laps	Rank
Niklas Larsen; Michael Mørkøv	Men's madison	21	20	3rd place, bronze medalist(s)
Amalie Dideriksen; Julie Norman Leth	Women's madison	16	—	6

=== Mountain biking ===
Danish mountain bikers secured one men and two women's quota places in the Olympic through the release of the final Olympic mountain biking rankings.

Athlete	Event	Time	Rank
Simon Andreassen	Men's cross-country	1:29:05	12
Caroline Bohé	Women's cross-country	1:33:11	15
Sofie Heby Pedersen	Women's cross-country	N/A	24

=== BMX ===
==== Race ====
Denmark secured one quota places (one women's) race for Paris 2024 through the allocations of final Olympic BMX ranking.

Athlete	Event	Quarterfinal		Last Chance		Semi Final		Final	
Athlete	Event	Points	Rank	Time	Rank	Result	Rank	Result	Rank
Malene Kejlstrup	Women's	16	16 q	37.375	4 Q	21	8	DNA	15

== Equestrian ==
Denmark fielded a squad of three dressage riders, two eventing riders and one jumping rider, into the team dressage competition by winning the gold medal in the team event at the 2022 FEI World Championships in Herning; and into the individual rider and jumping competition, through the establishment of final olympics ranking for Group A (North Western Europe).

=== Dressage ===
Athlete	Horse	Event	Grand Prix		Grand Prix Special		Grand Prix Freestyle		Overall	
Athlete	Horse	Event	Score	Rank	Score	Rank	Technical	Artistic	Score	Rank
Nanna Skodborg Merrald	Zepter	Individual	78.028	5 Q	—N/a		76.786	89.800	83.293	9
Cathrine Laudrup-Dufour	Freestyle	Individual	80.792	2 Q	—N/a		79.071	97.114	88.093	5
Daniel Bachmann Andersen	Vayron	Individual	76.910	8 Q	—N/a		77.214	92.486	84.850	7
Nanna Skodborg Merrald; Cathrine Laudrup-Dufour; Daniel Bachmann Andersen	Zepter, Freestyle, Vayron	Team	235.730	2 Q	235.669	2	—N/a		235.669	2nd place, silver medalist(s)

Qualification Legend: Q = Qualified for the final based on position in group; q = Qualified for the final based on overall position

=== Eventing ===
Athlete	Horse	Event	Dressage		Cross-country			Jumping						Total	
Athlete	Horse	Event	Dressage		Cross-country			Qualifier			Final			Total	
Athlete	Horse	Event	Penalties	Rank	Penalties	Total	Rank	Penalties	Total	Rank	Penalties	Total	Rank	Penalties	Rank
Peter Flarup	Fascination	Individual	32.40	=30	33.6	66.0	48	9.6	75.6	42	Did not advance				

=== Jumping ===
Athlete	Horse	Event	Qualification			Final		
Athlete	Horse	Event	Penalties	Total	Rank	Penalties	Time	Rank
Andreas Schou	Napoli Vh Nederassenthof	Individual	4	77.11	41	Did not advance		

== Golf ==
Denmark entered four golfers into the Olympic tournament. All of them qualified directly for the games in the men's and women's individual competitions, based on their respective world ranking position, through the release of the final top 60 ranked players, on the IGF World Rankings.

Athlete	Event	Round 1	Round 2	Round 3	Round 4	Total		
Athlete	Event	Score	Score	Score	Score	Score	Par	Rank
Nicolai Højgaard	Men's	70	70	62	68	270	−14	7
Thorbjørn Olesen	Men's	71	68	66	68	273	−11	T14
Nanna Koerstz Madsen	Women's	74	75	72	72	293	+5	T36
Emily Kristine Pedersen	Women's	73	79	75	72	299	+11	T44

== Handball ==
Summary

Key:

- ET: After extra time
- P – Match decided by penalty-shootout.

Team	Event	Group Stage						Quarterfinal	Semifinal	Final / BM	
Team	Event	Opposition Score	Opposition Score	Opposition Score	Opposition Score	Opposition Score	Rank	Opposition Score	Opposition Score	Opposition Score	Rank
Denmark men's	Men's tournament	France; W 37–29	Egypt; W 30–27	Argentina; W 38–27	Hungary; W 28–25	Norway; W 32–25	1 Q	Sweden; W 32–31	Slovenia; W 31–30	Germany; W 39–26	1st place, gold medalist(s)
Denmark women's	Women's tournament	Slovenia; W 27–19	Norway; L 18–27	Sweden; W 25–23	Germany; W 28–27	South Korea; W 28–20	3 Q	Netherlands; W 29–25	Norway; L 21–25	Sweden; W 30–25	3rd place, bronze medalist(s)

=== Men's tournament ===
Denmark men's national handball team qualified for the Olympics by advancing to the final match against the host nation France and securing an outright berth at the 2023 IHF World Championships in Stockholm, Sweden.

Team roster

A 20-player roster was announced on 10 June 2024. The final squad was announced on 3 July. On 9 July, Mads Hoxer Hangaard was replaced by Hans Lindberg. On 30 July, Simon Hald and Magnus Saugstrup were replaced by Lukas Jørgensen and Lasse Andersson.

Head coach: Nikolaj Jacobsen

No.	Pos.	Name	Date of birth (age)	Height	App.	Goals	Club
1	GK	Niklas Landin Jacobsen	19 December 1988 (aged 35)	2.01 m	275	12	(Denmark) Aalborg Håndbold
3	RB	Niclas Kirkeløkke	26 March 1994 (aged 30)	1.95 m	81	158	(Germany) SG Flensburg-Handewitt
4	LW	Magnus Landin Jacobsen	20 August 1995 (aged 28)	1.97 m	135	247	(Germany) THW Kiel
7	LW	Emil Jakobsen	24 January 1998 (aged 26)	1.90 m	72	247	(Germany) SG Flensburg-Handewitt
11	CB	Rasmus Lauge	20 June 1991 (aged 33)	1.96 m	167	247	(Denmark) Bjerringbro-Silkeborg
12	GK	Emil Nielsen	10 March 1997 (aged 27)	1.95 m	42	5	(Spain) Barça
15	P	Magnus Saugstrup	12 July 1996 (aged 28)	1.95 m	84	184	(Germany) SC Magdeburg
18	RW	Hans Lindberg	1 August 1981 (aged 42)	1.88 m	300	806	(Denmark) HØJ Elite
19	RB	Mathias Gidsel	8 February 1999 (aged 25)	1.90 m	70	376	(Germany) Füchse Berlin
21	LB	Henrik Møllgaard	2 January 1985 (aged 39)	1.97 m	218	182	(Denmark) Aalborg Håndbold
24	LB	Mikkel Hansen	22 October 1987 (aged 36)	1.92 m	268	1358	Not attached
25	P	Lukas Jørgensen	31 March 1999 (aged 25)	1.93 m	35	95	(Germany) SG Flensburg-Handewitt
28	LB	Lasse Andersson	11 March 1994 (aged 30)	1.96 m	69	77	(Germany) Füchse Berlin
34	P	Simon Hald	28 September 1994 (aged 29)	2.03 m	95	99	(Denmark) Aalborg Håndbold
42	OB	Thomas Sommer Arnoldsen	11 January 2002 (aged 22)	1.98 m	7	21	(Denmark) Aalborg Håndbold
43	LB	Simon Pytlick	11 December 2000 (aged 23)	1.93 m	37	148	(Germany) SG Flensburg-Handewitt

Group play

Pos	Team	Pld	W	D	L	GF	GA	GD	Pts	Qualification
1	Denmark	5	5	0	0	165	133	+32	10	Quarterfinals
2	Egypt	5	3	1	1	148	140	+8	7	Quarterfinals
3	Norway	5	3	0	2	139	136	+3	6	Quarterfinals
4	France (H)	5	2	1	2	129	131	−2	5	Quarterfinals
5	Hungary	5	1	0	4	137	138	−1	2	
6	Argentina	5	0	0	5	131	171	−40	0	

Source: Olympics Paris 2024 rankings
Rules for classification: 1) Points; 2) Head-to-head points; 3) Head-to-head goal difference; 4) Head-to-head goals scored; 5) Goal difference; 6) Goals scored; 7) Draw.
(H) Hosts

27 July 2024; 21:00	Denmark	37–29	France	Paris Expo Porte de Versailles, Paris; Attendance: 5,739; Referees: Schulze, Tönnies (GER)
27 July 2024; 21:00	Gidsel, Pytlick 11	(18–17)	Descat 7	Paris Expo Porte de Versailles, Paris; Attendance: 5,739; Referees: Schulze, Tönnies (GER)
27 July 2024; 21:00	1× (yellow card)	Report	1× (yellow card) 4× (suspension)	Paris Expo Porte de Versailles, Paris; Attendance: 5,739; Referees: Schulze, Tönnies (GER)

29 July 2024; 14:00	Egypt	27–30	Denmark	Paris Expo Porte de Versailles, Paris; Attendance: 5,764; Referees: Lah, Sok (SLO)
29 July 2024; 14:00	three players 5	(9–19)	Arnoldsen, Gidsel 8	Paris Expo Porte de Versailles, Paris; Attendance: 5,764; Referees: Lah, Sok (SLO)
29 July 2024; 14:00	1× (yellow card) 3× (suspension)	Report	1× (yellow card) 3× (suspension)	Paris Expo Porte de Versailles, Paris; Attendance: 5,764; Referees: Lah, Sok (SLO)

31 July 2024; 21:00	Denmark	38–27	Argentina	Paris Expo Porte de Versailles, Paris; Attendance: 5,780; Referees: Belkhiri, Hamidi (ALG)
31 July 2024; 21:00	Gidsel 13	(19–14)	Parker 6	Paris Expo Porte de Versailles, Paris; Attendance: 5,780; Referees: Belkhiri, Hamidi (ALG)
31 July 2024; 21:00	5× (suspension)	Report	2× (yellow card) 4× (suspension) 1× (red card)	Paris Expo Porte de Versailles, Paris; Attendance: 5,780; Referees: Belkhiri, Hamidi (ALG)

2 August 2024; 09:00	Hungary	25–28	Denmark	Paris Expo Porte de Versailles, Paris; Attendance: 5,764; Referees: García, Marín (ESP)
2 August 2024; 09:00	Ilić 5	(14–16)	Gidsel 8	Paris Expo Porte de Versailles, Paris; Attendance: 5,764; Referees: García, Marín (ESP)
2 August 2024; 09:00	6× (suspension)	Report	1× (suspension)	Paris Expo Porte de Versailles, Paris; Attendance: 5,764; Referees: García, Marín (ESP)

4 August 2024; 19:00	Denmark	32–25	Norway	Paris Expo Porte de Versailles, Paris; Attendance: 5,723; Referees: Nachevski, Nikolov (MKD)
4 August 2024; 19:00	Pytlick 9	(17–12)	Reinkind 6	Paris Expo Porte de Versailles, Paris; Attendance: 5,723; Referees: Nachevski, Nikolov (MKD)
4 August 2024; 19:00	2× (yellow card) 3× (suspension)	Report	4× (suspension)	Paris Expo Porte de Versailles, Paris; Attendance: 5,723; Referees: Nachevski, Nikolov (MKD)

Quarterfinal

7 August 2024; 17:30	Denmark	32–31	Sweden	Stade Pierre-Mauroy, Lille; Attendance: 26,449; Referees: C. Bonaventura, J. Bonaventura (FRA)
7 August 2024; 17:30	Pytlick 9	(16–16)	Claar 7	Stade Pierre-Mauroy, Lille; Attendance: 26,449; Referees: C. Bonaventura, J. Bonaventura (FRA)
7 August 2024; 17:30	2× (yellow card) 3× (suspension)	Report	1× (yellow card) 4× (suspension)	Stade Pierre-Mauroy, Lille; Attendance: 26,449; Referees: C. Bonaventura, J. Bonaventura (FRA)

Semifinal

9 August 2024; 21:30	Slovenia	30–31	Denmark	Stade Pierre-Mauroy, Lille; Attendance: 22,329; Referees: Horáček, Novotný (CZE)
9 August 2024; 21:30	Bombač, Vlah 7	(10–15)	M. Landin 6	Stade Pierre-Mauroy, Lille; Attendance: 22,329; Referees: Horáček, Novotný (CZE)
9 August 2024; 21:30	3× (suspension)	Report	1× (suspension)	Stade Pierre-Mauroy, Lille; Attendance: 22,329; Referees: Horáček, Novotný (CZE)

Gold medal game

11 August 2024; 13:30	Germany	26–39	Denmark	Stade Pierre-Mauroy, Lille; Attendance: 27,328; Referees: Lah, Sok (SLO)
11 August 2024; 13:30	Knorr 6	(12–21)	Gidsel 11	Stade Pierre-Mauroy, Lille; Attendance: 27,328; Referees: Lah, Sok (SLO)
11 August 2024; 13:30	1× (suspension)	Report	1× (suspension)	Stade Pierre-Mauroy, Lille; Attendance: 27,328; Referees: Lah, Sok (SLO)

=== Women's tournament ===
Denmark women's national handball team qualified for the Olympics by finishing second at the 2022 European Women's Handball Championship.

Team roster

The squad was announced on 6 June 2024. On 24 July, Helena Elver replaced Simone Petersen due to an injury. On 2 August, Michala Møller replaced Louise Burgaard.

Head coach: Jesper Jensen

No.	Pos.	Name	Date of birth (age)	Height	App.	Goals	Club
1	GK	Sandra Toft	18 October 1989 (aged 34)	1.76 m	182	2	(Hungary) Győri ETO KC
5	P	Sarah Iversen	10 April 1990 (aged 34)	1.77 m	90	148	(Denmark) Ikast Håndbold
6	CB	Helena Elver	1 March 1998 (aged 26)	1.75 m	22	28	(Denmark) Odense Håndbold
8	LB	Anne Mette Hansen	25 August 1994 (aged 29)	1.82 m	163	475	(France) Metz Handball
10	P	Kathrine Heindahl	26 March 1992 (aged 32)	1.82 m	137	277	(Denmark) Team Esbjerg
11	LB	Line Haugsted	11 November 1994 (aged 29)	1.80 m	100	132	(Denmark) Team Esbjerg
16	GK	Althea Reinhardt	1 September 1996 (aged 27)	1.80 m	112	0	(Denmark) Odense Håndbold
18	RB	Mette Tranborg	1 January 1996 (aged 28)	1.92 m	110	261	(Denmark) Team Esbjerg
23	LB	Kristina Jørgensen	17 January 1998 (aged 26)	1.87 m	112	331	(Hungary) Győri ETO KC
25	RW	Trine Østergaard	17 October 1991 (aged 32)	1.66 m	184	368	(Romania) CSM București
27	RB	Louise Burgaard	17 October 1992 (aged 31)	1.76 m	176	368	(Denmark) Odense Håndbold
32	LB	Mie Højlund	24 October 1997 (aged 26)	1.80 m	100	193	(Denmark) Odense Håndbold
33	LW	Emma Friis	31 October 1999 (aged 24)	1.62 m	59	176	(Romania) CSM București
34	P	Rikke Iversen	18 May 1993 (aged 31)	1.78 m	79	120	(Denmark) Team Esbjerg
42	LB	Michala Møller	16 February 2000 (aged 24)	1.78 m	27	27	(Denmark) Team Esbjerg

Group play

Pos	Team	Pld	W	D	L	GF	GA	GD	Pts	Qualification
1	Norway	5	4	0	1	140	110	+30	8 (Note: Norway 2 Pts, +5 GD; Sweden 2 Pts, +2 GD; Denmark 2 Pts, −7 GD.)	Quarterfinals
2	Sweden	5	4	0	1	140	125	+15	8	Quarterfinals
3	Denmark	5	4	0	1	126	116	+10	8	Quarterfinals
4	Germany	5	1	0	4	136	134	+2	2 (Note: Germany 2 Pts, +18 GD; South Korea 2 Pts, −6 GD; Slovenia 2 Pts, −12 GD.)	Quarterfinals
5	South Korea	5	1	0	4	107	133	−26	2	
6	Slovenia	5	1	0	4	116	147	−31	2	

Source: Olympics Paris 2024 rankings
Rules for classification: 1) Points; 2) Head-to-head points; 3) Head-to-head goal difference; 4) Head-to-head goals scored; 5) Goal difference; 6) Goals scored; 7) Draw.
Notes:

25 July 2024; 09:00	Slovenia	19–27	Denmark	Paris Expo Porte de Versailles, Paris; Attendance: 5,686; Referees: Brunner, Salah (SUI)
25 July 2024; 09:00	Gros, Stanko 5	(11–14)	Friis, Østergaard 5	Paris Expo Porte de Versailles, Paris; Attendance: 5,686; Referees: Brunner, Salah (SUI)
25 July 2024; 09:00	1× (yellow card) 6× (suspension)	Report	1× (yellow card) 5× (suspension)	Paris Expo Porte de Versailles, Paris; Attendance: 5,686; Referees: Brunner, Salah (SUI)

28 July 2024; 16:00	Denmark	18–27	Norway	Paris Expo Porte de Versailles, Paris; Attendance: 5,815; Referees: C. Bonaventura, J. Bonaventura (FRA)
28 July 2024; 16:00	Østergaard 5	(8–14)	Brattset Dale, Kristiansen 6	Paris Expo Porte de Versailles, Paris; Attendance: 5,815; Referees: C. Bonaventura, J. Bonaventura (FRA)
28 July 2024; 16:00	3× (suspension)	Report	1× (suspension)	Paris Expo Porte de Versailles, Paris; Attendance: 5,815; Referees: C. Bonaventura, J. Bonaventura (FRA)

30 July 2024; 21:00	Sweden	23–25	Denmark	Paris Expo Porte de Versailles, Paris; Attendance: 5,724; Referees: A. Konjičanin, D. Konjičanin (BIH)
30 July 2024; 21:00	Hagman 6	(14–14)	four players 4	Paris Expo Porte de Versailles, Paris; Attendance: 5,724; Referees: A. Konjičanin, D. Konjičanin (BIH)
30 July 2024; 21:00	4× (suspension)	Report	1× (yellow card) 3× (suspension)	Paris Expo Porte de Versailles, Paris; Attendance: 5,724; Referees: A. Konjičanin, D. Konjičanin (BIH)

1 August 2024; 19:00	Germany	27–28	Denmark	Paris Expo Porte de Versailles, Paris; Attendance: 5,722; Referees: Bíró, Kiss (HUN)
1 August 2024; 19:00	Behrend 6	(12–15)	Højlund 7	Paris Expo Porte de Versailles, Paris; Attendance: 5,722; Referees: Bíró, Kiss (HUN)
1 August 2024; 19:00	3× (suspension)	Report	4× (suspension)	Paris Expo Porte de Versailles, Paris; Attendance: 5,722; Referees: Bíró, Kiss (HUN)

3 August 2024; 21:00	Denmark	28–20	South Korea	Paris Expo Porte de Versailles, Paris; Attendance: 5,714; Referees: García, Marín (ESP)
3 August 2024; 21:00	Hansen, Jørgensen 6	(12–8)	Woo 5	Paris Expo Porte de Versailles, Paris; Attendance: 5,714; Referees: García, Marín (ESP)
3 August 2024; 21:00	1× (yellow card) 4× (suspension)	Report		Paris Expo Porte de Versailles, Paris; Attendance: 5,714; Referees: García, Marín (ESP)

Quarterfinal

6 August 2024; 09:30	Denmark	29–25	Netherlands	Stade Pierre-Mauroy, Lille; Attendance: 20,372; Referees: Kurtagic, Wetterwik (SWE)
6 August 2024; 09:30	Friis, Hansen 6	(11–10)	Housheer, Van Wetering 7	Stade Pierre-Mauroy, Lille; Attendance: 20,372; Referees: Kurtagic, Wetterwik (SWE)
6 August 2024; 09:30	5× (suspension) 1× (red card)	Report	5× (suspension)	Stade Pierre-Mauroy, Lille; Attendance: 20,372; Referees: Kurtagic, Wetterwik (SWE)

Semifinal

8 August 2024; 21:30	Norway	25–21	Denmark	Stade Pierre-Mauroy, Lille; Attendance: 15,975; Referees: Lah, Sok (SLO)
8 August 2024; 21:30	Brattset Dale 4	(11–8)	Jørgensen 4	Stade Pierre-Mauroy, Lille; Attendance: 15,975; Referees: Lah, Sok (SLO)
8 August 2024; 21:30	1× (yellow card) 3× (suspension)	Report	1× (yellow card) 3× (suspension)	Stade Pierre-Mauroy, Lille; Attendance: 15,975; Referees: Lah, Sok (SLO)

Bronze medal game

10 August 2024; 10:00	Denmark	30–25	Sweden	Stade Pierre-Mauroy, Lille; Attendance: 13,179; Referees: Jørum, Kleven (NOR)
10 August 2024; 10:00	Højlund 5	(15–13)	Hagman 5	Stade Pierre-Mauroy, Lille; Attendance: 13,179; Referees: Jørum, Kleven (NOR)
10 August 2024; 10:00	1× (yellow card) 4× (suspension)	Report	1× (yellow card) 3× (suspension)	Stade Pierre-Mauroy, Lille; Attendance: 13,179; Referees: Jørum, Kleven (NOR)

== Judo ==
Denmark qualified one judoka for the following weight class at the Games. Laerke Olsen (women's middleweight, 70 kg) got qualified via continental quota based on Olympic point rankings.

Athlete	Event	Round of 32	Round of 16	Quarterfinals	Semifinals	Repechage	Final / BM	
Athlete	Event	Opposition Result	Opposition Result	Opposition Result	Opposition Result	Opposition Result	Opposition Result	Rank
Laerke Olsen	Women's –70 kg	Samardžić (BIH); L 00–10	Did not advance					17

== Rowing ==
Danish rowers qualified boats in each of the following classes through the 2023 World Rowing Championships in Belgrade, Serbia and 2024 Final Qualification Regatta in Lucerne, Switzerland.

Athlete	Event	Heats		Repechage		Quarterfinals		Semifinals		Final	
Athlete	Event	Time	Rank	Time	Rank	Time	Rank	Time	Rank	Time	Rank
Sverri Nielsen	Men's single sculls	6:53.50	1 QF	Bye		6:49.69	2 SA/B	6:43.95	4 FB	6:44.83	8
Lærke Rasmussen; Fie Udby	Women's coxless pair	7:30.91	4 R	7:34.57	1 SA/B	Bye		7:19.11	4 FB	7:12.01	11
Marie Johannesen; Julie Poulsen; Frida Sanggaard Nielsen; Astrid Steensberg	Women's coxless four	6:56.70	5 R	6:35.65	3 FB	Bye				6:36.43	8
Clara Hornæss; Sára Johansen; Nikoline Laidlaw; Karen Mortensen; Caroline Munch; Nanna Vigild; Sofie Vikkelsøe; Frida Werner Foldager; Sofie Østergaard (Cox)	Women's eight	6:39.30	4 R	6:22.21	5 NQ	Did not advance					7

Qualification Legend: FA=Final A (medal); FB=Final B (non-medal); FC=Final C (non-medal); FD=Final D (non-medal); FE=Final E (non-medal); FF=Final F (non-medal); SA/B=Semifinals A/B; SC/D=Semifinals C/D; SE/F=Semifinals E/F; QF=Quarterfinals; R=Repechage

== Sailing ==
Danish sailors qualified one boat in each of the following classes through the 2023 Sailing World Championships, the class-associated Worlds, and the continental regattas.

Elimination events

Athlete	Event	Opening rounds															Quarterfinal	Semifinal	Final	Final rank
Athlete	Event	1	2	3	4	5	6	7	8	9	10	11	12	13	Net points	Rank	Quarterfinal	Semifinal	Final	Final rank
Johan Søe	Men's IQFoil	3	25; DNS	4	25; BFD	7	8	12	7	25; BFD	3	12	21	10	112	14	Did not advance			14

Medal race events

Athlete	Event	Race													Net points	Final rank
Athlete	Event	1	2	3	4	5	6	7	8	9	10	11	12	M*	Net points	Final rank
Johan Schubert	Men's ILCA 7	29	29	39	37	28	23	44† BFD	21	—N/a				DNA	206	36
Nikolaj Buhl; Daniel Nyborg	Men's 49er	11	18	18	10	21† UFD	16	6	16	18	17	18	3	DNA	172	18
Anne-Marie Rindom	Women's ILCA 6	7	26†	7	2	8	4	15	4	4	—N/a			5	61	2nd place, silver medalist(s)
Andrea Schmidt; Johanne Schmidt	Women's 49erFX	20	20	3	15	6	21† RET	1	12	14	6	12	6	DNA	115	13
Natacha Saouma-Pedersen; Mathias Bruun Borreskov	Mixed Nacra 17	9	5	12	16†	10	10	14	15	16	10	8	8	DNA	117	12

M = Medal race; EL = Eliminated – did not advance into the medal race

== Shooting ==
Danish shooters achieved quota places for the following events based on their results at the 2022 and 2023 ISSF World Championships, 2022, 2023, and 2024 European Championships, 2023 European Games, and 2024 ISSF World Olympic Qualification Tournament.

Athlete	Event	Qualification		Final	
Athlete	Event	Points	Rank	Points	Rank
Jesper Hansen	Men's skeet	119	14	Did not advance	
Rikke Ibsen	Women's 10 m air rifle	627.3	22	Did not advance	
Rikke Ibsen	Women's 50 m rifle 3 positions	586-26x	14	Did not advance	
Stephanie Grundsøe	Women's 10 m air rifle	626.2	27	Did not advance	
Stephanie Grundsøe	Women's 50 m rifle 3 positions	589-26x	8 Q	406.4	8

== Skateboarding ==
Denmark entered one male skateboarder to compete in the following event at the Games.

Athlete	Event	Qualification		Final	
Athlete	Event	Score	Rank	Score	Rank
Viktor Solmunde	Men's park	42.95	21	Did not advance	

== Swimming ==
Danish swimmers achieved the entry standards in the following events for Paris 2024 (a maximum of two swimmers under the Olympic Qualifying Time (OST) and potentially at the Olympic Consideration Time (OCT)):

Athlete	Event	Heat		Semifinal		Final	
Athlete	Event	Time	Rank	Time	Rank	Time	Rank
Julie Kepp Jensen	Women's 50 m freestyle	24.64	=11 Q	24.98	16	Did not advance	
Helena Rosendahl Bach	Women's 100 m butterfly	58.45	20	Did not advance			
Helena Rosendahl Bach	Women's 200 m butterfly	2:07.34	4 Q	2:06.65	6 Q NR	2:07.11	=4
Thea Blomsterberg	Women's 200 m breaststroke	2:27.81	19	Did not advance			
Signe Bro; Martine Damborg; Julie Kepp Jensen; Elisabeth Sabroe Ebbesen	Women's 4 × 100 m freestyle relay	3:39.52	11	—N/a		Did not advance	
Schastine Tabor; Thea Blomsterberg; Martine Damborg; Signe Bro	Women's 4 × 100 m medley relay	Disqualified		—N/a		Did not advance	

== Table tennis ==
Denmark entered a full squad of male table tennis player into the Games, by advancing to the quarter-finals round, through the 2024 World Team Table Tennis Championships in Busan, South Korea.

Men

Athlete	Event	Round 1	Round 2	Round 3	Round of 16	Quarterfinals	Semifinals	Final / BM	
Athlete	Event	Opposition Result	Opposition Result	Opposition Result	Opposition Result	Opposition Result	Opposition Result	Opposition Result	Rank
Jonathan Groth	Singles	Bye	Mladenovic (LUX); W 4–0	Jang (KOR); L 1–4	Did not advance				17
Anders Lind	Singles	Bye	Freitas (POR); W 4–0	Redzimski (POL); W 4–3	Harimoto (JPN); L 1–4	Did not advance			9
Jonathan Groth; Anders Lind; Martin Buch Andersen	Team	—N/a			Sweden; L 0–3	Did not advance			9

== Taekwondo ==
Denmark qualified one athlete to compete at the games. Edi Hrnic qualified for Paris 2024 following the triumph of his victory in the under 80 kg semifinal, at the 2024 European Qualification Tournament in Sofia, Bulgaria.

Athlete	Event	Qualification	Round of 16	Quarterfinals	Semifinals	Repechage	Bronze medal match	
Athlete	Event	Opposition Result	Opposition Result	Opposition Result	Opposition Result	Opposition Result	Opposition Result	Rank
Edi Hrnic	Men's −80 kg	Bye	Seif Eissa (EGY); W 2–0	Firas Katoussi (TUN); L 0–2	—N/a	Leon Sejranovic (AUS); W 2–0	Seo (KOR); W 2–0	3rd place, bronze medalist(s)

== Tennis ==
Denmark entered two tennis players into the Olympic tournament.Clara Tauson qualified directly for the women's singles as the top 56 eligible players in the ATP World Rankings as of 10 June 2024. Caroline Wozniacki also got qualified via an invitation quota.

Athlete	Event	Round of 64	Round of 32	Round of 16	Quarterfinals	Semifinals	Final / BM	
Athlete	Event	Opposition Result	Opposition Result	Opposition Result	Opposition Result	Opposition Result	Opposition Result	Rank
Clara Tauson	Women's singles	Andreescu (CAN); L 2–6, 3–6	Did not advance					
Caroline Wozniacki	Women's singles	Sherif (EGY); W 2–6, 7–5, 6–1	Collins (USA); L 3–6, 6–3, 3–6	Did not advance				

== Triathlon ==
Denmark entered two triathletes (one per gender) in the triathlon events for Paris, following the release of final individual olympics qualification ranking.

Individual

Athlete	Event	Time						Rank
Athlete	Event	Swim (1.5 km)	Trans 1	Bike (40 km)	Trans 2	Run (10 km)	Total	Rank
Emil Holm	Men's	22:26	0:49	53:37	0:25	32:04	1:49:21	35
Alberte Kjær Pedersen	Women's	24:40	0:55	1:00:41	0:27	35:19	1:56:41	36

== Wrestling ==
Denmark send only one wrestler, Turpal Bisultanov received a quota due to the reallocation of Individual Neutral Athletes (AIN) claimed by the IOC. Key:

- VT (ranking points: 5–0 or 0–5) – Victory by fall.
- VB (ranking points: 5–0 or 0–5) – Victory by injury (VF for forfeit, VA for withdrawal or disqualification)
- PP (ranking points: 3–1 or 1–3) – Decision by points – the loser with technical points.
- PO (ranking points: 3–0 or 0–3) – Decision by points – the loser without technical points.
- ST (ranking points: 4–0 or 0–4) – Great superiority – the loser without technical points and a margin of victory of at least 8 (Greco-Roman) or 10 (freestyle) points.
- SP (ranking points: 4–1 or 1–4) – Technical superiority – the loser with technical points and a margin of victory of at least 8 (Greco-Roman) or 10 (freestyle) points.

Greco-Roman

Athlete	Event	Round of 16	Quarterfinal	Semifinal	Repechage	Final / BM	
Athlete	Event	Opposition Result	Opposition Result	Opposition Result	Opposition Result	Opposition Result	Rank
Turpal Bisultanov	Men's −87 kg	Novikov (BUL); L 1–5 ^{PO}	—N/a		Gobadze (GEO); W 6–0 ^{PO}	Losonczi (HUN); W 2–1 ^{PO}	3rd place, bronze medalist(s)

== See also ==
- Denmark at the 2024 Winter Youth Olympics
- Denmark at the 2024 Summer Paralympics
