= Malaysia at the 2024 Summer Olympics =

- IOC code: MAS
- NOC: Olympic Council of Malaysia
- Website: www.olympic.org.my (in English)

in Paris, France 26 July 2024 – 11 August 2024
- Competitors: 26 (13 men and 13 women) in 11 sports
- Flag bearers (opening): Bertrand Rhodict Lises & Nur Shazrin Mohd Latif
- Flag bearer (closing): Ashley Lau
- Medals Ranked 80th: Gold 0 Silver 0 Bronze 2 Total 2

Summer Olympics appearances (overview)
- 1956; 1960; 1964; 1968; 1972; 1976; 1980; 1984; 1988; 1992; 1996; 2000; 2004; 2008; 2012; 2016; 2020; 2024

Other related appearances
- North Borneo (1956)

Malaysia competed at the 2024 Summer Olympics in Paris from 26 July to 11 August 2024. It signified the nation's appearance in every single edition of summer Olympics, since its official debut in 1956 under the name 'Malaya', except for the 1980 Summer Olympics in Moscow due to the United States-led boycott.

Malaysia left Paris with two bronze medals in badminton, with men's doubles pair Aaron Chia and Soh Wooi Yik retaining their bronze medals first won in 2021 and Lee Zii Jia taking another bronze medal in men's singles. The result of two bronze medals is the least successful outcome for the nation since 2008. It also marks the first time Malaysia claiming medals in only one sport, last time being 2008. Furthermore, it is also a return to the results achieved by the nation in 1992, where Malaysia secured medals without earning a silver and a gold. Therefore, the nation's wait for its first-ever Olympic gold medal carried on after leaving Paris. Malaysia ranked 80th in the overall results of the medal ranking, placing the nation at its worst ever standing at the Olympic Games.

In addition, Malaysia fell just short of a podium finish in badminton, weightlifting and cycling. In badminton, women's doubles pair Pearly Tan and Thinaah Muralitharan were defeated by Nami Matsuyama and Chiharu Shida of Japan in the bronze medal match, Aniq Kasdan narrowly lost to Hampton Morris of the United States in men's 61 kg event of weightlifting by a margin of only 1 kg while in cycling, Muhammad Shah Firdaus Sahrom was racing 3rd in the final lap in the gold medal match in men's keirin event of track cycling before involving in an incident where he was crashed by Shinji Nakano of Japan.

== Medalists ==
Medal	Name	Sport	Event	Date
Bronze	Aaron Chia; Soh Wooi Yik	Badminton	Men's doubles	4 August
Bronze	Lee Zii Jia	Badminton	Men's singles	5 August

Medals by sport
Sport	1st place, gold medalist(s)	2nd place, silver medalist(s)	3rd place, bronze medalist(s)	Total
Badminton	0	0	2	2
Total	0	0	2	2

Medals by gender
Gender	1st place, gold medalist(s)	2nd place, silver medalist(s)	3rd place, bronze medalist(s)	Total
Male	0	0	2	2
Total	0	0	2	2

Medals by date
Date	1st place, gold medalist(s)	2nd place, silver medalist(s)	3rd place, bronze medalist(s)	Total
4 August	0	0	1	1
5 August	0	0	1	1
Total	0	0	2	2

== Background ==
On 12 March 2023, Minister of Youth and Sports Hannah Yeoh Tseow Suan announced the appointment of President of Football Association of Malaysia (FAM) Hamidin Amin as Chef de Mission, with squash legend Nicol David as his deputy. The Ministry of Youth and Sports also launched the "Road to Gold" programme to support the national team in their quest for an elusive Olympic gold medal.

On 23 June 2024, in conjunction with Olympic Day, the Olympic Council of Malaysia (OCM) unveiled a new tiger-stripe design for the delegation's official attire, provided by Yonex-Sunrise. But after mixed public reactions and online criticism, the design was revised, and a new version featuring fiercer-looking tiger stripes was unveiled on 2 July 2024.

On 1 July 2024, the OCM picked diver Bertrand Rhodict Lises and sailor Nur Shazrin Mohamad Latif as the flag bearers for the 2024 Summer Olympics opening ceremony. In the Parade of Nations during the opening ceremony, the Malaysian delegation was represented by ten participants, consisting four officials and six athletes. All participants boarded Jean-Sébastien Mouche (JS Mouche), a boat of Bateaux Mouches with Malawi and Maldives delegates, which traveled on a route on the Seine River. The participants wore traditional costumes designed by Rizman Ruzaini named 'The Malaya', featuring an olive green colour scheme and golden songket motifs to symbolise their gold medal aspirations. The men wore the Baju Melayu Teluk Belanga, while the women wore the Baju Kurung with a kelubung.

=== Broadcasters ===
Name	Type	Ref
Astro	Pay and over-the-top	
RTM	Free-to-air and over-the-top	
Unifi TV	Pay and over-the top	

== Competitors ==
The following is the list of number of competitors in the Games.

Sport	Men	Women	Total
Archery	0	3	3
Athletics	1	0	1
Badminton	4	4	8
Cycling	2	2	4
Diving	1	1	2
Golf	1	1	2
Sailing	1	1	2
Shooting	1	0	1
Swimming	1	1	2
Weightlifting	1	0	1
Total	13	13	26

== Archery ==
Malaysia archers secured a quota place in the women's recurve individual event at the 2023 Asian Continental Qualifier Tournament in Bangkok, Thailand. Malaysia also qualified for the women's team for the first time at the 2024 Final Olympic Qualifiers Tournament in Antalya, Turkey, thus also entering 2 more archers in the women's individual recurve.

However, this is also the first time that Malaysia did not have male representatives in archery since the 2008 Games in Beijing, China, as all of its male archers were eliminated in the early rounds of the latter qualifier tournament.

Athlete	Event	Ranking round		Round of 64	Round of 32	Round of 16	Quarterfinals	Semifinals	Final / BM	
Athlete	Event	Score	Seed	Opposition Score	Opposition Score	Opposition Score	Opposition Score	Opposition Score	Opposition Score	Rank
Ariana Zairi	Women's individual	633	50	Rebagliati (ITA); L 5–6	Did not advance					
Nurul Fazil	Women's individual	622	60	Gökkır (TUR); L 0–6	Did not advance					
Syaqiera Mashayikh	Women's individual	663	14	Mîrca (MDA); W 6–0	Caetano (BRA); L 5–6	Did not advance				
Ariana Zairi; Nurul Fazil; Syaqiera Mashayikh	Women's team	1918	10	—N/a		Indonesia; L 3–5	Did not advance			

== Athletics ==
Malaysian sprinter Muhd Azeem Fahmi qualified for the Olympic competition through a universality place to compete in the Men's 100 meters event.

Key

- Note–Ranks given for track events are within the athlete's heat only
- Q = Qualified for the next round
- q = Qualified for the next round as a fastest loser or, in field events, by position without achieving the qualifying target
- NR = National record
- N/A = Round not applicable for the event
- Bye = Athlete not required to compete in round

Athlete	Event	Preliminaries		Heat		Repechage		Semifinal		Final	
Athlete	Event	Time	Rank	Time	Rank	Time	Rank	Time	Rank	Time	Rank
Muhd Azeem Fahmi	Men's 100 metres	10.42	2 Q	10.45	9	Did not advance					

== Badminton ==
Malaysia entered eight badminton players into the Olympic tournament based on the BWF Race to Paris Rankings.

Athlete	Event	Group stage				Elimination	Quarter-final	Semi-final	Final / BM	
Athlete	Event	Opposition Score	Opposition Score	Opposition Score	Rank	Opposition Score	Opposition Score	Opposition Score	Opposition Score	Rank
Lee Zii Jia	Men's singles	Nettasinghe (SRI); W (21–14, 21–12)	Abián (ESP); W (21–10, 21–13)	—N/a	1 Q	TJ Popov (FRA); W (21–13, 24–22)	Antonsen (DEN); W (21–17, 21–15)	Vitidsarn (THA); L (14–21, 15–21)	Sen (IND); W (13–21, 21–16, 21–11)	3rd place, bronze medalist(s)
Aaron Chia; Soh Wooi Yik	Men's doubles	Lane / Vendy (GBR); W (19–21, 21–16, 21–11)	Dong / Yakura (CAN); W (21–10, 21–15)	Liang WK / Wang C (CHN); L (22–24, 14–21)	2 Q	—N/a	Rankireddy / Shetty (IND); W (13–21, 21–14, 21–16)	Liang WK / Wang C (CHN); L (19–21, 21–15, 17–21)	Astrup / Rasmussen (DEN); W (16–21, 22–20, 21–19)	3rd place, bronze medalist(s)
Goh Jin Wei	Women's singles	Scholtz (RSA); W (23–21, 21–11)	Kim G-e (KOR); L (17–21, 22–20, 21–23)	—N/a	2	Did not advance				
Pearly Tan; Thinaah Muralitharan	Women's doubles	Chen QC / Jia YF (CHN); L (17–21, 20–22)	Matsumoto / Nagahara (JPN); W (18–21, 21–15, 21–16)	Rahayu / Ramadhanti (INA); W (21–18, 21–9)	2 Q	—N/a	Kim S-y / Kong H-y (KOR); W (21–12, 21–13)	Chen QC / Jia YF (CHN); L (12–21, 21–18, 15–21)	Matsuyama / Shida (JPN); L (11–21, 11–21)	4
Chen Tang Jie; Toh Ee Wei	Mixed doubles	Hee / Tan (SGP); W (23–21, 21–12)	Chiu / Gai (USA); W (21–15, 24–22)	Feng YZ / Huang DP (CHN); W (17–21, 21–15, 21–16)	1 Q	—N/a	Kim W-h / Jeong N-e (KOR); L (19–21, 14–21)	Did not advance		

== Cycling ==
=== Road ===
Malaysia cyclist secured a quota place in the women's road race events through the 2023 Asian Championships in Rayong, Thailand.

Athlete	Event	Time	Rank
Nur Aisyah Mohamad Zubir	Women's road race	DNF	

=== Track ===
Malaysia entered three riders, to compete in the men's sprint, men's keirin, women's sprint and women's keirin events, following the release of the final UCI Olympic rankings.

Sprint

Athlete	Event	Qualification		Round 1	Repechage 1	Round 2	Repechage 2	Round 3	Repechage 3	Quarterfinals	Semifinals	Finals / BM	
Athlete	Event	Time Speed (km/h)	Rank	Opposition Time Speed (km/h)	Opposition Time Speed (km/h)	Opposition Time Speed (km/h)	Opposition Time Speed (km/h)	Opposition Time Speed (km/h)	Opposition Time Speed (km/h)	Opposition Time Speed (km/h)	Opposition Time Speed (km/h)	Opposition Time Speed (km/h)	Rank
Azizulhasni Awang	Men's sprint	9.402 NR (76.579)	10 Q	Spiegel (GER); W 9.885 (72.838)	Bye	Turnbull (GBR); W 9.866 (72.978)	Bye	Hoogland (NED); L +0.037 (73.680)	Rudyk (POL); Iakovlev (ISR); L +0.190 (72.246)	Did not advance			
Muhammad Shah Firdaus Sahrom	Men's sprint	9.635 (74.728)	22 Q	Iakovlev (ISR); L +0.569 (73.627)	Lendel (LTU); Dakin (NZL); L +0.043 (73.290)	Did not advance							
Nurul Izzah Izzati Mohd Asri	Women's sprint	10.709 (67.233)	21 Q	Capewell (GBR); L +0.081 (66.140)	Ohta (JPN); Genest (CAN); L +0.054 (65.538)	Did not advance							

Keirin

Athlete	Event	Round 1	Repechage	Quarterfinals	Semifinals	Final
Athlete	Event	Rank	Rank	Rank	Rank	Rank
Azizulhasni Awang	Men's keirin	DSQ	Did not advance			
Muhammad Shah Firdaus Sahrom	Men's keirin	REL R	1 Q	3 Q	3 QG	6 REL
Nurul Izzah Izzati Mohd Asri	Women's keirin	4 R	3	Did not advance		

== Diving ==
Malaysian diver, Bertrand Rhodict Lises, secured a quota place in the men's individual platform event by virtue of top twelve individual results at the 2023 World Championships in Fukuoka, Japan. On 28 June 2024, Malaysia was given an unused quota by other nations. Following this, another diver Nur Dhabitah Sabri joined Bertrand Rhodict and competed in the women's 3 m springboard.

Athlete	Event	Preliminary		Semifinal		Final	
Athlete	Event	Points	Rank	Points	Rank	Points	Rank
Bertrand Rhodict Lises	Men's 10 m platform	313.70	25	Did not advance			
Nur Dhabitah Sabri	Women's 3 m springboard	283.65	12 Q	286.95	8 Q	244.80	12

== Golf ==
Malaysia entered two golfers into the Olympic tournament. Tokyo 2020 Olympian, Gavin Green, and Ashley Lau; both qualified directly for the games in the individual competitions, based on their own world ranking positions, on the IGF World Rankings.

Athlete	Event	Round 1	Round 2	Round 3	Round 4	Total		
Athlete	Event	Score	Score	Score	Score	Score	Par	Rank
Gavin Green	Men's	74	69	69	69	281	−3	T33
Ashley Lau	Women's	72	77	79	78	306	+18	T55

== Sailing ==
Malaysian sailors secured a quota place in the women's ILCA6 event through winning the event at the 2022 Asian Games in Hangzhou, China; and in the men's ILCA7 event at the 2024 Semaine Olympique Française (Last Chance Regatta) in Hyères, France.

Medal race events

Athlete	Event	Race											Net points	Final rank
Athlete	Event	1	2	3	4	5	6	7	8	9	10	M*	Net points	Final rank
Khairulnizam Afendy	Men's ILCA 7	32	15	22	21	30	26	22	~~34~~	Cancelled		EL	168	32
Nur Shazrin Mohd Latif	Women's ILCA 6	19	~~38~~	23	29	20	32	29	29	32	Cancelled	EL	215	35

M = Medal race; EL = Eliminated – did not advance into the medal race

== Shooting ==
Malaysian shooter achieved quota places for the following events based on their results at the 2022 and 2023 ISSF World Championships, 2023 and 2024 Asian Championships, and 2024 ISSF World Olympic Qualification Tournament.

Athlete	Event	Qualification		Final	
Athlete	Event	Points	Rank	Points	Rank
Johnathan Wong	Men's 10 m air pistol	570	26	Did not advance	

== Swimming ==
Two Malaysian swimmers qualified for the Olympic Games through universality places.

Athlete	Event	Heat		Semifinal		Final	
Athlete	Event	Time	Rank	Time	Rank	Time	Rank
Khiew Hoe Yean	Men's 400 m freestyle	3:51.66	27	—N/a		Did not advance	
Tan Rouxin	Women's 100 m breaststroke	1:12.50	33	Did not advance			

== Weightlifting ==
Malaysia entered one weightlifter into the Olympic competition. Aniq Kasdan (men's 61 kg) secured one of the top ten slots in his weight divisions based on the IWF Olympic Qualification Rankings; marking the nations return after last participation in 2016.

Athlete	Event	Snatch		Clean & Jerk		Total	Rank
Athlete	Event	Result	Rank	Result	Rank	Total	Rank
Aniq Kasdan	Men's −61 kg	130	4	167	3	297	4

== See also ==
- Malaysia at the 2024 Summer Paralympics
- Malaysia at the Olympics
