= Badminton at the 2024 Summer Olympics =

Badminton at the Games of the XXXIII Olympiad
- Venue: Porte de La Chapelle Arena
- Dates: 27 July – 5 August 2024
- No. of events: 5 (2 men, 2 women, 1 mixed)
- Competitors: 173 from 49 nations

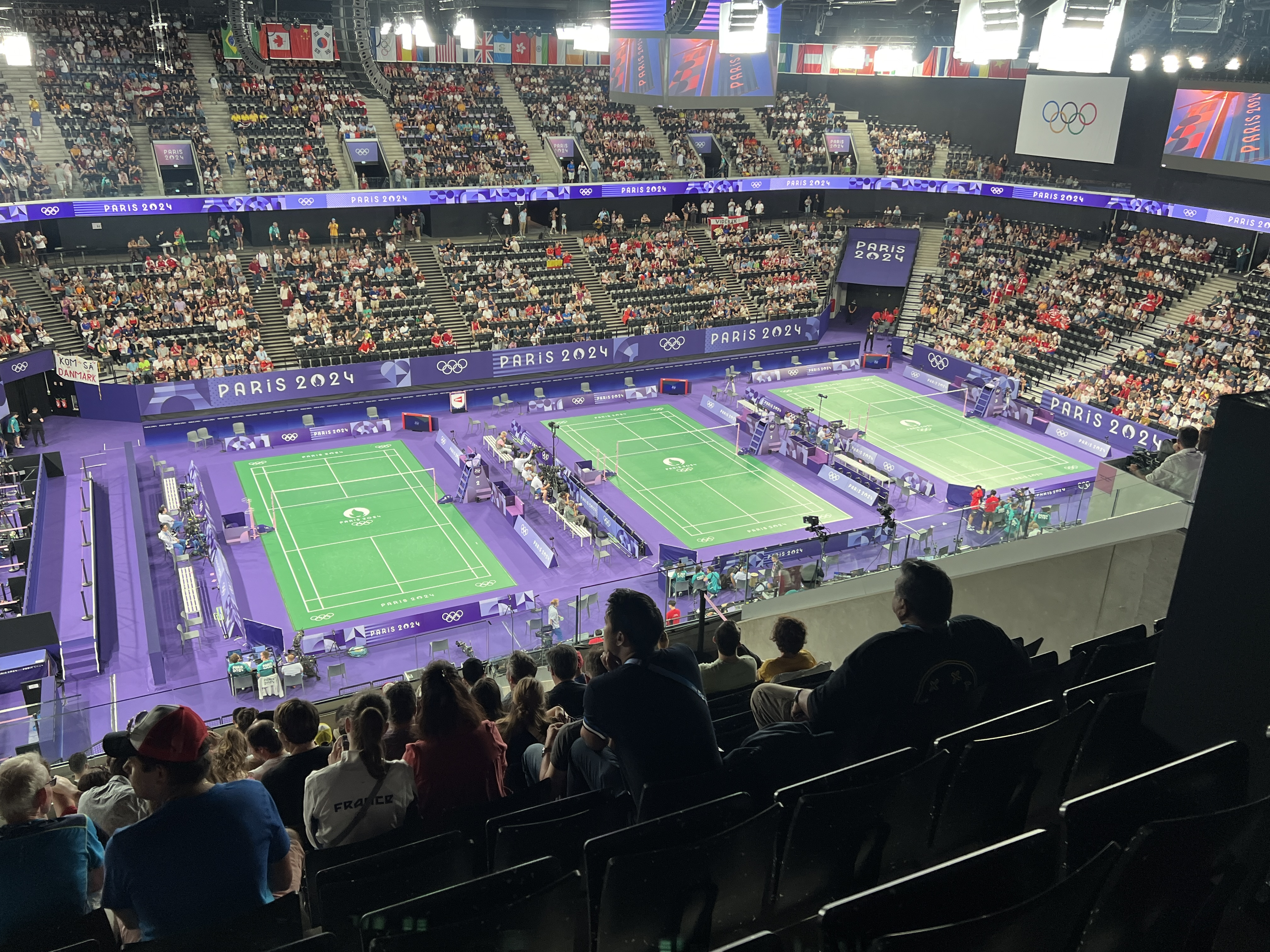
Porte de La Chapelle Arena during the Games

The badminton tournaments at the 2024 Summer Olympics in Paris ran from 27 July to 5 August at Porte de La Chapelle Arena. A total of 171 badminton players competed across five medal events (two per gender and a mixed) at these Games.

== Qualification ==
There were 172 badminton quota places, with an equal split between men and women, available for Paris 2024; NOCs could enter a maximum of eight badminton players across five medal events (men's and women's singles; men's, women's, and mixed doubles). The host nation France reserved a spot each in the men's and women's singles to be officially awarded to its respective highest-ranked badminton player, while four places (two per gender) were entitled to the eligible NOCs interested to have badminton players compete for Paris 2024 under the Universality principle.

The remaining badminton players underwent a direct qualifying process to secure a spot in their respective categories for Paris 2024 through the "Race to Paris" ranking list prepared by the Badminton World Federation. The qualification period commenced on 1 May 2023 and concluded on 28 April 2024, with the final eligibility list published two days after the deadline.

NOCs could enter a maximum of two players each in the men's and women's singles if they were ranked within the top sixteen of the "Race to Paris" ranking list, respectively; otherwise, they sent a single player until the roster of thirty-eight was completed. Similar protocols also applied to the players competing in the doubles tournament as the NOCs could enter a maximum of two pairs if they were ranked in the top eight with the rest entitled to a single pair until the quota of sixteen was reached. Additional rules ensure that each category must have featured a badminton player representing each of the five continental zones (Africa, Americas, Asia, Europe, and Oceania) and assign additional quota places if some players qualify for multiple events.

== Competition schedule ==
Legend
P	Preliminary round	R16	Round of 16	¼	Quarter-finals	½	Semi-finals	F	Final

Schedule
Date →	Sat 27			Sun 28			Mon 29			Tue 30			Wed 31			Thu 1			Fri 2		Sat 3		Sun 4		Mon 5	
Event ↓	M	A	E	M	A	E	M	A	E	M	A	E	M	A	E	M	A	E	M	A	M	A	M	A	M	A
Men's singles	P															R16				¼			½			F
Men's doubles	P																¼		½					F		
Women's singles	P																R16				¼		½		F	
Women's doubles	P															¼			½			F				
Mixed doubles	P			P											¼			½		F						

== Medal summary ==
=== Medal table ===
* Host nation (France)

Rank	NOC	Gold	Silver	Bronze	Total
1	China	2	3	0	5
2	South Korea	1	1	0	2
3	Chinese Taipei	1	0	0	1
3	Denmark	1	0	0	1
5	Thailand	0	1	0	1
6	Japan	0	0	2	2
6	Malaysia	0	0	2	2
8	Indonesia	0	0	1	1
Totals (8 entries)		5	5	5	15

=== Medalists ===
Event	Gold	Silver	Bronze
Men's singles	Viktor Axelsen; Denmark	Kunlavut Vitidsarn; Thailand	Lee Zii Jia; Malaysia
Women's singles	An Se-young; South Korea	He Bingjiao; China	Gregoria Mariska Tunjung; Indonesia
Men's doubles	Chinese Taipei; Lee Yang; Wang Chi-lin	China; Liang Weikeng; Wang Chang	Malaysia; Aaron Chia; Soh Wooi Yik
Women's doubles	China; Chen Qingchen; Jia Yifan	China; Liu Shengshu; Tan Ning	Japan; Nami Matsuyama; Chiharu Shida
Mixed doubles	China; Zheng Siwei; Huang Yaqiong	South Korea; Kim Won-ho; Jeong Na-eun	Japan; Yuta Watanabe; Arisa Higashino

== Participating NOCs ==
In total, there were 173 participants from 49 nations.

- Algeria (2)
- Australia (3)
- Austria (1)
- Azerbaijan (2)
- Belgium (2)
- Brazil (2)
- Bulgaria (3)
- Canada (4)
- China (16)
- Czech Republic (4)
- Denmark (7)
- El Salvador (1)
- Estonia (1)
- Finland (1)
- France (9) (hosts)
- Germany (4)
- Great Britain (3)
- Guatemala (1)
- Hong Kong (6)
- India (7)
- Indonesia (9)
- Ireland (2)
- Israel (1)
- Italy (1)
- Japan (12)
- Kazakhstan (1)
- Malaysia (8)
- Maldives (1)
- Mauritius (2)
- Mexico (1)
- Myanmar (1)
- Nepal (1)
- Netherlands (2)
- Nigeria (1)
- Peru (1)
- Refugee Olympic Team (1)
- Singapore (4)
- South Africa (1)
- South Korea (12)
- Spain (2)
- Sri Lanka (1)
- Suriname (1)
- Switzerland (2)
- Chinese Taipei (6)
- Thailand (9)
- Turkey (1)
- Ukraine (1)
- United States (7)
- Vietnam (2)
