= Prince Dahal =

Nepalese badminton player

Prince Dahal प्रिंस दाहाल
Personal information
- Born: 19 June 2004 (age 22) Khalanga, Darchula, Nepal
- Years active: 2017–present
- Height: 1.72 m (5 ft 8 in)

Sport
- Country: Nepal
- Sport: Badminton
- Highest ranking: 214 (MS 17 October 2023); 281 (MD with Sunil Joshi, 17 October 2023)
- BWF profile
Medal record
Men's badminton
Representing Nepal
South Asian Games
Bronze medal – third place	2019 Kathmandu-Pokhara	Men's doubles
Bronze medal – third place	2019 Kathmandu-Pokhara	Men's teams

Prince Dahal (born 19 June 2004) is a Nepalese badminton player.

== Career ==
He won the 2018 Dubai International Junior series. He reached a career high of world number seventh of the world junior ranking in March 2020. In 2022, he was ranked number one junior player in the world. In the 2019 South Asia Under 21 Championships, he won a silver medal. Dahal qualified to compete at the 2024 Summer Olympics, and became the first ever Nepalese to do so.
