= Viren Nettasinghe =

Sri Lankan badminton player

Personal information
- Born: Pulikkutty Arachchilage Viren Nettasinghe; 17 June 2003 (age 23) Colombo, Sri Lanka
- Height: 1.85 m (6 ft 1 in)

Sport
- Country: Sri Lanka
- Sport: Badminton
- Handedness: Right

Men's singles
- Highest ranking: 60 (18 November 2025)
- Current ranking: 80 (27 October 2026)
- BWF profile

Pulikkutty Arachchilage Viren Nettasinghe (born 17 June 2003) is a Sri Lankan badminton player. He qualified to represent Sri Lanka at the 2024 Summer Olympics and was named his country's flag bearer.

== Biography ==
Nettasinghe was born on 17 June 2003. He grew up in Sri Lanka and attended St. Peter's College, Colombo. He quickly became a top badminton player and participated for Sri Lanka at the 2019 BWF World Junior Championships. In 2021, at the age of 18, he won the bronze medal at the Yonex Sunrise Bangladesh Junior International tournament. He then won bronze at the 2022 Uganda Challenge and later became the runner-up at the Sri Lankan national championships. He also reached the quarterfinals of the India International Challenge, defeating a player ranked 83rd globally and then one ranked 105th before losing to 38th-ranked Subhankar Dey.

Nettasinghe was ranked 773rd in the world by the Badminton World Federation (BWF) in 2022, but had jumped to 150th by March 2023. He won another bronze medal at the Uganda Challenge early in 2023 and received the honor of "Most Outstanding Badminton Player" at the Sri Lankan national school sports awards ceremony in March that year. In September 2023, Nettasinghe was the runner-up at the Xpora Indonesia International Challenge, losing in the final to Alwi Farhan in a performance described as "nothing short of spectacular" by Sri Lankan officials. His global ranking rose to 83rd after the tournament. Later that month, he was chosen as the sole Sri Lankan badminton representative at the Asian Games, where he reached the top 16.

By April 2024, Nettasinghe was ranked 72nd globally by the BWF. He was chosen to compete at the 2024 Summer Olympics in the men's singles, being ranked 32nd among players eligible for the event. Aged 20 at the time of his selection, he was the youngest badminton player to directly qualify for the 2024 Olympics and became the youngest Sri Lankan Olympic badminton player. He was later chosen as the country's flag bearer and the male team captain at the games.

== Achievements ==
=== BWF International Challenge/Series (1 title, 1 runner-up) ===
Men's singles
| Year | Tournament | Opponent | Score | Result |
|---|---|---|---|---|
| 2023 (I) | Indonesia International | (Indonesia) Alwi Farhan | 15–21, 10–21 | (silver) Runner-up |
| 2024 | Bangladesh International | (Canada) Xiaodong Sheng | 21–12, 21–17 | (gold) Winner |

BWF International Challenge tournament
BWF International Series tournament
BWF Future Series tournament
