= Badminton at the 2024 Summer Olympics – Men's doubles =

Men's doubles at the Games of the XXXIII Olympiad
- Venue: Porte de La Chapelle Arena
- Dates: 27 July – 4 August 2024
- Competitors: 34 from 15 nations
- Teams: 17

Medalists
1st place, gold medalist(s)		Lee Yang; Wang Chi-lin	Chinese Taipei
2nd place, silver medalist(s)		Liang Weikeng; Wang Chang	China
3rd place, bronze medalist(s)		Aaron Chia; Soh Wooi Yik	Malaysia

The men's doubles badminton tournament at the 2024 Summer Olympics took place from 27 July to 4 August 2024 at the Porte de La Chapelle Arena in Paris. A total of 34 players from 15 nations competed at the tournament.

Lee Yang and Wang Chi-lin of Chinese Taipei successfully defended their title, defeating Liang Weikeng and Wang Chang of China in the final, 21–17, 18–21, 21–19 to win the gold medal in men's doubles badminton at the 2024 Summer Olympics. They became the first men's doubles pair to do so together and the first consecutive Olympic badminton champions not to represent the People's Republic of China. In the bronze-medal match, defending medalists Aaron Chia and Soh Wooi Yik of Malaysia defeated Denmark's Kim Astrup and Anders Skaarup Rasmussen, 16–21, 22–20, 21–19. The pair saved four match points during the second game to claim Malaysia's third consecutive medal in the event.

== Format ==
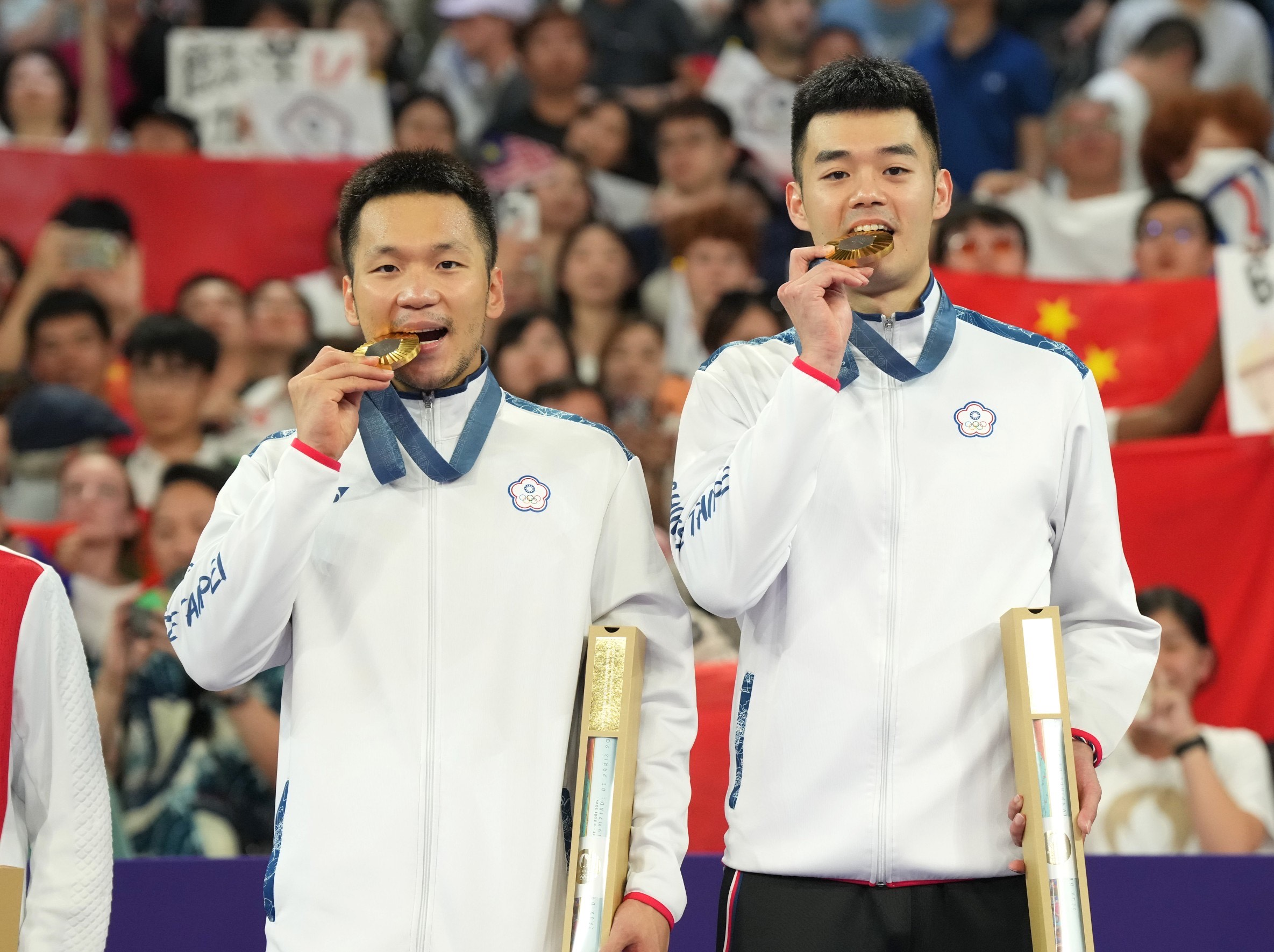
Lee Yang (left) pictured with Wang Chi-lin (right) during the medal ceremony.

The 17 teams were split into three groups of four pairs and one group of five pairs. They played a round-robin tournament with the top-two ranked teams advancing to the knockout stage. Each match was played in a best-of-3.

== Schedule ==
The schedule is as follows.

Legend

P	Preliminaries	QF	Quarter-finals	SF	Semi-finals	M	Medal matches

27 Jul	28 Jul	29 Jul	30 Jul	31 Jul	1 Aug	2 Aug	3 Aug	4 Aug
P					QF	SF		M

== Draw ==
The group stage draw was scheduled to be held on 12 July 2024 but was postponed to 15 July 2024. The knockout stage draw was held on 31 July 2024.

== Seeds ==
The top four teams of the BWF World Ranking were seeded.

1. Liang Weikeng / Wang Chang (CHN) (silver medalists)
2. Kim Astrup / Anders Skaarup Rasmussen (DEN) (fourth place)
3. Satwiksairaj Rankireddy / Chirag Shetty (IND) (quarter-finals)
4. Kang Min-hyuk / Seo Seung-jae (KOR) (quarter-finals)

== Group stage ==
All times are local (UTC+2).

=== Group A ===
Pos	Team	Pld	W	L	GF	GA	GD	PF	PA	PD	Pts	Qualification
1	Liang Weikeng / Wang Chang (CHN)	3	3	0	6	1	+5	142	106	+36	3	Quarter-finals
2	Aaron Chia / Soh Wooi Yik (MAS)	3	2	1	4	3	+1	139	118	+21	2	Quarter-finals
3	Ben Lane / Sean Vendy (GBR)	3	1	2	4	4	0	143	142	+1	1	
4	Adam Dong / Nyl Yakura (CAN)	3	0	3	0	6	−6	68	126	−58	0	

Source: Olympics

Date	Time	Player 1	Score	Player 2	Set 1	Set 2	Set 3	Report
27 July	09:20	Liang Weikeng (China); Wang Chang (China)	2–0	(Canada) Adam Dong (Canada) Nyl Yakura	21–5	21–12		Report
27 July	10:10	Aaron Chia (Malaysia); Soh Wooi Yik (Malaysia)	2–1	(United Kingdom) Ben Lane (United Kingdom) Sean Vendy	19–21	21–16	21–11	Report
28 July	09:20	Aaron Chia (Malaysia); Soh Wooi Yik (Malaysia)	2–0	(Canada) Adam Dong (Canada) Nyl Yakura	21–10	21–15		Report
28 July	10:10	Liang Weikeng (China); Wang Chang (China)	2–1	(United Kingdom) Ben Lane (United Kingdom) Sean Vendy	21–18	13–21	21–14	Report
29 July	20:20	Ben Lane (United Kingdom); Sean Vendy (United Kingdom)	2–0	(Canada) Adam Dong (Canada) Nyl Yakura	21–14	21–12		Report
29 July	21:10	Liang Weikeng (China); Wang Chang (China)	2–0	(Malaysia) Aaron Chia (Malaysia) Soh Wooi Yik	24–22	21–14		Report

=== Group B ===
Pos	Team	Pld	W	L	GF	GA	GD	PF	PA	PD	Pts	Qualification
1	Kang Min-hyuk / Seo Seung-jae (KOR)	3	3	0	6	0	+6	126	92	+34	3	Quarter-finals
2	Supak Jomkoh / Kittinupong Kedren (THA)	3	2	1	4	2	+2	115	98	+17	2	Quarter-finals
3	Christo Popov / Toma Junior Popov (FRA) (H)	3	1	2	2	4	−2	107	121	−14	1	
4	Ondřej Král / Adam Mendrek (CZE)	3	0	3	0	6	−6	89	126	−37	0	

Source: Olympics
(H) Host

Date	Time	Player 1	Score	Player 2	Set 1	Set 2	Set 3	Report
27 July	19:30	Supak Jomkoh (Thailand); Kittinupong Kedren (Thailand)	2–0	(France) Christo Popov (France) Toma Junior Popov	21–14	21–19		Report
27 July	22:00	Kang Min-hyuk (South Korea); Seo Seung-jae (South Korea)	2–0	(Czech Republic) Ondřej Král (Czech Republic) Adam Mendrek	21–12	21–17		Report
28 July	14:00	Kang Min-hyuk (South Korea); Seo Seung-jae (South Korea)	2–0	(France) Christo Popov (France) Toma Junior Popov	21–17	21–15		Report
28 July	16:30	Supak Jomkoh (Thailand); Kittinupong Kedren (Thailand)	2–0	(Czech Republic) Ondřej Král (Czech Republic) Adam Mendrek	21–10	21–13		Report
30 July	15:40	Kang Min-hyuk (South Korea); Seo Seung-jae (South Korea)	2–0	(Thailand) Supak Jomkoh (Thailand) Kittinupong Kedren	21–16	21–15		Report
30 July	21:10	Christo Popov (France); Toma Junior Popov (France)	2–0	(Czech Republic) Ondřej Král (Czech Republic) Adam Mendrek	21–18	21–19		Report

=== Group C ===
Pos	Team	Pld	W	L	GF	GA	GD	PF	PA	PD	Pts	Qualification
1	Satwiksairaj Rankireddy / Chirag Shetty (IND)	2	2	0	4	0	+4	84	57	+27	2	Quarter-finals
2	Fajar Alfian / Muhammad Rian Ardianto (INA)	2	1	1	2	2	0	68	65	+3	1	Quarter-finals
3	Lucas Corvée / Ronan Labar (FRA) (H)	2	0	2	0	4	−4	54	84	−30	0	
4	Mark Lamsfuß / Marvin Seidel (GER) (Note: Mark Lamsfuß and Marvin Seidel withdrew during the tournament.)	0	0	0	0	0	0	0	0	0	0	Withdrew

Source: Olympics
(H) Host
Notes:

Date	Time	Player 1	Score	Player 2	Set 1	Set 2	Set 3	Report
27 July	14:50	Fajar Alfian (Indonesia); Muhammad Rian Ardianto (Indonesia)	~~2–0~~	(Germany) Mark Lamsfuß (Germany) Marvin Seidel	~~21–13~~	~~21–17~~		Report
27 July	16:30	Satwiksairaj Rankireddy (India); Chirag Shetty (India)	2–0	(France) Lucas Corvée (France) Ronan Labar	21–17	21–14		Report
29 July	11:00	Fajar Alfian (Indonesia); Muhammad Rian Ardianto (Indonesia)	2–0	(France) Lucas Corvée (France) Ronan Labar	21–13	21–10		Report
30 July	14:00	Satwiksairaj Rankireddy (India); Chirag Shetty (India)	2–0	(Indonesia) Fajar Alfian (Indonesia) Muhammad Rian Ardianto	21–13	21–13		Report

=== Group D ===
Pos	Team	Pld	W	L	GF	GA	GD	PF	PA	PD	Pts	Qualification
1	Lee Yang / Wang Chi-lin (TPE)	4	4	0	8	2	+6	207	162	+45	4	Quarter-finals
2	Kim Astrup / Anders Skaarup Rasmussen (DEN)	4	3	1	7	2	+5	178	157	+21	3	Quarter-finals
3	Liu Yuchen / Ou Xuanyi (CHN)	4	2	2	5	4	+1	173	169	+4	2	
4	Takuro Hoki / Yugo Kobayashi (JPN)	4	1	3	2	6	−4	145	151	−6	1	
5	Vinson Chiu / Joshua Yuan (USA)	4	0	4	0	8	−8	104	168	−64	0	

Source: Olympics

Date	Time	Player 1	Score	Player 2	Set 1	Set 2	Set 3	Report
27 July	21:10	Takuro Hoki (Japan); Yugo Kobayashi (Japan)	0–2	(Chinese Taipei) Lee Yang (Chinese Taipei) Wang Chi-lin	16–21	10–21		Report
27 July	22:00	Kim Astrup (Denmark); Anders Skaarup Rasmussen (Denmark)	2–0	(United States) Vinson Chiu (United States) Joshua Yuan	21–13	21–16		Report
28 July	20:20	Kim Astrup (Denmark); Anders Skaarup Rasmussen (Denmark)	1–2	(Chinese Taipei) Lee Yang (Chinese Taipei) Wang Chi-lin	15–21	21–19	15–21	Report
28 July	21:10	Liu Yuchen (China); Ou Xuanyi (China)	2–0	(United States) Vinson Chiu (United States) Joshua Yuan	21–13	21–14		Report
29 July	15:40	Kim Astrup (Denmark); Anders Skaarup Rasmussen (Denmark)	2–0	(China) Liu Yuchen (China) Ou Xuanyi	21–15	21–13		Report
29 July	19:30	Takuro Hoki (Japan); Yugo Kobayashi (Japan)	2–0	(United States) Vinson Chiu (United States) Joshua Yuan	21–11	21–12		Report
30 July	11:00	Lee Yang (Chinese Taipei); Wang Chi-lin (Chinese Taipei)	2–0	(United States) Vinson Chiu (United States) Joshua Yuan	21–12	21–13		Report
30 July	15:40	Takuro Hoki (Japan); Yugo Kobayashi (Japan)	0–2	(China) Liu Yuchen (China) Ou Xuanyi	20–22	18–21		Report
31 July	14:00	Kim Astrup (Denmark); Anders Skaarup Rasmussen (Denmark)	2–0	(Japan) Takuro Hoki (Japan) Yugo Kobayashi	21–19	22–20		Report
31 July	14:00	Liu Yuchen (China); Ou Xuanyi (China)	1–2	(Chinese Taipei) Lee Yang (Chinese Taipei) Wang Chi-lin	21–17	17–21	22–24	Report

== Knockout stage ==
Quarter-finals
A1	Liang Weikeng (CHN); Wang Chang (CHN)	24	22
C2	Fajar Alfian (INA); Muhammad Rian Ardianto (INA)	22	20
C1	Satwiksairaj Rankireddy (IND); Chirag Shetty (IND)	21	14	16
A2	Aaron Chia (MAS); Soh Wooi Yik (MAS)	13	21	21
D2	Kim Astrup (DEN); Anders Skaarup Rasmussen (DEN)	21	22
B1	Kang Min-hyuk (KOR); Seo Seung-jae (KOR)	19	20
B2	Supak Jomkoh (THA); Kittinupong Kedren (THA)	14	17
D1	Lee Yang (TPE); Wang Chi-lin (TPE)	21	21

Semi-finals
A1	Liang Weikeng (CHN); Wang Chang (CHN)	21	15	21
A2	Aaron Chia (MAS); Soh Wooi Yik (MAS)	19	21	17
D2	Kim Astrup (DEN); Anders Skaarup Rasmussen (DEN)	21	17	10
D1	Lee Yang (TPE); Wang Chi-lin (TPE)	18	21	21

Gold medal match
A1	Liang Weikeng (CHN); Wang Chang (CHN)	17	21	19
D1	Lee Yang (TPE); Wang Chi-lin (TPE)	21	18	21
Bronze medal match
A2	Aaron Chia (MAS); Soh Wooi Yik (MAS)	16	22	21
D2	Kim Astrup (DEN); Anders Skaarup Rasmussen (DEN)	21	20	19
