= 2025 Badminton Asia Championships - Qualification =

Badminton Team Tournament in China

Following the results for the 2025 Badminton Asia Championships qualification.

== Qualification ==
=== Final standings ===
Group	Men's singles	Women's singles	Men's doubles	Women's doubles	Mixed doubles
A	(Malaysia) Justin Hoh	(Malaysia) Wong Ling Ching	(Macau) Pui Chi Chon (Macau) Pui Pang Fong	(Sri Lanka) Isuri Attanayake (Sri Lanka) Sithumi De Silva	(Japan) Hiroki Nishi (Japan) Akari Sato
B	(Sri Lanka) Viren Nettasinghe	(Sri Lanka) Ranithma Liyanage	(Sri Lanka) Madhuka Dulanjana (Sri Lanka) Lahiru Weerasinghe	(Hong Kong) Fu Chi Yan (Hong Kong) Leung Sze Lok	(Philippines) Julius Villabrille (Philippines) Airah Albo
C	(Macau) Pui Pang Fong	(Hong Kong) Saloni Samirbhai Mehta	(Bangladesh) Jumar Al-Amin (Bangladesh) Moajjam Hossain Ohidul	(Singapore) Heng Xiaoen (Singapore) Jin Yujia	(Sri Lanka) Thulith Palliyaguru (Sri Lanka) Panchali Adhikari
D	(Kazakhstan) Dmitriy Panarin	(Chinese Taipei) Huang Yu-hsun	(Hong Kong) Hung Kuei Chun (Hong Kong) Lui Chun Wai	(Vietnam) Phạm Thị Dieu Ly (Vietnam) Phạm Thị Khánh	(Macau) Leong Iok Chong (Macau) Ng Weng Chi

== Men's singles ==
=== Seeds ===
1. (Malaysia) Justin Hoh (qualified)
2. (Vietnam) Lê Đức Phát (group stage)

=== Group A ===
Pos	Team	Pld	W	L	GF	GA	GD	PF	PA	PD	Pts
1	(Malaysia) Justin Hoh [1]	2	2	0	4	0	+4	84	43	+41	2
2	(Philippines) Jewel Albo	2	1	1	2	2	0	65	73	−8	1
3	(Iran) Amirhossein Hasani	2	0	2	0	4	−4	51	84	−33	0

Updated to match(es) played on unknown. Source: Badminton Asia

Date		Score		Set 1	Set 2	Set 3
8 April	Justin Hoh (Malaysia)	2–0	(Iran) Amirhossein Hasani	21–6	21–14	–
8 April	Jewel Albo (Philippines)	2–0	(Iran) Amirhossein Hasani	21–14	21–17	–
8 April	Justin Hoh (Malaysia)	2–0	(Philippines) Jewel Albo	21–14	21–9	–

=== Group B ===
Pos	Team	Pld	W	L	GF	GA	GD	PF	PA	PD	Pts
1	(Sri Lanka) Viren Nettasinghe	2	2	0	4	1	+3	98	60	+38	2
2	(Vietnam) Lê Đức Phát [2]	2	1	1	3	2	+1	87	76	+11	1
3	(Brunei) Kan Kah Kit	2	0	2	0	4	−4	35	84	−49	0

Updated to match(es) played on unknown. Source: Badminton Asia

Date		Score		Set 1	Set 2	Set 3
8 April	Lê Đức Phát (Vietnam)	2–0	(Brunei) Kan Kah Kit	21–11	21–9	–
8 April	Viren Nettasinghe (Sri Lanka)	2–0	(Brunei) Kan Kah Kit	21–10	21–5	–
8 April	Lê Đức Phát (Vietnam)	1–2	(Sri Lanka) Viren Nettasinghe	21–14	11–21	13–21

=== Group C ===
Pos	Team	Pld	W	L	GF	GA	GD	PF	PA	PD	Pts
1	(Macau) Pui Pang Fong	2	2	0	4	1	+3	95	81	+14	2
2	(United Arab Emirates) Vishal Vasudevan	2	1	1	3	2	+1	88	92	−4	1
3	(Saudi Arabia) Mahd Shaikh	2	0	2	0	4	−4	75	85	−10	0

Updated to match(es) played on unknown. Source: Badminton Asia

Date		Score		Set 1	Set 2	Set 3
8 April	Vishal Vasudevan (United Arab Emirates)	2–0	(Saudi Arabia) Mahd Shaikh	22–20	21–19	–
8 April	Pui Pang Fong (Macau)	2–0	(Saudi Arabia) Mahd Shaikh	21–18	21–18	–
8 April	Vishal Vasudevan (United Arab Emirates)	1–2	(Macau) Pui Pang Fong	21–11	11–21	13–21

=== Group D ===
Pos	Team	Pld	W	L	GF	GA	GD	PF	PA	PD	Pts
1	(Kazakhstan) Dmitriy Panarin	2	2	0	4	0	+4	84	42	+42	2
2	(Myanmar) Hein Htut	2	1	1	2	3	−1	76	86	−10	1
3	(Bangladesh) Khandokar Abdus Soad	2	0	2	1	4	−3	68	100	−32	0

Updated to match(es) played on unknown. Source: Badminton Asia

Date		Score		Set 1	Set 2	Set 3
8 April	Dmitriy Panarin (Kazakhstan)	2–0	(Bangladesh) Khandokar Abdus Soad	21–18	21–6	–
8 April	Hein Htut (Myanmar)	2–1	(Bangladesh) Khandokar Abdus Soad	21–11	16–21	21–12
8 April	Dmitriy Panarin (Kazakhstan)	2–0	(Myanmar) Hein Htut	21–12	21–6	–

== Women's singles ==
=== Seeds ===
1. (Hong Kong) Lo Sin Yan (promoted to main draw)
2. (Malaysia) Letshanaa Karupathevan (promoted to main draw)

=== Group A ===
Pos	Team	Pld	W	L	GF	GA	GD	PF	PA	PD	Pts
1	(Malaysia) Wong Ling Ching	1	1	0	2	0	+2	42	27	+15	1
2	(Hong Kong) Lo Sin Yan [1] (P)	0	0	0	0	0	0	0	0	0	0
3	(Myanmar) Thet Htar Thuzar	1	0	1	0	2	−2	27	42	−15	0

Updated to match(es) played on unknown. Source: Badminton Asia
(P) Promoted

Date		Score		Set 1	Set 2	Set 3
8 April	Wong Ling Ching (Malaysia)	2–0	(Myanmar) Thet Htar Thuzar	21–16	21–11	–
8 April	Lo Sin Yan (Hong Kong)	N/P	(Myanmar) Thet Htar Thuzar	Cancelled		
8 April	Wong Ling Ching (Malaysia)	N/P	(Hong Kong) Lo Sin Yan	Cancelled		

=== Group B ===
Pos	Team	Pld	W	L	GF	GA	GD	PF	PA	PD	Pts
1	(Sri Lanka) Ranithma Liyanage	1	1	0	2	1	+1	60	39	+21	1
2	(Malaysia) Letshanaa Karupathevan [2] (P)	0	0	0	0	0	0	0	0	0	0
3	(Philippines) Mikaela de Guzman	1	0	1	1	2	−1	39	60	−21	0

Updated to match(es) played on unknown. Source: Badminton Asia
(P) Promoted

Date		Score		Set 1	Set 2	Set 3
8 April	Mikaela de Guzman (Philippines)	1–2	(Sri Lanka) Ranithma Liyanage	21–11	18–21	21–7
8 April	Letshanaa Karupathevan (Malaysia)	N/P	(Sri Lanka) Ranithma Liyanage	Cancelled		
8 April	Letshanaa Karupathevan (Malaysia)	N/P	(Philippines) Mikaela de Guzman	Cancelled		

=== Group C ===
Pos	Team	Pld	W	L	GF	GA	GD	PF	PA	PD	Pts
1	(Hong Kong) Saloni Samirbhai Mehta	2	2	0	4	0	+4	84	44	+40	2
2	(Macau) Pui Chi Wa	2	1	1	2	3	−1	88	92	−4	1
3	(Kazakhstan) Kamila Smagulova	2	0	2	1	4	−3	65	101	−36	0

Updated to match(es) played on unknown. Source: Badminton Asia

Date		Score		Set 1	Set 2	Set 3
8 April	Saloni Samirbhai Mehta (Hong Kong)	2–0	(Macau) Pui Chi Wa	21–10	21–19	–
8 April	Kamila Smagulova (Kazakhstan)	0–2	(Hong Kong) Saloni Samirbhai Mehta	12–21	3–21	–
8 April	Kamila Smagulova (Kazakhstan)	1–2	(Macau) Pui Chi Wa	21–17	14–21	15–21

=== Group D ===
Pos	Team	Pld	W	L	GF	GA	GD	PF	PA	PD	Pts
1	(Chinese Taipei) Huang Yu-hsun	2	2	0	4	0	+4	84	36	+48	2
2	(Singapore) Jaslyn Hooi	2	1	1	2	2	0	59	61	−2	1
3	(Saudi Arabia) Khadijah Kawthar	2	0	2	0	4	−4	38	84	−46	0

Updated to match(es) played on unknown. Source: Badminton Asia

Date		Score		Set 1	Set 2	Set 3
8 April	Jaslyn Hooi (Singapore)	0–2	(Chinese Taipei) Huang Yu-hsun	14–21	3–21	–
8 April	Khadijah Kawthar (Saudi Arabia)	0–2	(Chinese Taipei) Huang Yu-hsun	4–21	15–21	–
8 April	Khadijah Kawthar (Saudi Arabia)	0–2	(Singapore) Jaslyn Hooi	7–21	12–21	–

== Men's doubles ==
=== Seeds ===
1. (Thailand) Pongsakorn Thongkham / Wongsathorn Thongkham (promoted to main draw)
2. (Japan) Kazuki Shibata / Naoki Yamada (promoted to main draw)

=== Group A ===
Pos	Team	Pld	W	L	GF	GA	GD	PF	PA	PD	Pts
1	(Thailand) Pongsakorn Thongkham (Thailand) Wongsathorn Thongkham [1] (P)	0	0	0	0	0	0	0	0	0	0
2	(Macau) Pui Chi Chon (Macau) Pui Pang Fong	0	0	0	0	0	0	0	0	0	0

Updated to match(es) played on unknown. Source: Badminton Asia
(P) Promoted

Date		Score		Set 1	Set 2	Set 3
8 April	Pongsakorn Thongkham (Thailand); Wongsathorn Thongkham (Thailand)	N/P	(Macau) Pui Chi Chon (Macau) Pui Pang Fong	Cancelled		

=== Group B ===
Pos	Team	Pld	W	L	GF	GA	GD	PF	PA	PD	Pts
1	(Sri Lanka) Madhuka Dulanjana (Sri Lanka) Lahiru Weerasinghe	1	1	0	2	0	+2	42	28	+14	1
2	(Japan) Kazuki Shibata (Japan) Naoki Yamada [2] (P)	0	0	0	0	0	0	0	0	0	0
3	(Brunei) Marhanif Ali (Brunei) Mohamad Iqbal Asyraf Mohamad	1	0	1	0	2	−2	28	42	−14	0

Updated to match(es) played on unknown. Source: Badminton Asia
(P) Promoted

Date		Score		Set 1	Set 2	Set 3
8 April	Marhanif Ali (Brunei); Mohamad Iqbal Asyraf Mohamad (Brunei)	0–2	(Sri Lanka) Madhuka Dulanjana (Sri Lanka) Lahiru Weerasinghe	15–21	13–21	–
8 April	Kazuki Shibata (Japan); Naoki Yamada (Japan)	N/P	(Sri Lanka) Madhuka Dulanjana (Sri Lanka) Lahiru Weerasinghe	Cancelled		
8 April	Kazuki Shibata (Japan); Naoki Yamada (Japan)	N/P	(Brunei) Marhanif Ali (Brunei) Mohamad Iqbal Asyraf Mohamad	Cancelled		

=== Group C ===
Pos	Team	Pld	W	L	GF	GA	GD	PF	PA	PD	Pts
1	(Bangladesh) Jumar Al-Amin (Bangladesh) Moajjam Hossain Ohidul	2	2	0	4	0	+4	86	56	+30	2
2	(Iran) Mehdi Ansari (Iran) Amirhossein Hasani	2	1	1	2	2	0	75	63	+12	1
3	(Saudi Arabia) Fahad Almalki (Saudi Arabia) Yazan Saigh	2	0	2	0	4	−4	42	84	−42	0

Updated to match(es) played on unknown. Source: Badminton Asia

Date		Score		Set 1	Set 2	Set 3
8 April	Mehdi Ansari (Iran); Amirhossein Hasani (Iran)	0–2	(Bangladesh) Jumar Al-Amin (Bangladesh) Moajjam Hossain Ohidul	12–21	21–23	–
8 April	Fahad Almalki (Saudi Arabia); Yazan Saigh (Saudi Arabia)	0–2	(Iran) Mehdi Ansari (Iran) Amirhossein Hasani	6–21	13–21	–
8 April	Fahad Almalki (Saudi Arabia); Yazan Saigh (Saudi Arabia)	0–2	(Bangladesh) Jumar Al-Amin (Bangladesh) Moajjam Hossain Ohidul	12–21	11–21	–

=== Group D ===
Pos	Team	Pld	W	L	GF	GA	GD	PF	PA	PD	Pts
1	(Hong Kong) Hung Kuei Chun (Hong Kong) Lui Chun Wai	2	2	0	4	1	+3	102	79	+23	2
2	(Vietnam) Nguyễn Đình Hoàng (Vietnam) Trần Đình Mạnh	2	1	1	3	2	+1	95	89	+6	1
3	(Kazakhstan) Dmitriy Panarin (Kazakhstan) Makhsut Tajibullayev	2	0	2	0	4	−4	55	84	−29	0

Updated to match(es) played on unknown. Source: Badminton Asia

Date		Score		Set 1	Set 2	Set 3
8 April	Nguyễn Đình Hoàng (Vietnam); Trần Đình Mạnh (Vietnam)	0–2	(Hong Kong) Hung Kuei Chun (Hong Kong) Lui Chun Wai	18–21	21–16	21–16
8 April	Dmitriy Panarin (Kazakhstan); Makhsut Tajibullayev (Kazakhstan)	0–2	(Vietnam) Nguyễn Đình Hoàng (Vietnam) Trần Đình Mạnh	15–21	14–21	–
8 April	Dmitriy Panarin (Kazakhstan); Makhsut Tajibullayev (Kazakhstan)	0–2	(Hong Kong) Hung Kuei Chun (Hong Kong) Lui Chun Wai	10–21	16–21	–

== Women's doubles ==
=== Seeds ===
1. (Thailand) Tidapron Kleebyeesun / Nattamon Laisuan (promoted to main draw)
2. (Malaysia) Ong Xin Yee / Carmen Ting (promoted to main draw)

=== Group A ===
Pos	Team	Pld	W	L	GF	GA	GD	PF	PA	PD	Pts
1	(Thailand) Tidapron Kleebyeesun (Thailand) Nattamon Laisuan [1] (P)	0	0	0	0	0	0	0	0	0	0
2	(Sri Lanka) Isuri Attanayake (Sri Lanka) Sithumi de Silva	0	0	0	0	0	0	0	0	0	0

Updated to match(es) played on unknown. Source: Badminton Asia
(P) Promoted

Date		Score		Set 1	Set 2	Set 3
8 April	Tidapron Kleebyeesun (Thailand); Nattamon Laisuan (Thailand)	N/P	(Sri Lanka) Isuri Attanayake (Sri Lanka) Sithumi de Silva	Cancelled		

=== Group B ===
Pos	Team	Pld	W	L	GF	GA	GD	PF	PA	PD	Pts
1	(Hong Kong) Fu Chi Yan (Hong Kong) Leung Sze Lok	1	1	0	2	0	+2	42	19	+23	1
2	(Malaysia) Ong Xin Yee (Malaysia) Carmen Ting [2] (P)	0	0	0	0	0	0	0	0	0	0
3	(Macau) Ng Weng Chi (Macau) Pui Chi Wa	1	0	1	0	2	−2	19	42	−23	0

Updated to match(es) played on unknown. Source: Badminton Asia
(P) Promoted

Date		Score		Set 1	Set 2	Set 3
8 April	Ng Weng Chi (Macau); Pui Chi Wa (Macau)	0–2	(Hong Kong) Fu Chi Yan (Hong Kong) Leung Sze Lok	8–21	11–21	–
8 April	Ong Xin Yee (Malaysia); Carmen Ting (Malaysia)	N/P	(Macau) Ng Weng Chi (Macau) Pui Chi Wa	Cancelled		
8 April	Ong Xin Yee (Malaysia); Carmen Ting (Malaysia)	N/P	(Hong Kong) Fu Chi Yan (Hong Kong) Leung Sze Lok	Cancelled		

=== Group C ===
Pos	Team	Pld	W	L	GF	GA	GD	PF	PA	PD	Pts
1	(Singapore) Heng Xiao En (Singapore) Jin Yujia	1	1	0	2	0	+2	42	21	+21	1
2	(United Arab Emirates) Mysha Omer Khan (United Arab Emirates) Taabia Khan (P)	0	0	0	0	0	0	0	0	0	0
3	(Sri Lanka) Hasini Ambalangodage (Sri Lanka) Hasara Wijayarathne	1	0	1	0	2	−2	21	42	−21	0

Updated to match(es) played on unknown. Source: Badminton Asia
(P) Promoted

Date		Score		Set 1	Set 2	Set 3
8 April	Hasini Ambalangodage (Sri Lanka); Hasara Wijayarathne (Sri Lanka)	0–2	(Singapore) Heng Xiao En (Singapore) Jin Yujia	12–21	9–21	–
8 April	Mysha Omer Khan (United Arab Emirates); Taabia Khan (United Arab Emirates)	N/P	(Singapore) Heng Xiao En (Singapore) Jin Yujia	Cancelled		
8 April	Mysha Omer Khan (United Arab Emirates); Taabia Khan (United Arab Emirates)	N/P	(Sri Lanka) Hasini Ambalangodage (Sri Lanka) Hasara Wijayarathne	Cancelled		

=== Group D ===
Pos	Team	Pld	W	L	GF	GA	GD	PF	PA	PD	Pts
1	(Vietnam) Phạm Thị Diệu Ly (Vietnam) Phạm Thị Khánh	2	2	0	4	0	+4	89	60	+29	2
2	(Malaysia) Lee Zhi Qing (Malaysia) Tio Sue Xin	2	1	1	2	3	−1	82	101	−19	1
3	(Philippines) Airah Mae Nicole Albo (Philippines) Eleanor Christine Inlayo	2	0	2	1	4	−3	89	99	−10	0

Updated to match(es) played on unknown. Source: Badminton Asia

Date		Score		Set 1	Set 2	Set 3
8 April	Lee Zhi Qing (Malaysia); Tio Sue Xin (Malaysia)	2–1	(Philippines) Airah Mae Nicole Albo (Philippines) Eleanor Christine Inlayo	21–17	8–21	23–21
8 April	Phạm Thị Diệu Ly (Vietnam); Phạm Thị Khánh (Vietnam)	2–0	(Philippines) Airah Mae Nicole Albo (Philippines) Eleanor Christine Inlayo	21–18	21–12	–
8 April	Phạm Thị Diệu Ly (Vietnam); Phạm Thị Khánh (Vietnam)	2–0	(Malaysia) Lee Zhi Qing (Malaysia) Tio Sue Xin	26–24	21–6	–

== Mixed doubles ==
=== Seeds ===
1. (Japan) Hiroki Nishi / Akari Sato (qualified)
2. (Japan) Yuta Watanabe / Maya Taguchi (withdrew)

=== Group A ===
Pos	Team	Pld	W	L	GF	GA	GD	PF	PA	PD	Pts
1	(Japan) Hiroki Nishi (Japan) Akari Sato [1]	2	2	0	4	0	+4	84	47	+37	2
2	(Hong Kong) Hung Kuei Chun (Hong Kong) Tsang Hiu Yan	2	1	1	2	2	0	70	67	+3	1
3	(Vietnam) Đinh Mạnh Trần (Vietnam) Phạm Thị Khánh	2	0	2	0	4	−4	44	84	−40	0

Updated to match(es) played on unknown. Source: Badminton Asia

Date		Score		Set 1	Set 2	Set 3
8 April	Hung Kuei Chun (Hong Kong); Tsang Hiu Yan (Hong Kong)	0–2	(Japan) Hiroki Nishi (Japan) Akari Sato	11–21	17–21	–
8 April	Trần Đinh Mạnh (Vietnam); Phạm Thị Khánh (Vietnam)	0–2	(Japan) Hiroki Nishi (Japan) Akari Sato	11–21	8–21	–
8 April	Trần Đinh Mạnh (Vietnam); Phạm Thị Khánh (Vietnam)	0–2	(Hong Kong) Hung Kuei Chun (Hong Kong) Tsang Hiu Yan	10–21	15–21	–

=== Group B ===
Pos	Team	Pld	W	L	GF	GA	GD	PF	PA	PD	Pts
1	(Philippines) Julius Villabrille (Philippines) Airah Mae Nicole Albo	0	0	0	0	0	0	0	0	0	0
2	(Thailand) Phuwanat Horbanluekit (Thailand) Fungfa Korpthammakit (Z)	0	0	0	0	0	0	0	0	0	0
3	(Japan) Yuta Watanabe (Japan) Maya Taguchi [2] (Z)	0	0	0	0	0	0	0	0	0	0

Updated to match(es) played on unknown. Source: Badminton Asia
(Z) Withdrew

Date		Score		Set 1	Set 2	Set 3
8 April	Yuta Watanabe (Japan); Maya Taguchi (Japan)	N/P	(Thailand) Phuwanat Horbanluekit (Thailand) Fungfa Korpthammakit	Cancelled		
8 April	Julius Villabrille (Philippines); Airah Mae Nicole Albo (Philippines)	N/P	(Japan) Yuta Watanabe (Japan) Maya Taguchi	Cancelled		
8 April	Julius Villabrille (Philippines); Airah Mae Nicole Albo (Philippines)	N/P	(Thailand) Phuwanat Horbanluekit (Thailand) Fungfa Korpthammakit	Cancelled		

=== Group C ===
Pos	Team	Pld	W	L	GF	GA	GD	PF	PA	PD	Pts
1	(Sri Lanka) Thulith Palliyaguru (Sri Lanka) Panchali Adhikari	2	2	0	4	1	+3	95	92	+3	2
2	(Vietnam) Phạm Văn Hải (Vietnam) Vân Anh Thân	2	1	1	3	2	+1	98	89	+9	1
3	(Bangladesh) Jumar Al-Amin (Bangladesh) Urmi Akter	2	0	2	0	4	−4	74	86	−12	0

Updated to match(es) played on unknown. Source: Badminton Asia

Date		Score		Set 1	Set 2	Set 3
8 April	Jumar Al-Amin (Bangladesh); Urmi Akter (Bangladesh)	0–2	(Vietnam) Phạm Văn Hải (Vietnam) Vân Anh Thân	17–21	20–22	–
8 April	Thulith Palliyaguru (Sri Lanka); Panchali Adhikari (Sri Lanka)	2–1	(Vietnam) Phạm Văn Hải (Vietnam) Vân Anh Thân	21–14	9–21	22–20
8 April	Thulith Palliyaguru (Sri Lanka); Panchali Adhikari (Sri Lanka)	2–0	(Bangladesh) Jumar Al-Amin (Bangladesh) Urmi Akter	22–20	21–17	–

=== Group D ===
Pos	Team	Pld	W	L	GF	GA	GD	PF	PA	PD	Pts
1	(Macau) Leong Iok Chong (Macau) Ng Weng Chi	2	2	0	4	0	+4	84	32	+52	2
2	(Kazakhstan) Dmitriy Panarin (Kazakhstan) Aisha Zhumabek	2	1	1	2	2	0	57	62	−5	1
3	(Saudi Arabia) Yazan Saigh (Saudi Arabia) Khadijah Kawthar	2	0	2	0	4	−4	37	84	−47	0

Updated to match(es) played on unknown. Source: Badminton Asia

Date		Score		Set 1	Set 2	Set 3
8 April	Yazan Saigh (Saudi Arabia); Khadijah Kawthar (Saudi Arabia)	0–2	(Macau) Leong Iok Chong (Macau) Ng Weng Chi	9–21	8–21	–
8 April	Dmitriy Panarin (Kazakhstan); Aisha Zhumabek (Kazakhstan)	0–2	(Macau) Leong Iok Chong (Macau) Ng Weng Chi	8–21	7–21	–
8 April	Dmitriy Panarin (Kazakhstan); Aisha Zhumabek (Kazakhstan)	2–0	(Saudi Arabia) Yazan Saigh (Saudi Arabia) Khadijah Kawthar	21–8	21–12	–
