= 2026 French Open (badminton) =

Badminton tournament in France

Tournament details
- Dates: 20–25 October
- Edition: 94th
- Level: Super 750
- Total prize money: US$950,000
- Venue: Arena Grand Paris
- Location: Tremblay-en-France, France

Champions
- Men's singles: (France) Christo Popov
- Women's singles: (South Korea) An Se-young
- Men's doubles: (Malaysia) Man Wei Chong (Malaysia) Tee Kai Wun
- Women's doubles: (Japan) Yuki Fukushima (Japan) Mayu Matsumoto
- Mixed doubles: (China) Feng Yanzhe (China) Huang Dongping

The 2026 French Open (officially known as the Yonex Internationaux de France de Badminton 2026 for sponsorship reasons) was a badminton tournament that took place at the Arena Grand Paris in Tremblay-en-France, France, from 20 to 25 October 2026 and had a total prize of US$950,000.

== Tournament ==
The 2026 French Open was the twenty-seventh tournament of the 2026 BWF World Tour and the French Open championships, which have been held since 1908. This tournament is organized by the French Badminton Federation with sanction from the BWF.

The tournament was one of several HSBC BWF World Tour events selected to trial the federation's Time Clock system, which will be implemented in all matches. Under the regulations, the clock starts when the umpire updates the score, and players have 25 seconds to be ready to serve or receive. Umpires retain discretion to allow additional time in exceptional circumstances, including injuries, disputes and referee interventions.

=== Venue ===
This tournament was held at the Arena Grand Paris in Tremblay-en-France, France.

=== Point distribution ===
Below is the point distribution table for each phase of the tournament based on the BWF points system for the BWF World Tour Super 750 event.

Winner	Runner-up	3/4	5/8	9/16	17/32
11,000	9,350	7,700	6,050	4,320	2,660

=== Prize pool ===
The total prize money is US$950,000 with the distribution of the prize money in accordance with BWF regulations.

Event	Winner	Finalist	Semi-finals	Quarter-finals	Last 16	Last 32
Singles	$66,500	$32,300	$13,300	$5,225	$2,850	$950
Doubles	$70,300	$33,250	$13,300	$5,937.5	$3,087.5	$950

== Men's singles ==
=== Seeds ===
1. (Thailand) Kunlavut Vitidsarn (first round)
2. (Denmark) Anders Antonsen (first round)
3. (France) Christo Popov (champion)
4. (Indonesia) Jonatan Christie (first round)
5. (Chinese Taipei) Chou Tien-chen (second round)
6. (Japan) Kodai Naraoka (quarter-finals)
7. (France) Alex Lanier (semi-finals)
8. (Canada) Victor Lai (first round)

=== Finals ===
Semi-finals
7	(France) Alex Lanier	16	21	17
(Indonesia) Zaki Ubaidillah	21	16	21
3	(France) Christo Popov	21	21
PFR	(China) Hu Zhe'an	14	10

Final
(Indonesia) Zaki Ubaidillah	11	21	13
3	(France) Christo Popov	21	14	21

=== Top half ===
==== Section 1 ====
First round
1	(Thailand) K Vitidsarn	21	14	15
(France) T J Popov	9	21	21
(Republic of Ireland) N Nguyen	21	16	12
(Singapore) J Teh	14	21	21
7	(France) A Lanier	21	21
(Hong Kong) J Gunawan	19	16
(Chinese Taipei) Lee C-h	10	16
(Thailand) Pan Teeraratsakul	21	21

Second round
(France) T J Popov	21	21
(Singapore) J Teh	10	14
7	(France) A Lanier	22	21
(Thailand) Pan Teeraratsakul	20	13

Quarter-finals
(France) T J Popov	21	16	16
7	(France) A Lanier	16	21	21

==== Section 2 ====
First round
4	(Indonesia) J Christie	21	17	17
(Indonesia) Z Ubaidillah	16	21	21
(Japan) K Watanabe	21	21
(Malaysia) Leong J H	15	11
5	(Chinese Taipei) Chou T-c	21	12	21
(Japan) Y Tanaka	16	21	17
(Chinese Taipei) Chi Y-j	22	17	21
(Japan) K Nishimoto	20	21	14

Second round
(Indonesia) Z Ubaidillah	21	21
(Japan) K Watanabe	17	14
5	(Chinese Taipei) Chou T-c	18	22	17
(Chinese Taipei) Chi Y-j	21	20	21

Quarter-finals
(Indonesia) Z Ubaidillah	21	21
(Chinese Taipei) Chi Y-j	15	13

=== Bottom half ===
==== Section 3 ====
First round
(India) S Kidambi	21	16	12
(India) A Shetty	19	21	21
(India) L Sen
6	(Japan) K Naraoka	w	/	o
(Denmark) R Gemke	16	23	21
(Japan) Y Okimoto	21	21	10
(France) A Merklé	17	7
3	(France) C Popov	21	21

Second round
(India) A Shetty	17	6^{r}
6	(Japan) K Naraoka	21	11
(Denmark) R Gemke	18	21	18
3	(France) C Popov	21	15	21

Quarter-finals
6	(Japan) K Naraoka	15	16
3	(France) C Popov	21	21

==== Section 4 ====
First round
(Canada) B Yang	20	19
(Hong Kong) Lee C Y	22	21
PFR	(China) Hu ZA	21	21
8	(Canada) V Lai	9	17
(Chinese Taipei) Lin C-y	16	21	18
(Indonesia) A Farhan	21	13	21
(Hong Kong) Ng K L	21	21
2	(Denmark) A Antonsen	18	19

Second round
(Hong Kong) Lee C Y	21	22	9
PFR	(China) Hu ZA	12	24	21
(Indonesia) A Farhan	21	21
(Hong Kong) Ng K L	18	17

Quarter-finals
PFR	(China) Hu ZA	21	21
(Indonesia) A Farhan	19	12

== Women's singles ==
=== Seeds ===
1. (South Korea) An Se-young (champion)
2. (China) Wang Zhiyi (second round)
3. (Japan) Akane Yamaguchi (second round)
4. (Thailand) Ratchanok Intanon (first round)
5. (Indonesia) Putri Kusuma Wardani (quarter-finals)
6. (Japan) Tomoka Miyazaki (withdrew)
7. (China) Han Yue (quarter-finals)
8. (Thailand) Pornpawee Chochuwong (second round)

=== Finals ===
Semi-finals
1	(South Korea) An Se-young	21	21
(Japan) Nozomi Okuhara	12	19
SWM	(India) P. V. Sindhu	21	20	21
(Japan) Hina Akechi	10	22	16

Final
1	(South Korea) An Se-young	16	21	21
SWM	(India) P. V. Sindhu	21	11	12

=== Top half ===
==== Section 1 ====
First round
1	(South Korea) An S-y	21	21
PFR	(Denmark) A Schulz	6	4
(India) T Sharma	21	21
(India) I Baruah	12	12
7	(China) Han Y	21	21
(Denmark) L Christophersen	16	11
(Scotland) K Gilmour	9	22
(Denmark) M Blichfeldt	21	24

Second round
1	(South Korea) An S-y	21	21
(India) T Sharma	11	14
7	(China) Han Y	11	21	21
(Denmark) M Blichfeldt	21	13	8

Quarter-finals
1	(South Korea) An S-y	21	21
7	(China) Han Y	13	16

==== Section 2 ====
First round
3	(Japan) A Yamaguchi	21	21
(Chinese Taipei) Lin H-t	13	18
(India) A Chaliha	21	24
(China) Han QX	18	22
8	(Thailand) P Chochuwong	23	21
(Malaysia) Letshanaa K	21	15
(Japan) N Okuhara	21	21
(Japan) N Nidaira	15	16

Second round
3	(Japan) A Yamaguchi	19	18
(India) A Chaliha	21	21
8	(Thailand) P Chochuwong	21	27	12
(Japan) N Okuhara	16	29	21

Quarter-finals
(India) A Chaliha	10	21	16
(Japan) N Okuhara	21	17	21

=== Bottom half ===
==== Section 3 ====
First round
(India) U Hooda	18	21	17
(Japan) R Gunji	21	12	21
(Thailand) S Katethong	14	21	21
SWM	(India) P. V. Sindhu	21	8	23
(Chinese Taipei) Chiu P-c	21	21
(Bulgaria) K Nalbantova	13	11
(South Korea) Sim Y-j	21	21
4	(Thailand) R Intanon	15	18

Second round
(Japan) R Gunji	12	16
SWM	(India) P. V. Sindhu	21	21
(Chinese Taipei) Chiu P-c	22	21
(South Korea) Sim Y-j	20	18

Quarter-finals
SWM	(India) P. V. Sindhu	21	21
(Chinese Taipei) Chiu P-c	13	14

==== Section 4 ====
First round
(Denmark) L Kjærsfeldt	11	14
(Turkey) N Arın	21	21
(India) D Sihag	9	21	20
5	(Indonesia) P K Wardani	21	16	22
(Canada) M Li	14	10
(Japan) H Akechi	21	21
(Chinese Taipei) Huang Y-h	13	8
2	(China) Wang ZY	21	21

Second round
(Turkey) N Arın	9	8
5	(Indonesia) P K Wardani	21	21
(Japan) H Akechi	21	22
2	(China) Wang ZY	19	20

Quarter-finals
5	(Indonesia) P K Wardani	17	18
(Japan) H Akechi	21	21

== Men's doubles ==
=== Seeds ===
1. (South Korea) Kim Won-ho / Seo Seung-jae (quarter-finals)
2. (China) Liang Weikeng / Wang Chang (first round)
3. (Indonesia) Fajar Alfian / Muhammad Shohibul Fikri (first round)
4. (Malaysia) Aaron Chia / Soh Wooi Yik (quarter-finals)
5. (India) Satwiksairaj Rankireddy / Chirag Shetty (first round)
6. (Malaysia) Goh Sze Fei / Nur Izzuddin (final)
7. (Indonesia) Sabar Karyaman Gutama / Muhammad Reza Pahlevi Isfahani (first round)
8. (Japan) Takuro Hoki / Yugo Kobayashi (second round)

=== Finals ===
Semi-finals
6	(Malaysia) Goh Sze Fei (Malaysia) Nur Izzuddin	22	21
(Indonesia) Leo Rolly Carnando (Indonesia) Daniel Marthin	20	9
(Malaysia) Man Wei Chong (Malaysia) Tee Kai Wun	21	21
(Indonesia) Raymond Indra (Indonesia) Nikolaus Joaquin	16	15

Final
6	(Malaysia) Goh Sze Fei (Malaysia) Nur Izzuddin	21	15	7
(Malaysia) Man Wei Chong (Malaysia) Tee Kai Wun	13	21	21

=== Top half ===
==== Section 1 ====
First round
1	(South Korea) Kim W-h (South Korea) Seo S-j	21	21
(Japan) H Okamura (Japan) K Yamashita	12	9
(United States) Chen Z-y (United States) P Smith	18	21	12
(Malaysia) A Tai (Malaysia) Yap R K	21	18	21
6	(Malaysia) Goh S F (Malaysia) N Izzuddin	21	19	21
(Denmark) C F Kjær (Denmark) R Kjær	17	21	17
(Denmark) D Lundgaard (Denmark) M Vestergaard	21	30
(Chinese Taipei) Lee J-h (Chinese Taipei) Yang P-h	18	29

Second round
1	(South Korea) Kim W-h (South Korea) Seo S-j	21	21
(Malaysia) A Tai (Malaysia) Yap R K	14	16
6	(Malaysia) Goh S F (Malaysia) N Izzuddin	21	14	21
(Denmark) D Lundgaard (Denmark) M Vestergaard	6	21	18

Quarter-finals
1	(South Korea) Kim W-h (South Korea) Seo S-j	15	18
6	(Malaysia) Goh S F (Malaysia) N Izzuddin	21	21

==== Section 2 ====
First round
3	(Indonesia) F Alfian (Indonesia) M S Fikri	24	13
(Chinese Taipei) Chiu H-c (Chinese Taipei) Wang C-l	26	21
(Indonesia) A F Rayhan (Indonesia) D A Wahyudi	19	20
(South Korea) Kang M-h (South Korea) Lee J-m	21	22
5	(India) S Rankireddy (India) C Shetty	19	21	13
(France) C Popov (France) T J Popov	21	18	21
(Chinese Taipei) Lee F-c (Chinese Taipei) Lee F-j	18	15
(Indonesia) L R Carnando (Indonesia) D Marthin	21	21

Second round
(Chinese Taipei) Chiu H-c (Chinese Taipei) Wang C-l	19	17
(South Korea) Kang M-h (South Korea) Lee J-m	21	21
(France) C Popov (France) T J Popov	9	15
(Indonesia) L R Carnando (Indonesia) D Marthin	21	21

Quarter-finals
(South Korea) Kang M-h (South Korea) Lee J-m	14	19
(Indonesia) L R Carnando (Indonesia) D Marthin	21	21

=== Bottom half ===
==== Section 3 ====
First round
(Malaysia) Man W C (Malaysia) Tee K W	18	21	21
(Japan) K Kumagai (Japan) H Nishi	21	15	17
(England) B Lane (England) S Vendy	21	22
8	(Japan) T Hoki (Japan) Y Kobayashi	23	24
(Malaysia) N M Azriyn A (Malaysia) Tan W K	21	10	19
(Thailand) P Sukphun (Thailand) Pak Teeraratsakul	19	21	21
(China) He JT (China) Ren XY	15	19
4	(Malaysia) A Chia (Malaysia) Soh W Y	21	21

Second round
(Malaysia) Man W C (Malaysia) Tee K W	25	21
8	(Japan) T Hoki (Japan) Y Kobayashi	23	14
(Thailand) P Sukphun (Thailand) Pak Teeraratsakul
4	(Malaysia) A Chia (Malaysia) Soh W Y	w	/	o

Quarter-finals
(Malaysia) Man W C (Malaysia) Tee K W	5
4	(Malaysia) A Chia (Malaysia) Soh W Y	0^{r}

==== Section 4 ====
First round
(Denmark) K Astrup (Denmark) A S Rasmussen	22	21	18
(China) Chen BY (China) Liu Y	24	16	21
(Indonesia) R Indra (Indonesia) N Joaquin	21	21
7	(Indonesia) S K Gutama (Indonesia) M R P Isfahani	18	17
(China) Hu KY (China) Lin XY	21	21
(Malaysia) Chia W J (Malaysia) Teo E Y	16	15
(Chinese Taipei) Chen Z-r (Chinese Taipei) Lin Y-c	21	21
2	(China) Liang WK (China) Wang C	16	15

Second round
(China) Chen BY (China) Liu Y	22	20
(Indonesia) R Indra (Indonesia) N Joaquin	24	22
(China) Hu KY (China) Lin XY	21	23
(Chinese Taipei) Chen Z-r (Chinese Taipei) Lin Y-c	15	21

Quarter-finals
(Indonesia) R Indra (Indonesia) N Joaquin	23	21
(China) Hu KY (China) Lin XY	21	18

== Women's doubles ==
=== Seeds ===
1. (Japan) Yuki Fukushima / Mayu Matsumoto (champions)
2. (Malaysia) Pearly Tan / Thinaah Muralitharan (final)
3. (Japan) Rin Iwanaga / Kie Nakanishi (semi-finals)
4. (Chinese Taipei) Hsu Yin-hui / Lin Jhih-yun (first round)
5. (Indonesia) Rachel Allessya Rose / Febi Setianingrum (semi-finals)
6. (China) Bao Lijing / Cao Zihan (first round)
7. (Indonesia) Febriana Dwipuji Kusuma / Meilysa Trias Puspita Sari (first round)
8. (Bulgaria) Gabriela Stoeva / Stefani Stoeva (quarter-finals)

=== Finals ===
Semi-finals
1	(Japan) Yuki Fukushima (Japan) Mayu Matsumoto	21	21
5	(Indonesia) Rachel Allessya Rose (Indonesia) Febi Setianingrum	18	15
3	(Japan) Rin Iwanaga (Japan) Kie Nakanishi	17	20
2	(Malaysia) Pearly Tan (Malaysia) Thinaah Muralitharan	21	22

Final
1	(Japan) Yuki Fukushima (Japan) Mayu Matsumoto	10	21	21
2	(Malaysia) Pearly Tan (Malaysia) Thinaah Muralitharan	21	17	16

=== Top half ===
==== Section 1 ====
First round
1	(Japan) Y Fukushima (Japan) M Matsumoto	16	21	22
(Japan) N Hara (Japan) R Kiyose	21	14	20
(Chinese Taipei) Hsu Y-c (Chinese Taipei) Sung Y-h	16	10
(United States) L Lam (United States) A Lee	21	21
7	(Indonesia) F D Kusuma (Indonesia) M T Puspita Sari	19	14
(Indonesia) A C Pratiwi (Indonesia) S F S Ramadhanti	21	21
(India) T Jolly (India) G Gopichand	17	18
(Chinese Taipei) Lin C-c (Chinese Taipei) Yang C-y	21	21

Second round
1	(Japan) Y Fukushima (Japan) M Matsumoto	21	21
(United States) L Lam (United States) A Lee	12	19
(Indonesia) A C Pratiwi (Indonesia) S F S Ramadhanti	22	21
(Chinese Taipei) Lin C-c (Chinese Taipei) Yang C-y	20	8

Quarter-finals
1	(Japan) Y Fukushima (Japan) M Matsumoto	21	21
(Indonesia) A C Pratiwi (Indonesia) S F S Ramadhanti	17	18

==== Section 2 ====
First round
4	(Chinese Taipei) Hsu Y-h (Chinese Taipei) Lin J-y	21	21	14
(Japan) H Suzuki (Japan) N Yamakita	14	23	21
(China) Luo Y (China) Wang TG	21	19	18
(Japan) S Nakade (Japan) M Takahashi	14	21	21
5	(Indonesia) R A Rose (Indonesia) F Setianingrum	18	21	21
(Hong Kong) Lui L L (Hong Kong) Tsang H Y	21	11	16
(Hong Kong) Yeung N T (Hong Kong) Yeung P L	21	21
(Scotland) J MacPherson (Scotland) C Torrance	15	9

Second round
(Japan) H Suzuki (Japan) N Yamakita	21	21
(Japan) S Nakade (Japan) M Takahashi	9	15
5	(Indonesia) R A Rose (Indonesia) F Setianingrum	24	19	21
(Hong Kong) Yeung N T (Hong Kong) Yeung P L	22	21	18

Quarter-finals
(Japan) H Suzuki (Japan) N Yamakita	21	16	16
5	(Indonesia) R A Rose (Indonesia) F Setianingrum	18	21	21

=== Bottom half ===
==== Section 3 ====
First round
(Japan) R Hiramoto (Japan) C Shida	21	21
(India) R Panda (India) S Panda	6	11
(Japan) S Hirota (Japan) A Sakuramoto	17	23	21
6	(China) Bao LJ (China) Cao ZH	21	21	19
(Chinese Taipei) Chang C-h (Chinese Taipei) Yang C-t	10	21	9
(United States) F Corbett (United States) J Gai	21	19	21
(Japan) R Hirokami (Japan) S Hobara	12	22	16
3	(Japan) R Iwanaga (Japan) K Nakanishi	21	20	21

Second round
(Japan) R Hiramoto (Japan) C Shida	21	21
(Japan) S Hirota (Japan) A Sakuramoto	13	16
(United States) F Corbett (United States) J Gai	19	19
3	(Japan) R Iwanaga (Japan) K Nakanishi	21	21

Quarter-finals
(Japan) R Hiramoto (Japan) C Shida	18	21	15
3	(Japan) R Iwanaga (Japan) K Nakanishi	21	16	21

==== Section 4 ====
First round
(South Korea) Kim Y-j (South Korea) Lee Y-l	21	20	21
(Ukraine) P Buhrova (Ukraine) Y Kantemyr	13	22	9
(Denmark) K Vang (Denmark) M Werge	12	21	16
8	(Bulgaria) G Stoeva (Bulgaria) S Stoeva	21	19	21
(France) M Lambert (France) C Pognante	11	12
(Malaysia) Ong X Y (Malaysia) C Ting	21	21
(Turkey) B Erçetin (Turkey) N İnci	11	15
2	(Malaysia) P Tan (Malaysia) Thinaah M	21	21

Second round
(South Korea) Kim Y-j (South Korea) Lee Y-l	10	13
8	(Bulgaria) G Stoeva (Bulgaria) S Stoeva	21	21
(Malaysia) Ong X Y (Malaysia) C Ting	14	20
2	(Malaysia) P Tan (Malaysia) Thinaah M	21	22

Quarter-finals
8	(Bulgaria) G Stoeva (Bulgaria) S Stoeva	12	15
2	(Malaysia) P Tan (Malaysia) Thinaah M	21	21

== Mixed doubles ==
=== Seeds ===
1. (China) Feng Yanzhe / Huang Dongping (champions)
2. (China) Jiang Zhenbang / Wei Yaxin (second round)
3. (Denmark) Mathias Christiansen / Alexandra Bøje (quarter-finals)
4. (France) Thom Gicquel / Delphine Delrue (semi-finals)
5. (Thailand) Dechapol Puavaranukroh / Supissara Paewsampran (first round)
6. (China) Guo Xinwa / Chen Fanghui (semi-finals)
7. (Chinese Taipei) Ye Hong-wei / Nicole Gonzales Chan (second round)
8. (China) Cheng Xing / Zhang Chi (first round)

=== Finals ===
Semi-finals
1	(China) Feng Yanzhe (China) Huang Dongping	19	21	21
4	(France) Thom Gicquel (France) Delphine Delrue	21	17	19
6	(China) Guo Xinwa (China) Chen Fanghui	13	9
(Malaysia) Hoo Pang Ron (Malaysia) Lai Pei Jing	21	21

Final
1	(China) Feng Yanzhe (China) Huang Dongping	21	21
(Malaysia) Hoo Pang Ron (Malaysia) Lai Pei Jing	10	13

=== Top half ===
==== Section 1 ====
First round
1	(China) Feng YZ (China) Huang DP	21	21
(South Korea) Kim J-h (South Korea) Jang H-j	15	14
(France) J Maio (France) L Palermo	11	21	18
(Spain) R García (Spain) L Rodríguez	21	19	21
7	(Chinese Taipei) Ye H-w (Chinese Taipei) N G Chan	9	21	21
(United States) P Smith (United States) J Gai	21	17	18
(Indonesia) A Syahnawi (Indonesia) N V Marwah	22	21
(Malaysia) J Wong (Malaysia) Cheng S Y	20	18

Second round
1	(China) Feng YZ (China) Huang DP	21	21
(Spain) R García (Spain) L Rodríguez	15	12
7	(Chinese Taipei) Ye H-w (Chinese Taipei) N G Chan	14	12
(Indonesia) A Syahnawi (Indonesia) N V Marwah	21	21

Quarter-finals
1	(China) Feng YZ (China) Huang DP	13	21	21
(Indonesia) A Syahnawi (Indonesia) N V Marwah	21	13	13

==== Section 2 ====
First round
4	(France) T Gicquel (France) D Delrue	21	21
(England) C Hemming (England) E van Leeuwen	14	12
(Thailand) T Punpanich (Thailand) J Sudjaipraparat	15	11
(Chinese Taipei) Wu H-y (Chinese Taipei) Yang C-y	21	21
8	(China) Cheng X (China) Zhang C
(Japan) Y Watanabe (Japan) M Taguchi	w	/	o
(Chinese Taipei) Wu G-x (Chinese Taipei) Lee C-h	21	21
(Malaysia) Wong T C (Malaysia) Lim C S	12	10

Second round
4	(France) T Gicquel (France) D Delrue	21	21
(Chinese Taipei) Wu H-y (Chinese Taipei) Yang C-y	14	18
(Japan) Y Watanabe (Japan) M Taguchi	21	16	10
(Chinese Taipei) Wu G-x (Chinese Taipei) Lee C-h	18	21	21

Quarter-finals
4	(France) T Gicquel (France) D Delrue	21	21	21
(Chinese Taipei) Wu G-x (Chinese Taipei) Lee C-h	23	12	14

=== Bottom half ===
==== Section 3 ====
First round
(Thailand) Pak Teeraratsakul (Thailand) S Taerattanachai	21	16	21
(Indonesia) D Ferdinansyah (Indonesia) F Pasaribu	18	21	16
(Scotland) A Dunn (Scotland) J MacPherson	13	24
6	(China) Guo XW (China) Chen FH	21	26
(Chinese Taipei) Yang P-h (Chinese Taipei) Hu L-f	19	14
(Hong Kong) Chan Y C (Hong Kong) Ng T Y	21	21
(Japan) A Koga (Japan) N Saito	16	21	23
3	(Denmark) M Christiansen (Denmark) A Bøje	21	18	25

Second round
(Thailand) Pak Teeraratsakul (Thailand) S Taerattanachai	15	18
6	(China) Guo XW (China) Chen FH	21	21
(Hong Kong) Chan Y C (Hong Kong) Ng T Y	15	21	16
3	(Denmark) M Christiansen (Denmark) A Bøje	21	18	21

Quarter-finals
6	(China) Guo XW (China) Chen FH	12	21	21
3	(Denmark) M Christiansen (Denmark) A Bøje	21	9	9

==== Section 4 ====
First round
(Malaysia) Hoo P R (Malaysia) Lai P J	14	21	21
(China) Gao JX (China) Wu MY	21	15	15
(Chinese Taipei) Liu K-h (Chinese Taipei) Hsu Y-h	21	22	22
5	(Thailand) D Puavaranukroh (Thailand) S Paewsampran	13	24	20
(Malaysia) Goh S H (Malaysia) S J Lai	21	15	20
(Germany) M Seidel (Germany) T P Nguyen	17	21	22
(China) Zhu YJ (China) Li Q	21	17	13
2	(China) Jiang ZB (China) Wei YX	15	21	21

Second round
(Malaysia) Hoo P R (Malaysia) Lai P J	21	13	21
(Chinese Taipei) Liu K-h (Chinese Taipei) Hsu Y-h	13	21	17
(Germany) M Seidel (Germany) T P Nguyen	21	14	22
2	(China) Jiang ZB (China) Wei YX	17	21	20

Quarter-finals
(Malaysia) Hoo P R (Malaysia) Lai P J	21	20	21
(Germany) M Seidel (Germany) T P Nguyen	17	22	18

Preceded by 2026 Denmark Open; 2026 Malaysia Super 100	BWF World Tour; 2026 BWF season	Succeeded by 2026 Hylo Open
