= 2022 Badminton Asia Team Championships men's team squads =

This article will list the confirmed men's squads lists for the 2022 Badminton Asia Team Championships. The ranking stated are based on the BWF World Ranking date on 8 February 2022 as per tournament's prospectus. Chinese Taipei and Thailand withdrew.

== Group A ==
=== Indonesia ===
10 players are scheduled to represent Indonesia in the men's team competition of the 2022 Badminton Asia Team Championships.

Name	DoB/Age	Ranking of event	
Name	DoB/Age	MS	MD
Chico Aura Dwi Wardoyo	15 June 1998 (aged 23)	55	-
Ikhsan Rumbay	15 January 2000 (aged 22)	90	-
Christian Adinata	16 June 2001 (aged 20)	202	-
Yonathan Ramlie	31 January 2001 (aged 21)	305	-
Pramudya Kusumawardana	13 December 2000 (aged 21)	-	22
Yeremia Rambitan	15 October 1999 (aged 22)	-	22
Leo Rolly Carnando	29 July 2001 (aged 20)	-	28
Daniel Marthin	31 July 2001 (aged 20)	-	28
Muhammad Shohibul Fikri	16 November 1999 (aged 22)	-	29
Bagas Maulana	20 July 1998 (aged 23)	-	29

=== India ===
10 players are scheduled to represent India in the men's team competition of the 2022 Badminton Asia Team Championships.

Name	DoB/Age	Ranking of event	
Name	DoB/Age	MS	MD
Lakshya Sen	16 August 2001 (aged 20)	13	-
Kiran George	11 February 2000 (aged 22)	75	-
Mithun Manjunath	28 June 1998 (aged 23)	81	-
Raghu Mariswamy	14 February 1998 (aged 24)	135	-
Ravikrishna PS	23 October 2002 (aged 19)	-	140
Sankar Prasad Udayakumar	3 August 2002 (aged 19)	-	140
Manjit Singh Khwairakpam	17 March 2001 (aged 20)	-	259
Dingku Singh Konthoujam	28 March 2001 (aged 20)	-	259
Hariharan Amsakarunan	18 May 2003 (aged 18)	-	-
Ruban Kumar Rethinasabapathi	8 July 2003 (aged 18)	-	-

=== South Korea ===
10 players are scheduled to represent South Korea in the men's team competition of the 2022 Badminton Asia Team Championships.

Name	DoB/Age	Ranking of event	
Name	DoB/Age	MS	MD
Jeon Hyeok-jin	13 June 1995 (aged 26)	2075	-
Jeong Min-sun	4 June 1999 (aged 22)	-	-
Jin Yong	8 April 2003 (aged 18)	-	-
Kim Hwi-tae	14 February 1997 (aged 25)	-	-
Kim Jae-hwan	13 August 1996 (aged 25)	-	48
Kim Joo-wan	9 May 1997 (aged 24)	-	-
Na Sung-seung	28 August 1999 (aged 22)	-	64
Noh Jin-seong	15 February 2003 (aged 19)	-	-
Park Sang-yong	30 September 2001 (aged 20)	-	-
Yun Dae-il	6 September 1997 (aged 24)	-	-

=== Hong Kong ===
10 players are scheduled to represent Hong Kong in the men's team competition of the 2022 Badminton Asia Team Championships.

Name	DoB/Age	Ranking of event	
Name	DoB/Age	MS	MD
Ng Ka Long	24 June 1994 (aged 27)	9	-
Lee Cheuk Yiu	28 August 1996 (aged 25)	17	-
Chan Yin Chak	7 January 1999 (aged 23)	209	-
Jason Gunawan	18 June 2004 (aged 17)	-	-
Ho Wai Lun	21 December 1992 (aged 29)	-	-
Yeung Ming Nok	22 December 1995 (aged 26)	-	82
Law Cheuk Him	26 June 1994 (aged 27)	-	390
Chow Hin Long	6 April 2000 (aged 21)	-	651
Lui Chun Wai	10 January 2001 (aged 21)	-	651
Lee Chun Hei	25 January 1994 (aged 28)	-	660

== Group B ==
=== Japan ===
8 players are scheduled to represent Japan in the men's team competition of the 2022 Badminton Asia Team Championships.

Name	DoB/Age	Ranking of event	
Name	DoB/Age	MS	MD
Minoru Koga	30 September 1996 (aged 25)	129	-
Riku Hatano	19 June 2001 (aged 20)	340	-
Ayato Endo	19 June 2000 (aged 21)	-	848
Yuta Takei	29 November 2000 (aged 21)	-	848
Shuntaro Mezaki	27 June 2002 (aged 19)	-	-
Haruya Nishida	19 April 2002 (aged 19)	-	-
Koshiro Moriguchi	21 July 2003 (aged 18)	-	-
Koo Takahashi	20 September 2001 (aged 20)	-	-

=== Malaysia ===
12 players are scheduled to represent Malaysia in the men's team competition of the 2022 Badminton Asia Team Championships.

Name	DoB/Age	Ranking of event	
Name	DoB/Age	MS	MD
Lee Zii Jia	29 March 1998 (aged 23)	7	-
Ng Tze Yong	16 May 2000 (aged 21)	47	-
Aidil Sholeh	9 January 2000 (aged 22)	111	-
Leong Jun Hao	13 July 1999 (aged 22)	126	-
Lim Chong King	6 May 2000 (aged 21)	166	-
Kok Jing Hong	12 March 2002 (aged 19)	235	-
Aaron Chia	24 February 1997 (aged 24)	-	7
Soh Wooi Yik	17 February 1998 (aged 23)	-	7
Goh Sze Fei	18 August 1997 (aged 24)	-	17
Nur Izzuddin	11 November 1997 (aged 24)	-	17
Man Wei Chong	5 September 1999 (aged 22)	-	45
Tee Kai Wun	17 April 2000 (aged 21)	-	45

=== Singapore ===
10 players are scheduled to represent Singapore in the men's team competition of the 2022 Badminton Asia Team Championships.

Name	DoB/Age	Ranking of event	
Name	DoB/Age	MS	MD
Loh Kean Yew	26 June 1997 (aged 24)	12	-
Jason Teh	25 August 2000 (aged 21)	102	-
Joel Koh	23 November 2000 (aged 21)	274	-
Terry Hee	6 July 1995 (aged 26)	-	85
Loh Kean Hean	12 March 1995 (aged 26)	-	85
Danny Bawa Chrisnanta	30 December 1988 (aged 33)	-	247
Andy Kwek	22 April 1999 (aged 22)	-	247
Wesley Koh	13 July 2002 (aged 19)	-	785
Junsuke Kubo	11 May 2002 (aged 19)	-	785
Lim Ming Hong	23 March 2002 (aged 19)	-	-

=== Kazakhstan ===
6 players are scheduled to represent Kazakhstan in the men's team competition of the 2022 Badminton Asia Team Championships.

Name	DoB/Age	Ranking of event	
Name	DoB/Age	MS	MD
Jangir Ibrayev	11 June 2003 (aged 18)	-	-
Khaitmurat Kulmatov	19 February 1996 (aged 25)	689	785
Ilya Lysenko	15 November 2002 (aged 19)	-	-
Artur Niyazov	30 August 1993 (aged 28)	429	286
Andrey Shalagin	24 June 2002 (aged 19)	1569	785
Makhsut Tajibullayev	10 March 2004 (aged 17)	-	-
