= 2026 Korea Masters =

Badminton tournament in Korea

Tournament details
- Dates: 4–9 August
- Edition: 18th
- Level: Super 300
- Total prize money: US$250,000
- Venue: Yi Sun-sin Gymnasium
- Location: Asan, South Korea

Champions
- Men's singles: (China) Zhu Xuanchen
- Women's singles: (India) Ashmita Chaliha
- Men's doubles: (Malaysia) Tee Kai Wun (Malaysia) Yap Roy King
- Women's doubles: (China) Luo Yi (China) Wang Tingge
- Mixed doubles: (Japan) Yuta Watanabe (Japan) Maya Taguchi

The 2026 Korea Masters was a badminton tournament that took place at the Yi Sun-sin Gymnasium in Asan, South Korea, from 4 to 9 August 2026 and had a total prize pool of $240,000.

== Tournament ==
The 2026 Korea Masters was the twenty-second tournament of the 2026 BWF World Tour and also part of the Korea Masters championships, which have been held since 2007. This tournament was organized by the Badminton Korea Association with sanction from the BWF.

=== Venue ===
This tournament was held at the Yi Sun-sin Gymnasium in Asan, South Korea.

=== Point distribution ===
Below is the point distribution table for each phase of the tournament based on the BWF points system for the BWF World Tour Super 300 event.

Winner	Runner-up	3/4	5/8	9/16	17/32	33/64	65/128
7,000	5,950	4,900	3,850	2,750	1,670	660	320

=== Prize pool ===
The total prize money was US$240,000 with the distribution of the prize money in accordance with BWF regulations.

Event	Winner	Finalist	Semi-finals	Quarter-finals	Last 16
Singles	$18,000	$9,120	$3,480	$1,440	$840
Doubles	$18,960	$9,120	$3,360	$1,740	$900

== Men's singles ==
=== Seeds ===
1. (Japan) Yudai Okimoto (semi-finals)
2. (Singapore) Jason Teh (first round)
3. (India) Srikanth Kidambi (first round)
4. (South Korea) Jeon Hyeok-jin (second round)
5. (Hong Kong) Jason Gunawan (quarter-finals)
6. (China) Hu Zhe'an (quarter-finals)
7. (Chinese Taipei) Su Li-yang (quarter-finals)
8. (Chinese Taipei) Wang Po-wei (second round)

=== Finals ===
Semi-finals
1	(Japan) Yudai Okimoto	16	18
(South Korea) Yoo Tae-bin	21	21
(China) Zhu Xuanchen	21	16	21
(Malaysia) Cheam June Wei	8	21	12

Final
(South Korea) Yoo Tae-bin	16	21
(China) Zhu Xuanchen	21	23

=== Top half ===
==== Section 1 ====
First round
1	(Japan) Y Okimoto	21	13
(India) S Dayanand	11	4^{r}
Q1	(Japan) S Ogawa	15	21	19
Q2	(China) Sun C	21	17	21
5	(Hong Kong) J Gunawan	21	16	21
PFQ	(United States) M S Alcala	12	21	14
Q3	(Malaysia) Lim M H	21	16	8
(England) H Huang	16	21	21

Second round
1	(Japan) Y Okimoto	21	21
Q2	(China) Sun C	16	12
5	(Hong Kong) J Gunawan	21	21
(England) H Huang	14	9

Quarter-finals
1	(Japan) Y Okimoto	21	15	21
5	(Hong Kong) J Gunawan	17	21	18

==== Section 2 ====
First round
4	(South Korea) Jeon H-j	23	21
(India) R Chouhan	21	19
(South Korea) Yoo T-b	21	12	21
(India) T Mannepalli	13	21	19
8	(Chinese Taipei) Wang P-w	21	21
(Vietnam) Nguyễn H Đ	17	16
Q4	(South Korea) Park S-y	21	21
(India) K George	15	9

Second round
4	(South Korea) Jeon H-j	17	21	16
(South Korea) Yoo T-b	21	19	21
8	(Chinese Taipei) Wang P-w	19	18
Q4	(South Korea) Park S-y	21	21

Quarter-finals
(South Korea) Yoo T-b	21	21
Q4	(South Korea) Park S-y	16	8

=== Bottom half ===
==== Section 3 ====
First round
(Finland) J Oldorff	8	10
(Japan) R Takei	21	21
(Finland) K Koljonen	19	17
6	(China) Hu ZA	21	21
(China) Zhu XC	21	21
(India) M Manjunath	11	9
(Israel) D Dubovenko	22	14	21
3	(India) S Kidambi	20	21	12

Second round
(Japan) R Takei	19	19
6	(China) Hu ZA	21	21
(China) Zhu XC	22	21
(Israel) D Dubovenko	20	15

Quarter-finals
6	(China) Hu ZA	15	21	14
(China) Zhu XC	21	10	21

==== Section 4 ====
First round
(Malaysia) E Ewe	21	21
(Malaysia) Lee Z J	9	19
(Thailand) K Wangcharoen	13	16
7	(Chinese Taipei) Su L-y	21	21
(Japan) M Koga	8	16
(China) Dong TY	21	21
(Malaysia) Cheam J W	21	21
2	(Singapore) J Teh	13	19

Second round
(Malaysia) E Ewe	21	21	13
7	(Chinese Taipei) Su L-y	23	19	21
(China) Dong TY	10	13
(Malaysia) Cheam J W	21	21

Quarter-finals
7	(Chinese Taipei) Su L-y	21	21	18
(Malaysia) Cheam J W	23	10	21

== Women's singles ==
=== Seeds ===
1. (Japan) Hina Akechi (quarter-finals)
2. (Vietnam) Nguyễn Thùy Linh (first round)
3. (India) Tanvi Sharma (quarter-finals)
4. (China) Han Qianxi (final)
5. (India) Isharani Baruah (second round)
6. (Singapore) Yeo Jia Min (withdrew)
7. (India) Malvika Bansod (withdrew)
8. (India) Anmol Kharb (second round)

=== Finals ===
Semi-finals
SWM	(India) Ashmita Chaliha	21	16	21
SWM	(India) Rakshitha Ramraj	13	21	13
4	(China) Han Qianxi	22	18	21
Q2	(South Korea) Kim Ga-ram	20	21	14

Final
SWM	(India) Ashmita Chaliha	14	21	21
4	(China) Han Qianxi	21	14	14

=== Top half ===
==== Section 1 ====
First round
1	(Japan) H Akechi	21	22
(India) T Hemanth	16	20
(United States) I Jaiswal	22	13	21
(Czech Republic) T Švábíková	20	21	13
SWM	(India) A Chaliha	22	21
Q3	(Japan) R Hiramoto	20	18
(India) A Kashyap	22	21	3
(South Korea) Kim M-j	20	23	21

Second round
1	(Japan) H Akechi	21	21
(United States) I Jaiswal	18	16
SWM	(India) A Chaliha	21	21
(South Korea) Kim M-j	17	6

Quarter-finals
1	(Japan) H Akechi	22	15	19
SWM	(India) A Chaliha	20	21	21

==== Section 2 ====
First round
3	(India) T Sharma	21	21
Q1	(China) Yuan AQ	16	15
(India) S Valishetty	21	21
(Chinese Taipei) Pai Y-p	15	14
SWM	(India) R Ramraj	22	21	21
Q4	(South Korea) Yoo A-y	24	12	13
(Japan) M Suizu	21	21
PFQ	(Thailand) P Phannachet	6	16

Second round
3	(India) T Sharma	21	17	21
(India) S Valishetty	16	21	13
SWM	(India) R Ramraj	22	21
(Japan) M Suizu	20	10

Quarter-finals
3	(India) T Sharma	21	19	18
SWM	(India) R Ramraj	18	21	21

=== Bottom half ===
==== Section 3 ====
First round
PFQ	(Chinese Taipei) Wang P-y	21	16	10
PFQ	(Vietnam) Vũ T T	15	21	21
(Hong Kong) Lo S Y	21	17	12
8	(India) A Kharb	16	21	21
(South Korea) Kim J-e	21	19	9
(India) M Singh	14	21	21
(Malaysia) Kisona S	20	13
4	(China) Han QX	22	21

Second round
PFQ	(Vietnam) Vũ T T	23	15	21
8	(India) A Kharb	21	21	18
(India) M Singh	12	21	17
4	(China) Han QX	21	14	21

Quarter-finals
PFQ	(Vietnam) Vũ T T	9	19
4	(China) Han QX	21	21

==== Section 4 ====
First round
(Canada) C Hoang	13	13
(South Korea) Kim M-s	21	21
(South Korea) Lee S-y	18	21	7
5	(India) I Baruah	21	15	21
(South Korea) Park G-e	17	10
Q2	(South Korea) Kim G-r	21	21
(China) Xu WJ	21	21
2	(Vietnam) Nguyễn T L	10	10

Second round
(South Korea) Kim M-s	17	21	21
5	(India) I Baruah	21	18	19
Q2	(South Korea) Kim G-r	19	23	23
(China) Xu WJ	21	21	21

Quarter-finals
(South Korea) Kim M-s	12	8
Q2	(South Korea) Kim G-r	21	21

== Men's doubles ==
=== Seeds ===
1. (China) Hu Keyuan / Lin Xiangyi (second round)
2. (South Korea) Choi Sol-gyu / (Malaysia) Goh V Shem (second round)
3. (Chinese Taipei) He Zhi-wei / Huang Jui-hsuan (quarter-finals)
4. (Thailand) Chaloempon Charoenkitamorn / Worrapol Thongsa-nga (first round)
5. (Japan) Hiroki Okamura / Kyohei Yamashita (withdrew)
6. (Japan) Shuntaro Mezaki / Yuta Oku (quarter-finals)
7. (England) Oliver Butler / Samuel Jones (first round)
8. (Chinese Taipei) Lai Po-yu / Tsai Fu-cheng (first round)

=== Finals ===
Semi-finals
(Japan) Haruki Kawabe (Japan) Kenta Matsukawa	21	20	18
(Malaysia) Man Wei Chong (Malaysia) Soh Wooi Yik	18	22	21
(Japan) Shuji Sawada (Japan) Daigo Tanioka
(Malaysia) Tee Kai Wun (Malaysia) Yap Roy King	w	/	o

Final
(Malaysia) Man Wei Chong (Malaysia) Soh Wooi Yik	13	18
(Malaysia) Tee Kai Wun (Malaysia) Yap Roy King	21	21

=== Top half ===
==== Section 1 ====
First round
1	(China) Hu KY (China) Lin XY	21	21
(Vietnam) Nguyễn Đ H (Vietnam) Trần Đ M	9	15
Q1	(South Korea) Na S-s (South Korea) Wang C	16	5^{r}
(Japan) H Kawabe (Japan) K Matsukawa	21	13
6	(Japan) S Mezaki (Japan) Y Oku	21	21
(South Korea) Kang G-h (South Korea) Kim M-g	11	11
(United States) A Q Lee (United States) S Xing	14	19
Q4	(China) Lin YF (China) Yang JY	21	21

Second round
1	(China) Hu KY (China) Lin XY	15	21	19
(Japan) H Kawabe (Japan) K Matsukawa	21	17	21
6	(Japan) S Mezaki (Japan) Y Oku	27	21
Q4	(China) Lin YF (China) Yang JY	25	15

Quarter-finals
(Japan) H Kawabe (Japan) K Matsukawa	21	21
6	(Japan) S Mezaki (Japan) Y Oku	15	16

==== Section 2 ====
First round
4	(Thailand) C Charoenkitamorn (Thailand) W Thongsa-nga	16	18
(India) K P Garaga (India) P Roy	21	21
(Singapore) J Kubo (Singapore) H Wong	19	21	15
Q3	(South Korea) Kim Y-h (South Korea) Shin T-y	21	18	21
7	(England) O Butler (England) S Jones	19	21	19
(Singapore) Nge J J (Singapore) D Wee	21	14	21
(Japan) H Midorikawa (Japan) Y Nakashizu	21	17	11
(Malaysia) Man W C (Malaysia) Soh W Y	12	21	21

Second round
(India) K P Garaga (India) P Roy	21	21
Q3	(South Korea) Kim Y-h (South Korea) Shin T-y	18	19
(Singapore) Nge J J (Singapore) D Wee	18	14
(Malaysia) Man W C (Malaysia) Soh W Y	21	21

Quarter-finals
(India) K P Garaga (India) P Roy	7	8
(Malaysia) Man W C (Malaysia) Soh W Y	21	21

=== Bottom half ===
==== Section 3 ====
First round
Q2	(South Korea) Kim M-s (South Korea) Lee S-w	15	17
(Hong Kong) Hung K C (Hong Kong) Lui C W	21	21
(Japan) S Sawada (Japan) D Tanioka	18	21	21
8	(Chinese Taipei) Lai P-y (Chinese Taipei) Tsai F-c	21	9	18
(Malaysia) J Arif (Malaysia) Kang K X	16	21	20
(Malaysia) Low H Y (Malaysia) Ng E C	21	13	22
PFQ	(South Korea) Choi J-h (South Korea) Kim M-s	23	12	9
3	(Chinese Taipei) He Z-w (Chinese Taipei) Huang J-h	21	21	21

Second round
(Hong Kong) Hung K C (Hong Kong) Lui C W	22	18	6
(Japan) S Sawada (Japan) D Tanioka	20	21	21
(Malaysia) Low H Y (Malaysia) Ng E C	16	21	13
3	(Chinese Taipei) He Z-w (Chinese Taipei) Huang J-h	21	17	21

Quarter-finals
(Japan) S Sawada (Japan) D Tanioka	21	21
3	(Chinese Taipei) He Z-w (Chinese Taipei) Huang J-h	19	15

==== Section 4 ====
First round
(Singapore) T Hee (Singapore) W Koh	21	17	16
(Malaysia) Tee K W (Malaysia) Yap R K	18	21	21
(Chinese Taipei) Lin C-y (Chinese Taipei) Lin Y-s	11	16
SWM	(South Korea) Jin Y (South Korea) Lee J-m	21	21
(Malaysia) A Chia (Malaysia) A Tai	21	21
(India) B R Arigela (India) V T Gobburu	17	15
(India) A R Doddavarapu (India) A R Pochana	3	10
2	(South Korea) Choi S-g (Malaysia) Goh V S	21	21

Second round
(Malaysia) Tee K W (Malaysia) Yap R K	21	21
SWM	(South Korea) Jin Y (South Korea) Lee J-m	15	13
(Malaysia) A Chia (Malaysia) A Tai	21	21
2	(South Korea) Choi S-g (Malaysia) Goh V S	14	13

Quarter-finals
(Malaysia) Tee K W (Malaysia) Yap R K	21	21
(Malaysia) A Chia (Malaysia) A Tai	12	15

== Women's doubles ==
=== Seeds ===
1. (United States) Lauren Lam / Allison Lee (quarter-finals)
2. (Japan) Ririna Hiramoto / Kokona Ishikawa (second round)
3. (China) Luo Yi / Wang Tingge (champions)
4. (Thailand) Hathaithip Mijad / Napapakorn Tungkasatan (first round)
5. (China) Bao Lijing / Cao Zihan (second round)
6. (Thailand) Benyapa Aimsaard / Nuntakarn Aimsaard (final)
7. (Japan) Sumire Nakade / Miyu Takahashi (quarter-finals)
8. (Chinese Taipei) Lin Chih-chun / Yang Chu-yun (quarter-finals)

=== Finals ===
Semi-finals
(South Korea) Kim Yu-jung (South Korea) Lee Yu-lim	21	16	18
3	(China) Luo Yi (China) Wang Tingge	14	21	21
6	(Thailand) Benyapa Aimsaard (Thailand) Nuntakarn Aimsaard	21	21
Q3	(South Korea) Lee Seung-hee (South Korea) Park Min-ji	11	14

Final
3	(China) Luo Yi (China) Wang Tingge	17	21	21
6	(Thailand) Benyapa Aimsaard (Thailand) Nuntakarn Aimsaard	21	19	14

=== Top half ===
==== Section 1 ====
First round
1	(United States) L Lam (United States) A Lee	21	21
(Australia) L C Griselda (Australia) N Shimizu	8	18
Q2	(South Korea) Jo Y-n (South Korea) Kim Y-r	21	18	21
(Japan) M Hatasue (Japan) K Muroya	19	21	19
5	(China) Bao LJ (China) Cao ZH	21	21
(Malaysia) V Ng (Malaysia) Tan Z Y	12	16
(Japan) A Takata (Japan) M Yairo	11	10
(South Korea) Kim Y-j (South Korea) Lee Y-l	21	21

Second round
1	(United States) L Lam (United States) A Lee	23	21
Q2	(South Korea) Jo Y-n (South Korea) Kim Y-r	21	13
5	(China) Bao LJ (China) Cao ZH	21	18	8
(South Korea) Kim Y-j (South Korea) Lee Y-l	14	21	21

Quarter-finals
1	(United States) L Lam (United States) A Lee	19	8
(South Korea) Kim Y-j (South Korea) Lee Y-l	21	21

==== Section 2 ====
First round
3	(China) Luo Yi (China) Wang TG	21	21
(Japan) M Sugiyama (Japan) N Takahashi	11	15
(Japan) N Kamata (Japan) M Taguchi	21	21
(England) S Kelly (England) L Tolman	8	18
8	(Chinese Taipei) Lin C-c (Chinese Taipei) Yang C-y	21	21
(China) Wang YD (China) Wang ZM	18	15
(Malaysia) Cheng S H (Malaysia) Chong J Y	21	20	23
(Vietnam) Phạm T D L (Vietnam) Phạm T K	16	22	21

Second round
3	(China) Luo Yi (China) Wang TG	17	21	21
(Japan) N Kamata (Japan) M Taguchi	21	16	10
8	(Chinese Taipei) Lin C-c (Chinese Taipei) Yang C-y	21	21
(Malaysia) Cheng S H (Malaysia) Chong J Y	17	18

Quarter-finals
3	(China) Luo Yi (China) Wang TG	21	21
8	(Chinese Taipei) Lin C-c (Chinese Taipei) Yang C-y	18	14

=== Bottom half ===
==== Section 3 ====
First round
(South Korea) Lee S-j (South Korea) Lee Y-w	23	21
(South Korea) Kim B-r (South Korea) Yeon S-y	21	14
(South Korea) Ji Y-b (South Korea) Lee Y-n	17	18
6	(Thailand) B Aimsaard (Thailand) N Aimsaard	21	21
Q1	(South Korea) Moon I-s (South Korea) Park S	19	21	21
(Malaysia) Low Z Y (Malaysia) N Maisarah	21	18	17
(Japan) N Hara (Japan) R Kiyose	21	21
4	(Thailand) H Mijad (Thailand) N Tungkasatan	9	17

Second round
(South Korea) Lee S-j (South Korea) Lee Y-w	19	3^{r}
6	(Thailand) B Aimsaard (Thailand) N Aimsaard	21	4
Q1	(South Korea) Moon I-s (South Korea) Park S	16	17
(Japan) N Hara (Japan) R Kiyose	21	21

Quarter-finals
6	(Thailand) B Aimsaard (Thailand) N Aimsaard	19	21	21
(Japan) N Hara (Japan) R Kiyose	21	15	11

==== Section 4 ====
First round
(India) S Singh (India) R Thaker	13	21	21
Q4	(South Korea) Bang J-s (South Korea) Jang H-j	21	15	12
(Austria) Xu W (Australia) Y Zhang	13	8
7	(Japan) S Nakade (Japan) M Takahashi	21	21
(Canada) E Kwan (Canada) J Rymes	17	15
Q3	(South Korea) Lee S-h (South Korea) Park M-j	21	21
(India) P Konjengbam (India) S Mishra	15	13
2	(Japan) R Hiramoto (Japan) K Ishikawa	21	21

Second round
(India) S Singh (India) R Thaker	15	9
7	(Japan) S Nakade (Japan) M Takahashi	21	21
Q3	(South Korea) Lee S-h (South Korea) Park M-j	21	19	21
2	(Japan) R Hiramoto (Japan) K Ishikawa	13	21	16

Quarter-finals
7	(Japan) S Nakade (Japan) M Takahashi	15	22
Q3	(South Korea) Lee S-h (South Korea) Park M-j	21	24

== Mixed doubles ==
=== Seeds ===
1. (Japan) Yuta Watanabe / Maya Taguchi (champions)
2. (South Korea) Kim Jae-hyeon / Jang Ha-jeong (final)
3. (China) Gao Jiaxuan / Wu Mengying (semi-finals)
4. (Chinese Taipei) Wu Hsuan-yi / Yang Chu-yun (second round)
5. (Malaysia) Jimmy Wong / Cheng Su Yin (quarter-finals)
6. (India) Ishaan Bhatnagar / Shruti Mishra (second round)
7. (India) Dhruv Rawat / K. Maneesha (first round)
8. (South Korea) Cho Song-hyun / Jeong Na-eun (first round)

=== Finals ===
Semi-finals
1	(Japan) Yuta Watanabe (Japan) Maya Taguchi	21	17	21
3	(China) Gao Jiaxuan (China) Wu Mengying	14	21	10
(Japan) Haruki Kawabe (Japan) Kokona Ishikawa	21	15	13
2	(South Korea) Kim Jae-hyeon (South Korea) Jang Ha-jeong	14	21	21

Final
1	(Japan) Yuta Watanabe (Japan) Maya Taguchi	21	21
2	(South Korea) Kim Jae-hyeon (South Korea) Jang Ha-jeong	19	14

=== Top half ===
==== Section 1 ====
First round
1	(Japan) Y Watanabe (Japan) M Taguchi	21	21
(England) S Jones (England) L Tolman	12	17
(Japan) Y Oku (Japan) R Kiyose	14	16
Q1	(South Korea) Jin S-i (South Korea) Lee S-h	21	21
6	(India) I Bhatnagar (India) S Mishra	20	21	21
(India) S R Kanapuram (India) R Sharma	22	10	15
(South Korea) Shin T-y (South Korea) Kim Y-j	21	21
(South Korea) Kim M-s (South Korea) Lim M-j	7	16

Second round
1	(Japan) Y Watanabe (Japan) M Taguchi	21	19	21
Q1	(South Korea) Jin S-i (South Korea) Lee S-h	9	21	11
6	(India) I Bhatnagar (India) S Mishra	16	21	13
(South Korea) Shin T-y (South Korea) Kim Y-j	21	16	21

Quarter-finals
1	(Japan) Y Watanabe (Japan) M Taguchi	23	20	21
(South Korea) Shin T-y (South Korea) Kim Y-j	21	22	13

==== Section 2 ====
First round
3	(China) Gao JX (China) Wu MY	21	21
Q2	(South Korea) Park S-m (South Korea) Hong Y-b	11	13
(Germany) P Volkmann (Germany) F Volkmann	21	18	18
(Vietnam) Trần Đ M (Vietnam) Phạm T K	17	21	21
7	(India) D Rawat (India) K. Maneesha	21	14	17
(Malaysia) Loo B K (Malaysia) N Maisarah	18	21	21
(Australia) A Ramadiansyah (Australia) N Shimizu	21	15	21
Q3	(Japan) S Mezaki (Japan) N Hara	18	21	12

Second round
3	(China) Gao JX (China) Wu MY	21	21
(Vietnam) Trần Đ M (Vietnam) Phạm T K	9	9
(Malaysia) Loo B K (Malaysia) N Maisarah	21	22
(Australia) A Ramadiansyah (Australia) N Shimizu	15	20

Quarter-finals
3	(China) Gao JX (China) Wu MY	21	21
(Malaysia) Loo B K (Malaysia) N Maisarah	14	15

=== Bottom half ===
==== Section 3 ====
First round
(Japan) H Kawabe (Japan) K Ishikawa	21	21
(Germany) C Devereux (Germany) D Töpffer	5	5
(South Korea) Lee S-w (South Korea) Lee H-w	18	21	21
8	(South Korea) Cho S-h (South Korea) Jeong N-e	21	19	18
(Malaysia) Low H C (Malaysia) Chan W T	19	18
(Malaysia) Chen T J (Malaysia) C San	21	21
(Malaysia) Lim M H (United States) S Pan	10	5
4	(Chinese Taipei) Wu H-y (Chinese Taipei) Yang C-y	21	21

Second round
(Japan) H Kawabe (Japan) K Ishikawa	21	21
(South Korea) Lee S-w (South Korea) Lee H-w	14	17
(Malaysia) Chen T J (Malaysia) C San	21	13	21
4	(Chinese Taipei) Wu H-y (Chinese Taipei) Yang C-y	12	21	11

Quarter-finals
(Japan) H Kawabe (Japan) K Ishikawa	22	21
(Malaysia) Chen T J (Malaysia) C San	20	17

==== Section 4 ====
First round
Q4	(South Korea) Kim J-y (South Korea) Lee Y-l	21	21
(South Korea) Kang G-h (South Korea) Lim J-y	14	7
(Japan) K Matsukawa (Japan) S Nakade	21	15	10
5	(Malaysia) J Wong (Malaysia) Cheng S Y	14	21	21
(Canada) T Lock (Canada) C Hoang	21	21
(England) Wang YH (England) Lam C W	8	13
(Malaysia) Wee Y H (Malaysia) V Gobi	12	20
2	(South Korea) Kim J-h (South Korea) Jang H-j	21	22

Second round
Q4	(South Korea) Kim J-y (South Korea) Lee Y-l	21	15	23
5	(Malaysia) J Wong (Malaysia) Cheng S Y	13	21	25
(Canada) T Lock (Canada) C Hoang	24	19
2	(South Korea) Kim J-h (South Korea) Jang H-j	26	21

Quarter-finals
5	(Malaysia) J Wong (Malaysia) Cheng S Y	17	18
2	(South Korea) Kim J-h (South Korea) Jang H-j	21	21

Preceded by 2026 Taipei Open	BWF World Tour; 2026 BWF season	Succeeded by 2026 China Masters; 2026 Indonesia Masters Super 100 I
