= 2025 Korea Masters =

Badminton tournament in Korea

Tournament details
- Dates: 4–9 November
- Edition: 17th
- Level: Super 300
- Total prize money: US$240,000
- Venue: Wonkwang University Cultural and Sports Center
- Location: Iksan, South Korea

Champions
- Men's singles: (Singapore) Jason Teh
- Women's singles: (Chinese Taipei) Chiu Pin-chian
- Men's doubles: (South Korea) Lee Jong-min (South Korea) Wang Chan
- Women's doubles: (Japan) Hinata Suzuki (Japan) Nao Yamakita
- Mixed doubles: (South Korea) Kim Jae-hyeon (South Korea) Jeong Na-eun

The 2025 Korea Masters was a badminton tournament which took place at the Wonkwang University Cultural and Sports Center in Iksan, South Korea, from 4 to 9 November 2025 and had a total prize pool of $240,000.

== Tournament ==
The 2025 Korea Masters was the thirty-fourth tournament of the 2025 BWF World Tour and also part of the Korea Masters championships, which have been held since 2007. This tournament was organized by the Badminton Korea Association with sanction from the BWF.

=== Venue ===
This tournament was held at the Wonkwang University Cultural and Sports Center in Iksan, South Korea.

=== Point distribution ===
Below is the point distribution table for each phase of the tournament based on the BWF points system for the BWF World Tour Super 300 event.

Winner	Runner-up	3/4	5/8	9/16	17/32	33/64	65/128
7,000	5,950	4,900	3,850	2,750	1,670	660	320

=== Prize pool ===
The total prize money was US$240,000 with the distribution of the prize money in accordance with BWF regulations.

Event	Winner	Finalist	Semi-finals	Quarter-finals	Last 16
Singles	$18,000	$9,120	$3,480	$1,440	$840
Doubles	$18,960	$9,120	$3,360	$1,740	$900

== Men's singles ==
=== Seeds ===
1. (Singapore) Jason Teh (champion)
2. (Canada) Victor Lai (semi-finals)
3. (Canada) Brian Yang (second round)
4. (South Korea) Jeon Hyeok-jin (quarter-finals)
5. (Malaysia) Justin Hoh (first round)
6. (Chinese Taipei) Su Li-yang (quarter-finals)
7. (Indonesia) Chico Aura Dwi Wardoyo (first round)
8. (Malaysia) Aidil Sholeh (first round)

=== Finals ===
Semi-finals
1	(Singapore) Jason Teh	21	21
(Japan) Shogo Ogawa	12	18
PFQ	(Japan) Yudai Okimoto	21	21
2	(Canada) Victor Lai	16	17

Final
1	(Singapore) Jason Teh	21	21
PFQ	(Japan) Yudai Okimoto	14	15

=== Top half ===
==== Section 1 ====
First round
1	(Singapore) J Teh	21	21
PFQ	(South Korea) Kim B-j	17	15
Q3	(Indonesia) Y S Marcellyno	21	11	21
(Japan) R Takei	16	21	13
8	(Malaysia) Aidil S	13	10
Q4	(South Korea) Cho G-y	21	21
PFQ	(Chinese Taipei) Ting Y-c	14	21	21
(Malaysia) Cheam J W	21	11	18

Second round
1	(Singapore) J Teh	21	21
Q3	(Indonesia) Y S Marcellyno	19	12
Q4	(South Korea) Cho G-y	21	21
PFQ	(Chinese Taipei) Ting Y-c	16	10

Quarter-finals
1	(Singapore) J Teh	23	21
Q4	(South Korea) Cho G-y	21	17

==== Section 2 ====
First round
3	(Canada) B Yang	17	21	21
(Chinese Taipei) Huang Y-k	21	13	12
(Japan) S Ogawa	21	21
(Malaysia) Kok J H	11	19
7	(Indonesia) C A Dwi Wardoyo	21	20	9
(Sri Lanka) V Nettasinghe	14	22	21
(Indonesia) Z Ubaidillah	21	21
(Chinese Taipei) Huang P-h	11	16

Second round
3	(Canada) B Yang
(Japan) S Ogawa	w	/	o
(Sri Lanka) V Nettasinghe	16	21	14
(Indonesia) Z Ubaidillah	21	16	21

Quarter-finals
(Japan) S Ogawa	21	21
(Indonesia) Z Ubaidillah	19	18

=== Bottom half ===
==== Section 3 ====
First round
(Israel) M Zilberman	19	10
Q2	(South Korea) Cho H-w	21	21
PFQ	(Japan) Y Okimoto	21	21
5	(Malaysia) J Hoh	10	16
(Chinese Taipei) Kuo K-l	13	13
(Vietnam) Nguyễn H Đ	21	21
(Japan) K Takahashi	8	10
4	(South Korea) Jeon H-j	21	21

Second round
Q2	(South Korea) Cho H-w	20	21	8
PFQ	(Japan) Y Okimoto	22	16	21
(Vietnam) Nguyễn H Đ	16	25	2
4	(South Korea) Jeon H-j	21	23	21

Quarter-finals
PFQ	(Japan) Y Okimoto	21	21
4	(South Korea) Jeon H-j	13	13

==== Section 4 ====
First round
Q1	(South Korea) Park S-y	12	21	21
(Japan) T Obayashi	21	12	10
(Thailand) K Wangcharoen	9	9
6	(Chinese Taipei) Su L-y	21	21
(Chinese Taipei) Liao J-f	21	14	21
(Japan) R Hatano	17	21	17
(Kazakhstan) D Panarin	6	4
2	(Canada) V Lai	21	21

Second round
Q1	(South Korea) Park S-y	16	14
6	(Chinese Taipei) Su L-y	21	21
(Chinese Taipei) Liao J-f	19	7
2	(Canada) V Lai	21	21

Quarter-finals
6	(Chinese Taipei) Su L-y	21	10	20
2	(Canada) V Lai	13	21	22

== Women's singles ==
=== Seeds ===
1. (Chinese Taipei) Chiu Pin-chian (champion)
2. (Vietnam) Nguyễn Thùy Linh (final)
3. (Chinese Taipei) Sung Shuo-yun (first round)
4. (Japan) Nozomi Okuhara (second round)
5. (Japan) Manami Suizu (withdrew)
6. (Thailand) Pitchamon Opatniputh (quarter-finals)
7. (Chinese Taipei) Huang Yu-hsun (second round)
8. (Japan) Kaoru Sugiyama (first round)

=== Finals ===
Semi-finals
1	(Chinese Taipei) Chiu Pin-chian	19	21	21
(Indonesia) Ni Kadek Dhinda Amartya Pratiwi	21	19	8
(Japan) Hina Akechi	11	17
2	(Vietnam) Nguyễn Thùy Linh	21	21

Final
1	(Chinese Taipei) Chiu Pin-chian	21	21
2	(Vietnam) Nguyễn Thùy Linh	16	15

=== Top half ===
==== Section 1 ====
First round
1	(Chinese Taipei) Chiu P-c	21	21
(Malaysia) Goh J W	17	16
(Italy) Y Hamza	12	14
Q4	(Thailand) T Saeheng	21	21
8	(Japan) K Sugiyama	21	14	9
(Japan) A Takahashi	18	21	21
(Chinese Taipei) Liang T-y	w	/	o
(South Korea) Kim M-s

Second round
1	(Chinese Taipei) Chiu P-c	21	21
Q4	(Thailand) T Saeheng	13	16
(Japan) A Takahashi	21	21
(Chinese Taipei) Liang T-y	15	10

Quarter-finals
1	(Chinese Taipei) Chiu P-c	21	21
(Japan) A Takahashi	10	7

==== Section 2 ====
First round
3	(Chinese Taipei) Sung S-y	21	10	19
(Indonesia) N Pratiwi	17	21	21
PFQ	(Malaysia) S Zulaikha	13	21	17
(Chinese Taipei) Tung C-t	21	11	21
7	(Chinese Taipei) Huang Y-h	21	21
(Czech Republic) T Švábíková	11	19
(Chinese Taipei) Hsieh Y-e
(South Korea) Park G-e	w	/	o

Second round
(Indonesia) N Pratiwi	21	15	21
(Chinese Taipei) Tung C-t	16	21	12
7	(Chinese Taipei) Huang Y-h	13	11
(South Korea) Park G-e	21	21

Quarter-finals
(Indonesia) N Pratiwi	21	22	21
(South Korea) Park G-e	15	24	13

=== Bottom half ===
==== Section 3 ====
First round
Q2	(South Korea) Yoo A-y	27	21
(South Korea) Kim M-j	25	16
(Malaysia) Wong L C	19	13
6	(Thailand) P Opatniputh	21	21
(Japan) H Akechi	21	21
PFQ	(Singapore) M Lee	8	16
(Singapore) J Hooi	5	10
4	(Japan) N Okuhara	21	21

Second round
Q2	(South Korea) Yoo A-y	10	11
6	(Thailand) P Opatniputh	21	21
(Japan) H Akechi	21	21
4	(Japan) N Okuhara	12	12

Quarter-finals
6	(Thailand) P Opatniputh	18	21	15
(Japan) H Akechi	21	17	21

==== Section 4 ====
First round
(Chinese Taipei) Chen S-y	14	12
PFQ	(South Korea) Lee S-y	21	21
Q3	(Singapore) I Khan	16	21	11
PFQ	(South Korea) Kim J-e	21	18	21
(Chinese Taipei) Hung Y-t	21	17	21
(Azerbaijan) K F Azzahra	17	21	13
Q1	(Chinese Taipei) Han Y-c	9	15
2	(Vietnam) Nguyễn T L	21	21

Second round
PFQ	(South Korea) Lee S-y	15	21	21
PFQ	(South Korea) Kim J-e	21	11	17
(Chinese Taipei) Hung Y-t	18	9
2	(Vietnam) Nguyễn T L	21	21

Quarter-finals
PFQ	(South Korea) Lee S-y	12	21
2	(Vietnam) Nguyễn T L	21	23

== Men's doubles ==
=== Seeds ===
1. (Chinese Taipei) Lee Fang-chih / Lee Fang-jen (quarter-finals)
2. (South Korea) Kang Min-hyuk / Ki Dong-ju (quarter-finals)
3. (United States) Chen Zhi-yi / Presley Smith (semi-finals)
4. (Japan) Kakeru Kumagai / Hiroki Nishi (first round)
5. (South Korea) Jin Yong / Na Sung-seung (semi-finals)
6. (Indonesia) Raymond Indra / Nikolaus Joaquin (final)
7. (Chinese Taipei) He Zhi-wei / Huang Jui-hsuan (first round)
8. (Chinese Taipei) Chang Ko-chi / Po Li-wei (second round)

=== Finals ===
Semi-finals
5	(South Korea) Jin Yong (South Korea) Na Sung-seung	20	15
(South Korea) Lee Jong-min (South Korea) Wang Chan	22	21
3	(United States) Chen Zhi-yi (United States) Presley Smith	15	17
6	(Indonesia) Raymond Indra (Indonesia) Nikolaus Joaquin	21	21

Final
(South Korea) Lee Jong-min (South Korea) Wang Chan	16	21	21
6	(Indonesia) Raymond Indra (Indonesia) Nikolaus Joaquin	21	16	6

=== Top half ===
==== Section 1 ====
First round
1	(Chinese Taipei) Lee F-c (Chinese Taipei) Lee F-j	21	21
(South Korea) Choi S-g (Malaysia) Goh V S	12	19
(Canada) K M Deraj (Canada) V Ho	13	6
PFQ	(South Korea) Kang G-h (South Korea) Kim M-s	21	21
5	(South Korea) Jin Y (South Korea) Na S-s	21	21
(Japan) T Aizawa (Japan) D Sano	10	11
Q2	(South Korea) Han S-r (South Korea) Jang J-h	14	22
(Malaysia) Lau Y S (Malaysia) Lim T J	21	24

Second round
1	(Chinese Taipei) Lee F-c (Chinese Taipei) Lee F-j	19	21	21
PFQ	(South Korea) Kang G-h (South Korea) Kim M-s	21	12	19
5	(South Korea) Jin Y (South Korea) Na S-s	21	21
(Malaysia) Lau Y S (Malaysia) Lim T J	8	8

Quarter-finals
1	(Chinese Taipei) Lee F-c (Chinese Taipei) Lee F-j	6	15
5	(South Korea) Jin Y (South Korea) Na S-s	21	21

==== Section 2 ====
First round
4	(Japan) K Kumagai (Japan) H Nishi	27	19	18
(South Korea) Cho S-h (South Korea) Jin S-i	25	21	21
(Chinese Taipei) Su C-h (Chinese Taipei) Wu G-x	21	19	17
(Chinese Taipei) Lai P-y (Chinese Taipei) Tsai F-c	9	21	21
7	(Chinese Taipei) He Z-w (Chinese Taipei) Huang J-h	21	9	8
(South Korea) Lee J-m (South Korea) Wang C	16	21	21
(Malaysia) Low H Y (Malaysia) Ng E C	14	21	19
Q4	(South Korea) Choi M-g (South Korea) Lee H-s	21	18	21

Second round
(South Korea) Cho S-h (South Korea) Jin S-i	21	21
(Chinese Taipei) Lai P-y (Chinese Taipei) Tsai F-c	19	17
(South Korea) Lee J-m (South Korea) Wang C	21	21
Q4	(South Korea) Choi M-g (South Korea) Lee H-s	11	16

Quarter-finals
(South Korea) Cho S-h (South Korea) Jin S-i	21	13	17
(South Korea) Lee J-m (South Korea) Wang C	16	21	21

=== Bottom half ===
==== Section 3 ====
First round
(South Korea) An Y-s (South Korea) Park K-h	16	13
(Malaysia) Chia W J (Malaysia) Lwi S H	21	21
(Chinese Taipei) Chiu T-h (Chinese Taipei) Lu C-y	21	16	18
8	(Chinese Taipei) Chang K-c (Chinese Taipei) Po L-w	19	21	21
Q3	(South Korea) Kim D-h (South Korea) Kwak H-c	12	15
(South Korea) Park B-s (South Korea) Shin T-y	21	21
Q1	(South Korea) Lim H-b (South Korea) Yoo J-s	14	19
3	(United States) Chen Z-y (United States) P Smith	21	21

Second round
(Malaysia) Chia W J (Malaysia) Lwi S H	21	21
8	(Chinese Taipei) Chang K-c (Chinese Taipei) Po L-w	17	17
(South Korea) Park B-s (South Korea) Shin T-y	12	12
3	(United States) Chen Z-y (United States) P Smith	21	21

Quarter-finals
(Malaysia) Chia W J (Malaysia) Lwi S H	15	15
3	(United States) Chen Z-y (United States) P Smith	21	21

==== Section 4 ====
First round
(Indonesia) P Erwiansyah (Indonesia) D E Marvino	21	21
(Canada) J Lai (Canada) N Yakura	17	18
(Czech Republic) J Král (Czech Republic) O Král	12	22	18
6	(Indonesia) R Indra (Indonesia) N Joaquin	21	20	21
(South Korea) Noh J-s (South Korea) Park S-m	21	15	21
(Vietnam) Nguyễn Đ H (Vietnam) Trần Đ M	12	21	19
(Chinese Taipei) Wei C-w (Chinese Taipei) Yang P-c	15	10
2	(South Korea) Kang M-h (South Korea) Ki D-j	21	21

Second round
(Indonesia) P Erwiansyah (Indonesia) D E Marvino	17	16
6	(Indonesia) R Indra (Indonesia) N Joaquin	21	21
(South Korea) Noh J-s (South Korea) Park S-m	14	13
2	(South Korea) Kang M-h (South Korea) Ki D-j	21	21

Quarter-finals
6	(Indonesia) R Indra (Indonesia) N Joaquin	21	21
2	(South Korea) Kang M-h (South Korea) Ki D-j	14	11

== Women's doubles ==
=== Seeds ===
1. (South Korea) Jeong Na-eun / Lee Yeon-woo (semi-finals)
2. (Chinese Taipei) Hsu Ya-ching / Sung Yu-hsuan (semi-finals)
3. (Chinese Taipei) Sung Shuo-yun / Yu Chien-hui (quarter-finals)
4. (Chinese Taipei) Lin Xiao-min / Wang Yu-qiao (quarter-finals)
5. (United States) Allison Lee / (South Korea) Lee Yu-lim (first round)
6. (Japan) Hinata Suzuki / Nao Yamakita (champions)
7. (Indonesia) Isyana Syahira Meida / Rinjani Kwinnara Nastine (first round)
8. (United States) Francesca Corbett / Jennie Gai (quarter-finals)

=== Finals ===
Semi-finals
1	(South Korea) Jeong Na-eun (South Korea) Lee Yeon-woo	21	16	18
6	(Japan) Hinata Suzuki (Japan) Nao Yamakita	14	21	21
(South Korea) Kim So-yeong (South Korea) Lee Seo-jin	21	21
2	(Chinese Taipei) Hsu Ya-ching (Chinese Taipei) Sung Yu-hsuan	16	17

Final
6	(Japan) Hinata Suzuki (Japan) Nao Yamakita	21	25
(South Korea) Kim So-yeong (South Korea) Lee Seo-jin	18	23

=== Top half ===
==== Section 1 ====
First round
(South Korea) Jang E-s (South Korea) Kim Y-j
(Malaysia) Chong J Y (Malaysia) V Ng	w	/	o
5	(United States) A Lee (South Korea) Lee Y-l	12	21	15
(Thailand) B Aimsaard (Thailand) S S Wedler	21	14	21
(Japan) M Kurashima (Japan) H Osawa	11	14
(South Korea) Park S (South Korea) Yeon S-y	21	21

Second round
1	(South Korea) Jeong N-e (South Korea) Lee Y-w	21	21
(Malaysia) Chong J Y (Malaysia) V Ng	18	5
(Thailand) B Aimsaard (Thailand) S S Wedler	21	21
(South Korea) Park S (South Korea) Yeon S-y	16	19

Quarter-finals
1	(South Korea) Jeong N-e (South Korea) Lee Y-w	21	21
(Thailand) B Aimsaard (Thailand) S S Wedler	14	9

==== Section 2 ====
First round
(Malaysia) Cheng S H (Malaysia) Tan Z Y	21	21
(South Korea) Kim Y-j (South Korea) Lee C-e	12	19
6	(Japan) H Suzuki (Japan) N Yamakita	21	21
(South Korea) Boo S-y (South Korea) Yoo D-e	11	10
(South Korea) Cho H-r (South Korea) Lee D-h	21	14	21
(South Korea) Kim Y-r (South Korea) Lee H-w	14	21	11

Second round
3	(Chinese Taipei) Sung S-y (Chinese Taipei) Yu C-h	21	21
(Malaysia) Cheng S H (Malaysia) Tan Z Y	17	11
6	(Japan) H Suzuki (Japan) N Yamakita	21	21
(South Korea) Cho H-r (South Korea) Lee D-h	17	9

Quarter-finals
3	(Chinese Taipei) Sung S-y (Chinese Taipei) Yu C-h	20	19
6	(Japan) H Suzuki (Japan) N Yamakita	22	21

=== Bottom half ===
==== Section 3 ====
First round
(South Korea) Kim A-l (South Korea) Oh Y-j	12	5
(Japan) N Hara (Japan) R Kiyose	21	21
(South Korea) Kim S-y (South Korea) Lee S-j	21	21
7	(Indonesia) I S Meida (Indonesia) R K Nastine	11	18
(Chinese Taipei) Chen S-y (Chinese Taipei) Hsieh Y-e	4	7
(Japan) R Hiramoto (Japan) K Ishikawa	21	21
(Indonesia) V Christina (Indonesia) A S Rahayu	16	13
4	(Chinese Taipei) Lin X-m (Chinese Taipei) Wang Y-q	21	21

Second round
(Japan) N Hara (Japan) R Kiyose	21	16	15
(South Korea) Kim S-y (South Korea) Lee S-j	13	21	21
(Japan) R Hiramoto (Japan) K Ishikawa	19	12
4	(Chinese Taipei) Lin X-m (Chinese Taipei) Wang Y-q	21	21

Quarter-finals
(South Korea) Kim S-y (South Korea) Lee S-j	21	21
4	(Chinese Taipei) Lin X-m (Chinese Taipei) Wang Y-q	17	15

==== Section 4 ====
First round
(Chinese Taipei) Lin C-c (Chinese Taipei) Lin W-c	17	21	21
(Indonesia) S S Azzahra (Indonesia) A Z D Ramadhani	21	19	18
(Chinese Taipei) Huang Z-l (Chinese Taipei) Wang S-m	9	14
8	(United States) F Corbett (United States) J Gai	21	21
(Canada) C Choi (Canada) C Lai	19	21	13
(Chinese Taipei) Chen Y-f (Chinese Taipei) Sun L-c	21	16	21

Second round
(Chinese Taipei) Lin C-c (Chinese Taipei) Lin W-c	13	17
8	(United States) F Corbett (United States) J Gai	21	21
(Chinese Taipei) Chen Y-f (Chinese Taipei) Sun L-c	22	11	19
2	(Chinese Taipei) Hsu Y-c (Chinese Taipei) Sung Y-h	20	21	21

Quarter-finals
8	(United States) F Corbett (United States) J Gai	15	21	18
2	(Chinese Taipei) Hsu Y-c (Chinese Taipei) Sung Y-h	21	11	21

== Mixed doubles ==
=== Seeds ===
1. (United States) Presley Smith / Jennie Gai (first round)
2. (Indonesia) Marwan Faza / Aisyah Pranata (first round)
3. (Malaysia) Jimmy Wong / Lai Pei Jing (final)
4. (Chinese Taipei) Wu Guan-xun / Lee Chia-hsin (quarter-finals)
5. (United States) Chen Zhi-yi / Francesca Corbett (first round)
6. (Japan) Akira Koga / Hina Osawa (quarter-finals)
7. (Canada) Jonathan Lai / Crystal Lai (quarter-finals)
8. (South Korea) Kim Jae-hyeon / Jeong Na-eun (champions)

=== Finals ===
Semi-finals
(South Korea) An Yun-seong (South Korea) Lee Yu-lim	14	21	15
3	(Malaysia) Jimmy Wong (Malaysia) Lai Pei Jing	21	19	21
8	(South Korea) Kim Jae-hyeon (South Korea) Jeong Na-eun	21	21
(South Korea) Wang Chan (South Korea) Kim Yu-jung	19	10

Final
3	(Malaysia) Jimmy Wong (Malaysia) Lai Pei Jing	22	18
8	(South Korea) Kim Jae-hyeon (South Korea) Jeong Na-eun	24	21

=== Top half ===
==== Section 1 ====
First round
1	(United States) P Smith (United States) J Gai	21	19	12
(Japan) D Sano (Japan) M Kurashima	18	21	21
(Malaysia) Wee Y H (Malaysia) V Gobi	13	5
(South Korea) An Y-s (South Korea) Lee Y-l	21	21
6	(Japan) A Koga (Japan) H Osawa	22	21
PFQ	(Chinese Taipei) Chiu T-h (Chinese Taipei) Lin C-c	20	13
(South Korea) Kang G-h (South Korea) Lee H-w	21	21
(Malaysia) Low H C (Malaysia) Chan W T	12	14

Second round
(Japan) D Sano (Japan) M Kurashima	16	11
(South Korea) An Y-s (South Korea) Lee Y-l	21	21
6	(Japan) A Koga (Japan) H Osawa	21	21
(South Korea) Kang G-h (South Korea) Lee H-w	17	13

Quarter-finals
(South Korea) An Y-s (South Korea) Lee Y-l	21	23	21
6	(Japan) A Koga (Japan) H Osawa	16	25	18

==== Section 2 ====
First round
3	(Malaysia) J Wong (Malaysia) Lai P J	21	21
(Germany) C Devereux (Germany) D Toepffer	3	2
PFQ	(Chinese Taipei) Huang J-h (Chinese Taipei) Chen Y-f	20	21	21
Q1	(South Korea) Choi J-h (South Korea) Kim A-l	22	15	9
5	(United States) Chen Z-y (United States) F Corbett	13	20
(Malaysia) Loo B K (Malaysia) N Maisarah	21	22
(Canada) N Yakura (Canada) C Choi	16	16
(Thailand) P Horbanluekit (Thailand) B Aimsaard	21	21

Second round
3	(Malaysia) J Wong (Malaysia) Lai P J	21	21
PFQ	(Chinese Taipei) Huang J-h (Chinese Taipei) Chen Y-f	10	10
(Malaysia) Loo B K (Malaysia) N Maisarah	21	16	11
(Thailand) P Horbanluekit (Thailand) B Aimsaard	17	21	21

Quarter-finals
3	(Malaysia) J Wong (Malaysia) Lai P J	21	21
(Thailand) P Horbanluekit (Thailand) B Aimsaard	10	12

=== Bottom half ===
==== Section 3 ====
First round
(Chinese Taipei) He Z-w (Chinese Taipei) Sun L-c	21	21
Q2	(South Korea) Kim M-g (South Korea) Cho H-r	13	16
(South Korea) Park B-s (South Korea) Park S	22	14
8	(South Korea) Kim J-h (South Korea) Jeong N-e	24	21
(England) Wang Y H (Australia) Y Zhang	19	15
Q3	(South Korea) Kim M-s (South Korea) Oh Y-j	21	21
(Israel) M Zilberman (Israel) S Zilberman	8	6
4	(Chinese Taipei) Wu G-x (Chinese Taipei) Lee C-h	21	21

Second round
(Chinese Taipei) He Z-w (Chinese Taipei) Sun L-c	20	9
8	(South Korea) Kim J-h (South Korea) Jeong N-e	22	21
Q3	(South Korea) Kim M-s (South Korea) Oh Y-j	9	17
4	(Chinese Taipei) Wu G-x (Chinese Taipei) Lee C-h	21	21

Quarter-finals
8	(South Korea) Kim J-h (South Korea) Jeong N-e	18	21	24
4	(Chinese Taipei) Wu G-x (Chinese Taipei) Lee C-h	21	10	22

==== Section 4 ====
First round
(Thailand) Tonk Saeheng (Thailand) Tonr Saeheng	9	10
(Chinese Taipei) Yang P-c (Chinese Taipei) Lin W-c	21	21
(Japan) T Aizawa (Japan) M Aoki
7	(Canada) J Lai (Canada) C Lai	w	/	o
Q4	(South Korea) Kwak H-c (South Korea) Boo S-y	15	13
(Czech Republic) O Král (Czech Republic) T Švábíková	21	21
(South Korea) Wang C (South Korea) Kim Y-j	21	18	21
2	(Indonesia) M Faza (Indonesia) A Pranata	17	21	13

Second round
(Chinese Taipei) Yang P-c (Chinese Taipei) Lin W-c	20	21	13
7	(Canada) J Lai (Canada) C Lai	22	19	21
(Czech Republic) O Král (Czech Republic) T Švábíková	13	14
(South Korea) Wang C (South Korea) Kim Y-j	21	21

Quarter-finals
7	(Canada) J Lai (Canada) C Lai	9	20
(South Korea) Wang C (South Korea) Kim Y-j	21	22

Preceded by 2025 Hylo Open	BWF World Tour; 2025 BWF season	Succeeded by 2025 Japan Masters
