= Badminton at the 2025 SEA Games =

Events at 2025 SEA Games

- Venue: Gymnasium 4, Thammasat University Rangsit Campus
- Location: Pathum Thani, Thailand
- Dates: 7–14 December 2025

The badminton competition at the 2025 SEA Games took place at Gymnasium 4, Thammasat University Rangsit Campus, Pathum Thani, Thailand from 7 to 14 December 2025. The game featured 7 events, two singles, three double and two team events.

== Medal table ==
* Host nation (Thailand)

Rank	Nation	Gold	Silver	Bronze	Total
1	Indonesia	3	3	4	10
2	Thailand*	3	2	1	6
3	Malaysia	1	2	6	9
4	Singapore	0	0	2	2
5	Vietnam	0	0	1	1
Totals (5 entries)		7	7	14	28

== Medalists ==
Event	Gold	Silver	Bronze
Men's singles	Alwi Farhan; Indonesia	Zaki Ubaidillah; Indonesia	Leong Jun Hao; Malaysia
Men's singles	Alwi Farhan; Indonesia	Zaki Ubaidillah; Indonesia	Justin Hoh; Malaysia
Women's singles	Ratchanok Intanon; Thailand	Supanida Katethong; Thailand	Putri Kusuma Wardani; Indonesia
Women's singles	Ratchanok Intanon; Thailand	Supanida Katethong; Thailand	Wong Ling Ching; Malaysia
Men's doubles	Indonesia; Sabar Karyaman Gutama; Muhammad Reza Pahlevi Isfahani	Malaysia; Aaron Chia; Soh Wooi Yik	Indonesia; Leo Rolly Carnando; Bagas Maulana
Men's doubles	Indonesia; Sabar Karyaman Gutama; Muhammad Reza Pahlevi Isfahani	Malaysia; Aaron Chia; Soh Wooi Yik	Malaysia; Man Wei Chong; Tee Kai Wun
Women's doubles	Malaysia; Pearly Tan; Thinaah Muralitharan	Indonesia; Febriana Dwipuji Kusuma; Meilysa Trias Puspita Sari	Indonesia; Rachel Allessya Rose; Febi Setianingrum
Women's doubles	Malaysia; Pearly Tan; Thinaah Muralitharan	Indonesia; Febriana Dwipuji Kusuma; Meilysa Trias Puspita Sari	Vietnam; Bùi Bích Phương; Vũ Thị Trang
Mixed doubles	Thailand; Ruttanapak Oupthong; Jhenicha Sudjaipraparat	Thailand; Dechapol Puavaranukroh; Supissara Paewsampran	Malaysia; Chen Tang Jie; Toh Ee Wei
Mixed doubles	Thailand; Ruttanapak Oupthong; Jhenicha Sudjaipraparat	Thailand; Dechapol Puavaranukroh; Supissara Paewsampran	Indonesia; Jafar Hidayatullah; Felisha Pasaribu
Men's team	Indonesia; Leo Rolly Carnando; Alwi Farhan; Sabar Karyaman Gutama; Jafar Hidayatullah; Muhammad Reza Pahlevi Isfahani; Yohanes Saut Marcellyno; Bagas Maulana; Prahdiska Bagas Shujiwo; Amri Syahnawi; Zaki Ubaidillah	Malaysia; Aidil Sholeh; Chen Tang Jie; Aaron Chia; Leong Jun Hao; Eogene Ewe; Justin Hoh; Hoo Pang Ron; Man Wei Chong; Soh Wooi Yik; Tee Kai Wun	Singapore; Kriston Choo; Ding Hanjin; Terry Hee; Joel Koh; Wesley Koh; Junsuke Kubo; Loh Kean Yew; Jason Teh; Donovan Wee; Howin Wong
Men's team	Indonesia; Leo Rolly Carnando; Alwi Farhan; Sabar Karyaman Gutama; Jafar Hidayatullah; Muhammad Reza Pahlevi Isfahani; Yohanes Saut Marcellyno; Bagas Maulana; Prahdiska Bagas Shujiwo; Amri Syahnawi; Zaki Ubaidillah	Malaysia; Aidil Sholeh; Chen Tang Jie; Aaron Chia; Leong Jun Hao; Eogene Ewe; Justin Hoh; Hoo Pang Ron; Man Wei Chong; Soh Wooi Yik; Tee Kai Wun	Thailand; Supak Jomkoh; Kittinupong Kedren; Ruttanapak Oupthong; Dechapol Puavaranukroh; Peeratchai Sukphun; Pakkapon Teeraratsakul; Panitchaphon Teeraratsakul; Kunlavut Vitidsarn; Kantaphon Wangcharoen; Wongsup Wongsup-in
Women's team	Thailand; Benyapa Aimsaard; Pornpawee Chochuwong; Ratchanok Intanon; Ornnicha Jongsathapornparn; Supanida Katethong; Busanan Ongbamrungphan; Supissara Paewsampran; Jhenicha Sudjaipraparat; Sukitta Suwachai; Sapsiree Taerattanachai	Indonesia; Febriana Dwipuji Kusuma; Nita Violina Marwah; Felisha Pasaribu; Ni Kadek Dhinda Amartya Pratiwi; Meilysa Trias Puspita Sari; Mutiara Ayu Puspitasari; Rachel Allessya Rose; Febi Setianingrum; Gregoria Mariska Tunjung; Putri Kusuma Wardani	Singapore; Heng Xiao En; Jaslyn Hooi; Insyirah Khan; Jin Yujia; Megan Lee Xin Yi; Li Zheng Hong; Li Zheng Yan; Andrea Jacqui Tay; Yeo Jia Min
Women's team	Thailand; Benyapa Aimsaard; Pornpawee Chochuwong; Ratchanok Intanon; Ornnicha Jongsathapornparn; Supanida Katethong; Busanan Ongbamrungphan; Supissara Paewsampran; Jhenicha Sudjaipraparat; Sukitta Suwachai; Sapsiree Taerattanachai	Indonesia; Febriana Dwipuji Kusuma; Nita Violina Marwah; Felisha Pasaribu; Ni Kadek Dhinda Amartya Pratiwi; Meilysa Trias Puspita Sari; Mutiara Ayu Puspitasari; Rachel Allessya Rose; Febi Setianingrum; Gregoria Mariska Tunjung; Putri Kusuma Wardani	Malaysia; Cheng Su Yin; Eng Ler Qi; Go Pei Kee; Letshanaa Karupathevan; Pearly Tan; Teoh Mei Xing; Thinaah Muralitharan; Toh Ee Wei; Wong Ling Ching; Siti Zulaikha
