= Man Wei Chong =

Malaysian badminton player (born 1999)

Man Wei Chong 万炜聪
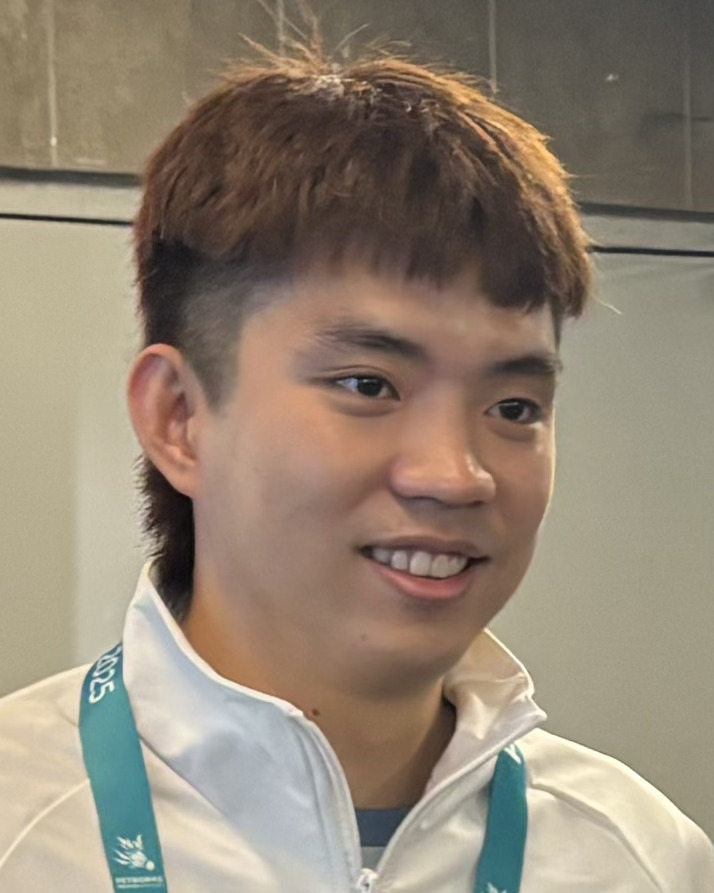
- Man at the 2025 Petronas Malaysia Open

Personal information
- Born: 5 September 1999 (age 27) Malacca, Malaysia
- Height: 1.82 m (6 ft 0 in)

Sport
- Country: Malaysia
- Sport: Badminton
- Handedness: Right
- Coached by: Herry Iman Pierngadi

Men's & mixed doubles
- Highest ranking: 4 (MD with Tee Kai Wun, 16 December 2025); 74 (XD with Pearly Tan, 17 March 2020)
- Current ranking: 9 (MD with Tee Kai Wun, 10 November 2026)
- BWF profile
Medal record
Men's badminton
Representing Malaysia
Sudirman Cup
Bronze medal – third place	2021 Vantaa	Mixed team
Asia Team Championships
Gold medal – first place	2022 Selangor	Men's team
SEA Games
Silver medal – second place	2021 Vietnam	Men's team
Silver medal – second place	2025 Thailand	Men's team
Bronze medal – third place	2025 Thailand	Men's doubles
World Junior Championships
Silver medal – second place	2016 Bilbao	Mixed team
Silver medal – second place	2017 Yogyakarta	Mixed team

Man Wei Chong
- Simplified Chinese: 万炜聪
- Traditional Chinese: 萬煒聰
Transcriptions
Standard Mandarin
- Hanyu Pinyin: Wàn Wěicōng
Hakka
- Pha̍k-fa-sṳ: Man Vúi-tshûng / Van Vui-tshûng
Yue: Cantonese
- Jyutping: Maan6 Wai5 Cung1
Southern Min
- Hokkien POJ: Bān Úi-chhong

Man Wei Chong (simplified Chinese: 万炜聪; traditional Chinese: 萬煒聰; pinyin: Wàn Wěicōng, born 5 September 1999) is a Malaysian badminton player. A multiple BWF World Tour tournament champion, he and his longtime partner Tee Kai Wun won the men's doubles titles at the 2025 Indonesia Masters and 2025 Malaysia Masters, both BWF World Tour Super 500 tournaments. They also reached the final of the 2024 Indonesia Open, a Super 1000 tournament, and achieved their highest world ranking of number four on 16 December 2025. Their victory at the 2025 Malaysia Masters ended Malaysia's 12-year wait for a men's doubles title at the tournament, following the triumph of Goh V Shem and Lim Khim Wah in 2013.

Together with Tee, Man also won the 2022 Syed Modi International and back-to-back Taipei Open titles in 2022 and 2023. Following changes to Malaysia's national men's doubles partnerships in 2026, he partnered Soh Wooi Yik to reach the final of the 2026 Korea Masters, where they finished runners-up to Tee and Yap Roy King.

Man was also part of the Malaysian men's team that won gold at the 2022 Badminton Asia Team Championships and the mixed team that won bronze at the 2021 Sudirman Cup. He won silver medals in the men's team events at the 2021 and 2025 SEA Games, as well as a men's doubles bronze medal at the 2025 SEA Games alongside Tee. During his junior career, he contributed to Malaysia's mixed team silver medals at the 2016 and 2017 World Junior Championships.

== Career ==
=== 2016–2017: Junior career ===
In September 2016, he won the Malaysia Junior International title with partner Chen Tang Jie. He also won two consecutive silver medals in mixed team event at the 2016 and 2017 BWF World Junior Championships. In October 2017, he was invited by Badminton Association of Malaysia to join the national team.

=== 2018–2019 ===
In August 2018, Man and Chen competed at the 2018 Spain Masters but their run were stopped in the semi-finals by the eventual champions, Kim Gi-jung and Lee Yong-dae. In 2019, he played mixed doubles partnered with Pearly Tan. Together, they finished as runners-up at the Malaysia International Challenge in November. They also reached the semi-finals of Vietnam International in April and Malaysia International Series in June.

=== 2021 ===
After more than a year not competing due to pandemic, Man made a return to international badminton at the Polish Open in March. He and partner Tee Kai Wun won the title after defeating compatriots Chang Yee Jun and Chia Wei Jie in the final. In June, Man and Tee clinched their second title at the Spanish International. He was then selected to represent Malaysia at the 2021 Sudirman Cup and 2020 Thomas & Uber Cup. In October, Man and Tee finished as runners-up to Terry Hee and Loh Kean Hean at the Czech Open. In November, the pair won their third title of the year at the Irish Open. In December, they end the season with a runner-up finish at the Welsh International.

=== 2022 ===
In January, Man and Tee claimed their first BWF World Tour title by winning the 2022 Syed Modi International. He was part of Malaysia's men's team that won gold at the 2022 Badminton Asia Team Championships in February. In May, he made his debut at the 2021 SEA Games where he helped Malaysia win the silver medal in the men's team event. In July, Man and Tee captured the 2022 Taipei Open title beating reigning Olympic champion Lee Yang and Wang Chi-lin in three games.

=== 2023 ===
In May, Man and Tee entered their first final of the year at home event 2023 Malaysia Masters, but lost out to Korea's Kang Min-hyuk and Seo Seung-jae. In June, they successfully defended their title at the 2023 Taipei Open after defeating home pair Lu Ching-yao and Yang Po-han. In August, the pair made their debut at the 2023 BWF World Championships but fell in the third round to Liang Weikeng and Wang Chang in three games. In October, they made it to the 2023 Arctic Open final and finished as runners-up to Denmark's Kim Astrup and Anders Skaarup Rasmussen.

=== 2024 ===
In June, contesting their first BWF World Tour Super 1000 final at the 2024 Indonesia Open, Man and Tee went down to Liang and Wang, finishing second.

=== 2025 ===
At the beginning of the new season in January, Man and Tee went to the semi-finals in their home ground Malaysia Open before they lost against Chen Boyang and Liu Yi in 3 sets. Their luck changes in the next two tournaments when they redeem their lost in Indonesia the previous year by winning Indonesia Masters against the home favourite, Fajar Alfian and Muhammad Rian Ardianto in straight sets. Man and Tee ended a 12 years droughts for home title in Malaysia Masters after prevailed in All-Malaysian finals against Aaron Chia and Soh Wooi Yik. In December, he competed in the SEA Games in Thailand. He won the silver medal in the team event, and a bronze in the men's doubles.

=== 2026 ===
Man and Tee did not started the year with good performance as they only managed to reach several quarter-finals berth including at the Malaysia Open, India Open and All England Open. In August, BAM shuffled up the existing pair to seek for the best pairings where in the Korea Masters, he would play alongside Soh Wooi Yik. This pairing gave a positive result when they managed to reach the final of that tournament, where they lost against another shuffle pair consisting of his old partner, Tee Kai Wun and Yap Roy King. Man reunited with Tee in October in which they sealed their first title of the year as a pair in all-Malaysian finals in French Open as they won against Goh Sze Fei and Nur Izzuddin in 44 minutes. In November, Man and Tee added their title as they ended the 27 year drought by winning the Hong Kong Open against the reigning Asian Games gold medalists, Leo Rolly Carnando and Daniel Marthin of Indonesia in 39 minutes.

== Achievements ==
=== SEA Games ===
Men's doubles
Year	Venue	Partner	Opponent	Score	Result	Ref.
2025	Gymnasium 4, Thammasat University Rangsit Campus; Pathum Thani, Thailand	(Malaysia) Tee Kai Wun	(Indonesia) Sabar Karyaman Gutama (Indonesia) Muhammad Reza Pahlevi Isfahani	16–21, 17–21	Bronze	

=== BWF World Tour (7 titles, 4 runners-up) ===
The BWF World Tour, which was announced on 19 March 2017 and implemented in 2018, is a series of elite badminton tournaments sanctioned by the Badminton World Federation (BWF). The BWF World Tour is divided into levels of World Tour Finals, Super 1000, Super 750, Super 500, Super 300 (part of the HSBC World Tour), and the BWF Tour Super 100.

Men's doubles
Year	Tournament	Level	Partner	Opponent	Score	Result	Ref.
2022	Syed Modi International	Super 300	(Malaysia) Tee Kai Wun	(India) Krishna Prasad Garaga (India) Vishnuvardhan Goud Panjala	21–18, 21–15	(gold) Winner	
2022	Taipei Open	Super 300	(Malaysia) Tee Kai Wun	(Chinese Taipei) Lee Yang (Chinese Taipei) Wang Chi-lin	21–18, 11–21, 21–18	(gold) Winner	
2023	Malaysia Masters	Super 500	(Malaysia) Tee Kai Wun	(South Korea) Kang Min-hyuk (South Korea) Seo Seung-jae	15–21, 24–22, 19–21	(silver) Runner-up	
2023	Taipei Open	Super 300	(Malaysia) Tee Kai Wun	(Chinese Taipei) Lu Ching-yao (Chinese Taipei) Yang Po-han	20–22, 21–17, 21–14	(gold) Winner	
2023	Arctic Open	Super 500	(Malaysia) Tee Kai Wun	(Denmark) Kim Astrup (Denmark) Anders Skaarup Rasmussen	18–21, 17–21	(silver) Runner-up	
2024	Indonesia Open	Super 1000	(Malaysia) Tee Kai Wun	(China) Liang Weikeng (China) Wang Chang	21–19, 16–21, 12–21	(silver) Runner-up	
2025	Indonesia Masters	Super 500	(Malaysia) Tee Kai Wun	(Indonesia) Fajar Alfian (Indonesia) Muhammad Rian Ardianto	21–11, 21–19	(gold) Winner	
2025	Malaysia Masters	Super 500	(Malaysia) Tee Kai Wun	(Malaysia) Aaron Chia (Malaysia) Soh Wooi Yik	21–12, 15–21, 21–16	(gold) Winner	
2026	Korea Masters	Super 300	(Malaysia) Soh Wooi Yik	(Malaysia) Tee Kai Wun (Malaysia) Yap Roy King	13–21, 18–21	(silver) Runner-up	
2026	French Open	Super 750	(Malaysia) Tee Kai Wun	(Malaysia) Goh Sze Fei (Malaysia) Nur Izzuddin	13–21, 21–15, 21–7	(gold) Winner	
2026	Hong Kong Open	Super 500	(Malaysia) Tee Kai Wun	(Indonesia) Leo Rolly Carnando (Indonesia) Daniel Marthin	21–19, 21–18	(gold) Winner	

=== BWF International Challenge/Series (3 titles, 3 runners-up) ===
Men's doubles
Year	Tournament	Partner	Opponent	Score	Result
2021	Polish Open	(Malaysia) Tee Kai Wun	(Malaysia) Chang Yee Jun (Malaysia) Chia Wei Jie	21–17, 20–22, 21–19	(gold) Winner
2021	Spanish International	(Malaysia) Tee Kai Wun	(France) Lucas Corvée (France) Ronan Labar	21–15, 21–18	(gold) Winner
2021	Czech Open	(Malaysia) Tee Kai Wun	(Singapore) Terry Hee (Singapore) Loh Kean Hean	21–13, 15–21, 15–21	(silver) Runner-up
2021	Irish Open	(Malaysia) Tee Kai Wun	(England) Rory Easton (England) Zach Russ	21–7, 21–17	(gold) Winner
2021	Welsh International	(Malaysia) Tee Kai Wun	(South Korea) Kim Gi-jung (South Korea) Kim Sa-rang	18–21, 21–18, 15–21	(silver) Runner-up

Mixed doubles
Year	Tournament	Partner	Opponent	Score	Result
2019	Malaysia International	(Malaysia) Pearly Tan	(China) Dong Weijie (China) Chen Xiaofei	16–21, 19–21	(silver) Runner-up

BWF International Challenge tournament
BWF International Series tournament
BWF Future Series tournament
