= Badminton Korea Association =

Korean national badminton association

Badminton Korea Association 대한배드민턴협회
- Formation: 1957
- Type: National Sport Association
- Headquarters: Songpa District, Seoul
- President: Kim Taek-gyu
- Affiliations: BAC, BWF
- Website: koreabadminton.org

Badminton Korea Association (BKA, 대한배드민턴협회; Daehan baedeuminteon hyeobhoe) is the national governing body for the sport of badminton in South Korea.

== History ==
Badminton was spread in Korea after Liberation Day and was not organized until the establishment of Badminton Korea Association in 1957. It later become an official sport in Korean National Sports Festival since 1962. In 2019, Yonex replaced Victor as Badminton Korea equipment partner for Badminton Korea Association.

== Presidents ==
List of presidents that have served in the organization since 1957.

No.	Name	Years
1	Choi Geon-woo	15 November 1957 - 30 March 1960
2	Cheon Byung-kyu	30 March 1960 - 1 November 1961
3	Lee Yoon-yong	1 November 1961 - 5 March 1963
4	Jang Ji-ryang	5 March 1963 - 25 March 1964
5	Park Yoo-deuk	25 March 1964 - 20 January 1966
6	Kim Dong-bae	20 January 1966 - 1 May 1966; 25 June 1966 - 28 January 1967
7	Jang Chun-sik	1 May 1966 - 25 June 1966
8	Park Chang-won	28 January 1967 - 10 February 1968
9	Kim Jong-ho	10 February 1968 - 11 December 1968
10	Jang Gan-yong	11 December 1968 - 4 December 1969
11	Han Ok-shin	4 December 1969 - 23 April 1978
12	Go Heung-moon	23 April 1978 - 5 October 1980
13	Yoo Yi-gyun	5 October 1980 - 6 March 1991
14	Jung Jeong-hoon	6 March 1991 - 27 December 1996
15	Lee Hyung-do	27 December 1996 - 13 February 2001
16	Lee Hyung-do	13 February 2001 - 14 July 2003
17	Kang Young-joong	14 July 2003 - 16 January 2009
18	Oh Seong-gi	16 January 2009 - 29 January 2013
19	Shin Gye-ryun	29 January 2013 - 22 March 2016
19	Park Ki-hyun	22 March 2016 - 9 December 2020
20	Kim Taek-gyu	15 January 2021 - present

== Tournaments ==
- Korea Open, an annual open tournament that attracts the world's elite players and currently part of BWF World Tour.
- Korea Masters, annual tournament held since 2007.
- Korea DB badminton league
