= Kim Jae-hyeon =

South Korean badminton player (born 2002)

Personal information
- Born: 20 December 2002 (age 23) Gangjin, South Jeolla, South Korea

Sport
- Country: South Korea
- Sport: Badminton

Mixed doubles
- Highest ranking: 22 (XD with Jang Ha-jeong, 6 October 2026)
- Current ranking: 22 (XD with Jang Ha-jeong, 10 November 2026)
- BWF profile
Medal record
Men's badminton
Representing South Korea
Asian Championships
Gold medal – first place	2026 Ningbo	Mixed doubles

Kim Jae-hyeon (Korean: 김재현; born 20 December 2002) is a South Korean badminton player.

== Career ==
Kim won the 2025 Korea Masters partnering Jeong Na-eun, defeating Malaysian pair in the final. In 2026, ranked 147th in the world, Kim Jae-hyeon along with his partner Jang Ha-jeong went on to win 2026 Badminton Asia Championships as qualifiers, defeating several seeded players before getting a walkover in the final against Thai pair.

== Personal life ==
Jae-hyeon's father Kim Kang-seok served as the Vice President of Gangjin Badminton Association. Jae-hyeon studied at Gyerim Elementary School and then went to Jeonnam National University High School.

== Achievements ==
=== Asian Championships ===
Mixed doubles
Year	Venue	Partner	Opponent	Score	Result	Ref.
2026	Ningbo Olympic Sports Center Gymnasium, Ningbo, China	(South Korea) Jang Ha-jeong	(Thailand) Dechapol Puavaranukroh (Thailand) Supissara Paewsampran	Walkover	Gold	

=== BWF World Tour (1 title, 1 runner-up) ===
The BWF World Tour, which was announced on 19 March 2017 and implemented in 2018, is a series of elite badminton tournaments sanctioned by the Badminton World Federation (BWF). The BWF World Tour is divided into levels of World Tour Finals, Super 1000, Super 750, Super 500, Super 300, and the BWF Tour Super 100.

Mixed doubles
Year	Tournament	Level	Partner	Opponent	Score	Result	Ref.
2025	Korea Masters	Super 300	(South Korea) Jeong Na-eun	(Malaysia) Jimmy Wong (Malaysia) Lai Pei Jing	24–22, 21–18	(gold) Winner	
2026	Korea Masters	Super 300	(South Korea) Jang Ha-jeong	(Japan) Yuta Watanabe (Japan) Maya Taguchi	19–21, 14–21	(silver) Runner-up	

=== BWF International Challenge/Series (4 titles, 1 runner-up) ===
Men's doubles
Year	Tournament	Partner	Opponent	Score	Result	Ref.
2024 (I)	Indonesia International	(South Korea) Ki Dong-ju	(Indonesia) Raymond Indra (Indonesia) Patra Harapan Rindorindo	21–15, 21–12	(gold) Winner	
2025	Northern Marianas International	(South Korea) Lee Sang-won	(Japan) Akira Koga (Japan) Naoya Kawashima	21–16, 21–15	(gold) Winner	
2025	Malaysia International	(South Korea) Lee Sang-won	(Malaysia) Muhammad Faiq (Malaysia) Lok Hong Quan	16–21, 21–19, 14–21	(silver) Runner-up	

Mixed doubles
Year	Tournament	Partner	Opponent	Score	Result	Ref.
2025	Northern Marianas International	(South Korea) Kim Min-ji	(Japan) Akira Koga (Japan) Yuho Imai	21–13, 16–21, 21–18	(gold) Winner	
2025	Malaysia International	(South Korea) Jang Ha-jeong	(South Korea) Noh Jin-seong (South Korea) Ye Na-lee	21–8, 21–18	(gold) Winner	

BWF International Challenge tournament
BWF International Series tournament

=== Junior International (2 titles) ===
Boys' doubles
Year	Tournament	Partner	Opponent	Score	Result
2019	Jakarta Junior International	(South Korea) Jin Yong	(Indonesia) Dwiki Rafian Restu (Indonesia) Bernadus Bagas Kusuma Wardana	11–21, 21–18, 21–12	(gold) Winner
2019	Korean Junior International	(South Korea) Na Gwang-min	(Hong Kong) Ko Shing Hei (Hong Kong) Lui Chun Wai	21–16, 21–17	(gold) Winner

BWF Junior International Challenge tournament
BWF Junior International Series tournament
