= Jimmy Wong (badminton) =

Malaysian badminton player (born 2002)

Jimmy Wong 黄显维
Personal information
- Born: August 13, 2002 (age 24) Kajang, Selangor, Malaysia
- Height: 174 cm (5 ft 9 in)

Sport
- Country: Malaysia
- Sport: Badminton
- Handedness: Right

Men's & mixed doubles
- Highest ranking: 68 (MD with Lwi Sheng Hao, 2 April 2024); 23 (XD with Lai Pei Jing, 10 March 2026)
- Current ranking: 32 (XD with Cheng Su Yin, 3 November 2026)
- BWF profile

Jimmy Wong (simplified Chinese: 黄显维; traditional Chinese: 黃顯維; pinyin: Huáng Xiǎnwéi, born 13 August 2002) is a Malaysian badminton player who competes in men's and mixed doubles. A multiple BWF World Tour mixed doubles runner-up, he reached the finals of the 2025 Macau Open and 2025 Korea Masters alongside his former partner Lai Pei Jing. The pair also finished runners-up at two Indonesia Masters Super 100 tournaments in 2025, marking a series of significant achievements during their first year competing together. Wong and Lai achieved a career-high mixed doubles world ranking of number 23 on 10 March 2026.

Wong began his senior international career primarily in men's doubles, partnering Lwi Sheng Hao to reach the finals of the 2023 Slovenia Open and Austrian Open. After leaving the national badminton setup in 2022, he competed as an independent player before forming a mixed doubles partnership with Lai in 2025 following the retirement of her longtime partner Tan Kian Meng. Together, they reached several international finals, including their first BWF World Tour Super 300 final at the 2025 Macau Open, where they lost to Denmark's Mathias Christiansen and Alexandra Bøje. Their subsequent runner-up finish at the 2025 Korea Masters was another notable result during their partnership.

In April 2026, Wong rejoined the Badminton Association of Malaysia (BAM) and formed a new mixed doubles partnership with Cheng Su Yin. Together, they reached the semifinals of the 2026 Japan Open, a BWF World Tour Super 750 tournament, before losing to Hong Kong's Tang Chun Man and Tse Ying Suet.

== Career ==
Jimmy Wong started his career mostly as an independent player after being dropped by BAM in 2022. In 2023, he mainly partnered with Lwi Sheng Hao in the men's doubles category. This pairing resulted in two finals in 2023, the Slovenia Open and the Austrian Open, where the pair lost to their countrymen Low Hang Yee and Ng Eng Cheong on both occasions.

In 2025, Lai Pei Jing chose Wong as her new partner in mixed doubles after her previous partner, Tan Kian Meng, retired after the 2025 All England Open. This partnership started well with three international-level finals in Vietnam, Thailand and Réunion. They reached their first BWF World Tour tournament final at the Macau Open but finished as runners-up to Mathias Christiansen and Alexandra Bøje. Wong and Lai secured another final at the Indonesia Masters Super 100 I but lost again to the same Danish pair. In October, they hit the final again in Indonesia Masters Super 100 II where they lost to the home pair, Marwan Faza and Aisyah Salsabila Putri Pranata in three sets. Wong and Lai scored another runner-up finished in Korea Masters which is the seventh time they finished second in a year.

== Achievements ==
=== BWF World Tour (4 runners-up) ===
The BWF World Tour, which was announced on 19 March 2017 and implemented in 2018, is a series of elite badminton tournaments, sanctioned by Badminton World Federation (BWF). The BWF World Tour is divided into six levels, namely World Tour Finals, Super 1000, Super 750, Super 500, Super 300 (part of the HSBC World Tour), and the BWF Tour Super 100.

Mixed doubles
Year	Tournament	Level	Partner	Opponent	Score	Result	Ref.
2025	Macau Open	Super 300	(Malaysia) Lai Pei Jing	(Denmark) Mathias Christiansen (Denmark) Alexandra Bøje	13–21, 16–21	(silver) Runner-up	
2025 (I)	Indonesia Masters	Super 100	(Malaysia) Lai Pei Jing	(Denmark) Mathias Christiansen (Denmark) Alexandra Bøje	21–13, 21–23, 14–21	(silver) Runner-up	
2025 (II)	Indonesia Masters	Super 100	(Malaysia) Lai Pei Jing	(Indonesia) Marwan Faza (Indonesia) Aisyah Pranata	21–16, 19–21, 3–21	(silver) Runner-up	
2025	Korea Masters	Super 300	(Malaysia) Lai Pei Jing	(South Korea) Kim Jae-hyeon (South Korea) Jeong Na-eun	22–24, 18–21	(silver) Runner-up	

=== BWF International Challenge/Series (5 runners-up) ===
Men's doubles
Year	Tournament	Partner	Opponent	Score	Result	Ref.
2023	Slovenia Open	(Malaysia) Lwi Sheng Hao	(Malaysia) Low Hang Yee (Malaysia) Ng Eng Cheong	20–22, 18–21	(silver) Runner-up	
2023	Austrian Open	(Malaysia) Lwi Sheng Hao	(Malaysia) Low Hang Yee (Malaysia) Ng Eng Cheong	11–21, 17–21	(silver) Runner-up	

Mixed doubles
Year	Tournament	Partner	Opponent	Score	Result	Ref.
2025	Vietnam International	(Malaysia) Lai Pei Jing	(Hong Kong) Tang Chun Man (Hong Kong) Ng Tsz Yau	19–21, 19–21	(silver) Runner-up	
2025	Thailand International	(Malaysia) Lai Pei Jing	(China) Gao Jiaxuan (China) Wu Mengying	17–21, 16–21	(silver) Runner-up	
2025	Réunion Open	(Malaysia) Lai Pei Jing	(Germany) Marvin Seidel (Germany) Thuc Phuong Nguyen	21–17, 20–22, 18–21	(silver) Runner-up	

BWF International Challenge tournament
BWF International Series tournament
