= Tee Kai Wun =

Malaysian badminton player (born 2000)

Tee Kai Wun 郑凯文
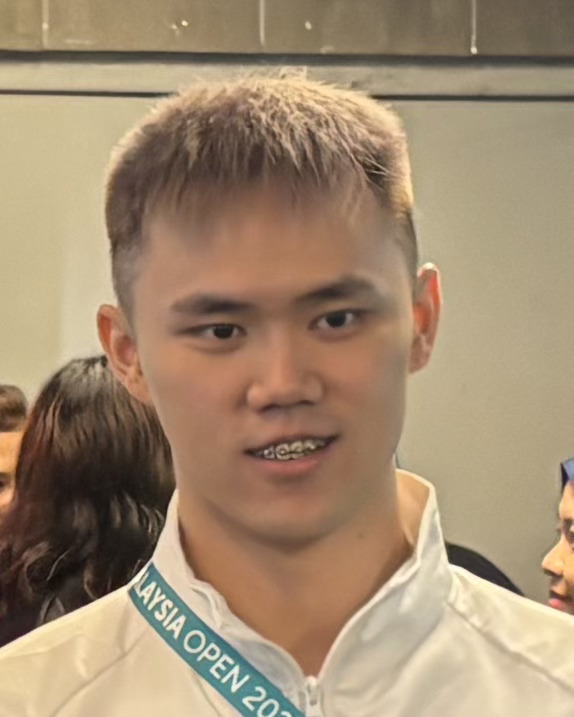
- Tee at the 2025 Petronas Malaysia Open

Personal information
- Nickname: Kai Wun
- Born: 17 April 2000 (age 26) Malacca, Malaysia
- Height: 1.73 m (5 ft 8 in)

Sport
- Country: Malaysia
- Sport: Badminton
- Handedness: Right
- Coached by: Herry Iman Pierngadi

Men's doubles
- Highest ranking: 4 (with Man Wei Chong, 16 December 2025)
- Current ranking: 9 (with Man Wei Chong, 10 November 2026)
- BWF profile
Medal record
Men's badminton
Representing Malaysia
Sudirman Cup
Bronze medal – third place	2021 Vantaa	Mixed team
Asia Team Championships
Gold medal – first place	2022 Selangor	Men's team
SEA Games
Silver medal – second place	2021 Vietnam	Men's team
Silver medal – second place	2025 Thailand	Men's team
Bronze medal – third place	2025 Thailand	Men's doubles
World Junior Championships
Silver medal – second place	2017 Yogyakarta	Mixed team

Tee Kai Wun (simplified Chinese: 郑凯文; traditional Chinese: 鄭凱文; pinyin: Zhèng Kǎiwén, born 17 April 2000) is a Malaysian badminton player. A multiple BWF World Tour tournament champion, he and his longtime partner Man Wei Chong won the men's doubles titles at the 2025 Indonesia Masters and 2025 Malaysia Masters, both BWF World Tour Super 500 tournaments, and finished runners-up at the 2024 Indonesia Open, a Super 1000 tournament. They reached a career-high world ranking of number four on 16 December 2025. Their Malaysia Masters triumph ended a 12-year wait for a Malaysian men's doubles title at the home tournament, becoming the first Malaysian pair to win the championship since Goh V Shem and Lim Khim Wah in 2013.

Together with Man, Tee also won the 2022 Syed Modi International and consecutive Taipei Open titles in 2022 and 2023. Following a restructuring of Malaysia's men's doubles partnerships in 2026, he won the 2026 Korea Masters with Yap Roy King, defeating Man Wei Chong and Soh Wooi Yik in an all-Malaysian final.

In team competitions, Tee was part of Malaysia's gold-medal-winning men's team at the 2022 Badminton Asia Team Championships and bronze-medal-winning mixed team at the 2021 Sudirman Cup. He also won silver medals in the men's team events at the 2021 and 2025 SEA Games, a men's doubles bronze medal at the 2025 SEA Games with Man, and a mixed team silver medal at the 2017 BWF World Junior Championships.

== Career ==
=== 2017–2019 ===
In 2017, he won a silver medal at the 2017 BWF World Junior Championships in the mixed team event. In June 2018, Tee entered the final of Mauritius International with Ng Yong Chai and finished as runners-up. In December 2019, he won his first senior title at the Bangladesh International in the men's doubles event with Chang Yee Jun.

=== 2021 ===
After more than a year not competing due to the pandemic, Tee made a return to international badminton at the Polish Open in March. He and partner Man Wei Chong won the title after defeating compatriots Chang Yee Jun and Chia Wei Jie in the final. In June, Tee competed at the Spanish International and won the men's doubles and mixed doubles titles with Man and Teoh Mei Xing respectively. He was then selected to represent Malaysia at the 2021 Sudirman Cup and 2020 Thomas & Uber Cup. In October, Tee and Man finished as runners-up to Terry Hee and Loh Kean Hean at the Czech Open. In November, the pair won their third title of the year at the Irish Open. In December, they end the season with a runner-up finish at the Welsh International.

=== 2022 ===
In January, Tee and Man claimed their first BWF World Tour title by winning the 2022 Syed Modi International. He was part of Malaysia's men's team that won gold at the 2022 Badminton Asia Team Championships in February. In May, he made his debut at the 2021 SEA Games where he helped Malaysia win the silver medal in the men's team event. In July, Tee and Man captured the 2022 Taipei Open title beating reigning Olympic champion Lee Yang and Wang Chi-lin in three games.

=== 2023 ===
In May, Tee and Man entered their first final of the year at home event 2023 Malaysia Masters, but lost out to Korean pair of Kang Min-hyuk and Seo Seung-jae. In June, they successfully defended their title at the 2023 Taipei Open after defeating home pair Lu Ching-yao and Yang Po-han. In August, the pair made their debut at the 2023 BWF World Championships but fell in the third round to Liang Weikeng and Wang Chang in three games. In October, they made it to the 2023 Arctic Open final and finished as runners-up to Denmark's Kim Astrup and Anders Skaarup Rasmussen.

=== 2024 ===
In June, contesting their first BWF World Tour Super 1000 final at the 2024 Indonesia Open, Tee and Man went down to Liang and Wang, finishing second.

=== 2025 ===
At the beginning of the new season in January, Tee and Man went to the semi-finals on their home ground Malaysia Open before they lost against Chen Boyang and Liu Yi in 3 sets. Their luck changes in the next two tournaments when they redeem their lost in Indonesia the previous year by winning Indonesia Masters against the home favourite, Fajar Alfian and Muhammad Rian Ardianto in straight sets. Tee and Man ended a 12 years droughts for home title in Malaysia Masters after prevailed in All-Malaysian finals against Aaron Chia and Soh Wooi Yik. In December, he competed in the SEA Games in Thailand. He won the silver medal in the team event, and a bronze in the men's doubles.

=== 2026 ===
Tee and Man did not start the year with good performance as they only managed to reach several quarter-final berths, including at the Malaysia Open, India Open and All England Open. In August, BAM shuffled up the existing pair to seek for the best pairings where in the Korea Masters, he would play alongside Yap Roy King. After getting a walkover in the semifinal due to injury for the Japanese pair of Shuji Sawada and Daigo Tanaka, Tee and Yap capitalized on that opportunity and won an All-Malaysian final in that tournament against his old partner, Man Wei Chong and Soh Wooi Yik. Tee reunited with Man in October in which they sealed their first title of the year as a pair in all-Malaysian finals in French Open as they won against Goh Sze Fei and Nur Izzuddin in 44 minutes. In November, Tee and Man added their title as they ended the 27 year drought by winning the Hong Kong Open against the reigning Asian Games gold medalists, Leo Rolly Carnando and Daniel Marthin of Indonesia in 39 minutes.

== Achievements ==
=== SEA Games ===
Men's doubles
Year	Venue	Partner	Opponent	Score	Result	Ref.
2025	Gymnasium 4, Thammasat University Rangsit Campus; Pathum Thani, Thailand	(Malaysia) Man Wei Chong	(Indonesia) Sabar Karyaman Gutama (Indonesia) Muhammad Reza Pahlevi Isfahani	16–21, 17–21	Bronze	

=== BWF World Tour (8 titles, 3 runners-up) ===
The BWF World Tour, which was announced on 19 March 2017 and implemented in 2018, is a series of elite badminton tournaments sanctioned by the Badminton World Federation (BWF). The BWF World Tour is divided into levels of World Tour Finals, Super 1000, Super 750, Super 500, Super 300 (part of the HSBC World Tour), and the BWF Tour Super 100.

Men's doubles
Year	Tournament	Level	Partner	Opponent	Score	Result	Ref.
2022	Syed Modi International	Super 300	(Malaysia) Man Wei Chong	(India) Krishna Prasad Garaga (India) Vishnuvardhan Goud Panjala	21–18, 21–15	(gold) Winner	
2022	Taipei Open	Super 300	(Malaysia) Man Wei Chong	(Chinese Taipei) Lee Yang (Chinese Taipei) Wang Chi-lin	21–18, 11–21, 21–18	(gold) Winner	
2023	Malaysia Masters	Super 500	(Malaysia) Man Wei Chong	(South Korea) Kang Min-hyuk (South Korea) Seo Seung-jae	15–21, 24–22, 19–21	(silver) Runner-up	
2023	Taipei Open	Super 300	(Malaysia) Man Wei Chong	(Chinese Taipei) Lu Ching-yao (Chinese Taipei) Yang Po-han	20–22, 21–17, 21–14	(gold) Winner	
2023	Arctic Open	Super 500	(Malaysia) Man Wei Chong	(Denmark) Kim Astrup (Denmark) Anders Skaarup Rasmussen	18–21, 17–21	(silver) Runner-up	
2024	Indonesia Open	Super 1000	(Malaysia) Man Wei Chong	(China) Liang Weikeng (China) Wang Chang	21–19, 16–21, 12–21	(silver) Runner-up	
2025	Indonesia Masters	Super 500	(Malaysia) Man Wei Chong	(Indonesia) Fajar Alfian (Indonesia) Muhammad Rian Ardianto	21–11, 21–19	(gold) Winner	
2025	Malaysia Masters	Super 500	(Malaysia) Man Wei Chong	(Malaysia) Aaron Chia (Malaysia) Soh Wooi Yik	21–12, 15–21, 21–16	(gold) Winner	
2026	Korea Masters	Super 300	(Malaysia) Yap Roy King	(Malaysia) Man Wei Chong (Malaysia) Soh Wooi Yik	21–13, 21–18	(gold) Winner	
2026	French Open	Super 750	(Malaysia) Man Wei Chong	(Malaysia) Goh Sze Fei (Malaysia) Nur Izzuddin	13–21, 21–15, 21–7	(gold) Winner	
2026	Hong Kong Open	Super 500	(Malaysia) Man Wei Chong	(Indonesia) Leo Rolly Carnando (Indonesia) Daniel Marthin	21–19, 21–18	(gold) Winner	

=== BWF International Challenge/Series (5 titles, 3 runners-up) ===
Men's doubles
Year	Tournament	Partner	Opponent	Score	Result
2018	Mauritius International	(Malaysia) Ng Yong Chai	(Austria) Daniel Graßmück (Austria) Roman Zirnwald	21–16, 12–21, 14–21	(silver) Runner-up
2019	Bangladesh International	(Malaysia) Chang Yee Jun	(India) Arjun M. R. (India) Dhruv Kapila	21–19, 21–16	(gold) Winner
2021	Polish Open	(Malaysia) Man Wei Chong	(Malaysia) Chang Yee Jun (Malaysia) Chia Wei Jie	21–17, 20–22, 21–19	(gold) Winner
2021	Spanish International	(Malaysia) Man Wei Chong	(France) Lucas Corvée (France) Ronan Labar	21–15, 21–18	(gold) Winner
2021	Czech Open	(Malaysia) Man Wei Chong	(Singapore) Terry Hee (Singapore) Loh Kean Hean	21–13, 15–21, 15–21	(silver) Runner-up
2021	Irish Open	(Malaysia) Man Wei Chong	(England) Rory Easton (England) Zach Russ	21–7, 21–17	(gold) Winner
2021	Welsh International	(Malaysia) Man Wei Chong	(South Korea) Kim Gi-jung (South Korea) Kim Sa-rang	18–21, 21–18, 15–21	(silver) Runner-up

Mixed doubles
Year	Tournament	Partner	Opponent	Score	Result
2021	Spanish International	(Malaysia) Teoh Mei Xing	(England) Callum Hemming (England) Jessica Pugh	21–15, 13–21, 21–19	(gold) Winner

BWF International Challenge tournament
BWF International Series tournament
BWF Future Series tournament
