= Korea Masters =

Annual badminton tournament in South Korea

- Official website
- Founded: 2007; 19 years ago
- Editions: 18 (2026)
- Location: Asan (2026); South Korea
- Venue: Yi Sun-sin Gymnasium (2026)
- Prize money: US$240,000 (2026)

Men's
- Draw: 32S / 32D
- Current champions: Zhu Xuanchen (singles); Tee Kai Wun; Yap Roy King (doubles)
- Most singles titles: 3 Lee Dong-keun
- Most doubles titles: 4 Ko Sung-hyun; Lee Yong-dae

Women's
- Draw: 32S / 32D
- Current champions: Ashmita Chaliha (singles); Luo Yi; Wang Tingge (doubles)
- Most singles titles: 3 Sung Ji-hyun
- Most doubles titles: 5 Jung Kyung-eun; Chang Ye-na

Mixed doubles
- Draw: 32
- Current champions: Yuta Watanabe; Maya Taguchi
- Most titles (male): 3 Yoo Yeon-seong; Ko Sung-hyun
- Most titles (female): 3 Kim Ha-na

Super 300
- Canada Open; German Open; Korea Masters; Macau Open; New Zealand Open; Orléans Masters; Spain Masters; Swiss Open; Syed Modi International; Taipei Open; Thailand Masters; U.S. Open

Last completed
- 2026 Korea Masters

The Korea Masters (Korean: 코리아마스터즈) is an international badminton tournament that usually held in November or December every year of BWF event calendar in South Korea. The total prize money in 2016 was US$120,000. Before 2010, the level of the tournament was an International Challenge, which is the fourth level tournament of international badminton tournament. It began in 2007, when it was held in Suwon, then it moved to Yeosu in 2008 and Hwasun in 2009. In 2010, it was turned into a BWF Grand Prix event.

It became a BWF Grand Prix Gold event in 2011, and it remained at that level through the end of Grand Prix Gold in 2017, with the exception of 2014, when it changed back to Grand Prix status, the same year Korea hosted both the Asian Games and the Badminton Asia Championships. The tournament was held in cities in the southwest from 2011 to 2017: in Hwasun in 2011 and 2012, then in Jeonju for 2013 to 2015, then Seogwipo and Gwangju. In 2015, the name of the tournament changed to Korea Masters.

In 2018, this tournament is the part of the BWF World Tour Super 300, after the Grand Prix Gold event ceased.

== History of host cities ==
| City | Years host |
|---|---|
| Suwon | 2007 |
| Yeosu | 2008 |
| Hwasun | 2009, 2011–2012 |
| Gimcheon | 2010 |
| Jeonju | 2013–2015 |
| Seogwipo | 2016 |
| Gwangju | 2017–2019, 2022–2023 |
| Iksan | 2024–2025 |
| Asan | 2026 |

Locations of Korea Masters host cities

== Winners ==
| Year | Men's singles | Women's singles | Men's doubles | Women's doubles | Mixed doubles | Ref |
|---|---|---|---|---|---|---|
| 2007 | (South Korea) Shon Seung-mo | (South Korea) Lee Yun-hwa | (South Korea) Ko Sung-hyun (South Korea) Kwon Yi-goo | (South Korea) Jung Kyung-eun (South Korea) Yoo Hyun-young | (South Korea) Shin Baek-cheol (South Korea) Yoo Hyun-young | |
| 2008 | (South Korea) Park Sung-hwan | (South Korea) Kwon Hee-sook | (South Korea) Jung Jae-sung (South Korea) Lee Yong-dae | (South Korea) Ha Jung-eun (South Korea) Kim Min-jung | (South Korea) Hwang Ji-man (South Korea) Hwang Yu-mi | |
| 2009 | (South Korea) Rho Ye-wook | (South Korea) Bae Yeon-ju | (South Korea) Jung Jae-sung (South Korea) Lee Yong-dae | (South Korea) Jung Kyung-eun (South Korea) Yoo Hyun-young | (South Korea) Lee Yong-dae (South Korea) Lee Hyo-jung | |
| 2010 | (China) Bao Chunlai | (China) Liu Xin | (South Korea) Jung Jae-sung (South Korea) Lee Yong-dae | (South Korea) Jung Kyung-eun (South Korea) Yoo Hyun-young | (South Korea) Yoo Yeon-seong (South Korea) Kim Min-jung | |
| 2011 | (South Korea) Lee Hyun-il | (South Korea) Sung Ji-hyun | (South Korea) Ko Sung-hyun (South Korea) Yoo Yeon-seong | (South Korea) Eom Hye-won (South Korea) Chang Ye-na | (South Korea) Yoo Yeon-seong (South Korea) Chang Ye-na | |
| 2012 | (South Korea) Lee Dong-keun | (South Korea) Sung Ji-hyun | (South Korea) Ko Sung-hyun (South Korea) Lee Yong-dae | (South Korea) Eom Hye-won (South Korea) Chang Ye-na | (South Korea) Shin Baek-cheol (South Korea) Eom Hye-won | |
| 2013 | (South Korea) Lee Hyun-il | (South Korea) Bae Yeon-ju | (South Korea) Kim Gi-jung (South Korea) Kim Sa-rang | (South Korea) Chang Ye-na (South Korea) Kim So-yeong | (South Korea) Yoo Yeon-seong (South Korea) Chang Ye-na | |
| 2014 | (South Korea) Lee Dong-keun | (Japan) Nozomi Okuhara | (South Korea) Lee Yong-dae (South Korea) Yoo Yeon-seong | (South Korea) Lee So-hee (South Korea) Shin Seung-chan | (South Korea) Choi Sol-gyu (South Korea) Shin Seung-chan | |
| 2015 | (South Korea) Lee Dong-keun | (Japan) Sayaka Sato | (South Korea) Kim Gi-jung (South Korea) Kim Sa-rang | (South Korea) Chang Ye-na (South Korea) Lee So-hee | (South Korea) Ko Sung-hyun (South Korea) Kim Ha-na | |
| 2016 | (South Korea) Son Wan-ho | (South Korea) Sung Ji-hyun | (South Korea) Kim Jae-hwan (South Korea) Ko Sung-hyun | (South Korea) Jung Kyung-eun (South Korea) Shin Seung-chan | (South Korea) Ko Sung-hyun (South Korea) Kim Ha-na | |
| 2017 | (South Korea) Jeon Hyeok-jin | (China) Gao Fangjie | (South Korea) Kim Won-ho (South Korea) Seo Seung-jae | (South Korea) Lee So-hee (South Korea) Shin Seung-chan | (South Korea) Seo Seung-jae (South Korea) Kim Ha-na | |
| 2018 | (South Korea) Son Wan-ho | (China) Li Xuerui | (South Korea) Choi Sol-gyu (South Korea) Seo Seung-jae | (South Korea) Chang Ye-na (South Korea) Jung Kyung-eun | (South Korea) Ko Sung-hyun (South Korea) Eom Hye-won | |
| 2019 | (Japan) Kanta Tsuneyama | (South Korea) An Se-young | (Chinese Taipei) Lee Yang (Chinese Taipei) Wang Chi-lin | (Japan) Nami Matsuyama (Japan) Chiharu Shida | (Hong Kong) Tang Chun Man (Hong Kong) Tse Ying Suet | |
| 2020 | Cancelled (Note: This tournament, originally to be played from 24 to 29 November, was later cancelled due to the COVID-19 pandemic in South Korea.) | | | | | |
| 2021 | Cancelled (Note: This tournament, originally to be played from 1 to 6 June, was later cancelled due to the COVID-19 pandemic in South Korea.) | | | | | |
| 2022 | (South Korea) Jeon Hyeok-jin | (China) He Bingjiao | (South Korea) Kim Gi-jung (South Korea) Kim Sa-rang | (South Korea) Kim So-yeong (South Korea) Kong Hee-yong | (China) Wang Yilyu (China) Huang Dongping | |
| 2023 | (Japan) Kento Momota | (South Korea) Kim Ga-eun | (Chinese Taipei) Lee Jhe-huei (Chinese Taipei) Yang Po-hsuan | (South Korea) Jeong Na-eun (South Korea) Kim Hye-jeong | (South Korea) Seo Seung-jae (South Korea) Chae Yoo-jung | |
| 2024 | (Thailand) Kunlavut Vitidsarn | (Indonesia) Putri Kusuma Wardani | (Malaysia) Aaron Chia (Malaysia) Soh Wooi Yik | (South Korea) Kim Hye-jeong (South Korea) Kong Hee-yong | (China) Guo Xinwa (China) Chen Fanghui | |
| 2025 | (Singapore) Jason Teh | (Chinese Taipei) Chiu Pin-chian | (South Korea) Lee Jong-min (South Korea) Wang Chan | (Japan) Hinata Suzuki (Japan) Nao Yamakita | (South Korea) Kim Jae-hyeon (South Korea) Jeong Na-eun | |
| 2026 | (China) Zhu Xuanchen | (India) Ashmita Chaliha | (Malaysia) Tee Kai Wun (Malaysia) Yap Roy King | (China) Luo Yi (China) Wang Tingge | (Japan) Yuta Watanabe (Japan) Maya Taguchi | |

== Performances by nation ==
As of the 2026 edition

| Pos | Nation | MS | WS | MD | WD | XD | Total |
|---|---|---|---|---|---|---|---|
| 1 | South Korea* | 12 | 9 | 14 | 15 | 14 | 64 |
| 2 | China | 2 | 4 | | 1 | 2 | 9 |
| 3 | Japan | 2 | 2 | | 2 | 1 | 7 |
| 4 | Chinese Taipei | | 1 | 2 | | | 3 |
| 5 | Malaysia | | | 2 | | | 2 |
| 6 | Hong Kong | | | | | 1 | 1 |
| 6 | India | | 1 | | | | 1 |
| 6 | Indonesia | | 1 | | | | 1 |
| 6 | Singapore | 1 | | | | | 1 |
| 6 | Thailand | 1 | | | | | 1 |
| Total | | 18 | 18 | 18 | 18 | 18 | 90 |

* Host nation
