= Luo Yi (badminton) =

Chinese badminton player

Luo Yi 罗意
Personal information
- Born: 29 July 2004 (age 22) Shanghai, China

Sport
- Country: China
- Sport: Badminton
- Handedness: Right

Women's & mixed doubles
- Highest ranking: 20 (WD with Wang Tingge, 8 September 2026); 315 (XD with Hu Keyuan, 26 November 2024)
- Current ranking: 20 (WD with Wang Tingge, 13 October 2026)
- BWF profile
Medal record
Women's badminton
Representing China
Asia Team Championships
Silver medal – second place	2026 Qingdao	Women's team

Luo Yi (Chinese: 罗意; pinyin: Luó Yì; born 29 July 2004) is a Chinese badminton player. Luo was born in Shanghai.

== Career ==
In 2026, Luo Yi achieved a notable milestone on the Asia stage by winning the silver medal in the women's team event at the Asia Team Championships, contributing to China's medal collection at the event.

== Achievement ==
=== BWF World Tour (4 titles) ===
The BWF World Tour, which was announced on 19 March 2017 and implemented in 2018, is a series of elite badminton tournaments sanctioned by the Badminton World Federation (BWF). The BWF World Tour is divided into levels of World Tour Finals, Super 1000, Super 750, Super 500, Super 300, and the BWF Tour Super 100.

Women's doubles

Year	Tournament	Level	Partner	Opponent	Score	Result	Ref
2025	Baoji China Masters	Super 100	(China) Wang Tingge	(China) Qiao Shijun (China) Zheng Yu	17–21, 23–21, 21–15	(gold) Winner	
2025	Vietnam Open	Super 100	(China) Wang Tingge	(China) Liu Jiayue (China) Wang Yiduo	21–15, 21–17	(gold) Winner	
2025	Malaysia Super 100	Super 100	(China) Wang Tingge	(Indonesia) Siti Sarah Azzahra (Indonesia) Az Zahra Ditya Ramadhani	21–13, 21–12	(gold) Winner	
2026	Korea Masters	Super 300	(China) Wang Tingge	(Thailand) Benyapa Aimsaard (Thailand) Nuntakarn Aimsaard	17–21, 21–19, 21–14	(gold) Winner	

=== BWF International Challenge/Series & Future Series (1 runner-up) ===
Women's doubles
Year	Tournament	Partner	Opponent	Score	Result	Ref.
2024	Vietnam International (Ninh Bình)	(China) Hu Shenhan	(China) Lin Fangling (China) Zhou Xinru	15–21, 12–21	(silver) Runner-up	

BWF International Challenge tournament
BWF International Series tournament
BWF Future Series tournament
