= Jason Teh =

Singaporean badminton player (born 2000)

Jason Teh 郑加恒
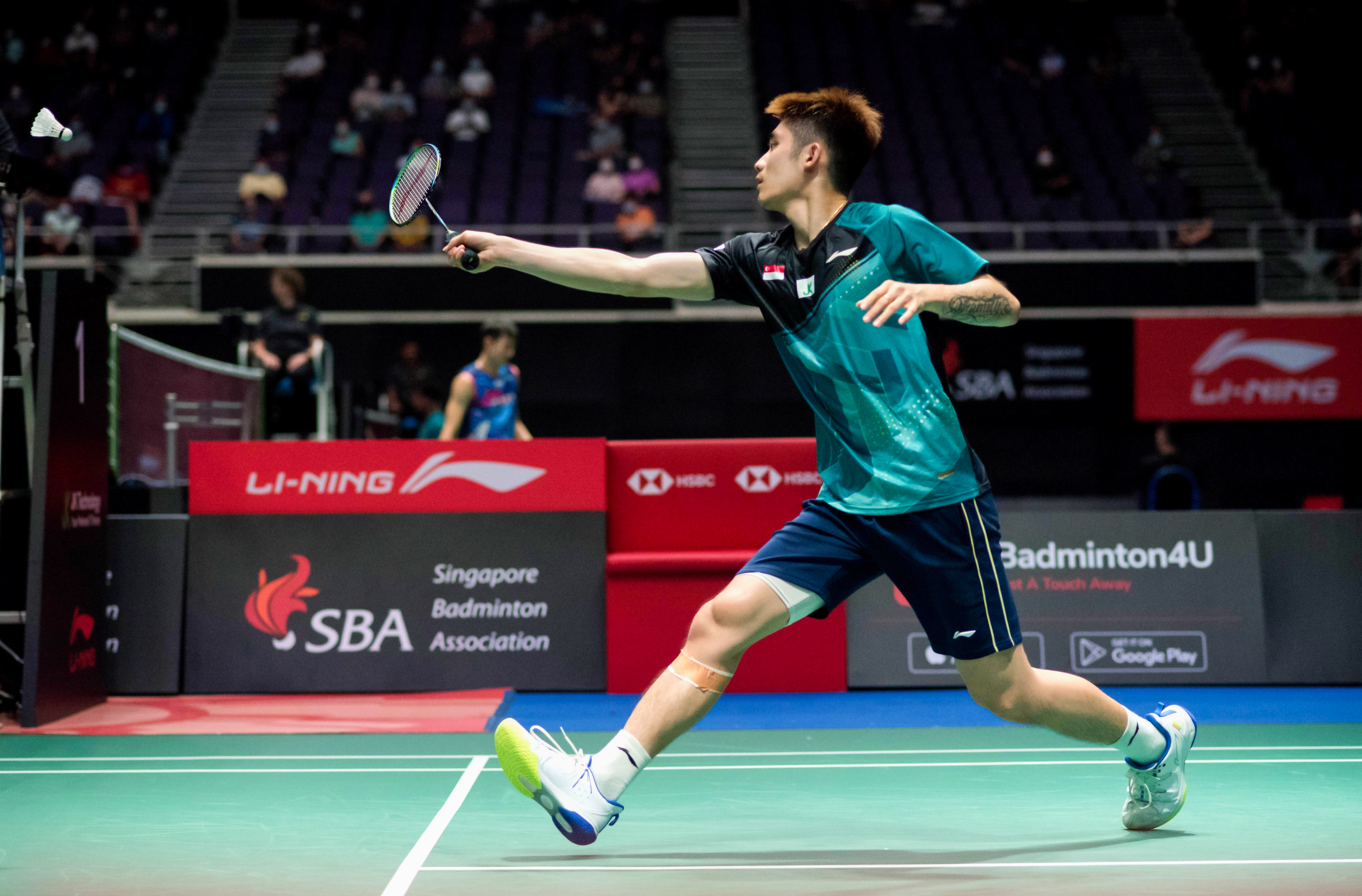
- Teh at the 2022 Singapore Open

Personal information
- Born: Jason Teh Jia Heng; 25 August 2000 (age 26) Penang, Malaysia
- Height: 1.83 m (6 ft 0 in)
- Weight: 78 kg (172 lb)

Sport
- Country: Singapore
- Sport: Badminton
- Handedness: Right
- Coached by: Kim Ji-hyun

Men's singles
- Highest ranking: 19 (18 November 2025)
- Current ranking: 33 (27 October 2026)
- BWF profile
Medal record
Men's badminton
Representing Singapore
Commonwealth Games
Bronze medal – third place	2022 Birmingham	Mixed team
Asia Team Championships
Bronze medal – third place	2022 Selangor	Men's team
SEA Games
Bronze medal – third place	2019 Philippines	Men's team
Bronze medal – third place	2021 Vietnam	Men's team
Bronze medal – third place	2021 Vietnam	Men's singles
Bronze medal – third place	2023 Cambodia	Men's team
Bronze medal – third place	2025 Thailand	Men's team

Jason Teh Jia Heng (Chinese: 郑加恒; pinyin: Zhèng Jiāhéng; born 25 August 2000) is a Singaporean badminton player. He is the former men's singles champion, winning the title at the 2025 Korea Masters and 2025 Thailand Masters. He is the men's singles champion, winning the title at the 2026 Polish Open.

== Early life ==
Teh was born in Penang, Malaysia on 25 August 2000. He started playing badminton when he was four and moved to Singapore to study when he was 11. He was studying at Montfort Junior School and went on to study at Bowen Secondary School. Teh eventually enrolled in the Singapore Sports School and joined the Singapore badminton national team at 17.

== Career ==
Teh won the bronze medal as he was in the men's team at the 2019 SEA Games, where Singapore finished as semi-finalists.

In 2021, he achieved two runner-up positions at the Polish International and the Bahrain International. He was also a semifinalist at the Czech Open.

In February 2022, he and his team were semifinalists at the Badminton Asia Team Championships.

In early May 2022, Jason played as the 2nd men singles for the Singaporean Squad at the Thomas Cup. In the first group match against Indonesia, Teh lost to Jonatan Christie in straight games, 19–21, 13–21. Singapore eventually lost 1–4 overall.

The next day, during Singapore's group match against South Korea, Teh was playing against Jeon Hyeok-jin. When Teh was 14–7 up in the first set, he slipped and injured his right foot, which required immediate treatment. Teh got up and started to play again, winning the first set 21–14. During the 2nd set, at 1–3 down, Teh twisted his right foot, adding a 2nd injury to his right leg. Teh eventually lost the 2nd and 3rd sets, thus losing the match 21–14, 13–21, 14–21. Singapore narrowly lost 2–3 overall in the group match, which meant that Singapore did not advance to the group stage.

Two days later, in the final group match against Thailand, Jason played against Adulrach Namkul. He lost in rubber games, 21–23, 21–14, 17–21. Singapore ended its 3rd Thomas Cup campaign by losing 2–3 to Thailand.

A week later, Teh was in the men's team and the men's singles event at the 2021 SEA Games, entering the semifinals of the men's team In the Individual event, he got into the semifinals by beating Chico Aura Dwi Wardoyo of Indonesia. He then lost to Thailand's Kunlavut Vitidsarn in the semifinals, in straight games, 11–21, 12–21, thus ending up with the joint bronze medal.

At the 2022 Commonwealth Games, Teh won the bronze medal in the mixed team event as the Singaporean team finished as bronze medalists at the event after defeating England 3–0.

A few days after the Mixed team event, Teh took part in the men's singles as the 7th seed. Teh lost to Srikanth Kidambi in the bronze medal match, losing 15–21, 18–21 in straight games. Teh finished 4th place overall.

Teh won the bronze medal as he was in the men's team at the 2023 SEA Games, where Singapore finished in the semi-finals.

=== 2024–2025 ===
In 2024, Teh was the runner-up in two BWF International Challenge competitions: the Polish Open in March and the Luxembourg Open in May. He also performed well in the BWF World Tour tournaments by reaching the semi-finals of the U.S. Open in June and the Vietnam Open in September. During the last week of September, Teh reached his first BWF World Tour final at the Macau Open, finishing second to Hong Kong's Ng Ka Long. He continued his fine run in the BWF World Tour and reached another final at the Malaysia Super 100 in October. However, his search for the first international badminton title was dashed by Taiwanese Chi Yu-jen after losing in the rubber set 12–21, 23–21, 15–21.

In November, Teh took part in the Syed Modi India International, another BWF World Tour 300 event. Seeded fourth, Teh upset home favourite second seed Priyanshu Rajawat through his superb net play and won 21–13, 21–19 to advance to his second men's singles final in two months. However, Teh could not replicate his fine form in the final and was outclassed by India's top seed, Lakshya Sen. He was trumped 6–21, 7–21 in just 31 minutes.

Teh claimed his first BWF World Tour title in the Thailand Masters after beating Wang Zhengxing in the final. After the first success, Teh suffered multiple early exits in his next 16 tournaments. His second title came 10 months later in the South Korean city of Iksan when he defeated Japanese Yudai Okimoto 21–14, 21–15 in the men's singles final of the Korea Masters.

=== 2026 ===
Teh returned to the podium in March 2026 by winning the Polish Open title, a BWF International Challenge event, beating Koshiro Moriguchi from Japan in straight games, 21–9, 21–10, in the final. He made his second final of the year at the Vietnam Open but lost the match against Aidil Sholeh in straight games.

== Personal life ==
Teh served his National Service (NS) for the Singapore Armed Forces (SAF) immediately after secondary school education, forgoing tertiary education in the process, as he wanted to play badminton full-time for Singapore.

== Achievements ==
=== SEA Games ===
Men's singles
Year	Venue	Opponent	Score	Result	Ref.
2021	Bac Giang Gymnasium; Bắc Giang, Vietnam	(Thailand) Kunlavut Vitidsarn	11–21, 12–21	Bronze	

=== BWF World Tour (2 titles, 4 runners-up) ===
The BWF World Tour, which was announced on 19 March 2017 and implemented in 2018, is a series of elite badminton tournaments sanctioned by the Badminton World Federation (BWF). The BWF World Tour is divided into levels of World Tour Finals, Super 1000, Super 750, Super 500, Super 300, and the BWF Tour Super 100.

Men's singles
Year	Tournament	Level	Opponent	Score	Result	Ref.
2024	Macau Open	Super 300	(Hong Kong) Ng Ka Long	19–21, 17–21	(silver) Runner-up	
2024	Malaysia Super 100	Super 100	(Chinese Taipei) Chi Yu-jen	12–21, 23–21, 15–21	(silver) Runner-up	
2024	Syed Modi International	Super 300	(India) Lakshya Sen	6–21, 7–21	(silver) Runner-up	
2025	Thailand Masters	Super 300	(China) Wang Zhengxing	21–18, 15–21, 21–19	(gold) Winner	
2025	Korea Masters	Super 300	(Japan) Yudai Okimoto	21–14, 21–15	(gold) Winner	
2026	Vietnam Open	Super 100	(Malaysia) Aidil Sholeh	16–21, 14–21	(silver) Runner-up	

=== BWF International Challenge/Series (1 title, 4 runners-up) ===
Men's singles
Year	Tournament	Opponent	Score	Result	Ref.
2021	Polish International	(India) Kiran George	21–13, 14–21, 13–21	(silver) Runner-up	
2021	Bahrain International Challenge	(Indonesia) Ikhsan Rumbay	18–21, 15–21	(silver) Runner-up	
2024	Polish Open	(Denmark) Victor Ørding Kauffmann	16–21, 22–20, 23–25	(silver) Runner-up	
2024	Luxembourg Open	(France) Alex Lanier	17–21, 15–21	(silver) Runner-up	
2026	Polish Open	(Japan) Koshiro Moriguchi	21–9, 21–10	(gold) Winner	

BWF International Challenge tournament
BWF International Series tournament
