= Tomoka Miyazaki =

Japanese badminton player (born 2006)

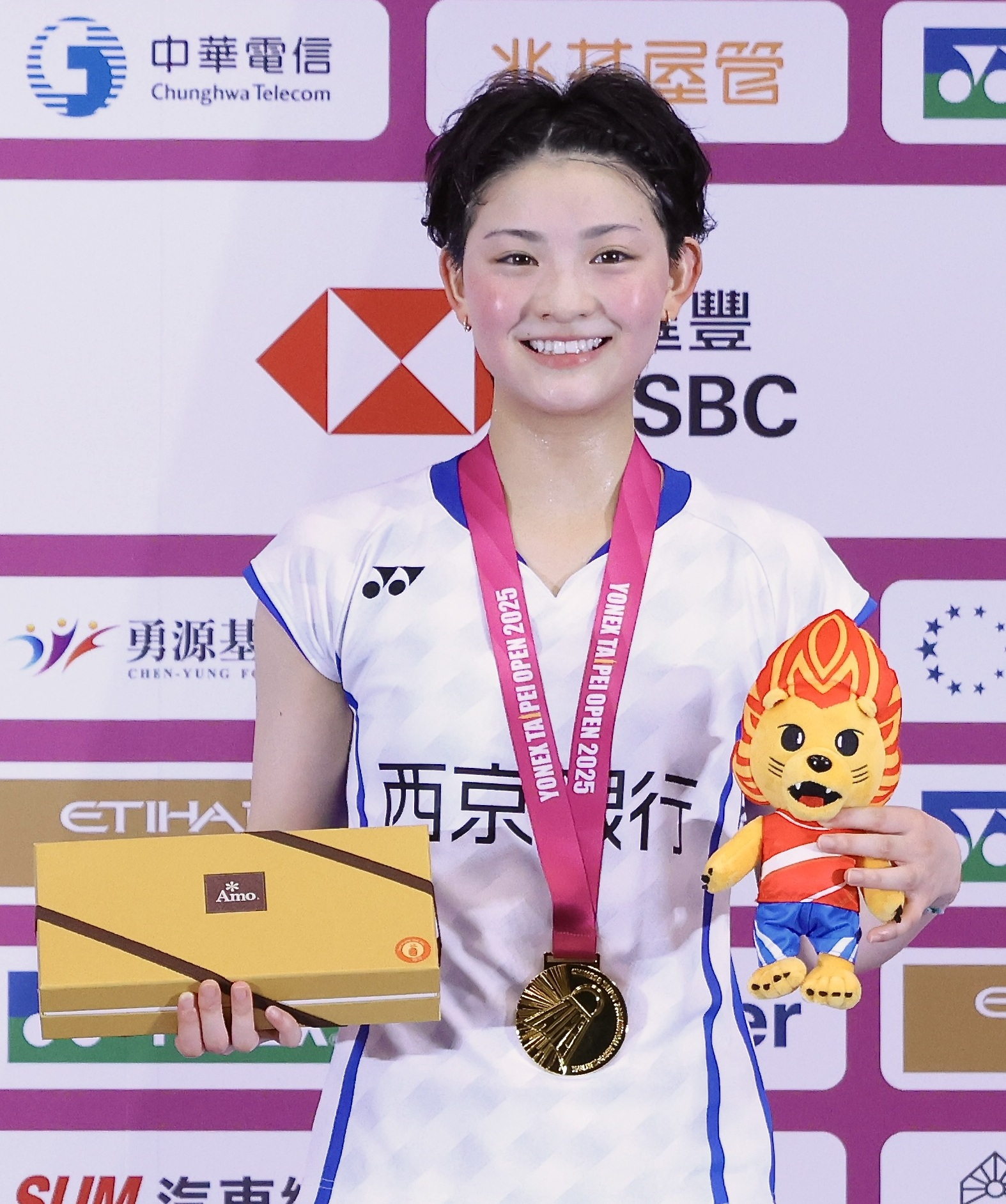
- Miyazaki after winning the 2025 Taipei Open

Personal information
- Born: 17 August 2006 (age 20) Osaka, Japan
- Height: 1.65 m (5 ft 5 in)
- Weight: 49 kg (108 lb)

Sport
- Country: Japan
- Sport: Badminton
- Handedness: Right
- Coached by: Takako Ida; Riichi Takeshita

Women's singles
- Highest ranking: 6 (10 June 2025)
- Current ranking: 7 (6 October 2026)
- BWF profile
Medal record
Women's badminton
Representing Japan
Sudirman Cup
Bronze medal – third place	2025 Xiamen	Mixed team
Uber Cup
Bronze medal – third place	2024 Chengdu	Women's team
Bronze medal – third place	2026 Horsens	Women's team
Asian Games
Silver medal – second place	2026 Aichi–Nagoya	Women's team
Asia Mixed Team Championships
Bronze medal – third place	2025 Qingdao	Mixed team
Asian Team Championships
Bronze medal – third place	2024 Selangor	Women's team
World Junior Championships
Gold medal – first place	2022 Santander	Girls' singles
Bronze medal – third place	2022 Santander	Mixed team
Asian Junior Championships
Gold medal – first place	2023 Yogyakarta	Mixed team

Tomoka Miyazaki (宮崎 友花, Miyazaki Tomoka; born 17 August 2006) is a Japanese badminton player. She was the world junior champion winning the girls' singles title in 2022.

== Career ==
=== 2022 ===
In 2022, Miyazaki primarily competed on the international junior circuit. In June, she earned the runner-up position at the Malaysia Junior International. In October, as a first-year student at Yanai Shoko High School, she won the girls' singles title at the World Junior Championships in Santander, Spain. This victory marked her as the fourth Japanese player to claim the title, following Nozomi Okuhara (2012), Akane Yamaguchi (2013, 2014), and Riko Gunji (2019). She also contributed to Japan's bronze medal in the mixed team event at the same championships. Miyazaki finished the year by winning her first senior-level tournament, capturing the women's singles title at the Slovenia Future Series in November.

=== 2023 ===
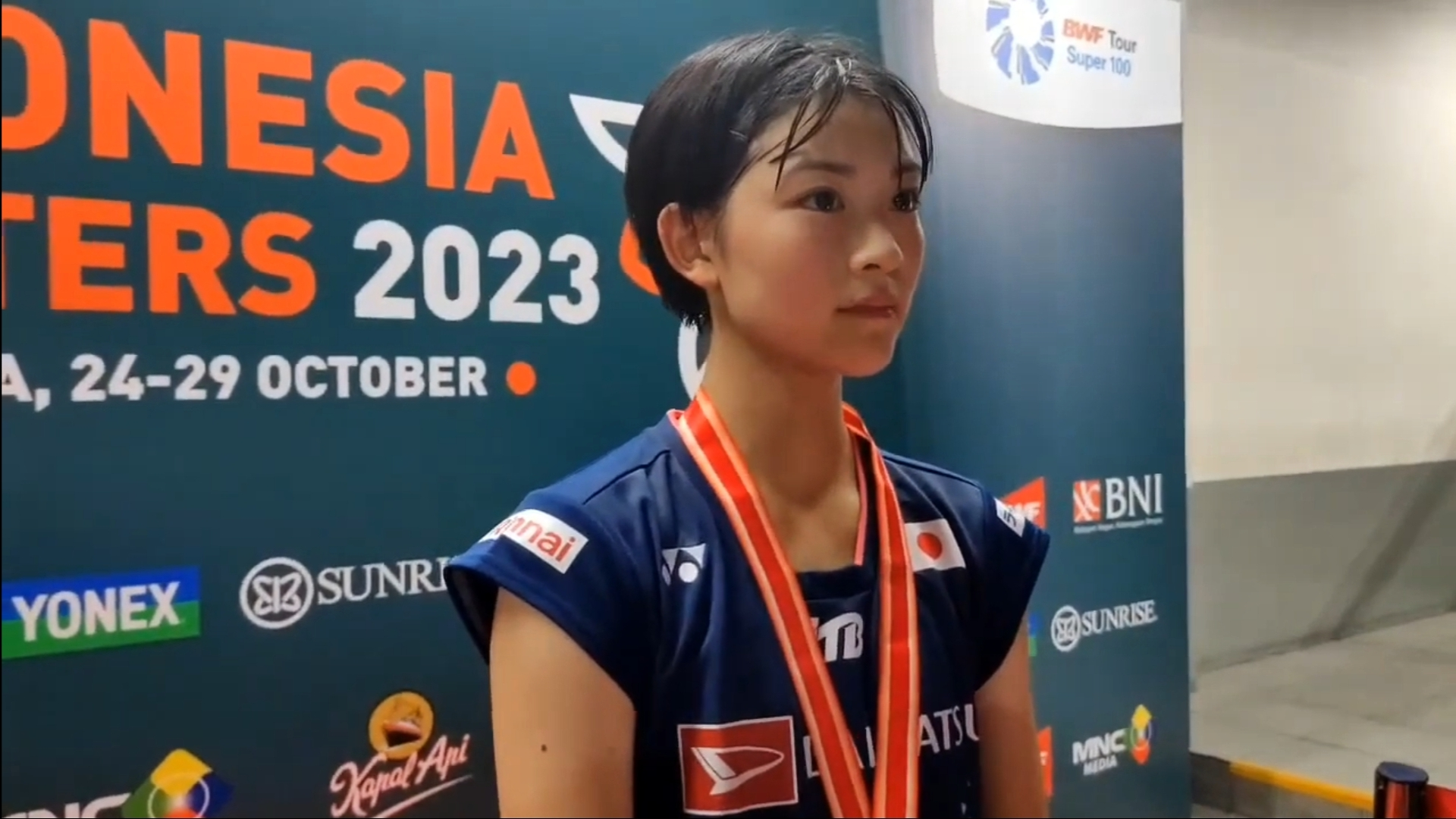
Miyazaki at the Surabaya Masters Badminton Tournament held in Indonesia in 2023

In 2023, Miyazaki joined the Japanese national B team and competed in both international junior and senior tournaments. In July, she contributed to Japan's first gold medal at the Asian Junior Championships since 2012. By the end of the year, she achieved the world #1 position in the BWF World Junior Ranking.

On the International Challenge circuit, Miyazaki won the singles title at the Saipan International in June, following a runner-up finish at the Northern Marianas Open the previous week. In August, she secured the singles title at the Guatemala Future Series and was runner-up in the women's doubles with Maya Taguchi.

Miyazaki won her first BWF World Tour title at the Indonesia Masters II (Super 100) in October and reached her first Super 300 final at the Korea Masters in November, where she finished as runner-up. She also advanced to the second round of the Japan Masters (Super 500) and the Syed Modi International (Super 300). Miyazaki rose from a world ranking of No. 431 at the start of 2023 to a career-high No. 39 by the end of the year.

=== 2024 ===
In 2024, Miyazaki joined the Japanese A National Team. In March, she won her first Super 300 title at the Orléans Masters, defeating compatriot Hina Akechi in the final. The following week, she reached the Swiss Open semi-finals, defeating former world champion P. V. Sindhu in the second round before losing to Olympic champion Carolina Marín. From April to May, she contributed to Japan’s bronze medal at Uber Cup in Chengdu, China.

In September, Miyazaki reached her first Super 1000 final at the China Open, finishing as runner-up to Wang Zhiyi. She also consistently reached the semi-finals at five other tournaments: the Hong Kong Open (Super 500), Macau Open (Super 300), Arctic Open (Super 500), Korea Masters (Super 300), and the China Masters (Super 750).

Domestically, Miyazaki won the team and singles titles at the Inter-High School Championships in August. In December, she claimed the women's singles title at the All Japan Badminton Championships, defeating Natsuki Nidaira in the final, becoming the fourth high school student to win the national championship. She concluded the year with a career-high world ranking of No. 12.

=== 2025 ===
In 2025, Tomoka Miyazaki joined the Japanese national team and turned professional, joining ACT Saikyo in April upon high school graduation. She reached a career-high world ranking of No. 6 on 10 June. On the BWF World Tour, she won her first title of the year at the Taipei Open (Super 300) in May and advanced to the semi-finals of the India Open (Super 750) and the Thailand Open (Super 500). At the Thailand Open, she defeated Ratchanok Intanon in the quarter-finals before being eliminated by Chen Yufei. She also reached the All England Open (Super 1000) quarter-finals, losing to compatriot Akane Yamaguchi. In team competitions, Miyazaki contributed to Japan's bronze medals at the Asia Mixed Team Championships in February and the Sudirman Cup in April–May.

=== 2026 ===
Miyazaki opened the season with a second-round exit at the Malaysia Open. In May, Miyazaki represented Japan at the Uber Cup in Horsens, where she contributed to the team securing a bronze medal. Later that month, she reached the quarterfinals of the Thailand Open, where she lost to Chen Yufei.

== Awards ==
In 2024, Miyazaki received a 1.2 million yen grant from the Kozuki Foundation's Athlete Support Program, which aids promising young high school and university athletes. The foundation presented the award at ceremony in Tokyo on 18 December.

In 2025, Miyazaki was honored with the 2024 Yonex Sports Foundation Minoru Yoneyama Award for her contributions to junior sports promotion. She shared the award with fellow badminton player Aya Tamaki, and it was presented at a ceremony in Tokyo on 17 June 2025.

== Achievements ==
=== World Junior Championships ===
Girls' singles
Year	Venue	Opponent	Score	Result	Ref.
2022	Palacio de Deportes de Santander; Santander, Spain	(China) Yuan Anqi	21–14, 20–22, 21–17	Gold	

=== BWF World Tour (3 titles, 3 runners-up) ===
The BWF World Tour, which was announced on 19 March 2017 and implemented in 2018, is a series of elite badminton tournaments sanctioned by the Badminton World Federation (BWF). The BWF World Tours are divided into levels of World Tour Finals, Super 1000, Super 750, Super 500, Super 300 (part of the HSBC World Tour), and the BWF Tour Super 100.

Women's singles
Year	Tournament	Level	Opponent	Score	Result	Ref.
2023 (II)	Indonesia Masters	Super 100	(Thailand) Pornpicha Choeikeewong	21–9, 21–15	(gold) Winner	
2023	Korea Masters	Super 300	(South Korea) Kim Ga-eun	21–19, 17–21, 12–21	(silver) Runner-up	
2024	Orléans Masters	Super 300	(Japan) Hina Akechi	21–18, 21–12	(gold) Winner	
2024	China Open	Super 1000	(China) Wang Zhiyi	17–21, 15–21	(silver) Runner-up	
2025	Taipei Open	Super 300	(Thailand) Pitchamon Opatniputh	21–12, 20–22, 21–14	(gold) Winner	
2026	China Masters	Super 750	(South Korea) An Se-young	17–21, 6–21	(silver) Runner-up	

=== BWF International Challenge/Series (3 titles, 2 runners-up) ===
Women's singles
Year	Tournament	Opponent	Score	Result	Ref.
2022	Slovenia Future Series	(Japan) Hina Akechi	21–14, 21–19	(gold) Winner	
2023	Northern Marianas Open	(South Korea) Kim Ga-ram	21–15, 23–25, 13–21	(silver) Runner-up	
2023	Saipan International	(South Korea) Kim Ga-ram	21–19, 14–21, 21–17	(gold) Winner	
2023	Guatemala Future Series	(Japan) Mei Sudo	21–17, 19–21, 21–11	(gold) Winner	

Women's doubles
Year	Tournament	Partner	Opponent	Score	Result	Ref.
2023	Guatemala Future Series	(Japan) Maya Taguchi	(Japan) Mei Sudo (Japan) Nao Yamakita	21–16, 14–21, 23–25	(silver) Runner-up	

BWF International Challenge tournament
BWF Future Series tournament

=== BWF Junior International (1 runner-up) ===
Girls' singles
Year	Tournament	Opponent	Score	Result	Ref.
2022	Malaysia Junior International	(Japan) Kokona Ishikawa	17–21, 21–17, 22–24	(silver) Runner-up	

BWF Junior International Series tournament

== Performance timeline ==
Key

W	Won	F	Finalist	SF	Semi-finalist
QF	Quarter-finalist	#R	Rounds 4, 3, 2, 1	RR	Round-robin stage
Q#	Qualification round	A	Absent	w/d	Withdrew
G	Gold	S	Silver	B	Bronze
NH	Not held	N/A	Not applicable	DNQ	Did not qualify

=== National team ===
- Junior level

Team events	2022	2023	Ref
Asian Junior Championships	NH	G	
World Junior Championships	B	5th	

- Senior level

Team events	2024	2025	2026	Ref
Asia Team Championships	B	NH	A	
Asia Mixed Team Championships	NH	B	NH	
Asian Games	NH		S	
Uber Cup	B	NH	B	
Sudirman Cup	NH	B	NH	

=== Individual competitions ===
- Junior level

Events	2022	2023	Ref
Asian Junior Championships	NH	QF	
World Junior Championships	G	QF	

- Senior level

Event	2025	2026	Ref
Asian Championships	2R	QF	
Asian Games	NH	3R	
World Championships	3R	3R	

Tournament	BWF World Tour				Best	Ref
Tournament	2023	2024	2025	2026	Best	Ref
Malaysia Open	A		1R	2R	2R ('26)	
India Open	A		SF	2R	SF ('25)	
Indonesia Masters	A		QF	2R	QF ('25)	
Thailand Masters	A	2R	A		2R ('24)	
German Open	A			SF	SF ('26)	
All England Open	A		QF	QF	QF ('25, '26)	
Swiss Open	A	SF	A	QF	SF ('24)	
Orléans Masters	A	W	QF	A	W ('24)	
Thailand Open	A		SF	QF	SF ('25)	
Malaysia Masters	A			2R	2R ('26)	
Singapore Open	A	2R	2R	QF	QF ('26)	
Indonesia Open	A	1R	2R	QF	QF ('26)	
Macau Open	NH	SF	A		SF ('24)	
Japan Open	A	1R	2R	1R	2R ('25)	
China Open	A	F	1R	SF	F ('24)	
Taipei Open	A		W	A	W ('25)	
Korea Masters	F	SF	A		F ('23)	
China Masters	A	SF	2R	F	F ('26)	
Indonesia Masters Super 100	SF	A			W ('23)	
Indonesia Masters Super 100	W	A			W ('23)	
Arctic Open	A	SF	A	QF	SF ('24)	
Denmark Open	A	2R	QF	QF	QF ('25, '26)	
French Open	A		QF	A	QF ('25)	
Korea Open	A	1R	QF	QF	QF ('25, '26)	
Japan Masters	2R	1R	1R	SF	SF ('26)	
Hong Kong Open	A	SF	QF	SF	SF ('24, '26)	
Syed Modi International	2R	A			2R ('23)	
World Tour Finals	DNQ		RR	Q	RR ('25)	
Spain Masters	A	1R	NH		1R ('24)	
Year-end ranking	39	12	9		9	
Tournament	2023	2024	2025	2026	Best	Ref

== Record against selected opponents ==
Record against year-end Finals finalists, World Championships semi-finalists, and Olympic quarter-finalists. Accurate as of 16 October 2026.

Player	M	W	L	Diff.
(China) Chen Yufei	7	0	7	–7
(China) Han Yue	3	0	3	–3
(China) Wang Zhiyi	5	2	3	–1
(India) P. V. Sindhu	4	1	3	–2
(Indonesia) Gregoria Mariska Tunjung	1	0	1	–1
(Indonesia) Putri Kusuma Wardani	8	4	4	0
(Japan) Aya Ohori	1	1	0	+1

Player	M	W	L	Diff.
(Japan) Nozomi Okuhara	5	3	2	+1
(Japan) Akane Yamaguchi	4	1	3	–2
(Spain) Carolina Marín	1	0	1	–1
(South Korea) An Se-young	8	0	8	–8
(Thailand) Pornpawee Chochuwong	3	0	3	–3
(Thailand) Ratchanok Intanon	5	2	3	–1
