= 2026 Malaysia Masters =

2026 badminton tournament in Malaysia

Tournament details
- Dates: 19–24 May
- Edition: 18th
- Level: Super 500
- Total prize money: US$500,000
- Venue: Unifi Arena
- Location: Kuala Lumpur, Malaysia

Champions
- Men's singles: (China) Li Shifeng
- Women's singles: (Thailand) Ratchanok Intanon
- Men's doubles: (Denmark) Daniel Lundgaard (Denmark) Mads Vestergaard
- Women's doubles: (China) Chen Fanshutian (China) Luo Xumin
- Mixed doubles: (China) Gao Jiaxuan (China) Wei Yaxin

The 2026 Malaysia Masters (officially known as the Perodua Malaysia Masters 2026 presented by Daihatsu for sponsorship reasons) was a badminton tournament that took place at the Unifi Arena, Kuala Lumpur, Malaysia, from 19 to 24 May 2026 and had a total prize of US$500,000.

== Tournament ==
The 2026 Malaysia Masters was the twelfth tournament of the 2026 BWF World Tour and was part of the Malaysia Masters championships, which have been held since 2009. This tournament is organised by the Badminton Association of Malaysia with sanction from the BWF.

=== Venue ===
This international tournament was held at the Unifi Arena inside the KL Sports City in Kuala Lumpur, Malaysia.

=== Point distribution ===
Below was the point distribution table for each phase of the tournament based on the BWF points system for the BWF World Tour Super 500 event.

Winner	Runner-up	3/4	5/8	9/16	17/32	33/64	65/128
9,200	7,800	6,420	5,040	3,600	2,220	880	430

=== Prize pool ===
The total prize money is US$500,000 and will be distributed according to BWF regulations.

Event	Winner	Finalist	Semi-finals	Quarter-finals	Last 16
Singles	$37,500	$19,000	$7,250	$3,000	$1,750
Doubles	$39,500	$19,000	$7,000	$3,625	$1,875

== Men's singles ==
=== Seeds ===
1. (China) Shi Yuqi (withdrew)
2. (Denmark) Anders Antonsen (withdrew)
3. (France) Christo Popov (semi-finals)
4. (Indonesia) Jonatan Christie (quarter-finals)
5. (China) Li Shifeng (champion)
6. (Japan) Kodai Naraoka (second round)
7. (France) Alex Lanier (second round)
8. (India) Lakshya Sen (first round)

=== Finals ===
Semi-finals
Q3	(China) Hu Zhe'an	17	16
5	(China) Li Shifeng	21	21
(Thailand) Panitchaphon Teeraratsakul	21	21
3	(France) Christo Popov	13	13

Final
5	(China) Li Shifeng	21	21
(Thailand) Panitchaphon Teeraratsakul	16	17

=== Top half ===
==== Section 1 ====
First round
4	(Indonesia) J Christie	21	21
(Denmark) M Johannesen	9	15
PFQ	(Chinese Taipei) Wang P-w	17	21	21
(India) T Mannepalli	21	14	8
7	(France) A Lanier	21	6
(India) K George	15	1^{r}
(Malaysia) Leong J H	19	21
Q3	(China) Hu ZA	21	23

Second round
4	(Indonesia) J Christie	21	19	21
PFQ	(Chinese Taipei) Wang P-w	16	21	13
7	(France) A Lanier	21	16	15
Q3	(China) Hu ZA	15	21	21

Quarter-finals
4	(Indonesia) J Christie	21	13	16
Q3	(China) Hu ZA	14	21	21

==== Section 2 ====
First round
5	(China) Li SF	17	22	21
Q4	(Japan) M Koga	21	20	15
(Japan) Y Okimoto	24	21
(Chinese Taipei) Lee C-h	22	6
SWM	(France) T J Popov	21	21
(Hong Kong) Ng K L	16	15
Q2	(China) Zhu XC	21	22
(Canada) B Yang	18	20

Second round
5	(China) Li SF	21	21
(Japan) Y Okimoto	14	9
SWM	(France) T J Popov	23	14	21
Q2	(China) Zhu XC	21	21	11

Quarter-finals
5	(China) Li SF	21	15	21
SWM	(France) T J Popov	18	21	5

=== Bottom half ===
==== Section 3 ====
First round
Q1	(South Korea) Yoo T-b	21	12
(Thailand) Pan Teeraratsakul	23	21
(Chinese Taipei) Wang T-w	21	19	21
SWM	(China) Weng HY	17	21	18
(Hong Kong) J Gunawan	17	21	18
(China) Lu GZ	21	17	21
(India) Prannoy H.S.	17	22	22
6	(Japan) K Naraoka	21	20	24

Second round
(Thailand) Pan Teeraratsakul	17	21	21
(Chinese Taipei) Wang T-w	21	17	12
(China) Lu GZ	21	21
6	(Japan) K Naraoka	7	19

Quarter-finals
(Thailand) Pan Teeraratsakul	21	21
(China) Lu GZ	15	18

==== Section 4 ====
First round
(Indonesia) P B Shujiwo	15	19
(South Korea) Jeon H-j	21	21
(Indonesia) Z Ubaidillah	21	21
8	(India) L Sen	17	11
PFQ	(Indonesia) A S Ginting	21	21
(Malaysia) J Hoh	16	14
(Japan) K Watanabe	21	22	16
3	(France) C Popov	14	24	21

Second round
(South Korea) Jeon H-j	10	21	16
(Indonesia) Z Ubaidillah	21	16	21
PFQ	(Indonesia) A S Ginting	17	14
3	(France) C Popov	21	21

Quarter-finals
(Indonesia) Z Ubaidillah	21	19
3	(France) C Popov	23	21

== Women's singles ==
=== Seeds ===
1. (China) Chen Yufei (final)
2. (Thailand) Ratchanok Intanon (champion)
3. (Japan) Tomoka Miyazaki (second round)
4. (Thailand) Busanan Ongbamrungphan (first round)
5. (Denmark) Line Christophersen (quarter-finals)
6. (India) Unnati Hooda (withdrew)
7. (Vietnam) Nguyễn Thùy Linh (second round)
8. (Denmark) Line Kjærsfeldt (semi-finals)

=== Finals ===
Semi-finals
1	(China) Chen Yufei	21	21
(Japan) Hina Akechi	11	14
8	(Denmark) Line Kjærsfeldt	12	12
2	(Thailand) Ratchanok Intanon	21	21

Final
1	(China) Chen Yufei	17	15
2	(Thailand) Ratchanok Intanon	21	21

=== Top half ===
==== Section 1 ====
First round
1	(China) Chen YF	21	21
(Canada) W Y Zhang	14	13
Q2	(South Korea) Park G-e	21	18	19
(India) D Sihag	19	21	21
7	(Vietnam) Nguyễn T L	12	21	25
(Malaysia) Wong L C	21	13	23
(Thailand) P Opatniputh	21	21
(India) T Sharma	10	19

Second round
1	(China) Chen YF	21	21
(India) D Sihag	16	13
7	(Vietnam) Nguyễn T L	18	10
(Thailand) P Opatniputh	21	21

Quarter-finals
1	(China) Chen YF	21	21
(Thailand) P Opatniputh	19	9

==== Section 2 ====
First round
3	(Japan) T Miyazaki	21	21
(Chinese Taipei) Tung C-t	16	16
(Malaysia) L Karupathevan	21	19	21
(Denmark) A Schulz	13	21	15
SWM	(Japan) N Nidaira	22	13
(China) Han QX	24	21
(Japan) H Akechi	21	21
(Ukraine) P Buhrova	10	7

Second round
3	(Japan) T Miyazaki	15	17
(Malaysia) L Karupathevan	21	21
(China) Han QX	16	17
(Japan) H Akechi	21	21

Quarter-finals
(Malaysia) L Karupathevan	21	12	10
(Japan) H Akechi	19	21	21

=== Bottom half ===
==== Section 3 ====
First round
(India) M Bansod	21	16	21
(Germany) Y Li	17	21	9
(India) A Kharb	21	16	19
8	(Denmark) L Kjærsfeldt	13	21	21
Q4	(India) A Chaliha	21	21
Q3	(Indonesia) T R Wiryawan	16	13
(Malaysia) Goh J W	21	16	21
4	(Thailand) B Ongbamrungphan	6	21	10

Second round
(India) M Bansod	21	8	15
8	(Denmark) L Kjærsfeldt	16	21	21
Q4	(India) A Chaliha	21	21
(Malaysia) Goh J W	13	16

Quarter-finals
8	(Denmark) L Kjærsfeldt	21	21	21
Q4	(India) A Chaliha	23	18	11

==== Section 4 ====
First round
PFQ	(Chinese Taipei) Huang C-p	21	21
PFQ	(India) T Hemanth	19	7
(India) I Baruah	17	21	18
5	(Denmark) L Christophersen	21	14	21
(Bulgaria) K Nalbantova	21	21
(Turkey) N Arın	13	6
Q1	(Indonesia) N K D A Pratiwi	16	16
2	(Thailand) R Intanon	21	21

Second round
PFQ	(Chinese Taipei) Huang C-p	13	12
5	(Denmark) L Christophersen	21	21
(Bulgaria) K Nalbantova	15	11
2	(Thailand) R Intanon	21	21

Quarter-finals
5	(Denmark) L Christophersen	16	11
2	(Thailand) R Intanon	21	21

== Men's doubles ==
=== Seeds ===
1. (Malaysia) Aaron Chia / Soh Wooi Yik (semi-finals)
2. (Japan) Takuro Hoki / Yugo Kobayashi (quarter-finals)
3. (Malaysia) Goh Sze Fei / Nur Izzuddin (final)
4. (Chinese Taipei) Lee Jhe-huei / Yang Po-hsuan (first round)
5. (Malaysia) Junaidi Arif / Yap Roy King (semi-finals)
6. (Denmark) Mads Vestergaard / Daniel Lundgaard (champions)
7. (France) Christo Popov / Toma Junior Popov (first round)
8. (Japan) Kakeru Kumagai / Hiroki Nishi (quarter-finals)

=== Finals ===
Semi-finals
1	(Malaysia) Aaron Chia (Malaysia) Soh Wooi Yik	18	12
3	(Malaysia) Goh Sze Fei (Malaysia) Nur Izzuddin	21	21
5	(Malaysia) Junaidi Arif (Malaysia) Yap Roy King	19	17
6	(Denmark) Daniel Lundgaard (Denmark) Mads Vestergaard	21	21

Final
3	(Malaysia) Goh Sze Fei (Malaysia) Nur Izzuddin	16	17
6	(Denmark) Daniel Lundgaard (Denmark) Mads Vestergaard	21	21

=== Top half ===
==== Section 1 ====
First round
1	(Malaysia) A Chia (Malaysia) Soh W Y	19	21	21
(Singapore) W Koh (Singapore) J Kubo	21	10	12
Q4	(France) J Maio (France) W Villeger	21	21
Q1	(Scotland) C Grimley (Scotland) M Grimley	12	15
7	(France) C Popov (France) T J Popov	19	15
(India) H Amsakarunan (India) Arjun M. R.	21	21
(Indonesia) L R Carnando (Indonesia) D Marthin	19	21	15
(China) Hu KY (China) Lin XY	21	13	21

Second round
1	(Malaysia) A Chia (Malaysia) Soh W Y	21	21
Q4	(France) J Maio (France) W Villeger	12	10
(India) H Amsakarunan (India) Arjun M. R.	14	15
(China) Hu KY (China) Lin XY	21	21

Quarter-finals
1	(Malaysia) A Chia (Malaysia) Soh W Y	21	21
(China) Hu KY (China) Lin XY	15	16

==== Section 2 ====
First round
3	(Malaysia) Goh S F (Malaysia) N Izzuddin	21	21
(Indonesia) P Erwiansyah (Indonesia) B Maulana	16	14
(Canada) K Lee (Canada) T A Lindeman	18	15
(Malaysia) Chia W J (Malaysia) Teo E Y	21	21
8	(Japan) K Kumagai (Japan) H Nishi	21	21
Q3	(Malaysia) Low H Y (Malaysia) Ng E C	9	13
(Malaysia) Lwi S H (Malaysia) Ong Y S	13	14
(Chinese Taipei) Chen Z-r (Chinese Taipei) Lin Y-c	21	21

Second round
3	(Malaysia) Goh S F (Malaysia) N Izzuddin	21	21
(Malaysia) Chia W J (Malaysia) Teo E Y	14	12
8	(Japan) K Kumagai (Japan) H Nishi	21	21
(Chinese Taipei) Chen Z-r (Chinese Taipei) Lin Y-c	13	10

Quarter-finals
3	(Malaysia) Goh S F (Malaysia) N Izzuddin	21	16	21
8	(Japan) K Kumagai (Japan) H Nishi	17	21	16

=== Bottom half ===
==== Section 3 ====
First round
(Chinese Taipei) Lai P-y (Chinese Taipei) Tsai F-c	21	19	16
(Malaysia) Kang K X (Malaysia) A Tai	17	21	21
(Chinese Taipei) He Z-w (Chinese Taipei) Huang J-h	19	21	11
5	(Malaysia) J Arif (Malaysia) Yap R K	21	15	21
(United States) Chen Z-y (United States) P Smith	21	12	21
(Czech Republic) J Král (Czech Republic) O Král	15	21	13
(Malaysia) N M Azriyn A (Malaysia) Tan W K	21	21
4	(Chinese Taipei) Lee J-h (Chinese Taipei) Yang P-h	14	14

Second round
(Malaysia) Kang K X (Malaysia) A Tai	12	20
5	(Malaysia) J Arif (Malaysia) Yap R K	21	22
(United States) Chen Z-y (United States) P Smith	21	21
(Malaysia) N M Azriyn A (Malaysia) Tan W K	14	18

Quarter-finals
5	(Malaysia) J Arif (Malaysia) Yap R K	21	21
(United States) Chen Z-y (United States) P Smith	15	19

==== Section 4 ====
First round
(China) Huang D (China) Liu Y	22	21
(Chinese Taipei) Chen C-k (Chinese Taipei) Liu K-h	20	11
Q2	(Thailand) P Sukphun (Thailand) Pak Teeraratsakul	17	14
6	(Denmark) D Lundgaard (Denmark) M Vestergaard	21	21
(China) Xie HN (China) Zeng WH	21	21
PFQ	(Thailand) C Charoenkitamorn (Thailand) W Thongsa-nga	13	9
(Indonesia) M R Ardianto (Indonesia) R Hidayat	18	18
2	(Japan) T Hoki (Japan) Y Kobayashi	21	21

Second round
(China) Huang D (China) Liu Y	15	21	16
6	(Denmark) D Lundgaard (Denmark) M Vestergaard	21	18	21
(China) Xie HN (China) Zeng WH	15	18
2	(Japan) T Hoki (Japan) Y Kobayashi	21	21

Quarter-finals
6	(Denmark) D Lundgaard (Denmark) M Vestergaard	21	21
2	(Japan) T Hoki (Japan) Y Kobayashi	18	14

== Women's doubles ==
=== Seeds ===
1. (Malaysia) Pearly Tan / Thinaah Muralitharan (withdrew)
2. (Japan) Rin Iwanaga / Kie Nakanishi (quarter-finals)
3. (Chinese Taipei) Hsu Ya-ching / Sung Yu-hsuan (first round)
4. (Japan) Kaho Osawa / Mai Tanabe (first round)
5. (Japan) Arisa Igarashi / Chiharu Shida (second round)
6. (China) Chen Fanshutian / Luo Xumin (champions)
7. (Malaysia) Ong Xin Yee / Carmen Ting (first round)
8. (United States) Lauren Lam / Allison Lee (semi-finals)

=== Finals ===
Semi-finals
PFQ	(Japan) Sayaka Hirota (Japan) Ayako Sakuramoto	21	17	21
8	(United States) Lauren Lam (United States) Allison Lee	15	21	11
(China) Bao Lijing (China) Cao Zihan	21	9	19
6	(China) Chen Fanshutian (China) Luo Xumin	18	21	21

Final
PFQ	(Japan) Sayaka Hirota (Japan) Ayako Sakuramoto	16	23
6	(China) Chen Fanshutian (China) Luo Xumin	21	25

=== Top half ===
==== Section 1 ====
First round
4	(Japan) K Osawa (Japan) M Tanabe	17	19
Q3	(Thailand) O Jongsathapornparn (Thailand) S S Wedler	21	21
(United States) F Corbett (United States) J Gai	21	21
Q2	(England) Lam C W (Malaysia) Sim J M	8	3
5	(Japan) A Igarashi (Japan) C Shida	21	21
Q4	(Malaysia) Cheng S H (Malaysia) Tan Z H	8	12
PFQ	(Japan) S Hirota (Japan) A Sakuramoto	21	21
(Spain) P López (Spain) L Rodríguez	5	17

Second round
Q3	(Thailand) O Jongsathapornparn (Thailand) S S Wedler	21	11	25
(United States) F Corbett (United States) J Gai	16	21	23
5	(Japan) A Igarashi (Japan) C Shida	13	21	14
PFQ	(Japan) S Hirota (Japan) A Sakuramoto	21	19	21

Quarter-finals
Q3	(Thailand) O Jongsathapornparn (Thailand) S S Wedler	11	12
PFQ	(Japan) S Hirota (Japan) A Sakuramoto	21	21

==== Section 2 ====
First round
8	(United States) L Lam (United States) A Lee	21	21
(Australia) C Griselda (Australia) N Shimizu	9	14
(India) Ashwini B (India) S Gautam	15	21	17
(Canada) J Dent (Canada) C Lai	21	17	21
SWM	(Turkey) B Erçetin (Turkey) N İnci	8	15
(China) Luo Y (China) Wang TG	21	21
(Chinese Taipei) Lin C-c (Chinese Taipei) Yang C-y	21	21
(Thailand) P Aiamvareesrisakul (Thailand) S Janpeng	19	16

Second round
8	(United States) L Lam (United States) A Lee	21	21
(Canada) J Dent (Canada) C Lai	8	8
(China) Luo Y (China) Wang TG	21	23
(Chinese Taipei) Lin C-c (Chinese Taipei) Yang C-y	12	21

Quarter-finals
8	(United States) L Lam (United States) A Lee	20	21	21
(China) Luo Y (China) Wang TG	22	19	17

=== Bottom half ===
==== Section 3 ====
First round
(Malaysia) Chong J Y (Malaysia) V Ng	16	17
(Chinese Taipei) Chen Y-f (Chinese Taipei) Sun L-c	21	21
(Chinese Taipei) Hsieh Y-e (Chinese Taipei) Teng C-h	21	22
7	(Malaysia) Ong X Y (Malaysia) C Ting	15	20
(China) Bao LJ (China) Cao ZH	21	21
Q1	(Malaysia) Low Z Y (Malaysia) N Maisarah	18	12
(Thailand) H Mijad (Thailand) N Tungkasatan	21	21
3	(Chinese Taipei) Hsu Y-c (Chinese Taipei) Sung Y-h	10	13

Second round
(Chinese Taipei) Chen Y-f (Chinese Taipei) Sun L-c	21	16	21
(Chinese Taipei) Hsieh Y-e (Chinese Taipei) Teng C-h	17	21	16
(China) Bao LJ (China) Cao ZH	21	15	21
(Thailand) H Mijad (Thailand) N Tungkasatan	19	21	10

Quarter-finals
(Chinese Taipei) Chen Y-f (Chinese Taipei) Sun L-c	14	21	15
(China) Bao LJ (China) Cao ZH	21	18	21

==== Section 4 ====
First round
(Indonesia) I S Meida (Indonesia) R K Nastine	20	21	17
(Indonesia) L T Mayasari (Indonesia) A Rahayu	22	19	21
(Ukraine) P Buhrova (Ukraine) Y Kantemyr	9	15
6	(China) Chen FST (China) Luo XM	21	21
(Hong Kong) Fan K Y (Hong Kong) Yau M Y	21	21
(Scotland) J MacPherson (Scotland) C Torrance	11	13
(India) R Panda (India) S Panda	7	6
2	(Japan) R Iwanaga (Japan) K Nakanishi	21	21

Second round
(Indonesia) L T Mayasari (Indonesia) A Rahayu	10	21	17
6	(China) Chen FST (China) Luo XM	21	15	21
(Hong Kong) Fan K Y (Hong Kong) Yau M Y	14	9
2	(Japan) R Iwanaga (Japan) K Nakanishi	21	21

Quarter-finals
6	(China) Chen FST (China) Luo XM	24	21
2	(Japan) R Iwanaga (Japan) K Nakanishi	22	18

== Mixed doubles ==
=== Seeds ===
1. (Thailand) Dechapol Puavaranukroh / Supissara Paewsampran (first round)
2. (Malaysia) Chen Tang Jie / Toh Ee Wei (quarter-finals)
3. (China) Guo Xinwa / Chen Fanghui (semi-finals)
4. (Denmark) Mathias Christiansen / Alexandra Bøje (semi-finals)
5. (Indonesia) Jafar Hidayatullah / Felisha Pasaribu (first round)
6. (Malaysia) Goh Soon Huat / Shevon Jemie Lai (second round)
7. (China) Cheng Xing / Zhang Chi (second round)
8. (China) Gao Jiaxuan / Wei Yaxin (champions)

=== Finals ===
Semi-finals
(Thailand) Pakkapon Teeraratsakul (Thailand) Sapsiree Taerattanachai	15	21	21
3	(China) Guo Xinwa (China) Chen Fanghui	21	15	17
4	(Denmark) Mathias Christiansen (Denmark) Alexandra Bøje	24	16	18
8	(China) Gao Jiaxuan (China) Wei Yaxin	22	21	21

Final
(Thailand) Pakkapon Teeraratsakul (Thailand) Sapsiree Taerattanachai	13	21	11
8	(China) Gao Jiaxuan (China) Wei Yaxin	21	15	21

=== Top half ===
==== Section 1 ====
First round
1	(Thailand) D Puavaranukroh (Thailand) S Paewsampran	11^{r}
(Thailand) Pak Teeraratsakul (Thailand) S Taerattanachai	5
(India) A Surya (India) A Pramuthesh	13	18
(Indonesia) B Setiabudi (Indonesia) M D Oktavianti	21	21
7	(China) Cheng X (China) Zhang C	13	21	21
(Malaysia) Hoo P R (Malaysia) Lai P J	21	12	16
(Malaysia) Wong T C (Malaysia) Lim C S	14	19
Q1	(Hong Kong) Chan Y C (Hong Kong) Ng T Y	21	21

Second round
(Thailand) Pak Teeraratsakul (Thailand) S Taerattanachai	18	21	21
(Indonesia) B Setiabudi (Indonesia) M D Oktavianti	21	18	16
7	(China) Cheng X (China) Zhang C	9	17
Q1	(Hong Kong) Chan Y C (Hong Kong) Ng T Y	21	21

Quarter-finals
(Thailand) Pak Teeraratsakul (Thailand) S Taerattanachai	23	21
Q1	(Hong Kong) Chan Y C (Hong Kong) Ng T Y	21	19

==== Section 2 ====
First round
3	(China) Guo XW (China) Chen FH	21	12	22
(Japan) A Koga (Japan) N Saito	19	21	20
(Germany) M Seidel (Germany) Nguyen T P	11	21	19
(China) Zhu YJ (China) Li Q	21	13	21
5	(Indonesia) J Hidayatullah (Indonesia) F Pasaribu	19	21	19
(United States) P Smith (United States) J Gai	21	12	21
Q3	(India) S R Kanapuram (India) R Sharma	16	21	21
(Scotland) A Dunn (Scotland) J MacPherson	21	14	18

Second round
3	(China) Guo XW (China) Chen FH	21	22
(China) Zhu YJ (China) Li Q	17	20
(United States) P Smith (United States) J Gai	21	27
Q3	(India) S R Kanapuram (India) R Sharma	12	25

Quarter-finals
3	(China) Guo XW (China) Chen FH	23	22
(United States) P Smith (United States) J Gai	21	20

=== Bottom half ===
==== Section 3 ====
First round
(Chinese Taipei) Wu G-x (Chinese Taipei) Lee C-h	20	21	21
Q4	(Chinese Taipei) Wu H-y (Chinese Taipei) Yang C-y	22	13	17
(United States) Chen Z-y (United States) F Corbett	8	16
6	(Malaysia) Goh S H (Malaysia) S J Lai	21	21
(Spain) R García (Spain) L Rodríguez	15	13
(Indonesia) A Maulana (Indonesia) I C S Jamil	21	21
(Malaysia) J Wong (Malaysia) Cheng S Y	13	15
4	(Denmark) M Christiansen (Denmark) A Bøje	21	21

Second round
(Chinese Taipei) Wu G-x (Chinese Taipei) Lee C-h	21	7	21
6	(Malaysia) Goh S H (Malaysia) S J Lai	19	21	19
(Indonesia) A Maulana (Indonesia) I C S Jamil	21	10	13
4	(Denmark) M Christiansen (Denmark) A Bøje	13	21	21

Quarter-finals
(Chinese Taipei) Wu G-x (Chinese Taipei) Lee C-h	17	14
4	(Denmark) M Christiansen (Denmark) A Bøje	21	21

==== Section 4 ====
First round
Q2	(Thailand) S Jomkoh (Thailand) O Jongsathapornparn	12	21	21
(France) J Maio (France) L Palermo	21	18	12
(Indonesia) D Ferdinansyah (Indonesia) B Wardana	19	19
8	(China) Gao JX (China) Wei YX	21	21
(Indonesia) A Syahnawi (Indonesia) N V Marwah	21	20	21
(India) R Kapoor (India) R Gadde	15	22	10
(Canada) J Lai (Canada) C Lai	6	14
2	(Malaysia) Chen T J (Malaysia) Toh E W	21	21

Second round
Q2	(Thailand) S Jomkoh (Thailand) O Jongsathapornparn	13	13
8	(China) Gao JX (China) Wei YX	21	21
(Indonesia) A Syahnawi (Indonesia) N V Marwah	19	20
2	(Malaysia) Chen T J (Malaysia) Toh E W	21	22

Quarter-finals
8	(China) Gao JX (China) Wei YX	21	21
2	(Malaysia) Chen T J (Malaysia) Toh E W	18	16

Preceded by 2026 Thailand Open; 2026 Baoji China Masters	BWF World Tour; 2026 BWF season	Succeeded by 2026 Singapore Open
