= 2022 BWF World Junior Championships – Girls' singles =

Tournament details
- Dates: 24 October 2022 – 30 October 2022
- Edition: 22nd
- Level: International
- Venue: Palacio de Deportes de Santander
- Location: Santander, Spain

The girls' singles of the tournament 2022 BWF World Junior Championships is an individual badminton tournament to crowned the best girls' singles under 19 player across the BWF associate members around the world. Players will compete to win the Eye Level Cup presented by the former BWF President and chairman of the World Youth Culture Foundation, Kang Young Joong. The tournament will be held from 24 to 30 October 2022 in the Palacio de Deportes de Santander, Spain. The defending champion was Riko Gunji from Japan, but she was not eligible to participate this year.

== Seeds ==
Click on the seed number of a player to go to their draw section.

1. (India) Anupama Upadhyaya (third round)
2. (Thailand) Sirada Roongpiboonsopit (fourth round)
3. (Indonesia) Ester Nurumi Tri Wardoyo (semi-finals)
4. (Ukraine) Polina Buhrova (third round)
5. (India) Unnati Hooda (fourth round)
6. (Spain) Lucía Rodríguez (second round)
7. (Indonesia) Tasya Farahnailah (fourth round)
8. (England) Lisa Curtin (second round)

9. (Thailand) Pitchamon Opatniputh (quarter-finals)
10. (France) Émilie Drouin (second round)
11. (Switzerland) Lucie Amiguet (third round)
12. (Bulgaria) Kaloyana Nalbantova (second round)
13. (Republic of Ireland) Sophia Noble (third round)
14. (Czech Republic) Petra Maixnerová (first round)
15. (Denmark) Benedicte Sillassen (first round)
16. (Czech Republic) Lucie Krulová (second round)

== Draw ==
=== Finals ===
Quarter-finals
(China) Zhang Xinran	16	16
(Japan) Sorano Yoshikawa	21	21
(Japan) Tomoka Miyazaki	21	26
9	(Thailand) Pitchamon Opatniputh	17	24
(Japan) Hina Akechi	19	21	16
3	(Indonesia) Ester Nurumi Tri Wardoyo	21	18	21
(China) Yuan Anqi	21	21
(United States) Ella Lin	19	6

Semi-finals
(Japan) Sorano Yoshikawa	16	19
(Japan) Tomoka Miyazaki	21	21
3	(Indonesia) Ester Nurumi Tri Wardoyo	21	15	11
(China) Yuan Anqi	17	21	21

Final
(Japan) Tomoka Miyazaki	21	20	21
(China) Yuan Anqi	14	22	17

=== Top half ===
==== Section 1 ====
First round
(Singapore) E Lai	21	21
(Iceland) H E Ingvarsdóttir	7	6
(Estonia) M Salu	8	11
(Chinese Taipei) Hsieh Y-s	21	21
(China) Zhang XR	21	21
(Slovenia) S Alič	10	3
(Sri Lanka) V Jayawardana	14	12
(India) R Ramraj	21	21
(South Korea) Park N-k	21	21
(Latvia) A Babre	13	6
(Norway) M Kragholm	21	18	21
(French Polynesia) M Gaillard	13	21	8

Second round
1	(India) A Upadhyaya	19	21	21
(Singapore) E Lai	21	10	9
(Chinese Taipei) Hsieh Y-s	11	10
(China) Zhang XR	21	21
16	(Czech Republic) L Krulová	16	12
(India) R Ramraj	21	21
(South Korea) Park N-k	21	21
(Norway) M Kragholm	6	2

Third round
1	(India) A Upadhyaya	15	10
(China) Zhang XR	21	21
(India) R Ramraj	13	13
(South Korea) Park N-k	21	21

Fourth round
(China) Zhang XR	21	17	21
(South Korea) Park N-k	12	21	11

==== Section 2 ====
First round
(Spain) C Teruel	19	21	21
(Slovakia) S Slosiariková	21	9	15
(Canada) C Hoang	20	9
(South Korea) Kim M-j	22	21
(Hong Kong) Liang K W	16	21	11
(United States) N Chi	21	19	21
10	(France) E Drouin	21	21
(Sri Lanka) P Adhikari	10	13
(Hong Kong) Chan W L	10	11
(Japan) S Yoshikawa	21	21
(Chinese Taipei) Ruo H-k	21	21
(Egypt) G Elwazery	8	6
(Switzerland) V Appenzeller	21	19	11
(Bulgaria) M Chepisheva	19	21	21

Second round
7	(Indonesia) T Farahnailah	21	21
(Spain) C Teruel	11	8
(South Korea) Kim M-j	21	21
(United States) N Chi	11	10
10	(France) E Drouin	15	10
(Japan) S Yoshikawa	21	21
(Chinese Taipei) Ko R-h	21	21
(Bulgaria) M Chepisheva	9	10

Third round
7	(Indonesia) T Farahnailah	21	21
(South Korea) Kim M-j	18	19
(Japan) S Yoshikawa	21	21
(Chinese Taipei) Ko R-h	14	11

Fourth round
7	(Indonesia) T Farahnailah	18	14
(Japan) S Yoshikawa	21	21

==== Section 3 ====
First round
(South Korea) Park S	21	21
(Estonia) E Berik	13	12
(Georgia (country)) M Ovasapyan	1	2
(China) Sun Z C	21	21
(Spain) N Carulla	21	21
(Armenia) S Boyajyan	6	4
(Ukraine) Y Kantemyr	21	21
(Portugal) B Roberto	12	17
(Japan) T Miyazaki	21	21
(Belgium) K Henry	10	11
(Denmark) F Østergaard	24	21
(Canada) S Nong	22	11

Second round
4	(Ukraine) P Buhrova	21	21
(South Korea) Park S	13	15
(China) Sun Z C	21	21
(Spain) N Carulla	10	8
13	(Republic of Ireland) S Noble	21	18	21
(Ukraine) Y Kantemyr	17	21	12
(Japan) T Miyazaki	21	21
(Denmark) F Østergaard	17	13

Third round
4	(Ukraine) P Buhrova	18	20
(China) Sun Z C	21	22
13	(Republic of Ireland) S Noble	8	7
(Japan) T Miyazaki	21	21

Fourth round
(China) Sun Z C	16	21	13
(Japan) T Miyazaki	21	11	21

==== Section 4 ====
First round
(Hungary) T Takács	9	6
(Thailand) S Vitidsarn	21	21
(Peru) R Munar	17	21
(Germany) A Schaller	21	23
(Finland) N Nyqvist	21	21
(Peru) F Munar	13	14
9	(Thailand) P Opatniputh	21	21
(Netherlands) F Wang	8	10
(Australia) S Go	18	17
(Sweden) E Ohling	21	21
(Germany) C Winnefeld	18	13
(Malaysia) S Zulaikha	21	21
(Georgia (country)) E Zumbulidze	5	4
(Malaysia) S Nurshuhaini	21	21

Second round
8	(England) L Curtin	10	17
(Thailand) S Vitidsarn	21	21
(Germany) A Schaller	11	21	8
(Finland) N Nyqvist	21	9	21
9	(Thailand) P Opatniputh	21	21
(Sweden) E Ohling	17	9
(Malaysia) S Zulaikha	15	22
(Malaysia) S Nurshuhaini	21	24

Third round
(Thailand) S Vitidsarn	21	21
(Finland) N Nyqvist	12	11
9	(Thailand) P Opatniputh	19	21	21
(Malaysia) S Nurshuhaini	21	10	10

Fourth round
(Thailand) S Vitidsarn	14	15
9	(Thailand) P Opatniputh	21	21

=== Bottom half ===
==== Section 5 ====
First round
(South Korea) Kim M-s	21	21
(Norway) K Ødegårdstuen	6	4
(Egypt) J Abdelkader	15	11
(Singapore) Li ZH	21	21
(Republic of Ireland) S Flynn	7	20
(Hungary) P Hart	21	22
(Japan) H Akechi	21	21
15	(Denmark) B Sillassen	16	14
(Australia) Y Zhang	11	14
(Italy) G Stiglich	21	21
(Hong Kong) A Liu H K	21	21
(Australia) C Tan	18	16
(Sri Lanka) R Liyanage	21	21
(Peru) N Miyahira	4	14

Second round
(South Korea) Kim M-s	21	21
(Singapore) Li ZH	8	6
(Hungary) P Hart	8	3
(Japan) H Akechi	21	21
(Italy) G Stiglich	21	12	21
(Hong Kong) A Liu H K	12	21	18
(Sri Lanka) R Liyanage	11	21	7
5	(India) U Hooda	21	19	21

Third round
(South Korea) Kim M-s	17	9
(Japan) H Akechi	21	21
(Italy) G Stiglich	11	7
5	(India) U Hooda	21	21

Fourth round
(Japan) H Akechi	21	12	21
5	(India) U Hooda	17	21	18

==== Section 6 ====
First round
(Thailand) T Nithiittikrai	21	21
(Poland) J Podedworny	6	5
(French Polynesia) H Curet	9	19
(Norway) K Ellingsen	21	21
(Japan) M Endo	21	21
(Hong Kong) Chan W L	13	17
(Chinese Taipei) Wang P-y	21	21
14	(Czech Republic) P Maixnerová	17	9
(Slovenia) N Bedič	16	16
(Slovakia) L Výbochová	21	21
(Estonia) E Pärsim	18	15
(Latvia) A Kupča	21	21
(France) M Hoareau	14	16
(Indonesia) D H Nurtertiati	21	21

Second round
(Thailand) T Nithiittikrai	21	21
(Norway) K Ellingsen	6	13
(Japan) M Endo	21	28	21
(Chinese Taipei) Wang P-y	17	30	13
(Slovakia) L Výbochová	10	19
(Latvia) A Kupča	21	21
(Indonesia) D H Nurtertiati	10	11
3	(Indonesia) E N T Wardoyo	21	21

Third round
(Thailand) T Nithiittikrai	18	21	19
(Japan) M Endo	21	12	21
(Latvia) A Kupča	5	4
3	(Indonesia) E N T Wardoyo	21	21

Fourth round
(Japan) M Endo	13	16
3	(Indonesia) E N T Wardoyo	21	21

==== Section 7 ====
First round
(China) Yuan A Q	21	21
(Denmark) L Hvid	13	11
(United States) V Yang	21	14	21
(England) L Lee	15	21	19
(Finland) P Saarnivaara	10	8
(Singapore) M Lee	21	21
(Armenia) L Smbatyan	8	12
12	(Bulgaria) K Nalbantova	21	21
(Indonesia) M A Puspitasari	21	21
(Belgium) A Boonen	11	11
(Portugal) M Cabaço	14	11
(Sweden) E Ryberg	21	21
(Malaysia) Ong X Y	21	15	21
(Ukraine) S Lavrova	11	21	18

Second round
(China) Yuan A Q	21	21
(United States) V Yang	10	9
(Singapore) M Lee	15	27	21
12	(Bulgaria) K Nalbantova	21	25	18
(Indonesia) M A Puspitasari	21	21
(Sweden) E Ryberg	19	18
(Malaysia) Ong X Y	21	21
6	(Spain) L Rodríguez	17	12

Third round
(China) Yuan A Q	21	21
(Singapore) M Lee	12	7
(Indonesia) M A Puspitasari	21	21
(Malaysia) Ong X Y	17	15

Fourth round
(China) Yuan A Q	16	21	21
(Indonesia) M A Puspitasari	21	7	16

==== Section 8 ====
First round
(United States) E Lin	14	21	21
(China) Xu W J	21	12	18
(Sweden) K Harakamani	21	8	15
(Portugal) M Fortunato	19	21	21
(Iceland) L Bu	21	15	21
(Slovakia) O Kadlecová	18	21	16
(Latvia) A Rulle-Titava	4	11
(Germany) S Hübsch	21	21
(Egypt) R Hussien	0	3
(Canada) J Dent	21	21
(French Polynesia) J Lesourd	11	13
(Slovenia) A Jordan	21	21

Second round
(United States) E Lin	21	21
(Portugal) M Fortunato	12	15
(Iceland) L Bu	13	3
11	(Switzerland) L Amiguet	21	21
(Germany) S Hübsch	10	16
(Canada) J Dent	21	21
(Slovenia) A Jordan	12	7
2	(Thailand) S Roongpiboonsopit	21	21

Third round
(United States) E Lin	21	20	21
11	(Switzerland) L Amiguet	10	22	15
(Canada) J Dent	21	19	14
2	(Thailand) S Roongpiboonsopit	19	21	21

Fourth round
(United States) E Lin	21	15	21
2	(Thailand) S Roongpiboonsopit	11	21	15
