= Hina Akechi =

Japanese badminton player (born 2005)

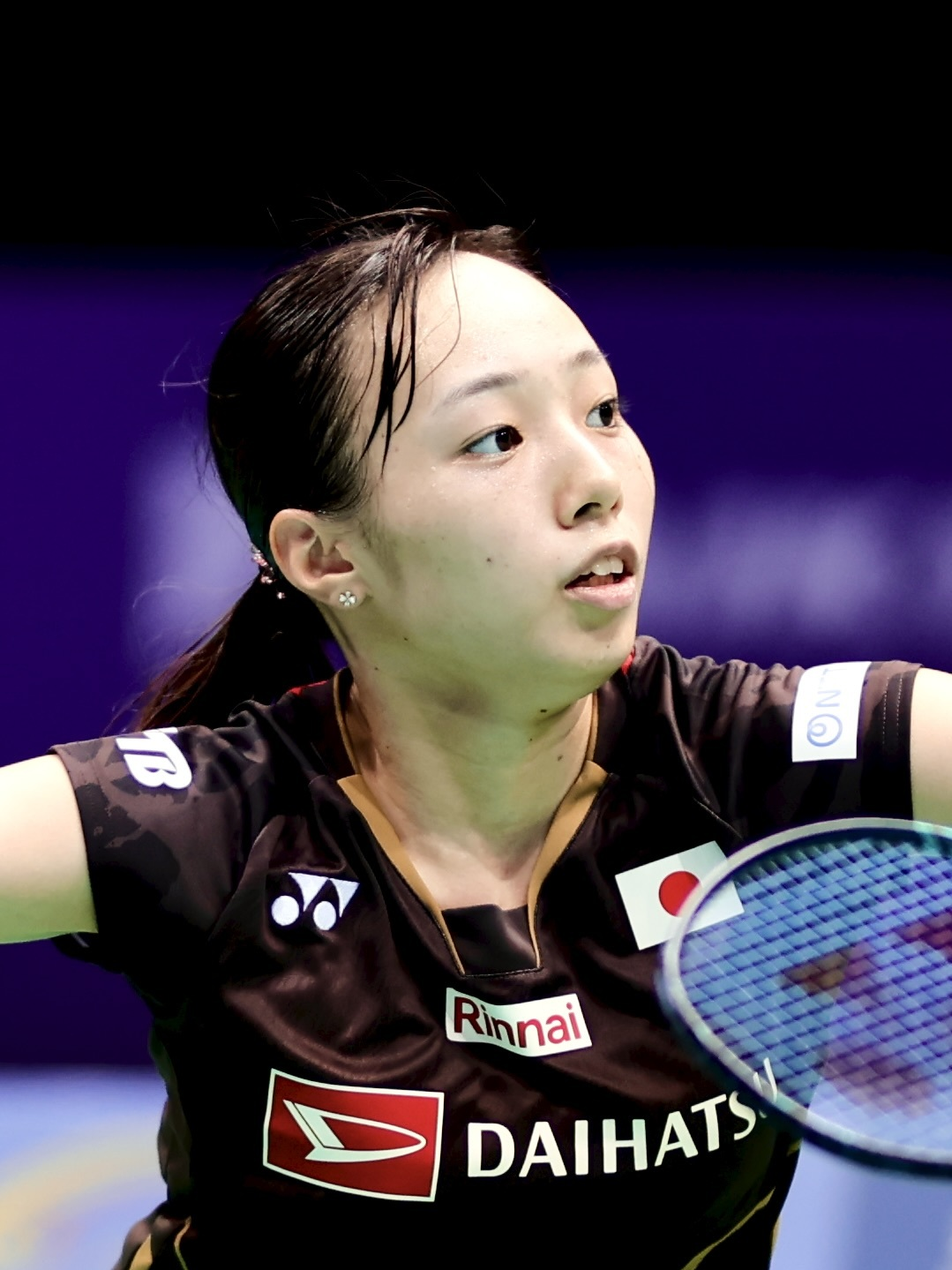
- Akechi in 2025

Personal information
- Native name: 明地 陽菜
- Born: 14 March 2005 (age 21) Sakai, Osaka Prefecture, Japan
- Height: 1.55 m (5 ft 1 in)

Sport
- Country: Japan
- Sport: Badminton
- Handedness: Left
- Coached by: Shōji Satō; Tatsuya Watanabe

Women's singles
- Career record: 159 wins, 47 losses (77.18%)
- Highest ranking: 14 (10 November 2026)
- Current ranking: 14 (10 November 2026)
- BWF profile
Medal record
Women's badminton
Representing Japan
Uber Cup
| Bronze medal – third place | 2026 Horsens | Women's team |
Asia Team Championships
| Bronze medal – third place | 2022 Selangor | Women's team |
World Junior Championships
| Bronze medal – third place | 2022 Santander | Mixed team |

Hina Akechi (明地 陽菜, Akechi Hina; born 14 March 2005) is a Japanese badminton player from Sakai, Osaka Prefecture. Competing in the women's singles event, she reached a career-high world ranking of No. 14. She is a member of the Japanese national team and plays for the Kumamoto Saishunkan badminton team.

A former world No. 1 in the BWF World Junior Rankings, she won the Asian Junior U-15 and U-17 championships in 2018 and 2019, respectively, and claimed three titles in girls' singles on the BWF junior circuit. She won her first BWF World Tour title at the Super 300 Syed Modi International in 2025 and has secured seven International Challenge/Series titles. In team events, she contributed to Japan securing bronze medals at the 2022 Asia Team Championships and the 2026 Uber Cup.

== Early career ==
Akechi began playing badminton at the age of six in her hometown of Osaka at the Uriwari Nishi SSC. She transferred from Kuze Junior High School in Osaka Prefecture to Yanai Junior High School in Yamaguchi Prefecture. She then attended Yanai Shoko High School, where she was part of a team that won four consecutive national team championships. At the 2021 National High School Championships (Inter-High), she won the doubles title and was a semifinalist in singles. In 2022, she won the singles title at the National High School Invitational Championships.

On the international junior circuit, Akechi won the U-15 Asia Junior Championships in 2018 and the U-17 title in 2019. In 2022, she won the Croatia and Bulgaria Junior Open tournaments. At the World Junior Championships that year, she earned a bronze medal in the mixed team event and reached the girls' singles quarterfinals. On 9 May 2023, she was ranked world number 1 in the BWF World Junior Rankings for girls' singles.

== Career ==
=== 2022–2024: Senior debut and first World Tour final ===
In February 2022, Akechi was part of the Japanese squad that secured a bronze medal at the Asia Team Championships. Later that year, she made her senior international debut at the Slovenia Future Series, where she won the women's doubles title partnering Sorano Yoshikawa and finished runner-up in women's singles to Tomoka Miyazaki.

After a runner-up finish at the Osaka International in March 2023, she joined the Kumamoto Saishunkan badminton team the following month. She claimed four international titles that season: the Luxembourg Open, the Swedish Open, the Mauritius International, and the Réunion Open. She also made her World Tour debut at the Indonesia Masters Super 100, where she advanced to the quarterfinals.

In 2024, Akechi reached her first World Tour final at the Super 300 Orléans Masters, finishing as runner-up to Miyazaki. Later that season, she defended her title at the Luxembourg Open, and won the Indonesia International. On the World Tour, she advanced to the semifinals of the U.S. Open and finished runner-up at the Indonesia Masters Super 100. She made her Super 500 debut at the Japan Masters in November, losing in the first round, and ended the season with a world ranking of 41.

=== 2025: First World Tour title ===
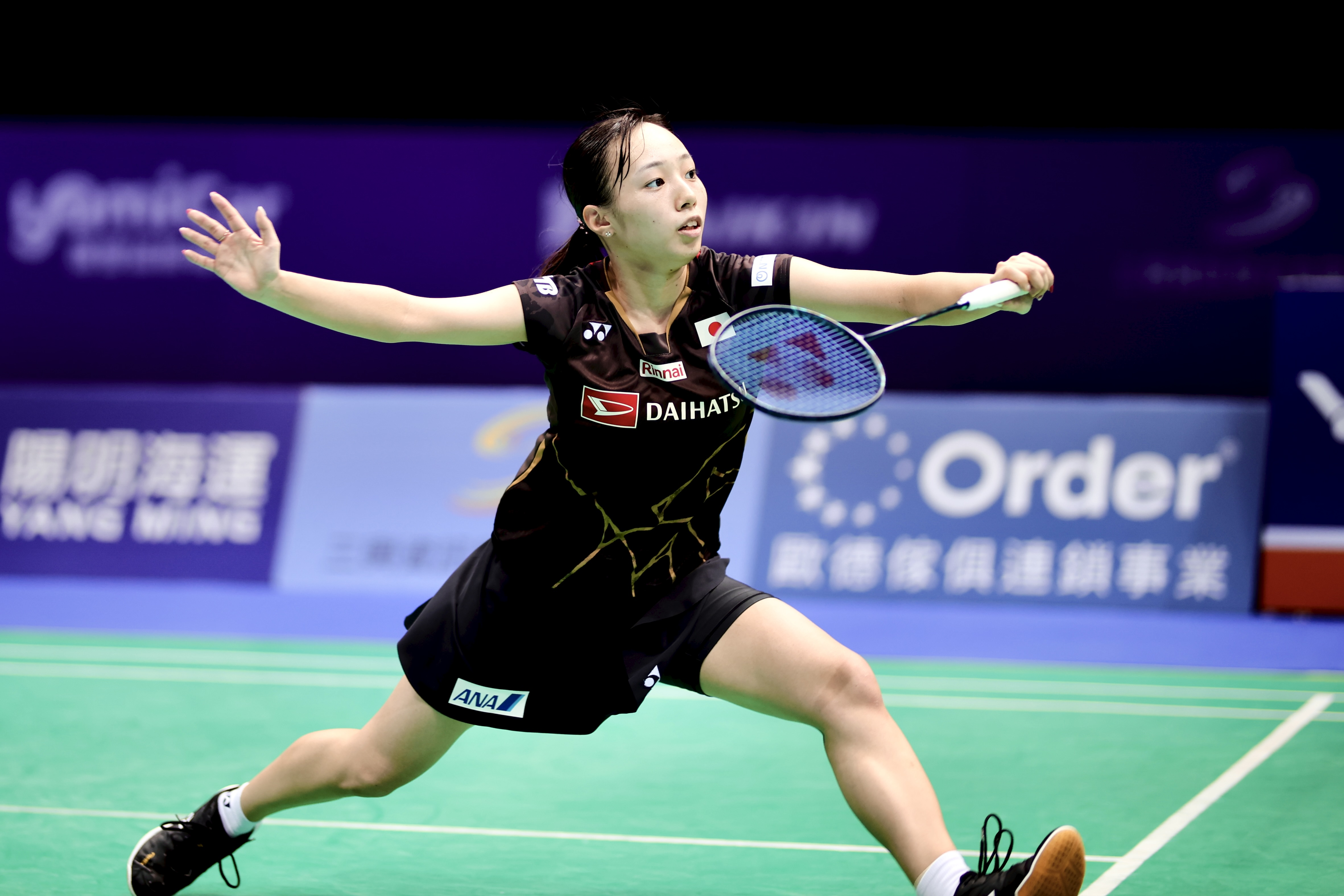
Akechi competing at the 2025 Kaohsiung Masters.

At the beginning of the 2025 season, Akechi was officially selected for Japan's senior national team. She began the year by reaching the quarterfinals of the German Open, followed by a first-round defeat against Chen Yufei at the Orléans Masters. She later advanced to the final of the Kaohsiung Masters, finishing as the runner-up to Nozomi Okuhara, and reached the semifinals at the Malaysia Super 100 and Korea Masters. In November, Akechi won her maiden World Tour title at the Super 300 Syed Modi International, defeating Neslihan Arın in straight games. By the end of the year, her world ranking had risen to 34.

=== 2026: World's top 20 ===
Akechi opened the 2026 season with a first-round loss to Miyazaki at the India Open and a quarterfinal appearance at the Thailand Masters. In February, she represented Japan at the Asia Team Championships, where the women's team finished in fifth place. She made her Super 1000 debut at the All England Open in March, exiting in the first round against eventual champion Wang Zhiyi.

In May, Akechi represented Japan at the Uber Cup in Horsens, where she contributed to the team securing a bronze medal. She then reached consecutive Super 500 semifinals: at the Thailand Open, she defeated third-seeded Ratchanok Intanon in the quarterfinals before losing to Chen Yufei, and she lost to Chen again in the semifinals of the Malaysia Masters.

In October, she reached the semifinals of the Super 750 French Open, her best result at that level, defeating second-seeded Wang Zhiyi in the second round and Putri Kusuma Wardani in the quarterfinals before losing to P. V. Sindhu. These results lifted her to a career-high ranking of No. 16 in November. Later that month, she advanced to the semifinals of the Korea Open, defeating Miyazaki in the quarterfinals before losing to world No. 1 An Se-young.

== Achievements ==
=== BWF World Tour (1 title, 3 runners-up) ===
The BWF World Tour, which was announced on 19 March 2017 and implemented in 2018, is a series of elite badminton tournaments sanctioned by the Badminton World Federation (BWF). The BWF World Tours are divided into levels of World Tour Finals, Super 1000, Super 750, Super 500, Super 300 (part of the HSBC World Tour), and the BWF Tour Super 100.

Women's singles
| Year | Tournament | Level | Opponent | Score | Result | Ref. |
|---|---|---|---|---|---|---|
| 2024 | Orleans Masters | Super 300 | (Japan) Tomoka Miyazaki | 21–18, 21–12 | (silver) Runner-up | |
| 2024 (I) | Indonesia Masters | Super 100 | (Japan) Riko Gunji | 10–21, 20–22 | (silver) Runner-up | |
| 2025 | Kaohsiung Masters | Super 100 | (Japan) Nozomi Okuhara | 16–21, 17–21 | (silver) Runner-up | |
| 2025 | Syed Modi International | Super 300 | (Turkey) Neslihan Arın | 21–16, 21–14 | (gold) Winner | |

=== BWF International Challenge/Series (7 titles, 3 runners-up) ===
Women's singles
| Year | Tournament | Opponent | Score | Result | Ref. |
|---|---|---|---|---|---|
| 2022 | Slovenia Future Series | (Japan) Tomoka Miyazaki | 14–21, 19–21 | (silver) Runner-up | |
| 2023 | Osaka International | (Japan) Shiori Saito | 15–21, 13–21 | (silver) Runner-up | |
| 2023 | Luxembourg Open | (Chinese Taipei) Chiang Ying-li | 18–21, 21–15, 21–12 | (gold) Winner | |
| 2023 | Swedish Open | (Hong Kong) Lo Sin Yan | 21–12, 21–14 | (gold) Winner | |
| 2023 | Mauritius International | (India) Aditi Bhatt | 21–13, 21–17 | (gold) Winner | |
| 2023 | Réunion Open | (Japan) Kaoru Sugiyama | 22–20, 21–10 | (gold) Winner | |
| 2024 | Luxembourg Open | (Japan) Riko Gunji | 21–16, 21–14 | (gold) Winner | |
| 2024 | Denmark Challenge | (Japan) Riko Gunji | 22–20, 16–21, 11–21 | (silver) Runner-up | |
| 2024 (I) | Indonesia International | (Indonesia) Chiara Marvella Handoyo | 11–21, 21–18, 21–7 | (gold) Winner | |

Women's doubles
| Year | Tournament | Partner | Opponent | Score | Result | Ref. |
|---|---|---|---|---|---|---|
| 2022 | Slovenia Future Series | (Japan) Sorano Yoshikawa | (Japan) Rui Kiyama (Japan) Kanano Muroya | 24–22, 21–16 | (gold) Winner | |

BWF International Challenge tournament
BWF International Series tournament
BWF Future Series tournament

=== BWF Junior International (3 titles) ===
Girls' singles
| Year | Tournament | Opponent | Score | Result | Ref. |
|---|---|---|---|---|---|
| 2016 | Singapore Youth International | (Thailand) Thamonwan Nithiittikrai | 21–12, 21–19 | (gold) Winner | |
| 2022 | Croatia Junior Open | (Japan) Sora Ishioka | 17–21, 21–13, 21–14 | (gold) Winner | |
| 2022 | Bulgaria Junior Open | (Japan) Sora Ishioka | 21–16, 21–14 | (gold) Winner | |

BWF Junior International Challenge tournament
BWF Junior International Series tournament

== Performance timeline ==
Key

| W | Won | F | Finalist | SF | Semi-finalist |
| QF | Quarter-finalist | #R | Rounds 4, 3, 2, 1 | RR | Round-robin stage |
| Q# | Qualification round | A | Absent | w/d | Withdrew |
| G | Gold | S | Silver | B | Bronze |
| NH | Not held | N/A | Not applicable | DNQ | Did not qualify |

=== National team ===
- Junior level

| Team events | 2022 | Ref. |
|---|---|---|
| World Junior Championships | B | |

- Senior level

| Team events | 2022 | 2023 | 2024 | 2025 | 2026 | Ref. |
|---|---|---|---|---|---|---|
| Asia Team Championships | B | NH | A | NH | 5th | |
| Uber Cup | A | NH | A | NH | B | |

=== Individual competitions ===
- Junior level

| Events | 2022 | Ref. |
|---|---|---|
| World Junior Championships | QF | |

- Senior level

| Tournament | BWF World Tour | | | | Best | Ref. |
| Tournament | 2023 | 2024 | 2025 | 2026 | Best | Ref. |
|---|---|---|---|---|---|---|
| India Open | A | | | 1R | 1R ('26) | |
| Thailand Masters | A | | | QF | QF ('26) | |
| German Open | A | | QF | A | QF ('25) | |
| All England Open | A | | | 1R | 1R ('26) | |
| Swiss Open | A | | | 1R | 1R ('26) | |
| Orléans Masters | A | F | 1R | 1R | F ('24) | |
| Thailand Open | A | | 1R | SF | SF ('26) | |
| Malaysia Masters | A | | 1R | SF | SF ('26) | |
| Singapore Open | A | | | 2R | 2R ('26) | |
| Indonesia Open | A | | | 1R | 1R ('26) | |
| Macau Open | NH | 1R | QF | A | QF ('25) | |
| U.S. Open | A | SF | A | | SF ('24) | |
| Japan Open | A | | | 1R | 1R ('26) | |
| China Open | A | | | 1R | 1R ('26) | |
| Taipei Open | A | | 1R | A | 1R ('25) | |
| Korea Masters | A | 1R | SF | QF | SF ('25) | |
| China Masters | A | | | 1R | 1R ('26) | |
| Indonesia Masters Super 100 | A | F | 2R | A | F ('24) | |
| Indonesia Masters Super 100 | QF | A | QF | A | F ('24) | |
| Arctic Open | A | | | 1R | 1R ('26) | |
| Denmark Open | A | | | 2R | 2R ('26) | |
| Malaysia Super 100 | A | 1R | SF | A | SF ('25) | |
| French Open | A | | | SF | SF ('26) | |
| Korea Open | A | | | SF | SF ('26) | |
| Japan Masters | A | 1R | 2R | 1R | 2R ('25) | |
| Kaohsiung Masters | A | | F | A | F ('25) | |
| Hong Kong Open | A | | | QF | QF ('26) | |
| Syed Modi International | A | | W | A | W ('25) | |
| Guwahati Masters | A | | SF | A | SF ('25) | |
| Year-end ranking | 102 | 41 | 34 | | 14 | |
| Tournament | 2023 | 2024 | 2025 | 2026 | Best | Ref. |

== Wins over top-10 ranked players ==
Wins over players who were ranked in the world's top 10 at the time the match was played.

| # | Opponent | Rk | Tournament | Rd | Score | Rk | Ref. |
|---|---|---|---|---|---|---|---|
| 1 | (Thailand) Ratchanok Intanon | 7 | 2026 Thailand Open | QF | 21–13, 21–16 | 28 | |
| 2 | (China) Wang Zhiyi | 3 | 2026 French Open | 2R | 21–19, 22–20 | 22 | |
| 3 | (Indonesia) Putri Kusuma Wardani | 6 | 2026 French Open | QF | 21–17, 21–18 | 22 | |
| 4 | (Japan) Tomoka Miyazaki | 7 | 2026 Korea Open | QF | 13–21, 23–21, 21–8 | 16 | |

== Record against selected opponents ==
Record against Year-end Finals finalists, World Championships semi-finalists, and Olympic quarter-finalists. Accurate as of 11 November 2026.

| Player | M | W | L | Diff. |
|---|---|---|---|---|
| (China) Chen Yufei | 4 | 0 | 4 | –4 |
| (China) Wang Zhiyi | 2 | 1 | 1 | 0 |
| (India) P. V. Sindhu | 1 | 0 | 1 | –1 |
| (Indonesia) Gregoria Mariska Tunjung | 1 | 0 | 1 | –1 |
| (Indonesia) Putri Kusuma Wardani | 1 | 1 | 0 | +1 |

| Player | M | W | L | Diff. |
|---|---|---|---|---|
| (Japan) Nozomi Okuhara | 7 | 1 | 6 | –5 |
| (Japan) Akane Yamaguchi | 1 | 0 | 1 | –1 |
| (South Korea) An Se-young | 2 | 0 | 2 | –2 |
| (Thailand) Ratchanok Intanon | 1 | 1 | 0 | +1 |
