= 2026 Thailand Open (badminton) =

2026 badminton tournament in Thailand

Tournament details
- Dates: 12–17 May
- Edition: 38th
- Level: Super 500
- Total prize money: US$500,000
- Venue: Nimibutr Stadium
- Location: Bangkok, Thailand

Champions
- Men's singles: (Denmark) Anders Antonsen
- Women's singles: (Japan) Akane Yamaguchi
- Men's doubles: (Indonesia) Leo Rolly Carnando (Indonesia) Daniel Marthin
- Women's doubles: (China) Bao Lijing (China) Cao Zihan
- Mixed doubles: (Denmark) Mathias Christiansen (Denmark) Alexandra Bøje

The 2026 Thailand Open (officially known as the Toyota Thailand Open 2026 Presented by VICTOR for sponsorship reasons) was a badminton tournament that is held at the Nimibutr Stadium in Bangkok, Thailand, from 12 to 17 May 2026. The tournament had a total prize money of $500,000.

== Tournament ==
The 2026 Thailand Open was the tenth tournament of the 2026 BWF World Tour and was part of the Thailand Open championships, which have been held since 1984. The tournament is organized by the Badminton Association of Thailand and is sanctioned by the BWF.

=== Venue ===
This international tournament was held at the Nimibutr Stadium in Bangkok, Thailand.

=== Points distribution ===
Below is the points distribution table for each phase of the tournament based on the BWF points system for the BWF World Tour Super 500 event.

Winner	Runner-up	3/4	5/8	9/16	17/32	33/64	65/128
9,200	7,800	6,420	5,040	3,600	2,220	880	430

=== Prize pool ===
The total prize money is US$500,000 and is distributed according to BWF regulations.

Event	Winner	Finalist	Semi-finals	Quarter-finals	Last 16
Singles	$37,500	$19,000	$7,250	$3,000	$1,750
Doubles	$39,500	$19,000	$7,000	$3,625	$1,875

== Men's singles ==
=== Seeds ===
1. (China) Shi Yuqi (semi-finals)
2. (Thailand) Kunlavut Vitidsarn (final)
3. (Denmark) Anders Antonsen (champion)
4. (Chinese Taipei) Chou Tien-chen (semi-finals)
5. (China) Li Shifeng (withdrew)
6. (Japan) Kodai Naraoka (second round)
7. (India) Lakshya Sen (quarter-finals)
8. (Singapore) Loh Kean Yew (first round)

=== Finals ===
Semi-finals
1	(China) Shi Yuqi
3	(Denmark) Anders Antonsen	w	/	o
4	(Chinese Taipei) Chou Tien-chen	7	19
2	(Thailand) Kunlavut Vitidsarn	21	21

Final
3	(Denmark) Anders Antonsen	9	24	21
2	(Thailand) Kunlavut Vitidsarn	21	22	18

=== Top half ===
==== Section 1 ====
First round
1	(China) Shi YQ	21	21
(Indonesia) A S Ginting	12	17
(Denmark) M Johannesen	14	15
(Hong Kong) Lee C Y	21	21
6	(Japan) K Naraoka	21	17	21
(India) A Shetty	13	21	4
(Japan) K Watanabe	21	21
(India) T Mannepali	12	16

Second round
1	(China) Shi YQ	21	21
(Hong Kong) Lee C Y	16	11
6	(Japan) K Naraoka	14	21	15
(Japan) K Watanabe	21	14	21

Quarter-finals
1	(China) Shi YQ	21	13	21
(Japan) K Watanabe	14	21	16

==== Section 2 ====
First round
3	(Denmark) A Antonsen	21	21
(Hong Kong) J Gunawan	7	17
(Indonesia) P B Shujiwo	15	19
(Japan) Y Tanaka	21	21
8	(Singapore) Loh K Y	14	15
(India) S Kidambi	21	21
(Chinese Taipei) Wang T-w	21	16	17
PFQ	(Chinese Taipei) Su L-y	9	21	21

Second round
3	(Denmark) A Antonsen	21	18	22
(Japan) Y Tanaka	13	21	20
(India) S Kidambi	16	21	18
PFQ	(Chinese Taipei) Su L-y	21	11	21

Quarter-finals
3	(Denmark) A Antonsen	21	21
PFQ	(Chinese Taipei) Su L-y	11	11

=== Bottom half ===
==== Section 3 ====
First round
(Thailand) Pan Teeraratsakul	10	18
(Indonesia) Z Ubaidillah	21	21
(South Korea) Jeon H-j	22	21
SWM	(Canada) V Lai	20	19
Q2	(Malaysia) Lee Z J	20	10
Q4	(Israel) D Dubovenko	22	21
Q1	(Denmark) D J Holm	21	16	10
4	(Chinese Taipei) Chou T-c	10	21	21

Second round
(Indonesia) Z Ubaidillah	13	5
(South Korea) Jeon H-j	21	21
Q4	(Israel) D Dubovenko	16	17
4	(Chinese Taipei) Chou T-c	21	21

Quarter-finals
(South Korea) Jeon H-j	18	23	14
4	(Chinese Taipei) Chou T-c	21	21	21

==== Section 4 ====
First round
(Chinese Taipei) Wang P-w	9	13
Q3	(China) Zhu XC	21	21
(Singapore) J Teh	16	17
7	(India) L Sen	21	21
(Chinese Taipei) Lee C-h	21	21
(Chinese Taipei) Chi Y-j	17	19
(Japan) Y Okimoto	16	12
2	(Thailand) K Vitidsarn	21	21

Second round
Q3	(China) Zhu XC	12	13
7	(India) L Sen	21	21
(Chinese Taipei) Lee C-h	11	13
2	(Thailand) K Vitidsarn	21	21

Quarter-finals
7	(India) L Sen	19	16
2	(Thailand) K Vitidsarn	21	21

== Women's singles ==
=== Seeds ===
1. (Japan) Akane Yamaguchi (champion)
2. (China) Chen Yufei (final)
3. (Thailand) Ratchanok Intanon (quarter-finals)
4. (Thailand) Pornpawee Chochuwong (quarter-finals)
5. (Japan) Tomoka Miyazaki (quarter-finals)
6. (India) P. V. Sindhu (quarter-finals)
7. (Chinese Taipei) Chiu Pin-chian (first round)
8. (Thailand) Supanida Katethong (first round)

=== Finals ===
Semi-finals
1	(Japan) Akane Yamaguchi	21	21
(Thailand) Pitchamon Opatniputh	11	15
(Japan) Hina Akechi	17	19
2	(China) Chen Yufei	21	21

Final
1	(Japan) Akane Yamaguchi	21	21
2	(China) Chen Yufei	14	18

=== Top half ===
==== Section 1 ====
First round
1	(Japan) A Yamaguchi	21	21
(China) Han QX	17	15
(Thailand) B Ongbamrungphan	21	21
(Singapore) Yeo J M	16	6
6	(India) P. V. Sindhu	21	21
(Chinese Taipei) Tung C-t	9	12
(Chinese Taipei) Huang Y-h	11	14
(Denmark) A Schulz	21	21

Second round
1	(Japan) A Yamaguchi	21	17	21
(Thailand) B Ongbamrungphan	12	21	17
6	(India) P. V. Sindhu	21	21
(Denmark) A Schulz	13	15

Quarter-finals
1	(Japan) A Yamaguchi	19	21	21
6	(India) P. V. Sindhu	21	18	15

==== Section 2 ====
First round
4	(Thailand) P Chochuwong	11	21	21
(India) U Hooda	21	17	16
Q3	(Thailand) Y Ketklieng	13	21	21
(Malaysia) Goh J W	21	19	16
8	(Thailand) S Katethong	15	20
(Thailand) P Opatniputh	21	22
(India) D Sihag	21	13	21
(Japan) N Nidaira	19	21	15

Second round
4	(Thailand) P Chochuwong	21	21
Q3	(Thailand) Y Ketklieng	13	17
(Thailand) P Opatniputh	23	21
(India) D Sihag	21	11

Quarter-finals
4	(Thailand) P Chochuwong	19	21	15
(Thailand) P Opatniputh	21	13	21

=== Bottom half ===
==== Section 3 ====
First round
(India) T Sharma	17	8
(Japan) H Akechi	21	21
(Denmark) L Kjærsfeldt	22	11	21
7	(Chinese Taipei) Chiu P-c	20	21	19
Q2	(Indonesia) T R Wiryawan	15	21	21
(India) I Baruah	21	19	15
Q1	(Thailand) T Kleebyeesun	19	18
3	(Thailand) R Intanon	21	21

Second round
(Japan) H Akechi	21	19	21
(Denmark) L Kjærsfeldt	14	21	14
Q2	(Indonesia) T R Wiryawan	16	21	15
3	(Thailand) R Intanon	21	19	21

Quarter-finals
(Japan) H Akechi	21	21
3	(Thailand) R Intanon	13	16

==== Section 4 ====
First round
(Chinese Taipei) Lin H-t	19	17
(Japan) R Gunji	21	21
Q4	(Germany) Y Li	10	15
5	(Japan) T Miyazaki	21	21
(India) M Bansod	13	26	21
(Canada) W Y Zhang	21	24	13
(India) A Kharb	21	13	18
2	(China) Chen YF	19	21	21

Second round
(Japan) R Gunji	19	17
5	(Japan) T Miyazaki	21	21
(India) M Bansod	12	7
2	(China) Chen YF	21	21

Quarter-finals
5	(Japan) T Miyazaki	15	18
2	(China) Chen YF	21	21

== Men's doubles ==
=== Seeds ===
1. (India) Satwiksairaj Rankireddy / Chirag Shetty (final)
2. (Indonesia) Sabar Karyaman Gutama / Muhammad Reza Pahlevi Isfahani (withdrew)
3. (Malaysia) Goh Sze Fei / Nur Izzuddin (semi-finals)
4. (Chinese Taipei) Lee Fang-chih / Lee Fang-jen (second round)
5. (Malaysia) Nur Mohd Azriyn Ayub / Tan Wee Kiong (second round)
6. (Japan) Takumi Nomura / Yuichi Shimogami (quarter-finals)
7. (India) Hariharan Amsakarunan / Arjun M. R. (first round)
8. (Indonesia) Muhammad Rian Ardianto / Rahmat Hidayat (first round)

=== Finals ===
Semi-finals
1	(India) Satwiksairaj Rankireddy (India) Chirag Shetty	19	22	21
3	(Malaysia) Goh Sze Fei (Malaysia) Nur Izzuddin	21	20	16
(Indonesia) Leo Rolly Carnando (Indonesia) Daniel Marthin	21	21
Q1	(China) He Jiting (China) Ren Xiangyu	15	18

Final
1	(India) Satwiksairaj Rankireddy (India) Chirag Shetty	12	23
(Indonesia) Leo Rolly Carnando (Indonesia) Daniel Marthin	21	25

=== Top half ===
==== Section 1 ====
First round
1	(India) S Rankireddy (India) C Shetty	21	21	21
(Indonesia) P Erwiansyah (Indonesia) B Maulana	19	23	10
(Hong Kong) Hung K C (Hong Kong) Lui C W	20	13
PFQ	(Malaysia) B Goonting (Malaysia) M Haikal	22	21
6	(Japan) T Nomura (Japan) Y Shimogami	21	21
(Singapore) W Koh (Singapore) J Kubo	18	13
(Czech Republic) J Král (Czech Republic) O Král	17	21	10
(China) Xie HN (China) Zeng WH	21	18	21

Second round
1	(India) S Rankireddy (India) C Shetty	21	21
PFQ	(Malaysia) B Goonting (Malaysia) M Haikal	12	19
6	(Japan) T Nomura (Japan) Y Shimogami	22	21
(China) Xie HN (China) Zeng WH	20	15

Quarter-finals
1	(India) S Rankireddy (India) C Shetty	21	21
6	(Japan) T Nomura (Japan) Y Shimogami	12	13

==== Section 2 ====
First round
3	(Malaysia) Goh S F (Malaysia) N Izzuddin	21	17	21
Q2	(Japan) H Okamura (Japan) K Yamashita	15	21	12
(Thailand) C Charoenkitamorn (Thailand) W Thongsa-nga	15	8
(China) Huang D (China) Liu Y	21	21
8	(Indonesia) M R Ardianto (Indonesia) R Hidayat	22	19	11
(Malaysia) Chia W J (Malaysia) Teo E Y	20	21	21
(Scotland) C Grimley (Scotland) M Grimley	21	21
Q4	(Vietnam) Nguyễn Đ H (Vietnam) Trần Đ M	8	19

Second round
3	(Malaysia) Goh S F (Malaysia) N Izzuddin	21	24
(China) Huang D (China) Liu Y	14	22
(Malaysia) Chia W J (Malaysia) Teo E Y	24	10
(Scotland) C Grimley (Scotland) M Grimley	26	21

Quarter-finals
3	(Malaysia) Goh S F (Malaysia) N Izzuddin	19	21	21
(Scotland) C Grimley (Scotland) M Grimley	21	15	8

=== Bottom half ===
==== Section 3 ====
First round
(Indonesia) L R Carnando (Indonesia) D Marthin	21	21
(Chinese Taipei) Lai P-y (Chinese Taipei) Tsai F-c	9	8
(Malaysia) Low H Y (Malaysia) Ng E C	9	14
SWM	(China) Hu KY (China) Lin XY	21	21
(France) J Maio (France) W Villeger	20	16
(Thailand) P Sukphun (Thailand) Pak Teeraratsakul	22	21
(Scotland) A Dunn (Scotland) A Pringle	11	15
5	(Malaysia) N Azriyn (Malaysia) Tan W K	21	21

Second round
(Indonesia) L R Carnando (Indonesia) D Marthin	21	21
SWM	(China) Hu KY (China) Lin XY	16	13
(Thailand) P Sukphun (Thailand) Pak Teeraratsakul	13	22	21
5	(Malaysia) N Azriyn (Malaysia) Tan W K	21	20	14

Quarter-finals
(Indonesia) L R Carnando (Indonesia) D Marthin	21	21
(Thailand) P Sukphun (Thailand) Pak Teeraratsakul	16	15

==== Section 4 ====
First round
(Chinese Taipei) He Z-w (Chinese Taipei) Huang J-h	16	11
(Chinese Taipei) Chen C-k (Chinese Taipei) Liu K-h	21	21
(Chinese Taipei) Chen Z-r (Chinese Taipei) Lin Y-c	21	22
7	(India) H Amsakarunan (India) M R Arjun	18	20
(Singapore) D Wee (Singapore) H Wong	9	10
Q1	(China) He JT (China) Ren XY	21	21
Q3	(Malaysia) Choong H J (Malaysia) Wong V S	20	26	7
4	(Chinese Taipei) Lee F-c (Chinese Taipei) Lee F-j	22	24	21

Second round
(Chinese Taipei) Chen C-k (Chinese Taipei) Liu K-h	21	19	20
(Chinese Taipei) Chen Z-r (Chinese Taipei) Lin Y-c	11	21	22
Q1	(China) He JT (China) Ren XY	23	21
4	(Chinese Taipei) Lee F-c (Chinese Taipei) Lee F-j	21	19

Quarter-finals
(Chinese Taipei) Chen Z-r (Chinese Taipei) Lin Y-c	14	21	11
Q1	(China) He JT (China) Ren XY	21	15	21

== Women's doubles ==
=== Seeds ===
1. (Japan) Rin Iwanaga / Kie Nakanishi (final)
2. (Chinese Taipei) Hsieh Pei-shan / Hung En-tzu (first round)
3. (Chinese Taipei) Hsu Ya-ching / Sung Yu-hsuan (second round)
4. (Japan) Rui Hirokami / Sayaka Hobara (semi-finals)
5. (Japan) Kaho Osawa / Mai Tanabe (first round)
6. (China) Chen Fanshutian / Luo Xumin (second round)
7. (Malaysia) Ong Xin Yee / Carmen Ting (first round)
8. (Hong Kong) Yeung Nga Ting / Yeung Pui Lam (second round)

=== Finals ===
Semi-finals
1	(Japan) Rin Iwanaga (Japan) Kie Nakanishi	22	21
4	(Japan) Rui Hirokami (Japan) Sayaka Hobara	20	12
(Chinese Taipei) Hu Ling-fang (Chinese Taipei) Jheng Yu-chieh	18	17
(China) Bao Lijing (China) Cao Zihan	21	21

Final
1	(Japan) Rin Iwanaga (Japan) Kie Nakanishi	21	16	19
(China) Bao Lijing (China) Cao Zihan	19	21	21

=== Top half ===
==== Section 1 ====
First round
1	(Japan) R Iwanaga (Japan) K Nakanishi	21	21
(United States) L Lam (United States) A Lee	14	12
Q3	(Thailand) S Lekjura (Thailand) P Manjakanon	14	18
(Spain) P López (Spain) L Rodríguez	21	21
7	(Malaysia) Ong X Y (Malaysia) C Ting	21	14	14
(Indonesia) I S Meida (Indonesia) R Nastine	16	21	21
Q2	(Chinese Taipei) Cheng Y-p (Chinese Taipei) Sun Y-h	9	21
(China) Luo Y (China) Wang TG	21	23

Second round
1	(Japan) R Iwanaga (Japan) K Nakanishi	21	21
(Spain) P López (Spain) L Rodríguez	17	6
(Indonesia) I S Meida (Indonesia) R Nastine	25	21
(China) Luo Y (China) Wang TG	23	13

Quarter-finals
1	(Japan) R Iwanaga (Japan) K Nakanishi	21	12	21
(Indonesia) I S Meida (Indonesia) R Nastine	12	21	17

==== Section 2 ====
First round
4	(Japan) R Hirokami (Japan) S Hobara	21	21
(Thailand) T Kleebyeesun (Thailand) N Laisuan	17	6
Q4	(Thailand) K Chaichana (Thailand) P Polyiam	21	13	27
(Thailand) P Phatcharaphisutsin (Thailand) A Povanon	14	21	25
8	(Hong Kong) Yeung N T (Hong Kong) Yeung P L	21	21
(Thailand) P Aiamvareesrisakul (Thailand) S Janpeng	11	18
(Thailand) H Mijad (Thailand) N Tungkasatan	12	10
Q1	(Japan) S Hirota (Japan) A Sakuramoto	21	21

Second round
4	(Japan) R Hirokami (Japan) S Hobara	21	21
Q4	(Thailand) K Chaichana (Thailand) P Polyiam	7	7
8	(Hong Kong) Yeung N T (Hong Kong) Yeung P L	14	16
Q1	(Japan) S Hirota (Japan) A Sakuramoto	21	21

Quarter-finals
4	(Japan) R Hirokami (Japan) S Hobara	21	21
Q1	(Japan) S Hirota (Japan) A Sakuramoto	11	12

=== Bottom half ===
==== Section 3 ====
First round
(Japan) H Suzuki (Japan) N Yamakita	21	21
(Malaysia) Chong J Y (Malaysia) V Ng	16	17
(Chinese Taipei) Chen Y-f (Chinese Taipei) Sun L-c	17	10
6	(China) Chen FST (China) Luo XM	21	21
(Scotland) J MacPherson (Scotland) C Torrance	16	18
(Chinese Taipei) Hu L-f (Chinese Taipei) Jheng Y-c	21	21
(Hong Kong) Fan K Y (Hong Kong) Yau M Y	20	12
3	(Chinese Taipei) Hsu Y-c (Chinese Taipei) Sung Y-h	22	21

Second round
(Japan) H Suzuki (Japan) N Yamakita	24	8	21
6	(China) Chen FST (China) Luo XM	22	21	15
(Chinese Taipei) Hu L-f (Chinese Taipei) Jheng Y-c	21	21
3	(Chinese Taipei) Hsu Y-c (Chinese Taipei) Sung Y-h	13	14

Quarter-finals
(Japan) H Suzuki (Japan) N Yamakita	20	21	15
(Chinese Taipei) Hu L-f (Chinese Taipei) Jheng Y-c	22	19	21

==== Section 4 ====
First round
(India) R Panda (India) S Panda	9	11
(Chinese Taipei) Lin C-c (Chinese Taipei) Yang C-y	21	21
(Hong Kong) Lui L L (Hong Kong) Tsang H Y	21	18	21
5	(Japan) K Osawa (Japan) M Tanabe	12	21	15
(Indonesia) L T Mayasari (Indonesia) A Rahayu	17	21	18
(Chinese Taipei) Hsieh Y-e (Chinese Taipei) Teng C-h	21	12	21
(China) Bao LJ (China) Cao ZH	21	14
2	(Chinese Taipei) Hsieh P-s (Chinese Taipei) Hung E-t	15	3^{r}

Second round
(Chinese Taipei) Lin C-c (Chinese Taipei) Yang C-y	21	18	21
(Hong Kong) Lui L L (Hong Kong) Tsang H Y	17	21	13
(Chinese Taipei) Hsieh Y-e (Chinese Taipei) Teng C-h	17	17
(China) Bao LJ (China) Cao ZH	21	21

Quarter-finals
(Chinese Taipei) Lin C-c (Chinese Taipei) Yang C-y	14	19
(China) Bao LJ (China) Cao ZH	21	21

== Mixed doubles ==
=== Seeds ===
1. (Thailand) Dechapol Puavaranukroh / Supissara Paewsampran (semi-finals)
2. (Denmark) Mathias Christiansen / Alexandra Boje (champions)
3. (Hong Kong) Tang Chun Man / Tse Ying Suet (second round)
4. (Indonesia) Jafar Hidayatullah / Felisha Pasaribu (second round)
5. (Chinese Taipei) Ye Hong-wei / Nicole Gonzales Chan (quarter-finals)
6. (China) Cheng Xing / Zhang Chi (semi-finals)
7. (China) Gao Jiaxuan / Wei Yaxin (quarter-finals)
8. (Thailand) Ruttanapak Oupthong / Jhenicha Sudjaipraparat (second round)

=== Finals ===
Semi-finals
1	(Thailand) Dechapol Puavaranukroh (Thailand) Supissara Paewsampran	17	21	18
(China) Zhu Yijun (China) Li Qian	21	10	21
6	(China) Cheng Xing (China) Zhang Chi	21	21	16
2	(Denmark) Mathias Christiansen (Denmark) Alexandra Bøje	23	17	21

Final
(China) Zhu Yijun (China) Li Qian	17	15
2	(Denmark) Mathias Christiansen (Denmark) Alexandra Bøje	21	21

=== Top half ===
==== Section 1 ====
First round
1	(Thailand) D Puavaranukroh (Thailand) S Paewsampran	21	20	21
(Indonesia) A Maulana (Indonesia) I C S Jamil	11	22	18
PFQ	(Thailand) S Jomkoh (Thailand) O Jongsathapornparn	21	21
(India) R Kapoor (India) R Gadde	15	10
5	(Chinese Taipei) Ye H-w (Chinese Taipei) N G Chan	13	21	21
Q4	(Chinese Taipei) Wu H-y (Chinese Taipei) Yang C-y	21	17	14
Q3	(Chinese Taipei) Tsai F-c (Chinese Taipei) Sung Y-h	24	21
(India) A Surya (India) A Pramuthesh	22	11

Second round
1	(Thailand) D Puavaranukroh (Thailand) S Paewsampran	21	21
PFQ	(Thailand) S Jomkoh (Thailand) O Jongsathapornparn	14	7
5	(Chinese Taipei) Ye H-w (Chinese Taipei) N G Chan	22	21
Q3	(Chinese Taipei) Tsai F-c (Chinese Taipei) Sung Y-h	20	19

Quarter-finals
1	(Thailand) D Puavaranukroh (Thailand) S Paewsampran	21	20	21
5	(Chinese Taipei) Ye H-w (Chinese Taipei) N G Chan	17	22	10

==== Section 2 ====
First round
4	(Indonesia) J Hidayatullah (Indonesia) F Pasaribu	21	21
(Thailand) R Makkasasithorn (Thailand) N Laisuan	13	7
(China) Zhu YJ (China) Li Q	21	21
(Chinese Taipei) Yang P-h (Chinese Taipei) Hu L-f	15	16
8	(Thailand) R Oupthong (Thailand) J Sudjaipraparat	17	21	21
(Scotland) A Dunn (Scotland) J MacPherson	21	19	13
(Chinese Taipei) He Z-w (Chinese Taipei) Sun L-c	19	15
(Japan) A Koga (Japan) N Saito	21	21

Second round
4	(Indonesia) J Hidayatullah (Indonesia) F Pasaribu	18	21
(China) Zhu YJ (China) Li Q	21	23
8	(Thailand) R Oupthong (Thailand) J Sudjaipraparat	24	12	7
(Japan) A Koga (Japan) N Saito	22	21	21

Quarter-finals
(China) Zhu YJ (China) Li Q	21	22
(Japan) A Koga (Japan) N Saito	10	20

=== Bottom half ===
==== Section 3 ====
First round
(Indonesia) A Syahnawi (Indonesia) N V Marwah	17	22	21
(France) J Maio (France) L Palermo	21	20	8
(Thailand) Pak Teeraratsakul (Thailand) S Taerattanachai	19	21	17
6	(China) Cheng X (China) Zhang C	21	17	21
(Japan) Y Shimogami (Japan) S Hobara	21	21
Q2	(Thailand) T Setthaprasert (Thailand) P Rungruengpramong	8	13
(Indonesia) B Setiabudi (Indonesia) M D Oktavianti	18	9
3	(Hong Kong) Tang C M (Hong Kong) Tse Y S	21	21

Second round
(Indonesia) A Syahnawi (Indonesia) N V Marwah	13	21	14
6	(China) Cheng X (China) Zhang C	21	17	21
(Japan) Y Shimogami (Japan) S Hobara	17	21	21
3	(Hong Kong) Tang C M (Hong Kong) Tse Y S	21	15	18

Quarter-finals
6	(China) Cheng X (China) Zhang C	21	21
(Japan) Y Shimogami (Japan) S Hobara	15	11

==== Section 4 ====
First round
(Chinese Taipei) Wu G-x (Chinese Taipei) Lee C-h	15	16
(Indonesia) D Ferdinansyah (Indonesia) B Wardana	21	21
(Malaysia) Wong T C (Malaysia) Lim C S	12	15
7	(China) Gao JX (China) Wei YX	21	21
(Indonesia) V Y Mulia (Indonesia) A Pranata	21	21
Q1	(Canada) N Aung (Thailand) S Tepnarong	11	10
(India) D Kapila (India) T Crasto	9	15
2	(Denmark) M Christiansen (Denmark) A Bøje	21	21

Second round
(Indonesia) D Ferdinansyah (Indonesia) B Wardana	18	12
7	(China) Gao JX (China) Wei YX	21	21
(Indonesia) V Y Mulia (Indonesia) A Pranata	9	21
2	(Denmark) M Christiansen (Denmark) A Bøje	21	23

Quarter-finals
7	(China) Gao JX (China) Wei YX	16	21	19
2	(Denmark) M Christiansen (Denmark) A Bøje	21	18	21

Preceded by 2026 Orléans Masters	BWF World Tour; 2026 BWF season	Succeeded by 2026 Malaysia Masters
