= 2026 India Open =

Badminton tournament in India

BWF India Open 2026
Tournament details
- Dates: 13–18 January
- Edition: 24th
- Level: Super 750
- Total prize money: US$950,000
- Venue: Indira Gandhi Arena
- Location: New Delhi, India

Champions
- Men's singles: (Chinese Taipei) Lin Chun-yi
- Women's singles: (South Korea) An Se-young
- Men's doubles: (China) Liang Weikeng (China) Wang Chang
- Women's doubles: (China) Liu Shengshu (China) Tan Ning
- Mixed doubles: (Thailand) Dechapol Puavaranukroh (Thailand) Supissara Paewsampran

The 2026 India Open, officially known as the Yonex Sunrise India Open 2026 for sponsorship reasons, was a badminton tournament that took place at the Indira Gandhi Arena, New Delhi, India, from 13 through 18 January 2026, with a total prize of US$950,000.

== Tournament ==
The 2026 India Open was the second tournament of the 2026 BWF World Tour and a part of the India Open, which has been held since 1973. It was organized by the Badminton Association of India with sanction from the BWF.

=== Venue ===
This tournament was held at the Indira Gandhi Arena in New Delhi, India.

=== Point distribution ===
Below is the point distribution table for each phase of the tournament based on the BWF points system for the BWF World Tour Super 750 event.

Winner	Runner-up	3/4	5/8	9/16	17/32
11,000	9,350	7,700	6,050	4,320	2,660

=== Prize pool ===
The total prize money was US$950,000 with the distribution of the prize money in accordance with BWF regulations.

Event	Winner	Finalist	Semi-finals	Quarter-finals	Last 16	Last 32
Singles	$66,500	$32,300	$13,300	$5,225	$2,850	$950
Doubles	$70,300	$33,250	$13,300	$5,937.50	$3,087.50	$950

== Issues with air quality, cleanliness and lighting ==
Danish men's singles player and world no. 3 Anders Antonsen withdrew from the India Open for the third straight time, citing pollution and air quality in New Delhi as hindrances in his participation in the tournament and even went on to say "I don't think it’s a place to host a badminton tournament". Consequently, he was fined US$5,000 as top players are required by the Badminton World Federation (BWF) to participate in all tournaments of Super 750 and Super 1000 levels.

Another Danish player Mia Blichfeldt described the venue as "dirty and unhealthy" and said that players had to wear layers even in warm-up sessions due to inadequate heating inside the venue to which Badminton Association of India (BAI) chief Sanjay Mishra replied, Blichfeldt's comments were "not about the playing arena specifically" and that "she was referring to the KD Jadhav Stadium, which is the training venue, and not the main playing arena. The playing arena has been kept clean, dirt-free and pigeon-free, and several players have expressed satisfaction with the conditions". However, the second round match in the men's singles between Singapore's Loh Kean Yew and India's Prannoy H. S. was interrupted twice due to bird droppings landing on the court of the Indira Gandhi Arena. After the game, Loh also agreed with the Danish players that the air quality was affecting the players.

Additionally, some courts at the Indira Gandhi Stadium were lit unevenly, appearing as if illuminated by spotlights, with areas in between partly shaded and players seemingly losing sight of shuttles. This was in contrast to every other BWF World Tour event, where lighting is evenly distributed across the court. Delays in installing the lights had a domino effect, pushing back the Hawk-Eye setup required for line-call challenges. The issue appears to have been a case of poor calibration rather than a structural flaw.

== Men's singles ==
=== Seeds ===
1. (China) Shi Yuqi (withdrew)
2. (Thailand) Kunlavut Vitidsarn (quarter-finals)
3. (Indonesia) Jonatan Christie (final)
4. (Chinese Taipei) Chou Tien-chen (first round)
5. (France) Christo Popov (quarter-finals)
6. (France) Alex Lanier (first round)
7. (Japan) Kodai Naraoka (first round)
8. (Singapore) Loh Kean Yew (semi-finals)

=== Finals ===
Semi-finals
(Canada) Victor Lai	9	21	20
(Chinese Taipei) Lin Chun-yi	21	6	22
3	(Indonesia) Jonatan Christie	21	22
8	(Singapore) Loh Kean Yew	18	20

Final
(Chinese Taipei) Lin Chun-yi	21	21
3	(Indonesia) Jonatan Christie	10	18

=== Top half ===
==== Section 1 ====
First round
4	(Chinese Taipei) Chou T-c	19	11
(Canada) B Yang	21	21
(France) T J Popov	12	21	8
(Canada) V Lai	21	16	21
6	(France) A Lanier	17	19
(Chinese Taipei) Chi Y-j	21	21
(Denmark) R Gemke	21	18	21
(Malaysia) Lee Z J	13	21	18

Second round
(Canada) B Yang	15	12
(Canada) V Lai	21	21
(Chinese Taipei) Chi Y-j	21	21
(Denmark) R Gemke	17	15

Quarter-finals
(Canada) V Lai	21	17	21
(Chinese Taipei) Chi Y-j	18	21	15

==== Section 2 ====
First round
7	(Japan) K Naraoka	6	5^{r}
(Japan) K Nishimoto	21	7
(India) L Sen	21	21
(India) A Shetty	12	15
SWM	(Chinese Taipei) Lin C-y	21	21
(Chinese Taipei) Lee C-h	16	15
(South Korea) Jeon H-j	21	17	11
(Republic of Ireland) N Nguyen	18	21	21

Second round
(Japan) K Nishimoto	19	10
(India) L Sen	21	21
SWM	(Chinese Taipei) Lin C-y	21	21
(Republic of Ireland) N Nguyen	16	17

Quarter-finals
(India) L Sen	21	13	18
SWM	(Chinese Taipei) Lin C-y	17	21	21

=== Bottom half ===
==== Section 3 ====
First round
PFR	(India) T Mannepalli	21	6	19
(India) S Kidambi	15	21	21
(Chinese Taipei) Wang T-w	21	18	19
5	(France) C Popov	13	21	21
(Malaysia) Leong J H	5	3^{r}
(Japan) Y Tanaka	21	8
(Singapore) J Teh	16	10
3	(Indonesia) J Christie	21	21

Second round
(India) S Kidambi	14	21	17
5	(France) C Popov	21	17	21
(Japan) Y Tanaka	15	19
3	(Indonesia) J Christie	21	21

Quarter-finals
5	(France) C Popov	19	19
3	(Indonesia) J Christie	21	21

==== Section 4 ====
First round
(Hong Kong) Lee C Y	20	18
(India) Prannoy H. S.	22	21
(China) Wang ZX	21	21	14
8	(Singapore) Loh K Y	23	19	21
(China) Lu GZ	21	21
PFR	(Malaysia) J Hoh	17	15
(Japan) K Watanabe	19	25	10
2	(Thailand) K Vitidsarn	21	23	21

Second round
(India) Prannoy H. S.	21	19	14
8	(Singapore) Loh K Y	18	21	21
(China) Lu GZ	14	16
2	(Thailand) K Vitidsarn	21	21

Quarter-finals
8	(Singapore) Loh K Y	14	21	21
2	(Thailand) K Vitidsarn	21	15	17

== Women's singles ==
=== Seeds ===
1. (South Korea) An Se-young (champion)
2. (China) Wang Zhiyi (final)
3. (Japan) Akane Yamaguchi (withdrew)
4. (China) Chen Yufei (semi-finals)
5. (China) Han Yue (quarter-finals)
6. (Indonesia) Putri Kusuma Wardani (quarter-finals)
7. (Thailand) Ratchanok Intanon (semi-finals)
8. (Japan) Tomoka Miyazaki (second round)

=== Finals ===
Semi-finals
1	(South Korea) An Se-young	21	21
7	(Thailand) Ratchanok Intanon	11	7
4	(China) Chen Yufei	15	21
2	(China) Wang Zhiyi	21	23

Final
1	(South Korea) An Se-young	21	21
2	(China) Wang Zhiyi	13	11

=== Top half ===
==== Section 1 ====
First round
1	(South Korea) An S-y	21	21
(Japan) N Okuhara	17	9
(South Korea) Kim G-e	21	19	17
PFR	(Chinese Taipei) Huang Y-h	10	21	21
6	(Indonesia) P K Wardani	21	20	21
(Canada) M Li	12	22	15
(Scotland) K Gilmour	21	14	17
(Denmark) L Kjærsfeldt	14	21	21

Second round
1	(South Korea) An S-y	21	21
PFR	(Chinese Taipei) Huang Y-h	14	9
6	(Indonesia) P K Wardani	15	21	21
(Denmark) L Kjærsfeldt	21	9	18

Quarter-finals
1	(South Korea) An S-y	21	21
6	(Indonesia) P K Wardani	16	8

==== Section 2 ====
First round
7	(Thailand) R Intanon	21	21
(Japan) R Gunji	19	15
(Chinese Taipei) Chiu P-c	19	11
(Denmark) M Blichfeldt	21	21
SWM	(China) Gao FJ	13	1^{r}
(Japan) M Suizu	21	7
(United States) BW Zhang	21	21
(Denmark) L Christophersen	17	11

Second round
7	(Thailand) R Intanon	21	21
(Denmark) M Blichfeldt	16	11
(Japan) M Suizu	18	13
(United States) BW Zhang	21	21

Quarter-finals
7	(Thailand) R Intanon	21	21
(United States) BW Zhang	16	12

=== Bottom half ===
==== Section 3 ====
First round
(India) M Bansod	21	21
(Chinese Taipei) Pai Y-p	18	19
(Chinese Taipei) Sung S-y	21	13	17
5	(China) Han Y	18	21	21
(Chinese Taipei) Hsu W-c	16	12
(Thailand) B Ongbamrungphan	21	21
(Chinese Taipei) Lin H-t	17	17
4	(China) Chen YF	21	21

Second round
(India) M Bansod	18	15
5	(China) Han Y	21	21
(Thailand) B Ongbamrungphan	11	13
4	(China) Chen YF	21	21

Quarter-finals
5	(China) Han Y	8	18
4	(China) Chen YF	21	21

==== Section 4 ====
First round
(Thailand) S Katethong	17	21	14
(Japan) N Nidaira	21	18	21
(Japan) H Akechi	19	14
8	(Japan) T Miyazaki	21	21
(Vietnam) Nguyễn T L	20	21	21
(India) P. V. Sindhu	22	12	15
PFR	(India) T Sharma	20	21	13
2	(China) Wang ZY	22	18	21

Second round
(Japan) N Nidaira	21	8	21
8	(Japan) T Miyazaki	19	21	16
(Vietnam) Nguyễn T L	12	17
2	(China) Wang ZY	21	21

Quarter-finals
(Japan) N Nidaira	22	13	9
2	(China) Wang ZY	20	21	21

== Men's doubles ==
=== Seeds ===
1. (South Korea) Kim Won-ho / Seo Seung-jae (first round)
2. (Malaysia) Aaron Chia / Soh Wooi Yik (semi-finals)
3. (India) Satwiksairaj Rankireddy / Chirag Shetty (second round)
4. (China) Liang Weikeng / Wang Chang (champions)
5. (Malaysia) Man Wei Chong / Tee Kai Wun (quarter-finals)
6. (Malaysia) Goh Sze Fei / Nur Izzuddin (second round)
7. (Indonesia) Sabar Karyaman Gutama / Muhammad Reza Pahlevi Isfahani (second round)
8. (China) Chen Boyang / Liu Yi (first round)

=== Finals ===
Semi-finals
(South Korea) Kang Min-hyuk (South Korea) Ki Dong-ju	20	18
4	(China) Liang Weikeng (China) Wang Chang	22	21
(Japan) Hiroki Midorikawa (Japan) Kyohei Yamashita	21	13	21
2	(Malaysia) Aaron Chia (Malaysia) Soh Wooi Yik	10	21	11

Final
4	(China) Liang Weikeng (China) Wang Chang	17	25	21
(Japan) Hiroki Midorikawa (Japan) Kyohei Yamashita	21	23	16

=== Top half ===
==== Section 1 ====
First round
1	(South Korea) Kim W-h (South Korea) Seo S-j
(Chinese Taipei) He Z-w (Chinese Taipei) Huang J-h	w	/	o
(South Korea) Kang M-h (South Korea) Ki D-j	21	21
(Chinese Taipei) Lee F-c (Chinese Taipei) Lee F-j	18	19
7	(Indonesia) S K Gutama (Indonesia) M R P Isfahani	21	21
(Chinese Taipei) Chen Z-r (Chinese Taipei) Lin Y-c	13	8
(Thailand) K Kedren (Thailand) L E Wedler	15	17
(Japan) T Hoki (Japan) Y Kobayashi	21	21

Second round
(Chinese Taipei) He Z-w (Chinese Taipei) Huang J-h	15	10
(South Korea) Kang M-h (South Korea) Ki D-j	21	21
7	(Indonesia) S K Gutama (Indonesia) M R P Isfahani	15	13
(Japan) T Hoki (Japan) Y Kobayashi	21	21

Quarter-finals
(South Korea) Kang M-h (South Korea) Ki D-j	21	14	21
(Japan) T Hoki (Japan) Y Kobayashi	18	21	18

==== Section 2 ====
First round
4	(China) Liang WK (China) Wang C	23	21
(Denmark) D Lundgaard (Denmark) M Vestergaard	21	17
(India) H Amsakarunan (India) Arjun M. R.	21	21
(Malaysia) Ong Y S (Malaysia) Teo E Y	15	18
5	(Malaysia) Man W C (Malaysia) Tee K W	21	21
(Malaysia) N M Azriyn A (Malaysia) Tan W K	16	15
(France) C Popov (France) T J Popov	21	21
(Malaysia) Choong H J (Malaysia) M Haikal	11	19

Second round
4	(China) Liang WK (China) Wang C	21	21
(India) H Amsakarunan (India) Arjun M. R.	15	15
5	(Malaysia) Man W C (Malaysia) Tee K W	13	21	21
(France) C Popov (France) T J Popov	21	12	14

Quarter-finals
4	(China) Liang WK (China) Wang C	21	15	21
5	(Malaysia) Man W C (Malaysia) Tee K W	15	21	19

=== Bottom half ===
==== Section 3 ====
First round
(China) Huang D (China) Ren XY	21	21
(Denmark) K Astrup (Denmark) A S Rasmussen	19	18
(Chinese Taipei) Liu K-h (Chinese Taipei) Yang P-ha	21	21
8	(China) Chen BY (China) Liu Y	19	18
(Malaysia) Chia W J (Malaysia) Lwi S H	18	15
(Japan) H Midorikawa (Japan) K Yamashita	21	21
(United States) Chen Z-y (United States) P Smith
3	(India) S Rankireddy (India) C Shetty	w	/	o

Second round
(China) Huang D (China) Ren XY	21	19	14
(Chinese Taipei) Liu K-h (Chinese Taipei) Yang P-ha	17	21	21
(Japan) H Midorikawa (Japan) K Yamashita	25	23	21
3	(India) S Rankireddy (India) C Shetty	27	21	19

Quarter-finals
(Chinese Taipei) Liu K-h (Chinese Taipei) Yang P-ha	16	18
(Japan) H Midorikawa (Japan) K Yamashita	21	21

==== Section 4 ====
First round
(England) B Lane (England) S Vendy	16	21	18
(Chinese Taipei) Lee J-h (Chinese Taipei) Yang P-hs	21	15	21
(South Korea) Choi S-g (Malaysia) Goh V S	21	16	10
6	(Malaysia) Goh S F (Malaysia) N Izzuddin	19	21	21
(Japan) T Nomura (Japan) Y Shimogami	26	21	22
(Malaysia) J Arif (Malaysia) Yap R K	28	18	20
PFR	(Malaysia) Kang K X (Malaysia) A Tai	12	6^{r}
2	(Malaysia) A Chia (Malaysia) Soh W Y	21	11

Second round
(Chinese Taipei) Lee J-h (Chinese Taipei) Yang P-hs	21	17	21
6	(Malaysia) Goh S F (Malaysia) N Izzuddin	14	21	14
(Japan) T Nomura (Japan) Y Shimogami	9	21
2	(Malaysia) A Chia (Malaysia) Soh W Y	21	23

Quarter-finals
(Chinese Taipei) Lee J-h (Chinese Taipei) Yang P-hs	19	14
2	(Malaysia) A Chia (Malaysia) Soh W Y	21	21

== Women's doubles ==
=== Seeds ===
1. (China) Liu Shengshu / Tan Ning (champions)
2. (Malaysia) Pearly Tan / Thinaah Muralitharan (semi-finals)
3. (South Korea) Kim Hye-jeong / Kong Hee-yong (second round)
4. (China) Jia Yifan / Zhang Shuxian (withdrew)
5. (Japan) Yuki Fukushima / Mayu Matsumoto (final)
6. (South Korea) Baek Ha-na / Lee So-hee (semi-finals)
7. (China) Li Yijing / Luo Xumin (quarter-finals)
8. (Chinese Taipei) Hsieh Pei-shan / Hung En-tzu (quarter-finals)

=== Finals ===
Semi-finals
1	(China) Liu Shengshu (China) Tan Ning	21	17	21
6	(South Korea) Baek Ha-na (South Korea) Lee So-hee	12	21	14
5	(Japan) Yuki Fukushima (Japan) Mayu Matsumoto	21	21
2	(Malaysia) Pearly Tan (Malaysia) Thinaah Muralitharan	16	13

Final
1	(China) Liu Shengshu (China) Tan Ning	21	21
5	(Japan) Yuki Fukushima (Japan) Mayu Matsumoto	11	18

=== Top half ===
==== Section 1 ====
First round
1	(China) Liu SS (China) Tan N	19	21	21
(Indonesia) L T Mayasari (Indonesia) A C Pratiwi	21	11	9
(Japan) A Igarashi (Japan) C Shida	21	21
(Poland) P Cybulska (Poland) K Marczak	3	11
7	(China) Li YJ (China) Luo XM	21	21
(United States) F Corbett (United States) J Gai	12	8
(India) T Jolly (India) G Gopichand	21	21
(Thailand) O Jongsathapornpan (Thailand) S Suwachai	15	11

Second round
1	(China) Liu SS (China) Tan N	21	10	21
(Japan) A Igarashi (Japan) C Shida	9	21	19
7	(China) Li YJ (China) Luo XM	20	24	23
(India) T Jolly (India) G Gopichand	22	22	21

Quarter-finals
1	(China) Liu SS (China) Tan N	21	21
7	(China) Li YJ (China) Luo XM	14	15

==== Section 2 ====
First round
6	(South Korea) Baek H-n (South Korea) Lee S-h	21	21
(India) G Rawat (India) M Rawat	5	8
(Japan) R Hiramoto (Japan) K Ishikawa	21	24	20
(Scotland) J MacPherson (Scotland) C Torrance	13	26	22
SWM	(Hong Kong) Yeung N T (Hong Kong) Yeung P L	21	18	17
(Chinese Taipei) Hsu Y-c (Chinese Taipei) Sung Y-h	11	21	21
(Hong Kong) Lui L L (Hong Kong) Tsang H Y	21	20	24
(India) P Konjengbam (India) S Mishra	11	22	22

Second round
6	(South Korea) Baek H-n (South Korea) Lee S-h	21	21
(Scotland) J MacPherson (Scotland) C Torrance	8	5
(Chinese Taipei) Hsu Y-c (Chinese Taipei) Sung Y-h	21	12	21
(Hong Kong) Lui L L (Hong Kong) Tsang H Y	11	21	16

Quarter-finals
6	(South Korea) Baek H-n (South Korea) Lee S-h	21	21
(Chinese Taipei) Hsu Y-c (Chinese Taipei) Sung Y-h	19	9

=== Bottom half ===
==== Section 3 ====
First round
(Japan) N Hara (Japan) R Kiyose	21	21
(India) R Panda (India) S Panda	8	18
(Chinese Taipei) Chang C-h (Chinese Taipei) Yang C-t	8	10
5	(Japan) Y Fukushima (Japan) M Matsumoto	21	21
(South Korea) Jeong N-e (South Korea) Lee Y-w	21	21
(Chinese Taipei) Hsu Y-h (Chinese Taipei) Lin J-y	8	18
(Chinese Taipei) Lin X-m (Chinese Taipei) Wang Y-q	16	16
3	(South Korea) Kim H-j (South Korea) Kong H-y	21	21

Second round
(Japan) N Hara (Japan) R Kiyose	11	12
5	(Japan) Y Fukushima (Japan) M Matsumoto	21	21
(South Korea) Jeong N-e (South Korea) Lee Y-w	21	21
3	(South Korea) Kim H-j (South Korea) Kong H-y	14	15

Quarter-finals
5	(Japan) Y Fukushima (Japan) M Matsumoto	21	21
(South Korea) Jeong N-e (South Korea) Lee Y-w	10	11

==== Section 4 ====
First round
(Ukraine) P Buhrova (Ukraine) Y Kantemyr	24	21
(Canada) J Dent (Canada) C Lai	22	19
(Malaysia) Ong X Y (Malaysia) C Ting	17	15
8	(Chinese Taipei) Hsieh P-s (Chinese Taipei) Hung E-t	21	21
PFR	(India) A Bhat (India) S Gautam	18	16
(France) M Lambert (France) C Pognante	21	21
(India) K Selvam (India) S Singhi	18	6
2	(Malaysia) P Tan (Malaysia) Thinaah M	21	21

Second round
(Ukraine) P Buhrova (Ukraine) Y Kantemyr	11	15
8	(Chinese Taipei) Hsieh P-s (Chinese Taipei) Hung E-t	21	21
(France) M Lambert (France) C Pognante	7	21
2	(Malaysia) P Tan (Malaysia) Thinaah M	21	23

Quarter-finals
8	(Chinese Taipei) Hsieh P-s (Chinese Taipei) Hung E-t	16	10
2	(Malaysia) P Tan (Malaysia) Thinaah M	21	21

== Mixed doubles ==
=== Seeds ===
1. (China) Feng Yanzhe / Huang Dongping (semi-finals)
2. (China) Jiang Zhenbang / Wei Yaxin (semi-finals)
3. (Thailand) Dechapol Puavaranukroh / Supissara Paewsampran (champions)
4. (Malaysia) Chen Tang Jie / Toh Ee Wei (first round)
5. (France) Thom Gicquel / Delphine Delrue (quarter-finals)
6. (China) Guo Xinwa / Chen Fanghui (quarter-finals)
7. (Hong Kong) Tang Chun Man / Tse Ying Suet (second round)
8. (Malaysia) Goh Soon Huat / Shevon Jemie Lai (quarter-finals)

=== Finals ===
Semi-finals
1	(China) Feng Yanzhe (China) Huang Dongping	21	19	16
3	(Thailand) Dechapol Puavaranukroh (Thailand) Supissara Paewsampran	16	21	21
(Denmark) Mathias Christiansen (Denmark) Alexandra Bøje	16	21	21
2	(China) Jiang Zhenbang (China) Wei Yaxin	21	14	14

Final
3	(Thailand) Dechapol Puavaranukroh (Thailand) Supissara Paewsampran	19	25	21
(Denmark) Mathias Christiansen (Denmark) Alexandra Bøje	21	23	18

=== Top half ===
==== Section 1 ====
First round
1	(China) Feng YZ (China) Huang DP	20	21	21
(Denmark) M Vestergaard (Denmark) C Busch	22	13	16
(Malaysia) J Wong (Malaysia) Lai P J	21	23
(Japan) Y Watanabe (Japan) M Taguchi	10	21
8	(Malaysia) Goh S H (Malaysia) S J Lai	21	21
(Chinese Taipei) Wu G-x (Chinese Taipei) Lee C-h	17	17
(Chinese Taipei) Chen C-k (Chinese Taipei) Hsu Y-h	16	17
(Thailand) R Oupthong (Thailand) J Sudjaipraparat	21	21

Second round
1	(China) Feng YZ (China) Huang DP	18	21	21
(Malaysia) J Wong (Malaysia) Lai P J	21	17	10
8	(Malaysia) Goh S H (Malaysia) S J Lai	17	21	21
(Thailand) R Oupthong (Thailand) J Sudjaipraparat	21	15	6

Quarter-finals
1	(China) Feng YZ (China) Huang DP	21	19	21
8	(Malaysia) Goh S H (Malaysia) S J Lai	19	21	18

==== Section 2 ====
First round
3	(Thailand) D Puavaranukroh (Thailand) S Paewsampran	17	21	22
(Malaysia) Hoo P R (Malaysia) Cheng S Y	21	16	20
(Chinese Taipei) Ye H-w (Chinese Taipei) N G Chan	21	21
(Japan) A Koga (Japan) N Saito	19	17
5	(France) T Gicquel (France) D Delrue	21	21
(Denmark) J Toft (Denmark) A Magelund	17	14
(India) D Rawat (India) K. Maneesha	9	10
(Japan) H Midorikawa (Japan) N Matsuyama	21	21

Second round
3	(Thailand) D Puavaranukroh (Thailand) S Paewsampran	21	21
(Chinese Taipei) Ye H-w (Chinese Taipei) N G Chan	18	15
5	(France) T Gicquel (France) D Delrue	20	21	21
(Japan) H Midorikawa (Japan) N Matsuyama	22	4	10

Quarter-finals
3	(Thailand) D Puavaranukroh (Thailand) S Paewsampran	21	21
5	(France) T Gicquel (France) D Delrue	6	15

=== Bottom half ===
==== Section 3 ====
First round
(Germany) M Seidel (Germany) T P Nguyen	21	21
(India) R Kapoor (India) R Gadde	19	14
(France) J Maio (France) L Palermo
6	(China) Guo XW (China) Chen FH	w	/	o
(Denmark) M Christiansen (Denmark) A Bøje	w	/	o
(United States) Chen Z-y (United States) F Corbett
(China) Cheng X (China) Zhang C	21	21
4	(Malaysia) Chen T J (Malaysia) Toh E W	16	19

Second round
(Germany) M Seidel (Germany) T P Nguyen	11	12
6	(China) Guo XW (China) Chen FH	21	21
(Denmark) M Christiansen (Denmark) A Bøje	21	21
(China) Cheng X (China) Zhang C	17	17

Quarter-finals
6	(China) Guo XW (China) Chen FH	13	21	11
(Denmark) M Christiansen (Denmark) A Bøje	21	14	21

==== Section 4 ====
First round
(Japan) Y Shimogami (Japan) S Hobara	21	21
(India) A Surya (India) A Pramuthesh	15	7
(Scotland) A Dunn (Scotland) J MacPherson	19	13
7	(Hong Kong) Tang C M (Hong Kong) Tse Y S	21	21
(India) D Kapila (India) T Crasto	15	14
(Thailand) P Teeraratsakul (Thailand) S Taerattanachai	21	21
(United States) P Smith (United States) J Gai	8	18
2	(China) Jiang ZB (China) Wei YX	21	21

Second round
(Japan) Y Shimogami (Japan) S Hobara	21	21
7	(Hong Kong) Tang C M (Hong Kong) Tse Y S	19	11
(Thailand) P Teeraratsakul (Thailand) S Taerattanachai	15	17
2	(China) Jiang ZB (China) Wei YX	21	21

Quarter-finals
(Japan) Y Shimogami (Japan) S Hobara	23	18
2	(China) Jiang ZB (China) Wei YX	25	21

Preceded by 2026 Malaysia Open	BWF World Tour; 2026 BWF season	Succeeded by 2026 Indonesia Masters
