= Minoru Yoneyama =

Japanese businessman (1924–2019)

Minoru Yoneyama (米山 稔, Yoneyama Minoru, 15 October 1924 – 11 November 2019) was a Japanese businessman who founded the sports-equipment company Yonex, one of the world's top producers of tennis and badminton rackets as well as golf clubs. He was awarded the President's Medal by the Badminton World Federation in 2015.

== Biography ==
Yoneyama was born on 15 October 1924 in Koshiji, Niigata (now part of Nagaoka), Japan. During World War II, he served in the Imperial Japanese Army in a suicide unit whose task was to ram boats filled with explosives into American ships. However, he did not receive an order to execute a mission before his capture by the Americans in Okinawa, where he was subsequently held in a prison camp.

After his release at the end of the war, Yoneyama made floats for recreational fishing starting in 1946. When business slumped, in 1957 he began making rackets for badminton, which was becoming popular in Japan at the time. He incorporated Yoneyama Company the following year. In 1963, the company's racket factory burned down, but Yoneyama was able to set up a new plant and resume production in only three days.

The company branched into tennis rackets in 1969 and golf clubs in 1982. It was renamed as Yonex in 1982 and relocated to Tokyo. Yonex signed contracts with some of the world's top tennis players such as Billie Jean King, Martina Navratilova and Kimiko Date.

As the company diversified under Yoneyama's leadership, he still paid close attention to badminton, inking a sponsorship agreement with the Badminton World Federation (BWF) in 1988 and signing badminton greats such as Rudy Hartono and Poul-Erik Høyer Larsen as brand ambassadors. The company became one of the world's top producers of tennis and badminton rackets and golf clubs.

In 2015, Yoneyama was awarded the BWF President's Medal for his "extraordinary services to the sport". The medal was presented by Høyer, who was by then the president of BWF.

Yoneyama died on 11 November 2019 at a hospital in Niigata, aged 95.
