= Yonex =

Japanese sports equipment manufacturing company

Yonex Co., Ltd.

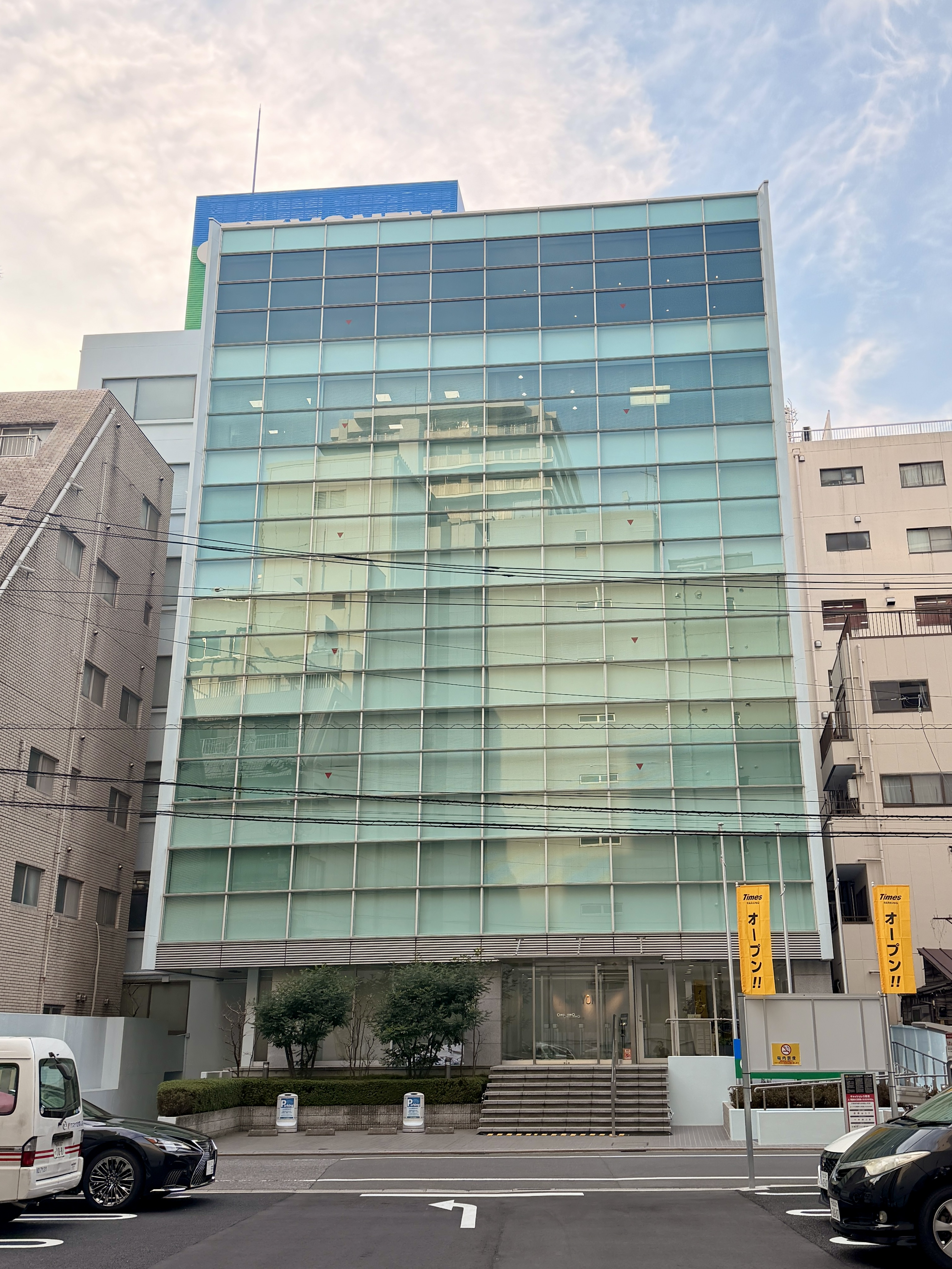
- Yonex's headquarters in Bunkyo, Tokyo
- Native name: ヨネックス株式会社
- Romanized name: Yonekkusu Kabushiki-gaisha
- Type: Public
- Traded as: TYO: 7906
- Industry: Sports equipment
- Founded: 1946; 80 years ago (incorporated in 1958)
- Founder: Minoru Yoneyama
- Headquarters: Bunkyo, Tokyo, Japan
- Area served: Worldwide
- Key people: Ben Yoneyama, Chairman; Alyssa Yoneyama, President
- Products: Rackets, tennis balls, shuttlecocks, golf clubs, athletic shoes, apparel, bags, accessories
- Revenue: ¥1636.43 billion (2026)
- Net income: ¥12.92 billion (2026)
- Subsidiaries: Yonex Corporation; Yonex UK Ltd.; Yonex GmbH; Yonex Taiwan Co., Ltd.; Yonex Canada Ltd.; Yonex Golf China Co., LTD
- Website: yonex.com

Yonex Co., Ltd. (ヨネックス株式会社, Yonekkusu Kabushiki-gaisha) is a Japanese sports equipment manufacturing company. Yonex produces equipment and apparel for tennis, badminton, golf, running, and snowboarding.

Its range of products manufactured and commercialized includes equipment for badminton and tennis (rackets, shuttlecocks, balls, bags) and golf (clubs, bags). Yonex also produces athletic shoes and apparel including T-shirts, jackets, skirts, shorts, hoodies, leggings and hats.

== History ==
The company was founded in 1946 by Minoru Yoneyama as a producer of wooden floats for fishing nets. The company was later forced out of this market because of the invention of plastic floats. This led to a commitment by Yoneyama to never again be left behind by technological advancements.

In 1957, Yoneyama began to make badminton racquets for other brands. By 1961, the first Yoneyama-branded racquet was introduced, and within another two years an export company was created for the worldwide distribution. After the company began to make aluminium badminton racquets in 1969, it found that the same technology could be applied to the tennis racket which the company introduced in 1971. The company began to experiment with graphite shafts for both types of rackets and found that these would also be useful for golf clubs.

In 1982 Yonex came out with the new oversized tennis racquet in the REX-series with the R-7 and R-10 racquets. At that time Martina Navratilova played with the R-7 and was very successful. One year later, the new series Rexking was developed with the R-22. Navratilova subsequently used the white RQ 180 widebody frame until the early 1990s.

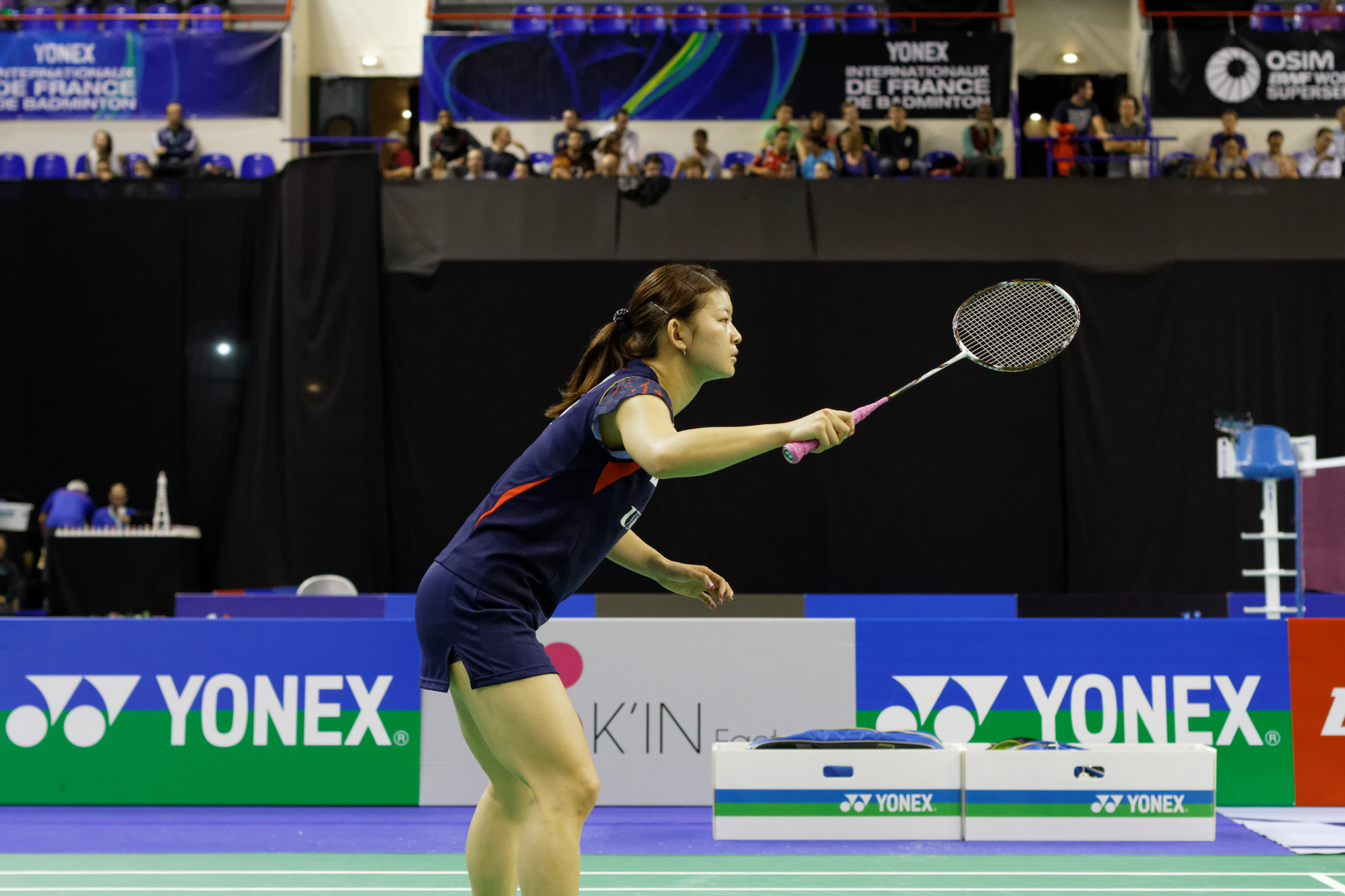
Yonex advertising banners at the 2013 badminton French Open

Finding a growing market, the Yonex Corporation (a wholly owned subsidiary) was established in Torrance, California, in July 1983. In 1992 Yonex introduced the widebody badminton racket, the "Isometric 500", a racquet that was much less "tear drop"-shaped than previous ones. The more "square" head gave it a much larger striking surface, which provides a larger "sweet spot" to hit the shuttle. It led other manufacturers to follow suit in "square-head" or isometric designs.

The parent company was listed on the Tokyo Stock Exchange in 1994. Yonex describes itself as the world leader in golf, tennis and badminton equipment. Yonex provides clothing for national badminton associations around the world, such as the Malaysian Badminton Association, Badminton Scotland, Badminton England, Badminton Ireland, and Badminton Wales. Yonex has also been teaming up with OCBC (Orange County Badminton Club) since 2007 to host the annual U.S. Open Grand Prix Badminton Championships.

Yonex has become the dominant corporate player in badminton. Yonex sponsors the All England Open Badminton Championships and is a partner of the Badminton World Federation which organizes the World Championships. Upwards of 80% of competitive players use their racquets, as it is the preferred choice amongst professionals. Yonex is significant in the tennis and golf industries as well and is a major sponsor of professional athletes in all three sports.

In addition to badminton and tennis, Yonex also supply sporting apparel goods for two football clubs in J.League, namely Kashiwa Reysol and Avispa Fukuoka.

== Controversies ==
- Yonex signed a contract with the Chinese Taipei Badminton Association regarding national team jersey sponsorship in 2014. However, Yonex would often send players clothing and shoes to wear a few days before major tournaments, with the shoes unfit for players, as players had blisters and bruises from playing in them.
- In May 2016, Yonex acted in a way that was ultra vires when criticizing the Taiwan national team players who had violated the dress code. Yonex sent official documents to the Chinese Taipei Badminton Association threatening to sue the national team head coaches if the Association did not provide a reasonable answer.
- During the 2016 Summer Olympics, Yonex provided unfit shoes to non-contract badminton player Tai Tzu-ying. This forced Tai to wear other shoes made by her personal sponsor brand, Victor, without any logo. This event caused a controversy as the Chinese Taipei Badminton Association was going to punish Tai based on Yonex's pressing.
- After the Tai incident, five other badminton players found themselves in the same situation and were punished. For example, Yonex was dissatisfied that badminton player Liao Kuan-hao used his personal sponsor racquet and as a result Yonex asked the Chinese Taipei Badminton Association to fine Liao and force him to be suspended for six months. In August 2016, the Chinese Taipei Badminton Association held a board meeting to resolve the situation. The meeting resulted in three key decisions: no punishment will be enforced on the “player”; to accept the resignation of Chairman Tsai Hung-peng for the controversy; to remove the word “Shoes” and “Racquets” from the contract with Yonex.
- For the 2024 Summer Olympics, Yonex launched a new Olympic official kit for Olympic Council of Malaysia (OCM) in 23rd of June 2024. However, it received heavy criticism and bashed by sports fans, calling the design "ugly", "cheap-looking" and questioned the decision of using off-looking Malaysia flag. In response, OCM agreed to redesign the attire to ensure it represents the nation's status and expectations. Datuk Hamidin Mohd Amin, Head of mission of OCM, explained that the confusion of the Malaysia flag is because the flag is represented by the official OCM logo. He also explained that the reason to the attire colour changes from orange to yellow is "to evoke the relentless pursue of medals for the nation at the prestigious global sporting event."
