= 2027 in sports =

2027 in sports describes the year's events in world sport. The main sporting events for 2027 are the 2027 Men's Rugby World Cup in Australia, 2027 Cricket World Cup in South Africa, Zimbabwe and Namibia and the 2027 FIFA Women's World Cup in Brazil. In women's rugby union, there will be a new British & Irish Lions tour which will be known as the Women's British & Irish Lions. The inaugural edition of the tour will be held in New Zealand.

== Competitions by month ==
=== January ===
Date	Sport	Venue/Event	Status	Winner/s
26 December–5	Ice Hockey	(Canada) 2027 World Junior Ice Hockey Championships	International	
1	Ice Hockey	(United States) 2027 NHL Winter Classic	Domestic	
13–31	Handball	(Germany) 2027 World Men's Handball Championship	International	
15–25	Winter sports	(China) 2027 Winter World University Games	International	
17–23	Sailing	(Brazil) 2027 Sailing World Championships	International	
17–31	Tennis	(Australia) 2027 Australian Open	International	
22–24	Indoor rowing	(Germany) 2027 European Rowing Indoor Championships	Continental	
25	American football	(United States) 2027 College Football Playoff National Championship	Domestic	

=== February ===
Date	Sport	Venue/Event	Status	Winner/s
7	Ice Hockey	(United States) 2027 NHL All-Star Game	Domestic	
14	American football	(United States) Super Bowl LXI	Domestic	
20	Ice Hockey	(United States) 2027 NHL Stadium Series	Domestic	
21	Auto Racing	(United States) 2027 Daytona 500	Domestic	
21	Basketball	(United States) 2027 NBA All-Star Game	Domestic	
22–27	Archery	(Turkey) 2027 European Archery Indoor Championships	Continental	
24–28	Figure skating	(Bulgaria) 2027 World Junior Figure Skating Championships	International	
24–3 March	Winter sports	(Sweden) FIS Nordic World Ski Championships 2027	International	

=== March ===
Date	Sport	Venue/Event	Status	Winner/s
3–14	Tennis	(United States) 2027 Indian Wells Open	International	
4–7	Athletics	(Spain) 2027 European Athletics Indoor Championships	Continental	
6–20	Sport shooting	(Spain) 2027 European 10 m Events Championships	Continental	
7	Marathon	(Japan) 2027 Tokyo Marathon (WMM #1)	International	
11–14	Golf	(United States) 2027 Players Championship	International	
12–14	Formula racing	2027 Bahrain Grand Prix (F1) (#1)	International	
16–5 April	Basketball	(United States) 2027 NCAA Division I men's basketball tournament	Domestic	
17–28	Tennis	(United States) 2027 Miami Open	International	
19–4 April	Basketball	(United States) 2027 NCAA Division I women's basketball tournament	Domestic	
19–21	Formula racing	(Saudi Arabia) 2027 Saudi Arabian Grand Prix (F1) (#2)	International	
24–28	Gymnastics	(Italy) 2027 Acrobatic Gymnastics European Championships	Continental	
25–26 September	Baseball	(United States) 2027 Major League Baseball season	Domestic	
26–4 April	Curling	(Canada) 2027 World Men's Curling Championship	International	
TBD	Cricket	(India) 2027 Indian Premier League season	Domestic	

=== April ===
Date	Sport	Venue/Event	Status	Winner/s
2–3	Synchronized skating	(United Kingdom) 2027 Synchronized Skating World Championships	International	
2–4	Formula racing	(Australia) 2027 Australian Grand Prix (F1) (#3)	International	
5–11	Softball	(Australia) 2027 Women's Softball World Cup	International	
8–11	Golf	(United States) 2027 Masters Tournament	International	
9–11	Formula racing	(Japan) 2027 Japanese Grand Prix (F1) (#4)	International	
16–18	Formula racing	(China) 2027 Chinese Grand Prix (F1) (#5)	International	
19	Marathon	(United States) 2027 Boston Marathon (WMM #2)	International	
22–25	Golf	(United States) 2027 Chevron Championship	International	
25	Marathon	(United Kingdom) 2027 London Marathon (WMM #3)	International	
29–1 May	American Football	(United States) 2027 NFL draft	Domestic	
30–2 May	Formula racing	(United States) 2027 Miami Grand Prix (F1) (#6)	International	

=== May ===
Date	Sport	Venue/Event	Status	Winner/s
1	Horse Racing	(United States) 2027 Kentucky Derby	International	
4–16	Tennis	(Italy) 2027 Italian Open	International	
15–16	Rowing	(Croatia) 2027 European Rowing Under 19 Championships	Continental	
20–23	Golf	(United States) 2027 PGA Championship	International	
21–23	Formula racing	(Canada) 2027 Canadian Grand Prix (F1) (#7)	International	
22–30	Table tennis	(Kazakhstan) 2027 World Table Tennis Championships	International	
23	Horse Racing	(United States) 2027 Preakness Stakes	Domestic	
26	Association Football	(Germany) 2027 UEFA Europa League final	Continental	
30–13 June	Tennis	(France) 2027 French Open	International	

=== June ===
Date	Sport	Venue/Event	Status	Winner/s
2	Association Football	(Turkey) 2027 UEFA Conference League final	Continental	
3–6	Golf	(United States) 2027 U.S. Women's Open	International	
4–6	Formula racing	2027 Monaco Grand Prix (F1) (#8)	International	
5	Horse Racing	(United States) 2027 Belmont Stakes	International	
5	Association Football	(Spain) 2027 UEFA Champions League final	Continental	
6–11	Beach handball	(Lithuania) 2027 European Beach Handball Championships	Continental	
17–20	Golf	(United States) 2027 U.S. Open	International	
16–27	Basketball	(Belgium) / (Finland) / (Sweden) / (Lithuania) EuroBasket Women 2027	Continental	
18–20	Formula racing	(Portugal) 2027 Portuguese Grand Prix (F1) (#9)	International	
18–26	Softball	(Czech Republic) 2027 U-18 Men's Softball World Cup	International	
24	Basketball	(United States) 2027 NBA draft	Domestic	
25	Ice Hockey	(United States) 2027 NHL draft	Domestic	
24–25 July	Association Football	(Brazil) 2027 FIFA Women's World Cup	International	
26–4 July	Basketball	(Czech Republic) 2027 FIBA Under-19 Basketball World Cup	International	
26–18 July	Aquatics	(Hungary) 2027 World Aquatics Championships	International	
28–8 July	Softball	(United States) 2027 U-15 Women's Softball World Cup	International	
28–11 July	Tennis	(United Kingdom) 2027 Wimbledon Championships	International	

=== July ===
Date	Sport	Venue/Event	Status	Winner/s
2–4	Formula racing	(United Kingdom) 2027 British Grand Prix (F1) (#10)	International	
2–25	Road bicycle racing	2027 Tour de France	International	
3–11	Basketball	(El Salvador) 2027 FIBA Women's AmeriCup	Regional	
5–10	Softball	(Czech Republic) 2027 U-18 Women's Softball European Championship	Continental	
9–11	Formula racing	(Australia) 2027 Austrian Grand Prix (F1) (#11)	International	
10–18	Basketball	(China) 2027 FIBA Under-19 Women's Basketball World Cup	International	
10–18	Sailing	(Italy) 2027 America's Cup	International	
11–18	Basketball	(Philippines) 2027 FIBA Women's Asia Cup	Continental	
12–17	Softball	(Czech Republic) 2027 Men's Softball European Championship	Continental	
13	Baseball	(United States) 2027 Major League Baseball All-Star Game	Domestic	
15–18	Golf	(United Kingdom) 2027 Open Championship	International	
22–8 August	Multi-sport	(Peru) 2027 Pan American Games	Regional	
19–25	Baseball	(Chinese Taipei) (United States) 2027 Women's Baseball World Cup	International	
20–1 August	Bowls	(England) 2027 World Bowls Championships	International	
23–25	Formula racing	(Belgium) 2027 Belgian Grand Prix (F1) (#12)	International	
23–1 August	Basketball	2027 Women's Afrobasket	Continental	
25–31	Softball	(Germany) 2027 Women's Softball European Championship	Continental	
28–8 August	Field hockey	(England) 2027 Men's EuroHockey Championship	Continental	
28–8 August	Field hockey	(England) 2027 Women's EuroHockey Championship	Continental	
30–1 Aug	Formula racing	(Hungary) 2027 Hungarian Grand Prix (F1) (#13)	International	

=== August ===
Date	Sport	Venue/Event	Status	Winner/s
1–12	Multi-sport	(South Korea) 2027 Summer World University Games	International	
1–13	Tennis	(Canada) 2027 Canadian Open	International	
11-15	Paddlesport	(Hungary) 2027 Sprint and Para Paddle World Championships	International	
12–22	Tennis	(United States) 2027 Cincinnati Open	International	
12–29	Golf	(United States) 2027 FedEx Cup Playoffs	International	
19–29	Baseball	(United States) 2027 Little League World Series	Domestic	
20–5 September	Volleyball	(United States) (Canada) 2027 FIVB Women's Volleyball World Cup	International	
23–28	Softball	(Czech Republic) 2027 U-23 Men's Softball European Championship	Continental	
23–29	Rowing	(Switzerland) 2027 World Rowing Championships	International	
27–12 September	Basketball	(Qatar) 2027 FIBA Basketball World Cup	International	
29	Marathon	(Australia) 2027 Sydney Marathon (WMM #4)	International	
30–12 September	Tennis	(United States) 2027 US Open	International	

=== September ===
Date	Sport	Venue/Event	Status	Winner/s
3–5	Formula racing	(Italy) 2027 Italian Grand Prix (F1) (#14)		
4–12	Baseball	(Germany) 2027 Baseball European Championship	Continental	
4–11 December	American Football	(United States) 2027 NCAA Division I FBS season	Domestic	
4–25	Rugby union	2027 British & Irish Lions Women's tour to New Zealand	International	
7-12	Paddlesport	(Spain) 2027 Slalom Paddle World Championships	International	
9–9 January	American Football	(United States) 2027 NFL season	Domestic	
10–12	Formula racing	(Spain) 2027 Spanish Grand Prix (F1) (#15)	International	
10–19	Athletics	(China) 2027 World Athletics Championships	International	
10–26	Volleyball	(Poland) 2027 FIVB Men's Volleyball World Cup	International	
11–19	Wrestling	(United States) 2027 World Wrestling Championships	International	
17–19	Golf	(Republic of Ireland) 2027 Ryder Cup	International	
17–26	Baseball	(China) 2027 U-18 Baseball World Cup	International	
17–29	Multi-sport	(Malaysia) 2027 SEA Games	Regional	
20–27	Archery	(Colombia) 2027 World Archery Championships	International	
24–26	Formula racing	2027 Azerbaijan Grand Prix (F1) (#16)	International	
26	Marathon	(Germany) 2027 Berlin Marathon (WMM #5)	International	

=== October ===
Date	Sport	Venue/Event	Status	Winner/s
1–3	Formula racing	(Turkey) 2027 Turkish Grand Prix (F1) (#17)	International	
1–13 November	Rugby union	(Australia) 2027 Rugby World Cup	International	
8–10	Formula racing	2027 Singapore Grand Prix (F1) (#18)	International	
10	Marathon	(United States) 2027 Chicago Marathon (WMM #6)	Domestic	
22	Baseball	(United States) 2027 World Series	Domestic	
4–21 November	Cricket	(South Africa) / (Namibia) / (Zimbabwe) 2027 Cricket World Cup	International	
16–24	Multi-sport	(Chile) 2027 Special Olympics World Summer Games	International	
22–24	Formula racing	2027 United States Grand Prix (F1) (#19)	International	
22–24	Judo	(United Arab Emirates) 2027 Judo Grand Slam Abu Dhabi (GS)	International	
29–31	Formula racing	2027 Mexico City Grand Prix (F1) (#20)	International	

=== November ===
Date	Sport	Venue/Event	Status	Winner/s
5–6	Horse racing	(United States) 2027 Breeders Cup	Domestic	
5–7	Formula racing	(Brazil) 2027 São Paulo Grand Prix (F1) (#21)	International	
5–7	Judo	(Korea) 2027 Judo Grand Prix Zagreb (GP)	International	
7	Marathon	(United States) 2027 New York Marathon (WMM #7)	Domestic	
7	Canadian Football	(Canada) 114th Grey Cup	Domestic	
19–21	Formula Racing	(United States) 2027 Las Vegas Grand Prix (F1) (#22)	International	
30–19 December	Handball	(Hungary) 2027 World Women's Handball Championship	International	

=== December ===
Date	Sport	Venue/Event	Status	Winner/s
3–5	Formula racing	2027 Qatar Grand Prix (F1) (#23)	International	
3–5	Judo	(Japan) 2027 Judo Grand Slam Tokyo (GS)	International	
10–12	Formula racing	(United Arab Emirates) 2027 Abu Dhabi Grand Prix (F1) (#24)	International	
12–19	Table tennis	(Paraguay) 2027 ITTF World Youth Championships	International	
23–21 January 2028	Association Football	(Saudi Arabia) 2027 AFC Asian Cup	Continental	
26–5 January 2028	Ice Hockey	(Finland) 2028 World Junior Ice Hockey Championships	International	

== Multi-sport events ==
- 15 – 25 January: 2027 Winter World University Games in (China) Changchung
- 23 July – 8 August: 2027 Pan American Games in (Peru) Lima
- 1 – 12 August: 2027 Summer World University Games in (South Korea) Chungcheong
- 24 July – 8 August: 2027 Pacific Games in Tahiti
- 22 August – 1 September: 2027 Parapan American Games in (Peru) Lima
- 23 August – 1 September: 2027 Jeux de la Francophonie in (Armenia) Yerevan
- 18 – 29 September: 2027 SEA Games in (Malaysia) Along Kuala Lumpur,8 cities are scheduled to host the event
- October: 2027 ASEAN Para Games in (Malaysia) Along Kuala Lumpur,8 cities are scheduled to host the event
- 16 – 24 October: 2027 Special Olympics World Summer Games in (Chile) Santiago
- 27 October – 4 November: 2027 Commonwealth Youth Games in Malta
- 20 January – 7 February: 2027 African Games in (Egypt) Cairo
- 16 – 27 June: 2027 European Games in (Turkey) Istanbul
- 2027 European Para Championships Switzerland
- 11–18 August: 2027 World Dwarf Games in (Australia) Gold Coast
- 14–24 January: 2027 Winter Deaflympics in (Austria) Innsbruck
- 1–8 August: 2027 World Transplant Games in (Belgium) Leuven

== American football ==
=== National Football League ===
- 14 February: Super Bowl LXI in Inglewood, California
- 29 April – 1 May: 2027 NFL draft in (Washington, D.C.) Washington D.C.
- 9 September – January 9, 2028: 2027 NFL season

=== United Football League ===
- March 26 – May 30: 2027 UFL season
- June 12: 2027 United Bowl in TBD

== Aquatics ==
- 26 June – 18 July: 2027 World Aquatics Championships in (Hungary) Budapest

== Association football ==
- TBD: 2027 FIFA U-17 World Cup Qatar
- TBD: 2027 FIFA U-17 Women's World Cup Morocco
- 17 September–9 October: 2027 FIFA U-20 World Cup Azerbaijan and Uzbekistan
- 19 June–17 July: 2027 Africa Cup of Nations in Kenya, Tanzania and Uganda
- 24 June–25 July: 2027 FIFA Women's World Cup in Brazil
- June 2026 and May 2027: 2026–27 UEFA Champions League
- 23 December–21 January 2028: 2027 AFC Asian Cup in Saudi Arabia

=== CONMEBOL ===
==== Club competitions ====
TBA

=== Beach soccer ===
- TBD: 2027 FIFA Beach Soccer World Cup

== Athletics ==
- September 10–19: 2027 World Athletics Championships in Beijing, China

=== 2026–27 World Athletics Cross Country Tour ===
Gold

Sliver

Bronze

== Badminton ==
=== Continental championships ===
- January 6 – 10 : 2027 European Mixed Team Badminton Championships in Tallinn, Estonia
- January 11 – 14 : 2027 All Africa Mixed Team Championships in Algiers, Algeria
- January 12 – 17 : 2027 Badminton Asia Mixed Team Championships in Qingdao, China
- January 15 – 17 : 2027 African Badminton Championships in Algiers, Algeria
- April 6 – 10 : 2027 Pan Am Badminton Championships in Guatemala City, Guatemala
- April 6 – 11 : 2027 Badminton Asia Championships in Ningbo, China
- December 12 – 14 : 2027 Oceania Men's & Women's Team Badminton Championships in New Zealand
- December 15 – 19 : 2027 Oceania Badminton Championships in New Zealand

=== BWF World Tour ===
==== BWF World Tour Finals ====
- December 1 – 5 : 2027 BWF World Tour Finals

==== Super 1000 ====
- January 21 – 31 : 2027 Malaysia Open
- March 4 – 14 : 2027 All England Open
- May 27 – June 6 : 2027 Indonesia Open
- September 2 – 12 : 2027 China Open
- October 14 – 24 : 2027 Denmark Open

== Baseball ==
=== WBSC ===
- TBD: 2027 WBSC Premier12

=== Major League Baseball ===
- March 25–26 September: 2027 Major League Baseball season
- 11–12 July: 2027 Major League Baseball draft in Chicago, Illinois
- 13 July: 2027 Major League Baseball All-Star Game at Wrigley Field in Chicago, Illinois
- 22 October: 2027 World Series

=== 2027 Little League World Series ===
- 19–29 August: Little League World Series at Little League Volunteer Stadium and Howard J. Lamade Stadium, both in South Williamsport, Pennsylvania

== Basketball ==
- 16 – 27 June: EuroBasket Women 2027 in Belgium/ Finland/ Sweden/ Lithuania
- 26 June – 4 July: 2027 FIBA Under-19 Basketball World Cup in Czech Republic
- 3 – 11 July: 2027 FIBA Women's AmeriCup in (El Salvador) San Salvador
- 10 – 18 July: 2027 FIBA Under-19 Women's Basketball World Cup in China
- 11 – 18 July: 2027 FIBA Women's Asia Cup in Philippines
- 23 July – 1 August: 2027 Women's Afrobasket
- 27 August – 12 September: 2027 FIBA Basketball World Cup in Qatar

=== National Basketball Association ===
- October 20, 2026 – June 2027 (Finals): 2026–27 NBA season
- February 21: 2027 NBA All-Star Game at the Mortgage Matchup Center in Phoenix, Arizona
- 17 April: 2027 NBA Playoffs
- 24 June: 2027 NBA draft

=== National Collegiate Athletic Association ===
- 16 March – 4 April: 2027 NCAA Division I men's basketball tournament
- 19 March – 3 April: 2027 NCAA Division I women's basketball tournament

== Canadian football ==
=== Canadian Football League ===
- 13 April: 2027 CFL draft
- 14 April: 2027 CFL global draft
- 27 May – 16 October: 2027 CFL season
- 7 November: 114th Grey Cup in Regina, Saskatchewan

=== U Sports ===
- 27 November: 62nd Vanier Cup in Quebec City, Quebec

== Cricket ==
- 4 October – 21 November: 2027 Cricket World Cup in Namibia, South Africa and Zimbabwe

== Cycling ==
=== Road ===
- TBD: 2027 UCI Road World Championships in (France) Haute-Savoie

== Equestrianism ==
=== Horse Racing ===
- 1 May: Kentucky Derby in Churchill Downs
- 15 May: Preakness Stakes in (Maryland) Laurel Park
- 12 June: Belmont Stakes in (New York (state)) Belmont Park
- 5–6 November: Breeders Cup in (California) Santa Ana Park

== Golf ==
=== Men's major golf championships (PGA Tour) ===
- April 8–11: 2027 Masters Tournament at Augusta National Golf Club in Augusta, Georgia
- May 20–23: 2027 PGA Championship in (United States) Texas
- June 17–20: 2027 U.S. Open in (United States) California
- July 15–18: 2027 Open Championship at Royal Birkdale Golf Club in Southport, England
- September 16–19: 2027 Ryder Cup in (Republic of Ireland) County Limerick

=== Women's major golf championships (LPGA Tour) ===
- June 24–27: 2027 Women's PGA Championship in (United States) Maryland –
- June 3–6: 2027 U.S. Women's Open in (United States) Ohio –
- July 8–11: 2027 Evian Championship in Evian Resort Golf Club in Evian-les-Bains, France –
- July 29 – August 1: 2027 Women's British Open at Royal St. George's Golf Club in Sandwich, Kent, England –

=== Senior major golf championships (PGA Tour Champions) ===
- April 15–18: Senior PGA Championship at The Concession Golf Club in Bradenton, Florida – (United States)
- July 1–4: U.S. Senior Open at Oak Tree National in Edmond, Oklahoma – (United States)
- July 22–25: ISPS Handa Senior Open at Gleneagles Hotel (King's Course) at Auchterarder, Scotland –

== Handball ==
- 13 – 31 January: 2027 World Men's Handball Championship in Germany
- 30 November – 19 December: 2027 World Women's Handball Championship in Hungary

== Hockey ==
=== Ice Hockey ===
==== National Hockey League ====
- 29 September 2026 – June 2027: 2026–27 NHL season
- 7 February: 2027 National Hockey League All-Star Game
- 12 April: 2027 Stanley Cup playoffs
- 25 June: 2027 NHL entry draft

== Netball ==
- 28 July – 6 August: 2027 Netball World Cup in (Australia) Sydney

== Rugby ==
=== Rugby union ===
- 4 September – 25 September: 2027 British & Irish Lions Women's tour to New Zealand New Zealand
- 1 October – 13 November: 2027 Rugby World Cup in Australia

== Skiing ==
=== Alpine ===
- TBD: FIS Alpine World Ski Championships 2027 in (Switzerland) Crans-Montana

=== Nordic combined ===
- TBD: FIS Nordic World Ski Championships 2027 in (Sweden) Falun

== Tennis ==
=== Grand Slam ===
- 10–31 January: 2027 Australian Open
- 30 May – 13 June: 2027 French Open
- 28 June – 11 July: 2027 Wimbledon Championships
- 30 August – 12 September: 2027 US Open

== Volleyball ==
=== Volleyball World Cup ===
- 20 August — 5 September: 2027 FIVB Women's Volleyball World Cup in Canada and United States
- 10 — 26 September: 2027 FIVB Men's Volleyball World Cup in Poland

=== Beach Volleyball ===
- 13 — 22 August: 2027 Beach Volleyball World Championships in Netherlands
