= 2026–27 FIS Cross-Country World Cup =

Cross-country skiing competition

Discipline	Men	Women

Stage events

Competition
Edition	46th	46th
Locations	12	12
Individual	29	29
Relay/Team	1	1
Mixed	1	1

The 2026–27 FIS Cross-Country World Cup, organized by the International Ski Federation (FIS) will be the 46th World Cup for men and women as the highest level of international cross-country skiing competitions.

The men's and women's season will start on 27 November 2026 in Ruka, Finland and will conclude on 21 March 2027 in Ulricehamn, Sweden.

The season will take a break in February due to the FIS Nordic World Ski Championships 2027 in Falun, Sweden. This is the second World Cup season in which Russian and Belarusian athletes are eligible to compete as Individual Neutral Athletes (AIN) under FIS regulations after exclusion in the 2021-22 season.

Johannes Høsflot Klæbo from Norway and Jessie Diggins from the United States are the reigning champions from the previous season but Diggins retired following the 2025–26 season and will not defend her title.

== Season overview ==
The World Cup schedule for the 2026–27 season was approved at a meeting in Portorož on 7 May.

== Map of world cup hosts ==
All 12 locations hosting world cup events in this season.

Europe

Period I Period II – Tour de Ski Period III Period IV

== Men ==
=== Calendar ===
Key: C – Classic / F – Freestyle ; MSS – Mass Start / PUR – Pursuit
No.	WC	Date	Place	Discipline	Winner	Second	Third	R.
1		27 November 2026	(Finland) Ruka	10 km C				
2		28 November 2026	(Finland) Ruka	Sprint C				
3		29 November 2026	(Finland) Ruka	20 km F MSS				
4		4 December 2026	(Norway) Trondheim	10 km C				
5		5 December 2026	(Norway) Trondheim	Sprint F				
6		6 December 2026	(Norway) Trondheim	20 km skiathlon				
7		12 December 2026	(Switzerland) Davos	Sprint F				
8		13 December 2026	(Switzerland) Davos	5 km F Heat MSS				
TdS	9	1 January 2027	(France) Les Rousses	Sprint C				
TdS	10	2 January 2027	(France) Les Rousses	20 km C MSS				
TdS	11	3 January 2027	(France) Les Rousses	15 km F Pursuit				
TdS	12	5 January 2027	(Germany) Oberstdorf	15 km C MSS				
TdS	13	6 January 2027	(Germany) Oberstdorf	5 km F Heat MSS				
TdS	14	8 January 2027	(Italy) Val di Fiemme	15 km skiathlon				
TdS	15	9 January 2027	(Italy) Val di Fiemme	Sprint F				
TdS	16	10 January 2027	(Italy) Val di Fiemme	10 km F MSS Climb				
9	21st Tour de Ski Overall (1 January 2027 – 10 January 2027)							
10	17	23 January 2027	(Switzerland) Engadin	Sprint F				
11	18	24 January 2027	(Switzerland) Engadin	20 km F MSS				
12	19	29 January 2027	(Italy) Toblach	10 km F				
13	20	30 January 2027	(Italy) Toblach	Sprint F				
14	21	31 January 2027	(Italy) Toblach	20 km C MSS				
15	22	12 February 2027	(Finland) Lahti	Sprint C				
16	23	13 February 2027	(Finland) Lahti	20 km skiathlon				
17	24	14 February 2027	(Finland) Lahti	10 km C				
FIS Nordic World Ski Championships 2027 (22 February – 7 March • Falun, Sweden)
18	25	13 March 2027	(Norway) Oslo	50 km C MSS				
19	26	16 March 2027	(Norway) Drammen	Sprint C				
20	27	19 March 2027	(Sweden) Ulricehamn	10 km F				
21	28	20 March 2027	(Sweden) Ulricehamn	Sprint F				
22	29	21 March 2027	(Sweden) Ulricehamn	20 km C MSS				
46th FIS World Cup Overall (27 November 2026 – 21 March 2027)								

=== Overall leaders ===
Holder (Note: The leading position in the World Cup belongs to the competitor who has accumulated the most points in the general classification of the series in the competitions held so far. In the event of an equal number of points, the World Cup leader is the competitor who has won more competitions.)	Date	Place(s)	Number of competitions
	27 November 2026	(Finland) Ruka	

=== Standings ===
==== Overall ====
Rank	standings after 0 of 30 events	Points
2
3
4
5
6
7
8
9
10

==== Distance ====
Rank	standings after 0 of 19 events	Points
2
3
4
5
6
7
8
9
10

==== Sprint ====
Rank	standings after 0 of 10 events	Points
2
3
4
5
6
7
8
9
10

==== U23 ====
Rank	standings after 0 of 30 events	Points
2
3
4
5
6
7
8
9
10

==== Bonus ranking ====
Rank	standings after 0 of 14 events	Points
1
2
3
4
5
6
7
8
9
10

==== Prize money ====
Rank	standings after 0 of 36 payouts	CHF
1
2
3
4
5
6
7
8
9
10

== Women ==
=== Calendar ===
Key: C – Classic / F – Freestyle ; MSS – Mass Start / PUR – Pursuit
No.	WC	Date	Place	Discipline	Winner	Second	Third	R.
1		27 November 2026	(Finland) Ruka	10 km C				
2		28 November 2026	(Finland) Ruka	Sprint C				
3		29 November 2026	(Finland) Ruka	20 km F MSS				
4		4 December 2026	(Norway) Trondheim	10 km C				
5		5 December 2026	(Norway) Trondheim	Sprint F				
6		6 December 2026	(Norway) Trondheim	20 km skiathlon				
7		12 December 2026	(Switzerland) Davos	Sprint F				
8		13 December 2026	(Switzerland) Davos	5 km F Heat MSS				
TdS	9	1 January 2027	(France) Les Rousses	Sprint C				
TdS	10	2 January 2027	(France) Les Rousses	20 km C MSS				
TdS	11	3 January 2027	(France) Les Rousses	15 km F Pursuit				
TdS	12	5 January 2027	(Germany) Oberstdorf	15 km C MSS				
TdS	13	6 January 2027	(Germany) Oberstdorf	5 km F Heat MSS				
TdS	14	8 January 2027	(Italy) Val di Fiemme	15 km skiathlon				
TdS	15	9 January 2027	(Italy) Val di Fiemme	Sprint F				
TdS	16	10 January 2027	(Italy) Val di Fiemme	10 km F MSS Climb				
9	21st Tour de Ski Overall (1 January 2027 – 10 January 2027)							
10	17	23 January 2027	(Switzerland) Engadin	Sprint F				
11	18	24 January 2027	(Switzerland) Engadin	20 km F MSS				
12	19	29 January 2027	(Italy) Toblach	10 km F				
13	20	30 January 2027	(Italy) Toblach	Sprint F				
14	21	31 January 2027	(Italy) Toblach	20 km C MSS				
15	22	12 February 2027	(Finland) Lahti	Sprint C				
16	23	13 February 2027	(Finland) Lahti	20 km skiathlon				
17	24	14 February 2027	(Finland) Lahti	10 km C				
FIS Nordic World Ski Championships 2027 (22 February – 7 March • Falun, Sweden)
18	25	14 March 2027	(Norway) Oslo	50 km C MSS				
19	26	16 March 2027	(Norway) Drammen	Sprint C				
20	27	19 March 2027	(Sweden) Ulricehamn	10 km F				
21	28	20 March 2027	(Sweden) Ulricehamn	Sprint F				
22	29	21 March 2027	(Sweden) Ulricehamn	20 km C MSS				
46th FIS World Cup Overall (27 November 2026 – 21 March 2027)								

=== Overall leaders ===
Holder	Date	Place(s)	Number of competitions
	27 November 2026	(Finland) Ruka	

=== Standings ===
==== Overall ====
Rank	standings after 0 of 30 events	Points
2
3
4
5
6
7
8
9
10

==== Distance ====
Rank	standings after 0 of 19 events	Points
2
3
4
5
6
7
8
9
10

==== Sprint ====
Rank	standings after 0 of 10 events	Points
2
3
4
5
6
7
8
9
10

==== U23 ====
Rank	standings after 0 of 30 events	Points
2
3
4
5
6
7
8
9
10

==== Bonus ranking ====
Rank	standings after 0 of 14 events	Points
1
2
3
4
5
6
7
8
9
10

==== Prize money ====
Rank	standings after 0 of 36 payouts	CHF
1
2
3
4
5
6
7
8
9
10

== Team events ==
Event key: C – Classic / F – Freestyle
#	Date	Place	Discipline	Winner	Second	Third	Red bib (After competition)	R.
Men's Team
1	11 December 2026	(Switzerland) Davos	Sprint F					
Women's Team
1	11 December 2026	(Switzerland) Davos	Sprint F					
Mixed team
1	22 January 2027	(Switzerland) Engadin	4 × 5 km relay C/F					

== Nations Cup ==
=== Overall ===
Rank	standings after 0 of 63 events	Points
1
2
3
4
5
6
7
8
9
10

=== Men ===
Rank	standings after 0 of 32 events	Points
1
2
3
4
5
6
7
8
9
10

=== Women ===
Rank	standings after 0 of 32 events	Points
1
2
3
4
5
6
7
8
9
10

== Podium table by nation ==
Table showing the World Cup podium places (gold–1st place, silver–2nd place, bronze–3rd place) by the countries represented by the athletes.

Rank	Nation	Gold	Silver	Bronze	Total
Totals (0 entries)		0	0	0	0

== Point distribution ==
The table shows the number of points to win in every competition in the 2026–27 Cross-Country Skiing World Cup for men and women.

Place	1	2	3	4	5	6	7	8	9	10	11	12	13	14	15	16	17	18	19	20	21	22	23	24	25	26	27	28	29	30	31	32	33	34	35	36	37	38	39	40	41	42	43	44	45	46	47	48	49	50
Individual	100	95	90	85	80	75	72	69	66	63	60	58	56	54	52	50	48	46	44	42	40	38	36	34	32	30	28	26	24	22	20	19	18	17	16	15	14	13	12	11	10	9	8	7	6	5	4	3	2	1
Relay	200	160	120	100	90	80	72	64	58	52	48	44	40	36	32	30	28	26	24	22	20	18	16	14	12	10	8	6	4	2
Team sprint	200	160	120	100	90	80	72	64	58	52	48	44	40	36	32	30	28	26	24	22	20	18	16	14	12	10	8	6	4	2
Tour de Ski	300	285	270	255	240	225	216	207	198	189	180	174	168	162	156	150	144	138	132	126	120	114	108	102	96	90	84	78	72	66	60	57	54	51	48	45	42	39	36	33	30	27	24	21	18	15	12	9	6	3
Stage Tour de Ski	50	47	44	41	38	35	32	30	28	26	24	22	20	18	16	15	14	13	12	11	10	9	8	7	6	5	4	3	2	1
Bonus points (MSS checkpoints)	15	12	10	8	6	5	4	3	2	1
Sprint Q	15	12	10	8	6	5	4	3	2	1

== Achievements ==
Only individual events.

First World Cup career victory

Men

Women

First World Cup podium

Men

Women

Number of wins this season (in brackets are all-time wins)

Men

Women

== Retirements ==
The following notable skiers, who competed in the World Cup, retire during or after the 2026–27 season:

Men

Women

- (Germany) Katharina Hennig Dotzler
- (Norway) Ingvild Flugstad Østberg
