= 2027 BWF World Tour =

Tournament details
- Dates: 21 January – 12 December
- Edition: 10th

The 2027 BWF World Tour is the tenth season of the BWF World Tour of badminton, a circuit of 36 tournaments leading up to the World Tour Finals. The 36 tournaments are divided into five levels: Level 1, the World Tour Finals; Level 2, Super 1000 (5 tournaments); Level 3, Super 750 (5 tournaments); Level 4, Super 500 (9 tournaments); and Level 5, Super 300 (8 tournaments); and Level 6, Super 100 (8 tournaments). Each of these tournaments offers different ranking points and prize money. The highest points and prize pools are offered at the Super 1000 level (including the World Tour Finals).

For the first time, Super 100 tournaments have been fully integrated into the BWF World Tour tournament structure.

The new scoring format of 3x15 will be adopted and implemented starting from the current season. Under the new scoring system, matches remain a best-of-three format, with each match consisting of up to three games. Each game is played to 15 points. If the score reaches 14–14, play continues until one side establishes a two-point lead. However, a maximum limit of 21 points applies. If the score reaches 20–20, the side that wins the next point wins the game, regardless of the margin.

Several additional upgrades have also been introduced to enhance the overall tour experience. These include the incorporation of LED A-board technology to improve sponsor visibility and venue presentation, as well as upgraded lounges and player facilities to provide greater comfort for athletes.

== Schedule ==
Below is the schedule released by the Badminton World Federation:

== Key ==
World Tour Finals
Super 1000 (5)
Super 750 (5)
Super 500 (9)
Super 300 (8)
Super 100 (8)

== Winners ==
Tour	Report	Men's singles	Women's singles	Men's doubles	Women's doubles	Mixed doubles
World Tour Finals
BWF World Tour Finals	Report					
Super 1000
Malaysia Open						
All England Open						
Indonesia Open						
China Open						
Denmark Open						
Super 750
India Open						
Hong Kong Open						
Japan Open						
French Open						
China Masters						
Super 500
Indonesia Masters						
German Open						
Korea Open						
Singapore Open						
Thailand Open						
Malaysia Masters						
Arctic Open						
Japan Masters						
Australian Open						
Super 300
Thailand Masters						
Swiss Open						
Orléans Masters						
Taipei Open						
Canada Open						
U.S. Open						
Hylo Open						
Macau Open						
Super 100

== Finals ==
This is the complete schedule of events on the 2027 calendar, with the champions and runners-up documented.

=== January ===
Date	Tournament	Champions	Runners-up
21–31 January	Malaysia Open (Draw): Host: Kuala Lumpur, Malaysia; Venue: TBC; Level: Super 1000; Prize: $2,000,000; Format: 48MS/48WS/32MD/32WD/32XD		
21–31 January	Malaysia Open (Draw): Host: Kuala Lumpur, Malaysia; Venue: TBC; Level: Super 1000; Prize: $2,000,000; Format: 48MS/48WS/32MD/32WD/32XD	Score:	
21–31 January	Malaysia Open (Draw): Host: Kuala Lumpur, Malaysia; Venue: TBC; Level: Super 1000; Prize: $2,000,000; Format: 48MS/48WS/32MD/32WD/32XD	Score:	
21–31 January	Malaysia Open (Draw): Host: Kuala Lumpur, Malaysia; Venue: TBC; Level: Super 1000; Prize: $2,000,000; Format: 48MS/48WS/32MD/32WD/32XD	Score:	
21–31 January	Malaysia Open (Draw): Host: Kuala Lumpur, Malaysia; Venue: TBC; Level: Super 1000; Prize: $2,000,000; Format: 48MS/48WS/32MD/32WD/32XD	Score:	
21–31 January	Malaysia Open (Draw): Host: Kuala Lumpur, Malaysia; Venue: TBC; Level: Super 1000; Prize: $2,000,000; Format: 48MS/48WS/32MD/32WD/32XD	Score:	

=== February ===
Date	Tournament	Champions	Runners-up
2–7 February	India Open (Draw): Host: New Delhi, India; Venue: TBC; Level: Super 750; Prize: $1,100,000; Format: 32MS/32WS/32MD/32WD/32XD		
2–7 February	India Open (Draw): Host: New Delhi, India; Venue: TBC; Level: Super 750; Prize: $1,100,000; Format: 32MS/32WS/32MD/32WD/32XD	Score:	
2–7 February	India Open (Draw): Host: New Delhi, India; Venue: TBC; Level: Super 750; Prize: $1,100,000; Format: 32MS/32WS/32MD/32WD/32XD	Score:	
2–7 February	India Open (Draw): Host: New Delhi, India; Venue: TBC; Level: Super 750; Prize: $1,100,000; Format: 32MS/32WS/32MD/32WD/32XD	Score:	
2–7 February	India Open (Draw): Host: New Delhi, India; Venue: TBC; Level: Super 750; Prize: $1,100,000; Format: 32MS/32WS/32MD/32WD/32XD	Score:	
2–7 February	India Open (Draw): Host: New Delhi, India; Venue: TBC; Level: Super 750; Prize: $1,100,000; Format: 32MS/32WS/32MD/32WD/32XD	Score:	
9–14 February	Indonesia Masters (Draw): Host: Jakarta, Indonesia; Venue: TBC; Level: Super 500; Prize: $560,000; Format: 32MS/32WS/32MD/32WD/32XD		
9–14 February	Indonesia Masters (Draw): Host: Jakarta, Indonesia; Venue: TBC; Level: Super 500; Prize: $560,000; Format: 32MS/32WS/32MD/32WD/32XD	Score:	
9–14 February	Indonesia Masters (Draw): Host: Jakarta, Indonesia; Venue: TBC; Level: Super 500; Prize: $560,000; Format: 32MS/32WS/32MD/32WD/32XD	Score:	
9–14 February	Indonesia Masters (Draw): Host: Jakarta, Indonesia; Venue: TBC; Level: Super 500; Prize: $560,000; Format: 32MS/32WS/32MD/32WD/32XD	Score:	
9–14 February	Indonesia Masters (Draw): Host: Jakarta, Indonesia; Venue: TBC; Level: Super 500; Prize: $560,000; Format: 32MS/32WS/32MD/32WD/32XD	Score:	
9–14 February	Indonesia Masters (Draw): Host: Jakarta, Indonesia; Venue: TBC; Level: Super 500; Prize: $560,000; Format: 32MS/32WS/32MD/32WD/32XD	Score:	
16–21 February	Thailand Masters (Draw): Host: Bangkok, Thailand; Venue: TBC; Level: Super 300; Prize: $290,000; Format: 32MS/32WS/32MD/32WD/32XD		
16–21 February	Thailand Masters (Draw): Host: Bangkok, Thailand; Venue: TBC; Level: Super 300; Prize: $290,000; Format: 32MS/32WS/32MD/32WD/32XD	Score:	
16–21 February	Thailand Masters (Draw): Host: Bangkok, Thailand; Venue: TBC; Level: Super 300; Prize: $290,000; Format: 32MS/32WS/32MD/32WD/32XD	Score:	
16–21 February	Thailand Masters (Draw): Host: Bangkok, Thailand; Venue: TBC; Level: Super 300; Prize: $290,000; Format: 32MS/32WS/32MD/32WD/32XD	Score:	
16–21 February	Thailand Masters (Draw): Host: Bangkok, Thailand; Venue: TBC; Level: Super 300; Prize: $290,000; Format: 32MS/32WS/32MD/32WD/32XD	Score:	
16–21 February	Thailand Masters (Draw): Host: Bangkok, Thailand; Venue: TBC; Level: Super 300; Prize: $290,000; Format: 32MS/32WS/32MD/32WD/32XD	Score:	
23–28 February	German Open (Draw): Host: Mülheim, Germany; Venue: TBC; Level: Super 500; Prize: $560,000; Format: 32MS/32WS/32MD/32WD/32XD		
23–28 February	German Open (Draw): Host: Mülheim, Germany; Venue: TBC; Level: Super 500; Prize: $560,000; Format: 32MS/32WS/32MD/32WD/32XD	Score:	
23–28 February	German Open (Draw): Host: Mülheim, Germany; Venue: TBC; Level: Super 500; Prize: $560,000; Format: 32MS/32WS/32MD/32WD/32XD	Score:	
23–28 February	German Open (Draw): Host: Mülheim, Germany; Venue: TBC; Level: Super 500; Prize: $560,000; Format: 32MS/32WS/32MD/32WD/32XD	Score:	
23–28 February	German Open (Draw): Host: Mülheim, Germany; Venue: TBC; Level: Super 500; Prize: $560,000; Format: 32MS/32WS/32MD/32WD/32XD	Score:	
23–28 February	German Open (Draw): Host: Mülheim, Germany; Venue: TBC; Level: Super 500; Prize: $560,000; Format: 32MS/32WS/32MD/32WD/32XD	Score:	

=== March ===
Date	Tournament	Champions	Runners-up
4–14 March	All England Open (Draw): Host: Birmingham, England; Venue: TBC; Level: Super 1000; Prize: $2,000,000; Format: 48MS/48WS/32MD/32WD/32XD		
4–14 March	All England Open (Draw): Host: Birmingham, England; Venue: TBC; Level: Super 1000; Prize: $2,000,000; Format: 48MS/48WS/32MD/32WD/32XD	Score:	
4–14 March	All England Open (Draw): Host: Birmingham, England; Venue: TBC; Level: Super 1000; Prize: $2,000,000; Format: 48MS/48WS/32MD/32WD/32XD	Score:	
4–14 March	All England Open (Draw): Host: Birmingham, England; Venue: TBC; Level: Super 1000; Prize: $2,000,000; Format: 48MS/48WS/32MD/32WD/32XD	Score:	
4–14 March	All England Open (Draw): Host: Birmingham, England; Venue: TBC; Level: Super 1000; Prize: $2,000,000; Format: 48MS/48WS/32MD/32WD/32XD	Score:	
4–14 March	All England Open (Draw): Host: Birmingham, England; Venue: TBC; Level: Super 1000; Prize: $2,000,000; Format: 48MS/48WS/32MD/32WD/32XD	Score:	
16–21 March	Swiss Open (Draw): Host: Basel, Switzerland; Venue: TBC; Level: Super 300; Prize: $290,000; Format: 32MS/32WS/32MD/32WD/32XD		
16–21 March	Swiss Open (Draw): Host: Basel, Switzerland; Venue: TBC; Level: Super 300; Prize: $290,000; Format: 32MS/32WS/32MD/32WD/32XD	Score:	
16–21 March	Swiss Open (Draw): Host: Basel, Switzerland; Venue: TBC; Level: Super 300; Prize: $290,000; Format: 32MS/32WS/32MD/32WD/32XD	Score:	
16–21 March	Swiss Open (Draw): Host: Basel, Switzerland; Venue: TBC; Level: Super 300; Prize: $290,000; Format: 32MS/32WS/32MD/32WD/32XD	Score:	
16–21 March	Swiss Open (Draw): Host: Basel, Switzerland; Venue: TBC; Level: Super 300; Prize: $290,000; Format: 32MS/32WS/32MD/32WD/32XD	Score:	
16–21 March	Swiss Open (Draw): Host: Basel, Switzerland; Venue: TBC; Level: Super 300; Prize: $290,000; Format: 32MS/32WS/32MD/32WD/32XD	Score:	
23–28 March	Orléans Masters (Draw): Host: Orléans, France; Venue: TBC; Level: Super 300; Prize: $290,000; Format: 32MS/32WS/32MD/32WD/32XD		
23–28 March	Orléans Masters (Draw): Host: Orléans, France; Venue: TBC; Level: Super 300; Prize: $290,000; Format: 32MS/32WS/32MD/32WD/32XD	Score:	
23–28 March	Orléans Masters (Draw): Host: Orléans, France; Venue: TBC; Level: Super 300; Prize: $290,000; Format: 32MS/32WS/32MD/32WD/32XD	Score:	
23–28 March	Orléans Masters (Draw): Host: Orléans, France; Venue: TBC; Level: Super 300; Prize: $290,000; Format: 32MS/32WS/32MD/32WD/32XD	Score:	
23–28 March	Orléans Masters (Draw): Host: Orléans, France; Venue: TBC; Level: Super 300; Prize: $290,000; Format: 32MS/32WS/32MD/32WD/32XD	Score:	
23–28 March	Orléans Masters (Draw): Host: Orléans, France; Venue: TBC; Level: Super 300; Prize: $290,000; Format: 32MS/32WS/32MD/32WD/32XD	Score:	

=== April ===
Date	Tournament	Champions	Runners-up
13–18 April	Philippine Open (Draw): Host: Manila, Philippines; Venue: TBC; Level: Super 100; Prize: $140,000; Format: 48MS/32WS/32MD/32WD/32XD		
13–18 April	Philippine Open (Draw): Host: Manila, Philippines; Venue: TBC; Level: Super 100; Prize: $140,000; Format: 48MS/32WS/32MD/32WD/32XD	Score:	
13–18 April	Philippine Open (Draw): Host: Manila, Philippines; Venue: TBC; Level: Super 100; Prize: $140,000; Format: 48MS/32WS/32MD/32WD/32XD	Score:	
13–18 April	Philippine Open (Draw): Host: Manila, Philippines; Venue: TBC; Level: Super 100; Prize: $140,000; Format: 48MS/32WS/32MD/32WD/32XD	Score:	
13–18 April	Philippine Open (Draw): Host: Manila, Philippines; Venue: TBC; Level: Super 100; Prize: $140,000; Format: 48MS/32WS/32MD/32WD/32XD	Score:	
13–18 April	Philippine Open (Draw): Host: Manila, Philippines; Venue: TBC; Level: Super 100; Prize: $140,000; Format: 48MS/32WS/32MD/32WD/32XD	Score:	

=== May ===
Date	Tournament	Champions	Runners-up
4–9 May	Taipei Open (Draw): Host: Taipei, Taiwan; Venue: TBC; Level: Super 300; Prize: $290,000; Format: 32MS/32WS/32MD/32WD/32XD		
4–9 May	Taipei Open (Draw): Host: Taipei, Taiwan; Venue: TBC; Level: Super 300; Prize: $290,000; Format: 32MS/32WS/32MD/32WD/32XD	Score:	
4–9 May	Taipei Open (Draw): Host: Taipei, Taiwan; Venue: TBC; Level: Super 300; Prize: $290,000; Format: 32MS/32WS/32MD/32WD/32XD	Score:	
4–9 May	Taipei Open (Draw): Host: Taipei, Taiwan; Venue: TBC; Level: Super 300; Prize: $290,000; Format: 32MS/32WS/32MD/32WD/32XD	Score:	
4–9 May	Taipei Open (Draw): Host: Taipei, Taiwan; Venue: TBC; Level: Super 300; Prize: $290,000; Format: 32MS/32WS/32MD/32WD/32XD	Score:	
4–9 May	Taipei Open (Draw): Host: Taipei, Taiwan; Venue: TBC; Level: Super 300; Prize: $290,000; Format: 32MS/32WS/32MD/32WD/32XD	Score:	
11–16 May	Korea Open (Draw): Host: TBC, South Korea; Venue: TBC; Level: Super 500; Prize: $560,000; Format: 32MS/32WS/32MD/32WD/32XD		
11–16 May	Korea Open (Draw): Host: TBC, South Korea; Venue: TBC; Level: Super 500; Prize: $560,000; Format: 32MS/32WS/32MD/32WD/32XD	Score:	
11–16 May	Korea Open (Draw): Host: TBC, South Korea; Venue: TBC; Level: Super 500; Prize: $560,000; Format: 32MS/32WS/32MD/32WD/32XD	Score:	
11–16 May	Korea Open (Draw): Host: TBC, South Korea; Venue: TBC; Level: Super 500; Prize: $560,000; Format: 32MS/32WS/32MD/32WD/32XD	Score:	
11–16 May	Korea Open (Draw): Host: TBC, South Korea; Venue: TBC; Level: Super 500; Prize: $560,000; Format: 32MS/32WS/32MD/32WD/32XD	Score:	
11–16 May	Korea Open (Draw): Host: TBC, South Korea; Venue: TBC; Level: Super 500; Prize: $560,000; Format: 32MS/32WS/32MD/32WD/32XD	Score:	
18–23 May	Hong Kong Open (Draw): Host: Hong Kong; Venue: TBC; Level: Super 750; Prize: $1,100,000; Format: 32MS/32WS/32MD/32WD/32XD		
18–23 May	Hong Kong Open (Draw): Host: Hong Kong; Venue: TBC; Level: Super 750; Prize: $1,100,000; Format: 32MS/32WS/32MD/32WD/32XD	Score:	
18–23 May	Hong Kong Open (Draw): Host: Hong Kong; Venue: TBC; Level: Super 750; Prize: $1,100,000; Format: 32MS/32WS/32MD/32WD/32XD	Score:	
18–23 May	Hong Kong Open (Draw): Host: Hong Kong; Venue: TBC; Level: Super 750; Prize: $1,100,000; Format: 32MS/32WS/32MD/32WD/32XD	Score:	
18–23 May	Hong Kong Open (Draw): Host: Hong Kong; Venue: TBC; Level: Super 750; Prize: $1,100,000; Format: 32MS/32WS/32MD/32WD/32XD	Score:	
18–23 May	Hong Kong Open (Draw): Host: Hong Kong; Venue: TBC; Level: Super 750; Prize: $1,100,000; Format: 32MS/32WS/32MD/32WD/32XD	Score:	
27 May – 6 June	Indonesia Open (Draw): Host: Jakarta, Indonesia; Venue: TBC; Level: Super 1000; Prize: $2,000,000; Format: 48MS/48WS/32MD/32WD/32XD		
27 May – 6 June	Indonesia Open (Draw): Host: Jakarta, Indonesia; Venue: TBC; Level: Super 1000; Prize: $2,000,000; Format: 48MS/48WS/32MD/32WD/32XD	Score:	
27 May – 6 June	Indonesia Open (Draw): Host: Jakarta, Indonesia; Venue: TBC; Level: Super 1000; Prize: $2,000,000; Format: 48MS/48WS/32MD/32WD/32XD	Score:	
27 May – 6 June	Indonesia Open (Draw): Host: Jakarta, Indonesia; Venue: TBC; Level: Super 1000; Prize: $2,000,000; Format: 48MS/48WS/32MD/32WD/32XD	Score:	
27 May – 6 June	Indonesia Open (Draw): Host: Jakarta, Indonesia; Venue: TBC; Level: Super 1000; Prize: $2,000,000; Format: 48MS/48WS/32MD/32WD/32XD	Score:	
27 May – 6 June	Indonesia Open (Draw): Host: Jakarta, Indonesia; Venue: TBC; Level: Super 1000; Prize: $2,000,000; Format: 48MS/48WS/32MD/32WD/32XD	Score:	

=== June ===
Date	Tournament	Champions	Runners-up
8–13 June	Singapore Open (Draw): Host: Singapore; Venue: TBC; Level: Super 500; Prize: $560,000; Format: 32MS/32WS/32MD/32WD/32XD		
8–13 June	Singapore Open (Draw): Host: Singapore; Venue: TBC; Level: Super 500; Prize: $560,000; Format: 32MS/32WS/32MD/32WD/32XD	Score:	
8–13 June	Singapore Open (Draw): Host: Singapore; Venue: TBC; Level: Super 500; Prize: $560,000; Format: 32MS/32WS/32MD/32WD/32XD	Score:	
8–13 June	Singapore Open (Draw): Host: Singapore; Venue: TBC; Level: Super 500; Prize: $560,000; Format: 32MS/32WS/32MD/32WD/32XD	Score:	
8–13 June	Singapore Open (Draw): Host: Singapore; Venue: TBC; Level: Super 500; Prize: $560,000; Format: 32MS/32WS/32MD/32WD/32XD	Score:	
8–13 June	Singapore Open (Draw): Host: Singapore; Venue: TBC; Level: Super 500; Prize: $560,000; Format: 32MS/32WS/32MD/32WD/32XD	Score:	
15–20 June	Vietnam Open (Draw): Host: Ho Chi Minh City, Vietnam; Venue: TBC; Level: Super 100; Prize: $140,000; Format: 48MS/32WS/32MD/32WD/32XD		
15–20 June	Vietnam Open (Draw): Host: Ho Chi Minh City, Vietnam; Venue: TBC; Level: Super 100; Prize: $140,000; Format: 48MS/32WS/32MD/32WD/32XD	Score:	
15–20 June	Vietnam Open (Draw): Host: Ho Chi Minh City, Vietnam; Venue: TBC; Level: Super 100; Prize: $140,000; Format: 48MS/32WS/32MD/32WD/32XD	Score:	
15–20 June	Vietnam Open (Draw): Host: Ho Chi Minh City, Vietnam; Venue: TBC; Level: Super 100; Prize: $140,000; Format: 48MS/32WS/32MD/32WD/32XD	Score:	
15–20 June	Vietnam Open (Draw): Host: Ho Chi Minh City, Vietnam; Venue: TBC; Level: Super 100; Prize: $140,000; Format: 48MS/32WS/32MD/32WD/32XD	Score:	
15–20 June	Vietnam Open (Draw): Host: Ho Chi Minh City, Vietnam; Venue: TBC; Level: Super 100; Prize: $140,000; Format: 48MS/32WS/32MD/32WD/32XD	Score:	
22–27 June	China Super 100 (Draw): Host: TBC, China; Venue: TBC; Level: Super 100; Prize: $140,000; Format: 48MS/32WS/32MD/32WD/32XD		
22–27 June	China Super 100 (Draw): Host: TBC, China; Venue: TBC; Level: Super 100; Prize: $140,000; Format: 48MS/32WS/32MD/32WD/32XD	Score:	
22–27 June	China Super 100 (Draw): Host: TBC, China; Venue: TBC; Level: Super 100; Prize: $140,000; Format: 48MS/32WS/32MD/32WD/32XD	Score:	
22–27 June	China Super 100 (Draw): Host: TBC, China; Venue: TBC; Level: Super 100; Prize: $140,000; Format: 48MS/32WS/32MD/32WD/32XD	Score:	
22–27 June	China Super 100 (Draw): Host: TBC, China; Venue: TBC; Level: Super 100; Prize: $140,000; Format: 48MS/32WS/32MD/32WD/32XD	Score:	
22–27 June	China Super 100 (Draw): Host: TBC, China; Venue: TBC; Level: Super 100; Prize: $140,000; Format: 48MS/32WS/32MD/32WD/32XD	Score:	
29 June – 4 July	Canada Open (Draw): Host: TBC, Canada; Venue: TBC; Level: Super 300; Prize: $290,000; Format: 32MS/32WS/32MD/32WD/32XD		
29 June – 4 July	Canada Open (Draw): Host: TBC, Canada; Venue: TBC; Level: Super 300; Prize: $290,000; Format: 32MS/32WS/32MD/32WD/32XD	Score:	
29 June – 4 July	Canada Open (Draw): Host: TBC, Canada; Venue: TBC; Level: Super 300; Prize: $290,000; Format: 32MS/32WS/32MD/32WD/32XD	Score:	
29 June – 4 July	Canada Open (Draw): Host: TBC, Canada; Venue: TBC; Level: Super 300; Prize: $290,000; Format: 32MS/32WS/32MD/32WD/32XD	Score:	
29 June – 4 July	Canada Open (Draw): Host: TBC, Canada; Venue: TBC; Level: Super 300; Prize: $290,000; Format: 32MS/32WS/32MD/32WD/32XD	Score:	
29 June – 4 July	Canada Open (Draw): Host: TBC, Canada; Venue: TBC; Level: Super 300; Prize: $290,000; Format: 32MS/32WS/32MD/32WD/32XD	Score:	

=== July ===
Date	Tournament	Champions	Runners-up
6–11 July	U.S. Open (Draw): Host: Los Angeles, United States; Venue: TBC; Level: Super 300; Prize: $290,000; Format: 32MS/32WS/32MD/32WD/32XD		
6–11 July	U.S. Open (Draw): Host: Los Angeles, United States; Venue: TBC; Level: Super 300; Prize: $290,000; Format: 32MS/32WS/32MD/32WD/32XD	Score:	
6–11 July	U.S. Open (Draw): Host: Los Angeles, United States; Venue: TBC; Level: Super 300; Prize: $290,000; Format: 32MS/32WS/32MD/32WD/32XD	Score:	
6–11 July	U.S. Open (Draw): Host: Los Angeles, United States; Venue: TBC; Level: Super 300; Prize: $290,000; Format: 32MS/32WS/32MD/32WD/32XD	Score:	
6–11 July	U.S. Open (Draw): Host: Los Angeles, United States; Venue: TBC; Level: Super 300; Prize: $290,000; Format: 32MS/32WS/32MD/32WD/32XD	Score:	
6–11 July	U.S. Open (Draw): Host: Los Angeles, United States; Venue: TBC; Level: Super 300; Prize: $290,000; Format: 32MS/32WS/32MD/32WD/32XD	Score:	
27 July – 1 August	Syed Modi International (Draw): Host: Lucknow, India; Venue: TBC; Level: Super 100; Prize: $140,000; Format: 48MS/32WS/32MD/32WD/32XD		
27 July – 1 August	Syed Modi International (Draw): Host: Lucknow, India; Venue: TBC; Level: Super 100; Prize: $140,000; Format: 48MS/32WS/32MD/32WD/32XD	Score:	
27 July – 1 August	Syed Modi International (Draw): Host: Lucknow, India; Venue: TBC; Level: Super 100; Prize: $140,000; Format: 48MS/32WS/32MD/32WD/32XD	Score:	
27 July – 1 August	Syed Modi International (Draw): Host: Lucknow, India; Venue: TBC; Level: Super 100; Prize: $140,000; Format: 48MS/32WS/32MD/32WD/32XD	Score:	
27 July – 1 August	Syed Modi International (Draw): Host: Lucknow, India; Venue: TBC; Level: Super 100; Prize: $140,000; Format: 48MS/32WS/32MD/32WD/32XD	Score:	
27 July – 1 August	Syed Modi International (Draw): Host: Lucknow, India; Venue: TBC; Level: Super 100; Prize: $140,000; Format: 48MS/32WS/32MD/32WD/32XD	Score:	

=== August ===
Date	Tournament	Champions	Runners-up
10–15 August	Thailand Open (Draw): Host: Bangkok, Thailand; Venue: TBC; Level: Super 500; Prize: $560,000; Format: 32MS/32WS/32MD/32WD/32XD		
10–15 August	Thailand Open (Draw): Host: Bangkok, Thailand; Venue: TBC; Level: Super 500; Prize: $560,000; Format: 32MS/32WS/32MD/32WD/32XD	Score:	
10–15 August	Thailand Open (Draw): Host: Bangkok, Thailand; Venue: TBC; Level: Super 500; Prize: $560,000; Format: 32MS/32WS/32MD/32WD/32XD	Score:	
10–15 August	Thailand Open (Draw): Host: Bangkok, Thailand; Venue: TBC; Level: Super 500; Prize: $560,000; Format: 32MS/32WS/32MD/32WD/32XD	Score:	
10–15 August	Thailand Open (Draw): Host: Bangkok, Thailand; Venue: TBC; Level: Super 500; Prize: $560,000; Format: 32MS/32WS/32MD/32WD/32XD	Score:	
10–15 August	Thailand Open (Draw): Host: Bangkok, Thailand; Venue: TBC; Level: Super 500; Prize: $560,000; Format: 32MS/32WS/32MD/32WD/32XD	Score:	
17–22 August	Malaysia Masters (Draw): Host: Kuala Lumpur, Malaysia; Venue: TBC; Level: Super 500; Prize: $560,000; Format: 32MS/32WS/32MD/32WD/32XD		
17–22 August	Malaysia Masters (Draw): Host: Kuala Lumpur, Malaysia; Venue: TBC; Level: Super 500; Prize: $560,000; Format: 32MS/32WS/32MD/32WD/32XD	Score:	
17–22 August	Malaysia Masters (Draw): Host: Kuala Lumpur, Malaysia; Venue: TBC; Level: Super 500; Prize: $560,000; Format: 32MS/32WS/32MD/32WD/32XD	Score:	
17–22 August	Malaysia Masters (Draw): Host: Kuala Lumpur, Malaysia; Venue: TBC; Level: Super 500; Prize: $560,000; Format: 32MS/32WS/32MD/32WD/32XD	Score:	
17–22 August	Malaysia Masters (Draw): Host: Kuala Lumpur, Malaysia; Venue: TBC; Level: Super 500; Prize: $560,000; Format: 32MS/32WS/32MD/32WD/32XD	Score:	
17–22 August	Malaysia Masters (Draw): Host: Kuala Lumpur, Malaysia; Venue: TBC; Level: Super 500; Prize: $560,000; Format: 32MS/32WS/32MD/32WD/32XD	Score:	
24–29 August	Japan Open (Draw): Host: Tokyo, Japan; Venue: TBC; Level: Super 750; Prize: $1,100,000; Format: 32MS/32WS/32MD/32WD/32XD		
24–29 August	Japan Open (Draw): Host: Tokyo, Japan; Venue: TBC; Level: Super 750; Prize: $1,100,000; Format: 32MS/32WS/32MD/32WD/32XD	Score:	
24–29 August	Japan Open (Draw): Host: Tokyo, Japan; Venue: TBC; Level: Super 750; Prize: $1,100,000; Format: 32MS/32WS/32MD/32WD/32XD	Score:	
24–29 August	Japan Open (Draw): Host: Tokyo, Japan; Venue: TBC; Level: Super 750; Prize: $1,100,000; Format: 32MS/32WS/32MD/32WD/32XD	Score:	
24–29 August	Japan Open (Draw): Host: Tokyo, Japan; Venue: TBC; Level: Super 750; Prize: $1,100,000; Format: 32MS/32WS/32MD/32WD/32XD	Score:	
24–29 August	Japan Open (Draw): Host: Tokyo, Japan; Venue: TBC; Level: Super 750; Prize: $1,100,000; Format: 32MS/32WS/32MD/32WD/32XD	Score:	

=== September ===
Date	Tournament	Champions	Runners-up
2–12 September	China Open (Draw): Host: Chengdu, China; Venue: TBC; Level: Super 1000; Prize: $2,000,000; Format: 48MS/48WS/32MD/32WD/32XD		
2–12 September	China Open (Draw): Host: Chengdu, China; Venue: TBC; Level: Super 1000; Prize: $2,000,000; Format: 48MS/48WS/32MD/32WD/32XD	Score:	
2–12 September	China Open (Draw): Host: Chengdu, China; Venue: TBC; Level: Super 1000; Prize: $2,000,000; Format: 48MS/48WS/32MD/32WD/32XD	Score:	
2–12 September	China Open (Draw): Host: Chengdu, China; Venue: TBC; Level: Super 1000; Prize: $2,000,000; Format: 48MS/48WS/32MD/32WD/32XD	Score:	
2–12 September	China Open (Draw): Host: Chengdu, China; Venue: TBC; Level: Super 1000; Prize: $2,000,000; Format: 48MS/48WS/32MD/32WD/32XD	Score:	
2–12 September	China Open (Draw): Host: Chengdu, China; Venue: TBC; Level: Super 1000; Prize: $2,000,000; Format: 48MS/48WS/32MD/32WD/32XD	Score:	
14–19 September	Kaohsiung Masters (Draw): Host: Kaohsiung, Taiwan; Venue: TBC; Level: Super 100; Prize: $140,000; Format: 48MS/32WS/32MD/32WD/32XD		
14–19 September	Kaohsiung Masters (Draw): Host: Kaohsiung, Taiwan; Venue: TBC; Level: Super 100; Prize: $140,000; Format: 48MS/32WS/32MD/32WD/32XD	Score:	
14–19 September	Kaohsiung Masters (Draw): Host: Kaohsiung, Taiwan; Venue: TBC; Level: Super 100; Prize: $140,000; Format: 48MS/32WS/32MD/32WD/32XD	Score:	
14–19 September	Kaohsiung Masters (Draw): Host: Kaohsiung, Taiwan; Venue: TBC; Level: Super 100; Prize: $140,000; Format: 48MS/32WS/32MD/32WD/32XD	Score:	
14–19 September	Kaohsiung Masters (Draw): Host: Kaohsiung, Taiwan; Venue: TBC; Level: Super 100; Prize: $140,000; Format: 48MS/32WS/32MD/32WD/32XD	Score:	
14–19 September	Kaohsiung Masters (Draw): Host: Kaohsiung, Taiwan; Venue: TBC; Level: Super 100; Prize: $140,000; Format: 48MS/32WS/32MD/32WD/32XD	Score:	
21–26 September	Indonesia Super 100 II (Draw): Host: TBC, Indonesia; Venue: TBC; Level: Super 100; Prize: $140,000; Format: 48MS/32WS/32MD/32WD/32XD		
21–26 September	Indonesia Super 100 II (Draw): Host: TBC, Indonesia; Venue: TBC; Level: Super 100; Prize: $140,000; Format: 48MS/32WS/32MD/32WD/32XD	Score:	
21–26 September	Indonesia Super 100 II (Draw): Host: TBC, Indonesia; Venue: TBC; Level: Super 100; Prize: $140,000; Format: 48MS/32WS/32MD/32WD/32XD	Score:	
21–26 September	Indonesia Super 100 II (Draw): Host: TBC, Indonesia; Venue: TBC; Level: Super 100; Prize: $140,000; Format: 48MS/32WS/32MD/32WD/32XD	Score:	
21–26 September	Indonesia Super 100 II (Draw): Host: TBC, Indonesia; Venue: TBC; Level: Super 100; Prize: $140,000; Format: 48MS/32WS/32MD/32WD/32XD	Score:	
21–26 September	Indonesia Super 100 II (Draw): Host: TBC, Indonesia; Venue: TBC; Level: Super 100; Prize: $140,000; Format: 48MS/32WS/32MD/32WD/32XD	Score:	
28 September – 3 October	Arctic Open (Draw): Host: Vantaa, Finland; Venue: TBC; Level: Super 500; Prize: $560,000; Format: 32MS/32WS/32MD/32WD/32XD		
28 September – 3 October	Arctic Open (Draw): Host: Vantaa, Finland; Venue: TBC; Level: Super 500; Prize: $560,000; Format: 32MS/32WS/32MD/32WD/32XD	Score:	
28 September – 3 October	Arctic Open (Draw): Host: Vantaa, Finland; Venue: TBC; Level: Super 500; Prize: $560,000; Format: 32MS/32WS/32MD/32WD/32XD	Score:	
28 September – 3 October	Arctic Open (Draw): Host: Vantaa, Finland; Venue: TBC; Level: Super 500; Prize: $560,000; Format: 32MS/32WS/32MD/32WD/32XD	Score:	
28 September – 3 October	Arctic Open (Draw): Host: Vantaa, Finland; Venue: TBC; Level: Super 500; Prize: $560,000; Format: 32MS/32WS/32MD/32WD/32XD	Score:	
28 September – 3 October	Arctic Open (Draw): Host: Vantaa, Finland; Venue: TBC; Level: Super 500; Prize: $560,000; Format: 32MS/32WS/32MD/32WD/32XD	Score:	

=== October ===
Date	Tournament	Champions	Runners-up
5–10 October	French Open (Draw): Host: Paris, France; Venue: TBC; Level: Super 750; Prize: $1,100,000; Format: 32MS/32WS/32MD/32WD/32XD		
5–10 October	French Open (Draw): Host: Paris, France; Venue: TBC; Level: Super 750; Prize: $1,100,000; Format: 32MS/32WS/32MD/32WD/32XD	Score:	
5–10 October	French Open (Draw): Host: Paris, France; Venue: TBC; Level: Super 750; Prize: $1,100,000; Format: 32MS/32WS/32MD/32WD/32XD	Score:	
5–10 October	French Open (Draw): Host: Paris, France; Venue: TBC; Level: Super 750; Prize: $1,100,000; Format: 32MS/32WS/32MD/32WD/32XD	Score:	
5–10 October	French Open (Draw): Host: Paris, France; Venue: TBC; Level: Super 750; Prize: $1,100,000; Format: 32MS/32WS/32MD/32WD/32XD	Score:	
5–10 October	French Open (Draw): Host: Paris, France; Venue: TBC; Level: Super 750; Prize: $1,100,000; Format: 32MS/32WS/32MD/32WD/32XD	Score:	
14–24 October	Denmark Open (Draw): Host: Odense, Denmark; Venue: TBC; Level: Super 1000; Prize: $2,000,000; Format: 48MS/48WS/32MD/32WD/32XD		
14–24 October	Denmark Open (Draw): Host: Odense, Denmark; Venue: TBC; Level: Super 1000; Prize: $2,000,000; Format: 48MS/48WS/32MD/32WD/32XD	Score:	
14–24 October	Denmark Open (Draw): Host: Odense, Denmark; Venue: TBC; Level: Super 1000; Prize: $2,000,000; Format: 48MS/48WS/32MD/32WD/32XD	Score:	
14–24 October	Denmark Open (Draw): Host: Odense, Denmark; Venue: TBC; Level: Super 1000; Prize: $2,000,000; Format: 48MS/48WS/32MD/32WD/32XD	Score:	
14–24 October	Denmark Open (Draw): Host: Odense, Denmark; Venue: TBC; Level: Super 1000; Prize: $2,000,000; Format: 48MS/48WS/32MD/32WD/32XD	Score:	
14–24 October	Denmark Open (Draw): Host: Odense, Denmark; Venue: TBC; Level: Super 1000; Prize: $2,000,000; Format: 48MS/48WS/32MD/32WD/32XD	Score:	
19–24 October	Malaysia Super 100 (Draw): Host: TBC, Malaysia; Venue: TBC; Level: Super 100; Prize: $140,000; Format: 48MS/32WS/32MD/32WD/32XD		
19–24 October	Malaysia Super 100 (Draw): Host: TBC, Malaysia; Venue: TBC; Level: Super 100; Prize: $140,000; Format: 48MS/32WS/32MD/32WD/32XD	Score:	
19–24 October	Malaysia Super 100 (Draw): Host: TBC, Malaysia; Venue: TBC; Level: Super 100; Prize: $140,000; Format: 48MS/32WS/32MD/32WD/32XD	Score:	
19–24 October	Malaysia Super 100 (Draw): Host: TBC, Malaysia; Venue: TBC; Level: Super 100; Prize: $140,000; Format: 48MS/32WS/32MD/32WD/32XD	Score:	
19–24 October	Malaysia Super 100 (Draw): Host: TBC, Malaysia; Venue: TBC; Level: Super 100; Prize: $140,000; Format: 48MS/32WS/32MD/32WD/32XD	Score:	
19–24 October	Malaysia Super 100 (Draw): Host: TBC, Malaysia; Venue: TBC; Level: Super 100; Prize: $140,000; Format: 48MS/32WS/32MD/32WD/32XD	Score:	
26–31 October	Hylo Open (Draw): Host: Saarbrücken, Germany; Venue: TBC; Level: Super 300; Prize: $290,000; Format: 32MS/32WS/32MD/32WD/32XD		
26–31 October	Hylo Open (Draw): Host: Saarbrücken, Germany; Venue: TBC; Level: Super 300; Prize: $290,000; Format: 32MS/32WS/32MD/32WD/32XD	Score:	
26–31 October	Hylo Open (Draw): Host: Saarbrücken, Germany; Venue: TBC; Level: Super 300; Prize: $290,000; Format: 32MS/32WS/32MD/32WD/32XD	Score:	
26–31 October	Hylo Open (Draw): Host: Saarbrücken, Germany; Venue: TBC; Level: Super 300; Prize: $290,000; Format: 32MS/32WS/32MD/32WD/32XD	Score:	
26–31 October	Hylo Open (Draw): Host: Saarbrücken, Germany; Venue: TBC; Level: Super 300; Prize: $290,000; Format: 32MS/32WS/32MD/32WD/32XD	Score:	
26–31 October	Hylo Open (Draw): Host: Saarbrücken, Germany; Venue: TBC; Level: Super 300; Prize: $290,000; Format: 32MS/32WS/32MD/32WD/32XD	Score:	

=== November ===
Date	Tournament	Champions	Runners-up
2–7 November	China Masters (Draw): Host: Shenzhen, China; Venue: TBC; Level: Super 750; Prize: $1,100,000; Format: 32MS/32WS/32MD/32WD/32XD		
2–7 November	China Masters (Draw): Host: Shenzhen, China; Venue: TBC; Level: Super 750; Prize: $1,100,000; Format: 32MS/32WS/32MD/32WD/32XD	Score:	
2–7 November	China Masters (Draw): Host: Shenzhen, China; Venue: TBC; Level: Super 750; Prize: $1,100,000; Format: 32MS/32WS/32MD/32WD/32XD	Score:	
2–7 November	China Masters (Draw): Host: Shenzhen, China; Venue: TBC; Level: Super 750; Prize: $1,100,000; Format: 32MS/32WS/32MD/32WD/32XD	Score:	
2–7 November	China Masters (Draw): Host: Shenzhen, China; Venue: TBC; Level: Super 750; Prize: $1,100,000; Format: 32MS/32WS/32MD/32WD/32XD	Score:	
2–7 November	China Masters (Draw): Host: Shenzhen, China; Venue: TBC; Level: Super 750; Prize: $1,100,000; Format: 32MS/32WS/32MD/32WD/32XD	Score:	
9–14 November	Japan Masters (Draw): Host: Kumamoto, Japan; Venue: TBC; Level: Super 500; Prize: $560,000; Format: 32MS/32WS/32MD/32WD/32XD		
9–14 November	Japan Masters (Draw): Host: Kumamoto, Japan; Venue: TBC; Level: Super 500; Prize: $560,000; Format: 32MS/32WS/32MD/32WD/32XD	Score:	
9–14 November	Japan Masters (Draw): Host: Kumamoto, Japan; Venue: TBC; Level: Super 500; Prize: $560,000; Format: 32MS/32WS/32MD/32WD/32XD	Score:	
9–14 November	Japan Masters (Draw): Host: Kumamoto, Japan; Venue: TBC; Level: Super 500; Prize: $560,000; Format: 32MS/32WS/32MD/32WD/32XD	Score:	
9–14 November	Japan Masters (Draw): Host: Kumamoto, Japan; Venue: TBC; Level: Super 500; Prize: $560,000; Format: 32MS/32WS/32MD/32WD/32XD	Score:	
9–14 November	Japan Masters (Draw): Host: Kumamoto, Japan; Venue: TBC; Level: Super 500; Prize: $560,000; Format: 32MS/32WS/32MD/32WD/32XD	Score:	
16–21 November	Australian Open (Draw): Host: Sydney, Australia; Venue: TBC; Level: Super 500; Prize: $560,000; Format: 32MS/32WS/32MD/32WD/32XD		
16–21 November	Australian Open (Draw): Host: Sydney, Australia; Venue: TBC; Level: Super 500; Prize: $560,000; Format: 32MS/32WS/32MD/32WD/32XD	Score:	
16–21 November	Australian Open (Draw): Host: Sydney, Australia; Venue: TBC; Level: Super 500; Prize: $560,000; Format: 32MS/32WS/32MD/32WD/32XD	Score:	
16–21 November	Australian Open (Draw): Host: Sydney, Australia; Venue: TBC; Level: Super 500; Prize: $560,000; Format: 32MS/32WS/32MD/32WD/32XD	Score:	
16–21 November	Australian Open (Draw): Host: Sydney, Australia; Venue: TBC; Level: Super 500; Prize: $560,000; Format: 32MS/32WS/32MD/32WD/32XD	Score:	
16–21 November	Australian Open (Draw): Host: Sydney, Australia; Venue: TBC; Level: Super 500; Prize: $560,000; Format: 32MS/32WS/32MD/32WD/32XD	Score:	
23–28 November	Macau Open (Draw): Host: Macau; Venue: TBC; Level: Super 300; Prize: $290,000; Format: 32MS/32WS/32MD/32WD/32XD		
23–28 November	Macau Open (Draw): Host: Macau; Venue: TBC; Level: Super 300; Prize: $290,000; Format: 32MS/32WS/32MD/32WD/32XD	Score:	
23–28 November	Macau Open (Draw): Host: Macau; Venue: TBC; Level: Super 300; Prize: $290,000; Format: 32MS/32WS/32MD/32WD/32XD	Score:	
23–28 November	Macau Open (Draw): Host: Macau; Venue: TBC; Level: Super 300; Prize: $290,000; Format: 32MS/32WS/32MD/32WD/32XD	Score:	
23–28 November	Macau Open (Draw): Host: Macau; Venue: TBC; Level: Super 300; Prize: $290,000; Format: 32MS/32WS/32MD/32WD/32XD	Score:	
23–28 November	Macau Open (Draw): Host: Macau; Venue: TBC; Level: Super 300; Prize: $290,000; Format: 32MS/32WS/32MD/32WD/32XD	Score:	
30 November – 5 December	Indonesia Super 100 I (Draw): Host: TBC, Indonesia; Venue: TBC; Level: Super 100; Prize: $140,000; Format: 48MS/32WS/32MD/32WD/32XD		
30 November – 5 December	Indonesia Super 100 I (Draw): Host: TBC, Indonesia; Venue: TBC; Level: Super 100; Prize: $140,000; Format: 48MS/32WS/32MD/32WD/32XD	Score:	
30 November – 5 December	Indonesia Super 100 I (Draw): Host: TBC, Indonesia; Venue: TBC; Level: Super 100; Prize: $140,000; Format: 48MS/32WS/32MD/32WD/32XD	Score:	
30 November – 5 December	Indonesia Super 100 I (Draw): Host: TBC, Indonesia; Venue: TBC; Level: Super 100; Prize: $140,000; Format: 48MS/32WS/32MD/32WD/32XD	Score:	
30 November – 5 December	Indonesia Super 100 I (Draw): Host: TBC, Indonesia; Venue: TBC; Level: Super 100; Prize: $140,000; Format: 48MS/32WS/32MD/32WD/32XD	Score:	
30 November – 5 December	Indonesia Super 100 I (Draw): Host: TBC, Indonesia; Venue: TBC; Level: Super 100; Prize: $140,000; Format: 48MS/32WS/32MD/32WD/32XD	Score:	

=== December ===
Date	Tournament	Champions	Runners-up
1–5 December	BWF World Tour Finals (Draw): Host: TBC; Venue: TBC; Level: World Tour Finals; Prize: TBC; Format: 8MS/8WS/8MD/8WD/8XD		
1–5 December	BWF World Tour Finals (Draw): Host: TBC; Venue: TBC; Level: World Tour Finals; Prize: TBC; Format: 8MS/8WS/8MD/8WD/8XD	Score:	
1–5 December	BWF World Tour Finals (Draw): Host: TBC; Venue: TBC; Level: World Tour Finals; Prize: TBC; Format: 8MS/8WS/8MD/8WD/8XD	Score:	
1–5 December	BWF World Tour Finals (Draw): Host: TBC; Venue: TBC; Level: World Tour Finals; Prize: TBC; Format: 8MS/8WS/8MD/8WD/8XD	Score:	
1–5 December	BWF World Tour Finals (Draw): Host: TBC; Venue: TBC; Level: World Tour Finals; Prize: TBC; Format: 8MS/8WS/8MD/8WD/8XD	Score:	
1–5 December	BWF World Tour Finals (Draw): Host: TBC; Venue: TBC; Level: World Tour Finals; Prize: TBC; Format: 8MS/8WS/8MD/8WD/8XD	Score:	

== Statistics ==
=== Performance by countries ===
Below are the 2027 BWF World Tour performances by countries. Only countries who have won a title are listed:

Rank	Team	Total titles	WTF	Super 1000					Super 750					Super 500									Super 300								Super 100							
Rank	Team	Total titles	TBA	MAS	ENG	INA	CHN	DEN	IND	HKG	JPN	FRA	CHN	INA	GER	KOR	SGP	THA	MAS	FIN	JPN	AUS	THA	SUI	FRA	TPE	CAN	USA	GER	MAC	PHI	VIE	CHN	IND	TPE	MAS	INA I	INA II

=== Performance by categories ===
==== Men's singles ====
Rank	Player	BWTF	1000	750	500	300	100	Total

==== Women's singles ====
Rank	Player	BWTF	1000	750	500	300	100	Total

==== Men's doubles ====
Rank	Player	BWTF	1000	750	500	300	100	Total

==== Women's doubles ====
Rank	Player	BWTF	1000	750	500	300	100	Total

==== Mixed doubles ====
Rank	Player	BWTF	1000	750	500	300	100	Total

== World Tour rankings ==
The points are calculated from the following levels:

- BWF World Tour Super 1000
- BWF World Tour Super 750
- BWF World Tour Super 500
- BWF World Tour Super 300
- BWF Tour Super 100

Information on Points, Won, Lost, and % columns were calculated after the .

Key

(D)C	(Defending) Champion
F	Finalists
SF	Semi-finalists
QF	Quarter-finalists
#R	Round 1/2/3
RR	Round Robin
Q#	Qualification Round 1/2
WD	Withdraw

=== Men's singles ===
The table below was based on the ranking of Men's singles as of November 2026.

Rankings	WR	Player	TP	Points	WTF		IND	IND	IND	MAS	IND	INA	THA	GER	ENG	SUI	FRA	PHI	TPE	KOR	HKG	INA	SGP	VIE	CHN	CAN	USA	IND	THA	MAS	JPN	CHN	TPE	INA	FIN	FRA	DEN	MAS	GER	CHN	JPN	AUS	MAC	INA	Won	Lost	%
Rankings	WR	Player	TP	Points	Eli	BWTF	300	100	100	1000	750	500	300	500	1000	300	300	100	300	500	750	1000	500	100	100	300	300	300	500	500	750	1000	100	100	500	750	1000	100	500	750	500	500	300	100	Won	Lost	%
Qualified as World Championships winner
Steady					✓																																										
Qualified by World Tour Finals Ranking
Steady																																															
Steady																																															
Steady																																															
Steady																																															
Steady																																															
Steady																																															
Steady																																															
Steady																																															
Steady																																															
Steady																																															
Steady																																															
Steady																																															
Steady																																															
Steady																																															
Steady																																															
Steady																																															
Steady																																															
Steady																																															
Steady																																															
Steady																																															
Steady																																															
Steady																																															
Steady																																															
Steady																																															
Steady																																															

=== Women's singles ===
The table below was based on the ranking of Women's singles as of November 2026.

Rankings	WR	Player	TP	Points	WTF		IND	IND	IND	MAS	IND	INA	THA	GER	ENG	SUI	FRA	PHI	TPE	KOR	HKG	INA	SGP	VIE	CHN	CAN	USA	IND	THA	MAS	JPN	CHN	TPE	INA	FIN	FRA	DEN	MAS	GER	CHN	JPN	AUS	MAC	INA	Won	Lost	%
Rankings	WR	Player	TP	Points	Eli	BWTF	300	100	100	1000	750	500	300	500	1000	300	300	100	300	500	750	1000	500	100	100	300	300	300	500	500	750	1000	100	100	500	750	1000	100	500	750	500	500	300	100	Won	Lost	%
Qualified as World Championships winner
Steady					✓																																										
Qualified by World Tour Finals Ranking
Steady																																															
Steady																																															
Steady																																															
Steady																																															
Steady																																															
Steady																																															
Steady																																															
Steady																																															
Steady																																															
Steady																																															
Steady																																															
Steady																																															
Steady																																															
Steady																																															
Steady																																															
Steady																																															
Steady																																															
Steady																																															
Steady																																															
Steady																																															
Steady																																															
Steady																																															
Steady																																															
Steady																																															
Steady																																															

=== Men's doubles ===
The table below was based on the ranking of Men's doubles as of November 2026.

Rankings	WR	Player	TP	Points	WTF		IND	IND	IND	MAS	IND	INA	THA	GER	ENG	SUI	FRA	PHI	TPE	KOR	HKG	INA	SGP	VIE	CHN	CAN	USA	IND	THA	MAS	JPN	CHN	TPE	INA	FIN	FRA	DEN	MAS	GER	CHN	JPN	AUS	MAC	INA	Won	Lost	%
Rankings	WR	Player	TP	Points	Eli	BWTF	300	100	100	1000	750	500	300	500	1000	300	300	100	300	500	750	1000	500	100	100	300	300	300	500	500	750	1000	100	100	500	750	1000	100	500	750	500	500	300	100	Won	Lost	%
Qualified as World Championships winner
Steady					✓																																										
Qualified by World Tour Finals Ranking
Steady																																															
Steady																																															
Steady																																															
Steady																																															
Steady																																															
Steady																																															
Steady																																															
Steady																																															
Steady																																															
Steady																																															
Steady																																															
Steady																																															
Steady																																															
Steady																																															
Steady																																															
Steady																																															
Steady																																															
Steady																																															
Steady																																															
Steady																																															
Steady																																															
Steady																																															
Steady																																															
Steady																																															
Steady																																															

=== Women's doubles ===
The table below was based on the ranking of Women's doubles as of November 2026.

Rankings	WR	Player	TP	Points	WTF		IND	IND	IND	MAS	IND	INA	THA	GER	ENG	SUI	FRA	PHI	TPE	KOR	HKG	INA	SGP	VIE	CHN	CAN	USA	IND	THA	MAS	JPN	CHN	TPE	INA	FIN	FRA	DEN	MAS	GER	CHN	JPN	AUS	MAC	INA	Won	Lost	%
Rankings	WR	Player	TP	Points	Eli	BWTF	300	100	100	1000	750	500	300	500	1000	300	300	100	300	500	750	1000	500	100	100	300	300	300	500	500	750	1000	100	100	500	750	1000	100	500	750	500	500	300	100	Won	Lost	%
Qualified as World Championships winner
Steady					✓																																										
Qualified by World Tour Finals Ranking
Steady																																															
Steady																																															
Steady																																															
Steady																																															
Steady																																															
Steady																																															
Steady																																															
Steady																																															
Steady																																															
Steady																																															
Steady																																															
Steady																																															
Steady																																															
Steady																																															
Steady																																															
Steady																																															
Steady																																															
Steady																																															
Steady																																															
Steady																																															
Steady																																															
Steady																																															
Steady																																															
Steady																																															
Steady																																															

=== Mixed doubles ===
The table below was based on the ranking of Mixed doubles as of November 2026.

Rankings	WR	Player	TP	Points	WTF		IND	IND	IND	MAS	IND	INA	THA	GER	ENG	SUI	FRA	PHI	TPE	KOR	HKG	INA	SGP	VIE	CHN	CAN	USA	IND	THA	MAS	JPN	CHN	TPE	INA	FIN	FRA	DEN	MAS	GER	CHN	JPN	AUS	MAC	INA	Won	Lost	%
Rankings	WR	Player	TP	Points	Eli	BWTF	300	100	100	1000	750	500	300	500	1000	300	300	100	300	500	750	1000	500	100	100	300	300	300	500	500	750	1000	100	100	500	750	1000	100	500	750	500	500	300	100	Won	Lost	%
Qualified as World Championships winner
Steady					✓																																										
Qualified by World Tour Finals Ranking
Steady																																															
Steady																																															
Steady																																															
Steady																																															
Steady																																															
Steady																																															
Steady																																															
Steady																																															
Steady																																															
Steady																																															
Steady																																															
Steady																																															
Steady																																															
Steady																																															
Steady																																															
Steady																																															
Steady																																															
Steady																																															
Steady																																															
Steady																																															
Steady																																															
Steady																																															
Steady																																															
Steady																																															
Steady																																															
