= BWF World Tour =

Badminton Tournament structure

The BWF World Tour is a Grade 2 badminton tournament series, sanctioned by the Badminton World Federation (BWF). It is a competition open to the top world ranked players in singles (men's and women's) and doubles (men's, women's and mixed). The competition was announced on 19 March 2017 and came into effect starting from 2018, replacing the BWF Super Series, which was held from 2007 to 2017.

== Structure ==
The BWF Grade 2 tournament hierarchy comprises six levels: the World Tour Finals at Level 1, followed by the Super 1000, Super 750, Super 500, Super 300, and Super 100 tournaments at Levels 2 to 6 respectively. The number of tournaments and the status of the Super 100 level have changed between World Tour cycles.

=== 2018–2022 ===
During the inaugural cycle, the planned annual programme comprised the World Tour Finals and 26 regular World Tour tournaments: three Super 1000, five Super 750, seven Super 500, and eleven Super 300 tournaments. Super 100 tournaments were additionally designated as the BWF Tour Super 100 and awarded ranking points, but were separately branded from the HSBC BWF World Tour.

=== 2023–2026 ===
For the 2023–2026 cycle, the programme expanded to the World Tour Finals and 30 regular World Tour tournaments: four Super 1000, six Super 750, nine Super 500, and eleven Super 300 tournaments. Super 100 tournaments continued to be designated separately as the BWF Tour Super 100.

=== 2027–2030 ===
For the 2027–2030 cycle, the BWF introduced a unified six-level structure in which Super 100 tournaments were fully integrated into the World Tour. The annual programme comprises 36 tournaments: the World Tour Finals, five Super 1000, five Super 750, nine Super 500, eight Super 300, and eight Super 100 tournaments.

== Features ==
=== Prize money ===
This table shows minimum total prize money for each level of BWF World Tour tournament. The minimum total prize money was reduced in 2021 due to the COVID-19 pandemic. All values are in United States dollar.

Year	2018	2019	2020	2021	2022	2023	2024	2025	2026	2027
World Tour Finals	1,500,000					2,500,000		3,000,000	3,500,000	
Super 1000	1,000,000		1,100,000	850,000	1,000,000	1,250,000	1,300,000	1,450,000		2,000,000
Super 750	700,000		750,000	600,000	700,000	850,000		950,000		1,100,000
Super 500	350,000		400,000	320,000	350,000	420,000		475,000	500,000	560,000
Super 300	150,000		170,000	140,000	150,000	210,000		240,000	250,000	290,000
Super 100	75,000		90,000	75,000		100,000		110,000	120,000	140,000

The prize money is distributed via the following formula:

$Total\ prize\ money\ \times \frac{Percentage}{100}$

World Tour Finals

Round	Men's singles	Women's singles	Men's doubles	Women's doubles	Mixed doubles
Winner	8.00%	8.00%	8.40%	8.40%	8.40%
Runner-up	4.00%	4.00%	4.00%	4.00%	4.00%
Semi-finalist	2.00%	2.00%	2.00%	2.00%	2.00%
3rd in Group	1.10%	1.10%	1.30%	1.30%	1.30%
4th in Group	0.60%	0.60%	0.70%	0.70%	0.70%

Super 1000 and Super 750

Round	Men's singles	Women's singles	Men's doubles	Women's doubles	Mixed doubles
Winner	7.00%	7.00%	7.40%	7.40%	7.40%
Runner-up	3.40%	3.40%	3.50%	3.50%	3.50%
Semi-finalist	1.4%	1.4%	1.4%	1.4%	1.4%
Quarter-finalist	0.55%	0.55%	0.625%	0.625%	0.625%
Last 16	0.3%	0.3%	0.325%	0.325%	0.325%
Last 32	0.1%	0.1%	0.1%	0.1%	0.1%

Super 500, Super 300, and Super 100

Round	Men's singles	Women's singles	Men's doubles	Women's doubles	Mixed doubles
Winner	7.5%	7.5%	7.9%	7.9%	7.9%
Runner-up	3.8%	3.8%	3.8%	3.8%	3.8%
Semi-finalist	1.45%	1.45%	1.40%	1.40%	1.40%
Quarter-finalist	0.6%	0.6%	0.725%	0.725%	0.725%
Last 16	0.35%	0.35%	0.375%	0.375%	0.375%

=== World Ranking points ===
Players and pairs earn world ranking points according to the level of the tournament and the round reached. A separate BWF World Tour Ranking accumulates these points during each season and is used to determine qualification for the BWF World Tour Finals.

=== Entries ===
The following entry deadlines, draw sizes, and qualifying arrangements applied to the BWF World Tour structure from 2018 through 2026.

Entry requirements (2018–2026)
Level	Entry deadline	Draw size	Qualifying round
Super 1000	42 days before the start of the tournament	All disciplines: 32 (32 main-draw entries)	No
Super 750	42 days before the start of the tournament	All disciplines: 32 (32 main-draw entries)	No
Super 500	42 days before the start of the tournament	All disciplines: 32 (28 main-draw entries + 4 qualifiers)	Yes, if held
Super 300	35 days before the start of the tournament	All disciplines: 32 (28 main-draw entries + 4 qualifiers)	Yes, if held
Super 100	35 days before the start of the tournament	Men's singles: 48 (40 main-draw entries + 8 qualifiers); Other disciplines: 32 (28 main-draw entries + 4 qualifiers)	Yes, if held

=== Nationality separation ===
Level	Nationality separation
Level 2	Players from the same nation are not separated in the main draw
Level 3	Players from the same nation are not separated in the main draw
Level 4	Players from the same nation are not separated in the main draw
Level 5	Players from the same nation are not separated in the main draw

=== Player commitment regulations ===
Under the regulations in force from 8 November 2025, players ranked in the top 15 in men's and women's singles and pairs ranked in the top 10 in men's, women's, and mixed doubles as of the third week of November in the preceding year are designated as "Top Committed Players". They are required to compete in all four Super 1000 tournaments, all six Super 750 tournaments, and at least two of the nine Super 500 tournaments during the calendar year, as well as the World Tour Finals if qualified. Players who enter those ranking positions in the first week of July are required to compete in the remaining Super 1000 and Super 750 tournaments, the World Tour Finals if qualified, and at least one Super 500 tournament during the remainder of the year.

Failure to meet the mandatory participation requirements carries an additional penalty of US$5,000, imposed in addition to the applicable withdrawal fees; BWF may also consider further disciplinary action. BWF may waive the additional penalty in cases of injury supported by a valid medical certificate or in certain exceptional circumstances, including forced military service, player suspension, or official retirement following the submission of the prescribed retirement form.

=== Umpires ===
Current regulations state that at least six umpires must be from member associations other than the host member association, at least four BWF and two continental certificated umpires with well spread nationality. All umpires and service judges shall meet the eligibility criteria set for the panel of Technical Officials they belong to.

== Tournaments ==
Every four years, the BWF Council reviews countries hosting BWF World Tour events.

Apart from the BWF World Tour Finals, there are 4 Super 1000, 6 Super 750, 9 Super 500, and 11 Super 300 tournaments in a season. Super 100 tournaments are selected every year with 11 tournaments selected in 2018. From 2019, Scottish Open was relegated to International Challenge. In 2021-2026, Dutch Open became an International Challenge.

● Super 1000
● Super 750
● Super 500
● Super 300
● Super 100
● Cancelled

Tournament	Season												
Tournament	2018	2019	2020	2021	2022	2023	2024	2025	2026	2027	2028	2029	2030
S1000
All England Open	●	●	●	●	●	●	●	●	●	●	●	●	●
China Open	●	●	●	●	●	●	●	●	●	●	●	●	●
Denmark Open	●	●	●	●	●	●	●	●	●	●	●	●	●
Indonesia Open	●	●	●	●	●	●	●	●	●	●	●	●	●
Malaysia Open	●	●	●	●	●	●	●	●	●	●	●	●	●
S750
China Masters	●	●	●	●	●	●	●	●	●	●	●	●	●
(France) French Open	●	●	●	●	●	●	●	●	●	●	●	●	●
Hong Kong Open	●	●	●	●	●	●	●	●	●	●	●	●	●
India Open	●	●	●	●	●	●	●	●	●	●	●	●	●
Japan Open	●	●	●	●	●	●	●	●	●	●	●	●	●
S500
(Finland) Arctic Open						●	●	●	●	●	●	●	●
(Australia) Australian Open	●	●	●	●	●	●	●	●	●	●	●	●	●
(Germany) German Open	●	●	●	●	●	●	●	●	●	●	●	●	●
Indonesia Masters	●	●	●	●	●	●	●	●	●	●	●	●	●
Japan Masters						●	●	●	●	●	●	●	●
(South Korea) Korea Open	●	●	●	●	●	●	●	●	●	●	●	●	●
Malaysia Masters	●	●	●	●	●	●	●	●	●	●	●	●	●
Singapore Open	●	●	●	●	●	●	●	●	●	●	●	●	●
Thailand Open	●	●	● ●	●	●	●	●	●	●	●	●	●	●
S300
Canada Open	●	●	●	●	●	●	●	●	●	●	●	●	●
(Germany) Hylo Open	●	●	●	●	●	●	●	●	●	●	●	●	●
(South Korea) Korea Masters	●	●	●	●	●	●	●	●	●				
Macau Open	●	●	●	●	●		●	●	●	●	●	●	●
New Zealand Open	●	●	●	●	●								
(France) Orléans Masters	●	●	●	●	●	●	●	●	●	●	●	●	●
Spain Masters	●	●	●	●	●	●	●	●	●				
(Switzerland) Swiss Open	●	●	●	●	●	●	●	●	●	●	●	●	●
(Chinese Taipei) Taipei Open	●	●	●	●	●	●	●	●	●	●	●	●	●
Thailand Masters	●	●	●	●		●	●	●	●	●	●	●	●
(United States) U.S. Open	●	●	●	●	●	●	●	●	●	●	●	●	●
S100
(United Arab Emirates) Al Ain Masters						●	●	●	●				
(Japan) Akita Masters	●	●	●	●	●								
Baoji China Masters							●	●	●				
(Netherlands) Dutch Open	●	●	●							●	●	●	●
(India) Guwahati Masters						●	●	●	●				
(India) Hyderabad Open	●	●	●	●									
Indonesia Masters Super 100 I	●	●	●	●	●	●	●	●	●	●	●	●	●
Indonesia Masters Super 100 II						●	●	●	●				
(Chinese Taipei) Kaohsiung Masters						●	●	●	●	●	●	●	●
Malaysia Super 100						●	●	●	●	●	●	●	●
(India) Odisha Masters					●	●	●	●	●				
Philippines Open										●	●	●	●
Ruichang China Masters	●	●	●	●		●	●	●	●				
(Russia) Russian Open	●	●	●	●									
(Scotland) Scottish Open	●												
(India) Syed Modi International	●	●	●	●	●	●	●	●	●	●	●	●	●
Vietnam Open	●	●	●	●	●	●	●	●	●	●	●	●	●

== World Tour Finals ==
At the end of each World Tour season, the eight highest-ranked players or pairs in each discipline in the BWF World Tour Rankings are invited to compete in the BWF World Tour Finals, subject to a maximum of two players or pairs from the same member association. Only the best 14 World Tour results during the season count towards qualification, including a maximum of three results from Super 100 tournaments.

In a non-Olympic year, BWF grants an invitation to the reigning world champion, while in an Olympic year the invitation is granted to the reigning Olympic champion, if the player or pair has not qualified through the World Tour Rankings and is ranked in the top 20 of the World Rankings on the date of invitation. The field remains limited to eight entries in each discipline, and the invitation is subject to the maximum of two entries from one member association.

If two or more players or pairs are tied in the World Tour Rankings, qualification is determined by the following criteria:

1. The player or pair who participated in the most World Tour tournaments during the season;
2. The player or pair who earned the most World Tour ranking points in tournaments held from 1 July onwards;
3. The drawing of lots, if the tie remains.

The 2026 edition is scheduled to offer total prize money of US$3.5 million.

== Performance by nations ==
The tables below show BWF World Tour titles by country. Only countries that have won at least one title are listed. When a doubles pair represents two different countries, each country is credited with 0.5 title.

As of the 2026 Hong Kong Open

=== World Tour Finals, Super 1000, Super 750, Super 500, and Super 300 ===
No.	Team	2018	2019	2020	2021	2022	2023	2024	2025	2026	Total
1	China	25	33	5	1	28	47	53	36	39	267
2	Japan	37	26	6	16	10	20	16	15	23	169
3	South Korea	11	18	4	6	10	25	14	31	14	133
4	Indonesia	20	19	6	6	13	13	12	10	12	111
5	Denmark	8	5	7	5	6	13	13	9.5	10	76.5
6	Thailand	4	8	5	5	8	6	13	15	4	68
7	Chinese Taipei	12	12	5		5	8	8	8	7	65
8	Malaysia	8	4	1	2	7	7	11	11	11	62
9	India	3	2			7	6	5	3	11	37
10	France				2			3	4	8	17
11	Hong Kong	2	3	1		2	2	2	1	1	14
12	Spain	2	2	2	1		1	2			10
13	Singapore		1		1	1		1	4		8
14	England			2				2	1		5
15	Canada	1	1							2	4
15	United States	1					2		1		4
17	Germany	1		1		1					3
18	Bulgaria					1					1
18	Russia		1								1
20	Netherlands								0.5		0.5

=== Super 100 ===
As of the 2026 Kaohsiung Masters

No.	Team	2018	2019	2020	2021	2022	2023	2024	2025	2026	Total
1	China	8	14			3	4	13	11	18	71
2	Indonesia	6	7			3	7	9	11	4	47
3	Japan	9	3			4	7	7	7	1	38
4	Chinese Taipei	2	3				7	6	4	6	28
5	India	5	4			3	6	3	5		26
6	Malaysia	2	1			2	6	3	2	2	18
7	South Korea	2.5	8						2	3	15.5
8	Thailand	2			2	1	3	3	3	1	15
9	Denmark	2	2	2	1		2		1		10
10	Bulgaria	4	1	1		1			2		9
10	England	7	1		1						9
12	France		1	1	1	2					5
13	Singapore	1	1			1	1				4
14	Hong Kong	1	1						1		3
14	Netherlands	1	1			1					3
14	Vietnam					1	1	1			3
17	Australia		1				1				2
17	Scotland	1		1							2
19	Russia	0.5	1								1.5
20	Canada					1					1
20	Finland								1		1
20	Germany	1									1
20	Sri Lanka					1					1

== Records and statistics ==
=== Most titles in a season ===
The following table lists players who have won at least nine BWF World Tour titles in a single season.

Rank	Player	Event	Titles	Season	Ref.
1	(South Korea) An Se-young	Women's singles	11	2025	
1	(South Korea) Seo Seung-jae	Men's doubles	11	2025	
3	(South Korea) Kim Won-ho	Men's doubles	10	2025	
4	(Japan) Kento Momota	Men's singles	9	2019	

=== Youngest and oldest champions ===
As of the 2026 Korea Masters

The following tables list the youngest and oldest players to win a title at each level of the BWF World Tour. A player's age is calculated on the date of the tournament final. In doubles events, the record is attributed individually to the player.

==== Youngest champions ====
Level	Player	Event	Age	Tournament
World Tour Finals	(South Korea) An Se-young	Women's singles	19 years, 303 days	2021
Super 1000	(China) Liu Shengshu	Women's doubles	19 years, 281 days	2024 Malaysia Open
Super 750	(South Korea) An Se-young	Women's singles	17 years, 264 days	2019 French Open
Super 500	(China) Liu Shengshu	Women's doubles	18 years, 296 days	2023 Indonesia Masters
Super 300	(South Korea) An Se-young	Women's singles	17 years, 89 days	2019 New Zealand Open
Super 100	(India) Unnati Hooda	Women's singles	14 years, 132 days	2022 Odisha Open

==== Oldest champions ====
Level	Player	Event	Age	Tournament
World Tour Finals	(Denmark) Anders Skaarup Rasmussen	Men's doubles	35 years, 304 days	2024
Super 1000	(Chinese Taipei) Chou Tien-chen	Men's singles	36 years, 199 days	2026 China Open
Super 750	(Malaysia) Lee Chong Wei	Men's singles	35 years, 253 days	2018 Malaysia Open
Super 500	(Chinese Taipei) Chou Tien-chen	Men's singles	35 years, 277 days	2025 Arctic Open
Super 300	(Denmark) Mathias Boe	Men's doubles	37 years, 229 days	2018 Swiss Open
Super 100	(Denmark) Mathias Boe	Men's doubles	39 years, 10 days	2019 Russian Open

== Title sponsor ==
- HSBC (2018–2026)
