= 2027 Tour de Ski =

21st edition of the Tour de Ski

Tour de Ski
2026–27 FIS Cross-Country World Cup

Ski tour details
- Venue(s): Les Rousses, France; Oberstdorf, Germany; Val di Fiemme, Italy
- Dates: 1 January 2027 – 10 January 2027
- Stages: 8

The 2027 Tour de Ski will be the 21st edition of the Tour de Ski and part of the 2026–27 FIS Cross-Country World Cup. The World Cup stage event will start in Les Rousses, France on 1 January 2027 and conclude with the traditional Final Climb stage in Val di Fiemme, Italy, on 10 January 2027. The tour will take place in France for the first time.

Norwegian Johannes Høsflot Klæbo and retired American Jessie Diggins were the winners of the previous edition.

== Schedule ==
Stage	Venue	Date	Event	Technique	Distance	Start time (CET)	
Stage	Venue	Date	Event	Technique	Distance	Women	Men
1	(France) Les Rousses	1 January 2027	Sprint	Classic	1.3 km	14:15	14:15
2	(France) Les Rousses	2 January 2027	Distance, mass start	Classic	20 km	10:15	14:15
3	(France) Les Rousses	3 January 2027	Distance, pursuit	Free	15 km	13:15	15:30
4	(Germany) Oberstdorf	5 January 2027	Distance, mass start	Classic	15 km	15:40	13:15
5	(Germany) Oberstdorf	6 January 2027	Distance, heat mass start	Free	5 km	13:00	15:00
6	(Italy) Val di Fiemme	8 January 2027	Distance, mass start	Skiathlon	15 km	13:00	15:30
7	(Italy) Val di Fiemme	9 January 2027	Sprint	Free	1.5 km	15:00	15:00
8	(Italy) Val di Fiemme	10 January 2027	Final Climb, mass start	Free	10 km	12:35	15:40

== Overall leadership ==
Three main individual classifications will be contested in the 2026–27 Tour de Ski, as well as a team competition. The most important is the overall standings, calculated by adding each skier's finishing times on each stage. Time bonuses (time subtracted) are awarded at both sprint stages, where the winners are awarded 60 bonus seconds. The skier with the lowest cumulative time becomes the overall winner of the Tour de Ski. For the fourth time in Tour history, the skier leading the overall standings will win a gold bib.

Bonus seconds for the top 30 positions by type
Type		1	2	3	4	5	6	7	8	9	10	11	12	13–15	16–20	21–25	26–30
In finish
In finish	Sprint	60	54	48	46	44	42	32	30	28	26	24	22	10	8	6	4
In finish	Interval start	none															
In finish	Pursuit	none															
In finish	Mass start	none															

The second competition is the sprints standings. The skiers who receive the highest number of points during the Tour win the sprint classification. The points available for each stage finish are determined by the stage's type. The leader is identified by a silver bib.

Sprint standings points for the top 10 positions by type
Type		1	2	3	4	5	6	7	8	9	10
In finish	Sprint	30	24	20	16	12	10	8	6	4	2
Intermediate sprint	Mass start	15	12	10	8	6	5	4	3	2	1
Intermediate sprint	Heat mass start	5	3	2							

The third competition is the new competition called climbing standings. The skiers who receive the highest number of points on the top of the hills during the Tour win the climbing classification. The points available for each stage finish are determined by the stage's type. The leader is identified by a violet bib.

Climbing standings points for the top 10 positions by type
Type		1	2	3	4	5	6	7	8	9	10
In finish	Stage 8 (Alpe Cermis)	30	24	20	16	12	10	8	6	4	2
Intermediate sprint	Interval start	10	8	6	4	2					
Intermediate sprint	Heat mass start	5	3	2							

The final competition is a team competition. This is calculated using the finishing times of the best two skiers of both genders per team on each stage; the leading team is the team with the lowest cumulative time.

Classification leadership by stage
Stage	Men				Women			
Stage	Winner	Overall standings	Sprint standings	Climbing standings	Winner	Overall standings	Sprint standings	Climbing standings
1				–				–
2								
3								
4								
5								
6								
7								
8								
Final					Final			

== Standings ==
Legend
Denotes the leader of the Overall standings	Denotes the leader of the Sprint standings	Denotes the leader of the Climbing standings

=== Overall standings ===
==== Men ====
Overall standings after stage 1 (1–10)
Rank	Name	Time
1		
2		
3		
4		
5		
6		
7		
8		
9		
10		

Overall standings after stage 1 (11–20)
Rank	Name	Time
11		
12		
13		
14		
15		
16		
17		
18		
19		
20		

==== Women ====
Overall standings after stage 1 (1–10)
Rank	Name	Time
1		
2		
3		
4		
5		
6		
7		
8		
9		
10		

Overall standings after stage 1 (11–20)
Rank	Name	Time
11		
12		
13		
14		
15		
16		
17		
18		
19		
20		

=== Sprint standings ===
==== Men ====
Sprint standings after stage 1 (1–10)
Rank	Name	Points
1		
2		
3		
4		
5		
6		
7		
8		
9		
10		

==== Women ====
Sprint standings after stage 1 (1–10)
Rank	Name	Points
1		
2		
3		
4		
5		
6		
7		
8		
9		
10		

=== Climbing standings ===
==== Men ====
Climbing standings after stage 1 (1–10)
Rank	Name	Points
1		
2		
3		
4		
5		
6		
7		
8		
9		
10		

==== Women ====
Climbing standings after stage 1 (1–10)
Rank	Name	Points
1		
2		
3		
4		
5		
6		
7		
8		
9		
10		

=== Team standings ===
Team standings after stage 1 (1–5)
Rank	Nation	Time
1		
2		
3		
4		
5		

== Stages ==
=== Stage 1 ===
1 January 2027, Les Rousses, France

- Bonus seconds to the 30 skiers that qualifies for the quarter-finals, distributed as following:
  - Final: 60–54–48–46–44–42
  - Semi-final: 32–30–28–26–24–22
  - Quarter-final: 10–10–10–8–8–8–8–8–6–6–6–6–6–4–4–4–4–4

Men – 1.3 km Sprint Classic
Rank	Name	QT	Time	BS
1				60
2				54
3				48
4				46
5				44
6				42
7			SF	32
8			SF	30
9			SF	28
10			SF	26

Women – 1.3 km Sprint Classic
Rank	Name	QT	Time	BS
1				60
2				54
3				48
4				46
5				44
6				42
7			SF	32
8			SF	30
9			SF	28
10			SF	26

=== Stage 2 ===
2 January 2027, Les Rousses, France

- No bonus seconds are awarded on this stage.

Men – 20 km Mass Start Classic
Rank	Name	Time
1		
2		
3		
4		
5		
6		
7		
8		
9		
10		

Women – 20 km Mass Start Classic
Rank	Name	Time
1		
2		
3		
4		
5		
6		
7		
8		
9		
10		

=== Stage 3 ===
3 January 2027, Les Rousses, France

- No bonus seconds are awarded on this stage.

Men – 15 km Pursuit Free
Rank	Name	Time
1		
2		
3		
4		
5		
6		
7		
8		
9		
10		

Women – 15 km Pursuit Free
Rank	Name	Time
1		
2		
3		
4		
5		
6		
7		
8		
9		
10		

=== Stage 4 ===
5 January 2027, Oberstdorf, Germany

- No bonus seconds are awarded on this stage.

Men – 15 km Mass Start Classic
Rank	Name	Time
1		
2		
3		
4		
5		
6		
7		
8		
9		
10		

Women – 15 km Mass Start Classic
Rank	Name	Time
1		
2		
3		
4		
5		
6		
7		
8		
9		
10		

=== Stage 5 ===
6 January 2027, Oberstdorf, Germany

- No bonus seconds are awarded on this stage. New format.

Men – 5 km Heat Mass Start Free
Rank	Name	Time
1		
2		
3		
4		
5		
6		
7		
8		
9		
10		

Women – 5 km Heat Mass Start Free
Rank	Name	Time
1		
2		
3		
4		
5		
6		
7		
8		
9		
10		

=== Stage 6 ===
8 January 2027, Val di Fiemme, Italy

- Start times based on general classification
- No bonus seconds are awarded on this stage.

Men – 15 km Skiathlon
Rank	Name	Time
1		
2		
3		
4		
5		
6		
7		
8		
9		
10		

Women – 15 km Skiathlon
Rank	Name	Time
1		
2		
3		
4		
5		
6		
7		
8		
9		
10		

=== Stage 7 ===
9 January 2027, Val di Fiemme, Italy

- Bonus seconds to the 30 skiers that qualifies for the quarter-finals, distributed as following:
  - Final: 60–54–48–46–44–42
  - Semi-final: 32–30–28–26–24–22
  - Quarter-final: 10–10–10–8–8–8–8–8–6–6–6–6–6–4–4–4–4–4

Men – 1.5 km Sprint Free
Rank	Name	QT	Time	BS
1				60
2				54
3				48
4				46
5				44
6				42
7			SF	32
8			SF	30
9			SF	28
10			SF	26

Women – 1.5 km Sprint Free
Rank	Name	QT	Time	BS
1				60
2				54
3				48
4				46
5				44
6				42
7			SF	32
8			SF	30
9			SF	28
10			SF	26

=== Stage 8 ===
10 January 2027, Val di Fiemme, Italy

- No bonus seconds are awarded on this stage.

Men – 10 km Final Climb Mass Start Free
Rank	Name	Time
1		
2		
3		
4		
5		
6		
7		
8		
9		
10		

Women – 10 km Final Climb Mass Start Free
Rank	Name	Time
1		
2		
3		
4		
5		
6		
7		
8		
9		
10		

== World Cup points distribution ==
The table shows the number of 2026–27 FIS Cross-Country World Cup points to win in the 2026–27 Tour de Ski for men and women.

Place	1	2	3	4	5	6	7	8	9	10	11	12	13	14	15	16	17	18	19	20	21	22	23	24	25	26	27	28	29	30	31	32	33	34	35	36	37	38	39	40	41	42	43	44	45	46	47	48	49	50
Overall Standings	300	285	270	255	240	225	216	207	198	189	180	174	168	162	156	150	144	138	132	126	120	114	108	102	96	90	84	78	72	66	60	57	54	51	48	45	42	39	36	33	30	27	24	21	18	15	12	9	6	3
Each Stage	50	47	44	41	38	35	32	30	28	26	24	22	20	18	16	15	14	13	12	11	10	9	8	7	6	5	4	3	2	1

== Sources ==
- Rules for the FIS Cross-Country World Cup Edition 2026/27 (PDF). International Ski Federation. 2026.
- FIS Cross-Country World Cup 2026/27 (PDF). International Ski Federation. 2026.
