= 62nd Vanier Cup =

2027 Canadian university football championship

- Date: November 27, 2027
- Stadium: Telus Université Laval Stadium
- Location: Quebec City, Quebec

The 2027 Vanier Cup, the 62nd edition of the Canadian university football championship, is scheduled for November 27, 2027, at Telus Université Laval Stadium in Quebec City, Quebec.

== Host ==
This is scheduled to be the ninth time that Quebec City will host the Vanier Cup and the second consecutive year of hosting following the 2026 game.

== Semi-Championships ==
The Vanier Cup is played between the champions of the Mitchell Bowl and the Uteck Bowl, the national semi-final games. In 2027, according to the rotating schedule, the Yates Cup Ontario championship team will host the Québec conference Jacques Dussault Cup championship team for the Mitchell Bowl. The winners of the Canada West Hardy Trophy championship will visit the Atlantic conference's Loney Bowl championship team for the Uteck Bowl.
