= 2027 World Rowing Championships =

International rowing event

- Venue: Rotsee
- Location: Lucerne, Switzerland
- Dates: 23–29 August

The 55th World Rowing Championships will be held from 23 to 29 August 2027 in Lucerne, Switzerland, under the organization of World Rowing.
