= 2027 ICF Canoe Sprint World Championships =

- Venue: Lake Malta
- Location: Szeged, Hungary

The 2027 ICF Canoe Sprint World Championships will be held from in Szeged, Hungary.
