= 2027 Masters Tournament =

Golf tournament

Tournament information
- Dates: April 8–11, 2027
- Location: Augusta, Georgia, U.S. 33°30′09″N 82°01′12″W
- Course: Augusta National Golf Club
- Tours: PGA Tour; DP World Tour

Statistics
- Par: 72
- Location in the United States Location in Georgia

The 2027 Masters Tournament is scheduled for April 8–11, 2027, at Augusta National Golf Club in Augusta, Georgia, United States. It will be the 91st edition of the Masters Tournament and the first of the year's four men's major golf championships. Rory McIlroy is the defending champion.

== Course ==
2026 Masters Tournament scorecard
Hole	Name	Yards	Par	Hole	Name	Yards	Par
1	Tea Olive	445	4	10	Camellia	495	4
2	Pink Dogwood	585	5	11	White Dogwood	520	4
3	Flowering Peach	350	4	12	Golden Bell	155	3
4	Flowering Crab Apple	240	3	13	Azalea	545	5
5	Magnolia	495	4	14	Chinese Fir	440	4
6	Juniper	180	3	15	Firethorn	550	5
7	Pampas	450	4	16	Redbud	170	3
8	Yellow Jasmine	570	5	17	Nandina	450	4
9	Carolina Cherry	460	4	18	Holly	465	4
Out		3,775	36	In		3,790	36
Total						7,565	72

== Field ==
Entry is by invitation. The criteria include past Masters champions, recent winners of the other men's majors and The Players Championship, leading finishers in the previous year's majors, winners of eligible PGA Tour events, qualifiers for the previous year's Tour Championship, and players who qualify through designated amateur championships. Players in the top 50 of the Official World Golf Ranking qualify through either the year-end 2026 ranking or the ranking published the week before the tournament. The Masters Committee may issue special invitations to international players.

In September 2026, Augusta National and The R&A announced that invitations would continue to go to winners of the Scottish Open, Spanish Open, Japan Open, Hong Kong Open, Australian Open, and South African Open.

Players who are previous winners of the tournament included:

1. Past Masters winners

- Ángel Cabrera
- Fred Couples
- Sergio García
- Dustin Johnson
- Zach Johnson
- Hideki Matsuyama
- Rory McIlroy
- José María Olazábal
- Jon Rahm
- Patrick Reed
- Scottie Scheffler
- Charl Schwartzel
- Adam Scott
- Vijay Singh
- Jordan Spieth
- Bubba Watson
- Mike Weir
- Danny Willett
- Tiger Woods
- Past winners who are excepted not to play: Tommy Aaron, Charles Coody, Ben Crenshaw, Nick Faldo, Raymond Floyd, Trevor Immelman, Bernhard Langer, Sandy Lyle, Phil Mickelson, Larry Mize, Jack Nicklaus, Mark O'Meara, Gary Player, Craig Stadler, Tom Watson, Ian Woosnam

== Pre-tournament events ==
Practice rounds are scheduled for April 5–7, with the Par 3 Contest on April 7.

== Broadcasting ==
In the United States, Paramount+ is scheduled to stream live coverage, including the CBS broadcasts of the third and final rounds. The Masters own website and app will provide free streams of the competition as well.
