= 2026 BWF World Tour Finals =

2026 badminton tournament in Hangzhou, China

Tournament details
- Dates: 9–13 December
- Edition: 9th
- Level: World Tour Finals
- Total prize money: US$3,500,000
- Venue: Hangzhou Olympic Sports Centre Gymnasium
- Location: Xiacheng, Hangzhou, China

The 2026 BWF World Tour Finals (officially was the HSBC BWF World Tour Finals 2026 for sponsorship reasons) will be the final tournament of the 2026 BWF World Tour. It will be held from 9 to 13 December 2026 in Hangzhou, China and features a total prize pool of $3,500,000.

== Tournament ==
The 2026 BWF World Tour is the ninth edition of the BWF World Tour Finals and organized by the Chinese Badminton Association with sanction from the BWF.

=== Point distribution ===
Below is the point distribution table for each phase of the tournament based on the BWF points system for the BWF World Tour Finals event.

Winner(s)	Runner(s)-up	Semi-finalists	3rd in group	4th in group
14,000	12,000	10,000	8,900	7,800

=== Prize money ===
The total prize money for this year's tournament is US$3,500,000. Distribution of prize money was in accordance with BWF regulations.

Achievement	Winner(s)	Runner(s)-up	Semi-finalist(s)	3rd in group	4th in group
Singles	$280,000	$140,000	$70,000	$38,500	$21,000
Doubles	$294,000	$140,000	$70,000	$45,500	$24,500

== Representatives ==
=== Eligible players ===
Below are the eligible players for World Tour Finals. The top eight players, or pairs in doubles categories, in the BWF World Ranking are eligible to play in the tournament, with a maximum of two players or pairs representing each national member association.

==== Men's singles ====
Seeds	Rank	NOCs	Players	Performances		
Seeds	Rank	NOCs	Players	Winner	Runner-up	Semifinalists
1	1	France (1)	Christo Popov	3 Super 750: Japan Open, French Open; Super 300: German Open		3 Super 750: China Masters, Denmark Open; Super 500: Malaysia Masters
2	2	Denmark (1)	Anders Antonsen	3 Super 500: Arctic Open, Thailand Open, Hong Kong Open	1 Super 750: Denmark Open	2 Super 1000: Malaysia Open; Super 750: China Masters; Super 500: Hylo Open
3/4	3	Indonesia (1)	Alwi Farhan	2 Super 500: Indonesia Masters, Australian Open		3 Super 750: Singapore Open; Super 500: Japan Masters; Super 300: Thailand Masters
3/4	4	Canada (1)	Victor Lai	2 Super 1000: Indonesia Open; Super 500: Korea Open		5 Super 1000: All England Open, China Open; Super 750: India Open, Denmark Open; Super 300: Canada Open
5/8	5	Thailand (1)	Kunlavut Vitidsarn	1 Super 1000: Malaysia Open	2 Super 500: Thailand Open, Hong Kong Open	2 Super 1000: All England Open; Super 500: Japan Masters
5/8	6	India (1)	Lakshya Sen	2 Super 500: Hylo Open, Japan Masters	1 Super 1000: All England Open	1 Super 500: Hong Kong Open
5/8	7	Chinese Taipei (1)		1 Super 1000: China Open		1 Super 1000: Indonesia Open; Super 500: Thailand Open; Super 300: Taipei Open
5/8	8	France (2)	Alex Lanier	3 Super 750: Singapore Open, Denmark Open; Super 300: Orléans Masters		1 Super 750: French Open

==== Women's singles ====
Seeds	Rank	NOCs	Players	Performances		
Seeds	Rank	NOCs	Players	Winner	Runner-up	Semifinalists
1	1	Japan (1)	Akane Yamaguchi	4 Super 1000: China Open; Super 500: Thailand Open, Australian Open, Japan Masters	5 Super 1000: Indonesia Open; Super 750: Singapore Open, Japan Open, Denmark Open; Super 500: Korea Open	2 Super 1000: All England Open; Super 750: China Masters
2	2	South Korea (1)	An Se-young	8 Super 1000: Malaysia Open, Indonesia Open; Super 750: India Open, Singapore Open, China Masters, Denmark Open, French Open; Super 500: Korea Open	1 Super 1000: All England Open	
3/4	3	China (1)	Wang Zhiyi	2 Super 1000: All England Open; Super 500: Hong Kong Open	5 Super 1000: Malaysia OpenSuper 750: India Open; Super 500: Japan MastersSuper 300: German Open	5 Super 1000: China Open; Super 750: Singapore Open, China Masters, Denmark Open; Super 500: Korea Open
3/4	4	China (2)	Chen Yufei	1 Super 500: Indonesia Masters	3 Super 1000: China Open; Super 500: Thailand Open, Malaysia Masters	8 Super 1000: Malaysia Open, All England Open, Indonesia Open; Super 750: India Open, Singapore Open, Japan Open; Super 500: Japan Masters
5/8	5	India (1)	P. V. Sindhu	2 Super 750: Japan Open; Super 500: Arctic Open	1 Super 750: French Open	
5/8	6	Thailand (1)	Pornpawee Chochuwong		2 Super 500: Australian Open, Hong Kong Open	1 Super 500: Hylo Open
5/8	7	Thailand (2)	Ratchanok Intanon	1 Super 500: Malaysia Masters	1 Super 500: Arctic Open	2 Super 750: India Open; Super 500: Hong Kong Open
5/8	8	Japan (2)	Tomoka Miyazaki	Super 300: German Open	1 Super 750: China Masters	4 Super 1000: China Open; Super 500: Japan Masters, Hong Kong Open; Super 300: German Open

==== Men's doubles ====
Seeds	Rank	NOCs	Players	Performances		
Seeds	Rank	NOCs	Players	Winner	Runner-up	Semifinalists
1	1	Malaysia (1)	Goh Sze Fei; Nur Izzudin	2 Super 1000: Indonesia Open; Super 500: Indonesia Masters	2 Super 750: French Open; Super 500: Malaysia Masters	2 Super 750: Japan Open; Super 500: Thailand Open
2	2	South Korea (1)	Kim Won-ho; Seo Seung-jae	3 Super 1000: Malaysia Open, All England Open; Super 500: Korea Open	2 Super 1000: China Open; Super 750: Japan Open	3 Super 1000: Indonesia Open; Super 750: Singapore Open, Denmark Open
3/4	3	Japan(1)	Takuro Hoki; Yugo Kobayashi		2 Super 500: Korea Open, Japan Masters	1 Super 750: Japan Open
3/4	4	Indonesia (1)	Fajar Alfian; Muhammad Shohibul Fikri	3 Super 1000: China Open; Super 750: Japan Open, Denmark Open	1 Super 750: Singapore Open	1 Super 1000: Malaysia Open
5/8	5	China (1)	Liang Weikeng; Wang Chang	1 Super 750: India Open		5 Super 1000: China Open; Super 750: Singapore Open, Denmark Open; Super 500: Australian Open; Super 300: German Open
5/8	6	England (1)	Ben Lane; Sean Vendy		1 Super 500: Hylo Open	3 Super 1000: Malaysia Open, China Open; Super 300: U.S. Open
5/8	7	Denmark (1)	Daniel Lundgaard; Mads Vestergaard	1 Super 500: Malaysia Masters	1 Super 300: Swiss Open	2 Super 500: Indonesia Masters, Japan Masters
5/8	8	China (2)	Chen Boyang; Liu Yi	2 Super 500: Australian Open; Super 300: German Open		1 Super 1000: All England Open

==== Women's doubles ====
Seeds	Rank	NOCs	Players	Performances		
Seeds	Rank	NOCs	Players	Winner	Runner-up	Semifinalists
1	1	Malaysia (1)	Pearly Tan; Thinaah Muralitharan	3 Super 750: Denmark Open; Super 500: Indonesia Masters, Hong Kong Open	2 Super 750: French Open; Super 300: Taipei Open	2 Super 1000: All England Open; Super 750: India Open
2	2	Japan (1)	Yuki Fukushima; Mayu Matsumoto	2 Super 1000: Indonesia Open; Super 750: French Open	2 Super 1000: China Open; Super 750: India Open	2 Super 1000: Malaysia Open; Super 750: Japan Open
3/4	3	Japan (2)	Rin Iwanaga; Kie Nakanishi	1 Super 500: Japan Masters	1 Super 500: Thailand Open	1 Super 750: French Open
3/4	4	China (1)	Liu Shengshu; Tan Ning	4 Super 1000: Malaysia Open, All England Open, China Open; Super 750: India Open	2 Super 1000: Indonesia Open; Super 750: Singapore Open	
5/8	5	Chinese Taipei (1)	Hsu Yin-hui; Lin Jhih-yun		2 Super 500: Arctic Open, Hylo Open	3 Super 750: Japan Open; Super 500: Australian Open, Japan Masters
5/8	6	Bulgaria (1)	Gabriela Stoeva; Stefani Stoeva	1 Super 100: Odisha Masters		2 Super 500: Hylo Open; Super 300: Swiss Open
5/8	7	Indonesia (1)	Amallia Cahaya Pratiwi; Siti Fadia Silva Ramadhanti	2 Super 500: Hylo Open; Super 300: Thailand Masters		3 Super 500: Hong Kong Open; Super 300: German Open, Macau Open
5/8	8	South Korea (1)	Baek Ha-na; Lee So-hee		2 Super 1000: Malaysia Open, All England Open	3 Super 1000: China Open; Super 750: India Open, Singapore Open

==== Mixed doubles ====
Seeds	Rank	NOCs	Players	Performances		
Seeds	Rank	NOCs	Players	Winner	Runner-up	Semifinalists
1	1	China (1)	Feng Yanzhe; Huang Dongping	6 Super 1000: Malaysia Open; Super 750: Japan Open, China Masters, French Open; Super 500: Australian Open, Hong Kong Open	2 Super 1000: China Open; Super 750: Denmark Open	2 Super 750: India Open; Super 500: Arctic Open
2	2	China (2)	Jiang Zhenbang; Wei Yaxin	5 Super 750: Denmark Open; Super 500: Arctic Open, Korea Open, Japan Masters; Super 300: Macau Open	2 Super 1000: Malaysia Open; Super 500: Hong Kong Open	2 Super 750: India Open; Super 500: Indonesia Masters
3/4	3	Denmark (1)	Mathias Christiansen; Alexandra Bøje	3 Super 1000: Indonesia Open; Super 750: Singapore Open; Super 500: Thailand Open	3 Super 750: India Open; Super 500: Indonesia Masters; Super 300: Orléans Masters	1 Super 500: Malaysia Masters
3/4	4	France (1)	Thom Gicquel; Delphine Delrue	2 Super 500: Hylo Open; Super 300: Orléans Masters	1 Super 1000: All England Open	3 Super 1000: Indonesia Open, China Open; Super 750: French Open
5/8	5	Chinese Taipei (1)	Ye Hong-wei; Nicole Gonzales Chan	1 Super 1000: All England Open		
5/8	6	Japan (1)	Akira Koga; Natsu Saito	1 Super 300: Canada Open		4 Super 750: Japan Open; Super 500: Korea Open, Japan Masters; Super 300: Thailand Masters
5/8	7	Thailand (1)	Dechapol Puavaranukroh; Supissara Paewsampran	1 Super 750: India Open		2 Super 1000: China Open; Super 500: Thailand Open
5/8	8	Japan (2)	Yuta Watanabe; Maya Taguchi	2 Super 300: Taipei Open, Korea Masters		1 Super 500: Japan Masters

== Representatives by nation ==
Top Nations
Rank	Nation	MS	WS	MD	WD	XD	Total	Players
1	China (H)		2	2	1	2	7	12
1	Japan		2	1	2	2	7	12
3	Thailand	1	2			1	4	5
4	Denmark	1		1		1	3	5
4	France	2				1	3	4
4	Indonesia	1		1	1		3	5
4	South Korea		1	1	1		3	5
4	Chinese Taipei	1			1	1	3	5
9	India	1	1				2	2
9	Malaysia			1	1		2	4
11	Bulgaria				1		1	2
11	Canada	1					1	1
11	England			1			1	2
Total		8	8	8	8	8	40	64

== Performances by nation ==
Nation	Group stage	Semi-finals	Final	Winner(s)
China (H)				
Total				

== Men's singles ==
=== Seeds ===
1. (France) Christo Popov
2. (Denmark) Anders Antonsen
3. (Indonesia) Alwi Farhan
4. (Canada) Victor Lai

=== Group A ===
Rank	Players	Pld	W	L	GF	GA	GD	PF	PA	PD	Pts	Qualification
1	(France) Christo Popov											Advance to semi-finals
2												Advance to semi-finals
3												Eliminated
4												Eliminated

Date	Player 1	Score	Player 2	Set 1	Set 2	Set 3
17 Dec						
18 Dec						
19 Dec						

=== Group B ===
Rank	Players	Pld	W	L	GF	GA	GD	PF	PA	PD	Pts	Qualification
1	(Denmark) Anders Antonsen											Advance to semi-finals
2												Advance to semi-finals
3												Eliminated
4												Eliminated

Date	Player 1	Score	Player 2	Set 1	Set 2	Set 3
17 Dec						
18 Dec						
19 Dec						

=== Finals ===
Semi-finals
A1
B2
A2
B1

Final

== Women's singles ==
=== Seeds ===
1. (Japan) Akane Yamaguchi
2. (South Korea) An Se-young
3. (China) Wang Zhiyi
4. (China) Chen Yufei

=== Group A ===
Rank	Players	Pld	W	L	GF	GA	GD	PF	PA	PD	Pts	Qualification
1	(Japan) Akane Yamaguchi											Advance to semi-finals
2												Advance to semi-finals
3												Eliminated
4												Eliminated

Date	Player 1	Score	Player 2	Set 1	Set 2	Set 3
17 Dec						
18 Dec						
19 Dec						

=== Group B ===
Rank	Players	Pld	W	L	GF	GA	GD	PF	PA	PD	Pts	Qualification
1	(South Korea) An Se-young											Advance to semi-finals
2												Advance to semi-finals
3												Eliminated
4												Eliminated

Date	Player 1	Score	Player 2	Set 1	Set 2	Set 3
17 Dec						
18 Dec						
19 Dec						

=== Finals ===
Semi-finals
A1
B2
A2
B1

Final

== Men's doubles ==
=== Seeds ===
1. (Malaysia) Goh Sze Fei / Nur Izzudin
2. (South Korea) Kim Won-ho / Seo Seung-jae
3. (Japan) Takuro Hoki / Yugo Kobayashi
4. (Indonesia) Fajar Alfian / Muhammad Shohibul Fikri

=== Group A ===
Rank	Players	Pld	W	L	GF	GA	GD	PF	PA	PD	Pts	Qualification
1	(Malaysia) Goh Sze Fei (Malaysia) Nur Izzudin											Advance to semi-finals
2												Advance to semi-finals
3												Eliminated
4												Eliminated

Date	Player 1	Score	Player 2	Set 1	Set 2	Set 3
17 Dec						
18 Dec						
19 Dec						

=== Group B ===
Rank	Players	Pld	W	L	GF	GA	GD	PF	PA	PD	Pts	Qualification
1	(South Korea) Kim Won-ho (South Korea) Seo Seung-jae											Advance to semi-finals
2												Advance to semi-finals
3												Eliminated
4												Eliminated

Date	Player 1	Score	Player 2	Set 1	Set 2	Set 3
17 Dec						
18 Dec						
19 Dec						

=== Finals ===
Semi-finals
A1
B2
A2
B1

Final

== Women's doubles ==
=== Seeds ===
1. (Malaysia) Pearly Tan / Thinaah Muralitharan
2. (Japan) Yuki Fukushima / Mayu Matsumoto
3. /
4. /

=== Group A ===
Rank	Players	Pld	W	L	GF	GA	GD	PF	PA	PD	Pts	Qualification
1	(Malaysia) Pearly Tan (Malaysia) Thinaah Muralitharan											Advance to semi-finals
2												Advance to semi-finals
3												Eliminated
4												Eliminated

Date	Player 1	Score	Player 2	Set 1	Set 2	Set 3
17 Dec						
18 Dec						
19 Dec						

=== Group B ===
Rank	Players	Pld	W	L	GF	GA	GD	PF	PA	PD	Pts	Qualification
1	(Japan) Yuki Fukushima (Japan) Mayu Matsumoto											Advance to semi-finals
2												Advance to semi-finals
3												Eliminated
4												Eliminated

Date	Player 1	Score	Player 2	Set 1	Set 2	Set 3
17 Dec						
18 Dec						
19 Dec						

=== Finals ===
Semi-finals
A1
B2
A2
B1

Final

== Mixed doubles ==
=== Seeds ===
1. (China) Feng Yanzhe / Huang Dongping
2. (China) Jiang Zhenbang / Wei Yaxin
3. /
4. /

=== Group A ===
Rank	Players	Pld	W	L	GF	GA	GD	PF	PA	PD	Pts	Qualification
1	(China) Feng Yanzhe (China) Huang Dongping											Advance to semi-finals
2												Advance to semi-finals
3												Eliminated
4												Eliminated

Date	Player 1	Score	Player 2	Set 1	Set 2	Set 3
17 Dec						
18 Dec						
19 Dec						

=== Group B ===
Rank	Players	Pld	W	L	GF	GA	GD	PF	PA	PD	Pts	Qualification
1	(China) Jiang Zhenbang (China) Wei Yaxin											Advance to semi-finals
2												Advance to semi-finals
3												Eliminated
4												Eliminated

Date	Player 1	Score	Player 2	Set 1	Set 2	Set 3
17 Dec						
18 Dec						
19 Dec						

=== Finals ===
Semi-finals
A1
B2
A2
B1

Final

Preceded by 2026 Odisha Masters	BWF World Tour; 2026 BWF season	Succeeded by 2027 Malaysia Open
