= 2027 Women's Softball European Championship =

Tournament details
- Host country: Germany
- Dates: 25–31 July 2027
- Teams: 21
- Defending champions: Italy (2025)
- Last updated on 14 September 2025

The 2027 Women's Softball European Championship is an international European softball competition scheduled to be held in Stuttgart, Germany from 25 to 31 July 2027. It will the 26th edition of the Women's Softball European Championship.

Italy is the defending champion, having beaten the Netherlands at the 2025 edition of the tournament in Prague.
