= FIS Nordic World Ski Championships 2027 =

Ski competition

- Host city: Falun
- Country: Sweden
- Events: 27
- Opening: 24 February 2027
- Closing: 7 March 2027
- Main venue: Lugnet skidstadion
- Website: https://falun2027.com/

The 45th FIS Nordic World Ski Championships will be held from 24 February to 7 March 2027 in Falun, Sweden.

== Medal summary ==
=== Cross-country skiing ===
==== Men ====
Event	Gold	Silver	Bronze
Sprint freestyle			
20 km skiathlon			
10 km classical individual			
Team sprint classical			
4 × 7.5 kilometre relay			
50 kilometre freestyle mass start			

==== Women ====
Event	Gold	Silver	Bronze
Sprint freestyle			
20 km skiathlon			
10 km classical individual			
Team sprint classical			
4 × 7.5 kilometre relay			
50 kilometre freestyle mass start			

=== Nordic combined ===
==== Men ====
Event	Gold	Silver	Bronze
Individual normal hill/7.5 km compact			
Individual large hill/10 km			
Team large hill/2 × 7.5 km			

==== Women ====
Event	Gold	Silver	Bronze
Individual normal hill/5 km			
Individual large hill/5 km compact			
Team normal hill/2 × 4.5 km			

==== Mixed ====
Event	Gold	Silver	Bronze
Mixed team normal hill			

=== Ski jumping ===
==== Men ====
Event	Gold	Silver	Bronze
Men's individual normal hill			
Men's individual large hill			
Men's team large hill			

==== Women ====
Event	Gold	Silver	Bronze
Women's individual normal hill			
Women's individual large hill			
Women's team normal hill			

==== Mixed ====
Event	Gold	Silver	Bronze
Mixed team large hill			
