= Riki Takei =

Japanese badminton player (born 2003)

Personal information
- Native name: 武井 凜生
- Born: 21 July 2003 (age 23) Tokyo, Japan
- Height: 1.64 m (5 ft 5 in)

Sport
- Country: Japan
- Sport: Badminton
- Handedness: Right
- Coached by: Kento Momota (NTT East); Kazumasa Sakai (BAJ)

Men's singles
- Career record: 122 wins, 41 losses (74.85%)
- Highest ranking: 57 (7 July 2026)
- Current ranking: 75 (17 November 2026)
- BWF profile
Medal record
Men's badminton
Representing Japan
World Junior Championships
Bronze medal – third place	2019 Kazan	Mixed team

Riki Takei (武井 凜生, Takei Riki; born 21 July 2003) is a Japanese badminton player who competes in men's singles. A member of the Japanese national team, he plays for the NTT East team and has reached a career-high world ranking of No. 57. He was the 2017 Asian Junior U-15 champion in the boys' singles. He won his first senior international title at the 2023 Thailand International and was a runner-up at the 2024 All Japan Badminton Championships. In 2026, he reached his first BWF World Tour final at the Baoji China Masters.

== Early career ==
Takei began playing badminton at age five at the Ome Junior club in Tokyo. As a fourth-grader, he won a national elementary school championship, leading to his selection for the U-13 National Development squad. He later attended Inawashiro Junior High School and the Futaba Mirai Gakuen High School.

Takei made his international debut in 2015 at the Singapore Youth International Series. He won his first junior international title in 2017 with a victory in the boys' singles at the U-15 Asian Junior Championships. That same year, he won a gold medal in boys' doubles at the Singapore Youth International with partner Shohei Noguchi. In 2018, he earned a silver medal in boys' singles at the Jakarta Open Junior International. The following year, he was part of the Japanese team that won a bronze medal in the mixed team event at the 2019 World Junior Championships in Kazan. His junior career also included numerous domestic titles, including victories at the All Japan Junior High School Championships, the National High School Championships (Inter-High), and the All Japan Junior Championships.

== Career ==
After graduating from high school, Takei joined the NTT East Badminton Team on 1 April 2022. In 2023, he won his first senior international title at the Thailand International by defeating Heo Kwang-hee of South Korea in the final. Later that year, he finished runner-up at the Bahrain International, losing to compatriot Minoru Koga.

In 2024, Takei reached the final of the All Japan Championships, finishing as the runner-up to Yushi Tanaka. His run to the final included wins over Kenta Nishimoto and Riku Hatano, and he advanced from the semifinals after Koki Watanabe withdrew due to injury. Takei attributed his performance to six months of training under former national player Kento Momota.

In 2025, Takei won the Réunion Open without dropping a single game. He also won the Saipan International, defeating Yudai Okimoto in the final. In July, he won the Lin Dan Cup, an invitational tournament in Xi'an, China.

In May 2026, Takei reached his first BWF World Tour final at the Super 100 Baoji China Masters, finishing runner-up to China's Sun Chao. In July, he advanced to his second World Tour final, and his first at the Super 300 level, at the Canada Open. En route, he defeated compatriot Minoru Koga in the second round and Olympic bronze medalist Lee Zii Jia in the semifinals, ultimately finishing as the runner-up after falling to Yudai Okimoto in an all-Japanese final.

== Personal life ==
Takei is the younger brother of badminton player Yuta Takei. He married on 6 June 2024, and his first child, a daughter, was born on 9 December 2024.

== Achievements ==
=== BWF World Tour (2 runners-up) ===
The BWF World Tour, which was announced on 19 March 2017 and implemented in 2018, is a series of elite badminton tournaments sanctioned by the Badminton World Federation (BWF). The BWF World Tour is divided into levels of World Tour Finals, Super 1000, Super 750, Super 500, Super 300, and the BWF Tour Super 100.

Men's singles
Year	Tournament	Level	Opponent	Score	Result	Ref.
2026	Baoji China Masters	Super 100	(China) Sun Chao	12–21, 13–21	(silver) Runner-up	
2026	Canada Open	Super 300	(Japan) Yudai Okimoto	13–21, 3–21	(silver) Runner-up	

=== BWF International Challenge/Series (3 titles, 1 runner-up) ===
Men's singles
Year	Tournament	Opponent	Score	Result	Ref.
2023	Thailand International	(South Korea) Heo Kwang-hee	17–21, 22–20, 21–17	(gold) Winner	
2023	Bahrain International	(Japan) Minoru Koga	21–11, 15–21, 18–21	(silver) Runner-up	
2025	Réunion Open	(India) Rahul Bharadwaj	21–7, 21–5	(gold) Winner	
2025	Saipan International	(Japan) Yudai Okimoto	16–14, 15–4	(gold) Winner	

BWF International Challenge tournament
BWF International Series tournament

== Performance timeline ==
Key

W	Won	F	Finalist	SF	Semi-finalist
QF	Quarter-finalist	#R	Rounds 4, 3, 2, 1	RR	Round-robin stage
Q#	Qualification round	A	Absent	w/d	Withdrew
G	Gold	S	Silver	B	Bronze
NH	Not held	N/A	Not applicable	DNQ	Did not qualify

=== National team ===
Junior level

Team events	2019	Ref
World Junior Championships	B	

=== Individual competitions ===
- Junior level

Events	2019	Ref
World Junior Championships	2R	

- Senior level

Tournament	BWF World Tour			Best	Ref
Tournament	2024	2025	2026	Best	Ref
Swiss Open	A		Q2	Q2 ('26)	
Orléans Masters	A		Q1	Q1 ('26)	
Baoji China Masters	3R	A	F	F ('26)	
Australian Open	A		Q2	Q2 ('26)	
U.S. Open	A		2R	2R ('26)	
Canada Open	A		F	F ('26)	
Taipei Open	A		1R	1R ('26)	
Korea Masters	A	1R	2R	2R ('26)	
Indonesia Masters Super 100	A	QF	A	QF ('25)	
Indonesia Masters Super 100	A	2R	A	QF ('25)	
Malaysia Super 100	A	2R	A	2R ('25)	
Korea Open	A		1R	1R ('26)	
Japan Masters	A	1R	1R	1R ('25, '26)	
Kaohsiung Masters	A	SF	A	SF ('25)	
Year-end ranking	279	69		57	
Tournament	2024	2025	2026	Best	Ref

== Record against selected opponents ==
Record against Year-end Finals finalists, World Championships semi-finalists, and Olympic quarter-finalists. Accurate as of 5 July 2026.

Player	Matches	Win	Lost	Diff.
(Malaysia) Lee Zii Jia	2	1	1	0
(South Korea) Heo Kwang-hee	1	1	0	+1
(South Korea) Son Wan-ho	1	1	0	+1
(Vietnam) Nguyễn Tiến Minh	2	1	1	0
