= 2026 Japan Masters =

Badminton tournament in Japan

Tournament details
- Dates: 10–15 November
- Edition: 4th
- Level: Super 500
- Total prize money: US$500,000
- Venue: Kumamoto Prefectural Gymnasium
- Location: Kumamoto, Japan

Champions
- Men's singles: (India) Lakshya Sen
- Women's singles: (Japan) Akane Yamaguchi
- Men's doubles: (Malaysia) Aaron Tai (Malaysia) Yap Roy King
- Women's doubles: (Japan) Rin Iwanaga (Japan) Kie Nakanishi
- Mixed doubles: (China) Jiang Zhenbang (China) Wei Yaxin

The 2026 Japan Masters (officially known as the Kumamoto Masters Japan 2026 for sponsorship reasons) was a badminton tournament that took place at the Kumamoto Prefectural Gymnasium in Kumamoto, Japan, from 10 to 15 November 2026 and had a total prize of US$500,000.

== Tournament ==
The 2026 Japan Masters was the thirty-first tournament of the 2026 BWF World Tour and also part of the Japan Masters championships, which have been held since 2023. This tournament was organized by the Badminton Association of Japan (formerly known as the Nippon Badminton Association) with sanction from the BWF.

=== Venue ===
This tournament was held at Kumamoto Prefectural Gymnasium in Kumamoto, Japan.

=== Point distribution ===
Below was the point distribution table for each phase of the tournament based on the BWF points system for the BWF World Tour Super 500 event.

| Winner | Runner-up | 3/4 | 5/8 | 9/16 | 17/32 | 33/64 | 65/128 |
|---|---|---|---|---|---|---|---|
| 9,200 | 7,800 | 6,420 | 5,040 | 3,600 | 2,220 | 880 | 430 |

=== Prize pool ===
The total prize money was US$500,000 with the distribution of the prize money in accordance with BWF regulations.

| Event | Winner | Finalist | Semi-finals | Quarter-finals | Last 16 |
| Singles | $37,500 | $19,000 | $7,250 | $3,000 | $1,750 |
| Doubles | $39,500 | $19,000 | $7,000 | $3,625 | $1,875 |

== Men's singles ==
=== Seeds ===
1. (France) Christo Popov (second round)
2. (Thailand) Kunlavut Vitidsarn (semi-finals)
3. (Chinese Taipei) Chou Tien-chen (second round)
4. (Canada) Victor Lai (second round)
5. (Japan) Kodai Naraoka (second round)
6. (Indonesia) Alwi Farhan (semi-finals)
7. (France) Toma Junior Popov (quarter-finals)
8. (India) Lakshya Sen (champion)

=== Finals ===
Semi-finals
6 | (Indonesia) Alwi Farhan | 12 | 21 | 11
8 | (India) Lakshya Sen | 21 | 15 | 21
(Japan) Koki Watanabe | 14 | 21 | 23
2 | (Thailand) Kunlavut Vitidsarn | 21 | 11 | 21

Final
8 | (India) Lakshya Sen | 13 | 21 | 21
(Japan) Koki Watanabe | 21 | 18 | 14

=== Top half ===
==== Section 1 ====
First round
1 | (France) C Popov | 21 | 21
Q4 | (Japan) M Koga | 14 | 14
(Indonesia) Z Ubaidillah | 22 | 28 | 21
(Canada) B Yang | 24 | 26 | 19
6 | (Indonesia) A Farhan | 21 | 21
(Chinese Taipei) Lin C-y | 18 | 12
(Republic of Ireland) N Nguyen | 21 | 7 | 18
(Japan) K Nishimoto | 15 | 21 | 21

Second round
1 | (France) C Popov | 15 | 19
(Indonesia) Z Ubaidillah | 21 | 21
6 | (Indonesia) A Farhan | 21 | 6 | 21
(Japan) K Nishimoto | 13 | 21 | 11

Quarter-finals
(Indonesia) Z Ubaidillah | 17 | 12
6 | (Indonesia) A Farhan | 21 | 21

==== Section 2 ====
First round
4 | (Canada) V Lai | 21 | 21
(Japan) Y Okimoto | 19 | 12
(Japan) Y Tanaka | 21 | 21
(China) Zhu XC | 14 | 17
8 | (India) L Sen | 21 | 21
(Chinese Taipei) Chi Y-j | 19 | 18
(China) Dong TY | 21 | 19 | 21
(Chinese Taipei) Lee C-h | 15 | 21 | 10

Second round
4 | (Canada) V Lai | 16 | 19
(Japan) Y Tanaka | 21 | 21
8 | (India) L Sen | 21 | 21
(China) Dong TY | 8 | 14

Quarter-finals
(Japan) Y Tanaka | 16 | 15
8 | (India) L Sen | 21 | 21

=== Bottom half ===
==== Section 3 ====
First round
(India) S Kidambi | 18 | 21 | 24
(Denmark) R Gemke | 21 | 16 | 22
(Thailand) Pan Teeraratsakul | 21 | 17 | 17
5 | (Japan) K Naraoka | 17 | 21 | 21
(Japan) K Watanabe | 21 | 21
Q3 | (South Korea) Jeon H-j | 10 | 18
(China) Hu ZA | 17 | 18
3 | (Chinese Taipei) Chou T-c | 21 | 21

Second round
(India) S Kidambi | 21 | 11 | 21
5 | (Japan) K Naraoka | 15 | 21 | 18
(Japan) K Watanabe | 24 | 21
3 | (Chinese Taipei) Chou T-c | 22 | 19

Quarter-finals
(India) S Kidambi | 22 | 15
(Japan) K Watanabe | 24 | 21

==== Section 4 ====
First round
(Chinese Taipei) Wang P-w | 21 | 21
(Chinese Taipei) Wang T-w | 11 | 12
(Chinese Taipei) Su L-y | 15 | 11
7 | (France) T J Popov | 21 | 21
Q1 | (South Korea) Yoo T-b | 21 | 16 | 21
Q2 | (Japan) R Takei | 13 | 21 | 18
(Denmark) M Johannesen | 18 | 19
2 | (Thailand) K Vitidsarn | 21 | 21

Second round
(Chinese Taipei) Wang P-w | 9 | 18
7 | (France) T J Popov | 21 | 21
Q1 | (South Korea) Yoo T-b | 19 | 14
2 | (Thailand) K Vitidsarn | 21 | 21

Quarter-finals
7 | (France) T J Popov | 18 | 7
2 | (Thailand) K Vitidsarn | 21 | 21

== Women's singles ==
=== Seeds ===
1. (Japan) Akane Yamaguchi (champion)
2. (China) Wang Zhiyi (final)
3. (China) Chen Yufei (semi-finals)
4. (Thailand) Ratchanok Intanon (second round)
5. (Japan) Tomoka Miyazaki (semi-finals)
6. (Thailand) Pornpawee Chochuwong (quarter-finals)
7. (Indonesia) Putri Kusuma Wardani (first round)
8. (Japan) Nozomi Okuhara (quarter-finals)

=== Finals ===
Semi-finals
1 | (Japan) Akane Yamaguchi | 18 | 21 | 11
3 | (China) Chen Yufei | 21 | 8 | 4^{r}
5 | (Japan) Tomoka Miyazaki | 10 | 15
2 | (China) Wang Zhiyi | 21 | 21

Final
1 | (Japan) Akane Yamaguchi | 21 | 22
2 | (China) Wang Zhiyi | 14 | 20

=== Top half ===
==== Section 1 ====
First round
1 | (Japan) A Yamaguchi | 22 | 21
(Japan) H Akechi | 20 | 10
(Thailand) S Katethong | 21 | 21
(Chinese Taipei) Huang Y-h | 19 | 7
7 | (Indonesia) P K Wardani | 13 | 20
(Japan) R Gunji | 21 | 22
(China) Han QX | 21 | 10 | 11
(Chinese Taipei) Tung C-t | 19 | 21 | 21

Second round
1 | (Japan) A Yamaguchi | 18 | 21 | 21
(Thailand) S Katethong | 21 | 11 | 13
(Japan) R Gunji | 18 | 21 | 21
(Chinese Taipei) Tung C-t | 21 | 16 | 16

Quarter-finals
1 | (Japan) A Yamaguchi | 21 | 21
(Japan) R Gunji | 13 | 12

==== Section 2 ====
First round
3 | (China) Chen YF | 22 | 21
Q4 | (Japan) K Sugiyama | 20 | 17
(Bulgaria) K Nalbantova | 22 | 21
(Canada) M Li | 20 | 16
6 | (Thailand) P Chochuwong | 17 | 21 | 21
(Malaysia) Wong L C | 21 | 4 | 13
(Malaysia) Letshanaa K | 18 | 21 | 12
(Japan) N Nidaira | 21 | 18 | 21

Second round
3 | (China) Chen YF | 21 | 19 | 22
(Bulgaria) K Nalbantova | 17 | 21 | 20
6 | (Thailand) P Chochuwong | 21 | 21
(Japan) N Nidaira | 10 | 14

Quarter-finals
3 | (China) Chen YF | 18 | 21 | 21
6 | (Thailand) P Chochuwong | 21 | 17 | 11

=== Bottom half ===
==== Section 3 ====
First round
(Denmark) L Kjærsfeldt | 21 | 21
Q3 | (Ukraine) Y Kantemyr | 16 | 16
PFQ | (Japan) M Suizu | 18 | 11
5 | (Japan) T Miyazaki | 21 | 21
(Chinese Taipei) Lin H-t | 21 | 15 | 21
(Chinese Taipei) Chiu P-c | 19 | 21 | 16
Q2 | (Japan) N Sunakawa | 13 | 21 | 11
4 | (Thailand) R Intanon | 21 | 13 | 21

Second round
(Denmark) L Kjærsfeldt | 16 | 21 | 10
5 | (Japan) T Miyazaki | 21 | 12 | 21
(Chinese Taipei) Lin H-t | 21 | 21
4 | (Thailand) R Intanon | 15 | 19

Quarter-finals
5 | (Japan) T Miyazaki | 21 | 21
(Chinese Taipei) Lin H-t | 14 | 12

==== Section 4 ====
First round
(Chinese Taipei) Sung S-y | 21 | 21
(Denmark) A Schulz | 19 | 17
(Ukraine) P Buhrova | 15 | 16
8 | (Japan) N Okuhara | 21 | 21
(Denmark) M Blichfeldt | 21 | 13 | 21
Q1 | (China) Xu WJ | 14 | 21 | 13
(Canada) R Chan | 13 | 20
2 | (China) Wang ZY | 21 | 22

Second round
(Chinese Taipei) Sung S-y | 19 | 10
8 | (Japan) N Okuhara | 21 | 21
(Denmark) M Blichfeldt | 22 | 16
2 | (China) Wang ZY | 24 | 21

Quarter-finals
8 | (Japan) N Okuhara | 17 | 21 | 8
2 | (China) Wang ZY | 21 | 19 | 21

== Men's doubles ==
=== Seeds ===
1. (South Korea) Kim Won-ho / Seo Seung-jae (second round)
2. (Indonesia) Fajar Alfian / Muhammad Shohibul Fikri (first round)
3. (Malaysia) Aaron Chia / Soh Wooi Yik (first round)
4. (Malaysia) Goh Sze Fei / Nur Izzuddin (second round)
5. (India) Satwiksairaj Rankireddy / Chirag Shetty (withdrew)
6. (Indonesia) Sabar Karyaman Gutama / Muhammad Reza Pahlevi Isfahani (first round)
7. (England) Ben Lane / Sean Vendy (quarter-finals)
8. (Malaysia) Man Wei Chong / Tee Kai Wun (second round)

=== Finals ===
Semi-finals
(China) Wang Chang (China) Xie Haonan | 15 | 21 | 17
(Japan) Takuro Hoki (Japan) Yugo Kobayashi | 21 | 19 | 21
(Malaysia) Aaron Tai (Malaysia) Yap Roy King | 21 | 21
(Denmark) Daniel Lundgaard (Denmark) Mads Vestergaard | 18 | 18

Final
(Japan) Takuro Hoki (Japan) Yugo Kobayashi | 21 | 13 | 15
(Malaysia) Aaron Tai (Malaysia) Yap Roy King | 16 | 21 | 21

=== Top half ===
==== Section 1 ====
First round
1 | (South Korea) Kim W-h (South Korea) Seo S-j | 21 | 21
(France) C Popov (France) T J Popov | 11 | 17
PFQ | (South Korea) Kang M-h (South Korea) Lee J-m | 20 | 11
(South Korea) Jin Y (South Korea) Jo S-h | 22 | 21
SWM | (China) Chen BY (China) Liu Y | 16 | 12
(China) Wang C (China) Xie HN | 21 | 21
(China) He JT (China) Ren XY | 19 | 21 | 21
Q2 | (Malaysia) Chia W J (Malaysia) Teo E Y | 21 | 14 | 10

Second round
1 | (South Korea) Kim W-h (South Korea) Seo S-j | 19 | 15
(South Korea) Jin Y (South Korea) Jo S-h | 21 | 21
(China) Wang C (China) Xie HN | 18 | 21 | 21
(China) He JT (China) Ren XY | 21 | 18 | 13

Quarter-finals
(South Korea) Jin Y (South Korea) Jo S-h | 18 | 16
(China) Wang C (China) Xie HN | 21 | 21

==== Section 2 ====
First round
3 | (Malaysia) A Chia (Malaysia) Soh W Y | 6^{r}
(India) H Amsakarunan (India) Arjun M. R. | 11
Q1 | (Hong Kong) Hung K C (Hong Kong) Lui C W | 13 | 17
(Japan) T Hoki (Japan) Y Kobayashi | 21 | 21
7 | (England) B Lane (England) S Vendy | 21 | 21
(Chinese Taipei) Lee F-c (Chinese Taipei) Lee F-j | 18 | 18
(United States) Chen Z-y (United States) P Smith | 22 | 21
Q3 | (Japan) H Kawabe (Japan) K Matsukawa | 20 | 19

Second round
(India) H Amsakarunan (India) Arjun M. R. | 14 | 14
(Japan) T Hoki (Japan) Y Kobayashi | 21 | 21
7 | (England) B Lane (England) S Vendy | 21 | 21
(United States) Chen Z-y (United States) P Smith | 18 | 15

Quarter-finals
(Japan) T Hoki (Japan) Y Kobayashi | 18 | 21 | 21
7 | (England) B Lane (England) S Vendy | 21 | 12 | 15

=== Bottom half ===
==== Section 3 ====
First round
(Chinese Taipei) Lee J-h (Chinese Taipei) Yang P-h | 21 | 21
(Japan) T Nomura (Japan) Y Shimogami | 17 | 15
(China) Hu KY (China) Liang WK | 23 | 21
6 | (Indonesia) S K Gutama (Indonesia) M R P Isfahani | 21 | 16
(Malaysia) A Tai (Malaysia) Yap R K | 21 | 21
(Japan) K Kumagai (Japan) H Nishi | 8 | 14
PFQ | (Denmark) C F Kjær (Denmark) R Kjær | 15 | 16
4 | (Malaysia) Goh S F (Malaysia) N Izzuddin | 21 | 21

Second round
(Chinese Taipei) Lee J-h (Chinese Taipei) Yang P-h | 21 | 21
(China) Hu KY (China) Liang WK | 14 | 16
(Malaysia) A Tai (Malaysia) Yap R K | 21 | 21
4 | (Malaysia) Goh S F (Malaysia) N Izzuddin | 14 | 15

Quarter-finals
(Chinese Taipei) Lee J-h (Chinese Taipei) Yang P-h | 16 | 12
(Malaysia) A Tai (Malaysia) Yap R K | 21 | 21

==== Section 4 ====
First round
(Denmark) D Lundgaard (Denmark) M Vestergaard | 21 | 16 | 22
(Malaysia) N M Azriyn A (Malaysia) Tan W K | 16 | 21 | 20
Q4 | (Thailand) P Sukphun (Thailand) Pak Teeraratsakul | 18 | 23 | 13
8 | (Malaysia) Man W C (Malaysia) Tee K W | 21 | 21 | 21
(Chinese Taipei) Chiu H-c (Chinese Taipei) Wang C-l | 14 | 21 | 21
(Chinese Taipei) Chen Z-r (Chinese Taipei) Lin Y-c | 21 | 11 | 15
(Japan) H Okamura (Japan) K Yamashita | 21 | 11 | 29
2 | (Indonesia) F Alfian (Indonesia) M S Fikri | 14 | 21 | 27

Second round
(Denmark) D Lundgaard (Denmark) M Vestergaard | 21 | 21
8 | (Malaysia) Man W C (Malaysia) Tee K W | 15 | 18
(Chinese Taipei) Chiu H-c (Chinese Taipei) Wang C-l | 21 | 19 | 9
(Japan) H Okamura (Japan) K Yamashita | 19 | 21 | 21

Quarter-finals
(Denmark) D Lundgaard (Denmark) M Vestergaard | 21 | 21
(Japan) H Okamura (Japan) K Yamashita | 14 | 14

== Women's doubles ==
=== Seeds ===
1. (Japan) Yuki Fukushima / Mayu Matsumoto (second round)
2. (Malaysia) Pearly Tan / Thinaah Muralitharan (first round)
3. (Japan) Rin Iwanaga / Kie Nakanishi (champions)
4. (Indonesia) Rachel Allessya Rose / Febi Setianingrum (withdrew)
5. (Chinese Taipei) Hsu Yin-hui / Lin Jhih-yun (semi-finals)
6. (Indonesia) Amallia Cahaya Pratiwi / Siti Fadia Silva Ramadhanti (quarter-finals)
7. (Bulgaria) Gabriela Stoeva / Stefani Stoeva (first round)
8. (Indonesia) Febriana Dwipuji Kusuma / Meilysa Trias Puspita Sari (quarter-finals)

=== Finals ===
Semi-finals
(South Korea) Kim Hye-jeong (South Korea) Lee Yeon-woo | 13 | 19
3 | (Japan) Rin Iwanaga (Japan) Kie Nakanishi | 21 | 21
5 | (Chinese Taipei) Hsu Yin-hui (Chinese Taipei) Lin Jhih-yun | 21 | 15
(Japan) Ririna Hiramoto (Japan) Chiharu Shida | 23 | 21

Final
3 | (Japan) Rin Iwanaga (Japan) Kie Nakanishi | 21 | 21
(Japan) Ririna Hiramoto (Japan) Chiharu Shida | 19 | 15

=== Top half ===
==== Section 1 ====
First round
1 | (Japan) Y Fukushima (Japan) M Matsumoto | 14 | 21 | 23
(China) Li YJ (China) Wang YD | 21 | 9 | 21
(South Korea) Kim H-j (South Korea) Lee Y-w | 21 | 21
(Canada) J Dent (Canada) C Lai | 10 | 8
7 | (Bulgaria) G Stoeva (Bulgaria) S Stoeva | 21 | 13 | 5
(South Korea) Kim Y-j (South Korea) Lee Y-l | 17 | 21 | 21
(Hong Kong) Lui L L (Hong Kong) Tsang H Y | 12 | 17
(Chinese Taipei) Lin C-c (Chinese Taipei) Yang C-y | 21 | 21

Second round
1 | (Japan) Y Fukushima (Japan) M Matsumoto | 19 | 18
(South Korea) Kim H-j (South Korea) Lee Y-w | 21 | 21
(South Korea) Kim Y-j (South Korea) Lee Y-l | 21 | 21
(Chinese Taipei) Lin C-c (Chinese Taipei) Yang C-y | 14 | 15

Quarter-finals
(South Korea) Kim H-j (South Korea) Lee Y-w | 21 | 21
(South Korea) Kim Y-j (South Korea) Lee Y-l | 14 | 14

==== Section 2 ====
First round
3 | (Japan) R Iwanaga (Japan) K Nakanishi | 21 | 21
(United States) F Corbett (United States) J Gai | 18 | 16
(Japan) H Suzuki (Japan) N Yamakita | 17 | 14
(India) T Jolly (India) G Gopichand | 21 | 21
8 | (Indonesia) F D Kusuma (Indonesia) M T Puspita Sari | 21 | 21
(Chinese Taipei) Chang C-h (Chinese Taipei) Yang C-t | 17 | 15
Q4 | (Japan) M Konegawa (Japan) A Uesugi | 18 | 21 | 21
(Hong Kong) Yeung N T (Hong Kong) Yeung P L | 21 | 15 | 10

Second round
3 | (Japan) R Iwanaga (Japan) K Nakanishi | 21 | 21
(India) T Jolly (India) G Gopichand | 14 | 14
8 | (Indonesia) F D Kusuma (Indonesia) M T Puspita Sari | 21 | 21
Q4 | (Japan) M Konegawa (Japan) A Uesugi | 17 | 11

Quarter-finals
3 | (Japan) R Iwanaga (Japan) K Nakanishi | 21 | 21
8 | (Indonesia) F D Kusuma (Indonesia) M T Puspita Sari | 18 | 18

=== Bottom half ===
==== Section 3 ====
First round
(Chinese Taipei) Hsu Y-c (Chinese Taipei) Sung Y-h | 14 | 15
(China) Luo Y (China) Wang TG | 21 | 21
Q1 | (China) Chen FST (China) Luo XM | 15 | 21 | 18
SWM | (Japan) S Nakade (Japan) M Takahashi | 21 | 19 | 21
(Japan) M Kanehiro (Japan) Y Kato | 21 | 21
Q2 | (Japan) K Ishikawa (Japan) H Konishi | 17 | 12
(China) Bao LJ (China) Cao ZH | 13 | 13
5 | (Chinese Taipei) Hsu Y-h (Chinese Taipei) Lin J-y | 21 | 21

Second round
(China) Luo Y (China) Wang TG | 21 | 21
(Japan) S Nakade (Japan) M Takahashi | 16 | 12
(Japan) M Kanehiro (Japan) Y Kato | 17 | 8
5 | (Chinese Taipei) Hsu Y-h (Chinese Taipei) Lin J-y | 21 | 21

Quarter-finals
(China) Luo Y (China) Wang TG | 19 | 12
5 | (Chinese Taipei) Hsu Y-h (Chinese Taipei) Lin J-y | 21 | 21

==== Section 4 ====
First round
(Japan) S Hirota (Japan) A Sakuramoto | 21 | 21
(Ukraine) P Buhrova (Ukraine) Y Kantemyr | 16 | 18
(Japan) R Hirokami (Japan) S Hobara | 14 | 13
6 | (Indonesia) A C Pratiwi (Indonesia) S F S Ramadhanti | 21 | 21
Q3 | (Thailand) O Jongsathapornparn (Thailand) S S Wedler | 21 | 13
(United States) L Lam (United States) A Lee | 23 | 21
(Japan) R Hiramoto (Japan) C Shida | 18 | 21 | 21
2 | (Malaysia) P Tan (Malaysia) Thinaah M | 21 | 13 | 14

Second round
(Japan) S Hirota (Japan) A Sakuramoto | 22 | 19 | 15
6 | (Indonesia) A C Pratiwi (Indonesia) S F S Ramadhanti | 20 | 21 | 21
(United States) L Lam (United States) A Lee | 10 | 12
(Japan) R Hiramoto (Japan) C Shida | 21 | 21

Quarter-finals
6 | (Indonesia) A C Pratiwi (Indonesia) S F S Ramadhanti | 19 | 17
(Japan) R Hiramoto (Japan) C Shida | 21 | 21

== Mixed doubles ==
=== Seeds ===
1. (China) Jiang Zhenbang / Wei Yaxin (champions)
2. (Thailand) Dechapol Puavaranukroh / Supissara Paewsampran (second round)
3. (China) Guo Xinwa / Chen Fanghui (second round)
4. (Chinese Taipei) Ye Hong-wei / Nicole Gonzales Chan (quarter-finals)
5. (China) Cheng Xing / Zhang Chi (quarter-finals)
6. (Indonesia) Amri Syahnawi / Nita Violina Marwah (second round)
7. (Chinese Taipei) Yang Po-hsuan / Hu Ling-fang (first round)
8. (Malaysia) Goh Soon Huat / Shevon Jemie Lai (first round)

=== Finals ===
Semi-finals
1 | (China) Jiang Zhenbang (China) Wei Yaxin | 21 | 21
(Japan) Yuta Watanabe (Japan) Maya Taguchi | 9 | 17
(China) Gao Jiaxuan (China) Wu Mengying | 19 | 21 | 21
(Japan) Akira Koga (Japan) Natsu Saito | 21 | 7 | 18

Final
1 | (China) Jiang Zhenbang (China) Wei Yaxin | 15 | 21 | 21
(China) Gao Jiaxuan (China) Wu Mengying | 21 | 15 | 14

=== Top half ===
==== Section 1 ====
First round
1 | (China) Jiang ZB (China) Wei YX | 21 | 21
(India) H Amsakarunan (India) T Crasto | 7 | 9
Q2 | (Canada) J Lai (Canada) C Lai | 14 | 14
(Malaysia) Hoo P R (Malaysia) Lai P J | 21 | 21
5 | (China) Cheng X (China) Zhang C | 22 | 21
Q4 | (United States) Chen Z-y (United States) F Corbett | 20 | 13
(South Korea) Kim J-h (South Korea) Jang H-j | 21 | 25
(United States) P Smith (United States) J Gai | 17 | 23

Second round
1 | (China) Jiang ZB (China) Wei YX | 21 | 21
(Malaysia) Hoo P R (Malaysia) Lai P J | 12 | 19
5 | (China) Cheng X (China) Zhang C | 21 | 21
(South Korea) Kim J-h (South Korea) Jang H-j | 15 | 14

Quarter-finals
1 | (China) Jiang ZB (China) Wei YX | 21 | 21
5 | (China) Cheng X (China) Zhang C | 19 | 16

==== Section 2 ====
First round
4 | (Chinese Taipei) Ye H-w (Chinese Taipei) N G Chan | 16 | 21 | 21
(India) D Rawat (India) K. Maneesha | 21 | 14 | 14
(Thailand) Pak Teeraratsakul (Thailand) S Taerattanachai | 21 | 16
(Chinese Taipei) Liu K-h (Chinese Taipei) Hsu Y-h | 23 | 21
6 | (Indonesia) A Syahnawi (Indonesia) N V Marwah | 21 | 21
(Spain) R García (Spain) L Rodríguez | 14 | 5
(Indonesia) M Faza (Indonesia) A Pranata | 16 | 10
(Japan) Y Watanabe (Japan) M Taguchi | 21 | 21

Second round
4 | (Chinese Taipei) Ye H-w (Chinese Taipei) N G Chan | 21 | 12 | 21
(Chinese Taipei) Liu K-h (Chinese Taipei) Hsu Y-h | 17 | 21 | 18
6 | (Indonesia) A Syahnawi (Indonesia) N V Marwah | 17 | 21 | 8
(Japan) Y Watanabe (Japan) M Taguchi | 21 | 11 | 21

Quarter-finals
4 | (Chinese Taipei) Ye H-w (Chinese Taipei) N G Chan | 18 | 14
(Japan) Y Watanabe (Japan) M Taguchi | 21 | 21

=== Bottom half ===
==== Section 3 ====
First round
(Japan) Y Shimogami (Japan) S Hobara | 21 | 21
(Malaysia) Chen T J (Malaysia) Chan W T | 15 | 10
(China) Zhu YJ (China) Li Q | 21 | 21 | 23
8 | (Malaysia) Goh S H (Malaysia) S J Lai | 19 | 23 | 21
(China) Gao JX (China) Wu MY | 22 | 21
(Indonesia) D Ferdinansyah (Indonesia) F Pasaribu | 20 | 14
(Malaysia) J Wong (Malaysia) Cheng S Y | 8 | 21
3 | (China) Guo XW (China) Chen FH | 21 | 23

Second round
(Japan) Y Shimogami (Japan) S Hobara
(China) Zhu YJ (China) Li Q | w | / | o
(China) Gao JX (China) Wu MY | 14 | 21 | 21
3 | (China) Guo XW (China) Chen FH | 21 | 16 | 19

Quarter-finals
(China) Zhu YJ (China) Li Q | 21 | 12
(China) Gao JX (China) Wu MY | 23 | 21

==== Section 4 ====
First round
Q1 | (Chinese Taipei) Wu H-y (Chinese Taipei) Yang C-y | 21 | 21 | 21
(Japan) H Midorikawa (Japan) M Yamakita | 19 | 23 | 18
(Japan) H Kawabe (Japan) K Ishikawa | 15 | 21 | 21
7 | (Chinese Taipei) Yang P-h (Chinese Taipei) Hu L-f | 21 | 14 | 19
(Japan) A Koga (Japan) N Saito | 21 | 21
(Hong Kong) Chan Y C (Hong Kong) Ng T Y | 19 | 14
Q3 | (Hong Kong) J Yu (Hong Kong) Tse Y S | 15 | 17
2 | (Thailand) D Puavaranukroh (Thailand) S Paewsampran | 21 | 21

Second round
Q1 | (Chinese Taipei) Wu H-y (Chinese Taipei) Yang C-y | 18 | 22 | 21
(Japan) H Kawabe (Japan) K Ishikawa | 21 | 20 | 18
(Japan) A Koga (Japan) N Saito | 21 | 21
2 | (Thailand) D Puavaranukroh (Thailand) S Paewsampran | 15 | 7

Quarter-finals
Q1 | (Chinese Taipei) Wu H-y (Chinese Taipei) Yang C-y | 15 | 21 | 16
(Japan) A Koga (Japan) N Saito | 21 | 19 | 21

| Preceded by 2026 Korea Open | BWF World Tour; 2026 BWF season | Succeeded by 2026 Hong Kong Open |
