= Minoru Koga =

Japanese badminton player (born 1996)

Personal information
- Born: 30 September 1996 (age 30) Fukuoka, Japan
- Height: 1.66 m (5 ft 5 in)
- Weight: 63 kg (139 lb)

Sport
- Country: Japan
- Sport: Badminton
- Handedness: Left

Men's singles
- Highest ranking: 48 (3 November 2026)
- Current ranking: 48 (3 November 2026)
- BWF profile
Medal record
Men's badminton
Representing Japan
Asia Mixed Team Championships
Silver medal – second place	2019 Hong Kong	Mixed team
World Junior Championships
Bronze medal – third place	2014 Alor Setar	Mixed team
Asian Youth Games
Gold medal – first place	2013 Nanjing	Mixed doubles
Asian Junior Championships
Bronze medal – third place	2014 Taipei	Mixed team

Minoru Koga (古賀 穂, Koga Minoru; born 30 September 1996) is a Japanese badminton player who competes in singles. He is a former member of the Japanese national team (2018–2022) and is currently affiliated with the AC Nagano Parceiro Badminton Club. His junior international achievements include a gold medal in mixed doubles at the 2013 Asian Youth Games and bronze medals with the national team at the 2014 Asian and World Junior Championships. While studying at Waseda University, he won the men's singles title at the All Japan Intercollegiate Championships in 2017 and 2018. On the BWF World Tour, his best result was a runner-up finish at the 2018 Canada Open.

== Early life and career ==
Born in Fukuoka, Japan, Koga began playing badminton at the age of six at the Okagaki Junior club. During his childhood, he faced health challenges, including asthma, pneumonia, and severe food allergies. With dietary management supported by his parents, he developed a tactical playing style to compensate for his smaller stature. In 2011, while a second-year student at Tomioka Daiichi Junior High School in Fukushima Prefecture, he was practicing when the ceiling lights fell due to the Great East Japan Earthquake. He temporarily evacuated to his hometown in Fukuoka, but the local community prepared a new practice environment for him in Inawashiro just two months later. Deeply motivated to bring hope to the disaster-stricken region, he went on to sweep five titles at the national junior high school championships.

=== Junior career ===
Koga won national singles titles across all three major junior age divisions: the All Japan Elementary School Championships (2008), the All Japan Junior High School Championships (2011), and the National High School Championships (Inter-High) (2014). At the 2014 Inter-High, he defeated Kanta Tsuneyama in the singles final and led Tomioka High School to the team title. Internationally, Koga partnered with Akane Yamaguchi to win the mixed doubles gold medal at the 2013 Asian Youth Games. He was also a member of the Japanese team that won bronze medals at both the 2014 Asian and World Junior Championships.

=== Collegiate career ===
In 2015, Koga enrolled at Waseda University to study sport sciences. He won back-to-back men's singles titles at the All Japan Intercollegiate Championships in 2017 and 2018. In his final year, he captained the Waseda team to a national intercollegiate team title.

== Career ==
=== 2018–2021: First international title ===
In 2018, while still a university student, Koga was selected for the Japanese national B team for the first time. That same year, he reached the final of the Super 100 Canada Open. Entering the tournament ranked 396th in the world, he finished as the runner-up to Lu Guangzu. In March 2019, he was part of the squad that won silver at 2019 Asia Mixed Team Championships. Following his graduation, Koga joined the NTT East badminton team on 1 April 2019. He won his first senior international title at the 2019 Swedish Open, defeating Loh Kean Yew in the final. Later that year, he reached the semi-finals of the 2019 Vietnam Open, defeating Kunlavut Vitidsarn during his tournament run. However, his international career was temporarily suspended when overseas expeditions were halted for about two years due to the COVID-19 pandemic. Domestically, Koga won the All Japan Members Championships in 2019 and the Japan Ranking Circuit in 2021.

=== 2022–2024: Five international titles and world top 60 ===
In 2022, Koga resumed international competition, winning the Mexican International in April. After reaching only the quarter-finals of the All Japan Championships at the end of the year, he was dropped from the Japanese national team.

Despite his removal from the national team, Koga won Thailand International in March 2023 reaching a career-high world ranking of No. 56. He subsequently claimed titles at the Bahrain International, and Malaysia International titles. After competing in seven tournaments throughout 2023, he finished the year with a world ranking of No. 118. Domestically, he secured his second titles at both the All Japan Members Championships and the Japan Ranking Circuit in 2023.

In 2024, competing as a non-national team player, Koga participated in only three tournaments, successfully defending his Malaysia International title. Due to his limited participations, his world ranking dropped to No. 198 by the end of the year.

=== 2025: Club transfer and two titles ===
Having missed national team selection for three consecutive years, he lacked opportunities to compete overseas, and his world ranking fell to No. 265 by March. He briefly considered retirement, but later decided to self-fund his career with the aim of qualifying for the 2028 Los Angeles Olympics. On 1 April 2025, he left his corporate position at NTT East to become a professional player affiliated with the AC Nagano Parceiro badminton club. This transition allowed him to independently acquire sponsors to cover his international travel and tournament fees. This professional shift led to a resurgence in his international performance; he won titles at the Slovenia Future Series and the Belgian International, and finished as runner-up at the Lagos International. Koga concluded the season by reaching the semi-finals of the Syed Modi International, where he defeated top seed Jason Teh in the quarter-finals before retiring from his semi-final match due to injury . By the end of 2025, his world ranking had improved from No. 284 in August to No. 86.

=== 2026 ===
Koga began 2026 by winning consecutive titles at the Estonian International and the Swedish Open, defeating Denmark's Mads Christophersen in both finals. Later that year, at the German Open, he advanced from the qualifying rounds to the quarter-finals. He defeated the second seed and world No. 6, Li Shifeng, in the first round, and Lee Cheuk Yiu in the second round, before losing to Toma Junior Popov in the quarter-finals. In May, Koga reached the semi-finals of the Baoji China Masters, where he lost to his compatriot Riki Takei. He achieved a new career-high ranking of world No. 48 in November.

== Personal life ==
His elder brother, Akira Koga, is also a badminton player affiliated with JTEKT Stingers.

== Achievements ==
=== Asian Youth Games ===
Mixed doubles
Year	Venue	Partner	Opponent	Score	Result	Ref.
2013	Nanjing Sport Institute; Nanjing, China	(Japan) Akane Yamaguchi	(Thailand) Dechapol Puavaranukroh (Thailand) Puttita Supajirakul	21–19, 19–21, 21–17	Gold	

=== BWF World Tour (1 runner-up) ===
The BWF World Tour, which was announced on 19 March 2017 and implemented in 2018, is a series of elite badminton tournaments sanctioned by the Badminton World Federation (BWF). The BWF World Tours are divided into levels of World Tour Finals, Super 1000, Super 750, Super 500, Super 300 (part of the HSBC World Tour), and the BWF Tour Super 100.

Men's singles
Year	Tournament	Level	Opponent	Score	Result	Ref.
2018	Canada Open	Super 100	(China) Lu Guangzu	15–21, 10–21	(silver) Runner-up	

=== BWF International Challenge/Series (10 titles, 3 runners-up) ===
Men's singles
Year	Tournament	Opponent	Score	Result	Ref.
2019	Slovenian International	(India) Sourabh Verma	17–21, 12–21	(silver) Runner-up	
2019	Lao International	(Japan) Kodai Naraoka	20–22, 20–22	(silver) Runner-up	
2019	Swedish Open	(Singapore) Loh Kean Yew	21–11, 21–15	(gold) Winner	
2022	Mexican International	(Brazil) Jonathan Matias	10–21, 22–20, 21–13	(gold) Winner	
2023	Thailand International	(Chinese Taipei) Chi Yu-jen	15–21, 21–17, 22–20	(gold) Winner	
2023	Malaysia International	(Japan) Takuma Kawamoto	21–17, 10–21, 21–11	(gold) Winner	
2023	Bahrain International	(Japan) Riki Takei	11–21, 21–15, 21–18	(gold) Winner	
2024	Malaysia International	(Japan) Riku Hatano	21–19, 15–21, 21–11	(gold) Winner	
2025	Lagos International	(Indonesia) Prahdiska Bagas Shujiwo	17–21, 18–21	(silver) Runner-up	
2025	Slovenia Future Series	(England) Cholan Kayan	21–17, 24–22	(gold) Winner	
2025	Belgian International	(Belgium) Julien Carraggi	21–14, 22–20	(gold) Winner	
2026	Estonian International	(Denmark) Mads Christophersen	21–18, 11–21, 21–12	(gold) Winner	
2026	Swedish Open	(Denmark) Mads Christophersen	21–16, 16–21, 21–18	(gold) Winner	

BWF International Challenge tournament
BWF International Series tournament
BWF Future Series tournament

== Performance timeline ==
Key

W	Won	F	Finalist	SF	Semi-finalist
QF	Quarter-finalist	#R	Rounds 4, 3, 2, 1	RR	Round-robin stage
Q#	Qualification round	A	Absent	w/d	Withdrew
G	Gold	S	Silver	B	Bronze
NH	Not held	N/A	Not applicable	DNQ	Did not qualify

=== National team ===
- Junior level

Team events	2014	Ref
Asian Junior Championships	B	
World Junior Championships	B	

- Senior level

Team events	2019	Ref
Asia Mixed Team Championships	S	

=== Individual competitions ===
==== Junior level ====
- Boys' singles

Events	2014	Ref
Asian Junior Championships	2R	
World Junior Championships	2R	

- Mixed doubles

Events	2013	Ref
Asian Youth Games	G	

==== Senior level ====
Men's singles

Tournament	BWF World Tour									Best	Ref
Tournament	2018	2019	2020	2021	2022	2023	2024	2025	2026	Best	Ref
Thailand Masters	A		NH		A				Q1	Q1 ('26)	
German Open	A		NH		A				QF	QF ('26)	
Swiss Open	A		NH	A					Q1	Q1 ('26)	
Orléans Masters	A		NH	A					Q2	Q2 ('26)	
Baoji China Masters	N/A						A		SF	SF ('26)	
Malaysia Masters	A			NH	A				1R	1R ('26)	
Australian Open	A		NH		A				2R	2R ('26)	
U.S. Open	A		NH			A			1R	1R ('26)	
Canada Open	F	1R	NH		A				2R	F ('18)	
Taipei Open	A		NH		A				1R	1R ('26)	
Korea Masters	A		NH		A				1R	1R ('26)	
Indonesia Masters Super 100	A	2R	NH		A			A	2R	2R ('19, '25 II, '26 I)	
Indonesia Masters Super 100	A	2R	NH		A			2R	A	2R ('19, '25 II, '26 I)	
Vietnam Open	2R	SF	NH		A				SF	SF ('19, '26)	
Arctic Open	N/A					A			1R	1R ('26)	
Malaysia Super 100	N/A					A		2R	A	2R ('25)	
Hylo Open	A								2R	2R ('26)	
Korea Open	A		NH		A				1R	1R ('26)	
Japan Masters	N/A					A	1R	A	1R	1R ('24, '26)	
Kaohsiung Masters	N/A					2R	A			2R ('23)	
Hong Kong Open	A		NH			A			Q1	Q1 ('26)	
Syed Modi International	A		NH		A			SF	A	SF ('25)	
Akita Masters	QF	1R	NH			N/A				QF ('18)	
Year-end ranking	144	94	104	123	82	118	198	89		48	
Tournament	2018	2019	2020	2021	2022	2023	2024	2025	2026	Best	Ref

== Record against selected opponents ==
Record against Year-end Finals finalists, World Championships semi-finalists, and Olympic quarter-finalists. Accurate as of 11 November 2026.

Player	M	W	L	Diff.
(China) Shi Yuqi	1	0	1	–1
(China) Zhao Junpeng	1	1	0	+1
(France) Christo Popov	2	1	1	0
(India) Prannoy H. S.	1	0	1	–1
(Japan) Kodai Naraoka	1	0	1	–1

Player	M	W	L	Diff.
(Malaysia) Lee Zii Jia	2	1	1	0
(Singapore) Loh Kean Yew	1	1	0	+1
(Thailand) Kunlavut Vitidsarn	1	1	0	+1
(Thailand) Kantaphon Wangcharoen	1	1	0	+1
(Vietnam) Nguyễn Tiến Minh	1	1	0	+1
