= Réunion Open =

Badminton championships

The Réunion Open is an open international badminton tournament in Réunion, an overseas department and region of France. It was the highest international championships in Réunion. The event is part of the Badminton World Federation's International Challenge and part of the Badminton Confederation of Africa's circuit. The inaugural edition was held in 2022.

== Winners ==
Year	Men's singles	Women's singles	Men's doubles	Women's doubles	Mixed doubles	Ref
2022	(Japan) Riku Hatano	(Japan) Riko Gunji	(Japan) Shuntaro Mezaki (Japan) Haruya Nishida	(Germany) Annabella Jäger (Germany) Leona Michalski	(Japan) Sumiya Nihei (Japan) Minami Asakura	
2023	(France) Arnaud Merklé	(Japan) Hina Akechi	(India) Krishna Prasad Garaga (India) Vishnuvardhan Goud Panjala	(France) Margot Lambert (France) Anne Tran	(Algeria) Koceila Mammeri (Algeria) Tanina Mammeri	
2024	(India) Tharun Mannepalli	(India) Tasnim Mir	(France) Julien Maio (France) William Villeger	(Japan) Kaho Osawa (Japan) Mai Tanabe	(France) Julien Maio (France) Léa Palermo	
2025	(Japan) Riki Takei	(India) Isharani Baruah	(India) Hariharan Amsakarunan (India) Ruban Kumar	(Sweden) Moa Sjöö (Sweden) Tilda Sjöö	(Germany) Marvin Seidel (Germany) Thuc Phuong Nguyen	
2026	(India) Rounak Chouhan	(India) Tasnim Mir	(India) Krishna Prasad Garaga (India) Pruthvi Roy	(Canada) Jackie Dent (Canada) Crystal Lai	(India) Ishaan Bhatnagar (India) Shruti Mishra	

== Performances by nation ==
As of the 2026 edition

Pos.	Nation	MS	WS	MD	WD	XD	Total
1	India	2	3	3		1	9
2	Japan	2	2	1	1	1	7
3	France*	1		1	1	1	4
4	Germany				1	1	2
5	Algeria					1	1
5	Canada				1		1
5	Sweden				1		1
Total		5	5	5	5	5	25

* Host nation
