= Shuntaro Mezaki =

Japanese badminton player (born 2002)

Personal information
- Born: 27 June 2002 (age 24) Niigata Prefecture, Japan
- Height: 1.68 m (5 ft 6 in)
- Weight: 60 kg (132 lb)

Sport
- Country: Japan
- Sport: Badminton
- Handedness: Right
- Coached by: Hengky Irawan (TONAMI)

Men's doubles
- Career record: 63 wins, 32 losses (66.32%)
- Highest ranking: 44 (with Haruya Nishida, 11 April 2023)
- Current ranking: 75 (with Yuta Oku, 17 November 2026)
- BWF profile

Shuntaro Mezaki (目崎 駿太郎, Mezaki Shuntaro; born 27 June 2002) is a Japanese badminton player from Niigata who competes in men's doubles events. He is a member of the Japanese national team and plays for the TONAMI Transportation badminton team. Mezaki reached a career-high men's doubles world ranking of No. 44 alongside his former partner Haruya Nishida. He won his first international title in 2022 at the Mexican International. In 2026, he reached his first final on the BWF World Tour at the Baoji China Masters with Yuta Oku.

== Career ==
Mezaki began his international career in a men's doubles partnership with Haruya Nishida. In February 2022, he represented Japan at the Asia Team Championships, where the men's team was eliminated in the group stage. Two months later, Mezaki and Nishida won their first international title at the Mexican International, defeating the German duo of Jones Ralfy Jansen and Jan Colin Völker. In July 2022, they won the Réunion Open by defeating the Japanese pair of Takuto Inoue and Kenya Mitsuhashi. In early 2023, Mezaki and Nishida secured the Estonian International title against France's Julien Maio and William Villeger. These results helped the pair reach a career-high world ranking of No. 44 in April 2023.

Mezaki subsequently partnered with Yuta Oku. In May 2026, the pair won the Luxembourg Open by defeating compatriots Takuto Goto and Tsubasa Yoshida. Later that year, Mezaki reached his first BWF World Tour final at the Super 100 Baoji China Masters, where he and Oku finished as runners-up.

== Achievements ==
=== BWF World Tour (1 runner-up) ===
The BWF World Tour, which was announced on 19 March 2017 and implemented in 2018, is a series of elite badminton tournaments sanctioned by the Badminton World Federation (BWF). The BWF World Tour is divided into levels of World Tour Finals, Super 1000, Super 750, Super 500, Super 300, and the BWF Tour Super 100.

Men's doubles
Year	Tournament	Level	Partner	Opponent	Score	Result	Ref.
2026	Baoji China Masters	Super 100	(Japan) Yuta Oku	(China) Ma Shang (China) Shen Xuanyao	15–21, 21–19, 13–21	(silver) Runner-up	

=== BWF International Challenge/Series (4 titles) ===
Men's doubles
Year	Tournament	Partner	Opponent	Score	Result	Ref.
2022	Mexican International	(Japan) Haruya Nishida	(Germany) Jones Ralfy Jansen (Germany) Jan Colin Völker	21–15, 21–16	(gold) Winner	
2022	Réunion Open	(Japan) Haruya Nishida	(Japan) Takuto Inoue (Japan) Kenya Mitsuhashi	16–21, 21–18, 21–10	(gold) Winner	
2023	Estonian International	(Japan) Haruya Nishida	(France) Julien Maio (France) William Villeger	21–19, 21–14	(gold) Winner	
2026	Luxembourg Open	(Japan) Yuta Oku	(Japan) Takuto Goto (Japan) Tsubasa Yoshida	21–18, 21–12	(gold) Winner	

BWF International Challenge tournament
BWF International Series tournament
