= 2018 Canada Open (badminton) =

Tournament details
- Dates: 19–24 June
- Level: Super 100
- Total prize money: US$75,000
- Venue: Canadian Winter Sport Institute
- Location: Calgary, Alberta, Canada

Champions
- Men's singles: (China) Lu Guangzu
- Women's singles: (China) Li Xuerui
- Men's doubles: (England) Marcus Ellis (England) Chris Langridge
- Women's doubles: (Japan) Ayako Sakuramoto (Japan) Yukiko Takahata
- Mixed doubles: (England) Marcus Ellis (England) Lauren Smith

The 2018 Canada Open (officially known as the Yonex Canada Open 2018 for sponsorship reasons) was a badminton tournament that took place at Canadian Winter Sport Institute in Canada from 19 to 24 June 2018 and had a total purse of $75,000.

== Tournament ==
The 2018 Canada Open was the third Super 100 tournament of the 2018 BWF World Tour and also part of the Canada Open championships which has been held since 1957. This tournament was organized by the Badminton Canada with the sanction of the BWF.

=== Venue ===
This international tournament was held at Markin-MacPhail Centre in Calgary, Alberta, Canada.

=== Point distribution ===
Below is the point distribution for each phase of the tournament based on the BWF points system for the BWF Tour Super 100 event.

| Winner | Runner-up | 3/4 | 5/8 | 9/16 | 17/32 | 33/64 | 65/128 | 129/256 |
|---|---|---|---|---|---|---|---|---|
| 5,500 | 4,680 | 3,850 | 3,030 | 2,110 | 1,290 | 510 | 240 | 100 |

=== Prize money ===
The total prize money for this tournament was US$75,000. Distribution of prize money was in accordance with BWF regulations.

| Event | Winner | Finals | Semi-finals | Quarter-finals | Last 16 |
| Singles | $5,625 | $2,850 | $1,087.50 | $450 | $262.5 |
| Doubles | $5,925 | $2,850 | $1,050 | $543.75 | $281.25 |

== Men's singles ==
=== Seeds ===
1. (India) Sameer Verma (withdrew)
2. (Netherlands) Mark Caljouw (third round)
3. (Brazil) Ygor Coelho de Oliveira (second round)
4. (China) Huang Yuxiang (second round)
5. (South Korea) Lee Dong-keun (second round)
6. (Japan) Yu Igarashi (second round)
7. (Vietnam) Nguyễn Tiến Minh (third round)
8. (England) Toby Penty (quarter-finals)

=== Finals ===
Semi-finals
Q4 | (Japan) Minoru Koga | 21 | 21
(Denmark) Kim Bruun | 16 | 8
(France) Thomas Rouxel | 18 | 21 | 16
(China) Lu Guangzu | 21 | 19 | 21

Final
Q4 | (Japan) Minoru Koga | 15 | 10
(China) Lu Guangzu | 21 | 21

=== Top half ===
==== Section 1 ====
First round
(Canada) T Chiu | 13 | 19
(China) Zhao JP | 21 | 21
(Guatemala) K Cordón | 9 | 15
(Germany) K Schäfer | 21 | 21
(India) K Gulshan Kumar | 17 | 4
(Japan) R Takeshita | 21 | 21
Q1 | (Canada) K Tyagi | 12 | 6
Q4 | (Japan) M Koga | 21 | 21

Second round
PFQ | (Vietnam) Nguyễn H N | 14 | 7^{r}
(China) Zhao JP | 21 | 13
(Thailand) S Thammasin | 21 | 21
(Germany) K Schäfer | 13 | 12
7 | (Vietnam) Nguyễn T M | 21 | 18 | 21
(Japan) R Takeshita | 12 | 21 | 17
(Czech Republic) M Ludík | 0^{r}
Q4 | (Japan) M Koga | 3

Third round
(China) Zhao JP | 21 | 21
(Thailand) S Thammasin | 15 | 16
7 | (Vietnam) Nguyễn T M | 21 | 3 | 16
Q4 | (Japan) M Koga | 17 | 21 | 21

Quarter-finals
(China) Zhao JP | 18 | 21 | 17
Q4 | (Japan) M Koga | 21 | 17 | 21

==== Section 2 ====
First round
(Denmark) K Bruun | 21 | 21
Q2 | (Canada) J Hurlburt-Yu | 16 | 14
(Trinidad and Tobago) N Bonkowsky | 5 | 8
(Sri Lanka) N Karunaratne | 21 | 21
(Vietnam) Phạm C C | 21 | 17 | 21
(United States) T Lam | 13 | 21 | 19
Q3 | (Canada) Huang GX | w | / | o
(India) K. A Kumar

Second round
3 | (Brazil) Y Coelho | 16 | 14
(Denmark) K Bruun | 21 | 21
(Canada) B. R. Sankeerth | 7 | 17
(Sri Lanka) N Karunaratne | 21 | 21
5 | (South Korea) Lee D-k | 26 | 21
(Vietnam) Phạm C C | 28 | 23
Q5 | (Malaysia) Woon K H | 21 | 13 | 11
Q3 | (Canada) Huang GX | 19 | 21 | 21

Third round
(Denmark) K Bruun | 21 | 14 | 21
(Sri Lanka) N Karunaratne | 17 | 21 | 14
(Vietnam) Phạm C C | 15 | 21 | 23
Q3 | (Canada) Huang GX | 21 | 14 | 21

Quarter-finals
(Denmark) K Bruun | w | / | o
(Vietnam) Phạm C C

=== Bottom half ===
==== Section 3 ====
First round
(Germany) M Weißkirchen | 21 | 21
(Chinese Taipei) Kan C-y | 14 | 19
PFQ | (Canada) K Barkman | 15 | 10
(South Korea) Heo K-h | 21 | 21
(India) S Dey | 16 | 12
(France) T Rouxel | 21 | 21
(Japan) K Naraoka | 21 | 21
(Canada) A Li | 12 | 6

Second round
(Germany) M Weißkirchen | 21 | 22
(Sweden) J Nilsson | 16 | 20
(South Korea) Heo K-h | 21 | 21
6 | (Japan) Y Igarashi | 18 | 13
(France) T Rouxel | 21 | 21
(Canada) Jason H-s | 12 | 17
(Japan) K Naraoka | 19 | 21 | 21
4 | (China) Huang YX | 21 | 17 | 19

Third round
(Germany) M Weißkirchen | 21 | 21
(South Korea) Heo K-h | 19 | 13
(France) T Rouxel | 21 | 11 | 22
(Japan) K Naraoka | 17 | 21 | 20

Quarter-finals
(Germany) M Weißkirchen | 17 | 21 | 16
(France) T Rouxel | 21 | 18 | 21

==== Section 4 ====
First round
(Canada) Sheng XD | 14 | 21 | 22
Q6 | (Japan) T Obayashi | 21 | 19 | 24
(South Korea) Ha Y-w | 21 | 21
(Finland) K Koljonen | 11 | 17
(Germany) A Roovers | 9 | 7
(China) Lu GZ | 21 | 21
(Japan) H Shimono | 21 | 21
Q8 | (Canada) M Morneau | 12 | 10

Second round
Q6 | (Japan) T Obayashi | 21 | 21
Q7 | (Canada) I Wadia | 13 | 13
(South Korea) Ha Y-w | 18 | 9
8 | (England) T Penty | 21 | 21
(China) Lu GZ | 21 | 21
PFQ | (South Korea) Lee Y-k | 19 | 15
(Japan) H Shimono | 21 | 18 | 17
2 | (Netherlands) M Caljouw | 15 | 21 | 21

Third round
Q6 | (Japan) T Obayashi | 17 | 13
8 | (England) T Penty | 21 | 21
(China) Lu GZ | 21 | 22
2 | (Netherlands) M Caljouw | 10 | 20

Quarter-finals
8 | (England) T Penty | 19 | 21 | 11
(China) Lu GZ | 21 | 12 | 21

== Women's singles ==
=== Seeds ===
1. (Canada) Michelle Li (second round)
2. (Japan) Sayaka Takahashi (final)
3. (South Korea) Kim Hyo-min (first round)
4. (Japan) Minatsu Mitani (first round)
5. (China) Gao Fangjie (quarter-finals)
6. (Denmark) Natalia Koch Rohde (withdrew)
7. (Canada) Rachel Honderich (quarter-finals)
8. (Canada) Brittney Tam (second round)

=== Finals ===
Semi-finals
Q2 | (China) Li Xuerui | 21 | 9 | 21
Q1 | (Japan) Asuka Takahashi | 11 | 21 | 12
(China) Cai Yanyan | 17 | 16
2 | (Japan) Sayaka Takahashi | 21 | 21

Final
Q2 | (China) Li Xuerui | 22 | 15 | 21
2 | (Japan) Sayaka Takahashi | 20 | 21 | 17

=== Top half ===
==== Section 1 ====
First round
1 | (Canada) M Li | 21 | 21
(Vietnam) Vũ T T | 13 | 9
(United States) D Gupta | 6 | 6
Q2 | (China) Li XR | 21 | 21
PFQ | (United States) C Pan | 20 | 12
Q3 | (Japan) M Hayashi | 22 | 21
Q4 | (Canada) A Mocanu | 13 | 17
(Germany) F Deprez | 21 | 21

Second round
1 | (Canada) M Li | 15 | 21 | 10
Q2 | (China) Li XR | 21 | 13 | 21
Q3 | (Japan) M Hayashi | 21 | 20 | 21
(Germany) F Deprez | 14 | 22 | 18

Quarter-finals
Q2 | (China) Li XR | 21 | 21
Q3 | (Japan) M Hayashi | 13 | 13

==== Section 2 ====
First round
4 | (Japan) M Mitani | 14 | 17
(South Korea) Lee S-y | 21 | 21
Q1 | (Japan) A Takahashi | 13 | 23 | 21
(China) Han Y | 21 | 21 | 18
7 | (Canada) R Honderich | 18 | 22 | 21
(England) C Birch | 21 | 20 | 17
(Japan) A Mine | 23 | 21
(China) Zhang YM | 21 | 15

Second round
(South Korea) Lee S-y | 10 | 21 | 15
Q1 | (Japan) A Takahashi | 21 | 19 | 21
7 | (Canada) R Honderich | 21 | 21
(Japan) A Mine | 16 | 17

Quarter-finals
Q1 | (Japan) A Takahashi | 21 | 21
7 | (Canada) R Honderich | 17 | 18

=== Bottom half ===
==== Section 3 ====
First round
(England) G Bland | 8 | 6
(Japan) S Saito | 21 | 21
(South Korea) Kim G-e | 9 | 18
5 | (China) Gao FJ | 21 | 21
(China) Cai YY | 21 | 21
(Denmark) M Poulsen | 8 | 16
(Germany) Y Li | 21 | 21
3 | (South Korea) Kim H-m | 17 | 15

Second round
(Japan) S Saito | 16 | 19
5 | (China) Gao FJ | 21 | 21
(China) Cai YY | 21 | 21
(Germany) Y Li | 15 | 8

Quarter-finals
5 | (China) Gao FJ | 17 | 12
(China) Cai YY | 21 | 21

==== Section 4 ====
First round
(Japan) Y Nakai | 19 | 21 | 10
(South Korea) Jeon J-i | 21 | 16 | 21
PFQ | (Indonesia) R A Riodingin | 8 | 25
8 | (Canada) B Tam | 21 | 27
(United States) J Hsu | 18 | 18
(Denmark) J D Jakobsen | 21 | 21
(Germany) L Heim | 19 | 8
2 | (Japan) S Takahashi | 21 | 21

Second round
(South Korea) Jeon J-i | 21 | 21
8 | (Canada) B Tam | 18 | 12
(Denmark) J D Jakobsen | 6 | 9
2 | (Japan) S Takahashi | 21 | 21

Quarter-finals
(South Korea) Jeon J-i | 10 | 21 | 8
2 | (Japan) S Takahashi | 21 | 18 | 21

== Men's doubles ==
=== Seeds ===
1. (England) Marcus Ellis / Chris Langridge (champions)
2. (Germany) Mark Lamsfuß / Marvin Emil Seidel (final)
3. (Germany) Josche Zurwonne / Jones Ralfy Jansen (first round)
4. (Netherlands) Jelle Maas / Robin Tabeling (second round)
5. (Thailand) Nipitphon Phuangphuapet / Nanthakarn Yordphaisong (second round)
6. (China) Han Chengkai / Zhou Haodong (quarter-finals)
7. (England) Peter Briggs / Tom Wolfenden (second round)
8. (Canada) Jason Ho-shue / Nyl Yakura (quarter-finals)

=== Finals ===
Semi-finals

Final

1
- (England) Marcus Ellis
- (England) Chris Langridge
21
22
21

(Thailand) Inkarat Apisuk
(Thailand) Tanupat Viriyangkura
23
20
14

1
- (England) Marcus Ellis
- (England) Chris Langridge
19
21
22

2
- (Germany) Mark Lamsfuß
- (Germany) Marvin Emil Seidel
21
18
20

- (China) Di Zijian
- (China) Wang Chang
14
16

2
- (Germany) Mark Lamsfuß
- (Germany) Marvin Emil Seidel
21
21

=== Top half ===
==== Section 1 ====
First round

Second round

Quarter-finals

1
- (England) M Ellis
- (England) C Langridge
21
21

- (Canada) P Charron
- (Canada) M Tétreault
7
13

1
- (England) M Ellis
- (England) C Langridge
21
14
21

- (Japan) M Kaneko
- (Japan) Y Kubota
9
21
13

- (Japan) M Kaneko
- (Japan) Y Kubota
21
21

- (United States) P Chew
- (United States) R Chew
11
11

1
- (England) M Ellis
- (England) C Langridge
15
22
21

8
- (Canada) J Ho-shue
- (Canada) N Yakura
21
20
16

8
- (Canada) J Ho-shue
- (Canada) N Yakura
21
21

- (Thailand) P Kuna-Anuvit
- (Thailand) N Trinkajee
9
12

8
- (Canada) J Ho-shue
- (Canada) N Yakura
21
21

- (South Korea) Kim H-t
- (South Korea) Park K-h
15
17

- (South Korea) Kim H-t
- (South Korea) Park K-h
21
21

- (Canada) B. R. Sankeerth
- (Canada) T Ng
11
14

==== Section 2 ====
First round

Second round

Quarter-finals

3
- (Germany) J R Jansen
- (Germany) J Zurwonne
18
18

- (England) B Lane
- (England) S Vendy
21
21

- (England) B Lane
- (England) S Vendy
21
14
18

(Thailand) I Apisuk
(Thailand) T Viriyangkura
12
21
21

(Thailand) I Apisuk
(Thailand) T Viriyangkura
21
14
21

- (Vietnam) Đỗ T Đ
- (Vietnam) Phạm H N
15
21
14

(Thailand) I Apisuk
(Thailand) T Viriyangkura
16
21
21

6
- (China) Han CK
- (China) Zhou HD
21
19
15

6
- (China) Han CK
- (China) Zhou HD
21
21

- (Canada) A J Bauer
- (Canada) K Lee
16
11

6
- (China) Han CK
- (China) Zhou HD
21
21

Q1
- (Japan) A Koga
- (Japan) T Saito
16
19

Q1
- (Japan) A Koga
- (Japan) T Saito
16
21
21

- (China) Ou XY
- (China) Ren XY
21
14
17

=== Bottom half ===
==== Section 3 ====
First round

Second round

Quarter-finals

- (Netherlands) J Arends
- (Netherlands) R Jille
21
21

- (South Korea) Jung J-w
- (South Korea) Kim J-h
19
15

- (Netherlands) J Arends
- (Netherlands) R Jille
21
21

7
- (England) P Briggs
- (England) T Wolfenden
13
17

- (Vietnam) Bảo M
- (Vietnam) Dương B Đ
13
9

7
- (England) P Briggs
- (England) T Wolfenden
21
21

- (Netherlands) J Arends
- (Netherlands) R Jille
15
19

- (China) Di ZJ
- (China) Wang C
21
21

- (China) Di ZJ
- (China) Wang C
22
19
21

- (Chinese Taipei) Kan C-y
- (Chinese Taipei) Liao C-h
20
21
12

- (China) Di ZJ
- (China) Wang C
21
23

4
- (Netherlands) J Maas
- (Netherlands) R Tabeling
13
21

- (Guatemala) J Solís
- (Guatemala) R Ramírez

4
- (Netherlands) J Maas
- (Netherlands) R Tabeling
w
/
o

==== Section 4 ====
First round

Second round

Quarter-finals

Q3
- (Canada) T Chiu
- (Canada) I Wadia
10
15

- (South Korea) Kang M-h
- (South Korea) Kim W-h
21
21

- (South Korea) Kang M-h
- (South Korea) Kim W-h
21
21

5
- (Thailand) N Phuangphuapet
- (Thailand) N Yordphaisong
19
16

- (Malaysia) M R A Latif
- (Malaysia) N A M Rumsani
10
14

5
- (Thailand) N Phuangphuapet
- (Thailand) N Yordphaisong
21
21

- (South Korea) Kang M-h
- (South Korea) Kim W-h
16
14

2
- (Germany) M Lamsfuß
- (Germany) M E Seidel
21
21

Q2
- (Canada) J Hurlburt-Yu
- (Canada) D Yao
17
21
16

- (Japan) H Okamura
- (Japan) M Onodera
21
14
21

- (Japan) H Okamura
- (Japan) M Onodera
16
14

2
- (Germany) M Lamsfuß
- (Germany) M E Seidel
21
21

Q4
- (United States) W Tsai
- (United States) B Zhao
9
9

2
- (Germany) M Lamsfuß
- (Germany) M E Seidel
21
21

== Women's doubles ==
=== Seeds ===
1. (Japan) Ayako Sakuramoto / Yukiko Takahata (champions)
2. (Netherlands) Selena Piek / Cheryl Seinen (second round)
3. (France) Émilie Lefel / Anne Tran (semi-finals)
4. (Japan) Misato Aratama / Akane Watanabe (second round)

=== Finals ===
Semi-finals

Final

1
- (Japan) Ayako Sakuramoto
- (Japan) Yukiko Takahata
21
21

3
- (France) Émilie Lefel
- (France) Anne Tran
11
9

1
- (Japan) Ayako Sakuramoto
- (Japan) Yukiko Takahata
21
21

- (Germany) Isabel Herttrich
- (Germany) Carla Nelte
13
15

- (Germany) Isabel Herttrich
- (Germany) Carla Nelte
18
21
21

- (Japan) Nami Matsuyama
- (Japan) Chiharu Shida
21
13
19

=== Top half ===
==== Section 1 ====
First round

Second round

Quarter-finals

1
- (Japan) A Sakuramoto
- (Japan) Y Takahata
11
21
21

- (South Korea) Kim H-j
- (South Korea) Kim S-y
21
21

- (South Korea) Kim H-j
- (South Korea) Kim S-y
21
17
12

- (United States) A Lee
- (United States) S Lee
7
5

1
- (Japan) A Sakuramoto
- (Japan) Y Takahata
21
21

- (China) Tang JH
- (China) Yu XH
19
15

- (Thailand) S Paewsampran
- (Thailand) P Supajirakul
12
13

- (Canada) S Hui
- (Indonesia) R A Riodingin
4
8

- (China) Tang JH
- (China) Yu XH
21
21

- (China) Tang JH
- (China) Yu XH
21
21

==== Section 2 ====
First round

Second round

Quarter-finals

3
- (France) É Lefel
- (France) A Tran
21
21

- (China) Dong WJ
- (China) Feng XY
21
21

- (China) Dong WJ
- (China) Feng XY
12
17

- (United States) E Kan
- (United States) I Zhong
16
14

3
- (France) É Lefel
- (France) A Tran
21
21

(Thailand) S Amitrapai
(Thailand) P Chochuwong

- (Germany) L Efler
- (Germany) E Janssens
19
13

- (Germany) L Efler
- (Germany) E Janssens
w
/
o

- (Germany) L Efler
- (Germany) E Janssens
21
21

- (Canada) R Honderich
- (Canada) K Tsai
11
18

- (England) C Birch
- (England) J Moore
18
15

- (England) C Birch
- (England) J Moore
21
21

=== Bottom half ===
==== Section 3 ====
First round

Second round

Quarter-finals

- (Denmark) J Finne-Ipsen
- (Denmark) R Søby Hansen
20
15

- (Germany) J Goliszewski
- (Germany) L Käpplein
22
21

- (Germany) J Goliszewski
- (Germany) L Käpplein
23
21

- (Japan) Y Nakai
- (Japan) N Ono

- (Sweden) E Karlsson
- (Sweden) J Magnusson
21
13

- (Sweden) E Karlsson
- (Sweden) J Magnusson
w
/
o

- (Germany) J Goliszewski
- (Germany) L Käpplein
11
13

- (Germany) I Herttrich
- (Germany) C Nelte
21
21

- (Germany) I Herttrich
- (Germany) C Nelte
21
21

- (United States) B Chi
- (United States) M Huang
9
10

- (Germany) I Herttrich
- (Germany) C Nelte
21
21

4
- (Japan) M Aratama
- (Japan) A Watanabe
16
18

==== Section 4 ====
First round

Second round

Quarter-finals

- (England) J Pugh
- (England) L Smith
20
21
24

- (Sweden) A Högström
- (Sweden) C Nistad
22
15
26

- (Sweden) A Högström
- (Sweden) C Nistad
21
21

- (United States) J Gai
- (United States) J Hsu
19
21
19

- (Canada) M Tong
- (Canada) J Wu
13
16

- (Canada) M Tong
- (Canada) J Wu
21
18
21

- (Sweden) A Högström
- (Sweden) C Nistad
16
10

- (Japan) N Matsuyama
- (Japan) C Shida
21
21

- (Japan) N Matsuyama
- (Japan) C Shida
21
21

- (Canada) E Zhang
- (Canada) W Zhang
15
8

- (Japan) N Matsuyama
- (Japan) C Shida
21
21

2
- (Netherlands) S Piek
- (Netherlands) C Seinen
15
15

== Mixed doubles ==
=== Seeds ===
1. (England) Marcus Ellis / Lauren Smith (champions)
2. (Germany) Mark Lamsfuß / Isabel Herttrich (final)
3. (Netherlands) Jacco Arends / Selena Piek (semi-finals)
4. (Germany) Marvin Emil Seidel / Linda Efler (semi-finals)
5. (China) Lu Kai / Chen Lu (quarter-finals)
6. (England) Ben Lane / Jessica Pugh (second round)
7. (Netherlands) Robin Tabeling / Cheryl Seinen (quarter-finals)
8. (Vietnam) Đỗ Tuấn Đức / Phạm Như Thảo (first round)

=== Finals ===
Semi-finals

Final

1
- (England) Marcus Ellis
- (England) Lauren Smith
21
21

4
- (Germany) Marvin Emil Seidel
- (Germany) Linda Efler
15
11

1
- (England) Marcus Ellis
- (England) Lauren Smith
21
21

2
- (Germany) Mark Lamsfuß
- (Germany) Isabel Herttrich
13
4

3
- (Netherlands) Jacco Arends
- (Netherlands) Selena Piek
19
19

2
- (Germany) Mark Lamsfuß
- (Germany) Isabel Herttrich
21
21

=== Top half ===
==== Section 1 ====
First round

Second round

Quarter-finals

1
- (England) M Ellis
- (England) L Smith
21
21

- (France) J Corvée
- (France) A Tran
16
11

1
- (England) M Ellis
- (England) L Smith
21
21

- (Germany) P Käsbauer
- (Germany) O Konon
12
8

Q3
- (Japan) T Saito
- (Japan) A Watanabe
24
21
17

- (Germany) P Käsbauer
- (Germany) O Konon
26
16
21

1
- (England) M Ellis
- (England) L Smith
21
21

Q2
(Japan) T Urai
(Japan) R Miyaura
8
12

6
- (England) B Lane
- (England) J Pugh
17
21
21

Q1
- (Canada) A Dong
- (Canada) O Lei
21
8
19

6
- (England) B Lane
- (England) J Pugh
7
21
15

Q2
(Japan) T Urai
(Japan) R Miyaura
21
10
21

- (United States) R Chew
- (United States) S Lee
12
10

Q2
(Japan) T Urai
(Japan) R Miyaura
21
21

==== Section 2 ====
First round

Second round

Quarter-finals

4
- (Germany) M E Seidel
- (Germany) L Efler
21
21

- (Canada) N Yakura
- (Canada) K Tsai
18
16

4
- (Germany) M E Seidel
- (Germany) L Efler
21
13
21

Q4
- (Japan) K Gondo
- (Japan) A Kurihara
16
21
16

- (Thailand) P Kuna-Anuvit
- (Thailand) S Paewsampran
8
10

Q4
- (Japan) K Gondo
- (Japan) A Kurihara
21
21

4
- (Germany) M E Seidel
- (Germany) L Efler
21
21

7
- (Netherlands) R Tabeling
- (Netherlands) C Seinen
14
14

7
- (Netherlands) R Tabeling
- (Netherlands) C Seinen
18
21
21

- (Sweden) R Eidestedt
- (Sweden) C Nistad
21
10
18

7
- (Netherlands) R Tabeling
- (Netherlands) C Seinen
21
21

- (South Korea) Kim H-t
- (South Korea) Kim H-j
14
8

- (United States) W Tsai
- (United States) B Chi
8
11

- (South Korea) Kim H-t
- (South Korea) Kim H-j
21
21

=== Bottom half ===
==== Section 3 ====
First round

Second round

Quarter-finals

PFQ
- (Japan) Y Kubota
- (Japan) C Shida
21
14
9

- (Japan) K Mitsuhashi
- (Japan) N Shinoya
18
21
21

- (Japan) K Mitsuhashi
- (Japan) N Shinoya
14
9

5
- (China) Lu K
- (China) Chen L
21
21

- (United States) P Chew
- (United States) A Lee
10
11

5
- (China) Lu K
- (China) Chen L
21
21

5
- (China) Lu K
- (China) Chen L
16
21
15

3
- (Netherlands) J Arends
- (Netherlands) S Piek
21
15
21

- (Germany) J R Jansen
- (Germany) C Nelte
21
21

- (United States) M Fogarty
- (United States) I Zhong
12
7

- (Germany) J R Jansen
- (Germany) C Nelte
21
12

3
- (Netherlands) J Arends
- (Netherlands) S Piek
23
21

- (England) G Mairs
- (England) J Moore
18
18

3
- (Netherlands) J Arends
- (Netherlands) S Piek
21
21

==== Section 4 ====
First round

Second round

Quarter-finals

- (Canada) D Yao
- (Canada) J Wu
16
14

- (Thailand) N Phuangphuapet
- (Thailand) S Amitrapai
21
21

- (Thailand) N Phuangphuapet
- (Thailand) S Amitrapai
21
2

- (Germany) J Zurwonne
- (Germany) E Janssens
16
1^{r}

- (Germany) J Zurwonne
- (Germany) E Janssens
21
21

8
- (Vietnam) Đỗ T Đ
- (Vietnam) Phạm N T
19
17

- (Thailand) N Phuangphuapet
- (Thailand) S Amitrapai
13
16

2
- (Germany) M Lamsfuß
- (Germany) I Herttrich
21
21

- (Malaysia) M R A Latif
- (Indonesia) R A Riodingin
18
19

- (Netherlands) R Jille
- (France) É Lefel
21
21

- (Netherlands) R Jille
- (France) É Lefel
15
15

2
- (Germany) M Lamsfuß
- (Germany) I Herttrich
21
21

- (China) Ou XY
- (China) Cao TW
13
10

2
- (Germany) M Lamsfuß
- (Germany) I Herttrich
21
21

| Preceded by 2018 U.S. Open | BWF World Tour; 2018 BWF season | Succeeded by 2018 Malaysia Open |
