= 2026 Baoji China Masters =

Badminton tournament in China

Tournament details
- Dates: 12–17 May
- Edition: 3rd
- Level: Super 100
- Total prize money: US$120,000
- Venue: Baoji City Gymnasium
- Location: Baoji, China

Champions
- Men's singles: (China) Sun Chao
- Women's singles: (China) Yuan Anqi
- Men's doubles: (China) Ma Shang (China) Shen Xuanyao
- Women's doubles: (Japan) Sumire Nakade (Japan) Miyu Takahashi
- Mixed doubles: (China) Ma Xixiang (China) Qin Huizhi

The 2026 Baoji China Masters was a badminton tournament that took place in Baoji, China, from 12 to 17 May 2026 and had a total purse of $120,000.

== Tournament ==
The 2026 Baoji China Masters was the eleventh tournament of the 2026 BWF World Tour. This is the third edition of Baoji China Masters. The tournament is organized by the Chinese Badminton Association and sanctioned by the BWF.

=== Venue ===
This tournament was held at the Baoji City Gymnasium in Baoji, China.

=== Point distribution ===
Below is a table with the point distribution for each phase of the tournament based on the BWF points system for the BWF Tour Super 100 event.

Winner	Runner-up	3/4	5/8	9/16	17/32	33/64	65/128
5,500	4,680	3,850	3,030	2,110	1,290	510	240

=== Prize money ===
The total prize money for this tournament is US$120,000. Distribution of prize money is in accordance with BWF regulations.

Event	Winner	Finals	Semi-finals	Quarter-finals	Last 16
Singles	$9,000	$4,560	$1,740	$720	$420
Doubles	$9,480	$4,560	$1,680	$870	$450

== Men's singles ==
=== Seeds ===
1. (Japan) Minoru Koga (semi-finals)
2. (Japan) Shogo Ogawa (second round)
3. (Indonesia) Richie Duta Richardo (second round)
4. (Chinese Taipei) Huang Ping-hsien (second round)
5. (Japan) Riki Takei (final)
6. (Indonesia) Chico Aura Dwi Wardoyo (second round)
7. (Malaysia) Eogene Ewe (third round)
8. (Chinese Taipei) Wang Yu-kai (quarter-finals)

=== Finals ===
Semi-finals
1	(Japan) Minoru Koga	6	12
5	(Japan) Riki Takei	21	21
(Japan) Riku Hatano	10	19
(China) Sun Chao	21	21

Final
5	(Japan) Riki Takei	12	13
(China) Sun Chao	21	21

=== Top half ===
==== Section 1 ====
First round
(Chinese Taipei) Huang Y-k	21	21
(Thailand) K Laotrakul	17	17
(Japan) T Noda	12	22	21
(Malaysia) Kok J H	21	20	18
PFQ	(Japan) K Masumoto	9	14
(China) Lei LX	21	21
Q8	(China) Liu YX	11	21	21
(Indonesia) C Adinata	21	17	5

Second round
1	(Japan) M Koga	21	21
(Chinese Taipei) Huang Y-k	15	16
(India) M Singh	21	21
(Japan) T Noda	18	13
7	(Malaysia) E Ewe	14	21	21
(China) Lei LX	21	16	10
(Macau) Pui P F	15	10
Q8	(China) Liu YX	21	21

Third round
1	(Japan) M Koga	14	21	21
(India) M Singh	21	13	15
7	(Malaysia) E Ewe	15	19
Q8	(China) Liu YX	21	21

Quarter-finals
1	(Japan) M Koga	21	18	24
Q8	(China) Liu YX	14	21	22

==== Section 2 ====
First round
(Malaysia) E Hajibeigy	14	14
(India) M Maisnam	21	21
(Malaysia) Lee J J	14	9
Q7	(Chinese Taipei) Su W-c	21	21
(India) N Raj	21	21
Q5	(Chinese Taipei) Liu Y	18	17
(Chinese Taipei) Wu Z-y	14	21	16
(Chinese Taipei) Lu C-h	21	13	21

Second round
4	(Chinese Taipei) Huang P-h	22	18	16
(India) M Maisnam	20	21	21
(India) G Sonna	18	21	21
Q7	(Chinese Taipei) Su W-c	21	18	17
5	(Japan) R Takei	21	21
(India) N Raj	5	13
Q1	(Malaysia) S Lee	21	21
(Chinese Taipei) Lu C-h	19	14

Third round
(India) M Maisnam	21	21
(India) G Sonna	14	14
5	(Japan) R Takei	21	21
Q1	(Malaysia) S Lee	15	11

Quarter-finals
(India) M Maisnam	14	10
5	(Japan) R Takei	21	21

=== Bottom half ===
==== Section 3 ====
First round
Q6	(Chinese Taipei) Lei C-f	19	21	21
(Malaysia) Huan K H	21	10	10
Q2	(Indonesia) H W Kho	21	18	21
(Vietnam) Lê Đ P	16	21	18
(Chinese Taipei) Cheng J-s	17	16
(Japan) K Takahashi	21	21
(Chinese Taipei) Tsai C-h	17	9
(India) T Suveer	21	21

Second round
Q6	(Chinese Taipei) Lei C-f	14	14
(Japan) R Hatano	21	21
Q2	(Indonesia) H W Kho	21	21
6	(Indonesia) C A Dwi Wardoyo	16	15
(Japan) K Takahashi	22	17
Q3	(Chinese Taipei) Huang Y	24	21
(India) T Suveer	21	21
3	(Indonesia) R D Richardo	18	17

Third round
(Japan) R Hatano	21	21
Q2	(Indonesia) H W Kho	17	19
Q3	(Chinese Taipei) Huang Y	18	20
(India) T Suveer	21	22

Quarter-finals
(Japan) R Hatano	11	21	21
(India) T Suveer	21	13	18

==== Section 4 ====
First round
(United States) I Yang	18	15
(Singapore) M Lau	21	21
(Chinese Taipei) Kuo K-l	17	19
Q4	(Malaysia) M Haziq	21	21
(China) Wang ZJ	15	21	21
(Malaysia) Lim M H	21	10	8
(China) Sun C	21	21
(India) D Negi	13	8

Second round
(Singapore) M Lau	21	22
(Malaysia) Ong Z Y	9	20
Q4	(Malaysia) M Haziq	12	18
8	(Chinese Taipei) Wang Y-k	21	21
(China) Wang ZJ	17	21	15
(Malaysia) Cheam J W	21	6	21
(China) Sun C	21	21
2	(Japan) S Ogawa	19	19

Third round
(Singapore) M Lau	15	17
8	(Chinese Taipei) Wang Y-k	21	21
(Malaysia) Cheam J W	9	21	14
(China) Sun C	21	17	21

Quarter-finals
8	(Chinese Taipei) Wang Y-k	14	13
(China) Sun C	21	21

== Women's singles ==
=== Seeds ===
1. (India) Rakshitha Ramraj (second round)
2. (India) Tanya Hemanth (first round)
3. (India) Shriyanshi Valishetty (final)
4. (Chinese Taipei) Huang Ching-ping (first round)
5. (Thailand) Pornpicha Choeikeewong (first round)
6. (Indonesia) Mutiara Ayu Puspitasari (quarter-finals)
7. (India) Ashmita Chaliha (quarter-finals)
8. (Chinese Taipei) Liang Ting-yu (first round)

=== Finals ===
Semi-finals
(China) Xu Wenjing	13	17
3	(India) Shriyanshi Valishetty	21	21
Q1	(China) Yuan Anqi	21	14	21
(Thailand) Thamonwan Nithiittikrai	14	21	16

Final
3	(India) Shriyanshi Valishetty	14	6
Q1	(China) Yuan Anqi	21	21

=== Top half ===
==== Section 1 ====
First round
1	(India) R Ramraj	21	21
(India) S Lele	13	15
(Vietnam) Vũ T T	17	10
(China) Xu WJ	21	21
7	(India) A Chaliha	21	21
(Japan) S Masuki	19	14
(Chinese Taipei) Wang Y-s	7	18
(Chinese Taipei) Peng Y-w	21	21

Second round
1	(India) R Ramraj	15	12
(China) Xu WJ	21	21
7	(India) A Chaliha	21	21
(Chinese Taipei) Peng Y-w	17	17

Quarter-finals
(China) Xu WJ	21	21
7	(India) A Chaliha	17	18

==== Section 2 ====
First round
3	(India) S Valishetty	21	21
Q3	(Chinese Taipei) Han Y-c	14	18
(Chinese Taipei) Liao Y-c	21	21
(Malaysia) Kisona S	12	13
8	(Chinese Taipei) Liang T-y	15	12
(Hong Kong) Liang K W	21	21
(Azerbaijan) K F Azzahra	12	14
(Thailand) P Phannachet	21	21

Second round
3	(India) S Valishetty	21	23
(Chinese Taipei) Liao Y-c	19	21
(Hong Kong) Liang K W	21	20	14
(Thailand) P Phannachet	10	22	21

Quarter-finals
3	(India) S Valishetty	21	21
(Thailand) P Phannachet	11	9

=== Bottom half ===
==== Section 3 ====
First round
(France) R Cloteaux-Foucault	5	16
Q4	(China) Luo SX	21	21
(India) M Nagar	21	11	12
6	(Indonesia) M A Puspitasari	14	21	21
(India) Mansi Singh	9	13
Q1	(China) Yuan AQ	21	21
(Chinese Taipei) Hung Y-t	21	21
4	(Chinese Taipei) Huang C-p	18	19

Second round
Q4	(China) Luo SX	23	13	13
6	(Indonesia) M A Puspitasari	21	21	21
Q1	(China) Yuan AQ	21	21
(Chinese Taipei) Hung Y-t	17	19

Quarter-finals
6	(Indonesia) M A Puspitasari	16	11
Q1	(China) Yuan AQ	21	21

==== Section 4 ====
First round
Q2	(Indonesia) E N T Wardoyo	17	9
(Thailand) T Nithiittikrai	21	21
(Japan) N Sunakawa	21	15	21
5	(Thailand) P Choeikeewong	11	21	15
(Hong Kong) S S Mehta	21	8
(Chinese Taipei) Wang P-y	23	21
(Thailand) Tonr Saeheng	21	21
2	(India) T Hemanth	6	4

Second round
(Thailand) T Nithiittikrai	21	21
(Japan) N Sunakawa	16	8
(Chinese Taipei) Wang P-y	21	14	14
(Thailand) Tonr Saeheng	19	21	21

Quarter-finals
(Thailand) T Nithiittikrai	21	21
(Thailand) Tonr Saeheng	15	17

== Men's doubles ==
=== Seeds ===
1. (Malaysia) Muhammad Faiq / Lok Hong Quan (first round)
2. (Chinese Taipei) Lin Chia-yen / Lin Yong-sheng (second round)
3. (Indonesia) Anselmus Prasetya / Pulung Ramadhan (first round)
4. (Chinese Taipei) Huang Tsung-i / Lin Ting-yu (second round)
5. (Japan) Haruki Kawabe / Kenta Matsukawa (quarter-finals)
6. (Chinese Taipei) Wei Chun-wei / Yang Po-chih (second round)
7. (China) Chen Yongrui / Chen Zhehan (second round)
8. (Indonesia) Dexter Farrell / Wahyu Agung Prasetyo (second round)

=== Finals ===
Semi-finals
(China) Ma Shang (China) Shen Xuanyao	21	21
Q2	(Chinese Taipei) Chen You-an (Chinese Taipei) Lin You-yu	16	9
(Japan) Shuntaro Mezaki (Japan) Yuta Oku	21	19	21
(Chinese Taipei) Chen Sheng-fa (Chinese Taipei) Chiu Shao-hua	19	21	18

Final
(China) Ma Shang (China) Shen Xuanyao	21	19	21
(Japan) Shuntaro Mezaki (Japan) Yuta Oku	15	21	13

=== Top half ===
==== Section 1 ====
First round
1	(Malaysia) M Faiq (Malaysia) Lok H Q	21	11	13
(Chinese Taipei) Cheng K-w (Chinese Taipei) Liao C-p	16	21	21
Q1	(Chinese Taipei) Hung B-f (Chinese Taipei) Liu F-s	21	21
(England) Wang Y H (Australia) Xie ZW	14	14
8	(Indonesia) D Farrell (Indonesia) W A Prasetyo	21	21
Q3	(China) Chen XJ (China) Shan JS	10	18
(Malaysia) Beh C M (Malaysia) Choi J S	13	21	12
(China) Ma S (China) Shen XY	21	19	21

Second round
(Chinese Taipei) Cheng K-w (Chinese Taipei) Liao C-p	18	15
Q1	(Chinese Taipei) Hung B-f (Chinese Taipei) Liu F-s	21	21
8	(Indonesia) D Farrell (Indonesia) W A Prasetyo	21	21	19
(China) Ma S (China) Shen XY	23	17	21

Quarter-finals
Q1	(Chinese Taipei) Hung B-f (Chinese Taipei) Liu F-s	13	14
(China) Ma S (China) Shen XY	21	21

==== Section 2 ====
First round
4	(Chinese Taipei) Huang T-i (Chinese Taipei) Lin T-y	21	12	21
(Japan) S Inoue (Japan) Y Kida	11	21	12
Q2	(Chinese Taipei) Chen Y-a (Chinese Taipei) Lin Y-y	21	13	21
(Indonesia) T Aderya (Indonesia) D E Marvino	19	21	11
6	(Chinese Taipei) Wei C-w (Chinese Taipei) Yang P-c	21	21
(Japan) N Kawashima (Japan) K Ogawa	14	17
(Canada) L Y Chung (Canada) H L Wong	7	10
(Thailand) C Piboon (Thailand) T Punpanich	21	21

Second round
4	(Chinese Taipei) Huang T-i (Chinese Taipei) Lin T-y	19	19
Q2	(Chinese Taipei) Chen Y-a (Chinese Taipei) Lin Y-y	21	21
6	(Chinese Taipei) Wei C-w (Chinese Taipei) Yang P-c	10	21
(Thailand) C Piboon (Thailand) T Punpanich	21	23

Quarter-finals
Q2	(Chinese Taipei) Chen Y-a (Chinese Taipei) Lin Y-y	21	22	21
(Thailand) C Piboon (Thailand) T Punpanich	23	20	14

=== Bottom half ===
==== Section 3 ====
First round
(Macau) Pui C C (Macau) Pui P F	18	11
Q4	(Malaysia) E Oh (Malaysia) Too M Y	21	21
(Chinese Taipei) Huang K-y (Chinese Taipei) Lin S-m	21	15	17
5	(Japan) H Kawabe (Japan) K Matsukawa	11	21	21
(China) Chen ZG (China) Zhang LJ	17	15
PFQ	(China) Lin YF (China) Yang JY	21	21
(Japan) S Mezaki (Japan) Y Oku	21	21
3	(Indonesia) A Prasetya (Indonesia) P Ramadhan	17	11

Second round
Q4	(Malaysia) E Oh (Malaysia) Too M Y	16	17
5	(Japan) H Kawabe (Japan) K Matsukawa	21	21
PFQ	(China) Lin YF (China) Yang JY	17	17
(Japan) S Mezaki (Japan) Y Oku	21	21

Quarter-finals
5	(Japan) H Kawabe (Japan) K Matsukawa	21	14	17
(Japan) S Mezaki (Japan) Y Oku	15	21	21

==== Section 4 ====
First round
(Chinese Taipei) Chen Y-c (Chinese Taipei) Chen Z-r	21	14	19
(Thailand) W Phakjarung (Thailand) T Viriyangkura	10	21	21
(Chinese Taipei) Bao Xin D G L W (Chinese Taipei) Chiang C-w	17	17
7	(China) Chen YR (China) Chen ZH	21	21
(Chinese Taipei) Chen S-f (Chinese Taipei) Chiu S-h	21	21	21
(Japan) T Goto (Japan) T Yoshida	18	23	17
(China) Xu HY (China) Yang JZ	12	15
2	(Chinese Taipei) Lin C-y (Chinese Taipei) Lin Y-s	21	21

Second round
(Thailand) W Phakjarung (Thailand) T Viriyangkura	21	21
7	(China) Chen YR (China) Chen ZH	19	18
(Chinese Taipei) Chen S-f (Chinese Taipei) Chiu S-h	21	21
2	(Chinese Taipei) Lin C-y (Chinese Taipei) Lin Y-s	17	10

Quarter-finals
(Thailand) W Phakjarung (Thailand) T Viriyangkura	19	14
(Chinese Taipei) Chen S-f (Chinese Taipei) Chiu S-h	21	21

== Women's doubles ==
=== Seeds ===
1. (Chinese Taipei) Chen Yu-hsuan / Liu Chiao-yun (quarter-finals)
2. (Chinese Taipei) Chou Yun-an / Sung Yi-hsuan (second round)
3. (Chinese Taipei) Chung Chia-en / Wang You-zhu (first round)
4. (Malaysia) Low Zi Yu / Noraqilah Maisarah (final)
5. (China) Wang Yiduo / Wang Zimeng (semi-finals)
6. (Malaysia) Cheng Su Hui / Teoh Mei Xing (quarter-finals)
7. (China) Liu Jiayue / Li Huazhou (second round)
8. (China) Huang Kexin / Liang Yuen (quarter-finals)

=== Finals ===
Semi-finals
(China) Wu Jiashu (China) Yang Jiayi	6	13
(Japan) Sumire Nakade (Japan) Miyu Takahashi	21	21
4	(Malaysia) Low Zi Yu (Malaysia) Noraqilah Maisarah	21	21
5	(China) Wang Yiduo (China) Wang Zimeng	19	18

Final
(Japan) Sumire Nakade (Japan) Miyu Takahashi	21	21
4	(Malaysia) Low Zi Yu (Malaysia) Noraqilah Maisarah	13	17

=== Top half ===
==== Section 1 ====
First round
1	(Chinese Taipei) Chen Y-h (Chinese Taipei) Liu C-y	16	21	21
(China) Zhou JQ (China) Zhou JR	21	15	13
(China) Liao LX (China) Shen SY	13	21	21
(Hong Kong) Hung H Y (Hong Kong) Wong Y L	21	9	8
7	(China) Li HZ (China) Liu JY	22	21	21
(Hong Kong) A Chen (Hong Kong) Yu Y K	24	12	16
(China) Wu JS (China) Yang JY	21	21
(England) Lam C W (Malaysia) Sim J M	7	17

Second round
1	(Chinese Taipei) Chen Y-h (Chinese Taipei) Liu C-y	14	21	21
(China) Liao LX (China) Shen SY	21	18	18
7	(China) Li HZ (China) Liu JY	21	19	19
(China) Wu JS (China) Yang JY	8	21	21

Quarter-finals
1	(Chinese Taipei) Chen Y-h (Chinese Taipei) Liu C-y	26	22
(China) Wu JS (China) Yang JY	28	24

==== Section 2 ====
First round
3	(Chinese Taipei) Chung C-e (Chinese Taipei) Wang Y-z	20	21	14
Q4	(China) Lin ZQ (China) Zhong DT	22	18	21
(Japan) S Nakade (Japan) M Takahashi	21	21
Q3	(China) Li WZ (China) Ren HJ	15	15
6	(Malaysia) Cheng S H (Malaysia) Teoh M X	19	21	21
(Individual Neutral Athletes) A Boiarun (Individual Neutral Athletes) D Kharlampovich	21	13	14
(Chinese Taipei) Chen Y-t (Chinese Taipei) Lai Y-j	17	21	17
Q1	(China) Liu ZY (China) Zeng ZX	21	18	21

Second round
Q4	(China) Lin ZQ (China) Zhong DT	16	22	10
(Japan) S Nakade (Japan) M Takahashi	21	20	21
6	(Malaysia) Cheng S H (Malaysia) Teoh M X	21	15	21
Q1	(China) Liu ZY (China) Zeng ZX	10	21	12

Quarter-finals
(Japan) S Nakade (Japan) M Takahashi	21	21
6	(Malaysia) Cheng S H (Malaysia) Teoh M X	9	11

=== Bottom half ===
==== Section 3 ====
First round
(Chinese Taipei) Han Y-c (Chinese Taipei) Yeh J-t	14	12
(China) Li XR (China) Qin SY	21	21
(Chinese Taipei) Chen H-y (Chinese Taipei) Wang Y-y	12	14
8	(China) Huang KX (China) Liang YE	21	21
(Chinese Taipei) Hung H-e (Chinese Taipei) Wang L-h	14	13
(China) Chen SY (China) Rong SC	21	21
(Japan) T Harima (Japan) Y Imai	16	21	12
4	(Malaysia) Low Z Y (Malaysia) N Maisarah	21	19	21

Second round
(China) Li XR (China) Qin SY	10	13
8	(China) Huang KX (China) Liang YE	21	21
(China) Chen SY (China) Rong SC	17	17
4	(Malaysia) Low Z Y (Malaysia) N Maisarah	21	21

Quarter-finals
8	(China) Huang KX (China) Liang YE	14	21	15
4	(Malaysia) Low Z Y (Malaysia) N Maisarah	21	16	21

==== Section 4 ====
First round
Q2	(Chinese Taipei) Liang T-y (Chinese Taipei) Lin J-y	19	21	19
(China) Hu SH (China) Sun XL	21	19	21
(Chinese Taipei) Chang Y-j (Chinese Taipei) Lin Y-y	7	14
5	(China) Wang YD (China) Wang ZM	21	21
(Macau) Ng W C (Macau) Pui C W	15	15
(China) Ding KY (China) Fu XY	21	21
(Chinese Taipei) Hsieh M-y (Chinese Taipei) Yu C-h	22	12	14
2	(Chinese Taipei) Chou Y-a (Chinese Taipei) Sung Y-h	20	21	21

Second round
(China) Hu SH (China) Sun XL	15	11
5	(China) Wang YD (China) Wang ZM	21	21
(China) Ding KY (China) Fu XY	23	15	21
2	(Chinese Taipei) Chou Y-a (Chinese Taipei) Sung Y-h	21	21	17

Quarter-finals
5	(China) Wang YD (China) Wang ZM	18	22	21
(China) Ding KY (China) Fu XY	21	20	10

== Mixed doubles ==
=== Seeds ===
1. (Indonesia) Bimo Prasetyo / Thesya Munggaran (semi-finals)
2. (Indonesia) M Nawaf Khoiriyansyah / Nahya Muhyifa (second round)
3. (Hong Kong) Chan Yin Chak / Ng Tsz Yau (final)
4. (Malaysia) Liew Xun / Ho Lo Ee (second round)
5. (China) Li Hongyi / Huang Kexin (quarter-finals)
6. (Chinese Taipei) Lu Ming-che / Chou Yun-an (second round)
7. (Malaysia) Datu Anif Isaac Datu Asrah / Clarissa San (second round)
8. (Malaysia) Beh Chun Meng / (England) Karen Feng (first round)

=== Finals ===
Semi-finals
1	(Indonesia) Bimo Prasetyo (Indonesia) Thesya Munggaran	21	18	11
3	(Hong Kong) Chan Yin Chak (Hong Kong) Ng Tsz Yau	15	21	21
Q4	(China) Ma Xixiang (China) Qin Huizhi	23	20	21
(China) Shen Xuanyao (China) Tang Ruizhi	21	22	16

Final
3	(Hong Kong) Chan Yin Chak (Hong Kong) Ng Tsz Yau	23	19
Q4	(China) Ma Xixiang (China) Qin Huizhi	25	21

=== Top half ===
==== Section 1 ====
First round
1	(Indonesia) B Prasetyo (Indonesia) T Munggaran	21	21
(Chinese Taipei) Lin Y-y (Chinese Taipei) Hsieh M-y	12	15
Q2	(Japan) K Ogawa (Japan) T Harima	25	15
(Malaysia) Loh Z H (Malaysia) N Tan	27	21
7	(Malaysia) D Datu Asrah (Malaysia) C San	21	21
(Macau) Leong I C (Macau) Ng W C	18	15
(Chinese Taipei) Chen B-y (Chinese Taipei) Sung Y-h	21	21
(Thailand) Tonk Saeheng (Thailand) Tonr Saeheng	14	13

Second round
1	(Indonesia) B Prasetyo (Indonesia) T Munggaran	21	21
(Malaysia) Loh Z H (Malaysia) N Tan	12	16
7	(Malaysia) D Datu Asrah (Malaysia) C San	21	18	3^{r}
(Chinese Taipei) Chen B-y (Chinese Taipei) Sung Y-h	17	21	6

Quarter-finals
1	(Indonesia) B Prasetyo (Indonesia) T Munggaran	21	21
(Chinese Taipei) Chen B-y (Chinese Taipei) Sung Y-h	19	18

==== Section 2 ====
First round
3	(Hong Kong) Chan Y C (Hong Kong) Ng T Y	21	21
Q3	(China) Xue ZY (China) Zhang KX	10	13
(Hong Kong) Ko S H (Hong Kong) Hung H Y	19	21	13
(China) Liao PY (China) Zhang JH	21	9	21
8	(Malaysia) Beh C M (England) K Feng	21	18	7
(England) Wang Y H (England) Lam C W	18	21	21
(Hong Kong) Lee C H (Hong Kong) Wong Y L	22	13
(Malaysia) Wee Y H (Malaysia) V Gobi	24	21

Second round
3	(Hong Kong) Chan Y C (Hong Kong) Ng T Y	21	21
(China) Liao PY (China) Zhang JH	16	16
(England) Wang Y H (England) Lam C W	12	11
(Malaysia) Wee Y H (Malaysia) V Gobi	21	21

Quarter-finals
3	(Hong Kong) Chan Y C (Hong Kong) Ng T Y	21	21
(Malaysia) Wee Y H (Malaysia) V Gobi	12	16

=== Bottom half ===
==== Section 3 ====
First round
(Chinese Taipei) Cheng K-w (Chinese Taipei) Lin C-y	21	21
(Chinese Taipei) Yang P-c (Chinese Taipei) Lai Y-j	15	19
(China) Ma S (China) Wang YD	15	13
5	(China) Li HY (China) Huang KX	21	21
Q4	(China) Ma XX (China) Qin HZ	21	21
(China) Wang XK (China) Ren HJ	16	19
(Malaysia) Par T A (Venezuela) J Z Gabriela	16	16
4	(Malaysia) Liew X (Malaysia) Ho L E	21	21

Second round
(Chinese Taipei) Cheng K-w (Chinese Taipei) Lin C-y	14	16
5	(China) Li HY (China) Huang KX	21	21
Q4	(China) Ma XX (China) Qin HZ	21	22
4	(Malaysia) Liew X (Malaysia) Ho L E	19	20

Quarter-finals
5	(China) Li HY (China) Huang KX	19	22
Q4	(China) Ma XX (China) Qin HZ	21	24

==== Section 4 ====
First round
(China) Shen XY (China) Tang RZ	21	21
(Chinese Taipei) Lu C (Chinese Taipei) Lin Y-y	16	15
(Hong Kong) Cheung S S (Hong Kong) Chu W C	16	9
6	(Chinese Taipei) Lu M-c (Chinese Taipei) Chou Y-a	21	21
Q1	(Hong Kong) Cheng Y K (Hong Kong) Au Yeung W C	15	11
(Malaysia) Too M Y (Malaysia) Lee Y S	21	21
(Chinese Taipei) Chen Y-c (Chinese Taipei) Liao Y-c	13	10
2	(Indonesia) M N Khoiriyansyah (Indonesia) N Muhyifa	21	21

Second round
(China) Shen XY (China) Tang RZ	13	21	21
6	(Chinese Taipei) Lu M-c (Chinese Taipei) Chou Y-a	21	16	15
(Malaysia) Too M Y (Malaysia) Lee Y S	21	21
2	(Indonesia) M N Khoiriyansyah (Indonesia) N Muhyifa	18	18

Quarter-finals
(China) Shen XY (China) Tang RZ	22	21
(Malaysia) Too M Y (Malaysia) Lee Y S	20	15

Preceded by 2026 Orléans Masters	BWF World Tour; 2026 BWF season	Succeeded by 2026 Malaysia Masters
