= Riku Hatano =

Japanese badminton player (born 2001)

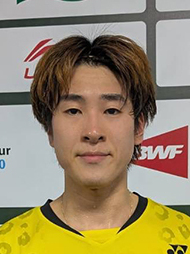
- Hatano in 2026

Personal information
- Born: 19 June 2001 (age 25) Hokkaido Prefecture, Japan
- Height: 1.80 m (5 ft 11 in)
- Weight: 73 kg (161 lb)

Sport
- Country: Japan
- Sport: Badminton
- Handedness: Right
- Coached by: Hengky Irawan (Tonami)

Men's singles
- Career record: 143 wins, 71 losses (66.82%)
- Highest ranking: 39 (8 July 2025)
- Current ranking: 86 (17 November 2026)
- BWF profile
Medal record
Men's badminton
Representing Japan
Thomas Cup
Bronze medal – third place	2022 Bangkok	Men's team
Asian Junior Championships
Silver medal – second place	2018 Jakarta	Mixed team

Riku Hatano (秦野 陸, Hatano Riku; born 19 June 2001) is a Japanese badminton player who competes in singles. He reached a career-high ranking of world No. 39. He is a former member of the Japanese national team (2021-2024) and has been a member of the Tonami Transportation team since 1 April 2020. Hatano won his first international title at the 2022 Slovak Open and was part of the Japanese squad that won a bronze medal at the 2022 Thomas Cup.

== Early career ==
Riku Hatano began playing badminton at the age of seven in Memuro, Hokkaido. He attended Obihiro Daiichi Junior High School and Saitama Sakae High School. While at Saitama Sakae High School, he won the boys' singles title at the 2018 All Japan Junior Badminton Championships (JOC Junior Olympic Cup). He was also the singles runner-up at the National High School Invitational Tournament in both 2018 and 2019.

On the international junior circuit, Hatano was a member of the Japanese team that won a silver medal at the 2018 Asian Junior Championships. In individual competition that year, he reached the fourth round of the World Junior Championships and was a boys' doubles runner-up at the Banthongyord Junior International with Takuma Kawamoto.

== Career ==
Hatano began competing in senior-level tournaments in late 2019 while still in high school. He joined the Tonami Transportation badminton team in April 2020 and was selected for the Japanese national B team for the first time in 2021.

In 2022, Hatano won his first senior international titles at the Slovak Open by defeating Chi Yu-jen in the final. He then won the 2022 Réunion Open over his compatriot, Yushi Tanaka. He also finished as the runner-up to Tanaka at the North Harbour International. He was also a member of the Japanese squad that secured a bronze medal at the 2022 Thomas Cup.

He made his BWF World Tour debut at the 2023 Thailand Masters. In 2024, Hatano was selected as a sparring partner for the Japanese team for the Paris Olympics. He later finished as the runner-up in two International Challenge tournaments: the Malaysia International, where he was defeated by Minoru Koga, and the Indonesia International, where he lost to Koo Takahashi. On 8 July 2025, he achieved a career-high ranking of world No. 39.

In August 2026, Hatano won the Singapore International, defeating South Korea's Park Sang-yong in the final.

== Achievements ==
=== BWF International Challenge/Series (3 titles, 3 runners-up) ===
Men's singles
Year	Tournament	Opponent	Score	Result	Ref.
2022	Slovak Open	(Chinese Taipei) Chi Yu-jen	21–17, 21–15	(gold) Winner	
2022	Réunion Open	(Japan) Yushi Tanaka	21–16, 21–17	(gold) Winner	
2022	North Harbour International	(Japan) Yushi Tanaka	13–21, 18–21	(silver) Runner-up	
2024	Malaysia International	(Japan) Minoru Koga	19–21, 21–15, 11–21	(silver) Runner-up	
2024 (II)	Indonesia International	(Japan) Koo Takahashi	18–21, 11–21	(silver) Runner-up	
2026	Singapore International	(South Korea) Park Sang-yong	21–16, 14–21, 21–8	(gold) Winner	

BWF International Challenge tournament
BWF Future Series tournament

=== BWF Junior International (1 runner-up) ===
Boys' doubles
Year	Tournament	Partner	Opponent	Score	Result	Ref.
2018	Banthongyord Junior International	(Japan) Takuma Kawamoto	(China) Liang Weikeng (China) Shang Yichen	21–18, 16–21, 11–21	(silver) Runner-up	

BWF Junior International Challenge tournament

== Performance timeline ==
Key

W	Won	F	Finalist	SF	Semi-finalist
QF	Quarter-finalist	#R	Rounds 4, 3, 2, 1	RR	Round-robin stage
Q#	Qualification round	A	Absent	w/d	Withdrew
G	Gold	S	Silver	B	Bronze
NH	Not held	N/A	Not applicable	DNQ	Did not qualify

=== National team ===
- Junior level

Team events	2018	Ref.
Asian Junior Championships	S	

- Senior level

Team events	2022	Ref.
Asia Team Championships	RR	
Thomas Cup	B	

=== Individual competitions ===
- Junior level

Events	2018	Ref.
Asian Junior Championships	3R	
World Junior Championships	4R	

- Senior level

Tournament	BWF World Tour				Best	Ref.
Tournament	2023	2024	2025	2026	Best	Ref.
Thailand Masters	1R	A			1R ('23)	
German Open	A		1R	A	1R ('25)	
Swiss Open	A		2R	A	2R ('25)	
Orléans Masters	A		Q1	A	Q1('25)	
Ruichang China Masters	A			2R	2R ('26)	
Baoji China Masters	A			SF	SF ('26)	
Thailand Open	A		Q2	A	Q2('25)	
Macau Open	NH	QF	A		QF ('24)	
U.S. Open	1R	A			1R ('23)	
Canada Open	A		QF	QF	QF ('25, '26)	
Taipei Open	A		1R	A	1R ('25)	
Korea Masters	2R	QF	1R	A	QF ('24)	
Indonesia Masters Super 100	1R	SF	1R	A	SF ('24)	
Indonesia Masters Super 100	QF	A		QF	SF ('24)	
Vietnam Open	2R	A	3R	A	3R ('25)	
Malaysia Super 100	A	SF	A		SF ('24)	
Japan Masters	Q2	Q1	Q2	Q1	Q2 ('23, '25)	
Kaohsiung Masters	1R	A			1R ('23)	
Syed Modi International	A			Q	('26)	
Year-end ranking	86	49	116		49	
Tournament	2023	2024	2025	2026	Best	Ref.

== Record against selected opponents ==
Record against Year-end Finals finalists, World Championships semi-finalists, and Olympic quarter-finalists. Accurate as of 5 July 2025.

Player	M	W	L	Diff.
(Denmark) Viktor Axelsen	1	0	1	–1
(France) Alex Lanier	1	1	0	+1
(India) Lakshya Sen	1	0	1	–1
(Japan) Kodai Naraoka	2	0	2	–2

Player	M	W	L	Diff.
(Malaysia) Lee Zii Jia	1	0	1	–1
(Singapore) Loh Kean Yew	1	0	1	–1
(Thailand) Kunlavut Vitidsarn	1	0	1	–1
