= Arjun M. R. =

Indian badminton player (born 1997)

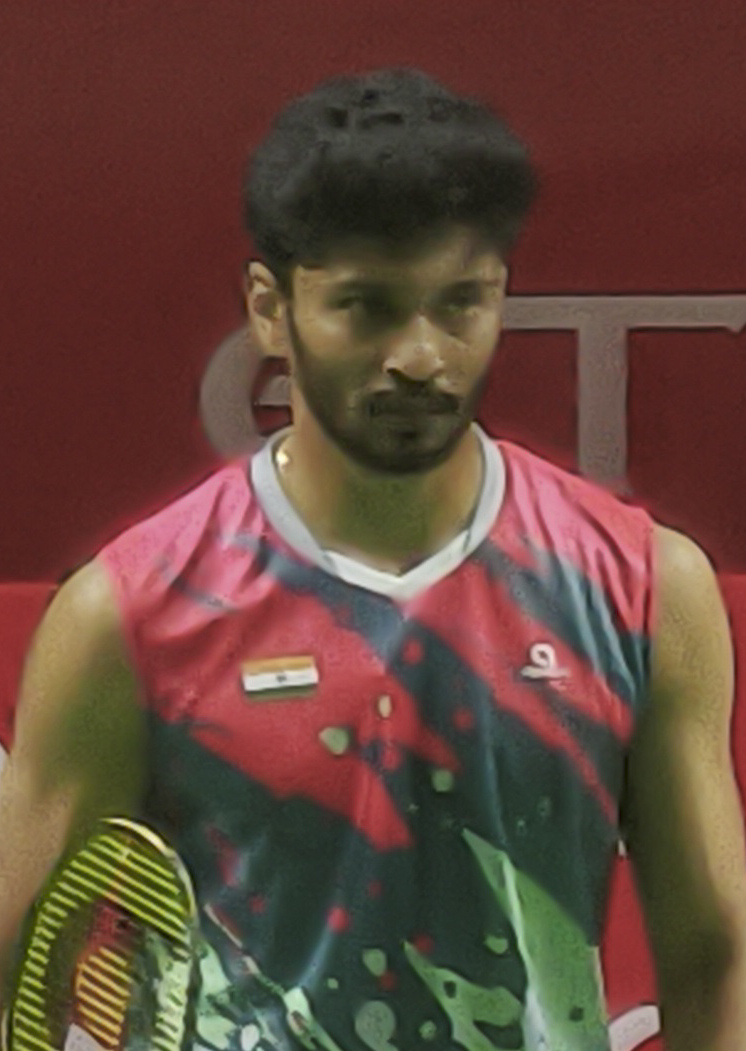
- Arjun at the 2026 Indonesia Open

Personal information
- Born: Arjun Madathil Ramachandran; 11 May 1997 (age 29) Kochi, Kerala, India
- Height: 1.72 m (5 ft 8 in)
- Spouse: Akhila Mohan (m. 2026)

Sport
- Country: India
- Sport: Badminton
- Handedness: Right

Men's & mixed doubles
- Highest ranking: 19 (MD with Dhruv Kapila, 25 October 2022); 41 (XD with K. Maneesha, 6 August 2019)
- Current ranking: 32 (MD with Hariharan Amsakarunan, 10 November 2026)
- BWF profile
Medal record
Men's badminton
Representing India
Thomas Cup
| Gold medal – first place | 2022 Bangkok | Men's team |
| Bronze medal – third place | 2026 Horsens | Men's team |
Asian Games
| Silver medal – second place | 2022 Hangzhou | Men's team |
| Bronze medal – third place | 2026 Aichi–Nagoya | Men's team |
Asia Team Championships
| Bronze medal – third place | 2020 Manila | Men's team |

Arjun Madathil Ramachandran (born 11 May 1997) is an Indian badminton player. He alongside India men's team won the 2022 Thomas Cup, and also bronze medal at the 2020 Asia Team Championships.

== Career ==
Arjun began playing badminton at the age of nine at FACT club in 2008, and he moved to the badminton academy at the Regional Sports Centre in Kadavanthra three years later. He was introduced to playing doubles by his coach M. Mohanachandran, and within a year he had completely shifted his focus to doubles. He has featured in the Kerala team since 2012.

== Achievements ==
=== BWF World Tour (1 title, 1 runner-up) ===
The BWF World Tour, which was announced on 19 March 2017 and implemented in 2018, is a series of elite badminton tournaments sanctioned by the Badminton World Federation (BWF). The BWF World Tour is divided into levels of World Tour Finals, Super 1000, Super 750, Super 500, Super 300, and the BWF Tour Super 100.

Men's doubles
| Year | Tournament | Level | Partner | Opponent | Score | Result |
|---|---|---|---|---|---|---|
| 2025 | Al Ain Masters | Super 100 | (India) Hariharan Amsakarunan | (Indonesia) Raymond Indra (Indonesia) Nikolaus Joaquin | 21–17, 21–18 | (gold) Winner |

Mixed doubles
| Year | Tournament | Level | Partner | Opponent | Score | Result |
|---|---|---|---|---|---|---|
| 2022 | Odisha Open | Super 100 | (India) Treesa Jolly | (Sri Lanka) Sachin Dias (Sri Lanka) Thilini Hendahewa | 16–21, 20–22 | (silver) Runner-up |

=== BWF International Challenge/Series (14 titles, 6 runners-up) ===
Men's doubles
| Year | Tournament | Partner | Opponent | Score | Result |
|---|---|---|---|---|---|
| 2016 | Tata Open India International | (India) Ramchandran Shlok | (India) Satwiksairaj Rankireddy (India) Chirag Shetty | 12–10, 9–11, 7–11, 5–11 | (silver) Runner-up |
| 2016 | Nepal International | (India) Ramchandran Shlok | (Pakistan) Rizwan Azam (Pakistan) Sulehri Kashif Ali | 21–18, 21–15 | (gold) Winner |
| 2017 | Iran Fajr International | (India) Ramchandran Shlok | (Indonesia) Kenas Adi Haryanto (Indonesia) Muhammad Reza Pahlevi Isfahani | 11–8, 11–8, 11–9 | (gold) Winner |
| 2017 | Ethiopia International | (India) Ramchandran Shlok | (Jordan) Bahaedeen Ahmad Alshannik (Jordan) Mohd Naser Mansour Nayef | 21–7, 21–19 | (gold) Winner |
| 2018 | Hellas Open | (India) Ramchandran Shlok | (Poland) Adrian Dziółko (Poland) Michał Rogalski | 21–13, 21–11 | (gold) Winner |
| 2018 | Tata Open India International | (India) B. Sumeeth Reddy | (Malaysia) Goh Sze Fei (Malaysia) Nur Izzuddin | 21–10, 21–16 | (gold) Winner |
| 2019 | Ghana International | (India) Ramchandran Shlok | (Nigeria) Godwin Olofua (Nigeria) Anuoluwapo Juwon Opeyori | 21–11, 21–12 | (gold) Winner |
| 2019 | Lagos International | (India) Ramchandran Shlok | (Germany) Jones Ralfy Jansen (Germany) Peter Käsbauer | 11–21, 8–21 | (silver) Runner-up |
| 2019 | Nepal International | (India) Dhruv Kapila | (India) Manu Attri (India) B. Sumeeth Reddy | 19–21, 15–21 | (silver) Runner-up |
| 2019 | Bangladesh International | (India) Dhruv Kapila | (Malaysia) Chang Yee Jun (Malaysia) Tee Kai Wun | 19–21, 16–21 | (silver) Runner-up |
| 2022 (I) | India International | (India) Dhruv Kapila | (Thailand) Chaloempon Charoenkitamorn (Thailand) Nanthakarn Yordphaisong | 21–17, 20–22, 21–18 | (gold) Winner |
| 2024 | Uganda International | (India) Dhruv Kapila | (United States) Vinson Chiu (United States) Joshua Yuan | 21–14, 21–13 | (gold) Winner |
| 2024 | Polish Open | (India) Dhruv Kapila | (Denmark) William Kryger Boe (Denmark) Christian Faust Kjær | 15–21, 23–21, 21–19 | (gold) Winner |
| 2024 (I) | India International | (India) Vishnu Goud Panjala | (India) Pruthvi Roy (India) Sai Pratheek K. | 19–21, 17–21 | (silver) Runner-up |
| 2025 | Iran Fajr International | (India) Vishnu Goud Panjala | (United Arab Emirates) Dev Ayyappan (United Arab Emirates) Dhiren Ayyappan | 21–16, 21–17 | (gold) Winner |
| 2025 | Turkey International | (India) Hariharan Amsakarunan | (Japan) Yuto Noda (Japan) Shunya Ota | 21–13, 21–6 | (gold) Winner |
| 2025 (II) | India International | (India) Hariharan Amsakarunan | (Thailand) Pharanyu Kaosamaang (Thailand) Tanadon Punpanich | 21–14, 21–14 | (gold) Winner |

Mixed doubles
| Year | Tournament | Partner | Opponent | Score | Result |
|---|---|---|---|---|---|
| 2018 | Hellas Open | (India) K. Maneesha | (Poland) Paweł Pietryja (Poland) Agnieszka Wojtkowska | 21–15, 21–14 | (gold) Winner |
| 2019 | Ghana International | (India) K. Maneesha | (India) Ramchandran Shlok (India) Rutaparna Panda | 19–21, 15–21 | (silver) Runner-up |
| 2019 | Lagos International | (India) K. Maneesha | (India) Ramchandran Shlok (India) Rutaparna Panda | 21–16, 21–17 | (gold) Winner |

BWF International Challenge tournament
BWF International Series tournament
BWF Future Series tournament

=== BWF Junior International (5 titles, 1 runners-up) ===
Boys' doubles
| Year | Tournament | Partner | Opponent | Score | Result |
|---|---|---|---|---|---|
| 2013 | India Junior International | (India) Chirag Shetty | (India) Aditya Joshi (India) Arun George | 17–21, 12–21 | (silver) Runner-up |
| 2014 | India Junior International | (India) Chirag Shetty | (India) Satwiksairaj Rankireddy (India) Krishna Prasad Garaga | 11–7, 11–10, 11–6 | (gold) Winner |
| 2014 | Belgian Junior International | (India) Chirag Shetty | (Scotland) Alexander Dunn (Scotland) Adam Hall | 9–11, 11–2, 11–7 | (gold) Winner |
| 2014 | Swiss Junior International | (India) Chirag Shetty | (England) Ben Lane (England) Sean Vendy | 11–7, 11–8, 11–7 | (gold) Winner |

Mixed doubles
| Year | Tournament | Partner | Opponent | Score | Result |
|---|---|---|---|---|---|
| 2014 | India Junior International | (India) Kuhoo Garg | (India) Chirag Shetty (India) Shruthi K.P | 11–8, 11–7, 5–11, 11–8 | (gold) Winner |
| 2014 | Swiss Junior International | (India) Kuhoo Garg | (Germany) Bjarne Geiss (Germany) Yvonne Li | 11–7, 11–7, 11–10 | (gold) Winner |

BWF Junior International Grand Prix tournament
BWF Junior International Challenge tournament
BWF Junior International Series tournament
BWF Junior Future Series tournament
