= Hariharan Amsakarunan =

Indian badminton player (born 2003)

Personal information
- Born: 18 May 2003 (age 23)

Sport
- Country: India
- Sport: Badminton
- Event: Men's & mixed doubles

Men's & mixed doubles
- BWF profile (archived)
- Updated on 3 October 2026

Hariharan Amsakarunan (born 18 May 2003) is an Indian badminton player who competes in men's doubles and mixed doubles. He was a member of the Indian men's squad that won the bronze medal in the team event at the 2026 Asian Games.

== Early life ==
Amsakarunan hails from Mannargudi in the Tiruvarur district of Tamil Nadu. He was initially inspired to take up the sport by his elder sister Deepika, who was also a competitive badminton player. Facing early financial constraints, he initially trained with plastic shuttlecocks before securing institutional support through the Tamil Nadu state government's elite athlete assistance programmes. After beginning his formal coaching in Coimbatore, he moved to Hyderabad in 2022 to train at the Gopichand Badminton Academy.

== Career ==
Hariharan has partnered with M. R. Arjun in men's doubles and Treesa Jolly in mixed doubles.

At the Türkiye International in Istanbul in 2025, Hariharan won both the men's doubles title with M. R. Arjun and the mixed doubles title with Treesa Jolly.

Hariharan was a member of the Indian men's badminton team that won the bronze medal at the 2026 Asian Games.

== Achievements ==
=== Asian Games ===
Men's team

Year	Venue	Event	Opponents in semi-final	Score	Result
2026	Ichinomiya City Municipal Gymnasium, Aichi, Japan	Men's team	China	1–3	(bronze) Bronze

=== BWF International Challenge/Series (5 titles, 2 runners-up) ===
Men's doubles
Year	Tournament	Level	Partner	Opponent	Score	Result
2023	Mauritius International	International Series	(India) Ruban Kumar Rethinasabapathi	(Japan) Daisuke Sano (Japan) Shogo Ogawa	17–21, 16–21	(silver) Runner-up
2024	Bendigo International	International Challenge	(India) Ruban Kumar Rethinasabapathi	(Chinese Taipei) Chen Cheng-kuan (Chinese Taipei) Po Li-wei	17–21, 14–21	(silver) Runner-up
2025	St Denis Réunion Open	International Challenge	(India) Ruban Kumar Rethinasabapathi	(France) Mael Cattoen (France) Lucas Renoir	21–12, 21–11	(gold) Winner
2025	Türkiye International	International Challenge	(India) Arjun M. R.	(Japan) Yuto Noda (Japan) Shunya Ota	21–13, 21–6	(gold) Winner
2025	India International II	International Challenge	(India) Arjun M. R.	(Thailand) Pharanyu Kaosamaang (Thailand) Tanadon Punpanich	21–14, 21–14	(gold) Winner

Mixed doubles
Year	Tournament	Level	Partner	Opponent	Score	Result
2023	Mauritius International	International Series	(India) Varshini Viswanath Sri	(Mauritius) Julien Paul (Mauritius) Kate Ludik	21–19, 21–17	(gold) Winner
2025	Türkiye International	International Challenge	(India) Treesa Jolly	(Indonesia) M. Nawaf Khoiriyansyah (Indonesia) Nahya Muhyifa	21–14, 18–21, 21–11	(gold) Winner

BWF International Challenge tournament
BWF International Series tournament
