= Japan Masters =

Annual badminton tournament in Japan

- Official website
- Founded: 2023; 3 years ago
- Editions: 4 (2026)
- Location: Kumamoto; Japan
- Venue: Kumamoto Prefectural Gymnasium (2026)
- Prize money: US$500,000 (2026)

Men's
- Draw: 32S / 32D
- Current champions: Lakshya Sen (singles); Aaron Tai; Yap Roy King (doubles)
- Most singles titles: 1, all winners
- Most doubles titles: 1, all winners

Women's
- Draw: 32S / 32D
- Current champions: Akane Yamaguchi (singles); Rin Iwanaga; Kie Nakanishi (doubles)
- Most singles titles: 2, Akane Yamaguchi
- Most doubles titles: 1, all winners

Mixed doubles
- Draw: 32
- Current champions: Jiang Zhenbang; Wei Yaxin
- Most titles (male): 2, Dechapol Puavaranukroh
- Most titles (female): 2, Supissara Paewsampran

Super 500
- Arctic Open; Australian Open; Hong Kong Open; Hylo Open; Indonesia Masters; Japan Masters; Korea Open; Malaysia Masters; Thailand Open

Last completed
- 2026 Japan Masters

The Japan Masters is an annual badminton tournament held in Japan. BWF categorised Japan Masters as one of the nine BWF World Tour Super 500 events in the BWF events. On 18 April 2022, the city of Kumamoto was confirmed to be the host of this tournament for the 2023–2026 BWF World Tour cycle.

== Winners ==
Year	Men's singles	Women's singles	Men's doubles	Women's doubles	Mixed doubles	Ref
2023	(Denmark) Viktor Axelsen	(Indonesia) Gregoria Mariska Tunjung	(China) He Jiting (China) Ren Xiangyu	(China) Zhang Shuxian (China) Zheng Yu	(China) Zheng Siwei (China) Huang Yaqiong	
2024	(China) Li Shifeng	(Japan) Akane Yamaguchi	(Indonesia) Fajar Alfian (Indonesia) Muhammad Rian Ardianto	(China) Liu Shengshu (China) Tan Ning	(Thailand) Dechapol Puavaranukroh (Thailand) Supissara Paewsampran	
2025	(Japan) Kodai Naraoka	(Thailand) Ratchanok Intanon	(South Korea) Kim Won-ho (South Korea) Seo Seung-jae	(Malaysia) Pearly Tan (Malaysia) Thinaah Muralitharan	(Thailand) Dechapol Puavaranukroh (Thailand) Supissara Paewsampran	
2026	(India) Lakshya Sen	(Japan) Akane Yamaguchi	(Malaysia) Aaron Tai (Malaysia) Yap Roy King	(Japan) Rin Iwanaga (Japan) Kie Nakanishi	(China) Jiang Zhenbang (China) Wei Yaxin	

== Performances by nation ==
As of the 2026 edition

Rank	Nation	MS	WS	MD	WD	XD	Total
1	China	1		1	2	2	6
2	Japan*	1	2		1		4
3	Thailand		1			2	3
4	Indonesia		1	1			2
4	Malaysia			1	1		2
6	Denmark	1					1
6	India	1					1
6	South Korea			1			1
Total		4	4	4	4	4	20

* Host nation

== Records and statistics ==
As of the 2026 edition

=== Most titles ===
Only players who have won at least two Japan Masters titles are listed. In doubles events, titles are counted individually for each player.

Rank	Player	Event	Titles	Years
1	(Thailand) Dechapol Puavaranukroh	Mixed doubles	2	2024, 2025
1	(Thailand) Supissara Paewsampran	Mixed doubles	2	2024, 2025
1	(Japan) Akane Yamaguchi	Women's singles	2	2024, 2026

=== Consecutive titles ===
Only players or pairs who have won titles in at least two consecutive editions are listed.

Rank	Player(s)	Event	Consecutive titles	Years
1	(Thailand) Dechapol Puavaranukroh / Supissara Paewsampran	Mixed doubles	2	2024–2025

=== Youngest champions ===
The five youngest players to win a Japan Masters title are listed. Ages are calculated as of the date of the final. In doubles events, players are counted individually.

Rank	Player	Event	Age	Edition
1	(Malaysia) Aaron Tai	Men's doubles	20 years, 19 days	2026
2	(China) Liu Shengshu	Women's doubles	20 years, 223 days	2024
3	(China) Tan Ning	Women's doubles	21 years, 228 days	2024
4	(China) Zhang Shuxian	Women's doubles	23 years, 321 days	2023
5	(Indonesia) Gregoria Mariska Tunjung	Women's singles	24 years, 100 days	2023

=== Oldest champions ===
The five oldest players to win a Japan Masters title are listed. Ages are calculated as of the date of the final. In doubles events, players are counted individually.

Rank	Player	Event	Age	Edition
1	(Japan) Kie Nakanishi	Women's doubles	30 years, 326 days	2026
2	(Thailand) Ratchanok Intanon	Women's singles	30 years, 284 days	2025
3	(Denmark) Viktor Axelsen	Men's singles	29 years, 319 days	2023
4	(China) Huang Yaqiong	Mixed doubles	29 years, 264 days	2023
5	(Indonesia) Fajar Alfian	Men's doubles	29 years, 255 days	2024
