= 2026 BWF season =

Badminton World Federation circuit

Details
- Duration: 6 January – 13 December
- Edition: 20th
- Tournaments: TBD
- Categories: Grade 1 – (Individuals, Teams): 2; Grade 2 – BWF World Tour Finals: 1; Grade 2 – Super 1000: 4; Grade 2 – Super 750: 6; Grade 2 – Super 500: 9; Grade 2 – Super 300: 10; Grade 2 – Super 100: 10; Grade 3 – International Challenge: 21; Grade 3 – International Series: 15; Grade 3 – Future Series: 19; Continental Championships: 10; Multisport:

Achievements (singles)

Awards
- Player of the year: TBD

The 2026 BWF season is the overall badminton circuit organized by the Badminton World Federation (BWF) for the 2026 badminton season. The world badminton tournament in 2026 consists of:
1. BWF tournaments (Grade 1; Major Events)

- BWF World Team Championships (Thomas & Uber Cup)
- BWF World Championships

2. BWF World Tour (Grade 2)

- Level 1 (BWF World Tour Finals)
- Level 2 (BWF World Tour Super 1000)
- Level 3 (BWF World Tour Super 750)
- Level 4 (BWF World Tour Super 500)
- Level 5 (BWF World Tour Super 300)
- Level 6 (BWF Tour Super 100)

3. Continental Circuit (Grade 3) BWF Open Tournaments: BWF International Challenge, BWF International Series, and BWF Future Series.

The Thomas & Uber Cup is a team event. The others – Super 1000, Super 750, Super 500, Super 300, Super 100, International Challenge, International Series, and Future Series are all individual tournaments. The higher the level of tournament, the larger the prize money and the more ranking points available.

The 2026 BWF season calendar comprises these six levels of BWF tournaments.

== Schedule ==
This is the complete schedule of events on the 2026 calendar, with the champions and runners-up documented.

Key

World Championships
World Tour Finals
Super 1000
Super 750
Super 500
Super 300
Super 100
International Challenge
International Series
Future Series
Continental events/Team Events

=== January ===
| Week commencing | Tournament | Champions | Runners-up |
|---|---|---|---|
| 5 January | Malaysia Open (Draw): Dates: 6–11 January; Host: Kuala Lumpur, Malaysia; Venue: Axiata Arena; Level: Super 1000; Prize: $1,450,000; Format: 32MS/32WS/32MD/32WD/32XD | (Thailand) Kunlavut Vitidsarn | (China) Shi Yuqi |
| 5 January | Malaysia Open (Draw): Dates: 6–11 January; Host: Kuala Lumpur, Malaysia; Venue: Axiata Arena; Level: Super 1000; Prize: $1,450,000; Format: 32MS/32WS/32MD/32WD/32XD | Score: 23–21, 6–1 (retired) | |
| 5 January | Malaysia Open (Draw): Dates: 6–11 January; Host: Kuala Lumpur, Malaysia; Venue: Axiata Arena; Level: Super 1000; Prize: $1,450,000; Format: 32MS/32WS/32MD/32WD/32XD | (South Korea) An Se-young | (China) Wang Zhiyi |
| 5 January | Malaysia Open (Draw): Dates: 6–11 January; Host: Kuala Lumpur, Malaysia; Venue: Axiata Arena; Level: Super 1000; Prize: $1,450,000; Format: 32MS/32WS/32MD/32WD/32XD | Score: 21–15, 24–22 | |
| 5 January | Malaysia Open (Draw): Dates: 6–11 January; Host: Kuala Lumpur, Malaysia; Venue: Axiata Arena; Level: Super 1000; Prize: $1,450,000; Format: 32MS/32WS/32MD/32WD/32XD | (South Korea) Kim Won-ho (South Korea) Seo Seung-jae | (Malaysia) Aaron Chia (Malaysia) Soh Wooi Yik |
| 5 January | Malaysia Open (Draw): Dates: 6–11 January; Host: Kuala Lumpur, Malaysia; Venue: Axiata Arena; Level: Super 1000; Prize: $1,450,000; Format: 32MS/32WS/32MD/32WD/32XD | Score: 21–15, 12–21, 21–18 | |
| 5 January | Malaysia Open (Draw): Dates: 6–11 January; Host: Kuala Lumpur, Malaysia; Venue: Axiata Arena; Level: Super 1000; Prize: $1,450,000; Format: 32MS/32WS/32MD/32WD/32XD | (China) Liu Shengshu (China) Tan Ning | (South Korea) Baek Ha-na (South Korea) Lee So-hee |
| 5 January | Malaysia Open (Draw): Dates: 6–11 January; Host: Kuala Lumpur, Malaysia; Venue: Axiata Arena; Level: Super 1000; Prize: $1,450,000; Format: 32MS/32WS/32MD/32WD/32XD | Score: 21–18, 21–12 | |
| 5 January | Malaysia Open (Draw): Dates: 6–11 January; Host: Kuala Lumpur, Malaysia; Venue: Axiata Arena; Level: Super 1000; Prize: $1,450,000; Format: 32MS/32WS/32MD/32WD/32XD | (China) Feng Yanzhe (China) Huang Dongping | (China) Jiang Zhenbang (China) Wei Yaxin |
| 5 January | Malaysia Open (Draw): Dates: 6–11 January; Host: Kuala Lumpur, Malaysia; Venue: Axiata Arena; Level: Super 1000; Prize: $1,450,000; Format: 32MS/32WS/32MD/32WD/32XD | Score: 21–19, 21–19 | |
| 5 January | Estonian International: Dates: 8–11 January; Host: Tallinn, Estonia; Venue: Kalevi Spordihall; Level: International Series; Prize: $10,000; Format: 32MS/32WS/32MD/32WD/32XD | (Japan) Minoru Koga | (Denmark) Mads Christophersen |
| 5 January | Estonian International: Dates: 8–11 January; Host: Tallinn, Estonia; Venue: Kalevi Spordihall; Level: International Series; Prize: $10,000; Format: 32MS/32WS/32MD/32WD/32XD | Score: 21–18, 11–21, 21–12 | |
| 5 January | Estonian International: Dates: 8–11 January; Host: Tallinn, Estonia; Venue: Kalevi Spordihall; Level: International Series; Prize: $10,000; Format: 32MS/32WS/32MD/32WD/32XD | (India) Rujula Ramu | (Denmark) Frederikke Østergaard |
| 5 January | Estonian International: Dates: 8–11 January; Host: Tallinn, Estonia; Venue: Kalevi Spordihall; Level: International Series; Prize: $10,000; Format: 32MS/32WS/32MD/32WD/32XD | Score: 21–15, 21–13 | |
| 5 January | Estonian International: Dates: 8–11 January; Host: Tallinn, Estonia; Venue: Kalevi Spordihall; Level: International Series; Prize: $10,000; Format: 32MS/32WS/32MD/32WD/32XD | (Denmark) Christian Faust Kjær (Denmark) Rasmus Kjær | (France) Baptiste Labarthe (France) Quentin Ronget |
| 5 January | Estonian International: Dates: 8–11 January; Host: Tallinn, Estonia; Venue: Kalevi Spordihall; Level: International Series; Prize: $10,000; Format: 32MS/32WS/32MD/32WD/32XD | Score: 21–13, 21–12 | |
| 5 January | Estonian International: Dates: 8–11 January; Host: Tallinn, Estonia; Venue: Kalevi Spordihall; Level: International Series; Prize: $10,000; Format: 32MS/32WS/32MD/32WD/32XD | (Malaysia) Low Zi Yu (Malaysia) Noraqilah Maisarah | (United States) Audrey Chang (United States) Jasmine Yeung |
| 5 January | Estonian International: Dates: 8–11 January; Host: Tallinn, Estonia; Venue: Kalevi Spordihall; Level: International Series; Prize: $10,000; Format: 32MS/32WS/32MD/32WD/32XD | Score: 21–14, 21–19 | |
| 5 January | Estonian International: Dates: 8–11 January; Host: Tallinn, Estonia; Venue: Kalevi Spordihall; Level: International Series; Prize: $10,000; Format: 32MS/32WS/32MD/32WD/32XD | (Germany) Jonathan Dresp (Germany) Selin Hübsch | (Germany) Simon Krax (Germany) Amelie Lehmann |
| 5 January | Estonian International: Dates: 8–11 January; Host: Tallinn, Estonia; Venue: Kalevi Spordihall; Level: International Series; Prize: $10,000; Format: 32MS/32WS/32MD/32WD/32XD | Score: 21–14, 24–22 | |
| 12 January | India Open (Draw): Dates: 13–18 January; Host: New Delhi, India; Venue: Indira Gandhi Arena; Level: Super 750; Prize: $950,000; Format: 32MS/32WS/32MD/32WD/32XD | (Chinese Taipei) Lin Chun-yi | (Indonesia) Jonatan Christie |
| 12 January | India Open (Draw): Dates: 13–18 January; Host: New Delhi, India; Venue: Indira Gandhi Arena; Level: Super 750; Prize: $950,000; Format: 32MS/32WS/32MD/32WD/32XD | Score: 21–10, 21–18 | |
| 12 January | India Open (Draw): Dates: 13–18 January; Host: New Delhi, India; Venue: Indira Gandhi Arena; Level: Super 750; Prize: $950,000; Format: 32MS/32WS/32MD/32WD/32XD | (South Korea) An Se-young | (China) Wang Zhiyi |
| 12 January | India Open (Draw): Dates: 13–18 January; Host: New Delhi, India; Venue: Indira Gandhi Arena; Level: Super 750; Prize: $950,000; Format: 32MS/32WS/32MD/32WD/32XD | Score: 21-13, 21-11 | |
| 12 January | India Open (Draw): Dates: 13–18 January; Host: New Delhi, India; Venue: Indira Gandhi Arena; Level: Super 750; Prize: $950,000; Format: 32MS/32WS/32MD/32WD/32XD | (China) Liang Weikeng (China) Wang Chang | (Japan) Hiroki Midorikawa (Japan) Kyohei Yamashita |
| 12 January | India Open (Draw): Dates: 13–18 January; Host: New Delhi, India; Venue: Indira Gandhi Arena; Level: Super 750; Prize: $950,000; Format: 32MS/32WS/32MD/32WD/32XD | Score: 17–21, 25–23, 21–16 | |
| 12 January | India Open (Draw): Dates: 13–18 January; Host: New Delhi, India; Venue: Indira Gandhi Arena; Level: Super 750; Prize: $950,000; Format: 32MS/32WS/32MD/32WD/32XD | (China) Liu Shengshu (China) Tan Ning | (Japan) Yuki Fukushima (Japan) Mayu Matsumoto |
| 12 January | India Open (Draw): Dates: 13–18 January; Host: New Delhi, India; Venue: Indira Gandhi Arena; Level: Super 750; Prize: $950,000; Format: 32MS/32WS/32MD/32WD/32XD | Score: 21-11, 21-18 | |
| 12 January | India Open (Draw): Dates: 13–18 January; Host: New Delhi, India; Venue: Indira Gandhi Arena; Level: Super 750; Prize: $950,000; Format: 32MS/32WS/32MD/32WD/32XD | (Thailand) Dechapol Puavaranukroh (Thailand) Supissara Paewsampran | (Denmark) Mathias Christiansen (Denmark) Alexandra Bøje |
| 12 January | India Open (Draw): Dates: 13–18 January; Host: New Delhi, India; Venue: Indira Gandhi Arena; Level: Super 750; Prize: $950,000; Format: 32MS/32WS/32MD/32WD/32XD | Score: 19–21, 25–23, 21–18 | |
| 12 January | Swedish Open: Dates: 15–18 January; Host: Uppsala, Sweden; Venue: IFU Arena; Level: International Series; Prize: $10,000; Format: 32MS/32WS/32MD/32WD/32XD | (Japan) Minoru Koga | (Denmark) Mads Christophersen |
| 12 January | Swedish Open: Dates: 15–18 January; Host: Uppsala, Sweden; Venue: IFU Arena; Level: International Series; Prize: $10,000; Format: 32MS/32WS/32MD/32WD/32XD | Score: 21–16, 16–21, 21–18 | |
| 12 January | Swedish Open: Dates: 15–18 January; Host: Uppsala, Sweden; Venue: IFU Arena; Level: International Series; Prize: $10,000; Format: 32MS/32WS/32MD/32WD/32XD | (India) Rujula Ramu | (Chinese Taipei) Liao Yuan-chi |
| 12 January | Swedish Open: Dates: 15–18 January; Host: Uppsala, Sweden; Venue: IFU Arena; Level: International Series; Prize: $10,000; Format: 32MS/32WS/32MD/32WD/32XD | Score: 21–14, 21–14 | |
| 12 January | Swedish Open: Dates: 15–18 January; Host: Uppsala, Sweden; Venue: IFU Arena; Level: International Series; Prize: $10,000; Format: 32MS/32WS/32MD/32WD/32XD | (England) Oliver Butler (England) Samuel Jones | (Chinese Taipei) Bao Xin Da Gu La Wai (Chinese Taipei) Chou Yu-hsiang |
| 12 January | Swedish Open: Dates: 15–18 January; Host: Uppsala, Sweden; Venue: IFU Arena; Level: International Series; Prize: $10,000; Format: 32MS/32WS/32MD/32WD/32XD | Score: 16–21, 21–18, 21–18 | |
| 12 January | Swedish Open: Dates: 15–18 January; Host: Uppsala, Sweden; Venue: IFU Arena; Level: International Series; Prize: $10,000; Format: 32MS/32WS/32MD/32WD/32XD | (Denmark) Simona Pilgaard (Denmark) Signe Schulz | (United States) Audrey Chang (United States) Jasmine Yeung |
| 12 January | Swedish Open: Dates: 15–18 January; Host: Uppsala, Sweden; Venue: IFU Arena; Level: International Series; Prize: $10,000; Format: 32MS/32WS/32MD/32WD/32XD | Score: 20–22, 21–16, 21–8 | |
| 12 January | Swedish Open: Dates: 15–18 January; Host: Uppsala, Sweden; Venue: IFU Arena; Level: International Series; Prize: $10,000; Format: 32MS/32WS/32MD/32WD/32XD | (Malaysia) Loo Bing Kun (Malaysia) Noraqilah Maisarah | (Canada) Timothy Lock (Canada) Chloe Hoang |
| 12 January | Swedish Open: Dates: 15–18 January; Host: Uppsala, Sweden; Venue: IFU Arena; Level: International Series; Prize: $10,000; Format: 32MS/32WS/32MD/32WD/32XD | Score: 21–16, 21–16 | |
| 19 January | Indonesia Masters (Draw): Dates: 20–25 January; Host: Jakarta, Indonesia; Venue: Istora Gelora Bung Karno; Level: Super 500; Prize: $500,000; Format: 32MS/32WS/32MD/32WD/32XD | (Indonesia) Alwi Farhan | (Thailand) Panitchaphon Teeraratsakul |
| 19 January | Indonesia Masters (Draw): Dates: 20–25 January; Host: Jakarta, Indonesia; Venue: Istora Gelora Bung Karno; Level: Super 500; Prize: $500,000; Format: 32MS/32WS/32MD/32WD/32XD | Score: 21–5, 21–6 | |
| 19 January | Indonesia Masters (Draw): Dates: 20–25 January; Host: Jakarta, Indonesia; Venue: Istora Gelora Bung Karno; Level: Super 500; Prize: $500,000; Format: 32MS/32WS/32MD/32WD/32XD | (China) Chen Yufei | (Thailand) Pitchamon Opatniputh |
| 19 January | Indonesia Masters (Draw): Dates: 20–25 January; Host: Jakarta, Indonesia; Venue: Istora Gelora Bung Karno; Level: Super 500; Prize: $500,000; Format: 32MS/32WS/32MD/32WD/32XD | Score: 23–21, 21–13 | |
| 19 January | Indonesia Masters (Draw): Dates: 20–25 January; Host: Jakarta, Indonesia; Venue: Istora Gelora Bung Karno; Level: Super 500; Prize: $500,000; Format: 32MS/32WS/32MD/32WD/32XD | (Malaysia) Goh Sze Fei (Malaysia) Nur Izzuddin | (Indonesia) Raymond Indra (Indonesia) Nikolaus Joaquin |
| 19 January | Indonesia Masters (Draw): Dates: 20–25 January; Host: Jakarta, Indonesia; Venue: Istora Gelora Bung Karno; Level: Super 500; Prize: $500,000; Format: 32MS/32WS/32MD/32WD/32XD | Score: 21–19, 21–13 | |
| 19 January | Indonesia Masters (Draw): Dates: 20–25 January; Host: Jakarta, Indonesia; Venue: Istora Gelora Bung Karno; Level: Super 500; Prize: $500,000; Format: 32MS/32WS/32MD/32WD/32XD | (Malaysia) Pearly Tan (Malaysia) Thinaah Muralitharan | (Japan) Arisa Igarashi (Japan) Miyu Takahashi |
| 19 January | Indonesia Masters (Draw): Dates: 20–25 January; Host: Jakarta, Indonesia; Venue: Istora Gelora Bung Karno; Level: Super 500; Prize: $500,000; Format: 32MS/32WS/32MD/32WD/32XD | Score: Walkover | |
| 19 January | Indonesia Masters (Draw): Dates: 20–25 January; Host: Jakarta, Indonesia; Venue: Istora Gelora Bung Karno; Level: Super 500; Prize: $500,000; Format: 32MS/32WS/32MD/32WD/32XD | (Malaysia) Chen Tang Jie (Malaysia) Toh Ee Wei | (Denmark) Mathias Christiansen (Denmark) Alexandra Bøje |
| 19 January | Indonesia Masters (Draw): Dates: 20–25 January; Host: Jakarta, Indonesia; Venue: Istora Gelora Bung Karno; Level: Super 500; Prize: $500,000; Format: 32MS/32WS/32MD/32WD/32XD | Score: 15–21, 21–17, 21–11 | |
| 19 January | Iceland International: Dates: 22–25 January; Host: Reykjavík, Iceland; Venue: Tennis- og Badmintonfélag Reykjavíkur; Level: Future Series; Format: 32MS/32WS/32MD/32WD/32XD | (Denmark) Mikkel Langemark | (Denmark) Mathias Solgaard |
| 19 January | Iceland International: Dates: 22–25 January; Host: Reykjavík, Iceland; Venue: Tennis- og Badmintonfélag Reykjavíkur; Level: Future Series; Format: 32MS/32WS/32MD/32WD/32XD | Score: 17–21, 21–17, 21–9 | |
| 19 January | Iceland International: Dates: 22–25 January; Host: Reykjavík, Iceland; Venue: Tennis- og Badmintonfélag Reykjavíkur; Level: Future Series; Format: 32MS/32WS/32MD/32WD/32XD | (Chinese Taipei) Huang Sheng-chun | (Switzerland) Azkya Aliefa Ruhanda |
| 19 January | Iceland International: Dates: 22–25 January; Host: Reykjavík, Iceland; Venue: Tennis- og Badmintonfélag Reykjavíkur; Level: Future Series; Format: 32MS/32WS/32MD/32WD/32XD | Score: 21–13, 21–13 | |
| 19 January | Iceland International: Dates: 22–25 January; Host: Reykjavík, Iceland; Venue: Tennis- og Badmintonfélag Reykjavíkur; Level: Future Series; Format: 32MS/32WS/32MD/32WD/32XD | (France) Baptiste Labarthe (France) Quentin Ronget | (Lithuania) Danielius Beržanskis (Lithuania) Domas Paksys |
| 19 January | Iceland International: Dates: 22–25 January; Host: Reykjavík, Iceland; Venue: Tennis- og Badmintonfélag Reykjavíkur; Level: Future Series; Format: 32MS/32WS/32MD/32WD/32XD | Score: 19–21, 21–9, 21–8 | |
| 19 January | Iceland International: Dates: 22–25 January; Host: Reykjavík, Iceland; Venue: Tennis- og Badmintonfélag Reykjavíkur; Level: Future Series; Format: 32MS/32WS/32MD/32WD/32XD | (Individual Neutral Athletes) Anastasiia Boiarun (Individual Neutral Athletes) Daria Kharlampovich | (Denmark) Sarah Frederikke Vishart (Denmark) Anna Louise Winther |
| 19 January | Iceland International: Dates: 22–25 January; Host: Reykjavík, Iceland; Venue: Tennis- og Badmintonfélag Reykjavíkur; Level: Future Series; Format: 32MS/32WS/32MD/32WD/32XD | Score: 21–18, 21–9 | |
| 19 January | Iceland International: Dates: 22–25 January; Host: Reykjavík, Iceland; Venue: Tennis- og Badmintonfélag Reykjavíkur; Level: Future Series; Format: 32MS/32WS/32MD/32WD/32XD | (Switzerland) Yann Orteu (Switzerland) Caroline Racloz | (Switzerland) Nicolas Franconville (Switzerland) Julie Franconville |
| 19 January | Iceland International: Dates: 22–25 January; Host: Reykjavík, Iceland; Venue: Tennis- og Badmintonfélag Reykjavíkur; Level: Future Series; Format: 32MS/32WS/32MD/32WD/32XD | Score: 21–11, 21–14 | |
| 26 January | Thailand Masters (Draw): Dates: 27 January – 1 February; Host: Bangkok, Thailand; Venue: Nimibutr Stadium; Level: Super 300; Prize: $250,000; Format: 32MS/32WS/32MD/32WD/32XD | (Indonesia) Zaki Ubaidillah | (Thailand) Panitchaphon Teeraratsakul |
| 26 January | Thailand Masters (Draw): Dates: 27 January – 1 February; Host: Bangkok, Thailand; Venue: Nimibutr Stadium; Level: Super 300; Prize: $250,000; Format: 32MS/32WS/32MD/32WD/32XD | Score: 21–19, 20–22, 21–19 | |
| 26 January | Thailand Masters (Draw): Dates: 27 January – 1 February; Host: Bangkok, Thailand; Venue: Nimibutr Stadium; Level: Super 300; Prize: $250,000; Format: 32MS/32WS/32MD/32WD/32XD | (India) Devika Sihag | (Malaysia) Goh Jin Wei |
| 26 January | Thailand Masters (Draw): Dates: 27 January – 1 February; Host: Bangkok, Thailand; Venue: Nimibutr Stadium; Level: Super 300; Prize: $250,000; Format: 32MS/32WS/32MD/32WD/32XD | Score: 21–8, 6–3 (retired) | |
| 26 January | Thailand Masters (Draw): Dates: 27 January – 1 February; Host: Bangkok, Thailand; Venue: Nimibutr Stadium; Level: Super 300; Prize: $250,000; Format: 32MS/32WS/32MD/32WD/32XD | (Indonesia) Leo Rolly Carnando (Indonesia) Bagas Maulana | (Indonesia) Raymond Indra (Indonesia) Nikolaus Joaquin |
| 26 January | Thailand Masters (Draw): Dates: 27 January – 1 February; Host: Bangkok, Thailand; Venue: Nimibutr Stadium; Level: Super 300; Prize: $250,000; Format: 32MS/32WS/32MD/32WD/32XD | Score: 21–10, 21–17 | |
| 26 January | Thailand Masters (Draw): Dates: 27 January – 1 February; Host: Bangkok, Thailand; Venue: Nimibutr Stadium; Level: Super 300; Prize: $250,000; Format: 32MS/32WS/32MD/32WD/32XD | (Indonesia) Amallia Cahaya Pratiwi (Indonesia) Siti Fadia Silva Ramadhanti | (China) Bao Lijing (China) Li Yijing |
| 26 January | Thailand Masters (Draw): Dates: 27 January – 1 February; Host: Bangkok, Thailand; Venue: Nimibutr Stadium; Level: Super 300; Prize: $250,000; Format: 32MS/32WS/32MD/32WD/32XD | Score: 15–21, 21–15, 21–18 | |
| 26 January | Thailand Masters (Draw): Dates: 27 January – 1 February; Host: Bangkok, Thailand; Venue: Nimibutr Stadium; Level: Super 300; Prize: $250,000; Format: 32MS/32WS/32MD/32WD/32XD | (Indonesia) Adnan Maulana (Indonesia) Indah Cahya Sari Jamil | (Indonesia) Bobby Setiabudi (Indonesia) Melati Daeva Oktavianti |
| 26 January | Thailand Masters (Draw): Dates: 27 January – 1 February; Host: Bangkok, Thailand; Venue: Nimibutr Stadium; Level: Super 300; Prize: $250,000; Format: 32MS/32WS/32MD/32WD/32XD | Score: 18–21, 21–19, 21–17 | |

=== February ===
| Week commencing | Tournament | Champions | Runners-up |
|---|---|---|---|
| 2 February | Badminton Asia Team Championships (Draw): Dates: 3–8 February; Host: Qingdao, China; Venue: Conson Gymnasium; Level: Continental Team Championships; Format: 12MT/11WT | Men's team | |
| 2 February | Badminton Asia Team Championships (Draw): Dates: 3–8 February; Host: Qingdao, China; Venue: Conson Gymnasium; Level: Continental Team Championships; Format: 12MT/11WT | Japan | China |
| 2 February | Badminton Asia Team Championships (Draw): Dates: 3–8 February; Host: Qingdao, China; Venue: Conson Gymnasium; Level: Continental Team Championships; Format: 12MT/11WT | Yushi Tanaka | Hu Zhe'an |
| 2 February | Badminton Asia Team Championships (Draw): Dates: 3–8 February; Host: Qingdao, China; Venue: Conson Gymnasium; Level: Continental Team Championships; Format: 12MT/11WT | Kakeru Kumagai; Hiroki Nishi | He Jiting; Ren Xiangyu |
| 2 February | Badminton Asia Team Championships (Draw): Dates: 3–8 February; Host: Qingdao, China; Venue: Conson Gymnasium; Level: Continental Team Championships; Format: 12MT/11WT | Koki Watanabe | Zhu Xuanchen |
| 2 February | Badminton Asia Team Championships (Draw): Dates: 3–8 February; Host: Qingdao, China; Venue: Conson Gymnasium; Level: Continental Team Championships; Format: 12MT/11WT | Takumi Nomura; Yuichi Shimogami | Chen Junting; Liu Junrong |
| 2 February | Badminton Asia Team Championships (Draw): Dates: 3–8 February; Host: Qingdao, China; Venue: Conson Gymnasium; Level: Continental Team Championships; Format: 12MT/11WT | Yudai Okimoto | Dong Tianyao |
| 2 February | Badminton Asia Team Championships (Draw): Dates: 3–8 February; Host: Qingdao, China; Venue: Conson Gymnasium; Level: Continental Team Championships; Format: 12MT/11WT | Score: 3–0 | |
| 2 February | Badminton Asia Team Championships (Draw): Dates: 3–8 February; Host: Qingdao, China; Venue: Conson Gymnasium; Level: Continental Team Championships; Format: 12MT/11WT | Women's team | |
| 2 February | Badminton Asia Team Championships (Draw): Dates: 3–8 February; Host: Qingdao, China; Venue: Conson Gymnasium; Level: Continental Team Championships; Format: 12MT/11WT | South Korea | China |
| 2 February | Badminton Asia Team Championships (Draw): Dates: 3–8 February; Host: Qingdao, China; Venue: Conson Gymnasium; Level: Continental Team Championships; Format: 12MT/11WT | An Se-young | Han Qianxi |
| 2 February | Badminton Asia Team Championships (Draw): Dates: 3–8 February; Host: Qingdao, China; Venue: Conson Gymnasium; Level: Continental Team Championships; Format: 12MT/11WT | Baek Ha-na; Kim Hye-jeong | Jia Yifan; Zhang Shuxian |
| 2 February | Badminton Asia Team Championships (Draw): Dates: 3–8 February; Host: Qingdao, China; Venue: Conson Gymnasium; Level: Continental Team Championships; Format: 12MT/11WT | Kim Ga-eun | Xu Wenjing |
| 2 February | Badminton Asia Team Championships (Draw): Dates: 3–8 February; Host: Qingdao, China; Venue: Conson Gymnasium; Level: Continental Team Championships; Format: 12MT/11WT | Lee Seo-jin; Lee Yeon-woo | Chen Fanshutian; Liu Jiayue |
| 2 February | Badminton Asia Team Championships (Draw): Dates: 3–8 February; Host: Qingdao, China; Venue: Conson Gymnasium; Level: Continental Team Championships; Format: 12MT/11WT | Kim Min-ji | Yuan Anqi |
| 2 February | Badminton Asia Team Championships (Draw): Dates: 3–8 February; Host: Qingdao, China; Venue: Conson Gymnasium; Level: Continental Team Championships; Format: 12MT/11WT | Score: 3–0 | |
| 2 February | Iran Fajr International (cancelled): Dates: 3–8 February; Host: Urmia, Iran; Venue: Urmia Sports Complex; Level: International Challenge; Prize: $20,000; Format: 64MS/64WS/32MD/32WD/16XD | | |
| 2 February | Iran Fajr International (cancelled): Dates: 3–8 February; Host: Urmia, Iran; Venue: Urmia Sports Complex; Level: International Challenge; Prize: $20,000; Format: 64MS/64WS/32MD/32WD/16XD | Score: | |
| 2 February | Iran Fajr International (cancelled): Dates: 3–8 February; Host: Urmia, Iran; Venue: Urmia Sports Complex; Level: International Challenge; Prize: $20,000; Format: 64MS/64WS/32MD/32WD/16XD | Score: | |
| 2 February | Iran Fajr International (cancelled): Dates: 3–8 February; Host: Urmia, Iran; Venue: Urmia Sports Complex; Level: International Challenge; Prize: $20,000; Format: 64MS/64WS/32MD/32WD/16XD | Score: | |
| 2 February | Iran Fajr International (cancelled): Dates: 3–8 February; Host: Urmia, Iran; Venue: Urmia Sports Complex; Level: International Challenge; Prize: $20,000; Format: 64MS/64WS/32MD/32WD/16XD | Score: | |
| 2 February | Iran Fajr International (cancelled): Dates: 3–8 February; Host: Urmia, Iran; Venue: Urmia Sports Complex; Level: International Challenge; Prize: $20,000; Format: 64MS/64WS/32MD/32WD/16XD | Score: | |
| 2 February | Azerbaijan International: Dates: 3–8 February; Host: Baku, Azerbaijan; Venue: Politechnic University Sport Hall; Level: International Challenge; Prize: $20,000; Format: 32MS/32WS/32MD/32WD/32XD | (Poland) Dominik Kwinta | (Malaysia) Cheam June Wei |
| 2 February | Azerbaijan International: Dates: 3–8 February; Host: Baku, Azerbaijan; Venue: Politechnic University Sport Hall; Level: International Challenge; Prize: $20,000; Format: 32MS/32WS/32MD/32WD/32XD | Score: 21–8, 8–1 (retired) | |
| 2 February | Azerbaijan International: Dates: 3–8 February; Host: Baku, Azerbaijan; Venue: Politechnic University Sport Hall; Level: International Challenge; Prize: $20,000; Format: 32MS/32WS/32MD/32WD/32XD | (India) Devika Sihag | (India) Navya Kanderi |
| 2 February | Azerbaijan International: Dates: 3–8 February; Host: Baku, Azerbaijan; Venue: Politechnic University Sport Hall; Level: International Challenge; Prize: $20,000; Format: 32MS/32WS/32MD/32WD/32XD | Score: 21–10, 21–13 | |
| 2 February | Azerbaijan International: Dates: 3–8 February; Host: Baku, Azerbaijan; Venue: Politechnic University Sport Hall; Level: International Challenge; Prize: $20,000; Format: 32MS/32WS/32MD/32WD/32XD | (England) Alex Green (England) Zach Russ | (Scotland) Christopher Grimley (Scotland) Matthew Grimley |
| 2 February | Azerbaijan International: Dates: 3–8 February; Host: Baku, Azerbaijan; Venue: Politechnic University Sport Hall; Level: International Challenge; Prize: $20,000; Format: 32MS/32WS/32MD/32WD/32XD | Score: 21–19, 21–17 | |
| 2 February | Azerbaijan International: Dates: 3–8 February; Host: Baku, Azerbaijan; Venue: Politechnic University Sport Hall; Level: International Challenge; Prize: $20,000; Format: 32MS/32WS/32MD/32WD/32XD | (Japan) Miku Sugiyama (Japan) Natsumi Takasaki | (Individual Neutral Athletes) Anastasiia Boiarun (Individual Neutral Athletes) Daria Kharlampovich |
| 2 February | Azerbaijan International: Dates: 3–8 February; Host: Baku, Azerbaijan; Venue: Politechnic University Sport Hall; Level: International Challenge; Prize: $20,000; Format: 32MS/32WS/32MD/32WD/32XD | Score: 21–19, 21–15 | |
| 2 February | Azerbaijan International: Dates: 3–8 February; Host: Baku, Azerbaijan; Venue: Politechnic University Sport Hall; Level: International Challenge; Prize: $20,000; Format: 32MS/32WS/32MD/32WD/32XD | (India) Sathwik Reddy Kanapuram (India) Radhika Sharma | (Serbia) Mihajlo Tomić (Serbia) Anđela Vitman |
| 2 February | Azerbaijan International: Dates: 3–8 February; Host: Baku, Azerbaijan; Venue: Politechnic University Sport Hall; Level: International Challenge; Prize: $20,000; Format: 32MS/32WS/32MD/32WD/32XD | Score: 24–22, 10–21, 24–22 | |
| 2 February | Oceania Championships (Draw): Dates: 8–12 February; Host: Auckland, New Zealand; Venue: Badminton North Harbour Centre; Level: Continental Individual Championships; Format: 128MS/64WS/64MD/64WD/128XD | (Australia) Shrey Dhand | (New Zealand) Edward Lau |
| 2 February | Oceania Championships (Draw): Dates: 8–12 February; Host: Auckland, New Zealand; Venue: Badminton North Harbour Centre; Level: Continental Individual Championships; Format: 128MS/64WS/64MD/64WD/128XD | Score: 20–22, 21–17, 21–13 | |
| 2 February | Oceania Championships (Draw): Dates: 8–12 February; Host: Auckland, New Zealand; Venue: Badminton North Harbour Centre; Level: Continental Individual Championships; Format: 128MS/64WS/64MD/64WD/128XD | (New Zealand) Shaunna Li | (Australia) Tiffany Ho |
| 2 February | Oceania Championships (Draw): Dates: 8–12 February; Host: Auckland, New Zealand; Venue: Badminton North Harbour Centre; Level: Continental Individual Championships; Format: 128MS/64WS/64MD/64WD/128XD | Score: 21–14, 21–14 | |
| 2 February | Oceania Championships (Draw): Dates: 8–12 February; Host: Auckland, New Zealand; Venue: Badminton North Harbour Centre; Level: Continental Individual Championships; Format: 128MS/64WS/64MD/64WD/128XD | (Australia) Rizky Hidayat (Australia) Jack Yu | (New Zealand) Chris Benzie (New Zealand) Dylan Soedjasa |
| 2 February | Oceania Championships (Draw): Dates: 8–12 February; Host: Auckland, New Zealand; Venue: Badminton North Harbour Centre; Level: Continental Individual Championships; Format: 128MS/64WS/64MD/64WD/128XD | Score: 21–17, 21–9 | |
| 2 February | Oceania Championships (Draw): Dates: 8–12 February; Host: Auckland, New Zealand; Venue: Badminton North Harbour Centre; Level: Continental Individual Championships; Format: 128MS/64WS/64MD/64WD/128XD | (Australia) Gronya Somerville (Australia) Angela Yu | (New Zealand) Berry Ng (New Zealand) Amanda Ting |
| 2 February | Oceania Championships (Draw): Dates: 8–12 February; Host: Auckland, New Zealand; Venue: Badminton North Harbour Centre; Level: Continental Individual Championships; Format: 128MS/64WS/64MD/64WD/128XD | Score: 21–9, 21–9 | |
| 2 February | Oceania Championships (Draw): Dates: 8–12 February; Host: Auckland, New Zealand; Venue: Badminton North Harbour Centre; Level: Continental Individual Championships; Format: 128MS/64WS/64MD/64WD/128XD | (Australia) Andika Ramadiansyah (Australia) Angela Yu | (New Zealand) Ricky Cheng (New Zealand) Natalie Ting |
| 2 February | Oceania Championships (Draw): Dates: 8–12 February; Host: Auckland, New Zealand; Venue: Badminton North Harbour Centre; Level: Continental Individual Championships; Format: 128MS/64WS/64MD/64WD/128XD | Score: 21–13, 21–16 | |
| 9 February | All Africa Men's and Women's Team Badminton Championships (Draw): Dates: 9–12 February; Host: Gaborone, Botswana; Venue: Royal Aria; Level: Continental Team Championships; Format: 13MT/10WT | Men's team | |
| 9 February | All Africa Men's and Women's Team Badminton Championships (Draw): Dates: 9–12 February; Host: Gaborone, Botswana; Venue: Royal Aria; Level: Continental Team Championships; Format: 13MT/10WT | Algeria | Mauritius |
| 9 February | All Africa Men's and Women's Team Badminton Championships (Draw): Dates: 9–12 February; Host: Gaborone, Botswana; Venue: Royal Aria; Level: Continental Team Championships; Format: 13MT/10WT | Adel Hamek | Lucas Douce |
| 9 February | All Africa Men's and Women's Team Badminton Championships (Draw): Dates: 9–12 February; Host: Gaborone, Botswana; Venue: Royal Aria; Level: Continental Team Championships; Format: 13MT/10WT | Mohamed Abderrahime Belarbi | Julien Paul |
| 9 February | All Africa Men's and Women's Team Badminton Championships (Draw): Dates: 9–12 February; Host: Gaborone, Botswana; Venue: Royal Aria; Level: Continental Team Championships; Format: 13MT/10WT | Koceila Mammeri | Khemtish Rai Nundah |
| 9 February | All Africa Men's and Women's Team Badminton Championships (Draw): Dates: 9–12 February; Host: Gaborone, Botswana; Venue: Royal Aria; Level: Continental Team Championships; Format: 13MT/10WT | Mohamed Abderrahime Belarbi; Youcef Sabri Medel | Lucas Douce; Julien Paul |
| 9 February | All Africa Men's and Women's Team Badminton Championships (Draw): Dates: 9–12 February; Host: Gaborone, Botswana; Venue: Royal Aria; Level: Continental Team Championships; Format: 13MT/10WT | Adel Hamek; Koceila Mammeri | Jean Bernard Bongout; Khemtish Rai Nundah |
| 9 February | All Africa Men's and Women's Team Badminton Championships (Draw): Dates: 9–12 February; Host: Gaborone, Botswana; Venue: Royal Aria; Level: Continental Team Championships; Format: 13MT/10WT | Score: 3–2 | |
| 9 February | All Africa Men's and Women's Team Badminton Championships (Draw): Dates: 9–12 February; Host: Gaborone, Botswana; Venue: Royal Aria; Level: Continental Team Championships; Format: 13MT/10WT | Women's team | |
| 9 February | All Africa Men's and Women's Team Badminton Championships (Draw): Dates: 9–12 February; Host: Gaborone, Botswana; Venue: Royal Aria; Level: Continental Team Championships; Format: 13MT/10WT | South Africa | Egypt |
| 9 February | All Africa Men's and Women's Team Badminton Championships (Draw): Dates: 9–12 February; Host: Gaborone, Botswana; Venue: Royal Aria; Level: Continental Team Championships; Format: 13MT/10WT | Johanita Scholtz | Nour Ahmed Youssri |
| 9 February | All Africa Men's and Women's Team Badminton Championships (Draw): Dates: 9–12 February; Host: Gaborone, Botswana; Venue: Royal Aria; Level: Continental Team Championships; Format: 13MT/10WT | Elme de Villiers | Doha Hany |
| 9 February | All Africa Men's and Women's Team Badminton Championships (Draw): Dates: 9–12 February; Host: Gaborone, Botswana; Venue: Royal Aria; Level: Continental Team Championships; Format: 13MT/10WT | Amy Ackerman | Fatema Rabie |
| 9 February | All Africa Men's and Women's Team Badminton Championships (Draw): Dates: 9–12 February; Host: Gaborone, Botswana; Venue: Royal Aria; Level: Continental Team Championships; Format: 13MT/10WT | Amy Ackerman; Johanita Scholtz | Nour Ahmed Youssri; Doha Hany |
| 9 February | All Africa Men's and Women's Team Badminton Championships (Draw): Dates: 9–12 February; Host: Gaborone, Botswana; Venue: Royal Aria; Level: Continental Team Championships; Format: 13MT/10WT | Elme de Villiers; Anri Schoonees | Ganna Elwazery; Hana Tarek Zaher |
| 9 February | All Africa Men's and Women's Team Badminton Championships (Draw): Dates: 9–12 February; Host: Gaborone, Botswana; Venue: Royal Aria; Level: Continental Team Championships; Format: 13MT/10WT | Score: 3–1 | |
| 9 February | European Men's and Women's Team Championships (Draw): Dates: 11–15 February; Host: Başakşehir, Turkey; Venue: Başakşehir Sports Complex; Level: Continental Team Championships; Format: 8MT/8WT | Men's team | |
| 9 February | European Men's and Women's Team Championships (Draw): Dates: 11–15 February; Host: Başakşehir, Turkey; Venue: Başakşehir Sports Complex; Level: Continental Team Championships; Format: 8MT/8WT | France | Denmark |
| 9 February | European Men's and Women's Team Championships (Draw): Dates: 11–15 February; Host: Başakşehir, Turkey; Venue: Başakşehir Sports Complex; Level: Continental Team Championships; Format: 8MT/8WT | Christo Popov | Anders Antonsen |
| 9 February | European Men's and Women's Team Championships (Draw): Dates: 11–15 February; Host: Başakşehir, Turkey; Venue: Başakşehir Sports Complex; Level: Continental Team Championships; Format: 8MT/8WT | Alex Lanier | Rasmus Gemke |
| 9 February | European Men's and Women's Team Championships (Draw): Dates: 11–15 February; Host: Başakşehir, Turkey; Venue: Başakşehir Sports Complex; Level: Continental Team Championships; Format: 8MT/8WT | Toma Junior Popov | Ditlev Jæger Holm |
| 9 February | European Men's and Women's Team Championships (Draw): Dates: 11–15 February; Host: Başakşehir, Turkey; Venue: Başakşehir Sports Complex; Level: Continental Team Championships; Format: 8MT/8WT | Éloi Adam; Léo Rossi | Kim Astrup; Anders Skaarup Rasmussen |
| 9 February | European Men's and Women's Team Championships (Draw): Dates: 11–15 February; Host: Başakşehir, Turkey; Venue: Başakşehir Sports Complex; Level: Continental Team Championships; Format: 8MT/8WT | Thom Gicquel; Toma Junior Popov | Daniel Lundgaard; Mads Vestergaard |
| 9 February | European Men's and Women's Team Championships (Draw): Dates: 11–15 February; Host: Başakşehir, Turkey; Venue: Başakşehir Sports Complex; Level: Continental Team Championships; Format: 8MT/8WT | Score: 3–2 | |
| 9 February | European Men's and Women's Team Championships (Draw): Dates: 11–15 February; Host: Başakşehir, Turkey; Venue: Başakşehir Sports Complex; Level: Continental Team Championships; Format: 8MT/8WT | Women's team | |
| 9 February | European Men's and Women's Team Championships (Draw): Dates: 11–15 February; Host: Başakşehir, Turkey; Venue: Başakşehir Sports Complex; Level: Continental Team Championships; Format: 8MT/8WT | Bulgaria | Denmark |
| 9 February | European Men's and Women's Team Championships (Draw): Dates: 11–15 February; Host: Başakşehir, Turkey; Venue: Başakşehir Sports Complex; Level: Continental Team Championships; Format: 8MT/8WT | Kaloyana Nalbantova | Line Kjærsfeldt |
| 9 February | European Men's and Women's Team Championships (Draw): Dates: 11–15 February; Host: Başakşehir, Turkey; Venue: Başakşehir Sports Complex; Level: Continental Team Championships; Format: 8MT/8WT | Stefani Stoeva | Mia Blichfeldt |
| 9 February | European Men's and Women's Team Championships (Draw): Dates: 11–15 February; Host: Başakşehir, Turkey; Venue: Başakşehir Sports Complex; Level: Continental Team Championships; Format: 8MT/8WT | Gergana Pavlova | Line Christophersen |
| 9 February | European Men's and Women's Team Championships (Draw): Dates: 11–15 February; Host: Başakşehir, Turkey; Venue: Başakşehir Sports Complex; Level: Continental Team Championships; Format: 8MT/8WT | Gabriela Stoeva; Stefani Stoeva | Amalie Cecilie Kudsk; Amalie Schulz |
| 9 February | European Men's and Women's Team Championships (Draw): Dates: 11–15 February; Host: Başakşehir, Turkey; Venue: Başakşehir Sports Complex; Level: Continental Team Championships; Format: 8MT/8WT | Mariya Mitsova; Kaloyana Nalbantova | Line Christophersen; Amalie Magelund |
| 9 February | European Men's and Women's Team Championships (Draw): Dates: 11–15 February; Host: Başakşehir, Turkey; Venue: Başakşehir Sports Complex; Level: Continental Team Championships; Format: 8MT/8WT | Score: 3–1 | |
| 9 February | Pan American Male & Female Cup (Draw): Dates: 12–15 February; Host: Guatemala City, Guatemala; Venue: Gimnasio Teodoro Palacios Flores; Level: Continental Team Championships; Format: 10MT/9WT | Men's team | |
| 9 February | Pan American Male & Female Cup (Draw): Dates: 12–15 February; Host: Guatemala City, Guatemala; Venue: Gimnasio Teodoro Palacios Flores; Level: Continental Team Championships; Format: 10MT/9WT | Canada | United States |
| 9 February | Pan American Male & Female Cup (Draw): Dates: 12–15 February; Host: Guatemala City, Guatemala; Venue: Gimnasio Teodoro Palacios Flores; Level: Continental Team Championships; Format: 10MT/9WT | Victor Lai | Mark Shelley Alcala |
| 9 February | Pan American Male & Female Cup (Draw): Dates: 12–15 February; Host: Guatemala City, Guatemala; Venue: Gimnasio Teodoro Palacios Flores; Level: Continental Team Championships; Format: 10MT/9WT | Jonathan Lai; Ty Alexander Lindeman | Chen Zhi-yi; Presley Smith |
| 9 February | Pan American Male & Female Cup (Draw): Dates: 12–15 February; Host: Guatemala City, Guatemala; Venue: Gimnasio Teodoro Palacios Flores; Level: Continental Team Championships; Format: 10MT/9WT | Brian Yang | Garret Tan |
| 9 February | Pan American Male & Female Cup (Draw): Dates: 12–15 February; Host: Guatemala City, Guatemala; Venue: Gimnasio Teodoro Palacios Flores; Level: Continental Team Championships; Format: 10MT/9WT | Kevin Lee; Nyl Yakura | Arden Lee; Joshua Yang |
| 9 February | Pan American Male & Female Cup (Draw): Dates: 12–15 February; Host: Guatemala City, Guatemala; Venue: Gimnasio Teodoro Palacios Flores; Level: Continental Team Championships; Format: 10MT/9WT | Joshua Nguyen | Adrian Mar |
| 9 February | Pan American Male & Female Cup (Draw): Dates: 12–15 February; Host: Guatemala City, Guatemala; Venue: Gimnasio Teodoro Palacios Flores; Level: Continental Team Championships; Format: 10MT/9WT | Score: 3–1 | |
| 9 February | Pan American Male & Female Cup (Draw): Dates: 12–15 February; Host: Guatemala City, Guatemala; Venue: Gimnasio Teodoro Palacios Flores; Level: Continental Team Championships; Format: 10MT/9WT | Women's team | |
| 9 February | Pan American Male & Female Cup (Draw): Dates: 12–15 February; Host: Guatemala City, Guatemala; Venue: Gimnasio Teodoro Palacios Flores; Level: Continental Team Championships; Format: 10MT/9WT | Canada | United States |
| 9 February | Pan American Male & Female Cup (Draw): Dates: 12–15 February; Host: Guatemala City, Guatemala; Venue: Gimnasio Teodoro Palacios Flores; Level: Continental Team Championships; Format: 10MT/9WT | Michelle Li | Beiwen Zhang |
| 9 February | Pan American Male & Female Cup (Draw): Dates: 12–15 February; Host: Guatemala City, Guatemala; Venue: Gimnasio Teodoro Palacios Flores; Level: Continental Team Championships; Format: 10MT/9WT | Crystal Lai; Eliana Zhang | Lauren Lam; Allison Lee |
| 9 February | Pan American Male & Female Cup (Draw): Dates: 12–15 February; Host: Guatemala City, Guatemala; Venue: Gimnasio Teodoro Palacios Flores; Level: Continental Team Championships; Format: 10MT/9WT | Wen Yu Zhang | Ella Lin |
| 9 February | Pan American Male & Female Cup (Draw): Dates: 12–15 February; Host: Guatemala City, Guatemala; Venue: Gimnasio Teodoro Palacios Flores; Level: Continental Team Championships; Format: 10MT/9WT | Jackie Dent; Josephine Wu | Francesca Corbett; Jennie Gai |
| 9 February | Pan American Male & Female Cup (Draw): Dates: 12–15 February; Host: Guatemala City, Guatemala; Venue: Gimnasio Teodoro Palacios Flores; Level: Continental Team Championships; Format: 10MT/9WT | Rachel Chan | Audrey Chang |
| 9 February | Pan American Male & Female Cup (Draw): Dates: 12–15 February; Host: Guatemala City, Guatemala; Venue: Gimnasio Teodoro Palacios Flores; Level: Continental Team Championships; Format: 10MT/9WT | Score: 3–2 | |
| 9 February | Oceania Men's and Women's Team Badminton Championships (Draw): Dates: 13–15 February; Host: Auckland, New Zealand; Venue: Badminton North Harbour Centre; Level: Continental Team Championships; Format: 6MT/6WT | Men's team | |
| 9 February | Oceania Men's and Women's Team Badminton Championships (Draw): Dates: 13–15 February; Host: Auckland, New Zealand; Venue: Badminton North Harbour Centre; Level: Continental Team Championships; Format: 6MT/6WT | Australia | New Zealand |
| 9 February | Oceania Men's and Women's Team Badminton Championships (Draw): Dates: 13–15 February; Host: Auckland, New Zealand; Venue: Badminton North Harbour Centre; Level: Continental Team Championships; Format: 6MT/6WT | Shrey Dhand; Rizky Hidayat; Andika Ramadiansyah; Ephraim Stephen Sam; Jack Yu; Frederick Zhao | Chris Benzie; Ricky Cheng; Jonathan Curtin; Raphael Chris Deloy; Adam Jeffrey; Edward Lau; Daniel McMillan; Dylan Soedjasa; Vincent Tao |
| 9 February | Oceania Men's and Women's Team Badminton Championships (Draw): Dates: 13–15 February; Host: Auckland, New Zealand; Venue: Badminton North Harbour Centre; Level: Continental Team Championships; Format: 6MT/6WT | Score: Round robin | |
| 9 February | Oceania Men's and Women's Team Badminton Championships (Draw): Dates: 13–15 February; Host: Auckland, New Zealand; Venue: Badminton North Harbour Centre; Level: Continental Team Championships; Format: 6MT/6WT | Women's team | |
| 9 February | Oceania Men's and Women's Team Badminton Championships (Draw): Dates: 13–15 February; Host: Auckland, New Zealand; Venue: Badminton North Harbour Centre; Level: Continental Team Championships; Format: 6MT/6WT | Australia | New Zealand |
| 9 February | Oceania Men's and Women's Team Badminton Championships (Draw): Dates: 13–15 February; Host: Auckland, New Zealand; Venue: Badminton North Harbour Centre; Level: Continental Team Championships; Format: 6MT/6WT | Jesslyn Carrisia; Tiffany Ho; Faye Huo; Gronya Somerville; Victoria Tjonadi; Angela Yu | Shaunna Li; Laura Lin; Yanxi Liu; Natalie Ting; Justine Villegas; Amy Wang; Josephine Zhao; Camellia Zhou; Jenny Zhu |
| 9 February | Oceania Men's and Women's Team Badminton Championships (Draw): Dates: 13–15 February; Host: Auckland, New Zealand; Venue: Badminton North Harbour Centre; Level: Continental Team Championships; Format: 6MT/6WT | Score: Round robin | |
| 9 February | All African Championships (Draw): Dates: 13–15 February; Host: Gaborone, Botswana; Venue: Royal Aria; Level: Continental Individual Championships; Format: 128MS/64WS/64MD/32WD/64XD | (Egypt) Adham Hatem Elgamal | (Mauritius) Jean Bernard Bongout |
| 9 February | All African Championships (Draw): Dates: 13–15 February; Host: Gaborone, Botswana; Venue: Royal Aria; Level: Continental Individual Championships; Format: 128MS/64WS/64MD/32WD/64XD | Score: 2–1 (retired) | |
| 9 February | All African Championships (Draw): Dates: 13–15 February; Host: Gaborone, Botswana; Venue: Royal Aria; Level: Continental Individual Championships; Format: 128MS/64WS/64MD/32WD/64XD | (Uganda) Fadilah Mohamed Rafi | (South Africa) Johanita Scholtz |
| 9 February | All African Championships (Draw): Dates: 13–15 February; Host: Gaborone, Botswana; Venue: Royal Aria; Level: Continental Individual Championships; Format: 128MS/64WS/64MD/32WD/64XD | Score: 21–17, 16–21, 21–19 | |
| 9 February | All African Championships (Draw): Dates: 13–15 February; Host: Gaborone, Botswana; Venue: Royal Aria; Level: Continental Individual Championships; Format: 128MS/64WS/64MD/32WD/64XD | (Algeria) Koceila Mammeri (Algeria) Youcef Sabri Medel | (Zambia) Chongo Mulenga (Zambia) Kalombo Mulenga |
| 9 February | All African Championships (Draw): Dates: 13–15 February; Host: Gaborone, Botswana; Venue: Royal Aria; Level: Continental Individual Championships; Format: 128MS/64WS/64MD/32WD/64XD | Score: 21–16, 21–19 | |
| 9 February | All African Championships (Draw): Dates: 13–15 February; Host: Gaborone, Botswana; Venue: Royal Aria; Level: Continental Individual Championships; Format: 128MS/64WS/64MD/32WD/64XD | (South Africa) Amy Ackerman (South Africa) Johanita Scholtz | (Egypt) Nour Ahmed Youssri (Egypt) Doha Hany |
| 9 February | All African Championships (Draw): Dates: 13–15 February; Host: Gaborone, Botswana; Venue: Royal Aria; Level: Continental Individual Championships; Format: 128MS/64WS/64MD/32WD/64XD | Score: 21–18, 21–17 | |
| 9 February | All African Championships (Draw): Dates: 13–15 February; Host: Gaborone, Botswana; Venue: Royal Aria; Level: Continental Individual Championships; Format: 128MS/64WS/64MD/32WD/64XD | (Algeria) Koceila Mammeri (Algeria) Tanina Mammeri | (South Africa) Caden Kakora (South Africa) Amy Ackerman |
| 9 February | All African Championships (Draw): Dates: 13–15 February; Host: Gaborone, Botswana; Venue: Royal Aria; Level: Continental Individual Championships; Format: 128MS/64WS/64MD/32WD/64XD | Score: 21–12, 21–9 | |
| 16 February | Uganda International: Dates: 18–22 February; Host: Kampala, Uganda; Venue: Lugogo Stadium; Level: International Challenge; Prize: $20,000; Format: 32MS/32WS/32MD/32WD/32XD | (Australia) Karono | (Israel) Misha Zilberman |
| 16 February | Uganda International: Dates: 18–22 February; Host: Kampala, Uganda; Venue: Lugogo Stadium; Level: International Challenge; Prize: $20,000; Format: 32MS/32WS/32MD/32WD/32XD | Score: 21–14, 24–22 | |
| 16 February | Uganda International: Dates: 18–22 February; Host: Kampala, Uganda; Venue: Lugogo Stadium; Level: International Challenge; Prize: $20,000; Format: 32MS/32WS/32MD/32WD/32XD | (India) Anupama Upadhyaya | (India) Mansi Singh |
| 16 February | Uganda International: Dates: 18–22 February; Host: Kampala, Uganda; Venue: Lugogo Stadium; Level: International Challenge; Prize: $20,000; Format: 32MS/32WS/32MD/32WD/32XD | Score: 21–17, 21–10 | |
| 16 February | Uganda International: Dates: 18–22 February; Host: Kampala, Uganda; Venue: Lugogo Stadium; Level: International Challenge; Prize: $20,000; Format: 32MS/32WS/32MD/32WD/32XD | (India) Bhargav Arigela (India) Viswatej Gobburu | (India) Pruthvi Roy (India) Sai Pratheek K. |
| 16 February | Uganda International: Dates: 18–22 February; Host: Kampala, Uganda; Venue: Lugogo Stadium; Level: International Challenge; Prize: $20,000; Format: 32MS/32WS/32MD/32WD/32XD | Score: 11–21, 21–18, 21–19 | |
| 16 February | Uganda International: Dates: 18–22 February; Host: Kampala, Uganda; Venue: Lugogo Stadium; Level: International Challenge; Prize: $20,000; Format: 32MS/32WS/32MD/32WD/32XD | (United States) Lauren Lam (United States) Allison Lee | (India) Kavipriya Selvam (India) Simran Singhi |
| 16 February | Uganda International: Dates: 18–22 February; Host: Kampala, Uganda; Venue: Lugogo Stadium; Level: International Challenge; Prize: $20,000; Format: 32MS/32WS/32MD/32WD/32XD | Score: 21–12, 21–14 | |
| 16 February | Uganda International: Dates: 18–22 February; Host: Kampala, Uganda; Venue: Lugogo Stadium; Level: International Challenge; Prize: $20,000; Format: 32MS/32WS/32MD/32WD/32XD | (India) Ishaan Bhatnagar (India) Shruti Mishra | (India) Nithin H.V. (India) Srinidhi Narayanan |
| 16 February | Uganda International: Dates: 18–22 February; Host: Kampala, Uganda; Venue: Lugogo Stadium; Level: International Challenge; Prize: $20,000; Format: 32MS/32WS/32MD/32WD/32XD | Score: 13–21, 21–19, 1–0 (retired) | |
| 23 February | German Open (Draw): Dates: 24 February – 1 March; Host: Mülheim, Germany; Venue: Westenergie Sporthalle; Level: Super 300; Prize: $250,000; Format: 32MS/32WS/32MD/32WD/32XD | (France) Christo Popov | (France) Toma Junior Popov |
| 23 February | German Open (Draw): Dates: 24 February – 1 March; Host: Mülheim, Germany; Venue: Westenergie Sporthalle; Level: Super 300; Prize: $250,000; Format: 32MS/32WS/32MD/32WD/32XD | Score: 21–16, 21–15 | |
| 23 February | German Open (Draw): Dates: 24 February – 1 March; Host: Mülheim, Germany; Venue: Westenergie Sporthalle; Level: Super 300; Prize: $250,000; Format: 32MS/32WS/32MD/32WD/32XD | (China) Han Qianxi | (China) Wang Zhiyi |
| 23 February | German Open (Draw): Dates: 24 February – 1 March; Host: Mülheim, Germany; Venue: Westenergie Sporthalle; Level: Super 300; Prize: $250,000; Format: 32MS/32WS/32MD/32WD/32XD | Score: 21–19, 22–20 | |
| 23 February | German Open (Draw): Dates: 24 February – 1 March; Host: Mülheim, Germany; Venue: Westenergie Sporthalle; Level: Super 300; Prize: $250,000; Format: 32MS/32WS/32MD/32WD/32XD | (China) Chen Boyang (China) Liu Yi | (France) Julien Maio (France) William Villeger |
| 23 February | German Open (Draw): Dates: 24 February – 1 March; Host: Mülheim, Germany; Venue: Westenergie Sporthalle; Level: Super 300; Prize: $250,000; Format: 32MS/32WS/32MD/32WD/32XD | Score: 17–21, 21–15, 21–12 | |
| 23 February | German Open (Draw): Dates: 24 February – 1 March; Host: Mülheim, Germany; Venue: Westenergie Sporthalle; Level: Super 300; Prize: $250,000; Format: 32MS/32WS/32MD/32WD/32XD | (China) Bao Lijing (China) Luo Xumin | (China) Li Yijing (China) Wang Yiduo |
| 23 February | German Open (Draw): Dates: 24 February – 1 March; Host: Mülheim, Germany; Venue: Westenergie Sporthalle; Level: Super 300; Prize: $250,000; Format: 32MS/32WS/32MD/32WD/32XD | Score: 21–16, 21–16 | |
| 23 February | German Open (Draw): Dates: 24 February – 1 March; Host: Mülheim, Germany; Venue: Westenergie Sporthalle; Level: Super 300; Prize: $250,000; Format: 32MS/32WS/32MD/32WD/32XD | (China) Cheng Xing (China) Zhang Chi | (Denmark) Mads Vestergaard (Denmark) Christine Busch |
| 23 February | German Open (Draw): Dates: 24 February – 1 March; Host: Mülheim, Germany; Venue: Westenergie Sporthalle; Level: Super 300; Prize: $250,000; Format: 32MS/32WS/32MD/32WD/32XD | Score: 21–12, 21–17 | |
| 23 February | Singapore International I: Dates: 24 February – 1 March; Host: Singapore, Singapore; Venue: Singapore Badminton Hall East Coast @ EXPO; Level: International Challenge; Prize: $30,000; Format: 64MS/32WS/32MD/32WD/32XD | (Chinese Taipei) Wu Zhe-ying | (Indonesia) Bismo Raya Oktora |
| 23 February | Singapore International I: Dates: 24 February – 1 March; Host: Singapore, Singapore; Venue: Singapore Badminton Hall East Coast @ EXPO; Level: International Challenge; Prize: $30,000; Format: 64MS/32WS/32MD/32WD/32XD | Score: 5–21, 21–19, 21–16 | |
| 23 February | Singapore International I: Dates: 24 February – 1 March; Host: Singapore, Singapore; Venue: Singapore Badminton Hall East Coast @ EXPO; Level: International Challenge; Prize: $30,000; Format: 64MS/32WS/32MD/32WD/32XD | (Malaysia) Goh Jin Wei | (Indonesia) Komang Ayu Cahya Dewi |
| 23 February | Singapore International I: Dates: 24 February – 1 March; Host: Singapore, Singapore; Venue: Singapore Badminton Hall East Coast @ EXPO; Level: International Challenge; Prize: $30,000; Format: 64MS/32WS/32MD/32WD/32XD | Score: 21–11, 21–11 | |
| 23 February | Singapore International I: Dates: 24 February – 1 March; Host: Singapore, Singapore; Venue: Singapore Badminton Hall East Coast @ EXPO; Level: International Challenge; Prize: $30,000; Format: 64MS/32WS/32MD/32WD/32XD | (Indonesia) Taufik Aderya (Indonesia) Daniel Edgar Marvino | (Indonesia) Yeremia Rambitan (Indonesia) Patra Harapan Rindorindo |
| 23 February | Singapore International I: Dates: 24 February – 1 March; Host: Singapore, Singapore; Venue: Singapore Badminton Hall East Coast @ EXPO; Level: International Challenge; Prize: $30,000; Format: 64MS/32WS/32MD/32WD/32XD | Score: 21–19, 24–22 | |
| 23 February | Singapore International I: Dates: 24 February – 1 March; Host: Singapore, Singapore; Venue: Singapore Badminton Hall East Coast @ EXPO; Level: International Challenge; Prize: $30,000; Format: 64MS/32WS/32MD/32WD/32XD | (South Korea) Jung Kyung-eun (South Korea) Kim So-yeong | (South Korea) Kim Yu-jung (South Korea) Lee Yu-lim |
| 23 February | Singapore International I: Dates: 24 February – 1 March; Host: Singapore, Singapore; Venue: Singapore Badminton Hall East Coast @ EXPO; Level: International Challenge; Prize: $30,000; Format: 64MS/32WS/32MD/32WD/32XD | Score: 24–22, 21–14 | |
| 23 February | Singapore International I: Dates: 24 February – 1 March; Host: Singapore, Singapore; Venue: Singapore Badminton Hall East Coast @ EXPO; Level: International Challenge; Prize: $30,000; Format: 64MS/32WS/32MD/32WD/32XD | (Japan) Yuta Watanabe (Japan) Maya Taguchi | (Hong Kong) Chan Yin Chak (Hong Kong) Ng Tsz Yau |
| 23 February | Singapore International I: Dates: 24 February – 1 March; Host: Singapore, Singapore; Venue: Singapore Badminton Hall East Coast @ EXPO; Level: International Challenge; Prize: $30,000; Format: 64MS/32WS/32MD/32WD/32XD | Score: 21–15, 21–13 | |

=== March ===
| Week commencing | Tournament | Champions | Runners-up |
|---|---|---|---|
| 2 March | All England Open (Draw): Dates: 3–8 March; Host: Birmingham, England; Venue: Arena Birmingham; Level: Super 1000; Prize: $1,450,000; Format: 32MS/32WS/32MD/32WD/32XD | (Chinese Taipei) Lin Chun-yi | (India) Lakshya Sen |
| 2 March | All England Open (Draw): Dates: 3–8 March; Host: Birmingham, England; Venue: Arena Birmingham; Level: Super 1000; Prize: $1,450,000; Format: 32MS/32WS/32MD/32WD/32XD | Score: 21–15, 22–20 | |
| 2 March | All England Open (Draw): Dates: 3–8 March; Host: Birmingham, England; Venue: Arena Birmingham; Level: Super 1000; Prize: $1,450,000; Format: 32MS/32WS/32MD/32WD/32XD | (China) Wang Zhiyi | (South Korea) An Se-young |
| 2 March | All England Open (Draw): Dates: 3–8 March; Host: Birmingham, England; Venue: Arena Birmingham; Level: Super 1000; Prize: $1,450,000; Format: 32MS/32WS/32MD/32WD/32XD | Score: 21–15, 21–19 | |
| 2 March | All England Open (Draw): Dates: 3–8 March; Host: Birmingham, England; Venue: Arena Birmingham; Level: Super 1000; Prize: $1,450,000; Format: 32MS/32WS/32MD/32WD/32XD | (South Korea) Kim Won-ho (South Korea) Seo Seung-jae | (Malaysia) Aaron Chia (Malaysia) Soh Wooi Yik |
| 2 March | All England Open (Draw): Dates: 3–8 March; Host: Birmingham, England; Venue: Arena Birmingham; Level: Super 1000; Prize: $1,450,000; Format: 32MS/32WS/32MD/32WD/32XD | Score: 18–21, 21–12, 21–19 | |
| 2 March | All England Open (Draw): Dates: 3–8 March; Host: Birmingham, England; Venue: Arena Birmingham; Level: Super 1000; Prize: $1,450,000; Format: 32MS/32WS/32MD/32WD/32XD | (China) Liu Shengshu (China) Tan Ning | (South Korea) Baek Ha-na (South Korea) Lee So-hee |
| 2 March | All England Open (Draw): Dates: 3–8 March; Host: Birmingham, England; Venue: Arena Birmingham; Level: Super 1000; Prize: $1,450,000; Format: 32MS/32WS/32MD/32WD/32XD | Score: 21–18, 21–12 | |
| 2 March | All England Open (Draw): Dates: 3–8 March; Host: Birmingham, England; Venue: Arena Birmingham; Level: Super 1000; Prize: $1,450,000; Format: 32MS/32WS/32MD/32WD/32XD | (Chinese Taipei) Ye Hong-wei (Chinese Taipei) Nicole Gonzales Chan | (France) Thom Gicquel (France) Delphine Delrue |
| 2 March | All England Open (Draw): Dates: 3–8 March; Host: Birmingham, England; Venue: Arena Birmingham; Level: Super 1000; Prize: $1,450,000; Format: 32MS/32WS/32MD/32WD/32XD | Score: 21–19, 21–18 | |
| 2 March | Singapore International: Dates: 3–8 March; Host: Singapore, Singapore; Venue: Singapore Badminton Hall East Coast @ EXPO; Level: International Series; Prize: $15,000; Format: 64MS/32WS/32MD/32WD/32XD | (Thailand) Wongsup Wongsup-in | (Chinese Taipei) Wu Zhe-ying |
| 2 March | Singapore International: Dates: 3–8 March; Host: Singapore, Singapore; Venue: Singapore Badminton Hall East Coast @ EXPO; Level: International Series; Prize: $15,000; Format: 64MS/32WS/32MD/32WD/32XD | Score: 22–20, 19–21, 21–12 | |
| 2 March | Singapore International: Dates: 3–8 March; Host: Singapore, Singapore; Venue: Singapore Badminton Hall East Coast @ EXPO; Level: International Series; Prize: $15,000; Format: 64MS/32WS/32MD/32WD/32XD | (Thailand) Yataweemin Ketklieng | (Chinese Taipei) Liao Jui-chi |
| 2 March | Singapore International: Dates: 3–8 March; Host: Singapore, Singapore; Venue: Singapore Badminton Hall East Coast @ EXPO; Level: International Series; Prize: $15,000; Format: 64MS/32WS/32MD/32WD/32XD | Score: 21–15, 21–9 | |
| 2 March | Singapore International: Dates: 3–8 March; Host: Singapore, Singapore; Venue: Singapore Badminton Hall East Coast @ EXPO; Level: International Series; Prize: $15,000; Format: 64MS/32WS/32MD/32WD/32XD | (Indonesia) Erwin Rendana Purnomo (Indonesia) Ade Yusuf Santoso | (Indonesia) Sansan Herdiansyah (Indonesia) Adriel Ferdinand Leonardo |
| 2 March | Singapore International: Dates: 3–8 March; Host: Singapore, Singapore; Venue: Singapore Badminton Hall East Coast @ EXPO; Level: International Series; Prize: $15,000; Format: 64MS/32WS/32MD/32WD/32XD | Score: 17–21, 21–11, 21–17 | |
| 2 March | Singapore International: Dates: 3–8 March; Host: Singapore, Singapore; Venue: Singapore Badminton Hall East Coast @ EXPO; Level: International Series; Prize: $15,000; Format: 64MS/32WS/32MD/32WD/32XD | (Chinese Taipei) Hsieh Mi-yen (Chinese Taipei) Yu Chien-hui | (Australia) Laudya Chelsea Griselda (Australia) Nozomi Shimizu |
| 2 March | Singapore International: Dates: 3–8 March; Host: Singapore, Singapore; Venue: Singapore Badminton Hall East Coast @ EXPO; Level: International Series; Prize: $15,000; Format: 64MS/32WS/32MD/32WD/32XD | Score: 21–18, 19–21, 21–16 | |
| 2 March | Singapore International: Dates: 3–8 March; Host: Singapore, Singapore; Venue: Singapore Badminton Hall East Coast @ EXPO; Level: International Series; Prize: $15,000; Format: 64MS/32WS/32MD/32WD/32XD | (Indonesia) Muhammad Al Farizi (Indonesia) Jessica Maya Rismawardani | (Malaysia) Loo Bing Kun (Malaysia) Noraqilah Maisarah |
| 2 March | Singapore International: Dates: 3–8 March; Host: Singapore, Singapore; Venue: Singapore Badminton Hall East Coast @ EXPO; Level: International Series; Prize: $15,000; Format: 64MS/32WS/32MD/32WD/32XD | Score: 21–14, 21–23, 21–12 | |
| 2 March | Portugal International: Dates: 4–8 March; Host: Caldas da Rainha, Portugal; Venue: Badminton High Performance Sports Centre; Level: International Series; Prize: $10,000; Format: 32MS/32WS/32MD/32WD/32XD | (Denmark) Jeppe Bruun | (Denmark) Jakob Houe |
| 2 March | Portugal International: Dates: 4–8 March; Host: Caldas da Rainha, Portugal; Venue: Badminton High Performance Sports Centre; Level: International Series; Prize: $10,000; Format: 32MS/32WS/32MD/32WD/32XD | Score: 8–21, 21–13, 21–17 | |
| 2 March | Portugal International: Dates: 4–8 March; Host: Caldas da Rainha, Portugal; Venue: Badminton High Performance Sports Centre; Level: International Series; Prize: $10,000; Format: 32MS/32WS/32MD/32WD/32XD | (Brazil) Juliana Viana Vieira | (Denmark) Frederikke Østergaard |
| 2 March | Portugal International: Dates: 4–8 March; Host: Caldas da Rainha, Portugal; Venue: Badminton High Performance Sports Centre; Level: International Series; Prize: $10,000; Format: 32MS/32WS/32MD/32WD/32XD | Score: 12–21, 21–11, 21–16 | |
| 2 March | Portugal International: Dates: 4–8 March; Host: Caldas da Rainha, Portugal; Venue: Badminton High Performance Sports Centre; Level: International Series; Prize: $10,000; Format: 32MS/32WS/32MD/32WD/32XD | (Denmark) Robert Nebel (Denmark) Jeppe Søby | (France) Natan Begga (France) Grégoire Deschamp |
| 2 March | Portugal International: Dates: 4–8 March; Host: Caldas da Rainha, Portugal; Venue: Badminton High Performance Sports Centre; Level: International Series; Prize: $10,000; Format: 32MS/32WS/32MD/32WD/32XD | Score: 21–18, 21–16 | |
| 2 March | Portugal International: Dates: 4–8 March; Host: Caldas da Rainha, Portugal; Venue: Badminton High Performance Sports Centre; Level: International Series; Prize: $10,000; Format: 32MS/32WS/32MD/32WD/32XD | (Chinese Taipei) Lin Chih-chun (Chinese Taipei) Yang Chu-yun | (France) Agathe Cuevas (France) Kathell Desmots-Chacun |
| 2 March | Portugal International: Dates: 4–8 March; Host: Caldas da Rainha, Portugal; Venue: Badminton High Performance Sports Centre; Level: International Series; Prize: $10,000; Format: 32MS/32WS/32MD/32WD/32XD | Score: 28–26, 21–10 | |
| 2 March | Portugal International: Dates: 4–8 March; Host: Caldas da Rainha, Portugal; Venue: Badminton High Performance Sports Centre; Level: International Series; Prize: $10,000; Format: 32MS/32WS/32MD/32WD/32XD | (Chinese Taipei) Wu Hsuan-yi (Chinese Taipei) Yang Chu-yun | (France) Natan Begga (France) Elsa Jacob |
| 2 March | Portugal International: Dates: 4–8 March; Host: Caldas da Rainha, Portugal; Venue: Badminton High Performance Sports Centre; Level: International Series; Prize: $10,000; Format: 32MS/32WS/32MD/32WD/32XD | Score: 21–18, 21–14 | |
| 9 March | Swiss Open (Draw): Dates: 10–15 March; Host: Basel, Switzerland; Venue: St. Jakobshalle; Level: Super 300; Prize: $250,000; Format: 32MS/32WS/32MD/32WD/32XD | (Japan) Yushi Tanaka | (Indonesia) Alwi Farhan |
| 9 March | Swiss Open (Draw): Dates: 10–15 March; Host: Basel, Switzerland; Venue: St. Jakobshalle; Level: Super 300; Prize: $250,000; Format: 32MS/32WS/32MD/32WD/32XD | Score: 21–18, 21–12 | |
| 9 March | Swiss Open (Draw): Dates: 10–15 March; Host: Basel, Switzerland; Venue: St. Jakobshalle; Level: Super 300; Prize: $250,000; Format: 32MS/32WS/32MD/32WD/32XD | (Thailand) Supanida Katethong | (Indonesia) Putri Kusuma Wardani |
| 9 March | Swiss Open (Draw): Dates: 10–15 March; Host: Basel, Switzerland; Venue: St. Jakobshalle; Level: Super 300; Prize: $250,000; Format: 32MS/32WS/32MD/32WD/32XD | Score: 21–11, 21–15 | |
| 9 March | Swiss Open (Draw): Dates: 10–15 March; Host: Basel, Switzerland; Venue: St. Jakobshalle; Level: Super 300; Prize: $250,000; Format: 32MS/32WS/32MD/32WD/32XD | (Chinese Taipei) Lee Fang-chih (Chinese Taipei) Lee Fang-jen | (Denmark) Daniel Lundgaard (Denmark) Mads Vestergaard |
| 9 March | Swiss Open (Draw): Dates: 10–15 March; Host: Basel, Switzerland; Venue: St. Jakobshalle; Level: Super 300; Prize: $250,000; Format: 32MS/32WS/32MD/32WD/32XD | Score: 21–18, 21–13 | |
| 9 March | Swiss Open (Draw): Dates: 10–15 March; Host: Basel, Switzerland; Venue: St. Jakobshalle; Level: Super 300; Prize: $250,000; Format: 32MS/32WS/32MD/32WD/32XD | (China) Li Yijing (China) Wang Yiduo | (China) Jia Yifan (China) Zhang Shuxian |
| 9 March | Swiss Open (Draw): Dates: 10–15 March; Host: Basel, Switzerland; Venue: St. Jakobshalle; Level: Super 300; Prize: $250,000; Format: 32MS/32WS/32MD/32WD/32XD | Score: 21–10, 22–20 | |
| 9 March | Swiss Open (Draw): Dates: 10–15 March; Host: Basel, Switzerland; Venue: St. Jakobshalle; Level: Super 300; Prize: $250,000; Format: 32MS/32WS/32MD/32WD/32XD | (China) Cheng Xing (China) Zhang Chi | (China) Zhu Yijun (China) Li Qian |
| 9 March | Swiss Open (Draw): Dates: 10–15 March; Host: Basel, Switzerland; Venue: St. Jakobshalle; Level: Super 300; Prize: $250,000; Format: 32MS/32WS/32MD/32WD/32XD | Score: 20–22, 21–15, 22–20 | |
| 9 March | Ruichang China Masters (Draw): Dates: 10–15 March; Host: Ruichang, China; Venue: Ruichang Sports Park Gym; Level: Super 100; Prize: $120,000; Format: 64MS/32WS/32MD/32WD/32XD | (China) Sun Chao | (Indonesia) Prahdiska Bagas Shujiwo |
| 9 March | Ruichang China Masters (Draw): Dates: 10–15 March; Host: Ruichang, China; Venue: Ruichang Sports Park Gym; Level: Super 100; Prize: $120,000; Format: 64MS/32WS/32MD/32WD/32XD | Score: 21–14, 21–11 | |
| 9 March | Ruichang China Masters (Draw): Dates: 10–15 March; Host: Ruichang, China; Venue: Ruichang Sports Park Gym; Level: Super 100; Prize: $120,000; Format: 64MS/32WS/32MD/32WD/32XD | (China) Xu Wenjing | (South Korea) Kim Min-ji |
| 9 March | Ruichang China Masters (Draw): Dates: 10–15 March; Host: Ruichang, China; Venue: Ruichang Sports Park Gym; Level: Super 100; Prize: $120,000; Format: 64MS/32WS/32MD/32WD/32XD | Score: 21–14, 21–12 | |
| 9 March | Ruichang China Masters (Draw): Dates: 10–15 March; Host: Ruichang, China; Venue: Ruichang Sports Park Gym; Level: Super 100; Prize: $120,000; Format: 64MS/32WS/32MD/32WD/32XD | (China) He Jiting (China) Ren Xiangyu | (China) Lin Yifan (China) Yang Jiayi |
| 9 March | Ruichang China Masters (Draw): Dates: 10–15 March; Host: Ruichang, China; Venue: Ruichang Sports Park Gym; Level: Super 100; Prize: $120,000; Format: 64MS/32WS/32MD/32WD/32XD | Score: 21–12, 16–21, 23–21 | |
| 9 March | Ruichang China Masters (Draw): Dates: 10–15 March; Host: Ruichang, China; Venue: Ruichang Sports Park Gym; Level: Super 100; Prize: $120,000; Format: 64MS/32WS/32MD/32WD/32XD | (China) Liao Lixi (China) Shen Shiyao | (China) Chen Fanshutian (China) Liu Jiayue |
| 9 March | Ruichang China Masters (Draw): Dates: 10–15 March; Host: Ruichang, China; Venue: Ruichang Sports Park Gym; Level: Super 100; Prize: $120,000; Format: 64MS/32WS/32MD/32WD/32XD | Score: 20–22, 22–20, 21–18 | |
| 9 March | Ruichang China Masters (Draw): Dates: 10–15 March; Host: Ruichang, China; Venue: Ruichang Sports Park Gym; Level: Super 100; Prize: $120,000; Format: 64MS/32WS/32MD/32WD/32XD | (China) Li Hongyi (China) Huang Kexin | (China) Shen Xuanyao (China) Tang Ruizhi |
| 9 March | Ruichang China Masters (Draw): Dates: 10–15 March; Host: Ruichang, China; Venue: Ruichang Sports Park Gym; Level: Super 100; Prize: $120,000; Format: 64MS/32WS/32MD/32WD/32XD | Score: 21–15, 21–19 | |
| 9 March | Sri Lanka International (cancelled): Dates: 9–15 March; Host: Colombo, Sri Lanka; Venue: TBD; Level: International Series; Prize: $10,000; Format: 32MS/32WS/32MD/32WD/32XD | | |
| 9 March | Sri Lanka International (cancelled): Dates: 9–15 March; Host: Colombo, Sri Lanka; Venue: TBD; Level: International Series; Prize: $10,000; Format: 32MS/32WS/32MD/32WD/32XD | Score: | |
| 9 March | Sri Lanka International (cancelled): Dates: 9–15 March; Host: Colombo, Sri Lanka; Venue: TBD; Level: International Series; Prize: $10,000; Format: 32MS/32WS/32MD/32WD/32XD | Score: | |
| 9 March | Sri Lanka International (cancelled): Dates: 9–15 March; Host: Colombo, Sri Lanka; Venue: TBD; Level: International Series; Prize: $10,000; Format: 32MS/32WS/32MD/32WD/32XD | Score: | |
| 9 March | Sri Lanka International (cancelled): Dates: 9–15 March; Host: Colombo, Sri Lanka; Venue: TBD; Level: International Series; Prize: $10,000; Format: 32MS/32WS/32MD/32WD/32XD | Score: | |
| 9 March | Sri Lanka International (cancelled): Dates: 9–15 March; Host: Colombo, Sri Lanka; Venue: TBD; Level: International Series; Prize: $10,000; Format: 32MS/32WS/32MD/32WD/32XD | Score: | |
| 9 March | Giraldilla International: Dates: 10–15 March; Host: Havana, Cuba; Venue: Coliseo de la Ciudad Deportiva; Level: Future Series; Format: 32MS/32WS/16MD/16WD/32XD | (El Salvador) Uriel Canjura | (Portugal) Bruno Carvalho |
| 9 March | Giraldilla International: Dates: 10–15 March; Host: Havana, Cuba; Venue: Coliseo de la Ciudad Deportiva; Level: Future Series; Format: 32MS/32WS/16MD/16WD/32XD | Score: 21–15, 21–12 | |
| 9 March | Giraldilla International: Dates: 10–15 March; Host: Havana, Cuba; Venue: Coliseo de la Ciudad Deportiva; Level: Future Series; Format: 32MS/32WS/16MD/16WD/32XD | (Cuba) Taymara Oropesa | (Malta) Francesca Clark |
| 9 March | Giraldilla International: Dates: 10–15 March; Host: Havana, Cuba; Venue: Coliseo de la Ciudad Deportiva; Level: Future Series; Format: 32MS/32WS/16MD/16WD/32XD | Score: 21–7, 21–6 | |
| 9 March | Giraldilla International: Dates: 10–15 March; Host: Havana, Cuba; Venue: Coliseo de la Ciudad Deportiva; Level: Future Series; Format: 32MS/32WS/16MD/16WD/32XD | (United States) Kathiravun Manivannan (United States) Mukil Nambikumar | (El Salvador) Uriel Canjura (El Salvador) Manuel Mejía |
| 9 March | Giraldilla International: Dates: 10–15 March; Host: Havana, Cuba; Venue: Coliseo de la Ciudad Deportiva; Level: Future Series; Format: 32MS/32WS/16MD/16WD/32XD | Score: 21–16, 23–25, 21–10 | |
| 9 March | Giraldilla International: Dates: 10–15 March; Host: Havana, Cuba; Venue: Coliseo de la Ciudad Deportiva; Level: Future Series; Format: 32MS/32WS/16MD/16WD/32XD | (Dominican Republic) Clarisa Pie (Dominican Republic) Nairoby Abigail Jiménez | (Cuba) Leyanis Contreras (Cuba) Taymara Oropesa |
| 9 March | Giraldilla International: Dates: 10–15 March; Host: Havana, Cuba; Venue: Coliseo de la Ciudad Deportiva; Level: Future Series; Format: 32MS/32WS/16MD/16WD/32XD | Score: 21–10, 21–15 | |
| 9 March | Giraldilla International: Dates: 10–15 March; Host: Havana, Cuba; Venue: Coliseo de la Ciudad Deportiva; Level: Future Series; Format: 32MS/32WS/16MD/16WD/32XD | (Cuba) Roberto Herrera (Cuba) Taymara Oropesa | (Dominican Republic) Yonatan Linarez (Dominican Republic) Nairoby Abigail Jiménez |
| 9 March | Giraldilla International: Dates: 10–15 March; Host: Havana, Cuba; Venue: Coliseo de la Ciudad Deportiva; Level: Future Series; Format: 32MS/32WS/16MD/16WD/32XD | Score: 26–24, 21–14 | |
| 16 March | Orléans Masters (Draw): Dates: 17–22 March; Host: Orléans, France; Venue: Palais des Sports; Level: Super 300; Prize: $250,000; Format: 32MS/32WS/32MD/32WD/32XD | (France) Alex Lanier | (France) Toma Junior Popov |
| 16 March | Orléans Masters (Draw): Dates: 17–22 March; Host: Orléans, France; Venue: Palais des Sports; Level: Super 300; Prize: $250,000; Format: 32MS/32WS/32MD/32WD/32XD | Score: 21–11, 21–13 | |
| 16 March | Orléans Masters (Draw): Dates: 17–22 March; Host: Orléans, France; Venue: Palais des Sports; Level: Super 300; Prize: $250,000; Format: 32MS/32WS/32MD/32WD/32XD | (Japan) Nozomi Okuhara | (Thailand) Pitchamon Opatniputh |
| 16 March | Orléans Masters (Draw): Dates: 17–22 March; Host: Orléans, France; Venue: Palais des Sports; Level: Super 300; Prize: $250,000; Format: 32MS/32WS/32MD/32WD/32XD | Score: 21–15, 21–15 | |
| 16 March | Orléans Masters (Draw): Dates: 17–22 March; Host: Orléans, France; Venue: Palais des Sports; Level: Super 300; Prize: $250,000; Format: 32MS/32WS/32MD/32WD/32XD | (China) Hu Keyuan (China) Lin Xiangyi | (Japan) Hiroki Okamura (Japan) Kyohei Yamashita |
| 16 March | Orléans Masters (Draw): Dates: 17–22 March; Host: Orléans, France; Venue: Palais des Sports; Level: Super 300; Prize: $250,000; Format: 32MS/32WS/32MD/32WD/32XD | Score: 21–19, 21–14 | |
| 16 March | Orléans Masters (Draw): Dates: 17–22 March; Host: Orléans, France; Venue: Palais des Sports; Level: Super 300; Prize: $250,000; Format: 32MS/32WS/32MD/32WD/32XD | (Japan) Sumire Nakade (Japan) Miyu Takahashi | (Chinese Taipei) Lin Chih-chun (Chinese Taipei) Yang Chu-yun |
| 16 March | Orléans Masters (Draw): Dates: 17–22 March; Host: Orléans, France; Venue: Palais des Sports; Level: Super 300; Prize: $250,000; Format: 32MS/32WS/32MD/32WD/32XD | Score: 22–20, 12–21, 21–18 | |
| 16 March | Orléans Masters (Draw): Dates: 17–22 March; Host: Orléans, France; Venue: Palais des Sports; Level: Super 300; Prize: $250,000; Format: 32MS/32WS/32MD/32WD/32XD | (France) Thom Gicquel (France) Delphine Delrue | (Denmark) Mathias Christiansen (Denmark) Alexandra Bøje |
| 16 March | Orléans Masters (Draw): Dates: 17–22 March; Host: Orléans, France; Venue: Palais des Sports; Level: Super 300; Prize: $250,000; Format: 32MS/32WS/32MD/32WD/32XD | Score: 21–19, 21–13 | |
| 16 March | Sri Lanka International (cancelled): Dates: 16–22 March; Host: Colombo, Sri Lanka; Venue: TBD; Level: International Challenge; Prize: $20,000; Format: 32MS/32WS/32MD/32WD/32XD | | |
| 16 March | Sri Lanka International (cancelled): Dates: 16–22 March; Host: Colombo, Sri Lanka; Venue: TBD; Level: International Challenge; Prize: $20,000; Format: 32MS/32WS/32MD/32WD/32XD | Score: | |
| 16 March | Sri Lanka International (cancelled): Dates: 16–22 March; Host: Colombo, Sri Lanka; Venue: TBD; Level: International Challenge; Prize: $20,000; Format: 32MS/32WS/32MD/32WD/32XD | Score: | |
| 16 March | Sri Lanka International (cancelled): Dates: 16–22 March; Host: Colombo, Sri Lanka; Venue: TBD; Level: International Challenge; Prize: $20,000; Format: 32MS/32WS/32MD/32WD/32XD | Score: | |
| 16 March | Sri Lanka International (cancelled): Dates: 16–22 March; Host: Colombo, Sri Lanka; Venue: TBD; Level: International Challenge; Prize: $20,000; Format: 32MS/32WS/32MD/32WD/32XD | Score: | |
| 16 March | Sri Lanka International (cancelled): Dates: 16–22 March; Host: Colombo, Sri Lanka; Venue: TBD; Level: International Challenge; Prize: $20,000; Format: 32MS/32WS/32MD/32WD/32XD | Score: | |
| 16 March | Polish Open: Dates: 18–22 March; Host: Józefosław, Poland; Venue: LAVO Sport Centre; Level: International Challenge; Prize: $20,000; Format: 32MS/32WS/32MD/32WD/32XD | (Singapore) Jason Teh | (Japan) Koshiro Moriguchi |
| 16 March | Polish Open: Dates: 18–22 March; Host: Józefosław, Poland; Venue: LAVO Sport Centre; Level: International Challenge; Prize: $20,000; Format: 32MS/32WS/32MD/32WD/32XD | Score: 21–9, 21–10 | |
| 16 March | Polish Open: Dates: 18–22 March; Host: Józefosław, Poland; Venue: LAVO Sport Centre; Level: International Challenge; Prize: $20,000; Format: 32MS/32WS/32MD/32WD/32XD | (India) Unnati Hooda | (Ukraine) Polina Buhrova |
| 16 March | Polish Open: Dates: 18–22 March; Host: Józefosław, Poland; Venue: LAVO Sport Centre; Level: International Challenge; Prize: $20,000; Format: 32MS/32WS/32MD/32WD/32XD | Score: 10–21, 21–15, 21–8 | |
| 16 March | Polish Open: Dates: 18–22 March; Host: Józefosław, Poland; Venue: LAVO Sport Centre; Level: International Challenge; Prize: $20,000; Format: 32MS/32WS/32MD/32WD/32XD | (Germany) Malik Bourakkadi (Germany) Kenneth Neumann | (England) Robin Harper (England) Harry Wakefield |
| 16 March | Polish Open: Dates: 18–22 March; Host: Józefosław, Poland; Venue: LAVO Sport Centre; Level: International Challenge; Prize: $20,000; Format: 32MS/32WS/32MD/32WD/32XD | Score: 21–18, 21–8 | |
| 16 March | Polish Open: Dates: 18–22 March; Host: Józefosław, Poland; Venue: LAVO Sport Centre; Level: International Challenge; Prize: $20,000; Format: 32MS/32WS/32MD/32WD/32XD | (England) Abbygael Harris (England) Lizzie Tolman | (Japan) Rui Kiyama (Japan) Sona Yonemoto |
| 16 March | Polish Open: Dates: 18–22 March; Host: Józefosław, Poland; Venue: LAVO Sport Centre; Level: International Challenge; Prize: $20,000; Format: 32MS/32WS/32MD/32WD/32XD | Score: 23–21, 21–16 | |
| 16 March | Polish Open: Dates: 18–22 March; Host: Józefosław, Poland; Venue: LAVO Sport Centre; Level: International Challenge; Prize: $20,000; Format: 32MS/32WS/32MD/32WD/32XD | (Japan) Hiroki Midorikawa (Japan) Nami Matsuyama | (Denmark) Jeppe Søby (Denmark) Sofie Røjkjær |
| 16 March | Polish Open: Dates: 18–22 March; Host: Józefosław, Poland; Venue: LAVO Sport Centre; Level: International Challenge; Prize: $20,000; Format: 32MS/32WS/32MD/32WD/32XD | Score: 21–11, 21–13 | |
| 23 March | Vietnam International: Dates: 24–29 March; Host: Hanoi, Vietnam; Venue: Tay Ho District Stadium; Level: International Challenge; Prize: $20,000; Format: 64MS/32WS/32MD/32WD/32XD | (Indonesia) Richie Duta Richardo | (Chinese Taipei) Cheng Ju-sheng |
| 23 March | Vietnam International: Dates: 24–29 March; Host: Hanoi, Vietnam; Venue: Tay Ho District Stadium; Level: International Challenge; Prize: $20,000; Format: 64MS/32WS/32MD/32WD/32XD | Score: 21–13, 21–14 | |
| 23 March | Vietnam International: Dates: 24–29 March; Host: Hanoi, Vietnam; Venue: Tay Ho District Stadium; Level: International Challenge; Prize: $20,000; Format: 64MS/32WS/32MD/32WD/32XD | (India) Rakshitha Ramraj | (Hong Kong) Lo Sin Yan |
| 23 March | Vietnam International: Dates: 24–29 March; Host: Hanoi, Vietnam; Venue: Tay Ho District Stadium; Level: International Challenge; Prize: $20,000; Format: 64MS/32WS/32MD/32WD/32XD | Score: 16–21, 21–15, 21–16 | |
| 23 March | Vietnam International: Dates: 24–29 March; Host: Hanoi, Vietnam; Venue: Tay Ho District Stadium; Level: International Challenge; Prize: $20,000; Format: 64MS/32WS/32MD/32WD/32XD | (Chinese Taipei) Huang Tsung-i (Chinese Taipei) Lin Ting-yu | (India) Krishna Prasad Garaga (India) Pruthvi Roy |
| 23 March | Vietnam International: Dates: 24–29 March; Host: Hanoi, Vietnam; Venue: Tay Ho District Stadium; Level: International Challenge; Prize: $20,000; Format: 64MS/32WS/32MD/32WD/32XD | Score: 26–24, 17–21, 21–18 | |
| 23 March | Vietnam International: Dates: 24–29 March; Host: Hanoi, Vietnam; Venue: Tay Ho District Stadium; Level: International Challenge; Prize: $20,000; Format: 64MS/32WS/32MD/32WD/32XD | (Australia) Gronya Somerville (Canada) Josephine Wu | (Japan) Miki Kanehiro (Japan) Yuna Kato |
| 23 March | Vietnam International: Dates: 24–29 March; Host: Hanoi, Vietnam; Venue: Tay Ho District Stadium; Level: International Challenge; Prize: $20,000; Format: 64MS/32WS/32MD/32WD/32XD | Score: 16–21, 21–19, 24–22 | |
| 23 March | Vietnam International: Dates: 24–29 March; Host: Hanoi, Vietnam; Venue: Tay Ho District Stadium; Level: International Challenge; Prize: $20,000; Format: 64MS/32WS/32MD/32WD/32XD | (Hong Kong) Chan Yin Chak (Hong Kong) Ng Tsz Yau | (Japan) Hiroki Midorikawa (Japan) Nami Matsuyama |
| 23 March | Vietnam International: Dates: 24–29 March; Host: Hanoi, Vietnam; Venue: Tay Ho District Stadium; Level: International Challenge; Prize: $20,000; Format: 64MS/32WS/32MD/32WD/32XD | Score: 14–17 (retired) | |
| 23 March | Brazil International: Dates: 24–29 March; Host: São Paulo, Brazil; Venue: Antonio Prado Júnior Gymnasium; Level: International Challenge; Prize: $20,000; Format: 64MS/64WS/32MD/32WD/32XD | (Brazil) Jonathan Matias | (Japan) Akira Hanada |
| 23 March | Brazil International: Dates: 24–29 March; Host: São Paulo, Brazil; Venue: Antonio Prado Júnior Gymnasium; Level: International Challenge; Prize: $20,000; Format: 64MS/64WS/32MD/32WD/32XD | Score: 17–21, 21–16, 21–14 | |
| 23 March | Brazil International: Dates: 24–29 March; Host: São Paulo, Brazil; Venue: Antonio Prado Júnior Gymnasium; Level: International Challenge; Prize: $20,000; Format: 64MS/64WS/32MD/32WD/32XD | (Brazil) Juliana Viana Vieira | (Canada) Rachel Chan |
| 23 March | Brazil International: Dates: 24–29 March; Host: São Paulo, Brazil; Venue: Antonio Prado Júnior Gymnasium; Level: International Challenge; Prize: $20,000; Format: 64MS/64WS/32MD/32WD/32XD | Score: 16–21, 21–16, 21–15 | |
| 23 March | Brazil International: Dates: 24–29 March; Host: São Paulo, Brazil; Venue: Antonio Prado Júnior Gymnasium; Level: International Challenge; Prize: $20,000; Format: 64MS/64WS/32MD/32WD/32XD | (Japan) Takuto Goto (Japan) Yuta Oku | (Canada) Kevin Lee (Canada) Ty Alexander Lindeman |
| 23 March | Brazil International: Dates: 24–29 March; Host: São Paulo, Brazil; Venue: Antonio Prado Júnior Gymnasium; Level: International Challenge; Prize: $20,000; Format: 64MS/64WS/32MD/32WD/32XD | Score: 21–17, 21–17 | |
| 23 March | Brazil International: Dates: 24–29 March; Host: São Paulo, Brazil; Venue: Antonio Prado Júnior Gymnasium; Level: International Challenge; Prize: $20,000; Format: 64MS/64WS/32MD/32WD/32XD | (Brazil) Jaqueline Lima (Brazil) Sâmia Lima | (Brazil) Sânia Lima (Brazil) Juliana Viana Vieira |
| 23 March | Brazil International: Dates: 24–29 March; Host: São Paulo, Brazil; Venue: Antonio Prado Júnior Gymnasium; Level: International Challenge; Prize: $20,000; Format: 64MS/64WS/32MD/32WD/32XD | Score: 13–21, 21–18, 21–14 | |
| 23 March | Brazil International: Dates: 24–29 March; Host: São Paulo, Brazil; Venue: Antonio Prado Júnior Gymnasium; Level: International Challenge; Prize: $20,000; Format: 64MS/64WS/32MD/32WD/32XD | (Brazil) Davi Silva (Brazil) Sânia Lima | (Brazil) Fabrício Farias (Brazil) Jaqueline Lima |
| 23 March | Brazil International: Dates: 24–29 March; Host: São Paulo, Brazil; Venue: Antonio Prado Júnior Gymnasium; Level: International Challenge; Prize: $20,000; Format: 64MS/64WS/32MD/32WD/32XD | Score: 16–21, 21–19, 21–12 | |
| 30 March | Cuba International: Dates: 31 March – 5 April; Host: Havana, Cuba; Venue: Coliseo de la Ciudad Deportiva; Level: International Series; Prize: $10,000; Format: 32MS/32WS/16MD/16WD/16XD | (India) Nithin Raghavendar | (Cuba) Roberto Herrera |
| 30 March | Cuba International: Dates: 31 March – 5 April; Host: Havana, Cuba; Venue: Coliseo de la Ciudad Deportiva; Level: International Series; Prize: $10,000; Format: 32MS/32WS/16MD/16WD/16XD | Score: 17–21, 21–13, 23–21 | |
| 30 March | Cuba International: Dates: 31 March – 5 April; Host: Havana, Cuba; Venue: Coliseo de la Ciudad Deportiva; Level: International Series; Prize: $10,000; Format: 32MS/32WS/16MD/16WD/16XD | (United States) Ishika Jaiswal | (Peru) Inés Castillo |
| 30 March | Cuba International: Dates: 31 March – 5 April; Host: Havana, Cuba; Venue: Coliseo de la Ciudad Deportiva; Level: International Series; Prize: $10,000; Format: 32MS/32WS/16MD/16WD/16XD | Score: 21–10, 21–6 | |
| 30 March | Cuba International: Dates: 31 March – 5 April; Host: Havana, Cuba; Venue: Coliseo de la Ciudad Deportiva; Level: International Series; Prize: $10,000; Format: 32MS/32WS/16MD/16WD/16XD | (Mexico) Nestor González (Mexico) Juan Pablo Montoya | (Dominican Republic) Victor Ovalles (Dominican Republic) Ernick Zorrilla |
| 30 March | Cuba International: Dates: 31 March – 5 April; Host: Havana, Cuba; Venue: Coliseo de la Ciudad Deportiva; Level: International Series; Prize: $10,000; Format: 32MS/32WS/16MD/16WD/16XD | Score: 21–15, 21–10 | |
| 30 March | Cuba International: Dates: 31 March – 5 April; Host: Havana, Cuba; Venue: Coliseo de la Ciudad Deportiva; Level: International Series; Prize: $10,000; Format: 32MS/32WS/16MD/16WD/16XD | (Cuba) Leyanis Contreras (Cuba) Taymara Oropesa | (Dominican Republic) Clarisa Pie (Dominican Republic) Nairoby Abigail Jiménez |
| 30 March | Cuba International: Dates: 31 March – 5 April; Host: Havana, Cuba; Venue: Coliseo de la Ciudad Deportiva; Level: International Series; Prize: $10,000; Format: 32MS/32WS/16MD/16WD/16XD | Score: 21–17, 13–21, 21–18 | |
| 30 March | Cuba International: Dates: 31 March – 5 April; Host: Havana, Cuba; Venue: Coliseo de la Ciudad Deportiva; Level: International Series; Prize: $10,000; Format: 32MS/32WS/16MD/16WD/16XD | (Cuba) Roberto Herrera (Cuba) Taymara Oropesa | (Mexico) Juan Pablo Montoya (Mexico) Cecilia Madera |
| 30 March | Cuba International: Dates: 31 March – 5 April; Host: Havana, Cuba; Venue: Coliseo de la Ciudad Deportiva; Level: International Series; Prize: $10,000; Format: 32MS/32WS/16MD/16WD/16XD | Score: 21–18, 21–11 | |
| 30 March | Hungarian Future Series: Dates: 1–4 April; Host: Pécs, Hungary; Venue: MASE Badminton Centrum; Level: Future Series; Format: 32MS/32WS/32MD/32WD/32XD | (Denmark) Christopher Vittoriani | (Italy) Enrico Baroni |
| 30 March | Hungarian Future Series: Dates: 1–4 April; Host: Pécs, Hungary; Venue: MASE Badminton Centrum; Level: Future Series; Format: 32MS/32WS/32MD/32WD/32XD | Score: 21–13, 21–16 | |
| 30 March | Hungarian Future Series: Dates: 1–4 April; Host: Pécs, Hungary; Venue: MASE Badminton Centrum; Level: Future Series; Format: 32MS/32WS/32MD/32WD/32XD | (Bulgaria) Hristomira Popovska | (Finland) Nella Nyqvist |
| 30 March | Hungarian Future Series: Dates: 1–4 April; Host: Pécs, Hungary; Venue: MASE Badminton Centrum; Level: Future Series; Format: 32MS/32WS/32MD/32WD/32XD | Score: 21–19, 21–17 | |
| 30 March | Hungarian Future Series: Dates: 1–4 April; Host: Pécs, Hungary; Venue: MASE Badminton Centrum; Level: Future Series; Format: 32MS/32WS/32MD/32WD/32XD | (Denmark) Sebastian Mønster Andersen (Denmark) Birk Norman | (Germany) Danial Marzuan (Germany) Aaron Sonnenschein |
| 30 March | Hungarian Future Series: Dates: 1–4 April; Host: Pécs, Hungary; Venue: MASE Badminton Centrum; Level: Future Series; Format: 32MS/32WS/32MD/32WD/32XD | Score: 22–20, 21–18 | |
| 30 March | Hungarian Future Series: Dates: 1–4 April; Host: Pécs, Hungary; Venue: MASE Badminton Centrum; Level: Future Series; Format: 32MS/32WS/32MD/32WD/32XD | (Denmark) Anne Fuglsang (Denmark) Laura Fløj Thomsen | (Poland) Julia Piwowar (Poland) Ulyana Volskaya |
| 30 March | Hungarian Future Series: Dates: 1–4 April; Host: Pécs, Hungary; Venue: MASE Badminton Centrum; Level: Future Series; Format: 32MS/32WS/32MD/32WD/32XD | Score: 21–14, 24–22 | |
| 30 March | Hungarian Future Series: Dates: 1–4 April; Host: Pécs, Hungary; Venue: MASE Badminton Centrum; Level: Future Series; Format: 32MS/32WS/32MD/32WD/32XD | (Germany) Jan Colin Völker (Germany) Emma Moszczynski | (Slovenia) Miha Ivančič (Slovenia) Anja Jordan |
| 30 March | Hungarian Future Series: Dates: 1–4 April; Host: Pécs, Hungary; Venue: MASE Badminton Centrum; Level: Future Series; Format: 32MS/32WS/32MD/32WD/32XD | Score: 21–13, 23–21 | |

=== April ===
| Week commencing | Tournament | Champions | Runners-up |
|---|---|---|---|
| 6 April | European Badminton Championships (Draw): Dates: 6–12 April; Host: Huelva, Spain; Venue: Palacio de los Deportes Carolina Marín; Level: Continental Individual Championships; Format: 64MS/64WS/32MD/32WD/32XD | (France) Christo Popov | (Denmark) Anders Antonsen |
| 6 April | European Badminton Championships (Draw): Dates: 6–12 April; Host: Huelva, Spain; Venue: Palacio de los Deportes Carolina Marín; Level: Continental Individual Championships; Format: 64MS/64WS/32MD/32WD/32XD | Score: 21–12, 21–19 | |
| 6 April | European Badminton Championships (Draw): Dates: 6–12 April; Host: Huelva, Spain; Venue: Palacio de los Deportes Carolina Marín; Level: Continental Individual Championships; Format: 64MS/64WS/32MD/32WD/32XD | (Scotland) Kirsty Gilmour | (Denmark) Line Kjærsfeldt |
| 6 April | European Badminton Championships (Draw): Dates: 6–12 April; Host: Huelva, Spain; Venue: Palacio de los Deportes Carolina Marín; Level: Continental Individual Championships; Format: 64MS/64WS/32MD/32WD/32XD | Score: 21–17, 21–15 | |
| 6 April | European Badminton Championships (Draw): Dates: 6–12 April; Host: Huelva, Spain; Venue: Palacio de los Deportes Carolina Marín; Level: Continental Individual Championships; Format: 64MS/64WS/32MD/32WD/32XD | (England) Ben Lane (England) Sean Vendy | (France) Christo Popov (France) Toma Junior Popov |
| 6 April | European Badminton Championships (Draw): Dates: 6–12 April; Host: Huelva, Spain; Venue: Palacio de los Deportes Carolina Marín; Level: Continental Individual Championships; Format: 64MS/64WS/32MD/32WD/32XD | Score: 21–15, 21–16 | |
| 6 April | European Badminton Championships (Draw): Dates: 6–12 April; Host: Huelva, Spain; Venue: Palacio de los Deportes Carolina Marín; Level: Continental Individual Championships; Format: 64MS/64WS/32MD/32WD/32XD | (Bulgaria) Gabriela Stoeva (Bulgaria) Stefani Stoeva | (Turkey) Bengisu Erçetin (Turkey) Nazlıcan İnci |
| 6 April | European Badminton Championships (Draw): Dates: 6–12 April; Host: Huelva, Spain; Venue: Palacio de los Deportes Carolina Marín; Level: Continental Individual Championships; Format: 64MS/64WS/32MD/32WD/32XD | Score: 21–11, 21–17 | |
| 6 April | European Badminton Championships (Draw): Dates: 6–12 April; Host: Huelva, Spain; Venue: Palacio de los Deportes Carolina Marín; Level: Continental Individual Championships; Format: 64MS/64WS/32MD/32WD/32XD | (Denmark) Mathias Christiansen (Denmark) Alexandra Bøje | (England) Callum Hemming (England) Estelle van Leeuwen |
| 6 April | European Badminton Championships (Draw): Dates: 6–12 April; Host: Huelva, Spain; Venue: Palacio de los Deportes Carolina Marín; Level: Continental Individual Championships; Format: 64MS/64WS/32MD/32WD/32XD | Score: 21–19, 21–14 | |
| 6 April | Badminton Asia Championships (Draw): Dates: 7–12 April; Host: Ningbo, China; Venue: Ningbo Olympic Sports Center Gymnasium; Level: Continental Individual Championships; Format: 32MS/32WS/32MD/32WD/32XD | (China) Shi Yuqi | (India) Ayush Shetty |
| 6 April | Badminton Asia Championships (Draw): Dates: 7–12 April; Host: Ningbo, China; Venue: Ningbo Olympic Sports Center Gymnasium; Level: Continental Individual Championships; Format: 32MS/32WS/32MD/32WD/32XD | Score: 21–8, 21–10 | |
| 6 April | Badminton Asia Championships (Draw): Dates: 7–12 April; Host: Ningbo, China; Venue: Ningbo Olympic Sports Center Gymnasium; Level: Continental Individual Championships; Format: 32MS/32WS/32MD/32WD/32XD | (South Korea) An Se-young | (China) Wang Zhiyi |
| 6 April | Badminton Asia Championships (Draw): Dates: 7–12 April; Host: Ningbo, China; Venue: Ningbo Olympic Sports Center Gymnasium; Level: Continental Individual Championships; Format: 32MS/32WS/32MD/32WD/32XD | Score: 21–12, 17–21, 21–18 | |
| 6 April | Badminton Asia Championships (Draw): Dates: 7–12 April; Host: Ningbo, China; Venue: Ningbo Olympic Sports Center Gymnasium; Level: Continental Individual Championships; Format: 32MS/32WS/32MD/32WD/32XD | (South Korea) Kim Won-ho (South Korea) Seo Seung-jae | (South Korea) Kang Min-hyuk (South Korea) Ki Dong-ju |
| 6 April | Badminton Asia Championships (Draw): Dates: 7–12 April; Host: Ningbo, China; Venue: Ningbo Olympic Sports Center Gymnasium; Level: Continental Individual Championships; Format: 32MS/32WS/32MD/32WD/32XD | Score: 21–13, 21–17 | |
| 6 April | Badminton Asia Championships (Draw): Dates: 7–12 April; Host: Ningbo, China; Venue: Ningbo Olympic Sports Center Gymnasium; Level: Continental Individual Championships; Format: 32MS/32WS/32MD/32WD/32XD | (China) Li Yijing (China) Luo Xumin | (China) Liu Shengshu (China) Tan Ning |
| 6 April | Badminton Asia Championships (Draw): Dates: 7–12 April; Host: Ningbo, China; Venue: Ningbo Olympic Sports Center Gymnasium; Level: Continental Individual Championships; Format: 32MS/32WS/32MD/32WD/32XD | Score: 8–5 (Retired) | |
| 6 April | Badminton Asia Championships (Draw): Dates: 7–12 April; Host: Ningbo, China; Venue: Ningbo Olympic Sports Center Gymnasium; Level: Continental Individual Championships; Format: 32MS/32WS/32MD/32WD/32XD | (South Korea) Kim Jae-hyeon (South Korea) Jang Ha-jeong | (Thailand) Dechapol Puavaranukroh (Thailand) Supissara Paewsampran |
| 6 April | Badminton Asia Championships (Draw): Dates: 7–12 April; Host: Ningbo, China; Venue: Ningbo Olympic Sports Center Gymnasium; Level: Continental Individual Championships; Format: 32MS/32WS/32MD/32WD/32XD | Score: Walkover | |
| 6 April | Pan American Championships (Draw): Dates: 7–10 April; Host: Lima, Peru; Venue: High Performance Center VIDENA; Level: Continental Individual Championships; Format: 64MS/64WS/32MD/32WD/64XD | (Canada) Victor Lai | (El Salvador) Uriel Canjura |
| 6 April | Pan American Championships (Draw): Dates: 7–10 April; Host: Lima, Peru; Venue: High Performance Center VIDENA; Level: Continental Individual Championships; Format: 64MS/64WS/32MD/32WD/64XD | Score: 21–11, 21–9 | |
| 6 April | Pan American Championships (Draw): Dates: 7–10 April; Host: Lima, Peru; Venue: High Performance Center VIDENA; Level: Continental Individual Championships; Format: 64MS/64WS/32MD/32WD/64XD | (Canada) Michelle Li | (Canada) Wen Yu Zhang |
| 6 April | Pan American Championships (Draw): Dates: 7–10 April; Host: Lima, Peru; Venue: High Performance Center VIDENA; Level: Continental Individual Championships; Format: 64MS/64WS/32MD/32WD/64XD | Score: 21–16, 22–20 | |
| 6 April | Pan American Championships (Draw): Dates: 7–10 April; Host: Lima, Peru; Venue: High Performance Center VIDENA; Level: Continental Individual Championships; Format: 64MS/64WS/32MD/32WD/64XD | (United States) Chen Zhi-yi (United States) Presley Smith | (Canada) Kevin Lee (Canada) Ty Alexander Lindeman |
| 6 April | Pan American Championships (Draw): Dates: 7–10 April; Host: Lima, Peru; Venue: High Performance Center VIDENA; Level: Continental Individual Championships; Format: 64MS/64WS/32MD/32WD/64XD | Score: 21–13, 21–8 | |
| 6 April | Pan American Championships (Draw): Dates: 7–10 April; Host: Lima, Peru; Venue: High Performance Center VIDENA; Level: Continental Individual Championships; Format: 64MS/64WS/32MD/32WD/64XD | (United States) Lauren Lam (United States) Allison Lee | (United States) Francesca Corbett (United States) Jennie Gai |
| 6 April | Pan American Championships (Draw): Dates: 7–10 April; Host: Lima, Peru; Venue: High Performance Center VIDENA; Level: Continental Individual Championships; Format: 64MS/64WS/32MD/32WD/64XD | Score: 21–18, 21–18 | |
| 6 April | Pan American Championships (Draw): Dates: 7–10 April; Host: Lima, Peru; Venue: High Performance Center VIDENA; Level: Continental Individual Championships; Format: 64MS/64WS/32MD/32WD/64XD | (United States) Presley Smith (United States) Jennie Gai | (Brazil) Davi Silva (Brazil) Sânia Lima |
| 6 April | Pan American Championships (Draw): Dates: 7–10 April; Host: Lima, Peru; Venue: High Performance Center VIDENA; Level: Continental Individual Championships; Format: 64MS/64WS/32MD/32WD/64XD | Score: 21–16, 21–15 | |
| 13 April | Malta International: Dates: 16–19 April; Host: Cospicua, Malta; Venue: Cottonera Sports Complex; Level: Future Series; Format: 32MS/32WS/32MD/32WD/32XD | (Poland) Dominik Kwinta | (Poland) Mikołaj Szymanowski |
| 13 April | Malta International: Dates: 16–19 April; Host: Cospicua, Malta; Venue: Cottonera Sports Complex; Level: Future Series; Format: 32MS/32WS/32MD/32WD/32XD | Score: 21–19, 18–21, 21–11 | |
| 13 April | Malta International: Dates: 16–19 April; Host: Cospicua, Malta; Venue: Cottonera Sports Complex; Level: Future Series; Format: 32MS/32WS/32MD/32WD/32XD | (United Arab Emirates) Prakriti Bharath | (Hungary) Ágnes Kőrösi |
| 13 April | Malta International: Dates: 16–19 April; Host: Cospicua, Malta; Venue: Cottonera Sports Complex; Level: Future Series; Format: 32MS/32WS/32MD/32WD/32XD | Score: 21–16, 21–13 | |
| 13 April | Malta International: Dates: 16–19 April; Host: Cospicua, Malta; Venue: Cottonera Sports Complex; Level: Future Series; Format: 32MS/32WS/32MD/32WD/32XD | (England) Robin Harper (England) Harry Wakefield | (Denmark) Oliver Geisler (Denmark) Niklas Lynge Olesen |
| 13 April | Malta International: Dates: 16–19 April; Host: Cospicua, Malta; Venue: Cottonera Sports Complex; Level: Future Series; Format: 32MS/32WS/32MD/32WD/32XD | Score: 21–11, 21–15 | |
| 13 April | Malta International: Dates: 16–19 April; Host: Cospicua, Malta; Venue: Cottonera Sports Complex; Level: Future Series; Format: 32MS/32WS/32MD/32WD/32XD | (Republic of Ireland) Orla Flynn (Republic of Ireland) Siofra Flynn | (Netherlands) Sterre Bang (Netherlands) Inger Pothuizen |
| 13 April | Malta International: Dates: 16–19 April; Host: Cospicua, Malta; Venue: Cottonera Sports Complex; Level: Future Series; Format: 32MS/32WS/32MD/32WD/32XD | Score: 21–15, 21–14 | |
| 13 April | Malta International: Dates: 16–19 April; Host: Cospicua, Malta; Venue: Cottonera Sports Complex; Level: Future Series; Format: 32MS/32WS/32MD/32WD/32XD | (United Arab Emirates) Dhiren Ayyappan (United Arab Emirates) Taabia Khan | (England) Robin Harper (England) Yulia Tang |
| 13 April | Malta International: Dates: 16–19 April; Host: Cospicua, Malta; Venue: Cottonera Sports Complex; Level: Future Series; Format: 32MS/32WS/32MD/32WD/32XD | Score: 18–21, 22–20, 21–13 | |
| 20 April | Finnish International: Dates: 23–26 April; Host: Vantaa, Finland; Venue: Energia Areena; Level: Future Series; Prize: $4,500; Format: 32MS/32WS/32MD/32WD/32XD | (Japan) Hyuga Takano | (Sweden) Muh Azahbru Kasra |
| 20 April | Finnish International: Dates: 23–26 April; Host: Vantaa, Finland; Venue: Energia Areena; Level: Future Series; Prize: $4,500; Format: 32MS/32WS/32MD/32WD/32XD | Score: 21–11, 21–13 | |
| 20 April | Finnish International: Dates: 23–26 April; Host: Vantaa, Finland; Venue: Energia Areena; Level: Future Series; Prize: $4,500; Format: 32MS/32WS/32MD/32WD/32XD | (Japan) Yuzuno Watanabe | (United States) Micah Henares Cruz |
| 20 April | Finnish International: Dates: 23–26 April; Host: Vantaa, Finland; Venue: Energia Areena; Level: Future Series; Prize: $4,500; Format: 32MS/32WS/32MD/32WD/32XD | Score: 21–14, 22–20 | |
| 20 April | Finnish International: Dates: 23–26 April; Host: Vantaa, Finland; Venue: Energia Areena; Level: Future Series; Prize: $4,500; Format: 32MS/32WS/32MD/32WD/32XD | (Sweden) Jakob Ekman (Sweden) Oscar Reuterhäll | (Estonia) Kristjan Kaljurand (Estonia) Raul Käsner |
| 20 April | Finnish International: Dates: 23–26 April; Host: Vantaa, Finland; Venue: Energia Areena; Level: Future Series; Prize: $4,500; Format: 32MS/32WS/32MD/32WD/32XD | Score: 21–7, 17–21, 21–13 | |
| 20 April | Finnish International: Dates: 23–26 April; Host: Vantaa, Finland; Venue: Energia Areena; Level: Future Series; Prize: $4,500; Format: 32MS/32WS/32MD/32WD/32XD | (Estonia) Catlyn Kruus (Estonia) Ramona Üprus | (Switzerland) Victoria Dübendorfer (Switzerland) Nishka Sharma |
| 20 April | Finnish International: Dates: 23–26 April; Host: Vantaa, Finland; Venue: Energia Areena; Level: Future Series; Prize: $4,500; Format: 32MS/32WS/32MD/32WD/32XD | Score: 21–12, 21–17 | |
| 20 April | Finnish International: Dates: 23–26 April; Host: Vantaa, Finland; Venue: Energia Areena; Level: Future Series; Prize: $4,500; Format: 32MS/32WS/32MD/32WD/32XD | (Finland) Anton Kaisti (Finland) Iina Suutarinen | (Sweden) Johan Azelius (Sweden) Romina Olyaee |
| 20 April | Finnish International: Dates: 23–26 April; Host: Vantaa, Finland; Venue: Energia Areena; Level: Future Series; Prize: $4,500; Format: 32MS/32WS/32MD/32WD/32XD | Score: 21–18, 22–20 | |
| 20 April | Thomas Cup (Draw): Dates: 24 April – 3 May; Host: Horsens, Denmark; Venue: Forum Horsens; Level: Continental Team Championships; Format: 16MT | Men's team | |
| 20 April | Thomas Cup (Draw): Dates: 24 April – 3 May; Host: Horsens, Denmark; Venue: Forum Horsens; Level: Continental Team Championships; Format: 16MT | China | France |
| 20 April | Thomas Cup (Draw): Dates: 24 April – 3 May; Host: Horsens, Denmark; Venue: Forum Horsens; Level: Continental Team Championships; Format: 16MT | Shi Yuqi | Christo Popov |
| 20 April | Thomas Cup (Draw): Dates: 24 April – 3 May; Host: Horsens, Denmark; Venue: Forum Horsens; Level: Continental Team Championships; Format: 16MT | Li Shifeng | Alex Lanier |
| 20 April | Thomas Cup (Draw): Dates: 24 April – 3 May; Host: Horsens, Denmark; Venue: Forum Horsens; Level: Continental Team Championships; Format: 16MT | Weng Hongyang | Toma Junior Popov |
| 20 April | Thomas Cup (Draw): Dates: 24 April – 3 May; Host: Horsens, Denmark; Venue: Forum Horsens; Level: Continental Team Championships; Format: 16MT | He Jiting; Ren Xiangyu | Éloi Adam; Léo Rossi |
| 20 April | Thomas Cup (Draw): Dates: 24 April – 3 May; Host: Horsens, Denmark; Venue: Forum Horsens; Level: Continental Team Championships; Format: 16MT | Liang Weikeng; Wang Chang | Christo Popov; Toma Junior Popov |
| 20 April | Thomas Cup (Draw): Dates: 24 April – 3 May; Host: Horsens, Denmark; Venue: Forum Horsens; Level: Continental Team Championships; Format: 16MT | Score: 3–1 | |
| 20 April | Uber Cup (Draw): Dates: 24 April – 3 May; Host: Horsens, Denmark; Venue: Forum Horsens; Level: Continental Team Championships; Format: 16WT | Women's team | |
| 20 April | Uber Cup (Draw): Dates: 24 April – 3 May; Host: Horsens, Denmark; Venue: Forum Horsens; Level: Continental Team Championships; Format: 16WT | South Korea | China |
| 20 April | Uber Cup (Draw): Dates: 24 April – 3 May; Host: Horsens, Denmark; Venue: Forum Horsens; Level: Continental Team Championships; Format: 16WT | An Se-young | Wang Zhiyi |
| 20 April | Uber Cup (Draw): Dates: 24 April – 3 May; Host: Horsens, Denmark; Venue: Forum Horsens; Level: Continental Team Championships; Format: 16WT | Jeong Na-eun; Lee So-hee | Liu Shengshu; Tan Ning |
| 20 April | Uber Cup (Draw): Dates: 24 April – 3 May; Host: Horsens, Denmark; Venue: Forum Horsens; Level: Continental Team Championships; Format: 16WT | Kim Ga-eun | Chen Yufei |
| 20 April | Uber Cup (Draw): Dates: 24 April – 3 May; Host: Horsens, Denmark; Venue: Forum Horsens; Level: Continental Team Championships; Format: 16WT | Baek Ha-na; Kim Hye-jeong | Jia Yifan; Zhang Shuxian |
| 20 April | Uber Cup (Draw): Dates: 24 April – 3 May; Host: Horsens, Denmark; Venue: Forum Horsens; Level: Continental Team Championships; Format: 16WT | Sim Yu-jin | Han Yue |
| 20 April | Uber Cup (Draw): Dates: 24 April – 3 May; Host: Horsens, Denmark; Venue: Forum Horsens; Level: Continental Team Championships; Format: 16WT | Score: 3–1 | |
| 27 April | Perú Future Series: Dates: 29 April – 3 May; Host: Lima, Peru; Venue: Club de Regatas Lima; Level: Future Series; Format: 32MS/32WS/32MD/16WD/32XD | (Canada) Xiaodong Sheng | (Canada) Asher Bedi |
| 27 April | Perú Future Series: Dates: 29 April – 3 May; Host: Lima, Peru; Venue: Club de Regatas Lima; Level: Future Series; Format: 32MS/32WS/32MD/16WD/32XD | Score: 21–15, 21–17 | |
| 27 April | Perú Future Series: Dates: 29 April – 3 May; Host: Lima, Peru; Venue: Club de Regatas Lima; Level: Future Series; Format: 32MS/32WS/32MD/16WD/32XD | (Peru) Inés Castillo | (Peru) Naomi Junco |
| 27 April | Perú Future Series: Dates: 29 April – 3 May; Host: Lima, Peru; Venue: Club de Regatas Lima; Level: Future Series; Format: 32MS/32WS/32MD/16WD/32XD | Score: 21–13, 21–12 | |
| 27 April | Perú Future Series: Dates: 29 April – 3 May; Host: Lima, Peru; Venue: Club de Regatas Lima; Level: Future Series; Format: 32MS/32WS/32MD/16WD/32XD | (Canada) Jason Mak (Canada) Wong Yan Kit | (India) Achutaditya Rao Doddavarapu (India) Arjun Reddy Pochana |
| 27 April | Perú Future Series: Dates: 29 April – 3 May; Host: Lima, Peru; Venue: Club de Regatas Lima; Level: Future Series; Format: 32MS/32WS/32MD/16WD/32XD | Score: 22–20, 21–9 | |
| 27 April | Perú Future Series: Dates: 29 April – 3 May; Host: Lima, Peru; Venue: Club de Regatas Lima; Level: Future Series; Format: 32MS/32WS/32MD/16WD/32XD | (Brazil) Tamires Santos (Brazil) Ana Júlia Ywata | (Peru) Valeria Curo (Peru) Mei Kiyota |
| 27 April | Perú Future Series: Dates: 29 April – 3 May; Host: Lima, Peru; Venue: Club de Regatas Lima; Level: Future Series; Format: 32MS/32WS/32MD/16WD/32XD | Score: 15–21, 21–16, 21–14 | |
| 27 April | Perú Future Series: Dates: 29 April – 3 May; Host: Lima, Peru; Venue: Club de Regatas Lima; Level: Future Series; Format: 32MS/32WS/32MD/16WD/32XD | (Peru) Sharum Durand (Peru) Rafaela Munar | (Brazil) Joaquim Mendonça (Brazil) Tamires Santos |
| 27 April | Perú Future Series: Dates: 29 April – 3 May; Host: Lima, Peru; Venue: Club de Regatas Lima; Level: Future Series; Format: 32MS/32WS/32MD/16WD/32XD | Score: 21–18, 21–19 | |
| 27 April | Luxembourg Open: Dates: 30 April – 3 May; Host: Luxembourg, Luxembourg; Venue: d'Coque; Level: International Series; Prize: $10,000; Format: 32MS/32WS/32MD/32WD/32XD | (Japan) Akira Hanada | (Denmark) Christopher Vittoriani |
| 27 April | Luxembourg Open: Dates: 30 April – 3 May; Host: Luxembourg, Luxembourg; Venue: d'Coque; Level: International Series; Prize: $10,000; Format: 32MS/32WS/32MD/32WD/32XD | Score: 20–22, 21–14, 21–7 | |
| 27 April | Luxembourg Open: Dates: 30 April – 3 May; Host: Luxembourg, Luxembourg; Venue: d'Coque; Level: International Series; Prize: $10,000; Format: 32MS/32WS/32MD/32WD/32XD | (Czech Republic) Petra Maixnerová | (India) Meghana Reddy |
| 27 April | Luxembourg Open: Dates: 30 April – 3 May; Host: Luxembourg, Luxembourg; Venue: d'Coque; Level: International Series; Prize: $10,000; Format: 32MS/32WS/32MD/32WD/32XD | Score: 19–21, 21–13, 21–16 | |
| 27 April | Luxembourg Open: Dates: 30 April – 3 May; Host: Luxembourg, Luxembourg; Venue: d'Coque; Level: International Series; Prize: $10,000; Format: 32MS/32WS/32MD/32WD/32XD | (Japan) Shuntaro Mezaki (Japan) Yuta Oku | (Japan) Takuto Goto (Japan) Tsubasa Yoshida |
| 27 April | Luxembourg Open: Dates: 30 April – 3 May; Host: Luxembourg, Luxembourg; Venue: d'Coque; Level: International Series; Prize: $10,000; Format: 32MS/32WS/32MD/32WD/32XD | Score: 21–18, 21–12 | |
| 27 April | Luxembourg Open: Dates: 30 April – 3 May; Host: Luxembourg, Luxembourg; Venue: d'Coque; Level: International Series; Prize: $10,000; Format: 32MS/32WS/32MD/32WD/32XD | (Individual Neutral Athletes) Anastasiia Boiarun (Individual Neutral Athletes) Daria Kharlampovich | (Denmark) Sophia Lemming (Denmark) Amanda Aarrebo Petersen |
| 27 April | Luxembourg Open: Dates: 30 April – 3 May; Host: Luxembourg, Luxembourg; Venue: d'Coque; Level: International Series; Prize: $10,000; Format: 32MS/32WS/32MD/32WD/32XD | Score: 21–15, 21–13 | |
| 27 April | Luxembourg Open: Dates: 30 April – 3 May; Host: Luxembourg, Luxembourg; Venue: d'Coque; Level: International Series; Prize: $10,000; Format: 32MS/32WS/32MD/32WD/32XD | (Denmark) Jeppe Søby (Denmark) Sofie Røjkjær | (Germany) Simon Krax (Germany) Amelie Lehmann |
| 27 April | Luxembourg Open: Dates: 30 April – 3 May; Host: Luxembourg, Luxembourg; Venue: d'Coque; Level: International Series; Prize: $10,000; Format: 32MS/32WS/32MD/32WD/32XD | Score: 21–19, 22–20 | |

=== May ===
| Week commencing | Tournament | Champions | Runners-up |
|---|---|---|---|
| 4 May | Slovak Open: Dates: 6–9 May; Host: Bratislava, Slovakia; Venue: Multisport hall; Level: Future Series; Format: 32MS/32WS/32MD/32WD/32XD | (Sweden) Muh Azahbru Kasra | (Austria) Wolfgang Gnedt |
| 4 May | Slovak Open: Dates: 6–9 May; Host: Bratislava, Slovakia; Venue: Multisport hall; Level: Future Series; Format: 32MS/32WS/32MD/32WD/32XD | Score: 21–11, 18–21, 21–14 | |
| 4 May | Slovak Open: Dates: 6–9 May; Host: Bratislava, Slovakia; Venue: Multisport hall; Level: Future Series; Format: 32MS/32WS/32MD/32WD/32XD | (Malaysia) Carine Tee | (Bulgaria) Gergana Pavlova |
| 4 May | Slovak Open: Dates: 6–9 May; Host: Bratislava, Slovakia; Venue: Multisport hall; Level: Future Series; Format: 32MS/32WS/32MD/32WD/32XD | Score: 23–21, 21–9 | |
| 4 May | Slovak Open: Dates: 6–9 May; Host: Bratislava, Slovakia; Venue: Multisport hall; Level: Future Series; Format: 32MS/32WS/32MD/32WD/32XD | (Malaysia) Damien Ling (Malaysia) Irfan Shazmir | (Malaysia) Isyraf Hafizin (Malaysia) Ahmad Redzuan |
| 4 May | Slovak Open: Dates: 6–9 May; Host: Bratislava, Slovakia; Venue: Multisport hall; Level: Future Series; Format: 32MS/32WS/32MD/32WD/32XD | Score: 21–5, 21–19 | |
| 4 May | Slovak Open: Dates: 6–9 May; Host: Bratislava, Slovakia; Venue: Multisport hall; Level: Future Series; Format: 32MS/32WS/32MD/32WD/32XD | (Chinese Taipei) Chen Hsin-tung (Chinese Taipei) Chen Yu-hsi | (Malaysia) Tan Xin Yu (Malaysia) Teh Si Yan |
| 4 May | Slovak Open: Dates: 6–9 May; Host: Bratislava, Slovakia; Venue: Multisport hall; Level: Future Series; Format: 32MS/32WS/32MD/32WD/32XD | Score: 21–15, 19–21, 27–25 | |
| 4 May | Slovak Open: Dates: 6–9 May; Host: Bratislava, Slovakia; Venue: Multisport hall; Level: Future Series; Format: 32MS/32WS/32MD/32WD/32XD | (Chinese Taipei) Huang Tzu-yuan (Chinese Taipei) Kung Chia-yi | (Malaysia) Ahmad Redzuan (Malaysia) Teh Si Yan |
| 4 May | Slovak Open: Dates: 6–9 May; Host: Bratislava, Slovakia; Venue: Multisport hall; Level: Future Series; Format: 32MS/32WS/32MD/32WD/32XD | Score: 23–21, 12–21, 21–18 | |
| 4 May | Mexican International: Dates: 6–10 May; Host: Aguascalientes, Mexico; Venue: Poliforum Deportivo y Cultural Universitario Morelos; Level: International Challenge; Prize: $20,000; Format: 32MS/32WS/32MD/16WD/32XD | (Brazil) Jonathan Matias | (Italy) Fabio Caponio |
| 4 May | Mexican International: Dates: 6–10 May; Host: Aguascalientes, Mexico; Venue: Poliforum Deportivo y Cultural Universitario Morelos; Level: International Challenge; Prize: $20,000; Format: 32MS/32WS/32MD/16WD/32XD | Score: 21–11, 21–14 | |
| 4 May | Mexican International: Dates: 6–10 May; Host: Aguascalientes, Mexico; Venue: Poliforum Deportivo y Cultural Universitario Morelos; Level: International Challenge; Prize: $20,000; Format: 32MS/32WS/32MD/16WD/32XD | (India) Shriyanshi Valishetty | (Brazil) Juliana Viana Vieira |
| 4 May | Mexican International: Dates: 6–10 May; Host: Aguascalientes, Mexico; Venue: Poliforum Deportivo y Cultural Universitario Morelos; Level: International Challenge; Prize: $20,000; Format: 32MS/32WS/32MD/16WD/32XD | Score: 12–21, 21–16, 21–18 | |
| 4 May | Mexican International: Dates: 6–10 May; Host: Aguascalientes, Mexico; Venue: Poliforum Deportivo y Cultural Universitario Morelos; Level: International Challenge; Prize: $20,000; Format: 32MS/32WS/32MD/16WD/32XD | (India) Krishna Prasad Garaga (India) Pruthvi Roy | (Canada) Hugo Pong (Canada) Kern Pong |
| 4 May | Mexican International: Dates: 6–10 May; Host: Aguascalientes, Mexico; Venue: Poliforum Deportivo y Cultural Universitario Morelos; Level: International Challenge; Prize: $20,000; Format: 32MS/32WS/32MD/16WD/32XD | Score: 21–18, 21–19 | |
| 4 May | Mexican International: Dates: 6–10 May; Host: Aguascalientes, Mexico; Venue: Poliforum Deportivo y Cultural Universitario Morelos; Level: International Challenge; Prize: $20,000; Format: 32MS/32WS/32MD/16WD/32XD | (Japan) Rui Kiyama (Japan) Sona Yonemoto | (Mexico) Romina Fregoso (Mexico) Miriam Rodríguez |
| 4 May | Mexican International: Dates: 6–10 May; Host: Aguascalientes, Mexico; Venue: Poliforum Deportivo y Cultural Universitario Morelos; Level: International Challenge; Prize: $20,000; Format: 32MS/32WS/32MD/16WD/32XD | Score: 21–10, 21–14 | |
| 4 May | Mexican International: Dates: 6–10 May; Host: Aguascalientes, Mexico; Venue: Poliforum Deportivo y Cultural Universitario Morelos; Level: International Challenge; Prize: $20,000; Format: 32MS/32WS/32MD/16WD/32XD | (Brazil) Davi Silva (Brazil) Sânia Lima | (India) Dhruv Rawat (India) K. Maneesha |
| 4 May | Mexican International: Dates: 6–10 May; Host: Aguascalientes, Mexico; Venue: Poliforum Deportivo y Cultural Universitario Morelos; Level: International Challenge; Prize: $20,000; Format: 32MS/32WS/32MD/16WD/32XD | Score: 21–19, 23–25, 24–22 | |
| 11 May | Thailand Open (Draw): Dates: 12–17 May; Host: Bangkok, Thailand; Venue: Nimibutr Stadium; Level: Super 500; Prize: $500,000; Format: 32MS/32WS/32MD/32WD/32XD | (Denmark) Anders Antonsen | (Thailand) Kunlavut Vitidsarn |
| 11 May | Thailand Open (Draw): Dates: 12–17 May; Host: Bangkok, Thailand; Venue: Nimibutr Stadium; Level: Super 500; Prize: $500,000; Format: 32MS/32WS/32MD/32WD/32XD | Score: 9–21, 24–22, 21–18 | |
| 11 May | Thailand Open (Draw): Dates: 12–17 May; Host: Bangkok, Thailand; Venue: Nimibutr Stadium; Level: Super 500; Prize: $500,000; Format: 32MS/32WS/32MD/32WD/32XD | (Japan) Akane Yamaguchi | (China) Chen Yufei |
| 11 May | Thailand Open (Draw): Dates: 12–17 May; Host: Bangkok, Thailand; Venue: Nimibutr Stadium; Level: Super 500; Prize: $500,000; Format: 32MS/32WS/32MD/32WD/32XD | Score: 21–14, 21–18 | |
| 11 May | Thailand Open (Draw): Dates: 12–17 May; Host: Bangkok, Thailand; Venue: Nimibutr Stadium; Level: Super 500; Prize: $500,000; Format: 32MS/32WS/32MD/32WD/32XD | (Indonesia) Leo Rolly Carnando (Indonesia) Daniel Marthin | (India) Satwiksairaj Rankireddy (India) Chirag Shetty |
| 11 May | Thailand Open (Draw): Dates: 12–17 May; Host: Bangkok, Thailand; Venue: Nimibutr Stadium; Level: Super 500; Prize: $500,000; Format: 32MS/32WS/32MD/32WD/32XD | Score: 21–12, 25–23 | |
| 11 May | Thailand Open (Draw): Dates: 12–17 May; Host: Bangkok, Thailand; Venue: Nimibutr Stadium; Level: Super 500; Prize: $500,000; Format: 32MS/32WS/32MD/32WD/32XD | (China) Bao Lijing (China) Cao Zihan | (Japan) Rin Iwanaga (Japan) Kie Nakanishi |
| 11 May | Thailand Open (Draw): Dates: 12–17 May; Host: Bangkok, Thailand; Venue: Nimibutr Stadium; Level: Super 500; Prize: $500,000; Format: 32MS/32WS/32MD/32WD/32XD | Score: 19–21, 21–16, 21–19 | |
| 11 May | Thailand Open (Draw): Dates: 12–17 May; Host: Bangkok, Thailand; Venue: Nimibutr Stadium; Level: Super 500; Prize: $500,000; Format: 32MS/32WS/32MD/32WD/32XD | (Denmark) Mathias Christiansen (Denmark) Alexandra Bøje | (China) Zhu Yijun (China) Li Qian |
| 11 May | Thailand Open (Draw): Dates: 12–17 May; Host: Bangkok, Thailand; Venue: Nimibutr Stadium; Level: Super 500; Prize: $500,000; Format: 32MS/32WS/32MD/32WD/32XD | Score: 21–17, 21–15 | |
| 11 May | Baoji China Masters (Draw): Dates: 12–17 May; Host: Baoji, Shaanxi, China; Venue: Baoji City Gymnasium; Level: Super 100; Prize: $120,000; Format: 64MS/32WS/32MD/32WD/32XD | (China) Sun Chao | (Japan) Riki Takei |
| 11 May | Baoji China Masters (Draw): Dates: 12–17 May; Host: Baoji, Shaanxi, China; Venue: Baoji City Gymnasium; Level: Super 100; Prize: $120,000; Format: 64MS/32WS/32MD/32WD/32XD | Score: 21–12, 21–13 | |
| 11 May | Baoji China Masters (Draw): Dates: 12–17 May; Host: Baoji, Shaanxi, China; Venue: Baoji City Gymnasium; Level: Super 100; Prize: $120,000; Format: 64MS/32WS/32MD/32WD/32XD | (China) Yuan Anqi | (India) Shriyanshi Valishetty |
| 11 May | Baoji China Masters (Draw): Dates: 12–17 May; Host: Baoji, Shaanxi, China; Venue: Baoji City Gymnasium; Level: Super 100; Prize: $120,000; Format: 64MS/32WS/32MD/32WD/32XD | Score: 21–14, 21–6 | |
| 11 May | Baoji China Masters (Draw): Dates: 12–17 May; Host: Baoji, Shaanxi, China; Venue: Baoji City Gymnasium; Level: Super 100; Prize: $120,000; Format: 64MS/32WS/32MD/32WD/32XD | (China) Ma Shang (China) Shen Xuanyao | (Japan) Shuntaro Mezaki (Japan) Yuta Oku |
| 11 May | Baoji China Masters (Draw): Dates: 12–17 May; Host: Baoji, Shaanxi, China; Venue: Baoji City Gymnasium; Level: Super 100; Prize: $120,000; Format: 64MS/32WS/32MD/32WD/32XD | Score: 21–15, 19–21, 21–13 | |
| 11 May | Baoji China Masters (Draw): Dates: 12–17 May; Host: Baoji, Shaanxi, China; Venue: Baoji City Gymnasium; Level: Super 100; Prize: $120,000; Format: 64MS/32WS/32MD/32WD/32XD | (Japan) Sumire Nakade (Japan) Miyu Takahashi | (Malaysia) Low Zi Yu (Malaysia) Noraqilah Maisarah |
| 11 May | Baoji China Masters (Draw): Dates: 12–17 May; Host: Baoji, Shaanxi, China; Venue: Baoji City Gymnasium; Level: Super 100; Prize: $120,000; Format: 64MS/32WS/32MD/32WD/32XD | Score: 21–13, 21–17 | |
| 11 May | Baoji China Masters (Draw): Dates: 12–17 May; Host: Baoji, Shaanxi, China; Venue: Baoji City Gymnasium; Level: Super 100; Prize: $120,000; Format: 64MS/32WS/32MD/32WD/32XD | (China) Ma Xixiang (China) Qin Huizhi | (Hong Kong) Chan Yin Chak (Hong Kong) Ng Tsz Yau |
| 11 May | Baoji China Masters (Draw): Dates: 12–17 May; Host: Baoji, Shaanxi, China; Venue: Baoji City Gymnasium; Level: Super 100; Prize: $120,000; Format: 64MS/32WS/32MD/32WD/32XD | Score: 25–23, 21–19 | |
| 11 May | Slovenia Open: Dates: 13–17 May; Host: Maribor, Slovenia; Venue: Hotel Draš; Level: International Series; Prize: $10,000; Format: 64MS/64WS/32MD/32WD/32XD | (India) Sathish Karunakaran | (Malaysia) Tan Kean Wei |
| 11 May | Slovenia Open: Dates: 13–17 May; Host: Maribor, Slovenia; Venue: Hotel Draš; Level: International Series; Prize: $10,000; Format: 64MS/64WS/32MD/32WD/32XD | Score: 21–17, 21–14 | |
| 11 May | Slovenia Open: Dates: 13–17 May; Host: Maribor, Slovenia; Venue: Hotel Draš; Level: International Series; Prize: $10,000; Format: 64MS/64WS/32MD/32WD/32XD | (India) Ilishaa Pal | (Chinese Taipei) Liao Jui-chi |
| 11 May | Slovenia Open: Dates: 13–17 May; Host: Maribor, Slovenia; Venue: Hotel Draš; Level: International Series; Prize: $10,000; Format: 64MS/64WS/32MD/32WD/32XD | Score: 21–19, 21–15 | |
| 11 May | Slovenia Open: Dates: 13–17 May; Host: Maribor, Slovenia; Venue: Hotel Draš; Level: International Series; Prize: $10,000; Format: 64MS/64WS/32MD/32WD/32XD | (Denmark) Robert Nebel (Denmark) Jeppe Søby | (Malaysia) Isyraf Hafizin (Malaysia) Ahmad Redzuan |
| 11 May | Slovenia Open: Dates: 13–17 May; Host: Maribor, Slovenia; Venue: Hotel Draš; Level: International Series; Prize: $10,000; Format: 64MS/64WS/32MD/32WD/32XD | Score: 22–20, 21–19 | |
| 11 May | Slovenia Open: Dates: 13–17 May; Host: Maribor, Slovenia; Venue: Hotel Draš; Level: International Series; Prize: $10,000; Format: 64MS/64WS/32MD/32WD/32XD | (Netherlands) Debora Jille (Netherlands) Meerte Loos | (India) Aditi Bhatt (India) Shravani Walekar |
| 11 May | Slovenia Open: Dates: 13–17 May; Host: Maribor, Slovenia; Venue: Hotel Draš; Level: International Series; Prize: $10,000; Format: 64MS/64WS/32MD/32WD/32XD | Score: 21–19, 21–14 | |
| 11 May | Slovenia Open: Dates: 13–17 May; Host: Maribor, Slovenia; Venue: Hotel Draš; Level: International Series; Prize: $10,000; Format: 64MS/64WS/32MD/32WD/32XD | (India) Sathish Karunakaran (India) Zenith Abbigail | (Malaysia) Ahmad Redzuan (Malaysia) Teh Si Yan |
| 11 May | Slovenia Open: Dates: 13–17 May; Host: Maribor, Slovenia; Venue: Hotel Draš; Level: International Series; Prize: $10,000; Format: 64MS/64WS/32MD/32WD/32XD | Score: 21–19, 21–15 | |
| 11 May | Réunion Open: Dates: 14–17 May; Host: Saint-Denis, La Réunion; Venue: Gymnasium Champ Fleuri; Level: International Challenge; Prize: $24,500; Format: 32MS/32WS/16MD/16WD/32XD | (India) Rounak Chouhan | (India) Saneeth Dayanand |
| 11 May | Réunion Open: Dates: 14–17 May; Host: Saint-Denis, La Réunion; Venue: Gymnasium Champ Fleuri; Level: International Challenge; Prize: $24,500; Format: 32MS/32WS/16MD/16WD/32XD | Score: 21–16, 21–16 | |
| 11 May | Réunion Open: Dates: 14–17 May; Host: Saint-Denis, La Réunion; Venue: Gymnasium Champ Fleuri; Level: International Challenge; Prize: $24,500; Format: 32MS/32WS/16MD/16WD/32XD | (India) Tasnim Mir | (India) Aakarshi Kashyap |
| 11 May | Réunion Open: Dates: 14–17 May; Host: Saint-Denis, La Réunion; Venue: Gymnasium Champ Fleuri; Level: International Challenge; Prize: $24,500; Format: 32MS/32WS/16MD/16WD/32XD | Score: 21–11, 22–20 | |
| 11 May | Réunion Open: Dates: 14–17 May; Host: Saint-Denis, La Réunion; Venue: Gymnasium Champ Fleuri; Level: International Challenge; Prize: $24,500; Format: 32MS/32WS/16MD/16WD/32XD | (India) Krishna Prasad Garaga (India) Pruthvi Roy | (India) Suraj Goala (India) Dhruv Rawat |
| 11 May | Réunion Open: Dates: 14–17 May; Host: Saint-Denis, La Réunion; Venue: Gymnasium Champ Fleuri; Level: International Challenge; Prize: $24,500; Format: 32MS/32WS/16MD/16WD/32XD | Score: 22–20, 22–24, 21–18 | |
| 11 May | Réunion Open: Dates: 14–17 May; Host: Saint-Denis, La Réunion; Venue: Gymnasium Champ Fleuri; Level: International Challenge; Prize: $24,500; Format: 32MS/32WS/16MD/16WD/32XD | (Canada) Jackie Dent (Canada) Crystal Lai | (Chinese Taipei) Hsieh Chih-ying (Chinese Taipei) Lee Yu-hsuan |
| 11 May | Réunion Open: Dates: 14–17 May; Host: Saint-Denis, La Réunion; Venue: Gymnasium Champ Fleuri; Level: International Challenge; Prize: $24,500; Format: 32MS/32WS/16MD/16WD/32XD | Score: 21–14, 21–16 | |
| 11 May | Réunion Open: Dates: 14–17 May; Host: Saint-Denis, La Réunion; Venue: Gymnasium Champ Fleuri; Level: International Challenge; Prize: $24,500; Format: 32MS/32WS/16MD/16WD/32XD | (India) Ishaan Bhatnagar (India) Shruti Mishra | (France) Grégoire Deschamp (Denmark) Iben Bergstein |
| 11 May | Réunion Open: Dates: 14–17 May; Host: Saint-Denis, La Réunion; Venue: Gymnasium Champ Fleuri; Level: International Challenge; Prize: $24,500; Format: 32MS/32WS/16MD/16WD/32XD | Score: 21–17, 21–19 | |
| 18 May | Malaysia Masters (Draw): Dates: 19–24 May; Host: Kuala Lumpur, Malaysia; Venue: Unifi Arena; Level: Super 500; Prize: $500,000; Format: 32MS/32WS/32MD/32WD/32XD | (China) Li Shifeng | (Thailand) Panitchaphon Teeraratsakul |
| 18 May | Malaysia Masters (Draw): Dates: 19–24 May; Host: Kuala Lumpur, Malaysia; Venue: Unifi Arena; Level: Super 500; Prize: $500,000; Format: 32MS/32WS/32MD/32WD/32XD | Score: 21–16, 21–17 | |
| 18 May | Malaysia Masters (Draw): Dates: 19–24 May; Host: Kuala Lumpur, Malaysia; Venue: Unifi Arena; Level: Super 500; Prize: $500,000; Format: 32MS/32WS/32MD/32WD/32XD | (Thailand) Ratchanok Intanon | (China) Chen Yufei |
| 18 May | Malaysia Masters (Draw): Dates: 19–24 May; Host: Kuala Lumpur, Malaysia; Venue: Unifi Arena; Level: Super 500; Prize: $500,000; Format: 32MS/32WS/32MD/32WD/32XD | Score: 21–17, 21–15 | |
| 18 May | Malaysia Masters (Draw): Dates: 19–24 May; Host: Kuala Lumpur, Malaysia; Venue: Unifi Arena; Level: Super 500; Prize: $500,000; Format: 32MS/32WS/32MD/32WD/32XD | (Denmark) Daniel Lundgaard (Denmark) Mads Vestergaard | (Malaysia) Goh Sze Fei (Malaysia) Nur Izzuddin |
| 18 May | Malaysia Masters (Draw): Dates: 19–24 May; Host: Kuala Lumpur, Malaysia; Venue: Unifi Arena; Level: Super 500; Prize: $500,000; Format: 32MS/32WS/32MD/32WD/32XD | Score: 21–16, 21–17 | |
| 18 May | Malaysia Masters (Draw): Dates: 19–24 May; Host: Kuala Lumpur, Malaysia; Venue: Unifi Arena; Level: Super 500; Prize: $500,000; Format: 32MS/32WS/32MD/32WD/32XD | (China) Chen Fanshutian (China) Luo Xumin | (Japan) Sayaka Hirota (Japan) Ayako Sakuramoto |
| 18 May | Malaysia Masters (Draw): Dates: 19–24 May; Host: Kuala Lumpur, Malaysia; Venue: Unifi Arena; Level: Super 500; Prize: $500,000; Format: 32MS/32WS/32MD/32WD/32XD | Score: 21–16, 25–23 | |
| 18 May | Malaysia Masters (Draw): Dates: 19–24 May; Host: Kuala Lumpur, Malaysia; Venue: Unifi Arena; Level: Super 500; Prize: $500,000; Format: 32MS/32WS/32MD/32WD/32XD | (China) Gao Jiaxuan (China) Wei Yaxin | (Thailand) Pakkapon Teeraratsakul (Thailand) Sapsiree Taerattanachai |
| 18 May | Malaysia Masters (Draw): Dates: 19–24 May; Host: Kuala Lumpur, Malaysia; Venue: Unifi Arena; Level: Super 500; Prize: $500,000; Format: 32MS/32WS/32MD/32WD/32XD | Score: 21–13, 15–21, 21–11 | |
| 18 May | Austrian Open: Dates: 21–24 May; Host: Graz, Austria; Venue: Raiffeisen Sportpark; Level: International Series; Prize: $10,000; Format: 32MS/32WS/32MD/32WD/32XD | (Chinese Taipei) Yang Chieh-dan | (Canada) Joshua Nguyen |
| 18 May | Austrian Open: Dates: 21–24 May; Host: Graz, Austria; Venue: Raiffeisen Sportpark; Level: International Series; Prize: $10,000; Format: 32MS/32WS/32MD/32WD/32XD | Score: 21–15, 21–11 | |
| 18 May | Austrian Open: Dates: 21–24 May; Host: Graz, Austria; Venue: Raiffeisen Sportpark; Level: International Series; Prize: $10,000; Format: 32MS/32WS/32MD/32WD/32XD | (Canada) Rachel Chan | (India) Tanvi Patri |
| 18 May | Austrian Open: Dates: 21–24 May; Host: Graz, Austria; Venue: Raiffeisen Sportpark; Level: International Series; Prize: $10,000; Format: 32MS/32WS/32MD/32WD/32XD | Score: 21–14, 21–17 | |
| 18 May | Austrian Open: Dates: 21–24 May; Host: Graz, Austria; Venue: Raiffeisen Sportpark; Level: International Series; Prize: $10,000; Format: 32MS/32WS/32MD/32WD/32XD | (Germany) Malik Bourakkadi (Germany) Kenneth Neumann | (Chinese Taipei) Chang En-jui (Chinese Taipei) Chang Hao-hsiang |
| 18 May | Austrian Open: Dates: 21–24 May; Host: Graz, Austria; Venue: Raiffeisen Sportpark; Level: International Series; Prize: $10,000; Format: 32MS/32WS/32MD/32WD/32XD | Score: 21–14, 21–15 | |
| 18 May | Austrian Open: Dates: 21–24 May; Host: Graz, Austria; Venue: Raiffeisen Sportpark; Level: International Series; Prize: $10,000; Format: 32MS/32WS/32MD/32WD/32XD | (Chinese Taipei) Hsieh Chih-ying (Chinese Taipei) Lee Yu-hsuan | (Chinese Taipei) Chen Hsin-tung (Chinese Taipei) Chen Yu-hsi |
| 18 May | Austrian Open: Dates: 21–24 May; Host: Graz, Austria; Venue: Raiffeisen Sportpark; Level: International Series; Prize: $10,000; Format: 32MS/32WS/32MD/32WD/32XD | Score: 21–11, 21–15 | |
| 18 May | Austrian Open: Dates: 21–24 May; Host: Graz, Austria; Venue: Raiffeisen Sportpark; Level: International Series; Prize: $10,000; Format: 32MS/32WS/32MD/32WD/32XD | (Germany) Jan Colin Völker (Germany) Emma Moszczynski | (India) Sathish Karunakaran (India) Zenith Abbigail |
| 18 May | Austrian Open: Dates: 21–24 May; Host: Graz, Austria; Venue: Raiffeisen Sportpark; Level: International Series; Prize: $10,000; Format: 32MS/32WS/32MD/32WD/32XD | Score: 19–21, 21–13, 22–20 | |
| 25 May | Singapore Open (Draw): Dates: 26–31 May; Host: Singapore; Venue: Singapore Indoor Stadium; Level: Super 750; Prize: $1,000,000; Format: 32MS/32WS/32MD/32WD/32XD | (France) Alex Lanier | (Singapore) Loh Kean Yew |
| 25 May | Singapore Open (Draw): Dates: 26–31 May; Host: Singapore; Venue: Singapore Indoor Stadium; Level: Super 750; Prize: $1,000,000; Format: 32MS/32WS/32MD/32WD/32XD | Score: 17–21, 21–15, 21–14 | |
| 25 May | Singapore Open (Draw): Dates: 26–31 May; Host: Singapore; Venue: Singapore Indoor Stadium; Level: Super 750; Prize: $1,000,000; Format: 32MS/32WS/32MD/32WD/32XD | (South Korea) An Se-young | (Japan) Akane Yamaguchi |
| 25 May | Singapore Open (Draw): Dates: 26–31 May; Host: Singapore; Venue: Singapore Indoor Stadium; Level: Super 750; Prize: $1,000,000; Format: 32MS/32WS/32MD/32WD/32XD | Score: 21–11, 17–21, 21–19 | |
| 25 May | Singapore Open (Draw): Dates: 26–31 May; Host: Singapore; Venue: Singapore Indoor Stadium; Level: Super 750; Prize: $1,000,000; Format: 32MS/32WS/32MD/32WD/32XD | (India) Satwiksairaj Rankireddy (India) Chirag Shetty | (Indonesia) Fajar Alfian (Indonesia) Muhammad Shohibul Fikri |
| 25 May | Singapore Open (Draw): Dates: 26–31 May; Host: Singapore; Venue: Singapore Indoor Stadium; Level: Super 750; Prize: $1,000,000; Format: 32MS/32WS/32MD/32WD/32XD | Score: 18–21, 21–17, 21–16 | |
| 25 May | Singapore Open (Draw): Dates: 26–31 May; Host: Singapore; Venue: Singapore Indoor Stadium; Level: Super 750; Prize: $1,000,000; Format: 32MS/32WS/32MD/32WD/32XD | (China) Jia Yifan (China) Zhang Shuxian | (China) Liu Shengshu (China) Tan Ning |
| 25 May | Singapore Open (Draw): Dates: 26–31 May; Host: Singapore; Venue: Singapore Indoor Stadium; Level: Super 750; Prize: $1,000,000; Format: 32MS/32WS/32MD/32WD/32XD | Score: 22–20, 21–19 | |
| 25 May | Singapore Open (Draw): Dates: 26–31 May; Host: Singapore; Venue: Singapore Indoor Stadium; Level: Super 750; Prize: $1,000,000; Format: 32MS/32WS/32MD/32WD/32XD | (Denmark) Mathias Christiansen (Denmark) Alexandra Bøje | (Japan) Yuichi Shimogami (Japan) Sayaka Hobara |
| 25 May | Singapore Open (Draw): Dates: 26–31 May; Host: Singapore; Venue: Singapore Indoor Stadium; Level: Super 750; Prize: $1,000,000; Format: 32MS/32WS/32MD/32WD/32XD | Score: 17–21, 21–12, 21–12 | |
| 25 May | Bonn International: Dates: 27–30 May; Host: Bonn, Germany; Venue: Erwin Kranz Halle; Level: Future Series; Format: 32MS/32WS/32MD/32WD/32XD | (Hong Kong) Lam Ka To | (France) Arthur Chardain |
| 25 May | Bonn International: Dates: 27–30 May; Host: Bonn, Germany; Venue: Erwin Kranz Halle; Level: Future Series; Format: 32MS/32WS/32MD/32WD/32XD | Score: 21–17, 21–11 | |
| 25 May | Bonn International: Dates: 27–30 May; Host: Bonn, Germany; Venue: Erwin Kranz Halle; Level: Future Series; Format: 32MS/32WS/32MD/32WD/32XD | (Chinese Taipei) Liao Jui-chi | (Myanmar) Thet Htar Thuzar |
| 25 May | Bonn International: Dates: 27–30 May; Host: Bonn, Germany; Venue: Erwin Kranz Halle; Level: Future Series; Format: 32MS/32WS/32MD/32WD/32XD | Score: 21–9, 18–21, 21–10 | |
| 25 May | Bonn International: Dates: 27–30 May; Host: Bonn, Germany; Venue: Erwin Kranz Halle; Level: Future Series; Format: 32MS/32WS/32MD/32WD/32XD | (Germany) Danial Marzuan (Germany) Aaron Sonnenschein | (Hong Kong) Michaelangelo Njoto (Hong Kong) Jerry Yu |
| 25 May | Bonn International: Dates: 27–30 May; Host: Bonn, Germany; Venue: Erwin Kranz Halle; Level: Future Series; Format: 32MS/32WS/32MD/32WD/32XD | Score: 21–16, 21–17 | |
| 25 May | Bonn International: Dates: 27–30 May; Host: Bonn, Germany; Venue: Erwin Kranz Halle; Level: Future Series; Format: 32MS/32WS/32MD/32WD/32XD | (Chinese Taipei) Chen Hsin-tung (Chinese Taipei) Chen Yu-hsi | (France) Eva Bouville (France) Lily Gautier |
| 25 May | Bonn International: Dates: 27–30 May; Host: Bonn, Germany; Venue: Erwin Kranz Halle; Level: Future Series; Format: 32MS/32WS/32MD/32WD/32XD | Score: 21–12, 21–9 | |
| 25 May | Bonn International: Dates: 27–30 May; Host: Bonn, Germany; Venue: Erwin Kranz Halle; Level: Future Series; Format: 32MS/32WS/32MD/32WD/32XD | (Switzerland) Nicolas Franconville (Switzerland) Julie Franconville | (Singapore) Nge Joo Jin (Singapore) Li Zhenghong |
| 25 May | Bonn International: Dates: 27–30 May; Host: Bonn, Germany; Venue: Erwin Kranz Halle; Level: Future Series; Format: 32MS/32WS/32MD/32WD/32XD | Score: 21–15, 21–18 | |
| 25 May | Denmark Challenge: Dates: 27–31 May; Host: Brøndby, Denmark; Venue: Brøndbyhallen; Level: International Challenge; Prize: $20,000; Format: 32MS/32WS/32MD/32WD/32XD | (Israel) Daniil Dubovenko | (Denmark) William Bøgebjerg |
| 25 May | Denmark Challenge: Dates: 27–31 May; Host: Brøndby, Denmark; Venue: Brøndbyhallen; Level: International Challenge; Prize: $20,000; Format: 32MS/32WS/32MD/32WD/32XD | Score: 21–14, 21–19 | |
| 25 May | Denmark Challenge: Dates: 27–31 May; Host: Brøndby, Denmark; Venue: Brøndbyhallen; Level: International Challenge; Prize: $20,000; Format: 32MS/32WS/32MD/32WD/32XD | (Germany) Yvonne Li | (Denmark) Amalie Schulz |
| 25 May | Denmark Challenge: Dates: 27–31 May; Host: Brøndby, Denmark; Venue: Brøndbyhallen; Level: International Challenge; Prize: $20,000; Format: 32MS/32WS/32MD/32WD/32XD | Score: 14–21, 21–13, 21–18 | |
| 25 May | Denmark Challenge: Dates: 27–31 May; Host: Brøndby, Denmark; Venue: Brøndbyhallen; Level: International Challenge; Prize: $20,000; Format: 32MS/32WS/32MD/32WD/32XD | (Denmark) Christian Faust Kjær (Denmark) Rasmus Kjær | (Japan) Takuto Goto (Japan) Tsubasa Yoshida |
| 25 May | Denmark Challenge: Dates: 27–31 May; Host: Brøndby, Denmark; Venue: Brøndbyhallen; Level: International Challenge; Prize: $20,000; Format: 32MS/32WS/32MD/32WD/32XD | Score: 21–12, 21–14 | |
| 25 May | Denmark Challenge: Dates: 27–31 May; Host: Brøndby, Denmark; Venue: Brøndbyhallen; Level: International Challenge; Prize: $20,000; Format: 32MS/32WS/32MD/32WD/32XD | (Japan) Miku Sugiyama (Japan) Nana Takahashi | (Japan) Moe Aoki (Japan) Hina Osawa |
| 25 May | Denmark Challenge: Dates: 27–31 May; Host: Brøndby, Denmark; Venue: Brøndbyhallen; Level: International Challenge; Prize: $20,000; Format: 32MS/32WS/32MD/32WD/32XD | Score: 21–15, 15–21, 21–17 | |
| 25 May | Denmark Challenge: Dates: 27–31 May; Host: Brøndby, Denmark; Venue: Brøndbyhallen; Level: International Challenge; Prize: $20,000; Format: 32MS/32WS/32MD/32WD/32XD | (England) Callum Hemming (England) Estelle van Leeuwen | (Denmark) Jeppe Søby (Denmark) Sofie Røjkjær |
| 25 May | Denmark Challenge: Dates: 27–31 May; Host: Brøndby, Denmark; Venue: Brøndbyhallen; Level: International Challenge; Prize: $20,000; Format: 32MS/32WS/32MD/32WD/32XD | Score: 21–15, 21–9 | |

=== June ===
| Week commencing | Tournament | Champions | Runners-up |
|---|---|---|---|
| 1 June | Indonesia Open (Draw): Dates: 2–7 June; Host: Jakarta, Indonesia; Venue: Istora Gelora Bung Karno; Level: Super 1000; Prize: $1,450,000; Format: 32MS/32WS/32MD/32WD/32XD | (Canada) Victor Lai | (Indonesia) Jonatan Christie |
| 1 June | Indonesia Open (Draw): Dates: 2–7 June; Host: Jakarta, Indonesia; Venue: Istora Gelora Bung Karno; Level: Super 1000; Prize: $1,450,000; Format: 32MS/32WS/32MD/32WD/32XD | Score: 21–19, 21–8 | |
| 1 June | Indonesia Open (Draw): Dates: 2–7 June; Host: Jakarta, Indonesia; Venue: Istora Gelora Bung Karno; Level: Super 1000; Prize: $1,450,000; Format: 32MS/32WS/32MD/32WD/32XD | (South Korea) An Se-young | (Japan) Akane Yamaguchi |
| 1 June | Indonesia Open (Draw): Dates: 2–7 June; Host: Jakarta, Indonesia; Venue: Istora Gelora Bung Karno; Level: Super 1000; Prize: $1,450,000; Format: 32MS/32WS/32MD/32WD/32XD | Score: 23–21, 21–12 | |
| 1 June | Indonesia Open (Draw): Dates: 2–7 June; Host: Jakarta, Indonesia; Venue: Istora Gelora Bung Karno; Level: Super 1000; Prize: $1,450,000; Format: 32MS/32WS/32MD/32WD/32XD | (Malaysia) Goh Sze Fei (Malaysia) Nur Izzuddin | (Indonesia) Raymond Indra (Indonesia) Nikolaus Joaquin |
| 1 June | Indonesia Open (Draw): Dates: 2–7 June; Host: Jakarta, Indonesia; Venue: Istora Gelora Bung Karno; Level: Super 1000; Prize: $1,450,000; Format: 32MS/32WS/32MD/32WD/32XD | Score: 13–21, 21–18, 21–10 | |
| 1 June | Indonesia Open (Draw): Dates: 2–7 June; Host: Jakarta, Indonesia; Venue: Istora Gelora Bung Karno; Level: Super 1000; Prize: $1,450,000; Format: 32MS/32WS/32MD/32WD/32XD | (Japan) Yuki Fukushima (Japan) Mayu Matsumoto | (China) Liu Shengshu (China) Tan Ning |
| 1 June | Indonesia Open (Draw): Dates: 2–7 June; Host: Jakarta, Indonesia; Venue: Istora Gelora Bung Karno; Level: Super 1000; Prize: $1,450,000; Format: 32MS/32WS/32MD/32WD/32XD | Score: 21–15, 18–21, 21–18 | |
| 1 June | Indonesia Open (Draw): Dates: 2–7 June; Host: Jakarta, Indonesia; Venue: Istora Gelora Bung Karno; Level: Super 1000; Prize: $1,450,000; Format: 32MS/32WS/32MD/32WD/32XD | (Denmark) Mathias Christiansen (Denmark) Alexandra Bøje | (China) Cheng Xing (China) Zhang Chi |
| 1 June | Indonesia Open (Draw): Dates: 2–7 June; Host: Jakarta, Indonesia; Venue: Istora Gelora Bung Karno; Level: Super 1000; Prize: $1,450,000; Format: 32MS/32WS/32MD/32WD/32XD | Score: 21–19, 23–21 | |
| 1 June | Latvia International: Dates: 3–7 June; Host: Riga, Latvia; Venue: Rimi Olympic Centre; Level: Future Series; Format: 32MS/32WS/32MD/32WD/32XD | (Chinese Taipei) Chen Yu-cheng | (Chinese Taipei) Lee Yu-jui |
| 1 June | Latvia International: Dates: 3–7 June; Host: Riga, Latvia; Venue: Rimi Olympic Centre; Level: Future Series; Format: 32MS/32WS/32MD/32WD/32XD | Score: 21–14, 17–21, 21–12 | |
| 1 June | Latvia International: Dates: 3–7 June; Host: Riga, Latvia; Venue: Rimi Olympic Centre; Level: Future Series; Format: 32MS/32WS/32MD/32WD/32XD | (Hong Kong) Ip Sum Yau | (India) Tanvi Patri |
| 1 June | Latvia International: Dates: 3–7 June; Host: Riga, Latvia; Venue: Rimi Olympic Centre; Level: Future Series; Format: 32MS/32WS/32MD/32WD/32XD | Score: 21–14, 21–16 | |
| 1 June | Latvia International: Dates: 3–7 June; Host: Riga, Latvia; Venue: Rimi Olympic Centre; Level: Future Series; Format: 32MS/32WS/32MD/32WD/32XD | (Italy) Matteo Massetti (Italy) David Salutt | (Italy) Alessandro Gozzini (Italy) Luca Zhou |
| 1 June | Latvia International: Dates: 3–7 June; Host: Riga, Latvia; Venue: Rimi Olympic Centre; Level: Future Series; Format: 32MS/32WS/32MD/32WD/32XD | Score: 21–15, 21–18 | |
| 1 June | Latvia International: Dates: 3–7 June; Host: Riga, Latvia; Venue: Rimi Olympic Centre; Level: Future Series; Format: 32MS/32WS/32MD/32WD/32XD | (Ukraine) Maria Koriagina (Ukraine) Yaroslava Vantsarovska | (Austria) Serena Au Yeong (Switzerland) Aline Müller |
| 1 June | Latvia International: Dates: 3–7 June; Host: Riga, Latvia; Venue: Rimi Olympic Centre; Level: Future Series; Format: 32MS/32WS/32MD/32WD/32XD | Score: 15–21, 21–15, 21–19 | |
| 1 June | Latvia International: Dates: 3–7 June; Host: Riga, Latvia; Venue: Rimi Olympic Centre; Level: Future Series; Format: 32MS/32WS/32MD/32WD/32XD | (Denmark) Alexander Pedersen (Austria) Serena Au Yeong | (Lithuania) Rokas Lesinskas (Ukraine) Yaroslava Vantsarovska |
| 1 June | Latvia International: Dates: 3–7 June; Host: Riga, Latvia; Venue: Rimi Olympic Centre; Level: Future Series; Format: 32MS/32WS/32MD/32WD/32XD | Score: 21–19, 21–19 | |
| 1 June | Paraguay Open: Dates: 3–7 June; Host: Ciudad del Este, Paraguay; Venue: Polideportivo de la Gobernacion de Alto Parana; Level: Future Series; Format: 32MS/32WS/32MD/32WD/32XD | (Brazil) Donnians Oliveira | (El Salvador) Uriel Canjura |
| 1 June | Paraguay Open: Dates: 3–7 June; Host: Ciudad del Este, Paraguay; Venue: Polideportivo de la Gobernacion de Alto Parana; Level: Future Series; Format: 32MS/32WS/32MD/32WD/32XD | Score: 21–19, 19–21, 21–11 | |
| 1 June | Paraguay Open: Dates: 3–7 June; Host: Ciudad del Este, Paraguay; Venue: Polideportivo de la Gobernacion de Alto Parana; Level: Future Series; Format: 32MS/32WS/32MD/32WD/32XD | (Switzerland) Jenjira Stadelmann | (Brazil) Juliana Murosaki |
| 1 June | Paraguay Open: Dates: 3–7 June; Host: Ciudad del Este, Paraguay; Venue: Polideportivo de la Gobernacion de Alto Parana; Level: Future Series; Format: 32MS/32WS/32MD/32WD/32XD | Score: 21–10, 21–10 | |
| 1 June | Paraguay Open: Dates: 3–7 June; Host: Ciudad del Este, Paraguay; Venue: Polideportivo de la Gobernacion de Alto Parana; Level: Future Series; Format: 32MS/32WS/32MD/32WD/32XD | (Brazil) Renan Melo (Brazil) Donnians Oliveira | (Brazil) Klerton Silva (Brazil) Marcos Ryan Sousa |
| 1 June | Paraguay Open: Dates: 3–7 June; Host: Ciudad del Este, Paraguay; Venue: Polideportivo de la Gobernacion de Alto Parana; Level: Future Series; Format: 32MS/32WS/32MD/32WD/32XD | Score: 21–18, 21–15 | |
| 1 June | Paraguay Open: Dates: 3–7 June; Host: Ciudad del Este, Paraguay; Venue: Polideportivo de la Gobernacion de Alto Parana; Level: Future Series; Format: 32MS/32WS/32MD/32WD/32XD | (Peru) Naomi Junco (Peru) Namie Miyahira | (Dominican Republic) Clarisa Pie (Dominican Republic) Nairoby Abigail Jiménez |
| 1 June | Paraguay Open: Dates: 3–7 June; Host: Ciudad del Este, Paraguay; Venue: Polideportivo de la Gobernacion de Alto Parana; Level: Future Series; Format: 32MS/32WS/32MD/32WD/32XD | Score: 23–25, 21–12, 21–15 | |
| 1 June | Paraguay Open: Dates: 3–7 June; Host: Ciudad del Este, Paraguay; Venue: Polideportivo de la Gobernacion de Alto Parana; Level: Future Series; Format: 32MS/32WS/32MD/32WD/32XD | (Brazil) Marcos Ryan Sousa (Brazil) Ana Júlia Ywata | (Brazil) Joaquim Mendonça (Brazil) Tamires Santos |
| 1 June | Paraguay Open: Dates: 3–7 June; Host: Ciudad del Este, Paraguay; Venue: Polideportivo de la Gobernacion de Alto Parana; Level: Future Series; Format: 32MS/32WS/32MD/32WD/32XD | Score: 18–21, 21–17, 22–20 | |
| 8 June | Australian Open (Draw): Dates: 9–14 June; Host: Sydney, Australia; Venue: State Sports Centre; Level: Super 500; Prize: $500,000; Format: 32MS/32WS/32MD/32WD/32XD | (Indonesia) Alwi Farhan | (China) Dong Tianyao |
| 8 June | Australian Open (Draw): Dates: 9–14 June; Host: Sydney, Australia; Venue: State Sports Centre; Level: Super 500; Prize: $500,000; Format: 32MS/32WS/32MD/32WD/32XD | Score: 21–13, 21–13 | |
| 8 June | Australian Open (Draw): Dates: 9–14 June; Host: Sydney, Australia; Venue: State Sports Centre; Level: Super 500; Prize: $500,000; Format: 32MS/32WS/32MD/32WD/32XD | (Japan) Akane Yamaguchi | (Thailand) Pornpawee Chochuwong |
| 8 June | Australian Open (Draw): Dates: 9–14 June; Host: Sydney, Australia; Venue: State Sports Centre; Level: Super 500; Prize: $500,000; Format: 32MS/32WS/32MD/32WD/32XD | Score: 22–20, 21–18 | |
| 8 June | Australian Open (Draw): Dates: 9–14 June; Host: Sydney, Australia; Venue: State Sports Centre; Level: Super 500; Prize: $500,000; Format: 32MS/32WS/32MD/32WD/32XD | (China) Chen Boyang (China) Liu Yi | (Indonesia) Sabar Karyaman Gutama (Indonesia) Muhammad Reza Pahlevi Isfahani |
| 8 June | Australian Open (Draw): Dates: 9–14 June; Host: Sydney, Australia; Venue: State Sports Centre; Level: Super 500; Prize: $500,000; Format: 32MS/32WS/32MD/32WD/32XD | Score: 21–15, 21–19 | |
| 8 June | Australian Open (Draw): Dates: 9–14 June; Host: Sydney, Australia; Venue: State Sports Centre; Level: Super 500; Prize: $500,000; Format: 32MS/32WS/32MD/32WD/32XD | (China) Jia Yifan (China) Zhang Shuxian | (Indonesia) Febriana Dwipuji Kusuma (Indonesia) Meilysa Trias Puspita Sari |
| 8 June | Australian Open (Draw): Dates: 9–14 June; Host: Sydney, Australia; Venue: State Sports Centre; Level: Super 500; Prize: $500,000; Format: 32MS/32WS/32MD/32WD/32XD | Score: 24–22, 21–13 | |
| 8 June | Australian Open (Draw): Dates: 9–14 June; Host: Sydney, Australia; Venue: State Sports Centre; Level: Super 500; Prize: $500,000; Format: 32MS/32WS/32MD/32WD/32XD | (China) Feng Yanzhe (China) Huang Dongping | (China) Guo Xinwa (China) Chen Fanghui |
| 8 June | Australian Open (Draw): Dates: 9–14 June; Host: Sydney, Australia; Venue: State Sports Centre; Level: Super 500; Prize: $500,000; Format: 32MS/32WS/32MD/32WD/32XD | Score: 21–17, 21–19 | |
| 8 June | Phuket International: Dates: 9–14 June; Host: Phuket, Thailand; Venue: Saphan Hin 4000 Seat Municipal Stadium; Level: International Challenge; Prize: $20,000; Format: 128MS/64WS/64MD/64WD/64XD | (Japan) Rei Miyashita | (Malaysia) Cheam June Wei |
| 8 June | Phuket International: Dates: 9–14 June; Host: Phuket, Thailand; Venue: Saphan Hin 4000 Seat Municipal Stadium; Level: International Challenge; Prize: $20,000; Format: 128MS/64WS/64MD/64WD/64XD | Score: 22–20, 14–21, 21–12 | |
| 8 June | Phuket International: Dates: 9–14 June; Host: Phuket, Thailand; Venue: Saphan Hin 4000 Seat Municipal Stadium; Level: International Challenge; Prize: $20,000; Format: 128MS/64WS/64MD/64WD/64XD | (Thailand) Thamonwan Nithiittikrai | (Thailand) Yataweemin Ketklieng |
| 8 June | Phuket International: Dates: 9–14 June; Host: Phuket, Thailand; Venue: Saphan Hin 4000 Seat Municipal Stadium; Level: International Challenge; Prize: $20,000; Format: 128MS/64WS/64MD/64WD/64XD | Score: 18–21, 21–17, 21–15 | |
| 8 June | Phuket International: Dates: 9–14 June; Host: Phuket, Thailand; Venue: Saphan Hin 4000 Seat Municipal Stadium; Level: International Challenge; Prize: $20,000; Format: 128MS/64WS/64MD/64WD/64XD | (Indonesia) M. Nawaf Khoiriyansyah (Indonesia) Adrian Pratama | (Thailand) Chayapat Piboon (Thailand) Tanadon Punpanich |
| 8 June | Phuket International: Dates: 9–14 June; Host: Phuket, Thailand; Venue: Saphan Hin 4000 Seat Municipal Stadium; Level: International Challenge; Prize: $20,000; Format: 128MS/64WS/64MD/64WD/64XD | Score: 21–14, 21–14 | |
| 8 June | Phuket International: Dates: 9–14 June; Host: Phuket, Thailand; Venue: Saphan Hin 4000 Seat Municipal Stadium; Level: International Challenge; Prize: $20,000; Format: 128MS/64WS/64MD/64WD/64XD | (Thailand) Phattharin Aiamvareesrisakul (Thailand) Sarisa Janpeng | (Thailand) Tidapron Kleebyeesun (Thailand) Nattamon Laisuan |
| 8 June | Phuket International: Dates: 9–14 June; Host: Phuket, Thailand; Venue: Saphan Hin 4000 Seat Municipal Stadium; Level: International Challenge; Prize: $20,000; Format: 128MS/64WS/64MD/64WD/64XD | Score: 20–22, 21–17, 21–15 | |
| 8 June | Phuket International: Dates: 9–14 June; Host: Phuket, Thailand; Venue: Saphan Hin 4000 Seat Municipal Stadium; Level: International Challenge; Prize: $20,000; Format: 128MS/64WS/64MD/64WD/64XD | (Thailand) Ratchapol Makkasasithorn (Thailand) Nattamon Laisuan | (South Korea) Cho Song-hyun (South Korea) Jeong Na-eun |
| 8 June | Phuket International: Dates: 9–14 June; Host: Phuket, Thailand; Venue: Saphan Hin 4000 Seat Municipal Stadium; Level: International Challenge; Prize: $20,000; Format: 128MS/64WS/64MD/64WD/64XD | Score: 21–17, 21–15 | |
| 8 June | Venezuela Future Series (cancelled): Dates: 10–14 June; Host: Maracay, Venezuela; Venue: Gimnasio Cubierto Mauricio Johnson; Level: Future Series; Format: 32MS/16WS/16MD/8WD/16XD | | |
| 8 June | Venezuela Future Series (cancelled): Dates: 10–14 June; Host: Maracay, Venezuela; Venue: Gimnasio Cubierto Mauricio Johnson; Level: Future Series; Format: 32MS/16WS/16MD/8WD/16XD | Score: | |
| 8 June | Venezuela Future Series (cancelled): Dates: 10–14 June; Host: Maracay, Venezuela; Venue: Gimnasio Cubierto Mauricio Johnson; Level: Future Series; Format: 32MS/16WS/16MD/8WD/16XD | Score: | |
| 8 June | Venezuela Future Series (cancelled): Dates: 10–14 June; Host: Maracay, Venezuela; Venue: Gimnasio Cubierto Mauricio Johnson; Level: Future Series; Format: 32MS/16WS/16MD/8WD/16XD | Score: | |
| 8 June | Venezuela Future Series (cancelled): Dates: 10–14 June; Host: Maracay, Venezuela; Venue: Gimnasio Cubierto Mauricio Johnson; Level: Future Series; Format: 32MS/16WS/16MD/8WD/16XD | Score: | |
| 8 June | Venezuela Future Series (cancelled): Dates: 10–14 June; Host: Maracay, Venezuela; Venue: Gimnasio Cubierto Mauricio Johnson; Level: Future Series; Format: 32MS/16WS/16MD/8WD/16XD | Score: | |
| 8 June | Valence Alpes International: Dates: 11–14 June; Host: Valence, France; Venue: Palais des sports Mendés-France; Level: International Challenge; Prize: $20,000; Format: 32MS/32WS/16MD/16WD/32XD | (India) Rithvik Sanjeevi | (Croatia) Aria Dinata |
| 8 June | Valence Alpes International: Dates: 11–14 June; Host: Valence, France; Venue: Palais des sports Mendés-France; Level: International Challenge; Prize: $20,000; Format: 32MS/32WS/16MD/16WD/32XD | Score: 17–21, 23–21, 21–16 | |
| 8 June | Valence Alpes International: Dates: 11–14 June; Host: Valence, France; Venue: Palais des sports Mendés-France; Level: International Challenge; Prize: $20,000; Format: 32MS/32WS/16MD/16WD/32XD | (France) Anna Tatranova | (Germany) Yvonne Li |
| 8 June | Valence Alpes International: Dates: 11–14 June; Host: Valence, France; Venue: Palais des sports Mendés-France; Level: International Challenge; Prize: $20,000; Format: 32MS/32WS/16MD/16WD/32XD | Score: 21–16, 21–19 | |
| 8 June | Valence Alpes International: Dates: 11–14 June; Host: Valence, France; Venue: Palais des sports Mendés-France; Level: International Challenge; Prize: $20,000; Format: 32MS/32WS/16MD/16WD/32XD | (France) Maël Cattoen (France) William Villeger | (France) Éloi Adam (France) Léo Rossi |
| 8 June | Valence Alpes International: Dates: 11–14 June; Host: Valence, France; Venue: Palais des sports Mendés-France; Level: International Challenge; Prize: $20,000; Format: 32MS/32WS/16MD/16WD/32XD | Score: 21–19, 12–21, 21–19 | |
| 8 June | Valence Alpes International: Dates: 11–14 June; Host: Valence, France; Venue: Palais des sports Mendés-France; Level: International Challenge; Prize: $20,000; Format: 32MS/32WS/16MD/16WD/32XD | (England) Abbygael Harris (England) Estelle van Leeuwen | (Individual Neutral Athletes) Anastasiia Boiarun (Individual Neutral Athletes) Daria Kharlampovich |
| 8 June | Valence Alpes International: Dates: 11–14 June; Host: Valence, France; Venue: Palais des sports Mendés-France; Level: International Challenge; Prize: $20,000; Format: 32MS/32WS/16MD/16WD/32XD | Score: 21–18, 21–6 | |
| 8 June | Valence Alpes International: Dates: 11–14 June; Host: Valence, France; Venue: Palais des sports Mendés-France; Level: International Challenge; Prize: $20,000; Format: 32MS/32WS/16MD/16WD/32XD | (France) Natan Begga (France) Elsa Jacob | (France) Thibault Gardon (France) Kathell Desmots-Chacun |
| 8 June | Valence Alpes International: Dates: 11–14 June; Host: Valence, France; Venue: Palais des sports Mendés-France; Level: International Challenge; Prize: $20,000; Format: 32MS/32WS/16MD/16WD/32XD | Score: 21–17, 21–15 | |
| 15 June | Macau Open (Draw): Dates: 16–21 June; Host: Macau, China; Venue: Macau East Asian Games Dome; Level: Super 300; Prize: $370,000; Format: 32MS/32WS/32MD/32WD/32XD | (China) Hu Zhe'an | (Thailand) Kantaphon Wangcharoen |
| 15 June | Macau Open (Draw): Dates: 16–21 June; Host: Macau, China; Venue: Macau East Asian Games Dome; Level: Super 300; Prize: $370,000; Format: 32MS/32WS/32MD/32WD/32XD | Score: 11–21, 21–10, 21–13 | |
| 15 June | Macau Open (Draw): Dates: 16–21 June; Host: Macau, China; Venue: Macau East Asian Games Dome; Level: Super 300; Prize: $370,000; Format: 32MS/32WS/32MD/32WD/32XD | (South Korea) Kim Ga-eun | (South Korea) Park Ga-eun |
| 15 June | Macau Open (Draw): Dates: 16–21 June; Host: Macau, China; Venue: Macau East Asian Games Dome; Level: Super 300; Prize: $370,000; Format: 32MS/32WS/32MD/32WD/32XD | Score: 21–16, 21–13 | |
| 15 June | Macau Open (Draw): Dates: 16–21 June; Host: Macau, China; Venue: Macau East Asian Games Dome; Level: Super 300; Prize: $370,000; Format: 32MS/32WS/32MD/32WD/32XD | (South Korea) Jin Yong (South Korea) Lee Jong-min | (Indonesia) Ali Faathir Rayhan (Indonesia) Devin Artha Wahyudi |
| 15 June | Macau Open (Draw): Dates: 16–21 June; Host: Macau, China; Venue: Macau East Asian Games Dome; Level: Super 300; Prize: $370,000; Format: 32MS/32WS/32MD/32WD/32XD | Score: 18–21, 21–19, 21–10 | |
| 15 June | Macau Open (Draw): Dates: 16–21 June; Host: Macau, China; Venue: Macau East Asian Games Dome; Level: Super 300; Prize: $370,000; Format: 32MS/32WS/32MD/32WD/32XD | (China) Bao Lijing (China) Cao Zihan | (China) Chen Fanshutian (China) Liu Jiayue |
| 15 June | Macau Open (Draw): Dates: 16–21 June; Host: Macau, China; Venue: Macau East Asian Games Dome; Level: Super 300; Prize: $370,000; Format: 32MS/32WS/32MD/32WD/32XD | Score: 21–18, 21–10 | |
| 15 June | Macau Open (Draw): Dates: 16–21 June; Host: Macau, China; Venue: Macau East Asian Games Dome; Level: Super 300; Prize: $370,000; Format: 32MS/32WS/32MD/32WD/32XD | (China) Jiang Zhenbang (China) Wei Yaxin | (Hong Kong) Chan Yin Chak (Hong Kong) Ng Tsz Yau |
| 15 June | Macau Open (Draw): Dates: 16–21 June; Host: Macau, China; Venue: Macau East Asian Games Dome; Level: Super 300; Prize: $370,000; Format: 32MS/32WS/32MD/32WD/32XD | Score: 21–14, 21–14 | |
| 15 June | Czech International: Dates: 18–21 June; Host: České Budějovice, Czechia; Venue: Městská sportovní hala; Level: Future Series; Format: 32MS/32WS/32MD/32WD/32XD | (Germany) Luis Pongratz | (Philippines) Jewel Angelo Albo |
| 15 June | Czech International: Dates: 18–21 June; Host: České Budějovice, Czechia; Venue: Městská sportovní hala; Level: Future Series; Format: 32MS/32WS/32MD/32WD/32XD | Score: 21–13, 21–16 | |
| 15 June | Czech International: Dates: 18–21 June; Host: České Budějovice, Czechia; Venue: Městská sportovní hala; Level: Future Series; Format: 32MS/32WS/32MD/32WD/32XD | (Vietnam) Vũ Thị Trang | (United Arab Emirates) Nurani Ratu Azzahra |
| 15 June | Czech International: Dates: 18–21 June; Host: České Budějovice, Czechia; Venue: Městská sportovní hala; Level: Future Series; Format: 32MS/32WS/32MD/32WD/32XD | Score: 21–19, 15–21, 21–16 | |
| 15 June | Czech International: Dates: 18–21 June; Host: České Budějovice, Czechia; Venue: Městská sportovní hala; Level: Future Series; Format: 32MS/32WS/32MD/32WD/32XD | (United Arab Emirates) Dev Ayyappan (United Arab Emirates) Dhiren Ayyappan | (Spain) Natxo Cervello (Spain) Alejandro Gallego |
| 15 June | Czech International: Dates: 18–21 June; Host: České Budějovice, Czechia; Venue: Městská sportovní hala; Level: Future Series; Format: 32MS/32WS/32MD/32WD/32XD | Score: 21–10, 21–9 | |
| 15 June | Czech International: Dates: 18–21 June; Host: České Budějovice, Czechia; Venue: Městská sportovní hala; Level: Future Series; Format: 32MS/32WS/32MD/32WD/32XD | (Germany) Stine Küspert (Germany) Isabel Lohau | (Czech Republic) Klára Šilhavá (Czech Republic) Radka Šilhavá |
| 15 June | Czech International: Dates: 18–21 June; Host: České Budějovice, Czechia; Venue: Městská sportovní hala; Level: Future Series; Format: 32MS/32WS/32MD/32WD/32XD | Score: 21–9, 21–7 | |
| 15 June | Czech International: Dates: 18–21 June; Host: České Budějovice, Czechia; Venue: Městská sportovní hala; Level: Future Series; Format: 32MS/32WS/32MD/32WD/32XD | (United Arab Emirates) Dhiren Ayyappan (United Arab Emirates) Taabia Khan | (Ukraine) Oleksii Titov (Ukraine) Anastasiia Alymova |
| 15 June | Czech International: Dates: 18–21 June; Host: České Budějovice, Czechia; Venue: Městská sportovní hala; Level: Future Series; Format: 32MS/32WS/32MD/32WD/32XD | Score: 21–15, 21–15 | |
| 22 June | U.S. Open (draw): Dates: 23–28 June; Host: Fullerton, California, United States; Venue: Titan Gym; Level: Super 300; Prize: $250,000; Format: 32MS/32WS/32MD/32WD/32XD | (Chinese Taipei) Su Li-yang | (India) Srikanth Kidambi |
| 22 June | U.S. Open (draw): Dates: 23–28 June; Host: Fullerton, California, United States; Venue: Titan Gym; Level: Super 300; Prize: $250,000; Format: 32MS/32WS/32MD/32WD/32XD | Score: 21–15, 16–21, 21–9 | |
| 22 June | U.S. Open (draw): Dates: 23–28 June; Host: Fullerton, California, United States; Venue: Titan Gym; Level: Super 300; Prize: $250,000; Format: 32MS/32WS/32MD/32WD/32XD | (Denmark) Line Christophersen | (Bulgaria) Kaloyana Nalbantova |
| 22 June | U.S. Open (draw): Dates: 23–28 June; Host: Fullerton, California, United States; Venue: Titan Gym; Level: Super 300; Prize: $250,000; Format: 32MS/32WS/32MD/32WD/32XD | Score: 21–16, 16–21, 21–11 | |
| 22 June | U.S. Open (draw): Dates: 23–28 June; Host: Fullerton, California, United States; Venue: Titan Gym; Level: Super 300; Prize: $250,000; Format: 32MS/32WS/32MD/32WD/32XD | (Japan) Hiroki Okamura (Japan) Kyohei Yamashita | (Chinese Taipei) Chen Zhi-ray (Chinese Taipei) Lin Yu-chieh |
| 22 June | U.S. Open (draw): Dates: 23–28 June; Host: Fullerton, California, United States; Venue: Titan Gym; Level: Super 300; Prize: $250,000; Format: 32MS/32WS/32MD/32WD/32XD | Score: 21–18, 16–21, 21–16 | |
| 22 June | U.S. Open (draw): Dates: 23–28 June; Host: Fullerton, California, United States; Venue: Titan Gym; Level: Super 300; Prize: $250,000; Format: 32MS/32WS/32MD/32WD/32XD | (Japan) Sumire Nakade (Japan) Miyu Takahashi | (Chinese Taipei) Lin Chih-chun (Chinese Taipei) Yang Chu-yun |
| 22 June | U.S. Open (draw): Dates: 23–28 June; Host: Fullerton, California, United States; Venue: Titan Gym; Level: Super 300; Prize: $250,000; Format: 32MS/32WS/32MD/32WD/32XD | Score: 21–16, 21–10 | |
| 22 June | U.S. Open (draw): Dates: 23–28 June; Host: Fullerton, California, United States; Venue: Titan Gym; Level: Super 300; Prize: $250,000; Format: 32MS/32WS/32MD/32WD/32XD | (Chinese Taipei) Liu Kuang-heng (Chinese Taipei) Hsu Yin-hui | (Chinese Taipei) Wu Hsuan-yi (Chinese Taipei) Yang Chu-yun |
| 22 June | U.S. Open (draw): Dates: 23–28 June; Host: Fullerton, California, United States; Venue: Titan Gym; Level: Super 300; Prize: $250,000; Format: 32MS/32WS/32MD/32WD/32XD | Score: 21–9, 21–11 | |
| 22 June | Italian Open: Dates: 24–28 June; Host: Bolzano, Italy; Venue: PalaResia; Level: International Series; Prize: $10,000; Format: 32MS/32WS/32MD/32WD/32XD | (Denmark) Karan Rajan | (Denmark) Victor Ørding Kauffmann |
| 22 June | Italian Open: Dates: 24–28 June; Host: Bolzano, Italy; Venue: PalaResia; Level: International Series; Prize: $10,000; Format: 32MS/32WS/32MD/32WD/32XD | Score: 21–19, 21–13 | |
| 22 June | Italian Open: Dates: 24–28 June; Host: Bolzano, Italy; Venue: PalaResia; Level: International Series; Prize: $10,000; Format: 32MS/32WS/32MD/32WD/32XD | (United Arab Emirates) Prakriti Bharath | (India) Anwesha Gowda |
| 22 June | Italian Open: Dates: 24–28 June; Host: Bolzano, Italy; Venue: PalaResia; Level: International Series; Prize: $10,000; Format: 32MS/32WS/32MD/32WD/32XD | Score: 21–19, 21–12 | |
| 22 June | Italian Open: Dates: 24–28 June; Host: Bolzano, Italy; Venue: PalaResia; Level: International Series; Prize: $10,000; Format: 32MS/32WS/32MD/32WD/32XD | (Germany) Danial Marzuan (Germany) Aaron Sonnenschein | (Germany) Malik Bourakkadi (Germany) Kenneth Neumann |
| 22 June | Italian Open: Dates: 24–28 June; Host: Bolzano, Italy; Venue: PalaResia; Level: International Series; Prize: $10,000; Format: 32MS/32WS/32MD/32WD/32XD | Score: 21–15, 19–21, 21–17 | |
| 22 June | Italian Open: Dates: 24–28 June; Host: Bolzano, Italy; Venue: PalaResia; Level: International Series; Prize: $10,000; Format: 32MS/32WS/32MD/32WD/32XD | (England) Lisa Curtin (England) Yulia Tang | (Netherlands) Kirsten de Wit (Netherlands) Debora Jille |
| 22 June | Italian Open: Dates: 24–28 June; Host: Bolzano, Italy; Venue: PalaResia; Level: International Series; Prize: $10,000; Format: 32MS/32WS/32MD/32WD/32XD | Score: 21–19, 22–20 | |
| 22 June | Italian Open: Dates: 24–28 June; Host: Bolzano, Italy; Venue: PalaResia; Level: International Series; Prize: $10,000; Format: 32MS/32WS/32MD/32WD/32XD | (Germany) Jan Colin Völker (Germany) Emma Moszczynski | (Germany) Simon Krax (Germany) Amelie Lehmann |
| 22 June | Italian Open: Dates: 24–28 June; Host: Bolzano, Italy; Venue: PalaResia; Level: International Series; Prize: $10,000; Format: 32MS/32WS/32MD/32WD/32XD | Score: 21–17, 21–13 | |
| 29 June | Canada Open (Draw): Dates: 30 June – 5 July; Host: Markham, Canada; Venue: Markham Pan Am Centre; Level: Super 300; Prize: $250,000; Format: 32MS/32WS/32MD/32WD/32XD | (Japan) Yudai Okimoto | (Japan) Riki Takei |
| 29 June | Canada Open (Draw): Dates: 30 June – 5 July; Host: Markham, Canada; Venue: Markham Pan Am Centre; Level: Super 300; Prize: $250,000; Format: 32MS/32WS/32MD/32WD/32XD | Score: 21–13, 21–3 | |
| 29 June | Canada Open (Draw): Dates: 30 June – 5 July; Host: Markham, Canada; Venue: Markham Pan Am Centre; Level: Super 300; Prize: $250,000; Format: 32MS/32WS/32MD/32WD/32XD | (Japan) Riko Gunji | (Denmark) Line Christophersen |
| 29 June | Canada Open (Draw): Dates: 30 June – 5 July; Host: Markham, Canada; Venue: Markham Pan Am Centre; Level: Super 300; Prize: $250,000; Format: 32MS/32WS/32MD/32WD/32XD | Score: 21–15, 15–21, 21–6 | |
| 29 June | Canada Open (Draw): Dates: 30 June – 5 July; Host: Markham, Canada; Venue: Markham Pan Am Centre; Level: Super 300; Prize: $250,000; Format: 32MS/32WS/32MD/32WD/32XD | (Japan) Hiroki Okamura (Japan) Kyohei Yamashita | (Denmark) Christian Faust Kjær (Denmark) Rasmus Kjær |
| 29 June | Canada Open (Draw): Dates: 30 June – 5 July; Host: Markham, Canada; Venue: Markham Pan Am Centre; Level: Super 300; Prize: $250,000; Format: 32MS/32WS/32MD/32WD/32XD | Score: 13–21, 21–10, 21–17 | |
| 29 June | Canada Open (Draw): Dates: 30 June – 5 July; Host: Markham, Canada; Venue: Markham Pan Am Centre; Level: Super 300; Prize: $250,000; Format: 32MS/32WS/32MD/32WD/32XD | (Japan) Hinata Suzuki (Japan) Nao Yamakita | (Japan) Kaho Osawa (Japan) Mai Tanabe |
| 29 June | Canada Open (Draw): Dates: 30 June – 5 July; Host: Markham, Canada; Venue: Markham Pan Am Centre; Level: Super 300; Prize: $250,000; Format: 32MS/32WS/32MD/32WD/32XD | Score: 21–15, 21–16 | |
| 29 June | Canada Open (Draw): Dates: 30 June – 5 July; Host: Markham, Canada; Venue: Markham Pan Am Centre; Level: Super 300; Prize: $250,000; Format: 32MS/32WS/32MD/32WD/32XD | (Japan) Akira Koga (Japan) Natsu Saito | (Chinese Taipei) Liu Kuang-heng (Chinese Taipei) Hsu Yin-hui |
| 29 June | Canada Open (Draw): Dates: 30 June – 5 July; Host: Markham, Canada; Venue: Markham Pan Am Centre; Level: Super 300; Prize: $250,000; Format: 32MS/32WS/32MD/32WD/32XD | Score: 21–17, 17–21, 21–17 | |
| 29 June | Perú International: Dates: 1–5 July; Host: Lima, Peru; Venue: Villa Deportiva Nacional; Level: International Series; Prize: $10,000; Format: 32MS/32WS/16MD/16WD/32XD | (Italy) Giovanni Toti | (Sri Lanka) Dumindu Abeywickrama |
| 29 June | Perú International: Dates: 1–5 July; Host: Lima, Peru; Venue: Villa Deportiva Nacional; Level: International Series; Prize: $10,000; Format: 32MS/32WS/16MD/16WD/32XD | Score: 21–15, 21–16 | |
| 29 June | Perú International: Dates: 1–5 July; Host: Lima, Peru; Venue: Villa Deportiva Nacional; Level: International Series; Prize: $10,000; Format: 32MS/32WS/16MD/16WD/32XD | (Switzerland) Jenjira Stadelmann | (France) Romane Cloteaux-Foucault |
| 29 June | Perú International: Dates: 1–5 July; Host: Lima, Peru; Venue: Villa Deportiva Nacional; Level: International Series; Prize: $10,000; Format: 32MS/32WS/16MD/16WD/32XD | Score: 17–21, 21–9, 21–18 | |
| 29 June | Perú International: Dates: 1–5 July; Host: Lima, Peru; Venue: Villa Deportiva Nacional; Level: International Series; Prize: $10,000; Format: 32MS/32WS/16MD/16WD/32XD | (United States) Ryan Nibu (United States) Joshua Yang | (Guatemala) Christopher Martínez (Guatemala) Jonathan Solís |
| 29 June | Perú International: Dates: 1–5 July; Host: Lima, Peru; Venue: Villa Deportiva Nacional; Level: International Series; Prize: $10,000; Format: 32MS/32WS/16MD/16WD/32XD | Score: 21–18, 21–17 | |
| 29 June | Perú International: Dates: 1–5 July; Host: Lima, Peru; Venue: Villa Deportiva Nacional; Level: International Series; Prize: $10,000; Format: 32MS/32WS/16MD/16WD/32XD | (Guatemala) Diana Corleto (Guatemala) Nikté Sotomayor | (Peru) Fernanda Munar (Peru) Rafaela Munar |
| 29 June | Perú International: Dates: 1–5 July; Host: Lima, Peru; Venue: Villa Deportiva Nacional; Level: International Series; Prize: $10,000; Format: 32MS/32WS/16MD/16WD/32XD | Score: 21–9, 22–20 | |
| 29 June | Perú International: Dates: 1–5 July; Host: Lima, Peru; Venue: Villa Deportiva Nacional; Level: International Series; Prize: $10,000; Format: 32MS/32WS/16MD/16WD/32XD | (Guatemala) Christopher Martínez (Guatemala) Diana Corleto | (Italy) Giovanni Toti (Italy) Fernanda Saponara |
| 29 June | Perú International: Dates: 1–5 July; Host: Lima, Peru; Venue: Villa Deportiva Nacional; Level: International Series; Prize: $10,000; Format: 32MS/32WS/16MD/16WD/32XD | Score: 19–21, 21–19, 21–11 | |
| 29 June | Future Series Nouvelle-Aquitaine: Dates: 2–5 July; Host: Pessac, France; Venue: Salle Bellegrave; Level: Future Series; Format: 32MS/32WS/32MD/32WD/32XD | (Denmark) Victor Ørding Kauffmann | (Netherlands) Noah Haase |
| 29 June | Future Series Nouvelle-Aquitaine: Dates: 2–5 July; Host: Pessac, France; Venue: Salle Bellegrave; Level: Future Series; Format: 32MS/32WS/32MD/32WD/32XD | Score: 21–12, 12–21, 21–16 | |
| 29 June | Future Series Nouvelle-Aquitaine: Dates: 2–5 July; Host: Pessac, France; Venue: Salle Bellegrave; Level: Future Series; Format: 32MS/32WS/32MD/32WD/32XD | (Vietnam) Vũ Thị Trang | (Bulgaria) Hristomira Popovska |
| 29 June | Future Series Nouvelle-Aquitaine: Dates: 2–5 July; Host: Pessac, France; Venue: Salle Bellegrave; Level: Future Series; Format: 32MS/32WS/32MD/32WD/32XD | Score: 21–6, 21–14 | |
| 29 June | Future Series Nouvelle-Aquitaine: Dates: 2–5 July; Host: Pessac, France; Venue: Salle Bellegrave; Level: Future Series; Format: 32MS/32WS/32MD/32WD/32XD | (France) Rayan Benaissa (France) Mady Sow | (Spain) Jesús de Burgos (Spain) Adolfo López |
| 29 June | Future Series Nouvelle-Aquitaine: Dates: 2–5 July; Host: Pessac, France; Venue: Salle Bellegrave; Level: Future Series; Format: 32MS/32WS/32MD/32WD/32XD | Score: 21–15, 16–21, 21–18 | |
| 29 June | Future Series Nouvelle-Aquitaine: Dates: 2–5 July; Host: Pessac, France; Venue: Salle Bellegrave; Level: Future Series; Format: 32MS/32WS/32MD/32WD/32XD | (Netherlands) Kirsten de Wit (Netherlands) Meerte Loos | (England) Lisa Curtin (England) Yulia Tang |
| 29 June | Future Series Nouvelle-Aquitaine: Dates: 2–5 July; Host: Pessac, France; Venue: Salle Bellegrave; Level: Future Series; Format: 32MS/32WS/32MD/32WD/32XD | Score: 21–18, 20–22, 21–12 | |
| 29 June | Future Series Nouvelle-Aquitaine: Dates: 2–5 July; Host: Pessac, France; Venue: Salle Bellegrave; Level: Future Series; Format: 32MS/32WS/32MD/32WD/32XD | (Netherlands) Joep Strooper (Netherlands) Sterre Bang | (France) Orphé Queton-Bouissou (France) Marjolene Raffin |
| 29 June | Future Series Nouvelle-Aquitaine: Dates: 2–5 July; Host: Pessac, France; Venue: Salle Bellegrave; Level: Future Series; Format: 32MS/32WS/32MD/32WD/32XD | Score: 21–16, 21–17 | |

=== July ===
| Week commencing | Tournament | Champions | Runners-up |
|---|---|---|---|
| 13 July | Japan Open (Draw): Dates: 14–19 July; Host: Tokyo, Japan; Venue: Tokyo Metropolitan Gymnasium; Level: Super 750; Prize: $950,000; Format: 32MS/32WS/32MD/32WD/32XD | (France) Christo Popov | (Japan) Koki Watanabe |
| 13 July | Japan Open (Draw): Dates: 14–19 July; Host: Tokyo, Japan; Venue: Tokyo Metropolitan Gymnasium; Level: Super 750; Prize: $950,000; Format: 32MS/32WS/32MD/32WD/32XD | Score: 21–11, 21–19 | |
| 13 July | Japan Open (Draw): Dates: 14–19 July; Host: Tokyo, Japan; Venue: Tokyo Metropolitan Gymnasium; Level: Super 750; Prize: $950,000; Format: 32MS/32WS/32MD/32WD/32XD | (India) P. V. Sindhu | (Japan) Akane Yamaguchi |
| 13 July | Japan Open (Draw): Dates: 14–19 July; Host: Tokyo, Japan; Venue: Tokyo Metropolitan Gymnasium; Level: Super 750; Prize: $950,000; Format: 32MS/32WS/32MD/32WD/32XD | Score: 21–17, 21–17 | |
| 13 July | Japan Open (Draw): Dates: 14–19 July; Host: Tokyo, Japan; Venue: Tokyo Metropolitan Gymnasium; Level: Super 750; Prize: $950,000; Format: 32MS/32WS/32MD/32WD/32XD | (Indonesia) Fajar Alfian (Indonesia) Muhammad Shohibul Fikri | (South Korea) Kim Won-ho (South Korea) Seo Seung-jae |
| 13 July | Japan Open (Draw): Dates: 14–19 July; Host: Tokyo, Japan; Venue: Tokyo Metropolitan Gymnasium; Level: Super 750; Prize: $950,000; Format: 32MS/32WS/32MD/32WD/32XD | Score: 21–19, 21–17 | |
| 13 July | Japan Open (Draw): Dates: 14–19 July; Host: Tokyo, Japan; Venue: Tokyo Metropolitan Gymnasium; Level: Super 750; Prize: $950,000; Format: 32MS/32WS/32MD/32WD/32XD | (South Korea) Kim Hye-jeong (South Korea) Kong Hee-yong | (China) Jia Yifan (China) Zhang Shuxian |
| 13 July | Japan Open (Draw): Dates: 14–19 July; Host: Tokyo, Japan; Venue: Tokyo Metropolitan Gymnasium; Level: Super 750; Prize: $950,000; Format: 32MS/32WS/32MD/32WD/32XD | Score: 14–21, 21–15, 30–29 | |
| 13 July | Japan Open (Draw): Dates: 14–19 July; Host: Tokyo, Japan; Venue: Tokyo Metropolitan Gymnasium; Level: Super 750; Prize: $950,000; Format: 32MS/32WS/32MD/32WD/32XD | (China) Feng Yanzhe (China) Huang Dongping | (Hong Kong) Tang Chun Man (Hong Kong) Tse Ying Suet |
| 13 July | Japan Open (Draw): Dates: 14–19 July; Host: Tokyo, Japan; Venue: Tokyo Metropolitan Gymnasium; Level: Super 750; Prize: $950,000; Format: 32MS/32WS/32MD/32WD/32XD | Score: 21–14, 14–21, 21–15 | |
| 13 July | Northern Marianas Open: Dates: 14–19 July; Host: Saipan, Northern Mariana Islands; Venue: Gilbert C. Ada Gymnasium; Level: International Challenge; Prize: $20,000; Format: 64MS/32WS/32MD/16WD/32XD | (South Korea) Park Sang-yong | (Japan) Koo Takahashi |
| 13 July | Northern Marianas Open: Dates: 14–19 July; Host: Saipan, Northern Mariana Islands; Venue: Gilbert C. Ada Gymnasium; Level: International Challenge; Prize: $20,000; Format: 64MS/32WS/32MD/16WD/32XD | Score: 21–19, 19–21, 21–15 | |
| 13 July | Northern Marianas Open: Dates: 14–19 July; Host: Saipan, Northern Mariana Islands; Venue: Gilbert C. Ada Gymnasium; Level: International Challenge; Prize: $20,000; Format: 64MS/32WS/32MD/16WD/32XD | (Japan) Sakura Masuki | (Japan) Nodoka Sunakawa |
| 13 July | Northern Marianas Open: Dates: 14–19 July; Host: Saipan, Northern Mariana Islands; Venue: Gilbert C. Ada Gymnasium; Level: International Challenge; Prize: $20,000; Format: 64MS/32WS/32MD/16WD/32XD | Score: 21–15, 21–14 | |
| 13 July | Northern Marianas Open: Dates: 14–19 July; Host: Saipan, Northern Mariana Islands; Venue: Gilbert C. Ada Gymnasium; Level: International Challenge; Prize: $20,000; Format: 64MS/32WS/32MD/16WD/32XD | (Japan) Tori Aizawa (Japan) Daisuke Sano | (South Korea) Jin Sung-ik (South Korea) Lee Hyeong-woo |
| 13 July | Northern Marianas Open: Dates: 14–19 July; Host: Saipan, Northern Mariana Islands; Venue: Gilbert C. Ada Gymnasium; Level: International Challenge; Prize: $20,000; Format: 64MS/32WS/32MD/16WD/32XD | Score: 21–19, 13–21, 21–16 | |
| 13 July | Northern Marianas Open: Dates: 14–19 July; Host: Saipan, Northern Mariana Islands; Venue: Gilbert C. Ada Gymnasium; Level: International Challenge; Prize: $20,000; Format: 64MS/32WS/32MD/16WD/32XD | (South Korea) Moon In-seo (South Korea) Park Seul | (Japan) Miki Kanehiro (Japan) Yuna Kato |
| 13 July | Northern Marianas Open: Dates: 14–19 July; Host: Saipan, Northern Mariana Islands; Venue: Gilbert C. Ada Gymnasium; Level: International Challenge; Prize: $20,000; Format: 64MS/32WS/32MD/16WD/32XD | Score: 21–16, 17–21, 21–15 | |
| 13 July | Northern Marianas Open: Dates: 14–19 July; Host: Saipan, Northern Mariana Islands; Venue: Gilbert C. Ada Gymnasium; Level: International Challenge; Prize: $20,000; Format: 64MS/32WS/32MD/16WD/32XD | (South Korea) Lee Hyeong-woo (South Korea) Park Seul | (Japan) Tori Aizawa (Japan) Hina Osawa |
| 13 July | Northern Marianas Open: Dates: 14–19 July; Host: Saipan, Northern Mariana Islands; Venue: Gilbert C. Ada Gymnasium; Level: International Challenge; Prize: $20,000; Format: 64MS/32WS/32MD/16WD/32XD | Score: 21–11, 21–18 | |
| 20 July | Saipan International: Dates: 21–25 July; Host: Saipan, Northern Mariana Islands; Venue: Gilbert C. Ada Gymnasium; Level: International Challenge; Prize: $20,000; Format: 64MS/32WS/32MD/16WD/32XD | (Japan) Shogo Ogawa | (South Korea) Park Sang-yong |
| 20 July | Saipan International: Dates: 21–25 July; Host: Saipan, Northern Mariana Islands; Venue: Gilbert C. Ada Gymnasium; Level: International Challenge; Prize: $20,000; Format: 64MS/32WS/32MD/16WD/32XD | Score: 12–21, 21–19, 21–18 | |
| 20 July | Saipan International: Dates: 21–25 July; Host: Saipan, Northern Mariana Islands; Venue: Gilbert C. Ada Gymnasium; Level: International Challenge; Prize: $20,000; Format: 64MS/32WS/32MD/16WD/32XD | (Japan) Sakura Masuki | (Japan) Nodoka Sunakawa |
| 20 July | Saipan International: Dates: 21–25 July; Host: Saipan, Northern Mariana Islands; Venue: Gilbert C. Ada Gymnasium; Level: International Challenge; Prize: $20,000; Format: 64MS/32WS/32MD/16WD/32XD | Score: 21–13, 21–16 | |
| 20 July | Saipan International: Dates: 21–25 July; Host: Saipan, Northern Mariana Islands; Venue: Gilbert C. Ada Gymnasium; Level: International Challenge; Prize: $20,000; Format: 64MS/32WS/32MD/16WD/32XD | (Chinese Taipei) Wei Chun-wei (Chinese Taipei) Yang Po-chih | (Japan) Tori Aizawa (Japan) Daisuke Sano |
| 20 July | Saipan International: Dates: 21–25 July; Host: Saipan, Northern Mariana Islands; Venue: Gilbert C. Ada Gymnasium; Level: International Challenge; Prize: $20,000; Format: 64MS/32WS/32MD/16WD/32XD | Score: 21–16, 22–20 | |
| 20 July | Saipan International: Dates: 21–25 July; Host: Saipan, Northern Mariana Islands; Venue: Gilbert C. Ada Gymnasium; Level: International Challenge; Prize: $20,000; Format: 64MS/32WS/32MD/16WD/32XD | (Japan) Mio Konegawa (Japan) An Uesugi | (Japan) Mikoto Aiso (Japan) Momoha Niimi |
| 20 July | Saipan International: Dates: 21–25 July; Host: Saipan, Northern Mariana Islands; Venue: Gilbert C. Ada Gymnasium; Level: International Challenge; Prize: $20,000; Format: 64MS/32WS/32MD/16WD/32XD | Score: Walkover | |
| 20 July | Saipan International: Dates: 21–25 July; Host: Saipan, Northern Mariana Islands; Venue: Gilbert C. Ada Gymnasium; Level: International Challenge; Prize: $20,000; Format: 64MS/32WS/32MD/16WD/32XD | (South Korea) Jo Song-hyun (South Korea) Jeong Na-eun | (Japan) Yuto Nakashizu (Japan) Mao Yamakita |
| 20 July | Saipan International: Dates: 21–25 July; Host: Saipan, Northern Mariana Islands; Venue: Gilbert C. Ada Gymnasium; Level: International Challenge; Prize: $20,000; Format: 64MS/32WS/32MD/16WD/32XD | Score: 21–13, 21–15 | |
| 20 July | China Open (Draw): Dates: 21–26 July; Host: Changzhou, Jiangsu, China; Venue: Changzhou Olympic Sports Centre; Level: Super 1000; Prize: $2,000,000; Format: 32MS/32WS/32MD/32WD/32XD | (Chinese Taipei) Chou Tien-chen | (France) Toma Junior Popov |
| 20 July | China Open (Draw): Dates: 21–26 July; Host: Changzhou, Jiangsu, China; Venue: Changzhou Olympic Sports Centre; Level: Super 1000; Prize: $2,000,000; Format: 32MS/32WS/32MD/32WD/32XD | Score: 21–15, 7–21, 21–13 | |
| 20 July | China Open (Draw): Dates: 21–26 July; Host: Changzhou, Jiangsu, China; Venue: Changzhou Olympic Sports Centre; Level: Super 1000; Prize: $2,000,000; Format: 32MS/32WS/32MD/32WD/32XD | (Japan) Akane Yamaguchi | (China) Chen Yufei |
| 20 July | China Open (Draw): Dates: 21–26 July; Host: Changzhou, Jiangsu, China; Venue: Changzhou Olympic Sports Centre; Level: Super 1000; Prize: $2,000,000; Format: 32MS/32WS/32MD/32WD/32XD | Score: 21–18, 21–16 | |
| 20 July | China Open (Draw): Dates: 21–26 July; Host: Changzhou, Jiangsu, China; Venue: Changzhou Olympic Sports Centre; Level: Super 1000; Prize: $2,000,000; Format: 32MS/32WS/32MD/32WD/32XD | (Indonesia) Fajar Alfian (Indonesia) Muhammad Shohibul Fikri | (South Korea) Kim Won-ho (South Korea) Seo Seung-jae |
| 20 July | China Open (Draw): Dates: 21–26 July; Host: Changzhou, Jiangsu, China; Venue: Changzhou Olympic Sports Centre; Level: Super 1000; Prize: $2,000,000; Format: 32MS/32WS/32MD/32WD/32XD | Score: 16–21, 21–19, 21–19 | |
| 20 July | China Open (Draw): Dates: 21–26 July; Host: Changzhou, Jiangsu, China; Venue: Changzhou Olympic Sports Centre; Level: Super 1000; Prize: $2,000,000; Format: 32MS/32WS/32MD/32WD/32XD | (China) Liu Shengshu (China) Tan Ning | (Japan) Yuki Fukushima (Japan) Mayu Matsumoto |
| 20 July | China Open (Draw): Dates: 21–26 July; Host: Changzhou, Jiangsu, China; Venue: Changzhou Olympic Sports Centre; Level: Super 1000; Prize: $2,000,000; Format: 32MS/32WS/32MD/32WD/32XD | Score: 21–14, 21–19 | |
| 20 July | China Open (Draw): Dates: 21–26 July; Host: Changzhou, Jiangsu, China; Venue: Changzhou Olympic Sports Centre; Level: Super 1000; Prize: $2,000,000; Format: 32MS/32WS/32MD/32WD/32XD | (China) Guo Xinwa (China) Chen Fanghui | (China) Feng Yanzhe (China) Huang Dongping |
| 20 July | China Open (Draw): Dates: 21–26 July; Host: Changzhou, Jiangsu, China; Venue: Changzhou Olympic Sports Centre; Level: Super 1000; Prize: $2,000,000; Format: 32MS/32WS/32MD/32WD/32XD | Score: 25–23, 20–22, 21–15 | |
| 20 July | Mauritius International (cancelled): Dates: 23–26 July; Host: Rose Hill, Mauritius; Venue: National Badminton Centre; Level: Future Series; Format: 32MS/32WS/32MD/16WD/32XD | | |
| 20 July | Mauritius International (cancelled): Dates: 23–26 July; Host: Rose Hill, Mauritius; Venue: National Badminton Centre; Level: Future Series; Format: 32MS/32WS/32MD/16WD/32XD | Score: | |
| 20 July | Mauritius International (cancelled): Dates: 23–26 July; Host: Rose Hill, Mauritius; Venue: National Badminton Centre; Level: Future Series; Format: 32MS/32WS/32MD/16WD/32XD | Score: | |
| 20 July | Mauritius International (cancelled): Dates: 23–26 July; Host: Rose Hill, Mauritius; Venue: National Badminton Centre; Level: Future Series; Format: 32MS/32WS/32MD/16WD/32XD | Score: | |
| 20 July | Mauritius International (cancelled): Dates: 23–26 July; Host: Rose Hill, Mauritius; Venue: National Badminton Centre; Level: Future Series; Format: 32MS/32WS/32MD/16WD/32XD | Score: | |
| 20 July | Mauritius International (cancelled): Dates: 23–26 July; Host: Rose Hill, Mauritius; Venue: National Badminton Centre; Level: Future Series; Format: 32MS/32WS/32MD/16WD/32XD | Score: | |
| 27 July | Taipei Open (Draw): Dates: 28 July – 2 August; Host: Taipei, Taiwan; Venue: Taipei Arena; Level: Super 300; Prize: $250,000; Format: 32MS/32WS/32MD/32WD/32XD | (Japan) Yudai Okimoto | (South Korea) Yoo Tae-bin |
| 27 July | Taipei Open (Draw): Dates: 28 July – 2 August; Host: Taipei, Taiwan; Venue: Taipei Arena; Level: Super 300; Prize: $250,000; Format: 32MS/32WS/32MD/32WD/32XD | Score: 21–19, 21–12 | |
| 27 July | Taipei Open (Draw): Dates: 28 July – 2 August; Host: Taipei, Taiwan; Venue: Taipei Arena; Level: Super 300; Prize: $250,000; Format: 32MS/32WS/32MD/32WD/32XD | (India) Tanvi Sharma | (Vietnam) Nguyễn Thùy Linh |
| 27 July | Taipei Open (Draw): Dates: 28 July – 2 August; Host: Taipei, Taiwan; Venue: Taipei Arena; Level: Super 300; Prize: $250,000; Format: 32MS/32WS/32MD/32WD/32XD | Score: 21–16, 21–16 | |
| 27 July | Taipei Open (Draw): Dates: 28 July – 2 August; Host: Taipei, Taiwan; Venue: Taipei Arena; Level: Super 300; Prize: $250,000; Format: 32MS/32WS/32MD/32WD/32XD | (Indonesia) Leo Rolly Carnando (Indonesia) Daniel Marthin | (Malaysia) Aaron Chia (Malaysia) Aaron Tai |
| 27 July | Taipei Open (Draw): Dates: 28 July – 2 August; Host: Taipei, Taiwan; Venue: Taipei Arena; Level: Super 300; Prize: $250,000; Format: 32MS/32WS/32MD/32WD/32XD | Score: 23–21, 21–19 | |
| 27 July | Taipei Open (Draw): Dates: 28 July – 2 August; Host: Taipei, Taiwan; Venue: Taipei Arena; Level: Super 300; Prize: $250,000; Format: 32MS/32WS/32MD/32WD/32XD | (Japan) Sumire Nakade (Japan) Miyu Takahashi | (Malaysia) Pearly Tan (Malaysia) Thinaah Muralitharan |
| 27 July | Taipei Open (Draw): Dates: 28 July – 2 August; Host: Taipei, Taiwan; Venue: Taipei Arena; Level: Super 300; Prize: $250,000; Format: 32MS/32WS/32MD/32WD/32XD | Score: 21–16, 21–18 | |
| 27 July | Taipei Open (Draw): Dates: 28 July – 2 August; Host: Taipei, Taiwan; Venue: Taipei Arena; Level: Super 300; Prize: $250,000; Format: 32MS/32WS/32MD/32WD/32XD | (Japan) Yuta Watanabe (Japan) Maya Taguchi | (Chinese Taipei) Yang Po-hsuan (Chinese Taipei) Hu Ling-fang |
| 27 July | Taipei Open (Draw): Dates: 28 July – 2 August; Host: Taipei, Taiwan; Venue: Taipei Arena; Level: Super 300; Prize: $250,000; Format: 32MS/32WS/32MD/32WD/32XD | Score: 21–19, 21–8 | |
| 27 July | Philippine International: Dates: 28 July – 2 August; Host: Manila, Philippines; Venue: Gameville Central Park; Level: International Challenge; Prize: $20,000; Format: 64MS/32WS/32MD/32WD/32XD | (India) Ginpaul Sonna | (India) Aryamann Tandon |
| 27 July | Philippine International: Dates: 28 July – 2 August; Host: Manila, Philippines; Venue: Gameville Central Park; Level: International Challenge; Prize: $20,000; Format: 64MS/32WS/32MD/32WD/32XD | Score: 25–23, 13–21, 21–16 | |
| 27 July | Philippine International: Dates: 28 July – 2 August; Host: Manila, Philippines; Venue: Gameville Central Park; Level: International Challenge; Prize: $20,000; Format: 64MS/32WS/32MD/32WD/32XD | (Thailand) Sarunrak Vitidsarn | (Thailand) Tidapron Kleebyeesun |
| 27 July | Philippine International: Dates: 28 July – 2 August; Host: Manila, Philippines; Venue: Gameville Central Park; Level: International Challenge; Prize: $20,000; Format: 64MS/32WS/32MD/32WD/32XD | Score: 21–9, 21–23, 21–16 | |
| 27 July | Philippine International: Dates: 28 July – 2 August; Host: Manila, Philippines; Venue: Gameville Central Park; Level: International Challenge; Prize: $20,000; Format: 64MS/32WS/32MD/32WD/32XD | (Malaysia) Choong Hon Jian (Malaysia) Wong Vin Sean | (Indonesia) Taufik Aderya (Indonesia) Alexius Ongkytama Subagio |
| 27 July | Philippine International: Dates: 28 July – 2 August; Host: Manila, Philippines; Venue: Gameville Central Park; Level: International Challenge; Prize: $20,000; Format: 64MS/32WS/32MD/32WD/32XD | Score: 21–16, 13–21, 21–15 | |
| 27 July | Philippine International: Dates: 28 July – 2 August; Host: Manila, Philippines; Venue: Gameville Central Park; Level: International Challenge; Prize: $20,000; Format: 64MS/32WS/32MD/32WD/32XD | (India) Treesa Jolly (India) Gayatri Gopichand | (Japan) Miki Kanehiro (Japan) Yuna Kato |
| 27 July | Philippine International: Dates: 28 July – 2 August; Host: Manila, Philippines; Venue: Gameville Central Park; Level: International Challenge; Prize: $20,000; Format: 64MS/32WS/32MD/32WD/32XD | Score: 16–21, 21–4, 21–17 | |
| 27 July | Philippine International: Dates: 28 July – 2 August; Host: Manila, Philippines; Venue: Gameville Central Park; Level: International Challenge; Prize: $20,000; Format: 64MS/32WS/32MD/32WD/32XD | (Malaysia) Goh Boon Zhe (Malaysia) Dania Sofea | (Thailand) Phuwanat Horbanluekit (Thailand) Fungfa Korpthammakit |
| 27 July | Philippine International: Dates: 28 July – 2 August; Host: Manila, Philippines; Venue: Gameville Central Park; Level: International Challenge; Prize: $20,000; Format: 64MS/32WS/32MD/32WD/32XD | Score: 21–4, 21–14 | |

=== August ===
| Week commencing | Tournament | Champions | Runners-up |
|---|---|---|---|
| 3 August | Korea Masters (Draw): Dates: 4–9 August; Host: Asan, Korea; Venue: Asan Yi Sun-sin Gymnasium; Level: Super 300; Prize: $250,000; Format: 32MS/32WS/32MD/32WD/32XD | (China) Zhu Xuanchen | (South Korea) Yoo Tae-bin |
| 3 August | Korea Masters (Draw): Dates: 4–9 August; Host: Asan, Korea; Venue: Asan Yi Sun-sin Gymnasium; Level: Super 300; Prize: $250,000; Format: 32MS/32WS/32MD/32WD/32XD | Score: 21–16, 23–21 | |
| 3 August | Korea Masters (Draw): Dates: 4–9 August; Host: Asan, Korea; Venue: Asan Yi Sun-sin Gymnasium; Level: Super 300; Prize: $250,000; Format: 32MS/32WS/32MD/32WD/32XD | (India) Ashmita Chaliha | (China) Han Qianxi |
| 3 August | Korea Masters (Draw): Dates: 4–9 August; Host: Asan, Korea; Venue: Asan Yi Sun-sin Gymnasium; Level: Super 300; Prize: $250,000; Format: 32MS/32WS/32MD/32WD/32XD | Score: 14–21, 21–14, 21–14 | |
| 3 August | Korea Masters (Draw): Dates: 4–9 August; Host: Asan, Korea; Venue: Asan Yi Sun-sin Gymnasium; Level: Super 300; Prize: $250,000; Format: 32MS/32WS/32MD/32WD/32XD | (Malaysia) Tee Kai Wun (Malaysia) Yap Roy King | (Malaysia) Man Wei Chong (Malaysia) Soh Wooi Yik |
| 3 August | Korea Masters (Draw): Dates: 4–9 August; Host: Asan, Korea; Venue: Asan Yi Sun-sin Gymnasium; Level: Super 300; Prize: $250,000; Format: 32MS/32WS/32MD/32WD/32XD | Score: 21–13, 21–18 | |
| 3 August | Korea Masters (Draw): Dates: 4–9 August; Host: Asan, Korea; Venue: Asan Yi Sun-sin Gymnasium; Level: Super 300; Prize: $250,000; Format: 32MS/32WS/32MD/32WD/32XD | (China) Luo Yi (China) Wang Tingge | (Thailand) Benyapa Aimsaard (Thailand) Nuntakarn Aimsaard |
| 3 August | Korea Masters (Draw): Dates: 4–9 August; Host: Asan, Korea; Venue: Asan Yi Sun-sin Gymnasium; Level: Super 300; Prize: $250,000; Format: 32MS/32WS/32MD/32WD/32XD | Score: 17–21, 21–19, 21–14 | |
| 3 August | Korea Masters (Draw): Dates: 4–9 August; Host: Asan, Korea; Venue: Asan Yi Sun-sin Gymnasium; Level: Super 300; Prize: $250,000; Format: 32MS/32WS/32MD/32WD/32XD | (Japan) Yuta Watanabe (Japan) Maya Taguchi | (South Korea) Kim Jae-hyeon (South Korea) Jang Ha-jeong |
| 3 August | Korea Masters (Draw): Dates: 4–9 August; Host: Asan, Korea; Venue: Asan Yi Sun-sin Gymnasium; Level: Super 300; Prize: $250,000; Format: 32MS/32WS/32MD/32WD/32XD | Score: 21–19, 21–14 | |
| 3 August | Jamaica International: Dates: 5–9 August; Host: Kingston, Jamaica; Venue: Alfred Sangster Auditorium; Level: International Series; Prize: $10,000; Format: 32MS/32WS/32MD/16WD/32XD | (Switzerland) Julien Scheiwiller | (United States) Joshua Yang |
| 3 August | Jamaica International: Dates: 5–9 August; Host: Kingston, Jamaica; Venue: Alfred Sangster Auditorium; Level: International Series; Prize: $10,000; Format: 32MS/32WS/32MD/16WD/32XD | Score: Walkover | |
| 3 August | Jamaica International: Dates: 5–9 August; Host: Kingston, Jamaica; Venue: Alfred Sangster Auditorium; Level: International Series; Prize: $10,000; Format: 32MS/32WS/32MD/16WD/32XD | (Peru) Inés Castillo | (United States) Disha Gupta |
| 3 August | Jamaica International: Dates: 5–9 August; Host: Kingston, Jamaica; Venue: Alfred Sangster Auditorium; Level: International Series; Prize: $10,000; Format: 32MS/32WS/32MD/16WD/32XD | Score: 22–20, 17–6 (retired) | |
| 3 August | Jamaica International: Dates: 5–9 August; Host: Kingston, Jamaica; Venue: Alfred Sangster Auditorium; Level: International Series; Prize: $10,000; Format: 32MS/32WS/32MD/16WD/32XD | (India) Sai Pratheek K. (India) Ruban Kumar | (United States) Srinivas Subash (United States) Joshua Yang |
| 3 August | Jamaica International: Dates: 5–9 August; Host: Kingston, Jamaica; Venue: Alfred Sangster Auditorium; Level: International Series; Prize: $10,000; Format: 32MS/32WS/32MD/16WD/32XD | Score: Walkover | |
| 3 August | Jamaica International: Dates: 5–9 August; Host: Kingston, Jamaica; Venue: Alfred Sangster Auditorium; Level: International Series; Prize: $10,000; Format: 32MS/32WS/32MD/16WD/32XD | (United States) Sydney Li (United States) Katelin Ngo | (Peru) Naomi Junco (Peru) Namie Miyahira |
| 3 August | Jamaica International: Dates: 5–9 August; Host: Kingston, Jamaica; Venue: Alfred Sangster Auditorium; Level: International Series; Prize: $10,000; Format: 32MS/32WS/32MD/16WD/32XD | Score: 19–21, 21–19, 21–16 | |
| 3 August | Jamaica International: Dates: 5–9 August; Host: Kingston, Jamaica; Venue: Alfred Sangster Auditorium; Level: International Series; Prize: $10,000; Format: 32MS/32WS/32MD/16WD/32XD | (Jamaica) Joel Angus (Jamaica) Tahlia Richardson | (Jamaica) Kenneth Anglin (Jamaica) Breanna Bisnott |
| 3 August | Jamaica International: Dates: 5–9 August; Host: Kingston, Jamaica; Venue: Alfred Sangster Auditorium; Level: International Series; Prize: $10,000; Format: 32MS/32WS/32MD/16WD/32XD | Score: 16–21, 21–16, 21–9 | |
| 10 August | Bolivia International: Dates: 11–15 August; Host: Sucre, Bolivia; Venue: Coliseo de Badminton Max Toledo; Level: Future Series; Format: 32MS/16WS/8MD/8WD/16XD | (Malta) Matthew Abela | (Paraguay) Leo Lee |
| 10 August | Bolivia International: Dates: 11–15 August; Host: Sucre, Bolivia; Venue: Coliseo de Badminton Max Toledo; Level: Future Series; Format: 32MS/16WS/8MD/8WD/16XD | Score: 21–9, 15–21, 21–16 | |
| 10 August | Bolivia International: Dates: 11–15 August; Host: Sucre, Bolivia; Venue: Coliseo de Badminton Max Toledo; Level: Future Series; Format: 32MS/16WS/8MD/8WD/16XD | (Colombia) Juliana Giraldo | (Poland) Gabriela Skorkowska |
| 10 August | Bolivia International: Dates: 11–15 August; Host: Sucre, Bolivia; Venue: Coliseo de Badminton Max Toledo; Level: Future Series; Format: 32MS/16WS/8MD/8WD/16XD | Score: 21–18, 21–17 | |
| 10 August | Bolivia International: Dates: 11–15 August; Host: Sucre, Bolivia; Venue: Coliseo de Badminton Max Toledo; Level: Future Series; Format: 32MS/16WS/8MD/8WD/16XD | (Bolivia) Jorge Alejandro Paniagua Palma (Bolivia) Gabriel Danilo Rosales Medina | (Bolivia) Leonardo David Colque Solís (Bolivia) Rolando Villagra Jalacori |
| 10 August | Bolivia International: Dates: 11–15 August; Host: Sucre, Bolivia; Venue: Coliseo de Badminton Max Toledo; Level: Future Series; Format: 32MS/16WS/8MD/8WD/16XD | Score: 21–15, 21–19 | |
| 10 August | Bolivia International: Dates: 11–15 August; Host: Sucre, Bolivia; Venue: Coliseo de Badminton Max Toledo; Level: Future Series; Format: 32MS/16WS/8MD/8WD/16XD | (Bolivia) Camila Lucero Mullisaca Quispe (Bolivia) Juanita Siviora | (Bolivia) Dara Carla Flores Gonzales (Bolivia) Araceli Betania Liceras Taboada |
| 10 August | Bolivia International: Dates: 11–15 August; Host: Sucre, Bolivia; Venue: Coliseo de Badminton Max Toledo; Level: Future Series; Format: 32MS/16WS/8MD/8WD/16XD | Score: 21–3, 21–6 | |
| 10 August | Bolivia International: Dates: 11–15 August; Host: Sucre, Bolivia; Venue: Coliseo de Badminton Max Toledo; Level: Future Series; Format: 32MS/16WS/8MD/8WD/16XD | (Malta) Matthew Abela (Poland) Gabriela Skorkowska | (Bolivia) Gabriel Danilo Rosales Medina (Bolivia) Juanita Siviora |
| 10 August | Bolivia International: Dates: 11–15 August; Host: Sucre, Bolivia; Venue: Coliseo de Badminton Max Toledo; Level: Future Series; Format: 32MS/16WS/8MD/8WD/16XD | Score: 21–16, 21–18 | |
| 10 August | Malaysia International: Dates: 11–16 August; Host: Ipoh, Malaysia; Venue: Arena Badminton Perak; Level: International Challenge; Prize: $20,000; Format: 64MS/32WS/32MD/32WD/32XD | (Japan) Shogo Ogawa | (Japan) Kosuke Masumoto |
| 10 August | Malaysia International: Dates: 11–16 August; Host: Ipoh, Malaysia; Venue: Arena Badminton Perak; Level: International Challenge; Prize: $20,000; Format: 64MS/32WS/32MD/32WD/32XD | Score: 21–17, 18–21, 21–15 | |
| 10 August | Malaysia International: Dates: 11–16 August; Host: Ipoh, Malaysia; Venue: Arena Badminton Perak; Level: International Challenge; Prize: $20,000; Format: 64MS/32WS/32MD/32WD/32XD | (Thailand) Sarunrak Vitidsarn | (Thailand) Anyapat Phichitpreechasak |
| 10 August | Malaysia International: Dates: 11–16 August; Host: Ipoh, Malaysia; Venue: Arena Badminton Perak; Level: International Challenge; Prize: $20,000; Format: 64MS/32WS/32MD/32WD/32XD | Score: 21–15, 21–10 | |
| 10 August | Malaysia International: Dates: 11–16 August; Host: Ipoh, Malaysia; Venue: Arena Badminton Perak; Level: International Challenge; Prize: $20,000; Format: 64MS/32WS/32MD/32WD/32XD | (Japan) Naoya Kawashima (Japan) Kota Ogawa | (Malaysia) Choong Hon Jian (Malaysia) Wong Vin Sean |
| 10 August | Malaysia International: Dates: 11–16 August; Host: Ipoh, Malaysia; Venue: Arena Badminton Perak; Level: International Challenge; Prize: $20,000; Format: 64MS/32WS/32MD/32WD/32XD | Score: 21–17, 10–21, 23–21 | |
| 10 August | Malaysia International: Dates: 11–16 August; Host: Ipoh, Malaysia; Venue: Arena Badminton Perak; Level: International Challenge; Prize: $20,000; Format: 64MS/32WS/32MD/32WD/32XD | (Japan) Mikoto Aiso (Japan) Momoha Niimi | (Japan) Miki Kanehiro (Japan) Yuna Kato |
| 10 August | Malaysia International: Dates: 11–16 August; Host: Ipoh, Malaysia; Venue: Arena Badminton Perak; Level: International Challenge; Prize: $20,000; Format: 64MS/32WS/32MD/32WD/32XD | Score: 21–17, 21–15 | |
| 10 August | Malaysia International: Dates: 11–16 August; Host: Ipoh, Malaysia; Venue: Arena Badminton Perak; Level: International Challenge; Prize: $20,000; Format: 64MS/32WS/32MD/32WD/32XD | (Japan) Kota Ogawa (Japan) Misaki Kurashima | (Thailand) Thanadol Yunmongkol (Thailand) Nattamon Laisuan |
| 10 August | Malaysia International: Dates: 11–16 August; Host: Ipoh, Malaysia; Venue: Arena Badminton Perak; Level: International Challenge; Prize: $20,000; Format: 64MS/32WS/32MD/32WD/32XD | Score: 15–21, 25–23, 21–10 | |
| 10 August | Ghana International: Dates: 12–16 August; Host: Accra, Ghana; Venue: Borteyman Sports Complex; Level: International Series; Prize: $10,000; Format: 32MS/32WS/32MD/8WD/16XD | (United Arab Emirates) Riyan Malhan | (United Arab Emirates) Dev Vishnu |
| 10 August | Ghana International: Dates: 12–16 August; Host: Accra, Ghana; Venue: Borteyman Sports Complex; Level: International Series; Prize: $10,000; Format: 32MS/32WS/32MD/8WD/16XD | Score: 21–10, 21–14 | |
| 10 August | Ghana International: Dates: 12–16 August; Host: Accra, Ghana; Venue: Borteyman Sports Complex; Level: International Series; Prize: $10,000; Format: 32MS/32WS/32MD/8WD/16XD | (United Arab Emirates) Nurani Ratu Azzahra | (France) Romane Cloteaux-Foucault |
| 10 August | Ghana International: Dates: 12–16 August; Host: Accra, Ghana; Venue: Borteyman Sports Complex; Level: International Series; Prize: $10,000; Format: 32MS/32WS/32MD/8WD/16XD | Score: 21–10, 21–23, 21–10 | |
| 10 August | Ghana International: Dates: 12–16 August; Host: Accra, Ghana; Venue: Borteyman Sports Complex; Level: International Series; Prize: $10,000; Format: 32MS/32WS/32MD/8WD/16XD | (India) Abhyuday Choudhary (India) Ayush Makhija | (Nigeria) Joseph Abel (Nigeria) Segun Obasanjo Idowu |
| 10 August | Ghana International: Dates: 12–16 August; Host: Accra, Ghana; Venue: Borteyman Sports Complex; Level: International Series; Prize: $10,000; Format: 32MS/32WS/32MD/8WD/16XD | Score: 21–16, 21–14 | |
| 10 August | Ghana International: Dates: 12–16 August; Host: Accra, Ghana; Venue: Borteyman Sports Complex; Level: International Series; Prize: $10,000; Format: 32MS/32WS/32MD/8WD/16XD | (Ghana) Moslena Adu (Ghana) Rachael Quarcoo | (Ghana) Victoria Asmah (Ghana) Alana Faith Sullo |
| 10 August | Ghana International: Dates: 12–16 August; Host: Accra, Ghana; Venue: Borteyman Sports Complex; Level: International Series; Prize: $10,000; Format: 32MS/32WS/32MD/8WD/16XD | Score: 21–10, 21–6 | |
| 10 August | Ghana International: Dates: 12–16 August; Host: Accra, Ghana; Venue: Borteyman Sports Complex; Level: International Series; Prize: $10,000; Format: 32MS/32WS/32MD/8WD/16XD | (United Arab Emirates) Shashaank Sai Munnangi (Australia) Supriya Yellapragada | (Uganda) Muzafaru Lubega (Uganda) Gladys Mbabazi |
| 10 August | Ghana International: Dates: 12–16 August; Host: Accra, Ghana; Venue: Borteyman Sports Complex; Level: International Series; Prize: $10,000; Format: 32MS/32WS/32MD/8WD/16XD | Score: 21–17, 15–21, 21–13 | |
| 17 August | World Championships (Draw): Dates: 17–23 August; Host: New Delhi, India; Venue: Indira Gandhi Arena; Level: World Championships; Prize: N/A; Format: 64MS/64WS/64MD/64WD/64XD | (France) Alex Lanier | (Japan) Kodai Naraoka |
| 17 August | World Championships (Draw): Dates: 17–23 August; Host: New Delhi, India; Venue: Indira Gandhi Arena; Level: World Championships; Prize: N/A; Format: 64MS/64WS/64MD/64WD/64XD | Score: 21–11, 21–11 | |
| 17 August | World Championships (Draw): Dates: 17–23 August; Host: New Delhi, India; Venue: Indira Gandhi Arena; Level: World Championships; Prize: N/A; Format: 64MS/64WS/64MD/64WD/64XD | (South Korea) An Se-young | (Japan) Akane Yamaguchi |
| 17 August | World Championships (Draw): Dates: 17–23 August; Host: New Delhi, India; Venue: Indira Gandhi Arena; Level: World Championships; Prize: N/A; Format: 64MS/64WS/64MD/64WD/64XD | Score: 21–17, 21–14 | |
| 17 August | World Championships (Draw): Dates: 17–23 August; Host: New Delhi, India; Venue: Indira Gandhi Arena; Level: World Championships; Prize: N/A; Format: 64MS/64WS/64MD/64WD/64XD | (China) Liang Weikeng (China) Wang Chang | (Malaysia) Aaron Chia (Malaysia) Soh Wooi Yik |
| 17 August | World Championships (Draw): Dates: 17–23 August; Host: New Delhi, India; Venue: Indira Gandhi Arena; Level: World Championships; Prize: N/A; Format: 64MS/64WS/64MD/64WD/64XD | Score: 21–17, 21–16 | |
| 17 August | World Championships (Draw): Dates: 17–23 August; Host: New Delhi, India; Venue: Indira Gandhi Arena; Level: World Championships; Prize: N/A; Format: 64MS/64WS/64MD/64WD/64XD | (South Korea) Baek Ha-na (South Korea) Lee So-hee | (China) Liu Shengshu (China) Tan Ning |
| 17 August | World Championships (Draw): Dates: 17–23 August; Host: New Delhi, India; Venue: Indira Gandhi Arena; Level: World Championships; Prize: N/A; Format: 64MS/64WS/64MD/64WD/64XD | Score: 21–15, 21–15 | |
| 17 August | World Championships (Draw): Dates: 17–23 August; Host: New Delhi, India; Venue: Indira Gandhi Arena; Level: World Championships; Prize: N/A; Format: 64MS/64WS/64MD/64WD/64XD | (France) Thom Gicquel (France) Delphine Delrue | (China) Feng Yanzhe (China) Huang Dongping |
| 17 August | World Championships (Draw): Dates: 17–23 August; Host: New Delhi, India; Venue: Indira Gandhi Arena; Level: World Championships; Prize: N/A; Format: 64MS/64WS/64MD/64WD/64XD | Score: 22–20, 19–21, 21–15 | |
| 17 August | Singapore International II: Dates: 18–23 August; Host: Singapore, Singapore; Venue: Wyse Active Hub; Level: International Challenge; Prize: $33,800; Format: 128MS/32WS/32MD/16WD/32XD | (Japan) Riku Hatano | (South Korea) Park Sang-yong |
| 17 August | Singapore International II: Dates: 18–23 August; Host: Singapore, Singapore; Venue: Wyse Active Hub; Level: International Challenge; Prize: $33,800; Format: 128MS/32WS/32MD/16WD/32XD | Score: 21–16, 14–21, 21–8 | |
| 17 August | Singapore International II: Dates: 18–23 August; Host: Singapore, Singapore; Venue: Wyse Active Hub; Level: International Challenge; Prize: $33,800; Format: 128MS/32WS/32MD/16WD/32XD | (Japan) Manami Suizu | (India) Tanvi Patri |
| 17 August | Singapore International II: Dates: 18–23 August; Host: Singapore, Singapore; Venue: Wyse Active Hub; Level: International Challenge; Prize: $33,800; Format: 128MS/32WS/32MD/16WD/32XD | Score: 19–21, 21–16, 21–14 | |
| 17 August | Singapore International II: Dates: 18–23 August; Host: Singapore, Singapore; Venue: Wyse Active Hub; Level: International Challenge; Prize: $33,800; Format: 128MS/32WS/32MD/16WD/32XD | (Japan) Takuto Goto (Japan) Tsubasa Yoshida | (Japan) Kazuki Shibata (Japan) Naoki Yamada |
| 17 August | Singapore International II: Dates: 18–23 August; Host: Singapore, Singapore; Venue: Wyse Active Hub; Level: International Challenge; Prize: $33,800; Format: 128MS/32WS/32MD/16WD/32XD | Score: 21–12, 10–21, 24–22 | |
| 17 August | Singapore International II: Dates: 18–23 August; Host: Singapore, Singapore; Venue: Wyse Active Hub; Level: International Challenge; Prize: $33,800; Format: 128MS/32WS/32MD/16WD/32XD | (Japan) Himeka Hashimura (Japan) Mao Yamakita | (Australia) Laudya Chelsea Griselda (Australia) Nozomi Shimizu |
| 17 August | Singapore International II: Dates: 18–23 August; Host: Singapore, Singapore; Venue: Wyse Active Hub; Level: International Challenge; Prize: $33,800; Format: 128MS/32WS/32MD/16WD/32XD | Score: 21–16, 21–10 | |
| 17 August | Singapore International II: Dates: 18–23 August; Host: Singapore, Singapore; Venue: Wyse Active Hub; Level: International Challenge; Prize: $33,800; Format: 128MS/32WS/32MD/16WD/32XD | (Japan) Mutsuki Ampo (Japan) Hina Osawa | (Japan) Naoya Kawashima (Japan) Moe Aoki |
| 17 August | Singapore International II: Dates: 18–23 August; Host: Singapore, Singapore; Venue: Wyse Active Hub; Level: International Challenge; Prize: $33,800; Format: 128MS/32WS/32MD/16WD/32XD | Score: Walkover | |
| 17 August | Vietnam International (Bắc Ninh): Dates: 18–23 August; Host: Bắc Ninh, Vietnam; Venue: Bắc Ninh Sports Training and Competition Center No. 1; Level: International Series; Prize: $10,000; Format: 64MS/32WS/32MD/32WD/32XD | (India) Dhruv Negi | (South Korea) Lee Yun-gyu |
| 17 August | Vietnam International (Bắc Ninh): Dates: 18–23 August; Host: Bắc Ninh, Vietnam; Venue: Bắc Ninh Sports Training and Competition Center No. 1; Level: International Series; Prize: $10,000; Format: 64MS/32WS/32MD/32WD/32XD | Score: 18–21, 21–18, 21–15 | |
| 17 August | Vietnam International (Bắc Ninh): Dates: 18–23 August; Host: Bắc Ninh, Vietnam; Venue: Bắc Ninh Sports Training and Competition Center No. 1; Level: International Series; Prize: $10,000; Format: 64MS/32WS/32MD/32WD/32XD | (Thailand) Tidapron Kleebyeesun | (Thailand) Sarunrak Vitidsarn |
| 17 August | Vietnam International (Bắc Ninh): Dates: 18–23 August; Host: Bắc Ninh, Vietnam; Venue: Bắc Ninh Sports Training and Competition Center No. 1; Level: International Series; Prize: $10,000; Format: 64MS/32WS/32MD/32WD/32XD | Score: 13–21, 21–16, 21–15 | |
| 17 August | Vietnam International (Bắc Ninh): Dates: 18–23 August; Host: Bắc Ninh, Vietnam; Venue: Bắc Ninh Sports Training and Competition Center No. 1; Level: International Series; Prize: $10,000; Format: 64MS/32WS/32MD/32WD/32XD | (South Korea) Choi Sol-gyu (South Korea) Lim Su-min | (Hong Kong) Michaelangelo Njoto (Hong Kong) Jerry Yu |
| 17 August | Vietnam International (Bắc Ninh): Dates: 18–23 August; Host: Bắc Ninh, Vietnam; Venue: Bắc Ninh Sports Training and Competition Center No. 1; Level: International Series; Prize: $10,000; Format: 64MS/32WS/32MD/32WD/32XD | Score: 17–21, 21–18, 21–17 | |
| 17 August | Vietnam International (Bắc Ninh): Dates: 18–23 August; Host: Bắc Ninh, Vietnam; Venue: Bắc Ninh Sports Training and Competition Center No. 1; Level: International Series; Prize: $10,000; Format: 64MS/32WS/32MD/32WD/32XD | (Thailand) Tidapron Kleebyeesun (Thailand) Nattamon Laisuan | (South Korea) Ji Young-bin (South Korea) Lee Ye-na |
| 17 August | Vietnam International (Bắc Ninh): Dates: 18–23 August; Host: Bắc Ninh, Vietnam; Venue: Bắc Ninh Sports Training and Competition Center No. 1; Level: International Series; Prize: $10,000; Format: 64MS/32WS/32MD/32WD/32XD | Score: 18–21, 27–25, 21–10 | |
| 17 August | Vietnam International (Bắc Ninh): Dates: 18–23 August; Host: Bắc Ninh, Vietnam; Venue: Bắc Ninh Sports Training and Competition Center No. 1; Level: International Series; Prize: $10,000; Format: 64MS/32WS/32MD/32WD/32XD | (South Korea) Lim Su-min (South Korea) Kim Hye-rin | (Hong Kong) Ko Shing Hei (Hong Kong) Hung Ho Yan |
| 17 August | Vietnam International (Bắc Ninh): Dates: 18–23 August; Host: Bắc Ninh, Vietnam; Venue: Bắc Ninh Sports Training and Competition Center No. 1; Level: International Series; Prize: $10,000; Format: 64MS/32WS/32MD/32WD/32XD | Score: 21–17, 13–21, 21–11 | |
| 17 August | Dominican International: Dates: 19–23 August; Host: Dominican Republic, Dominican Republic; Venue: TBC; Level: Future Series; Format: 32MS/32WS/16MD/16WD/16XD | (United States) Jay Chun | (France) Yohan Barbieri |
| 17 August | Dominican International: Dates: 19–23 August; Host: Dominican Republic, Dominican Republic; Venue: TBC; Level: Future Series; Format: 32MS/32WS/16MD/16WD/16XD | Score: 21–15, 21–12 | |
| 17 August | Dominican International: Dates: 19–23 August; Host: Dominican Republic, Dominican Republic; Venue: TBC; Level: Future Series; Format: 32MS/32WS/16MD/16WD/16XD | (Switzerland) Jenjira Stadelmann | (Colombia) Juliana Giraldo |
| 17 August | Dominican International: Dates: 19–23 August; Host: Dominican Republic, Dominican Republic; Venue: TBC; Level: Future Series; Format: 32MS/32WS/16MD/16WD/16XD | Score: 21–11, 21–11 | |
| 17 August | Dominican International: Dates: 19–23 August; Host: Dominican Republic, Dominican Republic; Venue: TBC; Level: Future Series; Format: 32MS/32WS/16MD/16WD/16XD | (Argentina) Nicolas Oliva (Argentina) Santiago Otero | (Dominican Republic) Victor Ovalles (Dominican Republic) Ernick Zorrilla |
| 17 August | Dominican International: Dates: 19–23 August; Host: Dominican Republic, Dominican Republic; Venue: TBC; Level: Future Series; Format: 32MS/32WS/16MD/16WD/16XD | Score: 24–22, 21–19 | |
| 17 August | Dominican International: Dates: 19–23 August; Host: Dominican Republic, Dominican Republic; Venue: TBC; Level: Future Series; Format: 32MS/32WS/16MD/16WD/16XD | (Dominican Republic) Alissa Acosta (Dominican Republic) Daniela Acosta | (Dominican Republic) Clarisa Pie (Dominican Republic) Nairoby Abigail Jiménez |
| 17 August | Dominican International: Dates: 19–23 August; Host: Dominican Republic, Dominican Republic; Venue: TBC; Level: Future Series; Format: 32MS/32WS/16MD/16WD/16XD | Score: 21–16, 21–13 | |
| 17 August | Dominican International: Dates: 19–23 August; Host: Dominican Republic, Dominican Republic; Venue: TBC; Level: Future Series; Format: 32MS/32WS/16MD/16WD/16XD | (Dominican Republic) Yonatan Linarez (Dominican Republic) Nairoby Abigail Jiménez | (Argentina) Nicolas Oliva (Argentina) Ailén Oliva |
| 17 August | Dominican International: Dates: 19–23 August; Host: Dominican Republic, Dominican Republic; Venue: TBC; Level: Future Series; Format: 32MS/32WS/16MD/16WD/16XD | Score: 21–19, 21–19 | |
| 17 August | 2026 Mediterranean Games (Draw): Dates: 22–28 August; Host: Taranto, Italy; Venue: Palazzetto dello Sport; Level: Multi-Sport Games; Format: 32MS/32WS/32MD/32WD/32XD | (Italy) Fabio Caponio | (Croatia) Aria Dinata |
| 17 August | 2026 Mediterranean Games (Draw): Dates: 22–28 August; Host: Taranto, Italy; Venue: Palazzetto dello Sport; Level: Multi-Sport Games; Format: 32MS/32WS/32MD/32WD/32XD | Score: 22–20, 21–19 | |
| 17 August | 2026 Mediterranean Games (Draw): Dates: 22–28 August; Host: Taranto, Italy; Venue: Palazzetto dello Sport; Level: Multi-Sport Games; Format: 32MS/32WS/32MD/32WD/32XD | (Turkey) Neslihan Arın | (Italy) Yasmine Hamza |
| 17 August | 2026 Mediterranean Games (Draw): Dates: 22–28 August; Host: Taranto, Italy; Venue: Palazzetto dello Sport; Level: Multi-Sport Games; Format: 32MS/32WS/32MD/32WD/32XD | Score: 21–17, 21–15 | |
| 17 August | 2026 Mediterranean Games (Draw): Dates: 22–28 August; Host: Taranto, Italy; Venue: Palazzetto dello Sport; Level: Multi-Sport Games; Format: 32MS/32WS/32MD/32WD/32XD | (Turkey) Buğra Aktaş (Turkey) Emre Sönmez | (Algeria) Koceila Mammeri (Algeria) Youcef Sabri Medel |
| 17 August | 2026 Mediterranean Games (Draw): Dates: 22–28 August; Host: Taranto, Italy; Venue: Palazzetto dello Sport; Level: Multi-Sport Games; Format: 32MS/32WS/32MD/32WD/32XD | Score: 21–19, 21–19 | |
| 17 August | 2026 Mediterranean Games (Draw): Dates: 22–28 August; Host: Taranto, Italy; Venue: Palazzetto dello Sport; Level: Multi-Sport Games; Format: 32MS/32WS/32MD/32WD/32XD | (Turkey) Bengisu Erçetin (Turkey) Nazlıcan İnci | (France) Agathe Cuevas (France) Elsa Jacob |
| 17 August | 2026 Mediterranean Games (Draw): Dates: 22–28 August; Host: Taranto, Italy; Venue: Palazzetto dello Sport; Level: Multi-Sport Games; Format: 32MS/32WS/32MD/32WD/32XD | Score: 21–17, 21–17 | |
| 17 August | 2026 Mediterranean Games (Draw): Dates: 22–28 August; Host: Taranto, Italy; Venue: Palazzetto dello Sport; Level: Multi-Sport Games; Format: 32MS/32WS/32MD/32WD/32XD | (Turkey) Emre Sönmez (Turkey) Yasemen Bektaş | (France) Natan Begga (France) Elsa Jacob |
| 17 August | 2026 Mediterranean Games (Draw): Dates: 22–28 August; Host: Taranto, Italy; Venue: Palazzetto dello Sport; Level: Multi-Sport Games; Format: 32MS/32WS/32MD/32WD/32XD | Score: 21–16, 15–21, 21–17 | |
| 24 August | Indonesia International I: Dates: 25–30 August; Host: Pontianak, Indonesia; Venue: GOR Terpadu Ahmad Yani; Level: International Challenge; Prize: $20,000; Format: 64MS/64WS/64MD/32WD/32XD | (Indonesia) Richie Duta Richardo | (India) Ginpaul Sonna |
| 24 August | Indonesia International I: Dates: 25–30 August; Host: Pontianak, Indonesia; Venue: GOR Terpadu Ahmad Yani; Level: International Challenge; Prize: $20,000; Format: 64MS/64WS/64MD/32WD/32XD | Score: 24–22, 21–19 | |
| 24 August | Indonesia International I: Dates: 25–30 August; Host: Pontianak, Indonesia; Venue: GOR Terpadu Ahmad Yani; Level: International Challenge; Prize: $20,000; Format: 64MS/64WS/64MD/32WD/32XD | (India) Tanvi Patri | (South Korea) Kim Min-sun |
| 24 August | Indonesia International I: Dates: 25–30 August; Host: Pontianak, Indonesia; Venue: GOR Terpadu Ahmad Yani; Level: International Challenge; Prize: $20,000; Format: 64MS/64WS/64MD/32WD/32XD | Score: 21–5, 21–6 | |
| 24 August | Indonesia International I: Dates: 25–30 August; Host: Pontianak, Indonesia; Venue: GOR Terpadu Ahmad Yani; Level: International Challenge; Prize: $20,000; Format: 64MS/64WS/64MD/32WD/32XD | (Indonesia) Wahyu Agung Prasetyo (Indonesia) Pulung Ramadhan | (Indonesia) Yeremia Rambitan (Indonesia) Patra Harapan Rindorindo |
| 24 August | Indonesia International I: Dates: 25–30 August; Host: Pontianak, Indonesia; Venue: GOR Terpadu Ahmad Yani; Level: International Challenge; Prize: $20,000; Format: 64MS/64WS/64MD/32WD/32XD | Score: 22–20, 21–15 | |
| 24 August | Indonesia International I: Dates: 25–30 August; Host: Pontianak, Indonesia; Venue: GOR Terpadu Ahmad Yani; Level: International Challenge; Prize: $20,000; Format: 64MS/64WS/64MD/32WD/32XD | (South Korea) Kim Yu-jung (South Korea) Lee Yu-lim | (Chinese Taipei) Tsai Ruo-lin (Chinese Taipei) Wang Yi-zhen |
| 24 August | Indonesia International I: Dates: 25–30 August; Host: Pontianak, Indonesia; Venue: GOR Terpadu Ahmad Yani; Level: International Challenge; Prize: $20,000; Format: 64MS/64WS/64MD/32WD/32XD | Score: 21–5, 21–14 | |
| 24 August | Indonesia International I: Dates: 25–30 August; Host: Pontianak, Indonesia; Venue: GOR Terpadu Ahmad Yani; Level: International Challenge; Prize: $20,000; Format: 64MS/64WS/64MD/32WD/32XD | (Indonesia) Dejan Ferdinansyah (Indonesia) Apriyani Rahayu | (Chinese Taipei) Lin Sheng-ming (Chinese Taipei) Sun Liang-ching |
| 24 August | Indonesia International I: Dates: 25–30 August; Host: Pontianak, Indonesia; Venue: GOR Terpadu Ahmad Yani; Level: International Challenge; Prize: $20,000; Format: 64MS/64WS/64MD/32WD/32XD | Score: 19–21, 27–25, 21–19 | |
| 24 August | Lagos International: Dates: 26–29 August; Host: Lagos, Nigeria; Venue: Okoya Thomas Hall; Level: International Challenge; Prize: $20,000; Format: 32MS/32WS/32MD/16WD/16XD | (India) Tankara Gnana Dattu Talasila | (India) Hmar Lalthazuala |
| 24 August | Lagos International: Dates: 26–29 August; Host: Lagos, Nigeria; Venue: Okoya Thomas Hall; Level: International Challenge; Prize: $20,000; Format: 32MS/32WS/32MD/16WD/16XD | Score: 21–9, 22–20 | |
| 24 August | Lagos International: Dates: 26–29 August; Host: Lagos, Nigeria; Venue: Okoya Thomas Hall; Level: International Challenge; Prize: $20,000; Format: 32MS/32WS/32MD/16WD/16XD | (United Arab Emirates) Prakriti Bharath | (Czech Republic) Petra Maixnerová |
| 24 August | Lagos International: Dates: 26–29 August; Host: Lagos, Nigeria; Venue: Okoya Thomas Hall; Level: International Challenge; Prize: $20,000; Format: 32MS/32WS/32MD/16WD/16XD | Score: 21–14, 21–13 | |
| 24 August | Lagos International: Dates: 26–29 August; Host: Lagos, Nigeria; Venue: Okoya Thomas Hall; Level: International Challenge; Prize: $20,000; Format: 32MS/32WS/32MD/16WD/16XD | (Thailand) Thanawin Madee (Thailand) Pongsakorn Thongkham | (United Arab Emirates) Bharath Latheesh (United Arab Emirates) Dev Vishnu |
| 24 August | Lagos International: Dates: 26–29 August; Host: Lagos, Nigeria; Venue: Okoya Thomas Hall; Level: International Challenge; Prize: $20,000; Format: 32MS/32WS/32MD/16WD/16XD | Score: 21–19, 21–14 | |
| 24 August | Lagos International: Dates: 26–29 August; Host: Lagos, Nigeria; Venue: Okoya Thomas Hall; Level: International Challenge; Prize: $20,000; Format: 32MS/32WS/32MD/16WD/16XD | (India) Rutaparna Panda (India) Swetaparna Panda | (India) Kavipriya Selvam (India) Simran Singhi |
| 24 August | Lagos International: Dates: 26–29 August; Host: Lagos, Nigeria; Venue: Okoya Thomas Hall; Level: International Challenge; Prize: $20,000; Format: 32MS/32WS/32MD/16WD/16XD | Score: 21–14, 25–23 | |
| 24 August | Lagos International: Dates: 26–29 August; Host: Lagos, Nigeria; Venue: Okoya Thomas Hall; Level: International Challenge; Prize: $20,000; Format: 32MS/32WS/32MD/16WD/16XD | (India) Dhruv Rawat (India) K. Maneesha | (India) Sathwik Reddy Kanapuram (India) Radhika Sharma |
| 24 August | Lagos International: Dates: 26–29 August; Host: Lagos, Nigeria; Venue: Okoya Thomas Hall; Level: International Challenge; Prize: $20,000; Format: 32MS/32WS/32MD/16WD/16XD | Score: 21–18, 17–21, 16–11 (retired) | |
| 24 August | Mexico Future Series: Dates: 26–30 August; Host: Aguascalientes, Mexico; Venue: Gimnasio Olimpico; Level: Future Series; Format: 32MS/32WS/16MD/16WD/16XD | (Japan) Shunki Hagiwara | (Japan) Akio Yamaguchi |
| 24 August | Mexico Future Series: Dates: 26–30 August; Host: Aguascalientes, Mexico; Venue: Gimnasio Olimpico; Level: Future Series; Format: 32MS/32WS/16MD/16WD/16XD | Score: 21–15, 21–14 | |
| 24 August | Mexico Future Series: Dates: 26–30 August; Host: Aguascalientes, Mexico; Venue: Gimnasio Olimpico; Level: Future Series; Format: 32MS/32WS/16MD/16WD/16XD | (Japan) Saki Matsumoto | (Japan) Yuzuno Watanabe |
| 24 August | Mexico Future Series: Dates: 26–30 August; Host: Aguascalientes, Mexico; Venue: Gimnasio Olimpico; Level: Future Series; Format: 32MS/32WS/16MD/16WD/16XD | Score: 21–15, 18–21, 21–16 | |
| 24 August | Mexico Future Series: Dates: 26–30 August; Host: Aguascalientes, Mexico; Venue: Gimnasio Olimpico; Level: Future Series; Format: 32MS/32WS/16MD/16WD/16XD | (Japan) Mahiro Oku (Japan) Masato Yamashiro | (Japan) Shunki Hagiwara (Japan) Mahiro Matsumoto |
| 24 August | Mexico Future Series: Dates: 26–30 August; Host: Aguascalientes, Mexico; Venue: Gimnasio Olimpico; Level: Future Series; Format: 32MS/32WS/16MD/16WD/16XD | Score: 21–16, 21–19 | |
| 24 August | Mexico Future Series: Dates: 26–30 August; Host: Aguascalientes, Mexico; Venue: Gimnasio Olimpico; Level: Future Series; Format: 32MS/32WS/16MD/16WD/16XD | (Japan) Meisa Anami (Japan) Ria Haga | (Japan) Saki Matsumoto (Japan) Yurika Nagafuchi |
| 24 August | Mexico Future Series: Dates: 26–30 August; Host: Aguascalientes, Mexico; Venue: Gimnasio Olimpico; Level: Future Series; Format: 32MS/32WS/16MD/16WD/16XD | Score: 21–11, 22–20 | |
| 24 August | Mexico Future Series: Dates: 26–30 August; Host: Aguascalientes, Mexico; Venue: Gimnasio Olimpico; Level: Future Series; Format: 32MS/32WS/16MD/16WD/16XD | (Japan) Mahiro Oku (Japan) Ria Haga | (Japan) Masato Yamashiro (Japan) Meisa Anami |
| 24 August | Mexico Future Series: Dates: 26–30 August; Host: Aguascalientes, Mexico; Venue: Gimnasio Olimpico; Level: Future Series; Format: 32MS/32WS/16MD/16WD/16XD | Score: 21–18, 21–13 | |

=== September ===
| Week commencing | Tournament | Champions | Runners-up |
|---|---|---|---|
| 31 August | China Masters (Draw): Dates: 1–6 September; Host: Shenzhen, China; Venue: Shenzhen Arena; Level: Super 750; Prize: $1,250,000; Format: 32MS/32WS/32MD/32WD/32XD | (Hong Kong) Jason Gunawan | (Hong Kong) Lee Cheuk Yiu |
| 31 August | China Masters (Draw): Dates: 1–6 September; Host: Shenzhen, China; Venue: Shenzhen Arena; Level: Super 750; Prize: $1,250,000; Format: 32MS/32WS/32MD/32WD/32XD | Score: 21–9, 21–16 | |
| 31 August | China Masters (Draw): Dates: 1–6 September; Host: Shenzhen, China; Venue: Shenzhen Arena; Level: Super 750; Prize: $1,250,000; Format: 32MS/32WS/32MD/32WD/32XD | (South Korea) An Se-young | (Japan) Tomoka Miyazaki |
| 31 August | China Masters (Draw): Dates: 1–6 September; Host: Shenzhen, China; Venue: Shenzhen Arena; Level: Super 750; Prize: $1,250,000; Format: 32MS/32WS/32MD/32WD/32XD | Score: 21–17, 21–6 | |
| 31 August | China Masters (Draw): Dates: 1–6 September; Host: Shenzhen, China; Venue: Shenzhen Arena; Level: Super 750; Prize: $1,250,000; Format: 32MS/32WS/32MD/32WD/32XD | (India) Satwiksairaj Rankireddy (India) Chirag Shetty | (China) He Jiting (China) Ren Xiangyu |
| 31 August | China Masters (Draw): Dates: 1–6 September; Host: Shenzhen, China; Venue: Shenzhen Arena; Level: Super 750; Prize: $1,250,000; Format: 32MS/32WS/32MD/32WD/32XD | Score: 11–21, 21–13, 21–17 | |
| 31 August | China Masters (Draw): Dates: 1–6 September; Host: Shenzhen, China; Venue: Shenzhen Arena; Level: Super 750; Prize: $1,250,000; Format: 32MS/32WS/32MD/32WD/32XD | (Japan) Sumire Nakade (Japan) Miyu Takahashi | (China) Bao Lijing (China) Cao Zihan |
| 31 August | China Masters (Draw): Dates: 1–6 September; Host: Shenzhen, China; Venue: Shenzhen Arena; Level: Super 750; Prize: $1,250,000; Format: 32MS/32WS/32MD/32WD/32XD | Score: 21–18, 21–18 | |
| 31 August | China Masters (Draw): Dates: 1–6 September; Host: Shenzhen, China; Venue: Shenzhen Arena; Level: Super 750; Prize: $1,250,000; Format: 32MS/32WS/32MD/32WD/32XD | (China) Feng Yanzhe (China) Huang Dongping | (Malaysia) Hoo Pang Ron (Malaysia) Lai Pei Jing |
| 31 August | China Masters (Draw): Dates: 1–6 September; Host: Shenzhen, China; Venue: Shenzhen Arena; Level: Super 750; Prize: $1,250,000; Format: 32MS/32WS/32MD/32WD/32XD | Score: 21–19, 21–16 | |
| 31 August | Indonesia Masters Super 100 I (Draw): Dates: 1–6 September; Host: Pontianak, Indonesia; Venue: GOR Terpadu Ahmad Yani; Level: Super 100; Prize: $120,000; Format: 64MS/32WS/32MD/32WD/32XD | (Chinese Taipei) Wang Po-wei | (China) Sun Chao |
| 31 August | Indonesia Masters Super 100 I (Draw): Dates: 1–6 September; Host: Pontianak, Indonesia; Venue: GOR Terpadu Ahmad Yani; Level: Super 100; Prize: $120,000; Format: 64MS/32WS/32MD/32WD/32XD | Score: 21–13, 21–19 | |
| 31 August | Indonesia Masters Super 100 I (Draw): Dates: 1–6 September; Host: Pontianak, Indonesia; Venue: GOR Terpadu Ahmad Yani; Level: Super 100; Prize: $120,000; Format: 64MS/32WS/32MD/32WD/32XD | (China) Xu Wenjing | (India) Mansi Singh |
| 31 August | Indonesia Masters Super 100 I (Draw): Dates: 1–6 September; Host: Pontianak, Indonesia; Venue: GOR Terpadu Ahmad Yani; Level: Super 100; Prize: $120,000; Format: 64MS/32WS/32MD/32WD/32XD | Score: 21–16, 21–8 | |
| 31 August | Indonesia Masters Super 100 I (Draw): Dates: 1–6 September; Host: Pontianak, Indonesia; Venue: GOR Terpadu Ahmad Yani; Level: Super 100; Prize: $120,000; Format: 64MS/32WS/32MD/32WD/32XD | (Chinese Taipei) Lin Chia-yen (Chinese Taipei) Lin Yong-sheng | (Indonesia) Yeremia Rambitan (Indonesia) Patra Harapan Rindorindo |
| 31 August | Indonesia Masters Super 100 I (Draw): Dates: 1–6 September; Host: Pontianak, Indonesia; Venue: GOR Terpadu Ahmad Yani; Level: Super 100; Prize: $120,000; Format: 64MS/32WS/32MD/32WD/32XD | Score: 11–21, 21–19, 22–20 | |
| 31 August | Indonesia Masters Super 100 I (Draw): Dates: 1–6 September; Host: Pontianak, Indonesia; Venue: GOR Terpadu Ahmad Yani; Level: Super 100; Prize: $120,000; Format: 64MS/32WS/32MD/32WD/32XD | (China) Liao Lixi (China) Shen Shiyao | (Chinese Taipei) Chou Yun-an (Chinese Taipei) Ko Ruo-hsuan |
| 31 August | Indonesia Masters Super 100 I (Draw): Dates: 1–6 September; Host: Pontianak, Indonesia; Venue: GOR Terpadu Ahmad Yani; Level: Super 100; Prize: $120,000; Format: 64MS/32WS/32MD/32WD/32XD | Score: 21–14, 21–15 | |
| 31 August | Indonesia Masters Super 100 I (Draw): Dates: 1–6 September; Host: Pontianak, Indonesia; Venue: GOR Terpadu Ahmad Yani; Level: Super 100; Prize: $120,000; Format: 64MS/32WS/32MD/32WD/32XD | (China) Ma Xixiang (China) Qin Huizhi | (China) Liao Pinyi (China) Zhang Jiahan |
| 31 August | Indonesia Masters Super 100 I (Draw): Dates: 1–6 September; Host: Pontianak, Indonesia; Venue: GOR Terpadu Ahmad Yani; Level: Super 100; Prize: $120,000; Format: 64MS/32WS/32MD/32WD/32XD | Score: 21–9, 20–22, 22–20 | |
| 31 August | Malaysia International: Dates: 1–6 September; Host: Perak, Malaysia; Venue: Arena Badminton Perak; Level: International Series; Prize: $10,000; Format: 64MS/32WS/32MD/32WD/32XD | (Malaysia) Danial Razeeq | (Malaysia) Muhammad Haziq |
| 31 August | Malaysia International: Dates: 1–6 September; Host: Perak, Malaysia; Venue: Arena Badminton Perak; Level: International Series; Prize: $10,000; Format: 64MS/32WS/32MD/32WD/32XD | Score: 17–21, 21–12, 22–20 | |
| 31 August | Malaysia International: Dates: 1–6 September; Host: Perak, Malaysia; Venue: Arena Badminton Perak; Level: International Series; Prize: $10,000; Format: 64MS/32WS/32MD/32WD/32XD | (Thailand) Anyapat Phichitpreechasak | (Indonesia) Mayla Cahya Afilian Pratiwi |
| 31 August | Malaysia International: Dates: 1–6 September; Host: Perak, Malaysia; Venue: Arena Badminton Perak; Level: International Series; Prize: $10,000; Format: 64MS/32WS/32MD/32WD/32XD | Score: 21–14, 21–16 | |
| 31 August | Malaysia International: Dates: 1–6 September; Host: Perak, Malaysia; Venue: Arena Badminton Perak; Level: International Series; Prize: $10,000; Format: 64MS/32WS/32MD/32WD/32XD | (Malaysia) Lau Yi Sheng (Malaysia) Lee Yi Bo | (Malaysia) Isyraf Hafizin (Malaysia) Ahmad Redzuan |
| 31 August | Malaysia International: Dates: 1–6 September; Host: Perak, Malaysia; Venue: Arena Badminton Perak; Level: International Series; Prize: $10,000; Format: 64MS/32WS/32MD/32WD/32XD | Score: 22–20, 22–20 | |
| 31 August | Malaysia International: Dates: 1–6 September; Host: Perak, Malaysia; Venue: Arena Badminton Perak; Level: International Series; Prize: $10,000; Format: 64MS/32WS/32MD/32WD/32XD | (Chinese Taipei) Hsieh Mi-yen (Chinese Taipei) Yu Chien-hui | (Thailand) Tidapron Kleebyeesun (Thailand) Nattamon Laisuan |
| 31 August | Malaysia International: Dates: 1–6 September; Host: Perak, Malaysia; Venue: Arena Badminton Perak; Level: International Series; Prize: $10,000; Format: 64MS/32WS/32MD/32WD/32XD | Score: 21–8, 21–14 | |
| 31 August | Malaysia International: Dates: 1–6 September; Host: Perak, Malaysia; Venue: Arena Badminton Perak; Level: International Series; Prize: $10,000; Format: 64MS/32WS/32MD/32WD/32XD | (Malaysia) Irfan Shazmir (Malaysia) Genevie Lim | (Malaysia) Lau Yi Sheng (Malaysia) Yap Rui Chen |
| 31 August | Malaysia International: Dates: 1–6 September; Host: Perak, Malaysia; Venue: Arena Badminton Perak; Level: International Series; Prize: $10,000; Format: 64MS/32WS/32MD/32WD/32XD | Score: 21–18, 21–15 | |
| 31 August | Guatemala Future Series: Dates: 2–6 September; Host: Guatemala City, Guatemala; Venue: Coliseo Deportivo; Level: Future Series; Format: 32MS/32WS/32MD/8WD/16XD | (Japan) Shunki Hagiwara | (Japan) Akio Yamaguchi |
| 31 August | Guatemala Future Series: Dates: 2–6 September; Host: Guatemala City, Guatemala; Venue: Coliseo Deportivo; Level: Future Series; Format: 32MS/32WS/32MD/8WD/16XD | Score: 21–14, 21–15 | |
| 31 August | Guatemala Future Series: Dates: 2–6 September; Host: Guatemala City, Guatemala; Venue: Coliseo Deportivo; Level: Future Series; Format: 32MS/32WS/32MD/8WD/16XD | (Japan) Meisa Anami | (Japan) Yuzuno Watanabe |
| 31 August | Guatemala Future Series: Dates: 2–6 September; Host: Guatemala City, Guatemala; Venue: Coliseo Deportivo; Level: Future Series; Format: 32MS/32WS/32MD/8WD/16XD | Score: 21–16, 21–14 | |
| 31 August | Guatemala Future Series: Dates: 2–6 September; Host: Guatemala City, Guatemala; Venue: Coliseo Deportivo; Level: Future Series; Format: 32MS/32WS/32MD/8WD/16XD | (Japan) Mahiro Oku (Japan) Masato Yamashiro | (Japan) Shunki Hagiwara (Japan) Mahiro Matsumoto |
| 31 August | Guatemala Future Series: Dates: 2–6 September; Host: Guatemala City, Guatemala; Venue: Coliseo Deportivo; Level: Future Series; Format: 32MS/32WS/32MD/8WD/16XD | Score: 23–21, 22–20 | |
| 31 August | Guatemala Future Series: Dates: 2–6 September; Host: Guatemala City, Guatemala; Venue: Coliseo Deportivo; Level: Future Series; Format: 32MS/32WS/32MD/8WD/16XD | (Japan) Aoi Banno (Japan) Yuzu Ueno | (Japan) Meisa Anami (Japan) Ria Haga |
| 31 August | Guatemala Future Series: Dates: 2–6 September; Host: Guatemala City, Guatemala; Venue: Coliseo Deportivo; Level: Future Series; Format: 32MS/32WS/32MD/8WD/16XD | Score: 23–21, 16–21, 25–23 | |
| 31 August | Guatemala Future Series: Dates: 2–6 September; Host: Guatemala City, Guatemala; Venue: Coliseo Deportivo; Level: Future Series; Format: 32MS/32WS/32MD/8WD/16XD | (Japan) Mahiro Oku (Japan) Ria Haga | (Japan) Masato Yamashiro (Japan) Meisa Anami |
| 31 August | Guatemala Future Series: Dates: 2–6 September; Host: Guatemala City, Guatemala; Venue: Coliseo Deportivo; Level: Future Series; Format: 32MS/32WS/32MD/8WD/16XD | Score: 21–18, 21–13 | |
| 31 August | Cameroon International: Dates: 3–6 September; Host: Yaoundé, Cameroon; Venue: Yaoundé Multipurpose Sports Complex; Level: International Challenge; Prize: $20,000; Format: 32MS/32WS/16MD/16WD/16XD | (India) Hmar Lalthazuala | (India) Tankara Gnana Dattu Talasila |
| 31 August | Cameroon International: Dates: 3–6 September; Host: Yaoundé, Cameroon; Venue: Yaoundé Multipurpose Sports Complex; Level: International Challenge; Prize: $20,000; Format: 32MS/32WS/16MD/16WD/16XD | Score: 21–13, 12–21, 23–21 | |
| 31 August | Cameroon International: Dates: 3–6 September; Host: Yaoundé, Cameroon; Venue: Yaoundé Multipurpose Sports Complex; Level: International Challenge; Prize: $20,000; Format: 32MS/32WS/16MD/16WD/16XD | (Azerbaijan) Keisha Fatimah Azzahra | (United Arab Emirates) Prakriti Bharath |
| 31 August | Cameroon International: Dates: 3–6 September; Host: Yaoundé, Cameroon; Venue: Yaoundé Multipurpose Sports Complex; Level: International Challenge; Prize: $20,000; Format: 32MS/32WS/16MD/16WD/16XD | Score: 21–16, 21–19 | |
| 31 August | Cameroon International: Dates: 3–6 September; Host: Yaoundé, Cameroon; Venue: Yaoundé Multipurpose Sports Complex; Level: International Challenge; Prize: $20,000; Format: 32MS/32WS/16MD/16WD/16XD | (Thailand) Thanawin Madee (Thailand) Pongsakorn Thongkham | (India) Sai Pratheek K. (India) Ruban Kumar |
| 31 August | Cameroon International: Dates: 3–6 September; Host: Yaoundé, Cameroon; Venue: Yaoundé Multipurpose Sports Complex; Level: International Challenge; Prize: $20,000; Format: 32MS/32WS/16MD/16WD/16XD | Score: 21–19, 15–21, 21–16 | |
| 31 August | Cameroon International: Dates: 3–6 September; Host: Yaoundé, Cameroon; Venue: Yaoundé Multipurpose Sports Complex; Level: International Challenge; Prize: $20,000; Format: 32MS/32WS/16MD/16WD/16XD | (India) Kavipriya Selvam (India) Simran Singhi | (India) Rutaparna Panda (India) Swetaparna Panda |
| 31 August | Cameroon International: Dates: 3–6 September; Host: Yaoundé, Cameroon; Venue: Yaoundé Multipurpose Sports Complex; Level: International Challenge; Prize: $20,000; Format: 32MS/32WS/16MD/16WD/16XD | Score: 21–10, 21–16 | |
| 31 August | Cameroon International: Dates: 3–6 September; Host: Yaoundé, Cameroon; Venue: Yaoundé Multipurpose Sports Complex; Level: International Challenge; Prize: $20,000; Format: 32MS/32WS/16MD/16WD/16XD | (India) Dhruv Rawat (India) K. Maneesha | (Algeria) Koceila Mammeri (Algeria) Tanina Mammeri |
| 31 August | Cameroon International: Dates: 3–6 September; Host: Yaoundé, Cameroon; Venue: Yaoundé Multipurpose Sports Complex; Level: International Challenge; Prize: $20,000; Format: 32MS/32WS/16MD/16WD/16XD | Score: 23–21, 21–17 | |
| 7 September | Vietnam Open (Draw): Dates: 8–13 September; Host: Ho Chi Minh City, Vietnam; Venue: Nguyen Du Stadium; Level: Super 100; Prize: $120,000; Format: 64MS/32WS/32MD/32WD/32XD | (Malaysia) Aidil Sholeh | (Singapore) Jason Teh |
| 7 September | Vietnam Open (Draw): Dates: 8–13 September; Host: Ho Chi Minh City, Vietnam; Venue: Nguyen Du Stadium; Level: Super 100; Prize: $120,000; Format: 64MS/32WS/32MD/32WD/32XD | Score: 21–16, 21–14 | |
| 7 September | Vietnam Open (Draw): Dates: 8–13 September; Host: Ho Chi Minh City, Vietnam; Venue: Nguyen Du Stadium; Level: Super 100; Prize: $120,000; Format: 64MS/32WS/32MD/32WD/32XD | (Thailand) Sarunrak Vitidsarn | (India) Isharani Baruah |
| 7 September | Vietnam Open (Draw): Dates: 8–13 September; Host: Ho Chi Minh City, Vietnam; Venue: Nguyen Du Stadium; Level: Super 100; Prize: $120,000; Format: 64MS/32WS/32MD/32WD/32XD | Score: 21–8, 21–15 | |
| 7 September | Vietnam Open (Draw): Dates: 8–13 September; Host: Ho Chi Minh City, Vietnam; Venue: Nguyen Du Stadium; Level: Super 100; Prize: $120,000; Format: 64MS/32WS/32MD/32WD/32XD | (Chinese Taipei) Chen Zhi-ray (Chinese Taipei) Lin Yu-chieh | (Singapore) Terry Hee (Singapore) Howin Wong |
| 7 September | Vietnam Open (Draw): Dates: 8–13 September; Host: Ho Chi Minh City, Vietnam; Venue: Nguyen Du Stadium; Level: Super 100; Prize: $120,000; Format: 64MS/32WS/32MD/32WD/32XD | Score: 21–14, 21–12 | |
| 7 September | Vietnam Open (Draw): Dates: 8–13 September; Host: Ho Chi Minh City, Vietnam; Venue: Nguyen Du Stadium; Level: Super 100; Prize: $120,000; Format: 64MS/32WS/32MD/32WD/32XD | (South Korea) Kim Yu-jung (South Korea) Lee Yu-lim | (China) Liu Jiayue (China) Wang Zimeng |
| 7 September | Vietnam Open (Draw): Dates: 8–13 September; Host: Ho Chi Minh City, Vietnam; Venue: Nguyen Du Stadium; Level: Super 100; Prize: $120,000; Format: 64MS/32WS/32MD/32WD/32XD | Score: 21–17, 10–21, 21–14 | |
| 7 September | Vietnam Open (Draw): Dates: 8–13 September; Host: Ho Chi Minh City, Vietnam; Venue: Nguyen Du Stadium; Level: Super 100; Prize: $120,000; Format: 64MS/32WS/32MD/32WD/32XD | (China) Ma Xixiang (China) Qin Huizhi | (Thailand) Phuwanat Horbanluekit (Thailand) Fungfa Korpthammakit |
| 7 September | Vietnam Open (Draw): Dates: 8–13 September; Host: Ho Chi Minh City, Vietnam; Venue: Nguyen Du Stadium; Level: Super 100; Prize: $120,000; Format: 64MS/32WS/32MD/32WD/32XD | Score: 20–22, 21–18, 21–19 | |
| 7 September | Costa Rica Future Series: Dates: 8–13 September; Host: San José, Costa Rica; Venue: BN Arena; Level: Future Series; Format: 64MS/32WS/32MD/16WD/32XD | (United States) Jay Chun | (United States) Jacob Zhang |
| 7 September | Costa Rica Future Series: Dates: 8–13 September; Host: San José, Costa Rica; Venue: BN Arena; Level: Future Series; Format: 64MS/32WS/32MD/16WD/32XD | Score: 20–22, 21–17, 21–13 | |
| 7 September | Costa Rica Future Series: Dates: 8–13 September; Host: San José, Costa Rica; Venue: BN Arena; Level: Future Series; Format: 64MS/32WS/32MD/16WD/32XD | (Colombia) Juliana Giraldo | (Guatemala) Nikté Sotomayor |
| 7 September | Costa Rica Future Series: Dates: 8–13 September; Host: San José, Costa Rica; Venue: BN Arena; Level: Future Series; Format: 64MS/32WS/32MD/16WD/32XD | Score: 21–15, 21–16 | |
| 7 September | Costa Rica Future Series: Dates: 8–13 September; Host: San José, Costa Rica; Venue: BN Arena; Level: Future Series; Format: 64MS/32WS/32MD/16WD/32XD | (Chinese Taipei) Chen Hui-heng (Chinese Taipei) Tseng Sheng-an | (United States) Jay Chun (United States) Jacob Zhang |
| 7 September | Costa Rica Future Series: Dates: 8–13 September; Host: San José, Costa Rica; Venue: BN Arena; Level: Future Series; Format: 64MS/32WS/32MD/16WD/32XD | Score: 26–24, 21–17 | |
| 7 September | Costa Rica Future Series: Dates: 8–13 September; Host: San José, Costa Rica; Venue: BN Arena; Level: Future Series; Format: 64MS/32WS/32MD/16WD/32XD | (Peru) Ariana Munar (Peru) Fernanda Munar | (Costa Rica) Cristal Villarreal Zapata (Costa Rica) Valentina Villarreal Zapata |
| 7 September | Costa Rica Future Series: Dates: 8–13 September; Host: San José, Costa Rica; Venue: BN Arena; Level: Future Series; Format: 64MS/32WS/32MD/16WD/32XD | Score: 21–9, 21–7 | |
| 7 September | Costa Rica Future Series: Dates: 8–13 September; Host: San José, Costa Rica; Venue: BN Arena; Level: Future Series; Format: 64MS/32WS/32MD/16WD/32XD | (Colombia) Jeronimo Giraldo (Colombia) Juliana Giraldo | (Costa Rica) Jose Fabricio Cambronero (Costa Rica) Valentina Villarreal Zapata |
| 7 September | Costa Rica Future Series: Dates: 8–13 September; Host: San José, Costa Rica; Venue: BN Arena; Level: Future Series; Format: 64MS/32WS/32MD/16WD/32XD | Score: 21–6, 21–14 | |
| 7 September | Belgian International: Dates: 9–12 September; Host: Nieuwpoort, Belgium; Venue: Sportzaal Sportarena; Level: International Challenge; Prize: $20,000; Format: 32MS/32WS/32MD/32WD/32XD | (Denmark) Karan Rajan | (Finland) Joakim Oldorff |
| 7 September | Belgian International: Dates: 9–12 September; Host: Nieuwpoort, Belgium; Venue: Sportzaal Sportarena; Level: International Challenge; Prize: $20,000; Format: 32MS/32WS/32MD/32WD/32XD | Score: 21–15, 16–21, 22–20 | |
| 7 September | Belgian International: Dates: 9–12 September; Host: Nieuwpoort, Belgium; Venue: Sportzaal Sportarena; Level: International Challenge; Prize: $20,000; Format: 32MS/32WS/32MD/32WD/32XD | (Scotland) Kirsty Gilmour | (Canada) Wen Yu Zhang |
| 7 September | Belgian International: Dates: 9–12 September; Host: Nieuwpoort, Belgium; Venue: Sportzaal Sportarena; Level: International Challenge; Prize: $20,000; Format: 32MS/32WS/32MD/32WD/32XD | Score: 21–16, 21–15 | |
| 7 September | Belgian International: Dates: 9–12 September; Host: Nieuwpoort, Belgium; Venue: Sportzaal Sportarena; Level: International Challenge; Prize: $20,000; Format: 32MS/32WS/32MD/32WD/32XD | (Scotland) Christopher Grimley (Scotland) Matthew Grimley | (Denmark) Robert Nebel (Denmark) Jeppe Søby |
| 7 September | Belgian International: Dates: 9–12 September; Host: Nieuwpoort, Belgium; Venue: Sportzaal Sportarena; Level: International Challenge; Prize: $20,000; Format: 32MS/32WS/32MD/32WD/32XD | Score: 21–18, 21–12 | |
| 7 September | Belgian International: Dates: 9–12 September; Host: Nieuwpoort, Belgium; Venue: Sportzaal Sportarena; Level: International Challenge; Prize: $20,000; Format: 32MS/32WS/32MD/32WD/32XD | (Denmark) Amalie Cecilie Kudsk (Denmark) Simona Pilgaard | (Chinese Taipei) Chen Hsin-tung (Chinese Taipei) Chen Yu-hsi |
| 7 September | Belgian International: Dates: 9–12 September; Host: Nieuwpoort, Belgium; Venue: Sportzaal Sportarena; Level: International Challenge; Prize: $20,000; Format: 32MS/32WS/32MD/32WD/32XD | Score: 21–16, 21–19 | |
| 7 September | Belgian International: Dates: 9–12 September; Host: Nieuwpoort, Belgium; Venue: Sportzaal Sportarena; Level: International Challenge; Prize: $20,000; Format: 32MS/32WS/32MD/32WD/32XD | (Denmark) Jeppe Søby (Denmark) Sofie Røjkjær | (France) Natan Begga (France) Elsa Jacob |
| 7 September | Belgian International: Dates: 9–12 September; Host: Nieuwpoort, Belgium; Venue: Sportzaal Sportarena; Level: International Challenge; Prize: $20,000; Format: 32MS/32WS/32MD/32WD/32XD | Score: 21–18, 21–13 | |
| 7 September | Lithuanian International: Dates: 10–13 September; Host: Kaunas, Lithuania; Venue: Kaunas Sports Hall; Level: Future Series; Format: 32MS/32WS/32MD/32WD/32XD | (South Korea) Choi Pyeong-gang | (South Korea) Ahn Sang-uk |
| 7 September | Lithuanian International: Dates: 10–13 September; Host: Kaunas, Lithuania; Venue: Kaunas Sports Hall; Level: Future Series; Format: 32MS/32WS/32MD/32WD/32XD | Score: 21–17, 21–17 | |
| 7 September | Lithuanian International: Dates: 10–13 September; Host: Kaunas, Lithuania; Venue: Kaunas Sports Hall; Level: Future Series; Format: 32MS/32WS/32MD/32WD/32XD | (France) Léonice Huet | (Croatia) Jelena Buchberger |
| 7 September | Lithuanian International: Dates: 10–13 September; Host: Kaunas, Lithuania; Venue: Kaunas Sports Hall; Level: Future Series; Format: 32MS/32WS/32MD/32WD/32XD | Score: 21–15, 21–10 | |
| 7 September | Lithuanian International: Dates: 10–13 September; Host: Kaunas, Lithuania; Venue: Kaunas Sports Hall; Level: Future Series; Format: 32MS/32WS/32MD/32WD/32XD | (Finland) Ananda Galvani Daniswara (Indonesia) Alan Muhammad Afwanil Hakim | (Norway) Torjus Flaaten (Norway) Jonas Østhassel |
| 7 September | Lithuanian International: Dates: 10–13 September; Host: Kaunas, Lithuania; Venue: Kaunas Sports Hall; Level: Future Series; Format: 32MS/32WS/32MD/32WD/32XD | Score: 21–15, 21–15 | |
| 7 September | Lithuanian International: Dates: 10–13 September; Host: Kaunas, Lithuania; Venue: Kaunas Sports Hall; Level: Future Series; Format: 32MS/32WS/32MD/32WD/32XD | (Ukraine) Maria Koriagina (Ukraine) Yaroslava Vantsarovska | (Poland) Julia Piwowar (Poland) Daria Zimnol |
| 7 September | Lithuanian International: Dates: 10–13 September; Host: Kaunas, Lithuania; Venue: Kaunas Sports Hall; Level: Future Series; Format: 32MS/32WS/32MD/32WD/32XD | Score: 21–16, 21–15 | |
| 7 September | Lithuanian International: Dates: 10–13 September; Host: Kaunas, Lithuania; Venue: Kaunas Sports Hall; Level: Future Series; Format: 32MS/32WS/32MD/32WD/32XD | (Austria) Ilija Nicolussi (Austria) Lena Rumpold | (Sweden) Oscar Reuterhäll (Sweden) Nathalie Wang |
| 7 September | Lithuanian International: Dates: 10–13 September; Host: Kaunas, Lithuania; Venue: Kaunas Sports Hall; Level: Future Series; Format: 32MS/32WS/32MD/32WD/32XD | Score: 21–10, 21–16 | |
| 14 September | Nakhon Sawan International: Dates: 15–20 September; Host: Nakhon Sawan, Thailand; Venue: Nakhon Sawan Provincial Stadium; Level: International Series; Prize: $10,000; Format: 128MS/128WS/64MD/32WD/64XD | (Japan) Koya Iwano | (Malaysia) Samuel Lee |
| 14 September | Nakhon Sawan International: Dates: 15–20 September; Host: Nakhon Sawan, Thailand; Venue: Nakhon Sawan Provincial Stadium; Level: International Series; Prize: $10,000; Format: 128MS/128WS/64MD/32WD/64XD | Score: 13–21, 21–12, 21–10 | |
| 14 September | Nakhon Sawan International: Dates: 15–20 September; Host: Nakhon Sawan, Thailand; Venue: Nakhon Sawan Provincial Stadium; Level: International Series; Prize: $10,000; Format: 128MS/128WS/64MD/32WD/64XD | (Chinese Taipei) Su Xiao-ting | (Japan) Saki Matsumoto |
| 14 September | Nakhon Sawan International: Dates: 15–20 September; Host: Nakhon Sawan, Thailand; Venue: Nakhon Sawan Provincial Stadium; Level: International Series; Prize: $10,000; Format: 128MS/128WS/64MD/32WD/64XD | Score: 14–21, 22–20, 21–16 | |
| 14 September | Nakhon Sawan International: Dates: 15–20 September; Host: Nakhon Sawan, Thailand; Venue: Nakhon Sawan Provincial Stadium; Level: International Series; Prize: $10,000; Format: 128MS/128WS/64MD/32WD/64XD | (Thailand) Thanawin Madee (Thailand) Pongsakorn Thongkham | (Japan) Seiya Inoue (Japan) Yuto Kida |
| 14 September | Nakhon Sawan International: Dates: 15–20 September; Host: Nakhon Sawan, Thailand; Venue: Nakhon Sawan Provincial Stadium; Level: International Series; Prize: $10,000; Format: 128MS/128WS/64MD/32WD/64XD | Score: 13–21, 21–15, 21–14 | |
| 14 September | Nakhon Sawan International: Dates: 15–20 September; Host: Nakhon Sawan, Thailand; Venue: Nakhon Sawan Provincial Stadium; Level: International Series; Prize: $10,000; Format: 128MS/128WS/64MD/32WD/64XD | (South Korea) Jang Min-yoon (South Korea) Kim Bo-min | (Thailand) Kodchaporn Chaichana (Thailand) Pannawee Polyiam |
| 14 September | Nakhon Sawan International: Dates: 15–20 September; Host: Nakhon Sawan, Thailand; Venue: Nakhon Sawan Provincial Stadium; Level: International Series; Prize: $10,000; Format: 128MS/128WS/64MD/32WD/64XD | Score: 22–24, 21–6, 21–12 | |
| 14 September | Nakhon Sawan International: Dates: 15–20 September; Host: Nakhon Sawan, Thailand; Venue: Nakhon Sawan Provincial Stadium; Level: International Series; Prize: $10,000; Format: 128MS/128WS/64MD/32WD/64XD | (Thailand) Ratchapol Makkasasithorn (Thailand) Patida Srisawat | (Thailand) Adisak Prasertphetmanee (Thailand) Pannawee Polyiam |
| 14 September | Nakhon Sawan International: Dates: 15–20 September; Host: Nakhon Sawan, Thailand; Venue: Nakhon Sawan Provincial Stadium; Level: International Series; Prize: $10,000; Format: 128MS/128WS/64MD/32WD/64XD | Score: 21–17, 21–16 | |
| 14 September | Polish International: Dates: 16–20 September; Host: Kraków, Poland; Venue: Sport Hall of AGH University of Kraków; Level: International Series; Prize: $10,000; Format: 32MS/32WS/32MD/32WD/32XD | (South Korea) Choi Pyeong-gang | (Italy) Giovanni Toti |
| 14 September | Polish International: Dates: 16–20 September; Host: Kraków, Poland; Venue: Sport Hall of AGH University of Kraków; Level: International Series; Prize: $10,000; Format: 32MS/32WS/32MD/32WD/32XD | Score: 21–19, 21–10 | |
| 14 September | Polish International: Dates: 16–20 September; Host: Kraków, Poland; Venue: Sport Hall of AGH University of Kraków; Level: International Series; Prize: $10,000; Format: 32MS/32WS/32MD/32WD/32XD | (Republic of Ireland) Sophia Noble | (Chinese Taipei) Chiang Pin-hsuan |
| 14 September | Polish International: Dates: 16–20 September; Host: Kraków, Poland; Venue: Sport Hall of AGH University of Kraków; Level: International Series; Prize: $10,000; Format: 32MS/32WS/32MD/32WD/32XD | Score: 21–15, 21–7 | |
| 14 September | Polish International: Dates: 16–20 September; Host: Kraków, Poland; Venue: Sport Hall of AGH University of Kraków; Level: International Series; Prize: $10,000; Format: 32MS/32WS/32MD/32WD/32XD | (Spain) Jacobo Fernández (Spain) Alberto Perals | (Netherlands) Andy Buijk (Netherlands) Brian Wassink |
| 14 September | Polish International: Dates: 16–20 September; Host: Kraków, Poland; Venue: Sport Hall of AGH University of Kraków; Level: International Series; Prize: $10,000; Format: 32MS/32WS/32MD/32WD/32XD | Score: 21–13, 21–16 | |
| 14 September | Polish International: Dates: 16–20 September; Host: Kraków, Poland; Venue: Sport Hall of AGH University of Kraków; Level: International Series; Prize: $10,000; Format: 32MS/32WS/32MD/32WD/32XD | (Chinese Taipei) Chen Hsin-tung (Chinese Taipei) Chen Yu-hsi | (Netherlands) Kirsten de Wit (Netherlands) Meerte Loos |
| 14 September | Polish International: Dates: 16–20 September; Host: Kraków, Poland; Venue: Sport Hall of AGH University of Kraków; Level: International Series; Prize: $10,000; Format: 32MS/32WS/32MD/32WD/32XD | Score: 21–13, 21–16 | |
| 14 September | Polish International: Dates: 16–20 September; Host: Kraków, Poland; Venue: Sport Hall of AGH University of Kraków; Level: International Series; Prize: $10,000; Format: 32MS/32WS/32MD/32WD/32XD | (Netherlands) Andy Buijk (Netherlands) Meerte Loos | (Sweden) Max Svensson (Sweden) Sofia Strömvall |
| 14 September | Polish International: Dates: 16–20 September; Host: Kraków, Poland; Venue: Sport Hall of AGH University of Kraków; Level: International Series; Prize: $10,000; Format: 32MS/32WS/32MD/32WD/32XD | Score: 21–16, 21–11 | |
| 14 September | La Perla del Otun (cancelled): Dates: 16–20 September; Host: Pereira, Colombia; Venue: Coliseo Menor; Level: Future Series; Format: 32MS/32WS/32MD/16WD/32XD | | |
| 14 September | La Perla del Otun (cancelled): Dates: 16–20 September; Host: Pereira, Colombia; Venue: Coliseo Menor; Level: Future Series; Format: 32MS/32WS/32MD/16WD/32XD | Score: | |
| 14 September | La Perla del Otun (cancelled): Dates: 16–20 September; Host: Pereira, Colombia; Venue: Coliseo Menor; Level: Future Series; Format: 32MS/32WS/32MD/16WD/32XD | Score: | |
| 14 September | La Perla del Otun (cancelled): Dates: 16–20 September; Host: Pereira, Colombia; Venue: Coliseo Menor; Level: Future Series; Format: 32MS/32WS/32MD/16WD/32XD | Score: | |
| 14 September | La Perla del Otun (cancelled): Dates: 16–20 September; Host: Pereira, Colombia; Venue: Coliseo Menor; Level: Future Series; Format: 32MS/32WS/32MD/16WD/32XD | Score: | |
| 14 September | La Perla del Otun (cancelled): Dates: 16–20 September; Host: Pereira, Colombia; Venue: Coliseo Menor; Level: Future Series; Format: 32MS/32WS/32MD/16WD/32XD | Score: | |
| 14 September | Senegal International: Dates: 17–20 September; Host: Thiès, Senegal; Venue: Lat Dior Stadium; Level: International Series; Prize: $10,000; Format: 32MS/16WS/8MD/2WD/8XD | (Iran) Ali Hayati | (India) Shashwat Dalal |
| 14 September | Senegal International: Dates: 17–20 September; Host: Thiès, Senegal; Venue: Lat Dior Stadium; Level: International Series; Prize: $10,000; Format: 32MS/16WS/8MD/2WD/8XD | Score: 9–21, 21–19, 21–12 | |
| 14 September | Senegal International: Dates: 17–20 September; Host: Thiès, Senegal; Venue: Lat Dior Stadium; Level: International Series; Prize: $10,000; Format: 32MS/16WS/8MD/2WD/8XD | (Czech Republic) Tereza Švábíková | (Switzerland) Jenjira Stadelmann |
| 14 September | Senegal International: Dates: 17–20 September; Host: Thiès, Senegal; Venue: Lat Dior Stadium; Level: International Series; Prize: $10,000; Format: 32MS/16WS/8MD/2WD/8XD | Score: 21–13, 11–21, 21–8 | |
| 14 September | Senegal International: Dates: 17–20 September; Host: Thiès, Senegal; Venue: Lat Dior Stadium; Level: International Series; Prize: $10,000; Format: 32MS/16WS/8MD/2WD/8XD | (Ukraine) Vladyslav Kunin (Ukraine) Yegor Romaniuk | (Belgium) Iljo van Delsen (Belgium) Yaro van Delsen |
| 14 September | Senegal International: Dates: 17–20 September; Host: Thiès, Senegal; Venue: Lat Dior Stadium; Level: International Series; Prize: $10,000; Format: 32MS/16WS/8MD/2WD/8XD | Score: 23–21, 21–19 | |
| 14 September | Senegal International: Dates: 17–20 September; Host: Thiès, Senegal; Venue: Lat Dior Stadium; Level: International Series; Prize: $10,000; Format: 32MS/16WS/8MD/2WD/8XD | (Senegal) Maryame Cisse (Senegal) Yandé Sene | (Senegal) Aissatou Faye (Senegal) Fatou Ngom |
| 14 September | Senegal International: Dates: 17–20 September; Host: Thiès, Senegal; Venue: Lat Dior Stadium; Level: International Series; Prize: $10,000; Format: 32MS/16WS/8MD/2WD/8XD | Score: 21–7, 21–17 | |
| 14 September | Senegal International: Dates: 17–20 September; Host: Thiès, Senegal; Venue: Lat Dior Stadium; Level: International Series; Prize: $10,000; Format: 32MS/16WS/8MD/2WD/8XD | (Ukraine) Yegor Romaniuk (Poland) Kaja Ziółkowska | (Egypt) Adham Hatem Elgamal (Egypt) Doha Hany |
| 14 September | Senegal International: Dates: 17–20 September; Host: Thiès, Senegal; Venue: Lat Dior Stadium; Level: International Series; Prize: $10,000; Format: 32MS/16WS/8MD/2WD/8XD | Score: 21–14, 21–16 | |
| 14 September | 2026 Asian Games (Draw): Dates: 20–24 September; Host: Ichinomiya, Japan; Venue: Ichinomiya City Gymnasium; Level: Multi-Sport Games; Format: 13 MT/11 WT | Men's team | |
| 14 September | 2026 Asian Games (Draw): Dates: 20–24 September; Host: Ichinomiya, Japan; Venue: Ichinomiya City Gymnasium; Level: Multi-Sport Games; Format: 13 MT/11 WT | Indonesia | China |
| 14 September | 2026 Asian Games (Draw): Dates: 20–24 September; Host: Ichinomiya, Japan; Venue: Ichinomiya City Gymnasium; Level: Multi-Sport Games; Format: 13 MT/11 WT | Jonatan Christie | Shi Yuqi |
| 14 September | 2026 Asian Games (Draw): Dates: 20–24 September; Host: Ichinomiya, Japan; Venue: Ichinomiya City Gymnasium; Level: Multi-Sport Games; Format: 13 MT/11 WT | Fajar Alfian; Muhammad Shohibul Fikri | Liang Weikeng; Wang Chang |
| 14 September | 2026 Asian Games (Draw): Dates: 20–24 September; Host: Ichinomiya, Japan; Venue: Ichinomiya City Gymnasium; Level: Multi-Sport Games; Format: 13 MT/11 WT | Alwi Farhan | Li Shifeng |
| 14 September | 2026 Asian Games (Draw): Dates: 20–24 September; Host: Ichinomiya, Japan; Venue: Ichinomiya City Gymnasium; Level: Multi-Sport Games; Format: 13 MT/11 WT | Leo Rolly Carnando; Daniel Marthin | He Jiting; Liu Yi |
| 14 September | 2026 Asian Games (Draw): Dates: 20–24 September; Host: Ichinomiya, Japan; Venue: Ichinomiya City Gymnasium; Level: Multi-Sport Games; Format: 13 MT/11 WT | Zaki Ubaidillah | Weng Hongyang |
| 14 September | 2026 Asian Games (Draw): Dates: 20–24 September; Host: Ichinomiya, Japan; Venue: Ichinomiya City Gymnasium; Level: Multi-Sport Games; Format: 13 MT/11 WT | Score: 3–2 | |
| 14 September | 2026 Asian Games (Draw): Dates: 20–24 September; Host: Ichinomiya, Japan; Venue: Ichinomiya City Gymnasium; Level: Multi-Sport Games; Format: 13 MT/11 WT | Women's team | |
| 14 September | 2026 Asian Games (Draw): Dates: 20–24 September; Host: Ichinomiya, Japan; Venue: Ichinomiya City Gymnasium; Level: Multi-Sport Games; Format: 13 MT/11 WT | China | Japan |
| 14 September | 2026 Asian Games (Draw): Dates: 20–24 September; Host: Ichinomiya, Japan; Venue: Ichinomiya City Gymnasium; Level: Multi-Sport Games; Format: 13 MT/11 WT | Wang Zhiyi | Akane Yamaguchi |
| 14 September | 2026 Asian Games (Draw): Dates: 20–24 September; Host: Ichinomiya, Japan; Venue: Ichinomiya City Gymnasium; Level: Multi-Sport Games; Format: 13 MT/11 WT | Liu Shengshu; Tan Ning | Yuki Fukushima; Mayu Matsumoto |
| 14 September | 2026 Asian Games (Draw): Dates: 20–24 September; Host: Ichinomiya, Japan; Venue: Ichinomiya City Gymnasium; Level: Multi-Sport Games; Format: 13 MT/11 WT | Chen Yufei | Tomoka Miyazaki |
| 14 September | 2026 Asian Games (Draw): Dates: 20–24 September; Host: Ichinomiya, Japan; Venue: Ichinomiya City Gymnasium; Level: Multi-Sport Games; Format: 13 MT/11 WT | Jia Yifan; Zhang Shuxian | Rin Iwanaga; Kie Nakanishi |
| 14 September | 2026 Asian Games (Draw): Dates: 20–24 September; Host: Ichinomiya, Japan; Venue: Ichinomiya City Gymnasium; Level: Multi-Sport Games; Format: 13 MT/11 WT | Han Yue | Nozomi Okuhara |
| 14 September | 2026 Asian Games (Draw): Dates: 20–24 September; Host: Ichinomiya, Japan; Venue: Ichinomiya City Gymnasium; Level: Multi-Sport Games; Format: 13 MT/11 WT | Score: 3–0 | |
| 21 September | Indonesia International II: Dates: 22–27 September; Host: Surabaya, Indonesia; Venue: GOR Bulutangkis Soedirman; Level: International Challenge; Prize: $15,000; Format: 64MS/64WS/64MD/32WD/32XD | (Indonesia) Bismo Raya Oktora | (Indonesia) Chico Aura Dwi Wardoyo |
| 21 September | Indonesia International II: Dates: 22–27 September; Host: Surabaya, Indonesia; Venue: GOR Bulutangkis Soedirman; Level: International Challenge; Prize: $15,000; Format: 64MS/64WS/64MD/32WD/32XD | Score: 21–13, 10–21, 21–17 | |
| 21 September | Indonesia International II: Dates: 22–27 September; Host: Surabaya, Indonesia; Venue: GOR Bulutangkis Soedirman; Level: International Challenge; Prize: $15,000; Format: 64MS/64WS/64MD/32WD/32XD | (Japan) Sakura Masuki | (Indonesia) Dalila Aghnia Puteri |
| 21 September | Indonesia International II: Dates: 22–27 September; Host: Surabaya, Indonesia; Venue: GOR Bulutangkis Soedirman; Level: International Challenge; Prize: $15,000; Format: 64MS/64WS/64MD/32WD/32XD | Score: 21–13, 21–16 | |
| 21 September | Indonesia International II: Dates: 22–27 September; Host: Surabaya, Indonesia; Venue: GOR Bulutangkis Soedirman; Level: International Challenge; Prize: $15,000; Format: 64MS/64WS/64MD/32WD/32XD | (Indonesia) Taufik Aderya (Indonesia) Alexius Ongkytama Subagio | (Indonesia) Yeremia Rambitan (Indonesia) Patra Harapan Rindorindo |
| 21 September | Indonesia International II: Dates: 22–27 September; Host: Surabaya, Indonesia; Venue: GOR Bulutangkis Soedirman; Level: International Challenge; Prize: $15,000; Format: 64MS/64WS/64MD/32WD/32XD | Score: 21–9, 21–9 | |
| 21 September | Indonesia International II: Dates: 22–27 September; Host: Surabaya, Indonesia; Venue: GOR Bulutangkis Soedirman; Level: International Challenge; Prize: $15,000; Format: 64MS/64WS/64MD/32WD/32XD | (Japan) Mikoto Aiso (Japan) Momoha Niimi | (Malaysia) Cheng Su Hui (Malaysia) Chong Jie Yu |
| 21 September | Indonesia International II: Dates: 22–27 September; Host: Surabaya, Indonesia; Venue: GOR Bulutangkis Soedirman; Level: International Challenge; Prize: $15,000; Format: 64MS/64WS/64MD/32WD/32XD | Score: 21–15, 21–17 | |
| 21 September | Indonesia International II: Dates: 22–27 September; Host: Surabaya, Indonesia; Venue: GOR Bulutangkis Soedirman; Level: International Challenge; Prize: $15,000; Format: 64MS/64WS/64MD/32WD/32XD | (Indonesia) Rehan Naufal Kusharjanto (Indonesia) Melati Daeva Oktavianti | (Indonesia) Bagas Maulana (Indonesia) Apriyani Rahayu |
| 21 September | Indonesia International II: Dates: 22–27 September; Host: Surabaya, Indonesia; Venue: GOR Bulutangkis Soedirman; Level: International Challenge; Prize: $15,000; Format: 64MS/64WS/64MD/32WD/32XD | Score: 21–19, 21–15 | |
| 21 September | Venezuela International (cancelled): Dates: 22–26 September; Host: Caracas, Venezuela; Venue: TBC; Level: International Series; Prize: $5,000; Format: 32MS/32WS/32MD/16WD/32XD | | |
| 21 September | Venezuela International (cancelled): Dates: 22–26 September; Host: Caracas, Venezuela; Venue: TBC; Level: International Series; Prize: $5,000; Format: 32MS/32WS/32MD/16WD/32XD | Score: | |
| 21 September | Venezuela International (cancelled): Dates: 22–26 September; Host: Caracas, Venezuela; Venue: TBC; Level: International Series; Prize: $5,000; Format: 32MS/32WS/32MD/16WD/32XD | Score: | |
| 21 September | Venezuela International (cancelled): Dates: 22–26 September; Host: Caracas, Venezuela; Venue: TBC; Level: International Series; Prize: $5,000; Format: 32MS/32WS/32MD/16WD/32XD | Score: | |
| 21 September | Venezuela International (cancelled): Dates: 22–26 September; Host: Caracas, Venezuela; Venue: TBC; Level: International Series; Prize: $5,000; Format: 32MS/32WS/32MD/16WD/32XD | Score: | |
| 21 September | Venezuela International (cancelled): Dates: 22–26 September; Host: Caracas, Venezuela; Venue: TBC; Level: International Series; Prize: $5,000; Format: 32MS/32WS/32MD/16WD/32XD | Score: | |
| 21 September | Croatian International: Dates: 24–27 September; Host: Donja Stubica, Croatia; Venue: Sports hall Stubica; Level: Future Series; Format: 32MS/32WS/32MD/32WD/32XD | (France) Mady Sow | (Italy) Simone Piccinin |
| 21 September | Croatian International: Dates: 24–27 September; Host: Donja Stubica, Croatia; Venue: Sports hall Stubica; Level: Future Series; Format: 32MS/32WS/32MD/32WD/32XD | Score: 21–19, 11–21, 21–13 | |
| 21 September | Croatian International: Dates: 24–27 September; Host: Donja Stubica, Croatia; Venue: Sports hall Stubica; Level: Future Series; Format: 32MS/32WS/32MD/32WD/32XD | (India) Anwesha Gowda | (Bulgaria) Gergana Pavlova |
| 21 September | Croatian International: Dates: 24–27 September; Host: Donja Stubica, Croatia; Venue: Sports hall Stubica; Level: Future Series; Format: 32MS/32WS/32MD/32WD/32XD | Score: 21–14, 21–10 | |
| 21 September | Croatian International: Dates: 24–27 September; Host: Donja Stubica, Croatia; Venue: Sports hall Stubica; Level: Future Series; Format: 32MS/32WS/32MD/32WD/32XD | (Norway) Torjus Flaaten (Norway) Jonas Østhassel | (France) Timeo Bourgin (France) Orphé Queton-Bouissou |
| 21 September | Croatian International: Dates: 24–27 September; Host: Donja Stubica, Croatia; Venue: Sports hall Stubica; Level: Future Series; Format: 32MS/32WS/32MD/32WD/32XD | Score: 21–14, 18–21, 21–11 | |
| 21 September | Croatian International: Dates: 24–27 September; Host: Donja Stubica, Croatia; Venue: Sports hall Stubica; Level: Future Series; Format: 32MS/32WS/32MD/32WD/32XD | (France) Lily Gautier (France) Manon Heitzmann | (Austria) Sarah Dlapka (Austria) Lena Rumpold |
| 21 September | Croatian International: Dates: 24–27 September; Host: Donja Stubica, Croatia; Venue: Sports hall Stubica; Level: Future Series; Format: 32MS/32WS/32MD/32WD/32XD | Score: 21–17, 21–14 | |
| 21 September | Croatian International: Dates: 24–27 September; Host: Donja Stubica, Croatia; Venue: Sports hall Stubica; Level: Future Series; Format: 32MS/32WS/32MD/32WD/32XD | (Denmark) Alexander Pedersen (Austria) Serena Au Yeong | (France) Timeo Bourgin (France) Marjolene Raffin |
| 21 September | Croatian International: Dates: 24–27 September; Host: Donja Stubica, Croatia; Venue: Sports hall Stubica; Level: Future Series; Format: 32MS/32WS/32MD/32WD/32XD | Score: 21–19, 21–18 | |
| 21 September | Kampala International: Dates: 24–27 September; Host: Kampala, Uganda; Venue: Lugogo Stadium; Level: Future Series; Format: 32MS/32WS/32MD/16WD/32XD | (India) Abhishek Kanapala | (India) Tanmoy Bikash Boruah |
| 21 September | Kampala International: Dates: 24–27 September; Host: Kampala, Uganda; Venue: Lugogo Stadium; Level: Future Series; Format: 32MS/32WS/32MD/16WD/32XD | Score: 22–20, 21–11 | |
| 21 September | Kampala International: Dates: 24–27 September; Host: Kampala, Uganda; Venue: Lugogo Stadium; Level: Future Series; Format: 32MS/32WS/32MD/16WD/32XD | (India) Ishita Negi | (India) Akshita Manral |
| 21 September | Kampala International: Dates: 24–27 September; Host: Kampala, Uganda; Venue: Lugogo Stadium; Level: Future Series; Format: 32MS/32WS/32MD/16WD/32XD | Score: 21–10, 21–15 | |
| 21 September | Kampala International: Dates: 24–27 September; Host: Kampala, Uganda; Venue: Lugogo Stadium; Level: Future Series; Format: 32MS/32WS/32MD/16WD/32XD | (India) Abhyuday Choudhary (India) Ayush Makhija | (India) Manav Choudhary (India) Himanshu Tiwari |
| 21 September | Kampala International: Dates: 24–27 September; Host: Kampala, Uganda; Venue: Lugogo Stadium; Level: Future Series; Format: 32MS/32WS/32MD/16WD/32XD | Score: 21–8, 18–21, 23–21 | |
| 21 September | Kampala International: Dates: 24–27 September; Host: Kampala, Uganda; Venue: Lugogo Stadium; Level: Future Series; Format: 32MS/32WS/32MD/16WD/32XD | (India) Sonali Singh (India) Ritika Thaker | (India) Akshita Manral (India) Ishita Negi |
| 21 September | Kampala International: Dates: 24–27 September; Host: Kampala, Uganda; Venue: Lugogo Stadium; Level: Future Series; Format: 32MS/32WS/32MD/16WD/32XD | Score: 21–16, 21–17 | |
| 21 September | Kampala International: Dates: 24–27 September; Host: Kampala, Uganda; Venue: Lugogo Stadium; Level: Future Series; Format: 32MS/32WS/32MD/16WD/32XD | (Malaysia) Hafiz Hakimi Hashim (Malaysia) Lim Xuan | (Uganda) Muzafaru Lubega (Uganda) Gladys Mbabazi |
| 21 September | Kampala International: Dates: 24–27 September; Host: Kampala, Uganda; Venue: Lugogo Stadium; Level: Future Series; Format: 32MS/32WS/32MD/16WD/32XD | Score: 21–12, 21–13 | |
| 21 September | 2026 Asian Games (Draw): Dates: 25–29 September; Host: Ichinomiya, Japan; Venue: Ichinomiya City Gymnasium; Level: Multi-Sport Games; Format: 64MS/64WS/32MD/32WD/32XD | (Thailand) Kunlavut Vitidsarn | (Singapore) Loh Kean Yew |
| 21 September | 2026 Asian Games (Draw): Dates: 25–29 September; Host: Ichinomiya, Japan; Venue: Ichinomiya City Gymnasium; Level: Multi-Sport Games; Format: 64MS/64WS/32MD/32WD/32XD | Score: 21–12, 21–16 | |
| 21 September | 2026 Asian Games (Draw): Dates: 25–29 September; Host: Ichinomiya, Japan; Venue: Ichinomiya City Gymnasium; Level: Multi-Sport Games; Format: 64MS/64WS/32MD/32WD/32XD | (South Korea) An Se-young | (Japan) Akane Yamaguchi |
| 21 September | 2026 Asian Games (Draw): Dates: 25–29 September; Host: Ichinomiya, Japan; Venue: Ichinomiya City Gymnasium; Level: Multi-Sport Games; Format: 64MS/64WS/32MD/32WD/32XD | Score: 21–17, 21–9 | |
| 21 September | 2026 Asian Games (Draw): Dates: 25–29 September; Host: Ichinomiya, Japan; Venue: Ichinomiya City Gymnasium; Level: Multi-Sport Games; Format: 64MS/64WS/32MD/32WD/32XD | (Indonesia) Leo Rolly Carnando (Indonesia) Daniel Marthin | (China) Liang Weikeng (China) Wang Chang |
| 21 September | 2026 Asian Games (Draw): Dates: 25–29 September; Host: Ichinomiya, Japan; Venue: Ichinomiya City Gymnasium; Level: Multi-Sport Games; Format: 64MS/64WS/32MD/32WD/32XD | Score: 19–21, 21–13, 21–18 | |
| 21 September | 2026 Asian Games (Draw): Dates: 25–29 September; Host: Ichinomiya, Japan; Venue: Ichinomiya City Gymnasium; Level: Multi-Sport Games; Format: 64MS/64WS/32MD/32WD/32XD | (South Korea) Baek Ha-na (South Korea) Lee So-hee | (China) Liu Shengshu (China) Tan Ning |
| 21 September | 2026 Asian Games (Draw): Dates: 25–29 September; Host: Ichinomiya, Japan; Venue: Ichinomiya City Gymnasium; Level: Multi-Sport Games; Format: 64MS/64WS/32MD/32WD/32XD | Score: 26–28, 21–18, 21–18 | |
| 21 September | 2026 Asian Games (Draw): Dates: 25–29 September; Host: Ichinomiya, Japan; Venue: Ichinomiya City Gymnasium; Level: Multi-Sport Games; Format: 64MS/64WS/32MD/32WD/32XD | (China) Jiang Zhenbang (China) Wei Yaxin | (Indonesia) Amri Syahnawi (Indonesia) Nita Violina Marwah |
| 21 September | 2026 Asian Games (Draw): Dates: 25–29 September; Host: Ichinomiya, Japan; Venue: Ichinomiya City Gymnasium; Level: Multi-Sport Games; Format: 64MS/64WS/32MD/32WD/32XD | Score: 21–19, 21–8 | |
| 28 September | Abu Dhabi Masters (cancelled): Dates: 29 September – 4 October; Host: Dubai, United Arab Emirates; Venue: Nasser Khamis Al Marri; Level: Super 100; Prize: $120,000; Format: | | |
| 28 September | Abu Dhabi Masters (cancelled): Dates: 29 September – 4 October; Host: Dubai, United Arab Emirates; Venue: Nasser Khamis Al Marri; Level: Super 100; Prize: $120,000; Format: | Score: | |
| 28 September | Abu Dhabi Masters (cancelled): Dates: 29 September – 4 October; Host: Dubai, United Arab Emirates; Venue: Nasser Khamis Al Marri; Level: Super 100; Prize: $120,000; Format: | Score: | |
| 28 September | Abu Dhabi Masters (cancelled): Dates: 29 September – 4 October; Host: Dubai, United Arab Emirates; Venue: Nasser Khamis Al Marri; Level: Super 100; Prize: $120,000; Format: | Score: | |
| 28 September | Abu Dhabi Masters (cancelled): Dates: 29 September – 4 October; Host: Dubai, United Arab Emirates; Venue: Nasser Khamis Al Marri; Level: Super 100; Prize: $120,000; Format: | Score: | |
| 28 September | Abu Dhabi Masters (cancelled): Dates: 29 September – 4 October; Host: Dubai, United Arab Emirates; Venue: Nasser Khamis Al Marri; Level: Super 100; Prize: $120,000; Format: | Score: | |
| 28 September | Guatemala International: Dates: 29 September – 4 October; Host: Guatemala City, Guatemala; Venue: Federación Nacional de Bádminton; Level: International Challenge; Prize: $20,000; Format: 32MS/32WS/32MD/16WD/32XD | (Brazil) Jonathan Matias | (Italy) Giovanni Toti |
| 28 September | Guatemala International: Dates: 29 September – 4 October; Host: Guatemala City, Guatemala; Venue: Federación Nacional de Bádminton; Level: International Challenge; Prize: $20,000; Format: 32MS/32WS/32MD/16WD/32XD | Score: 19–21, 21–17, 21–12 | |
| 28 September | Guatemala International: Dates: 29 September – 4 October; Host: Guatemala City, Guatemala; Venue: Federación Nacional de Bádminton; Level: International Challenge; Prize: $20,000; Format: 32MS/32WS/32MD/16WD/32XD | (Brazil) Juliana Viana Vieira | (Chinese Taipei) Huang Ching-ping |
| 28 September | Guatemala International: Dates: 29 September – 4 October; Host: Guatemala City, Guatemala; Venue: Federación Nacional de Bádminton; Level: International Challenge; Prize: $20,000; Format: 32MS/32WS/32MD/16WD/32XD | Score: 21–16, 21–14 | |
| 28 September | Guatemala International: Dates: 29 September – 4 October; Host: Guatemala City, Guatemala; Venue: Federación Nacional de Bádminton; Level: International Challenge; Prize: $20,000; Format: 32MS/32WS/32MD/16WD/32XD | (Canada) Kevin Lee (Canada) Ty Alexander Lindeman | (Brazil) Fabrício Farias (Brazil) Davi Silva |
| 28 September | Guatemala International: Dates: 29 September – 4 October; Host: Guatemala City, Guatemala; Venue: Federación Nacional de Bádminton; Level: International Challenge; Prize: $20,000; Format: 32MS/32WS/32MD/16WD/32XD | Score: 21–12, 21–17 | |
| 28 September | Guatemala International: Dates: 29 September – 4 October; Host: Guatemala City, Guatemala; Venue: Federación Nacional de Bádminton; Level: International Challenge; Prize: $20,000; Format: 32MS/32WS/32MD/16WD/32XD | (Brazil) Sânia Lima (Brazil) Juliana Viana Vieira | (Japan) Mihane Endo (Japan) Natsumi Takasaki |
| 28 September | Guatemala International: Dates: 29 September – 4 October; Host: Guatemala City, Guatemala; Venue: Federación Nacional de Bádminton; Level: International Challenge; Prize: $20,000; Format: 32MS/32WS/32MD/16WD/32XD | Score: 21–17, 22–20 | |
| 28 September | Guatemala International: Dates: 29 September – 4 October; Host: Guatemala City, Guatemala; Venue: Federación Nacional de Bádminton; Level: International Challenge; Prize: $20,000; Format: 32MS/32WS/32MD/16WD/32XD | (Canada) Timothy Lock (Canada) Chloe Hoang | (Brazil) Davi Silva (Brazil) Sânia Lima |
| 28 September | Guatemala International: Dates: 29 September – 4 October; Host: Guatemala City, Guatemala; Venue: Federación Nacional de Bádminton; Level: International Challenge; Prize: $20,000; Format: 32MS/32WS/32MD/16WD/32XD | Score: 21–13, 8–21, 21–12 | |
| 28 September | Dutch Open: Dates: 30 September – 4 October; Host: 's-Hertogenbosch, Netherlands; Venue: Maaspoort; Level: International Challenge; Prize: $20,000; Format: 32MS/32WS/32MD/32WD/32XD | (Chinese Taipei) Su Li-yang | (Israel) Daniil Dubovenko |
| 28 September | Dutch Open: Dates: 30 September – 4 October; Host: 's-Hertogenbosch, Netherlands; Venue: Maaspoort; Level: International Challenge; Prize: $20,000; Format: 32MS/32WS/32MD/32WD/32XD | Score: 21–17, 16–21, 21–17 | |
| 28 September | Dutch Open: Dates: 30 September – 4 October; Host: 's-Hertogenbosch, Netherlands; Venue: Maaspoort; Level: International Challenge; Prize: $20,000; Format: 32MS/32WS/32MD/32WD/32XD | (Germany) Yvonne Li | (India) Aakarshi Kashyap |
| 28 September | Dutch Open: Dates: 30 September – 4 October; Host: 's-Hertogenbosch, Netherlands; Venue: Maaspoort; Level: International Challenge; Prize: $20,000; Format: 32MS/32WS/32MD/32WD/32XD | Score: 21–9, 21–6 | |
| 28 September | Dutch Open: Dates: 30 September – 4 October; Host: 's-Hertogenbosch, Netherlands; Venue: Maaspoort; Level: International Challenge; Prize: $20,000; Format: 32MS/32WS/32MD/32WD/32XD | (Scotland) Christopher Grimley (Scotland) Matthew Grimley | (Denmark) Kristoffer Kolding (Denmark) Calvin Lundsgaard |
| 28 September | Dutch Open: Dates: 30 September – 4 October; Host: 's-Hertogenbosch, Netherlands; Venue: Maaspoort; Level: International Challenge; Prize: $20,000; Format: 32MS/32WS/32MD/32WD/32XD | Score: 21–13, 21–10 | |
| 28 September | Dutch Open: Dates: 30 September – 4 October; Host: 's-Hertogenbosch, Netherlands; Venue: Maaspoort; Level: International Challenge; Prize: $20,000; Format: 32MS/32WS/32MD/32WD/32XD | (Germany) Stine Küspert (Germany) Isabel Lohau | (Netherlands) Kirsten de Wit (Netherlands) Debora Jille |
| 28 September | Dutch Open: Dates: 30 September – 4 October; Host: 's-Hertogenbosch, Netherlands; Venue: Maaspoort; Level: International Challenge; Prize: $20,000; Format: 32MS/32WS/32MD/32WD/32XD | Score: 21–17, 21–17 | |
| 28 September | Dutch Open: Dates: 30 September – 4 October; Host: 's-Hertogenbosch, Netherlands; Venue: Maaspoort; Level: International Challenge; Prize: $20,000; Format: 32MS/32WS/32MD/32WD/32XD | (Denmark) Jeppe Søby (Denmark) Sofie Røjkjær | (Denmark) Jesper Toft (Denmark) Amalie Cecilie Kudsk |
| 28 September | Dutch Open: Dates: 30 September – 4 October; Host: 's-Hertogenbosch, Netherlands; Venue: Maaspoort; Level: International Challenge; Prize: $20,000; Format: 32MS/32WS/32MD/32WD/32XD | Score: 11–21, 24–22, 23–21 | |
| 28 September | North Harbour International: Dates: 30 September – 4 October; Host: Auckland, New Zealand; Venue: Badminton North Harbour Centre; Level: International Challenge; Prize: $20,000; Format: 64MS/32WS/32MD/32WD/32XD | (Japan) Rei Miyashita | (Chinese Taipei) Wang Po-wei |
| 28 September | North Harbour International: Dates: 30 September – 4 October; Host: Auckland, New Zealand; Venue: Badminton North Harbour Centre; Level: International Challenge; Prize: $20,000; Format: 64MS/32WS/32MD/32WD/32XD | Score: 22–20, 21–19 | |
| 28 September | North Harbour International: Dates: 30 September – 4 October; Host: Auckland, New Zealand; Venue: Badminton North Harbour Centre; Level: International Challenge; Prize: $20,000; Format: 64MS/32WS/32MD/32WD/32XD | (Chinese Taipei) Tung Ciou-tong | (Chinese Taipei) Chen Su-yu |
| 28 September | North Harbour International: Dates: 30 September – 4 October; Host: Auckland, New Zealand; Venue: Badminton North Harbour Centre; Level: International Challenge; Prize: $20,000; Format: 64MS/32WS/32MD/32WD/32XD | Score: 21–19, 11–21, 21–8 | |
| 28 September | North Harbour International: Dates: 30 September – 4 October; Host: Auckland, New Zealand; Venue: Badminton North Harbour Centre; Level: International Challenge; Prize: $20,000; Format: 64MS/32WS/32MD/32WD/32XD | (Chinese Taipei) Chiu Shao-hua (Chinese Taipei) Lin Bing-wei | (Chinese Taipei) Huang Tsung-i (Chinese Taipei) Lin Ting-yu |
| 28 September | North Harbour International: Dates: 30 September – 4 October; Host: Auckland, New Zealand; Venue: Badminton North Harbour Centre; Level: International Challenge; Prize: $20,000; Format: 64MS/32WS/32MD/32WD/32XD | Score: 21–19, 21–16 | |
| 28 September | North Harbour International: Dates: 30 September – 4 October; Host: Auckland, New Zealand; Venue: Badminton North Harbour Centre; Level: International Challenge; Prize: $20,000; Format: 64MS/32WS/32MD/32WD/32XD | (Chinese Taipei) Hsieh Mi-yen (Chinese Taipei) Yu Chien-hui | (Australia) Laudya Chelsea Griselda (Australia) Nozomi Shimizu |
| 28 September | North Harbour International: Dates: 30 September – 4 October; Host: Auckland, New Zealand; Venue: Badminton North Harbour Centre; Level: International Challenge; Prize: $20,000; Format: 64MS/32WS/32MD/32WD/32XD | Score: 17–21, 21–11, 21–16 | |
| 28 September | North Harbour International: Dates: 30 September – 4 October; Host: Auckland, New Zealand; Venue: Badminton North Harbour Centre; Level: International Challenge; Prize: $20,000; Format: 64MS/32WS/32MD/32WD/32XD | (Australia) Andika Ramadiansyah (Australia) Nozomi Shimizu | (Chinese Taipei) Lin Bing-wei (Chinese Taipei) Liao Jui-chi |
| 28 September | North Harbour International: Dates: 30 September – 4 October; Host: Auckland, New Zealand; Venue: Badminton North Harbour Centre; Level: International Challenge; Prize: $20,000; Format: 64MS/32WS/32MD/32WD/32XD | Score: 21–10, 21–18 | |
| 28 September | Uganda International: Dates: 1–4 October; Host: Kampala, Uganda; Venue: Lugogo Indoor Arena; Level: International Series; Prize: $10,000; Format: 32MS/32WS/32MD/16WD/16XD | (Myanmar) Hein Htut | (Iran) Ali Hayati |
| 28 September | Uganda International: Dates: 1–4 October; Host: Kampala, Uganda; Venue: Lugogo Indoor Arena; Level: International Series; Prize: $10,000; Format: 32MS/32WS/32MD/16WD/16XD | Score: 19–21, 21–12, 21–13 | |
| 28 September | Uganda International: Dates: 1–4 October; Host: Kampala, Uganda; Venue: Lugogo Indoor Arena; Level: International Series; Prize: $10,000; Format: 32MS/32WS/32MD/16WD/16XD | (India) Aesha Gandhi | (India) Akshita Manral |
| 28 September | Uganda International: Dates: 1–4 October; Host: Kampala, Uganda; Venue: Lugogo Indoor Arena; Level: International Series; Prize: $10,000; Format: 32MS/32WS/32MD/16WD/16XD | Score: 22–20, 17–21, 21–7 | |
| 28 September | Uganda International: Dates: 1–4 October; Host: Kampala, Uganda; Venue: Lugogo Indoor Arena; Level: International Series; Prize: $10,000; Format: 32MS/32WS/32MD/16WD/16XD | (Malaysia) Hafiz Hakimi Hashim (Malaysia) Wong Meng Fong | (India) Manav Choudhary (India) Himanshu Tiwari |
| 28 September | Uganda International: Dates: 1–4 October; Host: Kampala, Uganda; Venue: Lugogo Indoor Arena; Level: International Series; Prize: $10,000; Format: 32MS/32WS/32MD/16WD/16XD | Score: 22–20, 21–19 | |
| 28 September | Uganda International: Dates: 1–4 October; Host: Kampala, Uganda; Venue: Lugogo Indoor Arena; Level: International Series; Prize: $10,000; Format: 32MS/32WS/32MD/16WD/16XD | (India) Akshita Manral (India) Ishita Negi | (India) Sonali Singh (India) Ritika Thaker |
| 28 September | Uganda International: Dates: 1–4 October; Host: Kampala, Uganda; Venue: Lugogo Indoor Arena; Level: International Series; Prize: $10,000; Format: 32MS/32WS/32MD/16WD/16XD | Score: 18–21, 21–19, 21–16 | |
| 28 September | Uganda International: Dates: 1–4 October; Host: Kampala, Uganda; Venue: Lugogo Indoor Arena; Level: International Series; Prize: $10,000; Format: 32MS/32WS/32MD/16WD/16XD | (Malaysia) Hafiz Hakimi Hashim (Malaysia) Lim Xuan | (Uganda) Muzafaru Lubega (Uganda) Gladys Mbabazi |
| 28 September | Uganda International: Dates: 1–4 October; Host: Kampala, Uganda; Venue: Lugogo Indoor Arena; Level: International Series; Prize: $10,000; Format: 32MS/32WS/32MD/16WD/16XD | Score: 21–17, 21–10 | |
| 28 September | Bulgarian International: Dates: 1–4 October; Host: Sofia, Bulgaria; Venue: Badminton Hall "Europe"; Level: Future Series; Format: 32MS/32WS/32MD/8WD/32XD | (Denmark) Christopher Vittoriani | (Italy) Luca Zhou |
| 28 September | Bulgarian International: Dates: 1–4 October; Host: Sofia, Bulgaria; Venue: Badminton Hall "Europe"; Level: Future Series; Format: 32MS/32WS/32MD/8WD/32XD | Score: 21–9, 21–13 | |
| 28 September | Bulgarian International: Dates: 1–4 October; Host: Sofia, Bulgaria; Venue: Badminton Hall "Europe"; Level: Future Series; Format: 32MS/32WS/32MD/8WD/32XD | (Ukraine) Maria Koriagina | (Denmark) Marie Viscovich |
| 28 September | Bulgarian International: Dates: 1–4 October; Host: Sofia, Bulgaria; Venue: Badminton Hall "Europe"; Level: Future Series; Format: 32MS/32WS/32MD/8WD/32XD | Score: 25–23, 21–9 | |
| 28 September | Bulgarian International: Dates: 1–4 October; Host: Sofia, Bulgaria; Venue: Badminton Hall "Europe"; Level: Future Series; Format: 32MS/32WS/32MD/8WD/32XD | (Serbia) Andrija Doder (Serbia) Sergej Lukic | (Malaysia) Chong Zi Hin (Malaysia) Pang Khai Zhe |
| 28 September | Bulgarian International: Dates: 1–4 October; Host: Sofia, Bulgaria; Venue: Badminton Hall "Europe"; Level: Future Series; Format: 32MS/32WS/32MD/8WD/32XD | Score: 12–21, 22–20, 21–10 | |
| 28 September | Bulgarian International: Dates: 1–4 October; Host: Sofia, Bulgaria; Venue: Badminton Hall "Europe"; Level: Future Series; Format: 32MS/32WS/32MD/8WD/32XD | (Ukraine) Maria Koriagina (Ukraine) Yaroslava Vantsarovska | (Bulgaria) Raia Pashova (Bulgaria) Gergana Pavlova |
| 28 September | Bulgarian International: Dates: 1–4 October; Host: Sofia, Bulgaria; Venue: Badminton Hall "Europe"; Level: Future Series; Format: 32MS/32WS/32MD/8WD/32XD | Score: 21–18, 21–10 | |
| 28 September | Bulgarian International: Dates: 1–4 October; Host: Sofia, Bulgaria; Venue: Badminton Hall "Europe"; Level: Future Series; Format: 32MS/32WS/32MD/8WD/32XD | (Lithuania) Rokas Lesinskas (Ukraine) Yaroslava Vantsarovska | (Denmark) Christopher Vittoriani (Denmark) Marie Viscovich |
| 28 September | Bulgarian International: Dates: 1–4 October; Host: Sofia, Bulgaria; Venue: Badminton Hall "Europe"; Level: Future Series; Format: 32MS/32WS/32MD/8WD/32XD | Score: 22–20, 21–17 | |

=== October ===
| Week commencing | Tournament | Champions | Runners-up |
|---|---|---|---|
| 5 October | Arctic Open (Draw): Dates: 6–11 October; Host: Vantaa, Finland; Venue: Energia Areena; Level: Super 500; Prize: $500,000; Format: 32MS/32WS/32MD/32WD/32XD | (Denmark) Anders Antonsen | (Japan) Yushi Tanaka |
| 5 October | Arctic Open (Draw): Dates: 6–11 October; Host: Vantaa, Finland; Venue: Energia Areena; Level: Super 500; Prize: $500,000; Format: 32MS/32WS/32MD/32WD/32XD | Score: 16–21, 21–16, 27–25 | |
| 5 October | Arctic Open (Draw): Dates: 6–11 October; Host: Vantaa, Finland; Venue: Energia Areena; Level: Super 500; Prize: $500,000; Format: 32MS/32WS/32MD/32WD/32XD | (Denmark) Mia Blichfeldt | (Thailand) Ratchanok Intanon |
| 5 October | Arctic Open (Draw): Dates: 6–11 October; Host: Vantaa, Finland; Venue: Energia Areena; Level: Super 500; Prize: $500,000; Format: 32MS/32WS/32MD/32WD/32XD | Score: 21–17, 21–13 | |
| 5 October | Arctic Open (Draw): Dates: 6–11 October; Host: Vantaa, Finland; Venue: Energia Areena; Level: Super 500; Prize: $500,000; Format: 32MS/32WS/32MD/32WD/32XD | (Malaysia) Aaron Tai (Malaysia) Yap Roy King | (Chinese Taipei) Lai Po-yu (Chinese Taipei) Tsai Fu-cheng |
| 5 October | Arctic Open (Draw): Dates: 6–11 October; Host: Vantaa, Finland; Venue: Energia Areena; Level: Super 500; Prize: $500,000; Format: 32MS/32WS/32MD/32WD/32XD | Score: 21–19, 21–19 | |
| 5 October | Arctic Open (Draw): Dates: 6–11 October; Host: Vantaa, Finland; Venue: Energia Areena; Level: Super 500; Prize: $500,000; Format: 32MS/32WS/32MD/32WD/32XD | (China) Chen Fanshutian (China) Luo Xumin | (Chinese Taipei) Hsu Yin-hui (Chinese Taipei) Lin Jhih-yun |
| 5 October | Arctic Open (Draw): Dates: 6–11 October; Host: Vantaa, Finland; Venue: Energia Areena; Level: Super 500; Prize: $500,000; Format: 32MS/32WS/32MD/32WD/32XD | Score: 21–18, 21–19 | |
| 5 October | Arctic Open (Draw): Dates: 6–11 October; Host: Vantaa, Finland; Venue: Energia Areena; Level: Super 500; Prize: $500,000; Format: 32MS/32WS/32MD/32WD/32XD | (China) Jiang Zhenbang (China) Wei Yaxin | (China) Gao Jiaxuan (China) Wu Mengying |
| 5 October | Arctic Open (Draw): Dates: 6–11 October; Host: Vantaa, Finland; Venue: Energia Areena; Level: Super 500; Prize: $500,000; Format: 32MS/32WS/32MD/32WD/32XD | Score: 21–18, 21–16 | |
| 5 October | Arise International: Dates: 7–11 October; Host: Brookshire, Texas, USA; Venue: Arise Sports Complex; Level: International Challenge; Prize: $20,000; Format: 32MS/32WS/32MD/16WD/32XD | (Indonesia) Muhammad Reza Al Fajri | (Brazil) Deivid Silva |
| 5 October | Arise International: Dates: 7–11 October; Host: Brookshire, Texas, USA; Venue: Arise Sports Complex; Level: International Challenge; Prize: $20,000; Format: 32MS/32WS/32MD/16WD/32XD | Score: 21–18, 24–22 | |
| 5 October | Arise International: Dates: 7–11 October; Host: Brookshire, Texas, USA; Venue: Arise Sports Complex; Level: International Challenge; Prize: $20,000; Format: 32MS/32WS/32MD/16WD/32XD | (Chinese Taipei) Huang Ching-ping | (United States) Ishika Jaiswal |
| 5 October | Arise International: Dates: 7–11 October; Host: Brookshire, Texas, USA; Venue: Arise Sports Complex; Level: International Challenge; Prize: $20,000; Format: 32MS/32WS/32MD/16WD/32XD | Score: 21–15, 14–21, 23–21 | |
| 5 October | Arise International: Dates: 7–11 October; Host: Brookshire, Texas, USA; Venue: Arise Sports Complex; Level: International Challenge; Prize: $20,000; Format: 32MS/32WS/32MD/16WD/32XD | (Canada) Kevin Lee (Canada) Ty Alexander Lindeman | (Brazil) Fabrício Farias (Brazil) Davi Silva |
| 5 October | Arise International: Dates: 7–11 October; Host: Brookshire, Texas, USA; Venue: Arise Sports Complex; Level: International Challenge; Prize: $20,000; Format: 32MS/32WS/32MD/16WD/32XD | Score: 15–21, 21–11, 22–20 | |
| 5 October | Arise International: Dates: 7–11 October; Host: Brookshire, Texas, USA; Venue: Arise Sports Complex; Level: International Challenge; Prize: $20,000; Format: 32MS/32WS/32MD/16WD/32XD | (Canada) Jackie Dent (Canada) Crystal Lai | (Chinese Taipei) Hsieh Chih-ying (Chinese Taipei) Lee Yu-hsuan |
| 5 October | Arise International: Dates: 7–11 October; Host: Brookshire, Texas, USA; Venue: Arise Sports Complex; Level: International Challenge; Prize: $20,000; Format: 32MS/32WS/32MD/16WD/32XD | Score: 21–15, 21–9 | |
| 5 October | Arise International: Dates: 7–11 October; Host: Brookshire, Texas, USA; Venue: Arise Sports Complex; Level: International Challenge; Prize: $20,000; Format: 32MS/32WS/32MD/16WD/32XD | (Brazil) Davi Silva (Brazil) Sânia Lima | (Canada) Timothy Lock (Canada) Chloe Hoang |
| 5 October | Arise International: Dates: 7–11 October; Host: Brookshire, Texas, USA; Venue: Arise Sports Complex; Level: International Challenge; Prize: $20,000; Format: 32MS/32WS/32MD/16WD/32XD | Score: 21–17, 21–23, 21–14 | |
| 5 October | Bendigo International: Dates: 7–11 October; Host: Bendigo, Victoria, Australia; Venue: Bendigo Eaglehawk Badminton Association; Level: International Challenge; Prize: $20,000; Format: 64MS/32WS/32MD/32WD/32XD | (Chinese Taipei) Liao Jhuo-fu | (India) Ansh Negi |
| 5 October | Bendigo International: Dates: 7–11 October; Host: Bendigo, Victoria, Australia; Venue: Bendigo Eaglehawk Badminton Association; Level: International Challenge; Prize: $20,000; Format: 64MS/32WS/32MD/32WD/32XD | Score: 12–21, 21–16, 21–14 | |
| 5 October | Bendigo International: Dates: 7–11 October; Host: Bendigo, Victoria, Australia; Venue: Bendigo Eaglehawk Badminton Association; Level: International Challenge; Prize: $20,000; Format: 64MS/32WS/32MD/32WD/32XD | (Chinese Taipei) Liao Jui-chi | (Chinese Taipei) Tung Ciou-tong |
| 5 October | Bendigo International: Dates: 7–11 October; Host: Bendigo, Victoria, Australia; Venue: Bendigo Eaglehawk Badminton Association; Level: International Challenge; Prize: $20,000; Format: 64MS/32WS/32MD/32WD/32XD | Score: 22–20, 18–21, 21–8 | |
| 5 October | Bendigo International: Dates: 7–11 October; Host: Bendigo, Victoria, Australia; Venue: Bendigo Eaglehawk Badminton Association; Level: International Challenge; Prize: $20,000; Format: 64MS/32WS/32MD/32WD/32XD | (Chinese Taipei) Chiu Shao-hua (Chinese Taipei) Lin Bing-wei | (Chinese Taipei) Huang Tsung-i (Chinese Taipei) Lin Ting-yu |
| 5 October | Bendigo International: Dates: 7–11 October; Host: Bendigo, Victoria, Australia; Venue: Bendigo Eaglehawk Badminton Association; Level: International Challenge; Prize: $20,000; Format: 64MS/32WS/32MD/32WD/32XD | Score: 22–20, 22–24, 21–18 | |
| 5 October | Bendigo International: Dates: 7–11 October; Host: Bendigo, Victoria, Australia; Venue: Bendigo Eaglehawk Badminton Association; Level: International Challenge; Prize: $20,000; Format: 64MS/32WS/32MD/32WD/32XD | (Chinese Taipei) Liao Jui-chi (Chinese Taipei) Lin Yen-yu | (Chinese Taipei) Chung Chia-en (Chinese Taipei) Wang You-zhu |
| 5 October | Bendigo International: Dates: 7–11 October; Host: Bendigo, Victoria, Australia; Venue: Bendigo Eaglehawk Badminton Association; Level: International Challenge; Prize: $20,000; Format: 64MS/32WS/32MD/32WD/32XD | Score: 21–14, 21–17 | |
| 5 October | Bendigo International: Dates: 7–11 October; Host: Bendigo, Victoria, Australia; Venue: Bendigo Eaglehawk Badminton Association; Level: International Challenge; Prize: $20,000; Format: 64MS/32WS/32MD/32WD/32XD | (Australia) Andika Ramadiansyah (Australia) Nozomi Shimizu | (Chinese Taipei) Lin Bing-wei (Chinese Taipei) Lin Yen-yu |
| 5 October | Bendigo International: Dates: 7–11 October; Host: Bendigo, Victoria, Australia; Venue: Bendigo Eaglehawk Badminton Association; Level: International Challenge; Prize: $20,000; Format: 64MS/32WS/32MD/32WD/32XD | Score: 21–12, 21–14 | |
| 5 October | Türkiye International: Dates: 7–11 October; Host: Istanbul, Türkiye; Venue: Ata Sporları Merkezi; Level: International Challenge; Prize: $20,000; Format: 32MS/32WS/32MD/32WD/32XD | (Denmark) Victor Ørding Kauffmann | (Denmark) William Bøgebjerg |
| 5 October | Türkiye International: Dates: 7–11 October; Host: Istanbul, Türkiye; Venue: Ata Sporları Merkezi; Level: International Challenge; Prize: $20,000; Format: 32MS/32WS/32MD/32WD/32XD | Score: 21–19, 24–22 | |
| 5 October | Türkiye International: Dates: 7–11 October; Host: Istanbul, Türkiye; Venue: Ata Sporları Merkezi; Level: International Challenge; Prize: $20,000; Format: 32MS/32WS/32MD/32WD/32XD | (India) Anmol Kharb | (India) Aakarshi Kashyap |
| 5 October | Türkiye International: Dates: 7–11 October; Host: Istanbul, Türkiye; Venue: Ata Sporları Merkezi; Level: International Challenge; Prize: $20,000; Format: 32MS/32WS/32MD/32WD/32XD | Score: 21–11, 21–14 | |
| 5 October | Türkiye International: Dates: 7–11 October; Host: Istanbul, Türkiye; Venue: Ata Sporları Merkezi; Level: International Challenge; Prize: $20,000; Format: 32MS/32WS/32MD/32WD/32XD | (Denmark) William Kryger Boe (Denmark) Rasmus Espersen | (India) Suraj Goala (India) Nicholas Raj |
| 5 October | Türkiye International: Dates: 7–11 October; Host: Istanbul, Türkiye; Venue: Ata Sporları Merkezi; Level: International Challenge; Prize: $20,000; Format: 32MS/32WS/32MD/32WD/32XD | Score: 21–14, 21–19 | |
| 5 October | Türkiye International: Dates: 7–11 October; Host: Istanbul, Türkiye; Venue: Ata Sporları Merkezi; Level: International Challenge; Prize: $20,000; Format: 32MS/32WS/32MD/32WD/32XD | (Japan) Mao Hatasue (Japan) Kanano Muroya | (Turkey) Bengisu Erçetin (Turkey) Nazlıcan İnci |
| 5 October | Türkiye International: Dates: 7–11 October; Host: Istanbul, Türkiye; Venue: Ata Sporları Merkezi; Level: International Challenge; Prize: $20,000; Format: 32MS/32WS/32MD/32WD/32XD | Score: 21–14, 21–18 | |
| 5 October | Türkiye International: Dates: 7–11 October; Host: Istanbul, Türkiye; Venue: Ata Sporları Merkezi; Level: International Challenge; Prize: $20,000; Format: 32MS/32WS/32MD/32WD/32XD | (France) Natan Begga (France) Elsa Jacob | (Individual Neutral Athletes) Maksim Ogloblin (Individual Neutral Athletes) Anastasiia Boiarun |
| 5 October | Türkiye International: Dates: 7–11 October; Host: Istanbul, Türkiye; Venue: Ata Sporları Merkezi; Level: International Challenge; Prize: $20,000; Format: 32MS/32WS/32MD/32WD/32XD | Score: 21–18, 21–13 | |
| 12 October | Denmark Open (Draw): Dates: 13–18 October; Host: Odense, Denmark; Venue: Arena Fyn; Level: Super 750; Prize: $950,000; Format: 32MS/32WS/32MD/32WD/32XD | (France) Alex Lanier | (Denmark) Anders Antonsen |
| 12 October | Denmark Open (Draw): Dates: 13–18 October; Host: Odense, Denmark; Venue: Arena Fyn; Level: Super 750; Prize: $950,000; Format: 32MS/32WS/32MD/32WD/32XD | Score: 21–15, 13–21, 21–13 | |
| 12 October | Denmark Open (Draw): Dates: 13–18 October; Host: Odense, Denmark; Venue: Arena Fyn; Level: Super 750; Prize: $950,000; Format: 32MS/32WS/32MD/32WD/32XD | (South Korea) An Se-young | (Japan) Akane Yamaguchi |
| 12 October | Denmark Open (Draw): Dates: 13–18 October; Host: Odense, Denmark; Venue: Arena Fyn; Level: Super 750; Prize: $950,000; Format: 32MS/32WS/32MD/32WD/32XD | Score: 21–23, 21–14, 21–18 | |
| 12 October | Denmark Open (Draw): Dates: 13–18 October; Host: Odense, Denmark; Venue: Arena Fyn; Level: Super 750; Prize: $950,000; Format: 32MS/32WS/32MD/32WD/32XD | (Indonesia) Fajar Alfian (Indonesia) Muhammad Shohibul Fikri | (Malaysia) Aaron Chia (Malaysia) Soh Wooi Yik |
| 12 October | Denmark Open (Draw): Dates: 13–18 October; Host: Odense, Denmark; Venue: Arena Fyn; Level: Super 750; Prize: $950,000; Format: 32MS/32WS/32MD/32WD/32XD | Score: 21–8, 21–11 | |
| 12 October | Denmark Open (Draw): Dates: 13–18 October; Host: Odense, Denmark; Venue: Arena Fyn; Level: Super 750; Prize: $950,000; Format: 32MS/32WS/32MD/32WD/32XD | (Malaysia) Pearly Tan (Malaysia) Thinaah Muralitharan | (Japan) Hinata Suzuki (Japan) Nao Yamakita |
| 12 October | Denmark Open (Draw): Dates: 13–18 October; Host: Odense, Denmark; Venue: Arena Fyn; Level: Super 750; Prize: $950,000; Format: 32MS/32WS/32MD/32WD/32XD | Score: 21–18, 21–11 | |
| 12 October | Denmark Open (Draw): Dates: 13–18 October; Host: Odense, Denmark; Venue: Arena Fyn; Level: Super 750; Prize: $950,000; Format: 32MS/32WS/32MD/32WD/32XD | (China) Jiang Zhenbang (China) Wei Yaxin | (China) Feng Yanzhe (China) Huang Dongping |
| 12 October | Denmark Open (Draw): Dates: 13–18 October; Host: Odense, Denmark; Venue: Arena Fyn; Level: Super 750; Prize: $950,000; Format: 32MS/32WS/32MD/32WD/32XD | Score: 21–18, 8–21, 21–16 | |
| 12 October | Malaysia Super 100 (Draw): Dates: 13–18 October; Host: Iskandar Puteri, Johor, Malaysia; Venue: EduCity Sports Complex; Level: Super 100; Prize: $120,000; Format: 64MS/32WS/32MD/32WD/32XD | (China) Wang Zijun | (China) Zhu Xuanchen |
| 12 October | Malaysia Super 100 (Draw): Dates: 13–18 October; Host: Iskandar Puteri, Johor, Malaysia; Venue: EduCity Sports Complex; Level: Super 100; Prize: $120,000; Format: 64MS/32WS/32MD/32WD/32XD | Score: 21–11, 21–15 | |
| 12 October | Malaysia Super 100 (Draw): Dates: 13–18 October; Host: Iskandar Puteri, Johor, Malaysia; Venue: EduCity Sports Complex; Level: Super 100; Prize: $120,000; Format: 64MS/32WS/32MD/32WD/32XD | (China) Yuan Anqi | (China) Xu Wenjing |
| 12 October | Malaysia Super 100 (Draw): Dates: 13–18 October; Host: Iskandar Puteri, Johor, Malaysia; Venue: EduCity Sports Complex; Level: Super 100; Prize: $120,000; Format: 64MS/32WS/32MD/32WD/32XD | Score: 21–12, 21–16 | |
| 12 October | Malaysia Super 100 (Draw): Dates: 13–18 October; Host: Iskandar Puteri, Johor, Malaysia; Venue: EduCity Sports Complex; Level: Super 100; Prize: $120,000; Format: 64MS/32WS/32MD/32WD/32XD | (South Korea) Jin Yong (South Korea) Jo Song-hyun | (South Korea) Na Sung-seung (South Korea) Wang Chan |
| 12 October | Malaysia Super 100 (Draw): Dates: 13–18 October; Host: Iskandar Puteri, Johor, Malaysia; Venue: EduCity Sports Complex; Level: Super 100; Prize: $120,000; Format: 64MS/32WS/32MD/32WD/32XD | Score: 21–17, 21–18 | |
| 12 October | Malaysia Super 100 (Draw): Dates: 13–18 October; Host: Iskandar Puteri, Johor, Malaysia; Venue: EduCity Sports Complex; Level: Super 100; Prize: $120,000; Format: 64MS/32WS/32MD/32WD/32XD | (South Korea) Lee Seo-jin (South Korea) Lee Yeon-woo | (South Korea) Lee Seung-hee (South Korea) Park Min-ji |
| 12 October | Malaysia Super 100 (Draw): Dates: 13–18 October; Host: Iskandar Puteri, Johor, Malaysia; Venue: EduCity Sports Complex; Level: Super 100; Prize: $120,000; Format: 64MS/32WS/32MD/32WD/32XD | Score: 18–21, 21–17, 21–19 | |
| 12 October | Malaysia Super 100 (Draw): Dates: 13–18 October; Host: Iskandar Puteri, Johor, Malaysia; Venue: EduCity Sports Complex; Level: Super 100; Prize: $120,000; Format: 64MS/32WS/32MD/32WD/32XD | (China) Shen Xuanyao (China) Zhang Jiahan | (China) Ma Xixiang (China) Qin Huizhi |
| 12 October | Malaysia Super 100 (Draw): Dates: 13–18 October; Host: Iskandar Puteri, Johor, Malaysia; Venue: EduCity Sports Complex; Level: Super 100; Prize: $120,000; Format: 64MS/32WS/32MD/32WD/32XD | Score: 30–29, 15–21, 21–18 | |
| 12 October | Sydney International: Dates: 14–18 October; Host: Lidcombe, New South Wales, Australia; Venue: Roketto Badminton Centre; Level: International Challenge; Prize: $20,000; Format: 64MS/32WS/32MD/32WD/32XD | (Australia) Muhammad Rafi Zafran Ferary | (Chinese Taipei) Huang Yu |
| 12 October | Sydney International: Dates: 14–18 October; Host: Lidcombe, New South Wales, Australia; Venue: Roketto Badminton Centre; Level: International Challenge; Prize: $20,000; Format: 64MS/32WS/32MD/32WD/32XD | Score: 21–19, 15–21, 21–7 | |
| 12 October | Sydney International: Dates: 14–18 October; Host: Lidcombe, New South Wales, Australia; Venue: Roketto Badminton Centre; Level: International Challenge; Prize: $20,000; Format: 64MS/32WS/32MD/32WD/32XD | (Chinese Taipei) Chen Su-yu | (Chinese Taipei) Tung Ciou-tong |
| 12 October | Sydney International: Dates: 14–18 October; Host: Lidcombe, New South Wales, Australia; Venue: Roketto Badminton Centre; Level: International Challenge; Prize: $20,000; Format: 64MS/32WS/32MD/32WD/32XD | Score: 17–21, 21–14, 23–21 | |
| 12 October | Sydney International: Dates: 14–18 October; Host: Lidcombe, New South Wales, Australia; Venue: Roketto Badminton Centre; Level: International Challenge; Prize: $20,000; Format: 64MS/32WS/32MD/32WD/32XD | (Philippines) Solomon Padiz Jr. (Philippines) Julius Villabrille | (Chinese Taipei) Chiu Shao-hua (Chinese Taipei) Lin Bing-wei |
| 12 October | Sydney International: Dates: 14–18 October; Host: Lidcombe, New South Wales, Australia; Venue: Roketto Badminton Centre; Level: International Challenge; Prize: $20,000; Format: 64MS/32WS/32MD/32WD/32XD | Score: 21–18, 18–21, 21–13 | |
| 12 October | Sydney International: Dates: 14–18 October; Host: Lidcombe, New South Wales, Australia; Venue: Roketto Badminton Centre; Level: International Challenge; Prize: $20,000; Format: 64MS/32WS/32MD/32WD/32XD | (Japan) Arisa Ishida (Japan) Akari Sato | (Japan) Sora Hatakeyama (Japan) Yumi Tanabe |
| 12 October | Sydney International: Dates: 14–18 October; Host: Lidcombe, New South Wales, Australia; Venue: Roketto Badminton Centre; Level: International Challenge; Prize: $20,000; Format: 64MS/32WS/32MD/32WD/32XD | Score: 21–14, 21–10 | |
| 12 October | Sydney International: Dates: 14–18 October; Host: Lidcombe, New South Wales, Australia; Venue: Roketto Badminton Centre; Level: International Challenge; Prize: $20,000; Format: 64MS/32WS/32MD/32WD/32XD | (Chinese Taipei) Lu Chen (Chinese Taipei) Chang Yun-jung | (New Zealand) Raphael Chris Deloy (Australia) Sydney Tjonadi |
| 12 October | Sydney International: Dates: 14–18 October; Host: Lidcombe, New South Wales, Australia; Venue: Roketto Badminton Centre; Level: International Challenge; Prize: $20,000; Format: 64MS/32WS/32MD/32WD/32XD | Score: 21–13, 21–16 | |
| 12 October | Santo Domingo Open: Dates: 14–18 October; Host: Santo Domingo, Dominican Republic; Venue: Sport Hall New Horizons School; Level: International Series; Prize: $10,000; Format: 32MS/32WS/32MD/16WD/16XD | (Germany) Matthias Kicklitz | (India) Shashwat Dalal |
| 12 October | Santo Domingo Open: Dates: 14–18 October; Host: Santo Domingo, Dominican Republic; Venue: Sport Hall New Horizons School; Level: International Series; Prize: $10,000; Format: 32MS/32WS/32MD/16WD/16XD | Score: 21–19, 21–18 | |
| 12 October | Santo Domingo Open: Dates: 14–18 October; Host: Santo Domingo, Dominican Republic; Venue: Sport Hall New Horizons School; Level: International Series; Prize: $10,000; Format: 32MS/32WS/32MD/16WD/16XD | (Japan) Nayu Shirakawa | (Hungary) Ágnes Kőrösi |
| 12 October | Santo Domingo Open: Dates: 14–18 October; Host: Santo Domingo, Dominican Republic; Venue: Sport Hall New Horizons School; Level: International Series; Prize: $10,000; Format: 32MS/32WS/32MD/16WD/16XD | Score: 21–17, 21–12 | |
| 12 October | Santo Domingo Open: Dates: 14–18 October; Host: Santo Domingo, Dominican Republic; Venue: Sport Hall New Horizons School; Level: International Series; Prize: $10,000; Format: 32MS/32WS/32MD/16WD/16XD | (Brazil) Izak Batalha (Brazil) Matheus Voigt | (Brazil) Joaquim Mendonça (Brazil) Welton Menezes |
| 12 October | Santo Domingo Open: Dates: 14–18 October; Host: Santo Domingo, Dominican Republic; Venue: Sport Hall New Horizons School; Level: International Series; Prize: $10,000; Format: 32MS/32WS/32MD/16WD/16XD | Score: 21–8, 21–8 | |
| 12 October | Santo Domingo Open: Dates: 14–18 October; Host: Santo Domingo, Dominican Republic; Venue: Sport Hall New Horizons School; Level: International Series; Prize: $10,000; Format: 32MS/32WS/32MD/16WD/16XD | (Chinese Taipei) Hsieh Chih-ying (Chinese Taipei) Lee Yu-hsuan | (Austria) Hanna Gillesberger (Hungary) Ágnes Kőrösi |
| 12 October | Santo Domingo Open: Dates: 14–18 October; Host: Santo Domingo, Dominican Republic; Venue: Sport Hall New Horizons School; Level: International Series; Prize: $10,000; Format: 32MS/32WS/32MD/16WD/16XD | Score: 21–11, 21–16 | |
| 12 October | Santo Domingo Open: Dates: 14–18 October; Host: Santo Domingo, Dominican Republic; Venue: Sport Hall New Horizons School; Level: International Series; Prize: $10,000; Format: 32MS/32WS/32MD/16WD/16XD | (Germany) Justin Seibel (Germany) Miranda Wilson | (Brazil) Izak Batalha (Brazil) Ana Júlia Ywata |
| 12 October | Santo Domingo Open: Dates: 14–18 October; Host: Santo Domingo, Dominican Republic; Venue: Sport Hall New Horizons School; Level: International Series; Prize: $10,000; Format: 32MS/32WS/32MD/16WD/16XD | Score: 24–22, 22–20 | |
| 12 October | Czech Open: Dates: 15–18 October; Host: Prague, Czechia; Venue: Sports hall Řepy; Level: International Challenge; Prize: $20,000; Format: 32MS/32WS/32MD/32WD/32XD | (Finland) Joakim Oldorff | (Denmark) Victor Ørding Kauffmann |
| 12 October | Czech Open: Dates: 15–18 October; Host: Prague, Czechia; Venue: Sports hall Řepy; Level: International Challenge; Prize: $20,000; Format: 32MS/32WS/32MD/32WD/32XD | Score: 21–16, 21–19 | |
| 12 October | Czech Open: Dates: 15–18 October; Host: Prague, Czechia; Venue: Sports hall Řepy; Level: International Challenge; Prize: $20,000; Format: 32MS/32WS/32MD/32WD/32XD | (Chinese Taipei) Sung Shuo-yun | (Canada) Wen Yu Zhang |
| 12 October | Czech Open: Dates: 15–18 October; Host: Prague, Czechia; Venue: Sports hall Řepy; Level: International Challenge; Prize: $20,000; Format: 32MS/32WS/32MD/32WD/32XD | Score: 11–21, 21–17, 21–19 | |
| 12 October | Czech Open: Dates: 15–18 October; Host: Prague, Czechia; Venue: Sports hall Řepy; Level: International Challenge; Prize: $20,000; Format: 32MS/32WS/32MD/32WD/32XD | (England) Alex Green (England) Zach Russ | (France) Maël Cattoen (France) Lucas Renoir |
| 12 October | Czech Open: Dates: 15–18 October; Host: Prague, Czechia; Venue: Sports hall Řepy; Level: International Challenge; Prize: $20,000; Format: 32MS/32WS/32MD/32WD/32XD | Score: 15–21, 21–19, 21–16 | |
| 12 October | Czech Open: Dates: 15–18 October; Host: Prague, Czechia; Venue: Sports hall Řepy; Level: International Challenge; Prize: $20,000; Format: 32MS/32WS/32MD/32WD/32XD | (Germany) Stine Küspert (Germany) Isabel Lohau | (Germany) Selin Hübsch (Germany) Amelie Lehmann |
| 12 October | Czech Open: Dates: 15–18 October; Host: Prague, Czechia; Venue: Sports hall Řepy; Level: International Challenge; Prize: $20,000; Format: 32MS/32WS/32MD/32WD/32XD | Score: 21–19, 21–10 | |
| 12 October | Czech Open: Dates: 15–18 October; Host: Prague, Czechia; Venue: Sports hall Řepy; Level: International Challenge; Prize: $20,000; Format: 32MS/32WS/32MD/32WD/32XD | (Denmark) Jesper Toft (Denmark) Amalie Cecilie Kudsk | (Germany) Jan Colin Völker (Germany) Emma Moszczynski |
| 12 October | Czech Open: Dates: 15–18 October; Host: Prague, Czechia; Venue: Sports hall Řepy; Level: International Challenge; Prize: $20,000; Format: 32MS/32WS/32MD/32WD/32XD | Score: 21–12, 21–13 | |
| 19 October | Iran International Khazar (Caspian) Cup (cancelled): Dates: 19–22 October; Host: TBC, Iran; Venue: TBC; Level: Future Series; Format: 32MS/32WS/16MD/16WD/8XD | | |
| 19 October | Iran International Khazar (Caspian) Cup (cancelled): Dates: 19–22 October; Host: TBC, Iran; Venue: TBC; Level: Future Series; Format: 32MS/32WS/16MD/16WD/8XD | Score: | |
| 19 October | Iran International Khazar (Caspian) Cup (cancelled): Dates: 19–22 October; Host: TBC, Iran; Venue: TBC; Level: Future Series; Format: 32MS/32WS/16MD/16WD/8XD | Score: | |
| 19 October | Iran International Khazar (Caspian) Cup (cancelled): Dates: 19–22 October; Host: TBC, Iran; Venue: TBC; Level: Future Series; Format: 32MS/32WS/16MD/16WD/8XD | Score: | |
| 19 October | Iran International Khazar (Caspian) Cup (cancelled): Dates: 19–22 October; Host: TBC, Iran; Venue: TBC; Level: Future Series; Format: 32MS/32WS/16MD/16WD/8XD | Score: | |
| 19 October | Iran International Khazar (Caspian) Cup (cancelled): Dates: 19–22 October; Host: TBC, Iran; Venue: TBC; Level: Future Series; Format: 32MS/32WS/16MD/16WD/8XD | Score: | |
| 19 October | French Open (Draw): Dates: 20–25 October; Host: Paris, France; Venue: Adidas Arena; Level: Super 750; Prize: $950,000; Format: 32MS/32WS/32MD/32WD/32XD | (France) Christo Popov | (Indonesia) Zaki Ubaidillah |
| 19 October | French Open (Draw): Dates: 20–25 October; Host: Paris, France; Venue: Adidas Arena; Level: Super 750; Prize: $950,000; Format: 32MS/32WS/32MD/32WD/32XD | Score: 21–11, 14–21, 21–13 | |
| 19 October | French Open (Draw): Dates: 20–25 October; Host: Paris, France; Venue: Adidas Arena; Level: Super 750; Prize: $950,000; Format: 32MS/32WS/32MD/32WD/32XD | (South Korea) An Se-young | (India) P. V. Sindhu |
| 19 October | French Open (Draw): Dates: 20–25 October; Host: Paris, France; Venue: Adidas Arena; Level: Super 750; Prize: $950,000; Format: 32MS/32WS/32MD/32WD/32XD | Score: 16–21, 21–11, 21–12 | |
| 19 October | French Open (Draw): Dates: 20–25 October; Host: Paris, France; Venue: Adidas Arena; Level: Super 750; Prize: $950,000; Format: 32MS/32WS/32MD/32WD/32XD | (Malaysia) Man Wei Chong (Malaysia) Tee Kai Wun | (Malaysia) Goh Sze Fei (Malaysia) Nur Izzuddin |
| 19 October | French Open (Draw): Dates: 20–25 October; Host: Paris, France; Venue: Adidas Arena; Level: Super 750; Prize: $950,000; Format: 32MS/32WS/32MD/32WD/32XD | Score: 13–21, 21–15, 21–7 | |
| 19 October | French Open (Draw): Dates: 20–25 October; Host: Paris, France; Venue: Adidas Arena; Level: Super 750; Prize: $950,000; Format: 32MS/32WS/32MD/32WD/32XD | (Japan) Yuki Fukushima (Japan) Mayu Matsumoto | (Malaysia) Pearly Tan (Malaysia) Thinaah Muralitharan |
| 19 October | French Open (Draw): Dates: 20–25 October; Host: Paris, France; Venue: Adidas Arena; Level: Super 750; Prize: $950,000; Format: 32MS/32WS/32MD/32WD/32XD | Score: 10–21, 21–17, 21–16 | |
| 19 October | French Open (Draw): Dates: 20–25 October; Host: Paris, France; Venue: Adidas Arena; Level: Super 750; Prize: $950,000; Format: 32MS/32WS/32MD/32WD/32XD | (China) Feng Yanzhe (China) Huang Dongping | (Malaysia) Hoo Pang Ron (Malaysia) Lai Pei Jing |
| 19 October | French Open (Draw): Dates: 20–25 October; Host: Paris, France; Venue: Adidas Arena; Level: Super 750; Prize: $950,000; Format: 32MS/32WS/32MD/32WD/32XD | Score: 21–10, 21–13 | |
| 19 October | Indonesia Masters Super 100 II (Draw): Dates: 20–25 October; Host: Kudus, Indonesia; Venue: GOR Djarum Arena; Level: Super 100; Prize: $120,000; Format: 64MS/32WS/32MD/32WD/32XD | (Indonesia) Richie Duta Richardo | (China) Dong Tianyao |
| 19 October | Indonesia Masters Super 100 II (Draw): Dates: 20–25 October; Host: Kudus, Indonesia; Venue: GOR Djarum Arena; Level: Super 100; Prize: $120,000; Format: 64MS/32WS/32MD/32WD/32XD | Score: 17–21, 21–12, 21–16 | |
| 19 October | Indonesia Masters Super 100 II (Draw): Dates: 20–25 October; Host: Kudus, Indonesia; Venue: GOR Djarum Arena; Level: Super 100; Prize: $120,000; Format: 64MS/32WS/32MD/32WD/32XD | (China) Xu Wenjing | (Hong Kong) Lo Sin Yan |
| 19 October | Indonesia Masters Super 100 II (Draw): Dates: 20–25 October; Host: Kudus, Indonesia; Venue: GOR Djarum Arena; Level: Super 100; Prize: $120,000; Format: 64MS/32WS/32MD/32WD/32XD | Score: 21–12, 21–16 | |
| 19 October | Indonesia Masters Super 100 II (Draw): Dates: 20–25 October; Host: Kudus, Indonesia; Venue: GOR Djarum Arena; Level: Super 100; Prize: $120,000; Format: 64MS/32WS/32MD/32WD/32XD | (Indonesia) Muhammad Rian Ardianto (Indonesia) Daniel Edgar Marvino | (South Korea) Jin Yong (South Korea) Jo Song-hyun |
| 19 October | Indonesia Masters Super 100 II (Draw): Dates: 20–25 October; Host: Kudus, Indonesia; Venue: GOR Djarum Arena; Level: Super 100; Prize: $120,000; Format: 64MS/32WS/32MD/32WD/32XD | Score: 21–19, 21–12 | |
| 19 October | Indonesia Masters Super 100 II (Draw): Dates: 20–25 October; Host: Kudus, Indonesia; Venue: GOR Djarum Arena; Level: Super 100; Prize: $120,000; Format: 64MS/32WS/32MD/32WD/32XD | (Indonesia) Isyana Syahira Meida (Indonesia) Rinjani Kwinnara Nastine | (Thailand) Hathaithip Mijad (Thailand) Napapakorn Tungkasatan |
| 19 October | Indonesia Masters Super 100 II (Draw): Dates: 20–25 October; Host: Kudus, Indonesia; Venue: GOR Djarum Arena; Level: Super 100; Prize: $120,000; Format: 64MS/32WS/32MD/32WD/32XD | Score: 21–15, 21–17 | |
| 19 October | Indonesia Masters Super 100 II (Draw): Dates: 20–25 October; Host: Kudus, Indonesia; Venue: GOR Djarum Arena; Level: Super 100; Prize: $120,000; Format: 64MS/32WS/32MD/32WD/32XD | (China) Li Hongyi (China) Huang Kexin | (Singapore) Terry Hee (Indonesia) Gloria Emanuelle Widjaja |
| 19 October | Indonesia Masters Super 100 II (Draw): Dates: 20–25 October; Host: Kudus, Indonesia; Venue: GOR Djarum Arena; Level: Super 100; Prize: $120,000; Format: 64MS/32WS/32MD/32WD/32XD | Score: 15–21, 21–5, 21–10 | |
| 19 October | Hellas International: Dates: 20–23 October; Host: Pyrgos, Greece; Venue: Pyrgos Indoor Hall; Level: Future Series; Format: 32MS/32WS/32MD/32WD/32XD | (England) Ethan Rose | (Denmark) Christopher Vittoriani |
| 19 October | Hellas International: Dates: 20–23 October; Host: Pyrgos, Greece; Venue: Pyrgos Indoor Hall; Level: Future Series; Format: 32MS/32WS/32MD/32WD/32XD | Score: 21–13, 21–6 | |
| 19 October | Hellas International: Dates: 20–23 October; Host: Pyrgos, Greece; Venue: Pyrgos Indoor Hall; Level: Future Series; Format: 32MS/32WS/32MD/32WD/32XD | (India) Durga Esha Kandrapu | (Switzerland) Azkya Aliefa Ruhanda |
| 19 October | Hellas International: Dates: 20–23 October; Host: Pyrgos, Greece; Venue: Pyrgos Indoor Hall; Level: Future Series; Format: 32MS/32WS/32MD/32WD/32XD | Score: 21–13, 21–9 | |
| 19 October | Hellas International: Dates: 20–23 October; Host: Pyrgos, Greece; Venue: Pyrgos Indoor Hall; Level: Future Series; Format: 32MS/32WS/32MD/32WD/32XD | (Lithuania) Danielius Beržanskis (Lithuania) Domas Paksys | (Denmark) Christopher Vittoriani (Denmark) Nickolai Sheng Zhang |
| 19 October | Hellas International: Dates: 20–23 October; Host: Pyrgos, Greece; Venue: Pyrgos Indoor Hall; Level: Future Series; Format: 32MS/32WS/32MD/32WD/32XD | Score: Walkover | |
| 19 October | Hellas International: Dates: 20–23 October; Host: Pyrgos, Greece; Venue: Pyrgos Indoor Hall; Level: Future Series; Format: 32MS/32WS/32MD/32WD/32XD | (Denmark) Emma Jonassen (Denmark) Marie Viscovich | (Individual Neutral Athletes) Maryna Yanbayeva (Individual Neutral Athletes) Sofiya Yanouskaya |
| 19 October | Hellas International: Dates: 20–23 October; Host: Pyrgos, Greece; Venue: Pyrgos Indoor Hall; Level: Future Series; Format: 32MS/32WS/32MD/32WD/32XD | Score: 21–14, 21–12 | |
| 19 October | Hellas International: Dates: 20–23 October; Host: Pyrgos, Greece; Venue: Pyrgos Indoor Hall; Level: Future Series; Format: 32MS/32WS/32MD/32WD/32XD | (Republic of Ireland) Scott Guildea (Republic of Ireland) Rachael Darragh | (Switzerland) Nils Harzenmoser (Switzerland) Anic Metzger |
| 19 October | Hellas International: Dates: 20–23 October; Host: Pyrgos, Greece; Venue: Pyrgos Indoor Hall; Level: Future Series; Format: 32MS/32WS/32MD/32WD/32XD | Score: 21–15, 21–19 | |
| 19 October | Peru International Challenge: Dates: 21–25 October; Host: Lima, Peru; Venue: Polideportivo Car Videna; Level: International Challenge; Prize: $20,000; Format: 32MS/32WS/32MD/16WD/32XD | (Croatia) Aria Dinata | (Brazil) Jonathan Matias |
| 19 October | Peru International Challenge: Dates: 21–25 October; Host: Lima, Peru; Venue: Polideportivo Car Videna; Level: International Challenge; Prize: $20,000; Format: 32MS/32WS/32MD/16WD/32XD | Score: 21–18, 17–21, 21–18 | |
| 19 October | Peru International Challenge: Dates: 21–25 October; Host: Lima, Peru; Venue: Polideportivo Car Videna; Level: International Challenge; Prize: $20,000; Format: 32MS/32WS/32MD/16WD/32XD | (United States) Ella Lin | (United States) Ishika Jaiswal |
| 19 October | Peru International Challenge: Dates: 21–25 October; Host: Lima, Peru; Venue: Polideportivo Car Videna; Level: International Challenge; Prize: $20,000; Format: 32MS/32WS/32MD/16WD/32XD | Score: 19–21, 21–16, 21–9 | |
| 19 October | Peru International Challenge: Dates: 21–25 October; Host: Lima, Peru; Venue: Polideportivo Car Videna; Level: International Challenge; Prize: $20,000; Format: 32MS/32WS/32MD/16WD/32XD | (Brazil) Fabrício Farias (Brazil) Davi Silva | (Canada) Kevin Lee (Canada) Ty Alexander Lindeman |
| 19 October | Peru International Challenge: Dates: 21–25 October; Host: Lima, Peru; Venue: Polideportivo Car Videna; Level: International Challenge; Prize: $20,000; Format: 32MS/32WS/32MD/16WD/32XD | Score: 21–18, 18–21, 21–15 | |
| 19 October | Peru International Challenge: Dates: 21–25 October; Host: Lima, Peru; Venue: Polideportivo Car Videna; Level: International Challenge; Prize: $20,000; Format: 32MS/32WS/32MD/16WD/32XD | (Canada) Jackie Dent (Canada) Crystal Lai | (Japan) Mihane Endo (Japan) Natsumi Takasaki |
| 19 October | Peru International Challenge: Dates: 21–25 October; Host: Lima, Peru; Venue: Polideportivo Car Videna; Level: International Challenge; Prize: $20,000; Format: 32MS/32WS/32MD/16WD/32XD | Score: 21–19, 21–15 | |
| 19 October | Peru International Challenge: Dates: 21–25 October; Host: Lima, Peru; Venue: Polideportivo Car Videna; Level: International Challenge; Prize: $20,000; Format: 32MS/32WS/32MD/16WD/32XD | (Algeria) Koceila Mammeri (Algeria) Tanina Mammeri | (Canada) Jonathan Lai (Canada) Crystal Lai |
| 19 October | Peru International Challenge: Dates: 21–25 October; Host: Lima, Peru; Venue: Polideportivo Car Videna; Level: International Challenge; Prize: $20,000; Format: 32MS/32WS/32MD/16WD/32XD | Score: 21–18, 18–21, 21–15 | |
| 26 October | Hylo Open (Draw): Dates: 27 October – 1 November; Host: Saarbrücken, Germany; Venue: Saarlandhalle; Level: Super 500; Prize: $500,000; Format: 32MS/32WS/32MD/32WD/32XD | (India) Lakshya Sen | (Indonesia) Jonatan Christie |
| 26 October | Hylo Open (Draw): Dates: 27 October – 1 November; Host: Saarbrücken, Germany; Venue: Saarlandhalle; Level: Super 500; Prize: $500,000; Format: 32MS/32WS/32MD/32WD/32XD | Score: 21–17, 21–10 | |
| 26 October | Hylo Open (Draw): Dates: 27 October – 1 November; Host: Saarbrücken, Germany; Venue: Saarlandhalle; Level: Super 500; Prize: $500,000; Format: 32MS/32WS/32MD/32WD/32XD | (India) P. V. Sindhu | (Denmark) Line Kjærsfeldt |
| 26 October | Hylo Open (Draw): Dates: 27 October – 1 November; Host: Saarbrücken, Germany; Venue: Saarlandhalle; Level: Super 500; Prize: $500,000; Format: 32MS/32WS/32MD/32WD/32XD | Score: 21–12, 21–14 | |
| 26 October | Hylo Open (Draw): Dates: 27 October – 1 November; Host: Saarbrücken, Germany; Venue: Saarlandhalle; Level: Super 500; Prize: $500,000; Format: 32MS/32WS/32MD/32WD/32XD | (Denmark) Christian Faust Kjær (Denmark) Rasmus Kjær | (England) Ben Lane (England) Sean Vendy |
| 26 October | Hylo Open (Draw): Dates: 27 October – 1 November; Host: Saarbrücken, Germany; Venue: Saarlandhalle; Level: Super 500; Prize: $500,000; Format: 32MS/32WS/32MD/32WD/32XD | Score: 21–14, 21–18 | |
| 26 October | Hylo Open (Draw): Dates: 27 October – 1 November; Host: Saarbrücken, Germany; Venue: Saarlandhalle; Level: Super 500; Prize: $500,000; Format: 32MS/32WS/32MD/32WD/32XD | (Indonesia) Amallia Cahaya Pratiwi (Indonesia) Siti Fadia Silva Ramadhanti | (Chinese Taipei) Hsu Yin-hui (Chinese Taipei) Lin Jhih-yun |
| 26 October | Hylo Open (Draw): Dates: 27 October – 1 November; Host: Saarbrücken, Germany; Venue: Saarlandhalle; Level: Super 500; Prize: $500,000; Format: 32MS/32WS/32MD/32WD/32XD | Score: 21–18, 21–19 | |
| 26 October | Hylo Open (Draw): Dates: 27 October – 1 November; Host: Saarbrücken, Germany; Venue: Saarlandhalle; Level: Super 500; Prize: $500,000; Format: 32MS/32WS/32MD/32WD/32XD | (France) Thom Gicquel (France) Delphine Delrue | (Denmark) Jesper Toft (Denmark) Amalie Cecilie Kudsk |
| 26 October | Hylo Open (Draw): Dates: 27 October – 1 November; Host: Saarbrücken, Germany; Venue: Saarlandhalle; Level: Super 500; Prize: $500,000; Format: 32MS/32WS/32MD/32WD/32XD | Score: 19–21, 22–20, 21–18 | |
| 26 October | India International (Bengaluru): Dates: 27 October – 1 November; Host: Bengaluru, India; Venue: Badminton Hall Karnataka; Level: International Challenge; Prize: $25,000; Format: 64MS/64WS/32MD/32WD/32XD | (India) Sathish Karunakaran | (India) Tankara Gnana Dattu Talasila |
| 26 October | India International (Bengaluru): Dates: 27 October – 1 November; Host: Bengaluru, India; Venue: Badminton Hall Karnataka; Level: International Challenge; Prize: $25,000; Format: 64MS/64WS/32MD/32WD/32XD | Score: 21–9, 23–21 | |
| 26 October | India International (Bengaluru): Dates: 27 October – 1 November; Host: Bengaluru, India; Venue: Badminton Hall Karnataka; Level: International Challenge; Prize: $25,000; Format: 64MS/64WS/32MD/32WD/32XD | (Thailand) Yataweemin Ketklieng | (India) Dianka Waldia |
| 26 October | India International (Bengaluru): Dates: 27 October – 1 November; Host: Bengaluru, India; Venue: Badminton Hall Karnataka; Level: International Challenge; Prize: $25,000; Format: 64MS/64WS/32MD/32WD/32XD | Score: 21–11, 21–10 | |
| 26 October | India International (Bengaluru): Dates: 27 October – 1 November; Host: Bengaluru, India; Venue: Badminton Hall Karnataka; Level: International Challenge; Prize: $25,000; Format: 64MS/64WS/32MD/32WD/32XD | (India) Sai Pratheek K. (India) Ruban Kumar | (Malaysia) Lau Yi Sheng (Malaysia) Lee Yi Bo |
| 26 October | India International (Bengaluru): Dates: 27 October – 1 November; Host: Bengaluru, India; Venue: Badminton Hall Karnataka; Level: International Challenge; Prize: $25,000; Format: 64MS/64WS/32MD/32WD/32XD | Score: 21–15, 21–19 | |
| 26 October | India International (Bengaluru): Dates: 27 October – 1 November; Host: Bengaluru, India; Venue: Badminton Hall Karnataka; Level: International Challenge; Prize: $25,000; Format: 64MS/64WS/32MD/32WD/32XD | (Japan) Mei Sudo (Japan) Mai Tanabe | (India) Ashwini Bhat K. (India) Shikha Gautam |
| 26 October | India International (Bengaluru): Dates: 27 October – 1 November; Host: Bengaluru, India; Venue: Badminton Hall Karnataka; Level: International Challenge; Prize: $25,000; Format: 64MS/64WS/32MD/32WD/32XD | Score: 21–13, 13–21, 21–19 | |
| 26 October | India International (Bengaluru): Dates: 27 October – 1 November; Host: Bengaluru, India; Venue: Badminton Hall Karnataka; Level: International Challenge; Prize: $25,000; Format: 64MS/64WS/32MD/32WD/32XD | (Individual Neutral Athletes) Rodion Alimov (Individual Neutral Athletes) Alina Davletova | (India) C Lalramsanga (India) Angel Punera |
| 26 October | India International (Bengaluru): Dates: 27 October – 1 November; Host: Bengaluru, India; Venue: Badminton Hall Karnataka; Level: International Challenge; Prize: $25,000; Format: 64MS/64WS/32MD/32WD/32XD | Score: 21–12, 21–14 | |
| 26 October | Qatar Future Series (cancelled): Dates: 27–31 October; Host: Doha, Qatar; Venue: Khalifa International Sports Complex; Level: Future Series; Format: 32MS/32WS/32MD/16WD/32XD | | |
| 26 October | Qatar Future Series (cancelled): Dates: 27–31 October; Host: Doha, Qatar; Venue: Khalifa International Sports Complex; Level: Future Series; Format: 32MS/32WS/32MD/16WD/32XD | Score: | |
| 26 October | Qatar Future Series (cancelled): Dates: 27–31 October; Host: Doha, Qatar; Venue: Khalifa International Sports Complex; Level: Future Series; Format: 32MS/32WS/32MD/16WD/32XD | Score: | |
| 26 October | Qatar Future Series (cancelled): Dates: 27–31 October; Host: Doha, Qatar; Venue: Khalifa International Sports Complex; Level: Future Series; Format: 32MS/32WS/32MD/16WD/32XD | Score: | |
| 26 October | Qatar Future Series (cancelled): Dates: 27–31 October; Host: Doha, Qatar; Venue: Khalifa International Sports Complex; Level: Future Series; Format: 32MS/32WS/32MD/16WD/32XD | Score: | |
| 26 October | Qatar Future Series (cancelled): Dates: 27–31 October; Host: Doha, Qatar; Venue: Khalifa International Sports Complex; Level: Future Series; Format: 32MS/32WS/32MD/16WD/32XD | Score: | |
| 26 October | Hungarian International: Dates: 28–31 October; Host: Budapest, Hungary; Venue: Vasas Sportcsarnok; Level: International Series; Prize: $10,000; Format: 32MS/32WS/32MD/32WD/32XD | (Denmark) Mathias Solgaard | (Denmark) Mikkel Langemark |
| 26 October | Hungarian International: Dates: 28–31 October; Host: Budapest, Hungary; Venue: Vasas Sportcsarnok; Level: International Series; Prize: $10,000; Format: 32MS/32WS/32MD/32WD/32XD | Score: 21–15, 21–17 | |
| 26 October | Hungarian International: Dates: 28–31 October; Host: Budapest, Hungary; Venue: Vasas Sportcsarnok; Level: International Series; Prize: $10,000; Format: 32MS/32WS/32MD/32WD/32XD | (Switzerland) Milena Schnider | (Finland) Nella Nyqvist |
| 26 October | Hungarian International: Dates: 28–31 October; Host: Budapest, Hungary; Venue: Vasas Sportcsarnok; Level: International Series; Prize: $10,000; Format: 32MS/32WS/32MD/32WD/32XD | Score: Walkover | |
| 26 October | Hungarian International: Dates: 28–31 October; Host: Budapest, Hungary; Venue: Vasas Sportcsarnok; Level: International Series; Prize: $10,000; Format: 32MS/32WS/32MD/32WD/32XD | (Serbia) Viktor Petrovic (Serbia) Mihajlo Tomić | (Sweden) Jakob Ekman (Sweden) Oscar Reuterhäll |
| 26 October | Hungarian International: Dates: 28–31 October; Host: Budapest, Hungary; Venue: Vasas Sportcsarnok; Level: International Series; Prize: $10,000; Format: 32MS/32WS/32MD/32WD/32XD | Score: 20–22, 21–17, 21–19 | |
| 26 October | Hungarian International: Dates: 28–31 October; Host: Budapest, Hungary; Venue: Vasas Sportcsarnok; Level: International Series; Prize: $10,000; Format: 32MS/32WS/32MD/32WD/32XD | (Germany) Leona Michalski (Denmark) Signe Schulz | (United Arab Emirates) Mysha Omer Khan (United Arab Emirates) Taabia Khan |
| 26 October | Hungarian International: Dates: 28–31 October; Host: Budapest, Hungary; Venue: Vasas Sportcsarnok; Level: International Series; Prize: $10,000; Format: 32MS/32WS/32MD/32WD/32XD | Score: 21–13, 21–12 | |
| 26 October | Hungarian International: Dates: 28–31 October; Host: Budapest, Hungary; Venue: Vasas Sportcsarnok; Level: International Series; Prize: $10,000; Format: 32MS/32WS/32MD/32WD/32XD | (Serbia) Mihajlo Tomić (Serbia) Anđela Vitman | (Sweden) Max Svensson (Sweden) Sofia Strömvall |
| 26 October | Hungarian International: Dates: 28–31 October; Host: Budapest, Hungary; Venue: Vasas Sportcsarnok; Level: International Series; Prize: $10,000; Format: 32MS/32WS/32MD/32WD/32XD | Score: 17–21, 21–19, 21–14 | |
| 26 October | Mexican International: Dates: 28 October – 1 November; Host: Oaxtepec, Mexico; Venue: Dorados Conventions & Resort; Level: International Series; Prize: $10,000; Format: 32MS/16WS/16MD/8WD/4XD | (United States) Jay Chun | (Italy) Fabio Caponio |
| 26 October | Mexican International: Dates: 28 October – 1 November; Host: Oaxtepec, Mexico; Venue: Dorados Conventions & Resort; Level: International Series; Prize: $10,000; Format: 32MS/16WS/16MD/8WD/4XD | Score: 15–21, 21–19, 21–16 | |
| 26 October | Mexican International: Dates: 28 October – 1 November; Host: Oaxtepec, Mexico; Venue: Dorados Conventions & Resort; Level: International Series; Prize: $10,000; Format: 32MS/16WS/16MD/8WD/4XD | (Chinese Taipei) Lee Yu-hsuan | (Czech Republic) Sharleen van Coppenolle |
| 26 October | Mexican International: Dates: 28 October – 1 November; Host: Oaxtepec, Mexico; Venue: Dorados Conventions & Resort; Level: International Series; Prize: $10,000; Format: 32MS/16WS/16MD/8WD/4XD | Score: 21–16, 21–17 | |
| 26 October | Mexican International: Dates: 28 October – 1 November; Host: Oaxtepec, Mexico; Venue: Dorados Conventions & Resort; Level: International Series; Prize: $10,000; Format: 32MS/16WS/16MD/8WD/4XD | (Mexico) Armando Gaitán (Mexico) Juan Torres | (Guatemala) Yeison del Cid (Guatemala) Christopher Martínez |
| 26 October | Mexican International: Dates: 28 October – 1 November; Host: Oaxtepec, Mexico; Venue: Dorados Conventions & Resort; Level: International Series; Prize: $10,000; Format: 32MS/16WS/16MD/8WD/4XD | Score: 21–16, 21–14 | |
| 26 October | Mexican International: Dates: 28 October – 1 November; Host: Oaxtepec, Mexico; Venue: Dorados Conventions & Resort; Level: International Series; Prize: $10,000; Format: 32MS/16WS/16MD/8WD/4XD | (Chinese Taipei) Hsieh Chih-ying (Chinese Taipei) Lee Yu-hsuan | (Mexico) Romina Fregoso (Mexico) Miriam Rodríguez |
| 26 October | Mexican International: Dates: 28 October – 1 November; Host: Oaxtepec, Mexico; Venue: Dorados Conventions & Resort; Level: International Series; Prize: $10,000; Format: 32MS/16WS/16MD/8WD/4XD | Score: 21–15, 22–20 | |
| 26 October | Mexican International: Dates: 28 October – 1 November; Host: Oaxtepec, Mexico; Venue: Dorados Conventions & Resort; Level: International Series; Prize: $10,000; Format: 32MS/16WS/16MD/8WD/4XD | (Mexico) Luis Montoya (Mexico) Miriam Rodríguez | (Mexico) Emiliano Carrera (Mexico) Sofia Ruiz Toledo |
| 26 October | Mexican International: Dates: 28 October – 1 November; Host: Oaxtepec, Mexico; Venue: Dorados Conventions & Resort; Level: International Series; Prize: $10,000; Format: 32MS/16WS/16MD/8WD/4XD | Score: 21–7, 21–12 | |

=== November ===
| Week commencing | Tournament | Champions | Runners-up |
|---|---|---|---|
| 2 November | Korea Open (Draw): Dates: 3–8 November; Host: Yeosu, Korea; Venue: Jinnam Stadium; Level: Super 500; Prize: $500,000; Format: 32MS/32WS/32MD/32WD/32XD | (Canada) Victor Lai | (Hong Kong) Jason Gunawan |
| 2 November | Korea Open (Draw): Dates: 3–8 November; Host: Yeosu, Korea; Venue: Jinnam Stadium; Level: Super 500; Prize: $500,000; Format: 32MS/32WS/32MD/32WD/32XD | Score: 21–11, 21–14 | |
| 2 November | Korea Open (Draw): Dates: 3–8 November; Host: Yeosu, Korea; Venue: Jinnam Stadium; Level: Super 500; Prize: $500,000; Format: 32MS/32WS/32MD/32WD/32XD | (South Korea) An Se-young | (Japan) Akane Yamaguchi |
| 2 November | Korea Open (Draw): Dates: 3–8 November; Host: Yeosu, Korea; Venue: Jinnam Stadium; Level: Super 500; Prize: $500,000; Format: 32MS/32WS/32MD/32WD/32XD | Score: 21–12, 15–21, 21–16 | |
| 2 November | Korea Open (Draw): Dates: 3–8 November; Host: Yeosu, Korea; Venue: Jinnam Stadium; Level: Super 500; Prize: $500,000; Format: 32MS/32WS/32MD/32WD/32XD | (South Korea) Kim Won-ho (South Korea) Seo Seung-jae | (Japan) Takuro Hoki (Japan) Yugo Kobayashi |
| 2 November | Korea Open (Draw): Dates: 3–8 November; Host: Yeosu, Korea; Venue: Jinnam Stadium; Level: Super 500; Prize: $500,000; Format: 32MS/32WS/32MD/32WD/32XD | Score: 21–12, 20–22, 21–19 | |
| 2 November | Korea Open (Draw): Dates: 3–8 November; Host: Yeosu, Korea; Venue: Jinnam Stadium; Level: Super 500; Prize: $500,000; Format: 32MS/32WS/32MD/32WD/32XD | (Japan) Rui Hirokami (Japan) Sayaka Hobara | (South Korea) Kim Yu-jung (South Korea) Lee Yu-lim |
| 2 November | Korea Open (Draw): Dates: 3–8 November; Host: Yeosu, Korea; Venue: Jinnam Stadium; Level: Super 500; Prize: $500,000; Format: 32MS/32WS/32MD/32WD/32XD | Score: 21–18, 21–18 | |
| 2 November | Korea Open (Draw): Dates: 3–8 November; Host: Yeosu, Korea; Venue: Jinnam Stadium; Level: Super 500; Prize: $500,000; Format: 32MS/32WS/32MD/32WD/32XD | (China) Jiang Zhenbang (China) Wei Yaxin | (China) Gao Jiaxuan (China) Wu Mengying |
| 2 November | Korea Open (Draw): Dates: 3–8 November; Host: Yeosu, Korea; Venue: Jinnam Stadium; Level: Super 500; Prize: $500,000; Format: 32MS/32WS/32MD/32WD/32XD | Score: 21–16, 21–13 | |
| 2 November | China International Challenge: Dates: 3–8 November; Host: Nan'an, Fujian, China; Venue: Wang Wenjiao Badminton Hall; Level: International Challenge; Prize: $20,000; Format: 64MS/32WS/32MD/32WD/32XD | (China) Sun Chao | (China) Wu Zisheng |
| 2 November | China International Challenge: Dates: 3–8 November; Host: Nan'an, Fujian, China; Venue: Wang Wenjiao Badminton Hall; Level: International Challenge; Prize: $20,000; Format: 64MS/32WS/32MD/32WD/32XD | Score: 21–10, 21–15 | |
| 2 November | China International Challenge: Dates: 3–8 November; Host: Nan'an, Fujian, China; Venue: Wang Wenjiao Badminton Hall; Level: International Challenge; Prize: $20,000; Format: 64MS/32WS/32MD/32WD/32XD | (China) Chen Xintong | (China) Xu Tengti |
| 2 November | China International Challenge: Dates: 3–8 November; Host: Nan'an, Fujian, China; Venue: Wang Wenjiao Badminton Hall; Level: International Challenge; Prize: $20,000; Format: 64MS/32WS/32MD/32WD/32XD | Score: 21–10, 21–17 | |
| 2 November | China International Challenge: Dates: 3–8 November; Host: Nan'an, Fujian, China; Venue: Wang Wenjiao Badminton Hall; Level: International Challenge; Prize: $20,000; Format: 64MS/32WS/32MD/32WD/32XD | (China) Chen Junting (China) Huang Di | (China) Feng Yilang (China) Wei Jianzhen |
| 2 November | China International Challenge: Dates: 3–8 November; Host: Nan'an, Fujian, China; Venue: Wang Wenjiao Badminton Hall; Level: International Challenge; Prize: $20,000; Format: 64MS/32WS/32MD/32WD/32XD | Score: 21–10, 21–7 | |
| 2 November | China International Challenge: Dates: 3–8 November; Host: Nan'an, Fujian, China; Venue: Wang Wenjiao Badminton Hall; Level: International Challenge; Prize: $20,000; Format: 64MS/32WS/32MD/32WD/32XD | (China) Liu Jiayue (China) Wang Zimeng | (China) Ding Keyun (China) Li Huazhou |
| 2 November | China International Challenge: Dates: 3–8 November; Host: Nan'an, Fujian, China; Venue: Wang Wenjiao Badminton Hall; Level: International Challenge; Prize: $20,000; Format: 64MS/32WS/32MD/32WD/32XD | Score: 21–11, 21–19 | |
| 2 November | China International Challenge: Dates: 3–8 November; Host: Nan'an, Fujian, China; Venue: Wang Wenjiao Badminton Hall; Level: International Challenge; Prize: $20,000; Format: 64MS/32WS/32MD/32WD/32XD | (China) Liao Pinyi (China) Zhang Jiahan | (China) Ma Xixiang (China) Qin Huizhi |
| 2 November | China International Challenge: Dates: 3–8 November; Host: Nan'an, Fujian, China; Venue: Wang Wenjiao Badminton Hall; Level: International Challenge; Prize: $20,000; Format: 64MS/32WS/32MD/32WD/32XD | Score: 21–14, 21–16 | |
| 2 November | India International (Hyderabad): Dates: 3–8 November; Host: Hyderabad, Telangana, India; Venue: Gachibowli Indoor Stadium; Level: International Challenge; Prize: $25,000; Format: 64MS/64WS/32MD/32WD/32XD | (India) Tushar Suveer | (India) Bharat Raghav |
| 2 November | India International (Hyderabad): Dates: 3–8 November; Host: Hyderabad, Telangana, India; Venue: Gachibowli Indoor Stadium; Level: International Challenge; Prize: $25,000; Format: 64MS/64WS/32MD/32WD/32XD | Score: 15–21, 21–18, 21–19 | |
| 2 November | India International (Hyderabad): Dates: 3–8 November; Host: Hyderabad, Telangana, India; Venue: Gachibowli Indoor Stadium; Level: International Challenge; Prize: $25,000; Format: 64MS/64WS/32MD/32WD/32XD | (India) Rakshitha Ramraj | (India) Rujula Ramu |
| 2 November | India International (Hyderabad): Dates: 3–8 November; Host: Hyderabad, Telangana, India; Venue: Gachibowli Indoor Stadium; Level: International Challenge; Prize: $25,000; Format: 64MS/64WS/32MD/32WD/32XD | Score: 16–21, 21–15, 21–14 | |
| 2 November | India International (Hyderabad): Dates: 3–8 November; Host: Hyderabad, Telangana, India; Venue: Gachibowli Indoor Stadium; Level: International Challenge; Prize: $25,000; Format: 64MS/64WS/32MD/32WD/32XD | (India) Krishna Prasad Garaga (India) Pruthvi Roy | (India) Sai Pratheek K. (India) Ruban Kumar |
| 2 November | India International (Hyderabad): Dates: 3–8 November; Host: Hyderabad, Telangana, India; Venue: Gachibowli Indoor Stadium; Level: International Challenge; Prize: $25,000; Format: 64MS/64WS/32MD/32WD/32XD | Score: 21–12, 21–18 | |
| 2 November | India International (Hyderabad): Dates: 3–8 November; Host: Hyderabad, Telangana, India; Venue: Gachibowli Indoor Stadium; Level: International Challenge; Prize: $25,000; Format: 64MS/64WS/32MD/32WD/32XD | (Japan) Mei Sudo (Japan) Mai Tanabe | (Thailand) Phattharin Aiamvareesrisakul (Thailand) Sarisa Janpeng |
| 2 November | India International (Hyderabad): Dates: 3–8 November; Host: Hyderabad, Telangana, India; Venue: Gachibowli Indoor Stadium; Level: International Challenge; Prize: $25,000; Format: 64MS/64WS/32MD/32WD/32XD | Score: 21–11, 21–11 | |
| 2 November | India International (Hyderabad): Dates: 3–8 November; Host: Hyderabad, Telangana, India; Venue: Gachibowli Indoor Stadium; Level: International Challenge; Prize: $25,000; Format: 64MS/64WS/32MD/32WD/32XD | (Individual Neutral Athletes) Rodion Alimov (Individual Neutral Athletes) Alina Davletova | (India) Sathish Karunakaran (India) Ashwini Ponnappa |
| 2 November | India International (Hyderabad): Dates: 3–8 November; Host: Hyderabad, Telangana, India; Venue: Gachibowli Indoor Stadium; Level: International Challenge; Prize: $25,000; Format: 64MS/64WS/32MD/32WD/32XD | Score: 19–21, 21–11, 21–13 | |
| 2 November | Guyana International (cancelled): Dates: 3–7 November; Host: Georgetown, Guyana; Venue: Guyana National Gymnasium; Level: Future Series; Format: | | |
| 2 November | Guyana International (cancelled): Dates: 3–7 November; Host: Georgetown, Guyana; Venue: Guyana National Gymnasium; Level: Future Series; Format: | Score: | |
| 2 November | Guyana International (cancelled): Dates: 3–7 November; Host: Georgetown, Guyana; Venue: Guyana National Gymnasium; Level: Future Series; Format: | Score: | |
| 2 November | Guyana International (cancelled): Dates: 3–7 November; Host: Georgetown, Guyana; Venue: Guyana National Gymnasium; Level: Future Series; Format: | Score: | |
| 2 November | Guyana International (cancelled): Dates: 3–7 November; Host: Georgetown, Guyana; Venue: Guyana National Gymnasium; Level: Future Series; Format: | Score: | |
| 2 November | Guyana International (cancelled): Dates: 3–7 November; Host: Georgetown, Guyana; Venue: Guyana National Gymnasium; Level: Future Series; Format: | Score: | |
| 2 November | Norwegian International: Dates: 5–8 November; Host: Sandefjord, Norway; Venue: Jotunhallen; Level: International Series; Prize: $5,000; Format: 32MS/32WS/32MD/32WD/32XD | (Denmark) Mathias Solgaard | (Denmark) Alexander Ringbæk |
| 2 November | Norwegian International: Dates: 5–8 November; Host: Sandefjord, Norway; Venue: Jotunhallen; Level: International Series; Prize: $5,000; Format: 32MS/32WS/32MD/32WD/32XD | Score: 21–12, 21–15 | |
| 2 November | Norwegian International: Dates: 5–8 November; Host: Sandefjord, Norway; Venue: Jotunhallen; Level: International Series; Prize: $5,000; Format: 32MS/32WS/32MD/32WD/32XD | (Denmark) Laura Fløj Thomsen | (Indonesia) Irdina Naurah Mirza |
| 2 November | Norwegian International: Dates: 5–8 November; Host: Sandefjord, Norway; Venue: Jotunhallen; Level: International Series; Prize: $5,000; Format: 32MS/32WS/32MD/32WD/32XD | Score: 21–16, 21–18 | |
| 2 November | Norwegian International: Dates: 5–8 November; Host: Sandefjord, Norway; Venue: Jotunhallen; Level: International Series; Prize: $5,000; Format: 32MS/32WS/32MD/32WD/32XD | (Denmark) Mikkel Eilersen Bouet (Denmark) Oliver Geisler | (Finland) Juha Honkanen (Finland) Jesper Paul |
| 2 November | Norwegian International: Dates: 5–8 November; Host: Sandefjord, Norway; Venue: Jotunhallen; Level: International Series; Prize: $5,000; Format: 32MS/32WS/32MD/32WD/32XD | Score: 21–12, 21–14 | |
| 2 November | Norwegian International: Dates: 5–8 November; Host: Sandefjord, Norway; Venue: Jotunhallen; Level: International Series; Prize: $5,000; Format: 32MS/32WS/32MD/32WD/32XD | (Denmark) Maria Søgård Andersen (Denmark) Rebecca Thorup | (Denmark) Emma Jonassen (Denmark) Marie Viscovich |
| 2 November | Norwegian International: Dates: 5–8 November; Host: Sandefjord, Norway; Venue: Jotunhallen; Level: International Series; Prize: $5,000; Format: 32MS/32WS/32MD/32WD/32XD | Score: 21–15, 21–16 | |
| 2 November | Norwegian International: Dates: 5–8 November; Host: Sandefjord, Norway; Venue: Jotunhallen; Level: International Series; Prize: $5,000; Format: 32MS/32WS/32MD/32WD/32XD | (Finland) Ananda Galvani Daniswara (Estonia) Elisaveta Berik | (Denmark) Tobias Rønbøg (Denmark) Maria Søgård Andersen |
| 2 November | Norwegian International: Dates: 5–8 November; Host: Sandefjord, Norway; Venue: Jotunhallen; Level: International Series; Prize: $5,000; Format: 32MS/32WS/32MD/32WD/32XD | Score: 19–21, 21–17, 21–11 | |
| 9 November | Japan Masters (Draw): Dates: 10–15 November; Host: Kumamoto, Japan; Venue: Kumamoto Prefectural Gymnasium; Level: Super 500; Prize: $500,000; Format: 32MS/32WS/32MD/32WD/32XD | (India) Lakshya Sen | (Japan) Koki Watanabe |
| 9 November | Japan Masters (Draw): Dates: 10–15 November; Host: Kumamoto, Japan; Venue: Kumamoto Prefectural Gymnasium; Level: Super 500; Prize: $500,000; Format: 32MS/32WS/32MD/32WD/32XD | Score: 13–21, 21–18, 21–14 | |
| 9 November | Japan Masters (Draw): Dates: 10–15 November; Host: Kumamoto, Japan; Venue: Kumamoto Prefectural Gymnasium; Level: Super 500; Prize: $500,000; Format: 32MS/32WS/32MD/32WD/32XD | (Japan) Akane Yamaguchi | (China) Wang Zhiyi |
| 9 November | Japan Masters (Draw): Dates: 10–15 November; Host: Kumamoto, Japan; Venue: Kumamoto Prefectural Gymnasium; Level: Super 500; Prize: $500,000; Format: 32MS/32WS/32MD/32WD/32XD | Score: 21–14, 22–20 | |
| 9 November | Japan Masters (Draw): Dates: 10–15 November; Host: Kumamoto, Japan; Venue: Kumamoto Prefectural Gymnasium; Level: Super 500; Prize: $500,000; Format: 32MS/32WS/32MD/32WD/32XD | (Malaysia) Aaron Tai (Malaysia) Yap Roy King | (Japan) Takuro Hoki (Japan) Yugo Kobayashi |
| 9 November | Japan Masters (Draw): Dates: 10–15 November; Host: Kumamoto, Japan; Venue: Kumamoto Prefectural Gymnasium; Level: Super 500; Prize: $500,000; Format: 32MS/32WS/32MD/32WD/32XD | Score: 16–21, 21–13, 21–15 | |
| 9 November | Japan Masters (Draw): Dates: 10–15 November; Host: Kumamoto, Japan; Venue: Kumamoto Prefectural Gymnasium; Level: Super 500; Prize: $500,000; Format: 32MS/32WS/32MD/32WD/32XD | (Japan) Rin Iwanaga (Japan) Kie Nakanishi | (Japan) Ririna Hiramoto (Japan) Chiharu Shida |
| 9 November | Japan Masters (Draw): Dates: 10–15 November; Host: Kumamoto, Japan; Venue: Kumamoto Prefectural Gymnasium; Level: Super 500; Prize: $500,000; Format: 32MS/32WS/32MD/32WD/32XD | Score: 21–19, 21–15 | |
| 9 November | Japan Masters (Draw): Dates: 10–15 November; Host: Kumamoto, Japan; Venue: Kumamoto Prefectural Gymnasium; Level: Super 500; Prize: $500,000; Format: 32MS/32WS/32MD/32WD/32XD | (China) Jiang Zhenbang (China) Wei Yaxin | (China) Gao Jiaxuan (China) Wu Mengying |
| 9 November | Japan Masters (Draw): Dates: 10–15 November; Host: Kumamoto, Japan; Venue: Kumamoto Prefectural Gymnasium; Level: Super 500; Prize: $500,000; Format: 32MS/32WS/32MD/32WD/32XD | Score: 15–21, 21–15, 21–14 | |
| 9 November | Kaohsiung Masters (Draw): Dates: 10–15 November; Host: Kaohsiung, Taiwan; Venue: K-Arena; Level: Super 100; Prize: $120,000; Format: 64MS/32WS/32MD/32WD/32XD | (Chinese Taipei) Kuo Kuan-lin | (South Korea) Kim Hae-deun |
| 9 November | Kaohsiung Masters (Draw): Dates: 10–15 November; Host: Kaohsiung, Taiwan; Venue: K-Arena; Level: Super 100; Prize: $120,000; Format: 64MS/32WS/32MD/32WD/32XD | Score: 21–13, 21–19 | |
| 9 November | Kaohsiung Masters (Draw): Dates: 10–15 November; Host: Kaohsiung, Taiwan; Venue: K-Arena; Level: Super 100; Prize: $120,000; Format: 64MS/32WS/32MD/32WD/32XD | (Chinese Taipei) Liao Yuan-chi | (Indonesia) Mutiara Ayu Puspitasari |
| 9 November | Kaohsiung Masters (Draw): Dates: 10–15 November; Host: Kaohsiung, Taiwan; Venue: K-Arena; Level: Super 100; Prize: $120,000; Format: 64MS/32WS/32MD/32WD/32XD | Score: 21–15, 21–13 | |
| 9 November | Kaohsiung Masters (Draw): Dates: 10–15 November; Host: Kaohsiung, Taiwan; Venue: K-Arena; Level: Super 100; Prize: $120,000; Format: 64MS/32WS/32MD/32WD/32XD | (Chinese Taipei) Chang Ko-chi (Chinese Taipei) Lu Chen | (Chinese Taipei) Cheng Kai-wen (Chinese Taipei) Liao Chao-pang |
| 9 November | Kaohsiung Masters (Draw): Dates: 10–15 November; Host: Kaohsiung, Taiwan; Venue: K-Arena; Level: Super 100; Prize: $120,000; Format: 64MS/32WS/32MD/32WD/32XD | Score: 21–18, 18–21, 21–16 | |
| 9 November | Kaohsiung Masters (Draw): Dates: 10–15 November; Host: Kaohsiung, Taiwan; Venue: K-Arena; Level: Super 100; Prize: $120,000; Format: 64MS/32WS/32MD/32WD/32XD | (Indonesia) Isyana Syahira Meida (Indonesia) Rinjani Kwinnara Nastine | (Malaysia) Ong Xin Yee (Malaysia) Carmen Ting |
| 9 November | Kaohsiung Masters (Draw): Dates: 10–15 November; Host: Kaohsiung, Taiwan; Venue: K-Arena; Level: Super 100; Prize: $120,000; Format: 64MS/32WS/32MD/32WD/32XD | Score: 21–15, 21–15 | |
| 9 November | Kaohsiung Masters (Draw): Dates: 10–15 November; Host: Kaohsiung, Taiwan; Venue: K-Arena; Level: Super 100; Prize: $120,000; Format: 64MS/32WS/32MD/32WD/32XD | (Malaysia) Wee Yee Hern (Malaysia) Vannee Gobi | (South Korea) Ki Dong-ju (South Korea) Jeong Na-eun |
| 9 November | Kaohsiung Masters (Draw): Dates: 10–15 November; Host: Kaohsiung, Taiwan; Venue: K-Arena; Level: Super 100; Prize: $120,000; Format: 64MS/32WS/32MD/32WD/32XD | Score: 24–22, 21–17 | |
| 9 November | Irish Open: Dates: 11–14 November; Host: Dublin, Republic of Ireland; Venue: National Indoor Arena; Level: International Challenge; Prize: $20,000; Format: 32MS/32WS/32MD/32WD/32XD | (Denmark) Victor Ørding Kauffmann | (South Korea) Cho Hyeon-woo |
| 9 November | Irish Open: Dates: 11–14 November; Host: Dublin, Republic of Ireland; Venue: National Indoor Arena; Level: International Challenge; Prize: $20,000; Format: 32MS/32WS/32MD/32WD/32XD | Score: 21–9, 16–21, 21–16 | |
| 9 November | Irish Open: Dates: 11–14 November; Host: Dublin, Republic of Ireland; Venue: National Indoor Arena; Level: International Challenge; Prize: $20,000; Format: 32MS/32WS/32MD/32WD/32XD | (South Korea) Kim Min-ji | (Germany) Yvonne Li |
| 9 November | Irish Open: Dates: 11–14 November; Host: Dublin, Republic of Ireland; Venue: National Indoor Arena; Level: International Challenge; Prize: $20,000; Format: 32MS/32WS/32MD/32WD/32XD | Score: 21–14, 21–13 | |
| 9 November | Irish Open: Dates: 11–14 November; Host: Dublin, Republic of Ireland; Venue: National Indoor Arena; Level: International Challenge; Prize: $20,000; Format: 32MS/32WS/32MD/32WD/32XD | (South Korea) Jin Sung-ik (South Korea) Lee Hyeong-woo | (France) Julien Maio (France) William Villeger |
| 9 November | Irish Open: Dates: 11–14 November; Host: Dublin, Republic of Ireland; Venue: National Indoor Arena; Level: International Challenge; Prize: $20,000; Format: 32MS/32WS/32MD/32WD/32XD | Score: 22–20, 11–21, 21–17 | |
| 9 November | Irish Open: Dates: 11–14 November; Host: Dublin, Republic of Ireland; Venue: National Indoor Arena; Level: International Challenge; Prize: $20,000; Format: 32MS/32WS/32MD/32WD/32XD | (South Korea) Lee Seung-hee (South Korea) Park Min-ji | (South Korea) Moon In-seo (South Korea) Park Seul |
| 9 November | Irish Open: Dates: 11–14 November; Host: Dublin, Republic of Ireland; Venue: National Indoor Arena; Level: International Challenge; Prize: $20,000; Format: 32MS/32WS/32MD/32WD/32XD | Score: 21–14, 15–21, 21–19 | |
| 9 November | Irish Open: Dates: 11–14 November; Host: Dublin, Republic of Ireland; Venue: National Indoor Arena; Level: International Challenge; Prize: $20,000; Format: 32MS/32WS/32MD/32WD/32XD | (Denmark) Jesper Toft (Denmark) Amalie Cecilie Kudsk | (South Korea) Jin Sung-ik (South Korea) Lee Seung-hee |
| 9 November | Irish Open: Dates: 11–14 November; Host: Dublin, Republic of Ireland; Venue: National Indoor Arena; Level: International Challenge; Prize: $20,000; Format: 32MS/32WS/32MD/32WD/32XD | Score: 21–17, 21–16 | |
| 9 November | South Australia International: Dates: 11–15 November; Host: Adelaide, South Australia, Australia; Venue: South Australia Badminton Arena; Level: International Series; Prize: $10,000; Format: 64MS/32WS/32MD/32WD/32XD | (Australia) Karono | (South Korea) Choi Pyeong-gang |
| 9 November | South Australia International: Dates: 11–15 November; Host: Adelaide, South Australia, Australia; Venue: South Australia Badminton Arena; Level: International Series; Prize: $10,000; Format: 64MS/32WS/32MD/32WD/32XD | Score: 21–18, 14–21, 13–3 (retired) | |
| 9 November | South Australia International: Dates: 11–15 November; Host: Adelaide, South Australia, Australia; Venue: South Australia Badminton Arena; Level: International Series; Prize: $10,000; Format: 64MS/32WS/32MD/32WD/32XD | (South Korea) Kim Do-yeon | (South Korea) Lee Da-hyun |
| 9 November | South Australia International: Dates: 11–15 November; Host: Adelaide, South Australia, Australia; Venue: South Australia Badminton Arena; Level: International Series; Prize: $10,000; Format: 64MS/32WS/32MD/32WD/32XD | Score: 17–21, 21–10, 21–12 | |
| 9 November | South Australia International: Dates: 11–15 November; Host: Adelaide, South Australia, Australia; Venue: South Australia Badminton Arena; Level: International Series; Prize: $10,000; Format: 64MS/32WS/32MD/32WD/32XD | (South Korea) Cheon Ji-min (South Korea) Park Seung-min | (South Korea) Cho Moon-hee (South Korea) Lee Yong-hee |
| 9 November | South Australia International: Dates: 11–15 November; Host: Adelaide, South Australia, Australia; Venue: South Australia Badminton Arena; Level: International Series; Prize: $10,000; Format: 64MS/32WS/32MD/32WD/32XD | Score: 21–11, 15–21, 21–14 | |
| 9 November | South Australia International: Dates: 11–15 November; Host: Adelaide, South Australia, Australia; Venue: South Australia Badminton Arena; Level: International Series; Prize: $10,000; Format: 64MS/32WS/32MD/32WD/32XD | (South Korea) Kim So-hee (South Korea) Yeon Seo-yeon | (South Korea) Jo Yoo-na (South Korea) Ko Hee-joo |
| 9 November | South Australia International: Dates: 11–15 November; Host: Adelaide, South Australia, Australia; Venue: South Australia Badminton Arena; Level: International Series; Prize: $10,000; Format: 64MS/32WS/32MD/32WD/32XD | Score: 21–6, 21–19 | |
| 9 November | South Australia International: Dates: 11–15 November; Host: Adelaide, South Australia, Australia; Venue: South Australia Badminton Arena; Level: International Series; Prize: $10,000; Format: 64MS/32WS/32MD/32WD/32XD | (South Korea) Park Seung-min (South Korea) Yeon Seo-yeon | (South Korea) Kim Sung-un (South Korea) Jo Yoo-na |
| 9 November | South Australia International: Dates: 11–15 November; Host: Adelaide, South Australia, Australia; Venue: South Australia Badminton Arena; Level: International Series; Prize: $10,000; Format: 64MS/32WS/32MD/32WD/32XD | Score: 21–15, 21–14 | |
| 9 November | Suriname International: Dates: 11–15 November; Host: Paramaribo, Suriname; Venue: Ring Sport Center; Level: International Series; Prize: $10,000; Format: 32MS/32WS/32MD/16WD/16XD | (Azerbaijan) Ade Resky Dwicahyo | (Azerbaijan) Dicky Dwi Pangestu |
| 9 November | Suriname International: Dates: 11–15 November; Host: Paramaribo, Suriname; Venue: Ring Sport Center; Level: International Series; Prize: $10,000; Format: 32MS/32WS/32MD/16WD/16XD | Score: 21–12, 21–17 | |
| 9 November | Suriname International: Dates: 11–15 November; Host: Paramaribo, Suriname; Venue: Ring Sport Center; Level: International Series; Prize: $10,000; Format: 32MS/32WS/32MD/16WD/16XD | (Azerbaijan) Keisha Fatimah Azzahra | (Peru) Inés Castillo |
| 9 November | Suriname International: Dates: 11–15 November; Host: Paramaribo, Suriname; Venue: Ring Sport Center; Level: International Series; Prize: $10,000; Format: 32MS/32WS/32MD/16WD/16XD | Score: 21–19, 20–22, 21–14 | |
| 9 November | Suriname International: Dates: 11–15 November; Host: Paramaribo, Suriname; Venue: Ring Sport Center; Level: International Series; Prize: $10,000; Format: 32MS/32WS/32MD/16WD/16XD | (Azerbaijan) Ade Resky Dwicahyo (Azerbaijan) Dicky Dwi Pangestu | (Malaysia) Andy Kok (Malaysia) Lim Yu Sheng |
| 9 November | Suriname International: Dates: 11–15 November; Host: Paramaribo, Suriname; Venue: Ring Sport Center; Level: International Series; Prize: $10,000; Format: 32MS/32WS/32MD/16WD/16XD | Score: 21–8, 21–10 | |
| 9 November | Suriname International: Dates: 11–15 November; Host: Paramaribo, Suriname; Venue: Ring Sport Center; Level: International Series; Prize: $10,000; Format: 32MS/32WS/32MD/16WD/16XD | (Peru) Naomi Junco (Peru) Namie Miyahira | (Trinidad and Tobago) Aliyah Urquhart (Trinidad and Tobago) Amara Urquhart |
| 9 November | Suriname International: Dates: 11–15 November; Host: Paramaribo, Suriname; Venue: Ring Sport Center; Level: International Series; Prize: $10,000; Format: 32MS/32WS/32MD/16WD/16XD | Score: 21–8, 21–5 | |
| 9 November | Suriname International: Dates: 11–15 November; Host: Paramaribo, Suriname; Venue: Ring Sport Center; Level: International Series; Prize: $10,000; Format: 32MS/32WS/32MD/16WD/16XD | (Azerbaijan) Dicky Dwi Pangestu (Azerbaijan) Keisha Fatimah Azzahra | (Suriname) Sören Opti (Suriname) Crystal Leefmans |
| 9 November | Suriname International: Dates: 11–15 November; Host: Paramaribo, Suriname; Venue: Ring Sport Center; Level: International Series; Prize: $10,000; Format: 32MS/32WS/32MD/16WD/16XD | Score: 21–10, 21–16 | |
| 9 November | Zambia International: Dates: 12–15 November; Host: Lusaka, Zambia; Venue: OYDC – Sports Development Centre; Level: International Series; Prize: $10,000; Format: 32MS/32WS/32MD/8WD/16XD | (India) Manav Choudhary | (Kazakhstan) Dmitriy Panarin |
| 9 November | Zambia International: Dates: 12–15 November; Host: Lusaka, Zambia; Venue: OYDC – Sports Development Centre; Level: International Series; Prize: $10,000; Format: 32MS/32WS/32MD/8WD/16XD | Score: 19–21, 21–14, 22–20 | |
| 9 November | Zambia International: Dates: 12–15 November; Host: Lusaka, Zambia; Venue: OYDC – Sports Development Centre; Level: International Series; Prize: $10,000; Format: 32MS/32WS/32MD/8WD/16XD | (Myanmar) Thet Htar Thuzar | (United Arab Emirates) Nurani Ratu Azzahra |
| 9 November | Zambia International: Dates: 12–15 November; Host: Lusaka, Zambia; Venue: OYDC – Sports Development Centre; Level: International Series; Prize: $10,000; Format: 32MS/32WS/32MD/8WD/16XD | Score: 22–20, 21–7 | |
| 9 November | Zambia International: Dates: 12–15 November; Host: Lusaka, Zambia; Venue: OYDC – Sports Development Centre; Level: International Series; Prize: $10,000; Format: 32MS/32WS/32MD/8WD/16XD | (United Arab Emirates) Bharath Latheesh (United Arab Emirates) Dev Vishnu | (India) Abhyuday Choudhary (India) Ayush Makhija |
| 9 November | Zambia International: Dates: 12–15 November; Host: Lusaka, Zambia; Venue: OYDC – Sports Development Centre; Level: International Series; Prize: $10,000; Format: 32MS/32WS/32MD/8WD/16XD | Score: 21–14, 15–21, 21–12 | |
| 9 November | Zambia International: Dates: 12–15 November; Host: Lusaka, Zambia; Venue: OYDC – Sports Development Centre; Level: International Series; Prize: $10,000; Format: 32MS/32WS/32MD/8WD/16XD | (South Africa) Amy Ackerman (South Africa) Johanita Scholtz | (United Arab Emirates) Sreeyuktha Sreejith Parol (United Arab Emirates) Nayonika Rajesh |
| 9 November | Zambia International: Dates: 12–15 November; Host: Lusaka, Zambia; Venue: OYDC – Sports Development Centre; Level: International Series; Prize: $10,000; Format: 32MS/32WS/32MD/8WD/16XD | Score: 21–18, 21–14 | |
| 9 November | Zambia International: Dates: 12–15 November; Host: Lusaka, Zambia; Venue: OYDC – Sports Development Centre; Level: International Series; Prize: $10,000; Format: 32MS/32WS/32MD/8WD/16XD | (Slovenia) Miha Ivančič (Slovenia) Anja Jordan | (South Africa) Caden Kakora (South Africa) Amy Ackerman |
| 9 November | Zambia International: Dates: 12–15 November; Host: Lusaka, Zambia; Venue: OYDC – Sports Development Centre; Level: International Series; Prize: $10,000; Format: 32MS/32WS/32MD/8WD/16XD | Score: 21–18, 17–21, 21–18 | |
| 16 November | Hong Kong Open (Draw): Dates: 17–22 November; Host: Kowloon, Hong Kong; Venue: Hong Kong Coliseum; Level: Super 500; Prize: $500,000; Format: 32MS/32WS/32MD/32WD/32XD | (Denmark) Anders Antonsen | (Thailand) Kunlavut Vitidsarn |
| 16 November | Hong Kong Open (Draw): Dates: 17–22 November; Host: Kowloon, Hong Kong; Venue: Hong Kong Coliseum; Level: Super 500; Prize: $500,000; Format: 32MS/32WS/32MD/32WD/32XD | Score: Walkover | |
| 16 November | Hong Kong Open (Draw): Dates: 17–22 November; Host: Kowloon, Hong Kong; Venue: Hong Kong Coliseum; Level: Super 500; Prize: $500,000; Format: 32MS/32WS/32MD/32WD/32XD | (China) Wang Zhiyi | (Thailand) Pornpawee Chochuwong |
| 16 November | Hong Kong Open (Draw): Dates: 17–22 November; Host: Kowloon, Hong Kong; Venue: Hong Kong Coliseum; Level: Super 500; Prize: $500,000; Format: 32MS/32WS/32MD/32WD/32XD | Score: 21–16, 21–11 | |
| 16 November | Hong Kong Open (Draw): Dates: 17–22 November; Host: Kowloon, Hong Kong; Venue: Hong Kong Coliseum; Level: Super 500; Prize: $500,000; Format: 32MS/32WS/32MD/32WD/32XD | (Malaysia) Man Wei Chong (Malaysia) Tee Kai Wun | (Indonesia) Leo Rolly Carnando (Indonesia) Daniel Marthin |
| 16 November | Hong Kong Open (Draw): Dates: 17–22 November; Host: Kowloon, Hong Kong; Venue: Hong Kong Coliseum; Level: Super 500; Prize: $500,000; Format: 32MS/32WS/32MD/32WD/32XD | Score: 21–19, 21–18 | |
| 16 November | Hong Kong Open (Draw): Dates: 17–22 November; Host: Kowloon, Hong Kong; Venue: Hong Kong Coliseum; Level: Super 500; Prize: $500,000; Format: 32MS/32WS/32MD/32WD/32XD | (Malaysia) Pearly Tan (Malaysia) Thinaah Muralitharan | (Japan) Sumire Nakade (Japan) Miyu Takahashi |
| 16 November | Hong Kong Open (Draw): Dates: 17–22 November; Host: Kowloon, Hong Kong; Venue: Hong Kong Coliseum; Level: Super 500; Prize: $500,000; Format: 32MS/32WS/32MD/32WD/32XD | Score: 22–20, 21–16 | |
| 16 November | Hong Kong Open (Draw): Dates: 17–22 November; Host: Kowloon, Hong Kong; Venue: Hong Kong Coliseum; Level: Super 500; Prize: $500,000; Format: 32MS/32WS/32MD/32WD/32XD | (China) Feng Yanzhe (China) Huang Dongping | (China) Jiang Zhenbang (China) Wei Yaxin |
| 16 November | Hong Kong Open (Draw): Dates: 17–22 November; Host: Kowloon, Hong Kong; Venue: Hong Kong Coliseum; Level: Super 500; Prize: $500,000; Format: 32MS/32WS/32MD/32WD/32XD | Score: 17–21, 21–9, 21–15 | |
| 16 November | Indonesia International III: Dates: 17–22 November; Host: Yogyakarta, Indonesia; Venue: Among Rogo Sports Hall; Level: International Challenge; Prize: $20,000; Format: 128MS/64WS/64MD/32WD/64XD | (Indonesia) Muhammad Rizky Akbar | (Indonesia) Dendi Triansyah |
| 16 November | Indonesia International III: Dates: 17–22 November; Host: Yogyakarta, Indonesia; Venue: Among Rogo Sports Hall; Level: International Challenge; Prize: $20,000; Format: 128MS/64WS/64MD/32WD/64XD | Score: 6–21, 21–18, 21–17 | |
| 16 November | Indonesia International III: Dates: 17–22 November; Host: Yogyakarta, Indonesia; Venue: Among Rogo Sports Hall; Level: International Challenge; Prize: $20,000; Format: 128MS/64WS/64MD/32WD/64XD | (Malaysia) Oo Shan Zi | (Indonesia) Chiara Marvella Handoyo |
| 16 November | Indonesia International III: Dates: 17–22 November; Host: Yogyakarta, Indonesia; Venue: Among Rogo Sports Hall; Level: International Challenge; Prize: $20,000; Format: 128MS/64WS/64MD/32WD/64XD | Score: 21–12, 21–14 | |
| 16 November | Indonesia International III: Dates: 17–22 November; Host: Yogyakarta, Indonesia; Venue: Among Rogo Sports Hall; Level: International Challenge; Prize: $20,000; Format: 128MS/64WS/64MD/32WD/64XD | (Chinese Taipei) Chiu Shao-hua (Chinese Taipei) Lin Bing-wei | (Indonesia) Kenas Adi Haryanto (Indonesia) Gilang Krisandi Toyo Pramana |
| 16 November | Indonesia International III: Dates: 17–22 November; Host: Yogyakarta, Indonesia; Venue: Among Rogo Sports Hall; Level: International Challenge; Prize: $20,000; Format: 128MS/64WS/64MD/32WD/64XD | Score: 21–10, 21–9 | |
| 16 November | Indonesia International III: Dates: 17–22 November; Host: Yogyakarta, Indonesia; Venue: Among Rogo Sports Hall; Level: International Challenge; Prize: $20,000; Format: 128MS/64WS/64MD/32WD/64XD | (Indonesia) Lanny Tria Mayasari (Indonesia) Ester Nurumi Tri Wardoyo | (Malaysia) Cheng Su Hui (Malaysia) Chong Jie Yu |
| 16 November | Indonesia International III: Dates: 17–22 November; Host: Yogyakarta, Indonesia; Venue: Among Rogo Sports Hall; Level: International Challenge; Prize: $20,000; Format: 128MS/64WS/64MD/32WD/64XD | Score: 21–9, 22–20 | |
| 16 November | Indonesia International III: Dates: 17–22 November; Host: Yogyakarta, Indonesia; Venue: Among Rogo Sports Hall; Level: International Challenge; Prize: $20,000; Format: 128MS/64WS/64MD/32WD/64XD | (Indonesia) Muhammad Al Farizi (Indonesia) Jessica Maya Rismawardani | (Indonesia) Bimo Prasetyo (Indonesia) Thesya Munggaran |
| 16 November | Indonesia International III: Dates: 17–22 November; Host: Yogyakarta, Indonesia; Venue: Among Rogo Sports Hall; Level: International Challenge; Prize: $20,000; Format: 128MS/64WS/64MD/32WD/64XD | Score: 21–11, 21–13 | |
| 16 November | Guatemala International: Dates: 17–22 November; Host: Guatemala, Guatemala; Venue: Federación Nacional de Bádminton; Level: International Series; Prize: $10,000; Format: 32MS/16WS/16MD/4WD/8XD | (Guatemala) Kevin Cordón | (Canada) Shaurya Gullaiya |
| 16 November | Guatemala International: Dates: 17–22 November; Host: Guatemala, Guatemala; Venue: Federación Nacional de Bádminton; Level: International Series; Prize: $10,000; Format: 32MS/16WS/16MD/4WD/8XD | Score: 21–16, 22–20 | |
| 16 November | Guatemala International: Dates: 17–22 November; Host: Guatemala, Guatemala; Venue: Federación Nacional de Bádminton; Level: International Series; Prize: $10,000; Format: 32MS/16WS/16MD/4WD/8XD | (Greece) Grammatoula Sotiriou | (Colombia) Juliana Giraldo |
| 16 November | Guatemala International: Dates: 17–22 November; Host: Guatemala, Guatemala; Venue: Federación Nacional de Bádminton; Level: International Series; Prize: $10,000; Format: 32MS/16WS/16MD/4WD/8XD | Score: 21–15, 21–16 | |
| 16 November | Guatemala International: Dates: 17–22 November; Host: Guatemala, Guatemala; Venue: Federación Nacional de Bádminton; Level: International Series; Prize: $10,000; Format: 32MS/16WS/16MD/4WD/8XD | (United States) Srinivas Subash (United States) Joshua Yang | (Guatemala) Yeison del Cid (Guatemala) Christopher Martínez |
| 16 November | Guatemala International: Dates: 17–22 November; Host: Guatemala, Guatemala; Venue: Federación Nacional de Bádminton; Level: International Series; Prize: $10,000; Format: 32MS/16WS/16MD/4WD/8XD | Score: 23–21, 12–21, 21–13 | |
| 16 November | Guatemala International: Dates: 17–22 November; Host: Guatemala, Guatemala; Venue: Federación Nacional de Bádminton; Level: International Series; Prize: $10,000; Format: 32MS/16WS/16MD/4WD/8XD | (Guatemala) Diana Corleto (Guatemala) Nikté Sotomayor | (Argentina) Iona Gualdi (Argentina) Ailen Oliva |
| 16 November | Guatemala International: Dates: 17–22 November; Host: Guatemala, Guatemala; Venue: Federación Nacional de Bádminton; Level: International Series; Prize: $10,000; Format: 32MS/16WS/16MD/4WD/8XD | Score: 21–13, 21–11 | |
| 16 November | Guatemala International: Dates: 17–22 November; Host: Guatemala, Guatemala; Venue: Federación Nacional de Bádminton; Level: International Series; Prize: $10,000; Format: 32MS/16WS/16MD/4WD/8XD | (Guatemala) Christopher Martínez (Guatemala) Diana Corleto | (Argentina) Nicolas Oliva (Argentina) Ailen Oliva |
| 16 November | Guatemala International: Dates: 17–22 November; Host: Guatemala, Guatemala; Venue: Federación Nacional de Bádminton; Level: International Series; Prize: $10,000; Format: 32MS/16WS/16MD/4WD/8XD | Score: 21–9, 21–12 | |
| 16 November | Melbourne International: Dates: 18–22 November; Host: Albert Park, Victoria, Australia; Venue: Melbourne Sports & Aquatic Centre; Level: Future Series; Prize: $5,000; Format: 64MS/32WS/32MD/32WD/32XD | (South Korea) Kim Dong-hun | (South Korea) Lee Sun-jin |
| 16 November | Melbourne International: Dates: 18–22 November; Host: Albert Park, Victoria, Australia; Venue: Melbourne Sports & Aquatic Centre; Level: Future Series; Prize: $5,000; Format: 64MS/32WS/32MD/32WD/32XD | Score: 21–9, 11–21, 21–19 | |
| 16 November | Melbourne International: Dates: 18–22 November; Host: Albert Park, Victoria, Australia; Venue: Melbourne Sports & Aquatic Centre; Level: Future Series; Prize: $5,000; Format: 64MS/32WS/32MD/32WD/32XD | (South Korea) Boo Seo-yeon | (South Korea) Kim Do-yeon |
| 16 November | Melbourne International: Dates: 18–22 November; Host: Albert Park, Victoria, Australia; Venue: Melbourne Sports & Aquatic Centre; Level: Future Series; Prize: $5,000; Format: 64MS/32WS/32MD/32WD/32XD | Score: 21–19, 11–8 (retired) | |
| 16 November | Melbourne International: Dates: 18–22 November; Host: Albert Park, Victoria, Australia; Venue: Melbourne Sports & Aquatic Centre; Level: Future Series; Prize: $5,000; Format: 64MS/32WS/32MD/32WD/32XD | (South Korea) Cheon Ji-min (South Korea) Park Seung-min | (Indonesia) Alvi Wijaya Chairullah (Indonesia) Yohanes Saut Marcellyno |
| 16 November | Melbourne International: Dates: 18–22 November; Host: Albert Park, Victoria, Australia; Venue: Melbourne Sports & Aquatic Centre; Level: Future Series; Prize: $5,000; Format: 64MS/32WS/32MD/32WD/32XD | Score: 21–12, 21–15 | |
| 16 November | Melbourne International: Dates: 18–22 November; Host: Albert Park, Victoria, Australia; Venue: Melbourne Sports & Aquatic Centre; Level: Future Series; Prize: $5,000; Format: 64MS/32WS/32MD/32WD/32XD | (South Korea) Kim So-hee (South Korea) Yeon Seo-yeon | (South Korea) Gong Yeo-jin (South Korea) Hong Yoo-bin |
| 16 November | Melbourne International: Dates: 18–22 November; Host: Albert Park, Victoria, Australia; Venue: Melbourne Sports & Aquatic Centre; Level: Future Series; Prize: $5,000; Format: 64MS/32WS/32MD/32WD/32XD | Score: 21–3, 21–13 | |
| 16 November | Melbourne International: Dates: 18–22 November; Host: Albert Park, Victoria, Australia; Venue: Melbourne Sports & Aquatic Centre; Level: Future Series; Prize: $5,000; Format: 64MS/32WS/32MD/32WD/32XD | (South Korea) Park Seung-min (South Korea) Yeon Seo-yeon | (Australia) Rayne Wang (Canada) Josephine Wu |
| 16 November | Melbourne International: Dates: 18–22 November; Host: Albert Park, Victoria, Australia; Venue: Melbourne Sports & Aquatic Centre; Level: Future Series; Prize: $5,000; Format: 64MS/32WS/32MD/32WD/32XD | Score: 21–15, 21–6 | |
| 16 November | Türkiye International: Dates: 18–22 November; Host: Ankara, Türkiye; Venue: Türkiye Badminton Olympic Center Sports Hall; Level: Future Series; Format: 32MS/32WS/32MD/32WD/32XD | (Turkey) Mehmet Can Töremiş | (Turkey) Emre Lale |
| 16 November | Türkiye International: Dates: 18–22 November; Host: Ankara, Türkiye; Venue: Türkiye Badminton Olympic Center Sports Hall; Level: Future Series; Format: 32MS/32WS/32MD/32WD/32XD | Score: 19–21, 21–12, 21–17 | |
| 16 November | Türkiye International: Dates: 18–22 November; Host: Ankara, Türkiye; Venue: Türkiye Badminton Olympic Center Sports Hall; Level: Future Series; Format: 32MS/32WS/32MD/32WD/32XD | (Switzerland) Azkya Aliefa Ruhanda | (Turkey) Elifnur Demir |
| 16 November | Türkiye International: Dates: 18–22 November; Host: Ankara, Türkiye; Venue: Türkiye Badminton Olympic Center Sports Hall; Level: Future Series; Format: 32MS/32WS/32MD/32WD/32XD | Score: 14–21, 21–17, 21–19 | |
| 16 November | Türkiye International: Dates: 18–22 November; Host: Ankara, Türkiye; Venue: Türkiye Badminton Olympic Center Sports Hall; Level: Future Series; Format: 32MS/32WS/32MD/32WD/32XD | (Germany) Simon Schenk (Germany) Ole Schroth | (Bulgaria) Tsvetomir Stoyanov (Bulgaria) Yordan Yordanov |
| 16 November | Türkiye International: Dates: 18–22 November; Host: Ankara, Türkiye; Venue: Türkiye Badminton Olympic Center Sports Hall; Level: Future Series; Format: 32MS/32WS/32MD/32WD/32XD | Score: 21–15, 21–9 | |
| 16 November | Türkiye International: Dates: 18–22 November; Host: Ankara, Türkiye; Venue: Türkiye Badminton Olympic Center Sports Hall; Level: Future Series; Format: 32MS/32WS/32MD/32WD/32XD | (Individual Neutral Athletes) Maryna Yanbayeva (Individual Neutral Athletes) Sofiya Yanouskaya | (Germany) Shreya Hochscheid (Germany) Cara Siebrecht |
| 16 November | Türkiye International: Dates: 18–22 November; Host: Ankara, Türkiye; Venue: Türkiye Badminton Olympic Center Sports Hall; Level: Future Series; Format: 32MS/32WS/32MD/32WD/32XD | Score: 21–8, 14–21, 24–22 | |
| 16 November | Türkiye International: Dates: 18–22 November; Host: Ankara, Türkiye; Venue: Türkiye Badminton Olympic Center Sports Hall; Level: Future Series; Format: 32MS/32WS/32MD/32WD/32XD | (Turkey) Buğra Aktaş (Turkey) Sinem Yıldız | (Turkey) Gökay Göl (Turkey) Nisa Nur Çimen |
| 16 November | Türkiye International: Dates: 18–22 November; Host: Ankara, Türkiye; Venue: Türkiye Badminton Olympic Center Sports Hall; Level: Future Series; Format: 32MS/32WS/32MD/32WD/32XD | Score: 21–18, 22–20 | |
| 16 November | Scottish Open: Dates: 19–22 November; Host: Glasgow, Scotland; Venue: Emirates Arena; Level: International Challenge; Prize: $20,000; Format: 32MS/32WS/32MD/32WD/32XD | (Chinese Taipei) Ting Yen-chen | (Croatia) Aria Dinata |
| 16 November | Scottish Open: Dates: 19–22 November; Host: Glasgow, Scotland; Venue: Emirates Arena; Level: International Challenge; Prize: $20,000; Format: 32MS/32WS/32MD/32WD/32XD | Score: 21–9, 21–14 | |
| 16 November | Scottish Open: Dates: 19–22 November; Host: Glasgow, Scotland; Venue: Emirates Arena; Level: International Challenge; Prize: $20,000; Format: 32MS/32WS/32MD/32WD/32XD | (South Korea) Kim Min-ji | (South Korea) Park Ga-eun |
| 16 November | Scottish Open: Dates: 19–22 November; Host: Glasgow, Scotland; Venue: Emirates Arena; Level: International Challenge; Prize: $20,000; Format: 32MS/32WS/32MD/32WD/32XD | Score: 22–20, 20–22, 21–19 | |
| 16 November | Scottish Open: Dates: 19–22 November; Host: Glasgow, Scotland; Venue: Emirates Arena; Level: International Challenge; Prize: $20,000; Format: 32MS/32WS/32MD/32WD/32XD | (South Korea) Jin Sung-ik (South Korea) Lee Hyeong-woo | (Germany) Daniel Hess (Germany) Simon Krax |
| 16 November | Scottish Open: Dates: 19–22 November; Host: Glasgow, Scotland; Venue: Emirates Arena; Level: International Challenge; Prize: $20,000; Format: 32MS/32WS/32MD/32WD/32XD | Score: 14–21, 22–20, 21–7 | |
| 16 November | Scottish Open: Dates: 19–22 November; Host: Glasgow, Scotland; Venue: Emirates Arena; Level: International Challenge; Prize: $20,000; Format: 32MS/32WS/32MD/32WD/32XD | (South Korea) Lee Seung-hee (South Korea) Park Min-ji | (Germany) Stine Küspert (Germany) Isabel Lohau |
| 16 November | Scottish Open: Dates: 19–22 November; Host: Glasgow, Scotland; Venue: Emirates Arena; Level: International Challenge; Prize: $20,000; Format: 32MS/32WS/32MD/32WD/32XD | Score: 21–17, 21–16 | |
| 16 November | Scottish Open: Dates: 19–22 November; Host: Glasgow, Scotland; Venue: Emirates Arena; Level: International Challenge; Prize: $20,000; Format: 32MS/32WS/32MD/32WD/32XD | (Denmark) Kristoffer Kolding (Denmark) Mette Werge | (Denmark) Jesper Toft (Denmark) Amalie Cecilie Kudsk |
| 16 November | Scottish Open: Dates: 19–22 November; Host: Glasgow, Scotland; Venue: Emirates Arena; Level: International Challenge; Prize: $20,000; Format: 32MS/32WS/32MD/32WD/32XD | Score: 21–19, 13–21, 25–23 | |
| 16 November | Botswana International (cancelled): Dates: 19–22 November; Host: Otse, Botswana; Venue: Otse Police College Indoor Gymnasium; Level: Future Series; Format: 32MS/16WS/32MD/8WD/16XD | | |
| 16 November | Botswana International (cancelled): Dates: 19–22 November; Host: Otse, Botswana; Venue: Otse Police College Indoor Gymnasium; Level: Future Series; Format: 32MS/16WS/32MD/8WD/16XD | Score: | |
| 16 November | Botswana International (cancelled): Dates: 19–22 November; Host: Otse, Botswana; Venue: Otse Police College Indoor Gymnasium; Level: Future Series; Format: 32MS/16WS/32MD/8WD/16XD | Score: | |
| 16 November | Botswana International (cancelled): Dates: 19–22 November; Host: Otse, Botswana; Venue: Otse Police College Indoor Gymnasium; Level: Future Series; Format: 32MS/16WS/32MD/8WD/16XD | Score: | |
| 16 November | Botswana International (cancelled): Dates: 19–22 November; Host: Otse, Botswana; Venue: Otse Police College Indoor Gymnasium; Level: Future Series; Format: 32MS/16WS/32MD/8WD/16XD | Score: | |
| 16 November | Botswana International (cancelled): Dates: 19–22 November; Host: Otse, Botswana; Venue: Otse Police College Indoor Gymnasium; Level: Future Series; Format: 32MS/16WS/32MD/8WD/16XD | Score: | |
| 23 November | Syed Modi International (Draw): Dates: 24–29 November; Host: Lucknow, India; Venue: Babu Banarasi Das Indoor Stadium; Level: Super 300; Prize: $250,000; Format: 32MS/32WS/32MD/32WD/32XD | | |
| 23 November | Syed Modi International (Draw): Dates: 24–29 November; Host: Lucknow, India; Venue: Babu Banarasi Das Indoor Stadium; Level: Super 300; Prize: $250,000; Format: 32MS/32WS/32MD/32WD/32XD | Score: | |
| 23 November | Syed Modi International (Draw): Dates: 24–29 November; Host: Lucknow, India; Venue: Babu Banarasi Das Indoor Stadium; Level: Super 300; Prize: $250,000; Format: 32MS/32WS/32MD/32WD/32XD | Score: | |
| 23 November | Syed Modi International (Draw): Dates: 24–29 November; Host: Lucknow, India; Venue: Babu Banarasi Das Indoor Stadium; Level: Super 300; Prize: $250,000; Format: 32MS/32WS/32MD/32WD/32XD | Score: | |
| 23 November | Syed Modi International (Draw): Dates: 24–29 November; Host: Lucknow, India; Venue: Babu Banarasi Das Indoor Stadium; Level: Super 300; Prize: $250,000; Format: 32MS/32WS/32MD/32WD/32XD | Score: | |
| 23 November | Syed Modi International (Draw): Dates: 24–29 November; Host: Lucknow, India; Venue: Babu Banarasi Das Indoor Stadium; Level: Super 300; Prize: $250,000; Format: 32MS/32WS/32MD/32WD/32XD | Score: | |
| 23 November | Toyota International: Dates: 24–29 November; Host: Bangkok, Thailand; Venue: PAT Arena BKK; Level: International Challenge; Prize: $20,000; Format: 256MS/128WS/64MD/64WD/64XD | | |
| 23 November | Toyota International: Dates: 24–29 November; Host: Bangkok, Thailand; Venue: PAT Arena BKK; Level: International Challenge; Prize: $20,000; Format: 256MS/128WS/64MD/64WD/64XD | Score: | |
| 23 November | Toyota International: Dates: 24–29 November; Host: Bangkok, Thailand; Venue: PAT Arena BKK; Level: International Challenge; Prize: $20,000; Format: 256MS/128WS/64MD/64WD/64XD | Score: | |
| 23 November | Toyota International: Dates: 24–29 November; Host: Bangkok, Thailand; Venue: PAT Arena BKK; Level: International Challenge; Prize: $20,000; Format: 256MS/128WS/64MD/64WD/64XD | Score: | |
| 23 November | Toyota International: Dates: 24–29 November; Host: Bangkok, Thailand; Venue: PAT Arena BKK; Level: International Challenge; Prize: $20,000; Format: 256MS/128WS/64MD/64WD/64XD | Score: | |
| 23 November | Toyota International: Dates: 24–29 November; Host: Bangkok, Thailand; Venue: PAT Arena BKK; Level: International Challenge; Prize: $20,000; Format: 256MS/128WS/64MD/64WD/64XD | Score: | |
| 23 November | El Salvador International: Dates: 25–29 November; Host: San Salvador, El Salvador; Venue: Coliseo de Bádminton “El Polvorín”; Level: Future Series; Format: 32MS/32WS/16MD/16WD/32XD | | |
| 23 November | El Salvador International: Dates: 25–29 November; Host: San Salvador, El Salvador; Venue: Coliseo de Bádminton “El Polvorín”; Level: Future Series; Format: 32MS/32WS/16MD/16WD/32XD | Score: | |
| 23 November | El Salvador International: Dates: 25–29 November; Host: San Salvador, El Salvador; Venue: Coliseo de Bádminton “El Polvorín”; Level: Future Series; Format: 32MS/32WS/16MD/16WD/32XD | Score: | |
| 23 November | El Salvador International: Dates: 25–29 November; Host: San Salvador, El Salvador; Venue: Coliseo de Bádminton “El Polvorín”; Level: Future Series; Format: 32MS/32WS/16MD/16WD/32XD | Score: | |
| 23 November | El Salvador International: Dates: 25–29 November; Host: San Salvador, El Salvador; Venue: Coliseo de Bádminton “El Polvorín”; Level: Future Series; Format: 32MS/32WS/16MD/16WD/32XD | Score: | |
| 23 November | El Salvador International: Dates: 25–29 November; Host: San Salvador, El Salvador; Venue: Coliseo de Bádminton “El Polvorín”; Level: Future Series; Format: 32MS/32WS/16MD/16WD/32XD | Score: | |
| 23 November | Welsh International: Dates: 26–29 November; Host: Cardiff, Wales; Venue: Sport Wales National Centre; Level: International Series; Prize: $10,000; Format: 32MS/32WS/32MD/32WD/32XD | | |
| 23 November | Welsh International: Dates: 26–29 November; Host: Cardiff, Wales; Venue: Sport Wales National Centre; Level: International Series; Prize: $10,000; Format: 32MS/32WS/32MD/32WD/32XD | Score: | |
| 23 November | Welsh International: Dates: 26–29 November; Host: Cardiff, Wales; Venue: Sport Wales National Centre; Level: International Series; Prize: $10,000; Format: 32MS/32WS/32MD/32WD/32XD | Score: | |
| 23 November | Welsh International: Dates: 26–29 November; Host: Cardiff, Wales; Venue: Sport Wales National Centre; Level: International Series; Prize: $10,000; Format: 32MS/32WS/32MD/32WD/32XD | Score: | |
| 23 November | Welsh International: Dates: 26–29 November; Host: Cardiff, Wales; Venue: Sport Wales National Centre; Level: International Series; Prize: $10,000; Format: 32MS/32WS/32MD/32WD/32XD | Score: | |
| 23 November | Welsh International: Dates: 26–29 November; Host: Cardiff, Wales; Venue: Sport Wales National Centre; Level: International Series; Prize: $10,000; Format: 32MS/32WS/32MD/32WD/32XD | Score: | |
| 23 November | South Africa International: Dates: 26–29 November; Host: Cape Town, South Africa; Venue: John Tyers Hall; Level: Future Series; Format: 32MS/32WS/16MD/16WD/16XD | | |
| 23 November | South Africa International: Dates: 26–29 November; Host: Cape Town, South Africa; Venue: John Tyers Hall; Level: Future Series; Format: 32MS/32WS/16MD/16WD/16XD | Score: | |
| 23 November | South Africa International: Dates: 26–29 November; Host: Cape Town, South Africa; Venue: John Tyers Hall; Level: Future Series; Format: 32MS/32WS/16MD/16WD/16XD | Score: | |
| 23 November | South Africa International: Dates: 26–29 November; Host: Cape Town, South Africa; Venue: John Tyers Hall; Level: Future Series; Format: 32MS/32WS/16MD/16WD/16XD | Score: | |
| 23 November | South Africa International: Dates: 26–29 November; Host: Cape Town, South Africa; Venue: John Tyers Hall; Level: Future Series; Format: 32MS/32WS/16MD/16WD/16XD | Score: | |
| 23 November | South Africa International: Dates: 26–29 November; Host: Cape Town, South Africa; Venue: John Tyers Hall; Level: Future Series; Format: 32MS/32WS/16MD/16WD/16XD | Score: | |
| 30 November | Guwahati Masters (Draw): Dates: 1–6 December; Host: Guwahati, India; Venue: TBC; Level: Super 100; Prize: $120,000; Format: 48MS/32WS/32MD/32WD/32XD | | |
| 30 November | Guwahati Masters (Draw): Dates: 1–6 December; Host: Guwahati, India; Venue: TBC; Level: Super 100; Prize: $120,000; Format: 48MS/32WS/32MD/32WD/32XD | Score: | |
| 30 November | Guwahati Masters (Draw): Dates: 1–6 December; Host: Guwahati, India; Venue: TBC; Level: Super 100; Prize: $120,000; Format: 48MS/32WS/32MD/32WD/32XD | Score: | |
| 30 November | Guwahati Masters (Draw): Dates: 1–6 December; Host: Guwahati, India; Venue: TBC; Level: Super 100; Prize: $120,000; Format: 48MS/32WS/32MD/32WD/32XD | Score: | |
| 30 November | Guwahati Masters (Draw): Dates: 1–6 December; Host: Guwahati, India; Venue: TBC; Level: Super 100; Prize: $120,000; Format: 48MS/32WS/32MD/32WD/32XD | Score: | |
| 30 November | Guwahati Masters (Draw): Dates: 1–6 December; Host: Guwahati, India; Venue: TBC; Level: Super 100; Prize: $120,000; Format: 48MS/32WS/32MD/32WD/32XD | Score: | |
| 30 November | Canadian International: Dates: 1–6 November; Host: Markham, Ontario, Canada; Venue: Markham Pan Am Centre; Level: International Challenge; Prize: $15,000; Format: 32MS/32WS/32MD/16WD/32XD | | |
| 30 November | Canadian International: Dates: 1–6 November; Host: Markham, Ontario, Canada; Venue: Markham Pan Am Centre; Level: International Challenge; Prize: $15,000; Format: 32MS/32WS/32MD/16WD/32XD | Score: | |
| 30 November | Canadian International: Dates: 1–6 November; Host: Markham, Ontario, Canada; Venue: Markham Pan Am Centre; Level: International Challenge; Prize: $15,000; Format: 32MS/32WS/32MD/16WD/32XD | Score: | |
| 30 November | Canadian International: Dates: 1–6 November; Host: Markham, Ontario, Canada; Venue: Markham Pan Am Centre; Level: International Challenge; Prize: $15,000; Format: 32MS/32WS/32MD/16WD/32XD | Score: | |
| 30 November | Canadian International: Dates: 1–6 November; Host: Markham, Ontario, Canada; Venue: Markham Pan Am Centre; Level: International Challenge; Prize: $15,000; Format: 32MS/32WS/32MD/16WD/32XD | Score: | |
| 30 November | Canadian International: Dates: 1–6 November; Host: Markham, Ontario, Canada; Venue: Markham Pan Am Centre; Level: International Challenge; Prize: $15,000; Format: 32MS/32WS/32MD/16WD/32XD | Score: | |
| 30 November | Vietnam International (Huế): Dates: 1–6 December; Host: Huế, Vietnam; Venue: Huế City Sports Center Arena; Level: International Series; Prize: $5,000; Format: 64MS/32WS/32MD/32WD/32XD | | |
| 30 November | Vietnam International (Huế): Dates: 1–6 December; Host: Huế, Vietnam; Venue: Huế City Sports Center Arena; Level: International Series; Prize: $5,000; Format: 64MS/32WS/32MD/32WD/32XD | Score: | |
| 30 November | Vietnam International (Huế): Dates: 1–6 December; Host: Huế, Vietnam; Venue: Huế City Sports Center Arena; Level: International Series; Prize: $5,000; Format: 64MS/32WS/32MD/32WD/32XD | Score: | |
| 30 November | Vietnam International (Huế): Dates: 1–6 December; Host: Huế, Vietnam; Venue: Huế City Sports Center Arena; Level: International Series; Prize: $5,000; Format: 64MS/32WS/32MD/32WD/32XD | Score: | |
| 30 November | Vietnam International (Huế): Dates: 1–6 December; Host: Huế, Vietnam; Venue: Huế City Sports Center Arena; Level: International Series; Prize: $5,000; Format: 64MS/32WS/32MD/32WD/32XD | Score: | |
| 30 November | Vietnam International (Huế): Dates: 1–6 December; Host: Huế, Vietnam; Venue: Huế City Sports Center Arena; Level: International Series; Prize: $5,000; Format: 64MS/32WS/32MD/32WD/32XD | Score: | |
| 30 November | Algeria International: Dates: 2–5 December; Host: Algiers, Algeria; Venue: Eshra; Level: International Series; Prize: $5,000; Format: 32MS/32WS/32MD/32WD/32XD | | |
| 30 November | Algeria International: Dates: 2–5 December; Host: Algiers, Algeria; Venue: Eshra; Level: International Series; Prize: $5,000; Format: 32MS/32WS/32MD/32WD/32XD | Score: | |
| 30 November | Algeria International: Dates: 2–5 December; Host: Algiers, Algeria; Venue: Eshra; Level: International Series; Prize: $5,000; Format: 32MS/32WS/32MD/32WD/32XD | Score: | |
| 30 November | Algeria International: Dates: 2–5 December; Host: Algiers, Algeria; Venue: Eshra; Level: International Series; Prize: $5,000; Format: 32MS/32WS/32MD/32WD/32XD | Score: | |
| 30 November | Algeria International: Dates: 2–5 December; Host: Algiers, Algeria; Venue: Eshra; Level: International Series; Prize: $5,000; Format: 32MS/32WS/32MD/32WD/32XD | Score: | |
| 30 November | Algeria International: Dates: 2–5 December; Host: Algiers, Algeria; Venue: Eshra; Level: International Series; Prize: $5,000; Format: 32MS/32WS/32MD/32WD/32XD | Score: | |

=== December ===
| Week commencing | Tournament | Champions | Runners-up |
|---|---|---|---|
| 7 December | Odisha Masters (Draw): Dates: 8–13 December; Host: Cuttack, India; Venue: TBC; Level: Super 100; Prize: $120,000; Format: 48MS/32WS/32MD/32WD/32XD | | |
| 7 December | Odisha Masters (Draw): Dates: 8–13 December; Host: Cuttack, India; Venue: TBC; Level: Super 100; Prize: $120,000; Format: 48MS/32WS/32MD/32WD/32XD | Score: | |
| 7 December | Odisha Masters (Draw): Dates: 8–13 December; Host: Cuttack, India; Venue: TBC; Level: Super 100; Prize: $120,000; Format: 48MS/32WS/32MD/32WD/32XD | Score: | |
| 7 December | Odisha Masters (Draw): Dates: 8–13 December; Host: Cuttack, India; Venue: TBC; Level: Super 100; Prize: $120,000; Format: 48MS/32WS/32MD/32WD/32XD | Score: | |
| 7 December | Odisha Masters (Draw): Dates: 8–13 December; Host: Cuttack, India; Venue: TBC; Level: Super 100; Prize: $120,000; Format: 48MS/32WS/32MD/32WD/32XD | Score: | |
| 7 December | Odisha Masters (Draw): Dates: 8–13 December; Host: Cuttack, India; Venue: TBC; Level: Super 100; Prize: $120,000; Format: 48MS/32WS/32MD/32WD/32XD | Score: | |
| 7 December | Egypt International: Dates: 8–12 December; Host: Cairo, Egypt; Venue: Police Sports Federation; Level: International Series; Prize: $10,000; Format: 32MS/32WS/32MD/32WD/32XD | | |
| 7 December | Egypt International: Dates: 8–12 December; Host: Cairo, Egypt; Venue: Police Sports Federation; Level: International Series; Prize: $10,000; Format: 32MS/32WS/32MD/32WD/32XD | Score: | |
| 7 December | Egypt International: Dates: 8–12 December; Host: Cairo, Egypt; Venue: Police Sports Federation; Level: International Series; Prize: $10,000; Format: 32MS/32WS/32MD/32WD/32XD | Score: | |
| 7 December | Egypt International: Dates: 8–12 December; Host: Cairo, Egypt; Venue: Police Sports Federation; Level: International Series; Prize: $10,000; Format: 32MS/32WS/32MD/32WD/32XD | Score: | |
| 7 December | Egypt International: Dates: 8–12 December; Host: Cairo, Egypt; Venue: Police Sports Federation; Level: International Series; Prize: $10,000; Format: 32MS/32WS/32MD/32WD/32XD | Score: | |
| 7 December | Egypt International: Dates: 8–12 December; Host: Cairo, Egypt; Venue: Police Sports Federation; Level: International Series; Prize: $10,000; Format: 32MS/32WS/32MD/32WD/32XD | Score: | |
| 7 December | LA International: Dates: 8–13 December; Host: Los Angeles, California, USA; Venue: San Gabriel Valley Badminton Club; Level: International Series; Prize: $20,000; Format: 32MS/32WS/32MD/16WD/32XD | | |
| 7 December | LA International: Dates: 8–13 December; Host: Los Angeles, California, USA; Venue: San Gabriel Valley Badminton Club; Level: International Series; Prize: $20,000; Format: 32MS/32WS/32MD/16WD/32XD | Score: | |
| 7 December | LA International: Dates: 8–13 December; Host: Los Angeles, California, USA; Venue: San Gabriel Valley Badminton Club; Level: International Series; Prize: $20,000; Format: 32MS/32WS/32MD/16WD/32XD | Score: | |
| 7 December | LA International: Dates: 8–13 December; Host: Los Angeles, California, USA; Venue: San Gabriel Valley Badminton Club; Level: International Series; Prize: $20,000; Format: 32MS/32WS/32MD/16WD/32XD | Score: | |
| 7 December | LA International: Dates: 8–13 December; Host: Los Angeles, California, USA; Venue: San Gabriel Valley Badminton Club; Level: International Series; Prize: $20,000; Format: 32MS/32WS/32MD/16WD/32XD | Score: | |
| 7 December | LA International: Dates: 8–13 December; Host: Los Angeles, California, USA; Venue: San Gabriel Valley Badminton Club; Level: International Series; Prize: $20,000; Format: 32MS/32WS/32MD/16WD/32XD | Score: | |
| 7 December | BWF World Tour Finals (Draw): Dates: 9–13 December; Host: Hangzhou, China; Venue: Hangzhou Olympic Sports Center; Level: World Tour Finals; Prize: $3,500,000; Format: 8MS/8WS/8MD/8WD/8XD | | |
| 7 December | BWF World Tour Finals (Draw): Dates: 9–13 December; Host: Hangzhou, China; Venue: Hangzhou Olympic Sports Center; Level: World Tour Finals; Prize: $3,500,000; Format: 8MS/8WS/8MD/8WD/8XD | Score: | |
| 7 December | BWF World Tour Finals (Draw): Dates: 9–13 December; Host: Hangzhou, China; Venue: Hangzhou Olympic Sports Center; Level: World Tour Finals; Prize: $3,500,000; Format: 8MS/8WS/8MD/8WD/8XD | Score: | |
| 7 December | BWF World Tour Finals (Draw): Dates: 9–13 December; Host: Hangzhou, China; Venue: Hangzhou Olympic Sports Center; Level: World Tour Finals; Prize: $3,500,000; Format: 8MS/8WS/8MD/8WD/8XD | Score: | |
| 7 December | BWF World Tour Finals (Draw): Dates: 9–13 December; Host: Hangzhou, China; Venue: Hangzhou Olympic Sports Center; Level: World Tour Finals; Prize: $3,500,000; Format: 8MS/8WS/8MD/8WD/8XD | Score: | |
| 7 December | BWF World Tour Finals (Draw): Dates: 9–13 December; Host: Hangzhou, China; Venue: Hangzhou Olympic Sports Center; Level: World Tour Finals; Prize: $3,500,000; Format: 8MS/8WS/8MD/8WD/8XD | Score: | |
| 7 December | Slovenia Future Series: Dates: 10–13 December; Host: Laško, Slovenia; Venue: Sport hall Tri Lilije; Level: Future Series; Format: 48MS/48WS/24MD/24WD/32XD | | |
| 7 December | Slovenia Future Series: Dates: 10–13 December; Host: Laško, Slovenia; Venue: Sport hall Tri Lilije; Level: Future Series; Format: 48MS/48WS/24MD/24WD/32XD | Score: | |
| 7 December | Slovenia Future Series: Dates: 10–13 December; Host: Laško, Slovenia; Venue: Sport hall Tri Lilije; Level: Future Series; Format: 48MS/48WS/24MD/24WD/32XD | Score: | |
| 7 December | Slovenia Future Series: Dates: 10–13 December; Host: Laško, Slovenia; Venue: Sport hall Tri Lilije; Level: Future Series; Format: 48MS/48WS/24MD/24WD/32XD | Score: | |
| 7 December | Slovenia Future Series: Dates: 10–13 December; Host: Laško, Slovenia; Venue: Sport hall Tri Lilije; Level: Future Series; Format: 48MS/48WS/24MD/24WD/32XD | Score: | |
| 7 December | Slovenia Future Series: Dates: 10–13 December; Host: Laško, Slovenia; Venue: Sport hall Tri Lilije; Level: Future Series; Format: 48MS/48WS/24MD/24WD/32XD | Score: | |
| 14 December | Bangladesh International: Dates: 16–20 December; Host: Dhaka, Bangladesh; Venue: Shaheed Tajuddin Ahmed Indoor Stadium; Level: International Challenge; Prize: $17,500; Format: 64MS/32WS/32MD/16WD/16XD | | |
| 14 December | Bangladesh International: Dates: 16–20 December; Host: Dhaka, Bangladesh; Venue: Shaheed Tajuddin Ahmed Indoor Stadium; Level: International Challenge; Prize: $17,500; Format: 64MS/32WS/32MD/16WD/16XD | Score: | |
| 14 December | Bangladesh International: Dates: 16–20 December; Host: Dhaka, Bangladesh; Venue: Shaheed Tajuddin Ahmed Indoor Stadium; Level: International Challenge; Prize: $17,500; Format: 64MS/32WS/32MD/16WD/16XD | Score: | |
| 14 December | Bangladesh International: Dates: 16–20 December; Host: Dhaka, Bangladesh; Venue: Shaheed Tajuddin Ahmed Indoor Stadium; Level: International Challenge; Prize: $17,500; Format: 64MS/32WS/32MD/16WD/16XD | Score: | |
| 14 December | Bangladesh International: Dates: 16–20 December; Host: Dhaka, Bangladesh; Venue: Shaheed Tajuddin Ahmed Indoor Stadium; Level: International Challenge; Prize: $17,500; Format: 64MS/32WS/32MD/16WD/16XD | Score: | |
| 14 December | Bangladesh International: Dates: 16–20 December; Host: Dhaka, Bangladesh; Venue: Shaheed Tajuddin Ahmed Indoor Stadium; Level: International Challenge; Prize: $17,500; Format: 64MS/32WS/32MD/16WD/16XD | Score: | |
| 14 December | Azerbaijan Caspian Cup (cancelled): Dates: 17–20 December; Host: Baku, Azerbaijan; Venue: Baku Sports Palace; Level: International Series; Prize: $10,000; Format: | | |
| 14 December | Azerbaijan Caspian Cup (cancelled): Dates: 17–20 December; Host: Baku, Azerbaijan; Venue: Baku Sports Palace; Level: International Series; Prize: $10,000; Format: | Score: | |
| 14 December | Azerbaijan Caspian Cup (cancelled): Dates: 17–20 December; Host: Baku, Azerbaijan; Venue: Baku Sports Palace; Level: International Series; Prize: $10,000; Format: | Score: | |
| 14 December | Azerbaijan Caspian Cup (cancelled): Dates: 17–20 December; Host: Baku, Azerbaijan; Venue: Baku Sports Palace; Level: International Series; Prize: $10,000; Format: | Score: | |
| 14 December | Azerbaijan Caspian Cup (cancelled): Dates: 17–20 December; Host: Baku, Azerbaijan; Venue: Baku Sports Palace; Level: International Series; Prize: $10,000; Format: | Score: | |
| 14 December | Azerbaijan Caspian Cup (cancelled): Dates: 17–20 December; Host: Baku, Azerbaijan; Venue: Baku Sports Palace; Level: International Series; Prize: $10,000; Format: | Score: | |
| 21 December | Bangladesh International: Dates: 22–26 December; Host: Dhaka, Bangladesh; Venue: Shaheed Tajuddin Ahmed Indoor Stadium; Level: International Series; Prize: $5,000; Format: 64MS/32WS/32MD/16WD/16XD | | |
| 21 December | Bangladesh International: Dates: 22–26 December; Host: Dhaka, Bangladesh; Venue: Shaheed Tajuddin Ahmed Indoor Stadium; Level: International Series; Prize: $5,000; Format: 64MS/32WS/32MD/16WD/16XD | Score: | |
| 21 December | Bangladesh International: Dates: 22–26 December; Host: Dhaka, Bangladesh; Venue: Shaheed Tajuddin Ahmed Indoor Stadium; Level: International Series; Prize: $5,000; Format: 64MS/32WS/32MD/16WD/16XD | Score: | |
| 21 December | Bangladesh International: Dates: 22–26 December; Host: Dhaka, Bangladesh; Venue: Shaheed Tajuddin Ahmed Indoor Stadium; Level: International Series; Prize: $5,000; Format: 64MS/32WS/32MD/16WD/16XD | Score: | |
| 21 December | Bangladesh International: Dates: 22–26 December; Host: Dhaka, Bangladesh; Venue: Shaheed Tajuddin Ahmed Indoor Stadium; Level: International Series; Prize: $5,000; Format: 64MS/32WS/32MD/16WD/16XD | Score: | |
| 21 December | Bangladesh International: Dates: 22–26 December; Host: Dhaka, Bangladesh; Venue: Shaheed Tajuddin Ahmed Indoor Stadium; Level: International Series; Prize: $5,000; Format: 64MS/32WS/32MD/16WD/16XD | Score: | |

== Retirements ==
Following is a list of notable players (winners of the main tour title, and/or part of the BWF Rankings top 100 for at least one week) who announced their retirement from professional badminton, during the 2026 season:

- Saina Nehwal (born 17 March 1990 in Hisar, India) reached a career high of no. 1 in Women's singles on 2 April 2015. Won the Commonwealth Games for two times in 2010 and 2018. She announced her retirement on 19 January 2026. The 2023 Singapore Open was her last tournament.
- Carolina Marín (born 15 June 1993 in Huelva, Spain) reached a career high of no. 1 in Women's singles on 11 June 2015. Won the Olympic Games in 2016 and is also a three-time world champion. She announced her retirement on 26 March 2026. The 2024 Olympics was her last tournament.
- Gao Fangjie (born 29 September 1998 in Nanjing, China) reached a career high of no. 10 in Women's singles on 27 January 2026. She announced her retirement on 10 April 2026. The 2026 Badminton Asia Championships was her last tournament.
- Viktor Axelsen (born 4 January 1994 in Odense, Denmark) reached a career high of no. 1 in Men's singles on 28 September 2017. Won the Olympic Games twice in 2021 & 2024 and is also a two-time world champion. He announced his retirement on 15 April 2026. The 2025 French Open was his last tournament.
- Zhang Shuxian (born 2 January 2000 in Luzhou, Sichuan China) reached a carrer high of no. 2 in Women's doubles on 23 May 2023. She announced her retirement on 8 October 2026. The 2026 Asian Games was her last tournament.
